= 2019–20 BC Žalgiris season =

Žalgiris Kaunas
2019–20 season
- Director: (Lithuania) Paulius Motiejūnas
- Sports director: (Lithuania) Robertas Javtokas
- Head coach: (Lithuania) Šarūnas Jasikevičius
- Arena: Žalgiris Arena
- LKL: Champions
- EuroLeague: Suspended
- Lithuanian Cup: Champions
- Highest home attendance: 15,342; 86–93 (Spain) FC Barcelona (8 November 2019)
- Lowest home attendance: 2,591; 86–80 (Lithuania) BC Šiauliai (15 December 2019)
- Average home attendance: 14292 (Euroleague); 4619 (Betsafe-LKL)
- Biggest win: +52; 102–52 (Lithuania) Sintek-Dzūkija (24 November 2019)
- Biggest defeat: –12; 58–70 (Spain) Kirolbet Baskonia (4 October 2019); 70–82 (Russia) Zenit (30 October 2019)
Home	Away
- All statistics correct as of May 8, 2020.

The 2019–20 BC Žalgiris season is the 76th season in the existence of the club. The club has been playing in the Betsafe-LKL, King Mindaugas Cup and the EuroLeague.

== Overview ==
During the off-season, Aaron White, Brandon Davies, Nate Wolters, Léo Westermann and Deon Thompson left, while Antanas Kavaliauskas announced retirement. Little used guard Donatas Sabeckis was also not re-signed. Lukas Lekavičius returned to the team after two seasons in Greece, and Alex Pérez was signed to replace Westermann. Jock Landale was signed to replace Davies, while Nigel Hayes was signed to replace White. Zach LeDay of Olympiacos was signed to complete the front court. Martinas Geben, signed to a long-term deal the previous summer, earned a spot on the roster after a successful season in Juventus Utena in the LKL, where he was named Season MVP. Marius Grigonis, who had a great season, was resigned to new contract. Coach Šarūnas Jasikevičius remained with the team for one more season.

Žalgiris won the King Mindaugas Cup, getting revenge and beating BC Rytas 80–60 in the finals. Edgaras Ulanovas was named the MVP of the tournament, his fourth such award in Lithuanian Cup competitions.

=== Season suspension ===
Due to the COVID-19 pandemic, the 2019-20 LKL season was ended prematurely, and with Žalgiris firmly leading the standings, Žalgiris was announced as the champion of the LKL, winning their 10th consecutive LKL championship. On 12 March 2020, Euroleague announced it was suspending its competitions due to the same reason.

== Players ==
=== Squad information ===
Note: Flags indicate national team eligibility at FIBA-sanctioned events. Players may hold other non-FIBA nationalities not displayed.

Žalgiris roster
Players
Coaches

Pos.	No.	Nat.	Name	Ht.	Wt.	Age
G	0	(United States)	Walkup, Thomas	1.93 m (6 ft 4 in)	92 kg (203 lb)	33 – 30 December 1992
G/F	1	(United States)	Rivers, K.C.	1.96 m (6 ft 5 in)	96 kg (212 lb)	39 – 1 March 1987
PG	4	(Lithuania)	Lekavičius, Lukas	1.81 m (5 ft 11 in)	76 kg (168 lb)	32 – 30 March 1994
PF	10	(United States)	Hayes, Nigel	2.03 m (6 ft 8 in)	103 kg (227 lb)	31 – 16 December 1994
F	12	(Lithuania)	Venskus, Erikas	2.05 m (6 ft 9 in)	100 kg (220 lb)	26 – 28 May 2000
PF	13	(Lithuania)	Jankūnas, Paulius (C)	2.05 m (6 ft 9 in)	113 kg (249 lb)	42 – 29 April 1984
SG	16	(Lithuania)	Lukošiūnas, Karolis	1.95 m (6 ft 5 in)	92 kg (203 lb)	29 – 4 August 1997
SG	21	(Lithuania)	Milaknis, Artūras	1.95 m (6 ft 5 in)	90 kg (198 lb)	40 – 16 June 1986
C	23	(Lithuania)	Geben, Martinas	2.08 m (6 ft 10 in)	114 kg (251 lb)	31 – 20 October 1994
PG	31	(Lithuania)	Jokubaitis, Rokas	1.93 m (6 ft 4 in)	88 kg (194 lb)	25 – 19 November 2000
F/C	32	(United States)	LeDay, Zach	2.02 m (6 ft 8 in)	108 kg (238 lb)	32 – 30 May 1994
C	34	(Australia)	Landale, Jock	2.11 m (6 ft 11 in)	116 kg (256 lb)	30 – 25 October 1995
G/F	40	(Lithuania)	Grigonis, Marius	1.98 m (6 ft 6 in)	93 kg (205 lb)	32 – 26 April 1994
SF	92	(Lithuania)	Ulanovas, Edgaras	1.99 m (6 ft 6 in)	94 kg (207 lb)	34 – 7 January 1992

Head coach

- (Lithuania) Šarūnas Jasikevičius

Assistant coach(es)

- (Lithuania) Darius Maskoliūnas
- (Lithuania) Tomas Masiulis
- (Lithuania) Evaldas Beržininkaitis

Athletic trainer(s)

- (Lithuania) Nerijus Navickas
- (Lithuania) Justinas Grainys

Doctor

- (Lithuania) Vytautas Kailius

Physiotherapist(s)

- (Lithuania) Paulius Jacikas

Legend

- (C) Team captain
- Injured

- Roster
Updated: May 10, 2020

=== Depth chart ===
Pos.	Starting 5	Bench 1	Bench 2	Bench 3
C	Jock Landale	Zach LeDay	Martinas Geben
PF	Nigel Hayes	Paulius Jankūnas		Erikas Venskus
SF	Edgaras Ulanovas	K. C. Rivers
SG	Marius Grigonis	Artūras Milaknis	Karolis Lukošiūnas
PG	Thomas Walkup	Lukas Lekavičius	Rokas Jokubaitis

=== On loan ===
BC Žalgiris players out on loan
Nat.	Player	Position	Team	On loan since
(Lithuania)	Erikas Venskus	PF	(Lithuania) Žalgiris-2	November 2018
(Lithuania)	Arnas Velička	PG	(Lithuania) CBet	July 2019
(Lithuania)	Laurynas Birutis	C	(Lithuania) CBet	November 2019
(Lithuania)	Gytis Masiulis	PF	(Germany) Skyliners	May 2020

=== Transactions ===
==== Players in ====
No.	Pos.	Nat.	Name	Moving from		Type	Date	Source
34	C	(Australia)	Jock Landale	Partizan Belgrade	(Serbia)	Buyout	May 2019	
10	F	(United States)	Nigel Hayes	Galatasaray Istanbul	(Turkey)	End of contract	June 2019	
4	PG	(Lithuania)	Lukas Lekavičius	Panathinaikos Athens	(Greece)	End of contract	June 2019	
2	PG	(Mexico)	Alex Pérez	Bandırma Banvit	(Turkey)	End of contract	July 2019	
32	C	(United States)	Zach LeDay	Olympiacos Piraeus	(Greece)	Parted ways	July 2019	
23	C	(Lithuania)	Martinas Geben	Juventus Utena	(Lithuania)	End of loan	August 2019	
16	SG	(Lithuania)	Karolis Lukošiūnas	BC Šiauliai	(Lithuania)	Parted ways	August 2019	
1	G/F	(United States)	K. C. Rivers	Real Betis Sevilla	(Spain)	Buyout	November 2019	

==== Players out ====
No.	Pos.	Nat.	Name	Moving to		Type	Date	Source
2	F/C	(Ivory Coast)	Deon Thompson	Unicaja Málaga	(Spain)	End of contract	June 2019	
3	G	(United States)	Nate Wolters	Maccabi Tel Aviv	(Israel)	Buyout	June 2019	
0	C	(Uganda)	Brandon Davies	FC Barcelona	(Spain)	Buyout	July 2019	
44	C	(Lithuania)	Antanas Kavaliauskas			Retired	July 2019	
9	PG	(France)	Léo Westermann	Fenerbahçe Istanbul	(Turkey)	Buyout	July 2019	
30	PF	(United States)	Aaron White	Olimpia Milano	(Italy)	End of contract	July 2019	
8	PG	(Lithuania)	Donatas Sabeckis	Cibona Zagreb	(Croatia)	End of contract^{1}	July 2019	
7	SG	(Lithuania)	Martynas Varnas	CBet Prienai	(Lithuania)	End of contract^{1}	July 2019	
10	G/F	(Lithuania)	Lukas Uleckas	CBet Prienai	(Lithuania)	Parted ways	July 2019	
66	G	(Lithuania)	Paulius Valinskas	Orléans Loiret Basket	(France)	Parted ways^{1}	August 2019	
23	G/F	(Lithuania)	Matas Jogėla	Neptūnas Klaipėda	(Lithuania)	Parted ways^{1}	September 2019	
2	PG	(Mexico)	Alex Pérez			Waived	December 2019	

Notes:

- ^{1} On loan during the 2018–19 season.

== Club ==
=== Technical Staff ===
Position	Staff member
Director	(Lithuania) Paulius Motiejūnas
Sports Director	(Lithuania) Robertas Javtokas
Head coach	(Lithuania) Šarūnas Jasikevičius
Assistant coaches	(Lithuania) Darius Maskoliūnas
Assistant coaches	(Lithuania) Tomas Masiulis
Assistant coaches	(Lithuania) Evaldas Beržininkaitis
Athletic Coaches	(Lithuania) Justinas Grainys
Athletic Coaches	(Lithuania) Nerijus Navickas
Physiotherapist	(Lithuania) Paulius Jacikas
Physician	(Lithuania) Vytautas Kailius
Team Manager	(Lithuania) Mindaugas Kvedaras

== Pre-season games ==
Win Loss

1 September 2019 1	Žalgiris (Lithuania)	75–72	(Lithuania) Lietkabelis	Kaunas
18:30	Scoring by quarter: 17-13, 12-18, 24-23, 22-18
	Pts: LeDay 20; Rebs: Walkup 7 Asts: Pérez 7 PIR: Walkup 21	Boxscore	Pts: Šakić 13; Rebs: Sajus 7 Asts: Brown 6 PIR: Sajus 17	Arena: Žalgirio arena Attendance: not available Referees: Vidmantas Rušinas, Lauras Vitkauskas, Simas Sirtautas

3 September 2019 2	Žalgiris (Lithuania)	85–71	(Russia) Khimki	Kaunas
18:30	Scoring by quarter: 19-9, 27-31, 22-19, 17-12
	Pts: Lukošiūnas 18; Rebs: LeDay 6 Asts: Pérez 5 PIR: Lukošiūnas, Geben 20	Boxscore	Pts: Timma 16; Rebs: Gill 7 Asts: Booker 7 PIR: Booker 20	Arena: Žalgirio arena Attendance: not available Referees: Gytis Vilius, Jurgis Laurinavičius, Artūras Šukys

8 September 2019 3	Kalev/Cramo (Estonia)	71–95	(Lithuania) Žalgiris	Tallinn
17:00	Scoring by quarter: 16-16, 13-30, 20–25, 22-24
	Pts: Coleby 14; Rebs: Coleby 7 Asts: Jackson 7 PIR: Coleby 23	Boxscore	Pts: Milaknis 19; Rebs: Jogėla 6 Asts: three players 3 PIR: Milaknis 24	Arena: Saku Suurhall; Attendance: 4500; Referees: not available

11 September 2019 4	Anadolu Efes (Turkey)	100–98(OT)	(Lithuania) Žalgiris	Belek
20:00	Scoring by quarter: 26-23, 16-21, 25-23, 21-21, Overtime: 12-10
	Pts: Larkin 24; Rebs: Dunston 9 Asts: Beaubois 5 PIR: Beaubois 26	Boxscore	Pts: Hayes 27; Rebs: Walkup 9 Asts: Walkup 7 PIR: Hayes 27	Arena: Gloria Sports Arena; Attendance: 50; Referees: Ilija Belošević, Uroš Nikolić, Denis Hadžić

12 September 2019 5	Žalgiris (Lithuania)	71–70	(Turkey) Galatasaray Doğa Sigorta	Belek
20:00	Scoring by quarter: 20-21, 19-18, 22-10, 10-21
	Pts: LeDay 23; Rebs: Geben, LeDay 6 Asts: Walkup 4 PIR: LeDay 23	Boxscore	Pts: Whittington 16; Rebs: Whittington 10; Asts: Gökalp, Harrison 5 PIR: Whittington 19	Arena: Gloria Sports Arena; Attendance: 250; Referees: Ioannis Foufis, Mykola Ambrosov, Vasiliki Tsouchara

15 September 2019 6	Tofaş (Turkey)	95–100	(Lithuania) Žalgiris	Belek
13:30	Scoring by quarter: 25-19, 25-32, 31-22, 14-27
	Pts: Lojeski 20; Rebs: Williams 6 Asts: Phillip 10; PIR: Lojeski 23	Boxscore	Pts: LeDay 25; Rebs: LeDay 8 Asts: Pérez 8 PIR: LeDay 28	Arena: Gloria Sports Arena; Attendance: 100; Referees: Uroš Nikolić, Mykola Ambrosov, Denis Hadžić

== Competitions ==
=== Overview ===
Competition	Record							
Competition	Pld	W	D	L	PF	PA	PD	Win %
Betsafe-LKL	24	22	0	2	2,135	1,680	+455	91.67
EuroLeague	28	12	0	16	2,213	2,142	+71	42.86
King Mindaugas Cup	4	4	0	0	352	277	+75	100.00
Total	56	38	0	18	4,700	4,099	+601	67.86

Last updated: May 9, 2020
Source: Competitions

=== Betsafe-LKL ===
==== Regular season ====
Pos	Team	Pld	W	L	PF	PA	PD	Qualification or relegation
1	Žalgiris (C)	24	22	2	2135	1680	+455	Already qualified for EuroLeague
2	Rytas	24	17	7	2033	1812	+221	Qualification for Champions League
3	Lietkabelis	24	16	8	1880	1740	+140	Qualification for EuroCup
4	Neptūnas	24	14	10	2009	1933	+76	Qualification for Champions League qualifying rounds
5	Juventus	24	13	11	1847	1877	−30	

Source: LKL
(C) Champions

==== Results summary ====
Overall						Home					Away				
Pld	W	L	PF	PA	PD	W	L	PF	PA	PD	W	L	PF	PA	PD
24	22	2	2135	1680	+455	10	1	959	766	+193	12	1	1176	914	+262

Last updated: May 9, 2020.
Source: Competitive matches

==== Results by round ====
Round	1	2	3	4	5	6	7	8	9	10	11	12	13	14	15	16	17	18	19	20	21	22	23	24
Ground	A	H	A	H	A	A	H	H	A	A	H	H	H	H	A	A	A	H	H	H	A	A	A	A
Result	W	W	W	W	W	W	W	W	W	W	W	W	W	W	W	W	L	W	L	W	W	W	W	W
Position	1	1	1	1	1	1	1	1	1	1	1	1	1	1	1	1	1	1	1	1	1	1	1	1

Last updated: May 9, 2020.
Source: Competitive matches
Ground: A = Away; H = Home; R = Rest. Result: L = Loss; W = Win; R = Rest; P = Postponed.

Win Loss

==== Matches ====
22 September 2019 1	Šiauliai (Lithuania)	63–94	(Lithuania) Žalgiris	Šiauliai
17:20	Scoring by quarter: 21–29, 16–24, 13–23, 13–18
	Pts: Griciūnas 18; Rebs: Gustys 8 Asts: Šaulys, Žemaitis 4 PIR: Gustys 20	Boxscore	Pts: LeDay 17; Rebs: Hayes 7 Asts: Lekavičius 6 PIR: LeDay 22	Arena: Šiaulių arena Attendance: 3700; Referees: Tomas Jasevičius, Juozas Barkauskas, Martynas Karaliūnas

25 September 2019 2	Žalgiris (Lithuania)	81–47	(Lithuania) Pieno žvaigždės	Kaunas
18:50	Scoring by quarter: 17–18, 28–11, 13–13, 23–5
	Pts: Jokubaitis 16; Rebs: Landale 11; Asts: Lukošiūnas 5 PIR: Landale 24	Boxscore	Pts: Petrilevičius 17; Rebs: Thompson 4 Asts: Gillon, Domarkas 3 PIR: Petrilevičius 14	Arena: Žalgirio arena Attendance: 4050; Referees: Jurgis Laurinavičius, Gvidas Gedvilas, Gintaras Mačiulis

28 September 2019 3	Nevėžis (Lithuania)	57–83	(Lithuania) Žalgiris	Kėdainiai
17:00	Scoring by quarter: 21–23, 12–23, 14–18, 10–19
	Pts: Beliauskas 14; Rebs: Kazakauskas 7 Asts: P.Kalaitzakis, Beliauskas 3 PIR: Kazakauskas 14	Boxscore	Pts: LeDay 18; Rebs: Landale, Jankūnas 7 Asts: Lekavičius 7 PIR: LeDay 22	Arena: Kėdainių arena Attendance: 1500; Referees: Vilius Mačiulaitis, Andrius Maleckas, Mindaugas Večerskis

6 October 2019 4	Žalgiris (Lithuania)	96–69	(Lithuania) Lietkabelis	Kaunas
17:20	Scoring by quarter: 22–27, 26–18, 25–10, 23–14
	Pts: LeDay, Ulanovas 15; Rebs: three players 3 Asts: LeDay 6 PIR: LeDay, Ulanovas 22	Boxscore	Pts: Sajus 17; Rebs: Maldūnas 6 Asts: Šakić 4 PIR: Sajus 22	Arena: Žalgirio arena Attendance: 4128; Referees: Jurgis Laurinavičius, Artūras Šukys, Martynas Karaliūnas

13 October 2019 5	Neptūnas (Lithuania)	73–80	(Lithuania) Žalgiris	Klaipėda
17:20	Scoring by quarter: 13–16, 22–18, 13–29, 25–17
	Pts: Gailius 14; Rebs: Sedekerskis, Masiulis 5 Asts: Gailius, Janavičius 3 PIR: Gailius 13	Boxscore	Pts: LeDay 13; Rebs: Lekavičius, Geben 5 Asts: Pérez 4 PIR: LeDay 15	Arena: Švyturio arena Attendance: 4475; Referees: Tomas Jasevičius, Gytis Vilius, Gintaras Vitkauskas

20 October 2019 6	Rytas (Lithuania)	70–88	(Lithuania) Žalgiris	Vilnius
17:20	Scoring by quarter: 21–23, 13–27, 16–20, 20–18
	Pts: Bairstow 12; Rebs: Blaževič 5 Asts: Holloway 3 PIR: Bairstow 12	Boxscore	Pts: Landale, Hayes 15; Rebs: Hayes 5 Asts: Walkup 5 PIR: Ulanovas 20	Arena: Siemens Arena; Attendance: 8254; Referees: Gytis Vilius, Tomas Jasevičius, Gvidas Gedvilas

27 October 2019 7	Žalgiris (Lithuania)	87–55	(Lithuania) CBet	Kaunas
17:20	Scoring by quarter: 17–11, 34–16, 21–18, 15–10
	Pts: Landale 16; Rebs: Lekavičius 7 Asts: Walkup 6 PIR: LeDay 26	Boxscore	Pts: Velička 14; Rebs: Varnas 7 Asts: Velička 7 PIR: Spencer 20	Arena: Žalgirio arena Attendance: 3624; Referees: Gintaras Vitkauskas, Vilius Mačiulaitis, Andrius Maleckas

3 November 2019 8	Žalgiris (Lithuania)	86–80	(Lithuania) Juventus	Kaunas
17:20	Scoring by quarter: 25–18, 12–24, 27–16, 22–22
	Pts: Lekavičius 16; Rebs: LeDay 10; Asts: Walkup 6 PIR: LeDay 15	Boxscore	Pts: Runkauskas 22; Rebs: Tarvydas 6 Asts: Crawford 9 PIR: Runkauskas 21	Arena: Žalgirio arena Attendance: 3282; Referees: Tomas Jasevičius, Andrius Maleckas, Juozas Barkauskas

10 November 2019 9	Sintek–Dzūkija (Lithuania)	65–91	(Lithuania) Žalgiris	Alytus
17:20	Scoring by quarter: 18–17, 21–23, 12–28, 14–23
	Pts: McLane 12; Rebs: three players 5 Asts: Danisevičius 6 PIR: Danisevičius 18	Boxscore	Pts: Landale 14; Rebs: Geben 8 Asts: Jokubaitis 4 PIR: Landale 20	Arena: Alytaus sporto ir rekreacijos centras Attendance: 2972; Referees: Artūras Šukys, Andžej Urbanovič, Aurimas Borusas

17 November 2019 10	Pieno Žvaigždės (Lithuania)	64–108	(Lithuania) Žalgiris	Pasvalys
17:20	Scoring by quarter: 12–31, 9–27, 18–30, 25–20
	Pts: Gillon, Thompson 12; Rebs: Thompson 8 Asts: Domarkas 4 PIR: Thompson 15	Boxscore	Pts: LeDay 21; Rebs: LeDay 7 Asts: Pérez 7 PIR: LeDay 31	Arena: Pieno žvaigždžių arena Attendance: 1200; Referees: Tomas Jasevičius, Mindaugas Večerskis, Darius Šomka

24 November 2019 11	Žalgiris (Lithuania)	102–50	(Lithuania) Sintek–Dzūkija	Kaunas
17:20	Scoring by quarter: 29–14, 27–10, 26–12, 20–14
	Pts: Geben 18; Rebs: Hayes 7 Asts: Jokubaitis 7 PIR: Geben 30	Boxscore	Pts: Peković 9 Rebs: three players 4 Asts: Danisevičius, Bowie 2 PIR: Jomantas 13	Arena: Žalgirio arena Attendance: 2992; Referees: Vilius Mačiulaitis, Juozas Barkauskas, Oleg Barkovskij

1 December 2019 12	Žalgiris (Lithuania)	100–82	(Lithuania) Neptūnas	Kaunas
17:20	Scoring by quarter: 23–17, 19–23, 24–18, 34–24
	Pts: Rivers 18; Rebs: Landale 8 Asts: Walkup 5 PIR: LeDay 20	Boxscore	Pts: Masiulis 15; Rebs: Sedekerskis 7 Asts: Janavičius 7 PIR: Masiulis 23	Arena: Žalgirio arena Attendance: 4358; Referees: Tomas Jasevičius, Gvidas Gedvilas, Martynas Gudas

8 December 2019 13	Žalgiris (Lithuania)	78–72	(Lithuania) Rytas	Kaunas
17:20	Scoring by quarter: 19–27, 18–15, 26-20, 15–10
	Pts: Milaknis 14; Rebs: Landale, Walkup 7 Asts: Walkup 7 PIR: Walkup 19	Boxscore	Pts: Bendžius 17; Rebs: Bendžius 6 Asts: Cruz 5 PIR: Bendžius 20	Arena: Žalgirio arena Attendance: 9724; Referees: Jurgis Laurinavičius, Artūras Šukys, Gintaras Vitkauskas

15 December 2019 14	Žalgiris (Lithuania)	86–80	(Lithuania) Šiauliai	Kaunas
17:20	Scoring by quarter: 17–23, 26–23, 23-14, 20–20
	Pts: Rivers 22; Rebs: Jankūnas 8 Asts: Walkup 7 PIR: Geben 23	Boxscore	Pts: Gustys 22; Rebs: Šaulys, Hardy 6 Asts: DeShields, Urbonas 5 PIR: Gustys 24	Arena: Žalgirio arena Attendance: 2591; Referees: Gvidas Gedvilas, Andžej Urbanovič, Darius Šomka

22 December 2019 15	CBet (Lithuania)	64–105	(Lithuania) Žalgiris	Prienai
16:00	Scoring by quarter: 12–29, 16–22, 21–24, 15–30
	Pts: Birutis 17; Rebs: Birutis 6 Asts: Varnas 3 PIR: Birutis 25	Boxscore	Pts: Ulanovas 24; Rebs: Jankūnas, Geben 6 Asts: Lekavičius 10; PIR: Geben 26	Arena: Prienų sporto arena Attendance: 1421; Referees: Tomas Jasevičius, Mindaugas Večerskis, Mantas Butvilas

30 December 2019 16	Juventus (Lithuania)	77–101	(Lithuania) Žalgiris	Utena
18:50	Scoring by quarter: 11–38, 29–18, 14–23, 23–22
	Pts: Šulskis 14; Rebs: Scott 7 Asts: Scott 7 PIR: Radzevičius 18	Boxscore	Pts: Walkup 15; Rebs: Walkup, Geben 7 Asts: Lekavičius 7 PIR: LeDay 22	Arena: Utenos daugiafunkcis sporto centras Attendance: 2869; Referees: Artūras Šukys, Juozas Barkauskas, Martynas Gudas

5 January 2020 17	Lietkabelis (Lithuania)	83–72	(Lithuania) Žalgiris	Panevėžys
17:20	Scoring by quarter: 23–22, 18–11, 23–19, 19–20
	Pts: Dimša, P. Valinskas 21; Rebs: Lipkevičius 9 Asts: Dimša 6 PIR: Dimša 25	Boxscore	Pts: LeDay, Walkup 12; Rebs: Jankūnas 7 Asts: Lekavičius 6 PIR: LeDay 15	Arena: Cido arena Attendance: 4750; Referees: Gytis Vilius, Gintaras Vitkauskas, Gintaras Mačiulis

11 January 2020 18	Žalgiris (Lithuania)	89–84	(Lithuania) Nevėžis	Kaunas
17:20	Scoring by quarter: 22–17, 32–25, 20-15, 15–27
	Pts: three players 12; Rebs: Geben 8 Asts: four players 4 PIR: Walkup 22	Boxscore	Pts: Beliauskas 28; Rebs: Okouo 8 Asts: Beliauskas 5 PIR: Beliauskas 33	Arena: Žalgirio arena Attendance: 2946; Referees: Gvidas Gedvilas, Juozas Barkauskas, Darius Šomka

19 January 2020 19	Žalgiris (Lithuania)	83–86	(Lithuania) Šiauliai	Kaunas
17:20	Scoring by quarter: 23–17, 14–26, 20-20, 26–23
	Pts: Milaknis 18; Rebs: Ulanovas 8 Asts: Walkup 6 PIR: Ulanovas 20	Boxscore	Pts: Šaulys 20; Rebs: Gustys 10; Asts: Hardy, Urbonas 6 PIR: Šaulys 26	Arena: Žalgirio arena Attendance: 2965; Referees: Artūras Šukys, Martynas Gudas, Oleg Barkovskij

26 January 2020 20	Žalgiris (Lithuania)	71–61	(Lithuania) Rytas	Kaunas
17:20	Scoring by quarter: 10–14, 26–10, 16-20, 19–17
	Pts: Milaknis 17; Rebs: Walkup 8 Asts: Walkup 5 PIR: Walkup 20	Boxscore	Pts: Blaževič 18; Rebs: Butkevičius 7 Asts: Holloway 7 PIR: Girdžiūnas 18	Arena: Žalgirio arena Attendance: 10152; Referees: Tomas Jasevičius, Jurgis Laurinavičius, Andrius Maleckas

1 February 2020 21	Pieno Žvaigždės (Lithuania)	74–77	(Lithuania) Žalgiris	Pasvalys
17:00	Scoring by quarter: 24–27, 22–14, 14–13, 14–23
	Pts: Lapornik 20; Rebs: Thompson, Petrilevičius 5 Asts: Lasenbergs 5 PIR: Bruesewitz 19	Boxscore	Pts: Hayes 15; Rebs: Hayes 8 Asts: Walkup 5 PIR: Walkup 14	Arena: Pieno žvaigždžių arena Attendance: 1200; Referees: Artūras Šukys, Gintaras Mačiulis, Martynas Karaliūnas

9 February 2020 22	Nevėžis (Lithuania)	63–92	(Lithuania) Žalgiris	Kėdainiai
17:00	Scoring by quarter: 13–17, 16–32, 13–25, 21–18
	Pts: G.Kalaitzakis 21; Rebs: Kazakauskas 8 Asts: G.Kalaitzakis 5 PIR: G.Kalaitzakis 24	Boxscore	Pts: Ulanovas 15; Rebs: Ulanovas 7 Asts: Jokubaitis 7 PIR: Ulanovas 29	Arena: Kėdainių Arena; Attendance: 2300; Referees: Gytis Vilius, Aurimas Borusas, Martynas Gudas

1 March 2020 23	CBet (Lithuania)	79–94	(Lithuania) Žalgiris	Prienai
17:20	Scoring by quarter: 15–27, 22–30, 14–18, 28–19
	Pts: Miniotas 17; Rebs: Birutis 13; Asts: Lukauskis 6 PIR: Lukauskis 24	Boxscore	Pts: Geben 15; Rebs: Geben 9 Asts: Walkup 7 PIR: Geben 23	Arena: Prienų sporto arena Attendance: 950; Referees: Jurgis Laurinavičius, Mindaugas Večerskis, Darius Šomka

8 March 2020 24	Juventus (Lithuania)	82–91	(Lithuania) Žalgiris	Utena
17:20	Scoring by quarter: 19–21, 16–26, 18–23, 29–21
	Pts: Jucikas 20; Rebs: Radzevičius 5 Asts: Šulskis 4 PIR: Jucikas 26	Boxscore	Pts: Milaknis 20; Rebs: LeDay 6 Asts: Jokubaitis 7 PIR: LeDay, Jokubaitis 23	Arena: Utenos daugiafunkcis sporto centras Attendance: 2408; Referees: Tomas Jasevičius, Gvidas Gedvilas, Aurimas Borusas

==== Postponed matches ====
15 March 2020 25	Žalgiris (Lithuania)	vs.	(Lithuania) Neptūnas	Kaunas
				Arena: Žalgirio arena
Note: On 13 March 2020, the board of the LKL decided to end the season due to the COVID-19 pandemic. Along with this decision, they crowned regular season champions Žalgiris as the new Lithuanian champions.

17 March 2020 26	Sintek-Dzūkija (Lithuania)	vs.	(Lithuania) Žalgiris	Alytus
				Arena: Alytaus Sporto ir Rekreacijos centras
Note: On 13 March 2020, the board of the LKL decided to end the season due to the COVID-19 pandemic. Along with this decision, they crowned regular season champions Žalgiris as the new Lithuanian champions.

29 March 2020 27	Žalgiris (Lithuania)	vs.	(Lithuania) Lietkabelis	Kaunas
				Arena: Žalgirio arena
Note: On 13 March 2020, the board of the LKL decided to end the season due to the COVID-19 pandemic. Along with this decision, they crowned regular season champions Žalgiris as the new Lithuanian champions.

5 April 2020 28	Neptūnas (Lithuania)	vs.	(Lithuania) Žalgiris	Klaipėda
				Arena: Švyturio arena
Note: On 13 March 2020, the board of the LKL decided to end the season due to the COVID-19 pandemic. Along with this decision, they crowned regular season champions Žalgiris as the new Lithuanian champions.

13 April 2020 29	Rytas (Lithuania)	vs.	(Lithuania) Žalgiris	Vilnius
				Arena: Siemens Arena
Note: On 13 March 2020, the board of the LKL decided to end the season due to the COVID-19 pandemic. Along with this decision, they crowned regular season champions Žalgiris as the new Lithuanian champions.

15 April 2020 30	Žalgiris (Lithuania)	vs.	(Lithuania) Pieno Žvaigždės	Kaunas
				Arena: Žalgirio arena
Note: On 13 March 2020, the board of the LKL decided to end the season due to the COVID-19 pandemic. Along with this decision, they crowned regular season champions Žalgiris as the new Lithuanian champions.

19 April 2020 31	Lietkabelis (Lithuania)	vs.	(Lithuania) Žalgiris	Panevėžys
				Arena: Cido Arena
Note: On 13 March 2020, the board of the LKL decided to end the season due to the COVID-19 pandemic. Along with this decision, they crowned regular season champions Žalgiris as the new Lithuanian champions.

22 April 2020 32	Žalgiris (Lithuania)	vs.	(Lithuania) CBet	Kaunas
				Arena: Žalgirio arena
Note: On 13 March 2020, the board of the LKL decided to end the season due to the COVID-19 pandemic. Along with this decision, they crowned regular season champions Žalgiris as the new Lithuanian champions.

25 April 2020 33	Žalgiris (Lithuania)	vs.	(Lithuania) Juventus	Kaunas
				Arena: Žalgirio arena
Note: On 13 March 2020, the board of the LKL decided to end the season due to the COVID-19 pandemic. Along with this decision, they crowned regular season champions Žalgiris as the new Lithuanian champions.

30 April 2020 34	Žalgiris (Lithuania)	vs.	(Lithuania) Nevėžis	Kaunas
				Arena: Žalgirio arena
Note: On 13 March 2020, the board of the LKL decided to end the season due to the COVID-19 pandemic. Along with this decision, they crowned regular season champions Žalgiris as the new Lithuanian champions.

4 May 2020 35	Žalgiris (Lithuania)	vs.	(Lithuania) Sintek–Dzūkija	Kaunas
				Arena: Žalgirio arena
Note: On 13 March 2020, the board of the LKL decided to end the season due to the COVID-19 pandemic. Along with this decision, they crowned regular season champions Žalgiris as the new Lithuanian champions.

7 May 2020 36	Šiauliai (Lithuania)	vs.	(Lithuania) Žalgiris	Šiauliai
				Arena: Šiaulių arena
Note: On 13 March 2020, the board of the LKL decided to end the season due to the COVID-19 pandemic. Along with this decision, they crowned regular season champions Žalgiris as the new Lithuanian champions.

=== EuroLeague ===
==== Regular season ====
Pos	Team	Pld	W	L	PF	PA	PD
7	(Russia) Khimki	28	13	15	2393	2380	+13
8	(Turkey) Fenerbahçe Beko	28	13	15	2153	2188	−35
9	(Lithuania) Žalgiris	28	12	16	2213	2142	+71
10	(Spain) Valencia Basket	28	12	16	2252	2273	−21
11	(Greece) Olympiacos	28	12	16	2243	2282	−39

Source: EuroLeague
Rules for classification: All points scored in extra period(s) were not counted in the standings, nor for any tie-break situation.

==== Results summary ====
Overall						Home					Away				
Pld	W	L	PF	PA	PD	W	L	PF	PA	PD	W	L	PF	PA	PD
28	12	16	2213	2142	+71	7	7	1111	1054	+57	5	9	1102	1088	+14

Last updated: May 9, 2020.
Source: Competitive matches

==== Results by round ====
Round	1	2	3	4	5	6	7	8	9	10	11	12	13	14	15	16	17	18	19	20	21	22	23	24	25	26	27	28	29	30	31	32	33	34
Ground	H	A	H	H	H	A	H	A	H	H	A	A	H	H	A	A	H	A	H	A	H	A	H	A	A	H	H	A	A	A	H	A	H	H
Result	L	L	W	W	L	W	L	L	L	L	L	L	L	L	L	W	W	L	W	L	W	W	W	L	W	W	W	L						
Position	14	16	14	9	10	8	11	11	12	14	17	17	17	17	18	17	16	16	15	16	15	13	11	13	12	10	8	9						

Last updated: March 6, 2020.
Source: Competitive matches
Ground: A = Away; H = Home; R = Rest. Result: L = Loss; W = Win; R = Rest; P = Postponed.

Win Loss

==== Matches ====
4 October 2019 1	Žalgiris (Lithuania)	58–70	(Spain) Kirolbet Baskonia	Kaunas
19:00	Scoring by quarter: 19–19, 11–18, 16–18, 12–15
	Pts: Grigonis, Lekavičius 10; Rebs: Hayes 7 Asts: Grigonis, Hayes 3 PIR: Ulanovas 20	Boxscore	Pts: Shields 19; Rebs: Henry, Polonara 6 Asts: Vildoza 5 PIR: Shields 21	Arena: Žalgirio Arena; Attendance: 15,151; Referees: Christos Christodoulou, Uroš Obrknežević, Sašo Petek

11 October 2019 2	A|X Armani Exchange Milan (Italy)	85–81	(Lithuania) Žalgiris	Assago
20:45	Scoring by quarter: 23–7, 20–29, 21–23, 21–22
	Pts: Rodríguez 17; Rebs: Tarczewski 6 Asts: Rodríguez 6 PIR: Brooks, Rodríguez 24	Boxscore	Pts: Walkup 19; Rebs: Hayes 5 Asts: Lekavičius 4 PIR: Walkup 24	Arena: Mediolanum Forum; Attendance: 7,218; Referees: Juan Carlos García González, Mehdi Difallah, Ioannis Foufis

17 October 2019 3	Žalgiris (Lithuania)	86–73	(Spain) Real Madrid	Kaunas
19:00	Scoring by quarter: 18–15, 20–19, 19–26, 29–13
	Pts: LeDay 26; Rebs: LeDay 9 Asts: Grigonis 5 PIR: LeDay 35	Boxscore	Pts: Randolph 15; Rebs: Mickey 6 Asts: Llull 4 PIR: Randolph 15	Arena: Žalgirio Arena; Attendance: 15,109; Referees: Sreten Radović, Robert Lottermoser, Seffi Shemmesh

25 October 2019 4	Žalgiris (Lithuania)	70–56	(France) LDLC ASVEL	Kaunas
19:00	Scoring by quarter: 14–20, 19–8, 22–17, 15–11
	Pts: LeDay 13; Rebs: LeDay 8 Asts: Walkup 4 PIR: Walkup 19	Boxscore	Pts: Jekiri 10; Rebs: Jekiri 10; Asts: Jackson 4 PIR: Jekiri 17	Arena: Žalgirio Arena; Attendance: 14,828; Referees: Matej Boltauzer, Spiros Gkontas, Jordi Aliaga

30 October 2019 5	Žalgiris (Lithuania)	70–82(OT)	(Russia) Zenit Saint Petersburg	Kaunas
19:00	Scoring by quarter: 18–14, 10–14, 15–16, 19–18, Overtime: 8–20
	Pts: LeDay, Ulanovas 12; Rebs: Walkup 7 Asts: LeDay 10; PIR: LeDay 20	Boxscore	Pts: Ponitka 19; Rebs: Ponitka 7 Asts: Ayón 5 PIR: Ponitka 27	Arena: Žalgirio Arena; Attendance: 13,189; Referees: Miguel Ángel Pérez Pérez, Carmelo Paternicò, Tomasz Trawicki

1 November 2019 6	Fenerbahçe Beko (Turkey)	76–79	(Lithuania) Žalgiris	Istanbul
18:45	Scoring by quarter: 17–17, 23–16, 19–19, 17–27
	Pts: de Colo 29; Rebs: Veselý 6 Asts: Sloukas 9 PIR: de Colo 28	Boxscore	Pts: Grigonis 19; Rebs: Jankūnas 6 Asts: Walkup 5 PIR: Grigonis 23	Arena: Ülker Sports and Event Hall; Attendance: 10,378; Referees: Robert Lottermoser, Juan Carlos García González, Milivoje Jovčić

8 November 2019 7	Žalgiris (Lithuania)	86–93	(Spain) Barcelona	Kaunas
19:00	Scoring by quarter: 20–23, 20–24, 21–19, 25–27
	Pts: LeDay 16; Rebs: Hayes 5 Asts: Walkup 5 PIR: Walkup 18	Boxscore	Pts: Higgins 27; Rebs: Davies, Mirotić 6 Asts: Delaney 7 PIR: Higgins 33	Arena: Žalgirio Arena; Attendance: 15,342; Referees: Borys Ryzhyk, Fernando Rocha, Sašo Petek

15 November 2019 8	Olympiacos (Greece)	83–74	(Lithuania) Žalgiris	Piraeus
20:30	Scoring by quarter: 19–18, 18–21, 23–16, 23–19
	Pts: Spanoulis 16; Rebs: Milutinov 8 Asts: Spanoulis 7 PIR: Milutinov 27	Boxscore	Pts: Landale 23; Rebs: three players 4 Asts: Walkup 5 PIR: Landale 23	Arena: Peace and Friendship Stadium; Attendance: 5,516; Referees: Ilija Belošević, Carlos Cortés, Tomislav Hordov

19 November 2019 9	Žalgiris (Lithuania)	85–86	(Greece) Panathinaikos OPAP	Kaunas
19:00	Scoring by quarter: 16–19, 17–22, 20–23, 32–22
	Pts: LeDay 15; Rebs: Landale 8 Asts: Lekavičius, Walkup 5 PIR: Ulanovas 15	Boxscore	Pts: Calathes 19; Rebs: Calathes, Papapetrou 5 Asts: Calathes 12; PIR: Calathes 32	Arena: Žalgirio Arena; Attendance: 14,901; Referees: Miguel Ángel Pérez Pérez, Milan Nedović, Tomasz Trawicki

21 November 2019 10	Žalgiris (Lithuania)	59–61	(Serbia) Crvena zvezda mts	Kaunas
19:00	Scoring by quarter: 21–16, 10–17, 15–14, 13–14
	Pts: Grigonis, Ulanovas 11; Rebs: Jankūnas 7 Asts: Walkup 4 PIR: Ulanovas 15	Boxscore	Pts: Baron 14; Rebs: Faye 7 Asts: L. Brown 3 PIR: L. Brown 19	Arena: Žalgirio Arena; Attendance: 14,033; Referees: Daniel Hierrezuelo, Anne Panther, Robert Vyklický

28 November 2019 11	ALBA Berlin (Germany)	69–62	(Lithuania) Žalgiris	Berlin
20:00	Scoring by quarter: 15–7, 17–19, 15–20, 22–16
	Pts: Giffey 13; Rebs: Giedraitis 8 Asts: Siva 6 PIR: Giffey 21	Boxscore	Pts: LeDay 15; Rebs: Landale 7 Asts: Walkup 5 PIR: Lekavičius 15	Arena: Mercedes-Benz Arena; Attendance: 10,121; Referees: Juan Carlos García González, Fernando Rocha, Josip Radojković

5 December 2019 12	CSKA Moscow (Russia)	85–82(OT)	(Lithuania) Žalgiris	Moscow
18:00	Scoring by quarter: 9–17, 23–14, 19–19, 18–19, Overtime: 16–13
	Pts: James 19; Rebs: Bolomboy 6 Asts: Hackett 6 PIR: James 18	Boxscore	Pts: Walkup 19; Rebs: Landale 11; Asts: Walkup 6 PIR: Walkup 22	Arena: Megasport Arena; Attendance: 6,114; Referees: Sreten Radović, Emilio Pérez Pizarro, Uroš Obrknežević

13 December 2019 13	Žalgiris (Lithuania)	82–86	(Spain) Valencia Basket	Kaunas
19:00	Scoring by quarter: 21–19, 27–28, 9–17, 25–22
	Pts: Ulanovas 16; Rebs: Landale 4 Asts: Walkup 7 PIR: Lekavičius, Walkup 15	Boxscore	Pts: Labeyrie 22; Rebs: Abalde, Labeyrie 5 Asts: Colom 9 PIR: Colom, Labeyrie 22	Arena: Žalgirio Arena; Attendance: 14,752; Referees: Robert Lottermoser, Matej Boltauzer, Aare Halliko

17 December 2019 14	Žalgiris (Lithuania)	68–74	(Turkey) Anadolu Efes	Kaunas
19:00	Scoring by quarter: 17–26, 26–16, 10–13, 15–19
	Pts: Landale 16; Rebs: Ulanovas 7 Asts: Lekavičius, Walkup 5 PIR: Ulanovas 21	Boxscore	Pts: Micić, Pleiss 18; Rebs: Singleton 10; Asts: three players 3 PIR: Pleiss 21	Arena: Žalgirio Arena; Attendance: 14,110; Referees: Ilija Belošević, Carmelo Paternicò, Jordi Aliaga

20 December 2019 15	Khimki (Russia)	83–74	(Lithuania) Žalgiris	Mytishchi
18:00	Scoring by quarter: 21–16, 17–17, 19–16, 26–25
	Pts: Jović, Shved 25; Rebs: Gill 7 Asts: Kramer, Shved 5 PIR: Jović 29	Boxscore	Pts: Landale 24; Rebs: Jankūnas, Landale 5 Asts: Walkup 6 PIR: Landale 30	Arena: Mytishchi Arena; Attendance: 4,872; Referees: Christos Christodoulou, Carlos Peruga, Seffi Shemmesh

27 December 2019 16	Bayern Munich (Germany)	73–98	(Lithuania) Žalgiris	Munich
20:30	Scoring by quarter: 13–21, 22–22, 15–25, 23–30
	Pts: Barthel 20; Rebs: Monroe 7 Asts: Lô 7 PIR: Barthel 23	Boxscore	Pts: LeDay, Milaknis 19; Rebs: Jankūnas, LeDay 5 Asts: Walkup 11; PIR: Walkup 26	Arena: Audi Dome; Attendance: 5,989; Referees: Miguel Ángel Pérez Pérez, Milivoje Jovčić, Ersan Kartal

2 January 2020 17	Žalgiris (Lithuania)	73–68	(Israel) Maccabi Tel Aviv	Kaunas
19:00	Scoring by quarter: 17–21, 12–13, 24–19, 20–15
	Pts: Lekavičius 23; Rebs: Walkup 7 Asts: Walkup 3 PIR: Lekavičius 20	Boxscore	Pts: Cohen 20; Rebs: Cohen, Reynolds 7 Asts: Caloiaro 5 PIR: Cohen 23	Arena: Žalgirio Arena; Attendance: 14,973; Referees: Saša Pukl, Joseph Bissang, Uroš Nikolić

9 January 2020 18	Real Madrid (Spain)	88–82	(Lithuania) Žalgiris	Madrid
21:00	Scoring by quarter: 20–18, 27–23, 21–18, 20–23
	Pts: Thompkins 20; Rebs: Thompkins 5 Asts: Campazzo 8 PIR: Thompkins 21	Boxscore	Pts: Lekavičius 21; Rebs: three players 4 Asts: Walkup 6 PIR: Lekavičius 20	Arena: WiZink Center; Attendance: 9,096; Referees: Damir Javor, Michele Rossi, Aare Halliko

15 January 2020 19	Crvena zvezda mts (Serbia)	70–76	(Lithuania) Žalgiris	Belgrade
19:00	Scoring by quarter: 20–22, 18–16, 15–19, 17–19
	Pts: L. Brown 14; Rebs: Kuzmić 8 Asts: L. Brown 6 PIR: Kuzmić 20	Boxscore	Pts: Lekavičius 17; Rebs: Landale 9 Asts: Landale 4 PIR: Lekavičius 22	Arena: Štark Arena; Attendance: 15,874; Referees: Borys Ryzhyk, Fernando Rocha, Spiros Gkontas

17 January 2020 20	Panathinaikos OPAP (Greece)	96–94	(Lithuania) Žalgiris	Athens
20:30	Scoring by quarter: 18–27, 28–22, 25–17, 25–28
	Pts: Rice 20; Rebs: Thomas 8 Asts: Calathes 11; PIR: Rice 26	Boxscore	Pts: Lekavičius, Walkup 16; Rebs: Landale 7 Asts: Walkup 7 PIR: Walkup 20	Arena: O.A.K.A. Attendance: 9,513; Referees: Ilija Belošević, Carlos Cortés, Piotr Pastusiak

24 January 2020 21	Žalgiris (Lithuania)	104–80	(Germany) ALBA Berlin	Kaunas
19:00	Scoring by quarter: 23–9, 31–18, 30–25, 20–28
	Pts: Rivers 17; Rebs: Hayes, Landale 7 Asts: Walkup 7 PIR: Hayes 19	Boxscore	Pts: Nnoko 15; Rebs: Nnoko 7 Asts: Siva 4 PIR: Nnoko 27	Arena: Žalgirio Arena; Attendance: 14,869; Referees: Carmelo Paternicò, Tomislav Hordov, Milan Nedović

30 January 2020 22	LDLC ASVEL (France)	74–79	(Lithuania) Žalgiris	Villeurbanne
20:45	Scoring by quarter: 16–16, 11–14, 23–25, 24–24
	Pts: Taylor 15; Rebs: Jekiri 7 Asts: Maledon 5 PIR: Lighty 17	Boxscore	Pts: Lekavičius 21; Rebs: LeDay, Walkup 6 Asts: Walkup 4 PIR: Walkup 21	Arena: Astroballe; Attendance: 5,171; Referees: Miguel Ángel Pérez Pérez, Sašo Petek, Vasiliki Tsaroucha

4 February 2020 23	Žalgiris (Lithuania)	94–69	(Greece) Olympiacos	Kaunas
19:00	Scoring by quarter: 22–17, 24–20, 23–11, 25–21
	Pts: Milaknis 19; Rebs: LeDay 6 Asts: Jokubaitis, Ulanovas 6 PIR: Walkup 16	Boxscore	Pts: Vezenkov 15; Rebs: Milutinov 13; Asts: Paul 5 PIR: Milutinov 23	Arena: Žalgirio Arena; Attendance: 14,875; Referees: Robert Lottermoser, Oļegs Latiševs, Jordi Aliaga

6 February 2020 24	Anadolu Efes (Turkey)	96–91	(Lithuania) Žalgiris	Istanbul
18:30	Scoring by quarter: 19–20, 21–23, 23–22, 33–26
	Pts: Larkin 25; Rebs: Moerman, Singleton 5 Asts: Larkin 4 PIR: Larkin 27	Boxscore	Pts: LeDay 22; Rebs: LeDay 6 Asts: Walkup 8 PIR: LeDay 23	Arena: Sinan Erdem Dome; Attendance: 14,803; Referees: Christos Christodoulou, Emilio Perez, Sergio Silva

20 February 2020 25	Kirolbet Baskonia (Spain)	60–74	(Lithuania) Žalgiris	Vitoria-Gasteiz
21:00	Scoring by quarter: 17–13, 18–17, 10–21, 15–23
	Pts: Christon 17; Rebs: Shields 5 Asts: Shengelia, Shields 5 PIR: Shengelia 14	Boxscore	Pts: Ulanovas 15; Rebs: Ulanovas 7 Asts: Walkup 6 PIR: LeDay 16	Arena: Buesa Arena; Attendance: 10,068; Referees: Matej Boltauzer, Spiros Gkontas, Miloš Koljenšić

28 February 2020 26	Žalgiris (Lithuania)	105–97(OT)	(Italy) A|X Armani Exchange Milan	Kaunas
19:00	Scoring by quarter: 27−25, 26−19, 19−27, 19−20, Overtime: 14−6
	Pts: Hayes 21; Rebs: Ulanovas 6 Asts: Ulanovas 6 PIR: Hayes, Ulanovas 25	Boxscore	Pts: three players 18; Rebs: Micov 7 Asts: Rodriguez 8 PIR: Micov, Rodriguez 21	Arena: Žalgirio Arena; Attendance: 9,405; Referees: Daniel Hierrezuelo, Robert Vyklicky, Eduard Udyanskyy

3 March 2020 27	Žalgiris (Lithuania)	96–85	(Russia) Khimki	Kaunas
19:00	Scoring by quarter: 29–15, 21–19, 14–24, 32–27
	Pts: LeDay 23; Rebs: three players 5 Asts: Walkup 7 PIR: LeDay 26	Boxscore	Pts: Shved 24; Rebs: Jerebko 10; Asts: Jović 7 PIR: Jerebko 25	Arena: Žalgirio Arena; Attendance: 13,551 (tentative); Referees: Sreten Radovic, Seffi Shemmesh, Michele Rossi

5 March 2020 28	Zenit Saint Petersburg (Russia)	76–75(OT)	(Lithuania) Žalgiris	Saint Petersburg
18:00	Scoring by quarter: 12–27, 25–14, 10–12, 19–13, Overtime: 10–9
	Pts: Albicy 19; Rebs: Albicy, Ayón 5 Asts: Albicy 4 PIR: Albicy 24	Boxscore	Pts: Landale 27; Rebs: Jankūnas 9 Asts: Walkup 11; PIR: Landale 30	Arena: Sibur Arena; Attendance: 4,269 (tentative); Referees: Luigi Lamonica, Joseph Bissang, Tomislav Hordov

==== Postponed matches ====
13 March 2020 29	Barcelona (Spain)	vs.	(Lithuania) Žalgiris	Barcelona
21:00
		Boxscore		Arena: Palau Blaugrana
Note: Postponed due to the COVID-19 pandemic.

20 March 2020 30	Valencia Basket (Spain)	vs.	(Lithuania) Žalgiris	Valencia
21:00
		Boxscore		Arena: La Fonteta
Note: Postponed due to the COVID-19 pandemic.

24 March 2020 31	Žalgiris (Lithuania)	vs.	(Turkey) Fenerbahçe Beko	Kaunas
19:00
		Boxscore		Arena: Žalgirio Arena
Note: Postponed due to the COVID-19 pandemic.

26 March 2020 32	Maccabi Tel Aviv (Israel)	vs.	(Lithuania) Žalgiris	Tel Aviv
20:05
		Boxscore		Arena: Menora Mivtachim Arena
Note: Postponed due to the COVID-19 pandemic.

3 April 2020 33	Žalgiris (Lithuania)	vs.	(Russia) CSKA Moscow	Kaunas
19:00
		Boxscore		Arena: Žalgirio Arena
Note: Postponed due to the COVID-19 pandemic.

10 April 2020 34	Žalgiris (Lithuania)	vs.	(Germany) Bayern Munich	Kaunas
19:00
		Boxscore		Arena: Žalgirio Arena
Note: Postponed due to the COVID-19 pandemic.

=== King Mindaugas Cup ===
The 2020 King Mindaugas Cup was 5th instance of the tournament presented to public on 1 December 2015, to replace the LKF Cup and the LKL All-Star Day. Final Four tournament was held in Švyturio arena, Klaipėda. Žalgiris set the new King Mindaugas Cup record, defeating Rytas 80:60 and becoming new Cup holders. Edgaras Ulanovas was named the Finals MVP. Forward scored 13 points, dished three assists, stole the ball twice and recorded 16 efficiency rating. It was the third time Ulanovas became King Mindaugas Cup Finals MVP.

Win Loss

21 January 2020 Quarterfinals	Šiauliai (Lithuania)	79–85	(Lithuania) Žalgiris	Šiauliai
17:00	Scoring by quarter: 15-20, 25-17, 16-26, 23-22
	Pts: Gustys 22; Rebs: Gustys 16; Asts: DeShields 5 PIR: Gustys 37	Boxscore	Pts: Hayes 22; Rebs: Jankūnas, Walkup 5 Asts: four players 4 PIR: Hayes 24	Arena: Šiaulių arena Attendance: 4200; Referees: Gytis Vilius, Andžej Urbanovič, Aurimas Borusas

12 February 2020 Quarterfinals	Žalgiris (Lithuania)	105–66	(Lithuania) Šiauliai	Kaunas
17:00	Scoring by quarter: 28-17, 20-12, 36-22, 21-15
	Pts: Jokubaitis 17; Rebs: Landale 6 Asts: Jankūnas 4 PIR: LeDay, Landale 21	Boxscore	Pts: Griciūnas 23; Rebs: Gustys 10; Asts: Urbonas 7 PIR: Gustys 32	Arena: Žalgirio arena Attendance: 2763; Referees: Gintaras Vitkauskas, Vilius Mačiulaitis, Mindaugas Večerskis

15 February 2020 Semifinals	Žalgiris (Lithuania)	82–72	(Lithuania) Lietkabelis	Klaipėda
14:00	Scoring by quarter: 19-17, 19-21, 27-14, 17-20
	Pts: Ulanovas 17; Rebs: LeDay 6 Asts: Lekavičius 5 PIR: Ulanovas 25	Boxscore	Pts: P.Valinskas 14; Rebs: Maldūnas 9 Asts: Normantas 4 PIR: three players 13	Arena: Švyturio arena Attendance: 2527; Referees: Tomas Jasevičius, Artūras Šukys, Gvidas Gedvilas

16 February 2020 Final	Žalgiris (Lithuania)	80–60	(Lithuania) Rytas	Klaipėda
17:50	Scoring by quarter: 24-21, 15-15, 21-7, 20-17
	Pts: LeDay, Ulanovas 13; Rebs: Jankūnas 7 Asts: Walkup 8 PIR: Jankūnas 17	Boxscore	Pts: Cruz 14; Rebs: Cruz, Bendžius 6 Asts: Holloway 4 PIR: Bendžius 13	Arena: Švyturio arena Attendance: 5680; Referees: Gytis Vilius, Tomas Jasevičius, Jurgis Laurinavičius

== Individual awards ==
=== King Mindaugas Cup Finals MVP ===
- (Lithuania) Edgaras Ulanovas

== Statistics ==
Legend
GP	Games played	GS	Games started	MPG	Minutes per game
FG%	Field-goal percentage	3FG%	3-point field-goal percentage	FT%	Free-throw percentage
RPG	Rebounds per game	APG	Assists per game	SPG	Steals per game
BPG	Blocks per game	PPG	Points per game	PIR	PIR per game

Player	Left during season

=== Betsafe-LKL ===
Player	GP	MPG	2FG%	3FG%	FT%	RPG	APG	SPG	PPG	PIR
Martinas Geben	24	16:22	.722	.200	.847	4.3	1.5	0.6	8	11.6
Marius Grigonis	7	17:21	.467	.364	.909	1.9	1.7	0.1	6.9	8
Nigel Hayes	24	19:23	.494	.350	.767	3	1.3	1.1	7.1	6.9
Paulius Jankūnas	23	15:46	.506	.476	.842	4.4	1.3	0.6	6.1	10.2
Rokas Jokubaitis	19	17:12	.590	.457	.808	2.1	2.6	0.5	7.4	8.8
Jock Landale	23	15:01	.605	.393	.731	3.9	1.3	0.2	7.3	9
Zach LeDay	24	16:34	.597	.556	.838	4.2	0.9	0.8	11	14.6
Lukas Lekavičius	24	17:28	.471	.283	.920	1.3	3.8	0.6	6.4	7
Karolis Lukošiūnas	18	16:55	.500	.375	.400	0.9	1	0.6	6.3	2.6
Artūras Milaknis	24	18:51	.667	.440	.938	1.3	0.7	0.8	7.6	6.6
K. C. Rivers	13	16:55	.586	.446	1.000	2.5	1.6	0.8	9.1	8.9
Edgaras Ulanovas	23	18:27	.596	.458	.817	3.3	1.7	0.7	9.6	12.4
Erikas Venskus	4	10:56	.750	.000	.000	2.8	0	0.8	4.5	6
Thomas Walkup	22	16:59	.557	.395	.826	3.2	4.2	1	7.1	11.9
Alex Pérez	7	20:05	.520	.154	.813	2.1	3.4	1	6.4	8.7

Last updated: May 9, 2020.

=== EuroLeague ===
Player	GP	GS	MPG	2FG%	3FG%	FT%	RPG	APG	SPG	BPG	PPG	PIR
Martinas Geben	20	9	8:08	.659	.000	.765	1.9	0.4	0.3	0.3	3.5	4.0
Marius Grigonis	10	10	25:45	.512	.386	.846	2.6	2.0	0.5	0.1	11.5	11.0
Nigel Hayes	28	10	22:18	.438	.372	.758	3.5	1.0	0.4	0.2	6.3	6.6
Paulius Jankūnas	27	12	13:41	.481	.143	.759	3.1	0.8	0.4	0.1	3.0	4.9
Rokas Jokubaitis	10	0	6:25	.417	.500	.750	0.5	1.3	0.3	0.0	2.2	2.0
Jock Landale	25	19	20:32	.646	.302	.821	4.4	1.0	0.5	0.2	11.0	10.4
Zach LeDay	28	6	22:21	.516	.433	.844	4.7	1.0	0.5	0.7	11.8	13.2
Lukas Lekavičius	27	3	19:55	.584	.392	.862	1.3	2.8	0.5	0.0	10.5	10.2
Karolis Lukošiūnas	6	0	2:43	.000	.200	.000	1.0	0.5	0.0	0.0	0.5	0.8
Artūras Milaknis	28	10	22:04	.706	.395	.833	1.5	0.6	0.9	0.0	7.4	5.7
K. C. Rivers	18	8	21:22	.528	.412	.900	1.5	1.1	0.9	0.0	9.3	6.7
Edgaras Ulanovas	28	28	25:49	.466	.368	.813	3.3	2.0	0.4	0.1	8.3	9.7
Erikas Venskus	2	0	1:48	.000	.000	.000	0.5	0.0	0.0	0.0	0.0	1.0
Thomas Walkup	28	21	25:45	.507	.467	.857	3.6	5.5	1.0	0.1	9.6	12.7
Kerr Kriisa	1	0	2:09	.000	.000	.500	0.0	0.0	0.0	0.0	1.0	0.0
Alex Pérez	7	4	10:38	.357	.500	1.000	0.9	1.9	0.4	0.0	3.1	2.9

Last updated: May 6, 2020.
Source: EuroLeague
