= Marius Leonavičius =

Lithuanian basketball coach

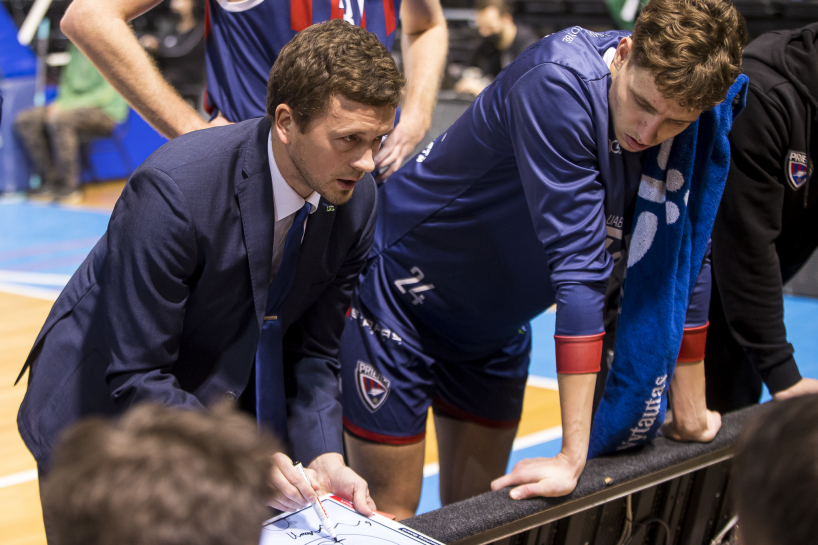
- Marius Leonavičius during LKL game

JL Bourg
- Position: Assistant coach
- League: LNB Élite

Personal information
- Born: August 18, 1984 (age 42) Prienai, Lithuania
- Coaching career: 2013–present

Career history

Coaching
- 2014–2021: BC Prienai (assistant)
- 2021–2022: BC Prienai
- 2022–2023: JL Bourg (U18)
- 2023–2025: BC Wolves (assistant)
- 2025–present: JL Bourg (assistant)

Career highlights
- As assistant coach: EuroCup champion (2026); Baltic Basketball League winner (2017); European North Basketball League runners-up (2023)

Marius Leonavičius (born August 18, 1984 in Prienai, Lithuania) is a Lithuanian basketball coach who currently serves as an assistant coach for JL Bourg of the French LNB Élite.

== Coaching career ==
After graduating from Lithuanian Sports University (Lithuanian Academy of Physical Education at the time) Leonavičius started his coaching career in Dublin, Ireland coaching for a local basketball club Tolka Rovers. In 2012, he became an assistant coach for the Trinity College Dublin men's basketball team. Several months later he was appointed as the head men's basketball coach.

In 2013, Leonavičius returned home to Lithuania and started coaching in his hometown of Prienai. He was the head coach of U18 and U16 boys basketball teams.

=== BC Prienai ===
At the beginning of the 2014-15 season, Leonavičius was signed as an assistant coach for the BC Prienai (later on known as Skycop / Vytautas / Labas Gas) of the Lithuanian Basketball League. During his tenure as an assistant, he coached under legendary Lithuanian coach Virginijus Šeškus, as well as Mantas Šernius, who was named Lithuanian Basketball League's Coach of the year in his final season in 2021.

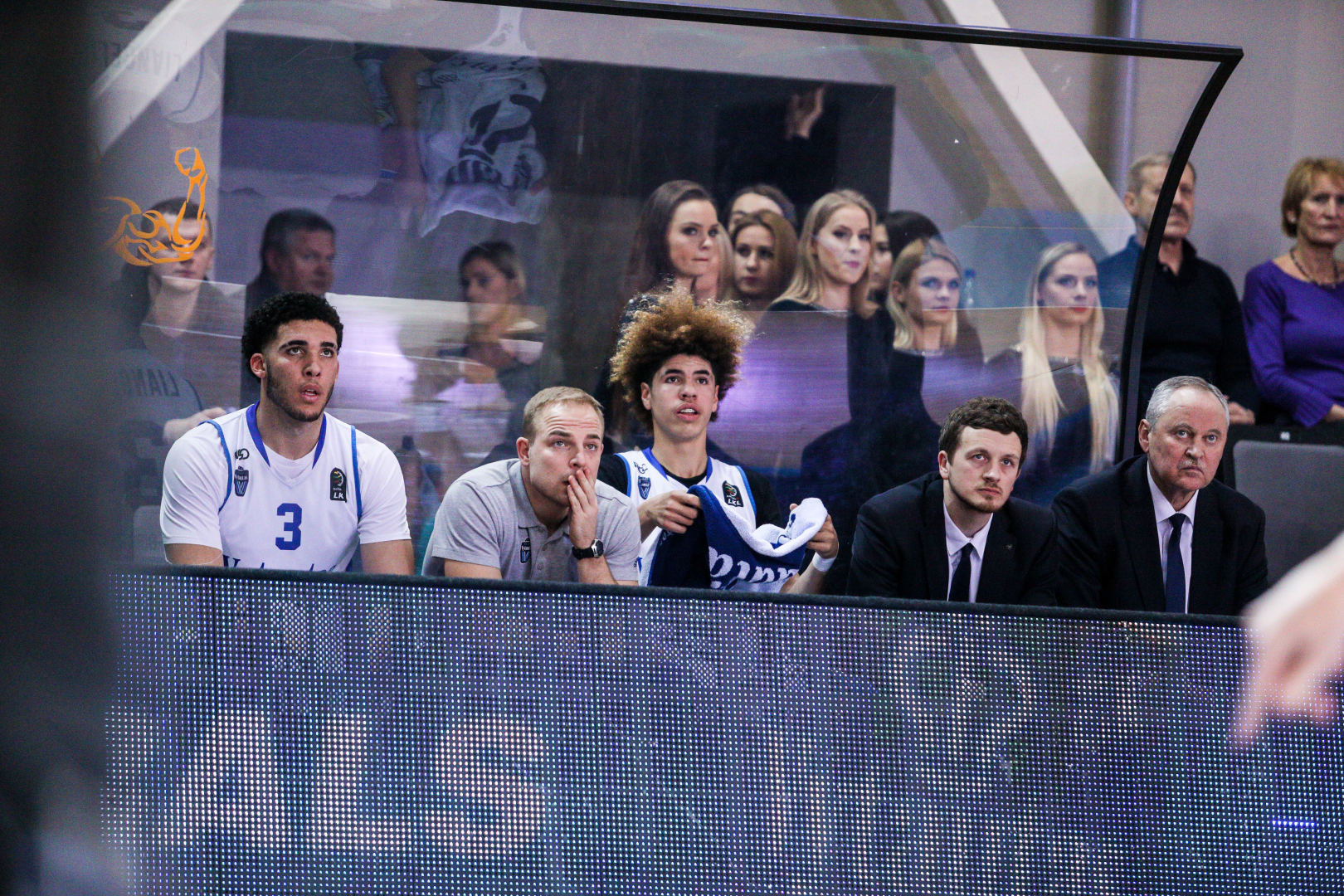
Lamelo and LiAngelo Ball during BC Vytautas game.

During the 2017-18 season, BC Vytautas signed LiAngelo and LaMelo, brothers of National Basketball Association (NBA) player Lonzo Ball. Leonavičius and the BC Vytautas team since then was part of the Ball in the Family reality show featuring LaVar Ball, the worldwide known media personality and businessman. During the 2020 NBA draft LaMelo Ball was selected with the 3rd overall pick by the Charlotte Hornets.

At the start of the 2021-22 season, after serving as an assistant coach for 7 seasons, Leonavičius was signed as the head coach for the Labas Gas.

During the 2021-22 season, the Labas Gas competed in King Mindaugas Cup and won 4 games out of 8, however, it was not enough to qualify to the next stage of the competition. In the Lithuanian Basketball League the team started the season with a 0-10 record and in late November the club management decided to make a coaching change, offering Leonavičius the opportunity to stay on as an assistant coach. However, after declining the offer he decided to leave the club.

=== JL Bourg ===
For the 2022-23 season, he signed with the French powerhouse JL Bourg to serve as the head coach of the club's youth U18 program and as an assistant coach of the U21 team.

At the beginning of April, he left France to join BC Wolves of the Lithuanian basketball league.

=== BC Wolves ===
At the end of the 2022-23 season, Leonavicius returned to Lithuania to join the BC Wolves staff as an assistant coach, upon the invitation of legendary Lithuanian basketball coach Kestutis Kemzura. The club finished 3rd in the regular season of the Lithuanian basketball league but failed to advance to the semifinals. In the Northern European Basketball League, they lost in the finals and finished 2nd.

The 2023-24 season was relatively better, with the club again finishing 3rd in the regular season and advancing to the semifinals. However, they ultimately lost to the future champions BC Rytas 2-3, finishing 4th in the final standings. The club also had its first season playing in the EuroCup, but their 8-10 regular season record was not enough to qualify for the playoffs.

The 2024–25 season began with a coaching change, as Italian coach Alessandro Magro took over the team. In their second EuroCup campaign, the club improved its regular season record to 10–8 and, for the first time in its history, qualified for the playoffs. However, they were eliminated in the first round. Domestically, the team reached the Final Four of the King Mindaugas Cup (KMT) but finished fourth after losses in both the semifinal and the third-place game. In the Lithuanian Basketball League, the Wolves ended the regular season in fourth place but once again failed to advance to the semifinals.

=== Return to JL Bourg ===
At the beginning of the 2025–26 season, Leonavicius returned to JL Bourg for his second stint in France, following the discontinuation of the BC Wolves project after the club’s funding was abruptly cut by its owner.

In his first season back, the team won the EuroCup, delivering a historic achievement for the club on the European stage.

=== Lithuanian youth national teams ===
Leonavicius served as an assistant coach for several Lithuanian youth national teams in various competitions, including the FIBA U18 Men's European Championship in 2022, the FIBA U16 Women's European Championship in 2023, the FIBA U17 Men's World Cup in 2024, and the 2025 FIBA U18 EuroBasket.
