= Skycop =

Claims management company

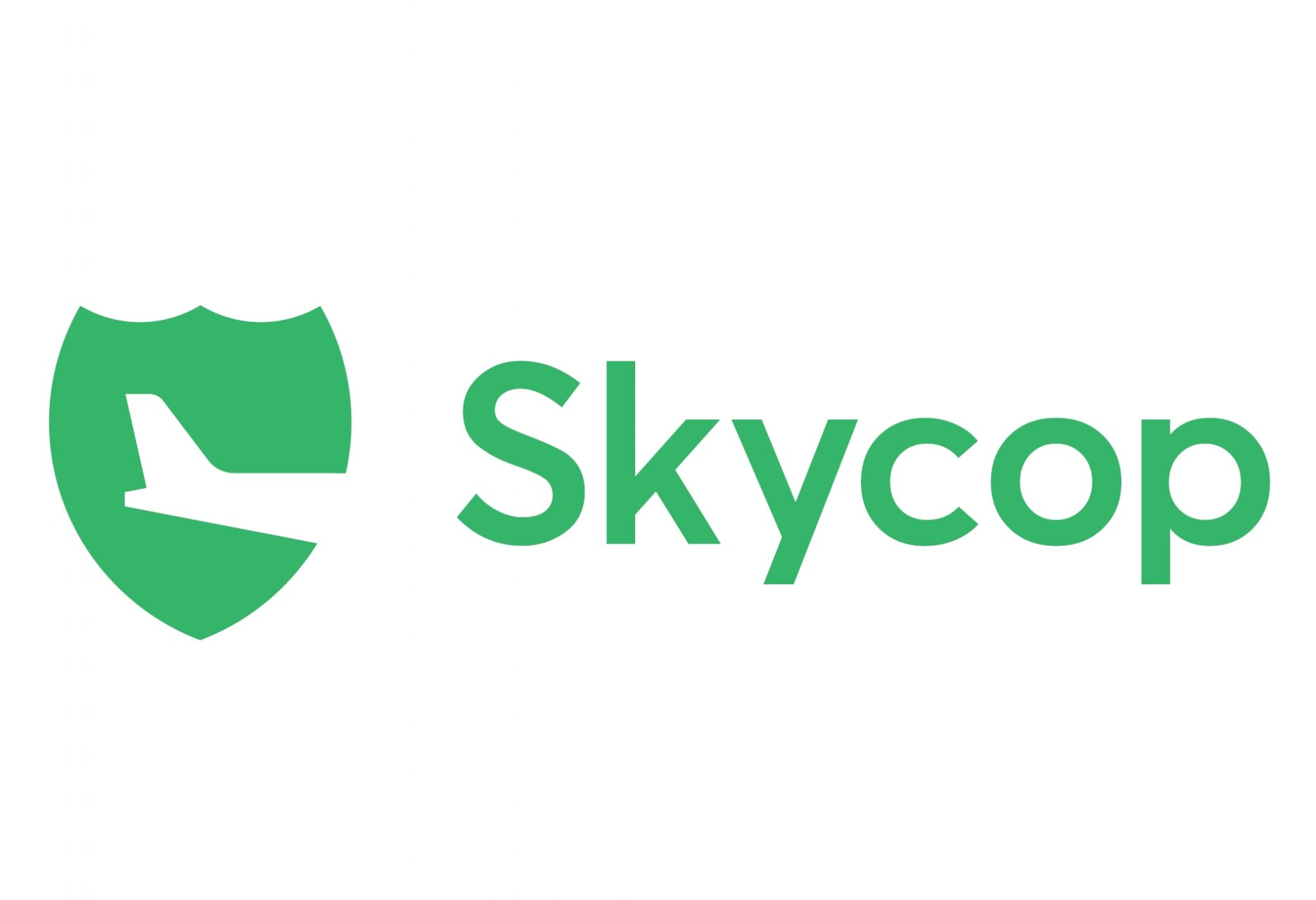
- Type: Private
- Industry: Claims management, aviation
- Founders: Šarūnas Straševičius
- Headquarters: Vilnius, Lithuania
- Key people: Tomas Vaišvila (CEO)
- Number of employees: 40
- Website: https://www.skycop.com

Skycop is a claims management company founded in Vilnius in 2017 and operating in European markets. It focuses on air travel. Skycop's business model is based on free claim management and a fixed fee if a compensation for delayed, canceled or overbooked flight is successful.

Skycop operates on a no-win, no-fee basis. For successful claims resolved without legal proceedings, it charges €110 from a €250 compensation payment, €176 from €400, and €264 from €600, equivalent to 44% including VAT. If legal proceedings are initiated, the fee increases to €125, €200, and €300 respectively, equivalent to 50%. A 2026 review described Skycop as one of the more expensive mainstream flight compensation providers.

== History ==
Skycop was launched in early 2017 in Vilnius, Lithuania.

In 2017, Skycop partnered with the Prienai basketball club competing in the Lithuanian Basketball League, and became its title sponsor in 2018. The season was noted for signing LiAngelo and LaMelo Ball, the younger brothers of then Los Angeles Lakers player Lonzo Ball, bringing international attention to the team.

In 2019, Skycop launched a campaign in Barcelona subway stations and busses with slogans "You don't love customers" against Spain's Vueling airline. The campaign was based on Vueling's slogan "We love places".

In 2022, Skycop was acquired by Tomas Vaišvila, the former CEO of Vilnius International Airport and a long-time employee at the Avia Solutions Group.

== Services ==
Skycop seeks claims for delayed, canceled and overbooked flights, as well as extra expenses claims, on behalf of passengers.

The company also offers the 'Skycop Care' subscription scheme with a 0% success fee, as well as B2B services for Online Travel Agencies, car rental companies and other businesses.

== See also ==
- Air Passengers Rights Regulation
- Claims management
- Flight cancellation and delay
