= Povilas Butkevičius =

Lithuanian basketball player (born 1987)

Personal information
- Born: September 26, 1987 (age 39) Biržai, Lithuanian SSR, Soviet Union
- Listed height: 6 ft 8 in (2.03 m)
- Listed weight: 233 lb (106 kg)

Career information
- NBA draft: 2008: undrafted
- Playing career: 2004–2017
- Position: Power forward / center

Career history
- 2004–2012: Žalgiris Kaunas
- 2004-2006: →Žalgiris-Arvydas Sabonis school
- 2006–2007: →Tartu Ülikool/Rock
- 2007-2008: →Nevėžis Kedainiai
- 2008–2009: →Triobet Kaunas
- 2010–2012: →Rūdupis Prienai
- 2012–2013: Novipiù Casale Monferrato
- 2013–2014: Nevėžis Kedainiai
- 2014–2015: Novipiù Casale Monferrato
- 2015–2016: Vytautas Prienai-Birštonas
- 2016-2017: BC Vytis

Povilas Butkevičius (born 26 September 1987) is a Lithuanian former professional basketball player.

== Professional career ==
From 2004-2005, till 2011-2012, he was part of the prominent Lithuanian team Žalgiris Kaunas.

In August 2010 and again in August 2011, he was loaned to BC Prienai for the season.

In July 2014 he signed a contract with the Italian team Novipiù Casale Monferrato.

In July 2015 he returned to Lithuania to play for Vytautas Prienai-Birštonas.

In September 2016 Butkevičius signed with BC Vytis. He played only 16 games due a shoulder injury, averaging 5.4 points and 5.6 rebounds. That season, the team won bronze medals in the NKL. On 20 May he announced his retirement from basketball because of injuries, despite being only 29 years old.

== National team career ==
Butkevičius was a team leader in 2007 for the Lithuanian U-20 national team. He was the top rebounder in the 2007 FIBA Europe Under-20 Championship.

== Achievements ==
- Estonian Basketball League Champion (2007)
- Baltic Basketball League Challenge Cup Champion (2008)
- LSKL Champion (2009)
- Baltic Basketball League Second Place (2009)
- Lithuanian Basketball League Second Place (2009)
- Baltic Basketball League Champion (2010)
- Lithuanian Basketball League Second Place (2010)
- Lithuanian Basketball League Third Place (2011, 2012)
- National Basketball League Third Place (2017)
