= Jock Landale =

Australian basketball player (born 1995)

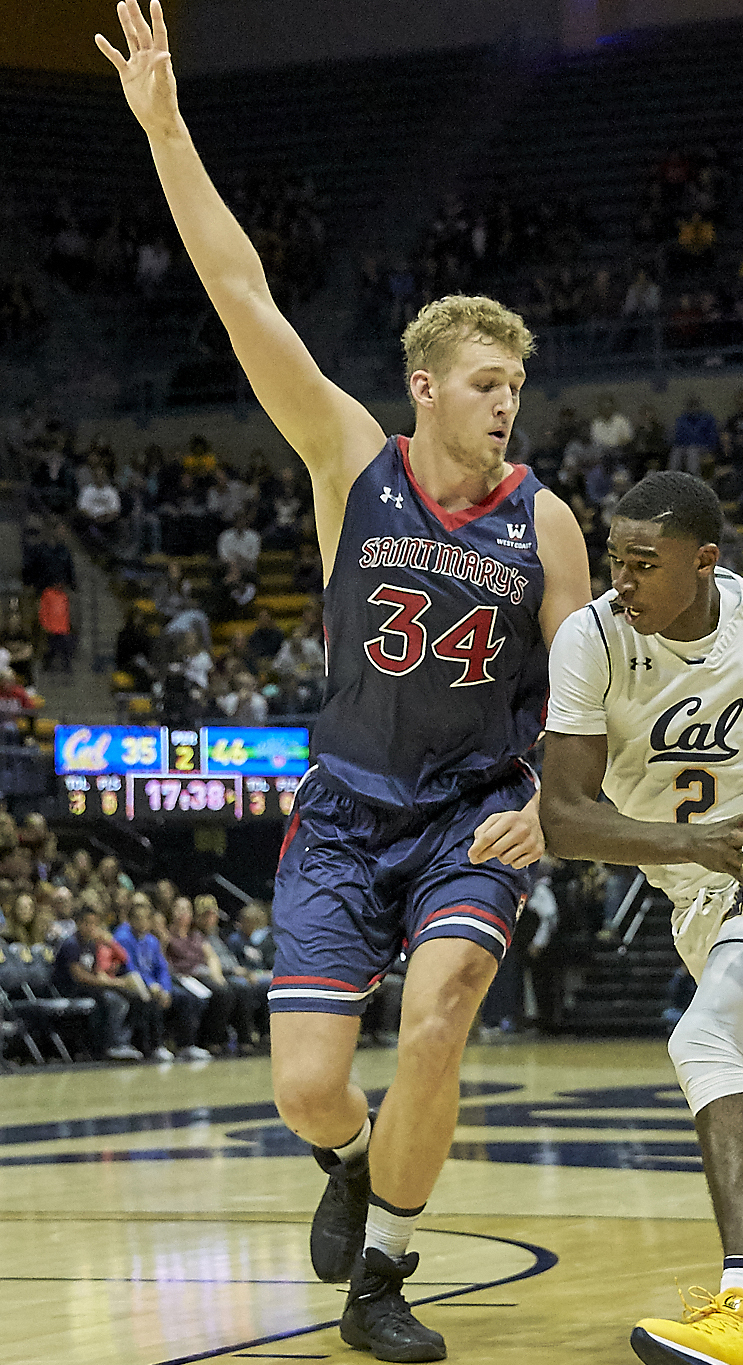
- Landale with Saint Mary's in 2017

No. 31 – Atlanta Hawks
- Position: Center
- League: NBA

Personal information
- Born: 25 October 1995 (age 31) Melbourne, Victoria, Australia
- Listed height: 6 ft 11 in (2.11 m)
- Listed weight: 255 lb (116 kg)

Career information
- High school: Geelong Grammar School (Corio, Victoria)
- College: Saint Mary's (2014–2018)
- NBA draft: 2018: undrafted
- Playing career: 2018–present

Career history
- 2018–2019: Partizan
- 2019–2020: Žalgiris
- 2020–2021: Melbourne United
- 2021–2022: San Antonio Spurs
- 2021: →Austin Spurs
- 2022–2023: Phoenix Suns
- 2023–2025: Houston Rockets
- 2025–2026: Memphis Grizzlies
- 2026–present: Atlanta Hawks

Career highlights
- NBL champion (2021); NBL Grand Final MVP (2021); All-NBL First Team (2021); Lithuanian League champion (2020); Lithuanian Cup winner (2020); Serbian Cup winner (2019); All-ABA League Team (2019); Consensus second-team All-American (2018); WCC Player of the Year (2018); 2× First-team All-WCC (2017, 2018); AP Honorable Mention All-American (2017); No. 34 retired by Saint Mary's Gaels
- Stats at NBA.com
- Stats at Basketball Reference
Medals
Men's basketball
Representing Australia
Olympic Games
Bronze medal – third place	2020 Tokyo	Team

Jock Landale (born 25 October 1995) is an Australian professional basketball player for the Atlanta Hawks of the National Basketball Association (NBA). He played college basketball for the Saint Mary's Gaels. Landale also represents the Australian national team. He was part of the Australian team that won bronze at the 2020 Tokyo Olympics.

== Early life ==
Landale was an early basketball prospect in Australia, but gave up the game until picking it up again at Geelong Grammar School in Corio, Victoria. A growth spurt that led to increase of almost a full foot from year 9 to year 12 raised his profile as a prospect and helped him secure a scholarship to Saint Mary's College, an American NCAA Division I school.

== College career ==
Landale was a bench player as a freshman, but increased his role as a sophomore and enjoyed a breakout season as a junior, in part due to improved conditioning. At times, Landale had dominant performances, such as the 5 January 2017 win over BYU in which he went 11-13 from the field for 26 points. He averaged 16.9 points and 9.5 rebounds, leading the Gaels to the 2017 NCAA tournament. His numbers became more impressive when only one of the 351 Division I men's teams averaged fewer possessions per game than the Gaels that season. At the close of the season, he was named first-team All-West Coast Conference (WCC).

Landale scored 33 points and grabbed 12 rebounds in an overtime loss to Georgia on 26 November. On 22 January 2018, Landale was named NBC Sports player of the week, after contributing 24 points and 12 rebounds in a win versus Gonzaga and 32 points and seven rebounds in a victory over Pacific. He averaged 21.5 points, 10.2 rebounds and 1.1 blocked shots per game as a senior. Landale was named West Coast Conference player of the year while his teammate Emmett Naar was named to the First Team All-Conference.

== Professional career ==
=== Partizan (2018–2019) ===
After going undrafted in the 2018 NBA draft, Landale signed with the Atlanta Hawks for NBA Summer League. He signed a two-year deal with Partizan of the ABA League on 31 July 2018. Over 24 ABA League games, Landale averaged 12 points and 5.6 rebounds, while shooting 56.6% from the field. For his performances, he was named to the 2018–19 ABA League Ideal Starting Five.

=== Žalgiris Kaunas (2019–2020) ===
On 20 May 2019, Landale signed a 1+1 season deal with the Lithuanian champions Žalgiris Kaunas. Landale played for the Milwaukee Bucks in 2019 Las Vegas Summer League. In a game against Real Madrid in January 2020, Landale donated $100 for every three-pointer and dunk to help fight the Australian bushfires. Landale averaged 11.0 points, 4.4 rebounds and 1.0 assist per game. He parted ways with the team on 3 August 2020.

=== Melbourne United (2020–2021) ===
On 10 December 2020, Landale signed one-year deal with Melbourne United for the 2020–21 NBL season. Landale led the United into the 2021 NBL Grand Final against the defending champions, the Perth Wildcats. In Game 1, he posted 17 points, seven rebounds, three assists, two steals and two blocks in a 73–70 win. Landale helped the team take a 2–0 series lead after logging a double-double with 12 points and 17 rebounds. In Game 3, he registered a game-high 15 points, nine rebounds, two assists, two steals and two blocks in an 81–76 victory. After leading the United to a 3–0 sweep in the best-of-five series, Landale won the NBL Grand Final MVP Award. He finished the season averaging 16.4 points, 7.8 rebounds, 2.3 assists and 1.4 blocks per game and was awarded the Melbourne United MVP.

=== San Antonio Spurs (2021–2022) ===
On 20 August 2021, Landale signed with the San Antonio Spurs. On 12 March 2022, he scored a season-high 26 points in a 119–108 loss to the Indiana Pacers.

=== Phoenix Suns (2022–2023) ===
On June 30, 2022, Landale was traded, alongside Dejounte Murray, to the Atlanta Hawks in exchange for Danilo Gallinari and multiple future first-round picks.

Less than a week later, on July 6, he was traded to the Phoenix Suns in exchange for cash considerations. With the Suns in the 2022–23 season, he scored a season-high 17 points three times.

=== Houston Rockets (2023–2025) ===
On July 6, 2023, Landale signed a four-year, $32 million contract with the Houston Rockets. He made 56 appearances (including three starts) for Houston during the 2023–24 NBA season, averaging 4.9 points, 3.1 rebounds, and 1.2 assists.

Landale made 42 appearances (three starts) for Houston in the 2024–25 NBA season, logging averages of 4.8 points, 3.3 rebounds, and 0.9 assists. On July 3, 2025, Landale was waived by the Rockets.

=== Memphis Grizzlies (2025–2026) ===
On July 15, 2025, Landale signed with the Memphis Grizzlies. Landale made 45 appearances (including 25 starts) for Memphis during the 2025–26 NBA season, averaging 11.3 points, 6.5 rebounds, and 1.7 assists.

=== Atlanta Hawks (2026–present) ===
On February 3, 2026, Landale, Jaren Jackson Jr., John Konchar and Vince Williams Jr. were traded to the Utah Jazz in exchange for Kyle Anderson, Walter Clayton Jr., Taylor Hendricks, Georges Niang, and three first-round draft picks. On February 5, Landale was traded to the Atlanta Hawks in exchange for cash considerations. He made his debut with the Hawks that night, tying his career–high with 26 points alongside 11 rebounds and a career-high five 3-pointers in a 121–119 win over the Utah Jazz. Landale played in 23 games (including two starts) for Atlanta, averaging 9.1 points, 4.1 rebounds, and 1.7 assists.

On June 30, 2026, Landale re-signed with Atlanta on a one-year, $14 million contract.

== Career statistics ==
Legend
GP	Games played	GS	Games started	MPG	Minutes per game
FG%	Field-goal percentage	3P%	3-point field-goal percentage	FT%	Free-throw percentage
RPG	Rebounds per game	APG	Assists per game	SPG	Steals per game
BPG	Blocks per game	PPG	Points per game	PIR	Performance index rating
**Bold**	Career high

=== NBA ===
==== Regular season ====
Year	Team	GP	GS	MPG	FG%	3P%	FT%	RPG	APG	SPG	BPG	PPG
2021–22	San Antonio	54	1	10.9	.495	.326	**.829**	2.6	.8	.2	.3	4.9
2022–23	Phoenix	**69**	4	14.2	.528	.250	.752	4.1	1.0	.2	.4	**6.6**
2023–24	Houston	56	3	13.6	.515	.250	.800	3.1	1.2	.4	**.6**	4.9
2024–25	Houston	42	3	11.9	**.533**	**.423**	.675	3.3	.9	.3	.2	4.8
2025–26	Memphis	45	**25**	**23.6**	.514	.380	.674	**6.5**	**1.7**	**.6**	.5	**11.3**
2025–26	Atlanta	23	2	19.4	.516	.391	.541	4.1	**1.7**	.4	**.6**	9.1
Career		289	38	15.0	.517	.336	.721	3.9	1.1	.3	.4	6.6

==== Playoffs ====
Year	Team	GP	GS	MPG	FG%	3P%	FT%	RPG	APG	SPG	BPG	PPG
2023	Phoenix	**7**	**1**	**16.2**	**.630**	.000	**.643**	**4.0**	**.4**	**.4**	**.4**	**6.1**
2025	Houston	1	0	5.0	.500	—	—	.0	.0	.0	.0	2.0
Career		8	1	14.8	.621	.000	.643	3.5	.4	.4	.4	5.6

=== NBL ===
Year	Team	GP	GS	MPG	FG%	3P%	FT%	RPG	APG	SPG	BPG	PPG
2020–21	Melbourne	41	40	27.5	.544	.389	.712	7.9	2.4	.6	1.5	16.4

=== EuroLeague ===
Year	Team	GP	GS	MPG	FG%	3P%	FT%	RPG	APG	SPG	BPG	PPG	PIR
2019–20	Žalgiris	25	19	20.3	.646	.302	.821	4.4	1.0	.5	.4	11.0	10.4

=== EuroCup ===
Year	Team	GP	GS	MPG	FG%	3P%	FT%	RPG	APG	SPG	BPG	PPG	PIR
2018–19	Partizan	16	12	25.1	.683	.381	.481	6.5	1.8	.5	.7	11.2	15.1

=== College ===
Year	Team	GP	GS	MPG	FG%	3P%	FT%	RPG	APG	SPG	BPG	PPG
2014-15	Saint Mary's	21	0	5.0	.613	—	.538	.9	.1	.0	.2	2.1
2015-16	Saint Mary's	35	1	14.5	.613	**1.000**	**.775**	3.9	.6	.3	.3	7.9
2016-17	Saint Mary's	34	34	28.3	.611	.222	.722	9.5	1.7	.3	**1.2**	16.9
2017-18	Saint Mary's	**36**	**36**	**33.3**	**.640**	.300	.746	**10.2**	**2.0**	**.4**	1.0	**21.1**
Career		126	71	22.0	.625	.276	.738	6.7	1.2	.3	.7	13.2

== See also ==
- List of foreign basketball players in Serbia
