= Mantas Šernius =

Lithuanian basketball coach (born 1983)

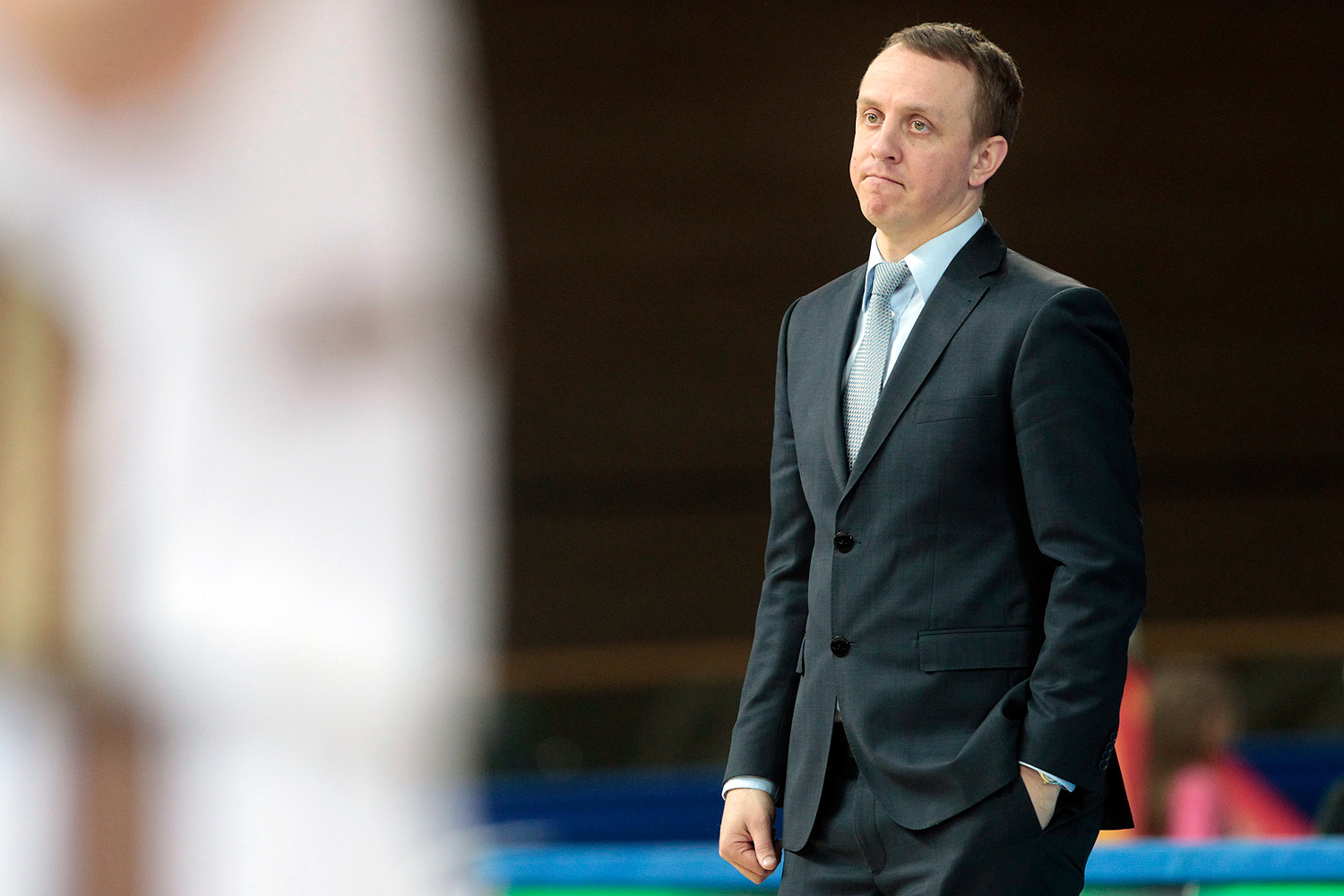
- Šernius in 2015

Žalgiris Kaunas
- Position: Assistant coach
- League: LKL; EuroLeague

Personal information
- Born: 29 June 1983 (age 43) Šilutė, Lithuania
- Coaching career: 2008–present

Career history

Coaching
- 2008–2009: BC Šiauliai (assistant)
- 2009–2010: TEO Vilnius (assistant)
- 2010: TEO Vilnius
- 2010–2012: VIČI-Aistės Kaunas
- 2013–2014: Pieno žvaigždės Pasvalys (assistant)
- 2014–2016: Pieno žvaigždės Pasvalys
- 2016–2018: Shanxi Flame
- 2018–2019: BC Žalgiris-2
- 2019–2021: CBet Prienai
- 2021–2022: Pieno žvaigždės
- 2022–2024: Prometey (assistant)
- 2024–2025: CBet Jonava
- 2024–2025: Lithuania (assistant)
- 2025–present: Žalgiris Kaunas (assistant)

Career highlights
- As head coach: 2× Lithuanian League Coach of the Year (2021, 2025); As assistant coach: Latvian-Estonian Basketball League champion (2023)

Mantas Šernius
Personal information
- Position: Forward

Senior career*
Years	Team	Apps	(Gls)
1999–2002	FK Šilutė		(18)
2002	FK Inkaras Kaunas	27	(7)
2003–2004	FK Atlantas	47	(7)
2003	→ FK Atlantas-2 (loan)		(3)
- * Club domestic league appearances and goals

Mantas Šernius (born 29 June 1983) is a Lithuanian professional basketball coach who is currently an assistant coach for Žalgiris Kaunas of the Lithuanian Basketball League (LKL) and the EuroLeague. He was also an assistant coach of the Lithuania national team.

== Coaching career ==
On 1 July 2022, Šernius signed as an assistant coach with Ukrainian club Prometey, working under head coach Ronen Ginzburg. He re-signed with the team on 16 May 2023.

On 15 July 2024, Šernius was named as the head coach of CBet Jonava of the Lithuanian Basketball League (LKL).

On 28 June 2025, Šernius was named as an assistant coach for Žalgiris Kaunas of the Lithuanian Basketball League (LKL) and the EuroLeague.
