= Dominykas Domarkas =

Lithuanian basketball player (born 1992)

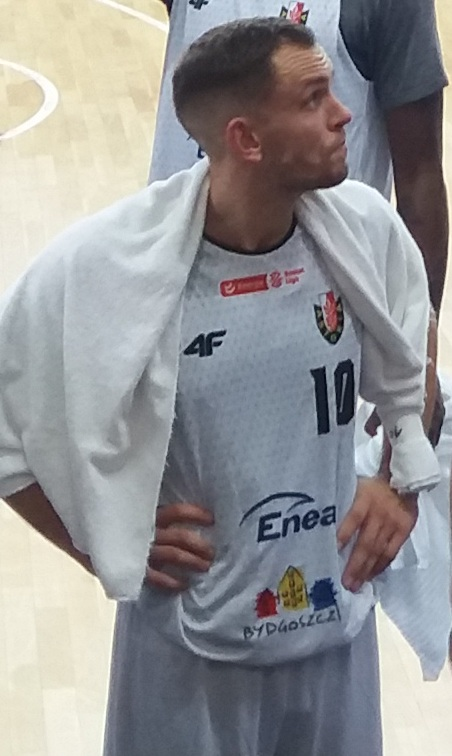

Personal information
- Born: 24 April 1992 (age 34) Kaunas, Lithuania
- Listed height: 1.92 m (6 ft 4 in)
- Listed weight: 87 kg (192 lb)

Career information
- Playing career: 2010–2025
- Position: Point guard

Career history
- 2010–2011: LKKA-Atletas
- 2011–2015: Perlas-MRU
- 2015–2016: Vytis
- 2016–2017: Sūduva-Mantinga
- 2017–2018: Dzūkija
- 2018: BK Jēkabpils
- 2018–2019: Dzūkija
- 2019–2020: Pieno žvaigždės Pasvalys
- 2020–2021: CBet Prienai
- 2021: Astoria Bydgoszcz
- 2021–2022: Ternopil
- 2022–2023: Hermine Nantes Basket
- 2023: Labas-Gas Prienai
- 2023-2024: BC Sudūva-Mantinga
- 2024-2025: BC Omega-Tauras-LSU

Dominykas Domarkas (born April 24, 1992) is a Lithuanian former professional basketball player.

== Professional career ==
Domarkas began his career with the National Basketball League (NKL) in Kaunas LKKA-Atletas. In 2015 he signed with Vytis.

On June 5, 2020, he has signed with Prienai of the Lithuanian Basketball League.

On May 26, 2021, he has signed with Astoria Bydgoszcz of the PLK.

Domarkas joined Ternopil in 2021, and averaged 10.6 points, 3.8 assists and 2.7 rebounds per game. On March 3, 2022, he has signed with Hermine Nantes Basket of the Pro B.
