= BC Prienai =

Basketball team in Lithuania

Prienai
- Founded: 1994
- Dissolved: 2023
- History: Prienų Bankas (1994–1999); Prienai (1999–2007, 2012–2013, 2014–2015); Rūdupis (2007–2012); TonyBet (2013–2014); Vytautas (2015–2018); Skycop (2018–2019); CBet (2019–2021); Labas GAS (2021–2023)
- Arena: Prienai Arena
- Capacity: 1,500
- Location: Prienai, Lithuania
- Team colors: Blue, red, white
- Championships: 1 Baltic League; 1 NKL champions 2 LKF Cups
- Website: bcprienai.lt
Home	Away

BC Prienai (Lithuanian: Krepšinio klubas Prienai) was a Lithuanian professional basketball club based in Prienai. They played domestically in the Lithuanian Basketball League every year since winning the promotion in 2009. During the 2008–09 season, then called Rūdupis, they became the champion of the NKL and won the challenge match for a slot in the LKL. In their debut LKL season Rūdupis took seventh place, while next two seasons brought BC Prienai two bronze LKL medals. BC Prienai played in EuroCup 2011–12 with moderate success; the team won 3 games out of 6, but nonetheless failed to qualify for the next stage. More recently, the team has become a strong competitor in domestic tournaments, more than once upsetting teams such as Žalgiris Kaunas and Lietuvos rytas Vilnius. In December 2017, in a highly publicized move, Vytautas signed American basketball players and brothers LaMelo and LiAngelo Ball.

In July 2023, the club declared bankruptcy and ceased all operations.

== History ==
=== 1994–2010: Early years ===
The club was founded in 1994 as KK Prienų Taupomasis Bankas playing in the LKAL and were one of the top teams. They joined the NKL ever since its foundation in 2005. During this time period in the NKL, the team would change names as it seemed every season, Prienai had their ups and downs, such as going from third seed in their group to not making the playoffs next season, but the major victories were yet to come.

During 2008–09 season, then called Rūdupis, the club, for the first time in the club history, became NKL champions downing Meresta Pakruojis in Game 7 of the finals. Because of that, BC Rūdupis got their slot in the Lithuanian Basketball League.

The 2009–10 season was Rūdupis' debut in the LKL. The club took seventh place that season as they lost first round of LKL playoffs to Lithuanian powerhouse Žalgiris Kaunas.

=== 2010–2014: Turning heads ===
During the 2010–11 season, BC Rūdupis won the LKF Cup Bronze medals and was only one step away from gold or silver medals as they lost a thriller against the legendary Žalgiris Kaunas 73–75, but the surprises from BC Rūdupis in the 2010–11 season were not finished yet, as BC Rūdupis defeated Lithuanian Basketball League champions Lietuvos rytas Vilnius with result 96–82, during a LKL match at their home arena on 29 March 2011. On 15 April 2011, BC Rūdupis signed a contract with Rolandas Alijevas until the end of the season. In the LKL semi finals Rūdupis was not able to eliminate Lithuanian basketball powerhouse Lietuvos rytas Vilnius as they lost both matches (first match: 75–88, second match: 69–96). Rūdupis then played against Juventus in the LKL Bronze final, they won the first game at Prienai with a result of 79–65, then won the second game, this time on the road in Utena with a result 98–73. The third game took place in Prienai where Rūdupis won a thriller 84–83, thus winning the series 3–0 and becoming Lithuanian Basketball League bronze medalists for the first time in the club's history.

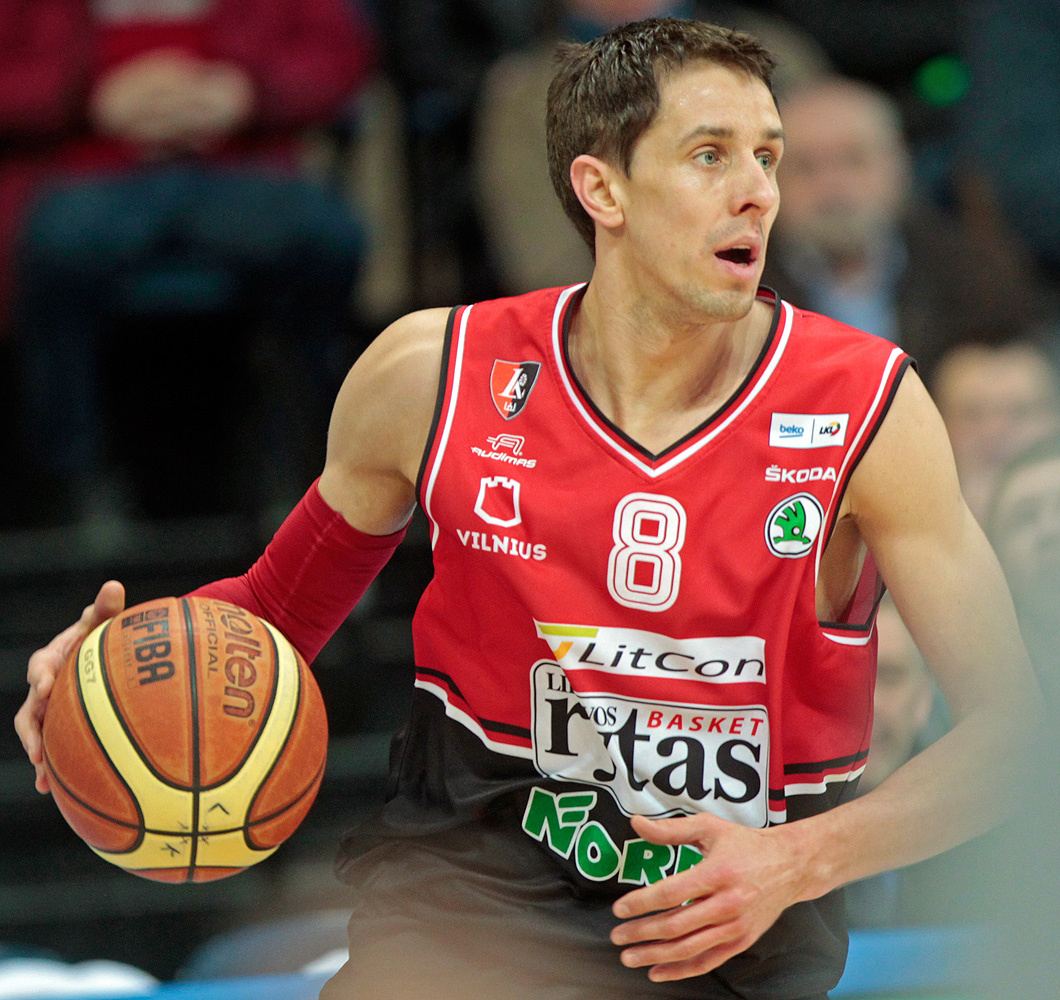
Mindaugas Lukauskis, leader of TonyBet Prienai for the 2013–14 season

In 2011–12 season, the team played in the EuroCup competition, finishing 3rd in the group, though failing to qualify to the playoffs. They repeated as bronze medal winners, this time defeating Šiauliai 3–1.

The 2012–13 season was moderately successful for BC Prienai. The team played in the EuroCup, but again did not move past the group stage. The team also reached the BBL finals, and won the LKF Cup against Pieno žvaigždės Pasvalys. Despite home court advantage, Prienai lost to Neptūnas Klaipėda in the bronze medal series.

In the 2013–14 season, Lithuanian businessman Antanas Guoga sponsored the newly renamed BC TonyBet, the team once again won the LKF Cup when they pulled off a double upset, defeating Lietuvos rytas Vilnius in the finals after upsetting Žalgiris Kaunas in the semifinal. Prienai finished second in the LKL regular season, which even included a blowout win against Žalgiris Kaunas 101–83 at home. BC TonyBet made it to the semifinals for the fourth consecutive year, this time with a chance to qualify to the LKL finals for the first time ever, but lost the series 0–2 to Neptūnas Klaipėda. In the bronze medal series, the team lost to Lietuvos rytas. Apart from the disappointing finish, it was one of the most successful seasons in club history.

=== 2014–2023: Setbacks, debts and bankruptcy ===
The 2014–15 season was more of a write-off, as it started a rebuilding phase for the team. The team, having lost their main sponsor, longtime coach and much of the previous season's roster, played poorly. The team barely avoided relegation in the LKL, with a 23-game losing streak plummeting the team to the bottom of the standings. The team played better in the BBL, reaching the playoffs. Because of poor play, the team failed to qualify for the LKF Cup, losing it to Žalgiris Kaunas after their successful previous two seasons.

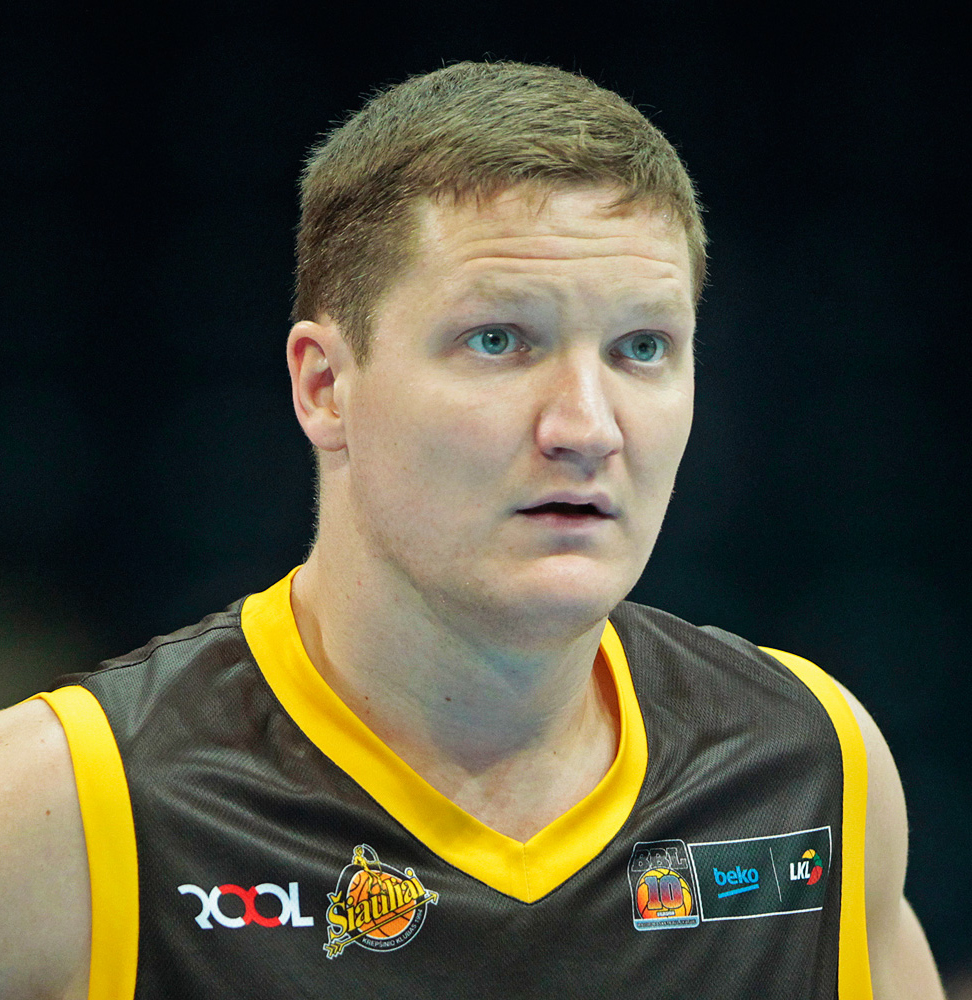
Vytautas Šulskis joined Vytautas Prienai-Birštonas in 2015.

In the 2015 off-season, BC Prienai announced a sponsorship deal with Birštonas mineral water company, will be changing their name to BC Birštono Vytautas for sponsorship reasons. Having proper sponsorship, the club hopes to return to their competitive ways in the upcoming season. It was later corrected that the name will be BC Vytautas and that the club is going to be shared with the neighboring city of Birštonas, which hopefully would also expand the fanbase. Furthermore, on 29 July 2015, the club was invited to join the 2015–16 FIBA Europe Cup tournament, which is the alternative version of the 2nd tier European tournament EuroCup, organized by FIBA. Although, just before the drawing ceremony, it was announced that 56 teams will participate instead of 64 and Vytautas is not one of these 56. In this off-season BC Vytautas brought back former players Povilas Butkevičius, Vaidas Čepukaitis and Laimonas Kisielius, also resigning Prienai natives Domantas Šeškus, Paulius Ivanauskas and bringing in major reinforcement with Šarūnas Vasiliauskas, Vilmantas Dilys, Vytautas Šulskis, Gytis Sirutavičius. On 16 September 2015, Prienai announced their new logo and color change to blue and white as part of the sponsorship deal, though blue has been a traditional sports team color in the Prienai–Birštonas area.

On 30 December 2015, Prienai native Edvinas Šeškus was cleared to play for Vytautas, joining his father the head coach and his older brother Domantas. Because of injuries ruining the rotation, on 26 February 2016, Vytautas signed Tauras Jogėla. In the BBL playoffs, they lost to Nevėžis Kėdainiai in an upset. Vytautas finished the LKL regular season with a 19–17 record, but lost 2–3 in the quarterfinals to Juventus Utena.

Before the 2016–17 season, the team signed longtime Lithuanian national team player Tomas Delininkaitis. In addition to the LKL, the team also played in the FIBA Europe Cup. They easily finished 1st in the regular season group, defeating Mureș and TLÜ/Kalev Tallinn. In the second round, the team finished second, losing only to Telekom Baskets Bonn. The loss at home, however, cost the team a place in the playoffs. BC Vytautas then entered the BBL playoffs, as one of the potential favorites to win. They easily defeated Pärnu in the first round, before defeating Latvian champions Valmiera in the quarterfinals and Estonian champions Kalev/Cramo Tallinn in the semifinals. In the finals, Vytautas faced LKL rival Pieno žvaigždės Pasvalys. After losing the first game at home 85–88, they won the away game 89–74, winning the series 174–162 on aggregate, and winning their first BBL championship. Injuries started hurting the team, and in the quarterfinals Vytautas lost the series 0–3 to Lietkabelis Panevėžys.

==== The Ball brothers (2018) ====
Vytautas started the 2017–18 season poorly by failing to qualify for the 2017–18 Basketball Champions League season. The team was also performing poorly in the national competition by achieving only 4 victories out of 13 games in the 2017–18 LKL season. Consequently, the interest of fans to the team was rapidly decreasing every day. However, on 11 December 2017, with the help of 21 year old Communications Manager Erikas Kirvelaitis, the team signed LiAngelo and LaMelo Ball, the younger brothers of then Los Angeles Laker player Lonzo Ball, both of whom reportedly agreed to join the team in the beginning of January 2018. Team managers described it as instant success.

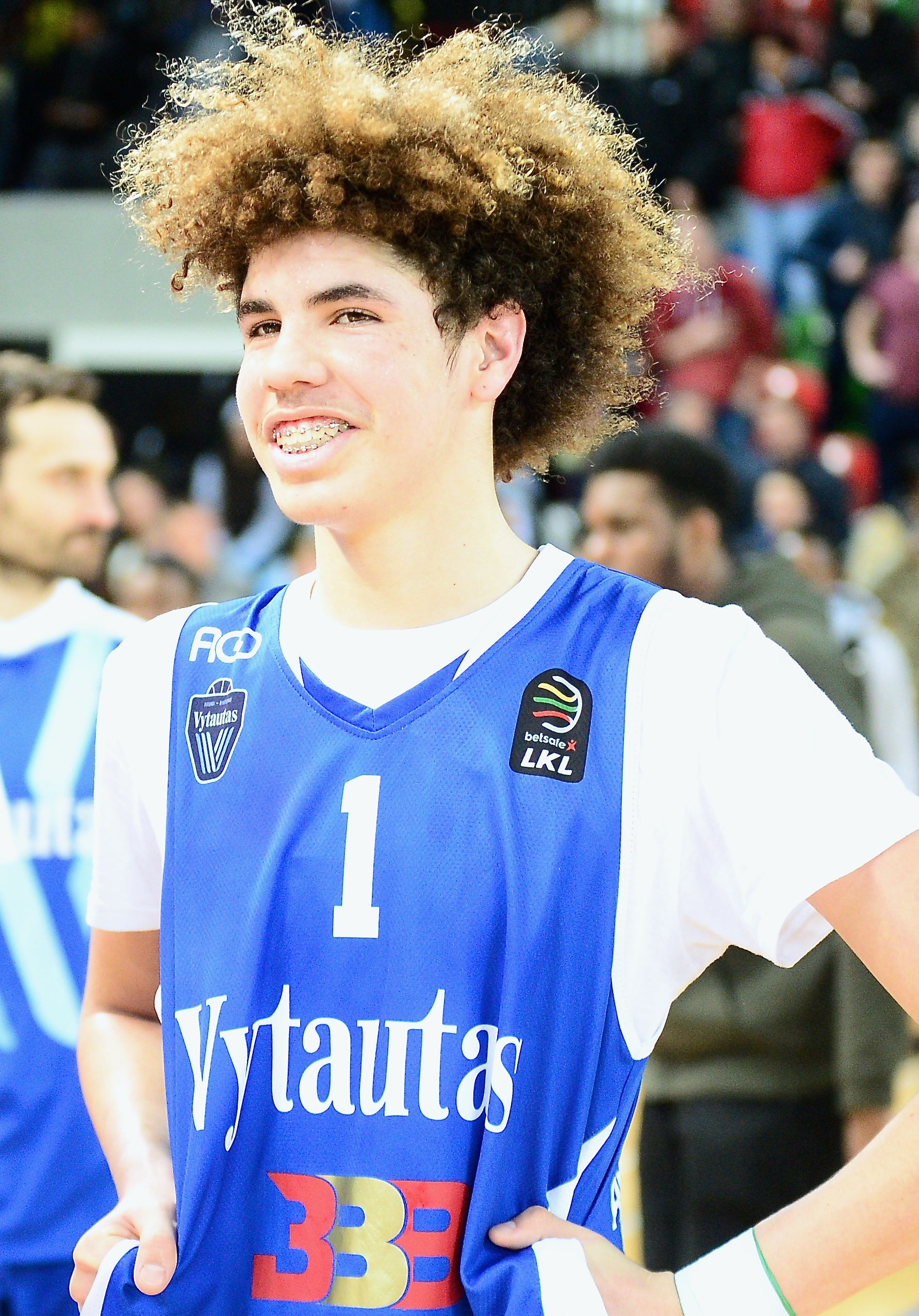
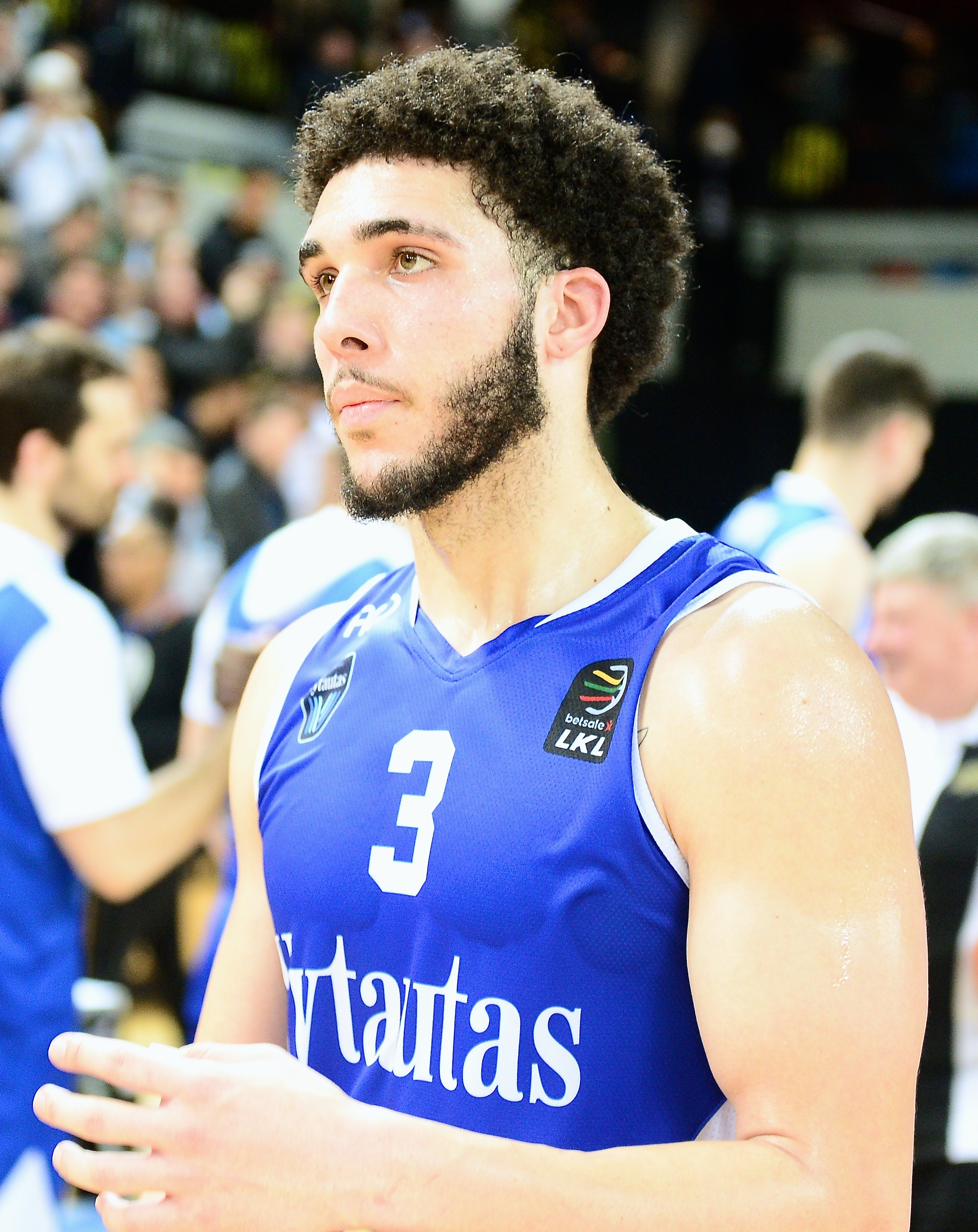
The signings of LaMelo (left) and LiAngelo Ball (right), who played together at Chino Hills High School, brought international attention to the team.

In early January 2018, Vytautas pulled out of the Baltic Basketball League season, instead hosting the newly formed Big Baller Brand Challenge Games to give the Ball brothers more playing time against weaker teams, most of which played in lower leagues. On 23 January 2018, the team announced that the Big Baller Brand was an official sponsor until the end of the season. The news would be announced with the company helping pay off the team's debts they accrued previously, which amounted to 100,000 Euros. On the same day, the team temporarily appointed LaVar Ball, owner of the brand and the famous father of the Ball brothers, as assistant coach for a match-up with Dzūkija Alytus in the Big Baller Brand Challenge Games. On January 28, for the team's concluding exhibition game against Jonava, Ball was named head coach. Vytautas won all five games. By the end of February, Vytautas announced that it would play in another exhibition event sponsored by Ball's company, known the Big Baller Brand International Tournament, a round-robin competition featuring three European teams outside of Lithuania. In those games, LaVar Ball would be the team's head coach there instead. This time, Vytautas lost all three games. Vytautas would also play exhibition games against the youth squad for the Chinese Guangdong Southern Tigers in Lithuania and the British London Lions in England on March 27 and April 2 respectively. Vytautas won both games, defeating the Tigers 157–113 with LiAngelo scoring 72 points, and defeated the Lions 127–110, with the Ball brothers scoring a combined 83 points. After some drastic changes made, mainly with LaMelo being sidelined near the end of the regular season and leader Tomas Dimša leaving the team, Vytautas would go on a three-game winning streak, thus helping them hopefully avoid relegation this season. However, after a 25 April loss to Šiauliai where neither of the Ball brothers played that day, their father LaVar announced that he would pull the two players from the team on 29 April and have them return to the United States, with the plan on helping LiAngelo try and acquire a spot in the 2018 NBA draft. Before leaving, LaVar praised the fans and the team, but criticized coach Šeškus.

A 66–77 loss to Neptūnas Klaipėda at home ended almost all hope of reaching the ninth place and avoiding potential relegation, and a 73–79 loss to rival Pieno žvaigždės Pasvalys meant that Vytautas would finish in the last place. Before the last game of the season the team released Kervin Bristol, Rashaun Broadus and one of the team's leaders Denys Lukashov. In the last game of the season, Vytautas suffered one of the most embarrassing losses in club history, to the reigning champions Žalgiris Kaunas, losing the game in Kaunas 52–109. On 13 June, the LKL announced that Vytautas would most likely not play in the league in the 2018–19 season due to relegation. However, on 17 July, the league announced that Vytautas would participate in the new season after Vytis Šakiai from the NKL did not meet the promotional requirements. A press statement from the team in August 2018 revealed that during their time with the club, the Ball family "started destroying the club" through means like not paying the prize money for the Big Baller Brand's tournament winners, withdrawing financial support, and taking back shooting machines that were presented to the team as gifts. However, despite no longer having Vytautas as a sponsor for the team, they look to survive by finding players with great discipline and personalities and giving priority to those professionals.

==== SkyCop (2018–2019) ====
In August, the team changed their name to BC SkyCop after their new sponsor, flight compensation group Skycop. No player remained from the previous season, with coach Šeškus building a new team for the upcoming season. The team signed away three of BC Lietkabelis players, the Lavrinovič twins, former members of the Lithuanian national basketball team and leaders of Lietkabelis, and Gintaras Leonavičius. Former member of SkyCop, longtime BC Rytas player Mindaugas Lukauskis signed in August, and signed solid power forward, Mike Bruesewitz, the leader of Latvian champions BK Ventspils. The team also signed small forward Austin Arians and Maverick Morgan, who had solid seasons in Ukraine and Poland. Davis Lejasmeiers and the returning Ovidijus Varanauskas were signed at the point guard position. The team also brought back Arnas Labuckas. Just before the season started, SkyCop signed former longtime BC Rytas player and 2-time Euroleague champion Martynas Gecevičius to a contract. In the first game of the season in the LKL, SkyCop faced BC Lietkabelis, one of the top teams, and won in dominating fashion 93–78. However, by the end of November, the team struggled in the LKL with a 4–8 record, and fighting for a place in the playoffs, leading to Arians, Morgan, Lejasmiers and Tyrone Nash being released from the team. While the additions of the returning Žygimantas Janavičius and newcomer Anthony Lee Jr. helped the team, more departures followed - team leader Bruesewitz left the team in January, followed by Varanauskas. By the middle of January, SkyCop was tied for 6th place in the LKL standings, with a 7–11 record. Former BC Nevėžis leader Malcolm Grant was signed at the end of January, while Lee Jr. was released during February. SkyCop rebounded around April, scoring wins and securing a place in the playoffs, and on April 30, SkyCop scored their biggest win by defeating BC Žalgiris 81:76 at home. SkyCop finished the regular season with a 13–23 record, but in 7th place. SkyCop faced Neptūnas - after getting blown away 78:102 in the first game, SkyCop rebounded with a surprising 94:85 win at home. In the decisive match, SkyCop fought hard, before falling 71:77 in Klaipėda, losing the series 1:2 and ending the season.

In the new format of the King Mindaugas Cup, SkyCop faced in the first round NKL team BC Vytis – the team that was supposed to take their place in the LKL. SkyCop eliminated Vytis on aggregate, 169:133, with two straight wins (78:54 away and 91:79 at home). In the second round, SkyCop faced BC Dzūkija – losing the first game at home, 83:84, SkyCop was down for much of the first half in the return game in Alytus – before a very strong second half led to a 79:68 win and a win on aggregate, 162:152. In the quarterfinals, now joined by Janavičius, SkyCop faced one of the heavy favorites, BC Neptūnas. SkyCop scored a tie 85:85 in the first game at home, and led for most of the returning game in Klaipėda, before a solid fourth quarter by Neptūnas led to an 89:80 victory, eliminating SkyCop by aggregate, 174:165.

==== CBet (2019–2021) ====
After losing to BC Neptūnas in May, coach Šeškus announced that he would not return as coach for the 2019–2020 season. Only Mindaugas Lukauskis, Ernestas Mankauskas and assistant coach Marius Leonavičius remained on the team from the previous season. Mantas Šernius was named the new head coach of the team. Arnas Velička was loaned by BC Žalgiris to get more playing time. Former players Gediminas Maceina, Vaidas Čepukaitis and Regimantas Miniotas returned to the team. CBet also signed Martynas Varnas, Lukas Uleckas and Karolis Guščikas. Skylar Spencer and Devon van Oostrum were briefly signed, and Tom Digbeu was also loaned by Žalgiris, but both left, with Digbeu not playing a single game for CBet. Kerr Kriisa was also briefly loaned by Žalgiris. CBet played in the King Mindaugas Cup, eliminating National Basketball League side BC Šilutė, but were eliminated by BC Šiauliai in the second round. For much of the season, the young CBet was successfully fighting for the 5-6th places in the LKL. In December, CBet signed Donatas Sabeckis and were loaned Laurynas Birutis by Žalgiris, a former duo who had much success in BC Šiauliai and briefly played together in Žalgiris. Birutis won the MVP in the LKL in the month of February, and also earned an invite for the Lithuanian national basketball team. After the season was ended early due to the coronavirus outbreak and subsequent pandemic, CBet finished the LKL season in 6th place - improvement over the previous season.

The 2020–2021 season was even better for CBet. CBet lost much of their previous season roster, and many of the best players left CBet during the season, like team leader Miniotas, who lead the team in much statistical categories and even was called up to the Lithuanian national basketball team, due to better contract offers or financial difficulties, under coach Šernius, CBet finished the season in 5th place, a surprise to many. Coach Šernius was named the LKL Coach of the Year. Many of the best players for CBet, like Mindaugas Sušinskas, Einaras Tubutis or the returning Tom Digbeu, also late season signings like Ignas Sargiūnas, returning from the NCAA, played the best seasons of their careers. CBet, even with all their problems, still gave the best fight they could give against a much stronger BC Juventus team in the LKL playoffs, losing the series 0–2.

==== Labas GAS (2021–2023) ====
During the summer, after losing their CBet sponsorship to BC Jonava, coached by long time former coach of Prienai, Virginijus Šeškus, having found a new sponsor, Prienai became known as Labas GAS Prienai. Coach Šernius left during the summer, and much of the previous season's roster left the team as well. Labas GAS decided to focus more on young players. The team re-signed point guard Ignas Sargiūnas, who joined the team just last season, and signed talented young players like Erikas Venskus, Rapolas Ivanauskas, Juwan Durham and Jovan Kljajič, all who quickly became one of the leaders of the team along with Sargiūnas. Labas GAS also signed the talented point guard Vasilije Pušica to a deal for the season. He spent most of his time on the injury list, and after a few games, left the team. Marius Leonavičius, long time assistant in Prienai, became the team's new head coach. However, a disastrous 0–11 start in the LKL, and a poor finish in the King Mindaugas Cup, resulting in Labas Gas not even qualifying for the playoffs, resulted in assistant Vidas Ginevičius taking over as interim head coach in December by replacing Leonavičius, before Tomas Gaidamavičius, who recently departed from Neptūnas Klaipėda, was signed as the new head coach for the team. The team's fortunes didn't really improve - despite great play from players like Sargiūnas and Ivanauskas, Labas GAS finished the season in last place in the LKL, with a 3-27 record, though winning two memorable games against BC Juventus during the season, and having many great performances against the leading LKL teams. Despite finishing in last place, Labas GAS remained in the LKL, with LKL choosing not to relegate any team after the season.

The next season, 2022-23 LKL season, was very similar to the previous one. Labas GAS finished last again, this time with a 4-29 record. Coach Gaidamavičius resigned and was replaced by Marius Kiltinavičius, one of the best coaches of the NKL. The team underwent a massive roster turnaround, with only a few players remaining on the team since the season opener. The team did grab memorable wins during their campaign, such as the win against Lietkabelis in Kalnapilio arena, which was also their first victory after starting the season 0-16. Another 3 wins didn't help Prienai avoid relegation, and they were the first team since Mažeikiai in 2015 to be relegated from LKL. The team, in July, did not attempt to receive a license to the NKL.

In July 2023, the club declared bankruptcy and ceased all operations, ending a long and successful chapter in Lithuanian basketball.

The spiritual successor of the team, Prienų KKSC, is currently playing in the third-tier RKL.

== Players ==
=== The last roster for the 2022–2023 season ===
Note: Flags indicate national team eligibility at FIBA-sanctioned events. Players may hold other non-FIBA nationalities not displayed.

Prienai roster
Players
Coaches

Pos.	No.	Nat.	Name	Ht.	Wt.	Age
G	0	(Lithuania)	Domarkas, Dominykas	1.91 m (6 ft 3 in)	87 kg (192 lb)	34 – 24 April 1992
F	2	(Lithuania)	Jogėla, Tauras	2.02 m (6 ft 8 in)	92 kg (203 lb)	33 – 2 May 1993
G/F	5	(Lithuania)	Giedraitis, Karolis	1.94 m (6 ft 4 in)	88 kg (194 lb)	28 – 24 March 1998
PG	10	(United States)	Brown, Brandon	1.78 m (5 ft 10 in)	75 kg (165 lb)	35 – 18 September 1991
F	12	(Lithuania)	Mockus, Mintautas	2.01 m (6 ft 7 in)	85 kg (187 lb)	23 – 14 September 2003
F/C	13	(Lithuania)	Jogminas, Justinas	2.00 m (6 ft 7 in)	100 kg (220 lb)	29 – 24 October 1997
F/C	16	(United Kingdom)	Williams, Jordan	2.03 m (6 ft 8 in)	109 kg (240 lb)	31 – 16 October 1995
F	20	(Lithuania)	Tarvydas, Darius	2.00 m (6 ft 7 in)	98 kg (216 lb)	35 – 11 October 1991
G	23	(Lithuania)	Gūžys, Mantas	1.90 m (6 ft 3 in)	83 kg (183 lb)	33 – 3 August 1993
C	24	(Lithuania)	Keliačius, Robertas	2.10 m (6 ft 11 in)	103 kg (227 lb)	29 – 24 September 1997
C	27	(Lithuania)	Bergaudas, Giedrius	2.12 m (6 ft 11 in)	104 kg (229 lb)	26 – 17 November 2000
PG	55	(United States)	Anderson, Kyan	1.80 m (5 ft 11 in)	80 kg (176 lb)	34 – 25 March 1992
G	88	(Lithuania)	Vilys, Domantas	1.88 m (6 ft 2 in)	80 kg (176 lb)	26 – 12 January 2000

Head coach

- (Lithuania) Marius Kiltinavičius

Assistant coach(es)

- (Lithuania) Andrius Ulčickas
- (Lithuania) Mantas Jančiauskas

Physiotherapist(s)

- (Lithuania) Lukas Dzimidas

Legend

- (C) Team captain
- Injured

- Roster
Updated: March 22, 2023

=== Depth chart ===
Pos.	Starting 5	Bench 1	Bench 2
C	Đoko Šalić	Giedrius Bergaudas	Jonas Paukštė
PF	Justinas Jogminas	Klaidas Metrikis
SF	Jy'lan Washington	Mintautas Mockus
SG	Isiah Osborne	Karolis Giedraitis	Arnas Adomavičius
PG	Brandon Brown	Titas Sargiūnas

=== In ===
No.	Pos.	Nat.	Name	Moving from		Ends
	HC	(Lithuania)	Marius Leonavičius			
3	PG	(Serbia)	Vasilije Pušica	Dinamo Sassari	(Italy)	
12	PG	(Lithuania)	Mintautas Mockus	BC Neptūnas	(Lithuania)	
8	SG	(Montenegro)	Jovan Kljajić	Bilbao Basket	(Spain)	
11	C	(United States)	Juwan Durham	Notre Dame	(United States)	
34	SF	(Lithuania)	Giedrius Stankevičius	BC Neptūnas	(Lithuania)	
7	PF	(Lithuania)	Rapolas Ivanauskas	BC Rytas	(Lithuania)	
27	C	(Lithuania)	Giedrius Bergaudas	BC Žalgiris-2	(Lithuania)	
21	PF	(Lithuania)	Erikas Venskus	BC Lietkabelis	(Lithuania)	
23	PG	(Lithuania)	Mantvydas Staniulis	BC Kuršiai	(Lithuania)	
1	G	(Lithuania)	Dominykas Jurgelionis	CBET-KKSC	(Lithuania)	
21	F	(Lithuania)	Edas Valenta	BC Žalgiris-3	(Lithuania)	

- HC - Head coach

=== Out ===
No.	Pos.	Nat.	Name	Moving to	
10	G	(Lithuania)	Dominykas Domarkas	Astoria Bydgoszcz	(Poland)
29	SF	(Lithuania)	Mindaugas Sušinskas	Niners Chemnitz	(Germany)
18	SG	(Lithuania)	Ernestas Mankauskas	KK Perlas Vilkaviškis	(Lithuania)
37	PF	(Lithuania)	Einaras Tubutis	ZZ Leiden	(Netherlands)
7	G/F	(Lithuania)	Simas Jarumbauskas	BC Pieno Žvaigždės	(Lithuania)
14	SG	(France)	Tom Digbeu	Brisbane Bullets	(Australia)
20	PG	(Belgium)	Manu Lecomte	Cbet	(Lithuania)
11	C	(Lithuania)	Egidijus Dimša	Atletas	(Lithuania)
	HC	(Lithuania)	Mantas Šernius	Pieno žvaigždės Pasvalys	(Lithuania)

- HC - Head coach

=== Team staff ===
General Manager - Adomas Kubilius

Team and Communications Manager - Erikas Kirvelaitis

== Logos ==
Vytautas sponsorship logo (2015–2018)

Skycop sponsorship logo (2018–2019)

Cbet sponsorship logo (2019–2021)

Labas Gas sponsorship logo (2021–2023)

== Honours ==
=== Domestic competitions ===
- LKAL

3rd place (1): 2003

- NKL

Winners (1): 2009

- Lithuanian Basketball League

3rd place (2): 2011, 2012

- LKF Cup

Winners (2): 2013, 2014
3rd place (1): 2011

=== Regional competitions ===
- BBL Championship

Winners (1): 2017
Runners-up (2): 2013, 2014

- BBL Challenge Cup

Runners-up (1): 2010

== Season-by-season ==
Season	Tier	League	Pos.	Baltic League		LKF Cup KMT Cup	European competitions		
2002–03	2	LKAL	3rd						
2003–04	2	LKAL	6th						
2004–05	2	LKAL	12th						
2005–06	2	NKL	4th						
2006–07	2	NKL	7th						
2007–08	2	NKL	9th						
2008–09	2	NKL	1st						
2009–10	1	LKL	7th	Challenge Cup	2nd	Second round			
2010–11	1	LKL	3rd	Elite Division	6th	Third place			
2011–12	1	LKL	3rd	Elite Division	8th	Fourth place	2 Eurocup	RS	3–3
2012–13	1	LKL	4th	Elite Division	2nd	Champion	2 Eurocup	RS	2–4
2013–14	1	LKL	4th	Elite Division	2nd	Champion			
2014–15	1	LKL	9th	Round of 16					
2015–16	1	LKL	5th	Round of 16		Fourth place			
2016–17	1	LKL	6th	Champion		Fourth place	4 FIBA Europe Cup	R2	7–3
2017–18	1	LKL	10th (Note: Relegated, but remained in the league as Vytis did not meet the requirements for a licence in the league.)	Withdrew			3 Champions League	QR1	1–1
2018–19	1	LKL	7th			Quarterfinalist			
2019–20	1	LKL	6th			Round of 16			
2020–21	1	LKL	5th			Quarterfinalist			
2021–22	1	LKL	11th			First round			
2022–23	1	LKL	12th (Note: Relegated)			First round			

Detailed information of former rosters and results.

== Notable players ==
Note: Flags indicate national team eligibility at FIBA-sanctioned events. Players may hold other non-FIBA nationalities not displayed.

Criteria

To appear in this section a player must have either:

- Set a club record or won an individual award while at the club
- Played at least one official international match for their national team at any time
- Played at least one official NBA match at any time.

- (Lithuania) Valdas Dabkus (2010; 2012)
- (Lithuania) Povilas Butkevičius (2010–2012, 2015–2016)
- (Lithuania) Gediminas Orelik (2010–2013)
- (Lithuania) Dainius Šalenga (2011–2012, 2013, 2015–2016)
- (Lithuania) Rolandas Alijevas (2011–2012)
- (Lithuania) Saulius Kuzminskas (2011–2012)
- (Lithuania) Gintaras Kadžiulis (2011–2014)
- (Lithuania) Artūras Valeika (2012–2014)
- (Estonia) Siim-Sander Vene (2012–2013)
- (Lithuania) Mindaugas Lukauskis (2013–2014)
- (Lithuania) Artūras Milaknis (2012–2013)
- (Lithuania) Gediminas Maceina (2017–2020)
- (United States) LaMelo Ball (2018)
- (United States) LiAngelo Ball (2018)

== Head coaches ==
- (Lithuania) Virginijus Šeškus: 2008–2014, 2015–2019
- (Lithuania) Tadas Stankevičius: 2014–2015
- (Lithuania) Mantas Šernius: 2019–2021
- (Lithuania) Marius Leonavičius: 2021–2022
- (Lithuania) Tomas Gaidamavičius: 2022
- (Lithuania) Marius Kiltinavičius: 2022–2023

== Sponsors ==
The club is very closely related with the Royal Spa Residence in Birštonas. All of the team members are living there and the season closing events are also taking place there. In January 2018, weeks after Vytautas signed American brothers LaMelo and LiAngelo Ball, their father's sports apparel company Big Baller Brand was named an official team sponsor. The brand was also the sponsor of two exhibition competitions Vytautas took part in early 2018: the Big Baller Brand Challenge Games in January and the Big Baller Brand International Tournament in February.
