= Rokas Gustys =

Lithuanian basketball player (born 1994)

No. 33 – Tachikawa Dice
- Position: Center
- League: B.League

Personal information
- Born: 22 August 1994 (age 32) Kaunas, Lithuania
- Listed height: 2.06 m (6 ft 9 in)
- Listed weight: 110 kg (243 lb)

Career information
- High school: Oak Hill Academy (Mouth of Wilson, Virginia)
- College: Hofstra (2014–2018)
- NBA draft: 2018: undrafted
- Playing career: 2018–present

Career history
- 2018–2019: Palencia Baloncesto
- 2019–2020: BC Šiauliai
- 2020–2021: Rytas Vilnius
- 2021–2022: Juventus
- 2022–2023: Neptūnas Klaipėda
- 2023: London Lions
- 2023–2024: Shonan United
- 2024–2025: Tokyo United
- 2025–present: Tachikawa Dice

Career highlights
- First-team All-CAA (2016); Third-team All-CAA (2018); CAA All-Defensive Team (2016)
Medals
Men's basketball
Representing Lithuania
FIBA World Under-19 Championship
Bronze medal – third place	2013 Czech Republic	U-19 Team
FIBA Europe Under-18 Championship
Silver medal – second place	2012 Latvia/Lithuania	U-18 Team

Rokas Gustys (born 22 August 1994) is a Lithuanian professional basketball player for the Tokyo United of the B.League. Gustys has competed with the Lithuanian junior national teams on multiple occasions.

== Early life and high school ==
Gustys was born in Kaunas, Lithuania where he went to school and played basketball until 2012. In the summer of 2012 he went to the US to study and play basketball at Oak Hill Academy where he helped lead to a 41–4 record and a number four ranking in the USA Today Sports Super 25 during the 2013–14 season, averaging 12 points and a team-high nine rebounds per game for the Warriors as a senior.

== College career ==
Gustys had a very successful career at Hofstra University, he finished his career ranked first all-time in Hofstra's NCAA Division I history with 1,305 rebounds. His rebounding total is second all-time in Colonial Athletic Association history to Hall of Famer David Robinson. Only the third player since 1996 to rank in the top five in the nation in rebounding in three straight seasons, joining Paul Millsap and Kenneth Faried. He totaled 1,184 career points to rank 25th all-time in program history. Gustys had 48 career double-doubles, averaged 9.9 points and 10.9 rebounds per game over his four seasons. As a senior, Gustys averaged 10.5 points and 12.0 rebounds per game.

== Professional career ==
Gustys made his professional debut with BC Palencia signing a one-year contract. In 2019 he came back to Lithuania, signing with BC Šiauliai. On 10 March 2020, Gustys achieved a Lithuanian Basketball League record for most offensive rebounds (13). Overall, he had an impressive season, averaging 11,3 points, 6,5 rebounds, becoming one of the best center's in the 2019/20 LKL season.

On 10 July 2020, Rytas Vilnius announced a contract signing with Rokas Gustys, until 2023.

On 22 September 2023, Gustys signed a month-long contract with Covirán Granada of the Liga ACB. He parted ways with the team on 30 October 2023, once the contract had ended. That same day, he signed with London Lions, which compete in the EuroCup. He left the club on 28 November 2023.

On 21 December 2023, Gustys signed with Shonan United of the B.League.

On 19 June 2024, Gustys signed with Tokyo United of the B.League.

On 27 June 2025, Gustys signed with Tachikawa Dice.
