= Artūras Milaknis =

Lithuanian basketball player (born 1986)

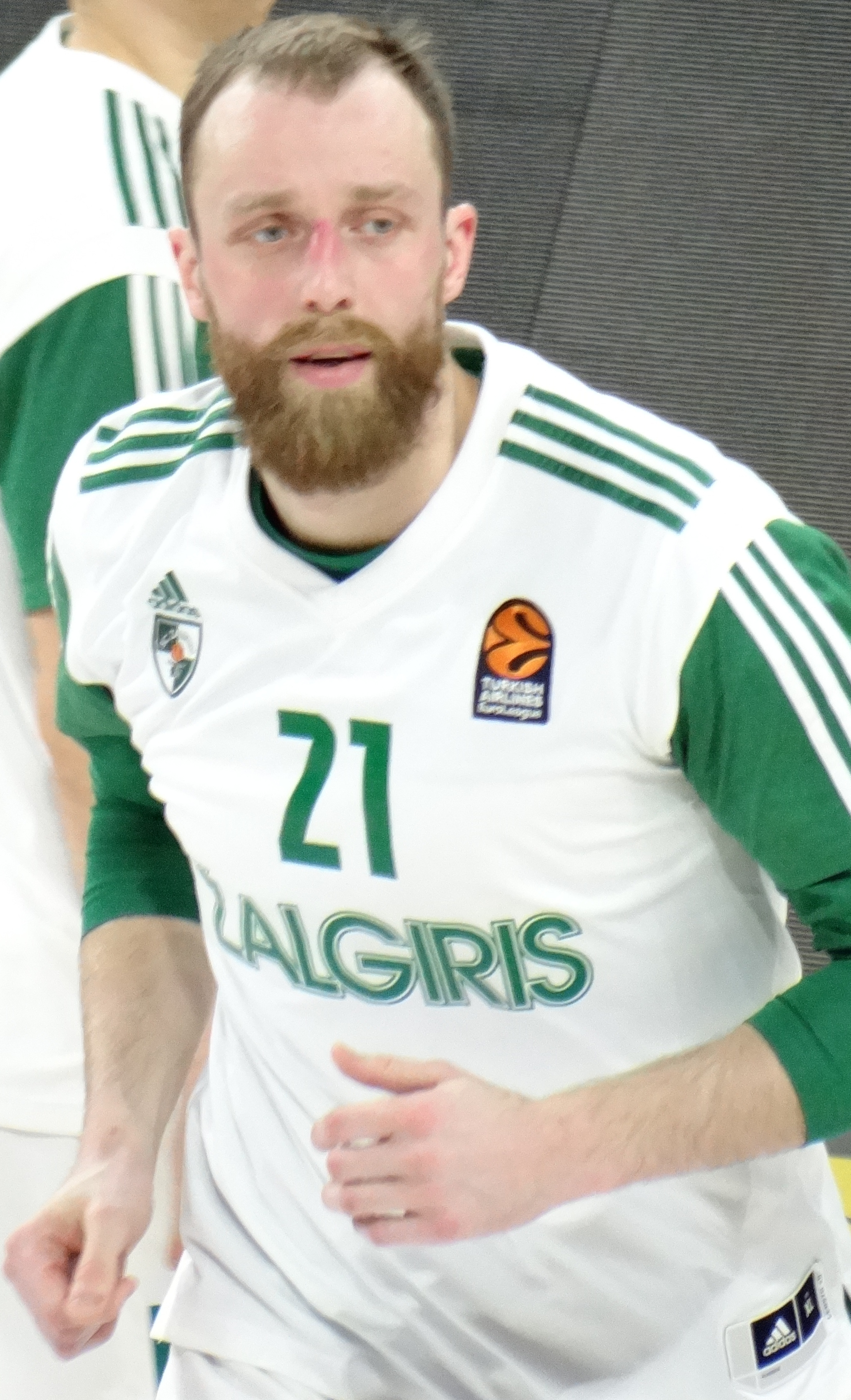
- Milaknis with Žalgiris Kaunas in 2018

Jonava Hipocredit
- Title: Assistant coach
- League: LKL

Personal information
- Born: 16 June 1986 (age 40) Kaunas, Lithuania
- Listed height: 6 ft 4.7 in (1.95 m)
- Listed weight: 211 lb (96 kg)

Career information
- NBA draft: 2008: undrafted
- Playing career: 2004–2023
- Position: Shooting guard / small forward
- Number: 21, 20, 24, 33
- Coaching career: 2025–present

Career history

Playing
- 2004–2006: Bremena Tauragė
- 2006–2011: Žalgiris Kaunas
- 2006–2007: →Žalgiris-Arvydas Sabonis school Kaunas
- 2008: →Kaunas Triobet
- 2011–2013: Rūdupis Prienai / Prienai
- 2013–2015: Žalgiris Kaunas
- 2015–2016: UNICS Kazan
- 2016–2022: Žalgiris Kaunas
- 2022–2023: Tofaş

Coaching
- 2025–present: Jonava Hipocredit (assistant)

Career highlights
- 10× LKL champion (2007, 2008, 2011, 2014, 2015, 2017, 2018, 2019–2021); LKL Finals MVP (2015); LKL All-Star (2015); 4× King Mindaugas Cup winner (2017, 2018, 2020, 2021, 2022); 5× LKF Cup winner (2007, 2008, 2011, 2013, 2015); 3× BBL champion (2008, 2010, 2011); LKL records: LKL all-time leader in three-pointers made
Medals
Men's basketball
Representing Lithuania
EuroBasket
Silver medal – second place	2015 France–Croatia–Germany–Latvia

Artūras Milaknis (born 16 June 1986) is a Lithuanian professional basketball coach and former player. He is currently an assistant coach for Jonava Hipocredit of the Lithuanian Basketball League (LKL). Standing at 1.95 m (6 ft 5 in), he primarily played at the shooting guard position.

== Early career ==
A native of Kaunas, Milaknis began his career in the second division National Basketball League (NKL), playing for Bremena Tauragė. In 2006, he went on to play with Žalgiris-Arvydas Sabonis school, the junior team of Žalgiris Kaunas.

== Professional career ==
In the 2007–2008 season, Milaknis made his Žalgiris' main team debut. Since then, apart from playing two full seasons in 2009–2010 and 2010–2011, he would be loaned to a few different teams, up until 2013, when he signed a 2+1 deal after a successful season with BC Prienai. In the next two years, he became an important part of the team, and soon gained attention from various international clubs. In the summer of 2015, Milaknis was invited to join the Dallas Mavericks training camp. On 9 July 2015, he signed a two-year contract with the Russian club UNICS Kazan.

On 7 August 2016, Milaknis returned to Žalgiris as he signed a three-year contract. It was extended for an additional year on 7 June 2019.

On 14 October 2022, Milaknis signed a one-year deal with Tofaş of Turkish Basketbol Süper Ligi (BSL).

On 24 May 2024, Milaknis announced his retirement from professional basketball.

== National team career ==
In 2015, Milaknis was included into the senior Lithuanian national team extended candidates list, by the team's head coach, Jonas Kazlauskas. Aged 29, he qualified into the final roster of the senior Lithuanian national team, for the first time in his career, and he represented the national team at the EuroBasket 2015. The Lithuanian team ended up winning the silver medal at the tournament.

He played at the EuroBasket 2017.

== Coaching career ==
On 21 October 2025, Milaknis started his coaching career and was named as an assistant coach for Jonava Hipocredit of the Lithuanian Basketball League (LKL).

== Career statistics ==
Legend
GP	Games played	GS	Games started	MPG	Minutes per game
FG%	Field-goal percentage	3P%	3-point field-goal percentage	FT%	Free-throw percentage
RPG	Rebounds per game	APG	Assists per game	SPG	Steals per game
BPG	Blocks per game	PPG	Points per game	PIR	Performance index rating
**Bold**	Career high

=== EuroLeague ===
*	Led the league

Year	Team	GP	GS	MPG	FG%	3P%	FT%	RPG	APG	SPG	BPG	PPG	PIR
2007–08	Žalgiris	2	0	2.5	.500	.000	—	—	—	—	—	1.0	0.5
2008–09	Žalgiris	5	0	14.8	**.611**	**.571**	.500	1.2	.2	—	—	6.2	5.0
2009–10	Žalgiris	11	0	8.0	.500	.500	.500	.4	—	.3	—	2.5	1.0
2010–11	Žalgiris	15	9	15.5	.368	.308	.800	1.0	.4	.7	—	3.9	1.3
2013–14	Žalgiris	24	4	18.3	.458	.432	.667	**2.0**	.7	.3	.0	6.4	4.8
2014–15	Žalgiris	24	10	**25.9**	.462	.462	.778	1.8	**1.4**	.3	**.1**	**10.0**	**8.0**
2016–17	Žalgiris	30	8	21.1	.474	.386	.762	1.5	1.0	.3	.0	7.3	4.6
2017–18	Žalgiris	**36***	8	22.4	.471	.449	.826	**2.0**	.9	.4	**.1**	8.0	6.6
2018–19	Žalgiris	34	10	23.1	.403	.417	.853	1.4	.9	.6	**.1**	7.0	5.3
2019–20	Žalgiris	28*	10	21.6	.466	.395	.833	1.5	.6	**.9**	.0	7.4	6.7
2020–21	Žalgiris	25	**12**	18.2	.473	.470	**1.000**	1.0	.7	.5	.1	6.0	5.6
2021–22	Žalgiris	31	5	20.2	.428	.416	.931	.9	.6	.5	.1	7.3	6.0
Career		265	76	20.4	.443	.425	.826	1.4	.8	.5	.1	6.9	5.1
