= 2017–18 BC Prienai season =

- President: (Lithuania) Norbertas Pranckus
- Head coach: (Lithuania) Virginijus Šeškus
- Staples center: Prienai Arena
- LKL: Last Place (Not Relegated)
- BBL: Withdrew
- BCL: Failed to qualify
- Scoring leader: (Lithuania) Eigirdas Žukauskas 12.7
- Rebounding leader: (Lithuania) Eigirdas Žukauskas 5.7
- Assists leader: (Lithuania) Tomas Dimša 4.0
- Biggest win: 91–56 Tsmoki-Minsk (25 October 2017)
- Biggest defeat: 56–113 Lietuvos rytas (6 January 2018)
| Home | Away |
- All statistics correct as of April 1, 2018.

The team played in the Lithuanian Basketball League (LKL) and participated in the Baltic Basketball League (BBL) and in the qualifying round of the Basketball Champions League (BCL). The team entered its 23rd season in the 2017–18 BC Prienai season, formerly Vytautas Prienai–Birštonas.

In December 2017, Vytautas signed the American brothers LaMelo and LiAngelo Ball. Following the brothers' arrival, Vytautas withdrew from the BBL and announced Big Baller Brand, a sports apparel company owned by LaVar Ball, as its sponsor. After the Ball brothers joined the team in January 2018, Vytautas played several exhibition games, including the Big Baller Brand Challenge Games, and the Big Baller Brand International Tournament.

== Overview ==
Vytautas started the 2017-18 season by failing to qualify for the 2017-18 Basketball Champions League season. The team was underperforming in the national competition and saw decreasing fans' popularity. Additionally, Vytautas faced major financial struggles, failing to pay many former players. Toward the beginning of the season, the team controversially signed businessman Tomas Tumynas, who had no prior professional basketball experience. According to head coach Virginijus Šeškus, Tumynas helped Vytautas financially, despite not playing any games before his release in January 2018. The team lost to Lietuvos rytas Vilnius on 6 January 2018 by a margin of 113–56, its worst defeat. After the game, Vytautas dropped to last place in their league.

On 11 December 2017, Vytautas signed LiAngelo and LaMelo Ball, the younger brothers of Los Angeles Lakers player Lonzo Ball, both of whom agreed to join the team at the beginning of January 2018. Both brothers, along with Lonzo, had helped lead Chino Hills High School to an undefeated season. LiAngelo was arrested for shoplifting in China, abruptly ending his college basketball career at UCLA and culminating in a Twitter-based feud between his father, LaVar Ball, and U.S. President Donald Trump. The Lithuanian team, whose managers described the signing as an instant success, subsequently received international attention and were featured in The New York Times. Upon the Ball brothers' arrival, the Lithuanian Basketball League (LKL) rescheduled Vytautas' games against Pieno žvaigždės Pasvalys and Juventus Utena to suit their American audience.

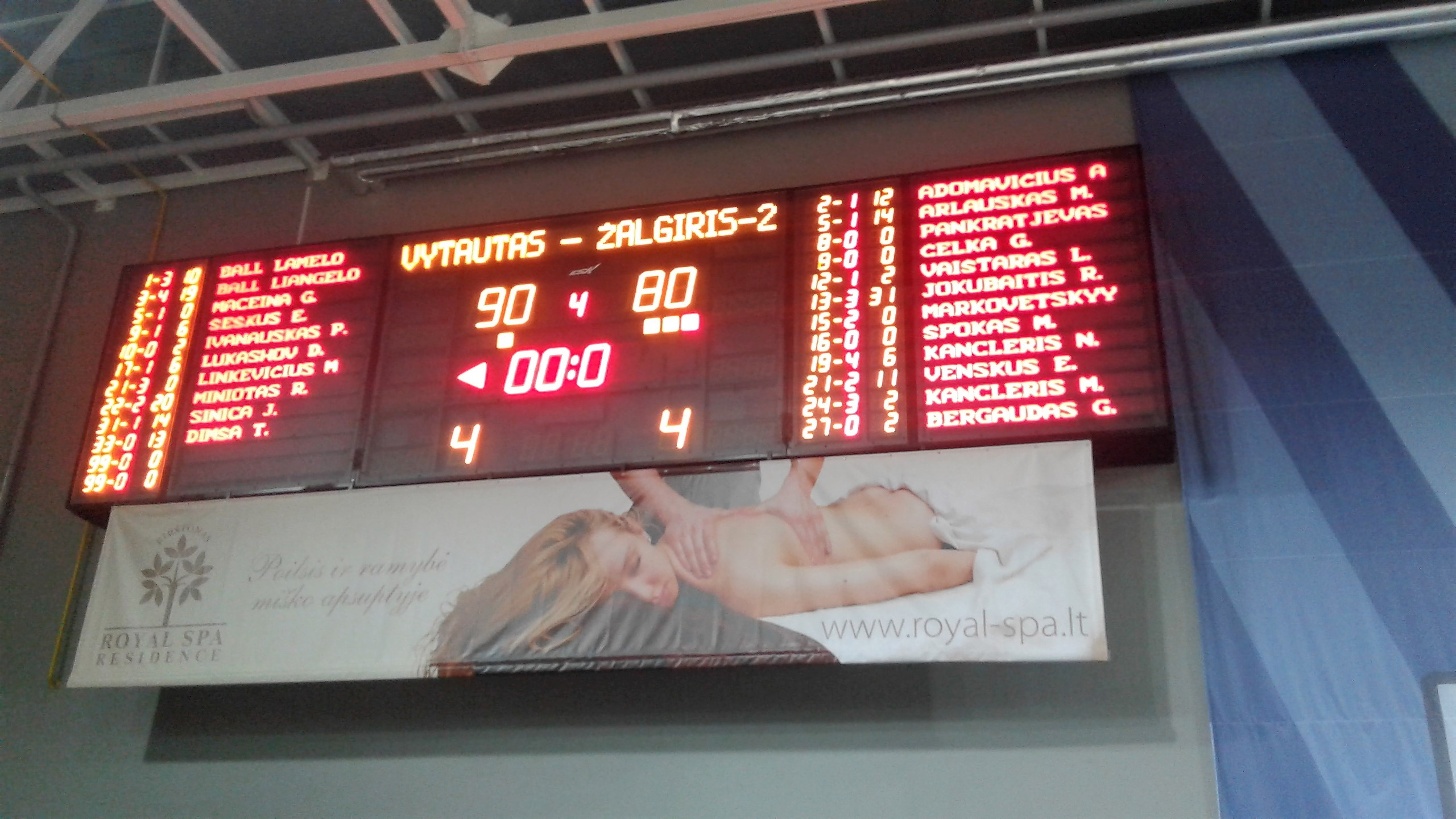
The final scoreboard at Vytautas' first game at the Big Baller Brand Challenge Games.

In early January 2018, Vytautas pulled out of the Baltic Basketball League season, instead setting up and hosting the Big Baller Brand Challenge Games, a series of exhibition games mostly against opponents from lower Lithuanian leagues. On 23 January 2018, the team announced that the sports apparel company Big Baller Brand would be an official sponsor until the end of the season. LaVar Ball, owner of the company, was appointed as assistant coach for a match-up with Dzūkija Alytus and then as head coach against Jonava. Ball and his family helped the team pay off the club's debts, contributing €100,000.

By the end of February, Vytautas announced that it would play in another exhibition event sponsored by the company, the Big Baller Brand International Tournament, a round-robin competition featuring three European teams outside of Lithuania. LaVar Ball continued to serve as head coach. In late March and early April, Vytautas participated in two more friendlies, hosting a game against a youth squad of the Chinese team Guangdong Southern Tigers and facing the London Lions of the British Basketball League (BBL) in London.

=== Controversial changes and avoiding relegation ===
However, after the end of the team's exhibition games, head coach Virginijus Šeškus made drastic changes to avoid the threat of relegation, most notably by sitting LaMelo Ball throughout the rest of the regular season. Following the changes, Vytautas embarked on a three-game winning streak, diminishing the threat of relegation. Following a 73-69 loss to Siauliai on April 25, LaVar Ball announced his decision to remove his sons from the team, even though none of the Ball players participated.

After losing that night, Vytautas would lose their last three games of the season, with the team letting go of Kervin Bristol, Rashaun Broadus, and Denys Lukashov before the end of their final game that season. As a result, Vytautas faced the threat of relegation to the second-division NKL, with Vytis Akiai aiming for promotion.

Despite finishing the season in last place, Vytautas managed to avoid relegation this season, as Vytis failed to meet the necessary promotion requirements.

== Players ==
=== Squad information ===
Note: Flags indicate national team eligibility at FIBA-sanctioned events. Players may hold other non-FIBA nationalities not displayed.

Vytautas Prienai-Birštonas roster
Players
Coaches

| Pos. | No. | Nat. | Name | Ht. | Wt. | Age |
|---|---|---|---|---|---|---|
| SF | 7 | (Lithuania) | Aleksandravičius, Bartas | 1.88 m (6 ft 2 in) | 73 kg (161 lb) | 26 – 20 July 1999 |
| C | 55 | (Haiti) | Bristol, Kervin | 2.08 m (6 ft 10 in) | 102 kg (225 lb) | 37 – 4 September 1988 |
| PG | 16 | (Albania) | Broadus, Rashaun | 1.80 m (5 ft 11 in) | 87 kg (192 lb) | 41 – 5 August 1984 |
| PF | 11 | (Lithuania) | Dimša, Egidijus | 2.05 m (6 ft 9 in) | 95 kg (209 lb) | 41 – 1 April 1985 |
| G | 10 | (Lithuania) | Ivanauskas, Paulius | 1.95 m (6 ft 5 in) | 79 kg (174 lb) | 39 – 24 April 1987 |
| SF | 21 | (Lithuania) | Linkevičius, Martynas | 1.97 m (6 ft 6 in) | 95 kg (209 lb) | 40 – 8 December 1985 |
| PG | 17 | (Ukraine) | Lukashov, Denys | 1.88 m (6 ft 2 in) | 82 kg (181 lb) | 37 – 30 April 1989 |
| PG | 5 | (Lithuania) | Maceina, Gediminas | 1.88 m (6 ft 2 in) | 74 kg (163 lb) | 41 – 28 August 1984 |
| F/C | 22 | (Lithuania) | Miniotas, Regimantas | 2.06 m (6 ft 9 in) | 90 kg (198 lb) | 30 – 14 March 1996 |
| F | 31 | (Lithuania) | Sinica, Justas | 2.03 m (6 ft 8 in) | 82 kg (181 lb) | 40 – 31 May 1985 |
| SG | 9 | (Lithuania) | Šeškus, Edvinas | 1.96 m (6 ft 5 in) | 80 kg (176 lb) | 31 – 10 March 1995 |
| G | 6 | (Lithuania) | Žukauskas, Eigirdas (C) | 2.01 m (6 ft 7 in) | 98 kg (216 lb) | 33 – 3 June 1992 |

Head coach

- (Lithuania) Virginijus Šeškus

Assistant coach(es)

- (Lithuania) Mindaugas Arlauskas
- (Lithuania) Marius Leonavičius

Legend

- (C) Team captain
- Injured

- Roster
Updated: April 29, 2018

=== Depth chart ===
| Pos. | Starting 5 | Bench 1 | Bench 2 | Bench 3 |
|---|---|---|---|---|
| C | Kervin Bristol |
| PF | Regimantas Miniotas | Eigirdas Žukauskas | Egidijus Dimša |
| SF | LiAngelo Ball | Justas Sinica | Martynas Linkevičius | Bartas Aleksandravičius |
| SG | Edvinas Šeškus | Paulius Ivanauskas |
| PG | Rashaun Broadus | Denys Lukashov | LaMelo Ball | Gediminas Maceina |

=== Players In ===
| Position | # | Player | Moving from | Ref. |
|---|---|---|---|---|
| SF | 7 | (Lithuania) Bartas Aleksandravičius | (Lithuania) Vilniaus KM-99-II | |
| PG | 0 | (Latvia) Karlis Apsitis | (Latvia) Ogre/Kumho Tyre | |
| PG | 1 | (United States) LaMelo Ball | (United States) Chino Hills Huskies | |
| SG | 3 | (United States) LiAngelo Ball | (United States) UCLA Bruins | |
| C | 55 | (Haiti) Kervin Bristol | (Ukraine) Budivelnyk Kyiv | |
| PG | 16 | (Albania) Rashaun Broadus | (Canada) St. John's Edge | |
| PF | 11 | (Lithuania) Egidijus Dimša | (Lithuania) Pieno žvaigždės Pasvalys | |
| C | 44 | (Lithuania) Ovidijus Galdikas | (Lithuania) Juventus Utena | |
| PF | — | (Lithuania) Denis Krestinin^{1} | (Latvia) Barons/LDz | |
| PG | 17 | (Ukraine) Denys Lukashov | (Russia) Enisey | |
| PG | 5 | (Lithuania) Gediminas Maceina | (Lithuania) Vytis Šakiai | |
| SF | 31 | (Lithuania) Justas Sinica | (France) Caen Basket Calvados | |
| PG | 1 | (United States) Brad Tinsley | (Portugal) FC Porto | |
| SF | 13 | (Lithuania) Tomas Tumynas^{1} | None | |
| SG/SF | 6 | (Lithuania) Eigirdas Žukauskas | (France) Saint-Chamond Basket | |

=== Players Out ===
| Position | # | Player | Moving to | Ref. |
|---|---|---|---|---|
| PG | 0 | (Latvia) Karlis Apsitis | (Germany) TG Würzburg | |
| SG/SF | 21 | (Lithuania) Arnas Beručka | (Lithuania) Lietuvos rytas Vilnius | |
| C | 11 | (Lithuania) Laurynas Birutis | (Lithuania) Šiauliai | |
| PG | 31 | (Lithuania) Vytenis Čižauskas | (Estonia) Tartu | |
| PG/SG | 9 | (Lithuania) Tomas Delininkaitis | (Lithuania) Neptūnas Klaipėda | |
| C | 44 | (Lithuania) Ovidijus Galdikas | None | |
| SG | 33 | (Lithuania) Darius Gvezdauskas | None | |
| PF | — | (Lithuania) Denis Krestinin^{1} | (Latvia) Jūrmala | |
| SF/PF | 12 | (Lithuania) Saulius Kulvietis | (Spain) Joventut Badalona | |
| SF/PF | 18 | (Lithuania) Vytenis Lipkevičius | (Germany) s.Oliver Würzburg | |
| SG/SF | 32 | (Lithuania) Tomas Michnevičius | None | |
| PF | 19 | (Lithuania) Mantas Šerkšnas | (Lithuania) Neptūnas-Akvaservis | |
| PG | 22 | (Lithuania) Domantas Šeškus | (France) Cognac Basket Ball | |
| PG | 1 | (United States) Brad Tinsley | (Germany) BV Chemnitz 99 | |
| SF | 13 | (Lithuania) Tomas Tumynas^{1} | None | |
| PF | 11 | (Lithuania) Artūras Valeika | (Romania) CSM Oradea | |
| SG/SF | 3 | (United States) LiAngelo Ball | (United States) Los Angeles Ballers | |
| PG | 1 | (United States) LaMelo Ball | (United States) Los Angeles Ballers | |

Notes:

- ^{1} Sign and trade. Didn't play a single regular season game.

== Club ==
=== Technical staff ===
| Position | Staff member |
|---|---|
| Club President | (Lithuania) Norbertas Pranckus |
| Honorary President | (Lithuania) Aurimas Bartuška |
| Team Director | (Lithuania) Adomas Kubilius |
| Sports Director | (Lithuania) Vilius Vaitkevičius |
| Press Officer | (Lithuania) Erikas Kirvelaitis |
| Assistant Coaches | (Lithuania) Mindaugas Arlauskas |
| Assistant Coaches | (Lithuania) Marius Leonavičius |

=== Kit ===
- Supplier: AGO
- Main sponsors: Big Baller Brand, Skycop.com
- Back sponsors: ADMA, Ekofrisa
- Short sponsors: SIL, Perlas

| Home | Away |

== Friendlies ==
Win Loss

Big Baller Brand Challenge Games

| 9 January 2018 | Vytautas Prienai–Birštonas (Lithuania) | 90–80 | (Lithuania) Žalgiris-2 Kaunas | Prienai |
| | Scoring by quarter: 19–16, 16–21, 31–17, 14–16 |
| | Pts: Miniotas 20; Rebs: Miniotas 13; Asts: La. Ball 9 PIR: not available | Boxscore | Pts: Jokubaitis 31; Rebs: Venskus 10; Asts: Arlauskas 3 PIR: not available | Arena: Prienai Arena; Attendance: 1,500 |

| 15 January 2018 | Vytautas Prienai–Birštonas (Lithuania) | 130–93 | (Lithuania) Lietuvos-rytas-2 Vilnius | Prienai |
| 20:30 (EET) | Scoring by quarter: 32–19, 32–22, 34–19, 32–33 |
| | Pts: La. Ball 31; Rebs: Bristol 7 Asts: La. Ball 9 PIR: not available | Boxscore | Pts: Sirvydis 19; Rebs: Naruševičius 11; Asts: Jermolajevas, Marčiulionis 3 PIR: not available | Arena: Prienai Arena; Attendance: 1,200 |

| 17 January 2018 | Vytautas Prienai–Birštonas (Lithuania) | 93–89 | (Lithuania) Vytis Šakiai | Prienai |
| 21:00 (EET) | Scoring by quarter: 21–18, 22–28, 28–27, 22–16 |
| | Pts: Li. Ball 22; Rebs: Bristol 8 Asts: Dimša 8 | Boxscore | Pts: Užupis, Wanamaker 13; Rebs: Užupis 9 Asts: Juknevičius, Wanamaker 6 | Arena: Prienai Arena; Attendance: 1,000 |

| 23 January 2018 | Vytautas Prienai–Birštonas (Lithuania) | 147–142 | (Lithuania) Dzūkija Alytus | Prienai |
| 21:00 (EET) | Scoring by quarter: 34–37, 33–33, 40–37, 40–35 |
| | Pts: La. Ball 43; Rebs: Miniotas 9 Asts: La. Ball 10 | Boxscore | Pts: Petrilevičius 35; Rebs: Žalalis 11; Asts: Danisevičius 8 | Arena: Prienai Arena; Attendance: 1,000 |

| 28 January 2018 | Vytautas Prienai–Birštonas (Lithuania) | 151–120 | (Lithuania) Jonava | Prienai |
| 21:00 (EET) | Scoring by quarter: 32–22, 36–42, 49–31, 34–23 |
| | Pts: La. Ball 40; Rebs: Miniotas 17; Asts: La. Ball 10 | | Pts: Hobbs 30; Rebs: Hobbs 10; Asts: Hobbs 8 | Arena: Prienai Arena; Attendance: 1,000 |

Big Baller Brand International Tournament

| 25 February 2018 1 | Vytautas Prienai–Birštonas (Lithuania) | 133–141 | (Latvia) VEF Rīga Skola | Prienai |
| 21:00 (EET) | Scoring by quarter: 49–25, 22–38, 31–32, 31–46 |
| | Pts: Šeškus 35; Rebs: Miniotas 13; Asts: La. Ball 8 | Boxscore | Pts: Zotovs 29; Rebs: Čavars 12; Asts: Zotovs 14 | Arena: Prienai Arena; Attendance: 800; Referees: Jurgis Laurinavičius (LTU), Juozas Barkauskas (LTU), Mantas Butvilas (LTU) |

| 26 February 2018 2 | Vytautas Prienai–Birštonas (Lithuania) | 96–128 | (Poland) Wilki Morskie Szczecin | Prienai |
| 21:00 (EET) | Scoring by quarter: 24–34, 24–27, 30–32, 18–35 |
| | Pts: Li. Ball 26; Rebs: Miniotas 7 Asts: La. Ball 9 | Boxscore | Pts: Jogėla 24; Rebs: Benjamin 14; Asts: Paliukėnas 8 | Arena: Prienai Arena; Attendance: 500; Referees: Jurgis Laurinavičius (LTU), Juozas Barkauskas (LTU), Šarūnas Gabrilavičius (LTU) |

| 27 February 2018 3 | Vytautas Prienai–Birštonas (Lithuania) | 87–96 | (Slovenia) Helios Suns Domžale | Prienai |
| 21:00 (EET) | Scoring by quarter: 21–23, 26–22, 23–23, 17–28 |
| | Pts: Li. Ball 30; Rebs: Bristol 14; Asts: Maceina 10 | | Pts: Oman, Klavžar 22; Rebs: Đumić 8 Asts: Klavžar, Đumić 6 | Arena: Prienai Arena |

Other friendlies

| 27 March 2018 | Vytautas Prienai–Birštonas (Lithuania) | 159–115 | (China) Guangdong Southern Tigers (Jr.) | Prienai |
| 21:30 (EET) | Scoring by quarter: 32–24, 43–31, 41–25, 43–35 |
| | Pts: Li. Ball 72; Rebs: Miniotas 16; Asts: La. Ball 13 | Boxscore | Pts: Xu M.Z. 29; Rebs: Wang D.R. 7 Asts: Xu J. 11 | Arena: Prienai Arena |

| 2 April 2018 | London Lions (United Kingdom) | 110–127 | (Lithuania) Vytautas Prienai–Birštonas | London |
| 16:00 (GMT) | Scoring by quarter: 30–28, 34–37, 25–33, 21–29 |
| | Pts: Spencer 32; Rebs: Dixon 20; Asts: Spencer 8 | Boxscore | Pts: Li. Ball 44; Rebs: Bristol 23; Asts: La. Ball 16 | Arena: Copper Box Arena |

== Competitions ==
=== Overall ===
| Competition | Started round | Final position / round | First match | Last match |
|---|---|---|---|---|
| Lithuanian Basketball League | Matchday 1 | In progress | September 24, 2017 | May 2, 2018 |
| Baltic Basketball League | Matchday 1 | Withdrew | October 25, 2017 | December 23, 2017 |
| Basketball Champions League | Qualifying round 1 | Failed to qualify | September 19, 2017 | September 21, 2017 |

Source: Competitions

=== Overview ===
| Competition | Record | | | | | | | |
| Competition | Pld | W | D | L | PF | PA | PD | Win % |
|---|---|---|---|---|---|---|---|---|
| Lithuanian Basketball League | 27 | 5 | 0 | 22 | 2,138 | 2,371 | −233 | 18.52 |
| Baltic Basketball League | 6 | 3 | 0 | 3 | 400 | 363 | +37 | 50.00 |
| Basketball Champions League | 2 | 1 | 0 | 1 | 138 | 159 | −21 | 50.00 |
| Total | 35 | 9 | 0 | 26 | 2,676 | 2,893 | −217 | 25.71 |

Last updated: March 28, 2018
Source: Competitions

=== Lithuanian Basketball League ===
==== League table ====
| Pos | Team | Pld | W | L | PF | PA | PD | Qualification or relegation |
|---|---|---|---|---|---|---|---|---|
| 6 | Pieno žvaigždės | 36 | 14 | 22 | 2894 | 3140 | −246 | Advance to play-offs |
| 7 | Juventus | 36 | 13 | 23 | 2918 | 3029 | −111 | Advance to play-offs |
| 8 | Nevėžis | 36 | 12 | 24 | 2805 | 2993 | −188 | Advance to play-offs |
| 9 | Dzūkija | 36 | 10 | 26 | 2721 | 3030 | −309 | |
| 10 | Vytautas (Note: If other 9 LKL teams and Vytis from National Basketball League (NKL) meet the licensing requirements, Vytautas would be relegated. However, Vytis did not meet licensing requirements, meaning Vytautas stayed onto the LKL for at least another season.) | 36 | 8 | 28 | 2805 | 3125 | −320 | Relegation to NKL |

Source: LKL
Notes:

Win Loss

==== Matches ====
| 24 September 2017 1 | Vytautas Prienai–Birštonas | 59–61 | Šiauliai | Prienai |
| 17:00 (EET) | Scoring by quarter: 11–26, 11–15, 17–10, 20–10 |
| | Pts: Klimavičius 14; Rebs: E. Dimša 9 Asts: T. Dimša 6 | Report | Pts: Birutis, Urbutis 16; Rebs: Birutis 11; Asts: Sabeckis 4 | Arena: Prienai Arena; Attendance: 400; Referees: Andrius Maleckas, Gvidas Gedvilas |

| 27 September 2017 2 | Vytautas Prienai–Birštonas | 80–84 | Dzūkija Alytus | Prienai |
| 19:00 (EET) | Scoring by quarter: 19–19, 20–17, 21–19, 20–29 |
| | Pts: Sinica 16; Rebs: E. Dimša 9 Asts: T. Dimša 7 | Report | Pts: Reinhardt 24; Rebs: Reinhardt 7 Asts: Hernández 4 | Arena: Prienai Arena; Attendance: 315; Referees: Gintaras Vitkauskas, Gintaras Mačiulis, Žydrūnas Paliušis |

| 1 October 2017 3 | Vytautas Prienai–Birštonas | 78–94 | Neptūnas Klaipėda | Prienai |
| 17:00 (EET) | Scoring by quarter: 20–19, 18–22, 18–28, 22–25 |
| | Pts: T. Dimša 15; Rebs: Linkevičius 6 Asts: Žukauskas 5 | Report | Pts: Seibutis 19; Rebs: Butkevičius, Seibutis 6 Asts: Butkevičius, Palacios 6 | Arena: Prienai Arena; Attendance: 400; Referees: Tomas Jasevičius, Gvidas Gedvilas, Ignas Davainis |

| 5 October 2017 4 | Vytautas Prienai–Birštonas | 69–75 | Lietuvos rytas Vilnius | Prienai |
| 18:30 (EET) | Scoring by quarter: 17–20, 19–16, 24–25, 9–14 |
| | Pts: Klimavičius 20; Rebs: Klimavičius 6 Asts: Maceina 5 | Report | Pts: Madgen 21; Rebs: Echodas 6 Asts: Carter, Kramer 4 | Arena: Prienai Arena; Attendance: 800; Referees: Andrius Maleckas, Mindaugas Večerskis, Aurimas Borusas |

| 8 October 2017 5 | Lietkabelis Panevėžys | 87–69 | Vytautas Prienai–Birštonas | Panevėžys |
| 16:00 (EET) | Scoring by quarter: 19–17, 21–12, 19–19, 28–21 |
| | Pts: Juškevičius 14; Rebs: K. Lavrinovič 6 Asts: Talton 6 | Report | Pts: Sinica 19; Rebs: Linkevičius 11; Asts: T. Dimša 8 | Arena: Cido Arena; Attendance: 2,488; Referees: Gytis Vilius, Martynas Gudas, Šarūnas Gabrilavičius |

| 14 October 2017 6 | Pieno žvaigždės Pasvalys | 80–74 | Vytautas Prienai–Birštonas | Pasvalys |
| 17:00 (EET) | Scoring by quarter: 19–22, 14–19, 18–15, 29–18 |
| | Pts: Ausējs 17; Rebs: Ausējs, Balašov 5 Asts: Lekūnas 4 | Report | Pts: Šeškus, Žukauskas 18; Rebs: Klimavičius, Žukauskas 7 Asts: Žukauskas 5 | Arena: Pieno žvaigždės Arena; Attendance: 250; Referees: Jurgis Laurinavičius, Andrius Maleckas, Andžej Urbanovič |

| 22 October 2017 7 | Žalgiris Kaunas | 97–54 | Vytautas Prienai–Birštonas | Kaunas |
| 17:20 (EET) | Scoring by quarter: 25–17, 25–17, 22–9, 25–11 |
| | Pts: Kavaliauskas 16; Rebs: Jankūnas, Masiulis 7 Asts: Davies, Pangos 5 | Report | Pts: Lukashov 12; Rebs: Klimavičius 3 Asts: Žukauskas 4 | Arena: Žalgiris Arena; Attendance: 2,578; Referees: Artūras Šukys, Mindaugas Večerskis, Oleg Barkovskij |

| 28 October 2017 8 | Juventus Utena | 77–68 | Vytautas Prienai–Birštonas | Utena |
| 17:00 (EET) | Scoring by quarter: 20–9, 18–14, 16–15, 23–30 |
| | Pts: Bičkauskis, Ireland 15; Rebs: Korniyenko 11; Asts: Bičkauskis, Korniyenko 5 | Report | Pts: Sinica 17; Rebs: Žukauskas 6 Asts: Lukashov 8 | Arena: Utena Arena; Attendance: 1,243; Referees: Vilius Mačiulaitis, Gvidas Gedvilas, Gintaras Mačiulis |

| 4 November 2017 9 | Vytautas Prienai–Birštonas | 85–98 | Juventus Utena | Prienai |
| 17:20 (EET) | Scoring by quarter: 20–9, 18–14, 16–15, 23–30 |
| | Pts: T. Dimša 17; Rebs: Žukauskas 6 Asts: Žukauskas 6 | Report | Pts: Ireland 24; Rebs: Kupšas 7 Asts: Šikšnius 4 | Arena: Prienai Arena; Attendance: 350; Referees: Artūras Šukys, Mindaugas Večerskis, Martynas Gudas |

| 11 November 2017 10 | Vytautas Prienai–Birštonas | 101–80 | Pieno žvaigždės Pasvalys | Prienai |
| 17:00 (EET) | Scoring by quarter: 23–12, 30–23, 25–25, 23–20 |
| | Pts: Linkevičius 22; Rebs: Žukauskas 12; Asts: Sinica 6 | Report | Pts: Bobrov 22; Rebs: Balashov 10; Asts: Bobrov 4 | Arena: Prienai Arena; Attendance: 320; Referees: Tomas Jasevičius, Andžej Urbanovič, Ignas Davainis |

| 18 November 2017 11 | Vytautas Prienai–Birštonas | 92–78 | Nevėžis Kėdainiai | Prienai |
| 17:00 (EET) | Scoring by quarter: 31–20, 17–24, 22–18, 22–16 |
| | Pts: Žukauskas 20; Rebs: Žukauskas 8 Asts: E. Dimša 7 | Report | Pts: Kuksiks 17; Rebs: Maldūnas 7 Asts: Grant 5 | Arena: Prienai Arena; Attendance: 300; Referees: Artūras Šukys, Mindaugas Večerskis, Rytis Sabas |

| 4 December 2017 12 | Dzūkija Alytus | 60–90 | Vytautas Prienai–Birštonas | Alytus |
| 19:00 (EET) | Scoring by quarter: 17–25, 16–20, 6–21, 21–24 |
| | Pts: Sušinskas 11; Rebs: Samac, Žalalis 5 Asts: Hernández 5 | Report | Pts: Sinica 17; Rebs: Skučas 11; Asts: Williams 8 | Arena: Alytus Arena; Attendance: 1,742; Referees: Jurgis Laurinavičius, Ignas Davainis, Mantas Butvilas |

| 9 December 2017 13 | Vytautas Prienai–Birštonas | 88–74 | Lietkabelis Panevėžys | Prienai |
| 17:20 (EET) | Scoring by quarter: 22–22, 18–19, 21–19, 27–14 |
| | Pts: Žukauskas 18; Rebs: Žukauskas 8 Asts: T. Dimša 5 | Report | Pts: Skučas 15; Rebs: Skučas 11; Asts: Williams 8 | Arena: Prienai Arena; Attendance: 500; Referees: Vilius Mačiulaitis, Juozas Barkauskas, Andžej Urbanovič |

| 16 December 2017 15 | Vytautas Prienai–Birštonas | 70–89 | Žalgiris Kaunas | Prienai |
| 17:00 (EET) | Scoring by quarter: 20–27, 12–12, 16–23, 22–27 |
| | Pts: Šeškus 19; Rebs: Miniotas 8 Asts: Maceina 5 | Report | Pts: Kavaliauskas 14; Rebs: Masiulis 8 Asts: Micić 6 | Arena: Prienai Arena; Attendance: 1,400; Referees: Gytis Vilius, Andrius Maleckas, Martynas Gudas |

| 27 December 2017 16 | Neptūnas Klaipėda | 104–83 | Vytautas Prienai–Birštonas | Klaipėda |
| 18:50 (EET) | Scoring by quarter: 26–23, 27–21, 26–21, 25–18 |
| | Pts: Galdikas 18; Rebs: Galdikas 8 Asts: Kisielius, Seibutis, Želionis 5 | Report | Pts: Linkevičius, Šeškus 18; Rebs: Linkevičius, Miniotas 8 Asts: Sinica 4 | Arena: Švyturys Arena; Attendance: 2,550; Referees: Tomas Jasevičius, Gintaras Vitkauskas, Žydrūnas Paliušis |

| 2 January 2018 17 | Šiauliai | 79–73 | Vytautas Prienai–Birštonas | Šiauliai |
| 18:30 (EET) | Scoring by quarter: 16–13, 22–10, 21–19, 20–31 |
| | Pts: Birutis 20; Rebs: Sabeckis 10; Asts: Wright 5 | Report | Pts: Miniotas 16; Rebs: Miniotas 9 Asts: Šeškus, Sinica 3 | Arena: Šiauliai Arena; Attendance: 2,550; Referees: Jurgis Laurinavičius, Juozas Barkauskas, Ignas Davainis |

| 6 January 2018 18 | Lietuvos rytas Vilnius | 113–56 | Vytautas Prienai–Birštonas | Vilnius |
| 17:00 (EET) | Scoring by quarter: 31–11, 20–22, 36–15, 26–7 |
| | Pts: Girdžiūnas 21; Rebs: Echodas 13; Asts: Giedraitis 5 | Report | Pts: T. Dimša 17; Rebs: Miniotas 9 Asts: T. Dimša 3 | Arena: Lietuvos rytas Arena; Attendance: 2,550; Referees: Gytis Vilius, Mindaugas Večerskis, Mantas Butvilas |

| 13 January 2018 19 | Lietkabelis Panevėžys | 95–86 | Vytautas Prienai–Birštonas | Panevėžys |
| 17:20 (EET) | Scoring by quarter: 36–26, 18–15, 22–20, 19–25 |
| | Pts: Juškevičius 18; Rebs: D. Lavrinovič 7 Asts: Peiners 7 | Report | Pts: T. Dimša 26; Rebs: Miniotas 8 Asts: Miniotas 4 | Arena: Cido Arena; Attendance: 4,819; Referees: Artūras Šukys, Gvidas Gedvilas, Aurimas Borusas |

| 21 January 2018 20 | Vytautas Prienai–Birštonas | 93–116 | Pieno žvaigždės Pasvalys | Prienai |
| 19:30 (EET) | Scoring by quarter: 19–22, 14–19, 18–15, 29–18 |
| | Pts: Li. Ball 20; Rebs: Bristol 7 Asts: T. Dimša 6 | Report | Pts: Bobrov, Olisevičius 17; Rebs: Bobrov 9 Asts: Hughes 6 | Arena: Prienai Arena; Attendance: 1,100; Referees: Vilius Mačiulaitis, Andrius Maleckas, Gintaras Mačiulis |

| 27 January 2018 21 | Vytautas Prienai–Birštonas | 78–86 | Juventus Utena | Prienai |
| 19:30 (EET) | Scoring by quarter: 26–21, 17–20, 16–19, 19–26 |
| | Pts: Miniotas 14; Rebs: Miniotas 9 Asts: T. Dimša 5 | Report | Pts: Gaines 23; Rebs: Flowers 7 Asts: Gaines 4 | Arena: Prienai Arena; Attendance: 1,150; Referees: Šarūnas Gabrilavičius, Jurgis Laurinavičius, Mindaugas Večerskis |

| 4 February 2018 22 | Vytautas Prienai–Birštonas | 96–118 | Žalgiris Kaunas | Prienai |
| 17:20 (EET) | Scoring by quarter: 26–36, 17–26, 29–22, 24–34 |
| | Pts: Li. Ball 25; Rebs: Bristol 7 Asts: La. Ball 6 | Report | Pts: Masiulis 17; Rebs: Jankūnas 8 Asts: Udrih 8 | Arena: Prienai Arena; Attendance: 1,500; Referees: Tomas Jasevičius, Martynas Gudas, Rytis Sabas |

| 11 February 2018 23 | Šiauliai | 95–97 | Vytautas Prienai–Birštonas | Šiauliai |
| 15:00 (EET) | Scoring by quarter: 32–24, 19–23, 18–26, 26–24 |
| | Pts: Šarakauskas 23; Rebs: Šarakauskas 12; Asts: Sabeckis, Žemaitis 5 | Report | Pts: Lukashov 21; Rebs: Miniotas 7 Asts: Žukauskas 7 | Arena: Šiauliai Arena; Attendance: 3,800; Referees: Andrius Maleckas, Juozas Barkauskas, Oleg Barkovskij |

| 3 March 2018 24 | Vytautas Prienai–Birštonas | 76–83 | Lietuvos rytas Vilnius | Prienai |
| 17:20 (EET) | Scoring by quarter: 23–17, 20–30, 18–15, 15–21 |
| | Pts: Li. Ball 18; Rebs: Žukauskas 9 Asts: T. Dimša 5 | Report | Pts: Baron 20; Rebs: Echodas 6 Asts: Kramer 8 | Arena: Prienai Arena; Attendance: 1,200; Referees: Gintaras Vitkauskas, Martynas Gudas, Oleg Barkovskij |

| 10 March 2018 25 | Neptūnas Klaipėda | 73–65 | Vytautas Prienai–Birštonas | Klaipėda |
| 17:00 (EET) | Scoring by quarter: 24–7, 16–15, 15–21, 18–22 |
| | Pts: Šulskis 16; Rebs: Galdikas 9 Asts: Delininkaitis 4 | Report | Pts: Sinica 16; Rebs: Linkevičius 7 Asts: T. Dimša 4 | Arena: Švyturys Arena; Attendance: 5,100; Referees: Vilius Mačiulaitis, Gvidas Gedvilas, Mantas Butvilas |

| 19 March 2018 26 | Dzūkija Alytus | 82–79 | Vytautas Prienai–Birštonas | Alytus |
| 19:00 (EET) | Scoring by quarter: 19–18, 23–11, 24–21, 16–29 |
| | Pts: Žalalis 16; Rebs: Petrilevičius, Petty 8 Asts: Callison 5 | Report | Pts: Žukauskas 21; Rebs: Žukauskas 11; Asts: Linkevičius 4 | Arena: Alytus Arena; Attendance: 2,896; Referees: Gytis Vilius, Andrius Maleckas, Andžej Urbanovič |

| 25 March 2018 27 | Vytautas Prienai–Birštonas | 77–90 | Nevėžis Kėdainiai | Prienai |
| 15:00 (EET) | Scoring by quarter: 25–22, 23–22, 13–20, 16–26 |
| | Pts: Li. Ball 28; Rebs: Bristol, Žukauskas 9 Asts: Broadus 6 | Report | Pts: Tamulis 17; Rebs: Maldūnas 13; Asts: Normantas, Tamulis 8 | Arena: Prienai Arena; Attendance: 800; Referees: Jurgis Laurinavičius, Gvidas Gedvilas, Juozas Barkauskas |

| 31 March 2018 28 | Vytautas Prienai–Birštonas | 76–91 | Lietkabelis Panevėžys | Prienai |
| 16:30 (EET) | Scoring by quarter: 25–22, 23–22, 13–20, 16–26 |
| | Pts: Žukauskas 14; Rebs: T. Dimša 5 Asts: Broadus, T. Dimša, Žukauskas 3 | Report | Pts: Čepukaitis 16; Rebs: D. Lavrinovič 9 Asts: Mavra 6 | Arena: Prienai Arena; Attendance: 1,000; Referees: Tomas Jasevičius, Mindaugas Večerskis, Žydrūnas Paliušis |

| 7 April 2018 29 | Lietuvos rytas Vilnius | 104–71 | Vytautas Prienai–Birštonas | Vilnius |
| 17:20 (EET) | Scoring by quarter: 23–21, 34–22, 28–17, 19–11 |
| | Pts: Peterson 19; Rebs: Mockevičius 9 Asts: Kramer 8 | Report | Pts: Li. Ball 16; Rebs: Li. Ball 6 Asts: Žukauskas 6 | Arena: Lietuvos rytas Arena; Attendance: 1,950; Referees: Tomas Jasevičius, Martynas Gudas, Ignas Davainis |

| 12 April 2018 30 | Nevėžis Kėdainiai | vs. | Vytautas Prienai–Birštonas | Kėdainiai |
| 18:50 (EET) |
| | | | | Arena: Kėdainiai Arena |

| 15 April 2018 31 | Vytautas Prienai–Birštonas | vs. | Dzūkija Alytus | Prienai |
| 19:15 (EET) |
| | | | | Arena: Prienai Arena |

| 19 April 2018 31 | Juventus Utena | vs. | Vytautas Prienai–Birštonas | Utena |
| 18:45 (EET) |
| | | | | Arena: Utena Arena |

| 25 April 2018 32 | Vytautas Prienai–Birštonas | vs. | Šiauliai | Prienai |
| 18:50 (EET) |
| | | | | Arena: Prienai Arena |

| 28 April 2018 33 | Vytautas Prienai–Birštonas | vs. | Neptūnas Klaipėda | Prienai |
| 17:20 (EET) |
| | | | | Arena: Prienai Arena |

| 2 May 2018 34 | Pieno žvaigždės Pasvalys | vs. | Vytautas Prienai–Birštonas | Pasvalys |
| 18:00 (EET) |
| | | | | Arena: Pasvalys Pieno žvaigždės Arena |

| 9 May 2018 35 | Žalgiris Kaunas | vs. | Vytautas Prienai–Birštonas | Kaunas |
| 18:50 (EET) |
| | | | | Arena: Kaunas Sports Hall |

=== Baltic Basketball League ===
Vytautas forfeited a game on October 31, 2017, against Rapla after head coach Virginijus Šeškus received a second technical foul with three minutes left in regulation and refused to let his team continue playing. The Baltic Basketball League assessed Vytautas with a technical loss of 20–0 and fined the team €3,000. On January 6, 2018, after playing six games in the BBL, Vytautas withdrew from the 2017–18 season. In its place, the team set up the Big Baller Brand Challenge Games, a series of five friendly games designed to feature LaMelo and LiAngelo Ball in their professional debuts. However, Vytautas was assessed a €5,000 fine for forfeiting a non-televised game against Tsmoki-Minsk. They were disqualified from the BBL, with the results of previous games being nullified, for their second forfeit of the season.

==== Matches ====
| 25 October 2017 1 | Vytautas Prienai–Birštonas (Lithuania) | 91–56 | (Belarus) Tsmoki-Minsk | Prienai |
| | Scoring by quarter: 26–15, 21–9, 23–14, 21–18 |
| | Pts: Linkevičius 19; Rebs: Linkevičius 10; Asts: Žukauskas 5 | Report | Pts: Beliankou 15; Rebs: Rubinshteyn 4 Asts: Beliankou, Rubinshteyn 2 | Arena: Prienai Arena; Referees: Ignas Davainis, Rytis Sabas, Andzej Urbanovic |

| 31 October 2017 2 | Rapla (Estonia) | 20–0 (forfeit) | (Lithuania) Vytautas Prienai–Birštonas | Rapla |
| | | Report | | Arena: Sadolin Sports Hall |

| 8 November 2017 3 | Vytautas Prienai–Birštonas (Lithuania) | 87–60 | (Latvia) Liepājas Lauvas | Prienai |
| | Scoring by quarter: 25–18, 15–14, 26–11, 21–17 |
| | Pts: Sinica 22; Rebs: E. Dimša, Linkevičius 8 Asts: E. Šeškus 6 | Report | Pts: Apsitis 13; Rebs: Benjamin 9 Asts: Leimanis 5 | Arena: Prienai Arena; Attendance: 100; Referees: Sarunas Gabrilavicius, Juozas Barkauskas, Mantas Butvilas |

| 15 November 2017 4 | Šiauliai (Lithuania) | 79–82 | (Lithuania) Vytautas Prienai–Birštonas | Šiauliai |
| | Scoring by quarter: 18–20, 24–24, 22–20, 15–18 |
| | Pts: Urbutis 26; Rebs: Urbutis 11; Asts: Prewitt, Sabeckis, Wright 4 | Report | Pts: T. Dimša 20; Rebs: E. Dimša 9 Asts: T. Dimša 4 | Arena: Šiauliai Arena; Referees: Andrius Maleckas, Zydrunas Paliusis, Oleg Barkovskij |

| 20 December 2017 5 | Jūrmala (Latvia) | 80–58 | (Lithuania) Vytautas Prienai–Birštonas | Jelgava |
| | Scoring by quarter: 11–10, 25–16, 17–12, 27–20 |
| | Pts: Žvīgurs 16; Rebs: Krestinin, Strēlnieks 7 Asts: Jeromanovs, Krestinin 6 | Report | Pts: Šeškus 18; Rebs: Miniotas 8 Asts: Ivanauskas 5 | Arena: Zemgale Olympic Center; Attendance: 200; Referees: Gatis Salins, Andris Petrovs, Andris Vaskāns |

| 23 December 2017 6 | Vytautas Prienai–Birštonas (Lithuania) | 82–88 | (Lithuania) Šiauliai | Prienai |
| | Scoring by quarter: 26–21, 18–25, 22–27, 16–15 |
| | Pts: Šeškus 24; Rebs: Linkevičius 6 Asts: Lukashov, Maceina 5 | Report | Pts: Birutis 21; Rebs: Wright 10; Asts: Sabeckis 6 | Arena: Prienai Arena; Attendance: 200; Referees: Arturas Sukys, Sarunas Gabrilavicius, Juozas Barkauskas |

=== Basketball Champions League ===
==== Qualification ====
| 19 September 2017 1st leg | Donar Groningen (Netherlands) | 75–77 | (Lithuania) Vytautas Prienai–Birštonas | Groningen |
| | Scoring by quarter: 23–14, 13–25, 22–21, 17–17 |
| | Pts: Bruinsma 14; Rebs: Koenis 6 Asts: Dourisseau 5 | Report | Pts: E. Dimša 24; Rebs: E. Dimša 6 Asts: Ivanauskas 6 | Arena: MartiniPlaza |

| 21 September 2017 2nd leg | Vytautas Prienai–Birštonas (Lithuania) | 61–84 | (Netherlands) Donar Groningen | Prienai |
| | Scoring by quarter: 14–26, 10–25, 22–18, 15–15 |
| | Pts: Tinsley 14; Rebs: Žukauskas 6 Asts: Ivanauskas 3 | Report | Pts: Curry 20; Rebs: Koenis 9 Asts: Curry 8 | Arena: Prienai Arena |

== Individual awards ==
=== Lithuanian Basketball League ===
Player of the Week

| Date | Player | Efficiency | Ref. |
|---|---|---|---|
| 13 November 2017 | (Lithuania) Martynas Linkevičius | 27 | |
| 15 January 2018 | (Lithuania) Tomas Dimša | 30 | |
