= Big Baller Brand Challenge Games =

Basketball competition in Lithuania

- Date: January 9–29, 2018
- Duration: 20 days
- Venue: Prienai Arena
- Location: Prienai, Lithuania; 54°38′52″N 23°57′41″E
- Patrons: Big Baller Brand; Ballislife.com; Facebook
- Organised by: Vytautas Prienai–Birštonas
- Participants: 6 teams

Big Baller Brand Challenge Games were a series of friendly basketball games between Vytautas Prienai–Birštonas of the Lithuanian Basketball League (LKL) and five teams in the LKL, National Basketball League (NKL), and Regional Basketball League (RKL). It began on January 9 and ended on January 28, 2018. The games were designed by Vytautas to give more exposure to its new signees, brothers LaMelo and LiAngelo Ball, and resulted in the team's withdrawal from the 2017–18 Baltic Basketball League season. The games were sponsored by Big Baller Brand, an athletic apparel company founded by the brothers' father LaVar Ball, and were streamed on Facebook Live via Ballislife Weekly Showcase.

Vytautas won all five games of the exhibition series, and five of its players earned the game's most valuable player honors. Official head coach Virginijus Šeškus coached the team in its first four games, with LaVar Ball being named assistant coach in the fourth game against Dzūkija Alytus. Ball was appointed head coach for the team's final game against Jonava. Under Ball's coaching, LaMelo and LiAngelo Ball played increased minutes and had their top performances of the Big Baller Brand Challenge Games, with the former scoring an event-high 43 points in the fourth game and recording a triple-double in the last game of the event.

== History ==
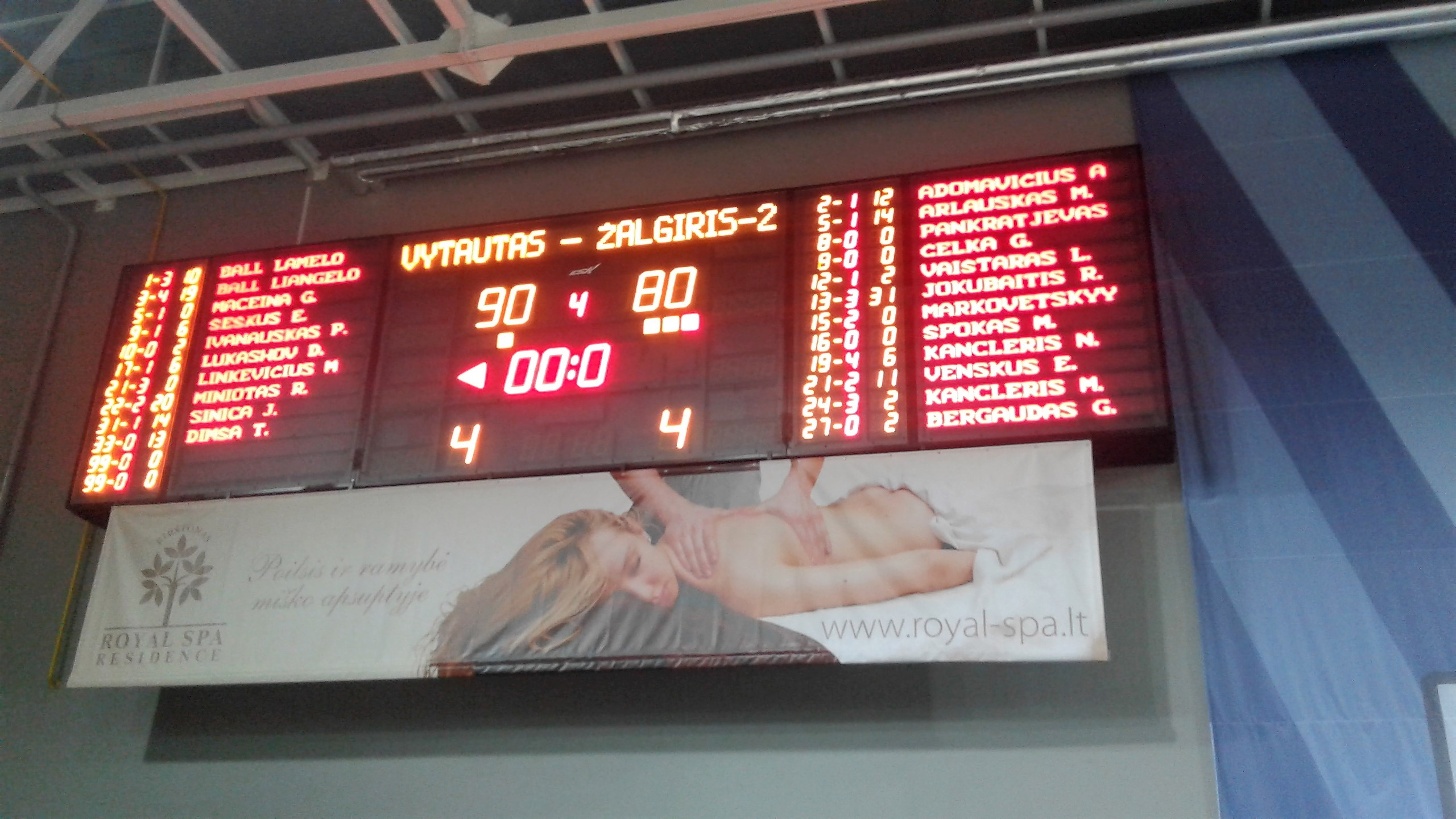
The scoreboard at the opening exhibition game between Vytautas and Žalgiris-2.

On December 11, 2017, Vytautas Prienai–Birštonas signed LaMelo and LiAngelo Ball, whose brother Lonzo Ball competes for the Los Angeles Lakers of the National Basketball Association (NBA). Their father LaVar Ball, owner of the athletic apparel company Big Baller Brand, also rose to fame earlier in the year as a media personality. Before their signings, the Ball brothers were involved with controversy relating to their previous schools, with LaMelo being pulled out of Chino Hills High School by his father during his junior year in October 2017 and LiAngelo being arrested in China on November 10 before dropping out of UCLA altogether a month later. The signing immediately drew attention from major sports media outlets, including ESPN, Yahoo Sports, and Sports Illustrated. LaMelo also became the youngest American to sign a professional basketball contract overseas.

On January 5, 2018, shortly after the Ball brothers' arrival in Lithuania, Vytautas announced that they would participate in the newly formed Big Baller Brand Challenge Games to give the brothers more playing time. The decision led to the team's withdrawal from the Baltic Basketball League (BBL) for the 2017–18 season. In the challenge, the team would mostly face teams in the National Basketball League, the second-best league in Lithuania. Games were streamed live on the Facebook page of Ballislife Weekly Showcase. The most valuable player (MVP) of each game would be rewarded with $2,000 USD and a pair of ZO2 shoes from Big Baller Brand; that honor would not be named towards either LiAngelo or LaMelo Ball due to their own affiliations to the Big Baller Brand, nor would the honor be given to a previous player who was named MVP earlier in the event.

== Teams ==
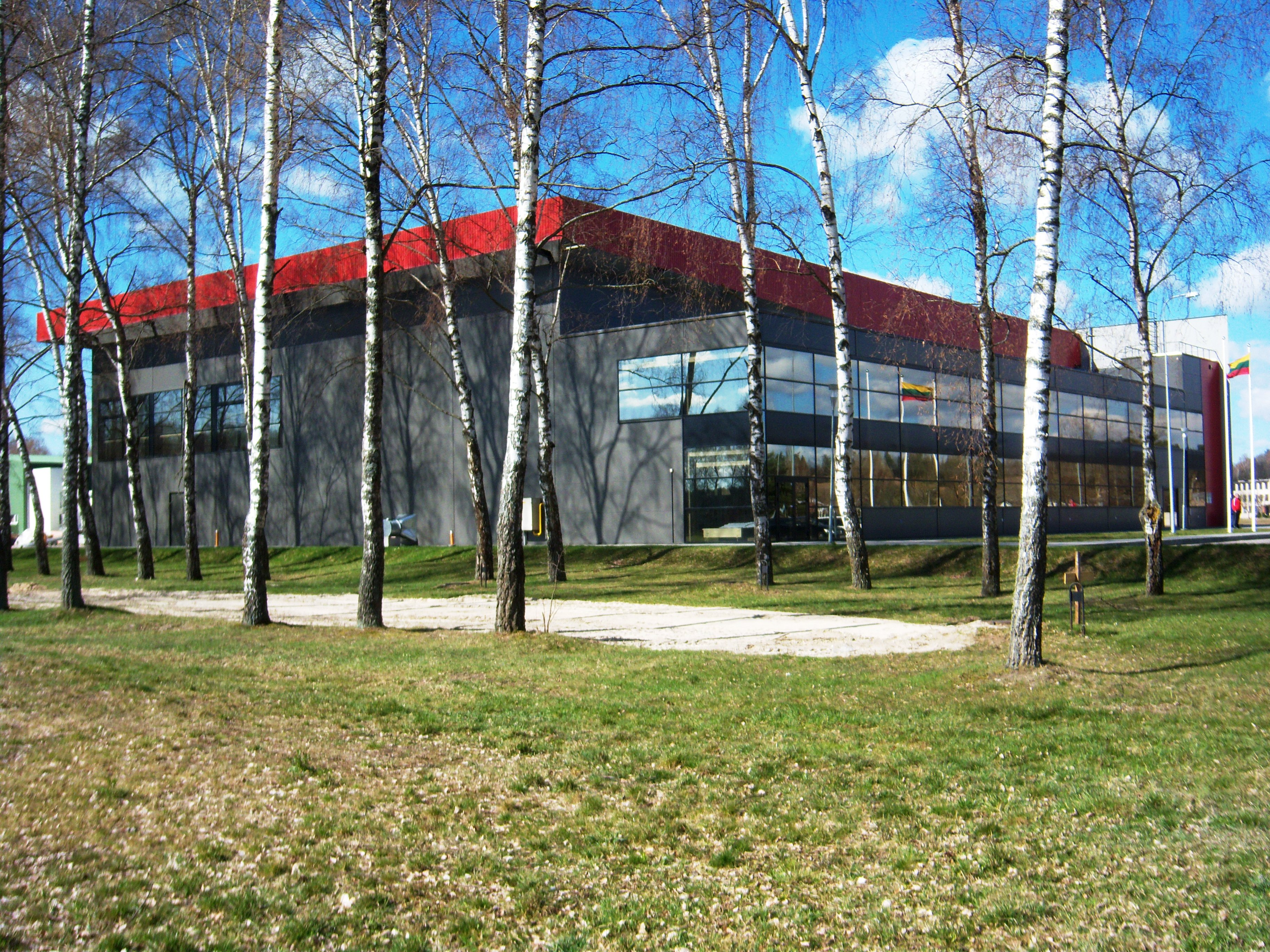
The Big Baller Brand Challenge Games were held in Prienai Arena (pictured) in Prienai, Lithuania.

Team	League (2017–18)
Dzūkija Alytus	Lithuanian Basketball League
Jonava	National Basketball League
Lietuvos-rytas-2 Vilnius	Regional Basketball League
Vytautas Prienai–Birštonas	Lithuanian Basketball League
Vytis Šakiai	National Basketball League
Žalgiris-2 Kaunas	National Basketball League

== Games ==
=== Vytautas Prienai–Birštonas vs. Žalgiris-2 Kaunas ===
In the opening game of the Big Baller Brand Challenge Games, Vytautas defeated Žalgiris-2 Kaunas of the National Basketball League (NKL), the second-best in Lithuania, with a final score of 90–80. In their debut games for the club, LiAngelo Ball recorded 19 points and 3 rebounds as the starting shooting guard for Vytautas, while LaMelo Ball came off the bench that game to produce 10 points and a game-high 9 assists. Žalgiris-2, the reserve team to LKL powerhouse Žalgiris, chose to play with their under-18 players, most notably sidelining starting point guard Ignas Sargiunas. Rokas Jokubaitis of the visiting team led all scorers with 31 points on 13-of-24 shooting and was labeled "the top NBA prospect in the game" by Mike Schmitz of ESPN. However, Vytautas big man Regimantas Miniotas, who recorded 20 points and 13 rebounds, was named most valuable player (MVP) and earned the rewards from Big Baller Brand. Business Insider remarked that "the real star of the show was the Big Baller Brand" due to its heavy advertisement during the game. About 1.6 million people viewed the game on Facebook.

January 9, 2018	Vytautas Prienai–Birštonas (Lithuania)	90–80	(Lithuania) Žalgiris-2 Kaunas	Prienai, Lithuania
20:30 (EET)	Scoring by quarter: 19–16, 16–21, 31–17, 14–16
	Pts: Miniotas 20; Rebs: Miniotas 13; Asts: La. Ball 9	Boxscore	Pts: Jokubaitis 31; Rebs: Venskus 10; Asts: Arlauskas 3	Arena: Prienai Arena; Attendance: 1,500

Starters:			Pts	Reb	Ast
PG	17	(Ukraine) Denys Lukashov	6	1	4
SG	3	(United States) LiAngelo Ball	19	3	1
SF	9	(Lithuania) Edvinas Šeškus	6	2	2
PF	31	(Lithuania) Justas Sinica	14	7	3
C	22	(Lithuania) Regimantas Miniotas	20	13	1
Reserves:					
PG	1	(United States) LaMelo Ball	10	2	9
SG	33	(Lithuania) Tomas Dimša	13	1	8
SF	21	(Lithuania) Martynas Linkevičius	0	5	0
PG	10	(Lithuania) Paulius Ivanauskas	2	1	1
PG	5	(Lithuania) Gediminas Maceina	0	1	2
Head coach:
(Lithuanian Basketball Federation) Virginijus Šeškus

Vytautas Prienai–Birštonas	Žalgiris-2 Kaunas

Most valuable player
(Lithuania) Regimantas Miniotas

Starters:			Pts	Reb	Ast
PG	13	(Lithuania) Rokas Jokubaitis	31	1	1
SG	5	(Lithuania) Martynas Arlauskas	14	7	3
SF	12	(Lithuania) Laurynas Vaistaras	2	6	1
PF	27	(Lithuania) Giedrius Bergaudas	2	5	0
C	21	(Lithuania) Erikas Venskus	11	10	0
Reserves:					
PG	2	(Lithuania) Arnas Adomavičius	12	3	2
PF	18	(Lithuania) Nedas Kancleris	6	3	1
SG	24	(Lithuania) Modestas Kancleris	2	2	0
PG	8	(Lithuania) Nojus Pankratjevas	0	0	1
C	15	(Ukraine) Volodymyr Markovetskyy	0	0	0
SF	16	(Lithuania) Matas Spokas	0	0	0
Head coach:
(Lithuanian Basketball Federation) Tomas Masiulis

=== Vytautas Prienai–Birštonas vs. Lietuvos rytas-2 Vilnius ===
Vytautas won their second game of the event in a 130–93 blowout against the Lietuvos rytas-2 Vilnius of the Regional Basketball League (RKL), the third-best league in Lithuania. Lietuvos rytas-2, which exclusively featured players below the age of 18, is the junior team of the original Lietuvos rytas in the LKL. LaMelo and LiAngelo Ball led the game with 31 and 29 points respectively, with the former also recording nine assists and eight steals. For the Lietuvos rytas-2, Deividas Sirvydis scored a team-high 19 points and Ernestas Narusevičius had a double-double of 11 points and 11 rebounds. LaMelo Ball, who made his first start, drew attention in the United States for his failed attempt to throw himself an alley-oop off the backboard in the final minutes. Newly acquired Vytautas player Kervin Bristol, who contributed 17 points and seven rebounds, as well as several dunks, was named MVP that game.

January 15, 2018	Vytautas Prienai–Birštonas (Lithuania)	130–93	(Lithuania) Lietuvos-rytas-2 Vilnius	Prienai, Lithuania
20:30 (EET)	Scoring by quarter: 32–19, 32–22, 34–19, 32–33
	Pts: La. Ball 31; Rebs: Bristol 7 Asts: La. Ball 9	Boxscore	Pts: Sirvydis 19; Rebs: Naruševičius 11; Asts: Jermolajevas, Marčiulionis 3	Arena: Prienai Arena; Attendance: 1,200

Starters:			Pts	Reb	Ast
PG	1	(United States) LaMelo Ball	31	4	9
SG	3	(United States) LiAngelo Ball	29	3	4
SF	21	(Lithuania) Martynas Linkevičius	2	6	1
PF	31	(Lithuania) Justas Sinica	13	6	2
C	55	(Haiti) Kervin Bristol	17	7	0
Reserves:					
PF	22	(Lithuania) Regimantas Miniotas	19	5	3
PG	10	(Lithuania) Paulius Ivanauskas	0	4	5
PG	17	(Ukraine) Denys Lukashov	11	3	3
SF	9	(Lithuania) Edvinas Šeškus	3	1	2
SG	33	(Lithuania) Tomas Dimša	5	1	6
PG	5	(Lithuania) Gediminas Maceina	0	4	1
Head coach:
(Lithuanian Basketball Federation) Virginijus Šeškus

Vytautas Prienai–Birštonas	Lietuvos rytas-2 Vilnius

Most valuable player
(Haiti) Kervin Bristol

Starters:			Pts	Reb	Ast
PG	88	(Lithuania) Domantas Vilys	7	1	0
SG	1	(Lithuania) Gediminas Mokseckas	3	0	0
SF	0	(Lithuania) Deividas Sirvydis	19	7	1
PF	23	(Lithuania) Marek Blazevic	7	1	1
C	15	(Lithuania) Ernestas Narusevičius	11	11	1
Reserves:					
SG	5	(Lithuania) Mykolas Astrauskas	7	0	1
PG	7	(Lithuania) Simas Jarumbauskas	12	6	1
PG	13	(Lithuania) Augustas Marčiulionis	4	4	3
SG	17	(Lithuania) Tomas Pačėsas	2	1	1
PG	18	(Lithuania) Pijus Rimkus	5	2	2
SG	31	(Lithuania) Šarūnas Valunta	8	0	2
PF	31	(Lithuania) Erikas Jermolajevas	8	1	3
Head coach:
(Lithuanian Basketball Federation) Arvydas Gronskis

=== Vytautas Prienai–Birštonas vs. Vytis Šakiai ===
This match would be the closest of all the Big Baller Brand Challenge Games, with Vytautas coming from behind near the end of the third quarter to win 93–89 against Vytis Šakiai of the National Basketball League (NKL). LiAngelo Ball would lead all players in points scored with 22 points and 7 rebounds recorded, while LaMelo Ball recorded 14 points, 2 rebounds, and 2 assists that night. Kervin Bristol led the Vytautas in rebounds with 8 rebounds to go with the 14 points he scored. For the Vytis, they were primarily led by Brian Wanamaker and Marijus Užupis, who both led the team in points scored that night with 13 each. Užupis also led the Vytis in rebounds with 9 total, while Wanamaker tied with Rytis Juknevičius for assists with 6 each. Tomas Dimša would be named the MVP of the night for his overall game, which resulted in 11 points, 6 rebounds, and a game-high 8 assists for the Vytautas.

January 17, 2018	Vytautas Prienai–Birštonas (Lithuania)	93–89	(Lithuania) Vytis Šakiai	Prienai, Lithuania
21:00 (EET)	Scoring by quarter: 21–18, 22–28, 28–27, 22–16
	Pts: Li. Ball 22; Rebs: Bristol 8 Asts: Dimša 8	Boxscore	Pts: Užupis, Wanamaker 13; Rebs: Užupis 9 Asts: Juknevičius, Wanamaker 6	Arena: Prienai Arena; Attendance: 1,000

Starters:			Pts	Reb	Ast
PG	1	(United States) LaMelo Ball	14	2	2
SG	3	(United States) LiAngelo Ball	22	7	0
SF	21	(Lithuania) Tomas Dimša	11	6	8
PF	31	(Lithuania) Justas Sinica	10	5	3
C	55	(Haiti) Kervin Bristol	14	8	0
Reserves:					
PF	22	(Lithuania) Regimantas Miniotas	7	6	1
PG	17	(Ukraine) Denys Lukashov	5	3	5
SF	21	(Lithuania) Martynas Linkevičius	6	6	2
PG	5	(Lithuania) Gediminas Maceina	2	0	0
Head coach:
(Lithuanian Basketball Federation) Virginijus Šeškus

Vytautas Prienai–Birštonas	Vytis Šakiai

Most valuable player
(Lithuania) Tomas Dimša

Starters:			Pts	Reb	Ast
PG	3	(United States) Brian Wanamaker	13	7	6
SG	7	(Lithuania) Gytis Radzevičius	11	3	1
SF	5	(Lithuania) Šarūnas Vingelis	11	1	0
PF	13	(Lithuania) Marijus Užupis	13	9	1
C	24	(Lithuania) Aurelijus Pukelis	8	7	1
Reserves:					
SF	11	(Lithuania) Aurimas Majauskas	11	6	1
SG	13	(Lithuania) Rytis Juknevičius	10	5	6
SG	1	(Lithuania) Paulius Beliavičius	8	2	0
PF	12	(Lithuania) Justas Sakalauskas	4	2	1
SG	8	(Lithuania) Markas Užukauskas	0	0	0
Head coach:
(Lithuanian Basketball Federation) Aurimas Jasilionis

=== Vytautas Prienai–Birštonas vs. Dzūkija Alytus ===
In the penultimate game of the Big Baller Brand Challenge Games, Vytautas Prienai–Birštonas defeated LKL rivals Dzūkija Alytus with a final score of 147–142. Vytautas named LaVar Ball, father to the Ball brothers, as assistant coach for the game and gave him authority over many of the team's key decisions. Days before the match-up, Dzūkija parted ways with top scorer Katin Reinhardt, who signed with the Bosnian team Igokea. The game featured the best performances until that point in the event for both LaMelo and LiAngelo Ball, who both played all 40 minutes of the game. LaMelo recorded a game-high 43 points, 10 assists, and eight rebounds, while LiAngelo posted 37 points, eight rebounds, and five assists. Vytautas player Edvinas Šeškus, son of head coach Virginijus, was named most valuable player with a performance of 23 points, five rebounds, and five assists. Dzūkija were led by Paulius Petrilevičius, who scored 35 points and grabbed nine rebounds in 21 minutes. Gediminas Žalalis also recorded a double-double of 23 points and 11 rebounds for the visitors.

January 23, 2018	Vytautas Prienai–Birštonas (Lithuania)	147–142	(Lithuania) Dzūkija Alytus	Prienai, Lithuania
21:00 (EET)	Scoring by quarter: 34–37, 33–33, 40–37, 40–35
	Pts: La. Ball 43; Rebs: Miniotas 9 Asts: La. Ball 10	Boxscore	Pts: Petrilevičius 35; Rebs: Žalalis 11; Asts: Danisevičius 8	Arena: Prienai Arena; Attendance: 1,000

Starters:			Pts	Reb	Ast
PG	1	(United States) LaMelo Ball	43	8	10
SG	3	(United States) LiAngelo Ball	37	8	5
SF	21	(Lithuania) Edvinas Šeškus	23	5	5
PF	31	(Lithuania) Regimantas Miniotas	4	9	3
C	55	(Haiti) Kervin Bristol	13	6	0
Reserves:					
SF	21	(Lithuania) Martynas Linkevičius	16	7	2
PG	17	(Ukraine) Denys Lukashov	2	0	0
SG	10	(Lithuania) Paulius Ivanauskas	9	3	4
PF	31	(Lithuania) Justas Sinica	0	0	1
PG	5	(Lithuania) Gediminas Maceina	0	0	1
Head coach:
(Lithuanian Basketball Federation) Virginijus Šeškus

Vytautas Prienai–Birštonas	Dzūkija Alytus

Most valuable player
(Lithuania) Edvinas Šeškus

Starters:			Pts	Reb	Ast
PG	10	(United States) Charles Callison	16	6	5
SG	32	(Lithuania) Gediminas Navickas	4	3	7
SF	5	(Lithuania) Tomas Pačėsas	2	1	1
PF	14	(Lithuania) Paulius Petrilevičius	35	9	3
C	21	(Russia) Anatoly Kashirov	9	1	1
Reserves:					
SF	19	(Cyprus) Nikolaos Stylianou	23	6	2
PF	77	(Lithuania) Gediminas Žalalis	23	11	1
PG	11	(Lithuania) Paulius Danisevičius	9	1	8
SF	12	(Lithuania) Mindaugas Sušinskas	8	3	7
C	20	(Russia) Egor Gontarev	6	3	2
PG	3	(Lithuania) Martynas Pocevičius	7	2	2
Head coach:
(Basketball Federation of North Macedonia) Nikola Vasilev

=== Vytautas Prienai–Birštonas vs. Jonava ===
For the final game of the Big Baller Brand Challenge Games, LaVar Ball was promoted from assistant head coach to head coach for Vytautas, taking over coaching duties for Virginijus Šeškus that night as they blew out the competition, winning by the final score of 151–120 over BC Jonava of the National Basketball League (NKL). LaMelo Ball would end the event with a triple-double on display, recording 40 points, 11 rebounds, and 10 assists for Vytautas. Meanwhile, both LiAngelo Ball and Regimantas Miniotas wouldn't be far behind him themselves, with LiAngelo recording 31 points, 8 rebounds, and 5 assists and Miniotas recording 20 points, a game-high 17 rebounds, and 7 assists of his own. For Jonava, their main player of the game was Bryton Hobbs, who lead the entire team in all primary statistics with 30 points, 10 rebounds, and 8 assists. For the finale, the most valuable player of the game was given to Justas Sinica, who recorded 14 points, 8 rebounds, and 2 assists while coming off the bench for the team.

January 28, 2018	Vytautas Prienai–Birštonas (Lithuania)	151–120	(Lithuania) Jonava	Prienai, Lithuania
21:00 (EET)	Scoring by quarter: 32–22, 36–42, 49–31, 34–23
	Pts: La. Ball 40; Rebs: Miniotas 17; Asts: La. Ball 10		Pts: Hobbs 30; Rebs: Hobbs 10; Asts: Hobbs 8	Arena: Prienai Arena; Attendance: 1,000

Starters:			Pts	Reb	Ast
PG	1	(United States) LaMelo Ball	40	11	10
SG	3	(United States) LiAngelo Ball	31	8	5
SF	21	(Lithuania) Edvinas Šeškus	22	2	0
PF	31	(Lithuania) Regimantas Miniotas	20	17	7
C	55	(Haiti) Kervin Bristol	11	7	0
Reserves:					
PF	31	(Lithuania) Justas Sinica	14	8	2
SG	33	(Lithuania) Tomas Dimša	5	4	3
PG	7	(Lithuania) Bartas Aleksandravičius	6	2	0
PG	5	(Lithuania) Gediminas Maceina	2	3	3
Head coach:
(USA Basketball) LaVar Ball

Vytautas Prienai–Birštonas	Jonava

Most valuable player
(Lithuania) Justas Sinica

Starters:			Pts	Reb	Ast
PG	5	(United States) Bryton Hobbs	30	10	8
SG	29	(Lithuania) Dovydas Redikas	7	6	7
SF	8	(Nigeria) Ebuka Anyaorah	0	0	0
PF	14	(Lithuania) Tomas Miškinis	20	8	3
C	23	(China) Yu Heng	12	2	1
Reserves:					
C	9	(Lithuania) Martynas Pacevičius	16	4	1
PF	10	(Lithuania) Justas Vazalis	15	4	0
PG	1	(Lithuania) Lukas Grabauskas	4	3	5
SG	3	(Lithuania) Šarūnas Dambrauskas	5	2	2
C	11	(Lithuania) Karolis Šarukas	7	3	3
PF	22	(Lithuania) Antanas Montrimavičius	4	1	3
Head coach:
(Lithuanian Basketball Federation) Nerijus Zabarauskas

== See also ==
- Big Baller Brand International Tournament
