= Eurocup Basketball 2011–12 Regular Season Group C =

Standings and Results for Group C of the Regular Season phase of the 2011–12 Eurocup basketball tournament.

== Standings ==
Key to colors
Top two teams advance to Last 16

	Team	Pld	W	L	PF	PA	Diff
1.	(Czech Republic) Nymburk	6	5	1	498	424	+74
2.	(Greece) Aris	6	4	2	431	397	+34
3.	(Lithuania) Rūdupis	6	3	3	487	485	+2
4.	(Netherlands) GasTerra Flames	6	0	6	391	501	−110

== Fixtures and results ==
All times given below are in Central European Time.

=== Game 1 ===
15 November 2011
18:45

Report

Aris (Greece)	55–64	(Czech Republic) Nymburk
Scoring by quarter: 15–23, 16–14, 6–15, 18–12
Pts: three players 14; Rebs: Tsaldaris 5 Asts: Tsaldaris, Bogris 2		Pts: Pumprla 15; Rebs: Nečas 12; Asts: Simmons 6

Alexandreio Melathron, Thessaloniki
Attendance: 1,500
Referees: Murat Biricik (TUR), Petar Obradovic (BIH), Omer Esternon (ISR)

15 November 2011
19:30

Report

GasTerra Flames (Netherlands)	77–82	(Lithuania) Rūdupis
Scoring by quarter: 19–22, 11–21, 20–18, 27–21
Pts: Bell 18; Rebs: de Randamie, Dourisseau 9 Asts: five players 2		Pts: Orelik 22; Rebs: Želionis 11; Asts: Orelik 4

Martiniplaza, Groningen
Attendance: 2,380
Referees: Miguel Pérez Pérez (ESP), Dragan Neskovic (SRB), Marko Juras (SRB)

=== Game 2 ===
22 November 2011
18:00

Report

Rūdupis (Lithuania)	60–71	(Greece) Aris
Scoring by quarter: 14–11, 13–13, 12–25, 21–22
Pts: Juškevičius, Kuzminskas 11; Rebs: Šalenga 8 Asts: Šalenga 3		Pts: Muldrow 16; Rebs: Muldrow 6 Asts: Mavraides, James 3

Prienai Sports Hall, Prienai
Attendance: 1,200
Referees: Olegs Latisevs (LAT), Petri Mäntylä (FIN), Aare Halliko (EST)

22 November 2011
18:00

Report

Nymburk (Czech Republic)	93–60	(Netherlands) GasTerra Flames
Scoring by quarter: 17–20, 24–14, 24–21, 28–5
Pts: Abrams, Simmons 18; Rebs: Pumprla 8 Asts: Pumprla 5		Pts: Bell 18; Rebs: Wesby, Koenis 4 Asts: Voorn 3

ČEZ Aréna, Pardubice
Attendance: 1,538
Referees: Jakub Zamojski (POL), Andrej Lovsyn (SLO), Arnis Ozols (LAT)

=== Game 3 ===
29 November 2011
18:00

Report

Rūdupis (Lithuania)	79–91	(Czech Republic) Nymburk
Scoring by quarter: 15–24, 29–28, 19–16, 16–23
Pts: Želionis 18; Rebs: three players 6 Asts: Juškevičius 6		Pts: Benda 22; Rebs: Pumprla, Wilson 9 Asts: Lawrence 8

Prienai Sports Hall, Prienai
Attendance: 800
Referees: Andrej Jersan (SLO), Boris Shulga (UKR), Gentian Cici (ALB)

29 November 2011
19:30

Report

GasTerra Flames (Netherlands)	51–58	(Greece) Aris
Scoring by quarter: 9–9, 11–13, 9–19, 22–17
Pts: Dourisseau 19; Rebs: Dourisseau 7 Asts: Bell, Wyatt 3		Pts: Muldrow 14; Rebs: Muldrow 13; Asts: three players 2

Martiniplaza, Groningen
Attendance: 2,280
Referees: Sasa Pukl (SLO), Renaud Geller (BEL), Anna Cardus (ESP)

=== Game 4 ===
6 December 2011
18:00

Report

Nymburk (Czech Republic)	80–83	(Lithuania) Rūdupis
Scoring by quarter: 22–18, 13–23, 24–25, 21–17
Pts: Benda 24; Rebs: Pumprla, Naymick 8 Asts: Simmons 5		Pts: Kadžiulis 19; Rebs: Urbutis 11; Asts: Kadžiulis 5

ČEZ Aréna, Pardubice
Attendance: 805
Referees: Marek Cmikiewicz (POL), Roman Kolar (SLO), Igor Dragojevic (MNE)

6 December 2011
18:45

Report

Aris (Greece)	79–58	(Netherlands) GasTerra Flames
Scoring by quarter: 25–22, 23–11, 9–10, 22–15
Pts: Tapoutos 14; Rebs: Kerusch 8 Asts: James, Tsaldaris 3		Pts: Bell 17; Rebs: Wyatt 10; Asts: Dourisseau 3

Alexandreio Melathron, Thessaloniki
Attendance: 1,250
Referees: Recep Ankarali (TUR), Marius Ciulin (ROU), Aleksandar Milojevic (MKD)

=== Game 5 ===
13 December 2011
18:00

Report

Nymburk (Czech Republic)	78–72	(Greece) Aris
Scoring by quarter: 20–16, 14–15, 21–22, 23–19
Pts: Simmons 22; Rebs: Benda 13; Asts: Lawrence 4		Pts: James 28; Rebs: Tapoutos 11; Asts: James 4

ČEZ Aréna, Pardubice
Attendance: 1,652
Referees: Carmelo Paternico (ITA), Marcin Kowalski (POL), Arnis Ozols (LAT)

13 December 2011
18:00

Report

Rūdupis (Lithuania)	97–70	(Netherlands) GasTerra Flames
Scoring by quarter: 21–14, 24–22, 24–17, 28–17
Pts: Šalenga 15; Rebs: Šalenga 6 Asts: Šalenga 5		Pts: Bell, Wyatt 13; Rebs: de Randamie, Wyatt 4 Asts: Wesby 3

Prienai Sports Hall, Prienai
Attendance: 520
Referees: Apostolos Kalpakas (SWE), Petri Mäntylä (FIN), Lahdo Sharro (SWE)

=== Game 6 ===
20 December 2011
20:00

Report

GasTerra Flames (Netherlands)	75–92	(Czech Republic) Nymburk
Scoring by quarter: 12–23, 24–25, 14–19, 25–25
Pts: Bell 15; Rebs: Koenis 6 Asts: three players 3		Pts: Abrams 17; Rebs: Nečas, Naymick 6 Asts: Lawrence 8

Martiniplaza, Groningen
Attendance: 1,380
Referees: Rustu Nuran (TUR), Oskars Lucis (LAT), Sergey Zashchuk (UKR)

20 December 2011
20:00

Report

Aris (Greece)	96–86	(Lithuania) Rūdupis
Scoring by quarter: 20–20, 22–16, 23–24, 13–18
Pts: James 22; Rebs: Tapoutos 11; Asts: Tapoutos, James 4		Pts: Urbutis 20; Rebs: Sinica 7 Asts: Orelik 6

Alexandreio Melathron, Thessaloniki
Attendance: 3,900
Referees: Emilio Perez Pizarro (ESP), Marko Juras (SRB), Gianluca Mattioli (ITA)
