= 2014–15 LKL season =

22nd season of the top-tier level professional basketball league

LKL
- Season: 2014–15
- Duration: October 2014 – June 2015
- Games played: 220 (regular season)
- Teams: 11

Regular season
- Season MVP: (Lithuania) Antanas Kavaliauskas
- Relegated: Mažeikiai

Finals
- Champions: Žalgiris; 17th title
- Runners-up: Lietuvos rytas
- Finals MVP: (Lithuania) Artūras Milaknis

Statistical leaders
Points	(Lithuania) Rokas Giedraitis	15.2
Rebounds	(Lithuania) Giedrius Staniulis	7.4
Assists	(Lithuania) Martynas Gecevičius	4.2

Records
- Biggest home win: Neptūnas 110–64 Mažeikiai (27 September 2014)
- Biggest away win: Mažeikiai 47–95 Žalgiris (23 December 2014)
- Highest scoring: Šiauliai 110–97 Mažeikiai (4 October 2014)
- Winning streak: 23 games Žalgiris
- Losing streak: 25 games Mažeikiai
- Highest attendance: 10,840; Žalgiris 71–68 Lietuvos rytas (3 June 2015)
- Lowest attendance: 80; Prienai 77–94 Šiauliai (15 November 2014)
- Average attendance: 1,487

The 2014–15 Lietuvos krepšinio lyga was the 22nd season of the top-tier level professional basketball league of Lithuania, the Lietuvos krepšinio lyga (LKL). The season started in October 2014, and finished in June 2015.

Žalgiris won its 17th title, the fifth in a row.

== Competition format ==
=== Regular season ===
During the regular season, all teams played 40 games.

=== Playoff round ===
The top eight teams in the regular season round joined the playoffs in the quarterfinals, that were played in a best-of-three games format. The semifinals were also played in this format.

The final round was played between the two winners of the semifinals. The final series for the first place was played in a best-of-seven format, while the series for the third place was played in a best-of-five format.

== League table ==
Pos	Team	Pld	W	L	PF	PA	PD	Qualification or relegation
1	Žalgiris	40	36	4	3397	2737	+660	Qualification to playoffs
2	Lietuvos rytas	40	35	5	3574	2931	+643	Qualification to playoffs
3	Neptūnas	40	31	9	3415	3001	+414	Qualification to playoffs
4	Pieno žvaigždės	40	24	16	3357	3216	+141	Qualification to playoffs
5	Juventus	40	24	16	3012	2942	+70	Qualification to playoffs
6	Dzūkija	40	21	19	2999	2966	+33	Qualification to playoffs
7	Šiauliai	40	18	22	3309	3196	+113	Qualification to playoffs
8	Lietkabelis	40	11	29	3117	3390	−273	Qualification to playoffs
9	Prienai	40	7	33	2775	3362	−587	
10	Nevėžis	40	7	33	2904	3651	−747	
11	Mažeikiai	40	6	34	2808	3275	−467	Relegation to NKL

Source: LKL

== Results ==
Home \ Away	DZŪ	JUV	LTK	LRY	MAŽ	NEP	NEV	PŽV	PRI	ŠIA	ŽAL	DZŪ	JUV	LTK	LRY	MAŽ	NEP	NEV	PŽV	PRI	ŠIA	ŽAL
Dzūkija	—	57–59	75–68	73–86	74–53	75–91	98–62	74–95	61–56	84–77	76–81	—	75–70	84–76	66–78	70–61	66–72	83–78	72–77	101–74	79–51	75–78
Juventus	71–63	—	78–61	56–77	72–66	79–85	75–63	78–85	82–74	86–84	75–76	72–77	—	77–73	70–78	75–77	77–71	81–69	62–74	68–53	67–61	68–73
Lietkabelis	64–86	79–84	—	69–97	76–67	65–78	97–67	78–86	89–68	89–85	70–88	66–70	64–77	—	79–101	84–98	81–83	88–71	78–95	76–74	84–101	63–82
Lietuvos rytas	87–71	76–61	90–61	—	88–80	90–94	98–74	85–87	91–61	98–92	82–84	118–76	79–76	101–95	—	76–70	84–75	119–76	84–76	99–71	89–71	93–66
Mažeikiai	72–87	73–84	66–71	74–87	—	69–81	75–83	66–84	60–67	60–69	47–95	55–61	60–71	88–89	60–83	—	59–71	76–75	77–82	70–62	81–90	65–96
Neptūnas	82–72	84–73	98–86	65–73	110–64	—	115–76	110–84	92–76	70–68	76–80	62–70	69–71	102–76	86–87	95–77	—	106–78	89–97	98–59	90–77	67–65
Nevėžis	60–81	86–112	72–102	59–95	69–65	73–116	—	88–94	64–78	62–87	59–93	69–93	82–87	87–84	52–96	82–98	85–88	—	92–83	69–63	83–88	74–112
Pieno žvaigždės	99–89	89–91	94–82	69–87	78–68	70–86	84–95	—	85–74	77–90	72–88	72–59	89–64	86–75	81–87	107–67	64–68	99–70	—	87–61	99–97	56–74
Prienai	60–74	56–91	88–81	66–97	84–67	73–88	79–70	85–83	—	77–94	73–89	76–75	67–76	79–87	59–84	77–88	63–86	75–87	91–93	—	50–87	57–94
Šiauliai	93–96	90–81	78–98	72–88	110–97	80–90	108–64	91–74	93–87	—	58–89	77–51	76–77	96–58	85–108	86–61	67–88	109–74	81–84	92–61	—	62–79
Žalgiris	83–73	75–76	91–83	91–77	98–79	86–48	79–52	82–78	87–58	80–71	—	85–57	76–62	102–72	82–81	76–52	86–90	92–53	81–79	97–63	86–65	—

Legend: Blue = home team win; Red = away team win.

== Playoffs ==
Quarterfinals
Žalgiris	91	73	99
Lietkabelis	69	67	60
Pieno žvaigždės	71	84	51	83	61
Juventus	77	74	63	80	69
Lietuvos rytas	97	107	96
Šiauliai	69	96	92
Neptūnas	88	56	71	69
Dzūkija	59	65	47	55

Semifinals
Žalgiris	81	91	96
Juventus	53	58	49
Lietuvos rytas	88	101	96	92
Neptūnas	79	107	89	87

Finals
Žalgiris	73	78	71	85
Lietuvos rytas	66	62	68	77

Third place
Juventus	75	76	75	61	84
Neptūnas	88	66	64	66	69

== Awards ==
=== Players of the week ===
Week	Name	Team	Efficiency
Sept. 24 – Sept. 28	(United States) Mustafa Shakur	Neptūnas	20.0 (2 games)
Sept. 29 – Oct. 5	(United States) Rashaun Broadus	Juventus	15.3 (3 games)
Oct. 6 – Oct. 12	(Lithuania) Antanas Kavaliauskas	Lietuvos rytas	22.3 (3 games)
Oct. 13 – Oct. 19	(United States) Noah Dahlman	Lietkabelis	24.5 (2 games)
Oct. 20 – Oct. 26	(Lithuania) Artūras Jomantas	Dzūkija	32.0 (1 game)
Oct. 27 – Nov. 2	(Bosnia and Herzegovina) Miralem Halilović	Dzūkija	27.0 (1 game)
Nov. 3 – Nov. 9	(Lithuania) Gediminas Orelikas	Lietuvos rytas	27.0 (1 game)
Nov. 10 – Nov. 16	(Lithuania) Osvaldas Olisevičius	Pieno žvaigždės	27.0 (1 game)
Nov. 17 – Nov. 23	(Lithuania) Adas Juškevičius	Lietuvos rytas	24.5 (2 games)
Nov. 24 – Nov. 30	(United States) Rashaun Broadus	Juventus	21.0 (2 games)
Dec. 1 – Dec. 7	(Lithuania) Robertas Javtokas	Žalgiris	19.5 (2 games)
Dec. 8 – Dec. 14	(United States) Jonathan Lee	Šiauliai	35.0 (1 game)
Dec. 15 – Dec. 21	(Lithuania) Evaldas Kairys	Pieno žvaigždės	20.0 (2 games)
Dec. 22 – Dec. 28	(Lithuania) Deividas Gailius	Neptūnas	23.0 (1 game)
Dec. 29 – Jan. 4	(Lithuania) Gediminas Orelikas	Lietuvos rytas	34.0 (1 game)
Jan. 5 – Jan. 11	(Lithuania) Egidijus Dimša	Pieno žvaigždės	28.0 (1 game)
Jan. 12 – Jan. 18	(United States) James Anderson	Žalgiris	17.0 (2 games)
Jan. 19 – Jan. 25	(Lithuania) Evaldas Žabas	Lietkabelis	41.0 (1 game)
Jan. 26 – Feb. 1	(Lithuania) Giedrius Staniulis	Mažeikiai	25.0 (1 game)
Feb. 2 – Feb. 8	(United States) James Anderson	Žalgiris	25.0 (2 games)
Feb. 9 – Feb. 15	(Lithuania) Justas Tamulis	Nevėžis	16.0 (2 games)
Feb. 16 – Feb. 22	(Lithuania) Paulius Dambrauskas	Dzūkija	22.0 (1 game)
Feb. 23 – Mar. 1	(Lithuania) Deividas Gailius	Neptūnas	26.0 (2 games)
Mar. 2 – Mar. 8	(United States) Jeffery Allen	Šiauliai	31.0 (1 game)
Mar. 9 – Mar. 15	(Lithuania) Martynas Gecevičius	Lietuvos rytas	28.0 (1 game)
Mar. 16 – Mar. 22	(Lithuania) Rokas Giedraitis	Šiauliai	29.0 (2 games)
Mar. 23 – Mar. 29	(Lithuania) Antanas Kavaliauskas	Lietuvos rytas	17.0 (2 games)
Mar. 30 – Apr. 5	(Lithuania) Gytis Sirutavičius	Pieno žvaigždės	23.0 (2 games)
Apr. 6 – Apr. 12	(United States) James Anderson	Žalgiris	37.0 (1 game)
Apr. 13 – Apr. 19	(Lithuania) Martynas Linkevičius	Prienai	21.0 (2 games)
Apr. 20 – Apr. 26	(Lithuania) Darius Tarvydas	Mažeikiai	22.3 (3 games)

=== Playoff MVPs ===
Game	Name	Team	Efficiency
Quarterfinals
1	(United States) Rashaun Broadus	Juventus	26
2	(Lithuania) Evaldas Žabas	Lietkabelis	36
3	(Lithuania) Martynas Gecevičius	Lietuvos rytas	27
4	(Lithuania) Laimonas Kisielius	Pieno žvaigždės	35
5	(Lithuania) Arvydas Šikšnius	Juventus	21
Finals
–	(Lithuania) Artūras Milaknis	Žalgiris	13.8

=== Players of the month ===
- October: (Lithuania) Gediminas Orelikas (Lietuvos rytas)
- November: (United States) Rashaun Broadus (Juventus)
- December: (United States) Jonathan Lee (Šiauliai)
- January: (United States) Alex Oriakhi (Pieno žvaigždės)
- February: (Lithuania) Antanas Kavaliauskas (Lietuvos rytas)
- March: (Lithuania) Rokas Giedraitis (Šiauliai)
- April: (Lithuania) Gytis Sirutavičius (Pieno žvaigždės)

== Statistics ==
Points

Rank	Name	G	Pts	PPG
1	(Lithuania) Rokas Giedraitis	43	654	15.2
2	(Lithuania) Evaldas Žabas	41	586	14.3
3	(Lithuania) Gediminas Orelikas	51	705	13.8
4	(United States) Michael Dixon, Jr	39	534	13.7
5	(United States) Rashaun Broadus	51	690	13.5

Rebounds

Rank	Name	G	Reb	RPG
1	(Lithuania) Giedrius Staniulis	27	199	7.4
2	(Lithuania) Martynas Linkevičius	39	265	6.8
3	(Lithuania) Arnas Labuckas	42	284	6.8
4	(United States) Alex Oriakhi	42	271	6.5
5	(Lithuania) Artūras Jomantas	40	254	6.3

Assists

Rank	Name	G	Ast	APG
1	(Lithuania) Martynas Gecevičius	51	214	4.2
2	(Lithuania) Paulius Ivanauskas	40	161	4.0
3	(Lithuania) Žygimantas Janavičius	46	179	3.9
4	(United States) Rashaun Broadus	51	195	3.8
5	(Lithuania) Rolandas Alijevas	40	152	3.8
