= Regimantas =

- Gender: Male
- Name day: 25 February

Origin
- Region of origin: Lithuania

Regimantas is a Lithuanian masculine given name. Individuals bearing the name Regimantas include:

- Regimantas Adomaitis (born 1937), Lithuanian actor
- Regimantas Miniotas (born 1996), Lithuanian basketball player
