= Maceina =

- Lithuanian surname
- m.: Maceina
- f.: (unmarried): Maceinaitė
- f.: (married): Maceinienė

Maceina is a Lithuanian surname. Most probasbly the suffix '-eina' or '-na' is appended to the stem "Mac-' from the given name "Macys" or Polish "Maciej", Matthew. Notable people wit the surname include:

- Antanas Maceina (1908–1987), Lithuanian philosopher, existentialist, educator, theologian, and poet
- Gediminas Maceina (born 1984), Lithuanian basketball player
- Tatjana Maceinienė (1941–2025), Lithuanian writer, essayist, translator
