= Eigirdas Žukauskas =

Lithuanian basketball player (born 1992)

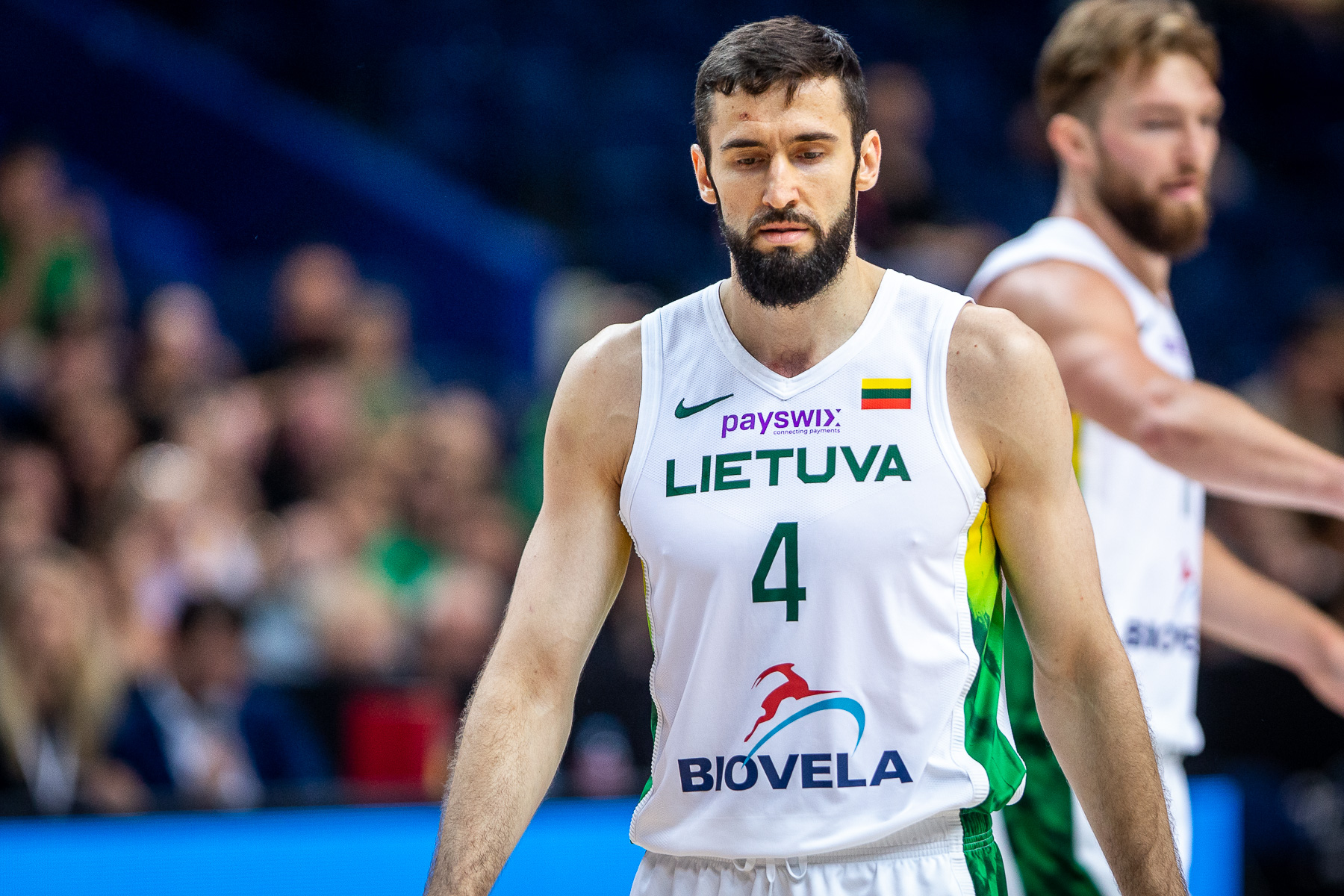
- Žukauskas with the senior Lithuania national team

Derthona Basket
- Position: Power forward / small forward

Personal information
- Born: 3 June 1992 (age 33) Radviliškis, Lithuania
- Listed height: 6 ft 9 in (2.06 m)
- Listed weight: 229 lb (104 kg)

Career information
- Playing career: 2010–present

Career history
- 2010–2011: Anykščių Puntukas
- 2011-2012: Statyba Vilnius
- 2012: Radviliškis
- 2012–2014: Šiauliai
- 2013: →Mažeikiai
- 2014: →Dzūkija
- 2014–2015: Mažeikiai
- 2015–2016: JSA Bordeaux
- 2016–2017: Saint-Chamond
- 2017–2018: Vytautas Prienai-Birštonas
- 2018–2022: Parma
- 2022: Tofaş
- 2022–2024: Wolves Vilnius
- 2024–2025: Aquila Trento
- 2025–present: Derthona

Career highlights
- Italian Cup winner (2025)

Eigirdas Žukauskas (born 3 June 1992) is a Lithuanian professional basketball player who last played for Dolomiti Energia Trento of the Italian Lega Basket Serie A (LBA). Žukauskas plays both the Power forward and small forward positions.

== Professional career ==
A native of Radviliškis, he has competed with various teams in Lithuania and France.

On 7 March 2022 he signed with Tofaş of the Turkish BSL.

On 22 July 2022 he signed with BC Wolves of the Lithuanian Basketball League.

On July 27, 2024, he signed with Dolomiti Energia Trento of the Italian Lega Basket Serie A (LBA).
