= Rytis Juknevičius =

Lithuanian basketball player (born 1993)

Sūduva-Mantinga
- Position: Point guard
- League: National Basketball League

Personal information
- Born: December 15, 1993 (age 32) Kaunas, Lithuania
- Listed height: 187 cm (6.14 ft)
- Listed weight: 75 kg (165 lb)

Career information
- NBA draft: 2015: undrafted
- Playing career: 2010–present

Career history
- 2010–2013: Triobet Jonava
- 2013–2014: BC Trakai
- 2014–2015: Dzūkija Alytus
- 2015-2016: JSA Bordeaux Basket
- 2016–2017: Sūduva-Mantinga Marijampolė
- 2017: Nevėžis Kėdainiai
- 2017-2018: Vytis Šakiai
- 2018-2019: Sintek-Jonava
- 2019-present: Sūduva-Mantinga Marijampolė

Career highlights
- NKL champion (2017)

Rytis Juknevičius (born December 15, 1993) is a professional Lithuanian basketball player. He plays the point guard position.

== International career ==
Juknevičius represented Lithuania men's national under-20 basketball team during the 2013 FIBA Europe Under-20 Championship in Tallinn, Estonia.
