= Gediminas Žalalis =

Lithuanian basketball player (born 1995)

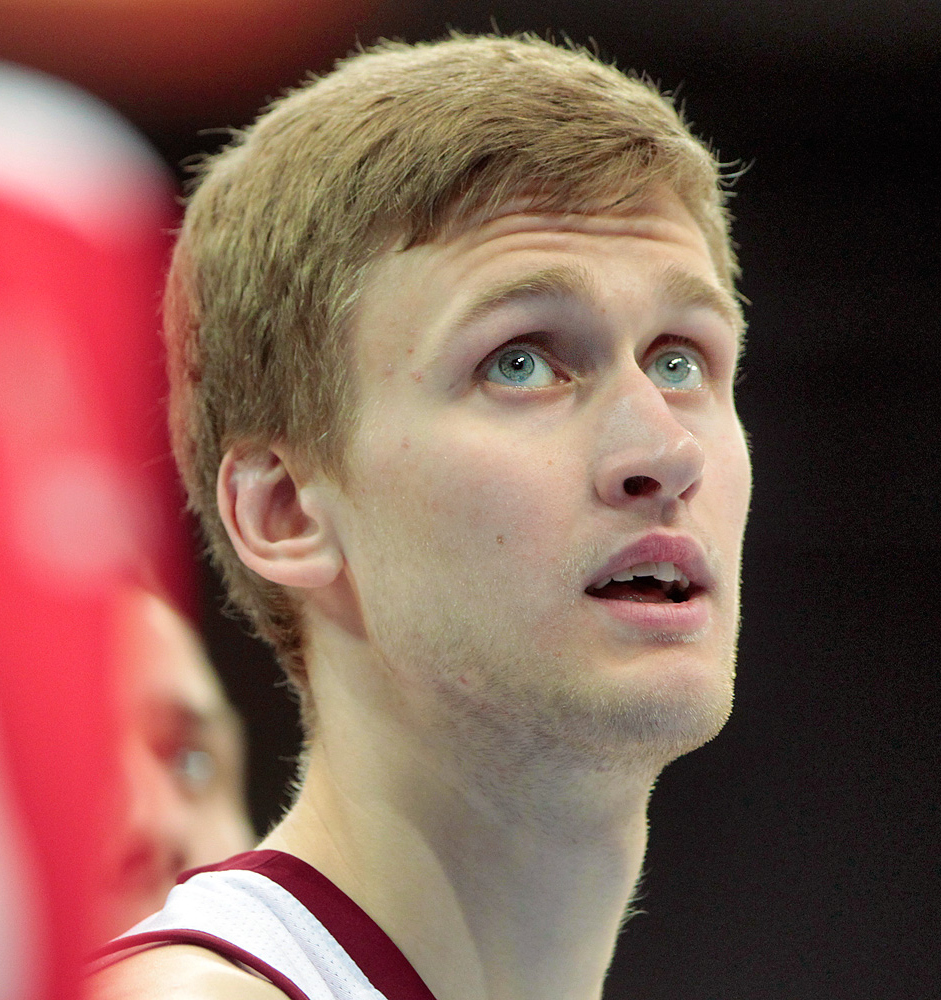
- Žalalis with Lietkabelis in 2015.

Personal information
- Born: 21 January 1995 (age 31) Vilnius, Lithuania
- Listed height: 205 cm (6.73 ft)
- Listed weight: 97 kg (214 lb)

Career information
- Playing career: 2013–present
- Position: Power forward

Career history
- 2013–2017: Lietkabelis
- 2013–2014: →Vilnius
- 2014-2015: →Bangenė-Aivera Panevėžys
- 2016–2017: →Delikatesas Joniškis
- 2017–2020: Dzūkija Alytus
- 2020-2021: CBet Jonava

Gediminas Žalalis (born 21 January 1995) is a professional Lithuanian basketball player. He plays for power forward position.

== Professional career ==
In 2013 Žalalis signed a 4-year contract with Lietkabelis Panevėžys. He began his first professional season in Lietkabelis, but was later loaned to BC Vilnius of the NKL and Bangenė-Aivera Panevėžys of the RKL to gain more experience. Žalalis returned to Lietkabelis in the 2014–15 season.

== International career ==
Žalalis previously represented five Lithuanian youth squads.
