= Brian Wanamaker =

American professional basketball player (born 1989)

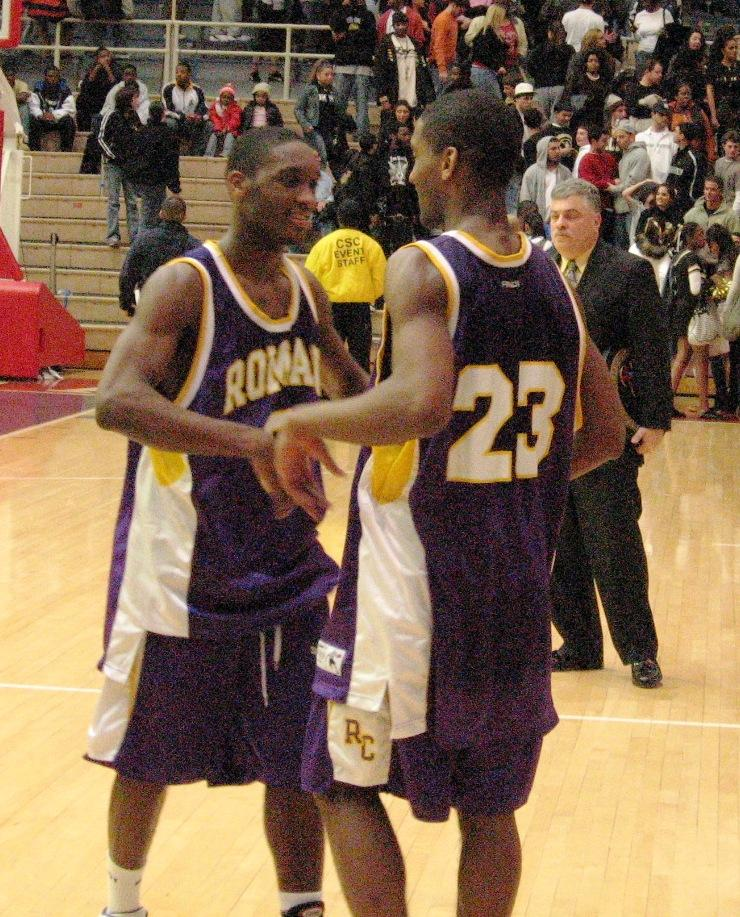
- Wanamaker (left) playing with Roman Catholic High School in Philadelphia in 2006

Personal information
- Born: July 25, 1989 (age 36) Philadelphia, Pennsylvania, U.S.
- Listed height: 6 ft 3 in (1.91 m)
- Listed weight: 200 lb (91 kg)

Career information
- High school: Roman Catholic (Philadelphia, Pennsylvania)
- College: Central Connecticut (2007–2008); Lon Morris (2008–2009); Texas Wesleyan (2009–2011)
- NBA draft: 2011: undrafted
- Playing career: 2011–2018
- Position: Guard

Career history
- 2014–2015: TSV Tröster Breitengüßbach
- 2015–2016: Erfurt
- 2016–2017: Šilutė
- 2017–2018: Vytis

Career highlights
- RRAC Player of the Year (2011); First-team NAIA Division I All-American (2011)

Brian Steven Wanamaker (born July 25, 1989) is an American former professional basketball player. Born in Philadelphia, he played high school basketball for Roman Catholic High School. He began his college career with Central Connecticut before transferring to Lon Morris as a sophomore. The combo guard spent his final two seasons at Texas Wesleyan.

After college, Wanamaker was drafted into the NBA D-League but primarily competed in the Eurobasket Summer League and other basketball exposure camps for the next three years. In 2014, he briefly joined the German team TSV Tröster Breitengüßbach of the Regionalliga and then moved to BC Erfurt in the same league. For the 2016–17 season, he played in Lithuania with BC Šilutė in the NKL.

== Early life and high school career ==
Wanamaker was born in Philadelphia on July 25, 1989, to Brad Wanamaker, Sr. and Deborah Samuel. He has four siblings: James, Crystal, Latisha, and twin brother Brad, who was born 71 minutes after. Wanamaker grew up frequently playing basketball with his father and twin brother at local North Philadelphia playgrounds. He played basketball under head coach Dennis Seddon at Roman Catholic High School in Philadelphia, where he was teammates with both Brad and coveted recruit Maalik Wayns. In his senior season, he averaged 14 points per game and led the team to a 28–3 record and a Catholic League title. He also earned second-team all-league and all-city honors. In the 2007 recruiting class, Wanamaker was rated a three-star recruit by 247Sports. He had received a scholarship offer to Georgetown as a junior with his brother but his recruitment was hindered by an injury.

College recruiting information
Name	Hometown	School	Height	Weight	Commit date
Brian Wanamaker; SG	Philadelphia, Pennsylvania	Roman Catholic	6 ft 2 in (1.88 m)	187.5 lb (85.0 kg)	Apr 16, 2007
Brian Wanamaker; SG	Recruit ratings: 247Sports: (89)				
Overall recruit ranking: 247Sports: 325, 73 (SG), 13 (PA) ESPN: 47 (SG)
Note: In many cases, Scout, Rivals, 247Sports, On3, and ESPN may conflict in their listings of height and weight.; In these cases, the average was taken. ESPN grades are on a 100-point scale.; Sources: "2007 Player Commitments – Central Connecticut". ESPN.; "2007 Team Ranking". Rivals.

== College career ==
After committing on April 16, 2007, Wanamaker played one season of college basketball with Central Connecticut at the NCAA Division I level. He received very limited playing time, playing 14 games as a freshman but averaging only 2.9 minutes per game. He recorded his only field goal in the season on January 19, 2008 against Fairleigh Dickinson.

For his sophomore season, Wanamaker transferred to Lon Morris College in Jacksonville, Texas. He played basketball under head coach Dale Dotson in the National Junior College Athletic Association (NJCAA). At Lon Morris, he averaged 9.3 points, 4.3 rebounds, 4.2 assists, and 2.2 steals per game en route to a conference title and a 26–6 record.

In 2009, Wanamaker transferred again to Texas Wesleyan University, where he played two seasons of basketball at the National Association of Intercollegiate Athletics (NAIA) level. In a three-game stretch as a junior, he averaged a double-double of 12 points and 10 rebounds, earning back-to-back Player of the Week honors in the Red River Athletic Conference (RRAC). As a senior, after averaging 19.2 points, 5.4 rebounds, and 4.9 assists per game, he was named NAIA Division I First-Team All-American and RRAC Player of the Year.

== Professional career ==
On November 3, 2011, Wanamaker was selected by the Fort Wayne Mad Ants with the tenth pick in the seventh round of the 2011 NBA Development League Draft. About two weeks later, the team waived him.

In 2012, Wanamaker took part the Eurobasket Summer League (ESL) in Las Vegas, where he played for Union Monaco. After five games in the exposure camp, he averaged 6.6 points, 3.6 rebounds, and 2.2 assists per game. In the following summer, he competed in the WorldwideSM Invitational camp at the University of Nevada, Las Vegas. Later that year, Wanamaker played for s.Oliver Baskets of the Basketball Bundesliga for the preseason. In 2014, he returned to the ESL and competed in Brooklyn for Team Buenos Aires and in Las Vegas for Team Monaco. In Brooklyn, he was named league MVP.

For the 2014–15 season, Wanamaker signed with TSV Tröster Breitengüßbach of the Regionalliga, the fourth-best basketball league in Germany. In two games, he averaged 19.5 points, 4.0 rebounds, 5.0 assists, and 2.5 steals per game. Wanamaker completed the season with the Regionalliga team BC Erfurt, averaging 25.9 points, 7.3 rebounds, 3.2 assists, and 2.9 steals. He remained with Erfurt for the following season and was averaging 20.8 points, 7.6 rebounds, 4.0 assists, and 3.4 steals after 17 games.

In 2016, Wanamaker moved to Lithuania to play for BC Šilutė of the National Basketball League, the second-best league in the country. In 44 games, he averaged 13.3 points, 5.3 rebounds, 4.3 assists, and 2.3 steals per game. For 2017–18, Wanamaker joined BC Vytis in the NKL. On December 12, 2017, he was named NKL Player of the Week by Eurobasket.com after helping defeat Šilutė with 25 points, four rebounds, and six assists.

== Personal life ==
Wanamaker is the twin brother of former NBA and Pittsburgh college player Brad Wanamaker.
