= Tomas Dimša =

Lithuanian basketball player

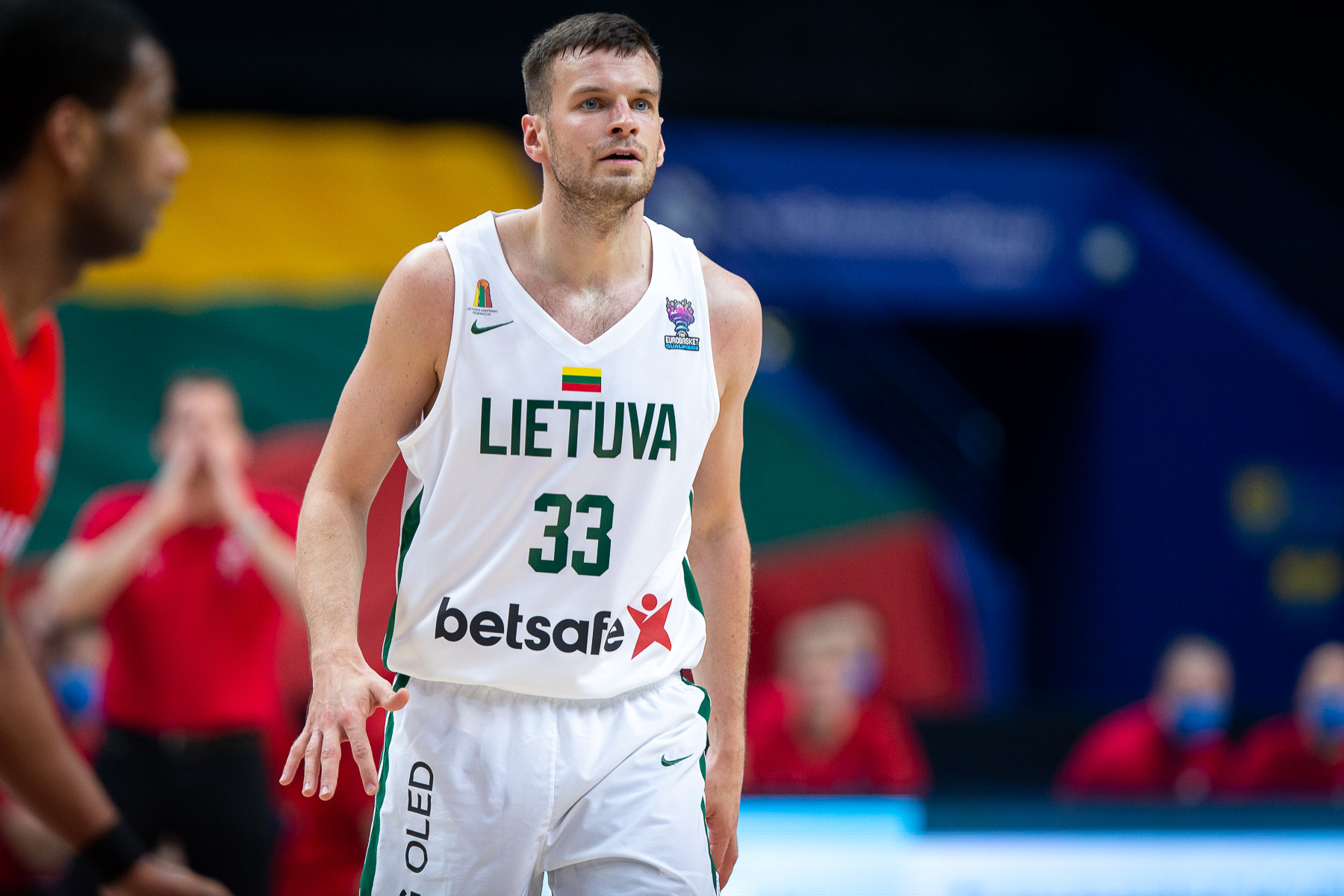
- Dimša with Lithuania in 2021

No. 33 – Básquet Coruña
- Position: Shooting guard / small forward
- League: Liga ACB

Personal information
- Born: 2 January 1994 (age 32) Kaunas, Lithuania
- Listed height: 1.96 m (6 ft 5 in)
- Listed weight: 85 kg (187 lb)

Career information
- NBA draft: 2016: undrafted
- Playing career: 2009–present

Career history
- 2009–2015: Žalgiris Kaunas
- 2009–2013: →Žalgiris-2 Kaunas
- 2015–2016: Skyliners Frankfurt
- 2016–2018: Vytautas Prienai-Birštonas
- 2018: Pallacanestro Varese
- 2018–2019: Juventus Utena
- 2019–2020: Lietkabelis
- 2020–2025: Žalgiris Kaunas
- 2020–2021: →Gran Canaria
- 2021–2022: →Universo Treviso
- 2025: Casademont Zaragoza
- 2025–2026: PAOK Thessaloniki
- 2026–present: Básquet Coruña

Career highlights
- Nike Hoop Summit (2013); 3× LKL champion (2014, 2015, 2023); 3× King Mindaugas Cup winner (2023–2025); LKF Cup winner (2015); FIBA Europe Cup champion (2016)
Medals
Men's basketball
Representing Lithuania
FIBA European U-16 Championship
Silver medal – second place	2010 Montenegro	National Team
FIBA World U-19 Championship
Bronze medal – third place	2013 Czech	National Team
Summer Universiade
Gold medal – first place	2017 Taipei	Team competition

Tomas Dimša (born 2 January 1994) is a Lithuanian professional basketball player for Básquet Coruña of the Liga ACB.

== Professional career ==
Before starting his professional career, Dimša played in the NKL with the Žalgiris-Arvydas Sabonis school for four seasons. He won bronze medals during his last two seasons with the Sabonis school team.

In April 2013, Dimša was invited to participate in the Nike Hoop Summit.

On 15 May 2013, Dimša was brought into the main Žalgiris Kaunas roster for a game against Nizhny Novgorod in the VTB United League. According to the new Žalgiris director P. Motiejūnas, Dimša will see more playing time next season. On 19 August 2016, he signed with Vytautas Prienai–Birštonas of Lithuanian Basketball League (LKL), and was a member of the team until contract's termination on 11 April 2018. One day later, he signed with Italian club Pallacanestro Varese of the LBA until the end of the season.

On 27 September 2018, Dimša signed a one-year deal with Juventus Utena of the LKL.

On 29 June 2019, he signed a 1+1 year contract with Lietkabelis Panevėžys. He averaged 14.1 points, 2.7 rebounds and 3.6 assists per game in 2019–20.

On 5 June 2020, Dimša signed back with Žalgiris Kaunas. On June 11, 2023, he renewed his contract with the EuroLeague mainstays for two more seasons.

On 20 February 2025, Dimša signed with Casademont Zaragoza of the Liga ACB.

On 10 August 2025, Dimša signed with Greek club PAOK Thessaloniki.

On 2 August 2026, Dimša signed with Básquet Coruña of the Liga ACB.

== Lithuanian national team ==
Dimša represented Lithuania in the U–16 and U–19 youth tournaments. He led his team to a silver medal and a bronze medal while participating in two tournaments. In 2014 coach Jonas Kazlauskas included Dimša into preliminary 24 players list for main Lithuania national basketball team.

Dimša won gold medal with the Lithuanian team during the 2017 Summer Universiade after defeating the United States' team 74–85 in the final.

== Career statistics ==
Legend
GP	Games played	GS	Games started	MPG	Minutes per game
FG%	Field-goal percentage	3P%	3-point field-goal percentage	FT%	Free-throw percentage
RPG	Rebounds per game	APG	Assists per game	SPG	Steals per game
BPG	Blocks per game	PPG	Points per game	PIR	Performance index rating
**Bold**	Career high

=== EuroLeague ===
Year	Team	GP	GS	MPG	FG%	3P%	FT%	RPG	APG	SPG	BPG	PPG	PIR
2013–14	Žalgiris	15	3	15.3	.396	**.409**	**.727**	**1.6**	.6	.2	**.1**	3.7	2.0
2014–15	Žalgiris	10	0	6.7	.292	.000	.000	.9	.7	.2	—	1.4	-0.4
2022–23	Žalgiris	**36**	**7**	15.8	.383	.342	.722	1.1	.9	**.5**	**.1**	5.9	3.1
2023–24	Žalgiris	33	4	**17.8**	**.420**	.381	.682	1.5	**1.7**	.4	**.1**	**6.4**	**4.3**
Career		94	14	15.5	.395	.360	.690	1.3	1.1	.4	.1	5.2	3.0
