= Martynas Linkevičius =

Lithuanian basketball player (born 1985)

Sūduva-Mantinga
- Position: Small forward
- League: National Basketball League

Personal information
- Born: December 8, 1985 (age 40) Kaunas, Lithuania
- Listed height: 1.97 m (6 ft 6 in)
- Listed weight: 96 kg (212 lb)

Career information
- Playing career: 2006–present

Career history
- 2006–2008, 2009–2010: Tauragės Bremena-KTU/Žalvaris
- 2010–2011: BC Vilkyškių Pieninė Pagėgiai
- 2012–2013: Triobet Jonava
- 2013–2014: Tonybet Prienai
- 2014–2015: BC Šiauliai
- 2015: BC Prienai
- 2015–2016: BC Juventus
- 2016–2018: Vytautas Prienai–Birštonas
- 2018–2019: Sintek-Jonava
- 2019–present: Sūduva-Mantinga

Career highlights
- Lithuanian League rebounding leader (2015)

Martynas Linkevičius (born 8 December 1985) is a Lithuanian professional basketball player. He mostly plays at the small forward position.

== Professional career ==
Linkevičius started his professional career in Bremena Tauragė. He was named MVP of the week in March 2015 after scoring 31 points in a game. Linkevičius was again named MVP of the week of November 13, 2017 after scoring 22 points against BC Pieno žvaigždės. He had 16 points in the Big Baller Brand Challenge in January 2018.

== Disqualification ==
On 17 June 2008, playing in Kaunas amateur league, Linkevičius beat referee by kicking with knee to referee back, and one more time when referee was on the ground. On 25 June, Linkevičius has been disqualified for two years to play in any official LKF match.
