= Ballislife.com =

American sports website

- Available in: English
- Website: ballislife.com
- Commercial: yes
- Launched: 2005 (21 years ago)
- Current status: Active

Ballislife.com is an American sports website that provides basketball coverage and video mixtapes. Founded in 2005 by young basketball fans Matt Rodriguez and Jonathan Durden, the site is now owned by Rodriguez and Arek Kissoyan. It specializes in creating highlights of high school players, as well as delivering up to date coverage in and around the sport of basketball as a whole. The company also sells a line of apparel to supplement its YouTube advertising revenue, and hosts a summer camp for fifth through ninth graders.

In 2011, it started the Ballislife All-American Game, an annual high school all-star game. Originally created to showcase West Coast basketball players, it grew to include top players from throughout the nation. Since the 2015–16 season, Ballislife.com has published the FAB 50 National Team Rankings, a weekly ranking of the top high school basketball teams in the nation, and has also awarded the Mr. Basketball USA honor, given to the top boys basketball player in the nation.
