= Prienai Arena =

Arena in Prienai, Lithuania

Prienai arena
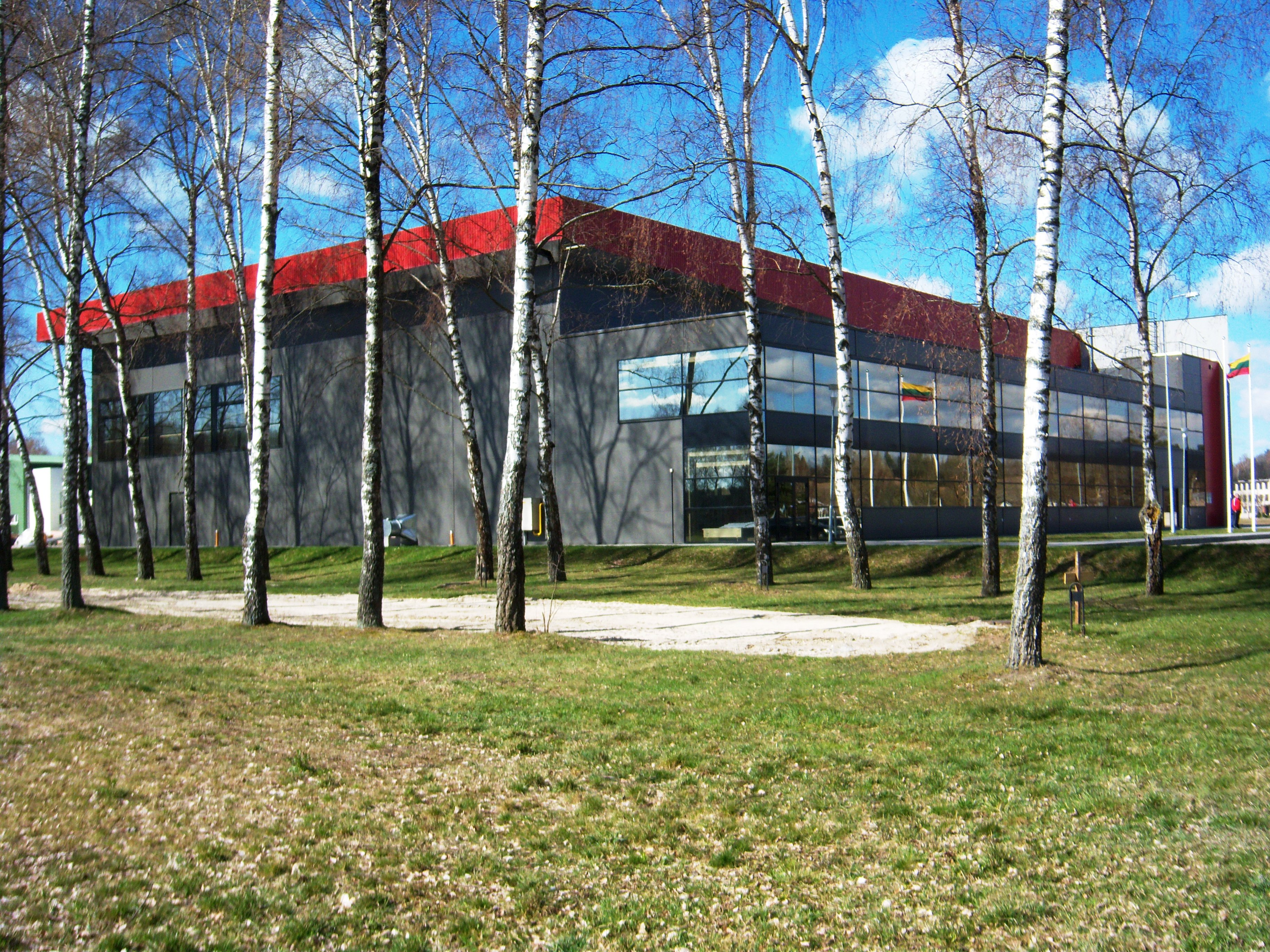
- Interactive map of Prienai arena
- Address: Pramonės g. 20
- Location: Prienai, Lithuania
- Coordinates: 54°38′52″N 23°57′41″E
- Owner: Prienai District Municipality
- Capacity: Basketball: 1,500; Concerts: 1,800

Construction
- Opened: November 4, 2011
- Cost: 16 million LTL

Tenant
- BC Vytautas (2011–present)

The Prienai entertainment and sports arena is a multifunctional arena in Prienai, Lithuania. The arena opened on November 4, 2011 with its first official basketball game, with Rūdupis defeating Techasas 81-56. It previously served as the home of the now-defunct basketball club BC Vytautas.
