= Justas Tamulis =

Lithuanian basketball player (born 1994)

Personal information
- Born: 12 July 1994 (age 32) Kėdainiai, Lithuania
- Listed height: 194 cm (6.36 ft)
- Listed weight: 86 kg (190 lb)

Career information
- Playing career: 2011–present
- Position: Small forward
- Number: 5

Career history
- 2011–2014: Žalgiris-2 Kaunas
- 2014: Cafés Candelas Breogán
- 2014–2015: Nevėžis Kėdainiai
- 2015–2017: Pieno žvaigždės Pasvalys
- 2017–2018: Nevėžis Kėdainiai
- 2018–2019: CSU Sibiu
- 2019–2020: CSU Pitesti
- 2020: Pieno žvaigždės Pasvalys
- 2020–2021: Nevėžis Kėdainiai
- 2021–2022: CSU Sibiu
- 2022–2023: KR
- 2023: Club Melilla Baloncesto
- 2023–2024: BC Jonava
- 2024: Valur
- 2024–2025: Þór Þorlákshöfn
Medals
Men's basketball
Representing Lithuania
FIBA World Under-19 Championship
Bronze medal – third place	2013 Czech Republic	U-19 Team
FIBA Europe Under-18 Championship
Silver medal – second place	2012 Latvia/Lithuania	U-18 Team
FIBA Europe Under-16 Championship
Silver medal – second place	2010 Montenegro	U-16 Team
Summer Universiade
Gold medal – first place	2017 Taipei	Team competition

Justas Tamulis (born 12 July 1994) is a Lithuanian professional basketball player. He plays the small forward position.

== Career ==
In February 2024, Tamulis signed with Valur of the Icelandic Úrvalsdeild karla.

== International career ==
Tamulis previously represented the Lithuanian youth squads and won three silver medals with them.

Tamulis won gold medal with the Lithuanian team during the 2017 Summer Universiade after defeating the United States' team 74–85 in the final.
