= Gediminas Maceina =

Lithuanian basketball player (born 1984)

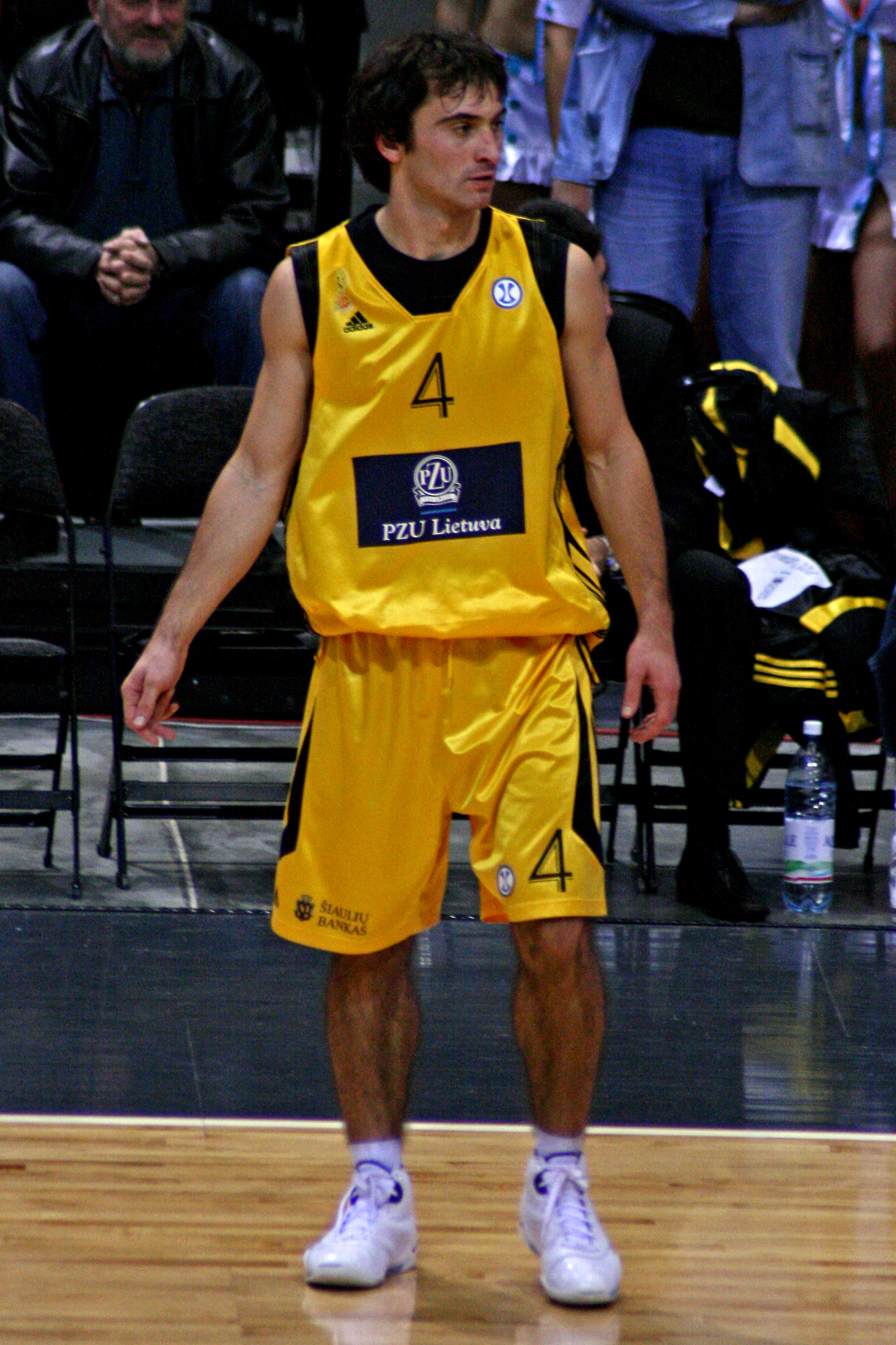
- Maceina in 2007

Personal information
- Born: August 28, 1984 (age 42) Prienai, Lithuanian SSR, Soviet Union
- Listed height: 6 ft 2 in (1.88 m)
- Listed weight: 195 lb (88 kg)

Career information
- Playing career: 2000–2022
- Position: Point guard

Career history
- 2000–2002: Prienai
- 2002–2004: Žalgiris-2
- 2004: Neptūnas
- 2004–2006: Nevėžis
- 2006–2007: Barons
- 2007–2009: Šiauliai
- 2009–2010: Rūdupis
- 2010: Techasas
- 2010–2012: Juventus
- 2012–2013: BC Pieno žvaigždės
- 2013–2014: Dnipro-Azot
- 2014: BC Nevėžis
- 2014–2015: BC Mažeikiai
- 2015: BC Prienai
- 2016–2017: BC Vytis
- 2017–2022: BC Vytautas/CBet/KKSC Prienai
Medals
Men's basketball
Representing Lithuania
FIBA Under-19 Basketball World Cup
Silver medal – second place	2003 Greece	National Team

Gediminas Maceina (born 28 August 1984) is a Lithuanian former professional basketball player.

== Achievements ==
- 2008 year: LKL Bronze medal
- 2011 year: BBL Champion (Challenge cup)
