= Egidijus Dimša =

Lithuanian basketball player (born 1985)

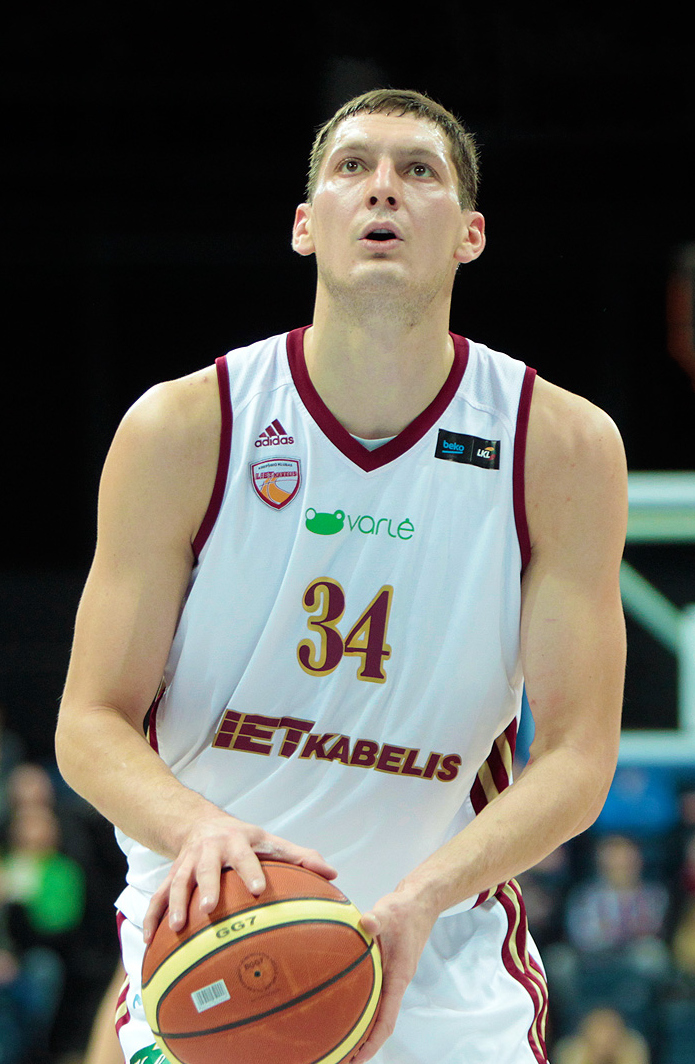
- Dimša with Lietkabelis Panevėžys in 2015

Personal information
- Born: April 1, 1985 (age 41) Kaunas, Lithuania
- Listed height: 2.05 m (6 ft 9 in)
- Listed weight: 100 kg (220 lb)

Career information
- NBA draft: 2007: undrafted
- Playing career: 2006–2025
- Position: Center

Career history
- 2006–2007: Nafta-Universitetas-Laivitė Klaipėda
- 2007–2008: Aisčiai-Atletas Kaunas
- 2008–2009: Aisčiai Kaunas
- 2009–2011, 2012: Nevėžis Kėdainiai
- 2011: Techasas Panevėžys
- 2011–2012: Fortitudo Pallacanestro Bologna
- 2012–2013: University of Tartu
- 2013–2014: Pieno žvaigždės Pasvalys
- 2014–2015: Neptūnas Klaipėda
- 2015: Lietkabelis Panevėžys
- 2015–2016: Juventus Utena
- 2016–2017: Pieno žvaigždės Pasvalys
- 2017–2018: Vytautas Prienai–Birštonas
- 2018–2020: Dzūkija Alytus
- 2020–2021: CBet Prienai
- 2021-2023: Atletas Kaunas
- 2023-2024: Sūduva-Mantinga
- 2024-2025: Jurbarkas-Karys

Career highlights
- Lithuanian LKL MVP (2010); Lithuanian League rebounding leader (2010); Lithuanian League leading scorer (2011)

Egidijus Dimša (born April 1, 1985) is a Lithuanian former professional basketball player. He plays the center position.

He signed with CBet Prienai on September 19, 2020.
