= Arminas Urbutis =

Lithuanian basketball player

Personal information
- Born: May 15, 1986 (age 40) Kaunas, Lithuanian SSR, Soviet Union
- Listed height: 206 cm (6 ft 9 in)
- Listed weight: 100 kg (220 lb)

Career information
- High school: Montverde Academy (Montverde, Florida)
- College: Hofstra (2005–2009)
- NBA draft: 2009: undrafted
- Playing career: 2009–2026
- Position: Power forward

Career history
- 2009–2011: Bennet Cantù
- 2011: Rūdupis Prienai
- 2012: Scavolini Pesaro
- 2012-2013: Rūdupis Prienai
- 2013-2015: ADA Blois 41
- 2015-2017: Juventus
- 2017–2019: Šiauliai
- 2019–2020: Nevėžis Kėdainiai
- 2020–2023: Šiauliai
- 2023–2024: Palmer Basket Mallorca
- 2024-2026: Svethia Pallacanestro Recanati

Arminas Urbutis (born 15 May 1986) is a Lithuanian former professional basketball player. Standing at 206 cm (6 ft 9 in), Urbutis plays as power forward.

== Early life ==
Urbutis started playing basketball in a basketball school in Kaunas. After a few years of learning basketball in his hometown, he decided to go to the United States. There, he played at Montverde Academy.

== College career ==
Urbutis played college basketball at the Hofstra University, with the Hofstra Pride.

== Playing career ==
After graduating from Hofstra University, Urbutis went to Italy for basketball summer camps, where he was spotted by Bennet Cantù coaching staff. Both sides agreed to sign one-year deal. He spent two seasons in Bennet Cantù and won silver medals in Serie A.

On 30 August 2019, Urbutis signed with Nevėžis Kėdainiai of the Lithuanian Basketball League.
