= Paulius Ivanauskas =

Lithuanian basketball player (born 1987)

Personal information
- Born: April 24, 1987 (age 39) Prienai, Lithuanian SSR, Soviet Union
- Listed height: 1.95 m (6 ft 5 in)
- Listed weight: 80 kg (176 lb)

Career information
- Playing career: 2002–2018
- Position: Point guard

Career history
- 2002–2004: BC Prienai
- 2004–2005: Žalgiris-2 Kaunas
- 2006–2008: Sakalai Vilnius
- 2007: →BC Prienai
- 2008–2011: BC Alytus
- 2011–2018: Vytautas Prienai–Birštonas

Paulius Ivanauskas (born 24 April 1987) is a Lithuanian former professional basketball player. He played at the point guard position.

== Professional career ==
A native of Prienai, Ivanauskas started his professional career by signing with his hometown club BC Prienai in 2002, being only 15 years old. He returned to BC Prienai in 2011, and played there until his retirement in 2018.
