= Regimantas Miniotas =

Lithuanian basketball player (born 1996)

- Miniotas with the Lithuania national team

No. 22 – Victoria Libertas Pesaro
- Position: Power forward / center
- League: Serie A2

Personal information
- Born: March 14, 1996 (age 30) Kėdainiai, Lithuania
- Listed height: 2.08 m (6 ft 10 in)
- Listed weight: 105 kg (231 lb)

Career information
- Playing career: 2014–present

Career history
- 2014–2016: Žalgiris-2 Kaunas
- 2016–2018: Vytautas Prienai–Birštonas
- 2018–2019: Nevėžis Kėdainiai
- 2019–2020: CBet Prienai
- 2020–2021: Bilbao Basket
- 2021–2022: Žalgiris Kaunas
- 2022–2025: BC Wolves
- 2025–present: Victoria Libertas Pesaro

Regimantas Miniotas (born 14 March 1996) is a Lithuanian professional basketball player for Victoria Libertas Pesaro of the Serie A2.

== Professional career ==
Miniotas started his professional career when he signed with BC Žalgiris-2 in 2014, after performance at Euroleague Youth Tournament. Averaging 16 points and 6.5 rebounds and 3.3 assists, Miniotas was selected to an All-Tournament Team.

He played 2 seasons in Žalgiris-2 team in NKL, averaging 8 points and 5.5 rebounds. The most successful was second season, when team won NKL silver medals.

In the 2016–17 season, he signed with Vytautas Prienai-Birštonas.

On 28 November 2020, he signed with Bilbao Basket of the Liga ACB.

On November 18, 2021, he has signed with Žalgiris Kaunas of the Lithuanian Basketball League (LKL).

On July 10, 2022, he has signed with BC Wolves of the Lithuanian Basketball League.

On August 14, 2025, he signed with Victoria Libertas Pesaro of the Serie A2.
