= Justas Sinica =

Lithuanian basketball player (born 1985)

Justinas Sinica
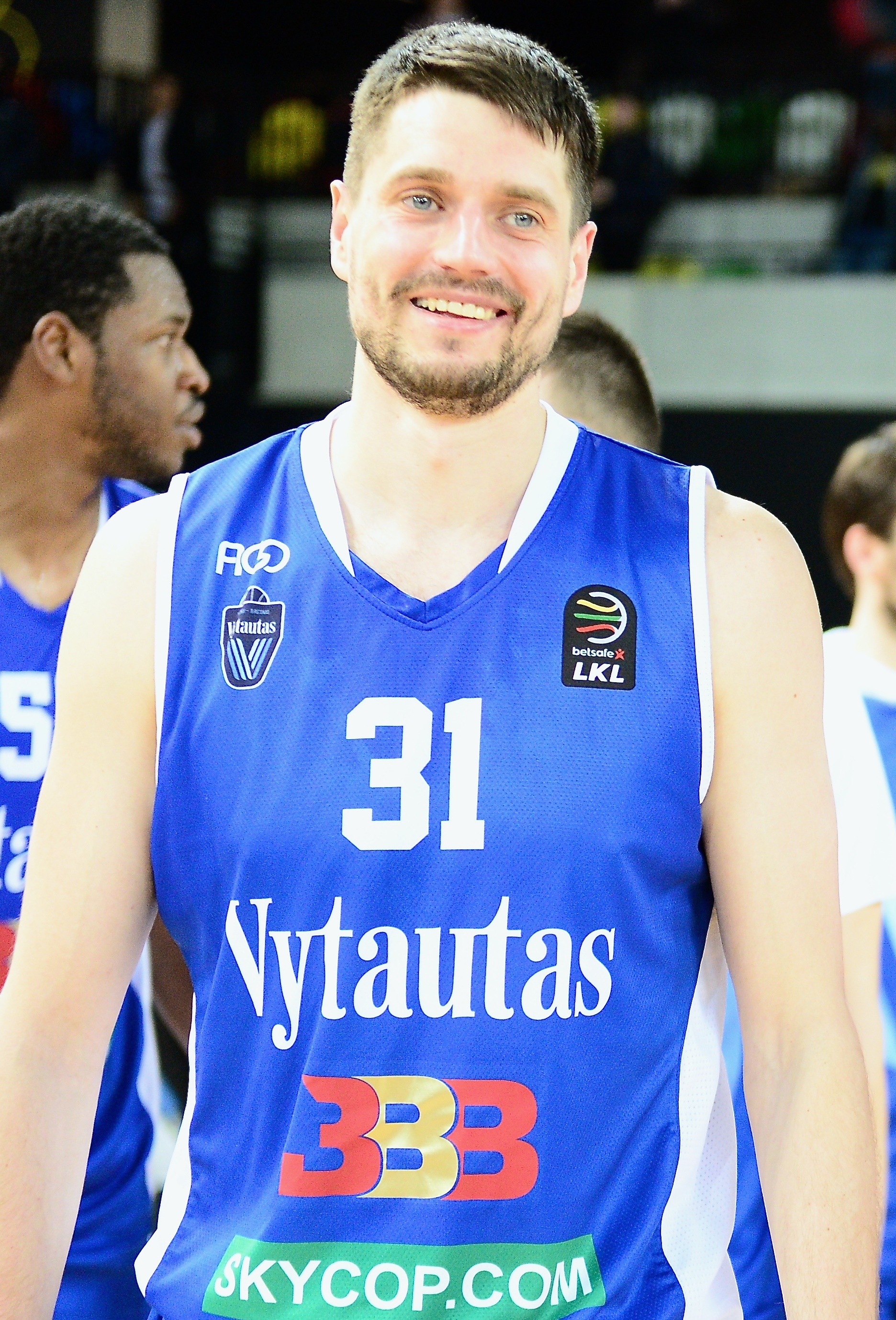
- Sinica in April 2018

Personal information
- Born: 31 May 1985 (age 41) Zarasai, Lithuanian SSR, Soviet Union
- Listed height: 2.03 m (6 ft 8 in)
- Listed weight: 105 kg (231 lb)

Career information
- NBA draft: 2007: undrafted
- Playing career: 2003–2024
- Position: Power forward

Career history
- 2003–2004: Aukštaitija Panevėžys
- 2004–2008: Sakalai Vilnius
- 2008–2010: Lietuvos rytas Vilnius
- 2010–2012: Rūdupis Prienai
- 2012: Minsk-2006
- 2012–2013: Sakalai Vilnius
- 2013: Pieno žvaigždės Pasvalys
- 2013–2015: Neptūnas Klaipėda
- 2015–2016: San Pablo Inmobiliaria Burgos
- 2016: Nevėžis Kėdainiai
- 2016–2017: Caen Basket Calvados
- 2017–2018: Vytautas Prienai–Birštonas
- 2018: RETAbet Bilbao Basket
- 2018–2019: Union Tarbes-Lourdes Pyrénées Basket
- 2019–2021: BC Orchies
- 2022-2024: BC Stekas Vilnius/Ukmergė

Justinas "Justas" Sinica (born 31 May 1985) is a Lithuanian former professional basketball player.

== Professional career ==
On September 15, 2016, Sinica signed with Nevėžis Kėdainiai of Lithuanian Basketball League. On August 27, 2018, Sinica signed with RETAbet Bilbao Basket of the LEB Oro.
