= BC Dzūkija =

- Founded: 2012; 13 years ago
- Dissolved: 2022; 3 years ago
- History: Dzūkija (2012–2019) (2020–2022); Sintek-Dzūkija (2019–2020)
- Location: Alytus, Lithuania
- Team colors: Green and white
Home	Away

BC Dzūkija (Lithuanian: Krepšinio klubas Dzūkija) was a professional basketball club located in Alytus, Lithuania. It was founded in 2012 and participated in the Lietuvos krepšinio lyga (LKL). It was the newest basketball club based in Alytus after BC Alita and BC Alytus were dissolved. The club was bought by Lithuanian businessman Gediminas Žiemelis in June 2022, who formed BC Wolves soon after.

== History ==
In 2019, the club changed its name to Sintek-Dzūkija for sponsorship reasons.

It dissolved in 2022 after businessman Gediminas Žiemelis bought the club. The team’s last appearance was game 4 of the 2021-22 LKL playoffs, where they lost to Rytas Vilnius and lost the series 1-3.

== Notable players ==
Note: Flags indicate national team eligibility at FIBA-sanctioned events. Players may hold other non-FIBA nationalities not displayed.

Criteria

To appear in this section a player must have either:

- Set a club record or won an individual award while at the club
- Played at least one official international match for their national team at any time
- Played at least one official NBA match at any time.

- (Poland) Adam Lapeta (2013-2016, 2021–2022)
- (Lithuania) Giedrius Gustas (2014-2016)
- (Lithuania) Artūras Jomantas (2014–2015, 2018–2022)
- (Lithuania) Tadas Rinkūnas (2015-2016, 2020–2022)
- (Lithuania) Julius Jucikas (2016)
- (United States) Katin Reinhardt (2017-2018)
- (United States) Perry Petty (2018)
- (Lithuania) Egidijus Dimša (2018–2020)
- (United States) Ken Brown (2018)
- (Lithuania) Steponas Babrauskas (2018–2019)
- (Turkey) Kerem Kanter (2019)
- (United States) Chauncey Collins (2019-2020)

== Season by season ==
Season	Tier	League	Pos.	Cup
2012–13	2	NKL	2nd	
2013–14	1	LKL	10th	Fourth round
2014–15	1	LKL	6th	Quarterfinalist
2015–16	1	LKL	10th	
2016–17	1	LKL	8th	Quarterfinalist
2017–18	1	LKL	9th	Semifinalist
2018–19	1	LKL	8th	Quarterfinalist
2019–20	1	LKL	9th	Quarterfinalist
2020–21	1	LKL	9th	Second round
2021–22	1	LKL	8th	Quarterfinalist

== Head coaches ==
- (Lithuania) Valdemaras Chomičius 2018–2020
- (North Macedonia) Nikola Vasilev 2020–2022
