= BC Vytis =

Vytis
- Leagues: National Basketball League
- Founded: 2005; 20 years ago
- History: Zanavykas (2005–2015); Vytis (2015–present)
- Arena: Šakių Sport Center
- Capacity: 800
- Location: Šakiai, Lithuania
- Team colors: White, red
- President: Vytautas Strokas
- Head coach: Erikas Kučiauskas
- Website: http://bcvytis.lt/
Home	Away

BC Vytis is a professional team based in Šakiai, Lithuania that currently plays in National Basketball League. In 2015, the club fans selected new club name and logo.

== Club achievements ==
- 2013–14 season: NKL Round of 16
- 2014–15 season: NKL Round of 16
- 2015–16 season: NKL Quarterfinals
- 2016–17 season: NKL Third place
- 2017–18 season: NKL Third place
- 2018-19 season: NKL Runner-Up

== Team roster ==
BC Vytis roster
Players
Coaches

Pos.	No.	Nat.	Name	Ht.	Wt.	Age
G/F	1	(Lithuania)	Beliavičius, Paulius	1.96 m (6 ft 5 in)	87 kg (192 lb)	37 – 26 April 1988
G	2	(Lithuania)	Semaška, Paulius	1.85 m (6 ft 1 in)	79 kg (174 lb)	32 – 14 January 1993
G/F	5	(Lithuania)	Vingelis, Šarūnas	1.96 m (6 ft 5 in)	90 kg (198 lb)	35 – 16 November 1989
C	7	(Lithuania)	Lavrinovič, Darjuš	2.12 m (6 ft 11 in)	110 kg (243 lb)	45 – 1 November 1979
SG	8	(Lithuania)	Alekna, Henrikas	1.95 m (6 ft 5 in)	82 kg (181 lb)	24 – 8 April 2001
C	12	(Lithuania)	Lavrinovič, Kšyštof	2.10 m (6 ft 11 in)	108 kg (238 lb)	45 – 1 November 1979
F	13	(Lithuania)	Užupis, Marijus	1.97 m (6 ft 6 in)	95 kg (209 lb)	32 – 5 March 1993
PF	17	(Lithuania)	Kokoška, Karolis	1.96 m (6 ft 5 in)	94 kg (207 lb)	33 – 18 May 1992
G/F	23	(Lithuania)	Čelka, Gabrielius	1.98 m (6 ft 6 in)	80 kg (176 lb)	23 – 26 September 2001
F/C	24	(Lithuania)	Pukelis, Aurelijus	2.05 m (6 ft 9 in)	100 kg (220 lb)	31 – 17 May 1994

Head coach

- (Lithuania) Erikas Kučiauskas

Team manager

- (Lithuania) Vytautas Strokas

Legend

- (C) Team captain
- Injured

- Roster
Updated: 2020-01-20

== Notable players and coaches ==
- (Lithuania) Dovydas Redikas

 Ignas Vaitkus
 Gytis Radzevičius
 Dominykas Domarkas
 Darius Maskoliūnas
 Aurimas Jasilionis
