= 2018 JBA season =

- League: Junior Basketball Association
- Sport: Basketball
- Duration: June 21, 2018 – August 12, 2018
- Teams: 8
- TV partner: Facebook Live (online)

Regular season
- Top seed: Los Angeles Ballers
- Top scorer: LiAngelo Ball (Los Angeles)

Playoffs

Finals
- Champions: Los Angeles Ballers
- Runners-up: Seattle Ballers
- Finals MVP: LiAngelo Ball

The 2018 JBA season was the only season of the Junior Basketball Association (JBA), an American men's professional basketball league. The JBA was designed as an alternative to the National Collegiate Athletic Association (NCAA), allowing high school and junior college players to immediately play professionally. The season began on June 21 and concluded with the JBA Finals on August 12, 2018. After the season concluded, the JBA selected many of its top players to take part in what was originally a 28-game international season against teams from various countries in Europe and Asia. However, an incident in Lithuania lead to a shortening of the event, with teams dropping out of matches and Asian teams cancelling their matches for late 2018 and early 2019 altogether.

== Teams ==
Location of venues for 2018 season

The 2018 JBA season consisted of eight teams, with each representing an American city and having the nickname "Ballers." Teams did not occupy a specified home arena; instead, every team faced each other in ten different arenas across the United States.

Team	Home city	Colors	Head coach
Atlanta Ballers	Atlanta, Georgia		(United States) Douglas Byrd
Chicago Ballers	Chicago, Illinois		(United States) Eddie Denard (United States) Nicolas Colon
Dallas Ballers	Dallas, Texas		(United States) Ray Johnson
Houston Ballers	Houston, Texas		(United States) Everett Rick
Los Angeles Ballers	Los Angeles, California		(United States) Doyle Balthazar
New York Ballers	New York City, New York		(United States) Marvin McCullough
Philadelphia Ballers	Philadelphia, Pennsylvania		(United States) James Martin
Seattle Ballers	Seattle, Washington		(United States) Charles O'Bannon

== Regular season ==
=== Standings ===
Pos	Team	Pld	W	L	PCT	Qualification
1	Los Angeles Ballers (C, Z)	8	6	2	.750	Qualification for the playoffs
2	Seattle Ballers	8	5	3	.625	Qualification for the playoffs
3	New York Ballers	8	5	3	.625	Qualification for the playoffs
4	Dallas Ballers	8	5	3	.625	Qualification for the playoffs
5	Atlanta Ballers	8	5	3	.625	Qualification for the playoffs
6	Houston Ballers	8	3	5	.375	Qualification for the playoffs
7	Chicago Ballers	8	2	6	.250	Qualification for the playoffs
8	Philadelphia Ballers (W)	8	1	7	.125	Qualification for the playoffs

Updated to match(es) played on July 29, 2018. Source: http://www.jbaleague.com
(C) Champions; (W) Clinched worst record; (Z) Clinched best record

=== Games ===
June 21, 2018 Day 1	Chicago	117–128	Atlanta	Ontario, California
5:00 PM (PST)	Scoring by quarter: 28–42, 30–23, 26–37, 33–26
	Pts: Rieger (27); Rebs: Dixson (17); Asts: K. Brown (10)	Report	Pts: Chaney (27); Rebs: Ray (12); Asts: Boyd (4)	Arena: Citizens Business Bank Arena; Attendance: 1,000

June 21, 2018 Day 1	New York	124–134	Los Angeles	Ontario, California
7:30 PM (PST)	Scoring by quarter: 22–31, 28–35, 35–32, 39–36
	Pts: C. Brown (36); Rebs: Abdelwahab, Camara (13); Asts: Burgos (9)	Report	Pts: Malone (43); Rebs: Floyd (22); Asts: La. Ball (10)	Arena: Citizens Business Bank Arena; Attendance: 1,000

June 23, 2018 Day 2	Dallas	103–121	Seattle	Houston, Texas
5:00 PM (CST)	Scoring by quarter: 24–26, 18–33, 27–36, 34–26
	Pts: Silfa (23); Rebs: Massey (15); Asts: Massey, Walker (4)	Report	Pts: J. Morgan (24); Rebs: Mitchell (17); Asts: Springer (5)	Arena: Health and Physical Education Arena

June 23, 2018 Day 2	New York	91–116	Houston	Houston, Texas
7:30 PM (CST)	Scoring by quarter: 15–26, 20–26, 26–36, 31–28
	Pts: Camara (18); Rebs: C. Brown, Mensah (11); Asts: Camara (3)	Report	Pts: Handy (25); Rebs: Myers (14); Asts: Hollis (8)	Arena: Health and Physical Education Arena

June 24, 2018 Day 3	Atlanta	123–118	Philadelphia	Kent, Washington
5:00 PM (PST)	Scoring by quarter: 10–31, 33–24, 33–31, 47–32
	Pts: Chaney (30); Rebs: Boyd (16); Asts: Butler (7)	Report	Pts: Haid (31); Rebs: Royster (17); Asts: Buckner (6)	Arena: ShoWare Center

June 24, 2018 Day 3	Los Angeles	150–145	Seattle	Kent, Washington
7:30 PM (PST)	Scoring by quarter: 26–37, 48–33, 35–32, 41–43
	Pts: Malone (48); Rebs: Floyd (33); Asts: La. Ball (8)	Report	Pts: Springer (48); Rebs: Springer (12); Asts: Springer (5)	Arena: ShoWare Center

June 26, 2018 Day 4	Dallas	92–96	New York	Chicago, Illinois
5:00 PM (CST)	Scoring by quarter: 14–19, 24–23, 26–33, 28–21
	Pts: Walker (39); Rebs: Walker (17); Asts: Silfa (5)	Report	Pts: C. Brown (28); Rebs: C. Brown (18); Asts: Antoine, Killing (3)	Arena: Wintrust Arena

June 26, 2018 Day 4	Houston	117–125(OT)	Chicago	Chicago, Illinois
7:30 PM (CST)	Scoring by quarter: 29–25, 26–28, 28–31, 24–23, Overtime: 10–18
	Pts: Myers (37); Rebs: Myers (20); Asts: Myers, Williams (4)	Report	Pts: K. Brown (46); Rebs: Lyle (13); Asts: Lyle (5)	Arena: Wintrust Arena

June 28, 2018 Day 5	Atlanta	146–135	Seattle	Garland, Texas
5:00 PM (CST)	Scoring by quarter: 40–29, 39–27, 34–43, 33–36
	Pts: Chaney (44); Rebs: Chaney (11); Asts: Butler (6)	Report	Pts: J. Morgan (33); Rebs: Davis, Mischke, Springer (12); Asts: J. Morgan (6)	Arena: Curtis Culwell Center

June 28, 2018 Day 5	Houston	105–102	Dallas	Garland, Texas
7:30 PM (CST)	Scoring by quarter: 19–21, 27–22, 27–24, 32–35
	Pts: Hollis (34); Rebs: Handy (13); Asts: Hollis (6)	Report	Pts: Walker (26); Rebs: Morris (8); Asts: Massey, McSpadden (3)	Arena: Curtis Culwell Center

June 29, 2018 Day 6	Chicago	105–103	Philadelphia	East Garden City, New York
4:00 PM (CST)	Scoring by quarter: 15–28, 19–20, 34–27, 37–28
	Pts: Singleton II (23); Rebs: Dixson, Singleton II (14); Asts: Lyle (4)	Report	Pts: Buckner (24); Rebs: Royster (15); Asts: Buckner (9)	Arena: David Mack Arena

June 29, 2018 Day 6	Los Angeles	108–130	New York	East Garden City, New York
6:30 PM (CST)	Scoring by quarter: 29–32, 23–33, 30–36, 26–29
	Pts: La. Ball (44); Rebs: La. Ball (13); Asts: Kirkham (7)	Report	Pts: C. Brown (41); Rebs: Mensah (14); Asts: Antoine, Irby (8)	Arena: David Mack Arena

July 3, 2018 Day 7	Los Angeles	110–122	Dallas	Duluth, Georgia
6:00 PM (CST)	Scoring by quarter: 28–31, 34–29, 18–31, 30–31
	Pts: La. Ball (40); Rebs: Floyd (15); Asts: La. Ball (9)	Report	Pts: Morris (24); Rebs: Massey (13); Asts: M. Morgan (6)	Arena: Infinite Energy Center

July 3, 2018 Day 7	Houston	109–115	Atlanta	Duluth, Georgia
8:30 PM (CST)	Scoring by quarter: 25–22, 37–38, 26–24, 21–31
	Pts: Hollis (29); Rebs: Hollis (16); Asts: Hollis (9)	Report	Pts: Chaney (45); Rebs: Boyd (10); Asts: Butler (8)	Arena: Infinite Energy Center

July 5, 2018 Day 8	Chicago	89–99	New York	Trenton, New Jersey
5:00 PM (CST)	Scoring by quarter: 26–21, 19–25, 21–19, 23–34
	Pts: Dixson (23); Rebs: Dixson (19); Asts: Hargrove (6)	Report	Pts: Camara (31); Rebs: C. Brown (11); Asts: Irby (7)	Arena: CURE Insurance Arena

July 5, 2018 Day 8	Philadelphia	125–120	Seattle	Trenton, New Jersey
7:30 PM (CST)	Scoring by quarter: 36–25, 34–36, 31–35, 24–24
	Pts: Nixon (39); Rebs: Johnson (13); Asts: Johnson (6)	Report	Pts: Springer (38); Rebs: J. Morgan, Mitchell (14); Asts: Springer (6)	Arena: CURE Insurance Arena

July 12, 2018 Day 9	Chicago	97–115	Seattle	Ontario, California
5:00 PM (CST)	Scoring by quarter: 22–34, 25–25, 24–37, 26–19
	Pts: Lyle (27); Rebs: Dixson (13); Asts: Lyle (6)	Report	Pts: Uzan (27); Rebs: Carmon (15); Asts: Carmon, Springer, Uzan (4)	Arena: Citizens Business Bank Arena

July 12, 2018 Day 9	Philadelphia	140–171	Los Angeles	Ontario, California
7:30 PM (CST)	Scoring by quarter: 40–48, 25–37, 35–37, 40–49
	Pts: Nixon (37); Rebs: Johnson (10); Asts: Johnson (8)	Report	Pts: Li. Ball (53); Rebs: Floyd (19); Asts: La. Ball (19)	Arena: Citizens Business Bank Arena

July 14, 2018 Day 10	Atlanta	124–119	Philadelphia	Houston, Texas
5:00 PM (CST)	Scoring by quarter: 25–27, 31–30, 33–23, 35–39
	Pts: Chaney (36); Rebs: Boyd (16); Asts: Butler (7)	Report	Pts: Nixon (25); Rebs: Croston (14); Asts: Buckner (8)	Arena: Health and Physical Education Arena

July 14, 2018 Day 10	Dallas	104–92	Houston	Houston, Texas
7:30 PM (CST)	Scoring by quarter: 18–22, 31–22, 25–19, 29–29
	Pts: Morris (21); Rebs: Wek (14); Asts: M. Morgan (11)	Report	Pts: Ross (26); Rebs: Lovelace (9); Asts: Hollis (7)	Arena: Health and Physical Education Arena

July 17, 2018 Day 11	Houston	111–103	Philadelphia	Fairfax, Virginia
5:00 PM (CST)	Scoring by quarter: 24–27, 31–12, 24–34, 32–30
	Pts: Hollis (37); Rebs: Hollis (16); Asts: Williams (6)	Report	Pts: Nixon (37); Rebs: E. Hall (10); Asts: Buckner (7)	Arena: EagleBank Arena

July 17, 2018 Day 11	Seattle	115–98	New York	Fairfax, Virginia
7:30 PM (CST)	Scoring by quarter: 27–18, 30–24, 33–28, 25–28
	Pts: Springer (25); Rebs: Clark (19); Asts: Uzan (6)	Report	Pts: Antoine (27); Rebs: Antoine (12); Asts: Irby (7)	Arena: EagleBank Arena

July 19, 2018 Day 12	Atlanta	123–170	Los Angeles	Garland, Texas
5:00 PM (CST)	Scoring by quarter: 11–41, 33–43, 32–48, 47–38
	Pts: Boyd (41); Rebs: Boyd (15); Asts: Butler (11)	Report	Pts: La. Ball, Li. Ball (48); Rebs: La. Ball (24); Asts: La. Ball (14)	Arena: Curtis Culwell Center

July 19, 2018 Day 12	Chicago	100–109	Dallas	Garland, Texas
7:30 PM (CST)	Scoring by quarter: 18–28, 27–34, 23–23, 32–24
	Pts: Rieger (23); Rebs: Lyle (18); Asts: Ingram, Lyle (5)	Report	Pts: Wek (31); Rebs: Wek (13); Asts: McSpadden (10)	Arena: Curtis Culwell Center

July 21, 2018 Day 13	Houston	98–125	Seattle	Chicago, Illinois
5:00 PM (CST)	Scoring by quarter: 16–30, 36–22, 23–38, 23–35
	Pts: Myers (33); Rebs: Myers, Lovelace (12); Asts: Myers, Ross (4)	Report	Pts: Springer (26); Rebs: Clark (13); Asts: Uzan (10)	Arena: Wintrust Arena

July 21, 2018 Day 13	Los Angeles	130–122	Chicago	Chicago, Illinois
7:30 PM (CST)	Scoring by quarter: 21–23, 30–24, 41–45, 38–30
	Pts: Li. Ball (54); Rebs: Floyd (19); Asts: La. Ball (7)	Report	Pts: Watson (34); Rebs: Dixson (15); Asts: Ingram (8)	Arena: Wintrust Arena

July 24, 2018 Day 14	Dallas	115–81	Philadelphia	Duluth, Georgia
5:00 PM (CST)	Scoring by quarter: 45–21, 13–12, 27–18, 30–30
	Pts: Walker (24); Rebs: McSpadden (10); Asts: McSpadden, M. Morgan (7)	Report	Pts: Buckner (25); Rebs: E. Hall (13); Asts: Johnson (5)	Arena: Infinite Energy Center

July 24, 2018 Day 14	New York	119–114(OT)	Atlanta	Duluth, Georgia
7:30 PM (CST)	Scoring by quarter: 28–24, 23–29, 28–21, 25–30, Overtime: 15–10
	Pts: Kirkham (29); Rebs: C. Brown (10); Asts: Irby (9)	Report	Pts: Boyd (27); Rebs: Butler (13); Asts: Chaney (8)	Arena: Infinite Energy Center

July 26, 2018 Day 15	Chicago	110–134	Seattle	Las Vegas, Nevada
5:00 PM (CST)	Scoring by quarter: 24–34, 28–39, 33–21, 25–40
	Pts: Lyle (29); Rebs: Lyle, Ingram (11); Asts: Lyle, Rieger (5)	Report	Pts: Carmon (27); Rebs: Abdullah-Booker (18); Asts: Uzan (12)	Arena: Orleans Arena

July 26, 2018 Day 15	Houston	153–169	Los Angeles	Las Vegas, Nevada
7:30 PM (CST)	Scoring by quarter: 31–40, 39–27, 50–57, 33–45
	Pts: Hollis (40); Rebs: Myers (14); Asts: Hollis (9)	Report	Pts: Li. Ball (52); Rebs: Mack (10); Asts: La. Ball (20)	Arena: Orleans Arena

July 29, 2018 Day 16	Atlanta	94–109	Dallas	Trenton, New Jersey
5:00 PM (CST)	Scoring by quarter: 23–25, 28–22, 16–37, 27–25
	Pts: Chaney (35); Rebs: Boyd (14); Asts: Boyd, Chaney, J. Hall (4)	Report	Pts: McSpadden (23); Rebs: Wek, Foster (13); Asts: M. Morgan (7)	Arena: CURE Insurance Arena

July 29, 2018 Day 16	New York	84–81(OT)	Philadelphia	Trenton, New Jersey
7:30 PM (CST)	Scoring by quarter: 9–18, 30–17, 21–21, 11–15, Overtime: 13–10
	Pts: C. Brown (24); Rebs: C. Brown (18); Asts: Irby (7)	Report	Pts: Nixon (25); Rebs: E. Hall (17); Asts: Buckner (5)	Arena: CURE Insurance Arena

== All-Star Event ==
On August 3, 2018, the JBA hosted their inaugural All-Star Event at the Quest Multisport in Chicago, Illinois. Prior to the All-Star Game, the league hosted a Three-Point Contest and Slam Dunk Contest. Two days before the event, event contestants and All-Star Game selections were officially revealed to the public.

=== Three-Point Contest ===
Contestants
Pos.	Player	Team
G	Nigel Chaney	Atlanta Ballers
G/F	Harrison Rieger	Chicago Ballers
G	Karlon McSpadden	Dallas Ballers
G	Jordell Ross	Houston Ballers
G	LiAngelo Ball	Los Angeles Ballers
G	Taylor Kirkham	New York Ballers
F/G	Marquis Johnson	Philadelphia Ballers
G	Brandon Willis	Seattle Ballers

Results

Quarterfinals
LiAngelo Ball (Los Angeles)	12
Harrison Rieger (Chicago)	11
Karlon McSpadden (Dallas)	12
Taylor Kirkham (New York)	14
Jordell Ross (Houston)	9
Marquis Johnson (Philadelphia)	6
Brandon Willis (Seattle)	13
Nigel Chaney (Atlanta)	7

Semifinals
LiAngelo Ball (Los Angeles)	8
Taylor Kirkham (New York)	6
Jordell Ross (Houston)	9
Brandon Willis (Seattle)	12

Finals
LiAngelo Ball (Los Angeles)	9
Brandon Willis (Seattle)	18

=== Slam Dunk Contest ===
Contestants
Pos.	Player	Team
G	Fionn Brown	Atlanta Ballers
F	Shaun Lee	Chicago Ballers
G	Demolia Peterson	Dallas Ballers
F	Nicholas Lovelace	Houston Ballers
F/G	Keshaun Mack	Los Angeles Ballers
G	Jameer Killing	New York Ballers
G/F	Shannon Handy	Philadelphia Ballers
G	Anthony Carmon	Seattle Ballers

Results

Quarterfinals
Shaun Lee (Chicago)	45
Anthony Carmon (Seattle)	36
Demolia Peterson (Dallas)	25
Jameer Killing (New York)	28
Keshaun Mack (Los Angeles)
Shannon Handy (Philadelphia)
Nicholas Lovelace (Houston)	44
Fionn Brown (Atlanta)

Semifinals
Shaun Lee (Chicago)
Jameer Killing (New York)
Keshaun Mack (Los Angeles)
Nicholas Lovelace (Houston)

Finals
Shaun Lee (Chicago)	25
Nicholas Lovelace (Houston)	29

=== All-Star Game ===
East
Pos.	Player	Team
G	Jaylen Nixon	Philadelphia Ballers
F	Calvin Brown	New York Ballers
G	Nolan Irby	New York Ballers
F	Corey Boyd	Atlanta Ballers
G	Isom Butler	Atlanta Ballers
G	Nigel Chaney	Atlanta Ballers
G/F	Deon Lyle	Chicago Ballers
G/F	Harrison Rieger	Chicago Ballers
F	Montrell Dixson	Chicago Ballers
G	Lenell Watson	Chicago Ballers
Head coach: Alan Foster; Assistant coach: Karolis Malinauskas

West
Pos.	Player	Team
G	Jordon Myers	Houston Ballers
G/F	Curtis Hollis	Houston Ballers
F/C	Nate Morris	Dallas Ballers
G	Caleal Walker	Dallas Ballers
F/C	Melvin Davis	Los Angeles Ballers
F	Greg Floyd Jr.	Los Angeles Ballers
G/F	LiAngelo Ball	Los Angeles Ballers
G	LaMelo Ball	Los Angeles Ballers
G	Niles Malone	Los Angeles Ballers
F	JaMicheal Morgan	Seattle Ballers
G	Jerell Springer	Seattle Ballers
Head coach: LaVar Ball; Assistant coach: Tito Ortiz

=== Game ===
LiAngelo Ball of the West All-Stars was named co-most valuable player (MVP) along with Deon Lyle of the East All-Stars. Ball recorded 39 points, 15 rebounds, and 7 assists, while Lyle scored a game-high 51 points. LaMelo Ball also recorded a double-double with 42 points and 17 assists.

August 3, 2018
7:00 pm CT

Recap

East All-Stars 189, West All-Stars 202
Scoring by quarter: 35–51, 49–39, 42–58, 63–54
Pts: Lyle (51); Rebs: Lyle, Boyd (11); Asts: Butler (10)	Pts: La. Ball, Hollis (42); Rebs: Li. Ball (15); Asts: La. Ball (17)

Quest Multisport, Chicago, Illinois

== Playoffs ==
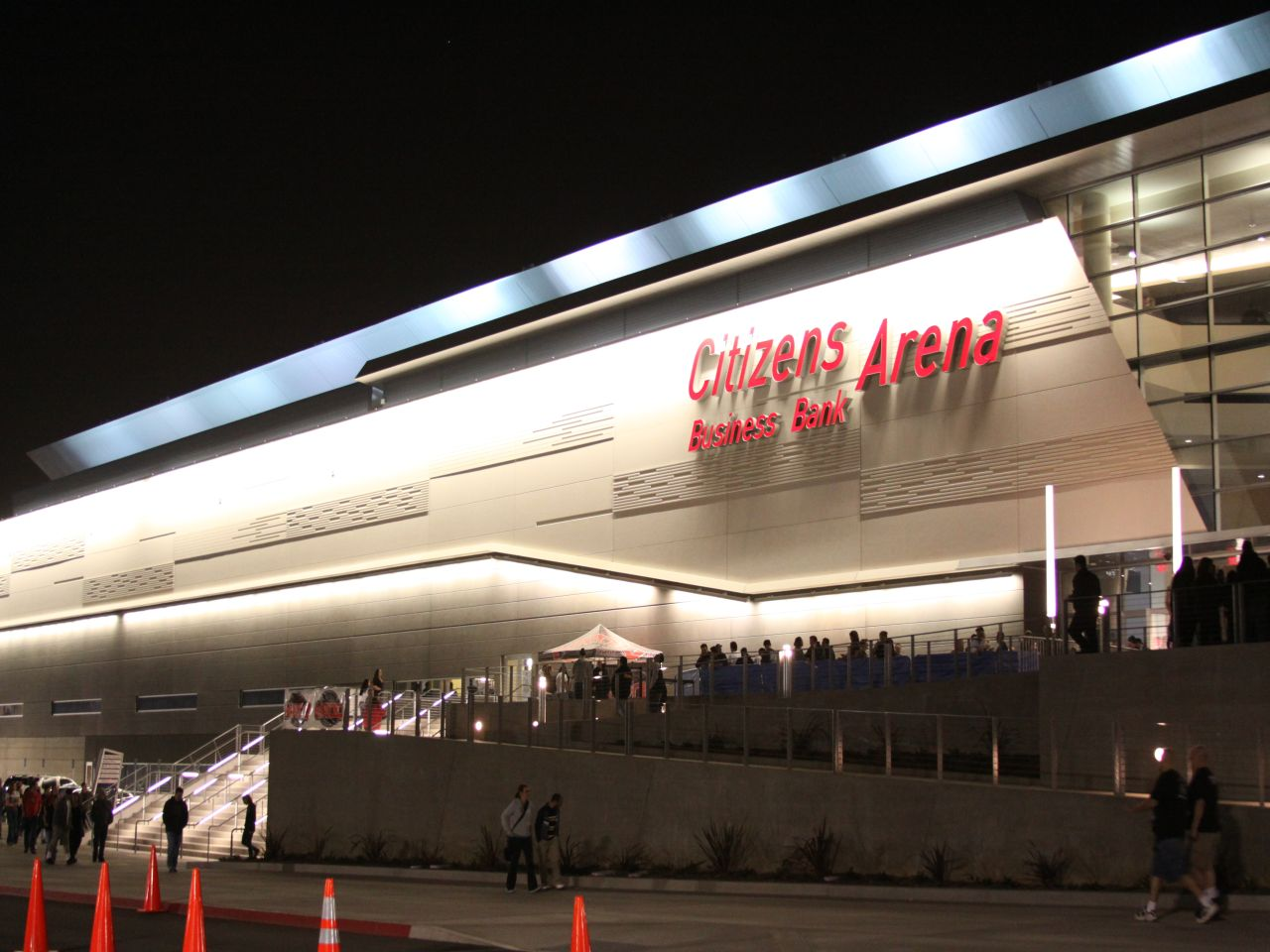
The Citizens Business Bank Arena debuted the inaugural games of the season and hosted the JBA Championship.

=== Championship bracket ===
Venue: Eagle's Nest Arena (Los Angeles, California), Citizens Business Bank Arena (Ontario, California)

Quarterfinals; August 10
1	Los Angeles Ballers	157
8	Philadelphia Ballers	134
4	New York Ballers	93
5	Atlanta Ballers	82
3	Dallas Ballers	105
6	Houston Ballers	106
2	Seattle Ballers	105
7	Chicago Ballers	90

Semifinals; August 11
1	Los Angeles Ballers	127
4	New York Ballers	124
2	Seattle Ballers	129
6	Houston Ballers	106

Championship game August 12
1	Los Angeles Ballers	132
2	Seattle Ballers	121

=== Boxscores ===
==== Quarterfinals ====
August 10, 2018
12:00

Boxscore

New York	93–82	Atlanta
Scoring by quarter: 29–11, 17–23, 25–23, 22–23
Pts: Antoine (24); Rebs: Brown (10); Asts: Irby (8)		Pts: Chaney (22); Rebs: Boyd (13); Asts: Butler (5)

Eagle's Nest Arena, Los Angeles, California

August 10, 2018
2:30

Boxscore

Dallas	105–106 (OT)	Houston
Scoring by quarter: 16–17, 26–20, 27–27, 20–25, Overtime: 16–17
Pts: McSpadden (35); Rebs: Morris (11); Asts: M. Morgan (7)		Pts: Hollis (31); Rebs: Myers (12); Asts: Myers (5)

Eagle's Nest Arena, Los Angeles, California

August 10, 2018
5:00

Boxscore

Seattle	105–90	Chicago
Scoring by quarter: 23–20, 19–13, 36–21, 27–36
Pts: Abdullah-Booker (23); Rebs: Abdullah-Booker (13); Asts: Uzan (5)		Pts: Watson (26); Rebs: Pope (20); Asts: Pope (4)

Eagle's Nest Arena, Los Angeles, California

August 10, 2018
7:30

Boxscore

Los Angeles	157–134	Philadelphia
Scoring by quarter: 36–16, 41–35, 40–38, 40–45
Pts: Li. Ball (58); Rebs: Davis (11); Asts: La. Ball (13)		Pts: Johnson (32); Rebs: Handy (14); Asts: Buckner (10)

Eagle's Nest Arena, Los Angeles, California

==== Semifinals ====
August 11, 2018
5:00

Boxscore

Seattle	129–106	Houston
Scoring by quarter: 29–25, 40–24, 34–28, 26–29
Pts: J. Morgan, Willis (29); Rebs: Carmon (13); Asts: Willis (9)		Pts: Forman (24); Rebs: Hollis (7); Asts: Forman (5)

Eagle's Nest Arena, Los Angeles, California

August 11, 2018
7:30

Boxscore

Los Angeles	127–124	New York
Scoring by quarter: 33–21, 30–40, 33–35, 31–28
Pts: La. Ball (55); Rebs: La. Ball, Floyd (16); Asts: La. Ball (7)		Pts: Killing (32); Rebs: Camara (11); Asts: Antoine (10)

Eagle's Nest Arena, Los Angeles, California

==== JBA Finals ====
August 12, 2018	Los Angeles	132–121	Seattle	Citizens Business Bank Arena, Ontario, California
7:30	Scoring by quarter: 27–27, 38–30, 31–29, 36–35
	Pts: Li. Ball (58); Rebs: Davis (20); Asts: La. Ball (9)	Boxscore	Pts: Springer (32); Rebs: Abdullah-Booker (18); Asts: Carmon (8)

== International season ==
After the JBA Finals, the league selected 14 players to play for the JBA USA Team, which will take part in 28 exhibition games against international competition. The international season began on September 22, 2018, when the JBA USA Team faced the Svendborg Rabbits from Denmark. Los Angeles Ballers head coach Doyle Balthazar served as the JBA USA Team head coach, with Los Angeles assistant coach Rasul Salahuddin and Seattle Ballers head coach Charles O'Bannon assuming assistant roles. The international season was expected to continue in 2019. However, due to a fight LaMelo Ball was involved with against Dzūkija Alytus on October 1, some of the teams that were previously scheduled for the event dropped out of the event, with the international event concluding earlier than the league anticipated. LaMelo later left the team and the league to enter his senior year of high school. In addition to him, a few other also left the team during the tournament.

=== JBA USA Team roster ===
Pos.	Player	Team
G	LaMelo Ball	Los Angeles Ballers
G	LiAngelo Ball	Los Angeles Ballers
F	Corey Boyd	Atlanta Ballers
F	Calvin Brown	New York Ballers
F	Cameron Clark	Seattle Ballers
F/C	Melvin Davis	Los Angeles Ballers
F	Greg Floyd Jr.	Los Angeles Ballers
G/F	Curtis Hollis	Houston Ballers
G/F	Deon Lyle	Chicago Ballers
F	JaMicheal Morgan	Seattle Ballers
F/C	Nate Morris	Dallas Ballers
G	Jordan Ray	Atlanta Ballers
G/F	Harrison Rieger	Chicago Ballers
G	Jerell Springer	Seattle Ballers
F	Nyang Wek	Dallas Ballers
Head coach: Doyle Balthazar; Assistant coaches: Charles O'Bannon and Rasul Salahuddin

=== International games ===
September 22, 2018	JBA USA Team (United States)	120–118	(Denmark) Svendborg Rabbits	Svendborg, Denmark
5:00 PM (CEST)	Scoring by quarter: 32–27, 27–33, 30–30, 31–28
	Pts: Li. Ball (36); Rebs: La. Ball (10); Asts: La. Ball (8)	Boxscore	Pts: Petersen (28); Rebs: Petersen (10); Asts: Ingram (9)	Arena: HK Midt Arena; Attendance: 1,200

September 29, 2018	JBA USA Team (United States)	118–126	(Lithuania) Jonava	Jonava, Lithuania
8:00 PM (EEST)	Scoring by quarter: 26–29, 23–34, 33–35, 36–28
	Pts: Springer (27); Rebs: Li. Ball, Clark (7); Asts: La. Ball (16)	Boxscore	Pts: Furmanavičius (32); Rebs: Ramanauskas (14); Asts: Franklin (12)	Arena: Jonava Sports Arena; Attendance: 1,500; Referees: Mantas Butvilas, Martynas Karaliūnas, Laurynas Gailius

October 1, 2018	JBA USA Team (United States)	116–124	(Lithuania) Dzūkija Alytus	Alytus, Lithuania
7:00 PM (EEST)	Scoring by quarter: 35–21, 33–33, 21–37, 27–33
	Pts: Li. Ball (41); Rebs: Wek (7); Asts: La. Ball (8)	Boxscore	Pts: Jomantas (22); Rebs: Austin, Jomantas (17); Asts: Pačėsas (4)	Arena: Alytus Arena; Attendance: 600; Referees: Andrius Jakimavičius, Tomas Klionauskas, Marius Naruševičius

October 8, 2018	JBA USA Team (United States)	131–118	(Latvia) Liepājas Lauvas	Liepāja, Latvia
7:30 PM (EEST)	Scoring by quarter: 31–35, 40–25, 31–27, 29–31
	Pts: Springer (36); Rebs: Hollis (11); Asts: Ball (14)	Boxscore	Pts: Johnson (36); Rebs: Johnson (11); Asts: Ate (6)	Arena: Liepāja Olympic Centre; Attendance: 1,000; Referees: Jānis Sudmalis, Valters Čerņevskis, Ģirts Splīte

October 10, 2018	JBA USA Team (United States)	135–127(OT)	(Russia) CSKA-2	Moscow, Russia
7:30 PM (MSK)	Scoring by quarter: 38–27, 25–32, 26–28, 29–31, Overtime: 17–9
	Pts: La. Ball (31); Rebs: Hollis (10); Asts: La. Ball (10)	Boxscore	Pts: Khomenko (31); Rebs: Kurbatov (13); Asts: Tonoyan (6)	Arena: CSKA Sport Hall; Attendance: 1,500; Referees: Yaroslav Blokhov, Anton Sazonov, Yakov Tarasov

October 14, 2018	JBA USA Team (United States)	121–114	(Russia) Zenit-Farm	Saint Petersburg, Russia
7:00 PM (MSK)	Scoring by quarter: 29–29, 20–34, 35–30, 37–21
	Pts: La. Ball (44); Rebs: Li. Ball, Hollis (13); Asts: La. Ball (12)	Boxscore	Pts: Yudin (21); Rebs: Yudin (14); Asts: Usoltsev (9)	Arena: Zenit Arena; Attendance: 1,000; Referees: Yaroslav Oreshin, Viktor Kudryakov, Andrey Lugovoy

October 16, 2018	JBA USA Team (United States)	135–123	(Estonia) Avis Utilitas Rapla	Rapla, Estonia
7:00 PM (EEST)
	Pts: La. Ball (38); Rebs: La. Ball, Hollis (11); Asts: La. Ball (8)	Boxscore	Pts: Veideman (38); Rebs: Ilves (8); Asts: Veideman (6)	Arena: Sadolin Sports Hall

October 18, 2018	JBA USA Team (United States)	151–133	(Poland) Polpharma Starogard Gdański	Starogard Gdański, Poland
7:00 PM (CEST)	Scoring by quarter: 47–36, 29–31, 33–37, 42–29
	Pts: Li. Ball (43); Rebs: La. Ball (14); Asts: La. Ball (18)	Boxscore	Pts: Gołębiowski (28); Rebs: Prahl (16); Asts: Davis, Dzierżak (8)	Arena: Skarszewskiego Centrum Sportu; Referees: Jacek Dolski, Tomasz Szczurewski, Krzysztof Tuński

October 24, 2018	JBA USA Team (United States)	117–115	(Germany) Baunach Young Pikes	Baunach, Germany
8:00 PM (CEST)
	Pts: Hollis (40); Rebs: Davis (14); Asts: Unknown	Boxscore	Pts: Šerić (19); Rebs: Šležas (12); Asts: Heckel (9)	Arena: Graf-Stauffenberg Halle

October 30, 2018	JBA USA Team (United States)	163–138	(Belgium) HUBO Limburg United Academy	Houthalen-Helchteren, Belgium
8:00 PM (CEST)
	Pts: Li. Ball (47); Rebs: La. Ball (9); Asts: La. Ball (14)	Boxscore	Pts: D. Souveryns (27); Rebs: N. Kuta (13); Asts: N. Kuta (8)	Arena: Sporthal Lakerveld Arena

November 3, 2018	JBA USA Team (United States)	151–137	(United Kingdom) London Lions	London, England
7:00 PM (BST)
	Pts: La. Ball (43); Rebs: La. Ball (13); Asts: La. Ball (17)	Boxscore	Pts: James (17); Rebs: Spencer (10); Asts: Guede (9)	Arena: Copper Box Arena

November 8, 2018	JBA USA Team (United States)	123–117	(United Kingdom) Loughborough Riders	Leicester, England
7:00 PM (BST)
	Pts: Ray (34); Rebs: Davis (14); Asts: Li. Ball, Clark (7)	Boxscore	Pts: Fava (18); Rebs: Christofis (9); Asts: Unknown	Arena: Morningside Arena

November 10, 2018	JBA USA Team (United States)	140–102	(Turkey) Yeşilyurt SK	Istanbul, Turkey
8:00 PM (TRT)
	Pts: Ray (47); Rebs: Hollis (11); Asts: Hollis (11)	Boxscore	Pts: Yangue (30); Rebs: Yangue (16); Asts: Kata (13)	Arena: Yesilyurt Arena

November 12, 2018	JBA USA Team (United States)	154–130	(Turkey) Sigortam.net İTÜ	Istanbul, Turkey
8:00 PM (TRT)
	Pts: Li. Ball (43); Rebs: Davis (13); Asts: Ray (16)	Boxscore	Pts: Frink (32); Rebs: Alemdaroglu (9); Asts: Say (8)	Arena: Sportingwork Sport Hall

November 15, 2018	JBA USA Team (United States)	122–129	(North Macedonia) KK Rabotnički	Skopje, Macedonia
2:00 PM (Central European Time)
	Pts: Hollis (38); Rebs: Hollis (8); Asts: Ray (20)	Boxscore	Pts: Karadzovski (26); Rebs: unknown Asts: unknown	Arena: Telecom Arena

November 16, 2018	JBA USA Team (United States)	138–133	(Bulgaria) Academic Sofia	Sofia, Bulgaria
3:00 PM (Eastern European Standard Time)
	Pts: Li. Ball (65); Rebs: Hollis (10); Asts: Ray (12)	Boxscore	Pts: Milov (28); Rebs: Ivanov (13); Asts: Ivanov (8)	Arena: Universiada Hall

November 20, 2018	JBA USA Team (United States)	115–101	(Romania) BCM U Pitesti	Pitesti, Romania
7:00 (Eastern European Standard Time)
	Pts: Li. Ball (42); Rebs: Lyle (13); Asts: Hollis (8)	Boxscore	Pts: Korniyenko (24); Rebs: Korniyenko (17); Asts: unknown	Arena: Oprea Arena

== Media ==
For the 2018 season, the JBA aired games through Facebook Live, including All-Star festivities and playoff matches. Allen Bell and Brandon Williams were the official commentators for the season.
