= Jerell Springer =

American basketball player (born 1999)

No. 0 – BC Kavkasia
- Position: Point guard
- League: A League

Personal information
- Born: January 19, 1999 (age 27) Las Vegas, Nevada, U.S.
- Listed height: 6 ft 6 in (1.98 m)
- Listed weight: 180 lb (82 kg)

Career information
- High school: Shadow Ridge (Las Vegas, Nevada); Desert Pines (Las Vegas, Nevada); Planet Athlete (Tempe, Arizona)
- Playing career: 2018–present

Career history
- 2018: Seattle Ballers
- 2020–present: BC Kavkasia

Career highlights
- JBA All-Star (2018)

Jerell Dwayne Springer (born January 19, 1999) is an American basketball player for BC Kavkasia of the Georgia A League. Standing 6 feet 6 inches (1.98 m) and weighing 180 pounds (81.6 kg), he was a top prospect in Nevada at the high school level, attending Shadow Ridge and Desert Pines High School in Las Vegas. Although his senior season at the latter school was beset by eligibility issues, he was a three-star recruit and committed to play college basketball for Southern Utah. However, he chose to not enroll and later decided to join the JBA.

== High school career ==
Springer played three seasons of high school basketball for Shadow Ridge High School in Las Vegas, Nevada. In July 2015, at the Full-Court Press All-West Camp in Norwalk, California, he was among 25 players selected to the All-Star roster. As a junior, Springer averaged 20.4 points, 9.0 rebounds, and 4.0 assists en route to All-League and third-team All-State honors. By the end of the season, he became one of the most sought-after recruits in his state, with scholarship offers from Pacific and Southern Utah.

For his senior year, Springer transferred to Desert Pines High School in Las Vegas. After being declared ineligible to play for his new school, his family hired a lawyer to deal with the eligibility case, which went to district court. Springer said, "It was pretty hard watching knowing it was my final year and I didn't have nothing else to put out there on the table." A temporary court order allowed him to play one game on January 21, 2017, in which he scored seven points against Ed W. Clark High School, shooting 1-of-14 from the field. Despite his absence for the rest of the season, Desert Pines won the Class 3A state championship.

In the same year, Springer impressed college programs playing for his travel team 702 Attack, drawing the attention of UNLV and earning two visits to the campus of BYU. In May 2017, he committed to play for the Southern Utah Thunderbirds under head coach Todd Simon, who said that Springer "embodies what we want the Thunderbird spirit to be as a person and a teammate." However, he instead decided to not enroll and play at the prep level in order to gain more interest from college programs. Springer played an extra year at Planet Athlete Academy in Tempe, Arizona. On December 2, 2017, he recorded 29 points, 9 rebounds, and 5 assists for his team.

== Professional career ==
In April 2018, Springer attended a tryout in Houston, Texas for the Junior Basketball Association (JBA) and was one of seven players chosen for a roster spot in the league, joining the Seattle Ballers. He was praised by former NBA player Ed O'Bannon, a member of the selection committee, who said, "He played hard... His knowledge of the game I thought was great. He was attacking the rim, going after rebounds, controlling the game, that sort of thing." In Seattle's debut game on June 23, 2018, Springer recorded 22 points, 15 rebounds, and 5 assists in a 121–103 win over the Dallas Ballers. A day later, Springer recorded a game-high 48 points in a close 150–145 loss against the Los Angeles Ballers. He was named to the West roster for the JBA All-Star Game. In the championship game, a 132–121 loss to Los Angeles, Springer led Seattle in scoring with 32 points.

After the end of the inaugural JBA season, Springer was one of the 14 players included in the JBA's USA Team in their international tour for 2018. During the USA JBA Team's international tour debut on September 22, Springer put up 8 points and 7 rebounds in a close 120–118 win over the Svendborg Rabbits of Denmark. On October 8, he led all scorers with 36 points in a 131–118 win over BK Liepājas Lauvas of the Latvian Basketball League. Springer contributed 27 points on 11-of-19 shooting with eight rebounds and three steals in a 135–127 win over CSKA-2 on October 11.

In January 2020, Springer signed a one-year deal with BC Kavkasia of the Georgia A League. He was named A League Player of the week on March 13, 2020, after posting 29 points and 11 rebounds against Burji.
