= Orleans Arena =

Multipurpose indoor arena in Nevada

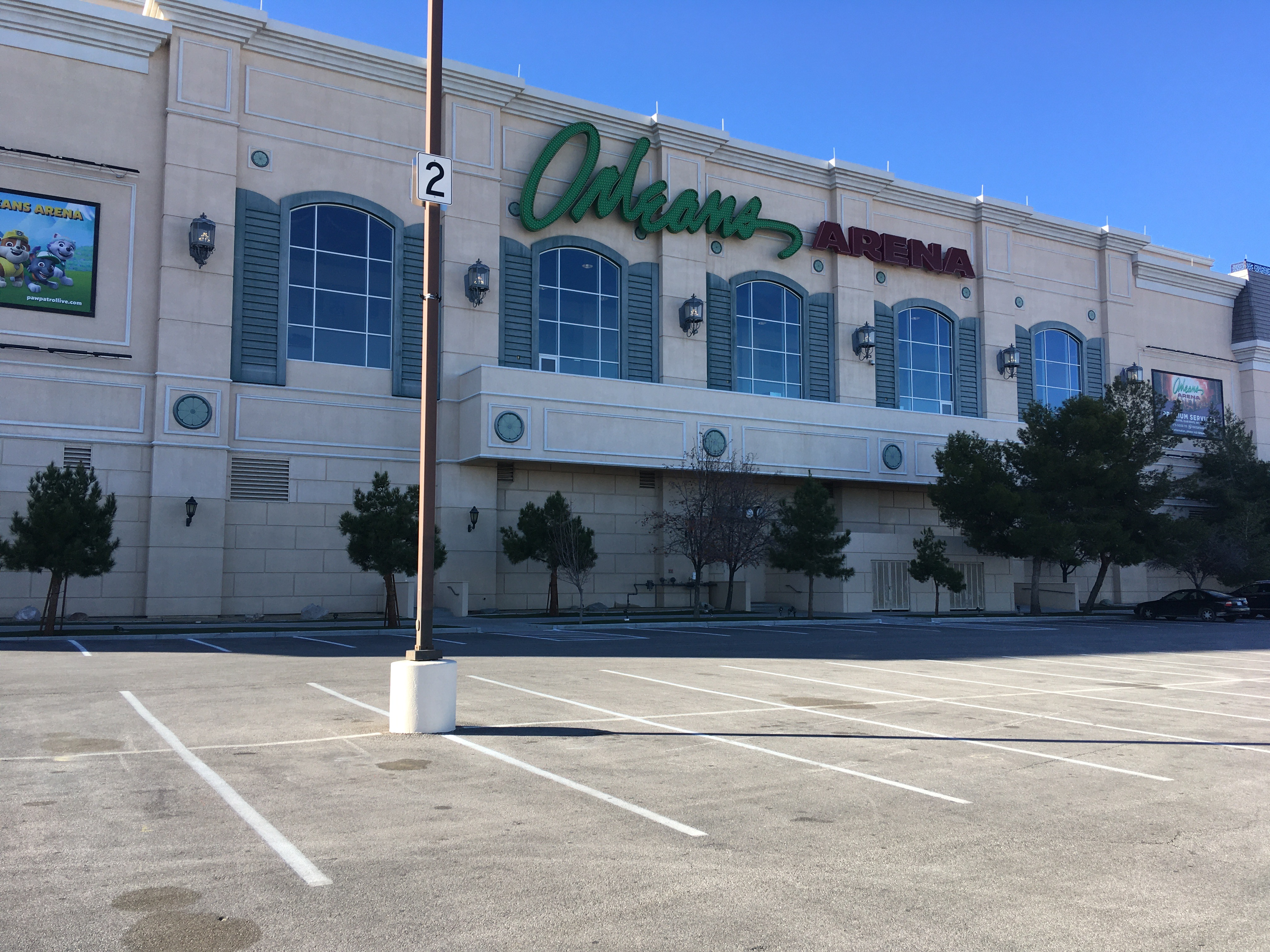
- Orleans Arena (2019)

- Location in Nevada Location in the United States Location in North America
- Interactive map of Orleans Arena
- Address: 4500 West Tropicana Avenue
- Location: Paradise, Nevada, U.S.
- Coordinates: 36°6′21″N 115°12′8″W
- Owner: Boyd Gaming
- Operator: Boyd Gaming
- Capacity: Boxing: 9,500; Concert: 8,921; Ice hockey: 7,773; Basketball: 7,471; Rodeo: 5,736; Tennis: 5,000
- Surface: Multi-surface

Construction
- Groundbreaking: February 5, 2002; 24 years ago
- Opened: May 25, 2003; 23 years ago
- Cost: $85 million
- Architects: Sink Combs Dethlefs; Klai Juba
- Structural engineers: John A. Martin & Associates
- Services engineer: JBA Consulting Engineers
- General contractor: Tiberti Construction

Tenants
- Las Vegas Wranglers (ECHL) (2003–2014); Las Vegas Gladiators (AFL) (2007); Las Vegas Sin (LFL) (2011–2013); Las Vegas Legends (MASL) (2012–2016); Vegas Rollers (WTT) (2019); Henderson Silver Knights (AHL) (2021–2022); Las Vegas Rockers (IAL) (2026–present)

Website
- www.orleansarena.com

Orleans Arena is a 9,500-seat multi-purpose arena in Paradise, Nevada, in the Las Vegas Valley. It is located at the Orleans Hotel and Casino and is operated by Coast Casinos, a subsidiary of Boyd Gaming Corporation.

The arena is the home to the Vegas Rollers of World TeamTennis since 2019. It is also an occasional home for the UNLV Rebels basketball team when the Thomas & Mack Center is in use. The arena was the home of the Las Vegas Wranglers ice hockey team from 2003 to 2014, the Las Vegas Gladiators arena football team in 2007, as well as the Las Vegas Sin women's football team.

In 2020, the Vegas Golden Knights announced it was purchasing and relocating an American Hockey League (AHL) franchise. The Henderson Silver Knights played two seasons at Orleans Arena until the club's new 6,000-seat arena was completed in Henderson, Nevada in March 2022.

== Notable events ==
- On July 12, 2003, Ricardo Mayorga retained The Ring welterweight championship with a majority decision over Vernon Forrest, and Zab Judah defeated Demarcus Corley on the undercard.
- The first Las Vegas Wranglers game at the Orleans Arena was on October 10, 2003, where a crowd of 2,817 saw the Wranglers defeat the Bakersfield Condors, 4–2, in an exhibition game.
- The Stanley Cup visited Orleans Arena on November 25, 2005.
- In November 2006, the arena began hosting the Las Vegas Invitational, a pre-season college basketball tournament. It was the first event of its kind to be held at a venue connected to a casino with a sports book, the Las Vegas (College Basketball) Invitational on November 22–26, 2006. The West Coast Conference has held its basketball tournaments for men and women at the venue since 2009, the first Division I conference tournament to do so at that type of venue. The Western Athletic Conference has held its men's and women's tournaments at Orleans Arena since 2011.
- In 2007, the Las Vegas Gladiators of the Arena Football League moved to the arena from the Thomas & Mack Center. The move failed to increase community interest and the team moved to Cleveland, Ohio, in 2008.
- From February 26–28, 2009, the NIAA State Basketball Championship was held at the Orleans Arena. All classifications (1A–4A) attended and played at the venue.
- On November 26, 2011, the UNLV men's basketball team upset No. 1 ranked North Carolina at the arena.
- On February 5, 2012, the arena played host to the LFL Lingerie Bowl IX. Los Angeles defeated Philadelphia 28–6.
- Between July and October 2015, Global Force Wrestling taped the pilot episodes of its planned TV series GFW Amped at the Orleans Arena.
- Between March 31 – April 8, 2018, the Orleans Arena hosted the 2018 World Men's Curling Championship. The Swedish team led by Niklas Edin beat the defending champions Canada led by Brad Gushue.
- On July 26, 2018, the Orleans Arena hosted the penultimate regular season games for the 2018 JBA season. At 5:00 P.M., the Seattle Ballers defeated the Chicago Ballers 134–110, while the Los Angeles Ballers (led by LiAngelo and LaMelo Ball) and the Houston Ballers (led by Curtis Hollis and Jordon Myers) recorded a high-scoring match soon afterward, with Los Angeles winning 169–153.
- During the 2020–2021 figure skating season, the 2020 Guaranteed Rate Skate America and the 2021 U.S. Figure Skating Championships were held at the Orleans Arena in a "bubble" at the casino.
- From April 2–10, 2022, the Orleans Arena hosted the 2022 World Men's Curling Championship. The 3-time defending champions Sweden led by Niklas Edin beat the Canadian team led by Brad Gushue.
- On November 5, 2022, ABS-CBN's noontime variety show ASAP staged a concert live at the Orleans Arena. It was the show's first international show since the onset of the COVID-19 pandemic's lockdowns.
- From March 28-29, 2026, Orleans Arena hosted the 2025-26 Major League Indoor Soccer and Women's Major League Indoor Soccer playoff matches.

Events and tenants
| Preceded by Thomas & Mack Center | Home of the Las Vegas Gladiators; 2007 | Succeeded by Rocket Mortgage FieldHouse |
| Preceded by AT&T Center | Home of the Henderson Silver Knights; 2020–present | Succeeded by Dollar Loan Center |
