= Semaj Booker =

American basketball player (born 1997)

Personal information
- Born: June 25, 1997 (age 29) Lakewood, Washington, U.S.
- Listed height: 6 ft 5 in (1.96 m)
- Listed weight: 181 lb (82 kg)

Career information
- High school: Lincoln (Tacoma, Washington); Curtis (University Place, Washington); Clover Park (Lakewood, Washington)
- Playing career: 2018–2018
- Position: Shooting guard / small forward

Career history
- 2018: Seattle Ballers

Semaj Booker (born June 25, 1997) is an American former professional basketball player and former runaway child from Lakewood, Washington. He gained national attention in 2007, at age nine, for escaping from his home in Lakewood to San Antonio, Texas on his own, traveling by car as a driver and by airplane as a passenger. Booker grew up to become a standout high school basketball player, attending four different schools, including Curtis Senior High School and Clover Park High School. He most recently played for the Seattle Ballers of the Junior Basketball Association (JBA).

== Early life and runaway attempts ==
Booker was born to Sakinah Booker, a single mother, and had three brothers, including Demarius, and a younger sister. According to his mother, he regularly attempted to escape his mother's apartment in Lakewood, Washington to be with a father figure in his grandfather, who lived in Dallas, Texas. Booker's mother also claimed that he "hated" his neighborhood.

On January 14, 2007, he stole a 1986 Acura car from a neighbor, driving it up to 90 miles per hour (145 km/h) before crashing during a police chase. In the following morning, after being excused from juvenile detention, Booker traveled to Seattle–Tacoma International Airport on a bus, without his mother's knowledge. He received a boarding pass from Southwest Airlines for a flight to San Antonio, Texas via Phoenix, Arizona, after lying that he was a 12-year-old with the last name "Williams" and that his mother was already in the boarding area. However, in San Antonio, he was stopped after attempting to board another flight to Dallas.

The incident gained the attention of Norm Dicks, the local U. S. Representative, who said, "If a 9-year-old can exploit this (air travel) security system, we are going to have to look into the procedures." The Washington Post labeled Booker possibly "the most persistent, most creative and most publicized 9-year-old runaway in the history of the Pacific Northwest," while Time magazine included him in an article about "5 Amazing Runaway Kid Stories" alongside Harry Houdini and Benjamin Franklin. Booker was additionally featured on Dr. Phil and Inside Edition.

Booker was later involved in another runaway attempt to Texas through the SeaTac/Airport station. Additional actions put him in juvenile detention and eventually led to him and his siblings being placed in a foster home. Booker later escaped from his foster home, eventually returning to his mother's home. In his middle school years, during which he lived in Texas and North Carolina, Booker began playing organized basketball.

== Basketball career ==
=== High school ===
Throughout his high school tenure, he would go to four different campuses in Washington, at least one per each year of a regular high school tenure. In his sophomore season, he played for Lincoln High School in Tacoma. As a junior, he transferred to Curtis Senior High School in University Place, Washington. He also worked part-time as a referee at the time. He received a letter of interest from San Diego State University while at Curtis. Before his 18th birthday at the end of his junior year, he was involved with a serious fight that led to his suspension from school, and he attended summer school at Oakland Alternative High School in Tacoma. In his senior year, Booker transferred to Clover Park High School in Lakewood, Washington. During what would be his last year of high school, Booker would average 13.6 points, 7.3 rebounds, 2.0 steals, 1.6 assists, and 1.5 blocks per game in 20 games played. He gained interest from both Tacoma Community College and Evergreen State College, but Booker veered away from those places, eventually stopping himself from going to classes at Clover Park altogether at one point. He projected to go to a preparatory school in Illinois to finish high school properly, but couldn't in part because of the birth of his son, Mathayus King Blue-Booker, on December 22, 2016, and partially because of an arrest he had in February 2017, which would lead to a court case on July that year.

=== Professional ===
Before making the move to play professionally, Booker played in a recreational league. On April 7, 2018, Booker would be one of about 50 or 100 people to officially travel to Garfield High School to tryout for the Seattle Ballers, one of eight teams created for the newly founded Junior Basketball Association (JBA). After the tryouts for Seattle concluded, Booker was named one of four players (at the time) to be confirmed for the newly formed team. He would make his professional debut for the JBA on June 23 against the Dallas Ballers at the H&PE Arena in Houston, Texas. In that game, he recorded 12 points, 4 rebounds, 3 assists, a steal, and a block as a starter in a blowout 121–103 win over the Dallas Ballers. In his next game a day later, he went on to become a bench player for Seattle in a 150–145 loss to the Los Angeles Ballers, which featured premiere player LaMelo Ball.

== Assault charge ==
In July 2019, Booker was involved in a road rage incident in Pierce County, Washington. According to the victim, Booker pulled up in a white sedan behind the man and said, "You cut me off and I have my kid in the car." Booker then allegedly punched the victim through the window, opened the door, and continued to punch him about 20 times. Booker then drove away when the traffic light changed. He was charged with second-degree assault in November.
