= Semaj =

Semaj is a masculine given name. It is James spelled backwards. Notable people with the name include:

- Semaj Booker (born 1997), American basketball player
- Semaj Christon (born 1992), American basketball player
- Semaj Morgan (born 2005), American football player

== See also ==
- SEMAJ, a name for the SEMA4D protein
