= 2017–18 UTSA Roadrunners men's basketball team =

American college basketball season

2017–18 UTSA Roadrunners men's basketball

CIT, Quarterfinals
- Conference: Conference USA
- Record: 20–15 (11–7 C-USA)
- Head coach: Steve Henson (2nd season)
- Assistant coaches: Mike Peck; Scott Thompson; Adam Hood
- Home arena: Convocation Center

2017–18 Conference USA men's basketball standings
	Conf.				Overall
Team	W		L	PCT	W		L	PCT
Middle Tennessee	16	–	2	.889	25	–	8	.758
Old Dominion	15	–	3	.833	25	–	7	.781
Western Kentucky	14	–	4	.778	27	–	11	.711
Marshall †	12	–	6	.667	25	–	11	.694
UTSA	11	–	7	.611	20	–	15	.571
UAB	10	–	8	.556	20	–	13	.606
North Texas	8	–	10	.444	20	–	18	.526
FIU	8	–	10	.444	14	–	18	.438
Southern Miss	7	–	11	.389	16	–	18	.471
Louisiana Tech	7	–	11	.389	17	–	16	.515
Florida Atlantic	6	–	12	.333	12	–	19	.387
UTEP	6	–	12	.333	11	–	20	.355
Rice	4	–	14	.222	7	–	24	.226
Charlotte	2	–	16	.111	6	–	23	.207
† 2018 C-USA Tournament winner

The 2017–18 UTSA Roadrunners men's basketball team represented the University of Texas at San Antonio during the 2017–18 NCAA Division I men's basketball season. The Roadrunners, led by second-year head coach Steve Henson, played their home games at the Convocation Center as members of Conference USA. They finished the season 20–15, 11–7 in C-USA play to finish in fifth place. They defeated UTEP in the first round of the C-USA tournament before losing in the quarterfinals to Marshall. They were invited to the CollegeInsider.com Tournament where they defeated Lamar in the first round and received a second round bye before losing in the quarterfinals to Sam Houston State.

== Previous season ==
The Roadrunners finished the 2016–17 season 14–19, 8–10 in C-USA play to finish in the ninth place. They defeated Western Kentucky in the first round of the C-USA tournament before losing to top-seeded Middle Tennessee.

== Offseason ==
=== Departures ===
Name	Number	Pos.	Height	Weight	Year	Hometown	Reason for departure
Terrell Scruggs	0	F	6'5"	195	Senior	Fresno, TX	Graduated
Jeff Beverly	1	F	6'6"	250	RS Junior	League City, TX	Walk-on; graduate transferred to Iowa State
J. R. Harris	2	G	6'4"	170	Senior	Baton Rouge, LA	Graduated
Gino Littles	3	G	6'0"	160	Junior	Phoenix, AZ	Graduate transferred to Northern Arizona
Christian Wilson	10	G	6'2"	170	Junior	Baton Rouge, LA	Transferred
Bola Alade	14	G	6'4"	195	RS Sophomore	Plano, TX	Walk-on; didn't return
Lucas O'Brien	15	C	6'10"	245	RS Senior	Chandler, AZ	Graduated
A. J. Cockrell	33	F	6'8"	230	Sophomore	Tulsa, OK	Transferred to Connors State College
Nick Billingsley	34	G	6'4"	185	Senior	Omaha, NE	Graduated

=== Incoming transfers ===
Name	Number	Pos.	Height	Weight	Year	Hometown	Previous School
Deon Lyle	1	G	6'5"	190	Junior	Norton, KS	Junior college transferred from Cloud County CC
Dante Buford	21	F	6'7"	221	RS Junior	Jacksonville, FL	Transferred from Oklahoma. Under NCAA transfer rules, Buford will have to sit out for the 2017–18 season. Will have two years of remaining eligibility.
Toby Van Ry	41	C	6'10"	210	RS Junior	Fort Collins, CO	Junior college transferred to Northwest Technical College

=== Class of 2017 recruits ===
College recruiting information
Name	Hometown	School	Height	Weight	Commit date
Adrian Rodriquez; PF	Tulsa, OK	Tulsa Union High School	6 ft 6 in (1.98 m)	N/A	Oct 1, 2016
Adrian Rodriquez; PF	Recruit ratings: Scout: Rivals: (NR)				
Jhivvan Jackson; PG	Trinity, TX	Trinity High School	5 ft 10 in (1.78 m)	160 lb (73 kg)	Oct 24, 2016
Jhivvan Jackson; PG	Recruit ratings: Scout: Rivals: (NR)				
Keaton Wallace; PG	Richardson, TX	Richardson High School	6 ft 3 in (1.91 m)	170 lb (77 kg)	Jan 24, 2017
Keaton Wallace; PG	Recruit ratings: Scout: Rivals: (NR)				
Overall recruit ranking:
Note: In many cases, Scout, Rivals, 247Sports, On3, and ESPN may conflict in their listings of height and weight.; In these cases, the average was taken. ESPN grades are on a 100-point scale.; Sources: "2017 Team Ranking". Rivals.

=== Class of 2018 recruits ===
College recruiting information (2018)
Name	Hometown	School	Height	Weight	Commit date
Tamir Bynum; PG	Houston, TX	Lamar High School	5 ft 11 in (1.80 m)	155 lb (70 kg)	Jul 26, 2016
Tamir Bynum; PG	Recruit ratings: Scout: Rivals: (NR)				
Adokiye Iyaye; SG	Oklahoma City, OK	Putnam City North High School	6 ft 3 in (1.91 m)	165 lb (75 kg)	Jun 26, 2017
Adokiye Iyaye; SG	Recruit ratings: Scout: Rivals: (NR)				
Overall recruit ranking:
Note: In many cases, Scout, Rivals, 247Sports, On3, and ESPN may conflict in their listings of height and weight.; In these cases, the average was taken. ESPN grades are on a 100-point scale.; Sources: "2018 Team Ranking". Rivals.

=== Class of 2019 recruits ===
College recruiting information (2019)
Name	Hometown	School	Height	Weight	Commit date
Darian Gibson; PG	Houston, TX	Spring Woods High School	6 ft 3 in (1.91 m)	165 lb (75 kg)	Sep 18, 2016
Darian Gibson; PG	Recruit ratings: Scout: Rivals: (NR)				
Overall recruit ranking:
Note: In many cases, Scout, Rivals, 247Sports, On3, and ESPN may conflict in their listings of height and weight.; In these cases, the average was taken. ESPN grades are on a 100-point scale.; Sources: "2019 Team Ranking". Rivals.

== Roster ==
2017–18 UTSA Roadrunners men's basketball team
Players
Coaches

Pos.	#	Name	Height	Weight	Year	Previous school	Hometown
G	1	Deon Lyle	6 ft 5 in (1.96 m)	190 lb (86 kg)	Jr	Norton Community HS; Cloud County CC	Hastings, NE
G	2	Jhivvan Jackson	6 ft 0 in (1.83 m)	160 lb (73 kg)	Fr	Trinity HS	Bayamón, PR
G	3	Byron Frohnen	6 ft 6 in (1.98 m)	215 lb (98 kg)	So	Bishop Gorman HS	Las Vegas, NV
G	4	Kyle Massie (W)	5 ft 10 in (1.78 m)	160 lb (73 kg)	Jr	O'Connor HS	Helotes, TX
G	5	Giovanni De Nicolao	6 ft 3 in (1.91 m)	175 lb (79 kg)	So	I.I.S.I. Newton School	Camposampiero, Italy
F	10	Mitar Stanojević	6 ft 7 in (2.01 m)	200 lb (91 kg)	So	Creating Young Minds Academy	Belgrade, Serbia
G	11	Austin Karrer	6 ft 4 in (1.93 m)	190 lb (86 kg)	Sr	Canyon HS	New Braunfels, TX
F	21	Dante Buford (I)	6 ft 7 in (2.01 m)	220 lb (100 kg)	RS Jr	Arlington Country Day; Oklahoma	Jacksonville, FL
G	22	Keaton Wallace	6 ft 3 in (1.91 m)	170 lb (77 kg)	Fr	Richardson HS	Dallas, TX
F	25	Nick Allen	6 ft 8 in (2.03 m)	215 lb (98 kg)	Jr	Willow Canyon HS	Surprise, AZ
F	31	Kendall Ramlal (W)	6 ft 8 in (2.03 m)	225 lb (102 kg)	RS Sr	Episcopal HS; Houston	Houston, TX
C	32	James Ringholt	6 ft 10 in (2.08 m)	230 lb (104 kg)	Sr	Brisbane Boys' College	Rockhampton, Australia
G	35	George Willborn III	6 ft 3 in (1.91 m)	195 lb (88 kg)	So	De La Salle Institute	Chicago, IL
F	41	Toby Van Ry	6 ft 10 in (2.08 m)	210 lb (95 kg)	RS Jr	Fort Collins HS; Northwest Technical College	Fort Collins, CO

Head coach

- Steve Henson (Kansas State)

Assistant coach(es)

- Mike Peck (Northwood)
- Scott Thompson (Mississippi)
- Adam Hood (Air Force)

Legend

- (C) Team captain
- (S) Suspended
- (I) Ineligible
- (W) Walk-on
- Injured
- Current redshirt

Roster

== Schedule and results ==
Date time, TV	Rank^{#}	Opponent^{#}	Result	Record	Site (attendance) city, state
Exhibition
Nov 5, 2017*; 6:15 pm		at Sam Houston State; Hurricane Relief for Houston Fund	W 89–76		Bernard Johnson Coliseum (351); Huntsville, TX
Nov 7, 2017*; 7:00 pm		Southeastern Oklahoma State	W 79–67		Convocation Center; San Antonio, TX
Non-conference regular season
Nov 12, 2017*; 3:00 pm		East Central	W 92–59	1–0	Convocation Center (651); San Antonio, TX
Nov 15, 2017*; 7:00 pm, KCWX-TV		Texas State; I-35 Rivalry	W 79–78	2–0	Convocation Center (3,224); San Antonio, TX
Nov 17, 2017*; 1:00 pm		vs. Coastal Carolina; The Islands of the Bahamas Showcase quarterfinals	L 69–83	2–1	Kendal Isaac Memorial Gymnasium (204); Nassau, Bahamas
Nov 18, 2017*; 10:00 am		vs. Bradley; The Islands of the Bahamas Showcase consolation 2nd round	L 69–71	2–2	Kendal Isaac Memorial Gymnasium (247); Nassau, Bahamas
Nov 19, 2017*; 10:00 am		vs. James Madison; The Islands of the Bahamas Showcase 7th place game	W 90–77	3–2	Kendal Isaac Memorial Gymnasium (201); Nassau, Bahamas
Nov 24, 2017*; 7:00 pm		Texas A&M–Corpus Christi	W 72–58	4–2	Convocation Center (965); San Antonio, TX
Nov 28, 2017*; 7:00 pm, ESPN3		at Tulsa	L 96–100	4–3	Reynolds Center (3,237); Tulsa, OK
Nov 30, 2017*; 7:00 pm		Ottawa (AZ)	W 125–64	5–3	Convocation Center (714); San Antonio, TX
Dec 2, 2017*; 8:00 pm		at Utah Valley	L 80–88	5–4	UCCU Center (2,762); Orem, UT
Dec 4, 2017*; 7:00 pm, FSOK		at Oklahoma	L 85–97	5–5	Lloyd Noble Center (8,793); Norman, OK
Dec 9, 2017*; 7:00 pm, KCWX-TV		Houston Baptist	W 87–71	6–5	Convocation Center (1,040); San Antonio, TX
Dec 16, 2017*; 7:00 pm, KCWX-TV		Bethany	W 95–67	7–5	Convocation Center (838); San Antonio, TX
Dec 20, 2017*; 7:00 pm, BTN		at Nebraska	L 94–104	7–6	Pinnacle Bank Arena (10,032); Lincoln, NE
Conference USA regular season
Dec 28, 2017; 7:00 pm		Rice	W 79–66	8–6 (1–0)	Convocation Center (1,163); San Antonio, TX
Dec 30, 2017; 7:00 pm, KCWX-TV		North Texas	L 71–72	8–7 (1–1)	Convocation Center (1,130); San Antonio, TX
Jan 4, 2018; 7:00 pm, Stadium		at Louisiana Tech	W 78–76	9–7 (2–1)	Thomas Assembly Center (3,159); Ruston, LA
Jan 6, 2018; 4:00 pm		at Southern Miss	L 83–93	9–8 (2–2)	Thomas Assembly Center (1,834); Hattiesburg, MS
Jan 11, 2018; 7:00 pm		FIU	L 76–79	9–9 (2–3)	Convocation Center (1,218); San Antonio, TX
Jan 13, 2018; 2:00 pm		Florida Atlantic	L 69–73	9–10 (2–4)	Convocation Center (985); San Antonio, TX
Jan 20, 2018; 3:00 pm		UTEP	W 65–61	10–10 (3–4)	Convocation Center (2,210); San Antonio, TX
Jan 25, 2018; 6:30 pm, Stadium		at Middle Tennessee	L 51–75	10–11 (3–5)	Murphy Center (5,010); Murfreesboro, TN
Jan 27, 2018; 7:00 pm, ESPN3		at UAB	W 82–70	11–11 (4–5)	Bartow Arena (4,259); Birmingham, AL
Feb 1, 2018; 7:00 pm, beIN		Marshall	W 81–77	12–11 (5–5)	Convocation Center (1,042); San Antonio, TX
Feb 3, 2018; 7:00 pm, FCS		Western Kentucky	W 74–63	13–11 (6–5)	Convocation Center (1,305); San Antonio, TX
Feb 10, 2018; 3:00 pm		at UTEP	W 63–59	14–11 (7–5)	Don Haskins Center (6,335); El Paso, TX
Feb 15, 2018; 7:00 pm, beIN		at Old Dominion	L 62–100	14–12 (7–6)	Ted Constant Convocation Center (5,813); Norfolk, VA
Feb 17, 2018; 6:00 pm		at Charlotte	W 97–89 ^{OT}	15–12 (8–6)	Dale F. Halton Arena (3,939); Charlotte, NC
Feb 22, 2018; 7:00 pm		Southern Miss	W 64–56	16–12 (9–6)	Convocation Center (1,082); San Antonio, TX
Feb 24, 2018; 7:00 pm, KCWX-TV		Louisiana Tech	W 74–64	17–12 (10–6)	Convocation Center (1,624); San Antonio, TX
Mar 1, 2018; 7:00 pm		at North Texas	L 62–80	17–13 (10–7)	The Super Pit (3,627); Denton, TX
Mar 3, 2018; 7:00 pm, ESPN3		at Rice	W 79–60	18–13 (11–7)	Tudor Fieldhouse (3,738); Houston, TX
Conference USA tournament
Mar 7, 2018; 6:30 pm, Stadium	(5)	vs. (12) UTEP; First round	W 71–58	19–13	The Ford Center at The Star; Frisco, TX
Mar 8, 2018; 6:30 pm, Stadium	(5)	vs. (4) Marshall; Quarterfinals	L 81–95	19–14	The Ford Center at The Star; Frisco, TX
CIT
Mar 14, 2018*; 7:00 pm		Lamar; First round	W 76–69	20–14	Convocation Center (1,012); San Antonio, TX
Mar 22, 2018*; 7:00 pm		Sam Houston State; Quarterfinals	L 69–76	20–15	Convocation Center (1,352); San Antonio, TX
*Non-conference game. ^{#}Rankings from AP Poll. (#) Tournament seedings in parentheses. All times are in Central Time. Source
