= Harrison Rieger =

American basketball player

Brujos Izalca
- Position: Shooting guard
- League: Liga Superior de Baloncesto de El Salvador

Personal information
- Born: October 5, 1998 (age 28)
- Listed height: 6 ft 4 in (1.93 m)
- Listed weight: 195 lb (88 kg)

Career information
- High school: Moorestown (Moorestown, New Jersey)
- College: Camden CC (2017–2018)
- Playing career: 2018–present

Career history
- 2018: Chicago Ballers
- 2019–2020: Halcones de Sonzacate
- 2020–2021: Juayua
- 2021–present: Brujos Izalca

Harrison Joseph Rieger (born October 5, 1998) is an American professional basketball player for Brujos Izalca of the Liga Superior de Baloncesto de El Salvador. He competed for Moorestown High School and Camden County College. In 2018, he joined the Chicago Ballers of the Junior Basketball Association

== High school career ==
Rieger played for Moorestown High School in his hometown of Moorestown, New Jersey, where he was coached by Shawn Anstey. He played alongside his twin brother Hunter, who was more of a track athlete. According to The Philadelphia Inquirer, Harrison is "a clever player with a good outside shot and knack for getting to the rim." As a senior, he averaged 12.2 points and 8.5 rebounds per game. Rieger was named to the First Team All Liberty Division and Second Team All Group as a senior. He was selected the West's MVP in the Al Carino All-Star Boys Basketball Game. He was an Honorable Mention All-South Jersey selection by the Philadelphia Inquirer.

== College career ==
In his freshman season of college, Rieger played at Camden County College competing in the National Junior College Athletic Association (NJCAA). Rieger scored a career-high 19 points in his second game on November 4, 2017, a 93–84 win against Passaic County Community College. He matched his career-high with 19 points in a 75–61 win against Sussex County Community College on November 18, 2017. On the season, Rieger averaged 11.0 points, 6.8 rebounds, and 2.5 assists per game while shooting 43.9 percent from the field.

== Professional career ==
In May 2018 it was announced that Rieger would join the Chicago Ballers of the Junior Basketball Association (JBA). He joined the team after trying out in Philadelphia, intrigued by the promise of the new league. Rieger averaged 19 points and 9.3 rebounds per game in his first season for Chicago. In September 2018, Rieger was named to the JBA's USA Select team as one of the top 13 players in the league. The team played exhibition matches throughout Europe, which Rieger greatly enjoyed. During a stop in Poland, Rieger dunked over JBA founder LaVar Ball.

On February 16, 2019, he signed with Halcones de Sonzacate of the El Salvador league. Rieger was the youngest American in the league and remarked that the league was more physical than he was used to, but he managed to post 16 points and 8 rebounds per game. He was named to the first-team All-League. For his second season, Rieger joined Juayua in El Salvador. He averaged 21.9 points and 14.7 rebounds per game and made 31 three-pointers in 18 games. In early March 2020, he hyperextended his knee in a pickup game, resulting in a partial tear. In 2021, Rieger joined Brujos Izalca of the El Salvador league.
