= Greg Floyd Jr. =

American basketball player (born 1999)

Personal information
- Born: May 10, 1999 (age 27) Las Vegas, Nevada, U.S.
- Listed height: 6 ft 9 in (2.06 m)
- Listed weight: 200 lb (91 kg)

Career information
- High school: Clark (Las Vegas, Nevada); Desert Pines (Las Vegas, Nevada); Middlebrooks Academy (Los Angeles, California)
- College: Antelope Valley CC (2017–2018)
- NBA draft: 2019: undrafted
- Playing career: 2018–2019

Career history
- 2018: Los Angeles Ballers

Gregory Floyd Jr. (born May 10, 1999) is an American former professional basketball player who last played for the Los Angeles Ballers of the Junior Basketball Association (JBA). He played for three different schools at the high school level, emerging as a four-star recruit and one of the top-ranked prospects in Nevada while at Desert Pines High School in Las Vegas. Despite receiving several NCAA Division I offers, he was considered academically ineligible after his grades plummeted due to the death of his sister, continuing his career at Antelope Valley College before moving to the JBA.

== High school career ==
Floyd began his high school years at Ed W. Clark High School in Las Vegas, Nevada, earning few minutes as a freshman, but helping his team win the Division I-A state title. On January 19, 2014, he scored a season-high 10 points against Western High School. Floyd continued to see limited playing time in his sophomore season with Clark, causing him to transfer to Desert Pines High School in Las Vegas. However, he was ruled ineligible to play for his new school in his second year. He rapidly rose in profile leading up to and during his junior season at Desert Pines.

At the Pangos Spring Spectacular in April 2015, with his Las Vegas Knicks travel team, Floyd averaged 15.5 points, 10.3 rebounds and 5.2 assists, prompting offers from various colleges, including Seton Hall and USC. He held initial offers from several mid-major programs. In July, recruiting website Rivals.com included Floyd among eight "breakout players" at the Under Armour All-America Camp.

For the 2015–16 season, the Las Vegas Sun considered Desert Pines, led by Floyd, as the favorite to win the Division I-A state championship. By the beginning of his junior season, Floyd held over 20 scholarship offers, despite his meager experience at the varsity level. He scored 25 points and grabbed 13 rebounds on December 15, 2015, in a win over Sunrise Mountain High School. By February 2016, he was averaging 15 points, 8 rebounds, and 3 assists, gaining offers from Georgia, Pittsburgh, and Washington. On September 7, 2016, rated a four-star recruit, Floyd committed to play college basketball at Long Beach State.

In June 2016, it was announced that Floyd would reclassify to the class of 2018 and transfer to Middlebrooks Academy in Los Angeles, California. After that season concluded, he received scholarship offers from NCAA Division I programs New Orleans and Cal State Bakersfield before committing to join NCAA Division I program Long Beach State. However, he lost his NCAA Division I scholarship offers when his grades plummeted following the death of his sister.

== College career ==
In his freshman season of college, Floyd played at Antelope Valley College in Lancaster, California, competing in the California Community College Athletic Association (CCCAA). On December 2, 2017, in the first round of the Gregg Anderson Memorial Tournament, he posted 32 points against El Camino College, shooting 13-of-16 from the field. In the season, Floyd averaged 15.5 points, 7.6 rebounds, and 0.8 assists in 18.5 minutes per game.

== Professional career ==
In April 2018, Floyd was chosen at a tryout as one of the first seven players to play for the Los Angeles Ballers of the Junior Basketball Association (JBA). In his professional debut alongside the league, Floyd recorded 34 points and a game-high 17 rebounds in a 134–124 win over the New York Ballers. Three days later, he recorded 31 points and a league record high 33 rebounds in a 150–145 win over the Seattle Ballers. On July 11, 2018, Floyd had 32 points and 19 rebounds in a high-scoring, 171–140 game against the Philadelphia Ballers. He was later named to the West roster for the JBA All-Star Game. He recorded 8 points and 8 rebounds to help top-seeded Los Angeles defeat the Seattle Ballers in the championship game.

After the JBA season, Floyd was named to the JBA USA Team, which would play 28 exhibition games against various European and Asian professional teams from September to December 2018. In his opening game versus Danish team Svendborg Rabbits, he collected 7 points and 7 rebounds and scored the game-winning basket with 0.3 second left in regulation. After three games as part of the overseas tour, he was released from the JBA on October 3, 2018, along with teammates Cameron Clark and JaMicheal Morgan.

== Personal life ==
Floyd has stated that he draws inspiration on the basketball court from his sister Monique Gittens, who died on December 8, 2014, at age 24. He said, "I don't really let it bring me down during the game; I use it as motivation, to do it for her. Play for her and play for my family."
