= Charles O'Bannon =

American basketball player (born 1975)

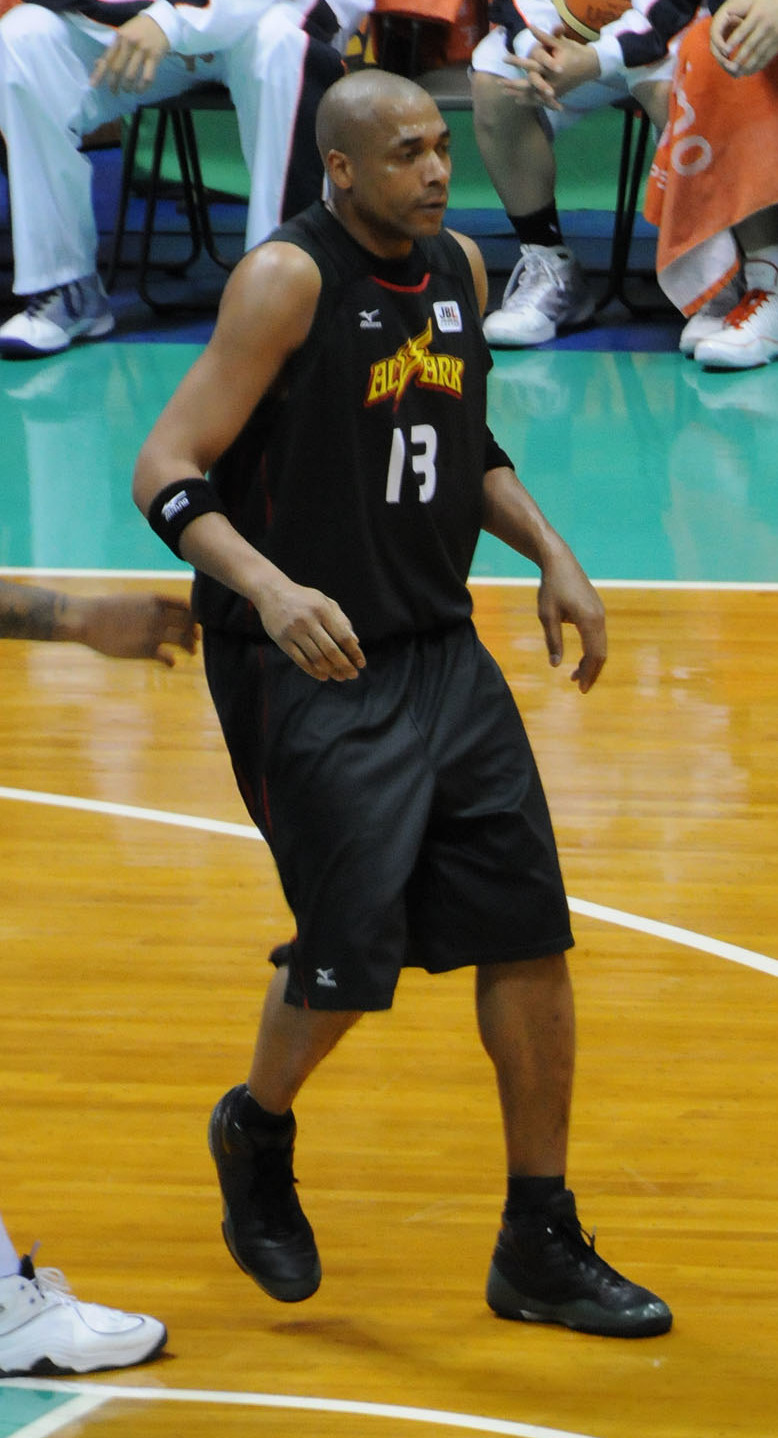
- O'Bannon with Toyota Alvark in 2009

Personal information
- Born: February 22, 1975 (age 51) Bellflower, California, U.S.
- Listed height: 6 ft 6 in (1.98 m)
- Listed weight: 200 lb (91 kg)

Career information
- High school: Artesia (Lakewood, California)
- College: UCLA (1993–1997)
- NBA draft: 1997: 2nd round, 31st overall pick
- Drafted by: Detroit Pistons
- Playing career: 1997–2013
- Position: Shooting guard / small forward
- Number: 5
- Coaching career: 2018–present

Career history

Playing
- 1997–1999: Detroit Pistons
- 1999–2000: Śląsk Wrocław
- 2000–2002: Toyota Alvark
- 2003: Benetton Treviso
- 2003–2010: Toyota Alvark
- 2010–2011: Toshiba Brave Thunders Kanagawa
- 2011–2013: Panasonic Trians

Coaching
- 2018: Seattle Ballers

Career highlights
- JBL Super League champion (2006, 2007); Polish Basketball League champion (2000); Polish League Finals MVP (2000); NCAA champion (1995); 2× First-team All-Pac-10 (1996, 1997); McDonald's All-American (1993); First-team Parade All-American (1993); Fourth-team Parade All-American (1992); California Mr. Basketball (1993)
- Stats at NBA.com
- Stats at Basketball Reference
Medals
Men's basketball
Representing United States
Summer Universiade
Gold medal – first place	1995 Fukuoka	Team competition

Charles Edward O'Bannon Sr. (born February 22, 1975) is an American former professional basketball player. He played college basketball with the UCLA Bruins. He was a two-time first-team all-conference player in the Pac-10 (now known as the Pac-12) and teamed with brother Ed to help the Bruins win a national championship in 1995. O'Bannon played two seasons in the National Basketball Association (NBA) with the Detroit Pistons and also played overseas in Japan, Poland, and Italy.

== College career ==
He played college basketball for the University of California, Los Angeles (UCLA) Bruins men's basketball team, where he was a star small forward/shooting guard. He was a starter in 1994–95 on the school's 1995 NCAA championship team. O'Bannon was a first team All-Pac-10 selection in 1996 and 1997, and he was also voted co-Most Valuable Player of the Bruins in both of those years. He is the younger brother of former NBA forward Ed O'Bannon, who played with him at UCLA.

As a member of Team USA, Charles O'Bannon won gold at the 1995 World University Games.

== Professional career ==
Charles O'Bannon was selected by the Detroit Pistons with the third pick in the second round of the 1997 NBA draft. He played for the Pistons for two seasons before being released. He scored his NBA career high of 14 points on April 14, 1999 against the Charlotte Hornets.

O'Bannon continued his professional basketball career by playing in various leagues outside of the United States in Italy, Poland, and Japan. He ended his career in 2013. In 2000, he won the Polish championship with Śląsk Wrocław and was named Finals' MVP. In April 2004, he joined Italian powerhouse Benetton Treviso where he became a team mate of fellow UCLA alumnus Tyus Edney. Playing for coach John Patrick, O'Bannon captured the championship title in Japan's JBL Super League in 2006 and made the 2006–07 JBL first team. In 2007, he repeated as JBL Super League champion with Alvark, this time coached by German Torsten Loibl. O'Bannon received Asia-basket.com 2006–07 All-JBL Super League Player of the Year honors.

== Coaching career ==
In 2018, O'Bannon was announced as head coach of the Seattle Ballers in the Junior Basketball Association (JBA). O'Bannon was named an assistant coach under the JBA USA Team (coached by Los Angeles Ballers' head coach Doyle Balthazer) for their 2018 international tour. He served as an assistant coach at Bishop Gorman High School in Las Vegas.

== Private life ==
His half-brother Turhon O'Bannon was a professional football player in the Canadian Football League.

O'Bannon is the father of Chuck O'Bannon Jr.

He is the younger brother of Ed O'Bannon.
