= Curtis Hollis =

American basketball player (born 1998)

No. 0 – VEF Rīga
- Position: Shooting guard / small forward
- League: LBL; LEBL

Personal information
- Born: April 25, 1998 (age 28) Arlington, Texas, U.S.
- Listed height: 6 ft 6 in (1.98 m)
- Listed weight: 186 lb (84 kg)

Career information
- High school: Mansfield Summit (Arlington, Texas); Advanced Prep International (Dallas, Texas)
- College: Hutchinson CC (2017–2018)
- NBA draft: 2020: undrafted
- Playing career: 2018–present

Career history
- 2018: Houston Ballers
- 2019–2020: Dragons Rhöndorf
- 2021: Santa Cruz Warriors
- 2022: Club Centro
- 2023: Sudbury Five
- 2023: Cape Town Tigers
- 2023: JBC
- 2023–2024: KW Titans
- 2024: Bangui
- 2024: Montreal Alliance
- 2024: Helsinki Seagulls
- 2024–2025: Vancouver Bandits
- 2025: Niagara River Lions
- 2025–2026: Valmiera Glass Via
- 2026: VEF Rīga
- 2026: 2026 BC Avtodor

Career highlights
- JBA All-Star (2018); Korisliiga Champion (2025)

Curtis Melvin Hollis (born April 25, 1998) is an American professional basketball player for VEF Rīga of the Latvian League (LBL) and the Latvian–Estonian League. He played one season for Hutchinson Community College. In 2018, he played for the Houston Ballers of the Junior Basketball Association (JBA).

== High school career ==
Hollis attended Mansfield Summit High School for three seasons and was named All-District as a junior. In his senior season, he transferred to Advanced Prep International and won the state championship. At API, Hollis played alongside Terrance Ferguson and Billy Preston, but was still invited to the Pangos All-American Camp in 2016. Hollis played on a team with Trae Young at the U16 level in his first year on Nike's EYBL circuit. He also played with future #1 pick Deandre Ayton around that time as well. Hollis scored 27 points in the semifinal of the 2016 Neosho Holiday Classic. He competed in AAU play for NIKE Proskills, Houston Hoops, and YGC36.

In his senior year, Hollis made the school football team and played seven games at wide receiver. He had 12 receptions for 222 yards and was listed as a three-star prospect by 247sports.com. Hollis was also named MVP at the Dallas Cowboys U Camp, and was spoken of highly by Jason Garrett, the Cowboys' head coach. He drew football scholarship offers from Kansas and Oklahoma State. Ultimately, Hollis committed to North Texas, but never played for them in order to focus on basketball.

== College career ==
After high school, Hollis attended Hutchinson Community College in Hutchinson, Kansas. The college was one of the better National Junior College Athletic Association (NJCAA) programs and produced NBA player Kadeem Allen. As a freshman, Hollis averaged 6.9 points, 3.3 rebounds and 1.4 assists per game, shooting 50 percent from the field. His best game was a 19-point performance against Garden City Community College on February 7, 2018. Hutchinson's season ended when they fell to Florida SouthWestern in the NJCAA tournament, ending their quest for back-to-back titles. After one season, Hollis decided to go professional.

== Professional career ==
=== Houston Ballers ===
In April 2018, Hollis joined the Houston Ballers of the Junior Basketball Association (JBA). He was persuaded to join the nascent league after talking to founder LaVar Ball and being informed that the top 10 players would compete against European talent. “It’s been amazing, honestly. The competition out here is crazy. A lot of people are out here trying to chase their dream," said Hollis. Hollis stated that the idea of the JBA resonated with him, and he was named the best player on the team by the Chicago Sun-Times. In his debut on June 23, 2018, Hollis was close to recording a triple-double with 24 points, 13 rebounds, and a team-high 8 assists in a blowout 116–91 win over the New York Ballers. Three days later, he recorded a new season-high 31 points and 13 rebounds in a 125–117 overtime loss over the Chicago Ballers. In the third game against Dallas on June 28, Hollis led all scorers with 34 points to go with 7 rebounds and 6 assists to ensure a close 105–102 victory. During his next game, on July 3, Hollis was on the precipice of his first triple-double yet again, recording 29 points, a new season-high 16 rebounds, and a career-high 9 assists in a 115–109 loss to the Atlanta Ballers. On July 17, Hollis recorded a career-high 37 points and 16 rebounds in a 111–103 win over the Philadelphia Ballers. On July 26, Hollis topped his previous scoring high with 40 points, 11 rebounds, and 9 assists in a 169–153 loss to the Los Angeles Ballers. He was later named to the West roster for the JBA All-Star Game. Hollis averaged 29.3 points, 11.3 rebounds, and 5.3 assists per game for Houston. After the conclusion of the inaugural JBA season, Hollis was named one of 14 players included for the JBA USA Team for their 2018 international tour.

=== Dragons Rhöndorf ===
In July 2019, Hollis signed with the Dragons Rhöndorf of the German ProB league. Head coach of the Dragons Yassin Idhibi became aware of Hollis through the JBA European tour. He had 26 points and 11 rebounds in a win against the New Elephants Grevenbroich. Hollis scored 28 points in an upset of the Rheinstars Cologne. Hollis posted 40 points against Baunach Young Pikes, and scored 20 or more points in 13 games. He averaged 22.7 points, 8.2 rebounds, 3.6 assists and 3.0 steals per game in 18 games. Hollis left the team in January 2020.

=== Santa Cruz Warriors ===
In October 2021, Hollis joined the Santa Cruz Warriors of the NBA G League after a successful tryout. However, he was waived on November 4.

=== Club Centro ===
In October 2022, Hollis played in the Dominican Republic for Club Centro. He made his debut on December 14, and had 45 points, 5 rebounds and 8 assists on 71% shooting from the field, against Antonio Guzman.

=== Sudbury Five ===
Hollis played with the Sudbury Five of the NBL Canada in the 2023 season. He scored 18.4 points per game in fourteen games with Sudbury.

=== Cape Town Tigers and JBC ===
On April 13, 2023, Hollins was announced as a new signing for the Cape Town Tigers of South Africa and the Basketball Africa League (BAL). In November 2023, Hollis joined the roster of Zimbabwean club JBC for their participation in the Elite 16 of the Road to BAL.

=== Bangui Sporting Club ===
In April 2024, Hollis was revealed to be on the roster of Bangui Sporting Club for the 2024 BAL season. He made his debut on 19 April coming off the bench for Bangui.

=== Helsinki Seagulls ===
On October 4, 2024, Hollis signed with the Helsinki Seagulls of the Korisliiga.

=== Vancouver Bandits ===
On May 4, 2025, Hollis signed with the Vancouver Bandits of the Canadian Elite Basketball League.
