= Eagle's Nest Arena =

Sporting arena

Coordinates: 34°3′59″N 118°10′2″W

- Interactive map of Eagle's Nest Arena
- Full name: The Eagle's Nest Arena
- Former names: Diablo Den
- Address: Los Angeles, California; U.S.
- Capacity: 3,200
- Type: Indoor arena

The Eagle's Nest Arena, formerly known as the Diablo Den, is an indoor arena situated on the California State University, Los Angeles (Cal State L.A.) campus.

This venue serves as the home court for the Golden Eagles' basketball and volleyball teams. Measuring 94 feet (29 meters) in length and 80 feet (24 meters) in width, the arena is capable of accommodating two basketball courts and up to three volleyball courts simultaneously.

With a seating capacity of 3,200, the arena has a rich history, having hosted the judo competitions during the 1984 Summer Olympics. It also played a pivotal role in the sports landscape by serving as the venue for the inaugural JBA playoffs, hosting rounds leading up to the championship in 2018.
