= Deon Lyle =

American basketball player (born 1996)

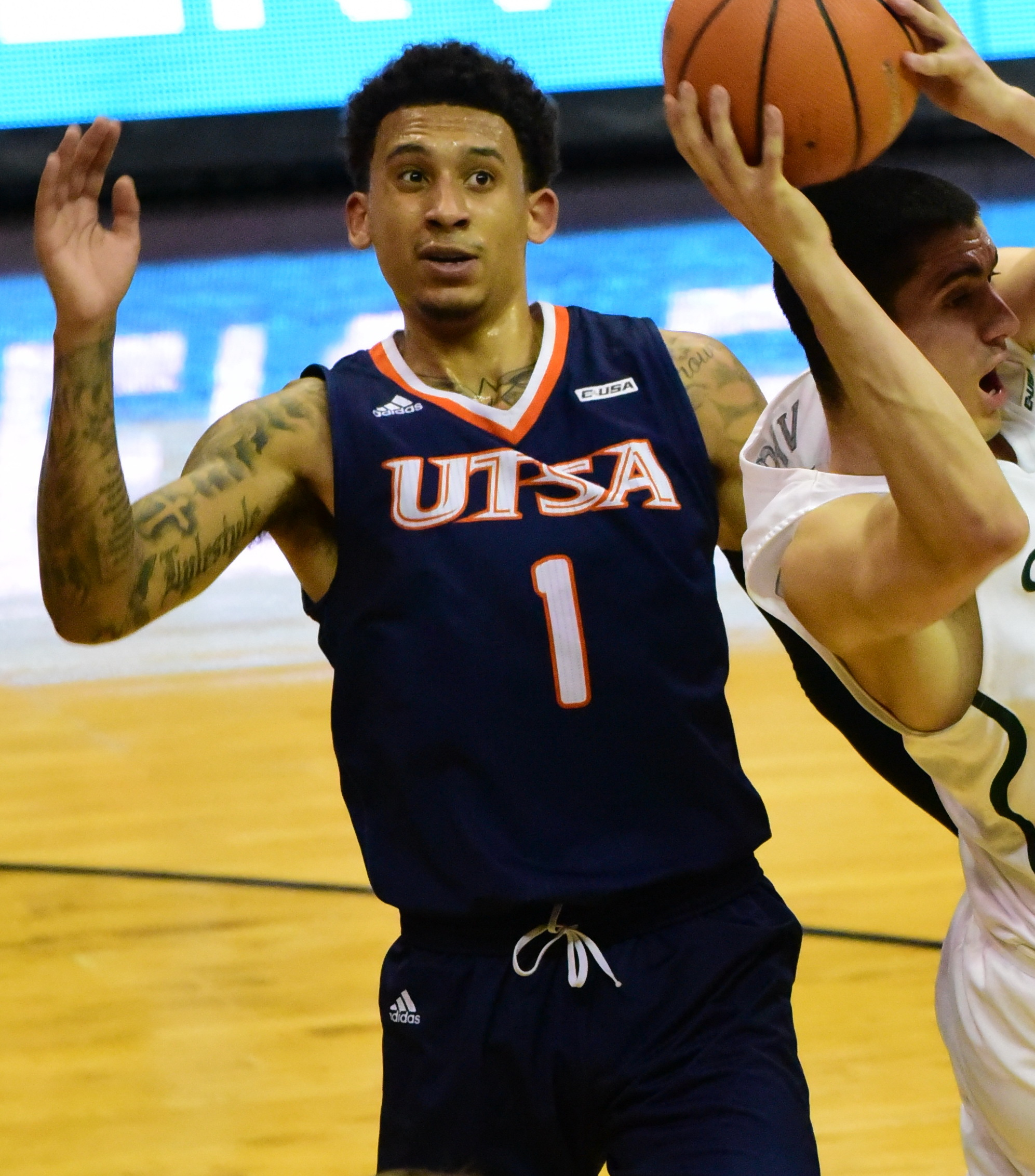
- Lyle with UTSA in 2018

No. 3 – Al Qadsiah
- Position: Shooting guard
- League: Saudi Basketball League

Personal information
- Born: August 30, 1996 (age 30) Norton, Kansas, U.S.
- Listed height: 6 ft 6 in (1.98 m)
- Listed weight: 190 lb (86 kg)

Career information
- High school: Hastings (Hastings, Nebraska); Norton Community High School (Norton, Kansas)
- College: Cloud CC (2015–2017); UTSA (2017–2018)
- NBA draft: 2019: undrafted
- Playing career: 2018–present

Career history
- 2018: Chicago Ballers
- 2019–2020: Aragats
- 2020: Albany Patroons
- 2020: Tijuana Zonkeys
- 2021: Enid Outlaws
- 2021: FAP Yaoundé
- 2022: Potawatomi Fire
- 2023: Albany Patroons
- 2024: Frederick Flying Cows
- 2025: San Antonio Clutch
- 2026: Great Falls Electric
- 2026–present: Al Qadsiah

Career highlights
- JBA All-Star (2018); JBA All-Star Game Co-MVP (2018); Conference USA Sixth Man of the Year (2018)

Deon Jay Lyle (born August 30, 1996) is an American professional basketball player for Al Qadsiah of the Saudi Basketball League. He played college basketball for the Cloud CC Thunderbirds and the UTSA Roadrunners. In 2018, he played for the Chicago Ballers of the Junior Basketball Association (JBA).

== High school career ==
The son of Arthur and Sarah Lyle, Deon has three brothers and one sister. He grew up in Hastings, Nebraska and learned to play basketball at the YMCA. Lyle played two seasons at Hastings High School in Nebraska. In his junior year, he transferred to Norton Community High School in Kansas. As a senior, he averaged 21.9 points, 8.8 boards, 2.7 assists and 2.5 steals per game. Lyle was named first-team All-Mid-Continent League and honorable mention Kansas 3A All-State.

== College career ==
In his freshman season of college, Lyle played at Cloud County Community College under coach Chad Eshbaugh. He averaged 4.3 points and 0.9 rebounds per game as a freshman. Lyle's best game that season was a 25 point performance in a win over Pratt Community College on February 25, 2016. As a sophomore, he led the team in scoring with 15 points per game while also tallying 3.8 rebounds and 1.5 assists per contest. He shot 41.4 percent from the field and 39.6 percent from behind the 3-point line in helping the T-Birds to a 20-11 record. Lyle was named to the first team All-Kansas Jayhawk Community College Conference and second-team National Junior College Athletic Association All-Region VI. His best game as a sophomore came on November 19, 2016, when he scored 31 points in a win against Seward County Community College.

After his sophomore season, Lyle transferred to UTSA where he played under coach Steve Henson. He had 21 points in a 93-83 loss to Southern Miss on January 6, 2018. On March 3, Lyle hit eight three-pointers and scored a career-high 33 points in a 79-60 win against Rice. He scored 16 points in the first round of the 2018 CIT versus Lamar after shooting poorly in the Conference USA Tournament. In his only year on the team, Lyle finished third on the team in scoring with 11.3 points per game. Lyle's 96 three-pointers tied the school single-season record. He was named Conference USA Sixth Man of the Year.

== Professional career ==
After his season at UTSA, Lyle requested a release from the school and initially planned to transfer to Nicholls State. However, he later announced he was turning professional. In June 2018 it was announced that Lyle would join the Chicago Ballers of the Junior Basketball Association (JBA). In the inaugural JBA game on June 21, Lyle recorded a double-double of 24 points and 10 rebounds in a 128–117 loss to the Atlanta Ballers. Five days later, he recorded season-highs of 28 points, 13 rebounds, and 5 assists in a 125–117 win over the Houston Ballers. Lyle averaged 22.7 points, 10.1 rebounds and 3.7 assists per game in his first season. He was named to the East roster for the JBA All-Star Game. Lyle recorded a near triple-double during the event, scoring a game-high 51 points, grabbing a team-high 11 rebounds, and putting up 9 assists in a 202–189 loss to win East Most Valuable Player (MVP). After the conclusion of the inaugural JBA season, Lyle was named one of 14 players included for the JBA USA Team for their 2018 international tour.

Lyle declared for the 2019 NBA draft, but was undrafted. On October 9, 2019, Lyle joined defending champion Aragats of the Armenia Basketball League A. In February 2020, Lyle signed with the Albany Patroons of The Basketball League. Lyle joined the Tijuana Zonkeys of the Circuito de Baloncesto de la Costa del Pacífico (CIBACOPA) in March. In his Mexican debut, Lyle finished with 18 points, 8 rebounds, and 2 assists in a win over Mantarrayas de La Paz.

In 2021, Lyle signed with the Enid Outlaws of The Basketball League.

In December 2021, Lyle joined FAP in Cameroon to play for the team in the final round of the 2022 BAL qualification.

== Career statistics ==
Legend
GP	Games played	GS	Games started	MPG	Minutes per game
FG%	Field goal percentage	3P%	3-point field goal percentage	FT%	Free throw percentage
RPG	Rebounds per game	APG	Assists per game	SPG	Steals per game
BPG	Blocks per game	PPG	Points per game	**Bold**	Career high

=== College ===
Year	Team	GP	GS	MPG	FG%	3P%	FT%	RPG	APG	SPG	BPG	PPG
2017–18	UTSA	35	6	19.6	.416	.403	.628	3.7	.3	.3	.1	11.3
