= JaMicheal Morgan =

American basketball player

Free agent
- Position: Shooting guard

Personal information
- Born: December 28, 1998 (age 27)
- Listed height: 6 ft 5 in (1.96 m)
- Listed weight: 183 lb (83 kg)

Career information
- High school: Blue Valley Northwest (Overland Park, Kansas); Link Year Prep (Branson, Missouri)
- NBA draft: 2019: undrafted
- Playing career: 2018–2020, 2024–present

Career history
- 2018: Seattle Ballers
- 2019–2020: Peja
- 2024–2025: OKK Novi Pazar

JaMicheal Morgan (born December 22, 1998) is an American professional basketball player who last played for OKK Novi Pazar of the Basketball League of Serbia. He competed for Blue Valley Northwest High School and Link Year Prep. In 2018, he joined the Seattle Ballers of the Junior Basketball Association

== High school career ==
Morgan attended Blue Valley Northwest High School in Overland Park, Kansas, where he competed on the football, basketball, and track and field teams. He finished 7th in Kansas in the triple jump. Morgan was named honorable mention All-6A as a junior on the basketball team. He was also named to the All-810 Varsity Third Team after averaging 10 points per game. He teamed with Tulsa commit Darien Jackson to lead Blue Valley Northwest to the state semifinals, where they lost to Shawnee Mission North High School. As a senior, Morgan was named to the First Team All-Class 6A. He was a McDonald's All American nominee. He represented Kansas in the Greater Kansas City Basketball Coaches Association Missouri vs. Kansas All-Star Game on April 7, 2017.

A three-star recruit according to Rivals.com, Morgan signed with Oral Roberts in November 2016. However, he decommitted from Oral Roberts after coach Scott Sutton was fired. He did a postgraduate year at Link Year Prep.

== Professional career ==
Instead of attending college, Morgan joined the Seattle Ballers of the Junior Basketball Association in 2018. “This is my dream, just to play basketball and not worry about nothing,” he said. He averaged 25.4 points, 7.7 rebounds, 4.7 assists, 3.3 steals, and one block per game for Seattle. Morgan scored 13 points in the championship game loss to the Los Angeles Ballers. In September 2018, Morgan was named to the JBA's USA Select team as one of the top 13 players in the league.

Morgan declared for the 2019 NBA draft, but was undrafted. On September 12, 2019, Morgan signed with KB Peja of Kosovo's top division.

On December 9, 2024, Morgan signed with OKK Novi Pazar of the Basketball League of Serbia.

== Personal life ==
Morgan is the son of Dinsdale Morgan and Jeanetta Lyle-Morgan, who met at Pittsburg State University. His father was an Olympian in the 400-meter hurdles. Morgan has two siblings: Dinsdale and Jakaila. Dinsdale Jr. competes in track and field at the University of Kansas.
