= Antelope Valley College =

Community college in Lancaster, California, US

Antelope Valley College (AVC)
- Motto: Enriching Lives, Building Futures
- Type: Public community college
- Established: 1929
- Parent institution: Antelope Valley College District, California Community College system
- President: Dr. Jennifer Zellet
- Students: 14,024 (spring 2013)
- Location: Lancaster, California, United States
- Campus: 135 acres (55 ha)
- Colors: Maroon, Poppy, and Blue
- Nickname: Marauders
- Sporting affiliations: CCCAA – WSC, SCFA (football)
- Website: www.avc.edu
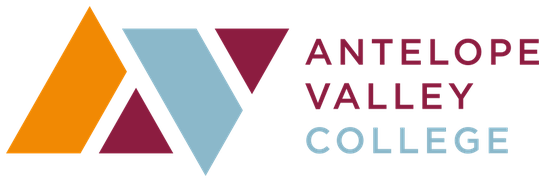

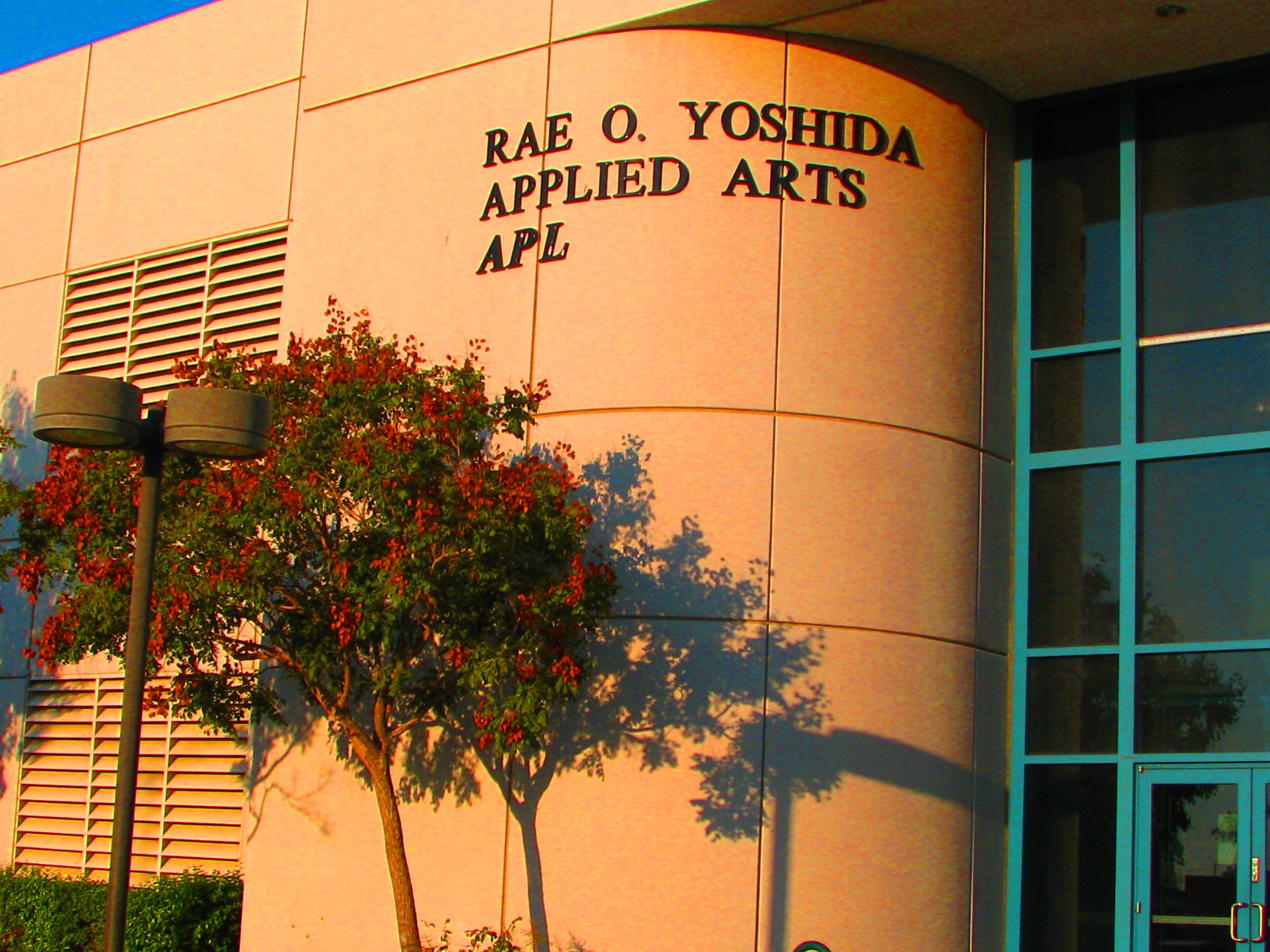
Yoshida Applied Arts Building

Antelope Valley College (AVC) is a public community college in Lancaster, California. It is part of the California Community College system. It is operated by the Antelope Valley Community College District, with a primary service area of 1,945 square miles (5,040 km^{2}) covering portions of Los Angeles and Kern counties. Instruction is offered at several sites, including Palmdale and Lancaster, and through online and instructional television courses.

The college offers Associate in Arts and Associate in Science degrees in 71 fields as well as certificate programs in 59 vocational areas.

The main campus in Lancaster hosts the satellite location of California State University, Bakersfield-Antelope Valley (CSUB-AV), where students can obtain bachelor's and master's degrees in select subjects.

== History ==
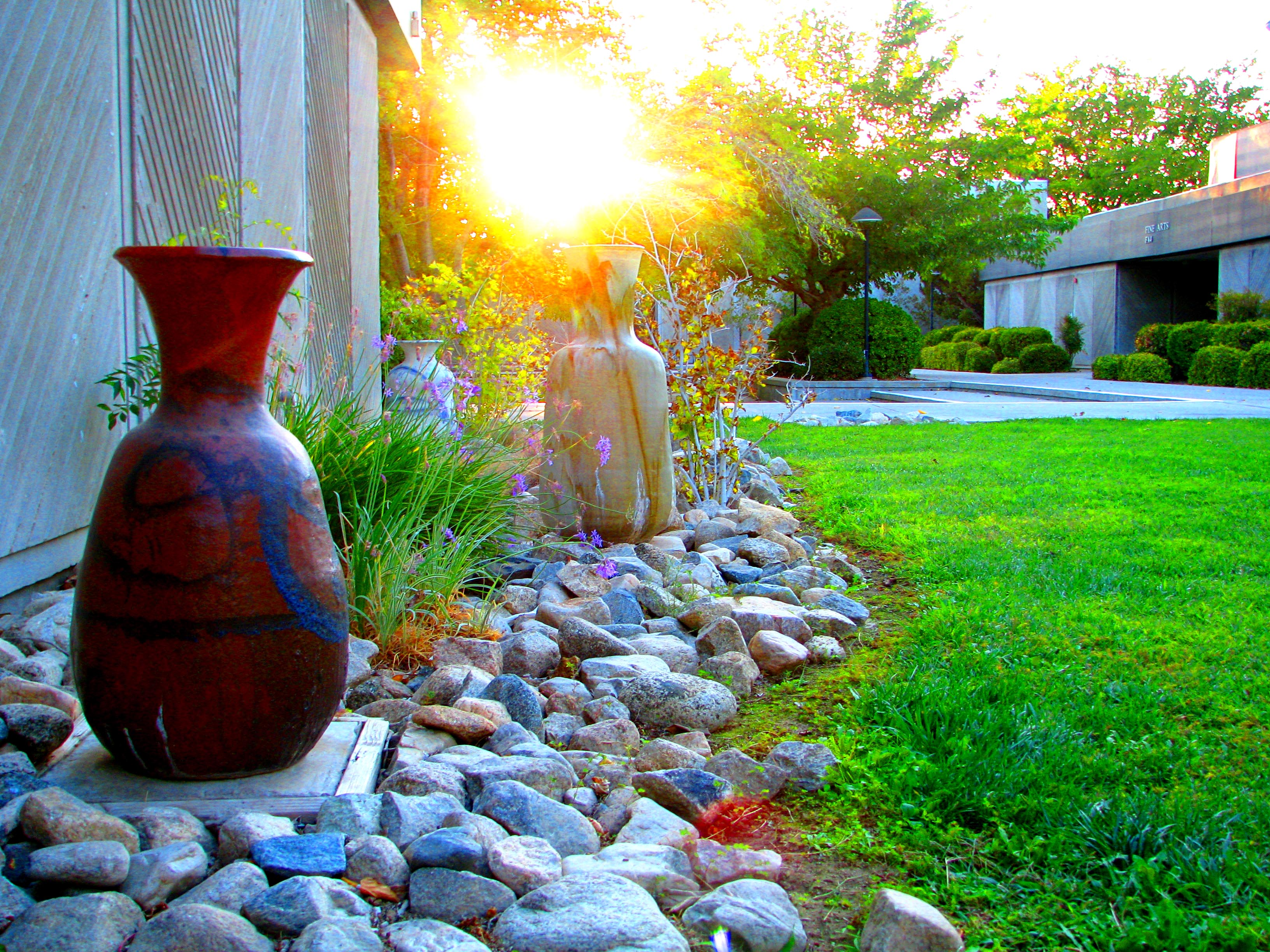
Garden on AVC Campus

Average daily attendance (ADA) at the college reached 100 by 1939, but with World War II, attendance plummeted. Attendance reached a low of 13 during the war, the same ADA as the year the school was founded.

There were pressures to close the junior college, but trustees and staff held out until veterans returned from the war. Enrollment grew steadily during the postwar years, partly because of the GI Bill of Rights and partly because Antelope Valley began developing an aircraft industry.

In 1959, groundbreaking was held for a new college campus on 110 acres (45 ha) at Avenue K and 30th Street West, designed by the architect Henry L. Gogerty (1894–1990).

The college campus has expanded to approximately 135 acres (55 ha) through land purchases.

== Academics ==
Student demographics as of Fall 2023
Race and ethnicity	Total
Hispanic	64%
African American	14%
White	13%
Multiracial	4%
Asian	2%
Filipino	2%
Unknown	1%

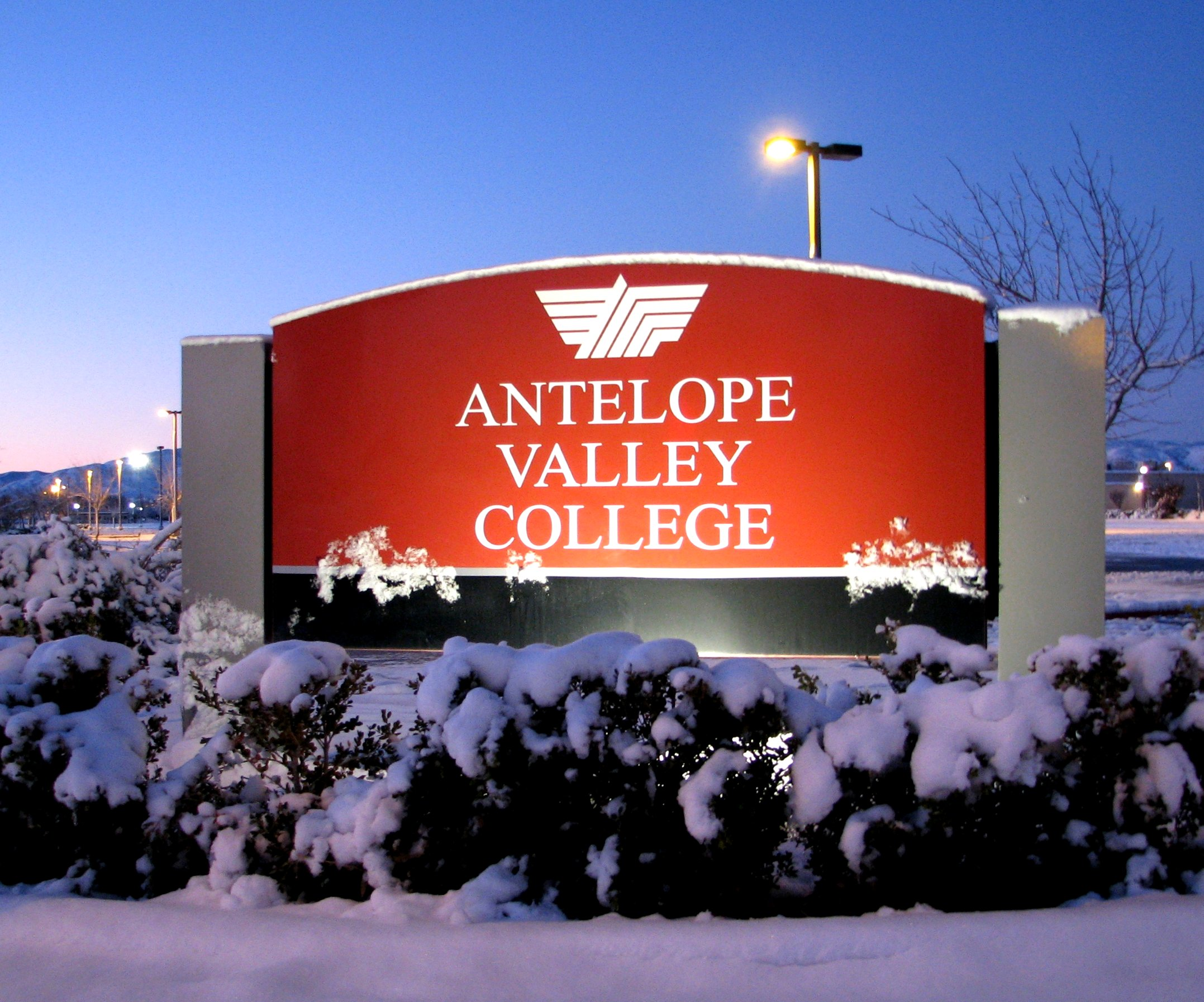

Antelope Valley College has grown to a student population of approximately 16,000. It is accredited by the Accrediting Commission for Community and Junior Colleges.

Among the many programs offered through the college are an associate degree program in registered nursing approved by the Board of Registered Nursing, an airframe and powerplant technician program certified by the Federal Aviation Administration, and a lower division engineering program that co-ordinates with an engineering degree program offered locally through California State University, Long Beach. Other programs include aircraft fabrication and assembly (including composite materials), computer graphics, respiratory therapy, Firefighter I Academy and wildland fire technology.

In conjunction with the Los Angeles County Sheriff's Department, the Lancaster campus hosts the Sheriff's Training Academy, which meets the requirements of the Peace Officer Standards and Training for training members of the sheriff's department and other law enforcement agencies.

The community college district is governed by a locally elected Board of Trustees consisting of five members serving four-year terms, plus a student trustee elected annually by members of the student body.

=== Palmdale campus ===
The college maintains a temporary leased site in the City of Palmdale, which serves nearly 2,000 students. Plans call for creation of a full campus on 60 acres (24 ha) of land in southern Palmdale on 25th Street East, south of Avenue S. College officials are working toward a sustainable enrollment of 1,000 full-time equivalent students to qualify Palmdale for center status—a key step in developing a permanent campus. Officials in April 2009 expressed their intent to submit an initial project proposal for a campus to the state in June 2010.

== Athletics ==
The college's athletic teams are known as the Marauders. The college currently fields eight men's and eight women's varsity teams. It competes as a member of the California Community College Athletic Association (CCCAA) in the Western State Conference (WSC) for all sports except football, which competes in Southern California Football Association (SCFA).

== Notable alumni ==
- Kevin Appier, former MLB pitcher
- Jim Bruske, former MLB pitcher
- Brodus Clay, former WWE wrestler
- DeAndra Cobb, former running back
- Dave Cox, California State Senator, 1st District
- Kevin Curtis, founder and chief technology officer, InPhase Technologies
- Dewayne Dedmon, professional basketball player
- Greg Floyd Jr., professional basketball player
- Steve Knight, U.S. Congressman, California 25th District
- Tony Reed, former running back
- James Richards, former Canadian Football League offensive guard
- Isaiah Rider, former professional basketball player
- Kay Ryan, Poet Laureate, Library of Congress, July 2008 – 2010
- Jim Slaton, former Milwaukee Brewers pitcher
- Hunter Sharp, former professional football player
