= Desert Pines High School =

Location
- 3800 Harris Avenue; Las Vegas, Nevada 89110; United States; 36.17867°N 115.0924°W

Information
- School type: Public School & Magnet School For Communications & Information Technology & Culinary Arts
- Motto: Making An Impact
- Established: 1999
- School district: Clark County School District
- Principal: Shirley Jimenez
- Teaching staff: 153.00 (FTE)
- Grades: 9–12
- Enrollment: 3,011 (2024–2025)
- Student to teacher ratio: 19.68
- Colours: Blue, black, white, and silver
- Athletics conference: Sunrise 1A Region
- Team name: Jaguars
- Publication: The Prowler
- Website: www.desertpineshs.org

Desert Pines High School is a public high school in Las Vegas, Nevada, United States, and is a part of the Clark County School District. The school which opened in 1999, also houses the Academy of Information Technology and the Academy of Communications.

== Academy of Information Technology ==
The Academy of Information Technology at Desert Pines is a magnet program that educates students on the products, service, and implementation of information technology. Students enrolled in the academy learn about hardware (CyberCore, tech support, and computer forensics), software (programming, web development, and ORACLE), as well as networks (Cisco, Novell, etc.). After graduating from the program, students receive industry recognized certifications in A+, Cisco, Java, and ORACLE.

== Extracurricular activities ==
=== JROTC ===
Desert Pines is home to one of the two Junior Reserve Officers' Training Corps units in the Clark County School District (the other being at Basic High School).

=== Athletics ===
The athletic programs at Desert Pines are known as the Jaguars and participate in the Northeast Division in the Sunrise 4A Region. The Jaguars football team have made the playoffs and as always show strong players, but did not have much success until the 2016 season. On Saturday, November 19, 2016, the Desert Pines varsity football team beat Spring Creek High School in the 3A high school football state championship game with a score of 39-6.

== Notable alumni ==
- Pierre Jackson (2009), NBA player
- Jeremiah Poutasi (2012), former NFL offensive lineman
- Julian Jacobs (2013), basketball player
- Nate Grimes (2015 - transferred), basketball player
- Tony Fields II (2017), NFL linebacker
- Greg Floyd Jr. (2017 - transferred), basketball player
- Tate Martell (2017), former college football quarterback
- Jordan Howden (2018), NFL safety
- Darnell Washington (2020), NFL tight-end
- Jovantae Barnes (2022), college football running back
- Milos Uzan (2022), NBA player
