= Kezo Brown =

American basketball player (born 1999)

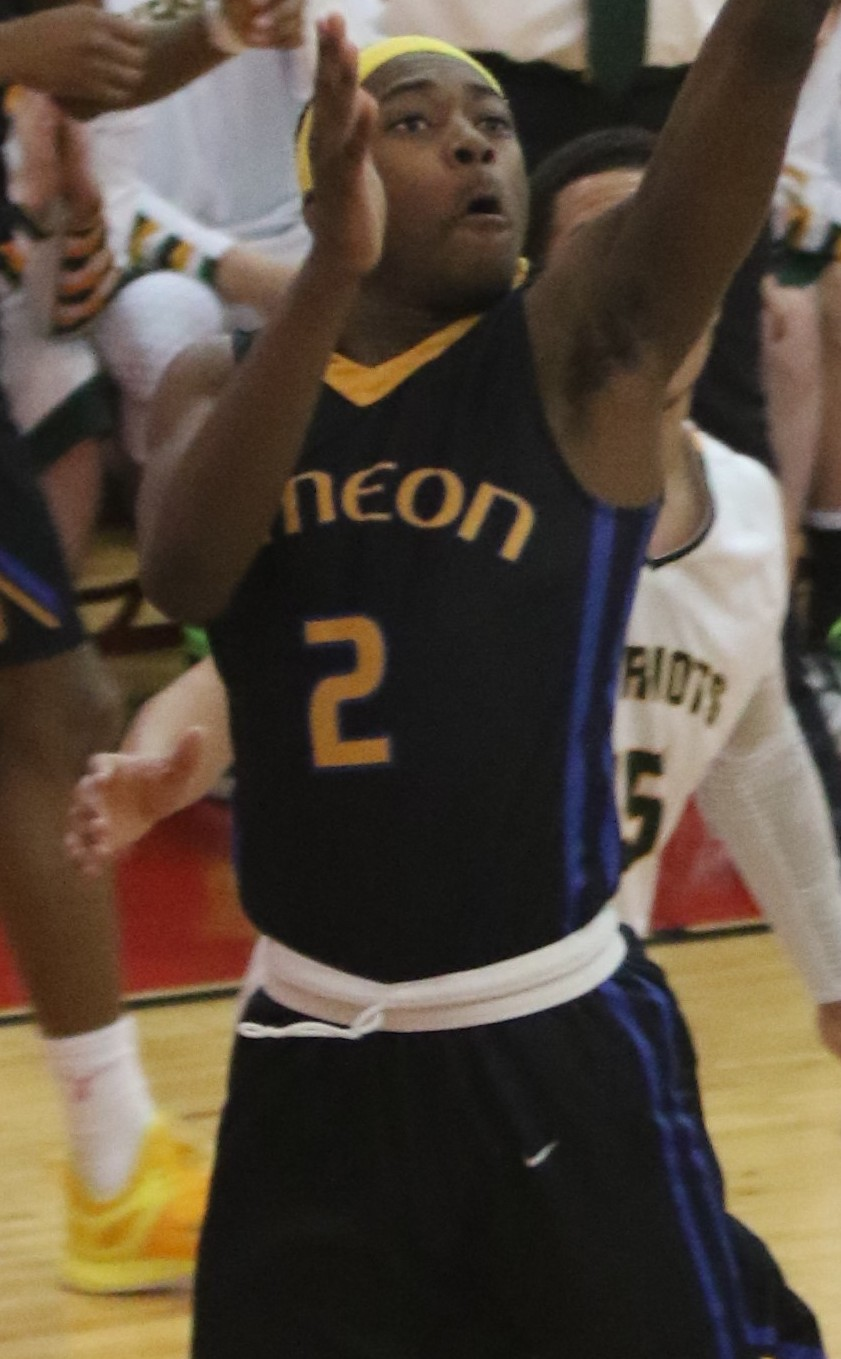
- Brown (left) attempts a layup in 2015

Personal information
- Born: December 27, 1999 (age 26) Chicago, Illinois, U.S.
- Listed height: 6 ft 2 in (1.88 m)
- Listed weight: 178 lb (81 kg)

Career information
- High school: Simeon (Chicago, Illinois)
- Playing career: 2018–present
- Position: Point guard

Career history
- 2018: Chicago Ballers
- 2019–2021: Chicago Angels
- 2022: Chicago Ballers
- 2022: Ensenada Lobos

Marquis Davale Brown Jr. (born December 27, 1999) is an American professional basketball player for the Chicago Angels of the American Basketball Association (ABA). He competed for Simeon Career Academy in his hometown of Chicago, where he was a three-star recruit and one of the top high school players in Illinois from his freshman year. Despite being sidelined and hospitalized with mental health issues in multiple seasons at Simeon, he continued drawing interest from Chicago State, eventually committing to play for them at the NCAA Division I level. However, Brown later dropped his college plans, instead turning professional with the Chicago Ballers in the Junior Basketball Association. Brown was shot five times during an altercation in Chicago in March 2019.

== High school career ==
In the 2014–15 season, Brown became the first freshman to play for Simeon Career Academy under head coach Robert Smith other than Jabari Parker. Before the season, Simeon was ranked 13th in the nation by basketball website MaxPreps, and Smith praised Brown: "He's a true point guard and does the dirty work. He can score but is also great at getting guys open." As a freshman, Brown helped the team finish with a 27–3 record and earn a second-place finish at the Chicago Public League Tournament in 2015. He was considered one of the top freshman in the country, drawing attention from various colleges, mainly Nebraska and DePaul. He also received interest from top programs like Duke and Kentucky.

Despite his early success, Brown was sidelined for much of his sophomore season due to a mental health issue, which was undisclosed at the time, playing under 30 total minutes in the season and seeing dwindling interest from colleges. However, he began playing again in the following spring, starring on the Mac Irvin Fire Amateur Athletic Union (AAU) team. In his junior year, Brown assumed a leading role for Simeon, scoring 26 points in a city title game win over Morgan Park High School. In May 2017, he suffered an ankle injury that sidelined him for the remainder of the season. In the summer, he committed to play college basketball at Chicago State, being considered one of the program's best recruits ever.

In October 2017, it was announced that Brown was in a psychiatric hospital. As a result, he was sidelined for his entire senior season at Simeon. However, he was still expected to graduate high school.

== Professional career ==
In May 2018, Brown announced plans to join the Chicago Ballers of the Junior Basketball Association (JBA), a newly-formed alternative professional league to college basketball created by LaVar Ball. He was encouraged to make the decision after Tracy Dildy, who was fired by Chicago State after Brown committed, became head coach of the Ballers. However, Dildy was later replaced as head coach of the Chicago Ballers by former Chicago State assistant Eddie Denard. Brown signed a two-year, non-guaranteed contract in June. His father Marquis Brown, Sr. said, "It has been a big whirlwind. I think God has to put you through situations. Not everyone got this opportunity. We can name at least 10 players that would be happy to be in this situation." Brown recorded a career-high 46 points in a 125–117 overtime win over the Houston Ballers.

Brown reportedly left the JBA for an opportunity to play in France. However, this opportunity never materialized and Brown stayed in the United States looking for additional opportunities to continue his career.

On September 9, 2018, Brown reportedly signed with the Illinois Bulldogs of the American Basketball Association (ABA), a semi-professional league in the United States. Brown did not play in the ABA for the Bulldogs and in late 2019 joined a team in China's Wildball League.

In March 2019, Brown was shot five times outside a store in the South Side of Chicago. After the shooting, Brown's father started his own ABA team, the Chicago Angels. In his first game back after recovery, Brown posted a 31-point, 11-assist performance as the Angels defeated the Libertyville Vipers 149–110. He later played with the Angels when the team joined the Pro Basketball Association in 2021. Brown also played for the Chicago Ballers of the Premier Basketball League in 2022, reaching the championship game.

Brown signed with the Ensenada Lobos of the Mexican Circuito de Baloncesto del Pacífico (CIBAPAC) ahead of the 2022 CIBAPAC season.

== Personal life ==
Brown's favorite basketball player was Kobe Bryant, and his favorite team is the Los Angeles Lakers.
