= Los Angeles Ballers =

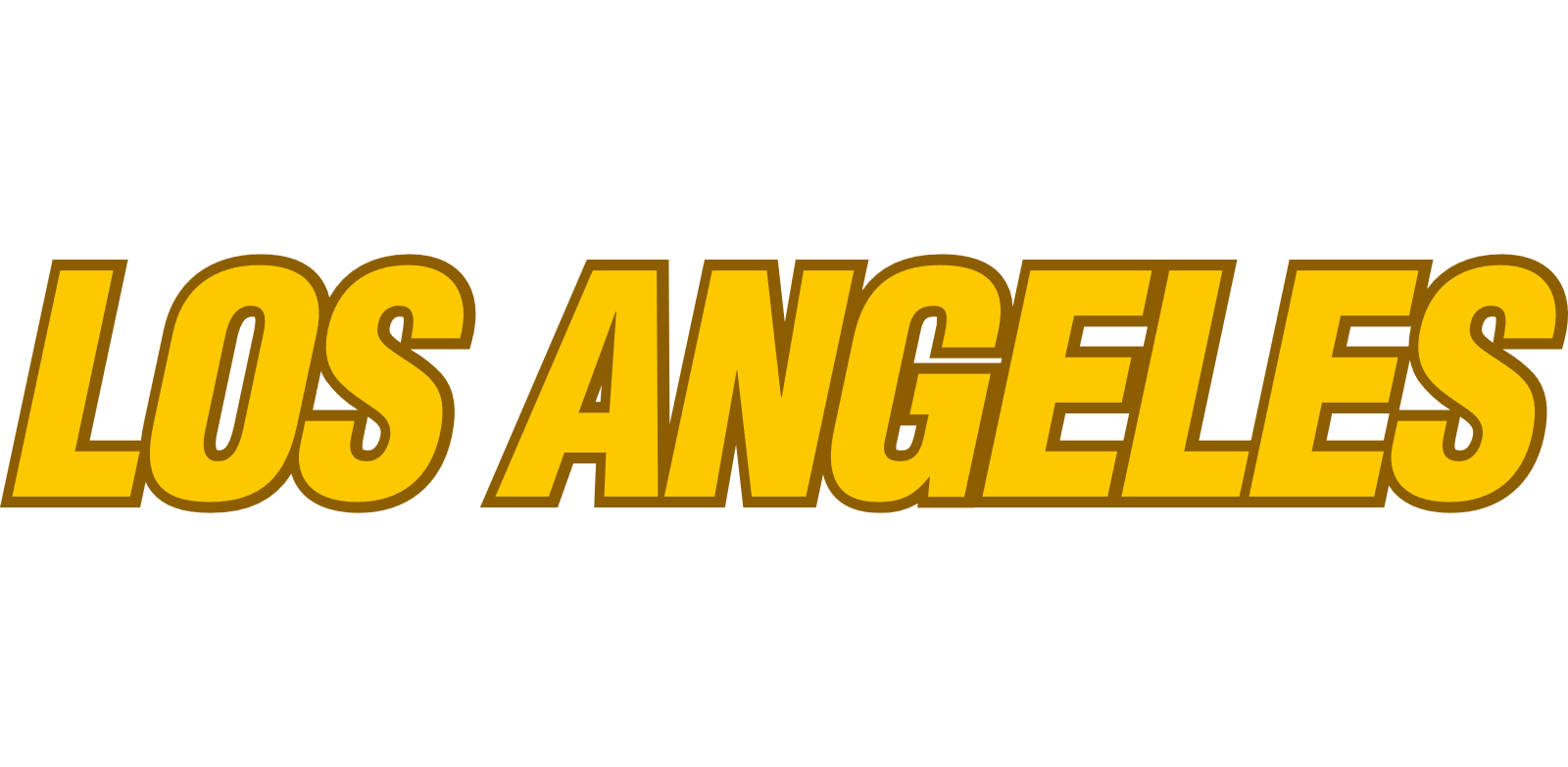
- League: JBA
- Founded: 2018
- Dissolved: 2018
- History: Los Angeles Ballers; 2018 JBA season
- Location: Los Angeles, California
- Team colours: Gold, goldenrod, black
- Head coach: Doyle Balthazar
- Championships: 1 (2018)
Home	Away

The Los Angeles Ballers were a professional basketball team based in Los Angeles, California. The team competed in the Junior Basketball Association (JBA), a league created for high school and junior college players as an alternative to the National Collegiate Athletic Association (NCAA). They won the championship for the league's only 2018 season.

== History ==
The JBA was first announced on December 20, 2017, when media personality LaVar Ball said to Slam magazine that he would create a professional league targeted at high school graduates and fully funded by his sports apparel company Big Baller Brand. The league held tryouts in Irvine, California in April 2018, attracting about 25 prospects, and having already handpicked a nearly completed roster of 7 members for the Los Angeles Ballers. One significant addition to the Ballers was Greg Floyd Jr., a four-star recruit out of Las Vegas who had spent a season at Antelope Valley College due to NCAA eligibility issues. In May, the team added LaMelo Ball, who did not graduate from high school, the youngest son of the league's founder LaVar and a former five-star recruit with limited professional experience, who the JBA labeled as its "marquee player" for the debut season. Their head coach, Doyle Balthazer, previously played alongside LaVar at West Los Angeles College. On July 9, 2018, LiAngelo Ball announced that he would play for the team, after going undrafted in the 2018 NBA draft. The Ballers won the remainder of their games and claimed the JBA title for the 2018 season.

On August 16, 2018, after the JBA season, former Los Angeles player Brandon Phillips alleged that the league only paid him one-third of what was promised. Phillips, who was cut in the middle of the season to make way for LiAngelo Ball, also claimed that he had to pay bag fees on flights during the season and that the JBA had stopped contacting him. However, Phillips later clarified that his grievances weren't aimed towards the league's founder, but rather his business partner and friend Alan Foster.

== 2018 Roster ==
Los Angeles Ballers roster
Players
Coaches

Pos.	No.	Nat.	Name	Ht.	Wt.	Age
G	0	(United States)	Malone, Niles	5 ft 10 in (1.78 m)	170 lb (77 kg)	27 – 15 July 1998
G	3	(United States)	Ball, LiAngelo	6 ft 6 in (1.98 m)	230 lb (100 kg)	27 – 24 November 1998
G/F	5	(United States)	Reed, Marquis	6 ft 5 in (1.96 m)	190 lb (86 kg)	28 – 5 May 1997
G/F	8	(United States)	Phillips, Brandon	6 ft 6 in (1.98 m)	195 lb (88 kg)	27 – 3 July 1998
G/F	8	(United States)	Mack, Keshaun	6 ft 4 in (1.93 m)	185 lb (84 kg)	29 – 17 August 1996
SF	13	(United States)	Floyd, Greg	6 ft 9 in (2.06 m)	200 lb (91 kg)	26 – 10 April 1999
F/C	24	(United States)	Davis, Melvin	6 ft 10 in (2.08 m)	245 lb (111 kg)	27 – 6 October 1998
G	1	(United States)	Ball, LaMelo	6 ft 5 in (1.96 m)	170 lb (77 kg)	24 – 22 August 2001

Head coach

- (United States) Doyle Balthazar

Assistant coach(es)

- (United States) Rasul Salahuddin

Legend

- (C) Team captain
- Injured

- Roster
Updated: August 3, 2018
