= Junior Basketball Association =

American professional basketball league for high-school and junior college players

- Most recent season or competition: 2019 JBA season
- Official logo featuring Lonzo Ball
- Sport: Basketball
- Founded: December 20, 2017; 8 years ago
- Founder: LaVar Ball
- First season: 2018
- Folded: 2019
- Director: LaVar Ball
- Commissioner: LaVar Ball
- No. of teams: 8
- Country: United States
- Headquarters: Los Angeles, CA
- Last champion: Los Angeles Ballers (2018)
- Broadcaster: Facebook Watch
- Sponsor: Big Baller Brand
- Website: www.jbaleagueofficial.com

The Junior Basketball Association (JBA) was an American basketball league that intended to be an alternative to the NCAA by allowing high school and junior college players to immediately play professionally. The league was first announced in December 2017 by LaVar Ball and was said to be fully funded by Ball's sports apparel company, Big Baller Brand. The JBA existed for just one season in 2018, featuring eight teams from major US cities.

While the league has not formally folded, no future seasons have been announced. The JBA faced criticism from within for failing to honor its contracts and pay its players and is widely seen as having been created solely as a platform for LaVar Ball's sons, disregarding the futures and livelihoods of the sixty other players in the competition. With the discontinuation of the league, former JBA players were left without a job and their brief $3,000 per month income removed their eligibility for NCAA basketball scholarships.

== History ==
On December 20, 2017, SLAM magazine had first reported on the formation of the Junior Basketball Association after being sent a statement from LaVar Ball, the chief executive officer (CEO) of Big Baller Brand and father to former Chicago Bulls player Lonzo Ball and his brothers, LiAngelo and LaMelo Ball. According to Ball, his decision to launch the league was prompted by comments from Mark Emmert, president of the NCAA. Earlier in the month, Emmert had remarked on LiAngelo's departure from UCLA following a shoplifting arrest in China: "Is this a part of someone being part of your university as a student-athlete or is it about using college athletics to prepare yourself to be a pro? If it's the latter, you shouldn't be there in the first place."

The JBA was established as an alternative route for top amateur players to play professionally without having to compete at the college level for no money. During the 2018 season, each player was promised $3,000 per month, and 60 percent of their jersey sales, in addition to other endorsement deals. The JBA was fully funded by Big Baller Brand, and players were required to wear the brand's merchandise. The league was expected to pay for travel, food, and lodging expenses, although the source of its finances was not disclosed. Its official logo features LaVar Ball's son Lonzo.

On February 2, 2018, it was revealed that the JBA had directly messaged about 80 blue-chip high school basketball players through Twitter about potentially joining its league, with a vast majority declining the offer and none of them ultimately accepting. The league appointed former National Basketball Association (NBA) players Ed O'Bannon and Earl Watson, along with Lonzo Ball, to its advisory board and selection committee for choosing players who will compete in the league. In its inaugural tryouts, the JBA most notably signed Greg Floyd Jr., a four-star recruit from Las Vegas, and Kezo Brown, a Chicago native and former three-star point guard for Simeon Career Academy. The founder's youngest son LaMelo, a former five-star recruit with professional experience, also joined, being labeled by the league as its "marquee player."

Near the halfway mark of the 2018 JBA season, LaMelo's older brother LiAngelo Ball joined the league after previously stating that he would not participate.

The league's website was inactive for some time, however, the website has since relaunched but only sells JBA merchandise. The league has not made any official announcements of future seasons or if it has folded completely.

== Teams ==
Location of venues for 2018 season

The 2018 JBA season consisted of eight teams, with each representing an American city and having the nickname "Ballers." Teams did not occupy a specified home arena; instead, every team faced each other in ten different arenas across the United States.

Team	Home city	Colors	Head coach
Atlanta Ballers	Atlanta, Georgia		(United States) Douglas Byrd
Chicago Ballers	Chicago, Illinois		(United States) Eddie Denard (United States) Nicolas Colon
Dallas Ballers	Dallas, Texas		(United States) Ray Johnson
Houston Ballers	Houston, Texas		(United States) Everett Rick
Los Angeles Ballers	Los Angeles, California		(United States) Doyle Balthazar
New York Ballers	New York City, New York		(United States) Marvin McCullough
Philadelphia Ballers	Philadelphia, Pennsylvania		(United States) James Martin
Seattle Ballers	Seattle, Washington		(United States) Charles O'Bannon

== Format ==
The JBA was made up of eight teams, with up to 10 players on each roster. The league only allowed players between the ages of 16 and 21 and accepts graduating seniors or students working towards a General Educational Development (GED), with rare exceptions being included. All teams featured players primarily handpicked from tryouts held before the season. According to the league, players who fail to play professional basketball would be able to work for Big Baller Brand.

The 2018 JBA season included an All-Star Game, playoffs, and finals. The regular season included eight games per team, with games taking place in venues across the United States. The champions of the inaugural season, the Los Angeles Ballers, were given Cadillac ATS vehicles as a reward from the league. Following an eight-team playoffs tournament, which concluded in August, the league scheduled a 28-game international tour from September to December 2018 in which its top players would face several European and Asian professional teams.

Through the 2018 season, the JBA aired games through Facebook Live with Allen Bell from the "AB the HERO" YouTube channel and Brandon Williams from "Fresh Sports Talk" as the broadcasters for each game.

== Reception ==
Shortly after JBA was announced in December 2017, Mike Golic of ESPN was among those who expressed doubts about the league's future. The Niagara Gazette considered the league as "ambitious, but not original." On the other hand, The Root considered Ball's idea "genius," and Salon believed that the JBA could "force NCAA reform." Lonzo Ball, son of the JBA's founder, suggested that he would have preferred the JBA over college basketball had that option been around at the time. During the 2018 JBA season, multiple NBA players commented on the league, including CJ McCollum and Metta World Peace. In addition, Trae Young of the Atlanta Hawks attended a JBA game in Las Vegas.

JBA tickets, which cost $99 for courtside seats, $59 for center court, and $40 for above center court, were criticized as "unreasonably expensive" by the USA Today website For the Win. The website also labeled JBA ticket sales as "comically abysmal," with over 90 percent of seats still being available less than three weeks before the season opener. The New York Post wrote, "In what should come a surprise to no one, LaVar Ball is struggling to find an audience with his newly launched Junior Basketball Association."

On August 16, 2018, Brandon Phillips, who was cut by the Los Angeles Ballers in the middle of the season to make way for LiAngelo Ball, alleged that he was only paid one-third of his promised salary while having to pay for travel costs. He later expressed regret for giving up his college basketball eligibility for a single paycheck of $1,000.

Although the players were promised the proceeds of 60% of their jersey sales, no retail versions of JBA jerseys were ever produced or put on sale to the public.

Following the end of the JBA, former Los Angeles Ballers player LaMelo Ball would be the only prospect from the JBA to have ever been drafted into the NBA, being taken as the third overall pick of the 2020 NBA draft (though representing the Illawarra Hawks in Australia following the JBA's collapse) and being selected as an All-Star in 2022. Former Los Angeles Ballers player LiAngelo Ball and Houston Ballers player Curtis Hollis would also be the only other players from this league to reach as far as the NBA G League, the official development league of the NBA. Former Dallas Ballers player Nyang Wek would also currently be the only player from this league to represent a national team as well, with him representing South Sudan. Outside of them, very few players from the JBA would see international play elsewhere, let alone continue their basketball careers following the JBA's collapse.
