= Big Baller Brand International Tournament =

Basketball tournament in Lithuania

- Date: February 25–27, 2018
- Duration: February 25–27, 2018
- Venue: Prienai Arena
- Location: Prienai, Lithuania; 54°38′52″N 23°57′41″E
- Patrons: Big Baller Brand; Facebook; Ballislife.com
- Organised by: Vytautas Prienai–Birštonas
- Participants: 4 teams

The Big Baller Brand International Tournament was a round-robin basketball tournament hosted by Vytautas Prienai–Birštonas of the Lithuanian Basketball League (LKL) that featured three teams from different European countries. It began on February 25 and ended on February 27, 2018, with a total of six games and three games per team. The competition took place at Prienai Arena in Prienai, Lithuania, with the games featuring Vytautas being streamed through Facebook.

Wilki Morskie Szczecin, who play in the Polish Basketball League (PLK), claimed the tournament title after winning all three games and defeating runners-up, the Latvian second-tier VEF Rīga Skola, 94–74 in the deciding game. Slovenian team Helios Suns Domžale and hosts Vytautas Prienai–Birštonas finished in third and fourth place respectively.

== History ==
Following the Big Baller Brand Challenge Games, a series of exhibition games hosted by Vytautas Prienai–Birštonas in January 2018 to feature new American signees LaMelo and LiAngelo Ball, it was announced that the team was planning to hold a similar competition at the end of February. At the time, Vytautas offered several top European youth clubs to participate, and in the following weeks, it was revealed that they had also invited Italian teams. In addition, Vytautas attempted to bring Lithuanian Basketball League (LKL) teams to the competition, but according to team general manager Adomas Kubilius, they turned down the invitations for financial reasons and due to the lack of defense in the exhibition games. On February 19, 2018, Vytautas officially announced the Big Baller Brand International Tournament. The tournament was played in a single round-robin format, with each team meeting all the other teams one time and final standings being determined by record.

The Big Baller Brand International Tournament was sponsored by Big Baller Brand, a sports apparel company owned by LaVar Ball, the father of Vytautas players LaMelo and LiAngelo Ball. LaVar Ball also assumed the head coaching position for Vytautas during the tournament. The games that featured Vytautas were streamed live on Facebook through the Ballislife.com page.

== Venue ==
Prienai, Lithuania	Big Baller Brand International Tournament (Europe)
Prienai Arena	Big Baller Brand International Tournament (Europe)
Capacity: 1,500	Big Baller Brand International Tournament (Europe)

== Teams ==
The tournament featured four teams, with the three visiting clubs being based outside of Lithuania. VEF Rīga Skola, the youth team of VEF Rīga, was among the competitors.

Team	Country	League (2017–18)
Helios Suns Domžale	Slovenia	Slovenian Basketball League
Vytautas Prienai–Birštonas	Lithuania	Lithuanian Basketball League
VEF Rīga Skola	Latvia	Latvian Basketball League-2
Wilki Morskie Szczecin	Poland	Polish Basketball League

== First round ==
=== Helios Suns Domžale vs. Wilki Morskie Szczecin ===
25 February 2018	Helios Suns Domžale (Slovenia)	75–80	(Poland) Wilki Morskie Szczecin	Prienai, Lithuania
18:00 (EET)	Scoring by quarter: 22–21, 12-24, 24–13, 17–22
	Pts: Pelko 27; Rebs: Đumić 7 Asts: Pelko 8	Boxscore	Pts: Benjamin 17; Rebs: Benjamin 10; Asts: Bartosz 5	Arena: Prienai Arena; Attendance: 200; Referees: Juozas Barkauskas (LTU), Šarūnas Gabrilavičius (LTU), Mantas Butvilas (LTU)

Starters:			Pts	Reb	Ast
PG	6	(Slovenia) Matej Rojc	0	0	0
SG	7	(Slovenia) Jure Pelko	27	2	8
SF	4	(Slovenia) Jaka Brodnik	14	4	1
PF	10	(Slovenia) Urban Oman	6	6	2
C	15	(Serbia) Božo Đumić	11	7	0
Reserves:					
PG	17	(Slovenia) Nejc Klavžar	4	2	1
PF	24	(Slovenia) Jure Besedič	11	2	2
C	32	(Russia) Alexander Shashkov	0	3	0
SF	51	(Slovenia) Jakob Strel	2	0	1
C	8	(Slovenia) Adrian Jogan	DNP		
Head coach:
(Basketball Federation of Serbia) Jovan Beader

Helios Suns Domžale	Wilki Morskie Szczecin

Starters:			Pts	Reb	Ast
PG	3	(United States) Carlos Medlock	9	1	1
SG	8	(Lithuania) Martynas Paliukėnas	2	3	4
SF	11	(Poland) Paweł Kikowski	15	2	2
PF	6	(Lithuania) Tauras Jogėla	9	4	3
C	34	(United States) Darrell Harris	13	3	0
Reserves:					
C	31	(United States) Kyle Benjamin	17	10	2
SF	92	(Lithuania) Kostas Jonuška	6	3	1
PF	15	(Poland) Mateusz Bartosz	9	9	5
PG	7	(Poland) Sebastian Kowalczyk	1	1	1
SG	12	(Poland) Maciej Majcherek	0	0	0
SF	20	(Poland) Łukasz Diduszko	DNP		
PF	25	(Poland) Maciej Adamkiewicz	DNP		
Head coach:
(Lithuanian Basketball Federation) Mindaugas Budzinauskas

=== Vytautas Prienai–Birštonas vs. VEF Rīga Skola ===
In both teams' debut at the Big Baller brand International Tournament, VEF Rīga Skola defeated Vytautas Prienai–Birštonas with a final score of 144−133. VEF Skola was spearheaded by Nikolajs Zotovs, who led his team with 29 points and 14 assists, along with 10 turnovers. The visiting side was also headlined by Klāvs Čavars and Arnolds Helmanis, who both recorded double-doubles while scoring 25 or more points. Edvinas Šeškus paced Vytautas with 35 points, shooting 13-of-20 from the field, while LiAngelo and LaMelo Ball scored 32 and 31 points respectively. Vytautas led by as many as 29 points in the first quarter, but after the hosts substituted all five starters, VEF Skola quickly reduced their deficit. The offense-driven game marked LaVar Ball's first loss as an assistant or head coach, as he won two games holding either position in the Big Baller Brand Challenge Games.

25 February 2018	Vytautas Prienai–Birštonas (Lithuania)	133–141	(Latvia) VEF Rīga Skola	Prienai, Lithuania
21:00 (EET)	Scoring by quarter: 49–25, 22–38, 31–32, 31–46
	Pts: Šeškus 35; Rebs: Miniotas 13; Asts: La. Ball 8	Boxscore	Pts: Zotovs 29; Rebs: Čavars 12; Asts: Zotovs 14	Arena: Prienai Arena; Attendance: 800; Referees: Jurgis Laurinavičius (LTU), Juozas Barkauskas (LTU), Mantas Butvilas (LTU)

Starters:			Pts	Reb	Ast
PG	1	(United States) LaMelo Ball	31	5	8
SG	3	(United States) LiAngelo Ball	32	5	4
SF	9	(Lithuania) Edvinas Šeškus	35	3	3
PF	22	(Lithuania) Regimantas Miniotas	3	13	2
C	55	(Haiti) Kervin Bristol	2	7	1
Reserves:					
SF	31	(Lithuania) Justas Sinica	14	1	0
PG	16	(Albania) Rashaun Broadus	7	1	7
SF	6	(Lithuania) Eigirdas Žukauskas	3	5	7
PF	11	(Lithuania) Egidijus Dimša	6	8	0
PG	5	(Lithuania) Gediminas Maceina	0	1	2
SG	33	(Lithuania) Tomas Dimša	0	0	0
SF	7	(Lithuania) Bartas Aleksandravičius	DNP		
Head coach:
(USA Basketball) LaVar Ball

Vytautas Prienai–Birštonas	VEF Rīga Skola

Starters:			Pts	Reb	Ast
PG	9	(Latvia) Nikolajs Zotovs	29	7	14
SG	10	(Latvia) Eduards Hāzners	24	2	6
SF	7	(Latvia) Arnolds Helmanis	25	10	0
PF	55	(Latvia) Niks Jansons	10	7	3
C	33	(Latvia) Klāvs Čavars	27	12	0
Reserves:					
SG	15	(Latvia) Oskars Hlebovickis	9	4	1
SF	21	(Latvia) Francis Lācis	8	6	2
SG	1	(Latvia) Rodrigo Būmeisters	2	7	5
C	14	(Latvia) Maksims Hudins	4	5	1
PF	18	(Latvia) Niks Līnis	3	1	0
PG	30	(Latvia) Emils Krūminš	0	0	0
C	20	(Latvia) Māris Ramanis	0	0	0
Head coach:
(Latvian Basketball Association) Raimonds Feldmanis

== Second round ==
=== Helios Suns Domžale vs. VEF Rīga Skola ===
26 February 2018	Helios Suns Domžale (Slovenia)	89–94(OT)	(Latvia) VEF Rīga Skola	Prienai, Lithuania
18:00 (EET)	Scoring by quarter: 22–21, 25–27, 18–15, 14–16, Overtime: 10–15
	Pts: Đumić 22; Rebs: Brodnik 11; Asts: Pelko 5	Boxscore	Pts: Zotovs 30; Rebs: Hlebovickis 8 Asts: Zotovs 8	Arena: Prienai Arena; Attendance: 150; Referees: Gvidas Gedvilas (LTU), Ignas Davainis (LTU), Andžej Urbanovič (LTU)

Starters:			Pts	Reb	Ast
PG	17	(Slovenia) Nejc Klavžar	6	3	1
SG	7	(Slovenia) Jure Pelko	18	7	5
SF	4	(Slovenia) Jaka Brodnik	21	11	4
PF	10	(Slovenia) Urban Oman	7	4	1
C	24	(Slovenia) Jure Besedič	4	3	1
Reserves:					
C	15	(Slovenia) Božo Đumić	22	5	2
C	32	(Russia) Alexander Shashkov	11	6	3
SF	51	(Slovenia) Jakob Strel	0	1	1
C	8	(Slovenia) Adrian Jogan	DNP		
PG	6	(Slovenia) Matej Rojc	DNP		
Head coach:
(Basketball Federation of Serbia) Jovan Beader

Helios Suns Domžale	VEF Rīga Skola

Starters:			Pts	Reb	Ast
PG	9	(Latvia) Nikolajs Zotovs	30	7	8
SG	10	(Latvia) Eduards Hāzners	25	3	3
SF	21	(Latvia) Francis Lācis	6	6	2
PF	55	(Latvia) Niks Jansons	0	1	0
C	33	(Latvia) Klāvs Čavars	15	5	1
Reserves:					
SG	15	(Latvia) Oskars Hlebovickis	13	8	0
SG	1	(Latvia) Rodrigo Būmeisters	3	2	3
C	20	(Latvia) Māris Ramanis	2	4	0
C	14	(Latvia) Maksims Hudins	0	2	0
PF	18	(Latvia) Niks Līnis	0	0	0
PG	30	(Latvia) Emils Krūminš	0	0	0
SF	7	(Latvia) Arnolds Helmanis	DNP		
Head coach:
(Latvian Basketball Association) Raimonds Feldmanis

=== Vytautas Prienai–Birštonas vs. Wilki Morskie Szczecin ===
In the final game of the second round, Wilki Morskie Szczecin improved to 2–0 in the tournament with a decisive 32-point victory over Vytautas Prienai–Birštonas. The winning team was led by Tauras Jogėla, who chipped in a team-high 24 points, and Kyle Benjamin, who notched a double-double of 14 points and 14 rebounds. For Vytautas, LiAngelo Ball led all scorers with 26 points in 40 minutes, shooting 1-of-9 from the three-point line. In 28 minutes, LaMelo Ball recorded nine assists to lead his team, but shot 0-of-7 on three-pointers and had 10 points before being sidelined with a leg injury.

26 February 2018	Vytautas Prienai–Birštonas (Lithuania)	96–128	(Poland) Wilki Morskie Szczecin	Prienai, Lithuania
21:00 (EET)	Scoring by quarter: 24–34, 24–27, 30–32, 18–35
	Pts: Li. Ball 26; Rebs: Miniotas 7 Asts: La. Ball 9	Boxscore	Pts: Jogėla 24; Rebs: Benjamin 14; Asts: Paliukėnas 8	Arena: Prienai Arena; Attendance: 500; Referees: Jurgis Laurinavičius (LTU), Juozas Barkauskas (LTU), Šarūnas Gabrilavičius (LTU)

Starters:			Pts	Reb	Ast
PG	1	(United States) LaMelo Ball	10	5	9
SG	3	(United States) LiAngelo Ball	26	5	0
SF	9	(Lithuania) Edvinas Šeškus	16	1	2
PF	22	(Lithuania) Regimantas Miniotas	13	7	2
C	55	(Haiti) Kervin Bristol	6	6	0
Reserves:					
PF	11	(Lithuania) Egidijus Dimša	13	4	0
SF	31	(Lithuania) Justas Sinica	7	3	3
PG	16	(Albania) Rashaun Broadus	5	2	6
SF	6	(Lithuania) Eigirdas Žukauskas	0	3	0
SF	7	(Lithuania) Bartas Aleksandravičius	0	0	0
PG	5	(Lithuania) Gediminas Maceina	DNP		
SG	33	(Lithuania) Tomas Dimša	DNP		
Head coach:
(USA Basketball) LaVar Ball

Vytautas Prienai–Birštonas	Wilki Morskie Szczecin

Starters:			Pts	Reb	Ast
PG	3	(United States) Carlos Medlock	20	1	4
SG	8	(Lithuania) Martynas Paliukėnas	18	3	8
SF	11	(Poland) Paweł Kikowski	18	2	5
PF	6	(Lithuania) Tauras Jogėla	24	5	1
C	31	(United States) Kyle Benjamin	14	14	1
Reserves:					
SF	20	(Poland) Łukasz Diduszko	13	7	2
PG	7	(Poland) Sebastian Kowalczyk	7	1	3
C	34	(United States) Darrell Harris	2	4	0
SF	92	(Lithuania) Kostas Jonuška	4	0	2
PF	15	(Poland) Mateusz Bartosz	3	4	2
SG	12	(Poland) Maciej Majcherek	3	1	1
PF	25	(Poland) Maciej Adamkiewicz	2	3	1
Head coach:
(Lithuanian Basketball Federation) Mindaugas Budzinauskas

== Third round ==
=== Wilki Morskie Szczecin vs. VEF Rīga Skola ===
27 February 2018	Wilki Morskie Szczecin (Poland)	94–74	(Latvia) VEF Rīga Skola	Prienai, Lithuania
18:00 (EET)	Scoring by quarter: 23–20, 20–20, 24–21, 27–13
	Pts: Benjamin 23; Rebs: Benjamin 7 Asts: Kowalczyk, Paliukėnas 4	Boxscore	Pts: Hāzners 18; Rebs: Čavars 9 Asts: Lācis, Zotovs 3	Arena: Prienai Arena; Attendance: 100

Starters:			Pts	Reb	Ast
PG	7	(Poland) Sebastian Kowalczyk	11	3	4
SG	20	(Poland) Łukasz Diduszko	4	4	1
SF	11	(Poland) Paweł Kikowski	12	1	3
PF	6	(Lithuania) Tauras Jogėla	14	4	2
C	31	(United States) Kyle Benjamin	23	7	0
Reserves:					
PG	3	(United States) Carlos Medlock	12	5	3
SG	8	(Lithuania) Martynas Paliukėnas	13	2	4
SF	92	(Lithuania) Kostas Jonuška	2	3	2
SG	12	(Poland) Maciej Majcherek	3	2	0
PF	25	(Poland) Maciej Adamkiewicz	0	1	1
C	34	(United States) Darrell Harris	DNP		
PF	15	(Poland) Mateusz Bartosz	DNP		
Head coach:
(Lithuanian Basketball Federation) Mindaugas Budzinauskas

Wilki Morskie Szczecin	VEF Rīga Skola

Starters:			Pts	Reb	Ast
PG	9	(Latvia) Nikolajs Zotovs	14	5	3
SG	10	(Latvia) Eduards Hāzners	18	2	1
SF	21	(Latvia) Francis Lācis	4	4	3
PF	55	(Latvia) Niks Jansons	3	1	2
C	33	(Latvia) Klāvs Čavars	14	9	1
Reserves:					
SG	15	(Latvia) Oskars Hlebovickis	10	6	2
SG	1	(Latvia) Rodrigo Būmeisters	9	2	0
C	20	(Latvia) Māris Ramanis	2	2	0
PF	18	(Latvia) Niks Līnis	0	2	1
C	14	(Latvia) Maksims Hudins	0	0	0
PG	30	(Latvia) Emils Krūminš	0	0	0
SF	7	(Latvia) Arnolds Helmanis	DNP		
Head coach:
(Latvian Basketball Association) Raimonds Feldmanis

=== Vytautas Prienai–Birštonas vs. Helios Suns Domžale ===
In the concluding game of the Big Baller Brand International Tournament, the Helios Suns Domžale left the tournament with a third-place finish over Vytautas with a 96–87 win. The Helios Suns were led by Urban Oman and Nejc Klavžar with 22 points each, the latter of whom also tied Božo Đumić for assists with 6 each; Đumić also led the team with 8 rebounds. In the aftermath of Vytautas' previous game in the tournament, LaMelo Ball did not play the last game of the tournament. LiAngelo Ball led all scorers with 30 points, while Kervin Bristol led all players with 14 rebounds and Gediminas Maceina recorded a double-double with 11 points and a game-leading 10 assists.

27 February 2018	Vytautas Prienai–Birštonas (Lithuania)	87–96	(Slovenia) Helios Suns Domžale	Prienai, Lithuania
21:00 (EET)	Scoring by quarter: 21–23, 26–22, 23–23, 17–28
	Pts: Li. Ball 30; Rebs: Bristol 14; Asts: Maceina 10		Pts: Oman, Klavžar 22; Rebs: Đumić 8 Asts: Klavžar, Đumić 6	Arena: Prienai Arena

Starters:			Pts	Reb	Ast
PG	5	(Lithuania) Gediminas Maceina	11	5	10
SG	3	(United States) LiAngelo Ball	30	8	1
SF	9	(Lithuania) Edvinas Šeškus	19	0	0
PF	22	(Lithuania) Regimantas Miniotas	9	10	1
C	55	(Haiti) Kervin Bristol	8	14	1
Reserves:					
SF	31	(Lithuania) Justas Sinica	3	2	0
PG	16	(Albania) Rashaun Broadus	0	1	4
SF	6	(Lithuania) Eigirdas Žukauskas	2	0	1
PF	11	(Lithuania) Egidijus Dimša	5	3	0
SG	33	(Lithuania) Tomas Dimša	DNP		
PG	1	(United States) LaMelo Ball	DNP		
SF	7	(Lithuania) Bartas Aleksandravičius	DNP		
Head coach:
(USA Basketball) LaVar Ball

Vytautas Prienai–Birštonas	Helios Suns Domžale

Starters:			Pts	Reb	Ast
PG	17	(Slovenia) Nejc Klavžar	22	5	6
SG	7	(Slovenia) Jure Pelko	16	5	2
SF	4	(Slovenia) Jaka Brodnik	14	6	5
PF	10	(Slovenia) Urban Oman	22	7	2
C	24	(Slovenia) Jure Besedič	2	3	2
Reserves:					
C	15	(Slovenia) Božo Đumić	9	8	6
C	32	(Russia) Alexander Shashkov	2	3	1
SF	51	(Slovenia) Jakob Strel	8	0	1
C	8	(Slovenia) Adrian Jogan	1	1	0
PG	6	(Slovenia) Matej Rojc	DNP		
Head coach:
(Basketball Federation of Serbia) Jovan Beader

== Standings ==
Rank	Team	Record
1st place, gold medalist(s)	(Poland) Wilki Morskie Szczecin	3–0
2nd place, silver medalist(s)	(Latvia) VEF Rīga Skola	2–1
3rd place, bronze medalist(s)	(Slovenia) Helios Suns Domžale	1–2
4th	(Lithuania) Vytautas Prienai–Birštonas	0–3

== See also ==
- Big Baller Brand Challenge Games
