= Harrison Gaines =

American basketball player (born 1989)

- Born: Harrison Burwell Gaines; April 27, 1989 (age 37); San Bernardino County, California, U.S.
- Education: University of Pennsylvania (B.A.); University of California, Riverside; Thomas Jefferson School of Law (J.D.)
- Occupations: Attorney and Sports Agent
- Years active: 2016–present

Harrison Burwell Gaines (born April 27, 1989) is an American attorney, sports agent, and former basketball player who is the founder and chief executive officer of sports agency SLASH Sports & Entertainment. A native of Victorville, California, Gaines was a standout point guard at Serrano High School. He played college basketball with Penn before transferring to UC Riverside for his final two seasons. He later attended Thomas Jefferson School of Law.

== Early life ==
Gaines was born to Harry and Stephanie Gaines on April 27, 1989, and grew up in Victorville, California. From a young age, he became interested in basketball, watching game tape of Michael Jordan at age three. In his childhood, his mother introduced him to acting and modeling, and he played a minor role in the 1999 film Michael Jordan: An American Hero as a young Jordan.

== High school career ==
Gaines attended Serrano High School in Phelan, California, where he played four years of varsity basketball as a point guard under head coach Mike Browning. He became his team's leading scorer only as a freshman. For his sophomore year, Gaines was promoted to team captain, a position he held until graduating. During the season, he averaged 23.6 points and 5.2 assists per game, among the top in Southern California, and he featured in the Los Angeles Times column for his accomplishments.

Prior to his junior year, Gaines was rated the second-best point guard in the region. He recorded 18 points and 6 assists in a win over Sultana High School on January 11, 2006. During the season, he broke the school record for most career points, finishing with 2,086 points by the end of his high school years. On January 17, 2007, as a senior, Gaines scored 30 points and grabbed 7 rebounds to defeat Hesperia High School. In his sophomore, junior, and senior seasons, he was named Mojave River League most valuable player, Daily Press Athlete of the Year, and first-team All-California Interscholastic Federation (CIF). He led Serrano to three straight league titles and a combined 48–9 record in his final two years. Gaines also saw success academically, leaving high school with a 3.7 grade point average (GPA).

College recruiting
Name	Hometown	School	Height	Weight	Commit date
Harrison Gaines; PG	Victorville, California	Serrano (CA)	6 ft 0.5 in (1.84 m)	180 lb (82 kg)	Oct 10, 2006
Harrison Gaines; PG	Recruit ratings: 247Sports:				
Overall recruit ranking: 247Sports: 432, 94 (PG), 44 (CA)
Note: In many cases, Scout, Rivals, 247Sports, On3, and ESPN may conflict in their listings of height and weight.; In these cases, the average was taken. ESPN grades are on a 100-point scale.; Sources: "ESPN". ESPN.; "2007 Team Ranking". Rivals.

== College career ==
Rated a three-star recruit by 247Sports.com coming out of high school, Gaines committed to play for the Penn Quakers on October 10, 2006. By the summer of 2007, he had enrolled at the University of Pennsylvania. On November 20, 2007, Gaines recorded a season-high 12 assists to go with 9 points in a win over The Citadel. He scored a season-best 19 points twice in games against Cornell on February 9, 2008, and March 7. In his freshman season, Gaines averaged 6.7 points, 3.6 assists, 1.7 rebounds, and 0.7 steals per game, leading the Ivy League in assist-to-turnover ratio and earning Ivy League Rookie of the Week honors on two occasions.

In his second-year debut for the Quakers, the point guard posted 10 points, 2 rebounds, and 2 assists in a loss to North Carolina. On February 27, 2009, against Yale, Gaines had a career-high 24 points, shooting 10-of-15 from the field. As a sophomore, he averaged 9.9 points, 2.2 rebounds, 1.4 assists, and 0.4 steals per game. He finished second on the team in points and 14th in the Ivy League. In March 2009, Gaines announced plans to transfer from Penn, later expressing dissatisfaction because they moved him to the shooting guard position. He stated, "I need to attend a school where I have confidence in the basketball team's leaders."

Gaines began playing for the UC Riverside Highlanders starting in the 2010–11 season, after redshirting one year. However, his playing time decreased upon the arrival of Santa Clara transfer Robert Smith. He made his UC Riverside debut on November 12, 2010, against UNLV, scoring 5 points in 20 minutes. After playing only 15 games in his junior season, he was averaging 2.3 points, 1.1 rebounds, and 0.7 assists in 7.8 minutes per game.

As a senior for the Highlanders, in 13.3 minutes per game, Gaines averaged 3.8 points, 2.0 rebounds, and 1.3 assists. He notched a career-high with his new team on November 27, 2011, contributing 13 points against Washington State.

== Sports management ==
"My specific role is handling all NBA representation with the Ball family and I stay in my lane as far as that nature. But I think for me, how I view athlete representation, it's about the player, it's about the client. And for me, it starts with basketball, everything starts with the game."

— Gaines in an ESPN interview as Lonzo Ball's agent.

Shortly after leaving college, Gaines founded the sports agency SLASH Sports & Entertainment and became the agent to former NBA player Jamaal Franklin. In April 2017, it was announced that he would be a part of the representation team for Lonzo Ball, who was projected to be a top pick at the 2017 NBA draft. He began working with Ball with a company created by the client's father LaVar Ball called Ball Sports Group. Gaines had met the Ball family while attending Thomas Jefferson School of Law and was specifically picked for the job by LaVar. After the news was released, he headlined in stories by ESPN and Sports Illustrated. On December 7, LaMelo and LiAngelo Ball, brothers to Lonzo, also signed with Gaines, choosing to forgo college. In the following weeks, after LiAngelo and LaMelo signed with the Lithuanian team Vytautas Prienai–Birštonas, Gaines featured in a piece for The New York Times. Gaines also became an important member for Lonzo and his family during a family situation relating to Alan Foster, a former friend of his and a co-founder of the Big Baller Brand that was reportedly stealing money from the business and family. He was then encouraged to take on more of an active role for Lonzo and his family in the upcoming future.

As of 2021, SLASH Sports has over 50 clients total ranging from the NBA, WNBA, and top international basketball leagues.
