= Ball in the Family =

2017 American reality web television series

- Genre: Reality
- Starring: Lonzo Ball; LiAngelo Ball; LaMelo Ball; LaVar Ball; Tina Ball
- Opening theme: "We Ballin" by Eric Tucker, Jay Vincent B, Sean Donatello
- Country of origin: United States
- Original language: English
- No. of seasons: 6
- No. of episodes: 116

Production
- Executive producers: Gil Goldschien; Julie Pizzi; Farnaz Farjam; Steve Ezell
- Producers: LaVar Ball; Tina Ball
- Production locations: Los Angeles, California; Chino Hills, California; Prienai, Lithuania; Birštonas, Lithuania; Kaunas, Lithuania; New Orleans, Louisiana
- Camera setup: Multi-camera
- Running time: 14–26 minutes
- Production company: Bunim/Murray Productions

Original release
- Network: Facebook Watch
- Release: August 29, 2017 – December 20, 2020

Ball in the Family is an American reality television series that premiered on August 29, 2017 on Facebook Watch. The show documents the personal and professional lives of LaVar Ball's family of basketball players. The sixth season premiered on October 18, 2020.

== Production ==
=== Development ===
On July 5, 2017, it was announced that Facebook had greenlit a then-untitled reality show starring the Ball family. The number and length of episodes had yet to be determined at the time. On October 17, 2017, it was announced that Facebook had renewed the show for a second season. On May 14, 2018, it was reported that the show had been renewed for a third season.

The show is referred to internally by Facebook as one of their "hero shows" alongside other programs such as Strangers and Returning the Favor.

=== Music ===
The series' theme song was "Big Bag" by Wes Period. A friend of Period's was working with the Ball family to find music for the show and told him about it. Period came to them with his song and they told him that they would use in the end credits of an episode. Instead, the producers of the series ended up making it the show's official theme.

== Cast ==
=== Main ===
- Lonzo Ball, the eldest son in the Ball family, and current guard for the Cleveland Cavaliers
- LiAngelo Ball, the middle son in the Ball family, and rapper.
- LaMelo Ball, the youngest son in the Ball family, and current point guard and guard for the Minnesota Timberwolves
- LaVar Ball, the patriarch of the Ball family, owner of Big Baller Brand, and founder of Junior Basketball Association
- Tina Ball, the matriarch of the Ball family

=== Recurring ===
- Denise Garcia, Lonzo's ex girlfriend and mother of his daughter
- Zoey Ball, Lonzo and Denise's baby daughter
- Alan Foster (seasons 1–4), LaVar's former business partner
- Darren "DMO" Moore, Lonzo's manager and family friend
- Horace, family friend
- Noni Slatinsky, Tina's mother
- Robert Slatinsky, Tina's father
- Anderson Ball, LaVar's father
- Maria Ball, LaVar's mother
- LaValle Ball, LaVar's brother
- Ren Ball, LaVar's brother
- 'Dre Ball, LaVar's brother
- Jhaylen Ball, LaVar's niece
- Andre Ball, LaVar's nephew

== Episodes ==
=== Series overview ===
Season	Episodes	Originally released	
Season	Episodes	First released	Last released
1	10	August 29, 2017	October 29, 2017
2	24	November 26, 2017	May 6, 2018
3	24	June 10, 2018	November 18, 2018
4	24	December 9, 2018	June 16, 2019
5	24	August 18, 2019	February 23, 2020
6	10	October 18, 2020	December 20, 2020

=== Season 1 (2017) ===
No. overall	No. in season	Title	Original release date
1	1	"Bittersweet Victory"	August 29, 2017
2	2	"Forging a Path"	August 31, 2017
3	3	"Wild Boy"	September 10, 2017
4	4	"All About the "W""	September 17, 2017
5	5	"The Making of a Leader"	September 24, 2017
6	6	"It Ain't Easy Being Zo"	October 1, 2017
7	7	"Back on Track"	October 8, 2017
8	8	"Big Ballin’ in Hawaii: Part 1"	October 15, 2017
9	9	"Big Ballin’ in Hawaii: Part 2"	October 22, 2017
10	10	"Happy Birthday, Big Boy"	October 29, 2017

=== Season 2 (2017–18) ===
No. overall	No. in season	Title	Original release date
11	1	"School's Out"	November 26, 2017
12	2	"The First 48 Hrs."	December 3, 2017
13	3	"Mr. Sweet Tooth"	December 10, 2017
14	4	"Happy Birthday, Lonzo!"	December 17, 2017
15	5	"Gelo Has Been Detained"	December 24, 2017
16	6	"A Mother's Love"	December 31, 2017
17	7	"Gelo's Fate"	January 7, 2018
18	8	"A Very Thankful Ballsgiving"	January 14, 2018
19	9	"Gelo's Birthday Wish"	January 21, 2018
20	10	"The Future of the Ball Boys"	January 28, 2018
21	11	"Melo and Gelo Go Pro"	February 4, 2018
22	12	"Strong Moves"	February 11, 2018
23	13	"A Big Baller Christmas"	February 18, 2018
24	14	"Welcome to Lithuania!"	February 25, 2018
25	15	"Fully Committed"	March 4, 2018
26	16	"The Two-Year Plan"	March 11, 2018
27	17	"Meeting Halfway"	March 18, 2018
28	18	"Tina's Courage"	March 25, 2018
29	19	"Baby Baller Alert!"	April 1, 2018
30	20	"London Bound"	April 8, 2018
31	21	"Fatherly Advice"	April 15, 2018
32	22	"Naming The Next Generation"	April 22, 2018
33	23	"Working Vacation"	April 29, 2018
34	24	"Draft Eligible"	May 6, 2018

=== Season 3 (2018) ===
No. overall	No. in season	Title	Original release date
35	1	"Izzy's Arrival"	June 10, 2018
36	2	"The Decision"	June 17, 2018
37	3	"Denise's Birthday Getaway"	June 24, 2018
38	4	"The Home Stretch"	July 1, 2018
39	5	"Farewell, Lithuania"	July 8, 2018
40	6	"Home Sweet Home"	July 15, 2018
41	7	"Welcome To The Family"	July 22, 2018
42	8	"Feelin' The Pressure"	July 29, 2018
43	9	"National Spotlight"	August 5, 2018
44	10	"Last Straw"	August 12, 2018
45	11	"Making History"	August 19, 2018
46	12	"Turn It Up"	August 26, 2018
47	13	"The Big Day"	September 2, 2018
48	14	"Growing Pains"	September 9, 2018
49	15	"Blow It Up"	September 16, 2018
50	16	"Reversal of Fortune"	September 23, 2018
51	17	"The Birth of Baby Zoey"	September 30, 2018
52	18	"Baby Phobia"	October 7, 2018
53	19	"Hopes and Dreams"	October 14, 2018
54	20	"Championship On The Line"	October 21, 2018
55	21	"Melo's Acting Out"	October 28, 2018
56	22	"Bora Bora Bound"	November 4, 2018
57	23	"Last Days in Paradise"	November 11, 2018
58	24	"The Break-up"	November 18, 2018

=== Season 4 (2018–19) ===
No. overall	No. in season	Title	Original release date
59	1	"Relationship Status"	December 9, 2018
60	2	"Collision Course"	December 16, 2018
61	3	"The Slap Heard Around the World"	December 23, 2018
62	4	"Baby Momma Drama"	December 30, 2018
63	5	"Denise is Moving to LA"	January 6, 2019
64	6	"Second Chances"	January 13, 2019
65	7	"Kanye West Is In The House"	January 20, 2019
66	8	"Melo Bomb"	January 27, 2019
67	9	"Hello Goodbye"	February 3, 2019
68	10	"Fresh Start"	February 10, 2019
69	11	"Little Big Head"	February 17, 2019
70	12	"Gelo's Big Decision"	February 24, 2019
71	13	"Lonzo and Denise Back Together"	March 3, 2019
72	14	"Long Distance Christmas"	March 10, 2019
73	15	"Home Away From Home"	April 14, 2019
74	16	"Meet The Parents"	April 21, 2019
75	17	"Talk To Me"	April 28, 2019
76	18	"Team Tina"	May 5, 2019
77	19	"A Storm Is Coming"	May 12, 2019
78	20	"Two's Company, Three's A Crowd"	May 19, 2019
79	21	"Road Blocks"	May 26, 2019
80	22	"End of an Era"	June 2, 2019
81	23	"The Three Amigos"	June 9, 2019
82	24	"An Enemy Within"	June 16, 2019

=== Season 5 (2019–20) ===
No. overall	No. in season	Title	Original release date
83	1	"The Great Divide"	August 18, 2019
84	2	"Housewarming Jitters"	August 25, 2019
85	3	"Striking a Balance"	September 1, 2019
86	4	"Tripped Up"	September 8, 2019
87	5	"In or Out?"	September 15, 2019
88	6	"Traded"	September 22, 2019
89	7	"Zo's Big News, Melo's Surprise Move"	September 29, 2019
90	8	"Hooked on a Feeling"	October 6, 2019
91	9	"Ready, Set, Pro!"	October 13, 2019
92	10	"Do I Stay Or Do I Go?"	October 20, 2019
93	11	"Ball Men vs The Wild"	October 27, 2019
94	12	"Hard Times In The Big Easy"	November 3, 2019
95	13	"Pro Mind-Set"	November 10, 2019
96	14	"Goodbye Boys"	November 17, 2019
97	15	"Stay Melo"	November 24, 2019
98	16	"Growing Pains"	December 1, 2019
99	17	"Hot Date"	January 5, 2020
100	18	"Keep It G3 Baby!"	January 12, 2020
101	19	"Ghosted"	January 19, 2020
102	20	"Talk to Me"	January 26, 2020
103	21	"Ballin' in the Big Easy"	February 2, 2020
104	22	"Mr. Big Mouth"	February 9, 2020
105	23	"All About Zoey"	February 16, 2020
106	24	"The Main Event"	February 23, 2020

=== Season 6 (2020) ===
No. overall	No. in season	Title	Original release date
107	1	"The Ball Family Bounces Back"	October 18, 2020
108	2	"Are Zo & Denise Getting Back Together?"	October 25, 2020
109	3	"BBB and BLM"	November 1, 2020
110	4	"Lonzo On Lockdown"	November 8, 2020
111	5	"New House, New Rules"	November 15, 2020
112	6	"Crossroads"	November 22, 2020
113	7	"Brand Nu Hope"	November 29, 2020
114	8	"PopUpProblems"	December 6, 2020
115	9	"A Birthday To Remember"	December 13, 2020
116	10	"The Big Day"	December 20, 2020

== Reception ==
=== Critical response ===
The first season was met with a generally positive reception from critics. Haley O'Shaughnessy of The Ringer wrote that the show "combines everything you'd expect with a touch of nuance and sympathy." Myron Medcalf of ESPN compared the show favorably to other Bunim/Murray production Keeping Up with the Kardashians saying that "unlike the Kardashians, who never really care about authenticity, Ball in the Family tries to be sympathetic to the Ball patriarch while showing his brashness isn't just there to generate social media buzz."

=== Viewership ===
The show premiered on Facebook Watch on August 29, 2017 and the first episode was viewed by more than 26 million people.

=== Awards and nominations ===
Year	Ceremony	Category	Recipient(s)	Result	Ref.
2018	22nd Annual Webby Awards	Film & Video: Reality	Ball in the Family	People's Voice Winner	

== See also ==
- List of original programs distributed by Facebook Watch
