= Raimonds Feldmanis =

Latvian basketball coach

Rīgas Zeļļi
- Position: Assistant coach
- League: LEBL

Personal information
- Born: April 4, 1982 (age 44) Rīga, Latvia
- Coaching career: 2011–present

Career history

Coaching
- 2011–2014: BA Turība (assistant)
- 2014–2015: BA Turība
- 2015–2017: VEF Rīga (assistant)
- 2017–2020: VEF Skola
- 2020–2023: BA Turība
- 2023–2025: Prometey (assistant)
- 2026–present: Rīgas Zeļļi (assistant)
Medals
Men's basketball
Representing Latvia
Summer Olympic Games
Gold medal – first place	2020 Tokyo - 3x3
World 3x3 Cup
Gold medal – first place	2026 Poland
Bronze medal – third place	2023 Austria
Silver medal – second place	2019 Netherlands
Europe Cup 3x3
Silver medal – second place	2025 Denmark
Bronze medal – third place	2023 Israel
Silver medal – second place	2022 Austria
Silver medal – second place	2018 Romania
2023 European Games
Gold medal – first place	2023 Poland
FIBA Europe Under-20 Championship
Silver medal – second place	2013 Estonia	National Team

Raimonds Feldmanis (born 4 April 1982 in Rīga) is a Latvian former professional basketball player and current coach, who helped Latvian 3x3 national team win gold medals in 2020 Summer Olympics. He currently works as an assistant coach for Rīgas Zeļļi of the Latvian–Estonian Basketball League (LEBL).

== Playing career ==
Feldmanis was a professional basketball player having played domestically for teams in Latvian Basketball League. He also had stints in Spain with teams from Liga EBA. Feldmanis won Latvian Basketball League title in 2010 with BK Barons.

== Coaching career ==
Feldmanis worked with professional and youth national teams in Latvia, developed several top European prospects, such as Rodions Kurucs. In 2017, Feldmanis won Latvian championship with VEF Rīga. In February 2018, Feldmanis coached VEF Skola at the Big Baller Brand International Tournament where his team debuted by erasing 29-point first quarter deficit in a game against Vytautas Prienai–Birštonas, a team that had LaMelo Ball on its roster. Feldmanis was part of the New Orleans Pelicans coaching staff twice in the NBA Summer League, in 2017 and 2018 respectively. In 2021, he led 3x3 Latvian National Team to the first-ever appearance in the Olympic Games where his team won the gold medal. 2023-2024 BC Prometey assistant coach

== Outside professional basketball ==
He is the founder of TRUBasketball, a non-profit basketball organization in Latvia that specializes in youth sports movement. Feldmanis contributed in publishing self-help book, Basketball Blueprint: A Complete Guide to Master Your Skills, in 2021.

== National level ==
- 2013: Latvia U-20 coach
- 2014: Latvian U-18 coach
- 2015: Latvian U-18 coach
- 2016: Latvian U-18 head coach
- 2017: Latvian U-20 coach
- 2019: Latvian U-20 head coach
- 2019–2021: Latvia national basketball team coach
- 2018–present: Latvia 3x3 national team head coach
- 2022: Ukraine national basketball team coach

== Achievements ==
- Silver in FIBA Europe Under-20 Championship (2013)
- Gold in Latvian Basketball League (2017)
- Silver in FIBA 3x3 Europe Cup (2018)
- Silver in FIBA 3x3 World Cup (2019)
- Gold in FIBA 3x3 World Tour (2020)
- Gold in Tokyo Olympic Games (2021)
- Silver in FIBA 3x3 U17 Europe Cup (2022)
- Silver in FIBA 3x3 Europe Cup (2022)
- Gold in Nacionālā basketbola līga (2023)
- Gold in European Games (2023)
- Bronze in FIBA 3x3 World Cup (2023)
- Bronze in FIBA 3x3 Europe Cup (2023)
- Gold in Latvian–Estonian Basketball League (2024)
- Silver in FIBA 3x3 Europe Cup (2025)
- Bronze in Latvian Basketball League (2026)
- Bronze in Nacionālā basketbola līga (2026)
- Gold in FIBA 3x3 World Cup (2026)

== Personal Awards ==
- Latvian Basketball Coach of the Year (2021) (2024)
- Coach of the Year in Latvia (2021)
