= Brodnik =

Brodnik is a surname. Notable people with the surname include:

- Jaka Brodnik (born 1992), Slovene basketball player
- Janez Brodnik (born 1944), Slovene gymnast
- Jože Brodnik (born 1936), Slovene decathlete
- Vanja Brodnik (born 1989), Slovene alpine ski racer

== See also ==
- Brodnici
