= Marko Tušek =

Slovenian basketball player

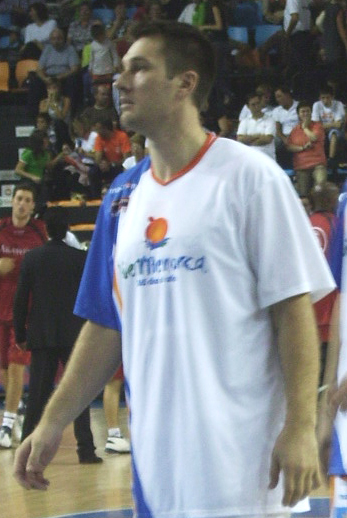
- Tušek with ViveMenorca in October 2007.

Personal information
- Born: July 17, 1975 (age 51) Trbovlje, SR Slovenia, SFR Yugoslavia
- Listed height: 6 ft 8 in (2.03 m)
- Listed weight: 260 lb (118 kg)

Career information
- NBA draft: 1997: undrafted
- Playing career: 1992–2012, 2015
- Position: Power forward

Career history
- 1989–1992: Hrastnik
- 1992–1993: Triglav Kranj
- 1993–1998: Union Olimpija
- 1998–2000: Pepsi Rimini
- 2000–2002: Scavolini Pesaro
- 2002–2006: Lottomatica Virtus Roma
- 2006–2007: Armani Jeans Milano
- 2007: Unicaja Málaga
- 2007: ViveMenorca
- 2007–2008: UNICS Kazan
- 2008–2009: Air Avellino
- 2009–2010: Cimberio Varese
- 2010–2011: Fileni Jesi
- 2011: Juvecaserta Basket
- 2011–2012: Vanoli-Braga Cremona
- 2015: Zeta 2011

Career highlights
- FIBA Saporta Cup winner (1994); 4× Slovenian League champion (1994, 1996–1998); 4× Slovenian Cup winner (1994, 1995, 1997, 1998)

Marko Tušek (born July 17, 1975) is a Slovenian former professional basketball player. Standing at 6 ft 8 in (2.03 m), he played at the power forward position. He also represented the Slovenian national team in international competitions.
