= Jure Pelko =

Slovenian basketball player

KD Ilirija
- Position: Shooting guard / point guard
- League: Premier A Slovenian Basketball League

Personal information
- Born: May 17, 1990 (age 36) Ptuj, SR Slovenia, SFR Yugoslavia
- Listed height: 1.90 m (6 ft 3 in)

Career information
- NBA draft: 2012: undrafted
- Playing career: 2006–present

Career history
- 2006–2009: Branik Maribor
- 2007–2009: →Hrastnik
- 2009–2011: Zlatorog Laško
- 2011–2013: Maribor Messer
- 2013–2014: Rogaška
- 2014–2015: Maribor Nova KMB
- 2015: Helios Suns
- 2015–2016: UBSC Raiffeisen Graz
- 2016–2017: Union Olimpija
- 2017–2018: Helios Suns
- 2018–2019: BK Olomoucko
- 2019–2020: Helios Suns
- 2020–2021: Rogaška
- 2021: Sutjeska
- 2021–2022: Bistrica
- 2022–present: KD Ilirija

Career highlights
- Slovenian League (2017); Slovenian Cup (2017)

Jure Pelko (born May 17, 1990) is a Slovenian professional basketball player for KD Ilirija of the Premier A Slovenian Basketball League. He is a 1.90 m tall combo guard.

== Professional career ==
In August 2016, he signed a one-year deal with Union Olimpija.

On June 21, 2017, he signed a two-years deal with Helios Suns. He played for BK Olomoucko in the 2018-19 season. Pelko spent the 2019-20 season with Helios Suns, averaging 12.4 points, 2.7 rebounds and 5.0 assists per game. On September 14, 2020, he signed with Rogaška.

In February 2021, he signed for Sutjeska. On December 17, Pelko signed with Bistrica. On January 27, 2022, he signed with KD Ilirija.
