= Matej Rojc =

Slovenian former professional basketball player

No. 6 – LTH Castings
- Position: Shooting guard / point guard
- League: Slovenian League

Personal information
- Born: February 17, 1993 (age 33) Koper, Slovenia
- Listed height: 6 ft 6 in (1.98 m)
- Listed weight: 190 lb (86 kg)

Career information
- NBA draft: 2015: undrafted
- Playing career: 2009–2022

Career history
- 2009–2010: SD Koš Koper
- 2010–2017: Krka
- 2017–2018: Helios Suns
- 2018–2019: Zlatorog Laško
- 2019–2020: Šenčur
- 2020: Koper Primorska
- 2020-2023: Šenčur
- 2023-present: Škofja Loka

Career highlights
- EuroChallenge champion (2011); 4× Slovenian League champion (2011–2014); 3× Slovenian Cup winner (2014–2016)

Matej Rojc is a Slovenian professional basketball player currently playing for KK Škofja Loka. He is a 1.98 m tall Point guard.
