= LaVar Ball =

American businessman (born 1967)

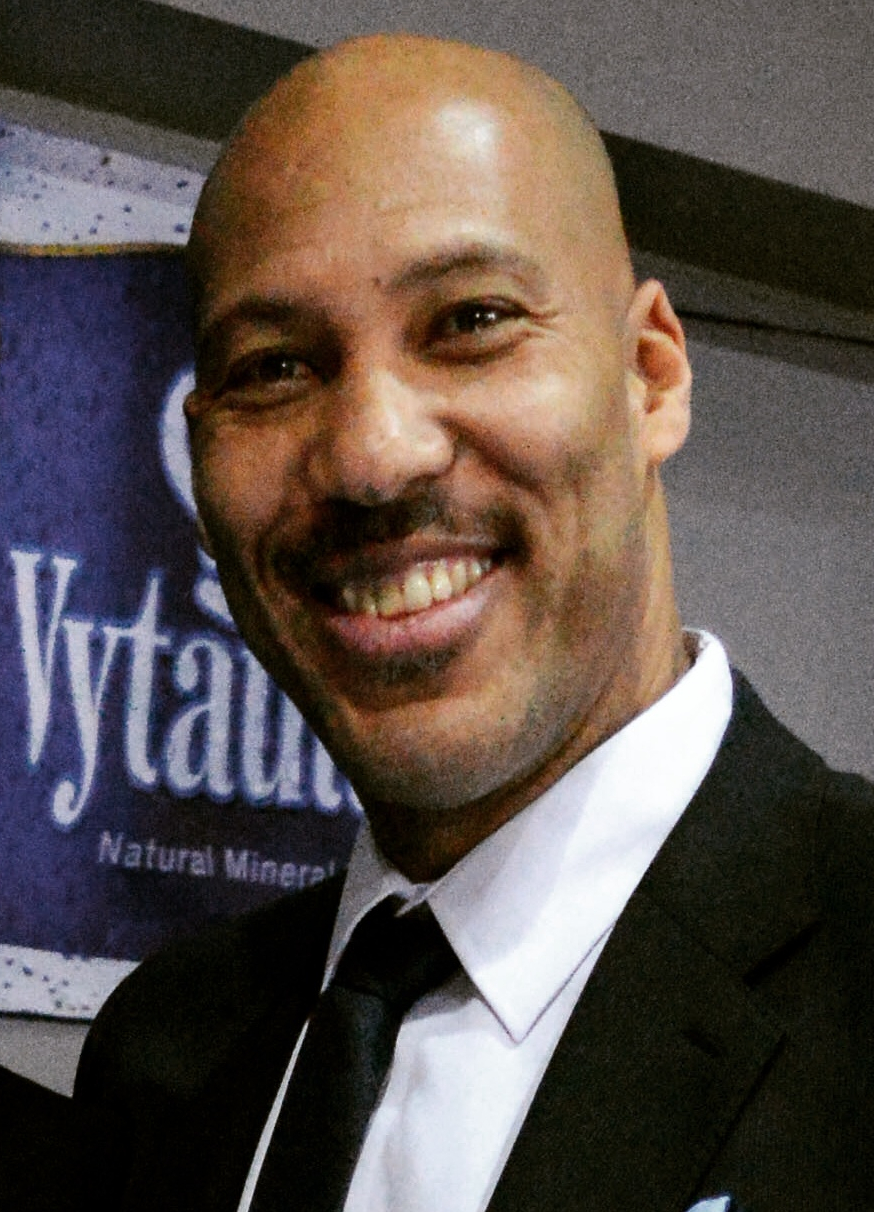
- Ball in 2017
- Born: LaVar Christopher Ball; October 23, 1967 (age 59); Los Angeles, California, U.S.
- Education: West Los Angeles College; Washington State University; California State University, Los Angeles
- Occupations: Co-founder and CEO of Big Baller Brand
- Children: Lonzo; LiAngelo; LaMelo
- Football career

No. 99
- Position: Tight end

Personal information
- Listed height: 6 ft 5 in (1.96 m)
- Listed weight: 270 lb (122 kg)

Career information
- High school: Canoga Park (Canoga Park, California)
- College: Cal State Los Angeles
- NFL draft: 1994: undrafted

Career history
- New York Jets (1994–1995)*; London Monarchs (WLAF) (1995); Carolina Panthers (1995)*
- * Offseason or practice squad member only

LaVar Christopher Ball (born October 23, 1967) is an American businessman who is the co-founder and chief executive officer (CEO) of sports apparel company Big Baller Brand and founder of the now defunct Junior Basketball Association (JBA). He is the father of professional basketball guards Lonzo and LaMelo Ball, the latter active for the Minnesota Timberwolves, while LiAngelo, his second son, is signed with Def Jam as a hip hop recording artist.

Ball played basketball and football while at Canoga Park High School, going on to play basketball at the collegiate level for West Los Angeles College, Washington State and Cal State Los Angeles. He also played football at Long Beach City College for a season. He had a brief professional career as a tight end with the London Monarchs of the World League of American Football. He was a practice squad member of the New York Jets and Carolina Panthers in 1995, but never played an official regular season game in the National Football League.

Following a series of bold statements in the spring of 2017, Ball began repeatedly making national sports headlines. His early remarks included saying that his son Lonzo was better than Stephen Curry and claiming that he himself could defeat Michael Jordan one-on-one in basketball. He was subject to both praise and criticism as he continued making similar comments, some of which involved his company, Big Baller Brand. Ball has made several appearances on national TV and has routinely drawn attention from major sports media outlets. He has also been in the spotlight for his criticism of his sons' teams, most notably the Lakers for their treatment of Lonzo, as well as for his exchange with U.S. president Donald Trump after LiAngelo was arrested in China for shoplifting.

== Early life and college basketball career ==
Ball was born on October 23, 1967, to Anderson and Maria Ball, and was brought up in South Los Angeles, California. He is considered the middle child of his family. He has four brothers, named LaFrance, LaValle, LaRenzo, and LaShon, as well as two sisters. Ball attended Canoga Park High School in Canoga Park, Los Angeles, where he was a quarterback on the football team and a forward in basketball. He stood 6 ft 4 in (1.93 m) and weighed 250 lbs (113 kg) by college. Aside from sports, Ball majored in criminal justice at college and had hopes of being a U.S. Marshal. His favorite basketball player when growing up at the time was Charles Barkley.

Ball first began playing college basketball at West Los Angeles College in the Western State Conference during the 1985–1986 season. During his freshman season, Ball grabbed a total of 316 rebounds to break the school record. In the season opener in 1986, he recorded 33 points and 18 rebounds against Porterville College. For the 1986–1987 season, he averaged 22.2 points and 12.0 rebounds. Ball then transferred to NCAA Division I Washington State and became a starting forward. In 26 games for the Cougars, however; he averaged only 2.2 points, 2.3 rebounds, and 1.0 assists per game. After one season, Ball transferred again to Cal State Los Angeles, which competed in the NCAA Division II, playing alongside three of his four brothers. During the 1989-1990 season, Ball averaged 15.8 points and 8.9 rebounds and was named to the All-CCAA first team.

=== College basketball statistics ===
Year	Team	GP	GS	MPG	FG%	3P%	FT%	RPG	APG	SPG	BPG	PPG
1985–86	West Los Angeles College	-	–	–	–	–	–	-	-	-	-	-
1986–87	West Los Angeles College	29	–	–	–	–	–	12.0	-	-	-	22.2
1987–88	Washington State	26	–	–	.404	.000	.450	2.3	1.0	.4	.1	2.2
1989–90	Cal State Los Angeles	-	–	–	–	–	–	8.9	-	-	-	15.8

== Professional football career ==
Following college, Ball was invited to a football tryout and eventually made a return to the sport. After finishing his college basketball career, he played a single year of college football at Long Beach City College as a tight end. On May 1, 1994, Ball signed with the New York Jets of the National Football League (NFL) as a defensive end.

Ball returned to the Jets on March 7, 1995, as a tight end and was then sent to the London Monarchs of the World League of American Football (WLAF) the same year. In the 1995 season for the Monarchs, Ball had zero catches, but did record 28 yards in kick returns. According to his teammate Kenny McEntyre, Ball was "garbage".

During his NFL career, Ball was also a part of the practice squads of both the Jets and Carolina Panthers, remaining with the latter team until late November 1995, albeit with no games played due to injury. His football career would come to an end after said injury, and he would retire to initially be a personal trainer in California.

== In the media ==
=== Athlete comparisons and claims ===
Although LaVar Ball initially received minimal public attention at the start of 2016, his sons gave him a media platform that he would begin to use increasingly, starting at the end of the year. In July 2015, Ball and his sons made national sports headlines when Gary Parrish of CBS Sports wrote a feature story about the Ball family. In a March 2016 interview with MaxPreps, he first began displaying his confident personality to the public. When asked who Lonzo plays like, he described his son as "Magic Johnson with a jumper." The family continued rising in popularity after SLAM magazine featured them in an article in August 2016. Subsequently, Ball himself rapidly rose in profile through a series of incredible comments about his children, such as on November 26, 2016, when in a TV interview he guaranteed that UCLA, spearheaded by Lonzo, would win the 2017 NCAA Division I Tournament. On December 14, Ball predicted that all three of his sons would be one-and-done prospects for the NBA draft by playing only one year of college basketball.

Many of Ball's eccentric claims have involved well-known basketball players. In early March 2017, he said that he viewed Lonzo as a better player than Stephen Curry, the NBA Most Valuable Player in 2015 and 2016. UCLA all-time leading scorer Don MacLean called the comments "outrageous," and many bloggers ridiculed Ball for them. Ball has also stated that he believes his eldest son is "the best player in the world," specifically comparing him with NBA MVPs LeBron James and Russell Westbrook. Kyle Boone of CBS Sports responded: "There's no way in the world Lonzo would be taking down LeBron or Westbrook in any form of basketball right now."

On March 13, 2017, Ball said in an interview with Josh Peter of USA Today: "Back in my heyday, I would kill Michael Jordan one-on-one," saying Jordan could only foul him if he did a jump hook, that Jordan could not stop him one-on-one, that Jordan was slower. Ball was widely mocked for making the statement due to having averaged only 2.2 points per game while playing basketball at Washington State. His comments comparing himself with Jordan resulted in a significant increase in media attention. Following his claim, he appeared on the ESPN show First Take, in which he argued with Stephen A. Smith about his comments on Jordan. As of March 2020, a YouTube video of the segment has received more than 6 million views. In June 2018, Ball later mentioned that he could take on Kobe Bryant one-on-one also, although he admitted that it would mainly be due to Kobe's injury that ultimately took him out of the game in 2016. In 2020 Ball said on Shannon Sharpe's "Club Shay Shay" podcast that he would play a one-on-one match against Jordan on pay-per-view for $200 million. On December 3, 2020, Bleacher Report posted a video of LaVar Ball playing Michael Jordan in a simulated first to 21, one-on-one match in NBA 2K21, the simulation showed Jordan beating Ball, 22–3, with Jordan going on a 12–0 run against Ball during the game.

=== Feud with President Donald Trump ===
On November 7, 2017, days before UCLA opened the 2017–18 season in Shanghai, China, Ball's son LiAngelo and teammates Cody Riley and Jalen Hill were arrested for shoplifting from a high-end shopping center near their team hotel in Hangzhou. The players were accused of stealing sunglasses from a Louis Vuitton store in the mall. Although LiAngelo faced a fine and three to ten years in prison if convicted, LaVar largely downplayed the situation. Upon an alleged request from U.S. President Donald Trump and his administration, who were on a 12-day visit to Asia at the time, to General Secretary of the Chinese Communist Party Xi Jinping, the UCLA players were released from custody. Trump then tweeted on November 15, "Do you think the three UCLA Basketball Players will say thank you President Trump? They were headed for 10 years in jail!" According to a timeline published by ESPN, Chinese authorities had dropped shoplifting charges against the players on November 7, 2017, five days before Trump got involved.

On November 17, LaVar Ball responded to Trump: "Who? What was he over there for? Don't tell me nothing. Everybody wants to make it seem like he helped me out." Two days later, Trump labeled Ball "very ungrateful" and stated that he "should have left them in jail" in a series of tweets. On November 20, Ball featured in a 20-minute interview with Chris Cuomo on CNN, where he continued refusing to thank Trump. In the following days, Trump reasserted his role in releasing the UCLA players, while likening Ball to a "poor man's version of Don King" and calling him an "ungrateful fool." In the midst of the exchange, UCLA suspended LiAngelo and his teammates indefinitely, after their public apology, in which they thanked Trump. The decision led to LiAngelo's withdrawal from the UCLA basketball program on December 4, following LaVar's desires. Following a March 3, 2018 ESPN report that Trump had no involvement in the incident, Ball wrote on Twitter, "Thank you for what again @realDonaldTrump ?" Ball also mentioned that if he was going to thank anyone during that ordeal, it would be towards the Chinese leader instead, as well as claimed the President was trying to ride the coattails of the Ball family at that time. Ball was described as "a master troll with an appetite for attention even bigger than" Trump, having earned more than $13 million in ad value according to Apex MG Analytics.

In the aftermath of President Trump's tweet talking about LeBron James and his interview with CNN journalist Don Lemon on August 5, 2018, Ball mentioned to reporters at TMZ that the president is a racist and that "everybody knows that. It's not a secret." He also encouraged his sons to be political in the event it's necessary for them to do so, live their lives to the fullest, be passionate at the sport of basketball, and love everyone that's nice to them. However, on February 25, 2019, when talking about the U.S.A.'s relationship with China, President Trump reaffirmed his stance on the situation with LiAngelo and the two other players, stating he conversed with CCP General Secretary Xi Jinping about the college students and that LaVar's consultant would have gone nowhere in their conversations. Ball later stated he wouldn't vote for Trump at all in the 2020 Presidential elections. After Trump lost the 2020 United States presidential election LaVar suggested Trump lost the election because of their feud.

=== Lakers coaching criticism ===
They're soft. They don't know how to coach my son. I know how to coach him, I tell him to go get the victory. Stop messing around.

— Ball on the Lakers' coaching of his eldest son.

In November 2017, Ball criticized Los Angeles Lakers head coach Luke Walton for what he thought was a wrong approach to coaching his eldest son, Lonzo. Ball mentioned that his son was focusing on getting the victory for his team in a November loss to the Phoenix Suns, before stating that the coaching is making him appear soft. Later that same month, after an overtime loss to the defending champion Golden State Warriors, Ball criticized Walton again in a post-game interview with ESPN. Ball claimed that the game should not have gone to overtime and that Lonzo's teammate, Julius Randle, should have passed the ball to his son for the potential game-winning play and that the head coach should not have called a timeout late in the fourth quarter. Starting in December, the Lakers would enforce a new rule, dubbed by employees at the Staples Center to be the "LaVar Ball Rule," to forbid media to talk with the team's family members at home games. On December 12, 2017, the Lakers' front office met with LaVar, asking him to tone down the criticisms on their head coach and help create a more positive environment for his son to prosper in. However, less than a month later while in Lithuania in January 2018, Ball noticed that even though he considers the Lakers to be a good team, he thought they were no longer playing for their coach, resulting in them having the worst record in the Western Conference at the time. This resulted in not only Luke Walton responding that the Lakers have "100% confidence" in his abilities, but also other NBA coaches like Rick Carlisle, Stan Van Gundy, Jeff Hornacek, Gregg Popovich, and Steve Kerr responding to Ball's comments as well. Other Lakers players like Kyle Kuzma also voiced their support for Luke Walton, with Lonzo saying that nothing's really going to stop his father from being who he is. On January 13, 2018, Lakers owner Jeanie Buss posted a Tweet showing her support for Walton alongside general manager Rob Pelinka, with Magic Johnson giving huge support for their head coach after their fourth straight win since Ball's latest comments after originally having a 9-game losing streak at the time. However, Ball would show some respect towards Magic Johnson and Rob Pelinka on the situation, noting they're down to Earth with him while also noting the problems with the media industry as a whole. Ball would ultimately end his quibbles with Walton on June 13, 2018, where he mentions he's a good coach that just needed to figure things out during the previous season.

== Business interests ==
=== Big Baller Brand ===
Ball is the co-founder and CEO of Big Baller Brand, a sports apparel company that he launched alongside Alan Foster's help in 2016. However, it was later reported that despite creating the company, LaVar held a minor share of the business, with his son Lonzo being majority holder within it. During his rise in March 2017, he often promoted his brand on national TV, comparing it with major shoe companies like Nike and Adidas. Soon after, Lonzo's connection to the brand while he played college basketball at UCLA raised questions about whether it broke National Collegiate Athletic Association (NCAA) rules. In mid-March, Time wrote an article describing the Ball's campaign against the NCAA rules. On April 20, George Raveling, the global basketball sports marketing director of Nike, called Ball "the worst thing to happen to basketball in the last hundred years." In response, Ball claimed that Big Baller Brand would eventually compete with Nike. In the following week, Nike, Under Armour and Adidas declined to sign an endorsement deal with Lonzo, according to Ball.

On May 4, 2017, Big Baller Brand announced its first shoes, the ZO2, which had a retail price of $495 and would be shipped later on, by as late as November 24. Shaquille O'Neal criticized Ball for overpricing the shoes, while Dick Vitale took aim at the price by citing Lonzo's performance against Kentucky at the NCAA Tournament. On Twitter, many NFL players like Golden Tate were critical of the shoe price, while Arian Foster and others showed their support. Ball answered by posting on Twitter, "If you can't afford the ZO2'S, you're NOT a BIG BALLER!" The Washington Post wrote that Ball's style of promoting of the shoe was both shameless and smart.

On September 1, 2017, Big Baller Brand announced a signature shoe for LaVar's youngest son LaMelo Ball, the Melo Ball 1 (MB1), on its website for pre-order for $395. The announcement once again stirred controversy regarding LaMelo's NCAA eligibility. NCAA spokesperson Emily James said, "Generally speaking, a college athlete or prospect paid for use of their athletics reputation or ability risks their future eligibility in that sport. This includes profiting from the sale of items bearing the young person's name. NCAA rules, however, do allow prospects to promote commercial products prior to enrollment, provided it is not for pay." LaVar expressed a general disregard for the NCAA rules, saying that the shoe would be released whether or not his son would become ineligible. After his son LiAngelo was suspended and later removed from UCLA, Ball would create his own brand of shoes for his son called the Gelo 3 on December 4, 2017. Similar to the MB1, the Gelo 3 is also set at around $395; the shoes would later be rebranded as the G3 Lux. LaVar also announced he and his wife would have signature shoes later on as well, with LaVar's shoes considered to be LaVariccis and Tina's shoes titled as "The Comeback" for her battle on regaining her health after a stroke back in 2017.

In March 2019, news came out that his eldest son Lonzo had cut ties with the Big Baller Brand's manager and co-founder Alan Foster, claiming from his financial manager, Humble Lukanga, that Foster had previously been arrested in 2002 for money laundering and fraud, as well as noting that he allegedly stole $1.5 million from within the company. Lonzo would also change his shoes that he'd wear from the usual ZO2 shoes from the Big Baller Brand to various Nike shoes instead, getting rid of his old shoes in a video promoting the boycott from within the company. LaVar later stated that he always believed in the best of people, but regrets putting trust in Foster to manage his eldest son's business affairs. He also fully supports Lonzo's decisions moving forward and looks to make things right within his family moving forward from the incident. The family also discussed about folding the business altogether after news of the situation came out to the public eye.

==== Vytautas Prienai–Birštonas ====
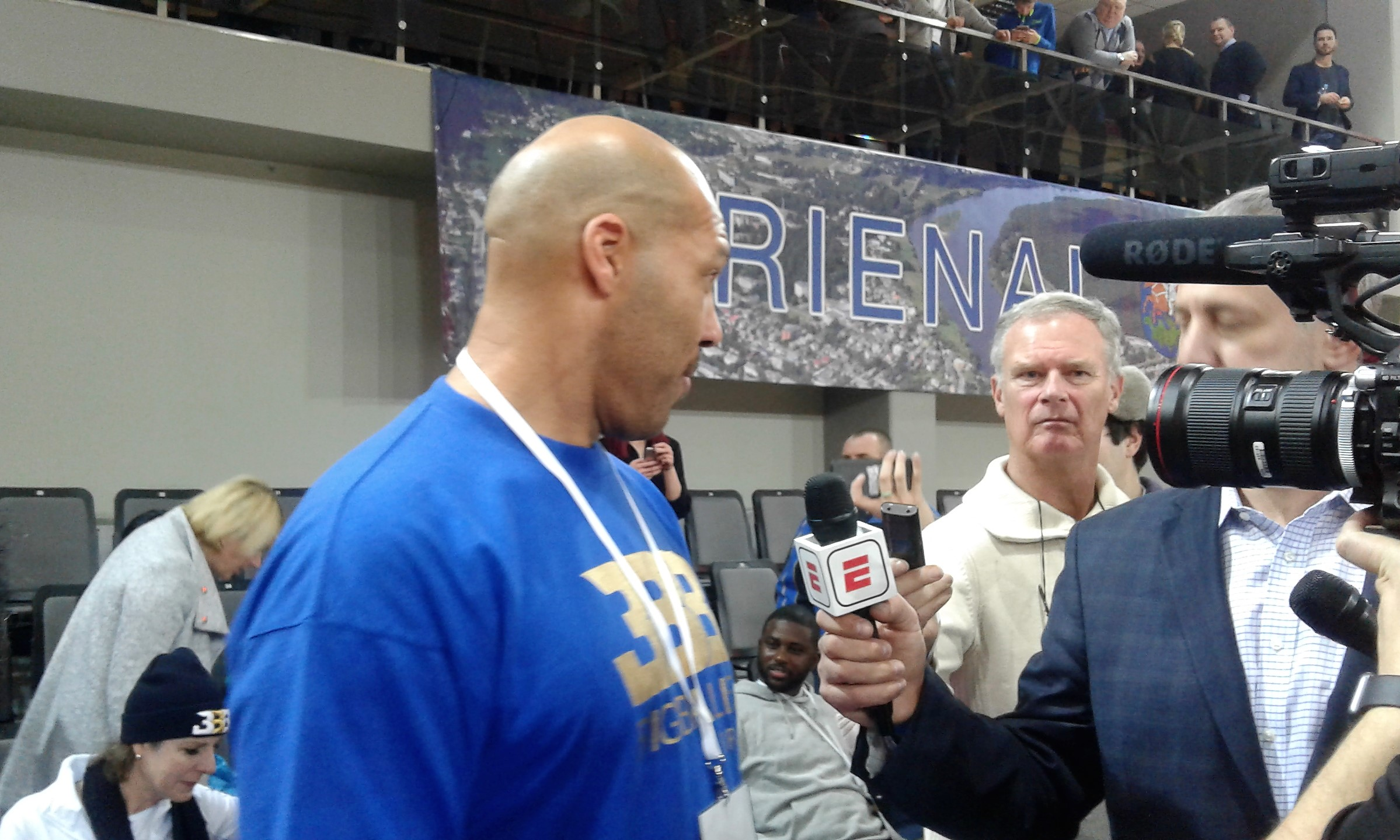
Ball (left) being interviewed by ESPN in January 2018

After his sons LaMelo and LiAngelo began playing with the Lithuanian team Vytautas Prienai–Birštonas in January 2018, Ball began multiple business endeavors involving the team and Big Baller Brand. Immediately following the Ball brothers' arrival in Lithuania, Vytautas withdrew from the Baltic Basketball League (BBL) and instead created a five-game exhibition series to showcase the Ball brothers, known as the Big Baller Brand Challenge Games. The event took place from January 9 through January 29 and games were live streamed through Facebook. The games were noted for their heavy advertisement of Big Baller Brand, with Business Insider commenting that the company was "the real star of the show." LaVar also was an assistant coach during the fourth game of the Big Baller Brand Challenge Games for the Vytautas Prienai–Birštonas on January 23, 2018, and was named head coach for the final game of the event five days later. He later coached Vytautas once again for the Big Baller Brand International Tournament, as well as a couple other exhibition games against other international teams. Shortly after the Ball brothers began playing professionally, LaVar Ball reportedly gave "a lot of money" to Vytautas to help it pay off its debts, which allowed the Big Baller Brand to officially become the team's main sponsor during the season, which was reported later on to be around 100,000 Euros. Ball also expressed his love for the nation of Lithuania, noting that everything about it is pure, starting from the people onward.

During his time spent with Vytautas, however, Ball would also disparage their head coach Virginijus Šeškus, as he had attacked Lakers coach Luke Walton during the 2017-18 NBA season. Šeškus would ultimately tune out Ball near the end of Vytautas's season, noting his own experience as a player, tuning out the negative responses behind the bench. On April 25, after a loss to Šiauliai without either one of his sons playing, Ball announced that he was pulling his younger sons off the team and would return to the US for the 2018 NBA draft. Vytautas's head coach Šeškus stated that the Ball family essentially "came for the show, not for basketball" (referring to their Facebook Live show Ball in the Family), and that it was a pity they did not understand the benefits of being on a professional team in Lithuania. LaVar would later comment that everything involved with his time out in Lithuania went exactly as planned for his two sons there. Ultimately, LaVar, his sons LiAngelo and LaMelo, and his brother LaValle expressed their thanks and gratitude to the fans of Vytautas before officially leaving. Furthermore, despite finishing their season in last place, Vytautas would remain in the LKL, although they would lose their Vytautas team sponsorship name after the end of that season, as well as no longer have the Big Baller Brand as an official sponsor for the team. Later on, in August 2018, the team issued a statement stating that LaVar and his sons were the problem throughout early 2018, claiming they didn't pay money to the Big Baller Brand's tournament winners, as well as withdrawing financial support for the team and taking back shooting machines that were presented as gifts.

=== Junior Basketball Association ===
On December 20, 2017, Ball announced that under complete funding of the Big Baller Brand, he would help set up the creation of the Junior Basketball Association (JBA). Under his planning, the league is set up as an alternative to college basketball and other alternative methods for high school players that may not want to play in the collegiate level, with 8 teams being involved in the league looking to play in major NBA venues out in places like Los Angeles, Dallas, Brooklyn, and Atlanta. The goal there is to have 80 different players participate in the league, with lower-ranked players earning $3,000 per month and higher-ranked players earning up to $10,000 per month. Its rules are set to be similar to that of the NBA with 12-minute quarters and a three-point line similar to what's seen in professional leagues like the NBA. Players would also wear merchandise from the Big Baller Brand, including shoes and branded uniforms; the Junior Basketball Association's logo is set to have a silhouette of his oldest son, Lonzo. His inspiration for creating the league came from the aftermath of LiAngelo Ball's situation in UCLA, which resulted in his removal from the school earlier in December, as a response to comments made by NCAA President Mark Emmert. On May 1, 2018, Ball announced he would look into bringing his youngest son, LaMelo, into the league to help both upstart it and regain some lost reputation to his name during his time out in Lithuania. Three days later, his youngest son was announced as a member of the Los Angeles Ballers. LiAngelo would also play with his younger brother on July 9, 2018, after being undrafted in the 2018 NBA draft and not participating properly in the 2018 NBA Summer League. During the inaugural All-Star Game on August 3, 2018, Ball coached the Western Conference's All-Star team, which included LiAngelo and LaMelo. The West team defeated East, 202–189, and LiAngelo won the All-Star Game MVP Award for the West.

=== Further basketball events ===
Due to his increased exposure, Ball put up enough clout to produce certain basketball events in recent years. In early 2018, while his sons LiAngelo and LaMelo were playing in Lithuania, LaVar created the Big Baller Brand Challenge Games and Big Baller Brand International Tournament. The Challenge Games were set up for where Vytautas would play exhibition games against other, mostly younger Lithuanian teams to showcase the nation's talent, while the International Tournament was a round robin tournament where Vytautas competed against other teams from various countries. Vytautas also set up a couple more exhibition games during the Ball brothers' time in Lithuania. After the conclusion of the 2018 JBA season, the league set up an international season to compete against other nations' young basketball teams to increase exposure from within. The event was projected to last longer into 2019, but a fight during one of the games canceled other games in the season.

== Reactions ==
Many of Ball's decisions, primarily his comments in the media, have raised significant controversy around him and his sons. He has often been subject to criticism and praise from several media outlets for various reasons. In 2017, Forbes labeled him "one of the most polarizing figures in sports today."

He has been labeled "outrageous," "wild and crazy," and a "moron." Multiple notable basketball figures including Kareem Abdul-Jabbar have said that Ball has had a negative effect on the sport to some extent. Philadelphia 76ers teammates Joel Embiid and Ben Simmons have attacked Ball on social media, while John Wall, Kenyon Martin, Jerry West, and Reggie Miller have also criticized his impact on his children. Steve Kerr also disregarded Ball, calling him 'the Kardashian of the NBA.' On the other hand, some NBA stars like DeMarcus Cousins, Dwyane Wade and Kevin Durant have shown support for Ball.

=== Allegations of discriminatory comments ===
On March 25, 2017, after Ball's November 2016 prediction that UCLA would win the NCAA championship, the team lost to Kentucky in the Sweet 16 round of the tournament, with Lonzo pulling a hamstring. Weeks after the loss, Ball said, "Realistically you can't win no championship with three white guys because the foot speed is too slow. I told Lonzo: 'One of these games you might need to go for 30 or 40 points.' It turned out that was the one game. Then once they get to the Elite 8, they're right there." He was presumably referring to his son's three white teammates Bryce Alford, T. J. Leaf, and Thomas Welsh. Lonzo downplayed the remarks, viewing them "as a joke." Brian Mazique of Forbes criticized Ball's comments as "plain racist," while David Whitley of the Orlando Sentinel called them factually correct despite being politically incorrect. Actor Michael Rapaport recorded a profanity-laced rant against Ball as well. One day after making the statement, Ball clarified by saying "I love those guys" and instead pushed blame for the loss onto his son.

=== Allegations of sexism ===
On May 17, 2017, Ball appeared on The Herd with Colin Cowherd, a show on Fox Sports, where his remarks towards female host Kristine Leahy were seen as sexist. He never faced in Leahy's direction for the whole interview, apparently trying to talk only with Colin Cowherd on the other side of the studio. Ball argued with Leahy about if Big Baller Brand should market to both men and women, asserting that his brand is not for women, and when she asked him how many shoes he had already sold, he said, "Stay in your lane." During the segment, Leahy expressed that she believed Ball was disrespecting women, and he responded by calling her a "hater" for her previous criticism of his parenting. He also commented, "She scares me. I don't look over there because I'm scared of her. I'm thinking assault right now. Leave me alone."

I asked him a question. That is my job as a reporter. And he came back at me in a very dismissive and inappropriate way. So, I had two choices: I could either sit back and take it … Or I could stand up for myself and talk to him. Still, with complete respect. And for the record, I've actually supported him being such a strong voice for his son, and we talk more about his son than anyone else because of what he's done for him.

— Kristine Leahy on her exchange with Ball on The Herd

Later that day on The Herd, Leahy issued a response about her argument with Ball, saying, "So he was upset at me for what I said there, and that's completely fine. But you can't come at me and disrespect me and not look me in the eye and threaten me. That's just not OK." Ball, however, denied threatening her. The Washington Post reacted to the exchange: "LaVar Ball officially has moved from outlandish to obnoxious." New York Post labeled Ball's remarks on the show a "sexist rant." Following the incident, Big Baller Brand began selling women's clothing on its website. It also started selling T-shirts that read "Stay in Yo Lane." The magazine Complex called Ball's choice to sell the potentially controversial shirts "his most classless move yet." Leahy responded by promoting Girls, Inc. on a Twitter post, an action that Yardbarker called "classy stuff."

Ball drew further criticism for sexism as the coach of the Big Baller Brand Amateur Athletic Union (AAU) team on July 28, 2017, at the Adidas Summer Championships in Las Vegas, after having a female referee who gave him a technical foul be replaced. After being called for the foul, Ball asked Adidas tournament organizers to replace the referee, who he had argued with on previous occasions, and then threatened to pull his team from the game if they did not comply. Adidas soon replaced the official with a male counterpart, but Ball was assessed a second technical foul later in the game, resulting in his ejection and an early end to the game. Following the incident, he said, "She's a woman who's trying to act—I get that she's trying to break into the referee thing. But just giving techs and calling fouls, that's no way to do it. I know what she trying to say: 'I gave LaVar, I gave him a tech, I'm strong.' That ain't got nothing to do with it. Just call the game." Ball also said that the referee needed to "stay in her lane" and criticized her for being "not in shape."

Days after the incident, the officiating group for the event, Court Club Elite, cut ties with Adidas. In a statement, they said, "Adidas and their leadership acted in a manner that does not parallel our views on integrity or professionalism, and neither should be compromised as they were in this situation." Adidas issued an apology, saying that removing the referee was "the wrong decision." In the fallout of the game, several media outlets and newspapers directed flak to Ball's actions. ESPN college basketball analyst Jay Bilas wrote an article in which he labeled Ball a "misogynistic buffoon unworthy of my time." Kirk Herbstreit showed his support for Bilas's comments regarding Ball. A sports column in the Chicago Tribune called him a "media-made Frankenstein unworthy of obsessive coverage."

On June 20, 2019, Ball made an appearance on ESPN's First Take to discuss the recent trade of his son Lonzo to the New Orleans Pelicans as part of the return for Anthony Davis. When host Molly Qerim asked Ball, "Can I switch gears with you because I have a question here?", Ball replied "You can switch gears with me anytime.", which was interpreted as being sexually suggestive. ESPN released a statement later that day stating that they have "no plans moving forward" to have Ball appear on any of their programs again.

=== Parenting style ===
Since rising to fame, Ball's words and actions have sparked significant debate over his parenting, which has drawn both praise and criticism. His parenting style, which has produced a wide range of opinions, has been compared to those of Richard Williams, Earl Woods, and Marv Marinovich. Although often praised for raising three high-level basketball players and for his entertaining personality, Ball has also been condemned for several reasons which included the following . The Globe and Mail has criticized LaVar for trying to "get rich off his kids' accomplishments," labeling him an "addict for attention." Ball received further disapproval after reportedly declining Lonzo's $10 million shoe contract with Nike, Adidas, and Under Armour, instead continuing with his own company Big Baller Brand. Before the 2017 NBA draft, Ball was seen as potential "baggage" that would come with selecting Lonzo, due to his frequent bold claims in the media. An unnamed NBA general manager has condemned Ball for putting too much pressure on his son Lonzo. After Lonzo was picked, New York Daily News labeled LaVar "Jerk of the Week" for making "hollow guarantees" instead of celebrating for his son. On October 3, 2017, after Ball removed his son LaMelo from Chino Hills High School to personally train him, Nancy Armour of USA Today wrote an article calling Ball the "worst sports parent ever."

== Personal life ==
Ball met his wife, Tina Slatinsky, at Cal State Los Angeles, and they married in 1997. They have three sons, Lonzo, LiAngelo, and LaMelo. Lonzo last played point guard for the Cleveland Cavaliers, LaMelo is a point guard for the Minnesota Timberwolves, and LiAngelo last played shooting guard/small forward for the Charlotte Hornets in the 2021 NBA Summer League. Both LiAngelo and LaMelo were previously signed with the Vytautas Prienai–Birštonas of the Lithuanian Basketball League from December 11, 2017, until April 25, 2018. His wife, Tina, suffered a stroke in 2017, which left her dealing with aphasia in relation to it. In June 2026, Ball revealed that Tina had filed for divorce. In a podcast, Lonzo pushed back on Ball's claims and stated that Tina was "damn near forced to leave".

After his youngest son, LaMelo, reached four years of age, Ball began training all of his sons to play basketball. They were taught many skills by their father and later played for his Amateur Athletic Union (AAU) team, Big Ballers VXT. For a relatively short period of time in their childhoods, Ball also had them play flag football, with Lonzo playing quarterback and his other sons catching passes. Following an illustrious career at Chino Hills High School in Chino Hills, California, Lonzo became a star at UCLA. Ball's younger sons played at the same high school and originally both committed to UCLA, with LiAngelo briefly attending there in 2017 before joining LaMelo out in Lithuania later that year, as well as with the Los Angeles Ballers in the JBA.

=== Reality television ===
In early July 2017, Deadline Hollywood reported that Facebook would be releasing a reality television show featuring the Ball family. It would be a part of a larger project for the social media website to enter the video business. After several weeks, it was announced that the show, called Ball in the Family, would exclusively air on Facebook on August 31, with the following episodes airing every Sunday, starting on September 10. It was produced by Bunim/Murray Productions, which also helped create the reality TV series Keeping Up with the Kardashians on E! and Real World on MTV. One impact involved with the show was that a local Lithuanian pizza shop named Tango Pizza expanded their business and revamped their menus to fit more of the American cuisine over the prior Italian specialty, including a popular special named after LaVar that's the equivalent of a meat lover's pizza. On February 15, 2018, Ball and his son Lonzo competed against each other on Lip Sync Battle, with LaVar winning the episode over his son.

=== Health issues ===
On February 19, 2025, it was revealed by TMZ that Ball had his right foot amputated due to a "serious medical issue". They reported that "he is in great spirits and doing well" following the procedure. The medical issue was later confirmed to be a foot infection triggered by diabetes and that his right leg was amputated just below the knee.
