= Big Baller Brand =

American sports apparel company

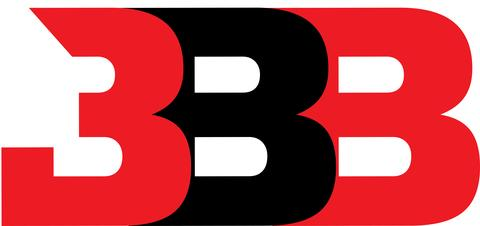
- Type: Private
- Founded: 2016; 10 years ago
- Founders: LaVar Ball; Alan Foster
- Headquarters: Chino Hills, California, U.S.
- Key people: LaVar Ball (CEO); Lonzo Ball (Majority owner); Tina Ball (Minority owner)
- Products: Footwear and apparel Bottled water
- Website: bigballerbrandinc.com

Big Baller Brand (BBB) is an American company that designs, manufactures, and sells clothing and shoes. Launched in 2016 by Alan Foster and LaVar Ball, the brand has most notably produced signature shoes for the Ball brothers—basketball players Lonzo Ball, LaMelo Ball, and LiAngelo Ball. Big Baller Brand has additionally been involved in the creation of the Junior Basketball Association (JBA), which it fully funded, and both the Big Baller Brand Challenge Games and Big Baller Brand International Tournament, which were a series of Lithuanian exhibition games hosted by BC Vytautas (featuring LaMelo and LiAngelo Ball).

== Origins and history ==
On April 14, 2016, Big Baller Brand announced that it would soft launch by June 2016. Founded by personal trainer and former football player LaVar Ball and Alan Foster, the company was built on "core family values", according to its website. Ball later said that he created Big Baller Brand, which was based in Chino Hills, California, for his three sons: Lonzo, LiAngelo, and LaMelo Ball, who all played basketball at Chino Hills High School when it was established. He also stated that each of the three Bs on the company's logo stands for one of his sons.

Upon its launch in June, Big Baller Brand initially sold T-shirts, shorts, and sweatshirts through its online store. It partnered with a local design, printing, and shipping company, Garment Decor. In 2017, it also began working with sneaker company Brandblack for assistance in its shoe design. To maintain independence from Big Baller Brand, however, Brandblack created an offshoot creative agency Santa Ana Design for the partnership. Foster, a family friend of LaVar Ball, additionally become a manager and business associate of Big Baller Brand, helping design its signature shoes.

On March 7, 2017, Big Baller Brand was registered with the United States Patent and Trademark Office, and its official slogan "Built for this" was trademarked on February 7, 2018, after being filed for in May 2017.

In March 2019, it was reported that Lonzo Ball severed ties with Foster, after concerns of his criminal past and alleged misuse of $1.5 million of Ball's personal and business accounts.

In April 2019, the Big Baller Brand website was shut down. When accessing the website, a notice that says "Thank you for visiting Big Baller Brand. Our website is under construction we will be back soon. Thank you." was shown. As of November 2019, the site's splash page directed visitors to click the BBB logo to go to a shopping page. Instead, guests who click were redirected to the official home page of Alan Foster. Big Baller Brand promised a separate web site in the near future. As of December 2020, a new version of the site appeared to be up and running. The brand opened their first store at The Shops at Chino Hills in January 2026.

== Recent developments ==
In May 2024, Big Baller Brand partnered with Global Tire Distributors to introduce a line of aftermarket automobile wheels promoted as the “first-ever celebrity wheels.” The move marked the company’s expansion into lifestyle and automotive products beyond its earlier footwear marketing line.

In February 2025, founder LaVar Ball underwent a partial leg amputation due to a medical issue but later appeared publicly with a prosthetic leg, stating he would continue involvement with the brand.

That same year, LiAngelo Ball signed a recording deal with Def Jam Recordings following the viral success of his song Tweaker which was noted by media as extending the Ball family’s overall brand presence.

As of 2025, Big Baller Brand’s activities appear focused on lifestyle and automotive products, with no new basketball footwear lines announced since 2019.

In 2024, Lonzo Ball discussed his experience wearing the original Big Baller Brand shoes during his early NBA career, describing them as “like kickball shoes” and acknowledging that he often changed pairs during games due to discomfort. He also stated that it was likely that the footwear contributed to some of his past injury issues, although he did not attribute them directly to the brand.

== Products ==
=== Sportswear ===
In May 2017, Big Baller Brand announced a November 2017 release of its first signature shoe, the ZO2 for Lonzo Ball. The base price of $495 garnered significant media attention. LaVar Ball responded on Twitter to critiques of the shoes' price: "If you can't afford the ZO2'S, you're NOT a BIG BALLER", for which he received further media criticism. In an interview with Colin Cowherd in May 2017, Ball said that if the big shoe companies like Nike, Adidas, or Under Armour want to make a deal with his Big Baller Brand, the asking price is $3 billion. He also said that Baller has sold between 400 and 520 ZO2 shoes. In another interview, Ball described the shoes as "stitching and glue", stating that they were "not that big of a deal".

On August 31, 2017, it announced the release of a signature shoe for LaMelo Ball, called the Melo Ball 1 (MB1), which was scheduled to be available in late 2017. According to Big Baller Brand, the shoe will be exceptionally light upon a request by Ball himself. The MB1 is currently priced at $395.

On December 4, 2017, Big Baller Brand revealed plans to create a signature shoe, known as the Gelo 3, for LiAngelo Ball after he left UCLA, following a shoplifting incident in China. Similar to the MB1, the Gelo 3 is also set at around $395. However, his shoes would later be renamed to the G3 Lux during his playing time in Lithuania.

The company's founder, LaVar Ball, also announced he would have signature shoes of not just his own, but a brand for his wife as well. LaVar's shoes are considered to be named "LaVariccis", while Tina Ball's signature shoes would be named "The Comeback", which was inspired by her recovery from a stroke she had in 2017.

On October 17, 2018, Big Baller Brand released a cheaper version of Lonzo's shoe, the ZO2.19, priced at $200.

=== Other products ===
After LiAngelo and LaMelo Ball signed their first professional contracts with Vytautas Prienai–Birštonas of the Lithuanian Basketball League (LKL), Big Baller Brand saw an increased presence in Lithuania in 2018. On February 9, 2018, Big Baller Brand announced its partnership with the Lithuanian bottled water company Birštonas Mineral Water, a sponsor of Vytautas. LaVar Ball stated that Big Baller Brand would import water from Lithuania to the United States with a price similar to Perrier and S.Pellegrino products. In May 2024, the brand partnered with Global Tire Distributors to release Big Baller Brand Wheels, premium aftermarket wheels for passenger cars and trucks, for sale on Discounted Wheel Warehouse.

== Sponsorships ==
On December 20, 2017, LaVar Ball announced the creation of the Junior Basketball Association (JBA), a professional league completely funded by Big Baller Brand that is designed as an alternative to college basketball for high school graduates. The league, which launched in the summer of 2018, was expected to pay players $3,000 to $10,000 per month and include teams from several major American cities. According to Ball, players will be required to exclusively wear Big Baller Brand products, with uniforms, shoes, and other apparel provided by the company. On May 4, 2018, LaVar's youngest son, LaMelo Ball, was confirmed to be one of the players entering the upstart league, while also being touted as the face of the league by his father.

On January 5, 2018, Vytautas, the first professional team of LaMelo and LiAngelo Ball, announced that it would withdraw from the Baltic Basketball League (BBL) and in its place host five exhibition games to showcase the Ball brothers, called the Big Baller Brand Challenge Games. The games, which took place from January 9 to 29 and were live streamed through Facebook, featured widespread advertisement of Big Baller Brand, with Business Insider commenting that the company was "the real star of the show". Shortly after the Ball brothers began playing professionally, LaVar Ball heavily invested in Vytautas, helping it pay off its debts and allowing Big Baller Brand to become the team's main sponsor as a result. The team was also involved with the Big Baller Brand International Tournament and a few other exhibition games involving the Chinese Basketball Association's Guangdong Southern Tigers and the British Basketball League's London Lions during the 2017–18 season, with the Big Baller Brand's founder coaching the team during those events.

On February 15, 2018, Lonzo Ball released his debut rap album, Born 2 Ball, under the Big Baller Music Group. The label was a subsidiary of the Big Baller Brand and would be run by a close friend of LaVar's.

In April 2018, after previously wearing the ZO2 shoes during a game, Jordan Crawford was the first professional basketball player not related to the Ball family to look into having a partnership with the company. Crawford also gave the company words of approval for what they are doing. A month later, rapper Quavo of Migos fame was seen promoting Lonzo Ball's Big Baller Brand merchandise on Instagram, with later reports suggesting that Quavo would be an ambassador of the Big Baller Brand.

== Customer service ==
In January 2018, Big Baller Brand was given an F grade by the Better Business Bureau, which said that Big Baller Brand "has a pattern of complaints", specifically that many customers have had to wait "weeks or even months to receive their order". Some customers alleged that they have received the wrong merchandise or even nothing at all, and that it had been difficult to contact the company. In May 2018, All-Star baseball player Adam Jones complained on social media that he just received his ZO2 Prime Remix shoes after ordering them a year earlier. A year later, Blair Looney of the Better Business Bureau stated that the Big Baller Brand still had an F grade and that "we are continuing to work with them on straightening things out."
