= LaMelo Ball =

American basketball player (born 2001)

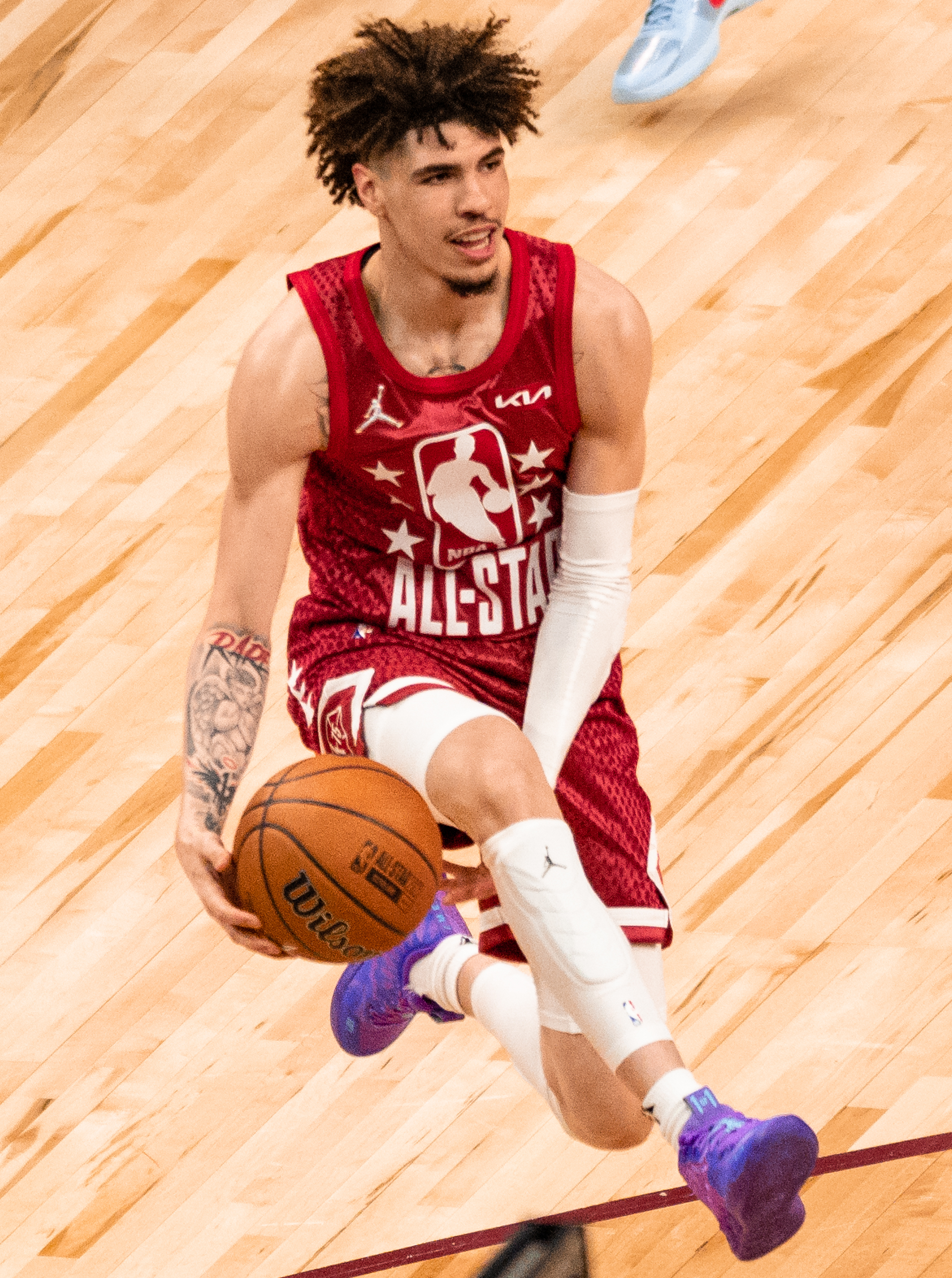
- Ball in the 2022 NBA All-Star Game

No. 1 – Minnesota Timberwolves
- Position: Point guard
- League: NBA

Personal information
- Born: August 22, 2001 (age 25) Anaheim, California, U.S.
- Listed height: 6 ft 7 in (2.01 m)
- Listed weight: 180 lb (82 kg)

Career information
- High school: Chino Hills (Chino Hills, California); SPIRE Academy (Geneva, Ohio)
- NBA draft: 2020: 1st round, 3rd overall pick
- Drafted by: Charlotte Hornets
- Playing career: 2018–present

Career history
- 2018: Prienai
- 2018: Los Angeles Ballers
- 2019–2020: Illawarra Hawks
- 2020–2026: Charlotte Hornets
- 2026–present: Minnesota Timberwolves

Career highlights
- NBA All-Star (2022); NBA Rookie of the Year (2021); NBA All-Rookie First Team (2021); NBL Rookie of the Year (2020)
- Stats at NBA.com
- Stats at Basketball Reference

LaMelo LaFrance Ball (/ləˈmɛloʊ/ lə-MEL-oh; born August 22, 2001) is an American professional basketball player for the Minnesota Timberwolves of the National Basketball Association (NBA). He was selected by the Charlotte Hornets with the third overall pick of the 2020 NBA draft. Ball was voted the NBA Rookie of the Year in 2021 and named an NBA All-Star the following season in 2022.

Ball began high school at Chino Hills High School in Chino Hills, California, where he won a state championship and achieved national success as a freshman. Before his junior season, a coaching dispute prompted him to leave Chino Hills and sign with Lithuanian professional team Prienai. In 2018, he played in the Junior Basketball Association (JBA), a league created by his father, before returning to high school as a senior with SPIRE Academy in Geneva, Ohio. Ball was a five-star recruit and committed to UCLA, but chose to forgo college basketball amid eligibility concerns and play in Australia for the Illawarra Hawks of the National Basketball League (NBL) in 2019. There, he had a meteoric rise. Previously, scouts had marked Ball as a second-round pick and potentially never playing in the NBA. However, his success led him to be selected third overall by the Hornets in the 2020 draft.

Ball and his brothers have attracted national attention since playing together in high school. His father, LaVar, also grew into a media personality in 2017. Ball has a signature shoe by his father's company, Big Baller Brand, and a role on his family's Facebook Watch reality show Ball in the Family. His older brother Lonzo Ball is a guard who last played for the Cleveland Cavaliers, while his middle brother LiAngelo Ball is a rapper signed to Def Jam Records.

== Early life ==
Ball was born in Anaheim, California, to LaVar and Tina Ball, who were both former college basketball players.

Ball was trained in basketball by his father, LaVar, as soon as he could walk. At age four, he started playing the sport with his older brothers, Lonzo and LiAngelo, facing much older opponents. He also played flag football with his brothers at age five but continued to focus on basketball. In 2013, while in seventh grade, Ball began playing with his brothers on Big Ballers VXT, a 17-and-under Amateur Athletic Union (AAU) team launched and coached by his parents. The team, which was not sponsored by a major shoe company, did not compete in top AAU circuits and instead took part in local competitions.

== High school career ==
=== Freshman season (2015–2016) ===
In his freshman season, Ball started playing basketball for Chino Hills High School in Chino Hills, California. He was teammates with his two older brothers, Lonzo and LiAngelo, and his cousin, Andre Ball. In his first game, Ball scored 27 points as a starter. On March 5, 2016, he scored 26 points in a win over Sierra Canyon School for the CIF Southern Section Open Division title. Later in the month, Ball helped his team capture the CIF Open Division state championship, recording 14 points in the title game against De La Salle High School. Chino Hills finished the season with a 35–0 record and claimed the mythical national championship. Ball averaged 16.4 points and 3.8 assists per game and shared MaxPreps National Freshman of the Year honors with his teammate, Onyeka Okongwu.

=== Sophomore season (2016–2017) ===
On December 26, 2016, Ball made national headlines for making a half-court shot two seconds into a game. On February 4, 2017, he suffered his first high school loss despite scoring a game-high 36 points, with Oak Hill Academy ending Chino Hills' 60-game win streak. In his next game, on February 7, Ball scored 92 points in a win over Los Osos High School, the second-most single-game points in California high school history. He was criticized by analysts for cherry picking, as he often waited near half court to get an open shot on his next possession instead of defending. Ball finished the season averaging 26.7 points and almost 10 assists per game, earning MaxPreps Sophomore All-American first team recognition. On July 27, he featured in an AAU game against five-star recruit Zion Williamson that was featured in national sports media.

On October 2, 2017, before his junior season, Ball left Chino Hills to be homeschooled because his father disapproved of newly appointed head coach Dennis Latimore and school administration. On December 7, he signed with agent Harrison Gaines to play professionally overseas alongside his brother LiAngelo. The decision indicated that he would not play college basketball. In the following days, Gaines offered the brothers to professional teams in various European countries and in Japan.

=== Senior season (2018–2019) ===
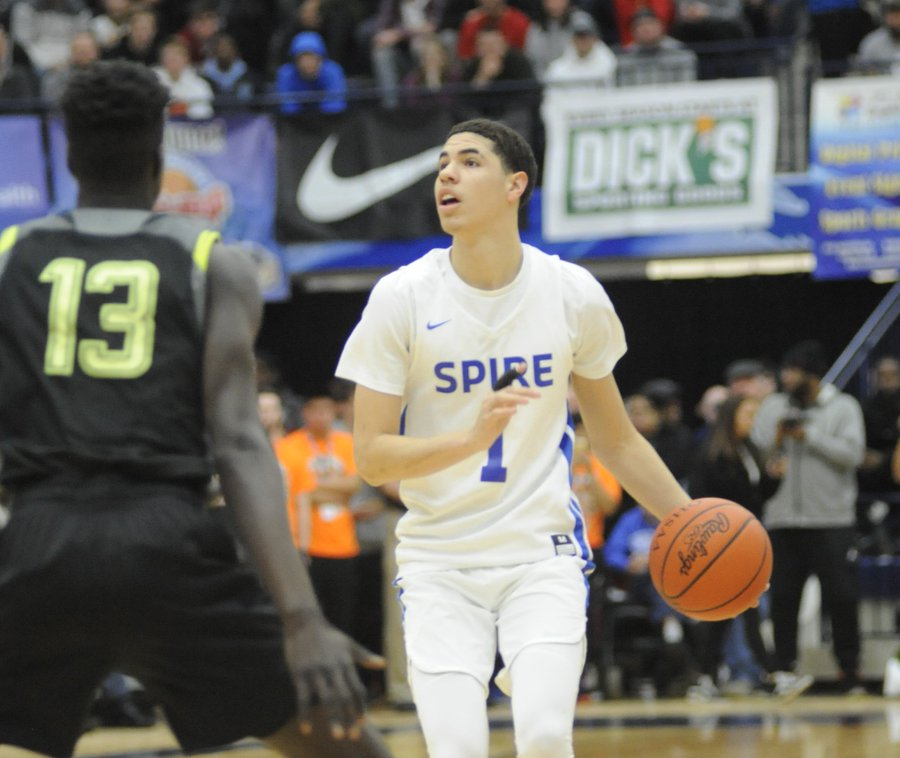
Ball with SPIRE Academy at the Flyin' to the Hoop Invitational in January 2019

On November 5, 2018, after skipping his junior year and a part of his senior year to play professionally, Ball joined SPIRE Institute and Academy, a prep school in Geneva, Ohio, where he played under head coach Jermaine Jackson. SPIRE competed outside the jurisdiction of the Ohio High School Athletic Association, allowing Ball to play without concerns over his amateur status. A number of prominent high school teams canceled their match-ups with SPIRE because Ball's professional experience would threaten their eligibility under their state federations. His team was removed from the Hoophall Classic tournament because event organizers did not meet a $10,000 request from a Ball family associate in order for Ball to play. On November 10, 2018, Ball debuted for SPIRE, recording 20 points, 13 assists and five rebounds in a 96–84 win over The Hill School. Ball helped his team reach the final and was named season MVP. He was ruled ineligible for the 2019 McDonald's All-American Game due to his professional experience.

=== Recruiting ===
Ball verbally committed to play college basketball for UCLA at age 13, before starting high school, becoming the third of his brothers to commit to the school. Ball, who was also recruited by Virginia and Washington State at the time, said that UCLA was his "dream school." He emerged as a top recruit in the 2019 class during his sophomore season in high school. Most recruiting services considered him a five-star recruit and one of the top point guards in his class. When Ball returned to high school after a professional stint in 2018, he remained a five-star recruit.

The 2017 release of Ball's Melo Ball 1 signature shoe by Big Baller Brand, his family's sports apparel company, threatened his eligibility under the National Collegiate Athletic Association (NCAA). Ball's father ignored the concerns and considered having his son skip college for that reason. Ball's signing of an agent and his professional experience further imperiled his NCAA eligibility. Despite questions surrounding his eligibility, which discouraged major NCAA Division I programs from recruiting him, he expressed interest in playing college basketball upon his return to high school in November 2018. In the following months, however, Ball explored alternative options, including prep school, the NBA G League and professional leagues in Australia and China.

College recruiting
Name	Hometown	School	Height	Weight	Commit date
LaMelo Ball; PG	Chino Hills, CA	SPIRE Academy (OH)	6 ft 6 in (1.98 m)	180 lb (82 kg)	—
LaMelo Ball; PG	Recruit ratings: Rivals: 247Sports: ESPN: (93)				
Overall recruit ranking: Rivals: — 247Sports: 26 ESPN: 21
Note: In many cases, Scout, Rivals, 247Sports, On3, and ESPN may conflict in their listings of height and weight.; In these cases, the average was taken. ESPN grades are on a 100-point scale.; Sources: "2019 Team Ranking". Rivals.

== Professional career ==
=== Prienai (2018) ===
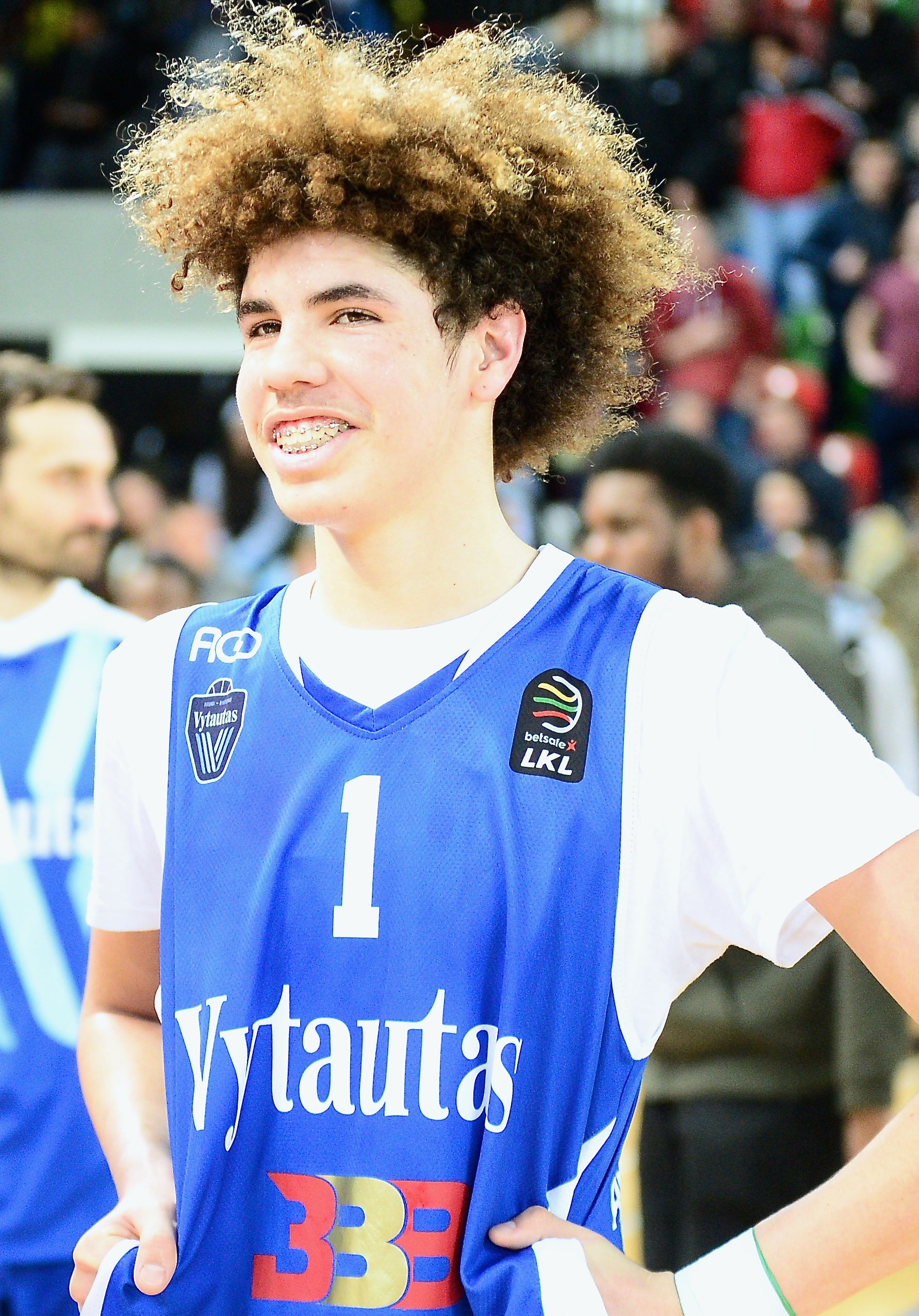
Ball with Prienai at a London exhibition game in April 2018

On December 11, 2017, Ball signed with Prienai of the Lithuanian Basketball League (LKL) with his brother, LiAngelo. Ball reportedly became the youngest American to ever sign a professional basketball contract. The brothers' move to Lithuania was heavily reported by American sports media. Prienai withdrew from the Baltic Basketball League upon their arrival and took part in various exhibition games sponsored by Big Baller Brand. On January 13, 2018, Ball made his professional debut, going scoreless in five minutes against Lietkabelis. In the same month, Ball's playstyle was criticized by head coach Virginijus Šeškus, who referred to him as a "little chipmunk". On February 4, he scored a season-high 19 points, with four three-pointers and six assists, in a loss to Žalgiris. In an exhibition game toward the end of the month, he suffered a leg injury that sidelined him for a month. On April 25, Ball left Prienai with his family, with his father criticizing coach Šeškus, in part because Ball did not receive enough playing time. He finished the LKL season averaging 6.5 points and 2.4 assists, shooting 26.8 percent from the field, in 12.8 minutes per game.

=== Los Angeles Ballers (2018) ===
On May 4, 2018, Ball signed with the Los Angeles Ballers of the Junior Basketball Association (JBA), a new league created by his father as an alternative to college basketball, and was touted by the league as its "marquee player." In his debut on June 21, he posted a triple-double of 40 points, 16 rebounds, 10 assists and three steals, shooting 15-of-40 from the field, in a 134–124 win over the New York Ballers. Over eight regular season games, Ball averaged a triple-double with 39.6 points, 14.6 rebounds and 11.5 assists per game, while being named to the All-Star Game. In the playoff semifinals versus the New York Ballers, he scored a season-high 55 points, 16 rebounds and seven assists. He led Los Angeles to a JBA championship over the Seattle Ballers. After the season, Ball was named to the league's select team, called JBA USA, which would face several European teams on an international tour. On October 1, in an exhibition game versus Dzūkija on the tour, he was ejected after slapping an opposing player in the face during a scuffle. On November 5, he left the JBA tour to return to high school in the United States for his senior season.

=== Illawarra Hawks (2019–2020) ===
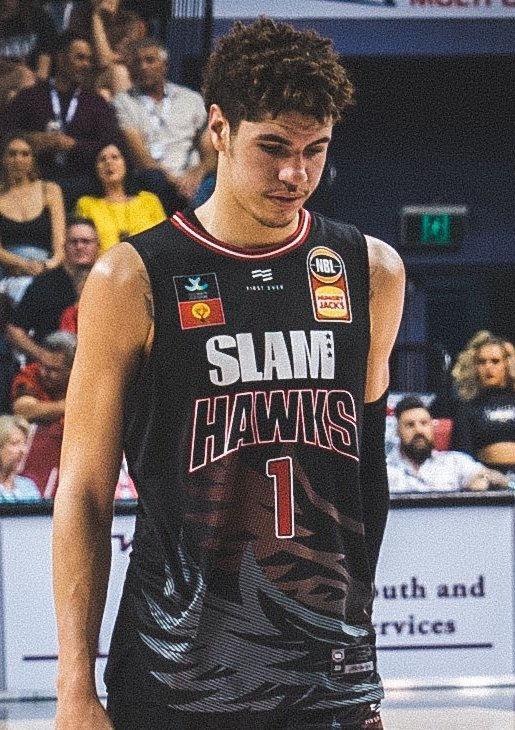
Ball with the Illawarra Hawks in October 2019

On June 17, 2019, Ball signed a two-year contract, including NBA out clauses, with the Illawarra Hawks of the Australian-based National Basketball League (NBL). He joined the Hawks through the NBL Next Stars program, which aims to develop NBA draft prospects. In August 2019, after playing for No Shnacks at the Drew League, Ball was named Leader of the New School, an award honoring the league's top rookie. For the NBL season, he moved to Australia with his former SPIRE Institute coach Jermaine Jackson, who became his manager and helped him acclimate. In late September, he had success at the NBL Blitz, a preseason tournament. He recorded 19 points, 13 rebounds and seven assists in a preseason win over the Perth Wildcats.

On October 6, in his first regular season game, Ball tallied 12 points, 10 rebounds and five assists on 6-of-17 shooting in a loss to the Brisbane Bullets. He assumed a more important role following a season-ending injury to star point guard Aaron Brooks on October 27. Ball recorded a season-high 32 points, 11 rebounds and 13 assists on November 25, in an overtime victory over the Cairns Taipans, to become the youngest NBL player to record a triple-double. In his next game, Ball posted another triple-double with 25 points, 12 rebounds and 10 assists but was held to 10-of-28 shooting in a loss to the New Zealand Breakers. He became the fourth player in league history, and the first since the NBL switched to 40-minute games in 2009, to record consecutive triple-doubles.

On December 8, before he played another game, it was announced that he would miss about four weeks of action after bruising his foot in practice. On January 16, 2020, while still sidelined, Ball decided to sit out for the remainder of the season. He parted ways with the Hawks on January 28 to return to the United States and prepare for the 2020 NBA draft. Through 12 NBL games, Ball averaged 17 points, 7.4 rebounds and 6.8 assists per game, shooting 37.7 percent from the field. At the end of the season, he was named NBL Rookie of the Year over Kouat Noi by five votes (49–44). Before playing in the NBL, Ball had been projected as a second-round pick or possibly being undrafted, solidifying himself during his time with the Hawks as projected top 3 pick and the potential first overall pick in the 2020 NBA draft.

=== Charlotte Hornets (2020–2026) ===
==== 2020–21: Rookie of the Year ====
Ball was projected as the first overall pick in the 2020 NBA draft. In the 2020 NBA draft, which was held on November 18, 2020, Ball was selected with the third overall pick by the Charlotte Hornets. He and his brother Lonzo, who was chosen No. 2 overall in the 2017 draft, became the first set of brothers to both be drafted in the top 3 of the NBA draft. After an up-and-down preseason, he began the regular season coming off the bench. Ball made his debut on December 23, 2020, going scoreless along with one rebound, three assists and two steals in 16 minutes in a 121–114 loss to the Cleveland Cavaliers.

On January 8, 2021, against the New Orleans Pelicans, Ball and Lonzo played in their first regulation game against each other at any level. Ball helped rally the Hornets from an 18-point deficit to a 118–110 win. He narrowly missed a triple-double with 12 points, 10 rebounds and nine assists. On January 9, at the age of 19 years old and 140 days, he became the youngest player in NBA history with a triple-double, putting up 22 points, 12 rebounds and 11 assists in a 113–105 win against the Atlanta Hawks, a record that would later be broken by Josh Giddey. On January 30, Ball recorded a then career-high 27 points, along with five rebounds, nine assists and four steals in a 126–114 win over the Milwaukee Bucks. For his performance in December and January, Ball was awarded with Eastern Conference Rookie of the Month after averaging 12.2 points, 6.1 assists, 5.9 rebounds and 1.4 steals over his first 21 games in the NBA. On February 1, Ball made the first start of his career in a 129–121 victory over the Miami Heat. He finished the game with 14 points, five rebounds and seven assists. On February 5, Ball recorded a then career-high 34 points, along with eight assists, four rebounds, two steals and one block in a 138–121 loss to the Utah Jazz. He also became the youngest player in franchise history to record a 30-point game. He was named Rookie of the Month again for February after averaging 20.1 points, 6.2 rebounds and 6.7 assists in 13 games. On March 21, Ball suffered a fractured bone in his right wrist in a loss against the Los Angeles Clippers and was listed as out indefinitely. On April 19, Ball was cleared to resume basketball activities. On May 1, Ball made his return from injury, putting up 11 points, seven rebounds and eight assists, in a 107–94 win against the Detroit Pistons. After the season Ball was named the 2020–21 NBA Rookie of the Year and was selected to the NBA All-Rookie First Team.

==== 2021–22: First All-Star selection ====
In the Hornets' 2021–22 season opener, Ball matched his career-high seven three-pointers, while putting up 31 points, nine rebounds and seven assists in a 123–122 win over the Indiana Pacers. On November 17, Ball put up 11 points and a career-high 14 assists in a 97–87 win over the Washington Wizards. On December 1, Ball recorded a then career-high 36 points, along with nine assists, five rebounds and three steals in a 127–125 loss to the Milwaukee Bucks. On February 2, 2022, Ball recorded a then career-high 38 points, along with nine assists and five rebounds, in a 113–107 loss to the Boston Celtics. On February 7, Ball was named to his first NBA All-Star Game as an injury replacement for Kevin Durant.

==== 2022–23: Season-ending injury ====
Ahead of the 2022–23 NBA season, Ball changed his jersey number from the number 2 to the number 1. On February 13, 2023, Ball recorded 30 points, six rebounds and a career-high-tying 15 assists in a 144–138 win over the Atlanta Hawks. He also became the first player in Hornets history to record at least 30 points, five rebounds and 15 assists in a game. On February 15, Ball had 28 points, 10 assists and a season-high 12 rebounds in a 120–110 win over the San Antonio Spurs. He became the second-youngest player in NBA history to reach 1,000 points, 1,000 rebounds and 1,000 assists in his career, behind only LeBron James. On February 27, during a 117–106 win over the Detroit Pistons, Ball suffered a non-contact right ankle injury. After the game, the Hornets announced that he had fractured his ankle and was ruled out indefinitely. On March 1, Ball successfully underwent surgery to address his injury and was ruled out for the rest of the season.

==== 2023–24: Contract extension ====
On July 6, 2023, Ball signed a five-year, $205.9 million contract extension with the Hornets. On November 5, Ball put up a triple-double with 30 points, 13 assists and 10 rebounds in a 124–118 loss to the Dallas Mavericks.

==== 2024–25: Career high in scoring ====
On October 23, 2024, in the Hornets' season-opening game, Ball put up 34 points, eight rebounds and 11 assists in a 110–105 win over the Houston Rockets. Ball also became the first player in Hornets franchise history to drop at least 30 points and 10 assists in a season-opening game. On November 23, Ball put up a career-high 50 points, five rebounds and 10 assists in a 125–119 loss to the Milwaukee Bucks. He became the third-youngest player in NBA history to score 50. Ball followed up his 50-point performance against the Bucks by scoring 44 points in his very next game against the Orlando Magic in a 95–84 loss. In 47 starts for Charlotte, Ball averaged 25.2 points, 4.9 rebounds and 7.4 assists. On March 28, 2025, the Hornets announced that Ball would miss the rest of the season to undergo two minor procedures to address ankle and wrist issues.

==== 2025–26: Play-in appearance ====
In an October 26, 2025 game against the Washington Wizards, Ball recorded a triple-double with 38 points, 13 rebounds and 13 assists, his first since November 5, 2023. On January 8, 2026, LaMelo came off the bench for the first time since his rookie season. In the game against the Indiana Pacers, he scored 33 points, with 8 rebounds and 3 steals. On January 16, Ball dropped 30 points (nine 3PM), 11 assists and 9 rebounds in an 135–117 win over the Los Angeles Lakers. On February 22, Ball recorded 37 points, a career-high ten three-pointers made, eight rebounds and seven assists without committing a turnover in a 129–112 win over the Washington Wizards, tying the Hornets single-game franchise record for made three-pointers.

Ball finished the regular season with 272 made three-pointers, second to his teammate, Kon Knueppel, who finished with 273 and led the league in three-pointers made. He and his teammate, Knueppel also became the first duo since Stephen Curry and Klay Thompson to each have 270-plus three-pointers made in a season.

On April 14, Ball scored a game-winning layup to lead the Hornets to a 127–126 win over the Miami Heat in the play-in tournament. During the game Ball grabbed Bam Adebayo's ankle, causing Adebayo to trip and injure his lower back. Ball was later given a $35,000 fine and a Flagrant 2 foul. The Hornets would later be eliminated from playoff contention with a loss to the Orlando Magic in the following play-in game.

=== Minnesota Timberwolves (2026–present) ===
On July 10, 2026, Ball, alongside Josh Green, was traded to the Minnesota Timberwolves as part of a four-team trade in which the Hornets acquired Naz Reid, Mouhamadou Gueye, the draft rights to Matteo Spagnolo and draft considerations.

On October 21, Ball made his Timberwolves debut, putting up 21 points, six assists, and two rebounds in a 131–106 win over the Miami Heat. On November 2, Ball put up 34 points with his 1,000th career three-pointer made in his 311th game, becoming the fastest player in NBA history to reach 1,000 career three-pointers and breaking the previous record of 343 games by Duncan Robinson, in a 112–100 win over the Milwaukee Bucks.

== Career statistics ==
Legend
GP	Games played	GS	Games started	MPG	Minutes per game
FG%	Field goal percentage	3P%	3-point field goal percentage	FT%	Free throw percentage
RPG	Rebounds per game	APG	Assists per game	SPG	Steals per game
BPG	Blocks per game	PPG	Points per game	**Bold**	Career high

=== NBA ===
Year	Team	GP	GS	MPG	FG%	3P%	FT%	RPG	APG	SPG	BPG	PPG
2020–21	Charlotte	51	31	28.8	**.436**	.352	.758	5.9	6.1	1.6	**.4**	15.7
2021–22	Charlotte	**75**	**75**	32.3	.429	**.389**	.872	**6.7**	7.6	1.6	**.4**	20.1
2022–23	Charlotte	36	36	**35.2**	.411	.376	.836	6.4	**8.4**	1.3	.3	23.3
2023–24	Charlotte	22	22	32.3	.433	.355	.865	5.1	8.0	**1.8**	.2	23.9
2024–25	Charlotte	47	47	32.0	.405	.339	.843	4.9	7.4	1.1	.3	**25.2**
2025–26	Charlotte	72	69	28.0	.407	.368	**.899**	4.8	7.1	1.2	.2	20.1
Career		303	280	31.0	.419	.365	.847	5.7	7.3	1.4	.3	20.8
All-Star		1	0	22.0	.636	.500	—	3.0	3.0	3.0	.0	18.0

=== NBL ===
Year	Team	GP	GS	MPG	FG%	3P%	FT%	RPG	APG	SPG	BPG	PPG
2019–20	Illawarra	12	12	31.2	.377	.250	.723	7.4	6.8	1.7	.2	17.0

=== LKL ===
Year	Team	GP	GS	MPG	FG%	3P%	FT%	RPG	APG	SPG	BPG	PPG
2017–18	Prienai	8	1	12.8	.268	.250	.737	1.1	2.4	.8	.1	6.5

=== JBA ===
Regular season

Year	Team	GP	GS	MPG	FG%	3P%	FT%	RPG	APG	SPG	BPG	PPG
2018	Los Angeles	8	8	45.9	.409	.211	.859	14.6	11.5	3.8	1.4	39.6
All-Star		1	1	36.0	.600	.308	1.000	7.0	17.0	8.0	0.0	42.0

Playoffs

Year	Team	GP	GS	MPG	FG%	3P%	FT%	RPG	APG	SPG	BPG	PPG
2018	Los Angeles	3	3	40.0	.472	.310	0.909	11.7	9.7	3.0	0.7	41.0

== Personal life ==
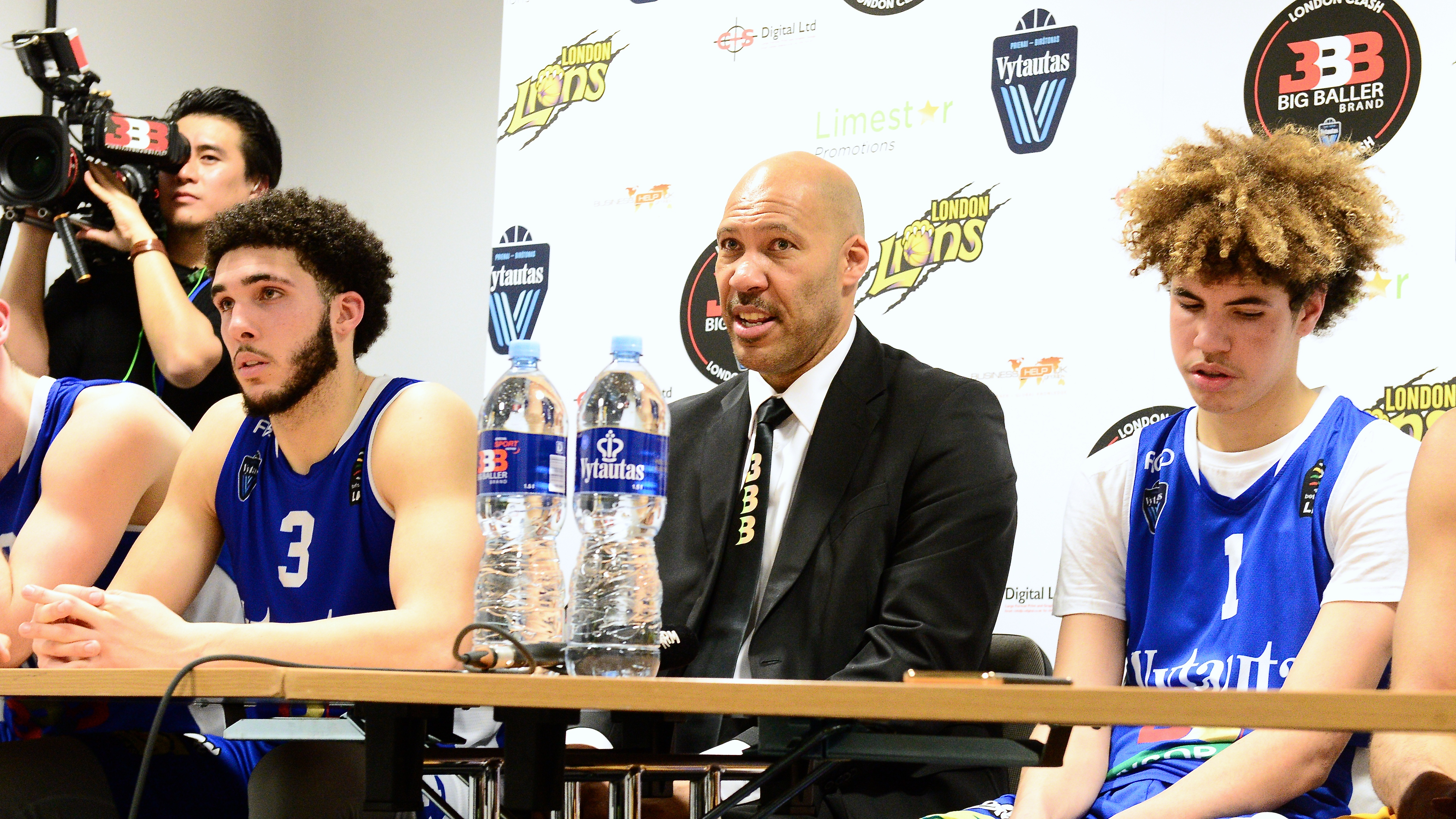
Ball (right) with his father LaVar and brother LiAngelo after playing in a London exhibition game for Prienai in April 2018

Ball is the youngest son of LaVar and Tina (née Slatinsky) Ball, who are both former college basketball players. LaVar, who stands 6 feet 6 inches (1.98 m), competed with Washington State and then Cal State Los Angeles. Tina, who stands 6 feet (1.83 m), also played with the latter school. Later on, LaVar played professional football as a tight end for the London Monarchs of the World League of American Football after being loaned from the New York Jets. In 2017, LaVar became a popular but polarizing sports media personality, primarily for making outlandish remarks about the careers of himself and his sons. Ball's cousin Andre played college basketball for Pepperdine.

Since his freshman season in high school, Ball has drawn the attention of national sports outlets and established a large social media following. By 2017, many analysts were calling him a celebrity. Ball has a role in the Facebook Watch reality show Ball in the Family, which was launched in August 2017 and documents the lives of his family members. On June 26, 2017, Ball appeared on a segment of WWE Raw with members of his family, during which he told his father, "Beat that nigga ass!" The WWE later apologized for his "inappropriate language." Ball is the subject of a rap single titled "Melo Ball 1" and released by his brother, Lonzo, on September 8, 2017.

On August 31, 2017, Big Baller Brand, a sports apparel company launched by Ball's family in 2016, released a signature shoe for him called the Melo Ball 1 (MB1). He became the youngest athlete to ever have a signature shoe.

Ball signed with Puma in 2021.

On May 21, 2024, Tamaria McRae filed a lawsuit, on behalf of her child, against Ball and the Charlotte Hornets, alleging Ball hit her son with his car while exiting the Spectrum Center after a fan event in early October 2023. The family is asking for a sum of over $25,000 in compensatory damages from both Ball and the Hornets, and the litigation remains ongoing.

In November 2024, Ball was fined $100,000 by the NBA after he used the phrase "no homo" in a post-game interview after the Hornets' 115-114 win over the Milwaukee Bucks. After issuing the fine, the NBA released a statement which described Ball's language as "offensive and derogatory".

In February 2026, Ball struck a Kia Forte with his custom camo-patterned Hummer EV truck in downtown Charlotte. No one was injured.

In May 2026, Ball announced that he had welcomed a son, LaOne Ball, with his partner Analicia "Ana Montana" Chaves in January of the same year. The couple also launched a non-profit named "I Am Fertility" to help support women navigating fertility and IVF.

== See also ==
- List of NBA single-season 3-point scoring leaders
