= KK Hrastnik =

- Leagues: Slovenian Third League
- Founded: 1950; 75 years ago
- Arena: Hrastnik Sports Hall
- Capacity: 600
- Location: Hrastnik, Slovenia
- Team colors: White, blue
- Head coach: Blaž Bergant
- Website: kk-hrastnik.si

Košarkarski klub Hrastnik (English: Hrastnik Basketball Club) is a Slovenian basketball team based in the town of Hrastnik. The club was founded in 1950. The team is competing in the Slovenian Third League. Their home arena is Hrastnik Sports Hall.
