= Jaka Brodnik =

Slovenian and Icelandic basketball player

Keflavík
- Position: Small forward
- League: Úrvalsdeild karla

Personal information
- Born: February 27, 1992 (age 34) Ljubljana, Slovenia
- Listed height: 2.03 m (6 ft 8 in)
- Listed weight: 96 kg (212 lb)

Career information
- Playing career: 2009–present

Career history
- 2009–2013: Zlatorog Laško
- 2013–2015: Union Olimpija
- 2015: Dzūkija Alytus
- 2015–2016: Norrköping Dolphins
- 2016–2017: Tajfun
- 2017–2018: Helios Suns
- 2018: ČEZ Nymburk
- 2018–2019: Þór Þorlákshöfn
- 2019–2021: Tindastóll
- 2021–present: Keflavík

Career highlights
- Icelandic Cup Finals MVP (2024); Icelandic Cup (2024); Icelandic Super Cup (2024)

Jaka Brodnik (born February 27, 1992) is a Slovenian and Icelandic professional basketball player for Keflavík of the Icelandic Úrvalsdeild karla. Standing at 2.03 m, he plays the small forward position. A naturalized Icelandic citizen, he represents the Icelandic national team in international competitions.

In 2024, he won the Icelandic Basketball Cup as a member of Keflavík as well a was named the Cup Finals MVP.

== Club career ==
In 2009 he signed first pro contract with Zlatorog Laško. In Laško he stayed four season, before on July 4, 2013, signing a 3 year contract with ABA League and Eurocup team Union Olimpija. On June 11, 2015, Olimpija and Brodnik broke contact.

On October 16, 2015, he signed 1+1 deal with Dzūkija Alytus. A month later he signed with the Swedish Norrköping Dolphins.

Brodnik signed with Þór Þorlákshöfn for the 2018–19 Úrvalsdeild karla season. In 17 regular season games he averaged 15.4 and 6.3 rebounds.

In May 2019, Brodnik signed with Úrvalsdeild karla club Tindastóll. During the 2019-20 season he averaged 15.3 points, 6.2 rebounds and 1.7 assists per game. Brodnik re-signed with the team on September 22, 2020. During the 2020-21 regular season, he averaged 14.4 and 6.0 rebounds per game while Tindastóll finished 8th in the league. During the playoffs, he averaged 18.0 and 6.7 rebounds in Tindastóll's first round loss against Keflavík.

In June 2021, Brodnik signed with Keflavík for the 2021–2022 season. He averaged 14.0 points and 5.5 rebounds for the season and signed a contract extension in May 2022. On 23 March 2024, he won the Icelandic Basketball Cup with Keflavík and was named the Cup finals MVP after scoring 22 points in the cup finals.

On 28 September 2024, he won the Icelandic Super Cup after Keflavík defeated reigning national champions Valur 98–88 in the cup final.

== National team career ==
Brodnik was granted an Icelandic citizenship in July 2025. The same month, he was selected to the preliminary squad of the Icelandic national team ahead of EuroBasket 2025. On 31 July, he was selected to the team for the Trentino Cup in Italy where Italy, Poland and Senegal would also participate.
