= Dream Team 1935 =

2012 Latvian film by Aigars Grauba

- Directed by: Aigars Grauba
- Written by: Aigars Grauba; Andrejs Ēķis
- Produced by: Andrejs Ēķis
- Starring: Jānis Āmanis; Inga Alsiņa; Vilis Daudziņš; Pēteris Gaudiņš; Intars Rešetins; Mārcis Maņjakovs; Gints Andžāns; Andris Bulis; Viktors Ellers; Artūrs Krūzkops; Mārtiņš Liepa; Mārtiņš Počs; Jānis Vimba; Artūrs Putniņš; Miķelis Žideļūns
- Cinematography: Gvido Skulte; Imants Zaķītis
- Edited by: Līga Pipare
- Music by: Uģis Prauliņš
- Production companies: Cinevilla Studio, Platforma
- Distributed by: Perry Street Advisors LLC
- Release date: 19 November 2012
- Running time: 120 minutes
- Country: Latvia
- Language: Latvian
- Budget: LVL 1.4 million

Dream Team 1935 (Latvian: Sapņu komanda 1935) is a 2012 Latvian biographical sports drama film directed by Aigars Grauba about the Latvia national basketball team which won EuroBasket 1935, the first FIBA European basketball championship.

== Plot ==
The first European Championship in basketball is about to take place in Geneva, Switzerland. The event is organized by FIBA, the newly established international basketball organization and European national teams are going to play each other for the first time. Each wants the honor of being the first European champion.

Meanwhile, in Latvia, coach Valdemārs Baumanis is convinced that he can gather the team and get them take it to Geneva. However, on his journey he quickly learns that triumph and defeat are all part of the game. Baumanis encounters many difficulties, as well as unexpected help from those closest to him. Against all odds, Baumanis's determination to persist and win is rewarded when the unknown team from Latvia ends up defeating the favored competitors and winning the title. The end scene also then describes the following fates of every member of the team.

== Cast ==
- Jānis Āmanis as Valdemārs Baumanis
- Inga Alsiņa as Elvīra Baumane
- Vilis Daudziņš as Coach Dekšenieks
- Pēteris Gaudiņš as the Sport Committee chairman
- Intars Rešetins as the bureaucrat
- Mārcis Maņjakovs as Rūdolfs Jurciņš
- Gints Andžāns as Andrejs Krisons
- Andris Bulis as Džems Raudziņš
- Viktors Ellers as Aleksejs Anufrijevs
- Artūrs Krūzkops as Herberts Gubiņš
- Mārtiņš Liepa as Mārtiņš Grundmanis
- Mārtiņš Počs as Visvaldis Melderis
- Jānis Vimba as Jānis Lidmanis
- Artūrs Putniņš as Eduards Andersons
- Miķelis Žideļūns as Edgars Rūja

== Production Location ==
Dream Team 1935 was shot in Latvia and Geneva. The film's production took about two and a half years and included 80 shooting days. The studio backlot Cinevilla was used for many of the shoots. Cinevilla covers about 80 ha and is the largest studio backlot on Northern Europe. Sound editing for the film was done in the Czech Republic.

== Other ==
Dream Team 1935 was first shown to the public in Latvia on November 19, 2012. In early 2013 Dream Team 1935 premiered as the international English language version of the film.

== See also ==
- List of basketball films
