= EuroBasket 2015 knockout stage =

2015 European basketball tournament

The knockout stage of the EuroBasket 2015 took place between 12 September and 20 September 2015. All games were played at Stade Pierre-Mauroy in Lille, France.

The top four teams of each preliminary group advanced.

== Olympic games qualification format ==
While the Eurobasket champion and the runner-up automatically qualify for the 2016 Summer Olympics, the two losers of the semifinals advanced to the Olympic qualification tournament. The four losers of the quarterfinals played two extra playoff rounds in order to determine the three remaining OQT participants: 5–8 semifinals (the winners advancing to the OQT) and a 7–8 final (the winner advanced to the OQT and the loser was eliminated).

== Qualified teams ==
| Group | Winner | Second place | Third place | Fourth place |
|---|---|---|---|---|
| A | France | Israel | Poland | Finland |
| B | Serbia | Spain | Italy | Turkey |
| C | Greece | Croatia | Slovenia | Georgia |
| D | Lithuania | Latvia | Czech Republic | Belgium |

== Bracket ==
Round of 16
12 September
France | 76
Turkey | 53
12 September
Latvia | 73
Slovenia | 66
12 September
Spain | 80
Poland | 66
12 September
Greece | 75
Belgium | 54
13 September
Serbia | 94
Finland | 81
13 September
Croatia | 59
Czech Republic | 80
13 September
Israel | 52
Italy | 82
13 September
Lithuania | 85
Georgia | 81

Quarterfinals
15 September
France | 84
Latvia | 70
15 September
Spain | 73
Greece | 71
16 September
Serbia | 89
Czech Republic | 75
16 September
Italy | 85
Lithuania (OT) | 95

Semifinals
17 September
France | 75
Spain (OT) | 80
18 September
Serbia | 64
Lithuania | 67

Final
20 September
Spain | 80
Lithuania | 63
Third place game
20 September
France | 81
Serbia | 68

Olympic qualifying bracket

The winners of the 5–8th place semifinals advanced to the qualification tournament. The 5–8th place semifinals losers played in the seventh place game to determine the last participant.

5–8th place semifinals
17 September
Greece | 97
Latvia | 90
17 September
Czech Republic | 70
Italy | 85

Seventh place game
18 September
Latvia | 70
Czech Republic | 97

All times are local (UTC+2).

== Round of 16 ==
=== Latvia v Slovenia ===
12 September 2015
12:00

Boxscore

| Latvia | 73–66 | Slovenia |
Scoring by quarter: 20–20, 22–20, 13–12, 18–14
| Pts: Strēlnieks 17; Rebs: Strēlnieks, Bērziņš 6 Asts: Strēlnieks 8 | | Pts: Dragić 17; Rebs: Prepelič 7 Asts: Prepelič 5 |

Stade Pierre-Mauroy, Lille
Attendance: 10,023
Referees: Emilio Pérez (ESP), Robert Lottermoser (GER), Emin Moğulkoç (TUR)

=== Greece v Belgium ===
12 September 2015
14:30

Boxscore

| Greece | 75–54 | Belgium |
Scoring by quarter: 16–15, 18–16, 23–11, 18–12
| Pts: Bourousis 14; Rebs: Antetokounmpo 10; Asts: Spanoulis 6 | | Pts: Gillet 14; Rebs: Hervelle 6 Asts: Van Rossom 3 |

Stade Pierre-Mauroy, Lille
Attendance: 13,672
Referees: Ilija Belošević (SRB), Benjamín Jiménez (ESP), Sergiy Zashchuk (UKR)

=== Spain v Poland ===
12 September 2015
18:30

Boxscore

| Spain | 80–66 | Poland |
Scoring by quarter: 25–20, 16–19, 14–16, 25–11
| Pts: Gasol 30; Rebs: Mirotić 8 Asts: Rodríguez 5 | | Pts: Kulig 10; Rebs: Kulig 6 Asts: Slaughter 6 |

Stade Pierre-Mauroy, Lille
Attendance: 21,302
Referees: Borys Ryzhyk (UKR), Siniša Herceg (CRO), Miloš Koljenšić (MNE)

=== France v Turkey ===
12 September 2015
21:00

Boxscore

| France | 76–53 | Turkey |
Scoring by quarter: 17–18, 19–8, 23–14, 17–13
| Pts: De Colo 15; Rebs: Lauvergne 9 Asts: De Colo 7 | | Pts: Ilyasova 14; Rebs: Ilyasova 10; Asts: Muhammed 5 |

Stade Pierre-Mauroy, Lille
Attendance: 26,135
Referees: Christos Christodoulou (GRE), Matej Boltauzer (SLO), Oļegs Latiševs (LAT)

=== Croatia v Czech Republic ===
13 September 2015
12:00

Boxscore

| Croatia | 59–80 | Czech Republic |
Scoring by quarter: 13–20, 18–28, 12–17, 16–15
| Pts: Bogdanović 12; Rebs: Hezonja 9 Asts: Ukić 5 | | Pts: Veselý 20; Rebs: Veselý 13; Asts: Satoranský 11 |

Stade Pierre-Mauroy, Lille
Attendance: 12,070
Referees: Fernando Rocha (POR), Eddie Viator (FRA), Benjamín Jiménez (ESP)

=== Serbia v Finland ===
13 September 2015
14:30

Boxscore

| Serbia | 94–81 | Finland |
Scoring by quarter: 23–24, 25–19, 23–21, 23–17
| Pts: Raduljica 27; Rebs: Bjelica 14; Asts: Teodosić 9 | | Pts: Salin 26; Rebs: Murphy 8 Asts: Koponen, Wilson 4 |

Stade Pierre-Mauroy, Lille
Attendance: 12,128
Referees: Robert Lottermoser (GER), Borys Ryzhyk (UKR), Sérgio Silva (POR)

=== Israel v Italy ===
13 September 2015
18:30

Boxscore

| Israel | 52–82 | Italy |
Scoring by quarter: 13–22, 17–18, 9–28, 13–14
| Pts: Mekel 20; Rebs: Casspi 6 Asts: three players 3 | | Pts: Gentile 27; Rebs: Melli 7 Asts: Cinciarini 5 |

Stade Pierre-Mauroy, Lille
Attendance: 14,742
Referees: Matej Boltauzer (SLO), Sreten Radović (CRO), Jurgis Laurinavičius (LTU)

=== Lithuania v Georgia ===
13 September 2015
21:00

Boxscore

| Lithuania | 85–81 | Georgia |
Scoring by quarter: 17–20, 22–20, 22–22, 24–19
| Pts: Mačiulis 34; Rebs: Mačiulis 6 Asts: Kalnietis 7 | | Pts: Pachulia 23; Rebs: Pachulia, Sanikidze 7 Asts: Tsintsadze 5 |

Stade Pierre-Mauroy, Lille
Attendance: 16,953
Referees: Luigi Lamonica (ITA), Milivoje Jovčić (SRB), Jakub Zamojski (POL)

== Quarterfinals ==
=== Spain v Greece ===
15 September 2015
18:30

Boxscore

| Spain | 73–71 | Greece |
Scoring by quarter: 14–14, 25–18, 16–25, 18–14
| Pts: Gasol 27; Rebs: Gasol 9 Asts: Rodríguez 5 | | Pts: Calathes 14; Rebs: Antetokounmpo 17; Asts: Calathes 7 |

Stade Pierre-Mauroy, Lille
Attendance: 17,864
Referees: Luigi Lamonica (ITA), Ilija Belošević (SRB), Fernando Rocha (POR)

=== France v Latvia ===
15 September 2015
21:00

Boxscore

| France | 84–70 | Latvia |
Scoring by quarter: 21–25, 19–13, 16–7, 28–25
| Pts: Parker 18; Rebs: Lombahe-Kahudi 8 Asts: Parker 6 | | Pts: Janičenoks 16; Rebs: Freimanis 8 Asts: Strēlnieks 7 |

Stade Pierre-Mauroy, Lille
Attendance: 22,076
Referees: Robert Lottermoser (GER), Milivoje Jovčić (SRB), Siniša Herceg (CRO)

=== Serbia v Czech Republic ===
16 September 2015
18:30

Boxscore

| Serbia | 89–75 | Czech Republic |
Scoring by quarter: 21–21, 24–21, 22–21, 22–12
| Pts: Erceg 20; Rebs: Bjelica 10; Asts: Teodosić 14 | | Pts: Veselý 23; Rebs: Veselý 10; Asts: Pumprla, Satoranský 4 |

Stade Pierre-Mauroy, Lille
Attendance: 8,726
Referees: Christos Christodoulou (GRE), Oļegs Latiševs (LAT), Emin Moğulkoç (TUR)

=== Italy v Lithuania ===
16 September 2015
21:00

Boxscore

| Italy | 85–95 (OT) | Lithuania |
Scoring by quarter: 20–21, 16–16, 23–23, 20–19, Overtime: 6–16
| Pts: Bargnani 21; Rebs: Gallinari 6 Asts: Cinciarini 5 | | Pts: Valančiūnas 26; Rebs: Valančiūnas 15; Asts: Kalnietis 11 |

Stade Pierre-Mauroy, Lille
Attendance: 13,173
Referees: Emilio Pérez (ESP), Sreten Radović (CRO), Miloš Koljenšić (MNE)

== Olympic qualifying playoff games ==
=== Greece v Latvia ===
17 September 2015
16:00

Boxscore

| Greece | 97–90 | Latvia |
Scoring by quarter: 17–24, 20–20, 23–17, 37–29
| Pts: Bourousis 20; Rebs: Antetokounmpo, Koufos 7 Asts: Spanoulis 4 | | Pts: Janičenoks 22; Rebs: Mejeris 6 Asts: Strēlnieks 7 |

Stade Pierre-Mauroy, Lille
Referees: Sreten Radović (CRO), Matej Boltauzer (SLO), Benjamín Jiménez (ESP)

=== Czech Republic v Italy ===
17 September 2015
18:30

Boxscore

| Czech Republic | 70–85 | Italy |
Scoring by quarter: 21–21, 16–21, 17–32, 16–11
| Pts: Veselý 26; Rebs: Veselý 12; Asts: Satoranský 6 | | Pts: Bargnani 21; Rebs: Gallinari 8 Asts: Belinelli 4 |

Stade Pierre-Mauroy, Lille
Attendance: 15,004
Referees: Robert Lottermoser (GER), Milivoje Jovčić (SRB), Eddie Viator (FRA)

=== Seventh place game ===
18 September 2015
18:30

Boxscore

| Latvia | 70–97 | Czech Republic |
Scoring by quarter: 23–28, 13–29, 9–23, 25–17
| Pts: Timma 11; Rebs: Bērziņš 8 Asts: Peiners 3 | | Pts: Veselý 24; Rebs: Veselý 6 Asts: Schilb 7 |

Stade Pierre-Mauroy, Lille
Attendance: 11,362
Referees: Ilija Belošević (SRB), Matej Boltauzer (SLO), Miloš Koljenšić (MNE)

== Semifinals ==
=== Spain v France ===
17 September 2015
21:00

Boxscore

| Spain | 80–75 (OT) | France |
Scoring by quarter: 17–20, 15–13, 16–23, 18–10, Overtime: 14–9
| Pts: Gasol 40; Rebs: Gasol 11; Asts: Llull 5 | | Pts: Batum, De Colo 14; Rebs: Gobert 13; Asts: Parker 6 |

Stade Pierre-Mauroy, Lille
Attendance: 26,922
Referees: Christos Christodoulou (GRE), Borys Ryzhyk (UKR), Fernando Rocha (POR)

=== Serbia v Lithuania ===
18 September 2015
21:00

Boxscore

| Serbia | 64–67 | Lithuania |
Scoring by quarter: 17–22, 17–13, 9–13, 21–19
| Pts: Teodosić 16; Rebs: three players 4 Asts: Bogdanović, Teodosić 3 | | Pts: Valančiūnas 15; Rebs: Kuzminskas 9 Asts: Kalnietis 9 |

Stade Pierre-Mauroy, Lille
Attendance: 20,042
Referees: Emilio Pérez (ESP), Oļegs Latiševs (LAT), Emin Moğulkoç (TUR)

== Third place game ==
20 September 2015
14:00

Boxscore

| France | 81–68 | Serbia |
Scoring by quarter: 16–16, 21–16, 21–12, 23–24
| Pts: de Colo 20; Rebs: Gobert 14; Asts: Diaw 6 | | Pts: Bogdanović 14; Rebs: Raduljica 8 Asts: Raduljica 4 |

Stade Pierre-Mauroy, Lille
Attendance: 24,092
Referees: Christos Christodoulou (GRE), Robert Lottermoser (GER), Fernando Rocha (POR)

== Final ==
20 September 2015
19:00

Boxscore

| Spain | 80–63 | Lithuania |
Scoring by quarter: 19–8, 22–25, 19–10, 20–20
| Pts: Gasol 25; Rebs: Gasol 12; Asts: Rodríguez 6 | | Pts: Kalnietis, Seibutis 13; Rebs: Valančiūnas 9 Asts: Kalnietis 5 |

Stade Pierre-Mauroy, Lille
Attendance: 27,372
Referees: Luigi Lamonica (Italy), Ilija Belošević (Serbia), Borys Ryzhyk (Ukraine)
