= Kaspars Cipruss =

Latvian basketball player (born 1982)

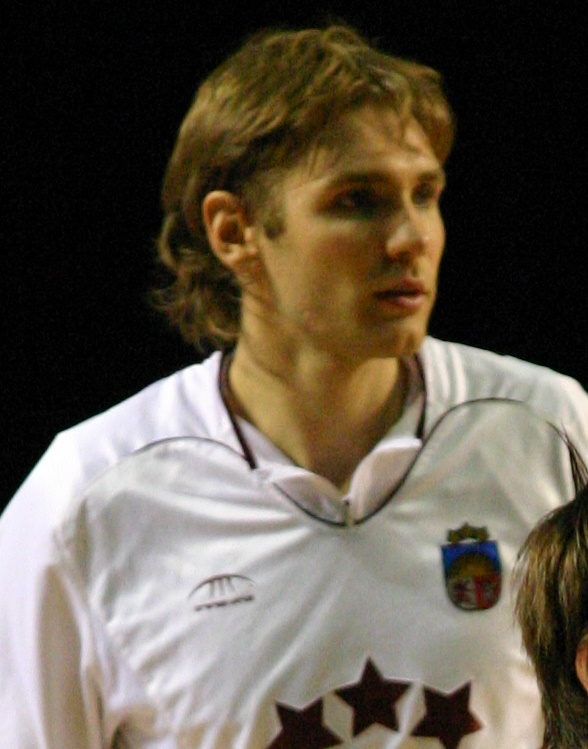
- Cipruss in 2006

Personal information
- Born: February 18, 1982 (age 44) Rēzekne, Latvia
- Listed height: 6 ft 11 in (2.11 m)
- Listed weight: 253 lb (115 kg)

Career information
- Playing career: 1998–2016, 2019–2022
- Position: Center
- Number: 4

Career history
- 1998–1999: ASK/Brocēni/LMT
- 2000: BK Gulbenes Buki
- 2000–2001: Pallacanestro Trieste
- 2001–2002: KK Union Olimpija
- 2001–2002: KD Slovan
- 2002–2003: BK Skonto
- 2003–2004: Unia Tarnow
- 2003–2004: CB Sevilla
- 2003–2004: CB Ciudad de Huelva
- 2004–2006: CB Sevilla
- 2006–2007: CB Breogán
- 2007–2008: BK Ventspils
- 2008: BK Liepājas Lauvas
- 2008–2009: BK Prostějov
- 2009: Shabab Al Ahli
- 2009–2010: BK Jelgava
- 2010: BK Valmiera
- 2010: Óbila CB
- 2010: BK Valmiera
- 2011–2012: BC Rakvere Tarvas
- 2012: BC Lietkabelis Panevėžys
- 2012–2013: BC Odesa
- 2013: BK Jēkabpils
- 2013–2014: BK Valmiera
- 2014: BC Rakvere Tarvas
- 2015: Barons/LDz
- 2015–2016: BK Gulbenes Buki
- 2016: BK Ķekava
- 2019: Pieredze (3x3 basketball)
- 2019–2020: BK Jēkabpils
- 2022: Garkalnes Runči
- 2022: BK Jēkabpils
- 2022: Garkalnes Runči
- 2022: Roug Interiors

Kaspars Cipruss (born February 2, 1982) is a Latvian former professional basketball player. He is the current General Secretary of the Latvian Basketball Association.

== Club career ==
Born in Rēzekne, Latvia, Cipruss started his basketball career in Latvian powerhouse ASK/Brocēni/LMT in 1998. After extinction of the team he had a brief spell in Latvian team BK Gulbenes Buki.

In 2000, he drew interest from Rutgers, Wake Forest, North Carolina State, Georgia Tech, UNLV and Boston College. Cipruss signed a letter of intent to play basketball at Rutgers, but he had letter-of-intent problem, so he decided instead to play professionally in Europe.

Therefore, he moved to Italy, joining Lega Basket Serie A team Pallacanestro Trieste. Soon after he signed a 3-year contract with Slovenian Euroleague team KK Union Olimpija, but was loaned to KD Slovan. Since then he has played professional basketball in Poland, various levels in Spain, United Arab Emirates, Czech Republic, Estonia and Lithuania.

On 23 January 2015, he signed with Barons/LDz of the Latvian Basketball League.

== National team ==
Cipruss started his Latvia national basketball team career with the youngest, U16 team. Few years later, in 1998 he was part of the team which managed to achieve 9th place at the FIBA Under-19 World Championship and semi-final spot in the U19 EuroBasket. Three years later he was also part of the senior team, which reached the quarterfinals of EuroBasket 2001. Later on he has also been in the final tournaments in 2005 and 2007.

== Achievements ==
- Latvijas Basketbola līga: 1997-98, 1998–99
  - Runner-up 2001-02, 2006–07

=== Individual ===
- BBL Challenge Cup MVP: 2011-12
- Estonian Basketball Championship MVP: 2011-12
