= Rihards Kuksiks =

Latvian basketball player (born 1988)

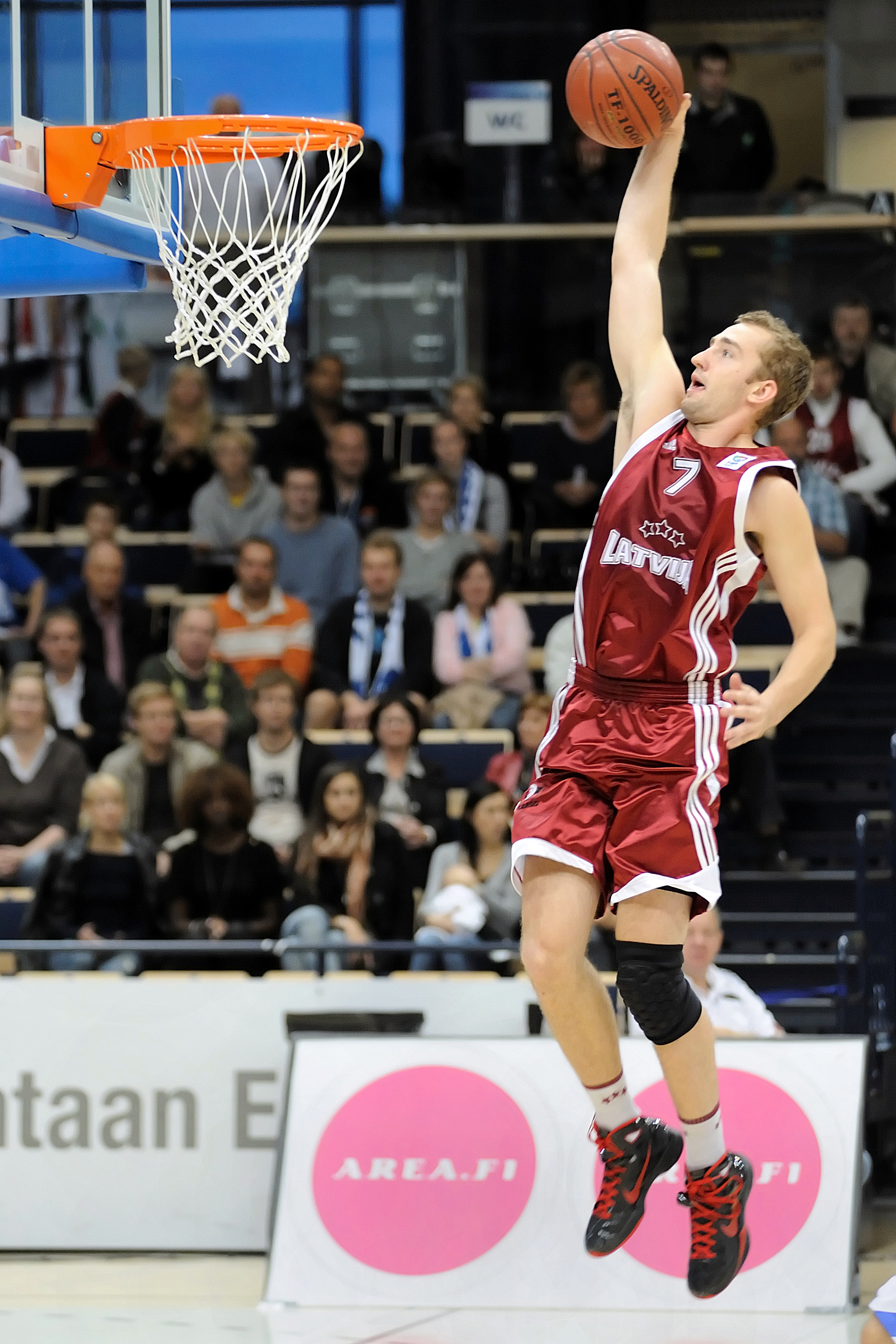

Free Agent
- Position: Small forward

Personal information
- Born: 17 July 1988 (age 38) Riga, Latvia
- Listed height: 200 cm (6 ft 7 in)
- Listed weight: 95 kg (209 lb)

Career information
- High school: Florida Air Academy (Melbourne, Florida)
- College: Arizona State (2007–2011)
- NBA draft: 2011: undrafted
- Playing career: 2011–present

Career history
- 2011–2012: Valencia
- 2012–2013: Gipuzkoa
- 2013: Budivelnyk
- 2014: VEF Rīga
- 2014–2015: Jēkabpils
- 2015: Avtodor Saratov
- 2015: Nizhny Novgorod
- 2015: Pitești
- 2015–2016: Varese
- 2016: Ventspils
- 2017: Hermine Nantes
- 2017: Nevėžis
- 2017–2018: VL Pesaro
- 2018: Super Manki
- 2018: Évreux
- 2018–2019: Ermis Agias
- 2019: Benedetto XIV Cento
- 2019: Liepājas Lauvas
- 2019–2020: Lietkabelis Panevėžys
- 2020: BK Ogre
- 2021: Rakvere Tarvas
- 2021: BK Ogre
- 2021–2022: Nevėžis Kėdainiai
- 2022–2023: Pieno žvaigždės Pasvalys
- 2023–2024: Real Betis
- 2024–2026: BK Liepāja

Career highlights
- Ukrainian League champion (2013); KMT Three–point Contest champion (2022, 2023)

Rihards Kuksiks (born 17 July 1988) is a Latvian professional basketball player who last played for Pieno žvaigždės Pasvalys of the Lithuanian Basketball League (LKL). He is also a member of the senior Latvia national basketball team.

== College career ==
=== 2007–08 season ===
In his freshman year, Kuksiks appeared in 27 games, and he averaged 5.4 points and 1.8 rebounds per game. He had double-digit scoring in six of the final 12 games of the season, including 15 points in a win at Washington, and 12 points in a big home win vs USC. He hit 21 three-pointers in the final nine games against Pac-10 teams. He also had 15 points, on 6-of-12 field goals, and had 3 three-pointers in a win over seventh-ranked Stanford, on Feb. 14.

=== 2008–09 season ===
In his sophomore year, Kuksiks established himself as a solid third option behind NBA draft picks James Harden and Jeff Pendergraph, by averaging 10.3 points in 33.1 minutes per game. That year ASU played in the NCAA Tournament.

=== 2009–10 season ===
After Harden and Pendergraph left for the NBA, Kuksiks' role in the team increased, and he finished the season leading the team in scoring, with an average of 12.1 points per game. In his junior year, Kuksiks had six 20-point games.

=== 2010–11 season ===
In his senior season, Kuksiks averaged 10.4 points per game. He finished his college basketball career at Arizona State, with 280 career three-pointers made, and he became the 34th member of ASU's 1,000-points scored club, as he finished his college career with 1,175 points.

== Professional career ==
After graduating from Arizona State, Kuksiks returned to Europe, and signed a pro contract with Valencia Basket, one of the top teams in the Spanish ACB League, which is often regarded as the best national domestic league in Europe. In October 2012, he returned to the Liga ACB, and joined Lagun Aro GBC. In the middle of the season, Kuksiks moved to the Ukrainian club BC Budivelnyk, which he helped to win the Ukrainian Super League domestic championship.

In the following season, Kuksiks returned to Latvia, where he played with VEF Rīga. In November 2014, he returned to playing on the basketball courts, after recovering from an injury, and he joined BK Jēkabpils. On January 16, 2015, he signed with Avtodor Saratov. On February 18, 2015, he left Avtodor.

He then signed with the Russian club BC Nizhny Novgorod, where he made his debut in Europe's premiere basketball league, the EuroLeague. Nizhny Novgorod finished its season in the VTB United League season, after being eliminated by CSKA Moscow, with a 3–0 sweep in the league's playoff semifinal series. On June 18, 2015, he parted ways with Nizhny.

On August 23, 2015, he signed with the Romanian team BCM U Pitești. On November 6, 2015, he left Pitești and signed with the Italian club Pallacanestro Varese, for the rest of the season. On September 24, 2016, he signed with the Latvian club BK Ventspils.

On January 4, 2017, he moved to the French club Hermine Nantes Basket, for the rest of the season. On October 19, 2017, he signed with the Lithuanian club BC Nevėžis. On November 28, 2017, he returned to Italy and signed a one-month deal with VL Pesaro, a team competing in the highest-tier level of the Italian league pyramid, the LBA. On December 20, 2017, he re-signed with Pesaro for one more month.

== National team career ==
Kuksiks was a member of the Latvian Under-16, Under-18 and Under-20 junior national teams. He has also been a member of the senior Latvian national basketball team.

In 2010, he was the leading scorer of the senior Latvian national team, averaging 13.3 points, to go along with 3.4 rebounds per game, in eight games played. In his best game against Israel, on August 8, he made seven three-pointers, which is the all-time Latvian national team record in official games. The previous record was six three-pointers made in one game, held by four different players (Martiņš Laksa, Sandis Valters, Uvis Helmanis and Ainars Bagatskis).

At the EuroBasket 2011, he was also the team's leading scorer, averaging 16 points a game. In the summer of 2012, he helped Latvia to qualify for the EuroBasket 2013, scoring 12.1 points per game.
