= Vecvagars =

Origin
- Origin: Latvian
- Meaning: "old overseer"

Vecvagars (feminine: Vecvagare) is a Latvian occupational surname, derived from the Latvian words vecs ("old)" and vagars ("overseer"). Individuals with the surname include:

- Arnis Vecvagars (born 1974), Latvian retired basketball player and current manager of Latvian national basketball team;
- Kaspars Vecvagars (born 1993), Latvian basketball player
