= Valdemārs Baumanis =

Latvian basketball player and coach

Personal information
- Born: 19 April 1905 Liepāja, Russian Empire
- Died: 24 April 1992 (aged 87) Chicago, Illinois, United States
- Coaching career: 1931–1950s

Career history

Coaching
- 1931-1940; 1942-1943: Rīgas ASK
- 1948-1954: CEP Lorient

Valdemārs Kristaps Baumanis (19 April 1905 – 24 April 1992) was a Latvian basketball player, basketball and football coach.

He was head coach of Latvia national basketball team in EuroBasket 1935 and EuroBasket 1939. In 1935, Latvia won the tournament, becoming the first ever European champions. In 1939, Latvia won silver medals. The 2012 Latvian film Dream Team 1935 is based on the events of the EuroBasket 1935. It tells the story of the Latvian national basketball team, the winners of the tournament.

== Biography ==
=== Early life and military career ===
Valdemārs Baumanis was born in Liepāja 19 April 1905. After the First World War, he travelled to Riga where he graduated Riga City gymnasium No.4. He started to play basketball in 1922 while still at school. From 1925 until 1927, Baumanis studied economics at the University of Latvia. In 1927, he was drafted into Latvian Army where he served in the 6th Riga infantry regiment. In the same year, he also was accepted into Latvian military academy which he graduated in 1929 with the rank of lieutenant

During Second World War in 1943 Baumanis as an officer of Latvian army was conscripted into Latvian Legion. He served in general staff of the Legion. Later he was deployed to staff of the 15th Waffen Grenadier Division of the SS. In 1944, he was promoted to the rank of captain and became commander of the divisions supply battalion. In March 1945 he was promoted to the rank of major and became commander of the all supply units of the 15th Waffen Grenadier Division.

At the last days of the war, he led around 4000 Latvian soldiers to the Western Allies thus saving them from Soviet Red army and further repressions. He was held captive in a POW camp in Putloss, Germany. After release he lived in Germany until 1947 when he traveled to France and lived in Lorient until 1956. In 1956, he travelled to the United States and for the rest of the life lived in Chicago.

=== Playing career ===
From 1923 until 1930, Baumanis played basketball for the JKS team (Latvian Christian Youth) and became two-time Latvian champion (1925 & 1929). He has played six games for Latvian national basketball team including the national team's first international game against Estonia in 1924.

=== Coaching career ===
He started his coaching career in 1931 when after injury he was forced to leave the JKS team. From 1931 until 1940, Baumanis was a head coach of the army team Rīgas ASK. He became three time Latvian champion with Rīgas ASK (1932; 1939–1940). During Nazi occupation of Latvia, he returned as the head coach of the Rīgas ASK and became Latvian champions for another two times (1942–1943). In 1942-43, season he also coached Rīgas ASK women basketball team.

Also, he was appointed as the head coach of the Latvian national basketball team for four years (1935, 1938-1940). In 1935 Latvia won the tournament and became the first European champions but in 1939, Latvia lost in the final and thus won silver medals. Baumanis was also first Latvian basketball referee with FIBA category and in 1936, he was one of the referees of Olympic basketball tournament in Berlin. Also he was a board member of the Latvia Basketball Association for many years. In 1939, Baumanis attended summer school for basketball coaches in Long Island, United States.

In 1945, Baumanis left to Germany and an after the Second World War was an active promoter of sports in Latvian exile community. In 1946, he established a football team out of former Latvian football players in Germany and this team played several matches against German football clubs. From 1946 until 1947, he coached basketball team Riga in Lübeck which consisted mainly of Latvians. In the years 1948–1954, he moved to France and served as the head coach of the French basketball team CEP Lorient.

Since 1956, he lived in Chicago where he actively organized sport and basketball events for Latvian community in the US. He led the sport department of the American Latvian Association and coached the basketball team of the Latvian military veteran organisation Hawks of Daugava which became champions of Latvian community in US for several years.

Baumanis died in Chicago on 24 April 1992.

== See also ==
- List of FIBA EuroBasket winning head coaches
