= Latvia men's national basketball team =

Men's national basketball team representing Latvia

Latvia
- FIBA ranking: 12 (1 September 2026)
- Joined FIBA: 1932 (co-founders)
- FIBA zone: FIBA Europe
- National federation: LBS
- Coach: Jānis Gailītis

Olympic Games
- Appearances: 1
- Medals: None

FIBA World Cup
- Appearances: 1
- Medals: None

EuroBasket
- Appearances: 15
- Medals: (gold) Gold: (1935); (silver) Silver: (1939)
Home	Away

First international
- Latvia 20–16 Estonia (Riga, Latvia; 29 April 1924)

Biggest win
- Latvia 108–7 Finland ^{‡} (Kaunas, Lithuania; 24 May 1939)

Biggest defeat
- Lithuania 108–65 Latvia (Kaunas, Lithuania; 17 November 1993)

The Latvia men's national basketball team (Latvian: Latvijas basketbola izlase) represents Latvia in international basketball. They are organized and run by the Latvian Basketball Association. Latvia has reached the European Basketball Championship 15 times, with their ultimate success occurring during the inter-war period, when they became the first team to win the tournament in 1935. Four years later, they had another impressive run to come away with the silver in 1939. Although after 1939, Latvia were forced to suspend their national team operations, due to the Occupation of the Baltic states. Latvia regained independence in 1991, with their national team taking part in international competition once again a year later.

== History ==
=== Origins of the team ===
On 26 November 1923, the Latvijas Basketbola Savienība was founded, earlier than most basketball federations from other countries.

On 29 April 1924, Latvia played their first international game versus Estonia, winning it 20–16.

In the winter of 1924, the first men's basketball championship was held, while the first women's championship was organized in 1933.

Latvians, like their Baltic neighbors Lithuanians and Estonians, also began playing basketball in the 1920s, quickly rising as the strongest of the Baltic teams. On 13 December 1925 in Riga, when the Lithuanian national team played their first international game. Latvia easily swept them with the score of 41–20. Later on, Latvia continued to dominate the future three-times European champions as well (41–29 and 123–10). In fact, Latvia had one of the world's strongest national basketball teams. The first Latvian teams consisted of students and pupils, who were trained by coaches of the American YMCA (Young Men's Christian Association).

Latvia also was one of the eight countries which signed the founding act of FIBA on 18 June 1932 in Geneva, along with Switzerland, Czechoslovakia, Greece, Italy, Portugal, Romania and Argentina. The Latvian representative in this event was Jāzeps Šadeiko.

=== EuroBasket 1935 ===
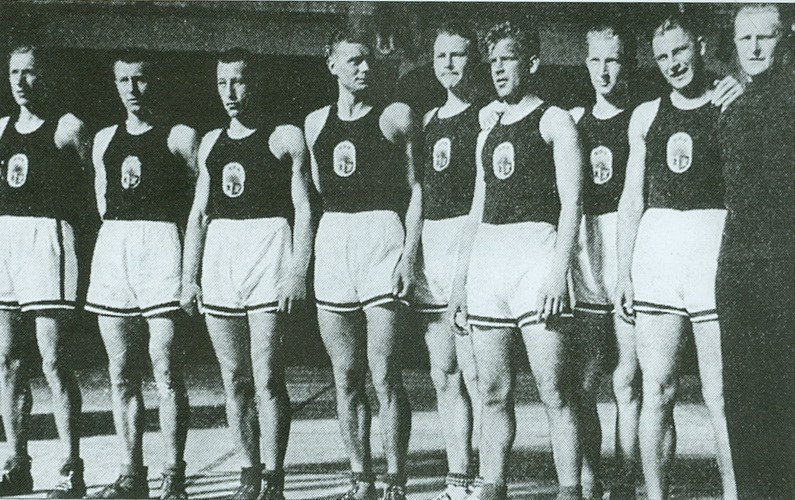
The Latvian national team at EuroBasket 1935.

The Latvians won the first European basketball championship, the EuroBasket 1935 held by the International Basketball Federation's FIBA Europe continental federation. They defeated Hungary in the preliminary round, Switzerland in the semi-finals, and Spain in the final to finish at the top of the ten-nation field.

Latvia held their opponents to 49 points over three games, the lowest points-against average in the tournament. Their scoring rate, 98 points over three games for 32.67 points per game, was second only to France.

Latvia is the smallest country in population to ever win the EuroBasket.

In 2012, Latvian film director Aigars Grauba directed the historical sports drama Dream Team 1935 about the journey of the Latvian team towards winning the title.

=== 1936 Summer Olympic Games (Berlin 1936) ===
The Latvia national basketball team participated in the first appearance of basketball as an official Olympic medal event. Latvia were reigning European champions and were considered to be one of the pre-tournament favorites. Although the Olympics did not go that well for the Latvians. They began the tournament with a 20–17 victory over Uruguay. However, they were soundly beaten 23–34 by Canada and after suffering another defeat to Poland 23–28, the Latvians did not qualify for the knockout stage, unlike their neighbors Estonia. This was the first and only appearance for Latvia at the Olympic Games as of 2025 (their female counterparts made their first appearance in 2008).

=== EuroBasket 1937 ===
At the EuroBasket 1937, the reigning champions got off to a great start in their first game in the tournament by blowing out Czechoslovakia 44–11. In their second game they lost a close one to Poland to drop to (1–1) in the standings. They finished up group play with a needed win against France to put them in a three-way tie for the lead of the four-team group. However, it wouldn't be enough for the national team to reach the semi-finals as they came out on the bottom of the tie-breaker against Poland and France. This result came about despite the Latvians being the highest-scoring team in the entire tournament and allowing fewer opponent points than any of the other teams in their group.

Being in the bottom half of the preliminary group meant that the team could finish no better than fifth. In the classification semifinal, Latvia faced Egypt, which had withdrawn after their first two preliminary matches. They advanced to the 5th/6th place playoff, which they lost to Estonia 41–19.

=== EuroBasket 1939 ===
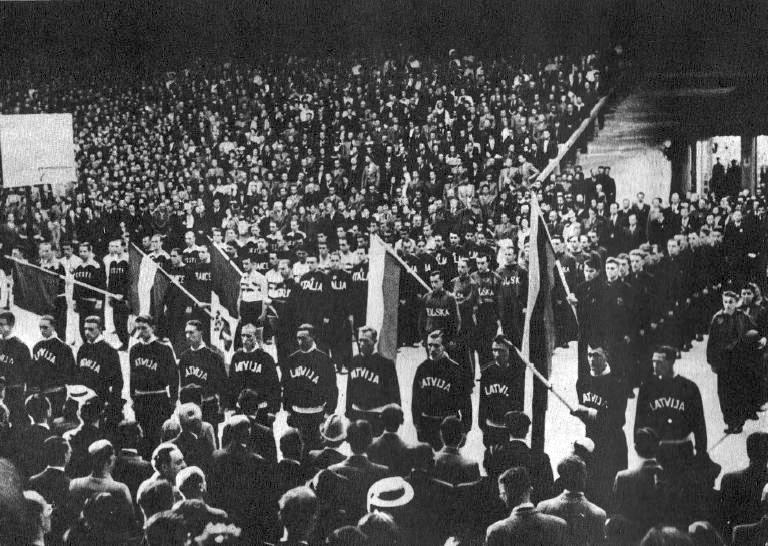
Latvia national team during opening ceremony of EuroBasket 1939

In 1939, despite losing twice, including a rematch of the 1937 game against Estonia, Latvia secured silver medals with 5 wins. Poland, which also had a 5–2 record, finished third as Latvia had won the match between the two teams. The tournament's opening and, in retrospect, decisive game between Latvia and Lithuania ended in a dramatic late victory for the hosts and eventual champions Lithuania, souring the sports relations between the two countries and leading to the cancellation of the 1939 Baltic Cup.

One of the 1939's vice-champions, Alfrēds Krauklis, once said: "Frankly saying – these three Baltic states raised the European basketball. Now they say that its Spanish, and so what? Let them say... And I say – it's our merit!".

=== Soviet and Nazi period (1940–1991) ===
Due to Soviet and Nazi occupations, Latvians were unable to represent Latvia in FIBA organized tournaments or the Olympic Games. Instead, they were forced to play for the Soviet Union national team.

Horrific times in Latvia began. In 1940 the massive people deportations started, implemented by the Soviets. Thousands of Latvians were forced to leave their homeland, thousands of them died due to the active warfare during World War II.

Though, despite all the cruel challenges, basketball was continued to be played and retained its popularity in Latvia. In 1941 a Baltic States tournament was organized in Kaunas Sports Hall. The Lithuanian SSR team won the final against the Latvian SSR, 38–33.

At the 1952 Summer Olympics, Maigonis Valdmanis became the first Latvian representative on the Soviet squad, which won the Olympic silver medals that year. A few years later two other Latvian basketball stars joined the team: Jānis Krūmiņš and Valdis Muižnieks. Later on, the trio won two EuroBasket titles and two times became Olympic vice-champions together.

In the 1950s, Rīgas ASK, coached by the Soviet legend Aleksandr Gomelsky, became the major force of the Soviet Union and even Europe by winning three consecutive European Cup titles from 1958 to 1960. The club's roster had multiple European champions in Jānis Krūmiņš, Maigonis Valdmanis and Valdis Muižnieks. Furthermore, in 1960 TTT Riga won the European Cup for Women's Clubs, undoubtedly turning Riga into the capital of basketball with the two major European basketball titles held by the single city's clubs at the same time. And it only was the first of the stunning 18 European titles.

In later years other Latvian basketball stars appeared, such as Valdis Valters and Igors Miglinieks, the latter of whom was eventually crowned as Olympic champion. Valdis Valters is considered to be one of Europe's greatest basketball players of the 1980s. He won the World Cup in 1982 and became the European champion twice, being named as the MVP of EuroBasket 1981.

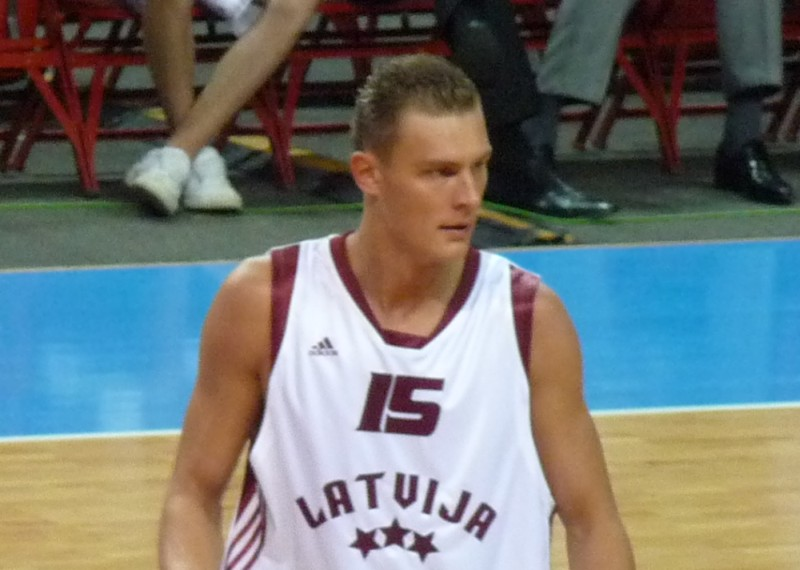
Andris Biedriņš representing Team Latvia at the EuroBasket 2009

=== After the restoration of independence (from 1991) ===
On 4 May 1990 Latvia declared the country's independence from the Soviet Union. Consequently, in September 1991 its basketball federation was re-affiliated with FIBA. Though, despite having some remarkable players like Valdis Valters, Igors Miglinieks, Ainars Bagatskis, Kaspars Kambala, Andris Biedriņš, Latvia failed to recover its inter-war glory. Their best result after restoring the country's independence is the 5th place achieved at the 2023 World Cup. Although, basketball is slowly regaining its power in Latvia with the help of the medals-winning youth squads.

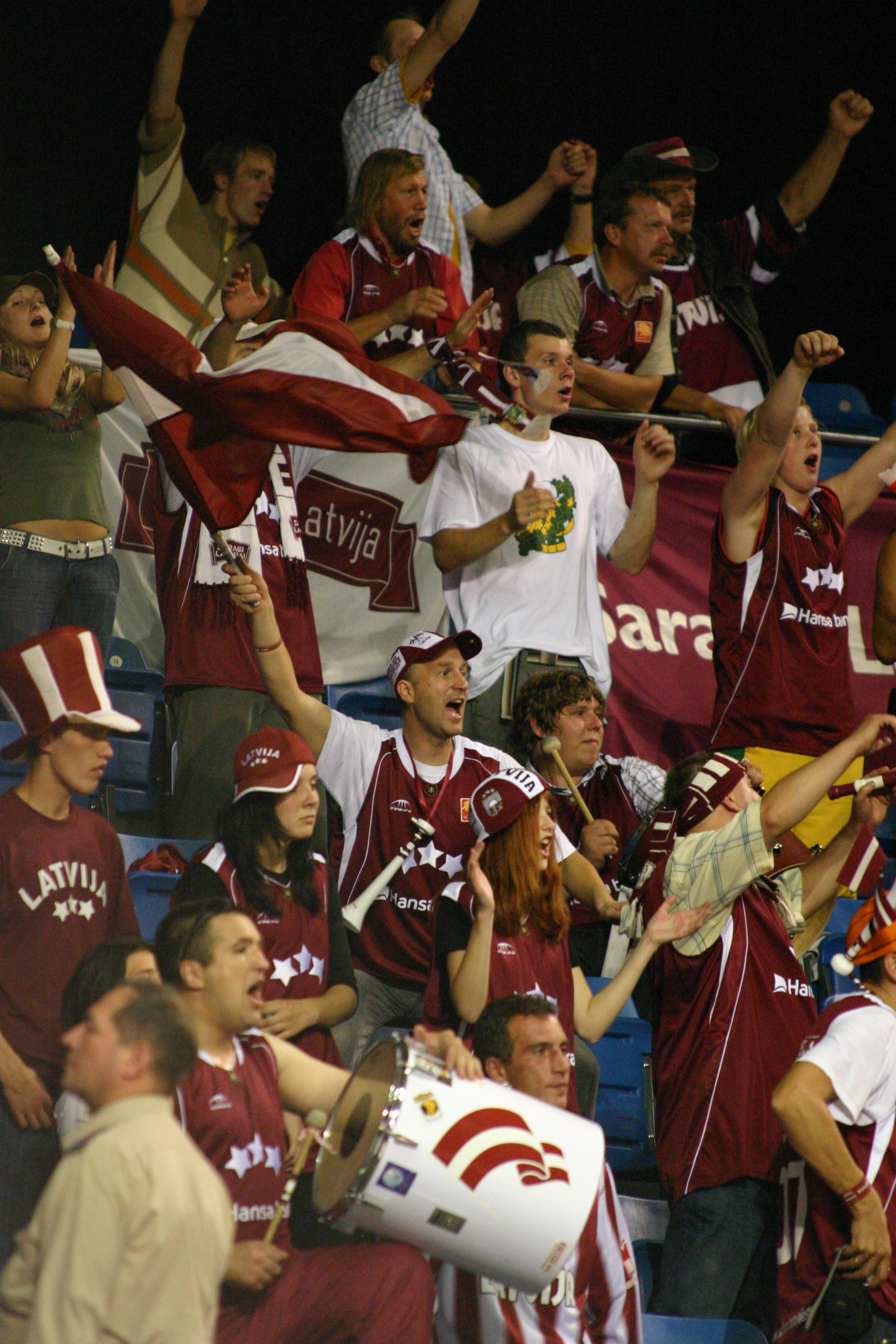
Latvia basketball fans

=== EuroBasket 2013 ===
During EuroBasket 2013, Latvia began their tournament run with two wins against Bosnia and Herzegovina, and Montenegro before facing longtime Baltic rival Lithuania. Although in the highly anticipated match between the two nations, Lithuania prevailed 67–59. Latvia then lost their next match versus Serbia, but rebounded to win their final fixture in group play against Macedonia to advance.

In the second group phase of the tournament Latvia displayed immediate dominance in their first game of group play over Ukraine winning 86–51. It turned out to be the only win Latvia would record in the group, as they were eventually eliminated.

=== EuroBasket 2015 ===
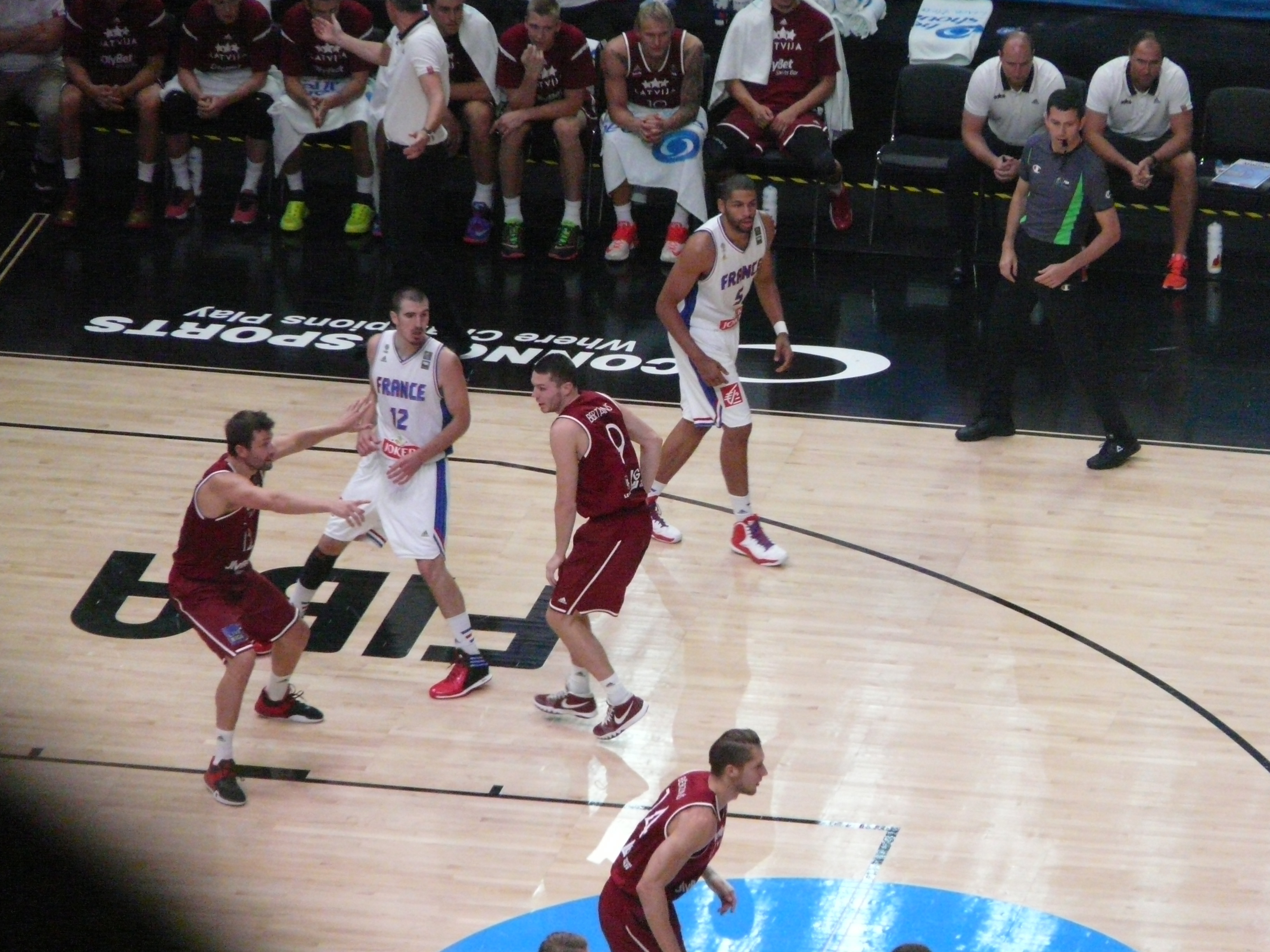
France v Latvia quarter-finals match at EuroBasket 2015

As one of the hosts for EuroBasket 2015 in Riga, Latvia began their campaign at the tournament victorious over Belgium 78–67. In their second match, they were once again pitted against their rivals Lithuania. Latvia looked to avenge their lost from the prior EuroBasket showdown between the two, as the national team got off to a strong start in the 1st quarter. Unfortunately, the Latvians were unable to maintain the momentum they started the match with, as they fell to their rivals again, 68–49. While it was demoralizing for Latvia to be defeated in that manner in front of their home crowd, they recovered quickly to win two out of the next three matches they played to move on to the knockout stage. There, Latvia beat Slovenia to advance to the quarter-finals, but ultimately fell short to the eventual bronze medalist France.

=== EuroBasket 2017 ===
At EuroBasket 2017, Latvia entered the competition with high expectations, as they fielded one of their most potent lineups ever. With the addition of Latvian star Kristaps Porziņģis joining the senior national team for the first time, Latvia was poised to go on a long tournament run. But in their first match they were out lasted by a veteran Serbian squad, 92–82. Although, the national team bounced back in a huge way dismantling Belgium 92–64, with Porziņģis and Jānis Timma leading the way in scoring with 27 points apiece. They also went on to win their next three matches in group play to finish with a (4–1) record, to earn a spot in the knockout rounds. In their round of 16 match up, they throttled Montenegro 100–68. Latvia ran into a buzz saw in their quarter-finals match though, falling to the eventual champions Slovenia.

Latvia finished fifth in the tournament overall, reaching their best post-war result in the history of the national team, in which Kristaps Porziņģis debuted with astonishing averages of 23.6 points, 5.9 rebounds and 1.9 blocks at the age of 22.

=== Recent years (2019–2022) ===
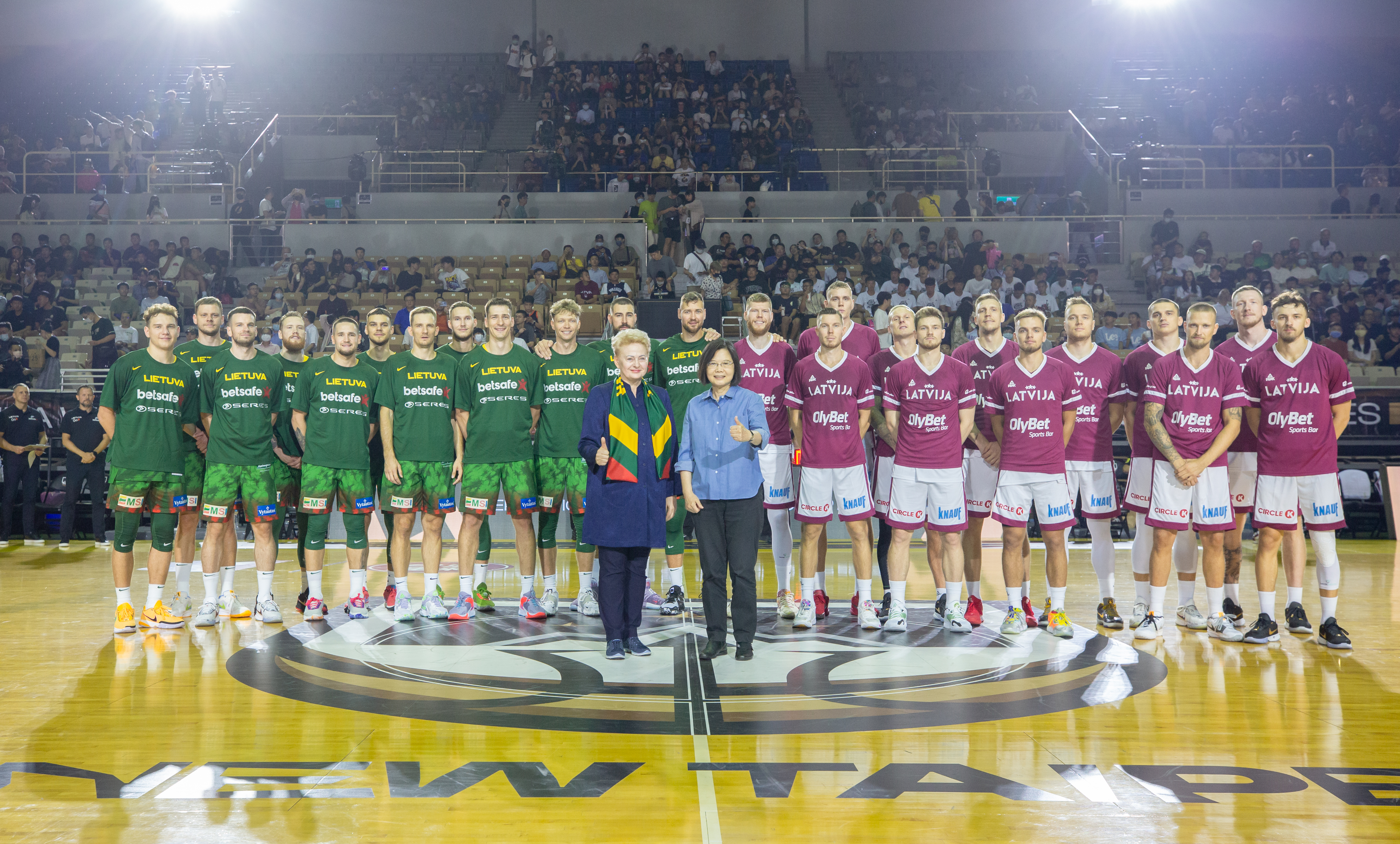
Latvia national team before a friendly versus Lithuania in 2023

On 1 August 2019, Latvia named former player Roberts Štelmahers the new head coach of the national team. He replaced Arnis Vecvagars, who failed to qualify for the 2019 FIBA Basketball World Cup. Štelmahers also had a brief stint, as he resigned after Latvia failed to qualify for the EuroBasket 2022. In March 2022, Latvia was selected as one of the four co-hosts for EuroBasket 2025, where they will host one preliminary phase group, as well as the knockout rounds.

=== Road to the 2023 FIBA World Cup ===
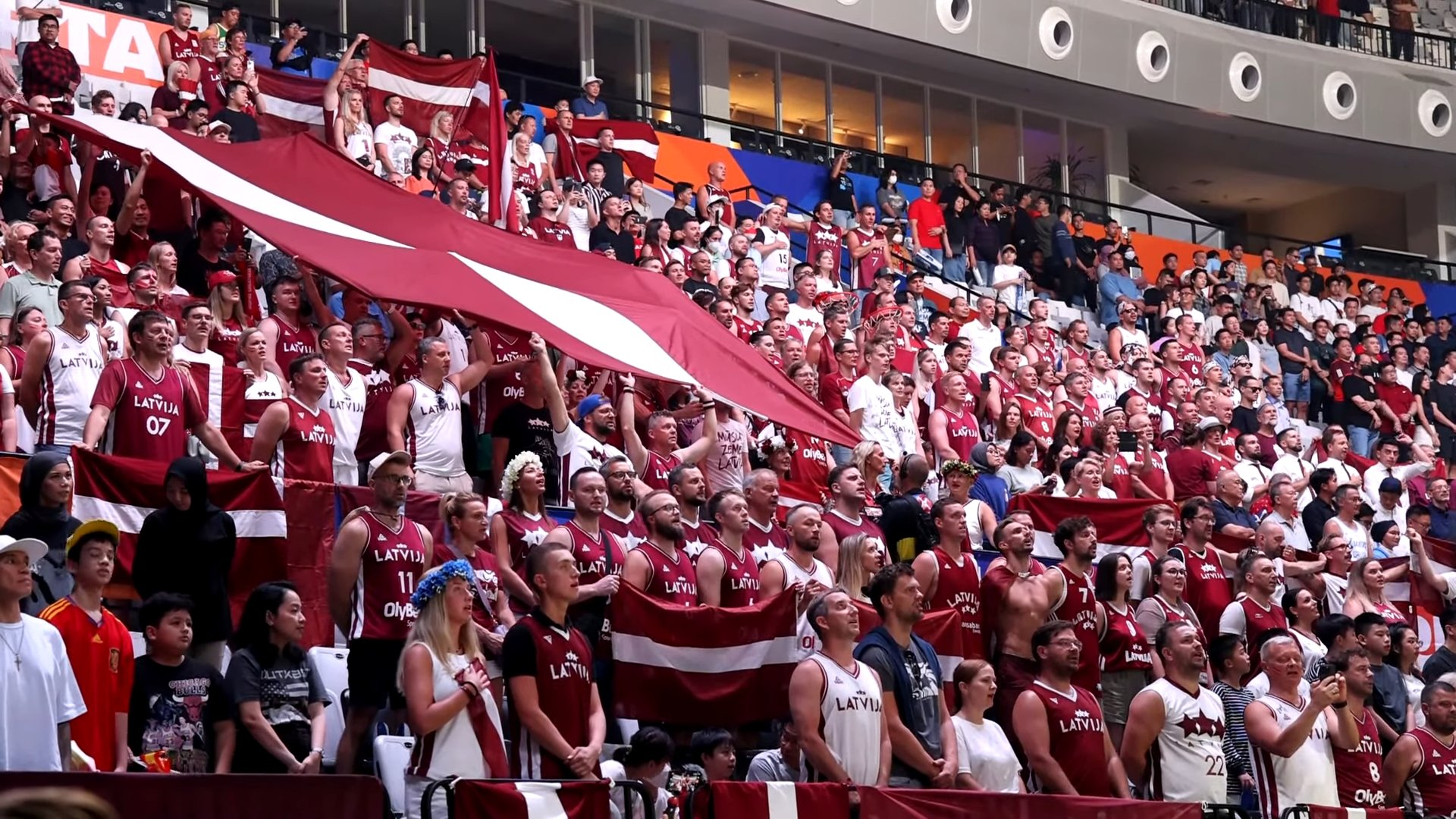
Latvian basketball fans in 2023

After the signing of Luca Banchi as head coach in 2021, Latvia went on to qualify for the 2023 FIBA World Cup, making it the first time the national team would appear at the World Cup finals.

Latvia entered the competition with high hopes, however, their biggest star Kristaps Porziņģis was unable to represent the team during the 2023 FIBA World Cup, due to failing to recover from an injury. Nevertheless, Latvia surprisingly eliminated European vice-champions France in the first round by winning a decisive game 88–86 and qualified to the second round of the 2023 FIBA World Cup with two victories (also versus Lebanon 109–70) and one 101–75 loss to Canada. One of the Latvian team leaders Dāvis Bertāns described victory versus France as "the biggest win in Latvian basketball history since 1935". In the second round Latvia achieved yet another memorable 74–69 victory versus the reigning world champions Spain. In the next game Latvia crushed Brazil 104–84 and advanced to the quarter-finals as the second-best team in the group, leaving Spain and Brazil behind without playoffs. But in quarter-final Latvia lost to Germany in the last seconds with the result 79–81 and did not directly qualify for the Paris 2024 Olympics. Latvia finished the tournament in fifth place after defeating Italy (82–87) and Lithuania (98–63).

== Competitive record ==
=== FIBA World Cup ===
World Cup					Qualification		
Year	Position	Pld	W	L	Pld	W	L
1950 to 1990	Part of Soviet Union						
(Canada) 1994	Did not qualify				EuroBasket served as qualifiers		
(Greece) 1998	Did not qualify				EuroBasket served as qualifiers		
(United States) 2002	Did not qualify				EuroBasket served as qualifiers		
(Japan) 2006	Did not qualify				EuroBasket served as qualifiers		
(Turkey) 2010	Did not qualify				EuroBasket served as qualifiers		
(Spain) 2014	Did not qualify				EuroBasket served as qualifiers		
(China) 2019	Did not qualify				12	7	5
(Philippines) (Japan) (Indonesia) 2023	5th	8	6	2	16	15	1
(Qatar) 2027	To be determined				In progress		
(France) 2031	To be determined				To be determined		
Total	1/8	8	6	2	28	22	6

=== Olympic Games ===
Olympic Games					Qualifying		
Year	Position	Pld	W	L	Pld	W	L
(Nazi Germany) 1936	15th	3	1	2			
1948 to 1988	Part of Soviet Union						
(Spain) 1992	Did not qualify				6	3	3
(United States) 1996	Did not qualify				Did not qualify		
(Australia) 2000	Did not qualify				Did not qualify		
(Greece) 2004	Did not qualify				Did not qualify		
(China) 2008	Did not qualify				Did not qualify		
(United Kingdom) 2012	Did not qualify				Did not qualify		
(Brazil) 2016	Did not qualify				3	2	1
(Japan) 2020	Did not qualify				Did not qualify		
(France) 2024	Did not qualify				4	2	2
(United States) 2028	To be determined				To be determined		
Total	1/10	3	1	2	13	7	6

=== EuroBasket ===
EuroBasket					Qualification		
Year	Position	Pld	W	L	Pld	W	L
(Switzerland) 1935	1st place, gold medalist(s)	3	3	0			
(Latvia) 1937	6th	5	3	2			
(Lithuania) 1939	2nd place, silver medalist(s)	7	5	2			
1946 to 1991	Part of Soviet Union						
(Germany) 1993	10th	6	2	4	8	5	3
(Greece) 1995	Did not qualify				6	0	6
(Spain) 1997	16th	5	0	5	10	7	3
(France) 1999	Did not qualify				10	3	7
(Turkey) 2001	8th	7	2	5	13	9	4
(Sweden) 2003	13th	3	0	3	10	6	4
(Serbia and Montenegro) 2005	13th	3	0	3	6	4	2
(Spain) 2007	13th	3	1	2	6	4	2
(Poland) 2009	13th	3	1	2	6	4	2
(Lithuania) 2011	21st	5	0	5	8	3	5
(Slovenia) 2013	11th	8	4	4	8	5	3
(France) (Croatia) (Germany) (Latvia) 2015	8th	9	4	5	6	6	0
(Finland) (Israel) (Romania) (Turkey) 2017	5th	7	5	2	Direct qualification		
(Czech Republic) (Georgia (country)) (Italy) (Germany) 2022	Did not qualify				6	1	5
(Cyprus) (Finland) (Poland) (Latvia) 2025	12th	6	3	3	6	6	0
(Estonia) (Greece) (Slovenia) (Spain) 2029	To be determined				To be determined		
Total	15/18	80	33	47	109	63	46

== Results and fixtures ==
Win Loss

=== 2025 ===
28 November 2025 2027 FIBA World Cup qualifiers – 1st round	Latvia	78–86	Netherlands	Riga, Latvia
19:30 (UTC+2)	Scoring by quarter: 12–26, 17–22, 21–17, 28–21
	Pts: Lomažs 17; Rebs: Mejeris 6 Asts: Lomažs, Mejeris 5	Boxscore	Pts: Kuta 17; Rebs: Kruithof 6 Asts: Van der Vuurst 8	Arena: Xiaomi Arena; Attendance: 9,068; Referees: Petar Pešić (SRB), Ilias Kounellis (CYP), Ioannis Tsibouris (GRE)

1 December 2025 2027 FIBA World Cup qualifiers – 1st round	Austria	68–86	Latvia	Vienna, Austria
20:20 (UTC+1)	Scoring by quarter: 24–20, 13–20, 17–29, 14–17
	Pts: Vujošević 27; Rebs: Vujošević 8 Asts: three players 3	Boxscore	Pts: Lomažs 24; Rebs: Šiliņš 5 Asts: Leimanis 6	Arena: Sport Arena Wien; Attendance: 1,000; Referees: Yener Yılmaz (TUR), Ivor Matějek (CZE), Viola Györgyi (NOR)

=== 2026 ===
27 February 2026 2027 FIBA World Cup qualifiers – 1st round	Latvia	82–84	Poland	Riga, Latvia
19:30 (UTC+2)	Scoring by quarter: 23–21, 25–21, 14–24, 20–18
	Pts: Strautiņš 27; Rebs: Strautiņš 6 Asts: A. Kurucs, Lomažs 3	Boxscore	Pts: Loyd 37; Rebs: Olejniczak 12; Asts: Sokołowski 5	Arena: Xiaomi Arena; Attendance: 10,829; Referees: Ariadna Chueca (ESP), Josip Jurčević (CRO), Tolga Edis (TUR)

1 March 2026 2027 FIBA World Cup qualifiers – 1st round	Poland	92–72	Latvia	Gdynia, Poland
20:30 (UTC+1)	Scoring by quarter: 23–16, 31–20, 16–18, 22–18
	Pts: Loyd 21; Rebs: Sokołowski 8 Asts: Ponitka 8	Boxscore	Pts: Strautiņš 20; Rebs: Blumbergs 6 Asts: three players 4	Arena: Gdynia Arena; Attendance: 4,105; Referees: Antonio Conde (ESP), Péter Praksch (HUN), Geert Jacobs (BEL)

3 July 2026 2027 FIBA World Cup qualifiers – 1st round	Netherlands	69–72	Latvia	Almere, Netherlands
19:30 (UTC+2)	Scoring by quarter: 26–18, 7–23, 21–11, 15–20
	Pts: Van der Vuurst 23; Rebs: Van der Vuurst 8 Asts: Van der Vuurst 5	Boxscore	Pts: Lomažs, Žagars 21; Rebs: Čavars, Strautiņš 7 Asts: Lomažs 4	Arena: Topsportcentrum; Attendance: 3,118; Referees: Ademir Zurapović (BIH), Marius Ciulin (ROU), Roko Hordov (CRO)

6 July 2026 2027 FIBA World Cup qualifiers – 1st round	Latvia	112–66	Austria	Riga, Latvia
19:30 (UTC+3)	Scoring by quarter: 22–22, 32–20, 30–9, 28–15
	Pts: Laksa 20; Rebs: Ķilps 6 Asts: Skuja 10	Boxscore	Pts: Kapic 19; Rebs: Kapic 6 Asts: Friedrich 5	Arena: Xiaomi Arena; Attendance: 9,219; Referees: Boris Krejić (SVN), Ivor Matějek (CZE), Mehmet Şahin (TUR)

27 August 2026 2027 FIBA World Cup qualifiers – 2nd round	Croatia	115–80	Latvia	Zadar, Croatia
20:00 (UTC+2)	Scoring by quarter: 23–14, 37–27, 25–16, 30–23
	Pts: Hezonja 28; Rebs: Šarić 9 Asts: Hezonja 7	Boxscore	Pts: Lomažs 23; Rebs: five players 3 Asts: Strautiņš 3	Arena: Krešimir Ćosić Hall; Attendance: 7,306; Referees: Ariadna Chueca (ESP), Georgios Poursanidis (GRE), Ioannis Agrafiotis (GRE)

30 August 2026 2027 FIBA World Cup qualifiers – 2nd round	Latvia	85–70	Israel	Riga, Latvia
19:00 (UTC+3)	Scoring by quarter: 21–22, 20–19, 26–17, 18–12
	Pts: Strautiņš 29; Rebs: Čavars 9 Asts: Lomažs 6	Boxscore	Pts: Madar 15; Rebs: Segev 7 Asts: Madar 5	Arena: Xiaomi Arena; Attendance: 10,321; Referees: Luis Castillo (ESP), Ventsislav Velikov (BUL), Viola Györgyi (NOR)

27 November 2026 2027 FIBA World Cup qualifiers – 2nd round	Latvia	vs.	Germany	Riga, Latvia
19:30 (UTC+2)
		Boxscore		Arena: Xiaomi Arena

30 November 2026 2027 FIBA World Cup qualifiers – 2nd round	Israel	vs.	Latvia	Riga, Latvia
19:30 (UTC+2)
		Boxscore		Arena: Xiaomi Arena

=== 2027 ===
25 February 2027 2027 FIBA World Cup qualifiers – 2nd round	Latvia	vs.	Croatia	Latvia
--:-- (UTC+2)
		Boxscore

28 February 2027 2027 FIBA World Cup qualifiers – 2nd round	Germany	vs.	Latvia	Germany
--:-- (UTC+1)
		Boxscore

== Team ==
=== Current roster ===
Roster for the 2027 FIBA World Cup Qualifiers matches on 27 and 30 August 2026 against Croatia and Israel.

Latvia men's national basketball team roster
Players
Coaches

Pos.	No.	Name	Age – Date of birth	Height	Club	Ctr.
PF	3	Roberts Blumbergs	28 – 29 April 1998	2.08 m (6 ft 10 in)	Petkim Spor	(Turkey)
F/C	5	Mareks Mejeris	34 – 2 September 1991	2.07 m (6 ft 9 in)	Stal Ostrów	(Poland)
SF	12	Artūrs Strautiņš	27 – 23 October 1998	1.98 m (6 ft 6 in)	Derthona	(Italy)
C	18	Klāvs Čavars	30 – 11 February 1996	2.08 m (6 ft 10 in)	Rīgas Zeļļi	(Latvia)
SG	19	Rihards Lomažs	30 – 13 April 1996	1.93 m (6 ft 4 in)	Free agent
G/F	22	Tomas Talcis	18 – 22 September 2007	1.98 m (6 ft 6 in)	Rīgas Zeļļi	(Latvia)
G/F	25	Mārtiņš Laksa	36 – 26 June 1990	1.98 m (6 ft 6 in)	Free agent
PF	28	Mārcis Šteinbergs	24 – 28 August 2001	2.05 m (6 ft 9 in)	Murcia	(Spain)
SF	35	Kristaps Ķilps	25 – 20 March 2001	1.94 m (6 ft 4 in)	Twarde Pierniki	(Poland)
G	44	Toms Leimanis	32 – 7 August 1994	1.90 m (6 ft 3 in)	Ourense	(Spain)
PF	51	Anrijs Miška	26 – 14 January 2000	2.07 m (6 ft 9 in)	Start Lublin	(Poland)
PG	66	Kristers Zoriks	28 – 25 May 1998	1.93 m (6 ft 4 in)	Legia Warsaw	(Poland)

Head coach

- (Latvia) Jānis Gailītis

Assistant coach(es)

- (Latvia) Artūrs Visockis-Rubenis
- (Latvia) Mārtiņš Gulbis
- (Latvia) Kaspars Vecvagars

Legend

- (C) Team captain
- Club – describes last
  club before the competition
- Age – describes age
  on 27 August 2026

=== Depth chart ===
Pos.	Starting 5	Bench 1	Bench 2
C	Kristaps Porziņģis	Mareks Mejeris	Klāvs Čavars
PF	Rolands Šmits	Artūrs Strautiņš	Mārcis Šteinbergs
SF	Dāvis Bertāns	Mārtiņš Laksa
SG	Artūrs Kurucs	Rihards Lomažs
PG	Artūrs Žagars	Kristers Zoriks

=== Notable players ===
Current notable players from Latvia who have played for the national team:

Current notable players roster
Players
Coaches

Pos.	No.	Name	Age – Date of birth	Height	Club	Ctr.
PG		Adrians Andževs	19 – 23 February 2007	1.92 m (6 ft 4 in)	VEF Rīga	(Latvia)
SG		Artis Ate	36 – 29 July 1989	1.93 m (6 ft 4 in)	Valmiera Glass Via	(Latvia)
F		Dāvis Bertāns	33 – 12 November 1992	2.08 m (6 ft 10 in)	Dubai	(United Arab Emirates)
F		Jānis Bērziņš	32 – 4 May 1993	2.01 m (6 ft 7 in)	Rīgas Zeļļi	(Latvia)
SG		Roberts Bērziņš	25 – 10 January 2001	1.91 m (6 ft 3 in)	Rīgas Zeļļi	(Latvia)
PG		Renārs Birkāns	28 – 29 June 1997	1.86 m (6 ft 1 in)	Ventspils	(Latvia)
SG		Roberts Blūms	20 – 2 November 2005	1.92 m (6 ft 4 in)	Davidson Wildcats	(United States)
F/C		Artjoms Butjankovs	34 – 26 August 1991	2.04 m (6 ft 8 in)	Free agent
PF		Andrejs Gražulis	32 – 21 July 1993	2.02 m (6 ft 8 in)	Türk Telekom	(Spain)
F/C		Rolands Freimanis	38 – 21 January 1988	2.08 m (6 ft 10 in)	Rīgas Zeļļi	(Latvia)
F/C		Krišs Helmanis	23 – 7 April 2002	2.04 m (6 ft 8 in)	Krka	(Slovenia)
SF		Rihards Kuksiks	37 – 17 July 1988	2.00 m (6 ft 7 in)	Free agent
G		Artūrs Kurucs	26 – 19 January 2000	1.93 m (6 ft 4 in)	Breogán	(Spain)
PF		Rodions Kurucs	28 – 5 February 1998	2.06 m (6 ft 9 in)	Baskonia	(Spain)
F		Rodijs Mačoha	23 – 29 October 2002	2.00 m (6 ft 7 in)	Rīgas Zeļļi	(Latvia)
C		Mārtiņš Meiers	34 – 30 March 1991	2.08 m (6 ft 10 in)	Ungmennafélagið Sindri	(Iceland)
C		Anžejs Pasečņiks	30 – 20 December 1995	2.16 m (7 ft 1 in)	Hsinchu Toplus Lioneers	(Taiwan)
C		Kristaps Porziņģis	30 – 2 August 1995	2.21 m (7 ft 3 in)	Golden State Warriors	(United States)
C		Kārlis Šiliņš	28 – 22 July 1997	2.10 m (6 ft 11 in)	Pistoia	(Italy)
SF		Ojārs Siliņš	32 – 20 July 1993	2.03 m (6 ft 8 in)	Legia Warsaw	(Poland)
G		Aigars Šķēle	33 – 4 December 1992	1.92 m (6 ft 4 in)	Czarni Słupsk	(Poland)
PG		Toms Skuja	24 – 2 January 2002	1.90 m (6 ft 3 in)	Ludwigsburg	(Germany)
PF		Rolands Šmits	30 – 25 June 1995	2.07 m (6 ft 9 in)	Anadolu Efes	(Turkey)
SF		Roberts Stumbris	32 – 9 July 1993	1.99 m (6 ft 6 in)	Melilla	(Spain)
PG		Mārcis Vītols	33 – 2 May 1992	1.86 m (6 ft 1 in)	Valmiera Glass Via	(Latvia)
PG		Artūrs Žagars	25 – 21 April 2000	1.90 m (6 ft 3 in)	Fenerbahçe	(Turkey)

Legend

- Club – describes current club
- Age – describes age
  on 15 October 2026

=== Head coach history ===
- (Latvia) Valdemārs Baumanis – (1935–1936)
- (Latvia) Ādolfs Grasis – (1937)
- (Latvia) Valdemārs Baumanis – (1939)
- (Latvia) Armands Krauliņš – (1993–1996)
- (Latvia) Igors Miglinieks – (1997–1999)
- (Latvia) Armands Krauliņš – (2000–2003)
- (Latvia) Kārlis Muižnieks – (2004–2007)
- (Lithuania) Kęstutis Kemzūra – (2008–2009)
- (Latvia) Ainars Bagatskis – (2010–2017)
- (Latvia) Arnis Vecvagars – (2017–2019)
- (Latvia) Roberts Štelmahers – (2019–2021)
- (Italy) Luca Banchi – (2021–2025)
- (Spain) Sito Alonso – (2025–2026)
- (Latvia) Jānis Gailītis – (2026–present)

=== Notable players ===
Retired players:

- Andris Biedriņš – was the highest ever NBA drafted Latvian basketball player until 2015. In the 2004 NBA draft, the Golden State Warriors selected him #11. Only Kristaps Porzingis has been drafted higher.
- Kaspars Kambala – one of the best 2000s Latvian basketball players.
- Sandis Valters – also one of the best 2000s Latvian basketball players.
- Ainars Bagatskis – long-term national team's member.
- Igors Miglinieks – Olympic champion with the Soviet Union squad.
- Valdis Valters – World champion. Valters returned to the court after his first retirement and represented the Latvia national team in the Qualifying tournament of the 1992 Olympics.
- Alfreds Krauklis – one of the key players in 1939.
- Karlis Arents – one of the key players in 1939.
- Visvaldis Melderis – team's third leading scorer in 1939.
- Voldemārs Šmits – team's second leading scorer in 1937 and 1939.
- Rūdolfs Jurciņš – national team's leading scorer in 1935, tournament's leading scorer in 1937.

=== Past rosters ===
1935 EuroBasket: finished (gold) among 10 teams

3 Eduards Andersons, 4 Aleksejs Anufrijevs, 5 Mārtiņš Grundmanis, 6 Herberts Gubiņš, 8 Rūdolfs Jurciņš, 9 Jānis Lidmanis, 10 Visvaldis Melderis, 11 Džems Raudziņš (Coach: Valdemārs Baumanis)

1936 Olympic Games: finished 18th among 21 teams

1 Rūdolfs Jurciņš, 2 Visvaldis Melderis, 3 Eduards Andersons, 4 Džems Raudziņš, 5 Voldemārs Elmūts, 6 Mārtiņš Grundmanis, 7 Maksis Kazaks (Coach: Valdemārs Baumanis)

1937 EuroBasket: finished 6th among 8 teams

3 Eduards Andersons, 4 Aleksejs Anufrijevs, 5 Mārtiņš Grundmanis, 6 Janis Jansons, 7 Rūdolfs Jurciņš, 8 Andrejs Krisons, 9 Aleksandrs Martinsons, 10 Visvaldis Melderis, 11 Džems Raudziņš, 12 Voldemārs Šmits (Coach: Ādolfs Grasis)

1939 EuroBasket: finished (silver) among 8 teams

3 Aleksandrs Vanags, 4 Alfrēds Krauklis, 5 Teodors Grinbergs, 6 Maksis Kazaks, 8 Voldemārs Šmits, 9 Jānis Graudiņš, 11 Karlis Arents, 12 Juris Solovjovs, 14 Karlis Satins, 18 Visvaldis Melderis (Coach: Valdemārs Baumanis)

1993 EuroBasket: finished 9th among 16 teams

4 Edgars Šneps, 5 Jānis Āzacis, 6 Igors Meļņiks, 7 Kārlis Muižnieks, 8 Ivars Zankovskis, 9 Ainars Bagatskis, 10 Dzintars Jaunzems, 11 Ivars Liepa, 12 Raimonds Miglinieks, 13 Edmunds Valeiko, 14 Andrejs Bondarenko, 15 Aigars Zeidaks (Coach: Armands Krauliņš)

1997 EuroBasket: finished 16th among 16 teams

4 Uvis Helmanis, 5 Jānis Āzacis, 6 Edmunds Valeiko, 7 Roberts Štelmahers, 8 Kārlis Muižnieks, 9 Edgars Šneps, 10 Raimonds Miglinieks, 11 Ainars Bagatskis, 12 Ivars Liepa, 13 Ralfs Jansons, 14 Andrejs Bondarenko, 15 Igors Meļņiks (Coach: Igors Miglinieks)

2001 EuroBasket: finished 8th among 16 teams

4 Uvis Helmanis, 5 Aigars Vītols, 6 Kaspars Cipruss, 7 Roberts Štelmahers, 8 Edmunds Valeiko, 9 Māris Ļaksa, 10 Kristaps Valters, 11 Raimonds Miglinieks, 12 Ainars Bagatskis, 13 Raitis Grafs, 14 Kaspars Kambala, 15 Arnis Vecvagars (Coach: Armands Krauliņš)

2003 EuroBasket: finished 13th among 16 teams

4 Uvis Helmanis, 5 Aigars Vītols, 6 Trojs Ostlers, 7 Roberts Štelmahers, 8 Armands Šķēle, 9 Edgars Šneps, 10 Kristaps Valters, 11 Māris Ļaksa, 12 Ainars Bagatskis, 13 Raitis Grafs, 14 Kaspars Kambala, 15 Arnis Vecvagars (Coach: Armands Krauliņš)

2005 EuroBasket: finished 14th among 16 teams

4 Uvis Helmanis, 5 Aigars Vītols, 6 Armands Šķēle, 7 Roberts Štelmahers, 8 Jānis Blūms, 9 Sandis Valters, 10 Kristaps Valters, 11 Ivars Timermanis, 12 Mārtiņš Skirmants, 13 Raitis Grafs, 14 Kaspars Cipruss, 15 Kristaps Janičenoks (Coach: Kārlis Muižnieks)

2007 EuroBasket: finished 13th among 16 teams

4 Uvis Helmanis, 5 Aigars Vītols, 6 Armands Šķēle, 7 Jānis Blūms, 8 Raimonds Vaikulis, 9 Gatis Jahovičs, 10 Sandis Valters, 11 Pāvels Veselovs, 12 Kaspars Cipruss, 13 Raitis Grafs, 14 Kristaps Janičenoks, 15 Andris Biedriņš (Coach: Kārlis Muižnieks)

2009 EuroBasket: finished 13th among 16 teams

4 Uvis Helmanis, 5 Aigars Vītols, 6 Armands Šķēle, 7 Jānis Blūms, 8 Ernests Kalve, 9 Kristaps Valters, 10 Gatis Jahovičs, 11 Kaspars Kambala, 12 Rolands Freimanis, 13 Artūrs Štālbergs, 14 Kristaps Janičenoks, 15 Andris Biedriņš (Coach: Kęstutis Kemzūra)

2011 EuroBasket: finished 21st among 24 teams

4 Mārtiņš Meiers, 5 Dairis Bertāns, 6 Rolands Freimanis, 7 Jānis Blūms, 8 Mareks Jurevičus, 9 Edgars Jeromanovs, 10 Rihards Kuksiks, 11 Mareks Mejeris, 12 Dāvis Bertāns, 13 Jānis Strēlnieks, 14 Artūrs Bērziņš, 15 Andrejs Šeļakovs (Coach: Ainars Bagatskis)

2013 EuroBasket: finished 11th among 24 teams

4 Mārtiņš Meiers, 5 Mareks Mejeris, 6 Rolands Freimanis, 7 Jānis Blūms, 8 Jānis Bērziņš, 9 Dairis Bertāns, 10 Rihards Kuksiks, 11 Armands Šķēle, 12 Kristaps Janičenoks, 13 Jānis Strēlnieks, 14 Kaspars Bērziņš, 15 Andrejs Šeļakovs (Coach: Ainars Bagatskis)

2015 EuroBasket: finished 8th among 24 teams

5 Mareks Mejeris, 6 Rolands Freimanis, 7 Jānis Blūms (C), 9 Dairis Bertāns, 10 Jānis Timma, 12 Kristaps Janičenoks, 13 Jānis Strēlnieks, 14 Kaspars Bērziņš, 19 Kaspars Vecvagars, 23 Haralds Kārlis, 31 Žanis Peiners, 33 Mārtiņš Meiers (Coach: Ainars Bagatskis)

2017 EuroBasket: finished 5th among 24 teams

6 Kristaps Porziņģis, 7 Jānis Blūms (C), 8 Dāvis Bertāns, 9 Dairis Bertāns, 10 Jānis Timma, 11 Rolands Šmits, 12 Kristaps Janičenoks,
13 Jānis Strēlnieks, 21 Aigars Šķēle, 24 Andrejs Gražulis, 31 Žanis Peiners, 33 Mārtiņš Meiers (Coach: Ainars Bagatskis)

2023 FIBA World Cup: finished 5th among 32 teams

00 Rodions Kurucs, 8 Dāvis Bertāns, 9 Dairis Bertāns (C), 11 Rolands Šmits, 12 Artūrs Strautiņš, 18 Klāvs Čavars, 21 Aigars Šķēle,
24 Andrejs Gražulis, 32 Anžejs Pasečņiks, 47 Artūrs Kurucs, 55 Artūrs Žagars, 66 Kristers Zoriks (Coach: Luca Banchi)

2025 EuroBasket: finished 12th among 24 teams

5 Mareks Mejeris, 6 Kristaps Porziņģis, 8 Dāvis Bertāns, 9 Dairis Bertāns (C), 11 Rolands Šmits, 18 Klāvs Čavars, 19 Rihards Lomažs,
24 Andrejs Gražulis, 28 Mārcis Šteinbergs, 47 Artūrs Kurucs, 55 Artūrs Žagars, 66 Kristers Zoriks (Coach: Luca Banchi)

== Record against other teams ==
*Friendly matches not counted

Team	Pld	W	L	PF	PA	PD
Albania	1	1	0	94	78	+16
Austria	1	1	0	86	68	+18
Belarus	5	5	0	448	376	+72
Belgium	7	6	1	520	474	+46
Bosnia and Herzegovina	7	2	5	575	565	+10
Brazil	2	1	1	173	178	–5
Bulgaria	4	1	3	356	351	+5
Cameroon	1	1	0	72	59	+13
Canada	2	0	2	98	135	−37
Croatia	7	1	6	547	636	−89
Czech Republic	7	4	3	538	527	+11
Czechoslovakia	1	1	0	44	11	+33
Denmark	2	2	0	168	140	+28
Egypt	1 (Note: Includes a 2–0 forfeit win at EuroBasket 1937)	1	0	2	0	+2
England	4	3	1	334	299	+35
Estonia	15	9	6	1127	1075	+52
Finland	3	3	0	288	164	+124
France	10	3	7	692	743	−51
(Georgia (country)) Georgia	5	3	2	426	366	+60
Germany	6	2	4	493	494	–1
(United Kingdom) Great Britain	3	3	0	263	235	+28
Greece	6	3	3	470	458	+12
Hungary	6	5	1	447	346	+101
Israel	9	2	7	699	757	−58
Italy	10	5	5	735	787	−52
Japan	1	1	0	88	48	+40
Lebanon	1	1	0	109	70	+39
Lithuania	9	2	7	662	693	−31
Luxembourg	1	1	0	106	65	+41
Moldova	1	1	0	110	64	+46
Montenegro	6	3	3	478	484	−6
Netherlands	4	3	1	341	311	+30
North Macedonia	3	2	1	237	228	+9
Norway	1	1	0	114	74	+40
Philippines	1	0	1	80	89	–9
Poland	9	3	6	574	590	–16
Portugal	8	6	2	635	547	+88
Puerto Rico	1	0	1	70	77	−7
Romania	6	6	0	531	406	+125
Russia	6	1	5	458	538	−80
Serbia	6	1	5	476	508	−32
Serbia and Montenegro	3	0	3	234	304	−70
Slovakia	8	8	0	683	524	+159
Slovenia	8	4	4	669	733	−64
Spain	10	4	6	754	788	−34
Sweden	6	4	2	470	442	+28
Switzerland	4	4	0	311	238	+73
Turkey	9	4	5	729	733	-4
Ukraine	7	4	3	561	509	+52
Uruguay	1	1	0	20	17	+3
Total	237	129	108	18,540	17,776	+764

== See also ==
- Sport in Latvia
- Latvia men's national under-20 basketball team
- Latvia men's national under-19 basketball team
- Latvia men's national under-16 basketball team
