= Maksis =

Male given name

- Gender: Male
- Name day: 29 May

Origin
- Region of origin: Latvia

Other names
- Related names: Maxim, Maxime

Maksis is a Latvian masculine given name and may refer to:

- Maksis Kazāks (1912–1983), Latvian basketball player
- Maksis Lazersons (1887–1951), Latvian politician, jurist and philosopher
- Maksis Reiters (1886–1950), Latvian-Soviet military commander
