= Krauklis =

Krauklis (feminine: Kraukliņa) is a Latvian language surname from the Latvian word for raven. Notable people with the name include:

- Alfrēds Krauklis (1911–1991), Latvian basketball player and coach
- Vents Armands Krauklis (1964), Latvian politician and musician
