= BK Skonto =

Latvian basketbal club

Skonto
- Leagues: LBL; NEBL
- Founded: 2001
- Dissolved: 2004
- History: BK Skonto; 2001–2004
- Arena: Rīgas sporta manēža (capacity: 3,000); Daugavas Sporta Nams (capacity: 1,500)
- Location: Riga, Latvia
- Team colors
- President: Guntis Indriksons
- Head coach: Guntis Endzels
Home	Away

BK Skonto is the name of a former professional basketball club that was based in Riga, Latvia.

== History ==
BK Skonto was founded in 2001 as a basketball section of FC Skonto. The basketball team was founded by FC Skonto president Guntis Indriksons and basketball legend Valdis Valters. Skonto took the place in Latvian Basketball League from BK Brocēni, another basketball club from Riga, which stopped to exist in 2001. Skonto's main focus was developing young Latvian talents and they did so by developing players such as Andris Biedriņš, Kristaps Valters, Jānis Blūms, Sandis Valters, Kaspars Bērziņš, Kristaps Janičenoks and others.

Skonto lasted for three seasons, making the Latvian league finals in every one of them. In 2004 club's president Guntis Indriksons announced that he would not continue to support the basketball section, thus, ending the existence of BK Skonto.

== Season by season record ==
Season	League	Regional	Europe
2001–02	Latvian League; Runner-up	North European Basketball League; Second round	Did not participate
2002–03	Latvian League; Runner-up	No tournament	FIBA Europe Champions Cup; Pan-European phase
2003–04	Latvian League; Runner-up	No tournament	FIBA Europe League; Qualifying round

== Notable players ==
- Kaspars Bērziņš
- Andris Biedriņš
- Jānis Blūms
- Kaspars Cipruss
- Gatis Jahovičs
- Kristaps Janičenoks
- Edgars Šneps
- Kristaps Valters
- Sandis Valters
- Arnis Vecvagars
- Aigars Vītols
- Paul Graham
- Dametri Hill
- Darren Kelly
- Troy Ostler
- Lamayn Wilson
- Arvydas Straupis
- Rytis Vaišvila

== Head coaches ==
- Valdis Valters
- Raivo Otersons
- Guntis Endzels
