= Aigars Vītols =

Latvian basketball player and politician

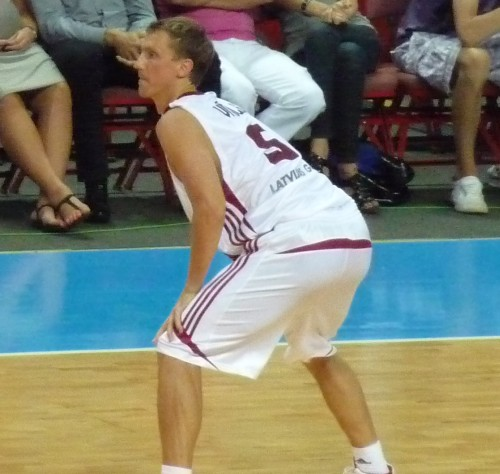
Aigars Vītols

Aigars Vītols (born February 15, 1976) is a former Latvian professional basketball player and a current politician for the Latvian Union of Greens and Farmers.

== Sports career ==
Vītols played the shooting guard position: He played most of his career in Latvia, winning six national championships and one finals MVP award.

When he played for Spanish team Baloncesto Fuenlabrada, he was the best three-point shooter of Liga ACB in the 2005-06 season.

Mostly he was known for his terrific long-range shooting and defensive skills.

Vītols played for Latvia national basketball team at five EuroBaskets.

=== Pro clubs ===
- 1993-94: VEF/Ādaži
- 1994-98: BK Metropole
- 1998-02: BK Ventspils
- 2002: KD Slovan
- 2002: Barons LMT
- 2002-03: BK Skonto
- 2003-05: BK Ventspils
- 2005-06: Baloncesto Fuenlabrada
- 2006-08: BK Ventspils
- 2008-09: ASK Rīga
- 2009-11: Barons LMT
- 2012-2013: BK Jēkabpils

== Political career ==
In the 2013 local elections, Vītols was elected for the Ķekava regional council on the Vidzemes party list, but he changed political allegiance in 2016 to the Latvian Farmers' Union. In the 2017 local elections, he was elected to the Ķekava regional council on the LFU list. He was chosen to be the vice mayor.

He failed to get elected as a candidate for the Union of Greens and Farmers in the 13th Latvian national elections.

In September 2019, the Corruption Prevention and Combating Bureau arrested A. Vītols, accusing him of possible bribery in connection with construction work.
