= Valdis Valters =

Latvian basketball player (born 1957)

Personal information
- Born: 4 August 1957 (age 69) Riga, Latvian SSR, Soviet Union
- Listed height: 6 ft 4 in (1.93 m)
- Listed weight: 195 lb (88 kg)

Career information
- Playing career: 1976–1989, 1992–1997
- Position: Point guard
- Number: 10
- Coaching career: 1996–2003, 2006–2010

Career history

Playing
- 1976–1989: VEF Rīga
- 1992–1997: BK Brocēni

Coaching
- 1996–2000: BK Brocēni
- 2000–2003: BK Skonto
- 2006–2007: ASK Juniors
- 2007–2010: VEF Rīga

Career highlights
- As player: EuroBasket MVP (1981); 9× Latvian League champion (1974, 1979, 1982, 1984–1986, 1992, 1993, 1996); As head coach: 3× Latvian League champion (1997, 1998, 1999)
- FIBA Hall of Fame
Medals
Men's basketball
Representing Soviet Union
World Championships
| Gold medal – first place | 1982 Colombia |
| Silver medal – second place | 1986 Spain |
European Championships
| Gold medal – first place | 1981 Czechoslovakia |
| Bronze medal – third place | 1983 France |
| Gold medal – first place | 1985 West Germany |
| Silver medal – second place | 1987 Greece |

Valdis Valters (born 4 August 1957) is a retired Latvian professional basketball player. He played at the point guard position for the senior USSR national team. He is regarded as one of the greatest players to have played the game in Europe in the 1980s. Considering his lengthy work and deep connection to the sport, Valters has been one of the most influential people in Latvian basketball history. He became a FIBA Hall of Fame player in 2017.

== Club career ==
Valters spent most of his club career playing with the Latvian club VEF Rīga. In 1982, he set the USSR Premier League's all-time record for points scored in a single game, when he scored 69 points against Dynamo Moscow.

== National team career ==
=== Soviet national team ===
Valters first made his name in European basketball when he was named the MVP of EuroBasket 1981, after he averaged 16.7 points per game, to lead his USSR national team to the gold medal. He was also on the All-Tournament Team of EuroBasket 1985.

Valters also played a key role on the USSR national team that won the gold at the 1982 FIBA World Championship, in Colombia, where he was a starting point guard, and averaged 14.0 points per game.

At the 1986 FIBA World Championship, Valters helped the Soviet Union to rally from a nine-point deficit, in the final minute of the game, by hitting a three-pointer at the end of regulation, to send the semifinal game against Yugoslavia to overtime, and eventually earn a 91–90 win.

=== Latvian national team ===
In 1992, after he had stopped playing basketball at the pro level, Valters returned to the court, and represented the senior Latvian national team at the 1992 Summer Olympic Games Qualifying Tournament.

== Coaching career ==
After his basketball playing career ended, Valters also worked as a basketball coach and general manager. He founded his own basketball school, the Valtera Basketbola Skola (VBS), now known as Keizarmezs, whose alumni includes former NBA player Andris Biedriņš, as well as other top Latvian players. He also helped to create the basketball league for Latvian youth players, the LJBL.

== Other works ==
In 2013, Valters released his autobiographical book, called "Dumpinieks ar ideāliem" (Rebel with ideals). He is currently working as an analyst for the Latvian TV channel, TV6, as a host of the weekly sports show Overtime.

== Personal life ==
Both of his sons, Kristaps and Sandis, are also professional basketball players.

Valters grandson (Kristaps son) is also named Valdis and also is a basketball player who led the Latvia men's national under-18 basketball team to a 4th place during the 2025 FIBA U18 EuroBasket and was included into the All-Tournament Team.
