= Raimonds Miglinieks =

Latvian basketball player and coach

Personal information
- Born: 16 July 1970 (age 56) Riga, Latvian SSR, Soviet Union
- Listed height: 6 ft 2.75 in (1.90 m)
- Listed weight: 200 lb (91 kg)

Career information
- College: Riverside CC (1992–1994); UC Irvine (1994–1996)
- NBA draft: 1996: undrafted
- Playing career: 1996–2003
- Position: Point guard

Career history

Playing
- 1988–1992: VEF Rīga
- 1996–1997: ASK/Brocēni/LMT
- 1997–1999: Śląsk Wrocław
- 1999–2000: WTK Anwil Włocławek
- 2000–2001: Śląsk Wrocław
- 2001–2002: CSKA Moscow
- 2002–2003: Idea Śląsk Wrocław

Coaching
- 2005: BK Riga

Career highlights
- As player: FIBA SuproLeague assists leader (2001); 3× PLK champion (1998, 1999, 2001); LBL champion (1996); NCAA assists leader (1996); Big West Player of the Year (1996); 2× First-team All-Big West (1995, 1996)

Raimonds Miglinieks (born 16 July 1970) is a Latvian former professional basketball player and coach. Standing at a height of 1.90 m (6'2 3/4") tall, he was a point guard with excellent court vision.

== College career ==
Miglinieks played college basketball in the United States, at the University of California, Irvine, with the Anteaters. He led the NCAA assists leader in the 1995–96 season, with an average of 8.5 assists per game. He was named the Big West Conference Player of the Year in 1996.

== Professional career ==
Miglinieks played in the EuroLeague with Śląsk Wrocław and CSKA Moscow. He led the 2000–01 FIBA SuproLeague in assists, with an average of 7.0 per game.

== National team career ==
Miglinieks was a regular member of the senior men's Latvian national basketball team. He was a part of the Latvian squad that finished in 8th place at the 2001 EuroBasket.

== Professional career ==
Miglinieks' brother, Igors, was also a professional basketball player.
