= Kristaps Valters =

Latvian basketball player and coach

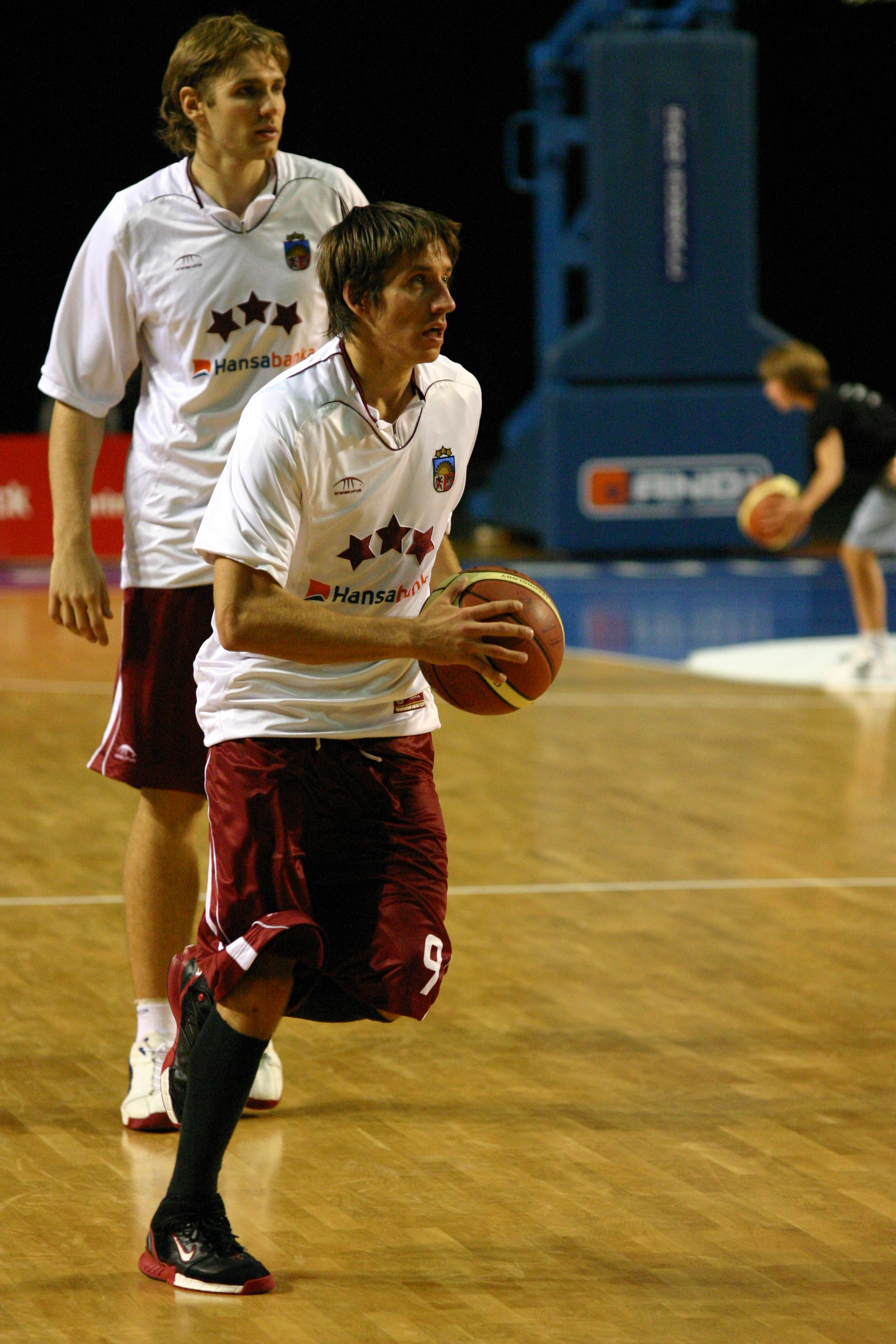
- Valters playing for Latvia in 2006

Personal information
- Born: September 18, 1981 (age 45) Riga, Latvian SSR
- Listed height: 6 ft 1.5 in (1.87 m)
- Listed weight: 185 lb (84 kg)

Career information
- NBA draft: 2003: undrafted
- Playing career: 1998–2017
- Position: Point guard
- Number: 9, 18
- Coaching career: 2017–2018

Career history

Playing
- 1998–2000: ASK/Brocēni/LMT
- 2000–2001: Antalya BB
- 2001–2003: Skonto
- 2003: Panionios
- 2003–2004: Skonto
- 2004–2006: EWE Baskets Oldenburg
- 2006–2007: Amatori Udine
- 2007–2008: Triumph Lyubertsy
- 2008–2009: Fuenlabrada
- 2009–2010: Joventut Badalona
- 2010–2011: Fuenlabrada
- 2011–2012: Unicaja Málaga
- 2012: Artland Dragons
- 2012–2013: Fuenlabrada
- 2013–2014: TED Ankara Kolejliler
- 2014: Barons
- 2014–2016: Türk Telekom
- 2017: Valmiera/ORDO

Coaching
- 2017–2018: Valmiera/ORDO
- 2024–: BK Sigulda

Kristaps Valters (born September 18, 1981) is a Latvian former professional basketball player. After retiring he became a coach, and is currently working as a head coach for Valmiera/ORDO.

== Playing career ==
Valters first played professionally in 1998, for ASK/Brocēni/LMT. In 2000, Valters signed his first foreign contract, with Antalya Büyükşehir Belediyesi, but played there only one season. He then returned to the Latvian Basketball League, signing a two-year contract with the newly created team Skonto.

In 2003, he played in the NBA Summer League for the Cleveland Cavaliers alongside number #1 pick in that draft LeBron James. In the fall of that year, he returned to Europe and played for Panionios. Valters did not stay there for long and in December 2004, he returned to play for Skonto.

From 2004 to 2006, he played for the Germany's Basketball Bundesliga club EWE Baskets Oldenburg. Then he went to Italy and played for Pallalcesto Amatori Udine. During the season in Italy he was named as Week 8 MVP of ULEB Cup.

In 2007, he signed a contract with Scafati Basket, but never played there because he was injured and the team terminated his contract. In November 2007, Valters signed with Russian team Triumph Lyubertsy.

In the summer of 2008, he signed a contract with Liga ACB team Fuenlabrada and had a breakout season. The team wanted to retain Valters and offered him a three-year contract for about two million dollars, but Valters opted to sign a two-year contract with DKV Joventut in July 2009 replacing Ricky Rubio.

In August 2010, he returned to Baloncesto Fuenlabrada, where he had another great year by leading his underdog squad to the ACB League's play-offs. For the 2011–12 season he signed with Unicaja Málaga, helping team to reach Euroleague's Top16. Kristaps ended season in Malaga as ACB's leading three-point shooter.

Prior to 2012–13 season Valters joined German squad Artland Dragons, but later returned to Fuenlabrada, where he finished the season.

For the 2013–14 season Valters moved to Turkey, signing with TED Ankara Kolejliler and guiding his team to Eurocup Quarterfinals. During the season Valters delivered some very impressive outings that included 26 points and 7 assists in a road win over Brose Baskets on January 29, 2014. Valters capped season with a 31-point and 6 assists performance, shooting 9-10 from three in a win over Pınar Karşıyaka on 7 May 2014.

On December 3, 2014 he signed with Türk Telekom. On February 20, 2017, Valters signed with the Latvian team Valmiera. On May 1, 2017, Valters announced that he has to retire from playing due to health problems.

== National team career ==
Valters was a member of the senior Latvian national team in four EuroBasket tournaments (2001, 2003, 2005, and 2009).

== Personal life ==
Valters' father Valdis, is a former Soviet Union basketball star, and his brother, Sandis, also played professional basketball.
