= Uvis Helmanis =

Latvian basketball player

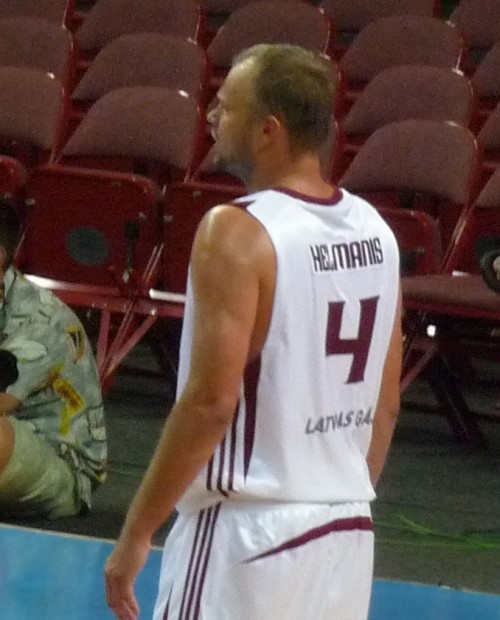
- Helmanis in 2009

Personal information
- Born: June 10, 1972 (age 54) Talsi, Latvian SSR, Soviet Union
- Listed height: 6 ft 8.5 in (2.04 m)
- Listed weight: 255 lb (116 kg)

Career information
- Playing career: 1992–2010
- Position: Forward
- Number: 4, 35, 36
- Coaching career: 2010–present

Career history

Playing
- 1992–1994: Bonus Riga
- 1994–1998: BK Metropole
- 1998–1999: BK Brocēni
- 1999–2000: Bobry Bytom
- 2000–2001: Stal Ostrów Wielkopolski
- 2001: BK Gulbenes Buki
- 2001: Śląsk Wrocław
- 2001–2002: Bayer Leverkusen
- 2002–2006: GHP Bamberg
- 2006–2008: BK Ventspils
- 2008–2009: ASK Riga
- 2009–2010: BK Barons Kvartāls

Coaching
- 2010: BK Barons Kvartāls
- 2011: Czarni Słupsk (assistant)
- 2011–2013: VEF Rīga (assistant)
- 2013–2016: Liepāja/Triobet
- 2016–2017: Valmiera/ORDO
- 2018: BK Ogre (assistant)
- 2018–2020: Rytas Vilnius (assistant)
- 2020–2022: Löwen Erfurt
- 2022–2024: Alvark Tokyo (assistant)

Uvis Helmanis (born June 10, 1972) is a Latvian professional basketball coach and former player who played at the power forward position. He was most recently an assistant coach for Alvark Tokyo of the B.League.

== Professional career ==
Helmanis has won national championships in three countries: Latvia, Poland, and Germany. After four years at Bamberg, he returned to Latvia and played for BK Ventspils, competing in the Baltic League and ULEB Cup. He is described as a non-vocal leader and an important member of the team.

== National team career ==
Helmanis has been a member of the Latvian national team since the 1990s. In the summer of 2009, Helmanis became the first Latvian player to participate in six EuroBasket tournaments.

== Coaching career ==
After winning the Latvian Championship with Barons LMT in 2010 he retired as a player and became a head coach of the team. After unsuccessful results he was fired in midseason and went to Poland to work for the assistant of Dainius Adomaitis, head coach of Czarni Słupsk. After one season Uvis came back to Latvia and joined a coach room of BC VEF Rīga, becoming an assistant of head coach Ramunas Butautas. He became head coach of BK Liepājas Lauvas in 2013.

== Player profile ==
At 2.04 m, Helmanis has been deployed in different roles throughout his career. Several coaches have attempted to use him primarily near the basket, although he has also often played away from the hoop. He is able to use his physical presence in the paint, particularly on defense, and his ability to shoot from the three-point range is one of his key strengths. He is not considered a particularly quick player, but he is able to create opportunities for himself from beyond the three-point line.
