= Gatis Jahovičs =

Latvian basketball player

VEF Rīga
- Title: President of Basketball

Personal information
- Born: August 11, 1984 (age 42) Riga, Latvian SSR, Soviet Union
- Listed height: 6 ft 7 in (2.01 m)
- Listed weight: 220 lb (100 kg)

Career information
- Playing career: 2001–2015
- Position: Small forward
- Number: 9, 3, 12, 25

Career history
- 2001–2004: BK Skonto
- 2004–2007: Anwil Wloclawek
- 2007–2009: ASK Rīga
- 2009–2014: VEF Rīga
- 2014–2015: Barons/LDz
- 2015: BK Liepājas Lauvas

Gatis Jahovičs (born August 11, 1984) is a Latvian former professional basketball player. He last played for BK Liepājas Lauvas in LBL. He is 2.00 m (6 ft 6.75 in) and a small forward.

== Latvian national team ==
Jahovičs is also a member of the Latvian national basketball team.
