= Kristaps Janičenoks =

Latvian basketball player (born 1983)

Personal information
- Born: 14 March 1983 (age 43) Riga, Latvian Soviet Socialist Republic, USSR
- Listed height: 6 ft 5 in (1.96 m)
- Listed weight: 205 lb (93 kg)

Career information
- Playing career: 1999–2019
- Position: Shooting guard / small forward
- Number: 12, 14

Career history
- 1999–2001: Brocēni/LMT
- 2001–2003: BK Skonto
- 2003–2004: Liège Euphony
- 2004–2005: Telekom Baskets Bonn
- 2005–2006: Upea Capo d'Orlando
- 2006: Climamio Bologna
- 2006–2007: Siviglia Wear Teramo
- 2007–2008: Upim Bologna
- 2008: Barons LMT
- 2008–2010: Reyer Venezia Mestre
- 2010–2014: VEF Rīga
- 2014–2017: BK Ventspils
- 2017–2019: VEF Rīga

Career highlights
- 4× LBL champion (2011–2013, 2019); LBL Playoffs MVP (2012); Belgian Cup (2004)

Kristaps Janičenoks (born 14 March 1983) is a retired Latvian professional basketball player who last played for VEF Rīga. He also played for the Latvian national basketball team.

== Playing career ==
Janičenoks first gained attention as a high-scoring teenager at the 1999 FIBA Europe Under-16 Championship. He was the second leading overall scorer at the tournament, averaging 23.5 points per game and was named to All-Tournament Team.

Shortly after, he started his career in Latvian Basketball League with Brocēni.

In 2001, after graduating from high school in Latvia, he received multiple offers from NCAA D1 schools, choosing George Washington as the place where he would play. However, NCAA ruled him ineligible because he had played with Brocēni in NEBL, which was considered as pro league. After one month in the US, he returned to Latvia in September and joined the newly founded BK Skonto, a successor to Brocēni.

In 2003, he went to play abroad, joining the Belgian side Liege Euphony.

In the following season, Janičenoks moved to the German Bundesliga team Telekom Baskets.

In 2005, he signed with Italian top division team Upea Capo d'Orlando. His first year in Italy turned out to be successful, and he moved to Climamio Bologna, who at the time was one of the strongest teams in Europe.

At the beginning of the 2006–07 season, Kristaps debuted in Euroleague. Later in the season, he was loaned from Bologna to Teramo Basket. Janičenoks averaged 12.4 points on 40.1% three-point shooting for Teramo. After one season, Janičenoks returned to Bologna, but it wasn't a year that he would have expected.

After a 2007–08 season in which he averaged a full season career low of 23 minutes and 8.4 points per game with Upim Bologna of the Italian League, he spent 2008–09 with Reyer Venezia Mestre of the Italian second-tier LegADue. He returned to form in 2008–09 as one of the second-tier league's top scorers, averaging 18.1 points per game over 19 games.

In 2010, after several years abroad, he moved back to Latvia and signed with VEF Rīga. On 7 December 2010 Janičenoks scored 32 points in a win over Cajasol Sevilla, helping VEF Riga to get its first-ever victory in the Eurocup competition. As captain of the team, he led VEF to its first-ever LBL championship and BBL finals appearance.

In 2012, Janičenoks helped VEF repeat as LBL winners while leading the team to its first Eurocup Last 16 appearance.

His most successful season with VEF Riga was the 2012–13 campaign when he was a vital part of a squad that made noise in the entire Europe with some big wins. At the end of the season, VEF won its third straight LBL title.

On 22 November 2014 Janičenoks signed with BK Ventspils.

== Latvian national team ==
Janičenoks is a member of the Latvia national basketball team. He has participated at EuroBasket 2005, EuroBasket 2007, EuroBasket 2009 and EuroBasket 2013.

At qualification for EuroBasket 2009, he hit a buzzer-beating three-pointer to beat Macedonia in the first group game to help lead the team to eventual qualification for the championships.

He also hit a game-winning shot at EuroBasket 2013 against Montenegro.
