= Eduards Andersons =

Latvian basketball player (1914–1985)

Personal information
- Born: 1 April 1914 Rīga, Governorate of Livonia, Russian Empire
- Died: 29 November 1985 (aged 71) Rīga, Latvian SSR

Career information
- College: University of Latvia
- Playing career: 1930–1940s
- Position: Defender

Career history
- Universitātes Sports
Medals
Men's basketball
Representing Latvia
EuroBasket
Gold medal – first place	1935 Switzerland	National Team
International University Games
Gold medal – first place	1935 International University Games	National Team
Gold medal – first place	1937 International University Games	National Team
Silver medal – second place	1933 International University Games	National Team

Eduards Andersons (1 April 1914 – 29 November 1985) was a Latvian basketball player. Andersons won a gold medal at the 1935 EuroBasket competition, becoming the first European champion. He participated also at the 1936 Summer Olympics and at the 1937 EuroBasket.

== Career ==
Andersons was born in Riga then part of Russian Empire. He graduated Riga State Gymnasium No.1 and started law studies at the University of Latvia in 1932. Andersons played basketball since 1930. Since 1933 he played for the university team Universitātes Sports and became a four time Latvian champion (1934-1937). He also participated in 1933 International University Games where the Latvian team won the silver medal and in University games in 1935 and 1937 where Latvia won gold. He was member of a latvian student fraternity Selonija.

Overall Andersons played sixteen games for the Latvian national basketball team. In 1938 Andersons became chief of the sport department of the Presidium Convent. Under the Nazi occupation of Latvia during World War II, Andersons briefly (1943–1944) became chairman of the Latvia Basketball Association. Andersons was arrested in 1945 and sent to a Gulag camp in Siberia. He was released in 1956 and returned to Latvia. For the rest of his life he worked in the administration of trams and trolleys in Riga. He died on 29 November 1985.
