= Sandis Valters =

Latvian basketball player (born 1978)

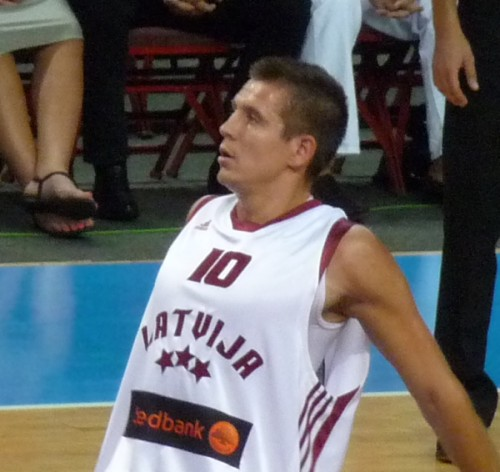

Personal information
- Born: 31 August 1978 (age 48) Riga, Latvian SSR, Soviet Union
- Listed height: 6 ft 4 in (1.93 m)
- Listed weight: 200 lb (91 kg)

Career information
- Playing career: 1994–2014
- Position: Shooting guard
- Number: 00, 10

Career history
- 1994–2001: BK Brocēni
- 2001–2003: BK Skonto
- 2003–2004: TBB Trier
- 2004–2005: TSK Wuerzburg
- 2005: BC Azovmash
- 2005–2009: ASK Rīga
- 2009: Andrea Costa Imola
- 2010–2012: VEF Rīga
- 2012–2014: BK Ventspils

Career highlights
- 9x Latvian Champion (1995–1999, 2007, 2011, 2012, 2014); 2x Latvian Basketball League Playoffs MVP (2007, 2011); 1x Baltic Basketball League Champion (2013); 7x Latvian Basketball All-Star Game (1998, 2000, 2006, 2007, 2008, 2010, 2011)

Sandis Valters (born 31 August 1978) is a retired professional basketball shooting guard, who last played for BK Ventspils. He is member of Latvia national basketball team. His father is a former Soviet basketball star, Valdis Valters, and his younger brother, Kristaps Valters, also plays professional basketball.

== Professional career ==
He first played professionally in 1994, for BK Brocēni, where he won his first five Latvian league titles. In 2001, after Brocēni ceased to exist and Valters moved to their successor BK Skonto, spending the next two seasons.

In 2003, Valters signed with Germany's team TBB Trier. For the following season he joined DJK Würzburg, another team from Basketball Bundesliga, however, during the season he moved to Ukraine to play for BC Azovmash.

For the 2005–06 season Valters had offers from Greece, Israel and Russia, but instead opted for a return to Riga, signing a contract with then up-and-coming team ASK Rīga. Valters also served as the captain of the team.

His best season with ASK was in 2006–07 as he led his squad to the Latvian league title, while Valters was named finals most valuable player. During the season Valters was selected in every tournament's All-Star game (LBL, BBL and FIBA EuroCup) that his club participated in.

In July 2008 Lithuanian powerhouse BC Lietuvos Rytas desired to sign Valters, but ASK refused to let him go.

In early 2009, Valters left ASK as the club went through financial problems, signing for the remainder of the season with the Italian team from Imola.

An injury during the Eurobasket 2009 preparation game with Latvian national team forced Valters to miss the first half of the 2009–10 season. In January 2010 he signed with VEF Rīga, where he played for the next two and a half seasons, winning two Latvian league championships. He was named as most valuable player of the finals once with VEF.

On 19 September 2012, Valters signed a two-year contract with BK Ventspils. In his first season with Ventspils, he helped to win the Baltic Basketball League championship. At the end of the 2013–14 season, Valters won his 9th Latvian League championship.

== International career ==
Valters was a regular member of the Latvia national basketball team and has played in two EuroBasket (2005 and 2007) tournaments. One of his most memorable games with the national team was in 2005 against Spain, when he erupted for 28 points, hitting six three-pointers, including buzzer beating three-pointer at the end of regulation.
