= Aleksejs Anufrijevs =

Latvian basketball player (1912–1945)

Personal information
- Born: 15 January 1912 Riga, Governorate of Livonia, Russian Empire
- Died: April 1945 Courland Pocket, Latvian SSR

Career information
- Playing career: 1929–early 1940s
- Position: Forward

Career history
- Riga Starts
Medals
Men's basketball
Representing Latvia
EuroBasket
Gold medal – first place	1935 Switzerland	National Team

Aleksejs Anufrijevs (Russian: Алексей Никитич Ануфриев; 15 January 1912 – April 1945) was a Latvian basketball player of Russian origin. Anufrijevs won a gold medal at the 1935 EuroBasket competition, becoming the first European champion. He also participated (as a substitute) at the 1936 Summer Olympics and at the 1937 EuroBasket.

== Background ==
Anufrijevs was born in Riga and all his playing career played for two Riga basketball clubs. He played for team LVKA (1929–1934) and later for Riga Starts (1935–1939). He became Latvian champion with both teams (1933 and 1938). In 1936 he was awarded as the season's best player for Riga Starts team. During Nazi occupation of Latvia Anufrijevs briefly returned into the rooster of Starts team during season of 1942–43.

Overall Anufrijevs played 15 games for the Latvian national basketball team. When soviets occupied Latvia for the second time in autumn 1944 Anufrijevs was conscripted by Soviet Red Army. He saw action in Courland Pocket and went missing in April 1945.

== See also ==
- List of people who disappeared
