= Visvaldis Melderis =

Latvian basketball player (1915–1944)

Personal information
- Born: 19 January 1915 Jelgava, Russian Empire
- Died: 14 July 1944 (aged 29) Near Opochka, Pskov Oblast, USSR

Career information
- Playing career: 1930s–1943
- Position: Centre

Career history
- Rīgas ASK
Medals
Men's basketball
Representing Latvia
EuroBasket
| Gold medal – first place | 1935 Switzerland | National Team |
| Silver medal – second place | 1939 Lithuania | National Team |

Visvaldis Melderis (19 January 1915 – 14 July 1944) was a Latvian basketball player. Melderis won a gold medal at the 1935 EuroBasket competition, becoming the first European champion. He participated also at the 1936 Summer Olympics and at the 1937 EuroBasket and EuroBasket 1939.

== Career ==
Visvaldis Melderis was born on 19 January 1915 in Jelgava. He graduated Jelgava 2nd. gymnasium and was drafted into Latvian Army. While in the army he started to play basketball for army team Rīgas ASK. He twice became Latvian champion with Rīgas ASK (1939, 1940). He was a captain of Latvian national basketball team from 1938 until 1940. He continued to play basketball during period of Nazi occupation and became Latvian champion for the third time in 1942 playing for RDKA team. Overall he played 40 games in the national basketball team. He also tried other sports like football and track and field. In the Latvian track and field championship in 1934 he won bronze medal in Shot put.

As a former corporal of Latvian Army Melderis was conscripted into Latvian Legion in 1943 and deployed to Eastern front as a part of the 19th Waffen Grenadier Division of the SS (2nd Latvian). He took part in many battles and was killed in action during defensive battles near Latvian border around Opochka, Pskov Oblast.
