= Džems Raudziņš =

Latvian basketball player

Personal information
- Born: 1 December 1910 Harbin, Manchuria
- Died: 13 December 1979 (aged 69) Perth, Australia

Career information
- College: University of Latvia
- Playing career: 1920s–1940s
Medals
Men's basketball
Representing Latvia
EuroBasket
Gold medal – first place	1935 Switzerland	National Team

Džems Raudziņš (1 December 1910 – 13 December 1979) was a Latvian basketball player. Raudziņš won a gold medal at the 1935 EuroBasket competition, becoming the first European champion. He participated also at the 1936 Summer Olympics and at the 1937 EuroBasket.

== Career ==
Raudziņš was born in Harbin, Manchuria where during the first half of the 20th century a notable Latvian community existed. After the First World War his family returned to Latvia. Raudziņš studied law at the University of Latvia and besides basketball worked at the Latvian Ministry of Interior in the 1930s.

Raudziņš played basketball since late 1920s. He played most of his career for the university team Universitātes Sports and became a five time Latvian champion (1930; 1934–1937). He also participated in 1933 International University Games where the Latvian team won the silver medal and in University games in 1935 where Latvia won gold.

Overall Raudziņš played eighteen games for the Latvian national team. In 1944, Raudziņš immigrated to Germany and later to Australia where he settled in Perth under the name James along with his wife Erna and 4 children, and worked as an accountant. He became the 1971 WA State Chess Champion. He died in Perth on 13 December 1979. His daughter Ilze Raudziņš played basketball for the Western Australian team in the Australian championship.
