= Kārlis Muižnieks =

Latvian basketball player

Personal information
- Born: March 17, 1964 (age 62) Riga, Latvian SSR, Soviet Union

Career information
- Playing career: 1986–1999
- Coaching career: 1999–present

Career history

Playing
- 1986–1988: VEF Rīga
- 1988–1989: CSKA Moscow
- 1989–1990: VEF Rīga
- 1990: Erie Wave
- 1990–1993: Brocēni
- 1993–1994: Maccabi Haifa
- 1994–1995: Brocēni
- 1996–1997: Donetsk
- 1997: Liepāja Baltika
- 1997–1999: Ventspils

Coaching
- 1999–2001: Ventspils (assistant)
- 2001–2007: Ventspils
- 2007–2008: Barons/LMT
- 2009–2012: Trefl Sopot
- 2012–2013: Kryvbasbasket
- 2013–2015: Khimik
- 2015–2017: Ventspils
- 2019–2020: Prometey Kamianske

Career highlights
- As player: 3x Latvian League champion (1992, 1993, 1995); As a coach: Ukrainian SuperLeague champion (2015); Polish League Best Coach (2012); 2x Polish Cup winner (2012); FIBA EuroCup champion (2008); 6x Latvian League champion (2002–2006, 2008)

Kārlis Muižnieks (born March 17, 1964, in Riga, Latvian SSR, Soviet Union) is a Latvian professional basketball coach and former player. He was most recently the head coach of Prometey Kamianske of the Ukrainian SuperLeague.

== Coaching career ==
Muižnieks had solid career as player, which is followed by prolific coaching career. As head coach Muižnieks has led his teams to multiple championships, winning titles in domestic and international competitions. So far he has been most successful in Latvia, where he has guided his teams to six Latvian League titles (2002, 2003, 2004, 2005, 2006, 2008). First success in European club tournaments Muižnieks had with BK Ventspils, where in 2002/2003 his squad he finished third in FIBA Europe Champions Cup, where in bronze medal game they upset KK Hemofarm and their up-and-coming star Darko Milicic. Later, in 2004/2005, Muižnieks led Ventspils to ULEB Cup quarterfinals in 2004/2005. Few years later in 2007/2008, his Barons/LMT won FIBA EuroCup title.

In 2011/2012, as coach of Polish side Trefl Sopot, he was named as the Coach of the Year in Poland. Under coach Muižnieks Trefl Sopot won Polish Cup and for the first time made league finals, where they lost only in Game 7 to Asseco Prokom. Success under Muižnieks in Polish league clinched EuroCup berth for Trefl Sopot.

In summer 2012, Muižnieks moved to Ukraine and joined BC Khimik. Muižnieks' squad had a strong season as Khimik made Eurocup quarterfinals for the first time in club history and reached finals of Ukrainian League. On May 6, 2015, Muižnieks finished season with Ukrainian championship and perfect record for Khimik, 36–0.

Muižnieks was also Latvian National Team head coach from 2004 to 2008.

== Personal ==
He is the nephew of Latvian basketball legend Valdis Muižnieks.
