= Alfrēds Krauklis =

Latvian basketball player and coach

Personal information
- Born: December 8, 1911 Jumprava, Lielvārde Municipality, Latvia
- Died: November 20, 1991 (aged 79) Riga, Latvia
Medal record
Representing Latvia
Men's basketball
European Championships
| Silver medal – second place | 1939 Lithuania | Team competition |

Alfrēds Krauklis (8 December 1911, Jumprava – 20 November 1991, Riga) was a former Latvian basketball player and coach, one of the leaders of the Latvian national basketball team in the 1930s, and winner of the silver medal in FIBA EuroBasket 1939. Once he stopped playing, he became a coach and sports event organizer.

== Player ==
Krauklis played in 28 games as the captain of the Latvian national team that won a silver medal in FIBA EuroBasket 1939 (in Kaunas, Lithuania). After World War II and the start of the second Soviet occupation of Latvia he played on the team of the Latvian SSR (1945–1949). Beginning from 1940, he worked as a player-coach. As a member of BK Rīga Starts (1933, 1938, 1943, 1944) and BK Daugava (1945–1948), he became the champion of Latvia 8 times.

In a 1990s interview, Krauklis said: "Frankly saying – these three Baltic states raised the European basketball. Now they say that its Spanish, and so what? Let them say... And I say – it's our merit!".

== Coach ==
From 1949 to 1958 Krauklis organized and managed BK Rīga "Spartaks" (in 1953 for a short period of time he was managing BK Rīga ASK). In 1958 on the basis of team BK Rīga Spartaks he formed the professional team BK VEF Rīga, with which he was connected until 1975. As the head coach of BK VEF Rīga, he won bronze medals in the USSR Championship in 1960. He coached the Latvian SSR team (20 games) and won medals at the Spartakiades of Peoples of the USSR. He was received the honor of Meritorious Coach of the USSR.

He also worked in Latvian youth basketball for 25 years, coaching the VEF Rīga junior team and a youth sports school. The sports school was later named after him. It annually holds an international basketball tournament for youth, the Alfrēds Krauklis Memorial Tournament in Riga.

== Other sources ==
- "TRENERI / Latvijas basketbola Goda zāle". Godazale.basket.lv. Archived from the original on 2014-09-20.
