= Kaspars Bērziņš =

Latvian basketball player

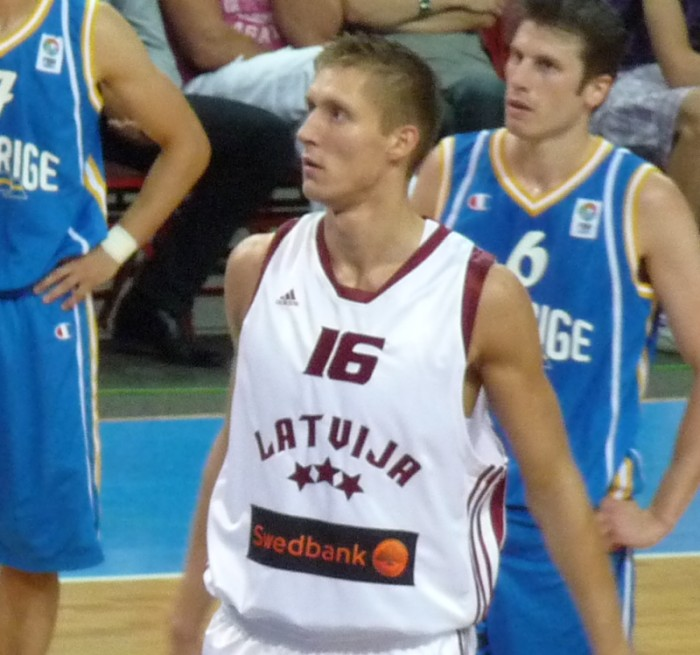
- Bērziņš with Latvian national team in 2009

BK Ogre
- Position: Power forward / center
- League: LEBL

Personal information
- Born: 25 August 1985 (age 41) Ogre, Latvian SSR, Soviet Union
- Listed height: 7 ft 0 in (2.13 m)
- Listed weight: 225 lb (102 kg)

Career information
- NBA draft: 2007: undrafted
- Playing career: 2003–present

Career history
- 2003–2004: BK Skonto
- 2004–2005: Unicaja Málaga
- 2005–2006: ASK Riga
- 2006–2009: Barons LMT
- 2009–2010: Baloncesto Fuenlabrada
- 2010: Cáceres
- 2010–2014: VEF Rīga
- 2014: Río Natura Monbús
- 2014–2015: Krasnye Krylia
- 2015–2016: Nizhny Novgorod
- 2016: Zenit Saint Petersburg
- 2016–2017: Ogre/Kumho Tyre
- 2017: Lokomotiv Kuban
- 2017–2018: VEF Rīga
- 2018–2019: BK Ogre
- 2019: Saratov Avtodor
- 2019–2020: BK Ogre
- 2020–2021: BC Šiauliai
- 2021–2022: Lietkabelis Panevėžys
- 2022: Juventus Utena
- 2022–2023: SIG Strasbourg
- 2023: New Taipei CTBC DEA
- 2023: Rīgas Zeļļi
- 2023: Real Betis
- 2024–present: BK Ogre

Career highlights
- T1 League champion (2023); FIBA EuroCup winner (2008); 4× Latvian League champion (2008, 2011–2013)

Kaspars Bērziņš (born 25 August 1985) is a Latvian professional basketball player. He has also represented the senior Latvian national team.

== Professional career ==
Kaspars started playing basketball in his hometown of Ogre. Later, he played for Skonto Riga, debuting in the 2002–2003 season. His role increased in 2003–2004, when he averaged 7.3 points and 3.3 rebounds for Skonto in the LBL and 7.3 points and 3.0 rebounds in the FIBA Europe League, now known as the FIBA EuroCup. In both of those seasons, Bērziņš played together with Andris Biedriņš. In 2004, both of them left Skonto. Biedriņš was drafted in the NBA by the Golden State Warriors, while Bērziņš moved to Spain, where he joined Unicaja Málaga. He briefly played for Unicaja's first team, where he competed in one game in the ACB league, scoring two points, but most of his season was spent with the junior team in the EBA, Spain's second division.

For the 2004–2005 season, Bērziņš moved back to Latvia, playing a big role for Skonto. He averaged 13.0 points, 6.1 rebounds and 1.0 blocks in 21.3 minutes in the LBL and 14.8 points and 8.3 rebounds in four EuroCup Challenge games. After Skonto disappeared, Bērziņš moved to ASK Rīga, where he played the 2005–2006 season. In the following off-season, Bērziņš signed with Barons LMT, where he played the next three seasons and won his first Latvian league title in 2008. During that season, Bērziņš won the FIBA EuroCup as well. 2008–2009 was his best season with Barons, when he was the team's top inside presence for most of the season, averaging 14.0 points, 8.rebounds and 1.9 blocks in 28 games of domestic competition.

In July 2009, Bērziņš participated in the NBA Summer League, playing for the Phoenix Suns. After playing for Phoenix in the Summer League competition, Bērziņš signed a contract with Spain's ACB League club Fuenlabrada. Later, he also played for Cáceres Ciudad del Baloncesto, but in July 2010, he signed a two-year contract with VEF Rīga. He re-signed with VEF Rīga for three more years in 2012.

In February 2014, he went back to Spain and signed with Río Natura Monbús for the rest of the 2013–14 ACB season.

On 21 August 2014, Bērziņš signed with Russian club Krasnye Krylia for the 2014–15 season. On 16 June 2015, he signed with Nizhny Novgorod. In January 2016, he left Nizhny and signed with Zenit Saint Petersburg for the rest of the season. For the 2016–17 season, Bērziņš started with Latvian club Ogre/Kumho Tyre, but in January 2017 he returned to Russia and signed with Lokomotiv Kuban for the rest of the season.

On February 21, 2023, Bērziņš signed with New Taipei CTBC DEA of the T1 League.

== Latvia national team ==
Kaspars Bērziņš averaged 16.0 points, 10.0 rebounds and 1.1 blocks for Latvia at the 2005 FIBA Europe Under-20 Championship.

Bērziņš has been a regular member of the Latvia national team.
