= Mārtiņš Grundmanis =

Latvian basketball player (1913–1944)

Personal information
- Born: 18 November 1913
- Died: 30 November 1944 (aged 31) Rīga, Latvian SSR

Career information
- Playing career: early 1930s–early 1940s
- Position: Defender

Career history
- Rīgas ASK
Medals
Men's basketball
Representing Latvia
EuroBasket
Gold medal – first place	1935 Switzerland	National Team

Mārtiņš Grundmanis (18 November 1913 – 30 November 1944) was a Latvian basketball player. Grundmanis won a gold medal at the 1935 EuroBasket competition, becoming the first European champion. He also participated at the 1936 Summer Olympics and at the 1937 EuroBasket.

== Career ==
In the first half of the 1930s Grundmanis played for the JKS (Latvian Christian Youth) team. He was also a member of the Latvian Christian Youth Society, and graduated from a four-year physical education program at the University of Tartu. In late 1930s Grundmanis played for the military team Rīgas ASK, and became a two time Latvian champion (1939-1940).

Overall Grundmanis played 20 games for the Latvian national basketball team. During Nazi occupation of Latvia during World War II, Grundmanis was conscripted into Latvian Legion. He was taken prisoner of war by Soviet Red Army in 1944. He committed suicide on 30 November 1944 at the German POW camp in Sarkandaugava, Riga.
