= Mareks Mejeris =

Latvian basketball player (born 1991)

No. 5 – VEF Rīga
- Position: Small forward / power forward
- League: LBL; LEBL

Personal information
- Born: 2 September 1991 (age 35) Liepāja, Latvia
- Listed height: 2.07 m (6 ft 9 in)
- Listed weight: 95 kg (209 lb)

Career information
- Playing career: 2009–present

Career history
- 2009–2011: BK Liepājas Lauvas
- 2011–2013: CB Clavijo
- 2013–2014: Baloncesto Fuenlabrada
- 2014: →Ford Burgos (loan)
- 2014–2016: VEF Rīga
- 2016: Élan Chalon
- 2016–2019: VEF Rīga
- 2019–2022: Parma Basket
- 2022: Victoria Libertas Pesaro
- 2022–2023: Hapoel Jerusalem
- 2023–2025: U-BT Cluj-Napoca
- 2025–2026: Stal Ostrów Wielkopolski
- 2026–present: VEF Rīga

Career highlights
- 2x Romanian Liga Națională winner (2024, 2025); Romanian Cup winner (2024); Israeli State Cup winner (2023); 3x LBL champion (2015, 2017, 2019); 2x LBL Playoff MVP (2015, 2017); LBL Defensive Player Of The Year (2016)

Mareks Mejeris (born 2 September 1991) is a Latvian professional basketball player for Stal Ostrów Wielkopolski of the Polish Basketball League, who plays the power forward position.

== Professional career ==
He started his pro career in 2009 with his hometown team BK Liepājas Lauvas. After a couple of seasons in Liepāja, he moved to Spain. His first team abroad was CB Clavijo from LEB Gold, where he played for two seasons. After the 2012-13 season, Mejeris went to the United States for NBA pre-draft workouts, and although going undrafted, he performed well and earned feedback of being "two years from being NBA-ready".

In August 2013, he signed with Fuenlabrada of the Liga ACB. Mid-season, he was loaned to Ford Burgos, helping the team to win the LEB Gold playoffs and earn promotion to Liga ACB.

On July 15, 2014, he signed with VEF Rīga of the Latvian League. Mejeris finished the season strong by helping VEF Rīga win the LBL championship while being named the MVP of the LBL playoffs. In May 2017, Mejeris guided VEF to one more domestic championship, getting named Latvian League playoffs MVP once again.

On August 13, 2019, he signed with Parma Basket of the VTB United League. In 2019-20 he averaged 10.2 points, 6.8 rebounds, 0.8 steals, and 0.8 blocks per game. Playing for the team again in 2020-21, he averaged 9.0 points, 5.0 rebounds, 0.9 steals, and 0.9 blocks per game.

On March 9, 2022, he signed with Victoria Libertas Pesaro of the Italian Lega Basket Serie A (LBA).

On August 4, 2022, he signed with Hapoel Jerusalem of the Israeli Premier League. On Hapoel Jerusalem, Mejeris was considered one of the team's best defenders. Mejeris was a significant member of the team that reached the Basketball Champions League finals, doing anything the coach requested, and always with a positive attitude.

On July 25, 2023, he signed with Romanian team U-BT Cluj-Napoca.

== National team career ==
He represented Latvia national team in EuroBasket 2011, EuroBasket 2013, EuroBasket 2015 and EuroBasket 2025.
