= Latvian Basketball Association =

Sports governing body in Latvia

Latvijas Basketbola Savienība
- Sport: Basketball
- Founded: 1923; 103 years ago
- President: Raimonds Vējonis
- Country: Latvia
- Headquarters: Riga
- Continent: FIBA Europe
- Website: basket.lv

The Latvian Basketball Association (Latvian: Latvijas Basketbola Savienība), also known as LBS, is the national governing body of basketball in Latvia. It was founded in 1923 and was one of the FIBA Europe co-founders, but due to the Soviet and Nazi occupations, the federation disappeared from FIBA from 1940 to 1991. Its headquarters are located in Riga.

== Tournaments organized ==
Latvian Basketball Association is recognized as one of the best international tournament organizers for FIBA. Latvia has organized EuroBasket 1937, EuroBasket Women 2009, EuroBasket 2015, EuroBasket Women 2019 and will organize EuroBasket 2025. Also, Latvia has been a host for 2011 FIBA Under-19 World Championship, 2021 FIBA Under-19 Basketball World Cup and a number of other youth competitions in all age groups. In June 2019, Latvian Basketball Association, in cooperation with NBA and FIBA hosted Basketball Without Borders Europe Camp in Riga.

== Local tournaments organized ==
- Latvian-Estonian Basketball League
- Latvian Basketball League
- Latvian National Basketball League
- Latvian Regional Basketball League
- Latvian Women's Basketball League
- Latvian Basketball Cup
- LBS Open 3x3 Basketball League
- Latvian E-Basketball League
- Latvian Youth Basketball League

== Presidents ==
- Fricis Ķergalvis (1923–1925)
- Roberts Plūme (1925–1935)
- Alfrēds Ivanovskis (1935–1936)
- Eduards Ceplītis (1936–1937)
- Eduards Lapiņš (1937–1940)
- Edgars Ošiņš (1940–1941)
- Osvalds Porietis (1942–1943)
- Eduards Andersons (1943–1944)
- Jānis Augusts (1944–1945)
- Augusts Raubens (1945–1946)
- Edgars Ošiņš (1946–1949)
- Arnolds Brambergs (1949–1950)
- Viesturs Baldzēns (1950–1951)
- Ādolfs Runcis (1951–1956)
- Miervaldis Ramāns (1956–1971)
- Artūrs Punenovs (1971–1989)
- Uldis Grāvītis (1989–1992)
- Indulis Ozols (1992–1997)
- Ojārs Kehris (1997–2011)
- Valdis Voins (2011–2020)
- Raimonds Vējonis (2020–Present)

(Presidents during the occupation of Latvia marked in italics)

== See also ==
- Latvia national basketball team
- Latvia national women's basketball team
- Latvia men's national 3x3 team
