= Maksis Kazāks =

Latvian basketball player

Personal information
- Nationality: Latvian
- Born: 10 May 1912; Riga, Latvia
- Died: 19 June 1983 (aged 71); Toronto, Ontario, Canada

Sport
- Sport: Basketball

Maksis Kazāks (10 May 1912 – 19 June 1983) was a Latvian basketball player. He competed in the men's tournament at the 1936 Summer Olympics. He also participated in EuroBasket 1939, where Latvia won the silver medal.
