= ASK/Brocēni/LMT =

Latvian basketball club

BK Brocēni
- Nickname: Broči
- Leagues: LBL; NEBL; Saporta Cup
- Founded: 1992
- Dissolved: 2001
- History: Brocēni/Parair; 1992; BK Brocēni; 1992–1993; SWH/Brocēni; 1993-1995; ASK/Brocēni; 1995–1996; ASK/Brocēni/LMT; 1996–1998; Brocēni/LMT; 1996–1998; BK LMT; 2000–2001
- Arena: Rīgas Sporta Pils (capacity: 5,500)
- Location: Riga, Latvia

ASK/Brocēni/LMT was a professional basketball team that was located in Riga, Latvia that existed from 1992 to 2001. For most of its duration it was named after its main sponsor, the Brocēni Cement and Roofing Slate Factory.

The club played in the Latvian Basketball League, winning eight consecutive titles from 1992 till 1999. Brocēni also were regular participants in European club competitions. After the 2000-2001 season, when the team played as BK LMT, the team disappeared and soon after their place in Latvian league was taken by BK Skonto, although both teams are not related.

== Honours ==
=== League ===
- Latvian League:

Winners (8): 1992, 1993, 1994, 1995, 1996, 1997, 1998, 1999

Runners-up (2): 2000, 2001

- NEBL

Winners (0):

Runners-up (1): 1999

== Season by season ==
Season	League	Pos.	European competitions		Regional competitions	
1992	LBL	1st				
1992–93	LBL	1st	2 European Cup	QF		
1993–94	LBL	1st	2 European Cup	3R		
1994–95	LBL	1st	2 European Cup	QF		
1995–96	LBL	1st				
1996–97	LBL	1st	2 European Cup	R16		
1997–98	LBL	1st	2 European Cup	GS		
1998–99	LBL	1st	2 European Cup	R32	NEBL	2nd
1999–00	LBL	2nd			NEBL	1/8
2000–01	LBL	2nd			NEBL	1/8

== Players ==
=== FIBA Hall of Famers ===
ASK/Brocēni/LMT Hall of Famers
Players
No.	Nat.	Name	Position	Tenure	Inducted
10	(Latvia)	Valdis Valters	G	1992–1997	2015

=== Notable players ===
Note: Flags indicate national team eligibility at FIBA-sanctioned events. Players may hold other non-FIBA nationalities not displayed.

Criteria

To appear in this section a player must have either:

- Set a club record or won an individual award while at the club
- Played at least one official international match for their national team at any time
- Played at least one official NBA match at any time.

- Jānis Āzacis
- Ainars Bagatskis
- Andrejs Bondarenko
- Agris Galvanovskis
- Raitis Grafs
- Andris Jēkabsons
- Ivars Liepa
- Igors Meļņiks
- Raimonds Miglinieks
- Kārlis Muižnieks
- Kristaps Purnis
- Edgars Šneps
- Roberts Štelmahers
- Juris Umbraško
- Edmunds Valeiko
- Kristaps Valters
- Sandis Valters
- Valdis Valters
- Arnis Vecvagars
- Gundars Vētra
- Aigars Zeidaks
- James Dockery
- Fred Ferguson
- J.R. Holden
- Antoine Hyman
- Vincent Knowles
- Dan Kreft
- Eldar Gadashev
- Charles Newborn
- Yohance Nicholas
- Marcus Timmons
- Rauno Pehka

== Head coaches ==
- (Latvia) Nikolajs Balvačovs
- (Latvia) Armands Krauliņš
- (Latvia) Valdis Valters
- (Latvia) Jānis Zeltiņš
