= Armands Krauliņš =

Latvian basketball coach (1939–2022)

Personal information
- Born: August 16, 1939 Kandava, Latvia
- Died: July 1, 2022 (aged 82)
- Coaching career: 1961–2014

Armands Krauliņš (August 16, 1939 - July 1, 2022) was a Latvian basketball coach and Order of the Three Stars recipient.
