= Arnis Vecvagars =

Latvian basketball player and coach

Free Agent
- Title: Head coach

Personal information
- Born: April 12, 1974 (age 52) Riga, Latvian SSR, Soviet Union
- Listed height: 6 ft 7 in (2.01 m)

Career information
- Playing career: 1991–2008
- Position: Forward
- Number: 15
- Coaching career: 2010–present

Career history

Coaching
- 2012–2014: BA Turība
- 2014–2017: BK Jūrmala/Fēnikss
- 2017: Latvia (assistant)
- 2017–2019: Latvia
- 2018–2022: BC Barsy Atyrau
- 2022–2024: Bertanu Valmieras basketbola skola

Career highlights
- As player: 7× Latvian champion (1997, 1998, 1999, 2003, 2004, 2005, 2007)

Arnis Vecvagars (April 12, 1974) is a Latvian former basketball player, and former coach of the Latvian national basketball team. He is the father of Latvian basketball player Kaspars Vecvagars.

== Playing career ==
Arnis Vecvagars spent most of his career playing in LBL with ASK/Brocēni/LMT, BK Ventspils and ASK Riga as the most notable teams. Vecvagars won seven LBL titles: Brocēni (1997–1999), BK Ventspils (2003–2005), ASK Rīga (2007).

For couple of seasons he went abroad playing for Austrian team UKJ SÜBA St. Pölten and Polish side Ericsson Bobry.

He represented Latvian National Team at EuroBasket 2001 and EuroBasket 2003.

== Coaching career ==
Vecvagars made his head coaching debut in 2012 with BA Turība of Latvian Basketball League. On July 17, 2014, Vecvagars was named head coach of BK Jūrmala.

In 2014, Vecvagars was head coach Latvian U18 National Team. Since 2012, he also worked as an assistant coach to senior Latvian National Team. On 27 September, Vecvagars was named the new head coach of the Latvian National Team. His contract ended on 28 March 2019 and was not extended, releasing him of national team duties.

In October 2022, A. Vecvagars was appointed head coach of the Valmiera Glass Via, a club in the Latvian National Basketball League (LBL2).
