= EuroBasket 2015 final =

EuroBasket 2015 Final
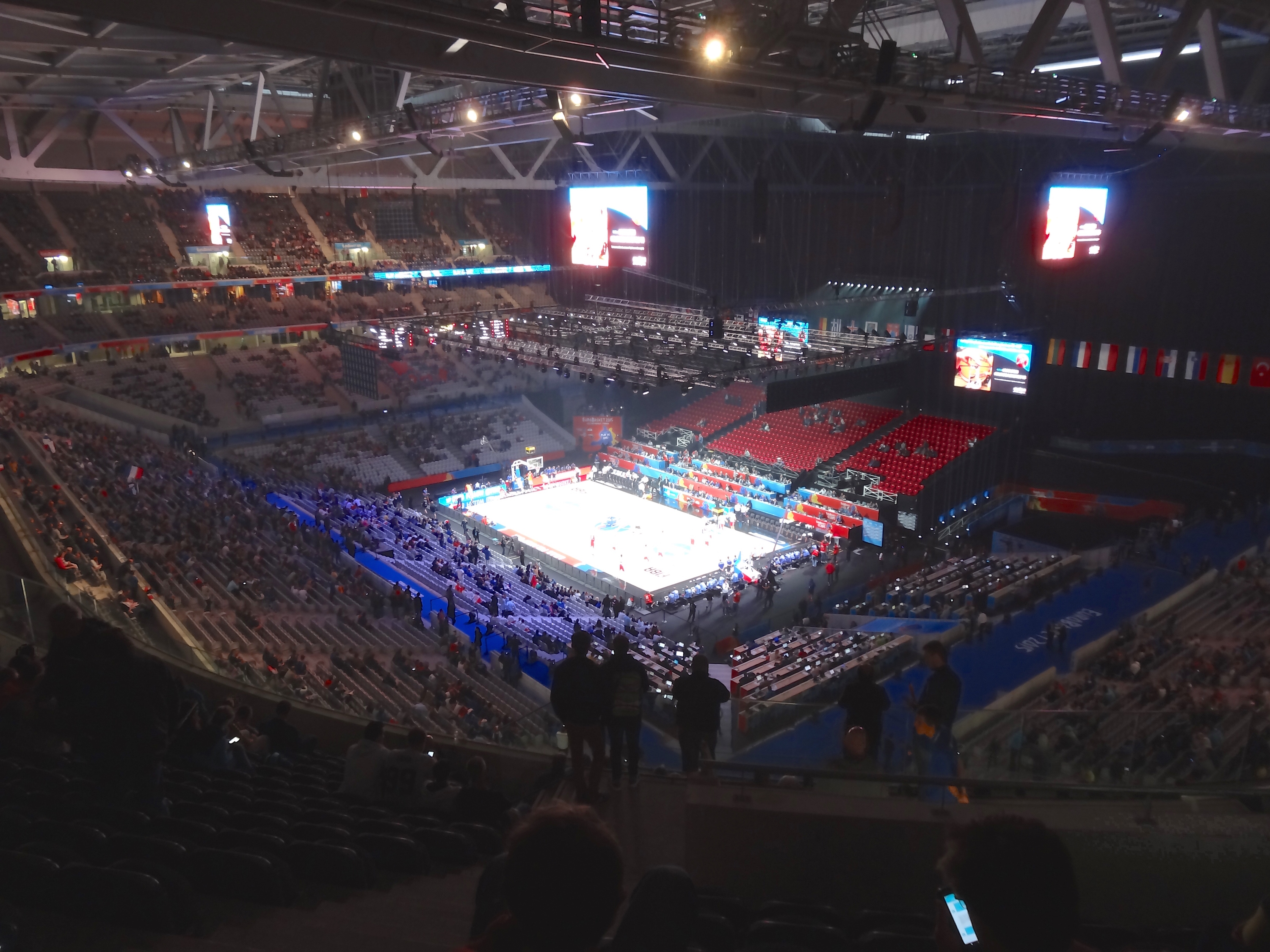
- The Stade Pierre-Mauroy was the venue of the Final
- Event: EuroBasket 2015
Spain	Lithuania
(Spain)	(Lithuania)
80	63
	1	2	3	4	Total
Spain	19	22	19	20	80
Lithuania	8	25	10	20	63
- Date: 20 September 2015
- Venue: Stade Pierre-Mauroy, Lille
- Referees: Luigi Lamonica; Ilija Belošević; Borys Ryzhyk
- Attendance: 27,372

The EuroBasket 2015 Final was the championship game of the EuroBasket 2015 tournament. The game was played on 20 September 2015 at the Stade Pierre-Mauroy in Lille, France.

Spain won their third title by defeating Lithuania 80–63. The attendance of 27,372 was an all-time record. Both teams qualified for the 2016 Summer Olympics.

== Road to the Final ==
=== Spain ===
The team of Spain for EuroBasket 2015 missed Serge Ibaka, Marc Gasol and José Calderón, compared to the squad that participated at the 2014 FIBA Basketball World Cup. Pau Gasol did play for the team, as well as Nikola Mirotić, who made his debut with the Spanish national team.

Spain started slow at the tournament, during the group stage in Berlin. Spain lost to Serbia and Italy, and had to battle on the last day with Germany to eventually advance to the Round of 16. In the quarterfinals Greece, who were considered major tournament contenders, was defeated 73–71. In the semi-final Spain faced host country France, who knocked Spain out of the tournament at the 2010 World Cup. Behind 40 points from Pau Gasol, the Spanish put the French away after overtime.

=== Lithuania ===
Top players Linas Kleiza and Donatas Motiejūnas missed from the squad that participated 2014 FIBA Basketball World Cup. Lithuania played the group stage in Riga, Latvia. Their only loss came against Belgium, who won 74–76 on a buzzer-beater. In the Round of 16 Lithuania had its hands full with Georgia, but won 85–81 behind 34 points of Jonas Mačiulis. In the quarterfinals, they beat Italy after overtime. In the semifinals, they surprised favourite Serbia 67–64.

=== All results ===
Spain		Round	Lithuania	
Opponent	Result		Opponent	Result
Serbia	70–80	Game 1	Ukraine	69–68
Turkey	104–77	Game 2	Latvia	68–49
Italy	98–105	Game 3	Belgium	74–76
Iceland	99–73	Game 4	Estonia	64–62
Germany	77–76	Game 5	Czech Republic	85–81 (OT)
Pos / Team / Pld / W / L / PF / PA / PD / Pts / Qualification; 1 / Serbia / 5 / 5 / 0 / 433 / 354 / +79 / 10 / Advanced to Knockout stage; 2 / Spain / 5 / 3 / 2 / 448 / 411 / +37 / 8 (Note: Spain 1–1, +20; Italy 1–1, +5; Turkey 1–1 −25) / Advanced to Knockout stage; 3 / Italy / 5 / 3 / 2 / 434 / 434 / 0 / 8 / Advanced to Knockout stage; 4 / Turkey / 5 / 3 / 2 / 429 / 459 / −30 / 8 / Advanced to Knockout stage; 5 / Germany / 5 / 1 / 4 / 370 / 379 / −9 / 6; 6 / Iceland / 5 / 0 / 5 / 368 / 445 / −77 / 5; Source: eurobasket2015.org Rules for classification: 1) Points; 2) Head-to-head results; 3) Points difference; 4) Points scored. Notes:		Preliminary Round	Pos / Team / Pld / W / L / PF / PA / PD / Pts / Qualification; 1 / Lithuania / 5 / 4 / 1 / 360 / 336 / +24 / 9 / Advanced to Knockout stage; 2 / Latvia / 5 / 3 / 2 / 348 / 339 / +9 / 8 (Note: Latvia 2–0; Czech Republic 1–1; Belgium 0–2) / Advanced to Knockout stage; 3 / Czech Republic / 5 / 3 / 2 / 370 / 342 / +28 / 8 / Advanced to Knockout stage; 4 / Belgium / 5 / 3 / 2 / 370 / 344 / +26 / 8 / Advanced to Knockout stage; 5 / Estonia / 5 / 1 / 4 / 316 / 374 / −58 / 6 (Note: Ukraine–Estonia 71–78); 6 / Ukraine / 5 / 1 / 4 / 349 / 378 / −29 / 6; Source: eurobasket2015.org Rules for classification: 1) Points; 2) Head-to-head results; 3) Points difference; 4) Points scored. Notes:	
Opponent	Result	Knockout stage	Opponent	Result
Poland	80–66	Round of 16	Georgia	85–81
Greece	73–71	Quarterfinals	Italy	95–85 (OT)
France	80–75 (OT)	Semifinals	Serbia	67–64

== Match ==
The game was a re-match of the EuroBasket 2003 final, in which Lithuania beat Spain 93–84.

Spain pulled away early, by taking a 19–8 lead after the first quarter. Lithuania won the second quarter, behind a buzzer-beating three pointer by Jonas Mačiulis. After the third quarter, Spain led by 17 points.

After the game, Spain's Pau Gasol was named the Most Valuable Player of the tournament. Lithuanians Jonas Valančiūnas and Mačiulis were named to the All-Tournament Team along with Gasol and Sergio Rodríguez.

20 September 2015
19:00

Boxscore

Spain	80–63	Lithuania
Scoring by quarter: 19–8, 22–25, 19–10, 20–20
Pts: Gasol 25; Rebs: Gasol 12; Asts: Rodríguez 6		Pts: Kalnietis, Seibutis 13; Rebs: Valančiūnas 9 Asts: Kalnietis 5

Stade Pierre-Mauroy, Lille
Attendance: 27,372
Referees: Luigi Lamonica (Italy), Ilija Belošević (Serbia), Borys Ryzhyk (Ukraine)

Spain	Lithuania

Starters:			Pts	Reb	Ast
PG	12	Sergio Llull	12	6	5
SG	8	Pau Ribas	5	1	0
SF	5	Rudy Fernández	11	1	1
PF	14	Nikola Mirotić	8	2	2
C	4	Pau Gasol	25	12	4
Reserves:					
PG	6	Sergio Rodríguez	4	2	6
C	7	Willy Hernangómez	0	0	0
PF	9	Felipe Reyes	8	1	1
F	10	Víctor Claver	7	6	0
SF	11	Fernando San Emeterio	0	1	0
PF	13	Pablo Aguilar	0	0	0
PG	15	Guillem Vives	0	1	0
Head coach:
(Italian Basketball Federation) Sergio Scariolo

2015 European champions

Spain
3rd title

Starters:			Pts	Reb	Ast
PG	5	Mantas Kalnietis	13	1	6
SG	10	Renaldas Seibutis	13	4	0
SF	8	Jonas Mačiulis	8	4	2
PF	13	Paulius Jankūnas	3	4	0
C	17	Jonas Valančiūnas	10	9	2
Reserves:					
G/F	6	Deividas Gailius	1	0	0
F/C	11	Domantas Sabonis	0	0	0
C	12	Antanas Kavaliauskas	4	5	0
C	15	Robertas Javtokas	0	0	0
SF	19	Mindaugas Kuzminskas	8	6	2
SG	21	Artūras Milaknis	3	0	0
PG	43	Lukas Lekavičius	0	0	2
Head coach:
(Lithuanian Basketball Federation) Jonas Kazlauskas

Note: For full information about the squads, see EuroBasket 2015 squads.
