= EuroBasket 2015 Group A =

Group A of the EuroBasket 2015 took place between 5 and 10 September 2015. The group played all of its games at Park&Suites Arena in Montpellier, France.

The group is composed of Bosnia and Herzegovina, Finland, France, Israel, Poland and Russia. The four best ranked teams advanced to the second round.

== Standings ==
Pos	Team	Pld	W	L	PF	PA	PD	Pts	Qualification
1	France	5	5	0	407	335	+72	10	Advanced to Knockout stage
2	Israel	5	3	2	375	384	−9	8 (Note: Poland–Israel 73–75)	Advanced to Knockout stage
3	Poland	5	3	2	367	352	+15	8	Advanced to Knockout stage
4	Finland	5	2	3	387	392	−5	7	Advanced to Knockout stage
5	Russia	5	1	4	379	374	+5	6 (Note: Bosnia and Herzegovina–Russia 61–81)	
6	Bosnia and Herzegovina	5	1	4	324	402	−78	6	

Source: eurobasket2015.org
Rules for classification: 1) Points; 2) Head-to-head results; 3) Points difference; 4) Points scored.
Notes:

All times are local (UTC+2).

== 5 September ==
=== Poland v Bosnia and Herzegovina ===
5 September 2015
15:00

Boxscore

Poland	68–64	Bosnia and Herzegovina
Scoring by quarter: 16–18, 24–12, 18–23, 10–11
Pts: Waczyński 15; Rebs: Kulig 8 Asts: Ponitka 6		Pts: Stipanović 20; Rebs: Milošević 7 Asts: Renfroe 5

Park&Suites Arena, Montpellier
Referees: Fernando Rocha (POR), Renaud Geller (BEL), Jurgis Laurinavičius (LTU)

=== Israel v Russia ===
5 September 2015
17:30

Boxscore

Israel	76–73	Russia
Scoring by quarter: 18–21, 11–18, 21–10, 26–24
Pts: Casspi 21; Rebs: Casspi 9 Asts: Ohayon 5		Pts: Khvostov, Vorontsevich 15; Rebs: Vorontsevich 13; Asts: Khvostov, Vorontsevich 5

Park&Suites Arena, Montpellier
Referees: Matej Boltauzer (SLO), Siniša Herceg (CRO), Apostolos Kalpakas (SWE)

=== France v Finland ===
5 September 2015
21:00

Boxscore

France	97–87 (OT)	Finland
Scoring by quarter: 24–22, 21–15, 23–23, 13–21, Overtime: 16–6
Pts: Parker 23; Rebs: De Colo, Lauvergne 7 Asts: De Colo 6		Pts: Wilson 21; Rebs: Murphy 11; Asts: Koponen 7

Park&Suites Arena, Montpellier
Attendance: 10,407
Referees: Oļegs Latiševs (LAT), Spyridon Gontas (GRE), Igor Dragojević (MNE)

== 6 September ==
=== Russia v Poland ===
6 September 2015
15:00

Boxscore

Russia	79–82	Poland
Scoring by quarter: 22–19, 18–23, 16–18, 23–22
Pts: Zubkov 21; Rebs: Zubkov 7 Asts: Khvostov 5		Pts: Waczyński 23; Rebs: Gortat 6 Asts: Slaughter 5

Park&Suites Arena, Montpellier
Referees: Oļegs Latiševs (LAT), Siniša Herceg (CRO), Anthonie Sinterniklaas (NED)

=== Finland v Israel ===
6 September 2015
17:30

Boxscore

Finland	66–79	Israel
Scoring by quarter: 13–25, 18–21, 23–16, 12–17
Pts: Murphy 24; Rebs: Murphy 9 Asts: Koponen 5		Pts: Eliyahu 22; Rebs: Fischer 11; Asts: Eliyahu 6

Park&Suites Arena, Montpellier
Referees: Fernando Rocha (POR), Spyridon Gontas (GRE), Renaud Geller (BEL)

=== Bosnia and Herzegovina v France ===
6 September 2015
21:00

Boxscore

Bosnia and Herzegovina	54–81	France
Scoring by quarter: 15–17, 11–20, 10–30, 18–14
Pts: Kikanović, Stipanović 10; Rebs: Albijanić 6 Asts: Šutalo 4		Pts: De Colo, Lauvergne 12; Rebs: De Colo, Lauvergne 7 Asts: Diaw 6

Park&Suites Arena, Montpellier
Attendance: 10,212
Referees: Matej Boltauzer (SLO), Apostolos Kalpakas (SWE), Jurgis Laurinavičius (LTU)

== 7 September ==
=== Finland v Russia ===
7 September 2015
15:00

Boxscore

Finland	81–79	Russia
Scoring by quarter: 16–20, 20–18, 27–26, 18–15
Pts: Murphy 19; Rebs: Kotti, Murphy 7 Asts: Koponen 6		Pts: Fridzon 22; Rebs: Vorontsevich 11; Asts: Khvostov, Vorontsevich 5

Park&Suites Arena, Montpellier
Referees: Matej Boltauzer (SLO), Igor Dragojević (MNE), Jurgis Laurinavičius (LTU)

=== Israel vs. Bosnia and Herzegovina ===
7 September 2015
17:30

Boxscore

Israel	84–86 (OT)	Bosnia and Herzegovina
Scoring by quarter: 29–16, 16–19, 15–25, 15–15, Overtime: 9–11
Pts: Casspi 29; Rebs: Fischer 8 Asts: Mekel 7		Pts: Gordić 22; Rebs: Stipanović 18; Asts: Renfroe 8

Park&Suites Arena, Montpellier
Attendance: 6,288
Referees: Fernando Rocha (POR), Oļegs Latiševs (LAT), Anthonie Sinterniklaas (NED)

=== France v Poland ===
7 September 2015
21:00

Boxscore

France	69–66	Poland
Scoring by quarter: 14–14, 16–12, 22–21, 17–19
Pts: Parker 16; Rebs: De Colo 8 Asts: Diaw 5		Pts: Waczyński 18; Rebs: Gortat 11; Asts: Koszarek, Slaughter 3

Park&Suites Arena, Montpellier
Attendance: 10,016
Referees: Spyridon Gontas (GRE), Siniša Herceg (CRO), Renaud Geller (BEL)

== 9 September ==
=== Bosnia and Herzegovina v Finland ===
9 September 2015
15:00

Boxscore

Bosnia and Herzegovina	59–88	Finland
Scoring by quarter: 12–19, 15–22, 15–31, 17–16
Pts: Albijanić 14; Rebs: Kikanović, Stipanović 5 Asts: Renfroe 6		Pts: Wilson 16; Rebs: Nuutinen 8 Asts: Koponen 6

Park&Suites Arena, Montpellier
Referees: Oļegs Latiševs (LAT), Siniša Herceg (CRO), Anthonie Sinterniklaas (NED)

=== Poland v Israel ===
9 September 2015
17:30

Boxscore

Poland	73–75	Israel
Scoring by quarter: 24–22, 8–13, 18–16, 23–24
Pts: Kulig, Waczyński 13; Rebs: Gortat 8 Asts: Ponitka 6		Pts: Casspi 35; Rebs: Fischer 8 Asts: Limonad, Mekel 5

Park&Suites Arena, Montpellier
Referees: Matej Boltauzer (SLO), Spyridon Gontas (GRE), Igor Dragojević (MNE)

=== Russia v France ===
9 September 2015
21:00

Boxscore

Russia	67–74	France
Scoring by quarter: 24–16, 12–18, 16–19, 15–21
Pts: Fridzon 20; Rebs: Vorontsevich 9 Asts: Khvostov 10		Pts: De Colo 13; Rebs: Gobert 10; Asts: Parker 4

Park&Suites Arena, Montpellier
Attendance: 10,564
Referees: Fernando Rocha (POR), Jurgis Laurinavičius (LTU), Apostolos Kalpakas (SWE)

== 10 September ==
=== Finland v Poland ===
10 September 2015
15:00

Boxscore

Finland	65–78	Poland
Scoring by quarter: 20–23, 21–19, 11–16, 13–20
Pts: Huff 17; Rebs: Nuutinen 8 Asts: Koponen 8		Pts: Waczyński 17; Rebs: Ponitka 6 Asts: Slaughter 8

Park&Suites Arena, Montpellier
Referees: Fernando Rocha (POR), Jurgis Laurinavičius (LTU), Renaud Geller (BEL)

=== Bosnia and Herzegovina v Russia ===
10 September 2015
17:30

Boxscore

Bosnia and Herzegovina	61–81	Russia
Scoring by quarter: 22–12, 9–19, 19–24, 11–26
Pts: Stipanović 22; Rebs: three players 6 Asts: Buza, Gordić 5		Pts: Zubkov 17; Rebs: Vorontsevich, Zubkov 7 Asts: Khvostov 5

Park&Suites Arena, Montpellier
Attendance: 6,519
Referees: Matej Boltauzer (SLO), Spyridon Gontas (GRE), Apostolos Kalpakas (SWE)

=== Israel vs. France ===
10 September 2015
21:00

Boxscore

Israel	61–86	France
Scoring by quarter: 10–22, 17–16, 21–24, 13–24
Pts: Limonad 13; Rebs: Kadir 9 Asts: three players 4		Pts: Gobert 15; Rebs: Gobert 10; Asts: De Colo, Parker 4

Park&Suites Arena, Montpellier
Attendance: 9,755
Referees: Oļegs Latiševs (LAT), Siniša Herceg (CRO), Igor Dragojević (MNE)
