= EuroBasket 2015 Group C =

Group C of the EuroBasket 2015 took place between 5 and 10 September 2015. The group played all of its games at Arena Zagreb in Zagreb, Croatia.

The group composed of Croatia, Georgia, Greece, Macedonia, Netherlands and Slovenia. The four best ranked teams advanced to the second round.

== Standings ==
| Pos | Team | Pld | W | L | PF | PA | PD | Pts | Qualification |
|---|---|---|---|---|---|---|---|---|---|
| 1 | Greece | 5 | 5 | 0 | 387 | 340 | +47 | 10 | Advanced to Knockout stage |
| 2 | Croatia | 5 | 3 | 2 | 359 | 343 | +16 | 8 (Note: Croatia–Slovenia 80–73) | Advanced to Knockout stage |
| 3 | Slovenia | 5 | 3 | 2 | 367 | 356 | +11 | 8 | Advanced to Knockout stage |
| 4 | Georgia | 5 | 2 | 3 | 369 | 364 | +5 | 7 | Advanced to Knockout stage |
| 5 | Macedonia | 5 | 1 | 4 | 324 | 381 | −57 | 6 (Note: Netherlands–Macedonia 71–78) | |
| 6 | Netherlands | 5 | 1 | 4 | 355 | 377 | −22 | 6 | |

Source: eurobasket2015.org
Rules for classification: 1) Points; 2) Head-to-head results; 3) Points difference; 4) Points scored.
Notes:

All times are local (UTC+2).

== 5 September ==
=== Georgia v Netherlands ===
The Dutch led 12 points at one point in the fourth quarter, but Georgia fought back. Robin Smeulders hit the game-winning jump shot with 18 seconds on the clock. It was the first EuroBasket win for the Netherlands since 4 June 1987.

5 September 2015
15:00

Boxscore

| Georgia | 72–73 | Netherlands |
Scoring by quarter: 17–17, 9–19, 22–22, 24–15
| Pts: Pachulia, Shengelia 16; Rebs: Sanikidze 9 Asts: Shengelia 5 | | Pts: Kloof 22; Rebs: W. de Jong 6 Asts: Schaftenaar 4 |

Arena Zagreb, Zagreb
Attendance: 2,391
Referees: Benjamín Jiménez (ESP), Gentian Cici (ALB), Zafer Yılmaz (TUR)

=== Macedonia v Greece ===
5 September 2015
18:00

Boxscore

| Macedonia | 65–85 | Greece |
Scoring by quarter: 16–23, 15–15, 19–21, 15–26
| Pts: Kostoski 20; Rebs: Samardžiski 6 Asts: Samardžiski, Simonovski 3 | | Pts: Printezis 18; Rebs: Koufos 11; Asts: Calathes 8 |

Arena Zagreb, Zagreb
Attendance: 2,500
Referees: Robert Lottermoser (GER), Sérgio Silva (POR), Ilya Putenko (RUS)

=== Croatia v Slovenia ===
5 September 2015
21:00

Boxscore

| Croatia | 80–73 | Slovenia |
Scoring by quarter: 17–23, 27–15, 21–16, 15–19
| Pts: Simon 20; Rebs: Šarić 7 Asts: Ukić 4 | | Pts: Dragić 14; Rebs: Blažič 6 Asts: Klobučar, Prepelič 4 |

Arena Zagreb, Zagreb
Attendance: 11,730
Referees: Luigi Lamonica (ITA), Jakub Zamojski (POL), Jean-Charles Collin (FRA)

== 6 September ==
=== Netherlands v Macedonia ===
6 September 2015
15:00

Boxscore

| Netherlands | 71–78 | Macedonia |
Scoring by quarter: 20–19, 11–24, 18–13, 22–22
| Pts: N. de Jong 19; Rebs: Norel 9 Asts: Kloof, Williams 3 | | Pts: Ilievski 14; Rebs: Hendrix 7 Asts: Ilievski 7 |

Arena Zagreb, Zagreb
Attendance: 1,170
Referees: Luigi Lamonica (ITA), Zafer Yılmaz (TUR), Jean-Charles Collin (FRA)

=== Slovenia v Georgia ===
6 September 2015
18:00

Boxscore

| Slovenia | 79–68 | Georgia |
Scoring by quarter: 17–13, 24–13, 24–22, 14–20
| Pts: Prepelič 21; Rebs: Prepelič, Slokar 5 Asts: Omić, Prepelič 4 | | Pts: Shengelia 21; Rebs: Shermadini 4 Asts: Tsintsadze 7 |

Arena Zagreb, Zagreb
Attendance: 3,892
Referees: Sérgio Silva (POR), Gentian Cici (ALB), Petri Mäntylä (FIN)

=== Greece v Croatia ===
6 September 2015
21:00

Boxscore

| Greece | 72–70 | Croatia |
Scoring by quarter: 13–18, 15–15, 23–24, 21–13
| Pts: Spanoulis 16; Rebs: Koufos 9 Asts: Spanoulis 6 | | Pts: Simon 18; Rebs: Šarić 6 Asts: Ukić 4 |

Arena Zagreb, Zagreb
Attendance: 12,000
Referees: Robert Lottermoser (GER), Benjamín Jiménez (ESP), Jakub Zamojski (POL)

== 8 September ==
=== Slovenia v Netherlands ===
8 September 2015
15:00

Boxscore

| Slovenia | 81–74 | Netherlands |
Scoring by quarter: 23–15, 18–14, 16–23, 24–22
| Pts: Prepelič 16; Rebs: Omić 7 Asts: Prepelič 6 | | Pts: Kloof 25; Rebs: Kloof, W. de Jong 6 Asts: Kloof 4 |

Arena Zagreb, Zagreb
Attendance: 1,841
Referees: Robert Lottermoser (GER), Jakub Zamojski (POL), Ilya Putenko (RUS)

=== Georgia v Greece ===
8 September 2015
18:00

Boxscore

| Georgia | 68–79 | Greece |
Scoring by quarter: 15–25, 7–25, 26–11, 20–18
| Pts: Shengelia 20; Rebs: Shengelia 8 Asts: Pachulia 5 | | Pts: Calathes 19; Rebs: Bourousis 5 Asts: Calathes 8 |

Arena Zagreb, Zagreb
Attendance: 588
Referees: Benjamín Jiménez (ESP), Sérgio Silva (POR), Zafer Yılmaz (TUR)

=== Croatia v Macedonia ===
8 September 2015
21:00

Boxscore

| Croatia | 73–55 | Macedonia |
Scoring by quarter: 15–18, 15–14, 22–10, 21–13
| Pts: Šarić 15; Rebs: Tomić 9 Asts: Simon 5 | | Pts: Samardžiski 10; Rebs: Hendrix 6 Asts: three players 3 |

Arena Zagreb, Zagreb
Attendance: 9,828
Referees: Luigi Lamonica (ITA), Gentian Cici (ALB), Petri Mäntylä (FIN)

== 9 September ==
=== Greece v Slovenia ===
9 September 2015
15:00

Boxscore

| Greece | 83–72 | Slovenia |
Scoring by quarter: 23–17, 23–14, 16–22, 21–19
| Pts: Spanoulis 19; Rebs: Bourousis 8 Asts: Spanoulis 6 | | Pts: Blažič 27; Rebs: Blažič 5 Asts: Prepelič 4 |

Arena Zagreb, Zagreb
Attendance: 5,578
Referees: Luigi Lamonica (ITA), Benjamín Jiménez (ESP), Gentian Cici (ALB)

=== Macedonia v Georgia ===
9 September 2015
18:00

Boxscore

| Macedonia | 75–90 | Georgia |
Scoring by quarter: 18–21, 19–27, 18–23, 20–19
| Pts: Hendrix, D. Stojanovski 14; Rebs: Hendrix 7 Asts: V. Stojanovski 3 | | Pts: Pachulia 23; Rebs: Pachulia 14; Asts: Tsintsadze 6 |

Arena Zagreb, Zagreb
Attendance: 680
Referees: Robert Lottermoser (GER), Jakub Zamojski (POL), Petri Mäntylä (FIN)

=== Netherlands v Croatia ===
9 September 2015
21:00

Boxscore

| Netherlands | 72–78 | Croatia |
Scoring by quarter: 18–14, 17–25, 18–23, 19–16
| Pts: Schaftenaar 19; Rebs: N. de Jong, Smeulders 6 Asts: Williams 5 | | Pts: Simon 18; Rebs: Tomić 8 Asts: Simon 8 |

Arena Zagreb, Zagreb
Attendance: 6,200
Referees: Sérgio Silva (POR), Ilya Putenko (RUS), Jean-Charles Collin (FRA)

== 10 September ==
=== Slovenia v Macedonia ===
10 September 2015
15:00

Boxscore

| Slovenia | 62–51 | Macedonia |
Scoring by quarter: 24–10, 7–14, 21–17, 10–10
| Pts: Dragić 20; Rebs: Omić 11; Asts: Klobučar 6 | | Pts: Ilievski 15; Rebs: Trajkovski 9 Asts: Simonovski 3 |

Arena Zagreb, Zagreb
Attendance: 4,438
Referees: Robert Lottermoser (GER), Sérgio Silva (POR), Ilya Putenko (RUS)

=== Georgia v Croatia ===
10 September 2015
18:00

Boxscore

| Georgia | 71–58 | Croatia |
Scoring by quarter: 14–13, 11–15, 22–16, 24–14
| Pts: three players 12; Rebs: Pachulia 7 Asts: Shengelia 5 | | Pts: Žorić 16; Rebs: three players 5 Asts: Stipčević 5 |

Arena Zagreb, Zagreb
Attendance: 6,600
Referees: Luigi Lamonica (ITA), Benjamín Jiménez (ESP), Jean-Charles Collin (FRA)

=== Greece v Netherlands ===
10 September 2015
21:00

Boxscore

| Greece | 68–65 | Netherlands |
Scoring by quarter: 17–19, 17–12, 18–15, 16–19
| Pts: Antetokounmpo 11; Rebs: Antetokounmpo 11; Asts: Calathes 5 | | Pts: Kloof 15; Rebs: Smeulders 8 Asts: Kloof, Slagter 4 |

Arena Zagreb, Zagreb
Attendance: 368
Referees: Jakub Zamojski (POL), Zafer Yılmaz (TUR), Petri Mäntylä (FIN)
