= Stade Pierre-Mauroy =

Stadium in Villeneuve-d'Ascq, France

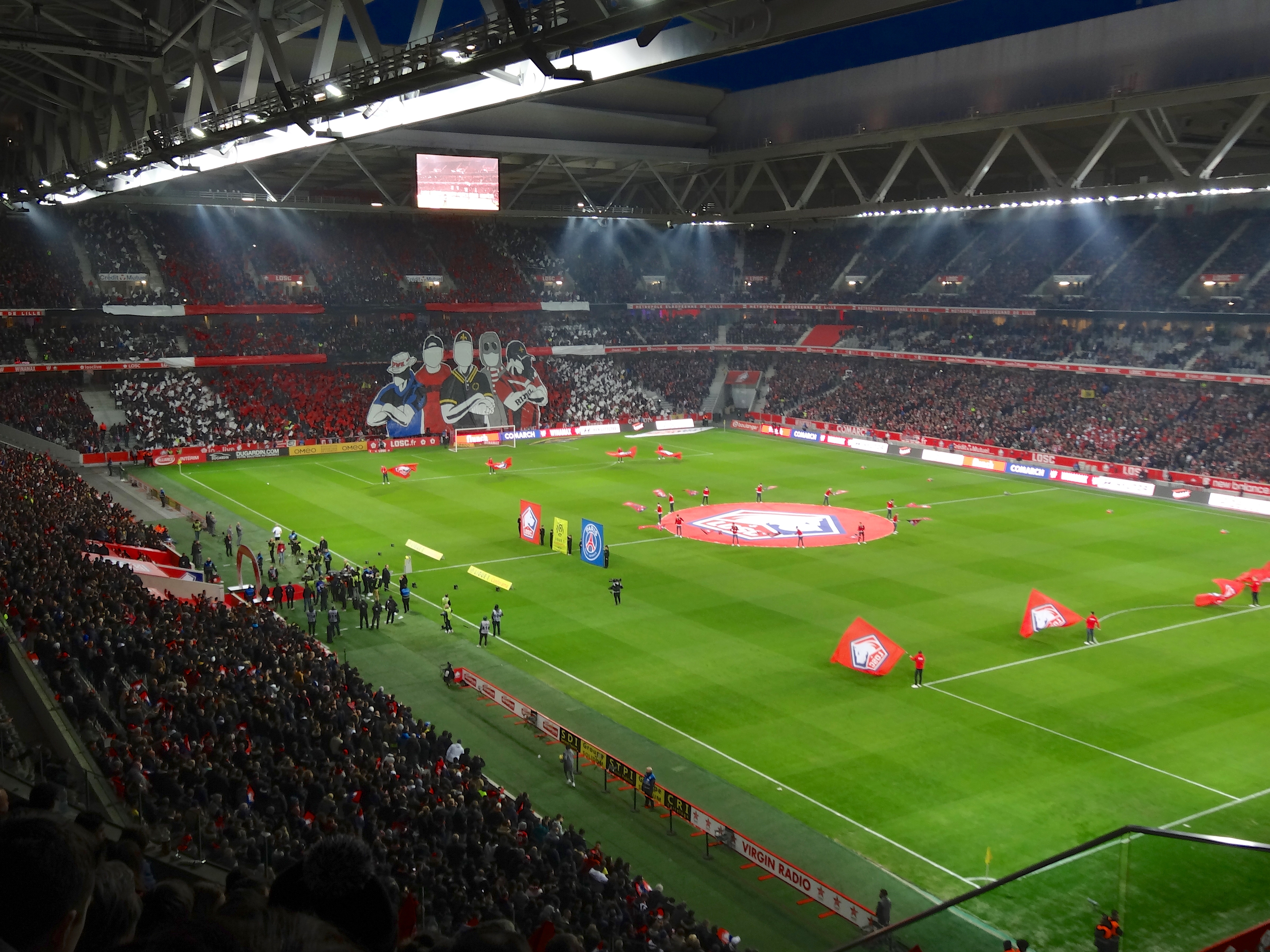
- UEFA
- Interactive map of Stade Pierre-Mauroy
- Former names: Grand Stade Lille Métropole (2012–2013)
- Address: 261 Boulevard de Tournai
- Location: Villeneuve-d'Ascq, Nord, France
- Coordinates: 50.6119°N 3.1304°E
- Owner: Eiffage Lille Stadium Arena (until 2043); Métropole Européenne de Lille (from 2043)
- Capacity: 50,186 (Note: Initial capacity decreasing for club football matches/international fixtures due to home and away supporter segregation, and/or broadcast commentary position layout)
- Roof: Retractable
- Surface: AirFibr hybrid grass
- Record attendance: List: Sports (stadium): 49,712 14 April 2019 Lille vs Paris Saint-Germain; Sports (arena): 28,010 21 & 24 January 2017 2017 World Men's Handball Championship, several matches; Concerts (stadium): 67,838 2 July 2022 Indochine, Central Tour; Concerts (arena): 28,262 31 March 2017 Bruno Mars, 24K Magic World Tour

Construction
- Groundbreaking: 2009
- Built: 2009–2012
- Opened: 17 August 2012; 14 years ago
- Cost: €324 million
- Architects: Valode & Pistre; Pierre Ferret

Tenants
- Lille (2012–present); France national football team (selected matches); France national rugby union team (selected matches): Major sporting events hosted; UEFA Euro 2016; 2023 Rugby World Cup; Davis Cup (2014, 2017, 2018); EuroBasket 2015; 2024 Summer Olympics basketball and handball

Website
- stade-pierre-mauroy.com

The Stade Pierre-Mauroy (French pronunciation: [stad pjɛʁ moʁwa]), also known as the Decathlon Arena – Stade Pierre-Mauroy for sponsorship reasons, is a multi-use retractable roof stadium in Villeneuve-d'Ascq, Metropolis of Lille, Northern France, that opened in August 2012. With a seating capacity of 50,186, it is the fourth-largest sports stadium in France and the home of French professional football club Lille.

Initially named Grand Stade Lille Métropole, the stadium was renamed on 21 June 2013, after the death of the former Mayor of Lille and former Prime Minister of France Pierre Mauroy (1928–2013). The stadium, which hosted UEFA Euro 2016 and 2023 Rugby World Cup, can also be turned into an adjustable arena being expandable to 30,000 seats where indoor sports games and concerts take place. Therefore, multiple Davis Cup events, EuroBasket 2015 and 2024 Summer Olympics basketball and handball tournaments matches have been held in the building. The venue will host matches during the 2031 FIBA Basketball World Cup.

== History ==
=== Before the Grand Stade ===
In 1975, Lille began playing at the Stade Grimonprez-Jooris, a 21,128-seat facility. When the club began to play European Competitions, the venue did not match UEFA standards, prompting the club to play its UEFA Champions League games at the Stade Félix-Bollaert, home of rival RC Lens, in 2001. Plans were soon made to build a new stadium which would match UEFA demands, but the project was postponed and finally cancelled due to struggle with preservationists who stated that the location chosen for the new stadium was too close to the 17th-century Citadel.

The club, left without a place to play, moved to the Stadium Nord which was smaller than Grimonprez-Jooris (18,154 seats) and did not fulfill UEFA demands. This situation forced the team, who had qualified for 2005–06 UEFA Champions League, to play at the Stade de France for its European matches. This solution was abandoned after two young LOSC fans lost their lives when they got hit by an incoming train after a game against Olympique Lyonnais.

=== New administration, new project ===
While LOSC was struggling with its stadium problems, the administrative landscape of the Lille area changed. The city was now included in a vast association with its enclosed neighbours, forming the Urban Community of Lille Métropole. The new administration, now in charge of the whole area, decided to launch a new stadium project. On 5 December 2006, an industrial bid for a 50,000-seat multi-purpose stadium, able to receive sport competitions, cultural shows and hold seminars, was launched.

The following January, three worldwide construction companies answered the call, each one with ambitious projects:

- Eiffage: a 50,000-seat capacity multi-purpose stadium, Meeting HQE standards with a retractable roof. The stadium has also a particularity: it can become a fully functional arena of 30,000 seats in only one hour: the Boite à spectacle.
- Bouygues: The project proposed by the company was highly effective in energy saving. The structure was geothermic and most of its power was produced by Renewable energy. The stadium would have a 50,127-seat capacity.
- Vinci: The project proposed by Vinci was the largest of the competition with a 50,921-seat capacity and a retractable roof. It would have been powered by 8000 m^{2} of Solar panels

In February 2008, Eiffage was selected during a general meeting to build the stadium. The contract was officially signed between the two parties on October of the same year. Eiffage was given 45 months to complete the project

=== Stadium construction ===
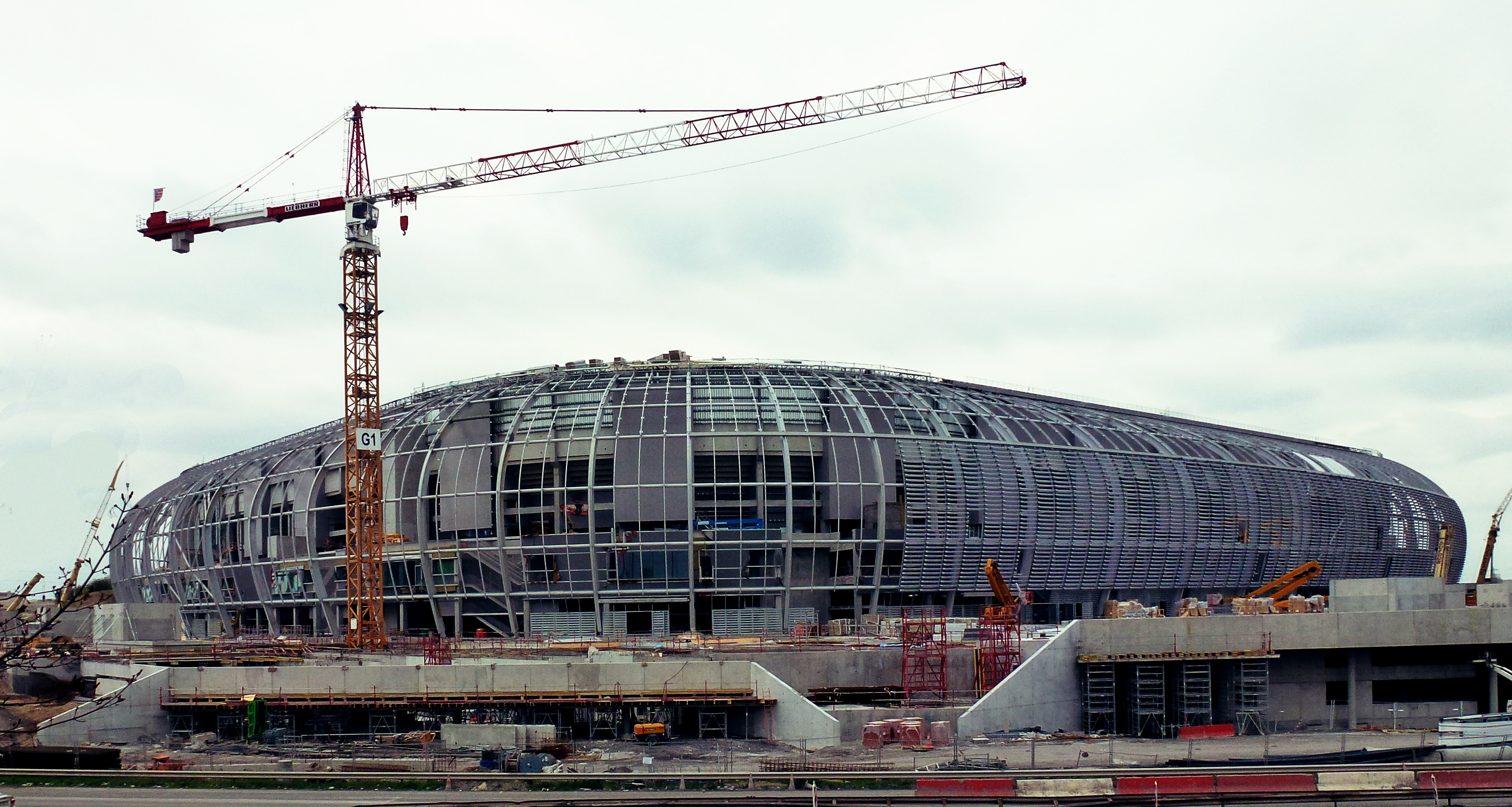
Stadium construction Pierre-Mauroy (2012)

On 10 July 2009, Eiffage received the building permit and authorisation to start preparatory works for the construction at the Borne de l'Espoir location in Villeneuve-d'Ascq. In December 2009, the final two cities of the Lille Métropole who had yet to sign the building permit joined the project and gave their authorisation. In February 2010, France officially became a candidate to organize the UEFA Euro 2016. The Grand Stade become the symbol of the candidature, boosting its public support. In March 2010, construction of access infrastructure (Subway, Highway, parking lots) began followed one week after by the beginning of the construction of the arena itself. On 28 May 2010, France was officially chosen to organize the Euro 2016. Martine Aubry, who succeeded Pierre Mauroy at the head of LCMU and a big supporter of LOSC and the Grand Stade, expressed her wish to see the Grand Stade given a prominent amount of competition for the upcoming competition. Construction accelerated, with the first brick laid by the Eiffage CEO in September 2010. In 2011, the structure supporting the roof was put in place and constructions of the northern stand was completed by the end of that year. In 2012, the retractable roof, constructed in one piece, was successfully put in place in one day. Despite some legal delays, the stadium was delivered on schedule during the summer of 2012, in time for the 2012–13 LOSC season.

== Structure, facilities and uses ==
=== Cost and financing ===
Exterior view of the stadium during UEFA Euro 2016

The total cost of the Eiffage project was €618 million, including €282 million for the stadium, €42 million for additional development such as parking, hotels, and restaurants, and €96 million to ensure seismic standards were met. This latter requirement was introduced in 2011, following a new law passed in the wake of the massive Japan earthquake and tsunami. The cost was spread between the city of Lille (€24.7 million annually for 31 years), the LOSC (€7.5 million annually) and the Nord-Pas-de-Calais regional council (€45 million).

The cost of the project spurred considerable controversy. On one hand, Martine Aubry and her First Deputy Pierre de Saintignon, in charge of the project, highlighted the Grand Stade as "a splendid ambassador of the technologies of our region, and a great tool of attractivity". On the other hand, opponents pointed to a lack of long term viability, since part of the public investments were bound to sporting events, whose results are of random nature. This could lead to some new kind of toxic loans.

=== Multiple floor features ===
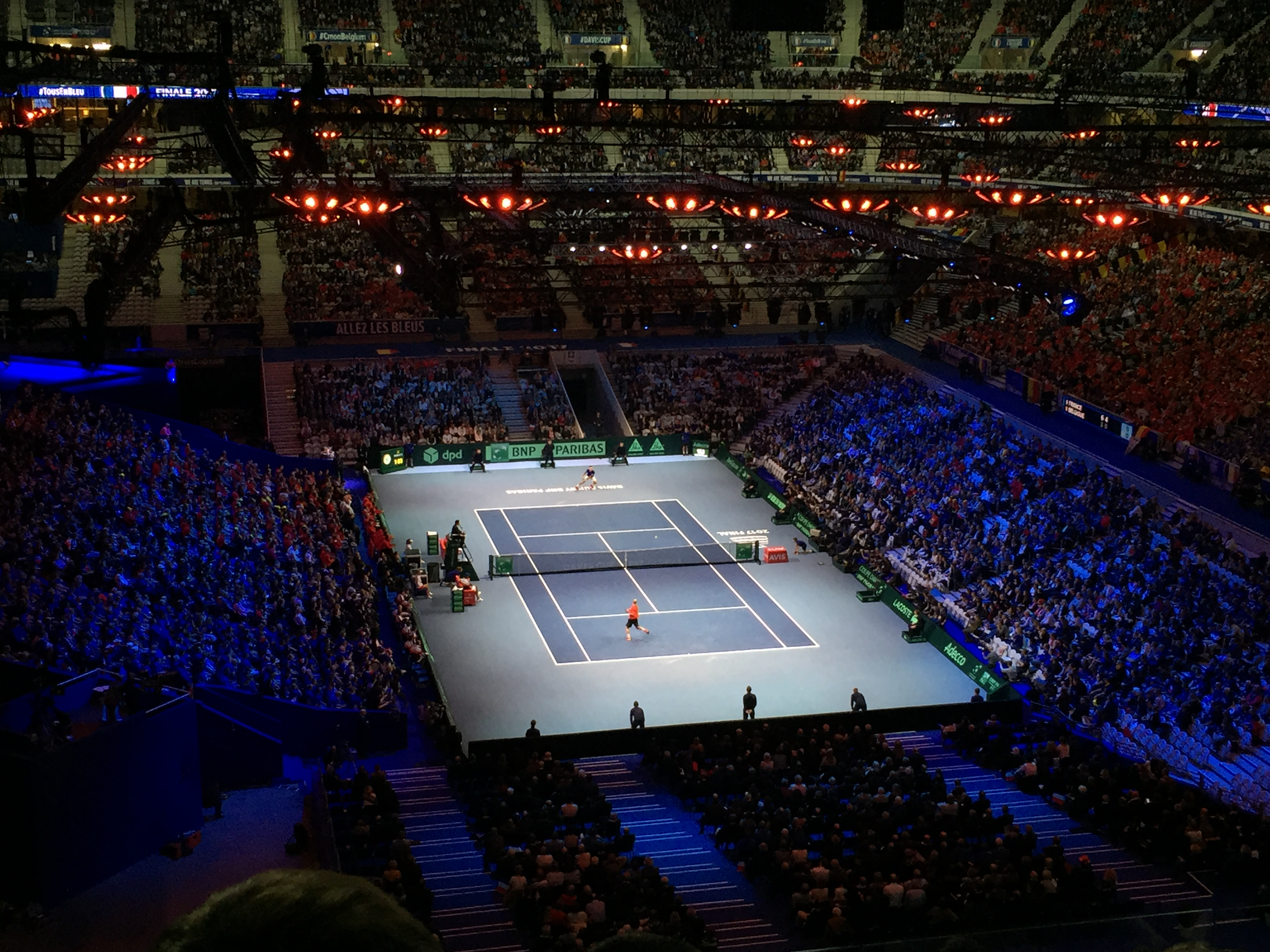
Stade Pierre-Mauroy during the 2017 Davis Cup final

Stade Pierre-Mauroy has two floors or main levels. The full stadium level or Grand Stade reaches a height of 31 m (101 feet) and has a total capacity of 50,186 seats including 4,965 business seats, 1,842 luxury-box seats, 448 protocol seats and 326 reserved for the press.

The stadium has also a peculiarity: half of the Grand Stade field is situated on hydraulics lift and massive tracks that raise and slide it above the other half of the field in three hours. This creates a second lower-level floor plan and surrounding seats called Boîte à Spectacles, where basketball, tennis or music shows can take place. The Boîte à Spectacles can be configured to have a variable capacity, from 6,900 to 30,000 seats.

In addition, Stade Pierre-Mauroy has a retractable roof which opens and shuts in 15 minutes. The stadium is also recognised as a HQE Building with solar panels and two windmills to provide as electrical supply. The stadium is fully accessible by metro stations and road and includes 7,000 parking spaces.

=== Tenants and sports uses ===
The Grand Stade received a five-star UEFA ranking. It is expected to significantly increase the revenue streams of Lille, its tenant club.

The stadium hosted France national football team and France national rugby union team as well as some games of UEFA Euro 2016 and many Top 14 matches. The stadium hosted its first rugby union test match on 17 November 2012 during the 2012 Autumn Internationals, when France defeated Argentina 39–22. It was one of the nine venues selected for France's hosting of the 2023 Rugby World Cup. The 30,000-seat arena hosted EuroBasket 2015, Davis Cup, 2017 World Men's Handball Championship and hosted handball and basketball tournaments at the 2024 Olympic Games.

The record attendance for a sports game stands at 49,712 spectators, who witnessed Lille's 5–1 win over PSG in 2019.

Due to the upgrade works at the Stade de France for the 2024 Summer Olympics and Paralympics, the 2024 Coupe de France final was relocated to the stadium. This marked the first time in the history of the competition that a final has been contested outside Paris (or its near suburbs).

== EuroBasket 2015 matches ==
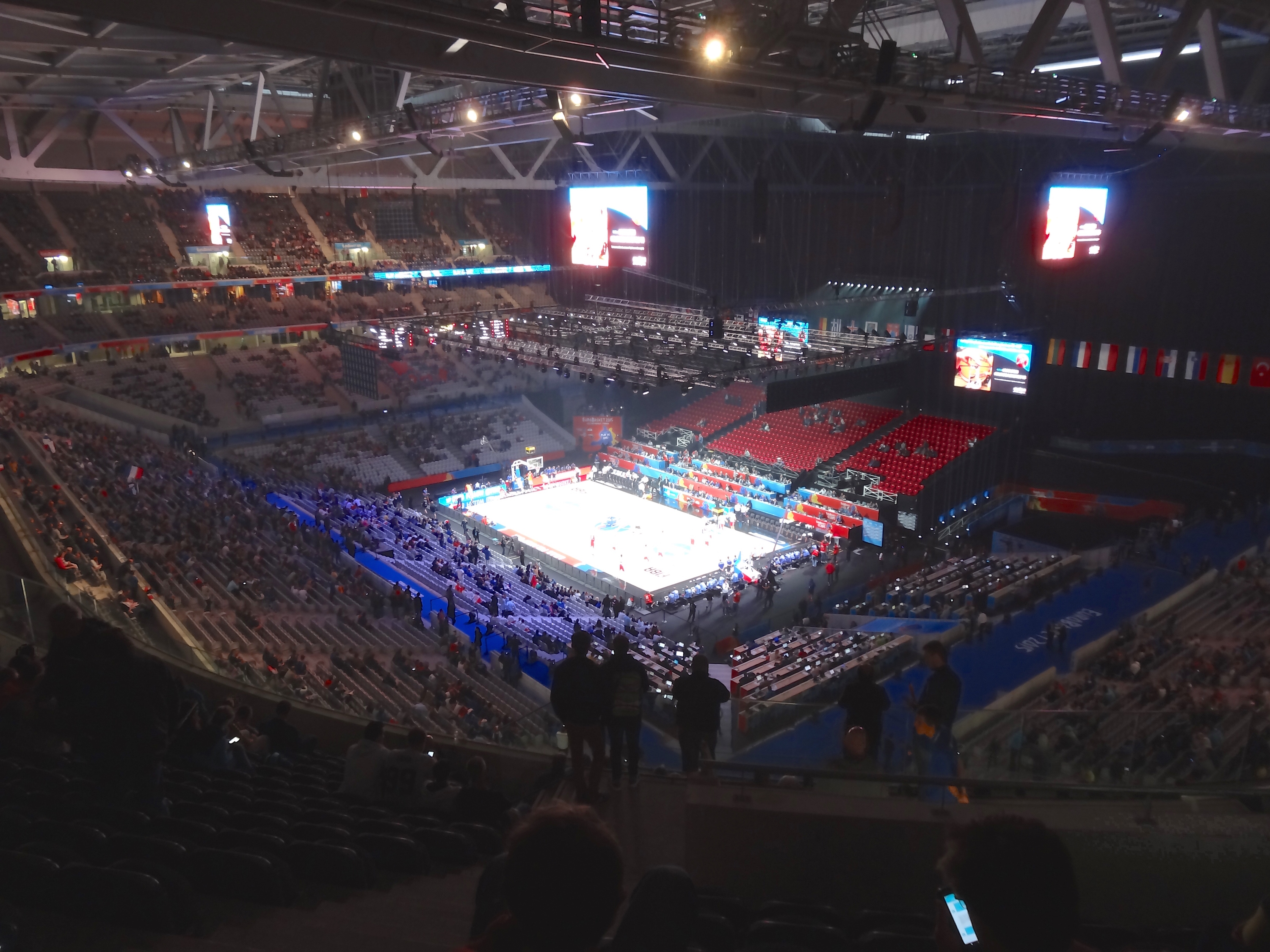
Stade Pierre-Mauroy during the FIBA EuroBasket 2015

The knock-out phase of EuroBasket 2015 was held at the Stade Pierre-Mauroy from 12 to 20 September 2015, including the Final. The indoor configuration of the stadium has a capacity of 27,000.

Date	Time (CET)	Team #1	Result	Team #2	Round	Attendance
12 September 2015	12:00	Latvia	73–66	Slovenia	Round of 16	10,023
12 September 2015	14:30	Greece	75–54	Belgium	Round of 16	13,672
12 September 2015	18:30	Spain	80–66	Poland	Round of 16	21,302
12 September 2015	21:00	France	76–53	Turkey	Round of 16	26,135
13 September 2015	12:00	Croatia	59–80	Czech Republic	Round of 16	12,070
13 September 2015	14:30	Serbia	94–81	Finland	Round of 16	12,128
13 September 2015	18:30	Israel	52–82	Italy	Round of 16	14,742
13 September 2015	21:00	Lithuania	85–81	Georgia	Round of 16	16,953
15 September 2015	18:30	Spain	73–71	Greece	Quarter-finals	17,864
15 September 2015	21:00	France	84–70	Latvia	Quarter-finals	22,076
16 September 2015	18:30	Serbia	89–75	Czech Republic	Quarter-finals	8,726
16 September 2015	21:00	Italy	85–95 (OT)	Lithuania	Quarter-finals	13,173
17 September 2015	16:00	Greece	97–90	Latvia	Olympic qualifying playoff games	
17 September 2015	18:30	Czech Republic	70–85	Italy	Olympic qualifying playoff games	15,004
17 September 2015	21:00	Spain	80–75 (OT)	France	Semi-final	26,922
18 September 2015	18:30	Latvia	70–97	Czech Republic	Olympic qualifying playoff games	11,362
18 September 2015	21:00	Serbia	64–67	Lithuania	Semi-final	20,042
20 September 2015	14:00	France	81–68	Serbia	Third place game	24,092
20 September 2015	19:00	Spain	80–63	Lithuania	Final	27,372

== UEFA Euro 2016 matches ==
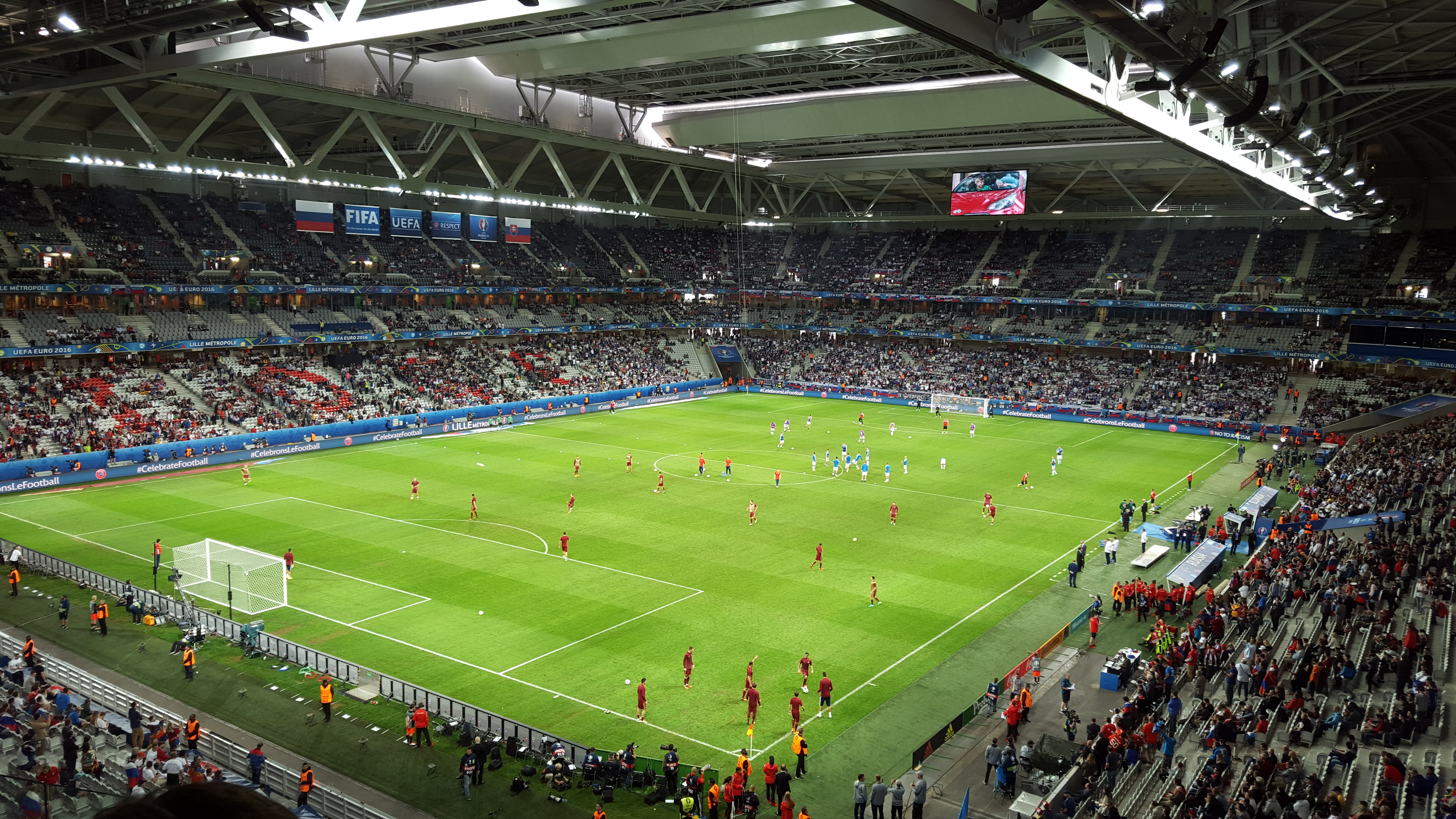
Stade Pierre-Mauroy during the UEFA Euro 2016

The stadium was one of the venues of the UEFA Euro 2016, and held the following matches:

Date	Time (CET)	Team #1	Result	Team #2	Round	Attendance
12 June 2016	21:00	Germany	2–0	Ukraine	Group C	43,035
15 June 2016	15:00	Russia	1–2	Slovakia	Group B	38,989
19 June 2016	21:00	Switzerland	0–0	France	Group A	45,616
22 June 2016	21:00	Italy	0–1	Republic of Ireland	Group E	44,268
26 June 2016	18:00	Germany	3–0	Slovakia	Round of 16	44,312
1 July 2016	21:00	Wales	3–1	Belgium	Quarter-final	45,936

== 2023 Rugby World Cup matches ==
Date	Time (CET)	Team #1	Result	Team #2	Round	Attendance
14 September 2023	21:00	France	27–12	Uruguay	Pool A	48,821
23 September 2023	17:45	England	71–0	Chile	Pool D	44,315
30 September 2023	21:00	Scotland	84–0	Romania	Pool B	46,516
7 October 2023	17:45	England	18–17	Samoa	Pool D	47,891
8 October 2023	17:45	Tonga	45–24	Romania	Pool B	45,042

The stadium was also used for the France–Italy match in the 2026 Six Nations Championship.

== Concerts ==
Concerts at Stade Pierre-Mauroy
Date	Artist	Tour	Attendance
20 July 2013	Rihanna	Diamonds World Tour	27,294
23 July 2016	Rihanna	Anti World Tour	34,000
5 & 6 Septembre 2014	Patrick Bruel		
31 March 2017	Bruno Mars	24K Magic World Tour	28,262
29 May 2017	Depeche Mode	Global Spirit Tour	26,113
2 June 2017	Contestants from seasons 1 to 3 of Prodiges	—N/a	approx 40,000
24 June 2017	Justin Bieber	Purpose World Tour	27,000
1 July 2017	Celine Dion	Celine Dion Live 2017	51,355
2 July 2017	Celine Dion	Celine Dion Live 2017	51,355
16 June 2018	Roger Waters	Us + Them	23,649
18 June 2019	Elton John	Farewell Yellow Brick Road	26,517
22 June 2019	Indochine	13 Tour	27,000
23 June 2019	Indochine	13 Tour	27,000
28 June 2019	Suprême NTM	L'Ultime Tournée !	13,248
6 September 2019	Soprano	Phoenix Tour	25,000
7 September 2019	Soprano	Phoenix Tour	25,000
4 June 2022	Ninho	Jefe Tour	22,000
2 July 2022	Indochine	Central Tour	67,838
3 July 2022	Indochine	Central Tour	67,481
12 May 2023	Roger Waters	This Is Not a Drill	—N/a
24 May 2023	Peter Gabriel	i/o the Tour	—N/a
3 June 2023	Mylene Farmer	Nevermore 2023	45,000
22 June 2023	Depeche Mode	Memento Mori World Tour	
23 April 2025	Ninho	Jefe Airlines Tour	
24 May 2025	Bruce Springsteen & E Street Band	Springsteen and E Street Band 2024+2025 Tour	
27 May 2025	Bruce Springsteen & E Street Band	Springsteen and E Street Band 2024+2025 Tour	
20 June 2025	Ed Sheeran	The Mathematics Tour	130,000
21 June 2025	Ed Sheeran	The Mathematics Tour	130,000

== Notes ==
Events and tenants
Preceded by Kombank Arena, Belgrade; Arena Zagreb, Zagreb	Davis Cup; Final Venue; 2014; 2017, 2018	Succeeded by Flanders Expo, Ghent; Caja Mágica, Madrid
Preceded by Arena Stožice; Ljubljana	FIBA EuroBasket; Final Venue; 2015	Succeeded by Sinan Erdem Dome; Istanbul
Preceded by Arena da Baixada; Curitiba (as FIVB Volleyball World League Final Venue)	FIVB Volleyball Men's Nations League; Final Venue; 2018	Succeeded by Credit Union 1 Arena; Chicago
