= Nicolas de Jong =

Dutch-French basketball player

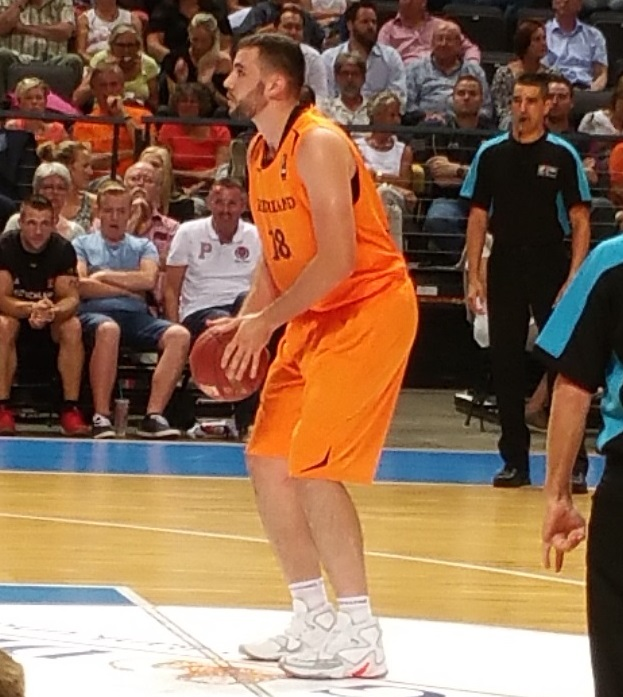
- De Jong playing for the Netherlands in 2016

Free Agent
- Position: Center

Personal information
- Born: April 15, 1988 (age 38) Chambray-lès-Tours, France
- Listed height: 6 ft 11 in (2.11 m)
- Listed weight: 114 kg (251 lb)

Career information
- NBA draft: 2010: undrafted
- Playing career: 2006–present

Career history
- 2006–2008: Tours Joué Basket
- 2008–2011: JA Vichy
- 2011–2013: SIG Strasbourg
- 2013–2014: Antibes Sharks
- 2014–2016: Cholet
- 2016–2017: Champagne Châlons-Reims
- 2017–2018: Zaragoza
- 2018–2019: Boulazac Dordogne
- 2019–2021: Élan Béarnais
- 2021: Estudiantes
- 2021–2023: Boulazac Basket

Nicolas de Jong (born April 15, 1988) is a Dutch-French professional basketball player. Standing at 6 ft 11 in (2.11 m), de Jong usually plays as center.

== Professional career ==
De Jong started his professional career with Tours Joué in the NM2, the fourth tier in France. After two seasons, he signed with JA Vichy, a LNB Pro A team, while still playing with the club's junior team. In the 2012–13 LNB Pro A season, he played in the Finals with Strasbourg IG against JSF Nanterre, but lost 1–3. For the 2013–14 season, De Jong signed with just promoted Antibes Sharks.

In the 2014 offseason, De Jong signed with Cholet Basket. In the 2014–15 season, De Jong averaged 8.6 points and 4.6 rebounds per game. He extended his contract in June 2015.

In June 2016, De Jong signed with Champagne Châlons-Reims.

On August 28, 2017, De Jong signed with Basket Zaragoza of the Spanish Liga ACB. He averaged 8.7 points and 3.8 rebounds per game. On August 27, 2018, De Jong signed with Boulazac Basket Dordogne of the French LNB Pro A.

De Jong signed with Élan Béarnais of the Pro A and Basketball Champions League (BCL) for the 2019–20 season.

On October 1, 2021, De Jong signed with Movistar Estudiantes of the LEB Oro.

On November 5, 2021, he has signed with Boulazac Basket Dordogne of the LNB Pro B.

== International career ==
In 2015, De Jong was selected for the Dutch national basketball team by head coach Toon van Helfteren. He made his debut against Italy on July 30, 2015. He participated on EuroBasket 2015 with the Dutch team, where he averaged 9.8 points and 4.6 rebounds per game. De Jong's best game was a 19-point performance in a group stage game against Macedonia.

== Personal ==
De Jong is the son of a Dutch father and a French mother.
