= EuroBasket 2015 =

International basketball event

Championnat d'Europe masculin de basket-ball 2015 (in French) Europsko prvenstvo u košarci 2015. (in Croatian) Basketball-Europameisterschaft 2015 (in German): 2015. gada Eiropas čempionāts basketbolā; (in Latvian)

Tournament details
- Host countries: France; Croatia; Germany; Latvia
- Dates: 5–20 September 2015
- Teams: 24
- Venues: 5 (in 5 host cities)

Final positions
- Champions: Spain (3rd title)
- Runners-up: Lithuania
- Third place: France
- Fourth place: Serbia

Tournament statistics
- Games played: 79
- Attendance: 711,131 (9,002 per game)
- MVP: (Spain) Pau Gasol
- Top scorer: (Spain) Pau Gasol (25.6 ppg)
- Top rebounds: (Russia) Andrey Vorontsevich (9.2 rpg)
- Top assists: (Lithuania) Mantas Kalnietis (7.8 apg)
- PPG (Team): Italy (85.8 ppg)
- RPG (Team): France (41.6 rpg)
- APG (Team): Serbia (23.0 apg)

Official website
- www.fiba.basketball

Qualified teams for the EuroBasket 2015

Former EuroBasket 2015 logo

EuroBasket 2015 was the 39th edition of the EuroBasket championship that was organized by FIBA Europe. It was co-hosted by Croatia, France, Germany, and Latvia, making it the first EuroBasket held in more than one country. It started on 5 September and ended on 20 September 2015.

The top two teams (Spain and Lithuania) qualified for the 2016 Summer Olympics. The next five teams (France, Serbia, Greece, Italy and the Czech Republic) advanced to the World Olympic Qualifying Tournaments. Latvia and Croatia later qualified due to Serbia and Italy hosting two of the Olympic qualifying tournaments while Turkey also qualified as an invitee.

Spain won their third title by defeating Lithuania 80–63 in the final. France won bronze on home soil defeating Serbia (81–68). The final game was held in the Stade Pierre-Mauroy and set a new record for the highest attendance in a EuroBasket game, with 26,922. Pau Gasol was named the tournament's MVP.

== Host selection ==
On 18 December 2011, FIBA Europe decided to let Ukraine host EuroBasket 2015, after France, Croatia, Germany and Italy withdrew their joint bid. On 19 March 2014, tournament director Markiyan Lubkivsky announced that EuroBasket 2015 would not take place in Ukraine because of the Russo-Ukrainian War and the championship would be relocated. But later, FIBA Europe was forced to deny reports that Ukraine had given up the hosting rights for EuroBasket 2015 due to the continuous political situation and security issues in Ukraine. On 13 June 2014, FIBA Europe officially announced that Ukraine would not be hosting the championships.

Sixteen countries expressed an initial interest to bid for the relocated event. National Federations were called by FIBA Europe to officially bid for hosting the tournament or parts of the tournament until 31 July 2014. The next day FIBA Europe announced eight official bids from potential organizers:

- Croatia
- Finland
- France
- Germany
- Israel
- Latvia
- Poland
- Turkey

All interested federations were provided the option to bid to stage either one of the four groups in the Group Phase of the tournament, one of the groups and the Final Phase, only the finals, or the entire tournament. FIBA Europe was scheduled to officially announce the details of the bids after 27 August 2014.

Croatia, France, Poland and Turkey bid to host one of the four groups in the Group Phase and the Final Phase in the knock-out round. Additionally, Turkey also bid to host the Final Phase only.

All other countries bid to host only one of the four groups in the Group Phase. Prior to the Board Meeting, Turkey withdrew their candidature from hosting any part of the tournament while Poland and Croatia withdrew their candidature to host the Final Phase of the tournament, leaving France as the only candidate to host the Final Phase.

On 8 September 2014, it was announced that the FIBA EuroBasket 2015 tournament would be hosted in Germany (Berlin), Croatia (Zagreb), Latvia (Riga) and France (Montpellier), with each of the countries hosting one respective group during the group stage of the tournament. France would be the hosts of the finals in the knock-out phase in the city of Lille at the multi-functional Stade Pierre-Mauroy, which has a 27,000 capacity for basketball.

== Venues ==
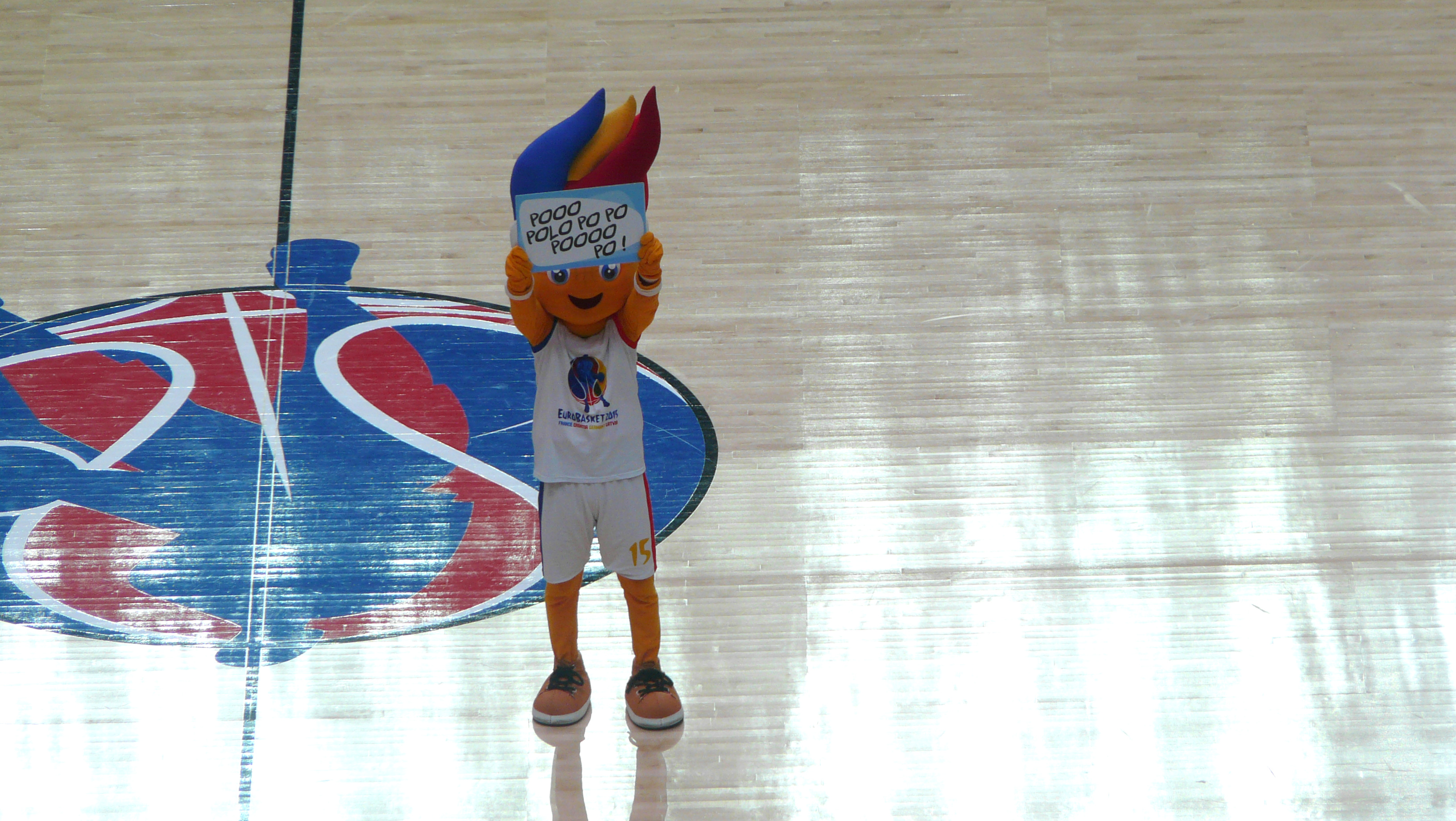
Frenkie was the official mascot

Lille	EuroBasket 2015 (Europe)	
Stade Pierre-Mauroy	EuroBasket 2015 (Europe)	
Capacity: 27,500 (Note: Indoor configuration)	EuroBasket 2015 (Europe)	
Montpellier	EuroBasket 2015 (Europe)	
Park&Suites Arena	EuroBasket 2015 (Europe)	
Capacity: 10,700	EuroBasket 2015 (Europe)	
Zagreb	Berlin	Riga
Arena Zagreb	Mercedes-Benz Arena	Arena Riga
Capacity: 16,500	Capacity: 14,500	Capacity: 11,200

== Qualification ==
Qualification for the tournament took place in two phases; the first featured 13 teams who failed to qualify for FIBA EuroBasket 2013, the winner of which qualifying directly for the finals. The remaining teams then went into qualification with the remaining FIBA Europe sides.

=== Qualified teams ===
Team	Qualification	Date of qualification	Tournament appearance	Last appearance
Spain	Host nation of 2014 FIBA Basketball World Cup & 3rd place of FIBA EuroBasket 2013	23 May 2009	30	2013
Ukraine	6th place at FIBA EuroBasket 2013	18 December 2011 (as initial host)	7	2013
Estonia	Winners of 1st round of FIBA EuroBasket 2015 qualification	1 September 2013	5	2001
France	Winners of FIBA EuroBasket 2013	18 September 2013	37	2013
Slovenia	5th place at FIBA EuroBasket 2013	19 September 2013	12	2013
Croatia	4th place at FIBA EuroBasket 2013	19 September 2013	12	2013
Lithuania	Runner-up at FIBA EuroBasket 2013	19 September 2013	13	2013
Serbia	7th place at FIBA EuroBasket 2013	21 September 2013	5	2013
Finland	Wild card at 2014 FIBA Basketball World Cup	1 February 2014	13	2013
Greece	Wild card at 2014 FIBA Basketball World Cup	1 February 2014	25	2013
Turkey	Wild card at 2014 FIBA Basketball World Cup	1 February 2014	22	2013
Latvia	1st in Second round Group F	24 August 2014	13	2013
Israel	1st in Second round Group B	24 August 2014	28	2013
Bosnia and Herzegovina	1st in Second round Group A	24 August 2014	9	2013
Belgium	1st in Second round Group D	24 August 2014	16	2013
Georgia	1st in Second round Group E	27 August 2014	3	2013
Czech Republic	2nd in Second round Group E	27 August 2014	4	2013
Germany	2nd in Second round Group C	27 August 2014	23	2013
Netherlands	2nd in Second round Group B	27 August 2014	15	1989
Poland	1st in Second round Group C	27 August 2014	27	2013
Macedonia	2nd in Second round Group D	27 August 2014	5	2013
Italy	1st in Second round Group G	27 August 2014	36	2013
Russia	2nd in Second round Group G	27 August 2014	12	2013
Iceland	2nd in Second round Group A	27 August 2014	1	–

== Draw ==
=== Seedings ===
FIBA Europe released the seedings for the EuroBasket 2015 draw on 27 November 2014. According to the FIBA Europe regulations the participating nations, the 10 participants of the 2014 World Cup would be seeded first, based on their respective records in FIBA EuroBasket 2013, with the remaining teams seeded based on their qualification records.

Team	Qualification	Position	Record
France	EuroBasket 2013	1	
Lithuania	EuroBasket 2013	2	
Spain	2014 FIBA Basketball World Cup Host	3 (EuroBasket 2013)	
Croatia	EuroBasket 2013	4	
Slovenia	EuroBasket 2013	5	
Ukraine	EuroBasket 2013	6	
Serbia	EuroBasket 2013	7	
Finland	2014 FIBA Basketball World Cup Wildcard	8 (EuroBasket 2013)	
Greece	2014 FIBA Basketball World Cup Wildcard	11 (EuroBasket 2013)	
Turkey	2014 FIBA Basketball World Cup Wildcard	17 (EuroBasket 2013)	
Latvia	2015 Round 2	Q1	6–0, 1.2398
Bosnia and Herzegovina	2015 Round 2	Q2	4–0, 1.1386
Poland	2015 Round 2	Q3	5–1, 1.2385
Belgium	2015 Round 2	Q4	5–1, 1.1979
Macedonia	2015 Round 2	Q5	5–1, 1.1450
Italy	2015 Round 2	Q6	3–1, 1.1654
Germany	2015 Round 2	Q7	4–2, 1.3243
Israel	2015 Round 2	Q8	4–2, 1.1195
Czech Republic	2015 Round 2	Q9	4–2, 1.1150
Georgia	2015 Round 2	Q10	4–2, 1.0558
Netherlands	2015 Round 2	Q11	4–2, 1.0107
Russia	2015 Round 2	Q12	2–2, 1.1679
Iceland	2015 Round 2	Q13	2–2, 0.9896
Estonia	2015 Round 1	Q1st	5–3, 1.1286

=== Final draw ===
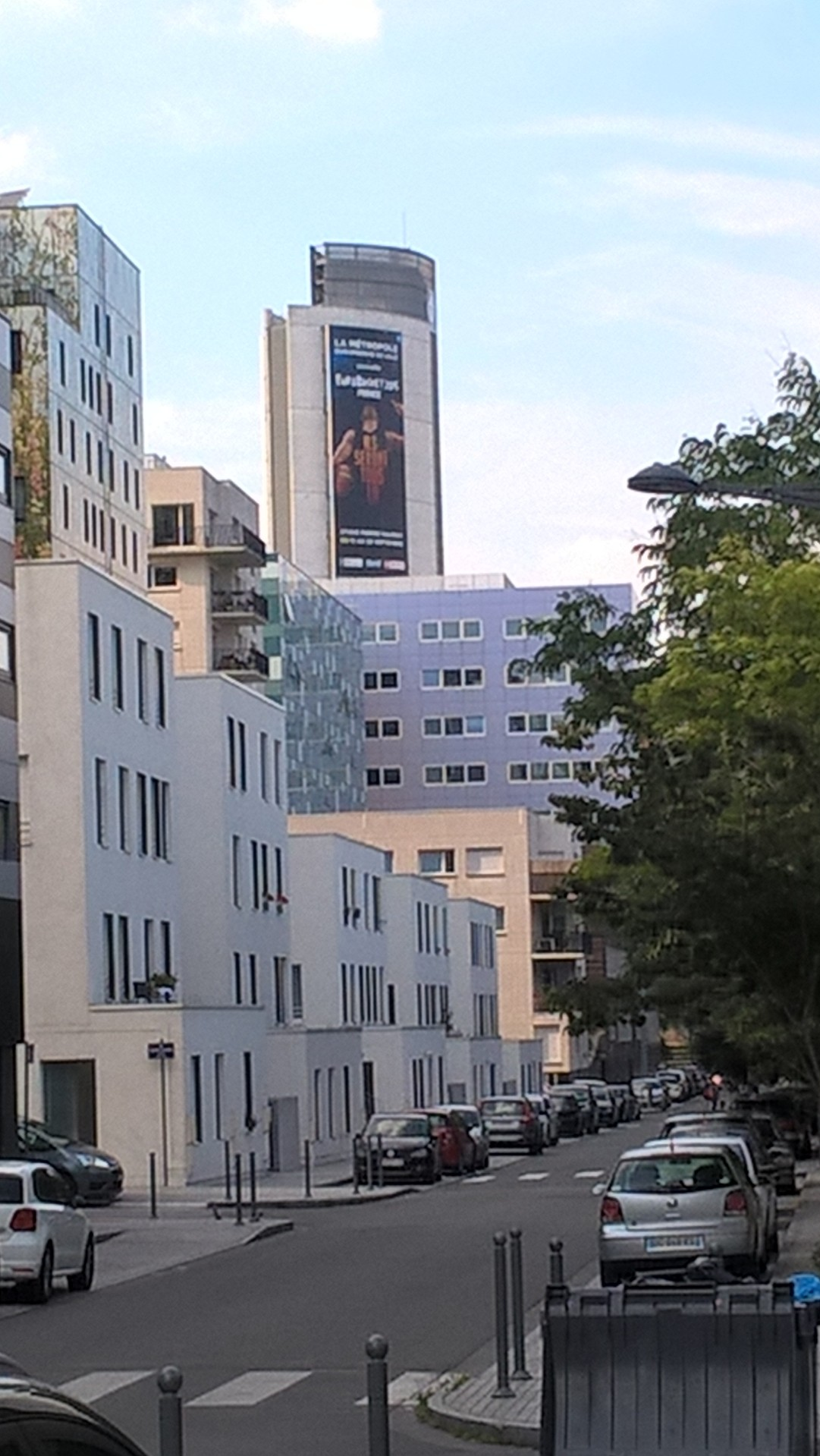
Publicity onto the North Regional Council in Lille.

The draw took place on 8 December 2014 at 16:00 at Disneyland in Paris, France. Criteria for the draw was as follows:

- The four hosts were drawn together, but as Latvia were amongst the third seeded teams and Germany the fifth, only three teams would be in fourth and sixth pot containing the remaining seeds and these teams could not be drawn into groups with Latvia and Germany respectively.
- France and Croatia, as hosts, were drawn first and the two remaining first seeds, Spain and Lithuania, were drawn separately into the remaining two groups not already with a top-seeded team.
- In addition to this, following on from the exceptional circumstances leading to the relocation of EuroBasket 2015, each of the four hosts was granted the right to select a partner federation for commercial and marketing criteria. These teams would automatically be placed into the same group as their chosen partner country. The selections were;
  - France and Finland
  - Germany and Turkey
  - Croatia and Slovenia
  - Latvia and Estonia

Pot 1 (Hosts)	Pot 2 (Remaining First Seeds)	Pot 3 (Second Seeds)	Pot 4 (Remaining Third Seeds)	Pot 5 (Fourth Seeds)	Pot 6 (Remaining Fifth Seeds)	Pot 7 (Sixth Seeds)
Croatia; France; Germany; Latvia	Lithuania; Spain	Slovenia ^{c} Ukraine; Serbia; Finland ^{a}	Greece; Turkey ^{b} Bosnia and Herzegovina	Poland; Belgium; Macedonia; Italy	Israel; Czech Republic; Georgia	Netherlands; Russia; Iceland; Estonia ^{d}

^a Assigned to Group A, for its partnership with France.
^b Assigned to Group B, for its partnership with Germany.
^c Assigned to Group C, for its partnership with Croatia.
^d Assigned to Group D, for its partnership with Latvia.

== Preliminary round ==
The best four teams of each group advance to the knockout stage.

=== Group A ===
Venue: Montpellier, France

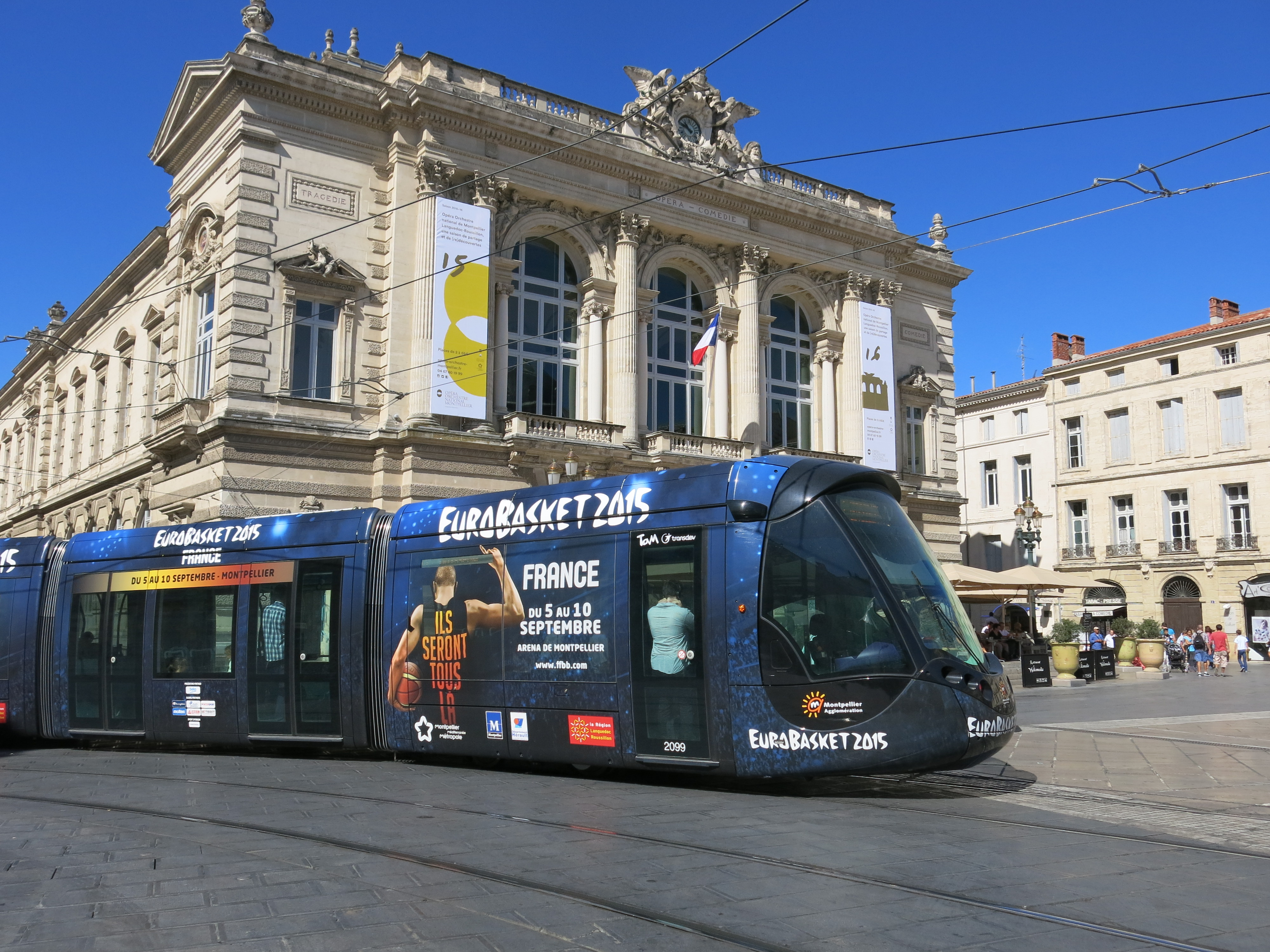
Tram painted to promote the EuroBasket 2015 in Montpellier

Pos	Team	Pld	W	L	PF	PA	PD	Pts	Qualification
1	France	5	5	0	407	335	+72	10	Advanced to Knockout stage
2	Israel	5	3	2	375	384	−9	8 (Note: Poland–Israel 73–75)	Advanced to Knockout stage
3	Poland	5	3	2	367	352	+15	8	Advanced to Knockout stage
4	Finland	5	2	3	387	392	−5	7	Advanced to Knockout stage
5	Russia	5	1	4	379	374	+5	6 (Note: Bosnia and Herzegovina–Russia 61–81)	
6	Bosnia and Herzegovina	5	1	4	324	402	−78	6	

Source: eurobasket2015.org
Rules for classification: 1) Points; 2) Head-to-head results; 3) Points difference; 4) Points scored.
Notes:

5 September 2015
Poland	68–64		Bosnia and Herzegovina
Israel	76–73		Russia
France	97–87	(OT)	Finland
6 September 2015
Russia	79–82		Poland
Finland	66–79		Israel
Bosnia and Herzegovina	54–81		France
7 September 2015
Finland	81–79		Russia
Israel	84–86	(OT)	Bosnia and Herzegovina
France	69–66		Poland
9 September 2015
Bosnia and Herzegovina	59–88		Finland
Poland	73–75		Israel
Russia	67–74		France
10 September 2015
Finland	65–78		Poland
Bosnia and Herzegovina	61–81		Russia
Israel	61–86		France

=== Group B ===
Venue: Berlin, Germany

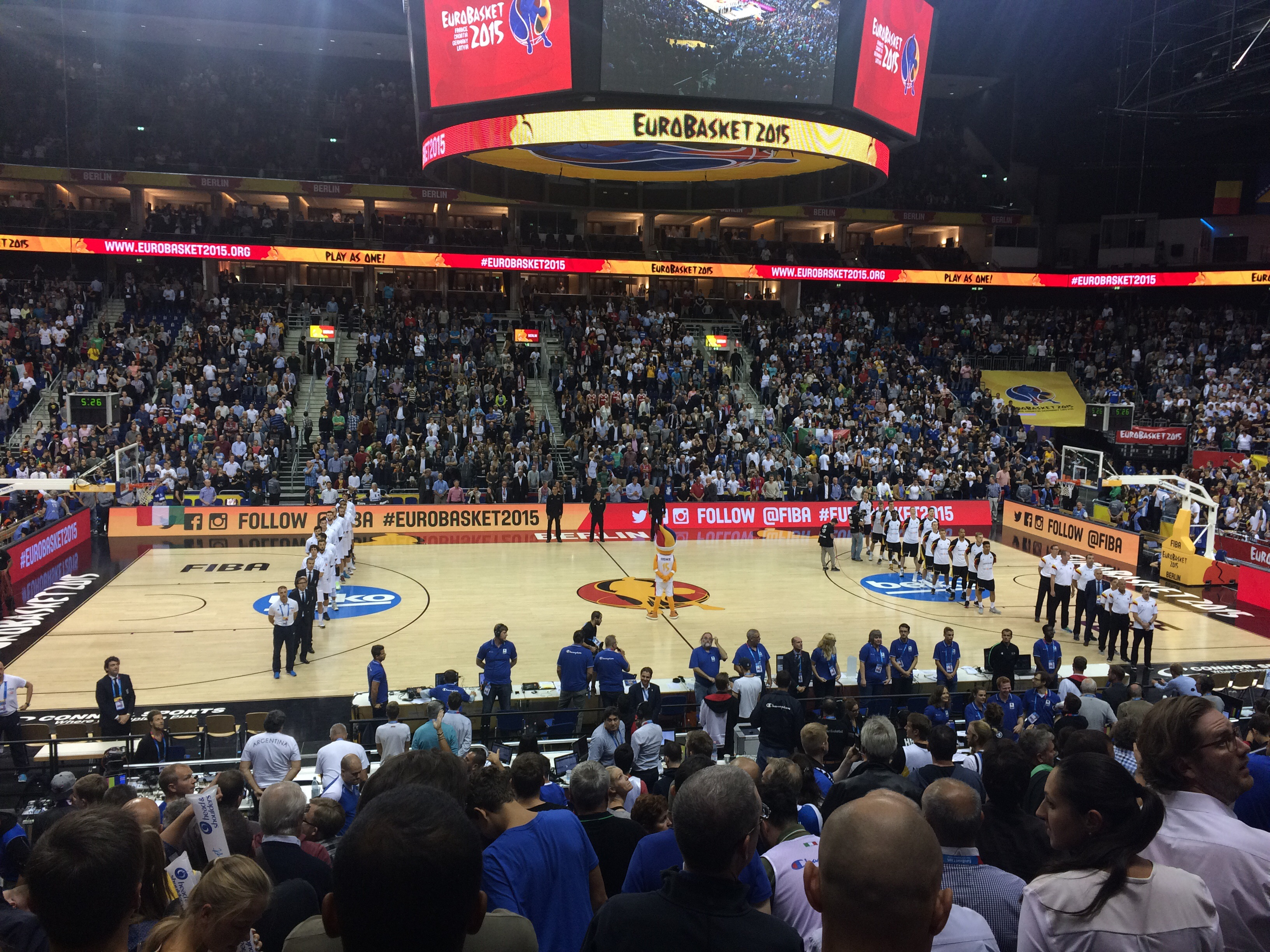
Italy and Germany during the national anthems.

Pos	Team	Pld	W	L	PF	PA	PD	Pts	Qualification
1	Serbia	5	5	0	433	354	+79	10	Advanced to Knockout stage
2	Spain	5	3	2	448	411	+37	8 (Note: Spain 1–1, +20; Italy 1–1, +5; Turkey 1–1 −25)	Advanced to Knockout stage
3	Italy	5	3	2	434	434	0	8	Advanced to Knockout stage
4	Turkey	5	3	2	429	459	−30	8	Advanced to Knockout stage
5	Germany	5	1	4	370	379	−9	6	
6	Iceland	5	0	5	368	445	−77	5	

Source: eurobasket2015.org
Rules for classification: 1) Points; 2) Head-to-head results; 3) Points difference; 4) Points scored.
Notes:

5 September 2015
Germany	71–65		Iceland
Spain	70–80		Serbia
Italy	87–89		Turkey
6 September 2015
Serbia	68–66		Germany
Iceland	64–71		Italy
Turkey	77–104		Spain
8 September 2015
Serbia	93–64		Iceland
Germany	75–80		Turkey
Spain	98–105		Italy
9 September 2015
Turkey	72–91		Serbia
Italy	89–82	(OT)	Germany
Iceland	73–99		Spain
10 September 2015
Serbia	101–82		Italy
Germany	76–77		Spain
Turkey	111–102	(OT)	Iceland

=== Group C ===
Venue: Zagreb, Croatia

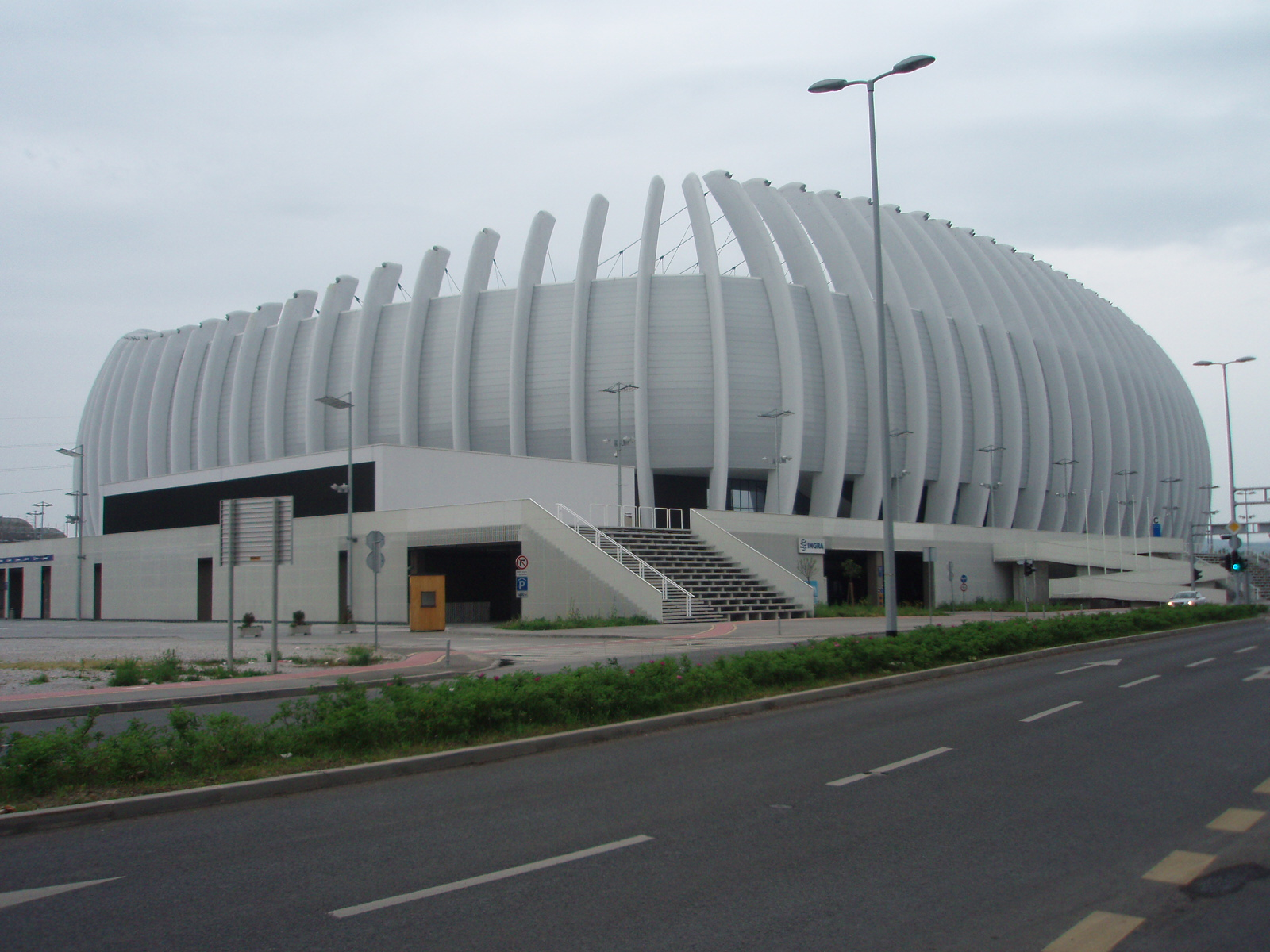
Arena Zagreb ahead of EuroBasket 2015

Pos	Team	Pld	W	L	PF	PA	PD	Pts	Qualification
1	Greece	5	5	0	387	340	+47	10	Advanced to Knockout stage
2	Croatia	5	3	2	359	343	+16	8 (Note: Croatia–Slovenia 80–73)	Advanced to Knockout stage
3	Slovenia	5	3	2	367	356	+11	8	Advanced to Knockout stage
4	Georgia	5	2	3	369	364	+5	7	Advanced to Knockout stage
5	Macedonia	5	1	4	324	381	−57	6 (Note: Netherlands–Macedonia 71–78)	
6	Netherlands	5	1	4	355	377	−22	6	

Source: eurobasket2015.org
Rules for classification: 1) Points; 2) Head-to-head results; 3) Points difference; 4) Points scored.
Notes:

5 September 2015
Georgia	72–73	Netherlands
Macedonia	65–85	Greece
Croatia	80–73	Slovenia
6 September 2015
Netherlands	71–78	Macedonia
Slovenia	79–68	Georgia
Greece	72–70	Croatia
8 September 2015
Slovenia	81–74	Netherlands
Georgia	68–79	Greece
Croatia	73–55	Macedonia
9 September 2015
Greece	83–72	Slovenia
Macedonia	75–90	Georgia
Netherlands	72–78	Croatia
10 September 2015
Slovenia	62–51	Macedonia
Georgia	71–58	Croatia
Greece	68–65	Netherlands

=== Group D ===
Venue: Riga, Latvia

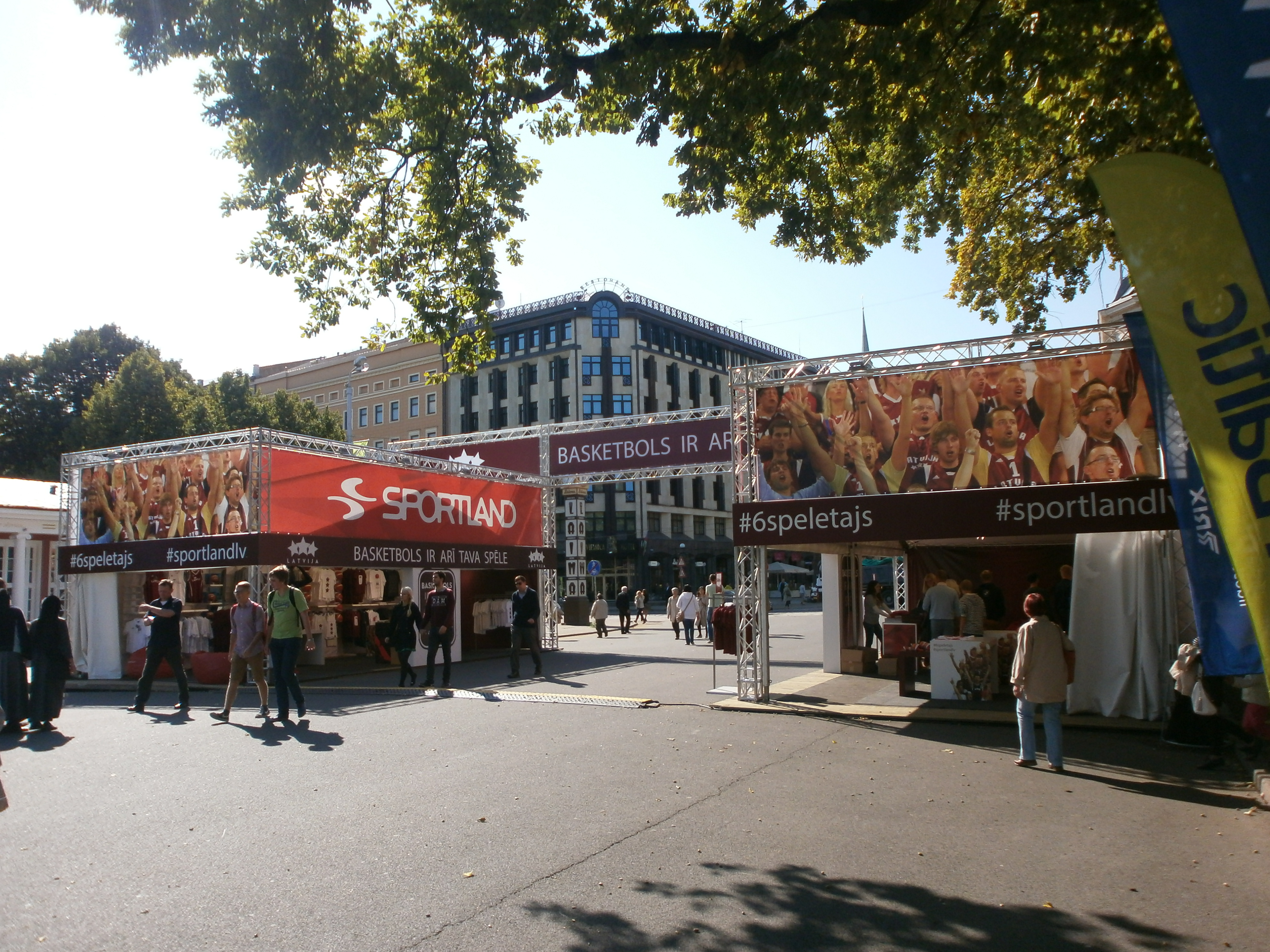
EuroBasket 2015 fanzone in Riga

Pos	Team	Pld	W	L	PF	PA	PD	Pts	Qualification
1	Lithuania	5	4	1	360	336	+24	9	Advanced to Knockout stage
2	Latvia	5	3	2	348	339	+9	8 (Note: Latvia 2–0; Czech Republic 1–1; Belgium 0–2)	Advanced to Knockout stage
3	Czech Republic	5	3	2	370	342	+28	8	Advanced to Knockout stage
4	Belgium	5	3	2	370	344	+26	8	Advanced to Knockout stage
5	Estonia	5	1	4	316	374	−58	6 (Note: Ukraine–Estonia 71–78)	
6	Ukraine	5	1	4	349	378	−29	6	

Source: eurobasket2015.org
Rules for classification: 1) Points; 2) Head-to-head results; 3) Points difference; 4) Points scored.
Notes:

5 September 2015
Czech Republic	80–57		Estonia
Belgium	67–78		Latvia
Lithuania	69–68		Ukraine
6 September 2015
Estonia	55–84		Belgium
Latvia	49–68		Lithuania
Ukraine	64–78		Czech Republic
7 September 2015
Lithuania	74–76		Belgium
Czech Republic	65–72		Latvia
Ukraine	71–78		Estonia
9 September 2015
Belgium	64–66		Czech Republic
Latvia	74–75		Ukraine
Estonia	62–64		Lithuania
10 September 2015
Ukraine	71–79		Belgium
Latvia	75–64		Estonia
Czech Republic	81–85	(OT)	Lithuania

== Knockout stage ==
Venue: Lille, France

Round of 16
12 September
France	76
Turkey	53
12 September
Latvia	73
Slovenia	66
12 September
Spain	80
Poland	66
12 September
Greece	75
Belgium	54
13 September
Serbia	94
Finland	81
13 September
Croatia	59
Czech Republic	80
13 September
Israel	52
Italy	82
13 September
Lithuania	85
Georgia	81

Quarterfinals
15 September
France	84
Latvia	70
15 September
Spain	73
Greece	71
16 September
Serbia	89
Czech Republic	75
16 September
Italy	85
Lithuania (OT)	95

Semifinals
17 September
France	75
Spain (OT)	80
18 September
Serbia	64
Lithuania	67

Final
20 September
Spain	80
Lithuania	63
Third place game
20 September
France	81
Serbia	68

Olympic qualifying bracket

The winners of the 5–8th place semifinals advanced to the qualification tournament. The 5–8th place semifinals losers played in the seventh place game to determine the last participant.

5–8th place semifinals
17 September
Greece	97
Latvia	90
17 September
Czech Republic	70
Italy	85

Seventh place game
18 September
Latvia	70
Czech Republic	97

=== Final ===
20 September 2015
19:00

Boxscore

Spain	80–63	Lithuania
Scoring by quarter: 19–8, 22–25, 19–10, 20–20
Pts: Gasol 25; Rebs: Gasol 12; Asts: Rodríguez 6		Pts: Kalnietis, Seibutis 13; Rebs: Valančiūnas 9 Asts: Kalnietis 5

Stade Pierre-Mauroy, Lille
Attendance: 27,372
Referees: Luigi Lamonica (Italy), Ilija Belošević (Serbia), Borys Ryzhyk (Ukraine)

EuroBasket 2015 champions

Spain
Third title

Most Valuable Player
(Spain) Pau Gasol

== Final standings ==
Official final ranking by FIBA Europe.

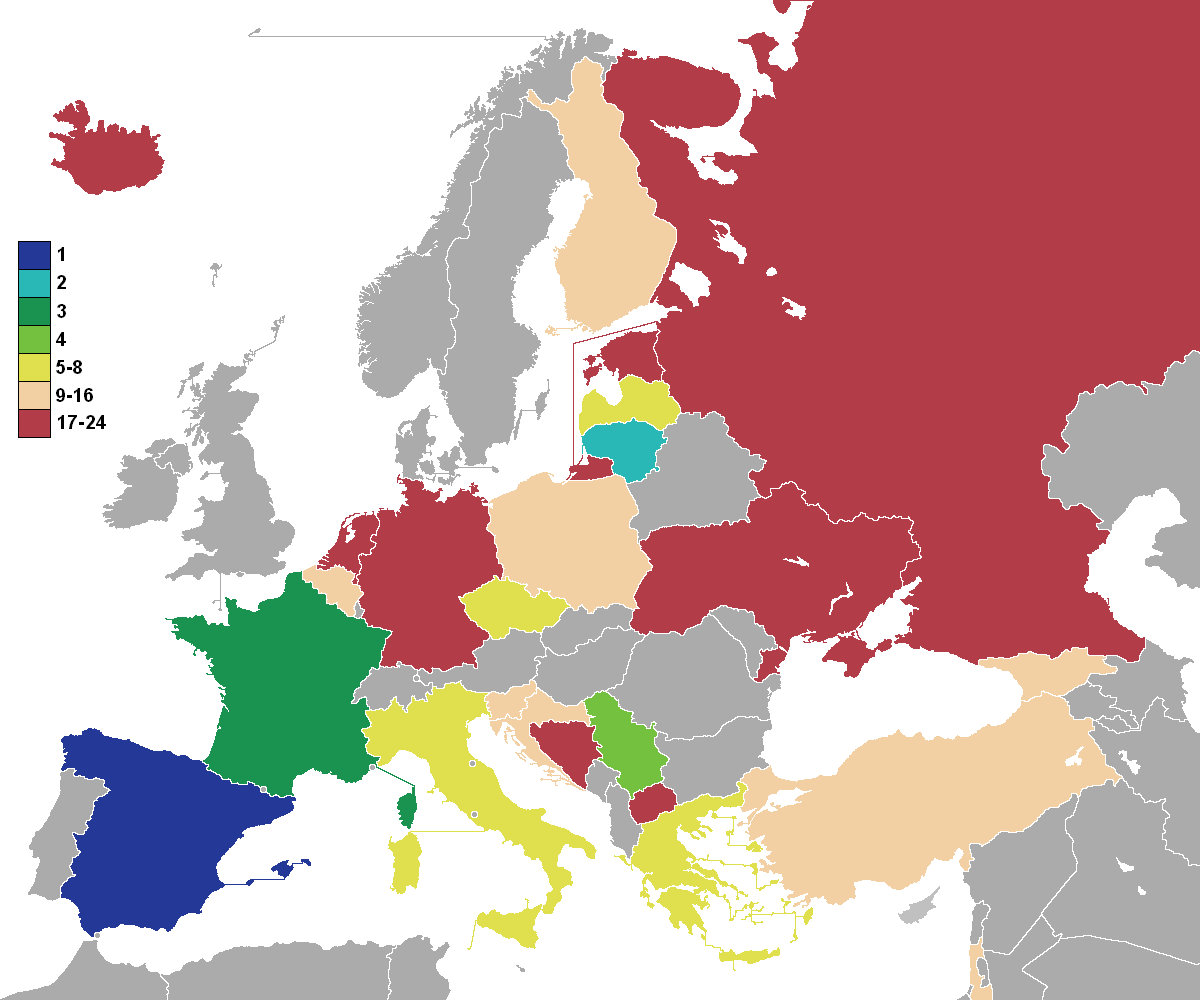
Results

Qualified for the 2016 Summer Olympics
Qualified to Final Olympic Qualifying Tournament as hosts (Note: If the tournament is hosted by a team that has already qualified, the next-best team from the host country's federation will also qualify.)
Qualified to Final Olympic Qualifying Tournament (Turkey qualified as a replacement invitee)

Rank	Team	Record	FIBA World Rankings		
Rank	Team	Record	Before	After	Change
1st place, gold medalist(s)	Spain	7–2	2	2	=0
2nd place, silver medalist(s)	Lithuania	7–2	4	3	+1
3rd place, bronze medalist(s)	France	8–1	5	5	=0
4	Serbia	7–2	7	6	+1
5	Greece	7–1	10	10	=0
6	Italy	5–3	36	T-35	+1
7	Czech Republic	5–4	T-49	42	+7
8	Latvia	4–5	T-38	T-35	+3
9	Croatia	3–3	12	12	=0
10	Israel	3–3	T-38	37	+1
11	Poland	3–3	42	T-38	+4
12	Slovenia	3–3	13	13	=0
13	Belgium	3–3	T-51	44	+7
14	Turkey	3–3	8	8	=0
15	Georgia	2–4	54	47	+7
16	Finland	2–4	35	32	+3
17	Russia	1–4	6	7	–1
18	Germany	1–4	18	20	–2
19	Macedonia	1–4	32	34	–2
20	Estonia	1–4	NR	T-84	+4
21	Netherlands	1–4	NR	T-84	+4
22	Ukraine	1–4	40	T-38	+2
23	Bosnia and Herzegovina	1–4	T-58	T-53	+5
24	Iceland	0–5	NR	T-84	+4

== All-Tournament Team ==
- PG – (Spain) Sergio Rodríguez
- SG – (France) Nando de Colo
- SF – (Lithuania) Jonas Mačiulis
- PF – (Spain) Pau Gasol (MVP)
- C – (Lithuania) Jonas Valančiūnas

== Statistical leaders ==
Points

Name	PPG
(Spain) Pau Gasol	25.6
(Germany) Dennis Schröder	21.0
(Czech Republic) Jan Veselý	19.3
(Italy) Danilo Gallinari	17.9
(Italy) Alessandro Gentile	16.8

Rebounds

Name	RPG
(Russia) Andrey Vorontsevich	9.2
(Czech Republic) Jan Veselý	9.1
(Ukraine) Kyrylo Fesenko	8.8
(Spain) Pau Gasol	8.8
(Lithuania) Jonas Valančiūnas	8.4

Assists

Name	APG
(Lithuania) Mantas Kalnietis	7.8
(Czech Republic) Tomáš Satoranský	7.3
(Serbia) Miloš Teodosić	7.1
(Finland) Petteri Koponen	6.0
(Russia) Dmitry Khvostov	6.0
(Germany) Dennis Schröder	6.0

Blocks

Name	BPG
(Spain) Pau Gasol	2.3
(France) Rudy Gobert	2.0
(Israel) D'or Fischer	1.8
(Lithuania) Jonas Valančiūnas	1.4
(Finland) Erik Murphy	1.3

Steals

Name	SPG
(Lithuania) Jonas Mačiulis	1.9
(Israel) Yogev Ohayon	1.7
(Georgia (country)) Tornike Shengelia	1.7
(Bosnia and Herzegovina) Alex Renfroe	1.6
(France) Nicolas Batum	1.4

== FIBA broadcasting rights ==
Country	Broadcaster
Albania	TVSH
Albania	Digit-Alb
Argentina	DirecTV
Belgium	Be TV
Belgium	TELENET
Bosnia and Herzegovina	FTV
Bosnia and Herzegovina	RTRS
Brazil	SporTV
Brazil	ESPN Brasil
Bulgaria	Diema Sport
China	CCTV-5
Colombia	DirecTV
Croatia	HRT
Cyprus	CYTA
Czech Republic	Czech Television
Denmark	Viasat Sport
Estonia	Viasat Sport Baltic
Estonia	TV6
Finland	Viasat Sport
Finland	Yle
France	Canal+ Sport
France	France Télévisions
Georgia	GPB
Germany	Das Erste
Germany	ZDF
Germany	Deutsche Telekom
Greece	ANT1
Greece	Cosmote Sport
Hong Kong	i-Cable
Iceland	RÚV
India	NEO Sports
Iran	IRIB Varzesh
Israel	Sport 5
Italy	Sky Italia
Japan	Fuji TV
Latvia	LNT
Latvia	Viasat Sport Baltic
Lithuania	TV3
Lithuania	Viasat Sport Baltic
Lithuania	LRT Radijas
Macedonia	Sitel
Malaysia	Astro
Montenegro	TV Vijesti
Netherlands	Sport1
Norway	Viasat Sport
Philippines	Solar
Philippines	Basketball TV
Poland	TVP
Poland	Eleven Sports Network
Portugal	Sport TV
Qatar	beIN Sports Arabia
Romania	Digi Sport
Russia	Russia 2
Russia	NTV Plus
Serbia	RTS
Singapore	StarHub
Slovakia	RTVS
Slovenia	RTV Slovenija
Slovenia	Šport TV
South Africa	SuperSport
Spain	Cuatro
Spain	Telecinco
Spain	Energy
Sweden	TV10
Sweden	Viasat Sport
Turkey	NTV Spor
Ukraine	2+2
USA	ESPN3
