= EuroBasket 2015 Group B =

Group B of the EuroBasket 2015 took place between 5 and 10 September 2015. The group played all of its games at Mercedes-Benz Arena in Berlin, Germany.

The group was composed of Germany, Iceland, Italy, Serbia, Spain and Turkey. The four best ranked teams advanced to the second round. The group was considered as the toughest group in the tournament.

== Standings ==
Pos	Team	Pld	W	L	PF	PA	PD	Pts	Qualification
1	Serbia	5	5	0	433	354	+79	10	Advanced to Knockout stage
2	Spain	5	3	2	448	411	+37	8 (Note: Spain 1–1, +20; Italy 1–1, +5; Turkey 1–1 −25)	Advanced to Knockout stage
3	Italy	5	3	2	434	434	0	8	Advanced to Knockout stage
4	Turkey	5	3	2	429	459	−30	8	Advanced to Knockout stage
5	Germany	5	1	4	370	379	−9	6	
6	Iceland	5	0	5	368	445	−77	5	

Source: eurobasket2015.org
Rules for classification: 1) Points; 2) Head-to-head results; 3) Points difference; 4) Points scored.
Notes:

All times are local (UTC+2).

== 5 September ==
=== Germany v Iceland ===
5 September 2015
15:00

Boxscore

Germany	71–65	Iceland
Scoring by quarter: 20–14, 21–12, 18–17, 12–22
Pts: Nowitzki, Schröder 15; Rebs: Nowitzki, Zipser 7 Asts: Schröder 4		Pts: Stefánsson 23; Rebs: Bæringsson 8 Asts: Stefánsson 5

Mercedes-Benz Arena, Berlin
Attendance: 12,500
Referees: Sreten Radović (CRO), Aare Halliko (EST), Miloš Koljenšić (MNE)

=== Spain v Serbia ===
5 September 2015
18:00

Boxscore

Spain	70–80	Serbia
Scoring by quarter: 21–11, 15–23, 16–28, 18–18
Pts: Gasol 16; Rebs: Mirotić 10; Asts: Llull 6		Pts: Bjelica 24; Rebs: Bjelica 10; Asts: Bogdanović 5

Mercedes-Benz Arena, Berlin
Attendance: 9,750
Referees: Christos Christodoulou (GRE), Sergiy Zashchuk (UKR), Robert Vyklický (CZE)

=== Italy v Turkey ===
5 September 2015
21:00

Boxscore

Italy	87–89	Turkey
Scoring by quarter: 13–26, 29–25, 19–15, 26–23
Pts: Gallinari 33; Rebs: three players 5 Asts: Gentile 5		Pts: Erden 22; Rebs: Erden 8 Asts: Muhammed, Güler 9

Mercedes-Benz Arena, Berlin
Attendance: 10,760
Referees: Borys Ryzhyk (UKR), Sašo Petek (SLO), Tomas Jasevičius (LTU)

== 6 September ==
=== Serbia v Germany ===
6 September 2015
15:00

Boxscore

Serbia	68–66	Germany
Scoring by quarter: 19–18, 20–20, 11–10, 18–18
Pts: Bjelica 12; Rebs: Kuzmić, Nedović 7 Asts: Bogdanović, Teodosić 4		Pts: Nowitzki, Pleiß 15; Rebs: Nowitzki 10; Asts: Schröder 6

Mercedes-Benz Arena, Berlin
Attendance: 13,050
Referees: Borys Ryzhyk (UKR), Aare Halliko (EST), Tomas Jasevičius (LTU)

=== Iceland v Italy ===
6 September 2015
18:00

Boxscore

Iceland	64–71	Italy
Scoring by quarter: 21–22, 16–19, 11–11, 16–19
Pts: Pálsson 17; Rebs: Bæringsson 7 Asts: Stefánsson 6		Pts: Gentile 21; Rebs: Gallinari 10; Asts: Gentile 4

Mercedes-Benz Arena, Berlin
Attendance: 4,100
Referees: Christos Christodoulou (GRE), Sergiy Zashchuk (UKR), Igor Mitrovski (MKD)

=== Turkey v Spain ===
6 September 2015
21:00

Boxscore

Turkey	77–104	Spain
Scoring by quarter: 18–24, 20–30, 18–27, 21–23
Pts: İlyasova 15; Rebs: Osman, Savaş 4 Asts: three players 2		Pts: Gasol 21; Rebs: Gasol 7 Asts: Llull, Rodríguez 5

Mercedes-Benz Arena, Berlin
Attendance: 6,750
Referees: Sreten Radović (CRO), Sašo Petek (SLO), Miloš Koljenšić (MNE)

== 8 September ==
=== Serbia v Iceland ===
8 September 2015
14:30

Boxscore

Serbia	93–64	Iceland
Scoring by quarter: 24–16, 18–16, 25–16, 26–16
Pts: Nedović 15; Rebs: Bogdanović 7 Asts: Bogdanović, Teodosić 6		Pts: Gunnarsson 18; Rebs: Sigurðarson 6 Asts: Pálsson, Stefánsson 4

Mercedes-Benz Arena, Berlin
Attendance: 2,800
Referees: Sreten Radović (CRO), Robert Vyklický (CZE), Igor Mitrovski (MKD)

=== Germany v Turkey ===
8 September 2015
17:45

Boxscore

Germany	75–80	Turkey
Scoring by quarter: 11–31, 13–10, 19–19, 32–20
Pts: Schröder 24; Rebs: Nowitzki, Schröder 5 Asts: Schröder 6		Pts: Osman 17; Rebs: Erden 9 Asts: Muhammed 5

Mercedes-Benz Arena, Berlin
Attendance: 13,050
Referees: Christos Christodoulou (GRE), Sergiy Zashchuk (UKR), Miloš Koljenšić (MNE)

=== Spain v Italy ===
8 September 2015
21:00

Boxscore

Spain	98–105	Italy
Scoring by quarter: 20–19, 25–23, 18–31, 35–32
Pts: Gasol 34; Rebs: Gasol 10; Asts: Llull 9		Pts: Gallinari 29; Rebs: Gallinari 8 Asts: Belinelli 7

Mercedes-Benz Arena, Berlin
Attendance: 4,400
Referees: Borys Ryzhyk (UKR), Sašo Petek (SLO), Aare Halliko (EST)

== 9 September ==
=== Turkey v Serbia ===
9 September 2015
14:30

Boxscore

Turkey	72–91	Serbia
Scoring by quarter: 14–30, 21–23, 24–18, 13–20
Pts: Muhammed 16; Rebs: Osman 9 Asts: Güler 6		Pts: Raduljica 20; Rebs: Kuzmić, Raduljica 6 Asts: Teodosić 13

Mercedes-Benz Arena, Berlin
Attendance: 4,400
Referees: Borys Ryzhyk (UKR), Sergiy Zashchuk (UKR), Tomas Jasevičius (LTU)

=== Italy v Germany ===
9 September 2015
17:45

Boxscore

Italy	89–82 (OT)	Germany
Scoring by quarter: 17–22, 25–19, 12–18, 22–17, Overtime: 13–6
Pts: Gallinari 25; Rebs: Aradori, Gallinari 9 Asts: Gentile, Hackett 4		Pts: Schröder 29; Rebs: Nowitzki 10; Asts: Schröder 7

Mercedes-Benz Arena, Berlin
Attendance: 13,050
Referees: Christos Christodoulou (GRE), Sreten Radović (CRO), Miloš Koljenšić (MNE)

=== Iceland v Spain ===
9 September 2015
21:00

Boxscore

Iceland	73–99	Spain
Scoring by quarter: 16–20, 20–21, 19–33, 18–25
Pts: Stefánsson 17; Rebs: Bæringsson 8 Asts: Stefánsson 6		Pts: Mirotić 22; Rebs: Gasol 7 Asts: Rodriguez, San Emeterio 6

Mercedes-Benz Arena, Berlin
Attendance: 4,000
Referees: Sašo Petek (SLO), Robert Vyklický (CZE), Igor Mitrovski (MKD)

== 10 September ==
=== Serbia v Italy ===
10 September 2015
14:30

Boxscore

Serbia	101–82	Italy
Scoring by quarter: 25–19, 23–21, 26–19, 27–23
Pts: Teodosić 26; Rebs: Bjelica 8 Asts: Teodosić 8		Pts: Gentile 19; Rebs: Aradori 6 Asts: Gentile 6

Mercedes-Benz Arena, Berlin
Attendance: 4,185
Referees: Christos Christodoulou (GRE), Sergiy Zashchuk (UKR), Sašo Petek (SLO)

=== Germany v Spain ===
10 September 2015
17:45

Boxscore

Germany	76–77	Spain
Scoring by quarter: 20–18, 18–23, 10–19, 28–17
Pts: Schröder 26; Rebs: Pleiß 10; Asts: Schröder 7		Pts: Rodríguez 19; Rebs: Gasol 11; Asts: Gasol 6

Mercedes-Benz Arena, Berlin
Attendance: 13,050
Referees: Sreten Radović (CRO), Borys Ryzhyk (UKR), Miloš Koljenšić (MNE)

=== Turkey v Iceland ===
10 September 2015
21:00

Boxscore

Turkey	111–102 (OT)	Iceland
Scoring by quarter: 29–22, 18–25, 27–20, 17–24, Overtime: 20–11
Pts: Muhammed 28; Rebs: Muhammed 12; Asts: İlyasova, Osman 6		Pts: Sigurðarson 22; Rebs: Bæringsson 8 Asts: Stefánsson 8

Mercedes-Benz Arena, Berlin
Attendance: 3,850
Referees: Robert Vyklický (CZE), Tomas Jasevičius (LTU), Aare Halliko (EST)
