= Erik Murphy =

Finnish-American basketball player (born 1990)

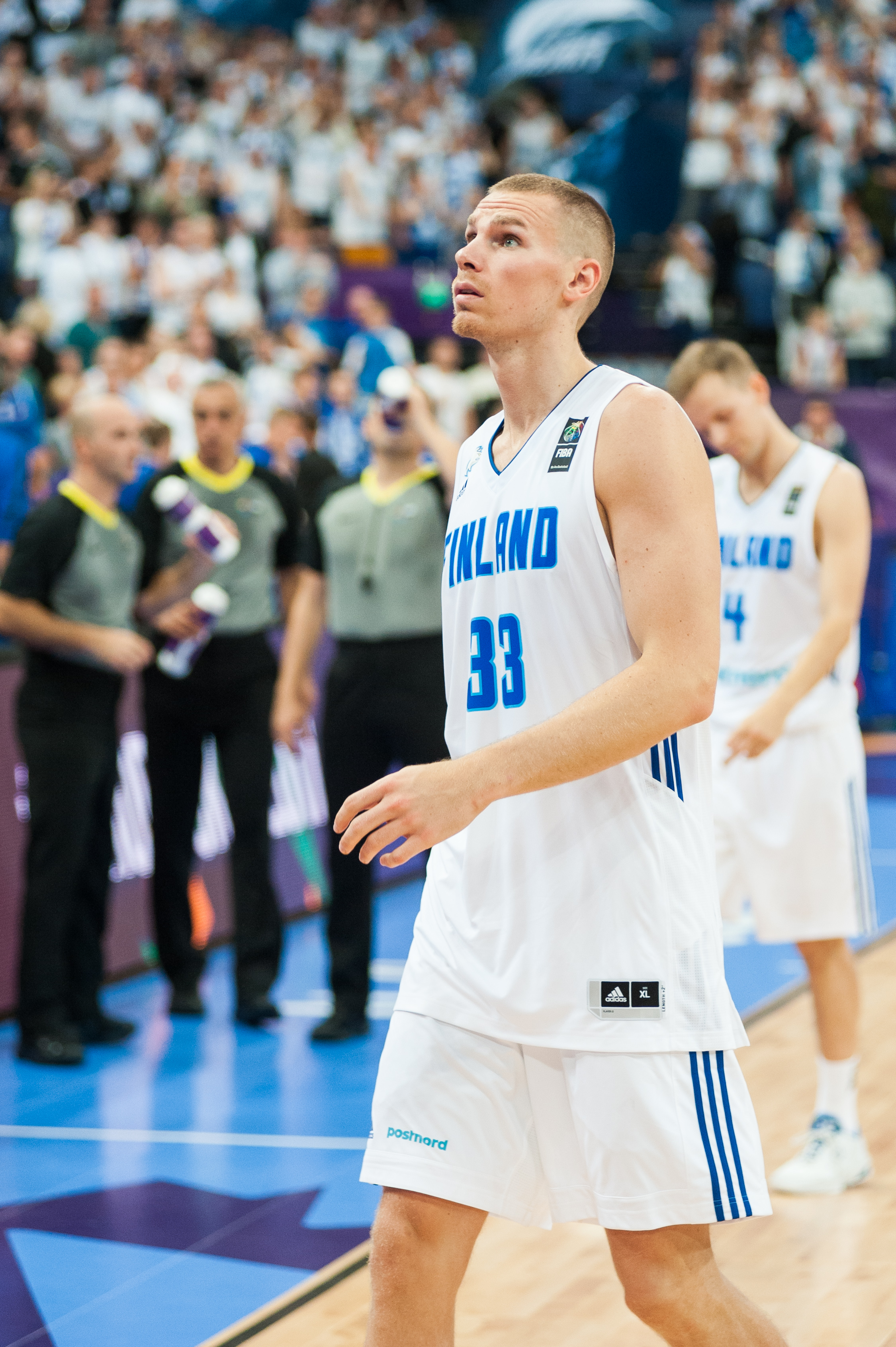
- Murphy during EuroBasket 2017

Free agent
- Position: Power forward

Personal information
- Born: October 26, 1990 (age 36) Lyon, France
- Listed height: 6 ft 10 in (2.08 m)
- Listed weight: 225 lb (102 kg)

Career information
- High school: St. Mark's (Southborough, Massachusetts)
- College: Florida (2009–2013)
- NBA draft: 2013: 2nd round, 49th overall pick
- Drafted by: Chicago Bulls
- Playing career: 2013–present

Career history
- 2013–2014: Chicago Bulls
- 2014–2015: Austin Spurs
- 2015: Beşiktaş
- 2016: Büyükçekmece
- 2016–2017: SIG Strasbourg
- 2017–2018: Nanterre 92
- 2018: Oklahoma City Blue
- 2018–2019: Skyliners Frankfurt
- 2019: Manresa
- 2020–2023: Fukushima Firebonds
- 2023: Gunma Crane Thunders
- 2024: Sendai 89ers
- 2024: Kawasaki Brave Thunders

Career highlights
- First-team All-SEC (2013); Fourth-team Parade All-American (2009)
- Stats at NBA.com
- Stats at Basketball Reference

Erik Murphy (born October 26, 1990) is a French-born Finnish-American professional basketball player for the Kawasaki Brave Thunders of the Japanese B1 league. Drafted by the Chicago Bulls in 2013, he also represents the Finnish national team.

== High school career ==
Murphy played high school basketball at St. Mark's School in Southborough, Massachusetts.

Considered a four-star recruit by Rivals.com, Murphy was listed as the No. 22 power forward and the No. 79 player in the nation in 2009.

== College career ==
Murphy accepted an athletic scholarship to attend the University of Florida in Gainesville, Florida, where he played for coach Billy Donovan's Florida Gators men's basketball team from 2009 to 2013.

Murphy became the 49th Florida Gator to record 1,000 points in his collegiate career and was the only Gator to receive first-team all-conference accolades in 2013. He became a regular in the starting lineup in his junior year and was named to the All-SEC Tournament team in 2012 and 2013.

== Professional career ==
Murphy was selected with the 49th overall pick by the Chicago Bulls in the 2013 NBA draft. On July 10, 2013, he signed his rookie scale contract with the Bulls. On November 6, 2013, Murphy made his NBA debut for the Bulls, playing one minute and not recording any stats. He scored a career-high 2 points on three occasions: December 10, 2013 vs. Milwaukee, December 28, 2013 vs. Dallas, and March 13, 2014, vs. Houston. On April 3, 2014, he was waived by the Bulls. On April 5, 2014, the Utah Jazz claimed him off waivers.

On July 22, 2014, Murphy was traded, along with John Lucas III and Malcolm Thomas, to the Cleveland Cavaliers in exchange for Carrick Felix, a 2015 second-round draft pick and cash considerations. On September 25, 2014, he was traded, along with John Lucas III, Dwight Powell, Malcolm Thomas, and the Cavaliers' 2016 and 2017 second-round picks, to the Boston Celtics in exchange for Keith Bogans and two future second-round picks. On October 27, 2014, he was waived by the Celtics.

On November 1, 2014, Murphy was selected by the Austin Spurs with the third overall pick in the 2014 NBA D-League draft.

On July 4, 2015, Murphy signed with Beşiktaş of the Turkish Basketball Super League for the 2015–16 season. In late December 2015, he left Beşiktaş. On January 4, 2016, he signed with Demir İnşaat Büyükçekmece for the rest of the season.

On June 26, 2016, Murphy signed with Strasbourg IG of the LNB Pro A for the 2016–17 season. He will join Finnish national coach Henrik Dettman who reached an agreement with the Strasbourg IG earlier.

On July 28, 2017, Murphy signed with Nanterre 92 for the 2017–18 season.

On February 11, 2018, Murphy signed with New Basket Brindisi of the Italian LBA, but didn't play for them. On March 17, he signed with the Oklahoma City Blue of the NBA G League. He signed a three-month deal, with an option for the remainder of the season, with the Skyliners Frankfurt of the German Basketball Bundesliga on August 28, 2018.

On January 28, 2019, he has signed with Baxi Manresa of the Spanish Liga ACB.

Murphy played three seasons for Fukushima Firebonds in the B2 league, second-tier in Japan, before signing with Gunma Crane Thunders in the Japanese B1 league on 25 October 2023, on a one-year deal.

== National team career ==
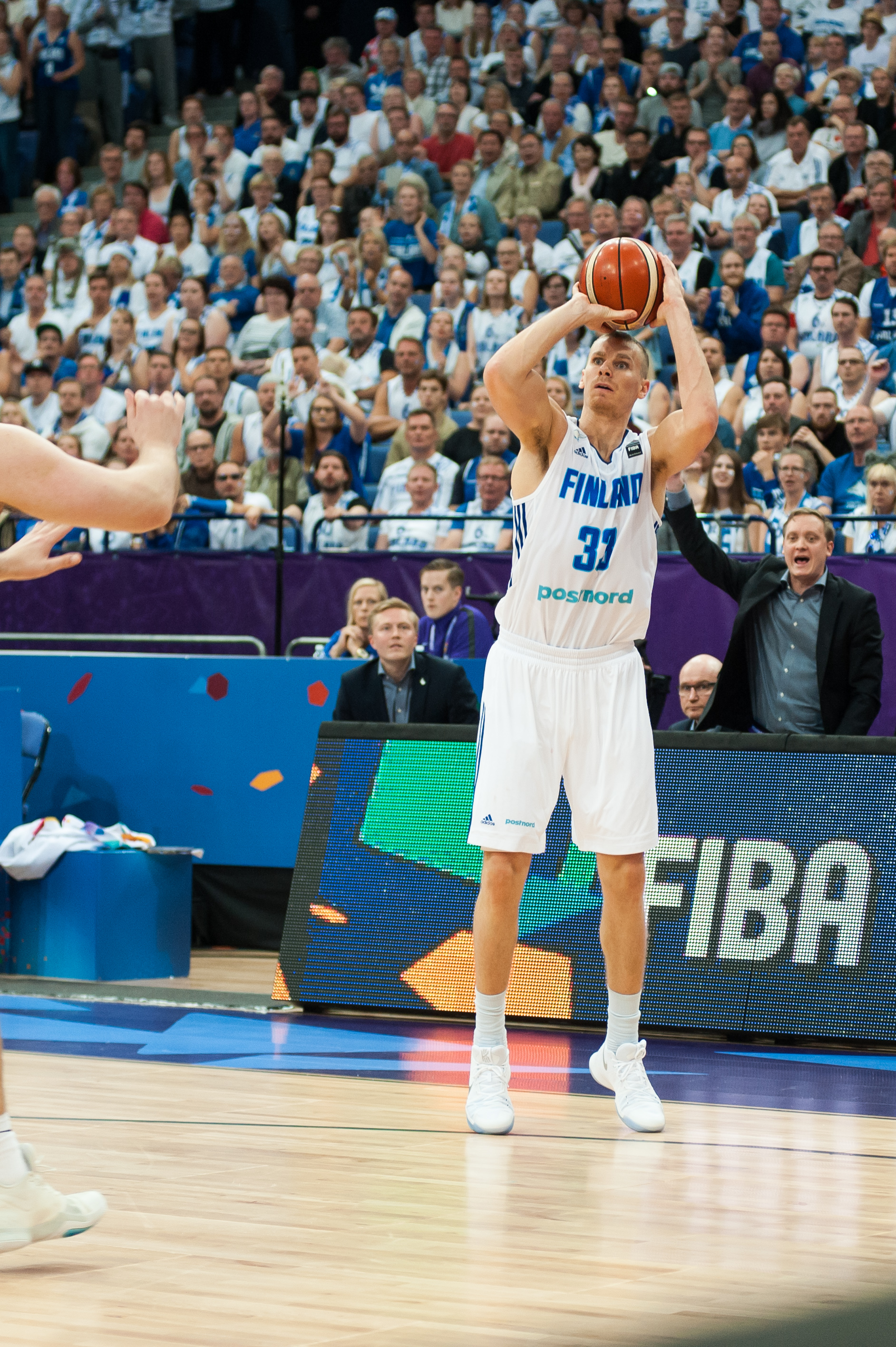
Murphy shooting a three-point field goal during EuroBasket 2017

Murphy made his debut for the Finnish national team in August 2014 in a friendly match against Lithuania. He recorded nine points and five rebounds in his debut appearance. He later played in the 2014 FIBA Basketball World Cup where Finland's campaign was ended at the group stages; Murphy averaged 6.8 points over five games. He represented Finland again at EuroBasket 2015, helping his team advance from the group stage.

== Personal life ==
Murphy's father, Jay Murphy, is a former NBA player. His mother, Päivi, from whom he gained a Finnish citizenship by birth, played for the Finland women's national basketball team from 1988 to 1994. His younger brother Alex Murphy also played at Florida.

He holds both American and Finnish passports.

== Career statistics ==
Legend
GP	Games played	GS	Games started	MPG	Minutes per game
FG%	Field goal percentage	3P%	3-point field goal percentage	FT%	Free throw percentage
RPG	Rebounds per game	APG	Assists per game	SPG	Steals per game
BPG	Blocks per game	PPG	Points per game	**Bold**	Career high

=== NBA ===
Year	Team	GP	GS	MPG	FG%	3P%	FT%	RPG	APG	SPG	BPG	PPG
2013–14	Chicago	24	0	2.6	.231	.000	.000	.3	.1	.0	.2	.3
Career		24	0	2.6	.231	.000	.000	.3	.1	.0	.2	.3

=== EuroCup ===
Year	Team	GP	GS	MPG	FG%	3P%	FT%	RPG	APG	SPG	BPG	PPG	PIR
2015–16	Beşiktaş	9	**6**	**22.1**	.382	.289	.750	**4.6**	**.8**	**.6**	**.9**	7.7	6.3
2018–19	Skyliners Frankfurt	**12**	5	21.7	**.598**	**.641**	**.826**	3.3	**.8**	.4	**.9**	**13.8**	**13.2**
Career		21	11	21.9	.512	0.468	0.806	3.9	.8	.5	.9	11.2	10.3

=== National team ===
Team	Tournament	Pos.	GP	PPG	RPG	APG
Finland	2014 FIBA World Cup	22nd	5	6.8	5.4	0.2
Finland	EuroBasket 2015	16th	6	13.2	7.7	1.3
Finland	EuroBasket 2017	11th	6	4.5	2.7	0.8
