= EuroBasket 2015 Group D =

Group D of the EuroBasket 2015 took place between 5 and 10 September 2015. The group played all of its games at Arena Riga in Riga, Latvia.

The group is composed of Belgium, Czech Republic, Estonia, Latvia, Lithuania and Ukraine. The four best ranked teams advanced to the second round.

== Standings ==
Pos	Team	Pld	W	L	PF	PA	PD	Pts	Qualification
1	Lithuania	5	4	1	360	336	+24	9	Advanced to Knockout stage
2	Latvia	5	3	2	348	339	+9	8 (Note: Latvia 2–0; Czech Republic 1–1; Belgium 0–2)	Advanced to Knockout stage
3	Czech Republic	5	3	2	370	342	+28	8	Advanced to Knockout stage
4	Belgium	5	3	2	370	344	+26	8	Advanced to Knockout stage
5	Estonia	5	1	4	316	374	−58	6 (Note: Ukraine–Estonia 71–78)	
6	Ukraine	5	1	4	349	378	−29	6	

Source: eurobasket2015.org
Rules for classification: 1) Points; 2) Head-to-head results; 3) Points difference; 4) Points scored.
Notes:

All times are local (UTC+3).

== 5 September ==
=== Czech Republic v Estonia ===
5 September 2015
15:30

Boxscore

Czech Republic	80–57	Estonia
Scoring by quarter: 18–9, 25–15, 21–11, 16–22
Pts: Veselý 16; Rebs: Veselý 8 Asts: four players 3		Pts: Vene 18; Rebs: Vene 13; Asts: three players 2

Arena Riga, Riga
Attendance: 5,142
Referees: Ilija Belošević (SRB), Amit Balak (ISR), Saverio Lanzarini (ITA)

=== Belgium v Latvia ===
5 September 2015
18:30

Boxscore

Belgium	67–78	Latvia
Scoring by quarter: 19–25, 19–15, 14–11, 15–27
Pts: Hervelle 13; Rebs: De Zeeuw, Hervelle 6 Asts: Hervelle 7		Pts: Meiers 15; Rebs: Freimanis, Timma 5 Asts: Strēlnieks 7

Arena Riga, Riga
Attendance: 8,217
Referees: Emilio Pérez Pizarro (ESP), Emin Moğulkoç (TUR), Marcin Kowalski (POL)

=== Lithuania v Ukraine ===
5 September 2015
21:30

Boxscore

Lithuania	69–68	Ukraine
Scoring by quarter: 19–12, 14–14, 17–19, 19–23
Pts: Jankūnas 22; Rebs: Valančiūnas 11; Asts: Kalnietis 7		Pts: Fesenko 19; Rebs: Fesenko 11; Asts: Randle 6

Arena Riga, Riga
Attendance: 8,846
Referees: Milivoje Jovčić (SRB), Eddie Viator (FRA), Sigmundur Herbertsson (ISL)

== 6 September ==
=== Estonia v Belgium ===
6 September 2015
15:30

Boxscore

Estonia	55–84	Belgium
Scoring by quarter: 9–27, 9–19, 26–23, 11–15
Pts: Vene 12; Rebs: Veideman 8 Asts: S. Sokk 4		Pts: Lojeski 16; Rebs: Hervelle, Lojeski 6 Asts: Tabu 4

Arena Riga, Riga
Attendance: 5,142
Referees: Eddie Viator (FRA), Milivoje Jovčić (SRB), Marcin Kowalski (POL)

=== Latvia v Lithuania ===
6 September 2015
18:30

Boxscore

Latvia	49–68	Lithuania
Scoring by quarter: 19–13, 9–16, 11–20, 10–19
Pts: Bērziņš, Freimanis 8 Rebs: Freimanis 9 Asts: Janičenoks 4		Pts: Valančiūnas 15; Rebs: Mačiulis 10; Asts: Kalnietis 6

Arena Riga, Riga
Attendance: 10,492
Referees: Ilija Belošević (SRB), Petar Obradović (BIH), Saverio Lanzarini (ITA)

=== Ukraine v Czech Republic ===
6 September 2015
21:30

Boxscore

Ukraine	64–78	Czech Republic
Scoring by quarter: 14–20, 16–26, 15–19, 19–13
Pts: Fesenko 14; Rebs: Fesenko 8 Asts: Lukashov 4		Pts: Veselý 19; Rebs: Veselý 9 Asts: Satoranský 6

Arena Riga, Riga
Attendance: 614
Referees: Emilio Pérez Pizarro (ESP), Emin Moğulkoç (TUR), Amit Balak (ISR)

== 7 September ==
=== Lithuania v Belgium ===
7 September 2015
15:30

Boxscore

Lithuania	74–76	Belgium
Scoring by quarter: 20–12, 15–23, 19–22, 20–19
Pts: Valančiūnas 25; Rebs: Valančiūnas 12; Asts: Kalnietis 13		Pts: Lojeski 20; Rebs: Gillet 4 Asts: Lojeski, Van Rossom 5

Arena Riga, Riga
Attendance: 3,570
Referees: Emilio Pérez Pizarro (ESP), Petar Obradović (BIH), Sigmundur Herbertsson (ISL)

=== Czech Republic v Latvia ===
7 September 2015
18:30

Boxscore

Czech Republic	65–72	Latvia
Scoring by quarter: 22–17, 11–23, 9–11, 23–21
Pts: Satoranský 22; Rebs: Veselý 11; Asts: Satoranský 9		Pts: Blūms 14; Rebs: Freimanis, Timma 8 Asts: Strēlnieks 7

Arena Riga, Riga
Attendance: 5,710
Referees: Milivoje Jovčić (SRB), Emin Moğulkoç (TUR), Marcin Kowalski (POL)

=== Ukraine v Estonia ===
7 September 2015
21:30

Boxscore

Ukraine	71–78	Estonia
Scoring by quarter: 15–14, 23–14, 6–22, 27–28
Pts: Randle 22; Rebs: Pustozvonov 7 Asts: Randle 4		Pts: Arbet 26; Rebs: Vene 8 Asts: S. Sokk, Veideman 6

Arena Riga, Riga
Attendance: 2,795
Referees: Ilija Belošević (SRB), Eddie Viator (FRA), Amit Balak (ISR)

== 9 September ==
=== Belgium v Czech Republic ===
9 September 2015
15:30

Boxscore

Belgium	64–66	Czech Republic
Scoring by quarter: 17–21, 11–12, 16–18, 20–15
Pts: Tabu 12; Rebs: Hervelle 9 Asts: Van Rossom 7		Pts: Veselý 21; Rebs: Veselý 12; Asts: Satoranský 9

Arena Riga, Riga
Attendance: 477
Referees: Ilija Belošević (SRB), Saverio Lanzarini (ITA), Petar Obradović (BIH)

=== Latvia v Ukraine ===
9 September 2015
18:30

Boxscore

Latvia	74–75	Ukraine
Scoring by quarter: 21–14, 18–24, 23–22, 12–15
Pts: Bertāns 17; Rebs: Bērziņš 6 Asts: Bertāns, Strēlnieks 5		Pts: Fesenko 21; Rebs: Fesenko 10; Asts: Randle 5

Arena Riga, Riga
Attendance: 5,998
Referees: Emilio Pérez Pizarro (ESP), Milivoje Jovčić (SRB), Sigmundur Herbertsson (ISL)

=== Estonia v Lithuania ===
9 September 2015
21:30

Boxscore

Estonia	62–64	Lithuania
Scoring by quarter: 15–20, 16–18, 20–11, 11–15
Pts: Talts 20; Rebs: Vene 7 Asts: S. Sokk 5		Pts: Mačiulis 15; Rebs: Mačiulis 10; Asts: Kalnietis 7

Arena Riga, Riga
Attendance: 6,985
Referees: Emin Moğulkoç (TUR), Marcin Kowalski (POL), Amit Balak (ISR)

== 10 September ==
=== Ukraine v Belgium ===
10 September 2015
15:30

Boxscore

Ukraine	71–79	Belgium
Scoring by quarter: 19–14, 20–21, 15–24, 17–20
Pts: Fesenko 20; Rebs: Fesenko 11; Asts: Randle 4		Pts: Gillet 15; Rebs: Tabu 8 Asts: Van Rossom 6

Arena Riga, Riga
Attendance: 387
Referees: Milivoje Jovčić (SRB), Marcin Kowalski (POL), Sigmundur Herbertsson (ISL)

=== Latvia v Estonia ===
10 September 2015
18:30

Boxscore

Latvia	75–64	Estonia
Scoring by quarter: 15–29, 18–15, 22–5, 20–15
Pts: Strēlnieks 21; Rebs: Timma 6 Asts: Bertāns, Strēlnieks 3		Pts: Arbet 16; Rebs: Kangur 8 Asts: Veideman 8

Arena Riga, Riga
Attendance: 9,073
Referees: Ilija Belošević (SRB), Eddie Viator (FRA), Saverio Lanzarini (ITA)

=== Czech Republic v Lithuania ===
10 September 2015
21:30

Boxscore

Czech Republic	81–85 (OT)	Lithuania
Scoring by quarter: 18–12, 19–15, 14–28, 18–14, Overtime: 12–16
Pts: Schilb 18; Rebs: Satoranský 9 Asts: Satoranský 15		Pts: Kuzminskas 18; Rebs: Valančiūnas 10; Asts: Kalnietis 4

Arena Riga, Riga
Attendance: 4,669
Referees: Emilio Pérez Pizarro (ESP), Emin Moğulkoç (TUR), Petar Obradović (BIH)
