= 2026–27 Latvian–Estonian Basketball League =

Latvian–Estonian Basketball League^{1}
- Season: 2026–27
- Duration: 22 September 2026 – April 2027
- Teams: 15
- TV partners: Delfi TV, Inspira, TV4, Best4Sport TV

The 2025–26 Latvian–Estonian Basketball League, is the ninth season of the Latvian–Estonian Basketball League, the premier basketball competition for men's teams in Estonia and Latvia.

== Teams ==
The number of teams increased from 14 to 15, due to Rigas Ekselences Juniori entering the league.

Location of teams in 2026–27 Latvian–Estonian Basketball League

Team	Home city	Arena	Capacity
(Estonia) BC Pärnu	Pärnu	Pärnu Sports Hall	1,820
(Estonia) Bigbank/Kalev	Tallinn	Nord Sports Hall	1,066
(Latvia) BK Liepāja	Liepāja	Liepāja Olympic Center	2,542
(Latvia) BK Ogre	Ogre	Arēna Ogre	1,700
(Latvia) BK Ventspils	Ventspils	Ventspils Olympic Center	3,085
(Estonia) Keila Basket	Keila	Keila Health Center	800
(Estonia) Keila KK	Keila	Keila Health Center	800
(Latvia) Latvijas Universitāte	Riga	O. Kalpaka RTDP	258
(Latvia) Rigas Ekselences Juniori	Riga	Latvian Team Sports Hall	2,900
(Latvia) Rīgas Zeļļi	Riga	Latvian Team Sports Hall	2,900
(Estonia) TalTech/ALEXELA	Tallinn	TalTech Sports Hall	1,000
(Estonia) Tartu Ülikool Maks & Moorits	Tartu	University of Tartu Sports Hall	2,600
(Latvia) Valmiera Glass VIA	Valmiera	Valmiera Olympic Center	1,500
(Latvia) VEF Rīga	Riga	Rimi Olympic Sports Center	830
(Estonia) Viimsi	Haabneeme	Forus Sports Center	500

=== Coaching changes ===
Pre-season
Team	Outgoing coach	Incoming coach
(Estonia) Bigbank/Kalev	(Finland) Anton Mirolybov	(Estonia) Brett Nõmm
(Latvia) BK Liepāja	(Latvia) Artūrs Visockis-Rubenis	(Latvia) Gundars Vētra
(Latvia) BK Ogre	(Latvia) Uldis Švēde	(Latvia) Artūrs Visockis-Rubenis
(Estonia) Keila KK	(Estonia) Andres Sõber	(Italy) Alessio Landra
(Latvia) Rīgas Zeļļi	(Latvia) Dāvis Čoders	(Lithuania) Rokas Kondratavicius
(Latvia) Valmiera Glass VIA	(Latvia) Kaspars Vecvagars	(Latvia) Dāvis Čoders
(Latvia) VEF Rīga	(Latvia) Mārtiņš Gulbis	(Latvia) Jevgēnijs Kosuškins

== Regular season ==
=== League table ===
Pos	Team	Pld	W	L	PF	PA	PD	PCT	Qualification
1	(Latvia) Rīgas Zeļļi	10	10	0	910	731	+179	1.000	Qualification to play-offs
2	(Latvia) VEF Rīga	11	8	3	973	848	+125	.727	Qualification to play-offs
3	(Latvia) Valmiera Glass VIA	11	8	3	962	831	+131	.727	Qualification to play-offs
4	(Estonia) TalTech/ALEXELA	13	9	4	1006	929	+77	.692	Qualification to play-offs
5	(Estonia) Tartu Ülikool Maks & Moorits	10	6	4	814	767	+47	.600	Qualification to play-offs
6	(Estonia) Bigbank/Kalev	10	6	4	854	808	+46	.600	Qualification to play-offs
7	(Estonia) BC Pärnu	9	5	4	704	690	+14	.556	Qualification to play-offs
8	(Latvia) BK Ventspils	11	6	5	948	926	+22	.545	Qualification to play-offs
9	(Estonia) Keila KK	11	6	5	821	892	−71	.545	
10	(Latvia) BK Ogre	11	6	5	946	934	+12	.545	
11	(Latvia) BK Liepāja	11	5	6	911	858	+53	.455	
12	(Latvia) Rigas Ekselences Juniori	10	3	7	760	865	−105	.300	
13	(Estonia) Viimsi	12	2	10	902	1042	−140	.167	
14	(Latvia) Latvijas Universitāte	11	1	10	844	994	−150	.091	
15	(Estonia) Keila Basket	11	0	11	762	1002	−240	.000	

Updated to match(es) played on 22 November 2026. Source: EstLatBL.com

=== Results ===
Home \ Away	PAR	KLV	BKL	BKO	BKV	KEB	KEI	LAT	REJ	ZEL	TAL	TAR	VAL	VEF	VMS
BC Pärnu	—	27 Dec	76–73	13 Dec	89–80	7 Feb	70–75	91–77	18 Dec	10 Feb	16 Jan	67–70	76–74	13 Mar	30 Dec
Bigbank/Kalev	79–78	—	5 Dec	2 Feb	73–86	98–77	30 Jan	89–76	100–79	87–93	8 Mar	9 Jan	12 Dec	30 Dec	23 Jan
BK Liepāja	20 Jan	3 Mar	—	22 Dec	16 Dec	92–65	13 Mar	2 Dec	98–88	3 Feb	71–78	83–87	6 Feb	13 Feb	112–54
BK Ogre	10 Mar	92–88	17 Feb	—	88–92	101–77	81–89	106–81	27 Jan	18 Dec	9 Dec	6 Feb	4 Dec	73–92	19 Jan
BK Ventspils	2 Feb	5 Mar	26 Jan	16 Mar	—	20 Jan	12 Mar	5 Jan	8 Dec	17 Feb	82–85	92–85	19 Dec	85–96	75–60
Keila Basket	73–85	17 Jan	9 Mat	12 Feb	68–85	—	6 Jan	77–85	1 Feb	71–94	56–97	24 Jan	27 Dec	13 Dec	20 Dec
Keila KK	9 Jan	2 Dec	6 Dec	6 Mar	6 Feb		—	78–76	23 Jan	9 Feb	58–79	71–89	82–106	19 Dec	78–72
Latvijas Universitāte	25 Jan	5 Feb	9 Feb	12 Jan	92–108	7 Dec	3 Mar	—	15 Dec	19 Jan	22 Dec	15 Mar	9 Mar	16 Feb	86–88
Rigas Ekselences Juniori	16 Mar	14 Mar	69–99	72–77	13 Jan	89–82	66–79	94–87	—	14 Feb	48–80	27 Dec	73–82	17 Jan	82–81
Rīgas Zeļļi	2 Dec	13 Mar	85–69	110–85	12 Dec	5 Mar	103–70	6 Mar	6 Feb	—	92–66	26 Dec	67–64	6 Dec	93–72
TalTech/ALEXELA	6 Dec	19 Dec	12 Dec	82–78	92–87	29 Jan	30 Dec	78–59	10 Feb	73–79	—	12 Mar	6 Mar	70–90	3 Feb
Tartu Ülikool Maks & Moorits	30 Jan	90–63	19 Dec	82–89	12 Feb	2 Dec	16 Jan	12 Dec	7 Mar	74–94	65–41	—	86–93	6 Mar	3 Mar
Valmiera Glass VIA	3 Mar	12 Feb	89–72	12 Mar	98–76	95–56	26 Jan	81–59	16 Feb	2 Jan	6 Jan	20 Jan	—	89–97	13 Jan
VEF Rīga	89–72	71–88	82–55	5 Jan	2 Dec	12 Jan	90–60	104–66	3 Mar	10 Mar	6 Feb	74–86	16 Mar	—	10 Feb
Viimsi	7 Mar	66–89	85–87	69–76	7 Feb	14 Mar	13 Dec	31 Jan	10 Jan	27 Jan	64–85	6 Dec	87–91	104–88	—

Updated to match(es) played on 22 November 2026. Source: EstLatBL.com
Legend: Blue = home team win; Red = away team win.
Matches with lighter background shading were decided after overtime.

== Attendances to arenas ==
=== Average attendances ===
Pos	Team	Total	High	Low	Average
1	Tartu Ülikool Maks & Moorits	4,555	1,915	975	1,518
2	BK Ventspils	3,816	1,476	684	954
3	Valmiera Glass VIA	4,362	1,449	437	872
4	TalTech/ALEXELA	3,599	794	642	719
5	BC Pärnu	3,974	920	512	662
6	BK Ogre	3,703	1,008	324	617
7	VEF Rīga	3,130	869	248	521
8	Rīgas Zeļļi	2,568	823	351	513
9	Bigbank/Kalev	3,030	659	372	505
10	BK Liepāja	2,242	660	150	448
11	Keila KK	2,526	627	304	421
12	Viimsi	2,193	814	247	365
13	Keila Basket	833	209	128	166
14	Latvijas Universitāte	328	203	125	164
15	Rigas Ekselences Juniori	1,050	185	82	131
	League total	39,274	1,915	82	565

Source: EstLatBL.com

== Awards ==
=== MVP of the Month ===
Month	Player	Team	Ref.
October	(Estonia) Mihkel Kirves	(Estonia) BC Pärnu	

== Clubs in European competitions ==
Team	Competition	Progress
(Latvia) Rīgas Zeļļi	EuroCup	Regular season
(Latvia) VEF Rīga	Champions League	Qualifying
(Latvia) VEF Rīga	FIBA Europe Cup	Regular season
(Estonia) Bigbank/Kalev	FIBA Europe Cup	Regular season
(Estonia) Tartu Ülikool Maks & Moorits	FIBA Europe Cup	Regular season
(Latvia) Valmiera Glass VIA	FIBA Europe Cup	Regular season
(Estonia) BC Pärnu	FIBA Europe Cup	Regular season

Regional competitions
Team	Competition	Progress
(Estonia) TalTech/ALEXELA	European North Basketball League	Regular season
(Latvia) BK Liepāja	European North Basketball League	Regular season
