= Jevgēnijs Kosuškins =

Latvian basketball coach (born 1977)

VEF Riga
- Title: Head coach

Personal information
- Born: January 25, 1977 (age 49) Rīga, Latvia
- Listed height: 2.02 m (6 ft 8 in)
- Listed weight: 108 kg (238 lb)
- Position: Power forward
- Coaching career: 2012–present

Career history

Playing
- 1996-1999: VEF/LSPA
- 1999–2004: BK Ventspils
- 2004–2005: BK Valmiera
- 2005–2009: BK Barons
- 2009–2011: BK Liepāja
- 2011–2012: BK Jūrmala

Coaching
- 2012–2013: BK Jūrmala
- 2013–2026: VEF Rīga (assistant)
- 2026-present: VEF Rīga

Career highlights
- As player: 5× Latvian League champion (2000–2004); As assistant coach: 9x Latvian League champion (2015, 2017, 2019–2025); 4x Latvian Cup champion (2022–2025); 2x Latvian-Estonian Basketball League champion (2022, 2025)
Medals
Men's basketball
Representing Latvia
FIBA Europe Under-20 Championship
Silver medal – second place	2013 Estonia	National Team

Jevgēnijs Kosuškins (born 25 January 1977 in Rīga) is a Latvian professional basketball coach who is currently the head coach for VEF Rīga of the Latvian-Estonian Basketball League and FIBA Europe Cup.

== Playing career ==
During his youth, Kosuškins trained at the VEF Sports School. In 1997, Kosuškins represented the VEF/LSPA team and was a candidate for the Latvian national team. In 1999, Kosuškins joined BK Ventspils, coached by the legendary Armands Krauliņš, in the same season in which the team won its first Latvian Basketball League championship. He subsequently won four more Latvian championship titles with Ventspils.

After his time with Ventspils, Kosuškins also played for BK Valmiera, Barons/LMT Riga, Liepājas Lauvas, where he served as team captain for both Barons and Liepājas Lauvas, and Jūrmala/Fēnikss. In April 2012, he ended his professional basketball career.

== Coaching career ==
After retiring from professional basketball, Kosuškins immediately began his coaching career, taking charge of his last team as a player, Jūrmala/Fēnikss. He served several times as an assistant coach for Latvia's youth national teams. As an assistant to head coach Artūrs Štālbergs with the Latvia under-20 national team, he won the silver medal at the 2013 FIBA Europe Under-20 Championship.

Immediately afterwards, he joined the coaching staff of VEF Rīga, serving as an assistant coach under head coach Ramūnas Butautas, a role he continued to hold for many years. He worked as an assistant to head coaches Nikolajs Mazurs, Carlos Frade, Jānis Gailītis and Mārtiņš Gulbis. With VEF, he won several more Latvian championship titles as an assistant coach. With a total of 14 titles, he became the most decorated winner in the history of the Latvian Basketball League.

Following an unsuccessful 2025–26 season, in which VEF failed to win an LBL medal for the first time in 17 years, as well as missing out on the Latvian Basketball Cup and the Latvian–Estonian Basketball League title, the club ended its working relationship with Mārtiņš Gulbis. Kosuškins, who had served as an assistant coach for many years, was appointed head coach.

From 2017 to 2019, Kosuškins served as an assistant coach to head coach Arnis Vecvagars with the Latvia national basketball team, alongside Artūrs Visockis-Rubenis.
