= BK VEF Rīga =

Latvian basketball team

VEF Rīga
- Nickname: Vefiņš
- Leagues: Latvian–Estonian Basketball League; Latvian Basketball League; Europe Cup
- Founded: 1958 (refounded 2007)
- History: VEF Rīga (1958–1992) (2007–present)
- Arena: Latvian Team Sports Hall; Olympic Sports Centre
- Capacity: 2,900; 830
- Location: Riga, Latvia
- Team colors: Black and White
- President: Gatis Jahovičs
- Head coach: Jevgēnijs Kosuškins
- Championships: 12 Latvian Championships; 4 Latvian Cups; 2 LatEst Championship; 1 Stepas Butautas Cup
- Website: vefriga.com
Home	Away

VEF Rīga is a Latvian professional basketball team that is based in Riga, Latvia. VEF Rīga is an twelve-time Latvian Basketball League champion.

== History ==
=== Early years ===
The club name VEF came from the radio manufacturing company VEF which created the basketball club in 1958. VEF Rīga has been home to some of the best Latvian players for over five decades. In the beginning with legendary Alfrēds Krauklis as head coach and players like Cezars Ozers, Oļģerts Jurgensons, Bruno Drake, Juris Kalnins, Edmunds Dobelis, Juris Merksons, Visvaldis Eglitis and others, VEF soon started to compete in the Soviet Union League. Back in those days, Latvia was a reference in Soviet and European basketball, as ASK Rīga was the best team in the continent, winning three consecutive European Cup titles from 1958 and 1960 with stars like Jānis Krūmiņš, Maigonis Valdmanis and head coach Aleksander Gomelskiy. ASK's tremendous success overshadowed VEF's achievements, such as finishing third in the very competitive USSR championship in 1960. VEF's star player Cezars Ozers made it to the Soviet Union national team that reached the Olympics title game against the United States in Rome 1960.

VEF Rīga confirmed its status as a Soviet Union League regular, keeping its name in the first division and becoming a hard-to-beat team at any level. However, the lack of a second continental club competition prevented VEF from proving its value against European teams. VEF had its first golden age throughout the 1960s, with Merksons, Kalnins, Jurgensons Ozers, Eglitis and Drake as its core players. A major addition had taken place, too, as Krumins, the most dominant player in Europe for many years, decided to finish his legendary career at VEF, joining the club in 1964. Olgerts Altbergs replaced Krauklis as head coach and had a sudden impact, helping VEF to finish fourth in 1965. Kalnins won a silver Olympic medal with the Soviet Union in 1964, becoming the second VEF player to do so. The team did even better in 1966, finishing third in its domestic competition for the second time in club history. In 1969 team went down to the second division of Soviet league and it took some time to rebuild as the team got back into the Soviet Union elite in 1977 led by legendary player Valdis Valters.

Valters was a valuable, the starting point guard in the Soviet Union national team that won the 1982 World Championships and lifted the EuroBasket trophy in 1981 (Valters was named tournament MVP) as well as in 1985. Valters was also part of a team that reached Eurobasket title games in 1983 and 1987. Valters left the national team when Sarunas Marciulionis took over, but still played for the VEF until 1990.

In later years, Valters got some help as VEF added young talents like Igors Miglinieks, Gundars Vētra, Raimonds Miglinieks, Kārlis Muižnieks and Ainars Bagatskis. With arguably its best roster ever VEF was fifth in the Soviet Union League in 1985 and ranked sixth in 1987 and 1988. Vētra and Miglinieks led VEF to finish third in the 1991 Soviet Union League, a historical season in which the club made its debut in European club competitions. VEF downed ICED Bucuresti but fell against Iraklis in the 1991 Korac Cup second preliminary round. VEF went one step higher in 1992, playing in the Saporta Cup. The club knocked off Braunschweig but VEF registered two narrow losses against Union Olimpija in the next round to step down before the group stage. Despite its good season, VEF ceased to exist in 1992.

=== Re-foundation ===
The club was re-founded in 2007 with Valdis Valters as the head coach. VEF Riga started by competing in the Latvian League and the Baltic League second division. VEF Riga was made up of young and talented players, so the team improved gradually. It all paid off right away, as VEF Riga made it to the Baltic League second division title game in 2008 and 2009, earning the right to join the first division in 2009-10.

In the same season, VEF returned to European competitions as it played in FIBA Euro Challenge. Also, VEF Rīga took part in VTB United League's inaugural regular season. In 2010, led by Alex Renfroe and Sandis Valters, VEF Riga reached the Latvian League finals for the first time, losing 3-4 to Barons Riga. In the 2010 off-season, VEF Riga made another step forward as they got a chance to play in Eurocup. VEF Riga named Rimas Kurtinaitis as the head coach and made some key roster moves like re-signing Sandis Valters along with acquisitions of other top Latvian players such as Kristaps Janičenoks, Kaspars Bērziņš and Dairis Bertāns.

During the season, Kurtinaitis left Riga for Russian powerhouse BC Khimki and he was replaced by another Lithuanian Ramūnas Butautas, who already had experience in Latvia, having won the 2007 Latvian league championship with ASK Rīga. VEF Riga finished the season as the winners of BBL regular season. Later in BBL play-off stage VEF Riga caused a surprise by eliminating the Lithuanian club Lietuvos Rytas at the BBL semi-finals, beating them 79:68. It was the first time that one of the BBL finalists wasn't Lietuvos Rytas. However, VEF Rīga lost in the final to Lithuanian basketball club Žalgiris, with a final score of 69:75. In the Latvian League, VEF Rīga returned to the finals, where they faced BK Ventspils. During the intense series, VEF Rīga managed to beat Ventspils, 4-3, winning first Latvian championship.

=== Rise under Butautas ===
Before the 2011-2012 season, VEF Rīga participated in the Euroleague qualification round for the first time, where they lost to ALBA Berlin. It meant VEF Rīga had to play in Eurocup, where they reached the Last 16 round for the first time. In Baltic League, they finished in third place, while in the Latvian league VEF Rīga repeated as champions defeating Ventspils, in the finals, 4-1.

During the following off-season, VEF Rīga got lucky by getting E.J. Rowland, who was loaned from Unicaja Málaga with favorable conditions. Rowland turned out to be a massive part of upcoming success. Rowland, surrounded by a strong core consisting of Latvian players, helped VEF Rīga get wins over well-established teams. The culmination of the season was on 15 January 2013 when VEF Rīga trashed Bilbao Basket at Arēna Rīga, 99-76. In the VTB United League, VEF Rīga stopped after Quarterfinals, but in Latvian League, they won the third consecutive title against Ventspils (4-1).

After a very good season, VEF Rīga lost its top players as Bilbao bought out Dairis Bertāns, and E.J. Rowland signed a lucrative contract in Turkey, followed by other departures. The season wasn't as good as the previous one. One of the reasons was the inconsistent lineup. One of the biggest signings of the summer, Gani Lawal, left the team in the preseason. VEF Rīga had a first-round exit in the Euroleague qualification round which was followed by not making the second round in the Eurocup. In the end, affected by injuries and some unexpected events like Derrick Nix leaving the team on the eve of the Latvian League finals, after three years of dominance VEF Rīga lost the domestic championship, losing to Ventspils, 1-4.

In the 2014 off-season, VEF Riga went through rebuilding as several new faces (Jānis Timma, Mareks Mejeris) joined the team. VEF struggled in international tournaments and failed to make the playoffs, but finished the season by the winning Latvian championship. After the departure of Nikolajs Mazurs, VEF hired Carlos Frade as the next head coach. The Spanish coach tried to change the philosophy of the basketball VEF played under previous coaches, but it didn't turn out well, and on 12 December 2015, VEF fired Frade. Long-time assistant Jānis Gailītis was promoted as a head coach and took the team to the Latvian League finals, but lost to Valmiera/Ordo.

Gailītis continued as head coach. The following season VEF signed Latvian National Team captain Jānis Blūms and another veteran Armands Šķēle. They helped to regain the Latvian championship, and VEF returned to the VTB League quarterfinals for the first time in four years.

Following the 2016-17 season, Blums and Skele veterans left the team, but VEF signed another two experienced players: Kristaps Janičenoks and Kaspars Bērziņš. Alex Pérez was also signed, giving him his first experience in European basketball. The team again qualified for the VTB League quarterfinals but failed to win the Latvian championship.

=== Leaving VTB League and joining Champions League ===
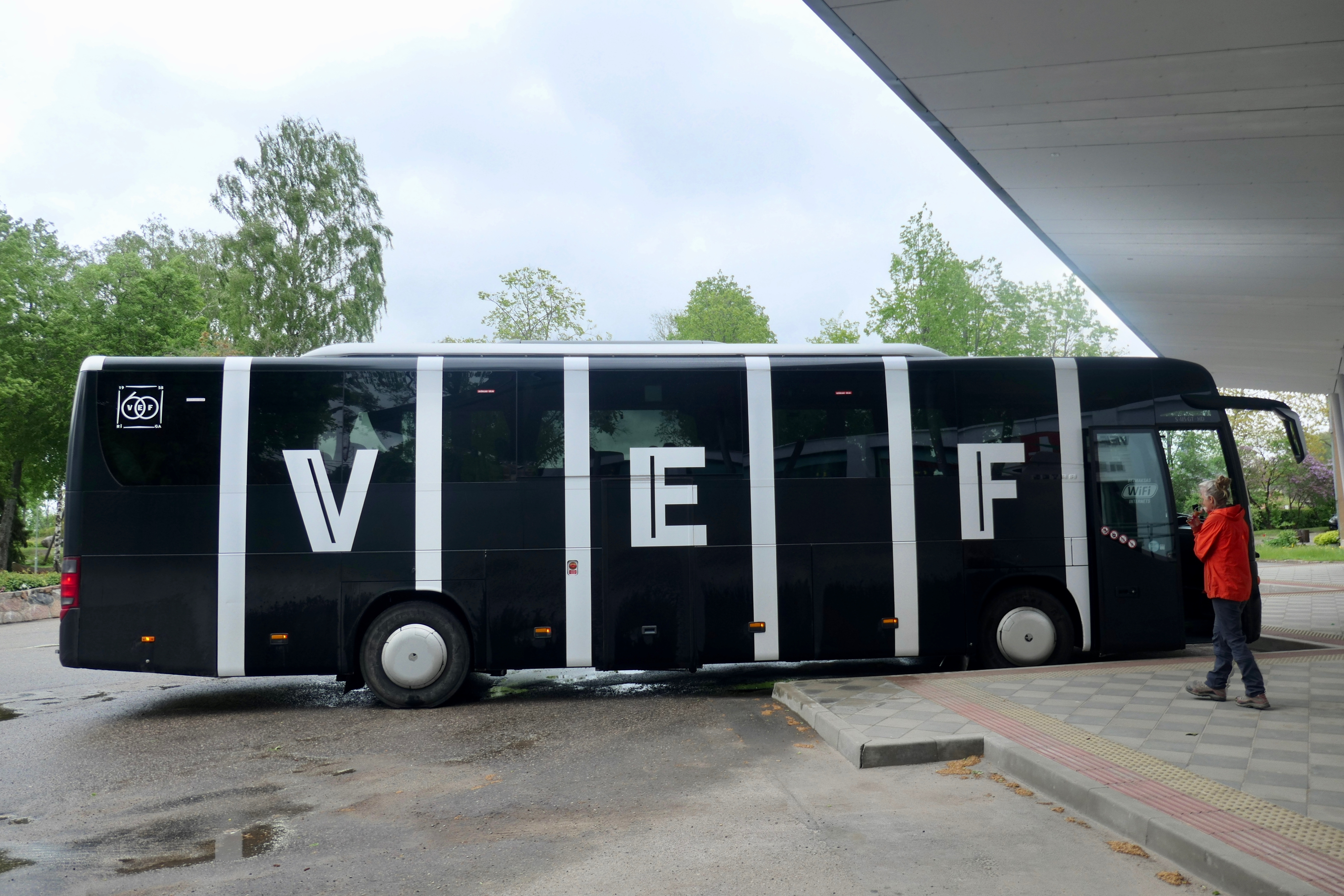
VEF bus in Latvia.

In 2018-19 season VEF joined newly created Latvian-Estonian Basketball League. They lost in the final to biggest rivals Ventspils, but revenged in Latvian League finals, winning Latvian championship for the 6th time. It was Janičenoks' last season in his professional career. Mareks Mejeris had become a star player of the team, and VEF wasn't able to keep him in the 2019 off-season. Mejeris signed with Parma Basket. Team's budget became smaller and the management decided to leave VTB United League. Instead, VEF returned to international competition stage, joining Basketball Champions League, organized by FIBA.

In 2019 off-season VEF signed back veteran Jānis Blūms and promising Latvian talent Artūrs Kurucs, loaned by Spanish Euroleague team Saski Baskonia. Kurucs used the opportunity, becoming one of the best young players in Basketball Champions League. Debut in Champions League was rough, VEF won only one of 14 games in regular season and was dead last in the standings. End of the season was interrupted by COVID-19 pandemic. VEF was awarded Latvian championship, so they could get back to Champions League the following season.

Second participation in the Basketball Champions League was way better, as VEF qualified for the playoffs round, and also won the Latvian championship. However, team again failed to win the 2020–21 Latvian–Estonian Basketball League, losing to Estonian Kalev/Cramo in the final. Many players used the platform to rise their name and got better contracts for the next season: Kyle Allman signed with Paris Basketball, Michale Kyser signed with Hapoel Holon, Isaiah Piñeiro signed with Darüşşafaka. Kristers Zoriks became a Latvian NT starter.

On 7 March 2022 VEF won the Latvian Cup for the first time ever. It was first Latvian Cup organized since 1994. Alexander Madsen was named the Latvian Cup MVP.

== Honours ==
=== League ===
- Latvian League:

Winners (12): 2011, 2012, 2013, 2015, 2017, 2019, 2020, 2021, 2022, 2023, 2024, 2025

Runners-up (4): 2010, 2014, 2016, 2018

- Latvian Cup:

Winners (4): 2022, 2023, 2024, 2025

- Baltic League

Runners-up (1): 2011

Bronze medal (1): 2012

- BBL Cup

Winners (1): 2011

- Latvian–Estonian League

Winners (2): 2022, 2025

Runners-up (2): 2019, 2021

Bronze medal (2): 2024, 2026

- USSR Championship

Bronze medal (3): 1960, 1966, 1991

== Season by season record ==
Season	League	Regional	Europe	VTB	Latvian Cup	Head coach
2007–08	Latvian League; Semi-finals	Challenge Cup; Runners-up	did not participate	No tournament	No tournament	Valdis Valters
2008–09	Latvian League; Semi-finals	Challenge Cup; Runners-up	did not participate	did not participate	No tournament	Valdis Valters
2009–10	Latvian League; Runner-up	Elite Division; 6th Place	EuroChallenge; Group Stage	VTB League; Regular season	No tournament	Valdis Valters/Nikolajs Mazurs
2010–11	Latvian League; Champions	Elite Division; Runner-up	Eurocup; Group Stage	VTB League; Regular season	No tournament	Rimas Kurtinaitis/Ramunas Butautas
2011–12	Latvian League; Champions	Elite Division; 3rd place	Eurocup; Last 16	VTB League; Regular season	No tournament	Ramūnas Butautas
2012–13	Latvian League; Champions	did not participate	Eurocup; Last 16	VTB League; Quarterfinals	No tournament	Ramūnas Butautas
2013–14	Latvian League; Runner-up	did not participate	Eurocup; Regular season	VTB League; Group stage	No tournament	Ramūnas Butautas
2014–15	Latvian League; Champions	did not participate	Eurocup; Regular season	VTB League; Regular season	No tournament	Nikolajs Mazurs
2015–16	Latvian League; Runner-up	did not participate	did not participate	VTB League; Regular season	No tournament	Carlos Frade/Jānis Gailītis
2016–17	Latvian League; Champions	did not participate	did not participate	VTB League; Quarterfinals	No tournament	Jānis Gailītis
2017–18	Latvian League; Runner-up	did not participate	did not participate	VTB League; Quarterfinals	No tournament	Jānis Gailītis
2018–19	Latvian League; Champions	Latvian–Estonian League; Runner-up	did not participate	VTB League; Regular season	No tournament	Jānis Gailītis
2019-20	Latvian League; Champions	Latvian–Estonian League; Abd-1st	Champions League; Regular season	did not participate	No tournament	Jānis Gailītis
2020-21	Latvian League; Champions	Latvian–Estonian League; Runner-up	Champions League; Playoffs	did not participate	Cancelled	Jānis Gailītis
2021-22	Latvian League; Champions	Latvian–Estonian League; Champions	Champions League; Play-in	did not participate	Latvian Cup; Winners	Jānis Gailītis
2022-23	Latvian League; Champions	Latvian–Estonian League; Runner-up	Champions League; Regular season	did not participate	Latvian Cup; Winners	Jānis Gailītis
2023-24	Latvian League; Champions	Latvian–Estonian League; Bronze	Champions League; Regular season	did not participate	Latvian Cup; Winners	Jānis Gailītis
2024-25	Latvian League; Champions	Latvian–Estonian League; Champions	Champions League; Regular season	did not participate	Latvian Cup; Winners	Mārtiņš Gulbis
2025-26	Latvian League; 4th place	Latvian–Estonian League; Bronze	Champions League; Regular season	did not participate	Latvian Cup; Quarter-finals	Mārtiņš Gulbis

== Players ==
=== Current roster ===
Note: Flags indicate national team eligibility at FIBA-sanctioned events. Players may hold other non-FIBA nationalities not displayed.

BK VEF Rīga roster
Players
Coaches

Pos.	No.	Nat.	Name	Ht.	Wt.	Age
G/F	1	(Latvia)	Būmeisters, Rodrigo	1.96 m (6 ft 5 in)	85 kg (187 lb)	26 – 14 September 2000
PG	3	(United States)	Sears, Jordan	1.80 m (5 ft 11 in)	84 kg (185 lb)	25 – 5 September 2001
F	4	(Latvia)	Siliņš, Ojārs	2.04 m (6 ft 8 in)	98 kg (216 lb)	33 – 20 July 1993
PF	5	(Latvia)	Mejeris, Mareks	2.07 m (6 ft 9 in)	95 kg (209 lb)	35 – 2 September 1991
PF	7	(Latvia)	Aleksandrovs, Rihards	2.01 m (6 ft 7 in)	106 kg (234 lb)	24 – 5 April 2002
C	9	(United States)	Rogers, Matt	2.06 m (6 ft 9 in)	100 kg (220 lb)	24 – 12 April 2002
SG	15	(Panama)	Rodriguez, Luis	1.98 m (6 ft 6 in)	100 kg (220 lb)	27 – 15 March 1999
C	20	(Latvia)	Ozols, Artūrs	2.05 m (6 ft 9 in)	95 kg (209 lb)	20 – 19 April 2006
SG	21	(Latvia)	Šķēle, Aigars	1.92 m (6 ft 4 in)	84 kg (185 lb)	33 – 4 December 1992
PG	30	(Ukraine)	Sanon, Issuf	1.93 m (6 ft 4 in)	83 kg (183 lb)	27 – 30 October 1999
PG	32	(Latvia)	Niedra, Jēkabs	1.84 m (6 ft 0 in)	78 kg (172 lb)	19 – 8 December 2006
SG	33	(Latvia)	Berkolds, Rihards	1.94 m (6 ft 4 in)	85 kg (187 lb)	22 – 7 February 2004
PG	44	(Latvia)	Aleksandrovs, Ralfs	1.89 m (6 ft 2 in)	75 kg (165 lb)	18 – 18 April 2008
SG	55	(United States)	Asberry, Caleb	1.90 m (6 ft 3 in)	78 kg (172 lb)	26 – 29 January 2000

Head coach

- (Latvia) Jevgēnijs Kosuškins

Assistant coach(es)

- (Latvia) Mārtiņš Zībarts
- (Latvia) Gunārs Gailītis

Strength & conditioning coach(es)

- (Latvia) Alberts Putāns
- (Latvia) Oskars Ernšteins

Physiotherapist(s)

- (Latvia) Harijs Hanzens
- (Latvia) Gustavs Kleins

Legend

- (C) Team captain
- Injured

- Roster
Updated: October 4, 2026

=== Depth chart ===
Pos.	Starting 5	Bench 1	Bench 2
C	Mareks Mejeris	Matt Rogers	Artūrs Ozols
PF	Ojārs Siliņš	Rihards Aleksandrovs
SF	Luis Rodriguez	Rodrigo Būmeisters	Rihards Berkolds
SG	Aigars Šķēle	Issuf Sanon	Jēkabs Niedra
PG	Jordan Sears	Caleb Asberry	Ralfs Aleksandrovs

=== Squad changes for the 2026–27 season ===
==== In ====
Note: Flags indicate national team, as has been defined under FIBA eligibility rules. Players may hold more than one non-FIBA nationality.

No.	Pos.	Nat.	Player
	SG	(Latvia) LAT	Aigars Šķēle (from (Poland) Czarni Słupsk)
	PF	(Latvia) LAT	Mareks Mejeris (from (Poland) Stal Ostrów Wielkopolski)
	SG	(Panama) PAN	Luis Rodriguez (from (Brazil) Franca)
	PF	(Latvia) LAT	Ojārs Siliņš (from (Poland) Legia Warsaw)
	PG	(United States) USA	Jordan Sears (from (Germany) (2) BG Göttingen)
	C	(Latvia) LAT	Artūrs Ozols (from (Latvia) (2) RSU/VEF Rīga)
	PG	(Latvia) LAT	Ralfs Aleksandrovs (from (Latvia) (2) Gulbenes Buki/BJSS)
	PG	(United States) USA	Caleb Asberry (from (New Zealand) Southland Sharks)
	SG	(Ukraine) UKR	Issuf Sanon (from (Poland) Śląsk Wrocław)
	C	(United States) USA	Amari Kelly (from (Turkey) (2) Best Balıkesir)
	C	(United States) USA	Matt Rogers* (from (NCAA) American University Eagles)

==== Out ====
Note: Flags indicate national team, as has been defined under FIBA eligibility rules. Players may hold more than one non-FIBA nationality.

No.	Pos.	Nat.	Player
9	SG	(Latvia) LAT	Dairis Bertāns (career end)
13	PF	(Latvia) LAT	Māris Gulbis (career end)
35	SF	(Latvia) LAT	Kristaps Ķilps (to (Poland) Twarde Pierniki Toruń)
55	PG	(Ukraine) UKR	Illya Sydorov (to (Estonia) BC Pärnu)
4	PG	(Latvia) LAT	Tomass Latiševs (to (United States) Mount Carmel Christian School)
11	PF	(Latvia) LAT	Ričards Vanags (to (Slovenia) KK Šenčur)
0	SF	(United States) USA	Curtis Hollis (to (Russia) BC Avtodor)
20	PF	(Switzerland) SUI	Toni Ročak (to (Switzerland) Lions de Genève)
22	C	(Latvia) LAT	Raivo Butirins (to (United States) Kansas City Roos)
15	C	(Ukraine) UKR	Rostyslav Novitskyi (to (Romania) CS Dinamo București)
5	PG	(Latvia) LAT	Adrians Andževs (to (Latvia) Latvijas Universitāte)
3	PG	(United States) USA	Kamau Stokes (free agent)
16	C	(United States) USA	Brandon Huffman (to (Russia) BC Avtodor)
23	C	(United States) USA	Amari Kelly* (free agent)

* Left/joined the team during the season

=== Historical rosters ===
2025/2026 season roster
Pos.	Starting 5	Bench 1	Bench 2	Reserves	Left team during season
C	(United States) #16 Brandon Huffman	(Switzerland) #20 Toni Ročak	(Latvia) #22 Raivo Butirins	(Ukraine) #15 Rostyslav Novitskyi	(Puerto Rico) #12 Arnaldo Toro
PF	(Latvia) #1 Rodrigo Būmeisters	(Latvia) #13 Māris Gulbis	(Latvia) #7 Rihards Aleksandrovs	(Latvia) #11 Ričards Vanags	(United States) #6 Ben Carlson
SF	(United States) #0 Curtis Hollis	(Latvia) #35 Kristaps Ķilps			(United States) #0 Zahir Porter
SG	(Latvia) #9 Dairis Bertāns C	(Ukraine) #55 Illya Sydorov	(Latvia) #32 Jēkabs Niedra	(Latvia) #33 Rihards Berkolds	
PG	(United States) #3 Kamau Stokes	(Latvia) #5 Adrians Andževs		(Latvia) #4 Tomass Latiševs	(Latvia) #44 Toms Leimanis

2024/2025 season roster
Pos.	Starting 5	Bench 1	Bench 2
C	(United States) #40 Jaquan Lawrence	(Latvia) #17 Pēteris Pinnis	
PF	(Ukraine) #3 Vyacheslav Bobrov	(Latvia) #13 Māris Gulbis	(Latvia) #7 Rihards Aleksandrovs
SF	(Ukraine) #30 Issuf Sanon	(Latvia) #16 Kristaps Soldatenoks	(Latvia) #2 Otto Fārenhorsts
SG	(Latvia) #9 Dairis Bertāns C	(Latvia) #33 Rihards Berkolds	(Latvia) #65 Dāvis Matīss Žillde
PG	(United States) #0 Harrison Cleary	(Latvia) #1 Rodrigo Būmeisters	(Ukraine) #55 Illya Sidorov

=== FIBA Hall of Famers ===
VEF Rīga Hall of Famers
Players
No.	Nat.	Name	Position	Tenure	Inducted
10	(Latvia)	Valdis Valters	G	1976–1989	2015

=== Notable former players ===
- (Latvia) Artis Ate
- (Latvia) Ainars Bagatskis
- (Latvia) Dairis Bertāns
- (Latvia) Artūrs Bērziņš
- (Latvia) Jānis Bērziņš
- (Latvia) Kaspars Bērziņš
- (Latvia) Roberts Bērziņš
- (Latvia) Jānis Blūms
- (Latvia) Roberts Blūms
- (Latvia) Rolands Freimanis
- (Latvia) Raitis Grafs
- (Latvia) Andrejs Gražulis
- (Latvia) Māris Gulbis
- (Latvia) Gatis Jahovičs
- (Latvia) Ingus Jakovičs
- (Latvia) Kristaps Janičenoks
- (Latvia) Edgars Jeromanovs
- (Latvia) Verners Kohs
- (Latvia) Jānis Krūmiņš
- (Latvia) Rihards Kuksiks
- (Latvia) Artūrs Kurucs
- (Latvia) Rodions Kurucs
- (Latvia) Mārtiņš Laksa
- (Latvia) Andris Misters
- (Latvia) Mārtiņš Meiers
- (Latvia) Mareks Mejeris
- (Latvia) Igors Miglinieks
- (Latvia) Raimonds Miglinieks
- (Latvia) Kārlis Muižnieks
- (Latvia) Cēzars Ozers
- (Latvia) Anžejs Pasečņiks
- (Latvia) Žanis Peiners
- (Latvia) Artūrs Strēlnieks
- (Latvia) Aigars Šķēle
- (Latvia) Armands Šķēle
- (Latvia) Andrejs Šeļakovs
- (Latvia) Jānis Timma
- (Latvia) Maigonis Valdmanis
- (Latvia) Sandis Valters
- (Latvia) Valdis Valters
- (Latvia) Kaspars Vecvagars
- (Latvia) Gundars Vētra
- (Latvia) Ričmonds Vilde
- (Latvia) Ronalds Zaķis
- (Latvia) Kristers Zoriks
- (United States) Jamar Abrams
- (United States) Brendan Adams
- (United States) Andrew Andrews
- (United States) Kyle Allman
- (United States) Josh Bostic
- (United States) Nysier Brooks
- (United States) Dee Brown
- (United States) Da'Sean Butler
- (United States) Tyler Cain
- (United States) Paul Carter
- (United States) Justin Cobbs
- (United States) Glenn Cosey
- (United States) Vincent Council
- (United States) Ron Curry
- (United States) Will Daniels
- (United States) Kevin Dillard
- (United States) Abdul Gaddy
- (United States) Justin Hamilton
- (United States) Rayshaun Hammonds
- (United States) Josh Harrellson
- (United States) C. J. Harris
- (United States) Trevon Hughes
- (United States) Baden Jaxen
- (United States) Michale Kyser
- (United States) Jaizec Lottie
- (United States) Robert Lowery
- (United States) Austin Luke
- (United States) Quinn McDowell
- (United States) Lester Medford
- (United States) Anthony Miles
- (United States) Curtis Millage
- (United States) Keaton Nankivil
- (United States) Derrick Nix
- (United States) Marque Perry
- (United States) P.J. Pipes
- (United States) Zahir Porter
- (United States) Alex Renfroe
- (United States) Antywane Robinson
- (United States) Gerald Robinson
- (United States) LaQuinton Ross
- (United States) E. J. Rowland
- (United States) Patrick Sanders
- (United States) Courtney Sims
- (United States) Speedy Smith
- (United States) Xavier Thames
- (United States) Devondrick Walker
- (United States) Stephen Zack
- (Belarus) Artsiom Parakhouski
- (Bosnia and Herzegovina) Kenan Bajramović
- (Croatia) Kristijan Krajina
- (Estonia) Siim-Sander Vene
- (Finland) Alexander Madsen
- (Ukraine) Issuf Sanon
- (Ukraine) Illya Sydorov
- (Ukraine) Rostyslav Novitskyi
- (Ukraine) Vyacheslav Bobrov
- (Lithuania) Antanas Kavaliauskas
- (Lithuania) Arnas Labuckas
- (Lithuania) Martynas Mažeika
- (Lithuania) Donatas Zavackas
- (Lithuania) Tomas Delininkaitis
- (Mexico) Francisco Cruz
- (Mexico) Alex Perez
- (Montenegro) Bojan Bakić
- (Nigeria) Gani Lawal
- (Puerto Rico) Isaiah Piñeiro
- (Puerto Rico) Arnaldo Toro
- (Romania) Kris Richard
- (Russia) Evgeny Kolesnikov
- (Serbia) Nemanja Bezbradica
- (Senegal) Bamba Fall
- (Spain) Guille Rubio
- (Sweden) Elijah Clarance
- (Sweden) Ludvig Håkanson

== Coaches ==
=== Coaches (after refounded) ===
- (Latvia) Valdis Valters 2007-2010
- (Latvia) Nikolajs Mazurs (a.c.) 2010
- (Lithuania) Rimas Kurtinaitis 2010-2011
- (Lithuania) Ramūnas Butautas 2011-2014
- (Latvia) Nikolajs Mazurs 2014-2015
- (Spain) Carlos Frade 2015
- (Latvia) Jānis Gailītis 2015-2024
- (Latvia) Mārtiņš Gulbis 2024-2026
- (Latvia) Jevgēnijs Kosuškins 2026-

=== Notable former coaches ===
- (Latvia) Alfrēds Krauklis
- (Latvia) Alvils Gulbis
- (Latvia) Armands Krauliņš
- (Latvia) Maigonis Valdmanis
