= Lithuania at EuroBasket 2007 =

As the participants of the 2006 FIBA World Championship, Lithuanians automatically qualified into the EuroBasket 2007, held in Spain without competing in the FIBA EuroBasket 2007 qualification. New national team coach Ramūnas Butautas debuted (the son of the famous Soviet Union national team player Stepas Butautas). The Lithuanian basketball team of 2007 finished the EuroBasket 2007 with an 8–1 record, winning their first ever bronze medal in EuroBasket tournaments. Winning the third place game in the tournament against Greece allowed Lithuania to qualify for the Olympic basketball tournament at Beijing 2008. Šarūnas Jasikevičius led the tournament in assists by averaging 5.6 assists per game. Lithuania also was one of the best scoring teams in the tournament, averaging 82.0 points per game and were outclassed only by the Spain national team which averaged 82.1 points per game.

== EuroBasket 2007 roster ==
The complete roster of the EuroBasket 2007 bronze medals winning Lithuania national team.

No	Position	Player	Year of birth	Club before EuroBasket 2007
4	Guard	Rimantas Kaukėnas	1977	(Italy) Montepaschi Siena
5	Shooting guard	Giedrius Gustas	1980	(Russia) Dynamo Moscow Region
6	Forward	Jonas Mačiulis	1985	(Lithuania) Žalgiris Kaunas
7	Center	Darjuš Lavrinovič	1979	(Russia) UNICS Kazan
8	Forward	Ramūnas Šiškauskas	1978	(Greece) Panathinaikos BC
9	Forward	Darius Songaila	1978	(United States) NBA Washington Wizards
10	Forward	Simas Jasaitis	1982	(Israel) Maccabi
11	Forward	Linas Kleiza	1985	(United States) NBA Denver Nuggets
12	Forward	Kšyštof Lavrinovič	1979	(Russia) UNICS Kazan
13	Point guard	Šarūnas Jasikevičius	1976	(United States) NBA Golden State Warriors
14	Forward	Paulius Jankūnas	1984	(Lithuania) Žalgiris Kaunas
15	Center	Robertas Javtokas	1980	(Greece) Panathinaikos BC

- coach Ramūnas Butautas
- assistant Rimas Kurtinaitis
- assistant Robertas Kuncaitis
- assistant Donaldas Kairys
- assistant Virginijus Mikalauskas
- press officer Linas Kunigėlis
- doctor Vytenis Trumpickas
- doctor Rimtautas Gudas

== EuroBasket 2007 games ==
=== Preliminary round ===
Lithuania been a part of the Group C, along with Germany, Turkey and Czech Republic national teams. They took the first place in the group after reaching all three victories.

3 September
20:30

Boxscore

Turkey	69–86	Lithuania
Scoring by quarter: 16–19, 20–25, 12–19, 21–23
Pts: Türkoğlu 18; Rebs: Okur 10; Asts: 3 Players 2		Pts: Jasikevičius 18; Rebs: Jasikevičius, K. Lavrinovič 8 Asts: Jasikevičius 7

Palma Arena, Palma de Mallorca
Attendance: 3,620
Referees: Dubravko Muhvić (CRO), Ilija Belošević (SRB), Zoran Šutulović (MNE)

4 September
18:00

Boxscore

Lithuania	95–75	Czech Republic
Scoring by quarter: 32–15, 22–16, 18–24, 23–20
Pts: K. Lavrinovič 22; Rebs: 3 Players 5 Asts: Kaukėnas 5		Pts: Welsch 18; Rebs: Bartoň 8 Asts: Welsch, Whitfield 6

Palma Arena, Palma de Mallorca
Attendance: 5,423
Referees: Dubravko Muhvić (CRO), Zoran Šutulović (MNE), Oļegs Latiševs (LAT)

5 September
18:00

Boxscore

Lithuania	84–80	Germany
Scoring by quarter: 30–17, 19–15, 19–25, 16–23
Pts: D. Lavrinovič 18; Rebs: Kaukėnas 9 Asts: Jasikevičius 10		Pts: Nowitzki 28; Rebs: Nowitzki 9 Asts: Nowitzki 2

Palma Arena, Palma de Mallorca
Attendance: 5,983
Referees: Nikolaos Zavlanos (GRE), Juan Arteaga (ESP), Ilija Belošević (SRB)

=== Second round ===
At the second round Lithuania national team been a part of the Group F. They took first place in the group there as well, defeating all the opponents again.

8 September
19:00

Boxscore

Italy	74–79	Lithuania
Scoring by quarter: 13–21, 26–19, 22–22, 13–17
Pts: Bargnani 15; Rebs: Bargnani 7 Asts: Marconato 2		Pts: Kaukėnas 22; Rebs: Kleiza 9 Asts: Jasikevičius 4

Madrid Arena, Madrid
Attendance: 5,500
Referees: Nikolaos Zavlanos (GRE), Volodymyr Drabikovskyi (UKR), Milivoje Jovčić (SRB)

10 September
19:00

Boxscore

Lithuania	88–73	France
Scoring by quarter: 19–18, 29–14, 20–28, 20–13
Pts: Šiškauskas 19; Rebs: Songaila 7 Asts: Jasikevičius 7		Pts: Piétrus 13; Rebs: Diaw 7 Asts: Parker 6

Madrid Arena, Madrid
Referees: Nikolaos Zavlanos (GRE), Sreten Radović (CRO), Vicente Bulto (ESP)

12 September
21:30

Boxscore

Slovenia	61–80	Lithuania
Scoring by quarter: 18–26, 23–18, 8–19, 12–17
Pts: Lakovič 15; Rebs: Nesterović 5 Asts: Lakovič 3		Pts: Šiškauskas 21; Rebs: Kleiza 7 Asts: Kaukėnas 4

Madrid Arena, Madrid
Attendance: 6,500
Referees: Zoran Šutulović (MNE), Vicente Bulto (ESP), Borys Ryzhyk (UKR)

=== Knockout stage ===
==== Quarterfinals ====
14 September
19:00

Boxscore

Lithuania	74–72	Croatia
Scoring by quarter: 17–19, 21–16, 15–20, 21–17
Pts: Songaila 20; Rebs: Kleiza 9 Asts: Jasikevičius 8		Pts: Planinić 16; Rebs: Barać 6 Asts: Planinić 5

Palacio de Deportes de la Comunidad de Madrid, Madrid
Referees: Lazaros Voreadis (GRE), Saša Pukl (SLO), Oliver Krause (GER)

==== Semi-finals ====
15 September
21:30

Boxscore

Russia	86–74	Lithuania
Scoring by quarter: 25–12, 15–21, 25–25, 21–16
Pts: Kirilenko 29; Rebs: Kirilenko 8 Asts: Khryapa 4		Pts: Šiškauskas 30; Rebs: Songaila 6 Asts: Šiškauskas 4

Palacio de Deportes de la Comunidad de Madrid, Madrid
Referees: Luigi Lamonica (ITA), Dubravko Muhvić (CRO), Zoran Šutulović (MNE)

==== Third place ====
16 September
19:00

Boxscore

Greece	69–78	Lithuania
Scoring by quarter: 19–20, 15–21, 20–21, 15–16
Pts: Zisis 23; Rebs: Diamantidis 7 Asts: Diamantidis 4		Pts: K. Lavrinovič 19; Rebs: Kleiza 8 Asts: K. Lavrinovič, Šiškauskas 5

Palacio de Deportes de la Comunidad de Madrid, Madrid
Referees: Fabio Facchini (ITA), Dubravko Muhvić (CRO), Saša Pukl (SLO)
