= Carmel Christian School =

Carmel Christian School may refer to:

- Mount Carmel Christian School, Pennsylvania, USA
- Carmel Christian School, Bristol, UK
- Carmel Christian School, Charlotte, USA
