= Frade =

Frade is a surname. Notable people with the surname include:

- Carlos Frade (born 1974), Spanish basketball manager
- Henrique Frade (1934–2004), Brazilian footballer
- Julio Frade (1943–2025), Uruguayan pianist, actor, comedian and radio host
- Leo Frade (born 1943), Cuban-born American Episcopal bishop
- Luis Frade (born 1998), Portuguese handball player
- Ramón Frade (1875–1954), Puerto Rican visual artist and architect

== See also ==
- Orochinho (born 2000), Brazilian streamer and YouTuber
