= 2019–20 Latvian–Estonian Basketball League =

Latvian–Estonian Basketball League
- Season: 2019–20
- Duration: 27 September 2019 – 11 March 2020
- Games played: 189
- Teams: 15
- TV partners: Best4Sport TV, TTV, Delfi TV

Finals
- Champions: Null and void

The 2019–20 Latvian–Estonian Basketball League, known as Paf Latvian–Estonian Basketball League for sponsorship reasons, was the 2nd season of the Latvian–Estonian Basketball League, the combined top basketball division of Latvia and Estonia.

On 12 March 2020, the league was suspended until further notice due to the COVID-19 pandemic. Eventually, the league was not resumed and no champions were named.

== Competition format ==
The competition format follows the usual double round-robin format. During the course of the regular season, which lasts from 27 September 2019 to 22 March 2020, all the teams play each other twice, once at home and once away, for a total of 28 games. Teams are ranked by total points, with the eight highest-ranked teams advancing to the quarter-finals. Unlike the previous season, in this season the quarterfinal series will be played to two wins. The winning teams will determine the champion in a Final Four tournament.

== Teams ==
Location of the 2019–20 Latvian–Estonian Basketball League teams

15 teams, 8 from Estonia and 7 from Latvia, are contesting the league in the 2019–20 season.

=== Venues and locations ===
Team	Home city	Arena
(Estonia) Avis Utilitas Rapla	Rapla	Sadolin Sports Hall
(Latvia) Jūrmala Betsafe	Jūrmala	Jurmala State Gymnasium Sports Hall
(Estonia) Kalev/Cramo	Tallinn	Kalev Sports Hall
(Latvia) Latvijas Universitāte	Rīga	Elektrum Olympic Sports Center
(Latvia) Liepāja	Liepāja	Liepāja Olympic Center
(Latvia) Ogre	Ogre	Ogre 1st Secondary School
(Estonia) Pärnu Sadam	Pärnu	Pärnu Sports Hall
(Estonia) Rakvere Tarvas	Rakvere	Rakvere Sports Hall
(Estonia) Tallinna Kalev/TLÜ	Tallinn	Sõle Sports Centre
(Estonia) TalTech	Tallinn	TalTech Sports Hall
(Estonia) Tartu Ülikool	Tartu	University of Tartu Sports Hall
(Estonia) Valga-Valka/Maks & Moorits	Valga	Valga Sports Hall
(Latvia) Valmiera Glass VIA	Valmiera	Vidzeme Olympic Center
(Latvia) VEF Rīga	Rīga	Elektrum Olympic Sports Center
(Latvia) Ventspils	Ventspils	Ventspils Olympic Center

== Regular season ==
=== League table ===
Pos	Team	Pld	W	L	PF	PA	PD	PCT	Qualification
1	(Latvia) VEF Rīga	25	23	2	2157	1799	+358	.920	Qualification for Champions League (Note: VEF Rīga qualifies for the 2020–21 Basketball Champions League as highest-ranked Latvian team.)
2	(Latvia) Ogre	25	22	3	2286	1974	+312	.880	
3	(Estonia) Kalev/Cramo	23	20	3	2120	1606	+514	.870	
4	(Latvia) Ventspils	24	18	6	2255	1789	+466	.750	
5	(Estonia) Avis Utilitas Rapla	24	12	12	1856	1909	−53	.500	
6	(Latvia) Jūrmala Betsafe	22	11	11	1702	1664	+38	.500	
7	(Estonia) Pärnu Sadam	25	12	13	2046	2100	−54	.480	
8	(Estonia) Tartu Ülikool	24	10	14	1783	1972	−189	.417	
9	(Estonia) Rakvere Tarvas	24	10	14	1899	2032	−133	.417	
10	(Estonia) Tallinna Kalev/TLÜ	24	8	16	2019	2110	−91	.333	
11	(Latvia) Valmiera Glass/ViA	24	7	17	1927	2154	−227	.292	
12	(Estonia) TalTech	25	7	18	2035	2295	−260	.280	
13	(Latvia) Latvijas Universitāte	24	5	19	1684	1981	−297	.208	
14	(Latvia) Liepāja	23	3	20	1773	2157	−384	.130	
15	(Estonia) Valga-Valka/Maks & Moorits (Note: Valga/Valkga retired from competition.) (D)	0	0	0	0	0	0	—	Retired

Source: estlatbl.com
(D) Disqualified

=== Results ===
Home \ Away	RAP	JUR	KAL	LUN	LIE	OGR	PAR	RAK	TLU	TCH	TRT	VLG	VLM	VEF	VEN
Avis Utilitas Rapla	—	91–80	60–92	80–54	80–66	75–89	86–68	81–89	90–78	86–69	90–76	−	0	66–73	69–91
Jūrmala Betsafe	70–52	—	68–56	91–53	81–80	90–87	78–80	76–75	0	93–57	87–88	93−75	92–100	62–72	62–69
Kalev/Cramo	92–68	0	—	73–50	100–70	92–95	109–60	104–77	111–65	108–82	87–62	93−67	96–61	0	77–95
Latvijas Universitāte	66–69	0	49–85	—	102–92	76–88	70–88	78–86	83–80	71–63	65–59	83−74	72–82	64–70	61–98
Liepāja	87–92	0	59–98	77–107	—	91–109	90–86	65–81	88–77	85–97	93–87	90−77	93–101	76–81	46–97
Ogre	81–73	85–83	0	94–78	102–68	—	77–71	112–85	86–84	98–79	91–61	100−66	102–67	70–88	97–92
Pärnu Sadam	87–64	68–61	58–107	0	126–80	75–81	—	94–75	93–89	94–82	85–77	73−71	89–64	79–76	76–110
Rakvere Tarvas	0	72–81	72–95	76–67	89–80	79–102	61–74	—	80–76	95–86	84–88	108−101	95–89	65–100	87–78
Tallinna Kalev/TLÜ	76–84	74–81	89–99	94–74	0	72–82	102–99	89–76	—	98–77	73–68	86−75	98–79	96–99	84–105
TalTech	90–98	76–73	61–102	85–73	85–78	80–83	94–83	79–78	97–116	—	81–85	20−0	100–103	91–122	83–95
Tartu Ülikool	80–70	77–80	71–94	80–65	0	76–97	82–73	84–66	96–80	100–66	—	−	65–63	56–83	70–99
Valga-Valka/Maks & Moorits	75−86	65−87	60−112	66−81	84−76	−	−	74−87	0−20	83−90	84−90	—	88−98	57−97	73−112
Valmiera Glass/ViA	68–73	74–87	80–87	86–72	94–59	68–114	76–75	74–87	90–98	104–106	0	100−86	—	74–87	74–98
VEF Rīga	91–85	99–71	69–70	88–58	76–70	82–71	85–74	80–69	76–70	74–69	107–57	−	102–84	—	98–80
Ventspils	96–74	79–55	85–86	97–76	109–80	89–93	124–91	0	97–61	0	93–38	109−71	107–72	72–79	—

Updated to match(es) played on 11 March 2020. Source: estlatbl.com
Legend: Blue = home team win; Red = away team win.

== Estonian championship ==
The national play-off was cancelled due to the COVID-19 pandemic. The ranking (no champion, no medallists) was set:

1. Kalev/Cramo
2. Avis Utilitas Rapla
3. Pärnu Sadam
4. Tartu Ülikool
5. Rakvere Tarvas
6. Tallinna Kalev/TLÜ
7. TalTech

DQ Valga-Valka/Maks & Moorits

== Latvian championship ==
The national play-off was cancelled due to the COVID-19 pandemic. The classification was made based on overall results in 2019–20 Latvian–Estonian Basketball League as of 13 March:

1. VEF Rīga
2. Ogre
3. Ventspils
4. SilJa^{1}
5. Valmiera Glass/ViA
6. Latvijas Universitāte
7. Liepāja

^{1} The club Jūrmala Betsafe changed its name to SilJa in mid-March.
