= Aminu Mohammed (basketball) =

Nigerian basketball player (born 2001)

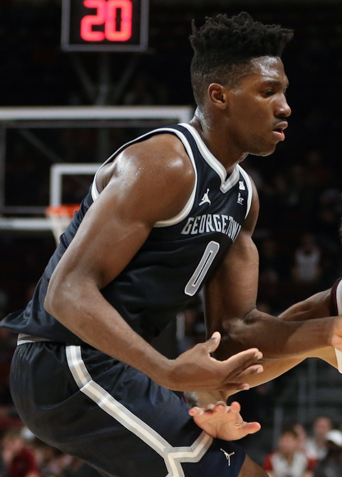
- Mohammed with Georgetown in 2021

No. 24 – Valmiera Glass ViA
- Position: Shooting guard / small forward
- League: LEBL

Personal information
- Born: December 15, 2001 (age 24) Lagos, Nigeria
- Listed height: 1.96 m (6 ft 5 in)
- Listed weight: 95 kg (209 lb)

Career information
- High school: Archbishop Carroll (Washington, D.C.); Greenwood Laboratory School (Springfield, Missouri)
- College: Georgetown (2021–2022)
- NBA draft: 2022: undrafted
- Playing career: 2022–present

Career history
- 2022–2026: Delaware Blue Coats
- 2026: Club Africain
- 2026–present: Valmiera Glass Via

Career highlights
- NBA G League champion (2023); McDonald's All-American (2021); Mr. Show-Me Basketball (2021)
- Stats at NBA.com
- Stats at Basketball Reference

Aminu Mohammed (born December 15, 2001) is a Nigerian professional basketball player for the Valmiera Glass Via of the Latvian–Estonian Basketball League. He played college basketball for the Georgetown Hoyas.

== Early life ==
Mohammed grew up in Lagos, Nigeria. At age 14, he moved to the United States to attend Archbishop Carroll High School in Washington, D.C. In his freshman season, Mohammed earned First Team All-Washington Catholic Athletic Conference honors, before transferring to Greenwood Laboratory School in Springfield, Missouri. As a sophomore, he averaged 34.2 points and 17.5 rebounds, leading his team to a Missouri Class 2 state title, its first state title since 1942. He was named Class 2 District 10 Player of the Year and Missouri Gatorade Player of the Year. As a junior, Mohammed averaged 34.8 points and 15.7 rebounds per game. In his senior season, he earned Mr. Show-Me Basketball, McDonald's All-American, and Jordan Brand Classic honors. Mohammed scored 2,709 points at Greenwood, the most in Springfield history.

Mohammed was rated a five-star recruit by 247Sports and Rivals, and a four-star recruit by ESPN. On December 21, 2020, he committed to playing college basketball for Georgetown over offers from Georgia, Indiana, Kansas State, Texas, SMU and DePaul. He became the highest-ranked player to commit to Georgetown since Isaac Copeland in 2014. Mohammed was the first five-star recruit during the tenure of head coach Patrick Ewing.

College recruiting
Name	Hometown	School	Height	Weight	Commit date
Aminu Mohammed; SG	Lagos, Nigeria	Greenwood Laboratory School (MO)	6 ft 4 in (1.93 m)	190 lb (86 kg)	Dec 21, 2020
Aminu Mohammed; SG	Recruit ratings: Rivals: 247Sports: ESPN: (89)				
Overall recruit ranking: Rivals: 19 247Sports: 24 ESPN: 27
Note: In many cases, Scout, Rivals, 247Sports, On3, and ESPN may conflict in their listings of height and weight.; In these cases, the average was taken. ESPN grades are on a 100-point scale.; Sources: "Georgetown 2021 Basketball Commitments". Rivals.; "2021 Georgetown Hoyas Recruiting Class". ESPN.; "2021 Team Ranking". Rivals.

== College career ==
Prior to the beginning of his freshman season, Mohammed was selected as the Big East Preseason Freshman of the Year. In his debut, he scored 17 points and had six rebounds in a 69–60 loss to Dartmouth. Mohammed scored a season-high 27 points and had 10 rebounds in an 88–77 loss to Creighton on February 14, 2022. As a freshman, he averaged 13.7 points, 8.2 rebounds and 1.8 assists per game. On March 31, 2022, Mohammed declared for the 2022 NBA draft while maintaining his college eligibility. He later decided to remain in the draft.

== Professional career ==
On November 4, 2022, Mohammed was named to the opening-night roster for the Delaware Blue Coats and eventually helped the team win the NBA G League title.

== Career statistics ==
Legend
GP	Games played	GS	Games started	MPG	Minutes per game
FG%	Field goal percentage	3P%	3-point field goal percentage	FT%	Free throw percentage
RPG	Rebounds per game	APG	Assists per game	SPG	Steals per game
BPG	Blocks per game	PPG	Points per game	**Bold**	Career high

=== College ===
Year	Team	GP	GS	MPG	FG%	3P%	FT%	RPG	APG	SPG	BPG	PPG
2021–22	Georgetown	31	31	32.2	.379	.310	.722	8.2	1.8	1.6	.6	13.7

== Personal life ==
Mohammed's older brother, Kabir, played college basketball for San Jacinto College before transferring to Missouri State. His former high school coach, Shawn Harmon, became his legal guardian in 2015 after taking in his brother two years earlier.
