= Māris Gulbis =

Latvian basketball player

RSU/VEF Rīga
- Position: Head coach
- League: RNBL

Personal information
- Born: October 4, 1985 (age 41) Riga, Latvian SSR, Soviet Union
- Listed height: 6 ft 7 in (2.01 m)
- Listed weight: 222 lb (101 kg)

Career information
- Playing career: 2000–2025, 2026
- Number: 21, 8, 22, 13
- Coaching career: 2025–present

Career history

Playing
- 2000–2001: BK Lainers
- 2001–2005: BK Barons Kvartāls
- 2005–2006: BK Valmiera
- 2006–2007: BK Barons Kvartāls
- 2007–2009: VEF Rīga
- 2009–2010: BK Zemgale
- 2010: BC Šiauliai
- 2010–2011: BK Ventspils
- 2011–2012: Vitória S.C.
- 2012–2013: BK Barons Kvartāls
- 2013–2021: BK Ventspils
- 2021–2025, 2026: VEF Rīga

Coaching
- 2025–present: RSU/VEF Rīga

Career highlights
- 6x LBL champion (2014, 2018, 2022, 2023, 2024, 2025); 3x Latvian-Estonian League champion (2019, 2022, 2025); 4x Latvian Cup winner (2022, 2023, 2024, 2025)

Māris Gulbis (born October 4, 1985) is a Latvian professional basketball player who currently plays for the VEF Rīga. He is 2.00 m (6 ft 7 in) and can play small forward and power forward positions.

== Personal life ==
Māris has an younger brother Mārtiņš Gulbis
