= Jordan Sears =

American basketball player (born 2001)

No. 3 – BK VEF Rīga
- Position: Point guard
- League: LEBL; FIBA Europe Cup

Personal information
- Born: September 5, 2001 (age 25) Port Orange, Florida, U.S.
- Listed height: 5 ft 11 in (1.80 m)
- Listed weight: 185 lb (84 kg)

Career information
- High school: Mainland High School (Daytona Beach, Florida)
- College: Gardner-Webb (2020–2022); Tennessee-Martin (2022-2024); LSU (2024-25)
- NBA draft: 2025: undrafted
- Playing career: 2025–present

Career history
- 2025–2026: BG Göttingen
- 2026-present: VEF Rīga

Jordan T'Angelo Sears (born September 5, 2001) is an American professional basketball player for VEF Rīga of the Latvian–Estonian Basketball League and FIBA Europe Cup.

== High school career ==
Sears attended Mainland High School in Florida, where he became one of the area's leading high school basketball players. He was named Daytona News-Journal Player of the Year twice and earned All-Area honors three times. Over his final three high school seasons, Sears scored 1,454 points. As a senior, he averaged 20.2 points, 6.0 rebounds, 4.4 assists and 2.8 steals per game. He recorded a season-high 30 points against Osceola High School and posted 29 points, 11 rebounds and seven assists against Naples High School.

As a junior in 2019, Sears was named a first-team Class 7A All-State selection by the Associated Press and was also named Daytona News-Journal Area Player of the Year. He averaged 16.2 points and 4.3 assists per game while shooting 51.1 percent from the field and 39.3 percent from three-point range for one of Florida's top high school teams. Sears also played travel basketball for CP25 Team Parsons and played slot receiver for Mainland's football team as a junior.

== College career ==
Sears began his college career at Gardner-Webb, playing two seasons from 2020 to 2022. As a freshman in 2020–21, he appeared in 26 games and averaged 9.3 points, 2.3 rebounds and 2.1 assists per game. In his sophomore season, he averaged 8.1 points, 2.7 rebounds and 2.3 assists in 31 games.

Sears transferred to Tennessee–Martin for the 2022–23 season. As a junior, he averaged 15.3 points, 3.4 rebounds and 2.8 assists per game, earning OVC All-Newcomer Team honors, as well as a place on the All-OVC First Team and OVC All-Tournament Team. He was also named OVC Newcomer of the Week once and OVC Player of the Week three times.

In his senior season at Tennessee–Martin in 2023–24, Sears averaged 21.6 points, 4.6 rebounds and 4.5 assists per game while shooting 43.2 percent from the field and 43.2 percent from three-point range. He was named to the All-OVC First Team and OVC All-Tournament Team for the second consecutive year and was selected to the NABC All-District 18 First Team. Sears transferred to LSU for the 2024–25 season, averaging 12.2 points, 2.8 rebounds and 2.5 assists per game. Over his five-year college career, he averaged 13.5 points, 3.2 rebounds and 2.9 assists in 153 games.

== Professional career ==
On July 14, 2025, after going undrafted in the 2025 NBA Draft, Sears signed with the BG Göttingen in German second division ProA.

On July 28, 2026, he signed for VEF Rīga of Latvian-Estonian Basketball League. On September 14, 2026, Sears scored career-high 38 points in a Basketball Champions League qualifiers' game against Landau Lions.
