= 2017–18 Latvian Basketball League =

Olybet LBL^{1}
- Season: 2017–18
- Teams: 10
- TV partner(s): LTV7

Finals
- Champions: Ventspils (10th title)
- Runners-up: VEF Rīga
- Semifinalists: Jūrmala; Ogre
- ^{1} Sponsored league name, referring to Olybet.

The 2017–18 Latvian Basketball League was the 27th and last season of the top basketball league of Latvia. VEF Rīga was the defending champions. Eventually, Rīga lost the final to Ventspils by 2–4.

== Competition format ==
The same ten teams from the previous season will join the league. The two first qualified teams will join directly the semifinals while teams between third and sixth will qualify to the quarterfinals.

== Teams ==
Location of teams in 2017–18 Latvian Basketball League

Barons withdrew from the competition.

Team	Home city	Arena
Betsafe/Liepāja	Liepāja	Liepāja Olympic Center
Jēkabpils	Jēkabpils	Jēkabpils Sporta nams
Jūrmala/Fēnikss	Jūrmala	Taurenītis
Latvijas Universitāte	Rīga	OSC
Ogre	Ogre	Ogre's Secondary School No.1
Valka/Valga	Valga, Estonia	Valga Sports Hall
Valmiera	Valmiera	Vidzeme Olympic Center
VEF Rīga	Rīga	Arena Riga
Ventspils	Ventspils	Ventspils Olympic Center

== Regular season ==
=== Table ===
Pos	Team	Pld	W	L	PF	PA	PD	PCT	Qualification
1	Ventspils	29	26	3	2503	2005	+498	.897	Qualified for the semifinals
2	VEF Rīga	23	19	4	1963	1534	+429	.826	Qualified for the semifinals
3	Jūrmala	29	22	7	2374	2128	+246	.759	Qualified for the quarterfinals
4	Ogre	29	20	9	2419	2203	+216	.690	Qualified for the quarterfinals
5	Valka/Valga	16	6	10	1126	1241	−115	.375	Qualified for the quarterfinals
6	Latvijas Universitāte	29	8	21	2132	2339	−207	.276	Qualified for the quarterfinals
7	Jēkabpils	29	8	21	2005	2246	−241	.276	
8	Betsafe/Liepāja	29	8	21	2109	2454	−345	.276	
9	Valmiera/ORDO	29	4	25	2067	2548	−481	.138	

Source: LBL

== Playoffs ==
The playoffs were played with a best-of-five games format, except for the finals, that were played in seven games. Seeded teams played games 1, 3 and 5 at home, except in the finals where the seeded team played at home games 1, 2, 5 and 7.

Quarter-finals
Ogre	94	93	85
Valka/Valga	79	81	51
Jūrmala	77	76	93
Latvijas Universitāte	75	67	49

Semi-finals
Ventspils	98	77	105	81
Ogre	77	84	93	79
VEF Rīga	91	99	80
Jūrmala	74	69	62

Final
Ventspils	94	71	66	89	96	81
VEF Rīga	87	81	76	83	73	78

Third place
Jūrmala	77	99	80
Ogre	71	83	67
