= Rodrigo Būmeisters =

Latvian basketball player

No. 1 – VEF Rīga
- Position: Shooting guard / Small forward
- League: LBL; LEBL; FIBA Europe Cup

Personal information
- Born: September 14, 2000 (age 26) Ventspils, Latvia
- Listed height: 1.96 m (6 ft 5 in)
- Listed weight: 85 kg (187 lb)

Career information
- NBA draft: 2022: undrafted
- Playing career: 2018–present

Career history
- 2018–2019: BK Jēkabpils
- 2019: Jūrmala/Fēnikss
- 2019–2020: Valka/Valga
- 2020–2021: BK Ogre
- 2021–2023: BK Ventspils
- 2023–present: VEF Rīga

Career highlights
- Latvian Estonian League champion (2025); 2× LBL champion (2024, 2025); 2x Latvian Cup champion (2024, 2025)

Rodrigo Būmeisters (born September 14, 2000) is a Latvian professional basketball player for VEF Rīga of the Latvian-Estonian Basketball League and FIBA Europe Cup.

== Playing career ==
In his childhood, Būmeisters practised judo, but later turned to basketball, developing his skills in the youth basketball system of his hometown, Ventspils. He moved to Riga at a relatively young age, playing for the youth teams of VEF, including VEF Skola.

At the senior level, he played for several Latvian Basketball League (LBL) clubs, including BK Jēkabpils, BK Jūrmala, BK Valka/Valga and BK Ogre. In 2021, he returned to his hometown to join BK Ventspils, one of Latvia's leading basketball clubs. After two seasons with Ventspils, Būmeisters signed with VEF Rīga, another leading Latvian club. With VEF Rīga, he won the Latvian Basketball League championship twice and the Latvian Basketball Cup three times.

== National team career ==
Būmeisters has represented Latvia at the under-19 and under-20 levels. In 2019, he participated in the FIBA Under-19 Basketball World Cup with the Latvia under-19 national team, which finished in 12th place.

== Personal life ==
At the age of 18, Būmeisters published a poetry collection titled Otra puse (The Other Side).
