= Jānis Gailītis =

Latvian professional basketball coach (born 1985)

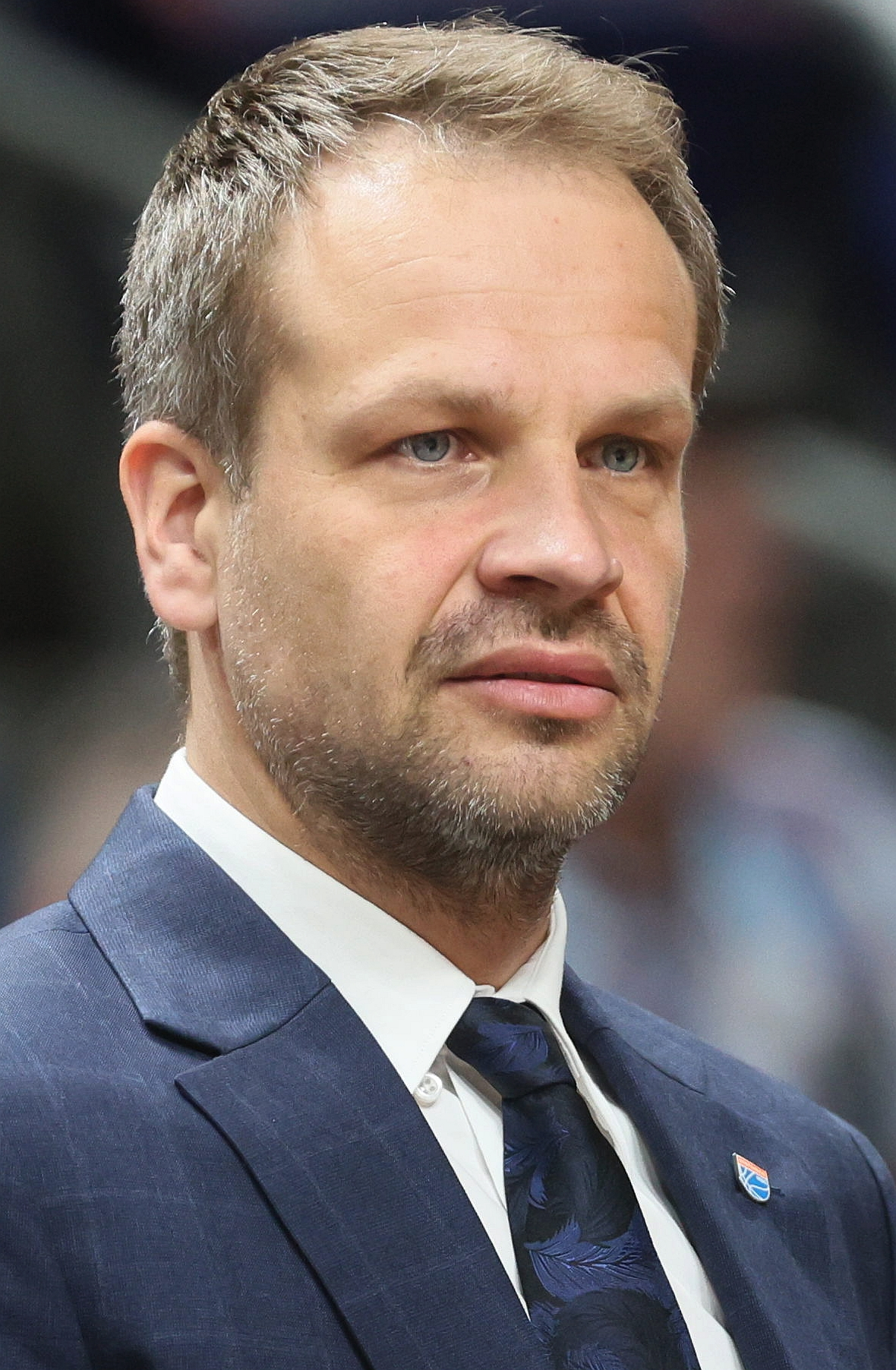
- Gailītis in 2025

SIG Strasbourg
- Title: Head coach
- League: LNB Élite; Champions League

Personal information
- Born: 23 April 1985 (age 41) Riga, Latvian SSR, USSR

Career information
- Playing career: 2002–2010
- Position: Point guard
- Number: 4
- Coaching career: 2010–present

Career history

Playing
- 2002–2004: BK Skonto
- 2004–2007: ASK Juniors
- 2007–2010: VEF Rīga

Coaching
- 2010–2015: VEF Rīga (assistant)
- 2015–2024: VEF Rīga
- 2021–2025: Latvia (assistant)
- 2024–2025: Mitteldeutscher
- 2025–present: SIG Strasbourg
- 2026–present: Latvia

Career highlights
- German Cup Winner (2025)
Medals
Men's basketball
Representing Latvia
FIBA Europe Under-16 Championship
Silver medal – second place	2014 Latvia	Team

Jānis Gailītis (born 23 April 1985) is a Latvian former professional basketball player, and current head coach for SIG Strasbourg of the LNB Élite and the Latvian national team.

== Coaching career ==
From 2002 until 2011, Gailītis was a professional basketball player. He played for such teams as Skonto, ASK Rīga and VEF Rīga. Since 2007, he was player-manager for VEF Rīga but at the 2010–2011 season was promoted to assistant coach. On 17 December 2015, Gailītis took over the head coaching duties after Carlos Frade was fired. With Gailītis at the helm, VEF has won five Latvian championships and reached VTB United League quarter-finals twice.

German Bundesliga side Mitteldeutscher BC announced on 3 June 2024, that Gailītis agreed to become the new head coach of the team.

On 11 June 2025, he signed with SIG Strasbourg of the French LNB Pro A.

== National team career ==
In 2011 and 2013, he was the assistant coach for Latvian U16 team. In 2014, Gailītis was the head coach for Latvian U16 team, which won a silver medal at the FIBA Europe U16 Championship. In 2015, he was the head coach for Latvian U18 team.

In 2021, Gailītis was named as an assistant coach on Luca Banchi's staff with the senior Latvia national team. On 24 March 2026, Gailītis was appointed as head coach of Latvia.

== Honors and awards ==
=== Club career ===
- (Germany) Mitteldeutscher BC
  - 1x German Cup: (2025)
- (Latvia) BK VEF Rīga
  - 7x Latvian Basketball League Gold: (2017, 2019-2024)
  - 1x Latvian-Estonian Basketball League Gold: (2022)
  - 3x Latvian Cup: (2022-2024)
  - 3x Latvian-Estonian Basketball League Silver: (2019, 2021, 2023)
  - 2x Latvian Basketball League Silver: (2016, 2018)
  - 1x Latvian-Estonian Basketball League Bronze: (2024)

=== National team ===
- FIBA Europe U-16 Championship Runner Up: (2014)
