= Aniwaniwa Tait-Jones =

New Zealand basketball player (born 2001)

No. 29 – Coachella Valley Lakers
- Position: Small forward
- League: NBA G League

Personal information
- Born: 5 January 2001 (age 25) Wellington, New Zealand
- Listed height: 6 ft 6 in (1.98 m)
- Listed weight: 200 lb (91 kg)

Career information
- High school: St Patrick's College (Wellington, New Zealand)
- College: Hawaii–Hilo (2020–2023); UC San Diego (2023–2025)
- NBA draft: 2025: undrafted
- Playing career: 2019–present

Career history
- 2019: Wellington Saints
- 2025–2026: Valmiera Glass Via
- 2026–present: Coachella Valley Lakers

Career highlights
- LBL champion (2026); Latvian-Estonian Basketball League champion (2026); Latvian–Estonian Basketball League Final MVP (2026); Latvian Cup winner (2026); NZNBL champion (2019); Big West Player of the Year (2025); First-team All-Big West (2025); Big West tournament MVP (2025); Big West Newcomer of the Year (2024)
- Stats at NBA.com
- Stats at Basketball Reference

Aniwaniwa Alan Tait-Jones (born 5 January 2001) is a New Zealand basketball player for the Coachella Valley Lakers of the NBA G League. He played college basketball for the UC San Diego Tritons and the Hawaii–Hilo Vulcans. He previously played for the Wellington Saints of the NBL.

== Career ==
Tait-Jones attended St Patrick's College in Wellington, New Zealand. After graduating, Tait-Jones played for the Wellington Saints for a season, before committing to play college basketball in the United States at the University of Hawaiʻi at Hilo. After three seasons with Hawaii–Hilo, he transferred to the University of California, San Diego. In his second season with the Tritons, he was named the Big West Player of the Year and selected in the 2024-25 All Big West First Team.

== Professional career ==
On June 27, 2025, after going undrafted in the 2025 NBA draft, Tait-Jones signed an NBA Summer league contract with the Toronto Raptors. On August 26, 2025, he signed a contract with Valmiera Glass VIA in Latvia.

== Career statistics ==
Legend
GP	Games played	GS	Games started	MPG	Minutes per game
FG%	Field goal percentage	3P%	3-point field goal percentage	FT%	Free throw percentage
RPG	Rebounds per game	APG	Assists per game	SPG	Steals per game
BPG	Blocks per game	PPG	Points per game	**Bold**	Career high

=== College ===
Year	Team	GP	GS	MPG	FG%	3P%	FT%	RPG	APG	SPG	BPG	PPG
2020–21	Hawaii-Hilo	12	12	29.9	.503	.313	.688	8.5	1.8	1.2	1.2	16.5
2021–22	Hawaii-Hilo	27	27	30.1	.497	.242	.739	8.0	2.4	1.5	.7	17.0
2022–23	Hawaii-Hilo	23	23	32.7	.466	.259	.701	9.2	3.5	1.2	.4	17.6
2023–24	UC San Diego	33	33	29.6	.561	.346	.731	5.8	2.9	1.1	.3	13.8
2024–25	UC San Diego	35	35	29.6	.576	.313	.751	5.4	3.6	1.2	.4	19.1
