= Luis Rodríguez Jr. =

Panamanian basketball player (born 1999)

No. 15 – BK VEF Rīga
- Position: Small Forward
- League: LEBL; FIBA Europe Cup

Personal information
- Born: March 15, 1999 (age 27) Los Angeles, U.S.
- Listed height: 6 ft 6 in (1.98 m)
- Listed weight: 220 lb (100 kg)

Career information
- High school: Woodstock Academy (Woodstock, Connecticut)
- College: Ole Miss (2018–2022); UNLV (2022–2024)
- NBA draft: 2024: undrafted
- Playing career: 2024–present

Career history
- 2024–2025: Mexico City Capitanes
- 2025: Indios de San Francisco de Macorís
- 2025-2026: Franca BC
- 2026-present: VEF Rīga

Luis Carlos Rodríguez Jr. (born March 15, 1999) is an Panamanian professional basketball player for VEF Rīga of the Latvian–Estonian Basketball League and FIBA Europe Cup.

== High school career ==
Rodríguez attended Westchester High School in Los Angeles, where he earned four letters under head coach Ed Azzam. As a freshman, he averaged 8.0 points and 5.0 rebounds per game, followed by 12.0 points and 7.0 rebounds as a sophomore. During the 2015–16 season, Rodríguez helped lead the Comets to the CIF Los Angeles City Section championship, averaging 14.0 points and 8.0 rebounds per game. As a senior, Rodríguez averaged a double-double with 19.0 points and 10.0 rebounds per game and was named to the first-team CIF Los Angeles City Section All-City team. He later attended Woodstock Academy in Connecticut, where he averaged 14 points, seven rebounds and three assists per game. He earned first-team all-conference honors while helping the team finish 35–5, win the Power 5 Conference title and achieve a No. 3 national ranking. Rodríguez was rated a four-star recruit in the 2018 class and was ranked the No. 1 player in Connecticut and No. 143 nationally by 247Sports. He also earned a place on his school's honor roll.

== College career ==
Rodríguez began his college career at Ole Miss in 2018–19, appearing in 25 games as a freshman. He started the first five games of the 2019–20 season before suffering a season-ending injury and receiving a medical redshirt. As a redshirt sophomore in 2020–21, he started all 28 games and averaged 7.6 points, 6.3 rebounds and 1.6 steals per game, leading the team in rebounds and steals. He recorded two double-doubles. In 2021–22, Rodríguez averaged 6.6 points, 5.5 rebounds, 1.8 assists and 1.3 steals in 32 games, making 23 starts.

Rodríguez transferred to UNLV for the 2022–23 season. In his first season with the Runnin' Rebels, he played 27 games with 22 starts and averaged 10.7 points, 5.7 rebounds, 1.5 assists and 1.7 steals per game. He recorded three double-doubles, scored a career-high 24 points against San Diego State and collected a career-high 13 rebounds against Nevada.

As a senior in 2023–24, Rodríguez appeared in 31 games and averaged 10.7 points, 6.6 rebounds, 1.5 assists and 1.6 steals in 32.1 minutes per game. He shot 41.1 percent from the field, 31.0 percent from three-point range and 77.5 percent from the free-throw line. Following the season, he was named to the Mountain West All-Defensive Team.

== Professional career ==
Rodríguez spent his first pro season in NBA G League, playing for Mexico City Capitanes. He averaged 8.4 points, 3.5 rebounds and 1.1 steals per game.

On September 20, 2025, he signed for Franca BC of Novo Basquete Brasil He helped Franca to win its fifth Brazilian championship in a row.

On July 9, 2026, Rodríguez signed for VEF Rīga of Latvian-Estonian Basketball League and FIBA Europe Cup.

== National Team ==
Luis Rodríguez has represented Panama at senior level in international basketball competitions. He made appearances at the 2025 FIBA AmeriCup and the 2027 FIBA Basketball World Cup Americas Qualifiers.
