= Nikolajs Mazurs =

Latvian basketball coach (born 1980)

South Korea
- Position: Head coach

Personal information
- Born: 13 October 1980 (age 46) Bauska, Latvian SSR, USSR
- Coaching career: 2007–present

Career history

Coaching
- 2007–2014: VEF Rīga (assistant)
- 2014–2015: VEF Rīga
- 2015: Dynamo Moscow
- 2016: VITA Tbilisi
- 2016: Avtodor
- 2017: BC UNICS (assistant)
- 2017–2019: Parma Basket
- 2019–2021: BK Ogre
- 2021–2023: Tartu Ülikool Maks & Moorits
- 2023: BC Siauliai
- 2024–2025: Valmiera Glass VIA
- 2025–present: South Korea

Career highlights
- LBL champion (2015)

Nikolajs Mazurs (born 13 October 1980) is a Latvian professional basketball coach. Since 2025, he is a head coach of South Korea men's national basketball team.

== Career ==
From 2007 till 2014 Mazurs was assistant coach for VEF Rīga but at the 2014–2015 season was promoted to head coach. After the season which ended with winning Latvian league gold medal, Mazurs signed for Dynamo Moscow but the team didn't manage to solve financial problems and didn't play, so Mazurs left even before the season started. At the age of 35, he became the head coach of Georgian team B.C. VITA Tbilisi in VTB United League. In May, 2016, Mazurs signed with BC Avtodor but was fired after the first game of the season.

In 2017, he became assistant coach for BC UNICS. Later that year Mazurs signed to become the head coach of BC Parma. After a year and a half he was fired.

In August, 2019, Mazurs became the head coach of BK Ogre After unsuccessful start of the season, he was fired in 2021. Few weeks later he signed with Tartu Ülikool Maks & Moorits.

In the summer of 2023 Mazurs signed a three-year contract with BC Siauliai. Few months later he was fired.

== National teams ==
Mazurs has been head coach for Latvian U16, U18 and U20 teams in European Championships and head coach for Latvian U19 national team at the 2021 FIBA Under-19 Basketball World Cup.

== Honors and awards ==
=== Club career ===
- (Latvia) BK VEF Rīga
  - 4x Latvian Basketball League Gold: (2011, 2012, 2013, 2015)
  - 2x Latvian-Estonian Basketball League Bronze: (2021, 2023)
  - 2x Estonian Silver: (2022, 2023)
  - 1x Estonian Basketball Cup champion: (2021)
