= Greenwood Laboratory School =

Location
- 901 S. National Ave. Springfield, Missouri; United States; 37°12′08″N 93°16′46″W

Information
- Type: Laboratory school
- Motto: Civitas Discendo (Citizenship through Learning)
- Established: 1908
- Director: Ron Snodgrass
- Faculty: 36
- Grades: K–12
- Enrollment: 396 (2023–2024)
- Campus type: Urban
- Colors: Blue and white
- Mascot: Blue Jays
- Conference: Greater Ozarks Conference
- Website: www.greenwood.missouristate.edu

Greenwood Laboratory School is a comprehensive K–12 laboratory school affiliated with, and located on the campus of, Missouri State University in Springfield, Missouri, United States.

== Enrollment ==
The school has an enrollment of approximately 374 students, and about 30 or so faculty members. As of 2011, approximately 120 students were enrolled in the high school. The average graduating class is about 30 students.

== Academics ==
The school provides education for children aged from kindergarten through to grade 12. From 2002 to 2008, the average ACT scores have ranged between 25 and 26, exceeding state and national averages by 4 to 6 points. Greenwood states that 100% of graduates go on to attend college.

== Activities ==
The Greenwood Lab School mascot is the Blue Jay and the school colors are blue and white, with black or red serving as accent colors. Activities offered include speech & debate, basketball, golf, soccer, tennis, baseball, cross country, track & field, concert band, concert choir, cheerleading, Spanish club, math club, International Culture Club, National Honor Society, Science Olympiad, fencing, archery, and student council. Football was formerly a sport until the early 1990s when soccer was given preference over football. Girls Soccer was started in 2007.

Greenwood operates two basketball tournaments annually over the winter break. The Blue & Gold tournament for boys was founded in 1947 and is played at Great Southern Bank Arena (winners' brackets) and Hammonds Student Center (consolation brackets) on the MSU campus. Its counterpart, the Pink & White Lady Classic, was added when girls' basketball was recognized at the state level in the 1970s and is held at Drury University, with winners' bracket games in the O'Reilly Family Event Center. 32 of the top high school basketball teams from all across southwestern Missouri take part in each tournament, which draw thousands of fans and are regarded as a holiday season tradition in the Ozarks.

=== Boys soccer ===
Soccer has been Greenwood's most notable sport since its inception in 1990 when it began as a club team. In the 1990s, boys soccer was coached by former Missouri State Bears player Jan Stahle, himself a Greenwood alum. From 1992 to 1999 Greenwood boys soccer fielded a team in the District Championship Game with 7 consecutive District Championships from 1992 to 1998. In 1992 and 1998 the team made it to the state quarterfinals. From 1993 to 1997, Greenwood boys soccer made it to the State Championship round, placing 4th in 1993, 3rd in 1994, and 2nd in 1995–1997. During the 1996 season, Greenwood boys soccer had a national record of 23 consecutive shutouts. In 2005, Greenwood boys soccer returned to its old form posting a 15-9-4 record, a District Championship, and a 3rd place finish in the State Championship round.

== Notable alumni ==
- Joe Haymes, American jazz bandleader and arranger
- Billy Long, 7th District Congressman from Missouri, auctioneer and politician
- Payne Stewart, professional golfer, competed on the school's football, basketball and golf teams.
- Aminu Mohammed, Professional basketball player for the Delaware Blue Coats of the NBA G League
