= 2013–14 Euroleague Qualifying rounds =

The 2013–14 Euroleague Qualifying rounds were played from October 1, 2013, until October 4, 2013. Eight teams participated in a knock-out tournament format to conquer a spot in the 2013–14 Euroleague. Lietuvos rytas advanced as the winner of the qualifying rounds to the Euroleague Regular Season. All games were played in the Siemens Arena in Vilnius.

== Teams ==
The eight teams are:

- (Turkey) Banvit ^{B} (2)
- (Lithuania) Lietuvos Rytas ^{B} (2)
- (Germany) EWE Baskets Oldenburg ^{B} (2)
- (Belgium) Telenet Oostende ^{B} (1)
- (Czech Republic) ČEZ Nymburk ^{B} (1)
- (Latvia) VEF Rīga ^{B} (1)
- (Russia) Khimki ^{WC} (3)
- (Italy) Cimberio Varese ^{WC} (3)

== Draw ==
The draw for the 2013–14 Turkish Airlines Euroleague qualifying rounds was held on Thursday, 4 July. Teams were seeded into four pots of two teams in accordance with the Club Ranking, based on their performance in European competitions during a three-year period, and the teams granted a Wild Card by ECA were seeded above the rest of the teams.

Pot 1	Pot 2	Pot 3	Pot 4
(Russia) Khimki (Italy) Cimberio Varèse	(Lithuania) Lietuvos Rytas (Czech Republic) ČEZ Nymburk	(Turkey) Banvit (Latvia) VEF Rīga	(Belgium) Telenet Oostende (Germany) Oldenburg

== Bracket ==
Qualifying Round 1
1	(Italy) Cimberio Varese	74
4	(Germany) EWE Baskets Oldenburg	79
2	(Lithuania) Lietuvos Rytas	80
3	(Latvia) VEF Rīga	71
2	(Czech Republic) ČEZ Nymburk	78
3	(Turkey) Banvit	87
1	(Russia) Khimki	79
4	(Belgium) Telenet Oostende	90

Qualifying Round 2
4	(Germany) EWE Baskets Oldenburg	87
2	(Lithuania) Lietuvos Rytas	99
3	(Turkey) Banvit	80
4	(Belgium) Telenet Oostende	82

Qualifying Round 3
2	(Lithuania) Lietuvos Rytas	75
4	(Belgium) Telenet Oostende	66

== First qualifying round ==
1 October 2013
18:00

Report

Cimberio Varese (Italy)	74–79	(Germany) EWE Baskets Oldenburg
Scoring by quarter: 17–23, 18–8, 16–21, 23–27
Pts: Polonara 18; Rebs: Šćekić 8 Asts: Clark 3		Pts: Jenkins 18; Rebs: Crosariol 8 Asts: Kramer, Joyce 5

Siemens Arena, Vilnius
Attendance: 1,100
Referees: Sasa Pukl (SLO), Luis Lopes (POR), Sergiy Zashchuk (UKR)

1 October 2013
20:30

Report

Lietuvos Rytas (Lithuania)	80–71	(Latvia) VEF Rīga
Scoring by quarter: 14–15, 25–16, 22–16, 19–24
Pts: Seibutis 23; Rebs: Gecevicius, Palacios 8 Asts: Cook 7		Pts: Delininkaitis 14; Rebs: Berzins, Robinson 5 Asts: Brown 7

Siemens Arena, Vilnius
Attendance: 5,150
Referees: Milivoje Jovcic (SRB), Srdan Dozai (CRO), Marcin Kowalski (POL)

2 October 2013
18:00

Report

Khimki (Russia)	79–90	(Belgium) Telenet Oostende
Scoring by quarter: 18–20, 22–19, 19–21, 20–30
Pts: Davis 32; Rebs: Augustine 8 Asts: Green 7		Pts: Thompson 19; Rebs: Berggren 11; Asts: Djordjević 8

Siemens Arena, Vilnius
Attendance: 550
Referees: Sasa Pukl (SLO), Marcin Kowalski (POL), Apostolos Kalpakas (SWE)

2 October 2013
20:30

Report

ČEZ Nymburk (Czech Republic)	78–87	(Turkey) Banvit
Scoring by quarter: 24–26, 16–26, 18–18, 20–17
Pts: Simmons 27; Rebs: Simmons 6 Asts: Simmons 7		Pts: Simmons 16; Rebs: Mejia 5 Asts: Rowland 13

Siemens Arena, Vilnius
Attendance: 750
Referees: Srdan Dozai (CRO), Milivoje Jovcic (SRB), Petros Papapetrou (GRE)

== Second qualifying round ==
3 October 2013
18:00

Report

EWE Baskets Oldenburg (Germany)	87–99	(Lithuania) Lietuvos Rytas
Scoring by quarter: 20–23, 26–30, 19–18, 22–28
Pts: Kramer 24; Rebs: Freese 5 Asts: Joyce 7		Pts: Gecevičius 34; Rebs: Palacios 5 Asts: Tepić 6

Siemens Arena, Vilnius
Attendance: 5,300
Referees: Luis Lopes (POR), Apostolos Kalpakas (SWE), Petros Papapetrou (GRE)

3 October 2013
20:30

Report

Banvit (Turkey)	80–82	(Belgium) Telenet Oostende
Scoring by quarter: 21–21, 21–19, 23–23, 15–19
Pts: Mejia 26; Rebs: Mejia 11; Asts: Mejia 4		Pts: Thompson 19; Rebs: Stipanović 9 Asts: Marnegraeve 5

Siemens Arena, Vilnius
Attendance: 1,180
Referees: Srdan Dozai (CRO), Marcin Kowalski (POL), Sergiy Zashchuk (UKR)

== Third qualifying round ==
4 October 2013
20:30

Report

Lietuvos Rytas (Lithuania)	75–66	(Belgium) Telenet Oostende
Scoring by quarter: 12–22, 29–21, 24–13, 10–10
Pts: Gecevičius 19; Rebs: Palacios 13; Asts: Cook 5		Pts: Gillet 16; Rebs: Gillet 10; Asts: Djordjević 7

Siemens Arena, Vilnius
Attendance: 6,850
Referees: Sasa Pukl (SLO), Milivoje Jovcic (SRB), Luis Lopes (POR0
