= Matt Rogers =

Matthew or Matt Rogers may refer to

- Matthew Rogers, American singer and TV host
- Matthew Rogers (Australian rules footballer)
- Matthew Rogers (basketball)
- Matt Rogers (comedian)
- Matt Rogers (American football)
- Mat Rogers, rugby player

== Fictional characters ==
- Matthew Rogers, in the ninth season of Little House on the Prairie

== See also ==
- Matt Rodgers, American football player
