= Carmel Christian School, Bristol =

Coordinates: 51.4305°N 2.5404°W

Carmel Christian School
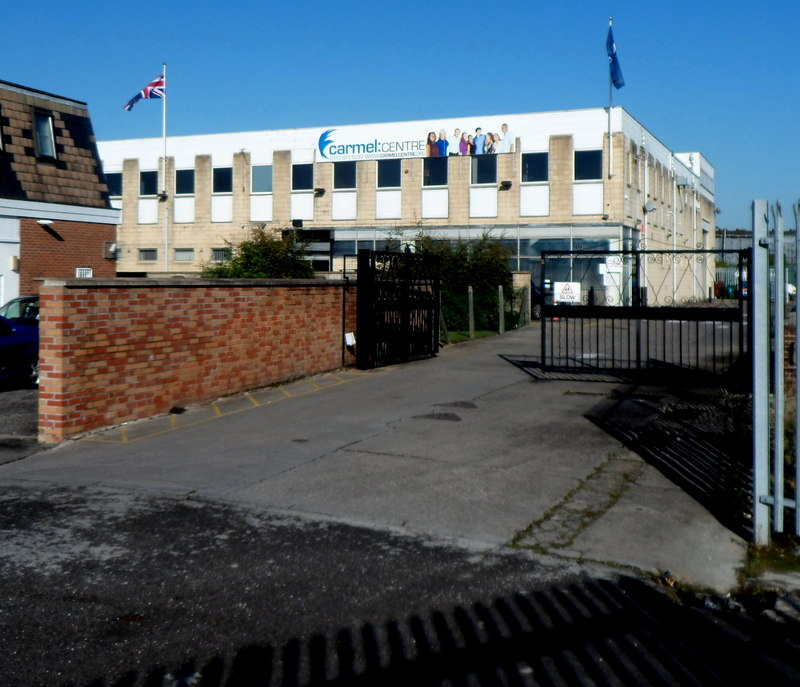

Location
- Bath Road; Bristol, BS4 5NL; England

Information
- Type: Other independent school
- Religious affiliation: Christian
- Established: 2000
- Department for Education URN: 132774 Tables
- Ofsted: Reports
- Head teacher: Joanne Collins
- Gender: Mixed
- Age: 3 to 5
- Capacity: 26
- Website: https://www.carmelchristianschool.org/

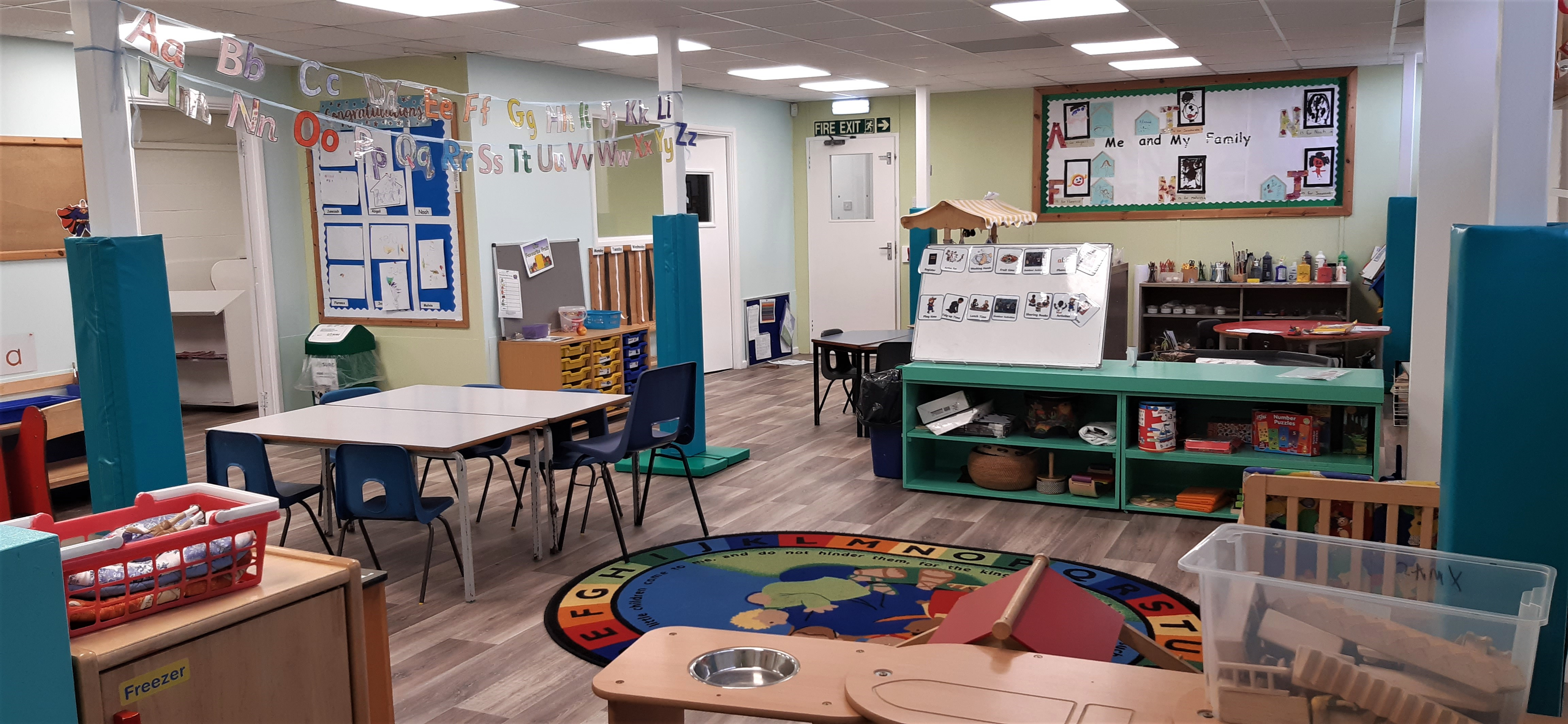
Early Year's Classroom

Carmel Christian School (CCS) was an independent Early Year's provider in Brislington, Bristol, England. Founded in 1997, the school originally provided all-through education, then in late 2020 became a facility solely for nursery and reception children.

The setting openly promoted a Christian ethos and worldview while delivering the Early Years Foundation Stage (EYFS) curriculum. Staff regularly evaluated their practice through The Bristol Standard.

In July 2022, the proprietor and charity trustees closed the setting.
