= Rigas Ekselences Juniori =

Latvian basketball club

- Leagues: Latvian Basketball League; Latvian-Estonian Basketball League
- Founded: 2026
- Arena: Komandu Sporta Spēļu Halle (Team Sports Games Hall)
- Capacity: 3000
- Location: Riga, Latvia
- Team colors: Blue and White
- Head coach: Valdis Razumovskis
Home	Away

The Rigas Ekselences Juniori team plays in the Latvian Basketball League and Latvian-Estonian Basketball League.

== History ==
Rīgas Ekselences Juniori is an under-18 boys' basketball team formed in the 2026–2027 season as part of the Riga Basketball Excellence Development Programme, a joint initiative of the Riga City Council, Riga Basketball School and the Latvian Basketball Union. The team was created to bring together players from Latvia's U-18 national team selection, allowing the core of the national squad to train and compete together at club level. Its head coach is Valdis Razumovskis, while Dairis Bertāns serves as the programme's sports director.

== Players ==
=== Current roster ===
Note: Flags indicate national team eligibility at FIBA-sanctioned events. Players may hold other non-FIBA nationalities not displayed.

Rigas Ekselences Juniori 2026–27 roster
Players
Coaches

Pos.	No.	Nat.	Name	Ht.	Wt.	Age
SG	1	(Latvia)	Rolands Teikmanis	1.84 m (6 ft 0 in)	82 kg (181 lb)	15 – 7 February 2011
PF	5	(Latvia)	Ričards Zariņš	1.95 m (6 ft 5 in)	105 kg (231 lb)	19 – 5 April 2007
PG	9	(Latvia)	Raivo Kudrjavcevs	1.94 m (6 ft 4 in)	76 kg (168 lb)	18 – 15 July 2008
PF	11	(Latvia)	Markuss Tēbelis	2.04 m (6 ft 8 in)	92 kg (203 lb)	18 – 2 March 2008
C	12	(Latvia)	Roberts Valdis Bērziņš	2.14 m (7 ft 0 in)	104 kg (229 lb)	17 – 5 August 2009
SG	19	(Latvia)	Eduards Ābele	1.87 m (6 ft 2 in)	86 kg (190 lb)	19 – 1 June 2007
C	31	(Latvia)	Edgars Lieķis	2.06 m (6 ft 9 in)	99 kg (218 lb)	18 – 18 February 2008
PG	42	(Latvia)	Ernests Vēzītis	1.84 m (6 ft 0 in)	65 kg (143 lb)	17 – 25 January 2009
PG	43	(Latvia)	Raivo Indāns	1.86 m (6 ft 1 in)	74 kg (163 lb)	17 – 13 July 2009
SF	51	(Latvia)	Renārs Jasāns	1.97 m (6 ft 6 in)	92 kg (203 lb)	19 – 27 January 2007
SF	55	(Latvia)	Markuss Svīķis	1.93 m (6 ft 4 in)	87 kg (192 lb)	18 – 5 July 2008
SG	77	(Latvia)	Helmuts Petrovičs (C)	1.97 m (6 ft 6 in)	83 kg (183 lb)	19 – 21 September 2007

Head coach

- (Latvia) Valdis Razumovskis

Assistant coach(es)

- (Latvia) Artūrs Strēlnieks

Legend

- (C) Team captain
- Injured

- Roster
Updated: October 27, 2026

=== Depth chart ===
Pos.	Starting 5	Bench 1	Bench 2	Bench 3
C	Roberts Valdis Bērziņš	Edgars Lieķis	Markuss Kovals
PF	Markuss Tēbelis	Rinalds Timma	Ričards Zariņš
SF	Markuss Svīķis	Renārs Jasāns	Juris Sičkars	Ralfs Rudzinskis
SG	Helmuts Petrovičs	Eduards Ābele	Rolands Teikmanis	Rauls Mass
PG	Raivo Kudrjavcevs	Raivo Indāns	Ernests Vēzītis

== Coaches ==
- (Latvia) Valdis Razumovskis: 2026–present
