= Cēzars Ozers =

Soviet and Latvian basketball player (1937–2023)

Personal information
- Born: 11 February 1937 Riga, Latvia
- Died: 5 November 2023 (aged 86)
- Listed height: 1.81 m (5 ft 11 in)
- Listed weight: 81 kg (179 lb)
- Position: Point guard
Medals
Men's basketball
Representing Soviet Union
Olympic Games
Silver medal – second place	1960 Rome	Men's basketball

Cēzars Ozers (11 February 1937 – 5 November 2023), also known as Tsezar Eduardovich Ozers (Russian: Цезар Эдуардович Озерс), was a Soviet and Latvian basketball player. He played as a point guard. Ozers won a silver medal at the 1960 Summer Olympics. He died on 5 November 2023, at the age of 86.
