= Valmiera Glass Via (basketball) =

Latvian basketball club

Valmiera Glass ViA
- Leagues: Latvian Basketball League; Latvian–Estonian Basketball League; Europe Cup
- Founded: 2011
- Arena: Valmiera Olympic Center
- Capacity: 1500
- Location: Valmiera, Latvia
- Team colors: Black, Green, White
- Team manager: Roberts Zeile
- Head coach: Dāvis Čoders
- Championships: 1 LBL; 1 Latvian Basketball Cup; 1 LatEst Championship
- Website: www.vgvia.lv
Home	Away

Valmiera Glass Vidzemes Augstskola (Valmiera Glass ViA, official "VALMIERA GLASS VIA") is a basketball club based in Valmiera, Latvia, playing in the Latvian–Estonian Basketball League. Originally a student club of Vidzeme University of Applied Sciences (Vidzemes Augstskola), Valmiera started playing in the Latvian Basketball League's third division in 2011, and expanded its roster to include semi-professional and fully professional players. In 2018, the team was promoted to the Latvian–Estonian Basketball League, the newly formed combined top basketball division of Latvia and Estonia, after bankruptcy of the former Latvian champion club Valmiera/Ordo. From 2021, the club also participates in the European North Basketball League, until 2026, when changed to FIBA Europe Cup.

== History ==
The club was founded in 2009 as the student team of Vidzeme University. It debuted in 2011 in the Latvian Basketball League's Third Division (LBL3) as Vidzemes Augstskola. With Roberts Zeile as player coach and Sandis Amoliņš in roster, the team won the division championship in spring of 2012 and was promoted to the Second Division (LBL2). In 2012, Oto Grīnbergs joined the team and became focal point in team's offence, managing to be leading scorer for next five seasons.

In 2014, the team began a partnership with Valmiera Fibreglass and played as "Vidzemes Augstskola/Valmiera Glass". It had also established a farm team "Vidzemes Augstskola/Valmiera Glass-2" which played in LBL's third division. In 2016, the football club Valmieras FK and the basketball club were brought together under the organization name "SO Valmiera Glass / Vidzemes Augstskola" or "Valmiera Glass ViA".

Gradually, the club rose in second division rankings, and made a finals appearance in 2017, where they lost to BK Jelgava. That sparked discussion of Valmiera Glass ViA joining the Latvian Basketball League's highest division. In 2018 Valmiera Glass ViA lost the second division bronze medal series to BK Gulbenes Buki, finishing in fourth place, but due to the bankruptcy of Valmiera city rival club Valmiera/Ordo Valmiera Glass ViA was promoted to newly founded Latvian–Estonian Basketball League.

Before the 2018/2019 season, professional Valmiera basketball players Jānis Kaufmanis, Edmunds Elksnis and Māris Ziediņš joined Valmiera Glass ViA. In the regular season, the team's record was 8-20, finishing 12th place overall and 6th among Latvian teams. Although it missed the Latvian-Estonian playoffs, the team qualified for the Latvian LBL playoffs and played in the quarterfinal series against BK Ogre, where they lost the series 0-3.

In the summer of 2022, club announced that prominent Latvian national team players and brothers Dairis Bertāns and Dāvis Bertāns have become members of the club board. The club has a strong bond with Bertāns' Basketball School in Valmiera.

The 2025–26 season was one of the most successful in the club's history. The team was led for his first full season as head coach by Kaspars Vecvagars, for whom it was a debut campaign in the head-coaching role. During the season, Valmiera Glass ViA won three trophies. In February the team claimed the Latvian Basketball Cup, defeating BK Ventspils 84–70 in the final in Ventspils. The final's most valuable player was the club's Lithuanian point guard Dominykas Stenionis, who scored 15 points, made six assists and recorded one steal. In April, Valmiera became champions of the Latvian–Estonian Basketball League for the first time in its history, beating hosts Tartu Ülikool/Maks & Moorits 100–95 in the final in Tartu. Aniwaniwa Tait-Jones was named the most valuable player of the final. In May the club also won the Latvian Basketball League title for the first time. In the best-of-five final series, Valmiera defeated BK Ventspils 3–1, winning the decisive fourth game 92–89 on the road. This was the first time in the LBL's 35-year history that the gold-medal series took place without the participation of a Riga club. Aniwaniwa Tait-Jones was crowned MVP of the final series, capping a season in which Valmiera won all three available domestic titles.

== Roster ==
=== Current roster ===
Valmiera Glass ViA 2026-27 roster
Players
Coaches

Pos.	No.	Nat.	Name	Ht.	Wt.	Age
SG	0	(United States)	Bryce McBride	1.88 m (6 ft 2 in)	81 kg (179 lb)	26 – 1 April 2000
PG	1	(United States)	Darren Williams	1.75 m (5 ft 9 in)	65 kg (143 lb)	26 – 15 July 2000
SG	2	(Latvia)	Krists Kristers Ozers	1.94 m (6 ft 4 in)	83 kg (183 lb)	18 – 9 January 2008
SG	3	(United States)	Jake Heidbreder	1.95 m (6 ft 5 in)	84 kg (185 lb)	23 – 3 May 2003
C	4	(Ukraine)	Pavlo Dziuba	2.03 m (6 ft 8 in)	106 kg (234 lb)	23 – 3 July 2003
PG	6	(Latvia)	Mārcis Vītols	1.85 m (6 ft 1 in)	87 kg (192 lb)	34 – 2 May 1992
C	7	(Canada)	Prince Oduro	2.03 m (6 ft 8 in)	116 kg (256 lb)	28 – 27 October 1998
SF	9	(Latvia)	Artis Ate (C)	1.95 m (6 ft 5 in)	86 kg (190 lb)	37 – 29 July 1989
SG	10	(Latvia)	Markuss Toms	1.98 m (6 ft 6 in)	86 kg (190 lb)	18 – 19 December 2007
PF	12	(Latvia)	Verners Kohs	2.03 m (6 ft 8 in)	93 kg (205 lb)	29 – 21 May 1997
PG	13	(Latvia)	Ralfs Mūrnieks	1.85 m (6 ft 1 in)	75 kg (165 lb)	18 – 4 September 2008
F	21	(United States)	Ian Scott	2.01 m (6 ft 7 in)	100 kg (220 lb)	24 – 6 September 2002
SF	23	(Latvia)	Dāvis Ozers	1.93 m (6 ft 4 in)	97 kg (214 lb)	22 – 28 March 2004
SF	24	(Nigeria)	Aminu Mohammed	1.96 m (6 ft 5 in)	99 kg (218 lb)	24 – 15 December 2001
PF	26	(Latvia)	Ričards Čerņevskis	1.98 m (6 ft 6 in)	100 kg (220 lb)	18 – 11 April 2008

Head coach

- (Latvia) Dāvis Čoders

Assistant coach(es)

- (Latvia) Normunds Lišiks
- (Latvia) Edmunds Elksnis

Legend

- (C) Team captain
- Injured

- Roster
Updated: October 31, 2026

=== Depth chart ===
Pos.	Starting 5	Bench 1	Reserve	Bench 3
C	Prince Oduro	Pavlo Dziuba
PF	Verners Kohs	Rihards Čerņevskis	Ian Scott
SF	Aminu Mohammed	Artis Ate	Dāvis Ozers
SG	Jake Heidbreder	Bryce McBride	Markuss Toms	Krists Kristers Ozers
PG	Darren Williams	Marcis Vītols	Ralfs Mūrnieks

=== Squad changes for the 2026–27 season ===
==== In ====
Note: Flags indicate national team, as has been defined under FIBA eligibility rules. Players may hold more than one non-FIBA nationality.

No.	Pos.	Nat.	Player
3	SG	(United States) USA	Jake Heidbreder (from (NCAA) Fresno State Bulldogs)
10	SG	(Latvia) LAT	Markuss Toms (from (Latvia) (2) Bertānu Valmieras BS)
0	PG	(United States) USA	Darren Williams (from (Belgium) Kortrijk Spurs)
26	SF	(Latvia) LAT	Rihards Čerņevskis (from (Latvia) (2) Mārupes NSS/LU)
24	SG	(Nigeria) NGR	Aminu Mohammed (from (Tunisia) Club Africain)
0	SG	(United States) USA	Bryce McBride (from (Estonia) Tartu Ülikool Maks & Moorits)
7	C	(Canada) CAN	Prince Oduro (from (Canada) Montreal Alliance)

==== Out ====
Note: Flags indicate national team, as has been defined under FIBA eligibility rules. Players may hold more than one non-FIBA nationality.

No.	Pos.	Nat.	Player
29	C	(Bosnia and Herzegovina) BIH	Omar Pajič (to (Germany) (2) BG Göttingen)
1	SG	(Latvia) LAT	Kristofers Karlsons (to (Latvia) BK Ventspils)
7	C	(United States) USA	Andrew Pacher (to (Uruguay) Urunday Universitario)
3	PG	(Lithuania) LTU	Dominykas Stenionis (to (Spain) Bàsquet Girona)
34	PF	(Latvia) LAT	Jānis Mārtiņš Kalniņš (to (Latvia) Rīgas Ekselences Juniori)
5	SF	(New Zealand) NZL	Aniwaniwa Tait-Jones (free agent)
2	SG	(Latvia) LAT	Markuss Sipko (free agent)

* Left/joined the team during the season

=== Historical rosters ===
2025/2026 season roster
Pos.	Starting 5	Bench 1	Bench 2	Left team during season
C	(Bosnia and Herzegovina) #29 Omar Pajič	(United States) #7 Andrew Pacher	(Ukraine) #4 Pavlo Dziuba	(Latvia) #88 Rinalds Mālmanis
PF	(Latvia) #12 Verners Kohs	(Latvia) #34 Jānis Mārtiņš Kalniņš		
SF	(New Zealand) #5 Aniwaniwa Tait-Jones	(Latvia) #23 Dāvis Ozers		(United States) #0 Curtis Hollis
SG	(Latvia) #9 Artis Ate C	(Latvia) #1 Kristofers Karlsons	(Latvia) #24 Krists Kristers Ozers	
PG	(Lithuania) #3 Dominykas Stenionis	(Latvia) #6 Mārcis Vītols	(Latvia) #2 Markuss Sipko	

2024/2025 season roster
Pos.	Starting 5	Bench 1	Bench 2
C	(Ukraine) #15 Rostyslav Novitskyi	(United States) #2 Kahliel Spear	
PF	(Latvia) #12 Verners Kohs	(Latvia) #7 Ervīns Jonāns	(United States) #31 Frankie Policelli
SF	(Latvia) #9 Artis Ate	(Latvia) #5 Ričards Liberts	(Latvia) #22 Markuss Sipko
SG	(Latvia) #3 Edmunds Elksnis C	(Latvia) #27 Ojārs Bērziņš	(Latvia) #6 Dāvis Ozers
PG	(United States) #1 Daquan Smith	(Latvia) #0 Kristofers Karlsons	(Nigeria) #4 Michael Abiodun Nuga

=== Retired numbers ===
Retired numbers of Valmiera basketball
No.	Player	Position	Tenure	Ceremony date
8	(Latvia) Dainis Bertāns	C	1992–2004	08/01/2014
11	(Latvia) Sandis Amoliņš	SG	1997–2014	07/03/2020

== Honours ==
- Latvian Basketball Cup:

Champions: 2025-26

- Latvian–Estonian Basketball League:

Champions: 2025-26

== Season by season ==
Season	League	Regular season	Playoffs	Latvian Cup	European competitions			Notes
2011–12	LBL 3	2nd	Champion					promoted to LBL 2
2012–13	LBL 2	8th	QF					
2013–14	LBL 2	8th	lost in play-in series for QF					
2014–15	LBL 2	5th	QF					
2015–16	LBL 2	1st	QF					
2016–17	LBL 2	4th	Runner-up					
2017–18	LBL 2	5th	4th					promoted to LatEstBL
2018–19	LatEstBL	12th overall (6th in Latvian)	DNQ in League Playoff; QF in Latvian Playoff					
2019–20	LatEstBL	11th overall (5th in Latvian)	Did not happen due to COVID-19 pandemic					
2020–21	LatEstBL	11th overall (5th in Latvian)	DNQ in League Playoff; QF in Latvian Playoff					
2021–22	LatEstBL	10th overall (4th in Latvian)	DNQ in League Playoff; QF in Latvian Playoffs		European North Basketball League	RS	0-5	
2022–23	LatEstBL	15th overall (6th in Latvian)	DNQ in League Playoff; QF in Latvian Playoffs		European North Basketball League	RS	0-7	
2023–24	LatEstBL	13th overall (6th in Latvian)	DNQ in League Playoff; QF in Latvian Playoffs	Quarter-finals	European North Basketball League	RS	0-7	
2024–25	LatEstBL	5th overall (4th in Latvian)	QF in League Playoff; SF in Latvian Playoffs	Quarter-finals	European North Basketball League	QF	6-4	
2025–26	LatEstBL	1st overall (TBD in Latvian)	Champions in League Playoff; TBD	Champions	European North Basketball League	R16	5-4	

== Notable players ==
- (Latvia) Sandis Amoliņš
- (Latvia) Jānis Kaufmanis
- (Latvia) Edmunds Elksnis
- (Latvia) Māris Ziediņš
- (Latvia) Viktors Iļjins

== See also ==
- Valmieras FK, the related football club with the same logo
- BK Valmiera, previous Valmiera basketball team
