= Mārtiņš Gulbis =

Latvian basketball player and coach

BG Göttingen
- Title: Head coach
- League: ProA

Personal information
- Born: 28 April 1991 (age 35) Rīga, Latvia
- Listed height: 6 ft 5.5 in (1.97 m)
- Listed weight: 176 lb (80 kg)

Career information
- Playing career: 2008–2011
- Position: Point guard
- Coaching career: 2011–present

Career history

Playing
- 2008–2011: VEF Rīga

Coaching
- 2011–2013: Barons
- 2013–2014: Barons (assistant)
- 2014–2016: BK Jelgava
- 2016–2017: Barons
- 2017–2020: BK Jūrmala
- 2019–2021: Latvia (women)
- 2020–2024: TTT Rīga
- 2023–2025: Latvia (women)
- 2024–2026: VEF Rīga
- 2026–present: BG Göttingen
- 2026–present: Latvia (assistant)

Career highlights
- Latvian league champion (2011); 4x Latvian league champion (2021–2024); 4x WBBL champion (2021–2024); Latvian-Estonian League champion (2025); LBL champion (2025)

Mārtiņš Gulbis (born 28 April 1991) is a Latvian former professional basketball player and a current coach. He is the head coach of BG Göttingen and assistant of Latvia men's national basketball team.

Standing at 6 ft 5.5 in (1.97 m), he played at the point guard position While player, he was in the VEF Rīga roster when the now 10-time Latvian champs got its first title in 2011. At the age of 20 he but put the end to his player career because of the health reasons and became the youngest head coach in Latvian Basketball League history.

== Coaching career ==
In his debut season as a head coach Gulbis led Barons to Latvian league 2nd division title. In 2017, he led Barons to bronze medal in Latvian league and repeated it in 2018 at the helm of BK Jūrmala. With Jūrmala Gulbis also went to the Baltic Basketball League final in 2018.

In 2020 Gulbis switched his career to women's club basketball when he was appointed the head coach of the legendary Latvian team TTT Rīga. In 2022 Gulbis led TTT to Euroleague Top8 finish. In 2024 TTT played in the EuroCup quarter-finals.

Gulbis has been assistant and head coach of Latvian youth national teams in FIBA European championships. In 2019 he was appointed the head coach of Latvia women's national basketball team and led it for two years. He returned to the position in 2023.

On June 3, 2024 Gulbis made a comeback to men's basketball, becoming the head coach of Latvian champs VEF Rīga.

Following an unsuccessful 2025–26 season, in which VEF failed to win a medal in the Latvian Basketball League (LBL) for the first time since 2009, while also falling short of winning the Latvian Cup and the Latvian–Estonian Basketball League, Gulbis' contract was terminated.

== Personal life ==
Mārtiņš has an older brother Māris Gulbis with whom he played in VEF Rīga and later coached him while in Barons.
