= Ramūnas Butautas =

Lithuanian basketball coach (born 1964)

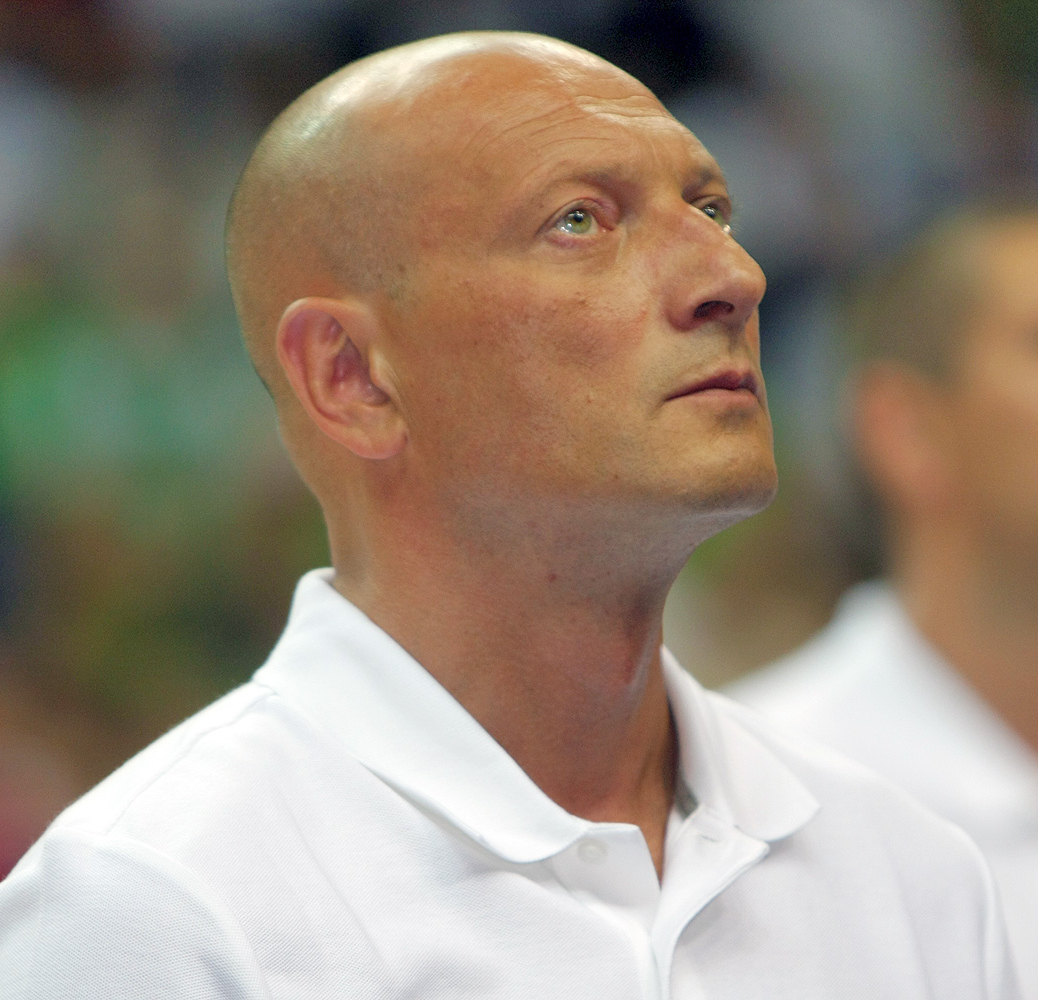
- Butautas in 2015

Personal information
- Born: May 22, 1964 (age 62) Kaunas, Lithuania
- Position: Head coach
- Coaching career: 2003–2018

Career history

Coaching
- 2003–2005: Šiauliai
- 2005–2008: ASK Riga
- 2007–2009: Lithuania
- 2009: Donetsk
- 2009–2010: Žalgiris Kaunas
- 2010–2014: VEF Rīga
- 2015–2016: Astana
- 2017–2018: Lietkabelis Panevėžys
- 2017–2018: Lebanon

Career highlights
- 4× Latvian League champion (2007, 2011–2013); Kazakh League champion (2015)
Medals
Men's basketball
Head coach for Lithuania
FIBA European Championship
Bronze medal – third place	2007 Spain	National Team
FIBA Europe Under-20 Championship
Bronze medal – third place	2004 Czech Republic	National Team

Ramūnas Butautas (born 22 May 1964 in Kaunas) is a Lithuanian professional basketball coach who last coached Lietkabelis Panevėžys of the Lithuanian Basketball League. He is the son of Stepas Butautas. In 2017, Butautas was elected as the head coach for Lebanon national basketball team.

== Career ==
On December 28, 2006, the executive committee of Basketball Federation of Lithuania unanimously decided that Butautas would become the head coach of the Lithuanian national men's basketball team. In December 2009, he was appointed as the head coach of Žalgiris Kaunas. On February 9, 2010, Butautas was released from Žalgiris. On March 16, 2011, Butautas was appointed head coach of VEF Rīga. In June 2013 he signed a three-year extension with VEF Rīga, but following a disappointing season was relieved of his duties in June 2014. He also coached Astana, winning the national championship in 2015. He left the team after a disappointing season in 2016. On December 29, 2017, he became the head coach of Lietkabelis Panevėžys of the Lithuanian Basketball League.

== National level ==
- 2003: Lithuania U-19 second coach
- 2004: Lithuania U-20 head coach
- 2005: Lithuania U-21 head coach
- 2007–2009: Lithuania national basketball team head coach
- 2017: Lithuania U-20 head coach
- 2017–2018: Lebanon national basketball team head coach

== Achievements ==
- Silver in 2003 FIBA Under-19 World Championship
- Bronze 2004 FIBA Europe Under-20 Championship
- Gold in 2005 FIBA Under-21 World Championship
- LKL bronze medalist – 2004, 2005
- BBL bronze medalist – 2005, 2008, 2012
- BBL silver medalist – 2011
- Latvian league bronze medalist – 2006
- Latvian league champion – 2007, 2011, 2012, 2013
- Bronze in EuroBasket 2007
- Latvian league silver medalist – 2008, 2014
- Kazakhstan Basketball Championship champion – 2015
