= Stepas Butautas =

Soviet and Lithuanian professional basketball player and coach

Personal information
- Born: 25 August 1925 Kaunas, Lithuania
- Died: 22 March 2001 (aged 75) Kaunas, Lithuania

Career information
- Playing career: 1944–1956
- Number: 4, 5, 14
- Coaching career: 1958–1979

Career history

Playing
- 1944: Dinamo Kaunas
- 1945: ASK Kaunas
- 1946: Dinamo Kaunas
- 1947–1956: Žalgiris Kaunas

Coaching
- 1955–1956: Lithuania women
- 1958–1964: Soviet Union women
- 1960–1966: Politechnika Kaunas women
- 1967–1968, 1970: Cuba
- 1975–1978, 1979: Žalgiris Kaunas

Career highlights
- As a player: FIBA's 50 Greatest Players (1991); 2× Soviet League champion (1947, 1951); 6× Lithuanian SSR League champion (1945, 1950, 1952–1955)
Medals
Men's basketball
Representing Soviet Union
Summer Olympic Games
Silver medal – second place	1952 Helsinki
EuroBasket
Gold medal – first place	1947 Czechoslovakia
Gold medal – first place	1951 France
Gold medal – first place	1953 USSR
Head Coach Soviet Union
FIBA Women's World Cup
Gold medal – first place	1959 Soviet Union
Gold medal – first place	1964 Peru
EuroBasket Women
Silver medal – second place	1958 Poland
Gold medal – first place	1960 Bulgaria
Gold medal – first place	1962 France
Gold medal – first place	1964 Hungary
Head Coach Cuba
CentroBasket
Silver medal – second place	1967 El Salvador

Stepas Butautas (alternate spellings: Stiepas, Butaustas) (25 August 1925 – 22 March 2001 in Kaunas) was a Soviet and Lithuanian professional basketball player and coach. He trained at the VSS Žalgiris, in Kaunas. He played with the Soviet Union men's national basketball team at the 1952 Summer Olympic Games, where he won a silver medal. During the tournament, he played in all eight games.

He was named one of FIBA's 50 Greatest Players in 1991.

== Club career ==
Butautas started his career with Dinamo Kaunas in 1944. He then played with ASK Kaunas in 1945, before returning to Dinamo Kaunas in 1946. He played with Žalgiris Kaunas, from 1947 to 1956.

With Zalgiris, he won the USSR Premier Basketball League championship in 1947 and 1951. He also won 6 Lithuanian SSR championships (1945, 1950, 1952, 1953, 1954, 1955).

== National team career ==
Butautas was a member of the Soviet Union men's national basketball team, from 1947 to 1954. With the Soviet Union, he won gold medals at the EuroBasket 1947, the EuroBasket 1951, and the EuroBasket 1953. He also won a silver medal at the 1952 Summer Olympic Games.

== Coaching career ==
=== Clubs ===
After he retired from playing basketball, Butautas began a career working as a basketball coach. On the club level, he was the head coach of Politechnika Kaunas women's team, from 1960 to 1966. He was then the head coach of Žalgiris Kaunas, from 1975 to 1979.

=== Soviet Union women's national team ===
Butautas was the head coach of the Soviet Union women's national basketball team, from 1958 to 1964. He led them to gold medals at the 1959 FIBA World Championship for Women, and the 1964 FIBA World Championship for Women. He also won gold medals at the EuroBasket Women 1960, the EuroBasket Women 1962, and the EuroBasket Women 1964. He also won the silver medal at the EuroBasket Women 1958.

=== Cuba national team ===
Butautas was also the head coach of the Cuba men's national basketball team, from 1967 to 1968, and in 1970. He coached Cuba at the 1967 CentroBasket, the 1968 Summer Olympic Games, and at the 1970 FIBA World Championship.

== Managerial career ==
Butautas was the department head of the Lithuanian State Institute of Physical Education (now Lithuanian Sports University), from 1978 to 1985. He was the President of the Lithuanian SSR Basketball Federation, from 1959 to 1961. He was also the Chairman of the Lithuanian SSR Basketball Coaches Commission, from 1980 to 1989.

== State awards ==
- Lithuania: Recipient of the Knight's Cross of the Order of the Lithuanian Grand Duke Gediminas (1994)

== Personal life ==
His son, Ramūnas Butautas, was the head coach of the Lithuania men's national basketball team.

== See also ==
- List of EuroBasket Women winning head coaches
