= Mount Carmel Christian School =

Coordinates: 40.0987°N 79.5554°W

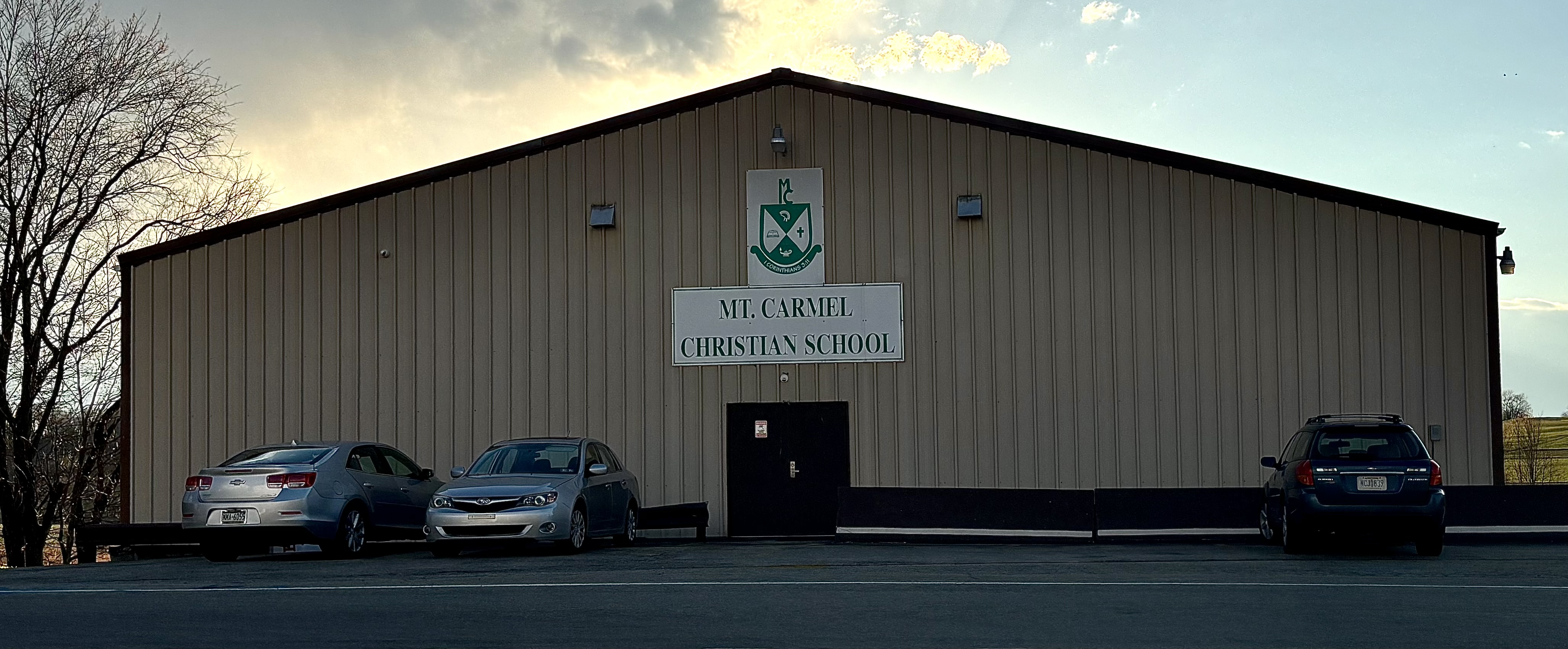
- Mount Carmel Christian School in 2026

Location
- 1231 Mount Pleasant Road; Mount Pleasant, Pennsylvania 15666; United States

Information
- Motto: Excellence in Christian Education since 1974
- Religious affiliation: Christian
- Founded: 1974
- Founder: William Hoffman
- NCES School ID: 01907196
- Principal: Sherwood Edwards
- Teaching staff: 7.0 (on an FTE basis)
- Grades: K-12
- Enrollment: 74 (2021-22)
- Student to teacher ratio: 10.6
- Colors: Green & White
- Athletics conference: FCAA
- Nickname: Cougars
- Newspaper: Cougar Courier
- Yearbook: Reflections
- Website: www.mymccs.org

Mount Carmel Christian School is a private Christian school located in Pennsylvania, United States with 67 Students in grades K-12.

== History ==
The school was founded in 1974, and started with 27 students that year. Reasons provided for founding the school were teaching religion, the provision of corporal punishment, and avoiding sex education. Bible classes were taught the first hour each day, and bible lessons were incorporated into all lessons.

Enrollment in 1974 was 26. Classes were held in Mount Carmel Community Church in Prittstown, in four rooms created by remodeling the churches original auditorium.

== Demographics ==
Student Demographics
White	90%
Hispanic	6%
Black	3%
Asian/Pacific Islander	1%
Native American, Multiracial, Native Hawaiian, & Pacific Islander	<1%

== Athletics ==
The sports teams are nicknamed the Cougars. Mount Carmel has the following athletic offerings at the school:

Boys	Girls
Soccer, Basketball, Track	Basketball, Volleyball, Track
