= Carlos Frade =

Spanish basketball manager

ALBA Berlin
- Position: Assistant coach
- League: Basketball Bundesliga

Personal information
- Born: October 11, 1974 (age 52) Madrid, Spain
- Coaching career: 1995–present

Career history

Coaching
- 1995–1996: University of Guelph
- 1996–1997: CB Iregua
- 1998: Hong Kong national team
- 1999: CB Olesa
- 1999–2000: Leicester Riders
- 2000–2001: GTTP
- 2001–2003: CB Clavijo
- 2003–2005: Pamesa Valencia (assistant)
- 2005–2009: CB Gran Canaria (assistant)
- 2010–2012: UB La Palma
- 2012–2013: Cáceres Ciudad del Baloncesto
- 2013–2015: Alba Fehérvár
- 2015: VEF Rīga
- 2016: Navarra
- 2016–2017: Bilbao Basket (assistant)
- 2017–present: ALBA Berlin (assistant)

Carlos Frade (born October 11, 1974, in Madrid, Spain) is a Spanish basketball manager, who currently is assistant coach at ALBA Berlin of Basketball Bundesliga.

== Coach career ==
After a long career with several international experiences, he made his debut as assistant coach in Liga ACB in 2003, with Valencia. Two years later, he signs for CB Gran Canaria, where he works during five seasons as assistant coach of Pedro Martínez, before signing for LEB Oro team UB La Palma.

On 2013, he leaves Spain for joining Hungarian team Alba Fehérvár.

Two years later, he leaves Alba without winning any title for signing with Latvian VEF Rīga.

On 9 February 2016, Frade comes back to Spain after being appointed as the head coach of Planasa Navarra until the end of the season.
