= Philadelphia 76ers all-time roster =

American basketball players

The following is a list of players, both past and current, who appeared at least in one game for the Philadelphia 76ers NBA franchise.

== Players ==
Note: Statistics are correct through the end of the 2025–26 season.

| G | Guard | G/F | Guard-forward | F | Forward | F/C | Forward-center | C | Center |

legend
| ^ | Denotes player who has been inducted to the Naismith Memorial Basketball Hall of Fame |
| * | Denotes player who has been selected for at least one All-Star Game with the Philadelphia 76ers and is currently on the team roster |
| ^{+} | Denotes player who has been selected for at least one All-Star Game with the Philadelphia 76ers |
| ^{x} | Denotes player who is currently on the Philadelphia 76ers roster |
| 0.0 | Denotes the Philadelphia 76ers statistics leader (min. 100 games played for the team for per-game statistics) |

=== A to B ===
All-time roster
| Player | Pos. | Pre-draft team | Yrs | Seasons | Statistics | | | | | | | | | Ref. |
| Player | Pos. | Pre-draft team | Yrs | Seasons | GP | MP | REB | AST | PTS | MPG | RPG | APG | PPG | Ref. |
|---|---|---|---|---|---|---|---|---|---|---|---|---|---|---|
| Alaa Abdelnaby | F/C | Duke | 1 | 1994–1995 | 3 | 30 | 8 | 0 | 2 | 10.0 | 2.7 | 0.0 | 0.7 | |
| Forest Able | G | Western Kentucky | 1 | 1956–1957 | 1 | 1 | 1 | 1 | 0 | 1.0 | 1.0 | 1.0 | 0.0 | |
| Furkan Aldemir | F/C | (Turkey) Galatasaray Liv Hospital | 1 | 2014–2015 | 41 | 540 | 176 | 28 | 93 | 13.2 | 4.3 | 0.7 | 2.3 | |
| Lavoy Allen | F/C | Temple | 3 | 2011–2014 | 171 | 3,253 | 843 | 172 | 887 | 19.0 | 4.9 | 1.0 | 5.2 | |
| Derrick Alston | F | Duquesne | 2 | 1994–1996 | 137 | 2,646 | 521 | 94 | 751 | 19.3 | 3.8 | 0.7 | 5.5 | |
| Lou Amundson | F/C | UNLV | 2 | 2006–2008 | 26 | 151 | 40 | 1 | 34 | 5.8 | 1.5 | 0.0 | 1.3 | |
| Cliff Anderson | G/F | Saint Joseph's | 1 | 1970–1971 | 5 | 27 | 11 | 4 | 7 | 5.4 | 2.2 | 0.8 | 1.4 | |
| J. J. Anderson | F | Bradley | 1 | 1982–1983 | 13 | 48 | 12 | 1 | 17 | 3.7 | 0.9 | 0.1 | 1.3 | |
| James Anderson | G/F | Oklahoma State | 1 | 2013–2014 | 80 | 2,309 | 300 | 149 | 810 | 28.9 | 3.8 | 1.9 | 10.1 | |
| Justin Anderson | G | Virginia | 2 | 2016–2018 | 62 | 1,037 | 189 | 59 | 439 | 16.7 | 3.0 | 1.0 | 7.1 | |
| Ron Anderson | G/F | Fresno State | 5 | 1988–1993 | 393 | 10,742 | 1,530 | 625 | 5,138 | 27.3 | 3.9 | 1.6 | 13.1 | |
| Michael Ansley | F | Alabama | 1 | 1991–1992 | 8 | 32 | 4 | 2 | 15 | 4.0 | 0.5 | 0.3 | 1.9 | |
| Vincent Askew | G/F | Memphis | 1 | 1987–1988 | 14 | 234 | 22 | 33 | 52 | 16.7 | 1.6 | 2.4 | 3.7 | |
| Isaac Austin | C | Arizona State | 1 | 1993–1994 | 14 | 201 | 69 | 17 | 72 | 14.4 | 4.9 | 1.2 | 5.1 | |
| Dennis Awtrey | C | Santa Clara | 3 | 1970–1973 | 131 | 2,123 | 692 | 142 | 756 | 16.2 | 5.3 | 1.1 | 5.8 | |
| Marcus Bagley | F | Arizona State | 1 | 2024–2025 | 10 | 253 | 70 | 10 | 67 | 25.3 | 7.0 | 1.0 | 6.7 | |
| Patrick Baldwin Jr. | F | Milwaukee | 1 | 2025–2026 | 1 | 2 | 1 | 0 | 0 | 2.0 | 1.0 | 0.0 | 0.0 | |
| Mike Bantom | F/C | Saint Joseph's | 1 | 1981–1982 | 43 | 979 | 226 | 46 | 380 | 22.8 | 5.3 | 1.1 | 8.8 | |
| Charles Barkley^ (#34) | F | Auburn | 8 | 1984–1992 | 610 | 22,761 | 7,079 | 2,276 | 14,184 | 37.3 | 11.6 | 3.7 | 23.3 | |
| Dominick Barlow^{x} | F | Dumont HS (NJ) | 1 | 2025–2026 | 71 | 1,689 | 340 | 87 | 545 | 23.8 | 4.8 | 1.2 | 7.7 | |
| Matt Barnes | F | UCLA | 1 | 2005–2006 | 50 | 538 | 97 | 22 | 149 | 10.8 | 1.9 | 0.4 | 3.0 | |
| Dick Barnett^ | G/F | Tennessee State | 2 | 1959–1961 | 135 | 3,305 | 438 | 378 | 2,026 | 24.5 | 3.2 | 2.8 | 15.0 | |
| Jim Barnett | G/F | Oregon | 1 | 1976–1977 | 16 | 231 | 14 | 23 | 66 | 14.4 | 0.9 | 1.4 | 4.1 | |
| Dana Barros^{+} | G | Boston College | 2 | 1993–1995 | 163 | 5,837 | 470 | 1,043 | 2,761 | 35.8 | 2.9 | 6.4 | 16.9 | |
| Jerry Baskerville | F | Temple | 1 | 1975–1976 | 21 | 105 | 28 | 3 | 26 | 5.0 | 1.3 | 0.1 | 1.2 | |
| Charles Bassey | C | Western Kentucky | 2 | 2021–2022; 2025–2026 | 24 | 173 | 62 | 7 | 71 | 7.2 | 2.6 | 0.3 | 3.0 | |
| Tony Battie | F/C | Texas Tech | 2 | 2010–2012 | 65 | 672 | 166 | 28 | 142 | 10.3 | 2.6 | 0.4 | 2.2 | |
| Nicolas Batum | F | (France) Le Mans Sarthe | 1 | 2023–2024 | 57 | 1,475 | 241 | 123 | 312 | 25.9 | 4.2 | 2.2 | 5.5 | |
| Jerryd Bayless | G | Arizona | 2 | 2016–2018 | 42 | 996 | 92 | 67 | 340 | 23.7 | 2.2 | 1.6 | 8.1 | |
| Darius Bazley | F | Princeton High School (Ohio) | 1 | 2023–2024 | 3 | 10 | 1 | 2 | 0 | 3.3 | 0.3 | 0.7 | 0.0 | |
| MarJon Beauchamp | F | Yakima Valley | 1 | 2025–2026 | 14 | 196 | 32 | 15 | 95 | 14.0 | 2.3 | 1.1 | 6.8 | |
| Ernie Beck | G/F | Penn | 1 | 1960–1961 | 3 | 20 | 11 | 2 | 7 | 6.7 | 3.7 | 0.7 | 2.3 | |
| Marco Belinelli | G/F | (Italy) Fortitudo Bologna | 1 | 2017–2018 | 28 | 737 | 51 | 45 | 380 | 26.3 | 1.8 | 1.6 | 13.6 | |
| Raja Bell | G | FIU | 2 | 2000–2002 | 79 | 920 | 112 | 71 | 259 | 11.6 | 1.4 | 0.9 | 3.3 | |
| Benoit Benjamin | C | Creighton | 2 | 1997–1999 | 20 | 230 | 61 | 4 | 67 | 11.5 | 3.1 | 0.2 | 3.4 | |
| Elmer Bennett | G | Notre Dame | 1 | 1995–1996 | 8 | 66 | 5 | 8 | 11 | 8.3 | 0.6 | 1.0 | 1.4 | |
| Al Bianchi | G | Bowling Green | 10 | 1956–1966 | 687 | 13,649 | 1,722 | 1,497 | 5,550 | 19.9 | 2.5 | 2.2 | 8.1 | |
| Henry Bibby | G | UCLA | 4 | 1976–1980 | 327 | 9,730 | 976 | 1,498 | 3,309 | 29.8 | 3.0 | 4.6 | 10.1 | |
| John Block^{+} | F/C | USC | 1 | 1972–1973 | 48 | 1,558 | 442 | 94 | 858 | 32.5 | 9.2 | 2.0 | 17.9 | |
| Corie Blount | F | Cincinnati | 1 | 2001–2002 | 72 | 1,426 | 368 | 44 | 259 | 19.8 | 5.1 | 0.6 | 3.6 | |
| Manute Bol | C | Bridgeport | 4 | 1990–1994 | 215 | 3,693 | 771 | 60 | 397 | 17.2 | 3.6 | 0.3 | 1.8 | |
| Jonah Bolden | F | UCLA | 2 | 2018–2020 | 48 | 653 | 166 | 40 | 211 | 13.6 | 3.5 | 0.8 | 4.4 | |
| Adem Bona^{x} | C | UCLA | 2 | 2024–2026 | 129 | 2,139 | 552 | 59 | 681 | 16.6 | 4.3 | 0.5 | 5.3 | |
| Trevor Booker | F | Clemson | 1 | 2017–2018 | 33 | 494 | 122 | 27 | 156 | 15.0 | 3.7 | 0.8 | 4.7 | |
| Calvin Booth | C | Penn State | 1 | 2007–2008 | 31 | 204 | 38 | 8 | 24 | 6.6 | 1.2 | 0.3 | 0.8 | |
| Bruce Bowen | F | Cal State Fullerton | 1 | 1999–2000 | 42 | 311 | 36 | 16 | 59 | 7.4 | 0.9 | 0.4 | 1.4 | |
| Ira Bowman | G | Penn | 2 | 1999–2000; 2001–2002 | 14 | 49 | 3 | 2 | 15 | 3.5 | 0.2 | 0.1 | 1.1 | |
| Fred Boyd | G | Oregon State | 4 | 1972–1976 | 229 | 5,564 | 394 | 713 | 2,043 | 24.3 | 1.7 | 3.1 | 8.9 | |
| Craig Brackins | F | Iowa State | 2 | 2010–2012 | 17 | 121 | 19 | 9 | 30 | 7.1 | 1.1 | 0.5 | 1.8 | |
| Michael Bradley | F/C | Villanova | 2 | 2004–2006 | 48 | 383 | 110 | 18 | 76 | 8.0 | 2.3 | 0.4 | 1.6 | |
| Shawn Bradley | C | BYU | 3 | 1993–1996 | 143 | 4,084 | 1,071 | 159 | 1,387 | 28.6 | 7.5 | 1.1 | 9.7 | |
| Tony Bradley | F/C | North Carolina | 1 | 2020–2021 | 20 | 287 | 104 | 17 | 109 | 14.4 | 5.2 | 0.9 | 5.5 | |
| Mark Bradtke | F/C | (Australia) Adelaide 36ers | 1 | 1996–1997 | 36 | 251 | 68 | 7 | 59 | 7.0 | 1.9 | 0.2 | 1.6 | |
| Elton Brand | F | Duke | 5 | 2009–2012; 2015–2016 | 263 | 7,983 | 1,883 | 381 | 3,341 | 30.4 | 7.2 | 1.4 | 12.7 | |
| Jesse Branson | F | Elon | 1 | 1965–1966 | 5 | 14 | 9 | 1 | 5 | 2.8 | 1.8 | 0.2 | 1.0 | |
| Jim Brasco | G | NYU | 1 | 1952–1953 | 10 | 111 | 15 | 12 | 33 | 11.1 | 1.5 | 1.2 | 3.3 | |
| Ignas Brazdeikis | G/F | Michigan | 1 | 2020–2021 | 1 | 8 | 2 | 0 | 0 | 8.0 | 2.0 | 0.0 | 0.0 | |
| Corey Brewer | G/F | Florida | 1 | 2018–2019 | 7 | 140 | 17 | 10 | 53 | 20.0 | 2.4 | 1.4 | 7.6 | |
| Primož Brezec | C | (Slovenia) Union Olimpija | 1 | 2009–2010 | 7 | 36 | 12 | 0 | 5 | 5.1 | 1.7 | 0.0 | 0.7 | |
| Bill Bridges | F/C | Kansas | 2 | 1971–1973 | 74 | 2,586 | 983 | 181 | 987 | 34.9 | 13.3 | 2.4 | 13.3 | |
| Oshae Brissett | F | Syracuse | 1 | 2024–2025 | 6 | 142 | 22 | 4 | 52 | 23.7 | 3.7 | 0.7 | 8.7 | |
| Allan Bristow | G/F | Virginia Tech | 2 | 1973–1975 | 127 | 1,744 | 421 | 191 | 705 | 13.7 | 3.3 | 1.5 | 5.6 | |
| Scott Brooks | G | UC Irvine | 2 | 1988–1990 | 154 | 2,347 | 158 | 513 | 747 | 15.2 | 1.0 | 3.3 | 4.9 | |
| Johni Broome | C | Auburn | 1 | 2025–2026 | 11 | 55 | 16 | 4 | 10 | 5.0 | 1.5 | 0.4 | 0.9 | |
| Charlie Brown Jr. | G | Saint Joseph's | 1 | 2021–2022 | 19 | 162 | 31 | 5 | 28 | 8.5 | 1.6 | 0.3 | 1.5 | |
| Damone Brown | F | Syracuse | 1 | 2001–2002 | 17 | 67 | 4 | 2 | 23 | 3.9 | 0.2 | 0.1 | 1.4 | |
| Kedrick Brown | G | Northwest Florida State | 1 | 2004–2005 | 8 | 55 | 11 | 4 | 12 | 6.9 | 1.4 | 0.5 | 1.5 | |
| Kwame Brown | F | Glynn Academy (GA) | 1 | 2012–2013 | 22 | 269 | 74 | 9 | 41 | 12.2 | 3.4 | 0.4 | 1.9 | |
| Lorenzo Brown | G | NC State | 1 | 2013–2014 | 26 | 224 | 28 | 41 | 64 | 8.6 | 1.1 | 1.6 | 2.5 | |
| Mike Brown | F/C | George Washington | 1 | 1995–1996 | 9 | 162 | 37 | 3 | 26 | 18.0 | 4.1 | 0.3 | 2.9 | |
| Joe Bryant | F/C | La Salle | 4 | 1975–1979 | 287 | 4,115 | 934 | 341 | 1,849 | 14.3 | 3.3 | 1.2 | 6.4 | |
| Mark Bryant | F/C | Seton Hall | 1 | 2002–2003 | 11 | 77 | 16 | 1 | 12 | 7.0 | 1.5 | 0.1 | 1.1 | |
| Greg Buckner | G | Clemson | 2 | 2002–2004 | 128 | 2,217 | 319 | 141 | 614 | 17.3 | 2.5 | 1.1 | 4.8 | |
| Rodney Buford | G/F | Creighton | 1 | 2000–2001 | 47 | 573 | 74 | 17 | 248 | 12.2 | 1.6 | 0.4 | 5.3 | |
| Trey Burke | G | Michigan | 1 | 2019–2020 | 25 | 329 | 35 | 53 | 147 | 13.2 | 1.4 | 2.1 | 5.9 | |
| Alec Burks | G/F | Colorado | 1 | 2019–2020 | 18 | 364 | 56 | 38 | 220 | 20.2 | 3.1 | 2.1 | 12.2 | |
| Willie Burton | G/F | Minnesota | 1 | 1994–1995 | 53 | 1,564 | 164 | 96 | 812 | 29.5 | 3.1 | 1.8 | 15.3 | |
| Jared Butler | G | Baylor | 1 | 2024–2025 | 28 | 682 | 69 | 138 | 321 | 24.4 | 2.5 | 4.9 | 11.5 | |
| Jimmy Butler | G/F | Marquette | 1 | 2018–2019 | 55 | 1,824 | 290 | 220 | 1,002 | 33.2 | 5.3 | 4.0 | 18.2 | |

=== C ===
All-time roster
| Player | Pos. | Pre-draft team | Yrs | Seasons | Statistics | | | | | | | | | Ref. |
| Player | Pos. | Pre-draft team | Yrs | Seasons | GP | MP | REB | AST | PTS | MPG | RPG | APG | PPG | Ref. |
|---|---|---|---|---|---|---|---|---|---|---|---|---|---|---|
| Barney Cable | F | Bradley | 2 | 1959–1961 | 125 | 2,241 | 646 | 118 | 819 | 17.9 | 5.2 | 0.9 | 6.6 | |
| Michael Cage | F/C | San Diego State | 1 | 1996–1997 | 82 | 1,247 | 320 | 43 | 151 | 15.2 | 3.9 | 0.5 | 1.8 | |
| Gerald Calabrese | G | St. John's | 2 | 1950–1952 | 104 | 937 | 149 | 148 | 492 | 16.2 | 1.4 | 1.4 | 4.7 | |
| Adrian Caldwell | F/C | Lamar | 1 | 1996–1997 | 27 | 365 | 111 | 7 | 72 | 13.5 | 4.1 | 0.3 | 2.7 | |
| Bill Calhoun | G/F | CC San Francisco | 1 | 1952–1953 | 13 | 239 | 27 | 15 | 64 | 18.4 | 2.1 | 1.2 | 4.9 | |
| Isaiah Canaan | G | Murray State | 2 | 2014–2016 | 99 | 2,535 | 228 | 206 | 1,124 | 25.6 | 2.3 | 2.1 | 11.4 | |
| Larry Cannon | G | La Salle | 1 | 1973–1974 | 19 | 335 | 36 | 52 | 117 | 17.6 | 1.9 | 2.7 | 6.2 | |
| Rodney Carney | F | Memphis | 3 | 2006–2008; 2009–2010 | 205 | 3,065 | 414 | 95 | 1,170 | 15.0 | 2.0 | 0.5 | 5.7 | |
| Butch Carter | G | Indiana | 1 | 1985–1986 | 4 | 36 | 1 | 1 | 15 | 9.0 | 0.3 | 0.3 | 3.8 | |
| Fred Carter | G/F | Mount St. Mary's | 6 | 1971–1977 | 409 | 14,459 | 1,826 | 1,720 | 7,673 | 35.4 | 4.5 | 4.2 | 18.8 | |
| Michael Carter-Williams | G | Syracuse | 2 | 2013–2015 | 111 | 3,805 | 691 | 743 | 1,780 | 34.3 | 6.2 | 6.7 | 16.0 | |
| Colin Castleton | C | Florida | 1 | 2024–2025 | 5 | 98 | 37 | 10 | 30 | 19.6 | 7.4 | 2.0 | 6.0 | |
| Harvey Catchings | F/C | Hardin-Simmons | 5 | 1974–1979 | 251 | 4,160 | 1,255 | 166 | 762 | 16.6 | 5.0 | 0.7 | 3.0 | |
| Terry Catledge | F | South Alabama | 1 | 1985–1986 | 64 | 1,092 | 272 | 21 | 494 | 17.1 | 4.3 | 0.3 | 7.7 | |
| Willie Cauley-Stein | C | Kentucky | 1 | 2021–2022 | 2 | 6 | 2 | 1 | 0 | 3.0 | 1.0 | 0.5 | 0.0 | |
| Al Cervi^ | G/F | Buffalo East HS (NY) | 4 | 1949–1953 | 202 | 1,151 | 261 | 648 | 1,591 | 12.4 | 1.8 | 3.2 | 7.9 | |
| Wilt Chamberlain^ (#13) | C | Kansas | 4 | 1964–1968 | 277 | 12,813 | 6,632 | 1,879 | 7,651 | 46.3 | 23.9 | 6.8 | 27.6 | |
| Tom Chambers | F/C | Utah | 1 | 1997–1998 | 1 | 10 | 2 | 0 | 6 | 10.0 | 2.0 | 0.0 | 6.0 | |
| Julian Champagnie | G/F | St. John's | 1 | 2022–2023 | 2 | 7 | 0 | 0 | 0 | 3.5 | 0.0 | 0.0 | 0.0 | |
| Wilson Chandler | F | DePaul | 1 | 2018–2019 | 36 | 951 | 168 | 72 | 241 | 26.4 | 4.7 | 2.0 | 6.7 | |
| Len Chappell | F/C | Wake Forest | 2 | 1962–1964 | 81 | 1,257 | 465 | 56 | 711 | 15.5 | 5.7 | 0.7 | 8.8 | |
| Maurice Cheeks^ (#10) | G | West Texas A&M | 11 | 1978–1989 | 853 | 28,583 | 2,538 | 6,212 | 10,429 | 33.5 | 3.0 | 7.3 | 12.2 | |
| Leroy Chollet | F | Canisius | 2 | 1949–1951 | 63 | | 15 | 49 | 181 | | 1.1 | 0.8 | 2.9 | |
| Archie Clark | G | Minnesota | 4 | 1968–1972 | 241 | 8,203 | 960 | 1,123 | 4,381 | 34.0 | 4.0 | 4.7 | 18.2 | |
| Gary Clark | F | Cincinnati | 1 | 2020–2021 | 2 | 13 | 2 | 1 | 0 | 6.5 | 1.0 | 0.5 | 0.0 | |
| Speedy Claxton | G | Hofstra | 1 | 2001–2002 | 67 | 1,528 | 160 | 198 | 480 | 22.8 | 2.4 | 3.0 | 7.2 | |
| Ben Coleman | F | Maryland | 2 | 1987–1989 | 101 | 1,544 | 354 | 40 | 591 | 15.3 | 3.5 | 0.4 | 5.9 | |
| Derrick Coleman | F | Syracuse | 6 | 1995–1998; 2001–2004 | 283 | 9,196 | 2,383 | 600 | 3,943 | 32.5 | 8.4 | 2.1 | 13.9 | |
| Doug Collins^{+} | G/F | Illinois State | 8 | 1973–1981 | 415 | 13,945 | 1,339 | 1,368 | 7,427 | 33.6 | 3.2 | 3.3 | 17.9 | |
| Steve Colter | G | New Mexico State | 2 | 1986–1988 | 55 | 1,001 | 84 | 142 | 330 | 18.2 | 1.5 | 2.6 | 6.0 | |
| Ed Conlin | G/F | Fordham | 4 | 1955–1959 | 254 | 7,145 | 1,495 | 598 | 3,075 | 28.1 | 5.9 | 2.4 | 12.1 | |
| Lanard Copeland | G | Georgia State | 1 | 1989–1990 | 23 | 110 | 10 | 9 | 74 | 4.8 | 0.4 | 0.4 | 3.2 | |
| Ray Corley | G | Georgetown | 1 | 1949–1950 | 60 | | | 109 | 309 | | | 1.8 | 5.2 | |
| Larry Costello^{+} | G | Niagara | 10 | 1957–1965; 1966–1968 | 615 | 18,624 | 2,333 | 2,901 | 7,957 | 30.3 | 3.8 | 4.7 | 12.9 | |
| Ricky Council IV | G/F | Arkansas | 2 | 2023–2025 | 105 | 1,539 | 260 | 113 | 705 | 14.7 | 2.5 | 1.1 | 6.7 | |
| Mel Counts | F/C | Oregon State | 1 | 1972–1973 | 7 | 47 | 16 | 3 | 10 | 6.7 | 2.3 | 0.4 | 1.4 | |
| Steve Courtin | G | Saint Joseph's | 1 | 1964–1965 | 24 | 317 | 22 | 22 | 101 | 13.2 | 0.9 | 0.9 | 4.2 | |
| Joe Courtney | F | Southern Miss | 1 | 1996–1997 | 4 | 52 | 9 | 0 | 12 | 13.0 | 2.3 | 0.0 | 3.0 | |
| Robert Covington | F | Tennessee State | 6 | 2014–2019; 2023–2024 | 323 | 9,369 | 1,760 | 491 | 3,939 | 29.0 | 5.4 | 1.5 | 12.2 | |
| Freddie Crawford | G/F | St. Bonaventure | 1 | 1970–1971 | 36 | 449 | 69 | 54 | 180 | 12.5 | 1.9 | 1.5 | 5.0 | |
| Terry Cummings | F | DePaul | 1 | 1997–1998 | 44 | 656 | 148 | 21 | 233 | 14.9 | 3.4 | 0.5 | 5.3 | |
| Vonteego Cummings | G | Pittsburgh | 1 | 2001–2002 | 58 | 501 | 52 | 60 | 192 | 8.6 | 0.9 | 1.0 | 3.3 | |
| Billy Cunningham^ (#32) | F/C | North Carolina | 9 | 1965–1972; 1974–1976 | 654 | 22,406 | 6,638 | 2,625 | 13,626 | 34.3 | 10.1 | 4.0 | 20.8 | |
| William Cunningham | C | Temple | 1 | 1997–1998 | 1 | 1 | 2 | 0 | 0 | 1.0 | 2.0 | 0.0 | 0.0 | |
| Earl Cureton | F/C | Detroit Mercy | 3 | 1980–1983 | 191 | 2,471 | 694 | 100 | 817 | 12.9 | 3.6 | 0.5 | 4.3 | |
| Michael Curry | G/F | Georgia Southern | 1 | 1993–1994 | 10 | 43 | 1 | 1 | 9 | 4.3 | 0.1 | 0.1 | 0.9 | |
| Seth Curry | G | Duke | 2 | 2020–2022 | 102 | 3,204 | 287 | 336 | 1,387 | 31.4 | 2.8 | 3.3 | 13.6 | |

=== D to E ===
All-time roster
| Player | Pos. | Pre-draft team | Yrs | Seasons | Statistics | | | | | | | | | Ref. |
| Player | Pos. | Pre-draft team | Yrs | Seasons | GP | MP | REB | AST | PTS | MPG | RPG | APG | PPG | Ref. |
|---|---|---|---|---|---|---|---|---|---|---|---|---|---|---|
| Samuel Dalembert | C | Seton Hall | 8 | 2001–2002; 2003–2010 | 582 | 15,339 | 4,844 | 277 | 4,710 | 26.4 | 8.3 | 0.5 | 8.1 | |
| Antonio Daniels | G | Bowling Green | 1 | 2010–2011 | 4 | 35 | 5 | 2 | 6 | 8.8 | 1.3 | 0.5 | 1.5 | |
| Lloyd Daniels | G | Mt. SAC | 1 | 1994–1995 | 5 | 63 | 7 | 4 | 23 | 12.6 | 1.4 | 0.8 | 4.6 | |
| Brandon Davies | F | BYU | 2 | 2013–2015 | 71 | 954 | 182 | 56 | 270 | 13.4 | 2.6 | 0.8 | 3.8 | |
| Josh Davis | F | Wyoming | 1 | 2004–2005 | 42 | 328 | 79 | 12 | 117 | 7.8 | 1.9 | 0.3 | 2.8 | |
| Mark Davis | G/F | Texas Tech | 2 | 1996–1998 | 146 | 2,611 | 481 | 208 | 921 | 17.9 | 3.3 | 1.4 | 6.3 | |
| Monti Davis | F | Tennessee State | 1 | 1980–1981 | 1 | 2 | 1 | 0 | 2 | 2.0 | 1.0 | 0.0 | 2.0 | |
| Darryl Dawkins | C | Maynard Evans HS (FL) | 7 | 1975–1982 | 448 | 10,359 | 3,008 | 553 | 5,009 | 23.1 | 6.7 | 1.2 | 11.2 | |
| Johnny Dawkins | G | Duke | 5 | 1989–1994 | 313 | 8,745 | 749 | 1,798 | 3,343 | 27.9 | 2.4 | 5.7 | 10.7 | |
| Dewayne Dedmon | C | USC | 2 | 2013–2014; 2022–2023 | 19 | 226 | 74 | 13 | 65 | 11.9 | 3.9 | 0.7 | 3.4 | |
| George Dempsey | G | King's | 1 | 1958–1959 | 34 | 410 | 100 | 36 | 170 | 12.1 | 2.9 | 1.1 | 5.0 | |
| Connie Dierking | F/C | Cincinnati | 5 | 1958–1960; 1963–1965; 1970–1971 | 302 | 4,574 | 1,577 | 239 | 1,882 | 15.1 | 5.2 | 0.8 | 6.2 | |
| Jeff Dowtin | G | Rhode Island | 2 | 2023–2025 | 53 | 763 | 80 | 105 | 337 | 14.4 | 1.5 | 2.0 | 6.4 | |
| Larry Drew | G | UCLA | 2 | 2014–2015; 2017–2018 | 15 | 234 | 16 | 47 | 48 | 15.6 | 1.1 | 3.1 | 3.2 | |
| Andre Drummond | C | UConn | 3 | 2021–2022; 2024–2026 | 152 | 2,884 | 1,275 | 211 | 994 | 19.0 | 8.4 | 1.4 | 6.5 | |
| Richard Dumas | F | Oklahoma State | 1 | 1995–1996 | 39 | 739 | 99 | 44 | 241 | 18.9 | 2.5 | 1.1 | 6.2 | |
| Mike Dunleavy | G | South Carolina | 2 | 1976–1978 | 36 | 376 | 35 | 62 | 162 | 10.4 | 1.0 | 1.7 | 4.5 | |
| Ken Durrett | F | La Salle | 1 | 1974–1975 | 27 | 270 | 62 | 10 | 90 | 10.0 | 2.3 | 0.4 | 3.3 | |
| Ed Earle | F | Loyola (IL) | 1 | 1953–1954 | 2 | 12 | 2 | 0 | 4 | 6.0 | 1.0 | 0.0 | 2.0 | |
| VJ Edgecombe^{x} | G | Baylor | 1 | 2025–2026 | 75 | 2,623 | 423 | 315 | 1,199 | 35.0 | 5.6 | 4.2 | 16.0 | |
| Bill Edwards | F | Wright State | 1 | 1993–1994 | 3 | 44 | 14 | 4 | 6 | 14.7 | 4.7 | 1.3 | 2.0 | |
| Franklin Edwards | G | Cleveland State | 3 | 1981–1984 | 183 | 2,211 | 171 | 356 | 894 | 12.1 | 0.9 | 1.9 | 4.9 | |
| Justin Edwards^{x} | F | Kentucky | 2 | 2024–2026 | 108 | 2,132 | 242 | 149 | 831 | 19.7 | 2.2 | 1.4 | 7.7 | |
| Mario Elie | G/F | American International | 1 | 1990–1991 | 3 | 20 | 1 | 1 | 6 | 6.7 | 0.3 | 0.3 | 2.0 | |
| LeRoy Ellis | F/C | St. John's | 4 | 1972–1976 | 261 | 7,947 | 2,338 | 463 | 2,529 | 30.4 | 9.0 | 1.8 | 9.7 | |
| Francisco Elson | C | California | 2 | 2009–2010; 2011–2012 | 6 | 20 | 2 | 1 | 4 | 3.3 | 0.3 | 0.2 | 0.7 | |
| Joel Embiid* | C | Kansas | 10 | 2016–2026 | 490 | 15,608 | 5,280 | 1,808 | 13,544 | 31.9 | 10.8 | 3.7 | 27.6 | |
| James Ennis | F | Long Beach State | 2 | 2018–2020 | 67 | 1,057 | 215 | 55 | 380 | 15.8 | 3.2 | 0.8 | 5.7 | |
| Julius Erving^ (#6) | G/F | UMass | 11 | 1976–1987 | 836 | 28,677 | 5,601 | 3,224 | 18,364 | 34.3 | 6.7 | 3.9 | 22.0 | |
| Reggie Evans | F | Iowa | 2 | 2007–2009 | 160 | 3,016 | 972 | 91 | 687 | 18.9 | 6.1 | 0.6 | 4.3 | |

=== F to G ===
All-time roster
| Player | Pos. | Pre-draft team | Yrs | Seasons | Statistics | | | | | | | | | Ref. |
| Player | Pos. | Pre-draft team | Yrs | Seasons | GP | MP | REB | AST | PTS | MPG | RPG | APG | PPG | Ref. |
|---|---|---|---|---|---|---|---|---|---|---|---|---|---|---|
| Dick Farley | G/F | Indiana | 2 | 1954–1956 | 141 | 2,542 | 332 | 262 | 887 | 18.0 | 2.4 | 1.9 | 6.3 | |
| Jim Farmer | G | Alabama | 1 | 1990–1991 | 2 | 13 | 5 | 0 | 6 | 6.5 | 2.5 | 0.0 | 3.0 | |
| Terrance Ferguson | G/F | Advanced Prep International (TX) | 1 | 2020–2021 | 13 | 49 | 1 | 2 | 2 | 3.8 | 0.1 | 0.2 | 0.2 | |
| Ron Filipek | F | Tennessee Tech | 1 | 1967–1968 | 19 | 73 | 25 | 7 | 43 | 3.8 | 1.3 | 0.4 | 2.3 | |
| Alphonso Ford | G | Mississippi Valley State | 1 | 1994–1995 | 5 | 98 | 20 | 9 | 19 | 19.6 | 4.0 | 1.8 | 3.8 | |
| Fred Foster | F | Miami (OH) | 2 | 1970–1972 | 140 | 2,587 | 423 | 151 | 1,241 | 18.5 | 3.0 | 1.1 | 8.9 | |
| Michael Foster Jr. | F | Hillcrest Prep (AZ) | 1 | 2022–2023 | 1 | 1 | 0 | 0 | 0 | 1.0 | 0.0 | 0.0 | 0.0 | |
| Tim Frazier | G | Penn State | 1 | 2014–2015 | 6 | 171 | 19 | 43 | 34 | 28.5 | 3.2 | 7.2 | 5.7 | |
| World B. Free | G | Guilford | 4 | 1975–1978; 1986–1987 | 245 | 5,709 | 593 | 706 | 3,165 | 23.3 | 2.4 | 2.9 | 12.9 | |
| Rod Freeman | F | Vanderbilt | 1 | 1973–1974 | 35 | 265 | 54 | 14 | 106 | 7.6 | 1.5 | 0.4 | 3.0 | |
| Markelle Fultz | G | Washington | 2 | 2017–2019 | 33 | 680 | 113 | 112 | 255 | 20.6 | 3.4 | 3.4 | 7.7 | |
| Terry Furlow | G/F | Michigan State | 1 | 1976–1977 | 32 | 174 | 39 | 19 | 84 | 5.4 | 1.2 | 0.6 | 2.6 | |
| Billy Gabor^{+} | G/F | Syracuse | 6 | 1949–1955 | 307 | 3,680 | 448 | 626 | 2,997 | 19.4 | 1.8 | 2.0 | 9.8 | |
| Deng Gai | F | Fairfield | 1 | 2005–2006 | 2 | 5 | 0 | 0 | 0 | 2.5 | 0.0 | 0.0 | 0.0 | |
| Corey Gaines | G | Loyola Marymount | 2 | 1989–1990; 1994–1995 | 20 | 361 | 23 | 59 | 65 | 18.1 | 1.2 | 3.0 | 3.3 | |
| Dave Gambee | F | Oregon State | 7 | 1960–1967 | 475 | 10,370 | 2,695 | 524 | 5,454 | 21.8 | 5.7 | 1.1 | 11.5 | |
| Matt Geiger | C | Georgia Tech | 4 | 1998–2002 | 154 | 3,524 | 894 | 111 | 1,519 | 22.9 | 5.8 | 0.7 | 9.9 | |
| Paul George | F | Fresno State | 2 | 2024–2026 | 78 | 2,469 | 415 | 311 | 1,306 | 31.7 | 5.3 | 4.0 | 16.7 | |
| Armen Gilliam | F/C | UNLV | 3 | 1990–1993 | 211 | 6,208 | 1,496 | 312 | 3,107 | 29.4 | 7.1 | 1.5 | 14.7 | |
| Gordan Giriček | G/F | (Croatia) Cibona Zagreb | 1 | 2007–2008 | 12 | 110 | 14 | 11 | 37 | 9.2 | 1.2 | 0.9 | 3.1 | |
| Mike Gminski | C | Duke | 4 | 1987–1991 | 240 | 7,956 | 2,151 | 383 | 3,585 | 33.2 | 9.0 | 1.6 | 14.9 | |
| Drew Gordon | F | New Mexico | 1 | 2014–2015 | 9 | 71 | 18 | 2 | 17 | 7.9 | 2.0 | 0.2 | 1.9 | |
| Eric Gordon | G | Indiana | 2 | 2024–2026 | 45 | 842 | 48 | 68 | 299 | 18.7 | 1.1 | 1.5 | 6.6 | |
| Bato Govedarica | G | DePaul | 1 | 1953–1954 | 23 | 258 | 18 | 24 | 75 | 11.2 | 0.8 | 1.0 | 3.3 | |
| Joe Graboski | F/C | Roberto Clemente HS (IL) | 1 | 1961–1962 | 23 | 323 | 105 | 20 | 118 | 14.0 | 4.6 | 0.9 | 5.1 | |
| Greg Graham | G | Indiana | 3 | 1993–1996 | 128 | 1,792 | 163 | 143 | 645 | 14.0 | 1.3 | 1.1 | 5.0 | |
| Greg Grant | G | TCNJ | 3 | 1991–1993; 1995–1996 | 138 | 2,110 | 153 | 465 | 463 | 15.3 | 1.1 | 3.4 | 3.4 | |
| Harvey Grant | F | Oklahoma | 1 | 1998–1999 | 47 | 798 | 110 | 23 | 146 | 17.0 | 2.3 | 0.5 | 3.1 | |
| Jerami Grant | F | Syracuse | 3 | 2014–2017 | 144 | 3,484 | 565 | 214 | 1,176 | 24.2 | 3.9 | 1.5 | 8.2 | |
| Jeff Grayer | G/F | Iowa State | 1 | 1994–1995 | 47 | 1,098 | 149 | 74 | 389 | 23.4 | 3.2 | 1.6 | 8.3 | |
| Danny Green | G/F | North Carolina | 3 | 2020–2022; 2023–2024 | 133 | 3,305 | 419 | 183 | 1,020 | 24.8 | 3.2 | 1.4 | 7.7 | |
| Johnny Green | F/C | Michigan State | 2 | 1967–1969 | 109 | 1,162 | 452 | 68 | 526 | 10.7 | 4.1 | 0.6 | 4.8 | |
| Kenny Green | F | Wake Forest | 2 | 1985–1987 | 40 | 404 | 63 | 13 | 156 | 10.1 | 1.6 | 0.3 | 3.9 | |
| Luther Green | F | LIU Brooklyn | 1 | 1972–1973 | 5 | 32 | 3 | 0 | 3 | 6.4 | 0.6 | 0.0 | 0.6 | |
| Rickey Green | G | Michigan | 1 | 1990–1991 | 79 | 2,248 | 137 | 413 | 793 | 28.5 | 1.7 | 5.2 | 10.0 | |
| Sean Green | G/F | Iona | 1 | 1993–1994 | 35 | 332 | 34 | 16 | 149 | 9.5 | 1.0 | 0.5 | 4.3 | |
| Willie Green | G | Detroit Mercy | 7 | 2003–2010 | 422 | 9,179 | 808 | 731 | 3,954 | 21.8 | 1.9 | 1.7 | 9.4 | |
| Jerry Greenspan | F | Maryland | 2 | 1963–1965 | 25 | 329 | 83 | 11 | 122 | 13.2 | 3.3 | 0.4 | 4.9 | |
| Hal Greer^ (#15) | G/F | Marshall | 15 | 1958–1973 | 1,122 | 39,788 | 5,665 | 4,540 | 21,586 | 35.5 | 5.0 | 4.0 | 19.2 | |
| Quentin Grimes | G | Houston | 2 | 2024–2026 | 103 | 3,149 | 418 | 371 | 1,618 | 30.6 | 4.1 | 3.6 | 15.7 | |
| Matt Guokas | G/F | Saint Joseph's | 5 | 1966–1971 | 304 | 4,821 | 579 | 622 | 1,427 | 15.9 | 1.9 | 2.0 | 4.7 | |

=== H ===
All-time roster
| Player | Pos. | Pre-draft team | Yrs | Seasons | Statistics | | | | | | | | | Ref. |
| Player | Pos. | Pre-draft team | Yrs | Seasons | GP | MP | REB | AST | PTS | MPG | RPG | APG | PPG | Ref. |
|---|---|---|---|---|---|---|---|---|---|---|---|---|---|---|
| Swede Halbrook | C | Oregon State | 2 | 1960–1962 | 143 | 2,039 | 949 | 64 | 786 | 14.3 | 6.6 | 0.4 | 5.5 | |
| Shaler Halimon | G/F | Utah State | 1 | 1968–1969 | 50 | 350 | 86 | 18 | 186 | 7.0 | 1.7 | 0.4 | 3.7 | |
| Jeff Halliburton | G | Drake | 1 | 1972–1973 | 31 | 549 | 82 | 68 | 294 | 17.7 | 2.6 | 2.2 | 9.5 | |
| Zendon Hamilton | F/C | St. John's | 2 | 2003–2004; 2005–2006 | 47 | 476 | 146 | 13 | 170 | 10.1 | 3.1 | 0.3 | 3.6 | |
| Alex Hannum^ | F/C | USC | 2 | 1949–1951 | 127 | | 301 | 248 | 953 | | 4.8 | 2.0 | 7.5 | |
| James Harden | G | Arizona State | 2 | 2021–2023 | 79 | 2,927 | 503 | 838 | 1,658 | 37.1 | 6.4 | 10.6 | 21.0 | |
| Jerome Harmon | G | Louisville | 1 | 1994–1995 | 10 | 158 | 23 | 12 | 46 | 15.8 | 2.3 | 1.2 | 4.6 | |
| Justin Harper | F | Richmond | 1 | 2016–2017 | 3 | 31 | 5 | 2 | 12 | 10.3 | 1.7 | 0.7 | 4.0 | |
| Matt Harpring | F | Georgia Tech | 1 | 2001–2002 | 81 | 2,541 | 573 | 107 | 958 | 31.4 | 7.1 | 1.3 | 11.8 | |
| Montrezl Harrell | F/C | Louisville | 1 | 2022–2023 | 57 | 681 | 159 | 33 | 320 | 11.9 | 2.8 | 0.6 | 5.6 | |
| Lucious Harris | G | Long Beach State | 1 | 1996–1997 | 54 | 813 | 71 | 50 | 293 | 15.1 | 1.3 | 0.9 | 5.4 | |
| Tobias Harris | F | Tennessee | 6 | 2018–2024 | 378 | 12,774 | 2,500 | 1,181 | 6,659 | 33.8 | 6.6 | 3.1 | 17.6 | |
| Tony Harris | G | New Orleans | 1 | 1990–1991 | 6 | 41 | 1 | 0 | 10 | 6.8 | 0.2 | 0.0 | 1.7 | |
| Bob Harrison | G | Michigan | 2 | 1956–1958 | 72 | 1,799 | 166 | 169 | 517 | 25.0 | 2.3 | 2.3 | 7.2 | |
| Spencer Hawes | F/C | Washington | 4 | 2010–2014 | 253 | 6,537 | 1,777 | 578 | 2,532 | 25.8 | 7.0 | 2.3 | 10.0 | |
| Hersey Hawkins^{+} | G | Bradley | 5 | 1988–1993 | 403 | 14,533 | 1,456 | 1,364 | 7,657 | 36.1 | 3.6 | 3.4 | 19.0 | |
| Steve Hayes | C | Idaho State | 1 | 1984–1985 | 11 | 101 | 34 | 1 | 22 | 9.2 | 3.1 | 0.1 | 2.0 | |
| Alan Henderson | F | Indiana | 1 | 2006–2007 | 38 | 418 | 107 | 10 | 119 | 11.0 | 2.8 | 0.3 | 3.1 | |
| David Henderson | G | Duke | 1 | 1987–1988 | 22 | 351 | 35 | 34 | 126 | 16.0 | 1.6 | 1.5 | 5.7 | |
| Gerald Henderson | G | VCU | 2 | 1987–1989 | 134 | 2,422 | 165 | 358 | 1,006 | 18.1 | 1.2 | 2.7 | 7.5 | |
| Gerald Henderson Jr. | G | Duke | 1 | 2016–2017 | 72 | 1,667 | 185 | 112 | 662 | 23.2 | 2.6 | 1.6 | 9.2 | |
| Mark Hendrickson | F | Washington State | 1 | 1996–1997 | 29 | 301 | 92 | 3 | 85 | 10.4 | 3.2 | 0.1 | 2.9 | |
| Larry Hennessy | G | Villanova | 1 | 1956–1957 | 21 | 373 | 45 | 27 | 135 | 17.8 | 2.1 | 1.3 | 6.4 | |
| Aaron Henry | F | Michigan State | 1 | 2021–2022 | 6 | 17 | 1 | 0 | 2 | 2.8 | 0.2 | 0.0 | 0.3 | |
| Al Henry | C | Wisconsin | 2 | 1970–1972 | 49 | 447 | 148 | 8 | 194 | 9.1 | 3.0 | 0.2 | 4.0 | |
| Fred Hetzel | F/C | Davidson | 1 | 1969–1970 | 63 | 757 | 207 | 44 | 383 | 12.0 | 3.3 | 0.7 | 6.1 | |
| Art Heyman | G/F | Duke | 1 | 1965–1966 | 6 | 20 | 4 | 4 | 10 | 3.3 | 0.7 | 0.7 | 1.7 | |
| Buddy Hield | G/F | Oklahoma | 1 | 2023–2024 | 32 | 824 | 102 | 97 | 390 | 25.8 | 3.2 | 3.0 | 12.2 | |
| Sean Higgins | G/F | Michigan | 1 | 1995–1996 | 44 | 916 | 92 | 55 | 351 | 20.8 | 2.1 | 1.3 | 8.0 | |
| Haywood Highsmith | F | Wheeling Jesuit | 1 | 2018–2019 | 5 | 40 | 5 | 2 | 9 | 8.0 | 1.0 | 0.4 | 1.8 | |
| George Hill | G | IUPUI | 1 | 2020–2021 | 16 | 303 | 32 | 30 | 96 | 18.9 | 2.0 | 1.9 | 6.0 | |
| Tyrone Hill | F | Xavier | 4 | 1998–2001; 2002–2003 | 189 | 5,601 | 1,589 | 127 | 1,831 | 29.6 | 8.4 | 0.7 | 9.7 | |
| Roy Hinson | F/C | Rutgers | 2 | 1986–1988 | 105 | 3,334 | 657 | 87 | 1,394 | 31.8 | 6.3 | 0.8 | 13.3 | |
| Jrue Holiday^{+} | G | UCLA | 4 | 2009–2013 | 298 | 9,790 | 1,064 | 1,726 | 3,994 | 32.9 | 3.6 | 5.8 | 13.4 | |
| Justin Holiday | F | Washington | 1 | 2012–2013 | 9 | 142 | 14 | 15 | 42 | 15.8 | 1.6 | 1.7 | 4.7 | |
| Lionel Hollins | G | Arizona State | 3 | 1979–1982 | 190 | 5,207 | 447 | 780 | 2,004 | 27.4 | 2.4 | 4.1 | 10.5 | |
| Richaun Holmes | F/C | Bowling Green | 3 | 2015–2018 | 156 | 2,641 | 657 | 152 | 1,157 | 16.9 | 4.2 | 1.0 | 7.4 | |
| Joe Holup | F | George Washington | 2 | 1956–1958 | 87 | 1,417 | 302 | 97 | 568 | 16.3 | 3.5 | 1.1 | 6.5 | |
| Jerald Honeycutt | G/F | Tulane | 1 | 1998–1999 | 13 | 90 | 11 | 3 | 25 | 6.9 | 0.8 | 0.2 | 1.9 | |
| Jalen Hood-Schifino | G | Indiana | 1 | 2024–2025 | 13 | 301 | 26 | 36 | 102 | 23.2 | 2.0 | 2.8 | 7.8 | |
| Bob Hopkins | F/C | Grambling State | 4 | 1956–1960 | 273 | 5,122 | 1,526 | 189 | 2,237 | 18.8 | 5.6 | 0.7 | 8.2 | |
| Dave Hoppen | F/C | Nebraska | 2 | 1990–1992 | 22 | 83 | 19 | 2 | 29 | 3.8 | 0.9 | 0.1 | 1.3 | |
| Al Horford | F/C | Florida | 1 | 2019–2020 | 67 | 2,025 | 456 | 270 | 798 | 30.2 | 6.8 | 4.0 | 11.9 | |
| Jeff Hornacek | G | Iowa State | 2 | 1992–1994 | 132 | 4,854 | 554 | 863 | 2,391 | 36.8 | 4.2 | 6.5 | 18.1 | |
| Danuel House Jr. | F | Texas A&M | 2 | 2022–2024 | 90 | 1,316 | 152 | 72 | 412 | 14.6 | 1.7 | 0.8 | 4.6 | |
| Dwight Howard | C | SACA (GA) | 1 | 2020–2021 | 69 | 1,196 | 580 | 61 | 482 | 17.3 | 8.4 | 0.9 | 7.0 | |
| Bailey Howell^ | F | Mississippi State | 1 | 1970–1971 | 82 | 1,589 | 441 | 115 | 878 | 19.4 | 5.4 | 1.4 | 10.7 | |
| Larry Hughes | G | Saint Louis | 2 | 1998–2000 | 100 | 2,006 | 348 | 152 | 956 | 20.1 | 3.5 | 1.5 | 9.6 | |
| Steven Hunter | C | DePaul | 2 | 2005–2007 | 139 | 2,917 | 606 | 43 | 871 | 21.0 | 4.4 | 0.3 | 6.3 | |

=== I to J ===
All-time roster
| Player | Pos. | Pre-draft team | Yrs | Seasons | Statistics | | | | | | | | | Ref. |
| Player | Pos. | Pre-draft team | Yrs | Seasons | GP | MP | REB | AST | PTS | MPG | RPG | APG | PPG | Ref. |
|---|---|---|---|---|---|---|---|---|---|---|---|---|---|---|
| Marc Iavaroni | F | Virginia | 3 | 1982–1985 | 170 | 3,300 | 668 | 184 | 829 | 19.4 | 3.9 | 1.1 | 4.9 | |
| Andre Iguodala^{+} | G/F | Arizona | 8 | 2004–2012 | 615 | 23,216 | 3,593 | 2,991 | 9,422 | 37.7 | 5.8 | 4.9 | 15.3 | |
| Ersan İlyasova | F | (Turkey) Ülkerspor | 2 | 2016–2018 | 76 | 2,001 | 468 | 136 | 1,035 | 26.3 | 6.2 | 1.8 | 13.6 | |
| Darrall Imhoff | C | California | 2 | 1968–1970 | 161 | 4,834 | 1,546 | 429 | 1,827 | 30.0 | 9.6 | 2.7 | 11.3 | |
| Allen Iverson^ (#3) | G | Georgetown | 12 | 1996–2007; 2009–2010 | 722 | 29,879 | 2,822 | 4,385 | 19,931 | 41.4 | 3.9 | 6.1 | 27.6 | |
| Royal Ivey | G | Texas | 3 | 2008–2010; 2012–2013 | 150 | 1,795 | 159 | 92 | 451 | 12.0 | 1.1 | 0.6 | 3.0 | |
| Demetrius Jackson | G | Notre Dame | 2 | 2017–2019 | 9 | 56 | 4 | 9 | 30 | 6.2 | 0.4 | 1.0 | 3.3 | |
| Jaren Jackson | G/F | Georgetown | 1 | 1994–1995 | 21 | 257 | 42 | 19 | 70 | 12.2 | 2.0 | 0.9 | 3.3 | |
| Jim Jackson | G | Ohio State | 1 | 1997–1998 | 48 | 1,788 | 227 | 223 | 657 | 37.3 | 4.7 | 4.6 | 13.7 | |
| Lucious Jackson^{+} | F/C | UTPA | 8 | 1964–1972 | 522 | 13,783 | 4,613 | 818 | 5,170 | 26.4 | 8.8 | 1.6 | 9.9 | |
| Marc Jackson | C | Temple | 2 | 2003–2005 | 103 | 2,574 | 532 | 99 | 1,175 | 25.0 | 5.2 | 1.0 | 11.4 | |
| Reggie Jackson | G | Boston College | 1 | 2024–2025 | 31 | 384 | 42 | 45 | 136 | 12.4 | 1.4 | 1.5 | 4.4 | |
| Tim James | F | Miami (FL) | 1 | 2001–2002 | 9 | 41 | 7 | 1 | 12 | 4.6 | 0.8 | 0.1 | 1.3 | |
| Charles Jenkins | G | Hofstra | 1 | 2012–2013 | 12 | 150 | 11 | 16 | 30 | 12.5 | 0.9 | 1.3 | 2.5 | |
| Isaiah Joe | G | Arkansas | 2 | 2020–2022 | 96 | 992 | 92 | 55 | 351 | 10.3 | 1.0 | 0.6 | 3.7 | |
| Amir Johnson | F/C | Westchester HS (CA) | 2 | 2017–2019 | 125 | 1,700 | 477 | 178 | 543 | 13.6 | 3.8 | 1.4 | 4.3 | |
| Chris Johnson | G/F | Dayton | 1 | 2014–2015 | 9 | 187 | 26 | 3 | 54 | 20.8 | 2.9 | 0.3 | 6.0 | |
| Clemon Johnson | F/C | Florida A&M | 4 | 1982–1986 | 245 | 4,363 | 1,079 | 127 | 1,202 | 17.8 | 4.4 | 0.5 | 4.9 | |
| George Johnson | F/C | St. John's | 1 | 1984–1985 | 55 | 756 | 164 | 38 | 264 | 13.7 | 3.0 | 0.7 | 4.8 | |
| Ollie Johnson | F | Temple | 2 | 1980–1982 | 66 | 522 | 77 | 40 | 263 | 7.9 | 1.2 | 0.6 | 4.0 | |
| Reggie Johnson | F/C | Tennessee | 1 | 1982–1983 | 29 | 549 | 90 | 23 | 160 | 18.9 | 3.1 | 0.8 | 5.5 | |
| Tyler Johnson | G | Fresno State | 1 | 2021–2022 | 3 | 38 | 6 | 2 | 11 | 12.7 | 2.0 | 0.7 | 3.7 | |
| Darius Johnson-Odom | G | Marquette | 1 | 2013–2014 | 3 | 15 | 2 | 1 | 0 | 5.0 | 0.7 | 0.3 | 0.0 | |
| Alvin Jones | C | Georgia Tech | 1 | 2001–2002 | 23 | 126 | 36 | 3 | 26 | 5.5 | 1.6 | 0.1 | 1.1 | |
| Bobby Jones^ (#24) | F | North Carolina | 8 | 1978–1986 | 617 | 15,318 | 2,942 | 1,372 | 6,585 | 24.8 | 4.8 | 2.2 | 10.7 | |
| Bobby Jones | F | Washington | 1 | 2006–2007 | 44 | 336 | 57 | 16 | 110 | 7.6 | 1.3 | 0.4 | 2.5 | |
| Caldwell Jones | F/C | Albany State | 6 | 1976–1982 | 482 | 13,686 | 4,454 | 721 | 3,466 | 28.4 | 9.2 | 1.5 | 7.2 | |
| Charles Jones | F/C | Albany State | 1 | 1983–1984 | 1 | 3 | 0 | 0 | 1 | 3.0 | 0.0 | 0.0 | 1.0 | |
| Jake Jones | G | Assumption | 1 | 1971–1972 | 6 | 41 | 6 | 2 | 19 | 6.8 | 1.0 | 0.3 | 3.2 | |
| Jumaine Jones | F | Georgia | 2 | 1999–2001 | 98 | 1,004 | 227 | 37 | 361 | 10.2 | 2.3 | 0.4 | 3.7 | |
| Larry Jones | G/F | Toledo | 2 | 1964–1965; 1973–1974 | 95 | 2,235 | 241 | 270 | 854 | 23.5 | 2.5 | 2.8 | 9.0 | |
| Mason Jones | G | Arkansas | 1 | 2020–2021 | 6 | 27 | 4 | 3 | 16 | 4.5 | 0.7 | 0.5 | 2.7 | |
| Shelton Jones | F | St. John's | 1 | 1988–1989 | 42 | 577 | 95 | 33 | 212 | 13.7 | 2.3 | 0.8 | 5.0 | |
| Wali Jones | G | Villanova | 7 | 1965–1971; 1975–1976 | 454 | 11,702 | 1,150 | 1,548 | 5,229 | 25.8 | 2.5 | 3.4 | 11.5 | |
| DeAndre Jordan | C | Texas A&M | 1 | 2021–2022 | 16 | 214 | 92 | 8 | 74 | 13.4 | 5.8 | 0.5 | 4.6 | |
| Thomas Jordan | F/C | Oklahoma State | 1 | 1992–1993 | 4 | 106 | 19 | 3 | 44 | 26.5 | 4.8 | 0.8 | 11.0 | |
| Noble Jorgensen | C | Iowa | 3 | 1950–1953 | 177 | 2,673 | 750 | 203 | 1,347 | 19.7 | 4.2 | 1.1 | 7.6 | |

=== K to L ===
All-time roster
| Player | Pos. | Pre-draft team | Yrs | Seasons | Statistics | | | | | | | | | Ref. |
| Player | Pos. | Pre-draft team | Yrs | Seasons | GP | MP | REB | AST | PTS | MPG | RPG | APG | PPG | Ref. |
|---|---|---|---|---|---|---|---|---|---|---|---|---|---|---|
| Jason Kapono | F | UCLA | 2 | 2009–2011 | 81 | 1,088 | 77 | 43 | 340 | 13.4 | 1.0 | 0.5 | 4.2 | |
| Tommy Kearns | G | North Carolina | 1 | 1958–1959 | 1 | 7 | 0 | 0 | 2 | 7.0 | 0.0 | 0.0 | 2.0 | |
| Bill Kenville | G/F | St. Bonaventure | 3 | 1953–1956 | 214 | 4,063 | 709 | 431 | 1,467 | 19.0 | 3.3 | 2.0 | 6.9 | |
| Johnny Kerr^{+} | F/C | Illinois | 11 | 1954–1965 | 834 | 26,014 | 9,506 | 1,779 | 11,699 | 31.2 | 11.4 | 2.1 | 14.0 | |
| Braxton Key | F | Virginia | 1 | 2021–2022 | 2 | 6 | 2 | 1 | 2 | 3.0 | 1.0 | 0.5 | 1.0 | |
| Warren Kidd | F | Middle Tennessee | 1 | 1993–1994 | 68 | 884 | 233 | 19 | 247 | 13.0 | 3.4 | 0.3 | 3.6 | |
| Toby Kimball | F/C | UConn | 1 | 1973–1974 | 75 | 1,592 | 552 | 73 | 559 | 21.2 | 7.4 | 1.0 | 7.5 | |
| Albert King | G/F | Maryland | 1 | 1987–1988 | 72 | 1,593 | 216 | 109 | 517 | 22.1 | 3.0 | 1.5 | 7.2 | |
| Frankie King | G | Western Carolina | 1 | 1996–1997 | 7 | 59 | 14 | 5 | 20 | 8.4 | 2.0 | 0.7 | 2.9 | |
| George King | G | Charleston | 5 | 1951–1956 | 348 | 11,136 | 1,300 | 1,621 | 3,609 | 32.0 | 3.7 | 4.7 | 10.4 | |
| Louis King | F | Oregon | 1 | 2022–2023 | 1 | 29 | 4 | 2 | 20 | 29.0 | 4.0 | 2.0 | 20.0 | |
| Dick Knostman | C | Kansas State | 1 | 1953–1954 | 5 | 47 | 17 | 6 | 13 | 9.4 | 3.4 | 1.2 | 2.6 | |
| Furkan Korkmaz | G | (Turkey) Anadolu Efes | 7 | 2017–2024 | 328 | 5,447 | 646 | 391 | 2,244 | 16.6 | 2.0 | 1.2 | 6.8 | |
| Kyle Korver | G/F | Creighton | 5 | 2003–2008 | 337 | 9,057 | 1,092 | 523 | 3,527 | 26.9 | 3.2 | 1.6 | 10.5 | |
| Bruce Kuczenski | F | UConn | 1 | 1983–1984 | 3 | 40 | 6 | 2 | 3 | 13.3 | 2.0 | 0.7 | 1.0 | |
| Toni Kukoč^ | F | (Socialist Federal Republic of Yugoslavia) Jugoplastika | 2 | 1999–2001 | 80 | 1,895 | 305 | 234 | 784 | 23.7 | 3.8 | 2.9 | 9.8 | |
| Jim Lampley | C | Little Rock | 1 | 1986–1987 | 1 | 16 | 5 | 0 | 3 | 16.0 | 5.0 | 0.0 | 3.0 | |
| Carl Landry | F | Purdue | 1 | 2015–2016 | 36 | 569 | 146 | 32 | 351 | 15.8 | 4.1 | 0.9 | 9.8 | |
| Andrew Lang | C | Arkansas | 1 | 1992–1993 | 73 | 1,861 | 436 | 79 | 386 | 25.5 | 6.0 | 1.1 | 5.3 | |
| Antonio Lang | G/F | Duke | 1 | 1999–2000 | 3 | 6 | 0 | 1 | 3 | 2.0 | 0.0 | 0.3 | 1.0 | |
| Bob Lavoy | F/C | Western Kentucky | 1 | 1953–1954 | 60 | 1,152 | 287 | 68 | 323 | 19.2 | 4.8 | 1.1 | 5.4 | |
| Manny Leaks | F/C | Niagara | 1 | 1972–1973 | 82 | 2,530 | 677 | 95 | 898 | 30.9 | 8.3 | 1.2 | 11.0 | |
| Eric Leckner | F/C | Wyoming | 1 | 1993–1994 | 71 | 1,163 | 282 | 86 | 362 | 16.4 | 4.0 | 1.2 | 5.1 | |
| Clyde Lee | F/C | Vanderbilt | 2 | 1974–1976 | 150 | 3,700 | 1,140 | 156 | 724 | 24.7 | 7.6 | 1.0 | 4.8 | |
| Malcolm Lee | G | UCLA | 1 | 2014–2015 | 1 | 2 | 0 | 0 | 0 | 2.0 | 0.0 | 0.0 | 0.0 | |
| Saben Lee | G | Vanderbilt | 1 | 2022–2023 | 2 | 10 | 0 | 0 | 2 | 5.0 | 0.0 | 0.0 | 2.0 | |
| Andrew Levane | G/F | St. John's | 1 | 1949–1950 | 60 | | | 156 | 332 | | | 2.6 | 5.5 | |
| Earl Lloyd^ | F/C | West Virginia State | 6 | 1952–1958 | 413 | 11,071 | 2,740 | 620 | 3,432 | 26.8 | 6.6 | 1.5 | 8.3 | |
| Lewis Lloyd | G/F | Drake | 1 | 1989–1990 | 2 | 10 | 0 | 0 | 2 | 5.0 | 0.0 | 0.0 | 1.0 | |
| Bob Lochmueller | F | Louisville | 1 | 1952–1953 | 62 | 802 | 162 | 47 | 232 | 12.9 | 2.6 | 0.8 | 3.7 | |
| Don Lofgran | F/C | San Francisco | 1 | 1950–1951 | 47 | | | 29 | 162 | | | 0.6 | 3.4 | |
| Kenneth Lofton Jr. | F/C | Louisiana Tech | 1 | 2023–2024 | 2 | 9 | 3 | 0 | 2 | 4.5 | 1.5 | 0.0 | 1.0 | |
| Art Long | F | Cincinnati | 1 | 2002–2003 | 19 | 131 | 40 | 2 | 40 | 6.9 | 2.1 | 0.1 | 2.1 | |
| Shawn Long | F/C | Louisiana | 1 | 2016–2017 | 18 | 234 | 85 | 13 | 148 | 13.0 | 4.7 | 0.7 | 8.2 | |
| Kevin Loughery | G | St. John's | 2 | 1971–1973 | 106 | 2,684 | 291 | 336 | 1,377 | 25.3 | 2.7 | 3.2 | 13.0 | |
| Kyle Lowry | G | Villanova | 3 | 2023–2026 | 72 | 1,430 | 141 | 213 | 339 | 19.9 | 2.0 | 3.0 | 4.7 | |
| Timothé Luwawu-Cabarrot | F | (Serbia) Mega Leks | 2 | 2016–2018 | 121 | 1,997 | 221 | 129 | 744 | 16.5 | 1.8 | 1.1 | 6.1 | |
| George Lynch | F | North Carolina | 3 | 1998–2001 | 200 | 6,380 | 1,451 | 351 | 1,764 | 31.9 | 7.3 | 1.8 | 8.8 | |

=== M ===
All-time roster
| Player | Pos. | Pre-draft team | Yrs | Seasons | Statistics | | | | | | | | | Ref. |
| Player | Pos. | Pre-draft team | Yrs | Seasons | GP | MP | REB | AST | PTS | MPG | RPG | APG | PPG | Ref. |
|---|---|---|---|---|---|---|---|---|---|---|---|---|---|---|
| Todd MacCulloch | C | Washington | 3 | 1999–2001; 2002–2003 | 161 | 1,937 | 510 | 43 | 765 | 12.0 | 3.2 | 0.3 | 4.8 | |
| Shelvin Mack | G | Butler | 1 | 2012–2013 | 4 | 7 | 0 | 1 | 2 | 1.8 | 0.0 | 0.3 | 0.5 | |
| Johnny Macknowski | G/F | Seton Hall | 2 | 1949–1951 | 117 | | 110 | 134 | 823 | | 1.9 | 1.1 | 7.0 | |
| Don MacLean | F | UCLA | 1 | 1996–1997 | 37 | 733 | 140 | 37 | 402 | 19.8 | 3.8 | 1.0 | 10.9 | |
| Rick Mahorn | F/C | Hampton | 3 | 1989–1991; 1998–1999 | 171 | 4,837 | 1,212 | 218 | 1,535 | 28.3 | 7.1 | 1.3 | 9.0 | |
| Jeff Malone | G | Mississippi State | 3 | 1993–1996 | 71 | 1,970 | 171 | 107 | 959 | 27.7 | 2.4 | 1.5 | 13.5 | |
| Moses Malone^ (#2) | F/C | Petersburg HS (VA) | 5 | 1982–1986; 1993–1994 | 357 | 11,816 | 4,273 | 451 | 7,511 | 33.1 | 12.0 | 1.3 | 21.0 | |
| Boban Marjanović | C | (Serbia) Hemofarm | 1 | 2018–2019 | 22 | 305 | 113 | 32 | 180 | 13.9 | 5.1 | 1.5 | 8.2 | |
| Donyell Marshall | F | UConn | 1 | 2008–2009 | 25 | 189 | 40 | 15 | 94 | 7.6 | 1.6 | 0.6 | 3.8 | |
| Kendall Marshall | G | North Carolina | 1 | 2015–2016 | 30 | 400 | 28 | 73 | 111 | 13.3 | 0.9 | 2.4 | 3.7 | |
| Caleb Martin | F | Nevada | 1 | 2024–2025 | 31 | 943 | 136 | 69 | 281 | 30.4 | 4.4 | 2.2 | 9.1 | |
| KJ Martin | F | IMG Academy | 2 | 2023–2025 | 82 | 1,195 | 200 | 69 | 368 | 14.6 | 2.4 | 0.8 | 4.5 | |
| Tyrese Martin | G | UConn | 1 | 2025–2026 | 9 | 81 | 10 | 9 | 20 | 9.0 | 1.1 | 1.0 | 2.2 | |
| Al Masino | G | Canisius | 1 | 1953–1954 | 16 | 131 | 21 | 15 | 59 | 8.2 | 1.3 | 0.9 | 3.7 | |
| Tony Massenburg | F | Maryland | 1 | 1995–1996 | 30 | 804 | 186 | 12 | 296 | 26.8 | 6.2 | 0.4 | 9.9 | |
| Dakota Mathias | G | Purdue | 1 | 2020–2021 | 8 | 123 | 7 | 13 | 48 | 15.4 | 0.9 | 1.6 | 6.0 | |
| Wes Matthews | G | Wisconsin | 1 | 1983–1984 | 14 | 292 | 23 | 62 | 100 | 20.9 | 1.6 | 4.4 | 7.1 | |
| Tyrese Maxey* | G | Kentucky | 6 | 2020–2026 | 388 | 12,848 | 1,242 | 1,864 | 8,182 | 33.1 | 3.2 | 4.8 | 21.1 | |
| Vernon Maxwell | G | Florida | 2 | 1995–1996; 2000–2001 | 99 | 2,842 | 266 | 359 | 1,337 | 28.7 | 2.7 | 3.6 | 13.5 | |
| Don May | F | Dayton | 2 | 1972–1974 | 82 | 1,414 | 279 | 106 | 702 | 17.2 | 3.4 | 1.3 | 8.6 | |
| Tharon Mayes | G | Florida State | 1 | 1991–1992 | 21 | 215 | 15 | 32 | 90 | 10.2 | 0.7 | 1.5 | 4.3 | |
| Eric Maynor | G | VCU | 1 | 2013–2014 | 8 | 112 | 15 | 12 | 30 | 14.0 | 1.9 | 1.5 | 3.8 | |
| Luc Mbah a Moute | F | UCLA | 1 | 2014–2015 | 67 | 1,916 | 328 | 106 | 660 | 28.6 | 4.9 | 1.6 | 9.9 | |
| Bob McAdoo^ | F/C | North Carolina | 1 | 1985–1986 | 29 | 609 | 103 | 35 | 294 | 21.0 | 3.6 | 1.2 | 10.1 | |
| James Michael McAdoo | F | North Carolina | 1 | 2017–2018 | 3 | 18 | 2 | 0 | 8 | 6.0 | 0.7 | 0.0 | 2.7 | |
| Jared McCain | G | Duke | 2 | 2024–2026 | 60 | 1,212 | 131 | 122 | 597 | 20.2 | 2.2 | 2.0 | 10.0 | |
| Amal McCaskill | F/C | Marquette | 1 | 2003–2004 | 59 | 636 | 133 | 20 | 113 | 10.8 | 2.3 | 0.3 | 1.9 | |
| Ted McClain | G | Tennessee State | 1 | 1977–1978 | 29 | 293 | 37 | 34 | 91 | 10.1 | 1.3 | 1.2 | 3.1 | |
| Mac McClung | G | Texas Tech | 1 | 2022–2023 | 2 | 41 | 10 | 9 | 25 | 20.5 | 5.0 | 4.5 | 12.5 | |
| T. J. McConnell | G | Arizona | 4 | 2015–2019 | 314 | 6,915 | 901 | 1,462 | 2,010 | 22.0 | 2.9 | 4.7 | 6.4 | |
| Tim McCormick | C | Michigan | 2 | 1986–1988 | 104 | 3,418 | 755 | 140 | 1,212 | 32.9 | 7.3 | 1.3 | 11.7 | |
| Jalen McDaniels | F | San Diego State | 1 | 2022–2023 | 24 | 419 | 76 | 19 | 160 | 17.5 | 3.2 | 0.8 | 6.7 | |
| K. J. McDaniels | G/F | Clemson | 1 | 2014–2015 | 52 | 1,319 | 195 | 70 | 476 | 25.4 | 3.8 | 1.3 | 9.2 | |
| Ivan McFarlin | F | Oklahoma State | 1 | 2006–2007 | 11 | 41 | 11 | 1 | 15 | 3.7 | 1.0 | 0.1 | 1.4 | |
| JaVale McGee | C | Nevada | 1 | 2014–2015 | 6 | 61 | 13 | 2 | 18 | 10.2 | 2.2 | 0.3 | 3.0 | |
| George McGinnis^ | F/C | Indiana | 3 | 1975–1978 | 234 | 8,248 | 2,688 | 955 | 5,046 | 35.2 | 11.5 | 4.1 | 21.6 | |
| Derrick McKey | F/C | Alabama | 1 | 2001–2002 | 41 | 784 | 127 | 45 | 119 | 19.1 | 3.1 | 1.1 | 2.9 | |
| Aaron McKie | G | Temple | 8 | 1997–2005 | 536 | 13,721 | 1,827 | 1,609 | 4,143 | 25.6 | 3.4 | 3.0 | 7.7 | |
| Roshown McLeod | F | Duke | 1 | 2000–2001 | 1 | 15 | 2 | 0 | 2 | 15.0 | 2.0 | 0.0 | 2.0 | |
| Mark McNamara | F/C | California | 3 | 1982–1983; 1986–1988 | 89 | 876 | 269 | 27 | 265 | 9.8 | 3.0 | 0.3 | 3.0 | |
| Jodie Meeks | G | Kentucky | 3 | 2009–2012 | 159 | 3,939 | 359 | 149 | 1,442 | 24.8 | 2.3 | 0.9 | 9.1 | |
| Bill Melchionni | G | Villanova | 2 | 1966–1968 | 144 | 1,450 | 202 | 203 | 640 | 10.1 | 1.4 | 1.4 | 4.4 | |
| De'Anthony Melton | G | USC | 2 | 2022–2024 | 115 | 3,173 | 453 | 311 | 1,201 | 27.6 | 3.9 | 2.7 | 10.4 | |
| Porter Meriwether | G | Tennessee State | 1 | 1962–1963 | 31 | 268 | 29 | 43 | 119 | 8.6 | 0.9 | 1.4 | 3.8 | |
| Andre Miller | G | Utah | 3 | 2006–2009 | 221 | 8,136 | 940 | 1,515 | 3,510 | 36.8 | 4.3 | 6.9 | 15.9 | |
| Anthony Miller | F | Michigan State | 1 | 2000–2001 | 1 | 2 | 0 | 0 | 0 | 2.0 | 0.0 | 0.0 | 0.0 | |
| Paul Millsap | F | Louisiana Tech | 1 | 2021–2022 | 9 | 106 | 25 | 5 | 33 | 11.8 | 2.8 | 0.6 | 3.7 | |
| Shake Milton | G | SMU | 5 | 2018–2023 | 254 | 5,280 | 604 | 694 | 2,368 | 20.8 | 2.4 | 2.7 | 9.3 | |
| Steve Mix^{+} | F | Toledo | 9 | 1973–1982 | 668 | 16,907 | 3,771 | 1,270 | 7,559 | 25.3 | 5.6 | 1.9 | 11.3 | |
| Isaiah Mobley | F | USC | 1 | 2024–2025 | 1 | 17 | 4 | 5 | 6 | 17.0 | 4.0 | 5.0 | 6.0 | |
| Nazr Mohammed | C | Kentucky | 3 | 1998–2001 | 84 | 507 | 142 | 6 | 192 | 6.0 | 1.7 | 0.1 | 2.3 | |
| Eric Money | G | Arizona | 2 | 1978–1980 | 29 | 627 | 44 | 98 | 302 | 21.6 | 1.5 | 3.4 | 10.4 | |
| Greg Monroe | F/C | Georgetown | 1 | 2018–2019 | 3 | 52 | 13 | 7 | 41 | 17.3 | 4.3 | 2.3 | 13.7 | |
| Eric Montross | C | North Carolina | 1 | 1997–1998 | 20 | 337 | 92 | 7 | 67 | 16.9 | 4.6 | 0.4 | 3.4 | |
| Jackie Moore | F | La Salle | 1 | 1954–1955 | 1 | 5 | 1 | 0 | 2 | 5.0 | 1.0 | 0.0 | 2.0 | |
| Darius Morris | G | Michigan | 1 | 2013–2014 | 12 | 193 | 13 | 31 | 83 | 16.1 | 1.1 | 2.6 | 6.9 | |
| Marcus Morris | F | Kansas | 1 | 2023–2024 | 37 | 637 | 109 | 26 | 247 | 17.2 | 2.9 | 0.7 | 6.7 | |
| Glenn Mosley | F | Seton Hall | 1 | 1977–1978 | 6 | 21 | 5 | 2 | 13 | 3.5 | 0.8 | 0.3 | 2.2 | |
| Perry Moss | G | Northeastern | 1 | 1985–1986 | 60 | 852 | 90 | 89 | 249 | 14.2 | 1.5 | 1.5 | 4.2 | |
| Arnett Moultrie | F | Mississippi State | 2 | 2012–2014 | 59 | 729 | 180 | 12 | 210 | 12.4 | 3.1 | 0.2 | 3.6 | |
| Byron Mullens | C | Ohio State | 1 | 2013–2014 | 18 | 247 | 60 | 8 | 122 | 13.7 | 3.3 | 0.4 | 6.8 | |
| Mike Muscala | F/C | Bucknell | 1 | 2018–2019 | 47 | 1,041 | 200 | 62 | 349 | 22.1 | 4.3 | 1.3 | 7.4 | |
| Dikembe Mutombo^ | C | Georgetown | 2 | 2000–2002 | 106 | 3,782 | 1,185 | 105 | 1,224 | 35.7 | 11.2 | 1.0 | 11.5 | |
| Pete Myers | G/F | Little Rock | 1 | 1988–1989 | 4 | 40 | 10 | 2 | 14 | 10.0 | 2.5 | 0.5 | 3.5 | |

=== N to P ===
All-time roster
| Player | Pos. | Pre-draft team | Yrs | Seasons | Statistics | | | | | | | | | Ref. |
| Player | Pos. | Pre-draft team | Yrs | Seasons | GP | MP | REB | AST | PTS | MPG | RPG | APG | PPG | Ref. |
|---|---|---|---|---|---|---|---|---|---|---|---|---|---|---|
| Lee Nailon | F | TCU | 1 | 2005–2006 | 22 | 237 | 42 | 7 | 93 | 10.8 | 1.9 | 0.3 | 4.2 | |
| Pete Nance | F/C | North Carolina | 1 | 2024–2025 | 7 | 68 | 10 | 3 | 15 | 9.7 | 1.4 | 0.4 | 2.1 | |
| Jim Neal | C | Wofford | 1 | 1953–1954 | 67 | 899 | 257 | 24 | 312 | 13.4 | 3.8 | 0.4 | 4.7 | |
| Raul Neto | G | (Spain) Gipuzkoa | 1 | 2019–2020 | 54 | 668 | 61 | 95 | 275 | 12.4 | 1.1 | 1.8 | 5.1 | |
| Paul Neumann | G | Stanford | 4 | 1961–1965 | 271 | 5,919 | 742 | 833 | 2,564 | 21.8 | 2.7 | 3.1 | 9.5 | |
| Georges Niang | F | Iowa State | 2 | 2021–2023 | 154 | 3,248 | 388 | 179 | 1,337 | 21.1 | 2.5 | 1.2 | 8.7 | |
| Kurt Nimphius | F/C | Arizona State | 1 | 1989–1990 | 38 | 314 | 61 | 6 | 90 | 8.3 | 1.6 | 0.2 | 2.4 | |
| Andrés Nocioni | F | (Spain) Tau Cerámica | 2 | 2010–2012 | 65 | 987 | 183 | 46 | 344 | 15.2 | 2.8 | 0.7 | 5.3 | |
| Nerlens Noel | F/C | Kentucky | 3 | 2014–2017 | 171 | 4,840 | 1,297 | 280 | 1,748 | 28.3 | 7.6 | 1.6 | 10.2 | |
| Coniel Norman | G | Arizona | 2 | 1974–1976 | 77 | 890 | 113 | 70 | 434 | 11.6 | 1.5 | 0.9 | 5.6 | |
| Mike Novak | F/C | Loyola (IL) | 1 | 1953–1954 | 5 | 24 | 2 | 2 | 1 | 4.8 | 0.4 | 0.4 | 0.2 | |
| James Nunnally | F | UC Santa Barbara | 1 | 2013–2014 | 9 | 111 | 11 | 6 | 26 | 12.3 | 1.2 | 0.7 | 2.9 | |
| Kyle O'Quinn | F/C | Norfolk State | 1 | 2019–2020 | 29 | 313 | 116 | 51 | 102 | 10.8 | 4.0 | 1.8 | 3.5 | |
| Bud Ogden | F | Santa Clara | 2 | 1969–1971 | 74 | 490 | 106 | 48 | 257 | 6.6 | 1.4 | 0.6 | 3.5 | |
| Jahlil Okafor | F/C | Duke | 3 | 2015–2018 | 105 | 2,750 | 622 | 124 | 1,528 | 26.2 | 5.9 | 1.2 | 14.6 | |
| Chuma Okeke | F | Auburn | 1 | 2024–2025 | 7 | 171 | 43 | 13 | 48 | 24.4 | 6.1 | 1.9 | 6.9 | |
| Brian Oliver | G | Georgia Tech | 2 | 1990–1992 | 107 | 1,079 | 110 | 108 | 360 | 10.1 | 1.0 | 1.0 | 3.4 | |
| Kevin Ollie | G | UConn | 6 | 1999–2001; 2004–2008 | 280 | 3,500 | 313 | 455 | 755 | 12.5 | 1.1 | 1.6 | 2.7 | |
| Daniel Orton | F/C | Kentucky | 1 | 2013–2014 | 22 | 251 | 61 | 15 | 65 | 11.4 | 2.8 | 0.7 | 3.0 | |
| Chuck Osborne | F | Western Kentucky | 1 | 1961–1962 | 4 | 21 | 9 | 1 | 5 | 5.3 | 2.3 | 0.3 | 1.3 | |
| Wally Osterkorn | F/C | Illinois | 4 | 1951–1955 | 204 | 5,187 | 1,218 | 346 | 1,436 | 25.4 | 6.0 | 1.7 | 7.0 | |
| Kelly Oubre Jr. | F | Kansas | 3 | 2023–2026 | 178 | 5,707 | 961 | 289 | 2,660 | 32.1 | 5.4 | 1.6 | 14.9 | |
| Doug Overton | G | La Salle | 3 | 1996–1999 | 94 | 948 | 84 | 142 | 289 | 10.1 | 0.9 | 1.5 | 3.1 | |
| Billy Owens | G/F | Syracuse | 1 | 1999–2000 | 46 | 919 | 192 | 59 | 271 | 20.0 | 4.2 | 1.3 | 5.9 | |
| Togo Palazzi | G/F | Holy Cross | 4 | 1956–1960 | 187 | 2,904 | 710 | 153 | 1,655 | 15.5 | 3.8 | 0.8 | 8.9 | |
| Jeremy Pargo | G | Gonzaga | 1 | 2012–2013 | 14 | 208 | 17 | 28 | 69 | 14.9 | 1.2 | 2.0 | 4.9 | |
| Anthony Parker | G | Bradley | 2 | 1997–1999 | 39 | 199 | 26 | 19 | 74 | 5.1 | 0.7 | 0.5 | 1.9 | |
| Justin Patton | C | Creighton | 1 | 2018–2019 | 3 | 21 | 6 | 3 | 5 | 7.0 | 2.0 | 1.0 | 1.7 | |
| Cameron Payne | G | Murray State | 2 | 2023–2024; 2025–2026 | 53 | 976 | 99 | 154 | 450 | 18.4 | 1.9 | 2.9 | 8.5 | |
| Kenny Payne | G/F | Louisville | 4 | 1989–1993 | 144 | 1,167 | 170 | 61 | 508 | 8.1 | 1.8 | 3.1 | 3.5 | |
| Norvel Pelle | C | Price HS (CA) | 1 | 2019–2020 | 24 | 232 | 72 | 8 | 57 | 9.7 | 3.0 | .3 | 2.4 | |
| Tim Perry | F/C | Temple | 4 | 1992–1996 | 211 | 4,973 | 915 | 234 | 1,545 | 23.6 | 4.3 | 1.1 | 7.3 | |
| Ed Peterson | C | Cornell | 2 | 1949–1951 | 79 | | 38 | 41 | 525 | | 2.2 | 0.5 | 6.6 | |
| Filip Petrušev | F/C | Gonzaga | 1 | 2023–2024 | 1 | 3 | 1 | 0 | 0 | 3.0 | 1.0 | 0.0 | 0.0 | |
| Ed Pinckney | F | Villanova | 1 | 1995–1996 | 27 | 679 | 176 | 22 | 150 | 25.1 | 6.5 | 0.8 | 5.6 | |
| Vincent Poirier | C | (France) Paris-Levallois | 1 | 2020–2021 | 10 | 39 | 14 | 2 | 8 | 3.9 | 1.4 | 0.2 | 0.8 | |
| Myles Powell | G | Seton Hall | 1 | 2021–2022 | 11 | 52 | 6 | 3 | 13 | 4.7 | 0.5 | 0.3 | 1.2 | |
| Alex Poythress | F | Kentucky | 1 | 2016–2017 | 6 | 157 | 29 | 5 | 64 | 26.2 | 4.8 | 0.8 | 10.7 | |
| Phil Pressey | G | Missouri | 1 | 2015–2016 | 14 | 170 | 23 | 46 | 55 | 12.1 | 1.6 | 3.3 | 3.9 | |
| Mike Price | G | Illinois | 1 | 1972–1973 | 57 | 751 | 117 | 71 | 288 | 13.2 | 2.1 | 1.2 | 5.1 | |
| Kevin Pritchard | G | Kansas | 1 | 1994–1995 | 5 | 36 | 1 | 11 | 1 | 7.2 | 0.2 | 2.2 | 0.2 | |
| Jacob Pullen | G | Kansas State | 1 | 2017–2018 | 3 | 6 | 0 | 0 | 2 | 2.0 | 0.0 | 0.0 | 0.7 | |

=== Q to R ===
All-time roster
| Player | Pos. | Pre-draft team | Yrs | Seasons | Statistics | | | | | | | | | Ref. |
| Player | Pos. | Pre-draft team | Yrs | Seasons | GP | MP | REB | AST | PTS | MPG | RPG | APG | PPG | Ref. |
|---|---|---|---|---|---|---|---|---|---|---|---|---|---|---|
| Lester Quiñones | G | Memphis | 1 | 2024–2025 | 4 | 17 | 4 | 1 | 9 | 4.3 | 1.0 | 0.3 | 2.3 | |
| Luther Rackley | C | Xavier | 1 | 1973–1974 | 9 | 68 | 22 | 0 | 18 | 7.6 | 2.4 | 0.0 | 2.0 | |
| Cal Ramsey | F | NYU | 1 | 1960–1961 | 2 | 27 | 7 | 3 | 6 | 13.5 | 3.5 | 1.5 | 3.0 | |
| Chasson Randle | G | Stanford | 1 | 2016–2017 | 8 | 74 | 5 | 6 | 42 | 9.3 | 0.6 | 0.8 | 5.3 | |
| Shavlik Randolph | F | Duke | 3 | 2005–2008 | 79 | 693 | 198 | 26 | 197 | 8.8 | 2.5 | 0.3 | 2.5 | |
| George Ratkovicz | F/C | Lindblom Academy (IL) | 3 | 1949–1952 | 194 | 1,356 | 875 | 407 | 1,877 | 20.5 | 6.6 | 2.1 | 9.7 | |
| Theo Ratliff^{+} | F/C | Wyoming | 5 | 1997–2001; 2008–2009 | 261 | 7,662 | 1,809 | 175 | 2,598 | 29.4 | 6.9 | 0.7 | 10.0 | |
| Leo Rautins | F | Syracuse | 1 | 1983–1984 | 28 | 196 | 33 | 29 | 48 | 7.0 | 1.2 | 1.0 | 1.7 | |
| Jim Ray | G | Toledo | 2 | 1956–1957; 1959–1960 | 8 | 64 | 5 | 5 | 9 | 8.0 | 0.6 | 0.6 | 1.1 | |
| Craig Raymond | C | BYU | 1 | 1968–1969 | 27 | 177 | 68 | 8 | 55 | 6.6 | 2.5 | 0.3 | 2.0 | |
| JJ Redick | G | Duke | 2 | 2017–2019 | 146 | 4,495 | 364 | 416 | 2,570 | 30.8 | 2.5 | 2.8 | 17.6 | |
| Marlon Redmond | G | San Francisco | 1 | 1978–1979 | 4 | 23 | 1 | 1 | 2 | 5.8 | 0.3 | 0.3 | 0.5 | |
| Paul Reed | F/C | DePaul | 4 | 2020–2024 | 215 | 2,824 | 903 | 164 | 1,091 | 13.1 | 4.2 | 0.8 | 5.1 | |
| Alex Reese | F | Alabama | 1 | 2024–2025 | 14 | 214 | 46 | 4 | 74 | 15.3 | 3.3 | 0.3 | 5.3 | |
| Jim Reid | F | Winston-Salem State | 1 | 1967–1968 | 6 | 52 | 11 | 3 | 21 | 8.7 | 1.8 | 0.5 | 3.5 | |
| Robert Reid | G/F | St. Mary's (TX) | 1 | 1990–1991 | 3 | 37 | 9 | 4 | 4 | 12.3 | 3.0 | 1.3 | 1.3 | |
| Efthimios Rentzias | C | (Greece) PAOK Thessaloniki | 1 | 2002–2003 | 35 | 144 | 26 | 7 | 52 | 4.1 | 0.7 | 0.2 | 1.5 | |
| Clint Richardson | G | Seattle | 6 | 1979–1985 | 426 | 8,198 | 984 | 848 | 2,789 | 19.2 | 2.3 | 2.0 | 6.5 | |
| Jason Richardson | G | Michigan State | 2 | 2012–2013; 2014–2015 | 52 | 1,352 | 193 | 89 | 519 | 26.0 | 3.7 | 1.7 | 10.0 | |
| Josh Richardson | G | Tennessee | 1 | 2019–2020 | 55 | 1,693 | 133 | 162 | 755 | 30.8 | 3.2 | 2.9 | 13.7 | |
| Joe Roberts | F | Ohio State | 3 | 1960–1963 | 181 | 2,908 | 936 | 109 | 1,118 | 16.1 | 5.2 | 0.6 | 6.2 | |
| Stanley Roberts | C | LSU | 1 | 1999–2000 | 5 | 51 | 15 | 3 | 10 | 10.2 | 3.0 | 0.6 | 2.0 | |
| Cliff Robinson | F | USC | 3 | 1986–1989 | 131 | 4,112 | 787 | 252 | 2,205 | 31.4 | 6.0 | 1.9 | 16.8 | |
| Glenn Robinson | F | Purdue | 1 | 2003–2004 | 42 | 1,336 | 189 | 57 | 698 | 31.8 | 4.5 | 1.4 | 16.6 | |
| Glenn Robinson III | G/F | Michigan | 1 | 2014–2015; 2019–2020 | 24 | 423 | 69 | 19 | 152 | 17.6 | 2.9 | 0.8 | 6.3 | |
| Thomas Robinson | F | Kansas | 1 | 2014–2015 | 22 | 407 | 170 | 24 | 193 | 18.5 | 7.7 | 1.1 | 8.8 | |
| Red Rocha^{+} | F/C | Oregon State | 4 | 1951–1953; 1954–1956 | 279 | 9,353 | 1,964 | 574 | 3,156 | 33.5 | 7.0 | 2.1 | 11.3 | |
| David Roddy | F | Colorado State | 1 | 2024–2025 | 3 | 29 | 9 | 3 | 18 | 9.7 | 3.0 | 1.0 | 6.0 | |
| Sergio Rodríguez | G | (Spain) Estudiantes | 1 | 2016–2017 | 68 | 1,518 | 157 | 344 | 530 | 22.3 | 2.3 | 5.1 | 7.8 | |
| Rodney Rogers | F | Wake Forest | 1 | 2004–2005 | 28 | 485 | 104 | 26 | 169 | 17.3 | 3.7 | 0.9 | 6.0 | |
| Jim Rowinski | F/C | Purdue | 1 | 1988–1989 | 3 | 7 | 3 | 0 | 3 | 2.3 | 1.0 | 0.0 | 1.0 | |
| Michael Ruffin | F | Tulsa | 1 | 2001–2002 | 15 | 169 | 51 | 5 | 16 | 11.3 | 3.4 | 0.3 | 1.1 | |
| Trevor Ruffin | G | Hawaii | 1 | 1995–1996 | 61 | 1,551 | 132 | 269 | 778 | 25.4 | 2.2 | 4.4 | 12.8 | |
| Jeff Ruland | F/C | Iona | 2 | 1986–1987; 1991–1992 | 18 | 325 | 75 | 15 | 98 | 18.1 | 4.2 | 0.8 | 5.4 | |
| Bob Rule | F/C | Colorado State | 2 | 1971–1973 | 63 | 1,999 | 481 | 111 | 1,035 | 31.7 | 7.6 | 1.8 | 16.4 | |
| Kareem Rush | G | Missouri | 1 | 2008–2009 | 25 | 199 | 15 | 15 | 54 | 8.0 | 0.6 | 0.6 | 2.2 | |

=== S ===
All-time roster
| Player | Pos. | Pre-draft team | Yrs | Seasons | Statistics | | | | | | | | | Ref. |
| Player | Pos. | Pre-draft team | Yrs | Seasons | GP | MP | REB | AST | PTS | MPG | RPG | APG | PPG | Ref. |
|---|---|---|---|---|---|---|---|---|---|---|---|---|---|---|
| Hunter Sallis | G | Wake Forest | 1 | 2025–2026 | 7 | 26 | 1 | 4 | 7 | 3.7 | 0.1 | 0.6 | 1.0 | |
| John Salmons | G | Miami (FL) | 4 | 2002–2006 | 281 | 5,159 | 596 | 518 | 1,430 | 18.4 | 2.1 | 1.8 | 5.1 | |
| JaKarr Sampson | G/F | St. John's | 2 | 2014–2016 | 121 | 1,822 | 292 | 107 | 626 | 15.1 | 2.4 | 0.9 | 5.2 | |
| Pepe Sánchez | G | Temple | 1 | 2000–2001 | 24 | 116 | 14 | 36 | 20 | 4.8 | 0.6 | 1.5 | 0.8 | |
| Dario Šarić | F | (Croatia) Cibona | 3 | 2016–2019 | 172 | 4,835 | 1,119 | 410 | 2,325 | 28.1 | 6.5 | 2.4 | 13.5 | |
| Kenny Satterfield | G | Cincinnati | 1 | 2002–2003 | 17 | 82 | 8 | 15 | 9 | 4.8 | 0.5 | 0.9 | 0.5 | |
| Don Savage | G/F | Le Moyne | 2 | 1951–1952; 1956–1957 | 17 | 173 | 31 | 14 | 54 | 10.2 | 1.8 | 0.8 | 3.2 | |
| Bob Schafer | G | Villanova | 1 | 1956–1957 | 11 | 167 | 11 | 15 | 49 | 15.2 | 1.0 | 1.4 | 4.5 | |
| Dolph Schayes^ (#4) | F/C | NYU | 15 | 1949–1964 | 996 | 29,800 | 11,256 | 3,072 | 18,438 | 34.4 | 12.1 | 3.1 | 18.5 | |
| Dale Schlueter | C | Colorado State | 1 | 1972–1973 | 78 | 1,136 | 354 | 103 | 418 | 14.6 | 4.5 | 1.3 | 5.4 | |
| Russ Schoene | F/C | Chattanooga | 1 | 1982–1983 | 46 | 702 | 154 | 32 | 233 | 15.3 | 3.3 | 0.7 | 5.1 | |
| Dave Scholz | F | Illinois | 1 | 1969–1970 | 1 | 1 | 0 | 0 | 2 | 1.0 | 0.0 | 0.0 | 2.0 | |
| Fred Scolari | G | San Francisco | 1 | 1950–1951 | 31 | | | 127 | 368 | | | 4.1 | 11.9 | |
| Mike Scott | F | Virginia | 3 | 2018–2021 | 146 | 2,706 | 470 | 118 | 832 | 18.5 | 3.2 | 0.8 | 5.7 | |
| Frank Selvy | G/F | Furman | 1 | 1959–1960 | 19 | 217 | 48 | 30 | 103 | 11.4 | 2.5 | 1.6 | 5.4 | |
| Paul Seymour^{+} | G/F | Toledo | 11 | 1949–1960 | 600 | 14,667 | 1,694 | 2,335 | 5,760 | 30.1 | 3.1 | 3.9 | 9.6 | |
| Charles Shackleford | F/C | NC State | 2 | 1991–1993 | 120 | 1,967 | 620 | 72 | 664 | 16.4 | 5.2 | 0.6 | 5.5 | |
| Lee Shaffer^{+} | F | North Carolina | 3 | 1961–1964 | 196 | 5,488 | 1,240 | 232 | 3,291 | 28.0 | 6.3 | 1.2 | 16.8 | |
| Landry Shamet | G | Wichita State | 1 | 2018–2019 | 54 | 1,108 | 78 | 59 | 449 | 20.5 | 1.4 | 1.1 | 8.3 | |
| Brian Shaw | G | UC Santa Barbara | 1 | 1997–1998 | 20 | 502 | 64 | 88 | 121 | 25.1 | 3.2 | 4.4 | 6.1 | |
| Casey Shaw | C | Toledo | 1 | 1998–1999 | 9 | 14 | 3 | 0 | 2 | 1.6 | 0.3 | 0.0 | 0.2 | |
| Marial Shayok | G/F | Iowa State | 1 | 2019–2020 | 4 | 28 | 7 | 1 | 11 | 7.0 | 1.8 | 0.3 | 2.8 | |
| Dexter Shouse | G | South Alabama | 1 | 1989–1990 | 3 | 18 | 0 | 2 | 0 | 6.0 | 0.0 | 0.7 | 0.0 | |
| Alexey Shved | G | (Russia) CSKA Moscow | 1 | 2014–2015 | 17 | 285 | 22 | 46 | 169 | 16.8 | 1.3 | 2.7 | 9.9 | |
| Xavier Silas | G | Northern Illinois | 1 | 2011–2012 | 2 | 39 | 4 | 3 | 11 | 19.5 | 2.0 | 1.5 | 5.5 | |
| Ben Simmons^{+} | G/F | LSU | 4 | 2017–2021 | 275 | 9,326 | 2,217 | 2,127 | 4,382 | 33.9 | 8.1 | 7.7 | 15.9 | |
| Connie Simmons | F/C | Flushing HS (NY) | 1 | 1954–1955 | | | | | | | | | | |
| Jonathon Simmons | G/F | Houston | 1 | 2018–2019 | 15 | 219 | 26 | 33 | 83 | 14.6 | 1.7 | 2.2 | 5.5 | |
| Ralph Simpson | G/F | Michigan State | 1 | 1978–1979 | 37 | 452 | 35 | 58 | 202 | 12.2 | 0.9 | 1.6 | 5.5 | |
| Henry Sims | C | Georgetown | 2 | 2013–2015 | 99 | 2,106 | 540 | 126 | 892 | 21.3 | 5.5 | 1.3 | 9.0 | |
| Scott Skiles | G | Michigan State | 1 | 1995–1996 | 10 | 236 | 16 | 38 | 63 | 23.6 | 1.6 | 3.8 | 6.3 | |
| Al Skinner | G | UMass | 2 | 1978–1980 | 24 | 319 | 44 | 42 | 101 | 13.3 | 1.8 | 1.8 | 4.2 | |
| Brian Skinner | F | Baylor | 2 | 2002–2003; 2004–2005 | 101 | 1,627 | 428 | 24 | 510 | 16.1 | 4.2 | 0.2 | 5.0 | |
| Javonte Smart | G | LSU | 1 | 2023–2024 | 1 | 1 | 0 | 0 | 0 | 1.0 | 0.0 | 0.0 | 0.0 | |
| Belus Smawley | G/F | Appalachian State | 1 | 1950–1951 | 16 | | 48 | 36 | 124 | | 3.0 | 2.3 | 7.8 | |
| Derek Smith | G/F | Louisville | 2 | 1988–1990 | 111 | 2,100 | 258 | 177 | 947 | 18.9 | 2.3 | 1.6 | 8.5 | |
| Don Smith | G | Dayton | 1 | 1974–1975 | 54 | 538 | 30 | 47 | 283 | 10.0 | 0.6 | 0.9 | 5.2 | |
| Ish Smith | G | Wake Forest | 2 | 2014–2016 | 75 | 2,299 | 286 | 500 | 1,034 | 30.7 | 3.8 | 6.7 | 13.8 | |
| Jabari Smith | C | LSU | 1 | 2001–2002 | 11 | 110 | 14 | 5 | 55 | 10.0 | 1.3 | 0.5 | 5.0 | |
| Jason Smith | F/C | Colorado State | 2 | 2007–2008; 2009–2010 | 132 | 1,765 | 365 | 53 | 529 | 13.4 | 2.8 | 0.4 | 4.0 | |
| Joe Smith | F | Maryland | 2 | 1997–1998; 2006–2007 | 84 | 2,054 | 493 | 73 | 806 | 24.5 | 5.9 | 0.9 | 9.6 | |
| Steven Smith | F | La Salle | 1 | 2006–2007 | 8 | 28 | 6 | 0 | 5 | 3.5 | 0.8 | 0.0 | 0.6 | |
| Terquavion Smith | G | NC State | 1 | 2023–2024 | 16 | 84 | 4 | 12 | 52 | 5.3 | 0.3 | 0.8 | 3.3 | |
| Zhaire Smith | G | Texas Tech | 2 | 2018–2020 | 13 | 143 | 15 | 12 | 48 | 11.0 | 1.2 | 0.9 | 3.7 | |
| Eric Snow | G | Michigan State | 7 | 1997–2004 | 452 | 15,465 | 1,463 | 2,965 | 4,375 | 34.2 | 3.2 | 6.6 | 9.7 | |
| Darius Songaila | F | Wake Forest | 1 | 2010–2011 | 10 | 71 | 10 | 2 | 16 | 7.1 | 1.0 | 0.2 | 1.6 | |
| Dave Sorenson | F | Ohio State | 1 | 1972–1973 | 48 | 626 | 173 | 31 | 285 | 13.0 | 3.6 | 0.6 | 5.9 | |
| Jim Spanarkel | G/F | Duke | 1 | 1979–1980 | 40 | 442 | 54 | 51 | 198 | 11.1 | 1.4 | 1.3 | 5.0 | |
| Marreese Speights | F/C | Florida | 3 | 2008–2011 | 205 | 3,013 | 755 | 96 | 1,484 | 14.7 | 3.7 | 0.5 | 7.2 | |
| Tiago Splitter | F/C | (Spain) Saski Baskonia | 1 | 2016–2017 | 8 | 76 | 22 | 4 | 39 | 9.5 | 2.8 | 0.5 | 4.9 | |
| Jaden Springer | G | Tennessee | 3 | 2021–2024 | 50 | 472 | 74 | 43 | 172 | 9.4 | 1.5 | 0.9 | 3.4 | |
| Jerry Stackhouse | G/F | North Carolina | 3 | 1995–1998 | 175 | 6,615 | 679 | 598 | 3,416 | 37.8 | 3.9 | 3.4 | 19.5 | |
| Nik Stauskas | G | Michigan | 3 | 2015–2018 | 159 | 4,042 | 410 | 327 | 1,377 | 25.4 | 2.6 | 2.1 | 8.7 | |
| Kebu Stewart | F | Cal State Bakersfield | 1 | 1997–1998 | 15 | 110 | 31 | 2 | 40 | 7.3 | 2.1 | 0.1 | 2.7 | |
| Greg Stokes | F/C | Iowa | 1 | 1985–1986 | 31 | 350 | 57 | 17 | 126 | 11.3 | 1.8 | 0.5 | 4.1 | |
| Greg Sutton | G | Oral Roberts | 1 | 1995–1996 | 30 | 465 | 35 | 63 | 190 | 15.5 | 1.2 | 2.1 | 6.3 | |

=== T to V ===
All-time roster
| Player | Pos. | Pre-draft team | Yrs | Seasons | Statistics | | | | | | | | | Ref. |
| Player | Pos. | Pre-draft team | Yrs | Seasons | GP | MP | REB | AST | PTS | MPG | RPG | APG | PPG | Ref. |
|---|---|---|---|---|---|---|---|---|---|---|---|---|---|---|
| Dalen Terry | G | Arizona | 1 | 2025–2026 | 14 | 174 | 22 | 23 | 58 | 12.4 | 1.6 | 1.6 | 4.1 | |
| Adonis Thomas | F | Memphis | 1 | 2013–2014 | 2 | 13 | 0 | 1 | 7 | 6.5 | 0.0 | 0.5 | 3.5 | |
| James Thomas | F | Texas | 1 | 2005–2006 | 15 | 124 | 31 | 1 | 22 | 8.3 | 2.1 | 0.1 | 1.5 | |
| Kenny Thomas | F | New Mexico | 3 | 2002–2005 | 167 | 5,435 | 1,450 | 261 | 2,006 | 32.5 | 8.7 | 1.6 | 12.0 | |
| Malcolm Thomas | F | San Diego State | 1 | 2014–2015 | 17 | 194 | 56 | 7 | 45 | 11.4 | 3.3 | 0.4 | 2.6 | |
| Tim Thomas | F | Villanova | 2 | 1997–1999 | 94 | 1,967 | 321 | 105 | 923 | 20.9 | 3.4 | 1.1 | 9.8 | |
| Hollis Thompson | G/F | Georgetown | 4 | 2013–2017 | 256 | 6,233 | 801 | 283 | 2,016 | 24.3 | 3.1 | 1.1 | 7.9 | |
| LaSalle Thompson | F/C | Texas | 1 | 1995–1996 | 44 | 773 | 199 | 26 | 85 | 17.6 | 4.5 | 0.6 | 1.9 | |
| Paul Thompson | G/F | Tulane | 1 | 1985–1986 | 23 | 432 | 63 | 24 | 179 | 18.8 | 2.7 | 1.0 | 7.8 | |
| Bob Thornton | F/C | UC Irvine | 3 | 1987–1990 | 151 | 1,549 | 324 | 43 | 397 | 10.3 | 2.1 | 0.3 | 2.6 | |
| Sedale Threatt | G | West Virginia Tech | 4 | 1983–1987 | 225 | 4,190 | 317 | 491 | 1,555 | 18.6 | 1.4 | 2.2 | 6.9 | |
| Matisse Thybulle | G/F | Washington | 4 | 2019–2023 | 245 | 4,861 | 445 | 240 | 1,069 | 19.8 | 1.8 | 1.0 | 4.4 | |
| Anthony Tolliver | F | Creighton | 1 | 2020–2021 | 11 | 99 | 10 | 2 | 17 | 9.0 | 0.9 | 0.2 | 1.5 | |
| Andrew Toney^{+} | G | Louisiana | 8 | 1980–1988 | 468 | 12,608 | 1,009 | 1,965 | 7,458 | 26.9 | 2.2 | 4.2 | 15.9 | |
| Bernard Toone | F | Marquette | 1 | 1979–1980 | 23 | 124 | 34 | 12 | 55 | 5.4 | 1.5 | 0.5 | 2.4 | |
| John Trapp | F | UNLV | 1 | 1972–1973 | 39 | 854 | 186 | 47 | 419 | 21.9 | 4.8 | 1.2 | 10.7 | |
| John Tschogl | F | UC Santa Barbara | 1 | 1974–1975 | 39 | 623 | 111 | 30 | 119 | 16.0 | 2.8 | 0.8 | 3.1 | |
| Jim Tucker | F | Duquesne | 3 | 1954–1957 | 99 | 1,301 | 349 | 52 | 407 | 13.1 | 3.5 | 0.5 | 4.1 | |
| P. J. Tucker | F | Texas | 2 | 2022–2024 | 78 | 1,986 | 309 | 60 | 272 | 25.5 | 4.0 | 0.8 | 3.5 | |
| Rayjon Tucker | G | Little Rock | 1 | 2020–2021 | 14 | 68 | 11 | 6 | 34 | 4.9 | 0.8 | 0.4 | 2.4 | |
| Andre Turner | G | Memphis | 1 | 1990–1991 | 70 | 1,407 | 152 | 311 | 412 | 20.1 | 2.2 | 4.4 | 5.9 | |
| Evan Turner | G | Ohio State | 4 | 2010–2014 | 279 | 8,288 | 1,521 | 891 | 3,208 | 29.7 | 5.5 | 3.2 | 11.5 | |
| B. J. Tyler | G | Texas | 1 | 1994–1995 | 55 | 809 | 62 | 174 | 195 | 14.7 | 1.1 | 3.2 | 3.5 | |
| Tom Van Arsdale | G/F | Indiana | 3 | 1972–1975 | 117 | 4,343 | 607 | 280 | 2,182 | 37.1 | 5.2 | 2.4 | 18.6 | |
| Keith Van Horn | F | Utah | 1 | 2002–2003 | 74 | 2,337 | 524 | 93 | 1,176 | 31.6 | 7.1 | 1.3 | 15.9 | |
| Jarvis Varnado | F | Mississippi State | 1 | 2013–2014 | 23 | 337 | 63 | 13 | 99 | 14.7 | 2.7 | 0.6 | 4.3 | |
| Jay Vincent | F | Michigan State | 1 | 1989–1990 | 17 | 259 | 36 | 8 | 124 | 15.2 | 2.1 | 0.5 | 7.3 | |
| Danny Vranes | F | Utah | 2 | 1986–1988 | 115 | 1,589 | 263 | 66 | 261 | 13.8 | 2.3 | 0.6 | 2.3 | |
| Nikola Vučević | C | USC | 1 | 2011–2012 | 51 | 812 | 246 | 31 | 283 | 15.9 | 4.8 | 0.6 | 5.5 | |

=== W ===
All-time roster
| Player | Pos. | Pre-draft team | Yrs | Seasons | Statistics | | | | | | | | | Ref. |
| Player | Pos. | Pre-draft team | Yrs | Seasons | GP | MP | REB | AST | PTS | MPG | RPG | APG | PPG | Ref. |
|---|---|---|---|---|---|---|---|---|---|---|---|---|---|---|
| Chet Walker^ | G/F | Bradley | 7 | 1962–1969 | 558 | 17,624 | 4,416 | 1,029 | 9,043 | 31.6 | 7.9 | 1.8 | 16.2 | |
| Jabari Walker^{x} | F | Colorado | 1 | 2025–2026 | 64 | 762 | 192 | 34 | 276 | 11.9 | 3.0 | 0.5 | 4.3 | |
| Lonnie Walker IV | G | Miami (FL) | 1 | 2024–2025 | 20 | 477 | 63 | 50 | 247 | 23.9 | 3.2 | 2.5 | 12.4 | |
| Rex Walters | G | Kansas | 3 | 1995–1998 | 111 | 1,691 | 164 | 229 | 597 | 15.2 | 1.5 | 2.1 | 5.4 | |
| Perry Warbington | G | Georgia Southern | 1 | 1974–1975 | 5 | 70 | 8 | 16 | 10 | 14.0 | 1.6 | 3.2 | 2.0 | |
| Gerry Ward | G | Boston College | 1 | 1965–1966 | 66 | 838 | 89 | 80 | 173 | 12.7 | 1.3 | 1.2 | 2.6 | |
| Casper Ware | G | Long Beach State | 1 | 2013–2014 | 9 | 116 | 9 | 10 | 48 | 12.9 | 1.0 | 1.1 | 5.3 | |
| Ben Warley | G/F | Tennessee State | 4 | 1962–1966 | 170 | 2,852 | 984 | 128 | 1,089 | 16.8 | 5.8 | 0.8 | 6.4 | |
| Jim Washington | F/C | Villanova | 3 | 1969–1972 | 174 | 5,505 | 1,616 | 226 | 2,246 | 31.6 | 9.3 | 1.3 | 12.9 | |
| Wilson Washington | F/C | Old Dominion | 1 | 1977–1978 | 14 | 38 | 14 | 1 | 19 | 2.7 | 1.0 | 0.1 | 1.4 | |
| Trendon Watford | F | LSU | 1 | 2025–2026 | 53 | 864 | 175 | 132 | 346 | 16.3 | 3.3 | 2.5 | 6.5 | |
| Maalik Wayns | G | Villanova | 1 | 2012–2013 | 21 | 165 | 5 | 20 | 56 | 7.9 | 0.2 | 1.0 | 2.7 | |
| Clarence Weatherspoon | F | Southern Miss | 6 | 1992–1998 | 448 | 16,127 | 3,715 | 892 | 6,867 | 36.0 | 8.3 | 2.0 | 15.3 | |
| Chris Webber^ | F/C | Michigan | 3 | 2004–2007 | 114 | 4,139 | 1,055 | 383 | 2,044 | 36.3 | 9.3 | 3.4 | 17.9 | |
| Sonny Weems | G/F | Arkansas | 1 | 2015–2016 | 7 | 78 | 12 | 2 | 17 | 11.1 | 1.7 | 0.3 | 2.4 | |
| Bob Weiss | G | Penn State | 2 | 1965–1967 | 13 | 59 | 10 | 14 | 18 | 4.5 | 0.8 | 1.1 | 1.4 | |
| Chris Welp | C | Washington | 2 | 1987–1989 | 82 | 975 | 217 | 34 | 294 | 11.9 | 2.6 | 0.4 | 3.6 | |
| Walt Wesley | C | Kansas | 1 | 1974–1975 | 4 | 33 | 8 | 1 | 12 | 8.3 | 2.0 | 0.3 | 3.0 | |
| Phillip Wheeler | F | Ranney School | 1 | 2024–2025 | 5 | 44 | 8 | 2 | 8 | 8.8 | 1.6 | 0.4 | 1.6 | |
| Hubie White | G/F | Villanova | 1 | 1963–1964 | 23 | 196 | 42 | 12 | 79 | 8.5 | 1.8 | 0.5 | 3.4 | |
| Mitchell Wiggins | G | Florida State | 1 | 1991–1992 | 49 | 569 | 94 | 22 | 211 | 11.6 | 1.9 | 0.4 | 4.3 | |
| Damien Wilkins | G/F | Georgia | 1 | 2012–2013 | 61 | 1,095 | 105 | 91 | 388 | 18.0 | 1.7 | 1.5 | 6.4 | |
| Eddie Lee Wilkins | F/C | Gardner-Webb | 1 | 1992–1993 | 26 | 192 | 40 | 2 | 158 | 7.4 | 1.5 | 0.1 | 6.1 | |
| Elliot Williams | G | Memphis | 1 | 2013–2014 | 67 | 1,157 | 130 | 72 | 404 | 17.3 | 1.9 | 1.1 | 6.0 | |
| Jayson Williams | F/C | St. John's | 2 | 1990–1992 | 102 | 1,154 | 256 | 28 | 388 | 11.3 | 2.5 | 0.3 | 3.8 | |
| Lou Williams | G | South Gwinnett HS (GA) | 7 | 2005–2012 | 455 | 9,955 | 912 | 1,356 | 5,158 | 21.9 | 2.0 | 3.0 | 11.3 | |
| Monty Williams | F | Notre Dame | 1 | 2002–2003 | 21 | 276 | 45 | 26 | 92 | 13.1 | 2.1 | 1.2 | 4.4 | |
| Sam Williams | F | Arizona State | 2 | 1983–1985 | 116 | 1,863 | 432 | 71 | 616 | 16.1 | 3.7 | 0.6 | 5.3 | |
| Scott Williams | F/C | North Carolina | 5 | 1994–1999 | 212 | 4,109 | 1,141 | 135 | 1,130 | 19.4 | 5.4 | 0.6 | 5.3 | |
| Corliss Williamson | F | Arkansas | 1 | 2004–2005 | 48 | 1,056 | 178 | 43 | 518 | 22.0 | 3.7 | 0.9 | 10.8 | |
| D. J. Wilson | F | Michigan | 1 | 2023–2024 | 2 | 15 | 2 | 2 | 10 | 7.5 | 1.0 | 1.0 | 5.0 | |
| George Wilson | C | Cincinnati | 2 | 1968–1970 | 105 | 1,388 | 533 | 84 | 580 | 13.2 | 5.1 | 0.8 | 5.5 | |
| Trevor Wilson | F | UCLA | 1 | 1995–1996 | 6 | 79 | 14 | 4 | 23 | 13.2 | 2.3 | 0.7 | 3.8 | |
| David Wingate | G/F | Georgetown | 3 | 1986–1989 | 171 | 3,403 | 294 | 347 | 1,362 | 19.9 | 1.7 | 2.0 | 8.0 | |
| Voise Winters | F | Bradley | 1 | 1985–1986 | 4 | 17 | 3 | 0 | 6 | 4.3 | 0.8 | 0.0 | 1.5 | |
| Dave Wohl | G | Penn | 1 | 1971–1972 | 79 | 1,628 | 150 | 228 | 642 | 20.6 | 1.9 | 2.9 | 8.1 | |
| Christian Wood | F | UNLV | 1 | 2015–2016 | 17 | 145 | 38 | 3 | 61 | 8.5 | 2.2 | 0.2 | 3.6 | |
| Leon Wood | G | Cal State Fullerton | 2 | 1984–1986 | 67 | 724 | 45 | 120 | 276 | 10.8 | 0.7 | 1.8 | 4.1 | |
| Orlando Woolridge | F | Notre Dame | 1 | 1993–1994 | 74 | 1,955 | 298 | 139 | 937 | 26.4 | 4.0 | 1.9 | 12.7 | |
| Dorell Wright | G/F | South Kent School (CT) | 1 | 2012–2013 | 79 | 1,783 | 302 | 150 | 729 | 22.6 | 3.8 | 1.9 | 9.2 | |
| Sharone Wright | F/C | Clemson | 2 | 1994–1996 | 125 | 3,180 | 771 | 75 | 1,387 | 25.4 | 6.2 | 0.6 | 11.1 | |
| Tony Wroten | G | Washington | 3 | 2013–2016 | 110 | 2,804 | 335 | 394 | 1,513 | 25.5 | 3.0 | 3.6 | 13.8 | |

=== Y ===
All-time roster
| Player | Pos. | Pre-draft team | Yrs | Seasons | Statistics | | | | | | | | | Ref. |
| Player | Pos. | Pre-draft team | Yrs | Seasons | GP | MP | REB | AST | PTS | MPG | RPG | APG | PPG | Ref. |
|---|---|---|---|---|---|---|---|---|---|---|---|---|---|---|
| Guerschon Yabusele | C | (France) Rouen Métropole | 1 | 2024–2025 | 70 | 1,895 | 395 | 148 | 768 | 27.1 | 5.6 | 2.1 | 11.0 | |
| George Yardley^ | G/F | Stanford | 2 | 1958–1960 | 88 | 2,822 | 683 | 147 | 1,724 | 32.1 | 7.8 | 1.7 | 19.6 | |
| Barry Yates | F | Maryland | 1 | 1971–1972 | 24 | 144 | 40 | 7 | 69 | 6.0 | 1.7 | 0.3 | 2.9 | |
| James Young | G/F | Kentucky | 1 | 2017–2018 | 6 | 61 | 2 | 2 | 17 | 10.2 | 0.3 | 0.3 | 2.8 | |
| Michael Young | G/F | Houston | 1 | 1985–1986 | 2 | 2 | 0 | 0 | 0 | 1.0 | 0.0 | 0.0 | 0.0 | |
| Nick Young | G/F | USC | 1 | 2012–2013 | 59 | 1,411 | 130 | 84 | 628 | 23.9 | 2.2 | 1.4 | 10.6 | |
| Sam Young | F | Pittsburgh | 1 | 2011–2012 | 14 | 135 | 21 | 6 | 40 | 9.6 | 1.5 | 0.4 | 2.9 | |
| Thaddeus Young | F | Georgia Tech | 7 | 2007–2014 | 516 | 15,516 | 2,845 | 704 | 7,078 | 30.1 | 5.5 | 1.4 | 13.7 | |
