= 2021 McDonald's All-American Boys Game =

American high school basketball game

West	East
- Date: Cancelled

McDonald's All-American

The 2021 McDonald's All-American Boys Game was an all-star basketball game that was scheduled be held in 2021. The game's rosters featured the best and most highly recruited high school boys graduating in the class of 2021. The game would have been the 44th annual version of the McDonald's All-American Game first played in 1977. Due to the impact of the COVID-19 pandemic, the game was cancelled. The 24 players were selected from over 700 nominees by a committee of basketball experts. They were chosen not only for their on-court skills, but for their performances off the court as well.

== Rosters ==
When the rosters were announced on February 23, 2021, Michigan had the most selections with three, while Duke and Kentucky had two. At the announcement of roster selections, only 14 schools were represented and six players were uncommitted.

=== Team East ===
ESPN 100 Rank	Name	Height (ft–in)	Weight (lb)	Position	Hometown	High school	College choice
3	Paolo Banchero	6–9	235	PF	Seattle, Washington	O'Dea High School	Duke
10	Kennedy Chandler	6–1	170	PG	Memphis, Tennessee	Sunrise Christian Academy	Tennessee
15	Max Christie	6–7	185	SG	Arlington Heights, Illinois	Rolling Meadows High School	Michigan State
17	Daimion Collins	6–9	210	PF	Atlanta, Texas	Atlanta High School	Kentucky
11	JD Davison	6–3	175	PG	Letohatchee, Alabama	Calhoun High School	Alabama
8	Moussa Diabaté	6–10	215	PF	Paris, France	IMG Academy	Michigan
6	Michael Foster Jr.^	6–9	220	PF	Milwaukee, Wisconsin	Hillcrest Prep	—
14	AJ Griffin	6–7	220	SF	Ossining, New York	Archbishop Stepinac High School	Duke
7	Caleb Houstan	6–8	200	SF	Mississauga, Ontario	Montverde Academy	Michigan
19	Trevor Keels^	6–5	210	SG	Fairfax, Virginia	Paul VI Catholic	Duke
36	Daeshun Ruffin	5–9	175	PG	Jackson, Mississippi	Callaway High School	Ole Miss
5	Jabari Smith	6–10	210	PF	Fayetteville, Georgia	Sandy Creek High School	Auburn

=== Team West ===
ESPN 100 Rank	Name	Height (ft–in)	Weight (lb)	Position	Hometown	High school	College choice
4	Patrick Baldwin Jr.^	6–10	225	PF	Milwaukee, Wisconsin	Hamilton High School	Milwaukee
9	Nathan Bittle	6–11	205	C	Central Point, Oregon	Prolific Prep	Oregon
20	Kendall Brown	6–8	205	SF	Cottage Grove, Minnesota	Sunrise Christian Academy	Baylor
47	Kobe Bufkin	6–4	180	SG	Grand Rapids, Michigan	Grand Rapids Christian High School	Michigan
39	Jackson Grant	6–10	205	C	Olympia, Washington	Olympia High School	Washington
2	Jaden Hardy^	6–4	190	SG	Detroit, Michigan	Coronado High School	—
28	Nolan Hickman	6–2	175	PG	Seattle, Washington	Wasatch Academy	Gonzaga
1	Chet Holmgren^	7–1	195	C	Minneapolis, Minnesota	Minnehaha Academy	Gonzaga
16	Harrison Ingram	6–7	210	SF	Dallas, Texas	St. Mark's School	Stanford
18	Aminu Mohammed	6–5	190	SG	Lagos, Nigeria	Greenwood Laboratory School	Georgetown
13	Hunter Sallis^	6–5	175	PG	Omaha, Nebraska	Millard North High School	Gonzaga
12	Peyton Watson	6–7	185	SF	Long Beach, California	Long Beach Polytechnic High School	UCLA

^undecided at the time of roster selection
