= Michael Foster Jr. =

American basketball player (born 2003)

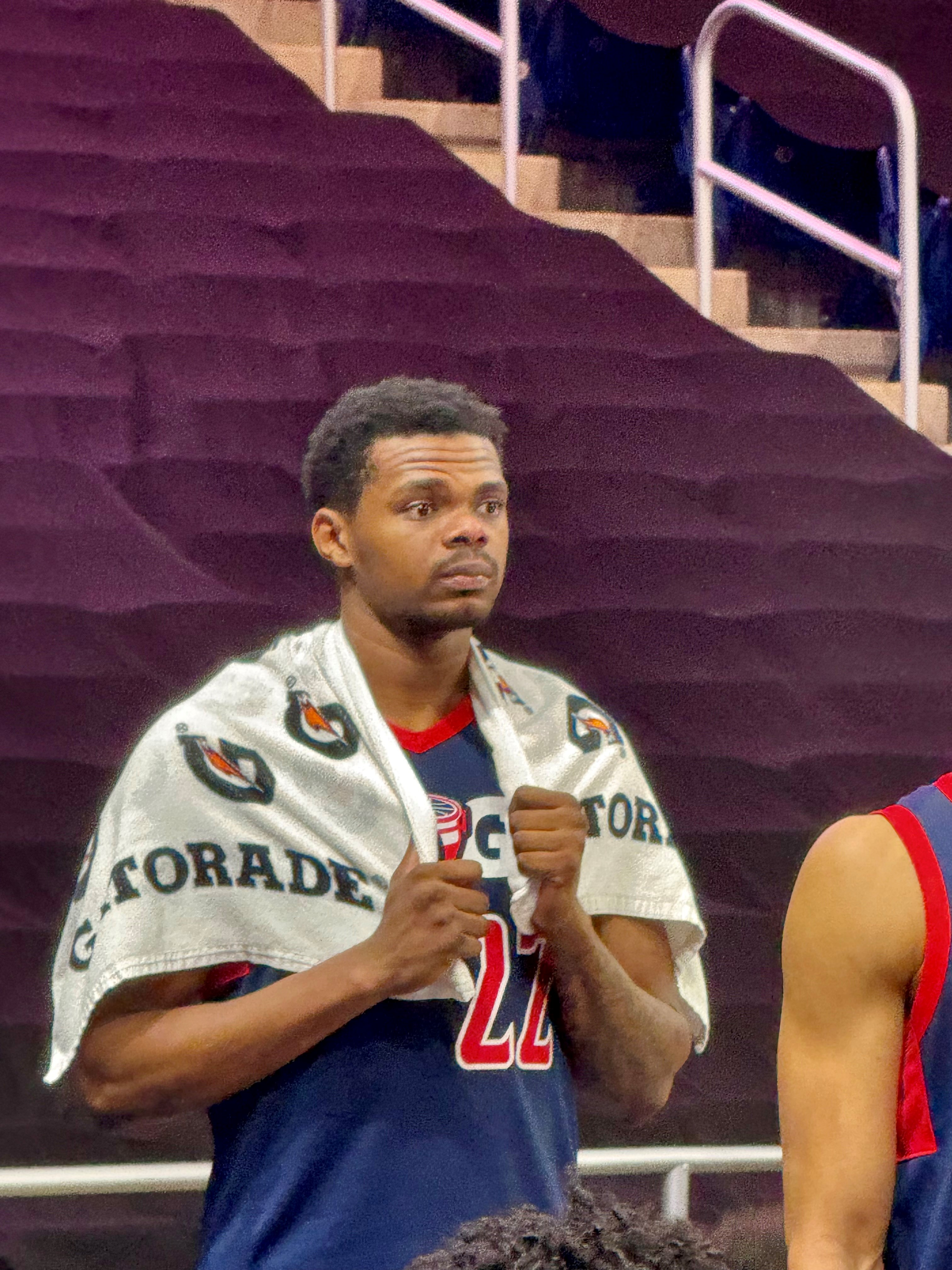
- Foster with the Capital City Go-Go in 2023

Free agent
- Position: Power forward

Personal information
- Born: January 16, 2003 (age 23) Milwaukee, Wisconsin, U.S.
- Listed height: 6 ft 8 in (2.03 m)
- Listed weight: 250 lb (113 kg)

Career information
- High school: Washington (Milwaukee, Wisconsin); Hillcrest Prep (Phoenix, Arizona)
- NBA draft: 2022: undrafted
- Playing career: 2021–present

Career history
- 2021–2022: NBA G League Ignite
- 2022: Philadelphia 76ers
- 2022: →Delaware Blue Coats
- 2022–2023: Delaware Blue Coats
- 2023–2024: Capital City Go-Go
- 2024: Cangrejeros de Santurce
- 2024: Jiangxi Ganchi
- 2024: NBA G League United
- 2024–2025: Capital City Go-Go
- 2025: Scarborough Shooting Stars
- 2025: Hapoel Be'er Sheva
- 2026: Dar City
- 2026: Scarborough Shooting Stars

Career highlights
- NBA G League champion (2023); McDonald's All-American (2021)
- Stats at NBA.com
- Stats at Basketball Reference

Michael Foster Jr. (born January 16, 2003) is an American professional basketball player who last played for the Scarborough Shooting Stars of the Canadian Elite Basketball League (CEBL). He previously played for the NBA G League Ignite, and appeared in one NBA game for the Philadelphia 76ers.

== High school career ==
Foster attended Washington High School of Information Technology in Milwaukee, Wisconsin. He led his team to a state runner-up finish in each of his first two years. For his junior season, Foster transferred to Hillcrest Prep in Phoenix, Arizona. As a senior, he averaged 32.2 points and 18.4 rebounds per game. Foster was named to the McDonald's All-American Game and Jordan Brand Classic rosters.

=== Recruiting ===
Foster was rated a five-star recruit by ESPN and 247Sports, and a four-star recruit by Rivals. As a freshman in high school, Foster committed to playing college basketball for Arizona State, but reopened his recruitment in the following year. On April 23, 2021, he announced that he would join the NBA G League, forgoing college basketball. He chose the G League over offers from Florida State and Georgia.

College recruiting
Name	Hometown	School	Height	Weight	Commit date
Michael Foster; PF	Milwaukee, WI	Hillcrest Prep (AZ)	6 ft 9 in (2.06 m)	220 lb (100 kg)	—
Michael Foster; PF	Recruit ratings: Rivals: 247Sports: ESPN: (96)				
Overall recruit ranking: Rivals: 31 247Sports: 20 ESPN: 9
Note: In many cases, Scout, Rivals, 247Sports, On3, and ESPN may conflict in their listings of height and weight.; In these cases, the average was taken. ESPN grades are on a 100-point scale.; Sources: "2021 Team Ranking". Rivals.

== Professional career ==
=== NBA G League Ignite (2021–2022) ===
On April 23, 2021, Foster signed with the NBA G League Ignite, a developmental team affiliated with the NBA G League.

=== Philadelphia 76ers (2022) ===
After going undrafted in the 2022 NBA draft, Foster signed an Exhibit 10 contract with the Philadelphia 76ers. Foster joined the 76ers' roster in the 2022 NBA Summer League. In his Summer League debut, Foster scored five points in a Salt Lake City Summer League game against the Memphis Grizzlies. On October 16, 2022, Foster's contract was converted to a two-way. He was released into free agency on November 23 following the signing of Saben Lee.

=== Delaware Blue Coats (2022–2023) ===
On December 5, Foster re-joined the Delaware Blue Coats and eventually helped the team win the NBA G League title.

=== Capital City Go-Go (2023–2024) ===
On October 11, 2023, Foster signed with the Washington Wizards, but was waived on October 20. Ten days later, he joined the Capital City Go-Go.

=== Cangrejeros de Santurce (2024) ===
On April 13, 2024, Foster signed with the Cangrejeros de Santurce of the Baloncesto Superior Nacional.

=== Jiangxi Ganchi (2024) ===
On June 12, 2024, Foster signed with Jiangxi Ganchi of the National Basketball League.

=== Return to Capital City (2024–2025) ===
On October 28, 2024, Foster rejoined the Capital City Go-Go.

== Career statistics ==
Legend
GP	Games played	GS	Games started	MPG	Minutes per game
FG%	Field goal percentage	3P%	3-point field goal percentage	FT%	Free throw percentage
RPG	Rebounds per game	APG	Assists per game	SPG	Steals per game
BPG	Blocks per game	PPG	Points per game	**Bold**	Career high

=== NBA ===
Year	Team	GP	GS	MPG	FG%	3P%	FT%	RPG	APG	SPG	BPG	PPG
2022–23	Philadelphia	1	0	1.0	–	–	–	.0	.0	.0	.0	.0
Career		1	0	1.0	–	–	–	.0	.0	.0	.0	.0
