= Hunter Sallis =

American basketball player (born 2003)

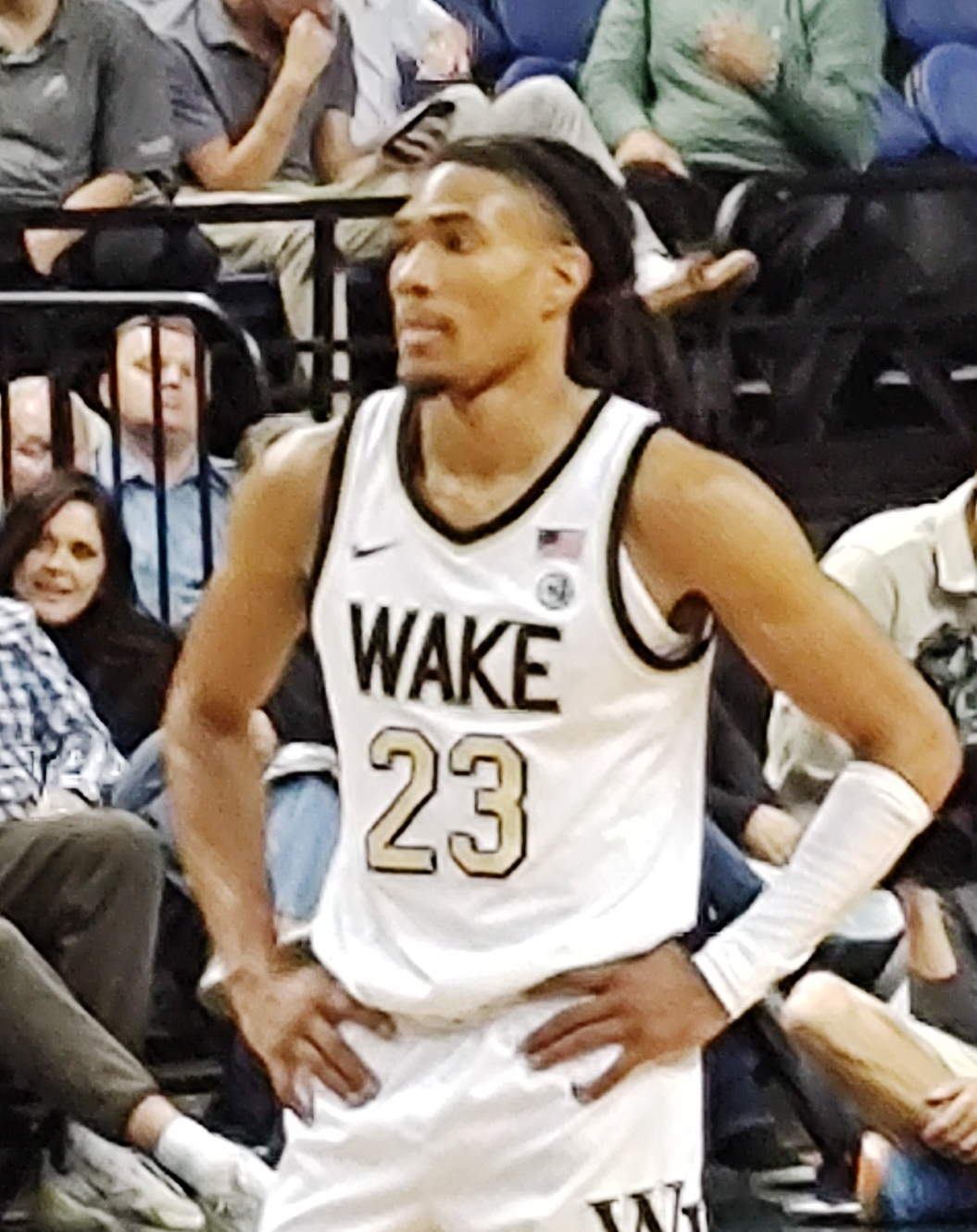
- Sallis with Wake Forest in 2024

No. 45 – San Diego Clippers
- Position: Shooting guard
- League: NBA G League

Personal information
- Born: March 26, 2003 (age 23) Omaha, Nebraska, U.S.
- Listed height: 6 ft 4 in (1.93 m)
- Listed weight: 185 lb (84 kg)

Career information
- High school: Millard North (Omaha, Nebraska)
- College: Gonzaga (2021–2023); Wake Forest (2023–2025)
- NBA draft: 2025: undrafted
- Playing career: 2025–present

Career history
- 2025: Philadelphia 76ers
- 2025: →Delaware Blue Coats
- 2026–present: San Diego Clippers

Career highlights
- 2× First-team All-ACC (2024, 2025); McDonald's All-American (2021); Nike Hoop Summit (2021)
- Stats at NBA.com
- Stats at Basketball Reference

Hunter Amon Sallis (born March 26, 2003) is an American professional basketball player for the San Diego Clippers of the NBA G League. He played college basketball for the Gonzaga Bulldogs and Wake Forest Demon Deacons.

== High school career ==
Sallis did not start on his middle school basketball team but earned a spot on the varsity team as a freshman at Millard North High School in Omaha, Nebraska. He was nicknamed "Bambi" due to his lack of coordination at the time. As a senior, Sallis averaged 22.2 points, 4.6 rebounds and 3.8 assists per game, leading Millard North to its first Class A state title in 2021. He finished with 1,819 career points, the third-most in Class A history, behind only Andre Woolridge and Erick Strickland. He was named to the rosters for the McDonald's All-American Game, Jordan Brand Classic and Nike Hoop Summit. Additionally, he was named the Nebraska Gatorade Player of the Year.

=== Recruiting ===
Sallis was rated a five-star recruit by ESPN and 247Sports, and a four-star recruit by Rivals. He was the first five-star basketball recruit in Nebraska history. On March 26, 2021, he committed to playing college basketball for Gonzaga over offers from North Carolina and Creighton. He became the highest-ranked recruit in program history until Chet Holmgren committed a month later.

College recruiting
Name	Hometown	School	Height	Weight	Commit date
Hunter Sallis; PG	Omaha, NE	Millard North (NE)	6 ft 5 in (1.96 m)	175 lb (79 kg)	Mar 26, 2021
Hunter Sallis; PG	Recruit ratings: Rivals: 247Sports: ESPN: (93)				
Overall recruit ranking: Rivals: 36 247Sports: 9 ESPN: 16
Note: In many cases, Scout, Rivals, 247Sports, On3, and ESPN may conflict in their listings of height and weight.; In these cases, the average was taken. ESPN grades are on a 100-point scale.; Sources: "Gonzaga 2021 Basketball Commitments". Rivals.; "2021 Gonzaga Bulldogs Recruiting Class". ESPN.; "2021 Team Ranking". Rivals.

== College career ==
Sallis averaged 4.3 points, 2.0 rebounds per game as a freshman at Gonzaga. As a sophomore, Sallis averaged 4.5 points, 2.2 rebounds and 1.4 assists per game.

After two seasons at Gonzaga, he transferred to Wake Forest. On November 29, 2023, Sallis scored 24 points and 4 assists in a 82-71 win against Florida. On December 30, 2023, Sallis scored 20 points and 9 rebounds in a 86-63 victory over Virginia Tech. On January 2, 2024, Sallis scored 21 points and 3 assists in a 84-78 win over Boston College. On January 13, 2024, Sallis scored 21 points and 9 rebounds in a 66-47 win against Virginia. On February 3, 2024, Sallis had 24 points, 5 assists and 3 rebounds in a 99-70 win over Syracuse. On February 10, 2024, Sallis scored a career-high 33 points and 6 rebounds in a 83-79 victory against NC State. On February 24, 2024, Sallis scored 29 points and 6 rebounds in a 83-79 win over Duke. On February 26, 2024, Sallis earned Atlantic Coast Conference (ACC) player of the week honors after averaging 23.0 points, 5.0 rebounds and 3.0 assists per game.

== Professional career ==
On June 26, 2025 after being undrafted in the 2025 NBA draft, Sallis signed a two-way contract with the Philadelphia 76ers. He made seven appearances for the 76ers, averaging 1.0 point, 0.1 rebounds, and 0.6 assists. On December 24, Sallis was waived by Philadelphia following the signing of MarJon Beauchamp. He was then signed by the San Diego Clippers of the G League.

== Career statistics ==
Legend
GP	Games played	GS	Games started	MPG	Minutes per game
FG%	Field goal percentage	3P%	3-point field goal percentage	FT%	Free throw percentage
RPG	Rebounds per game	APG	Assists per game	SPG	Steals per game
BPG	Blocks per game	PPG	Points per game	**Bold**	Career high

=== NBA ===
Year	Team	GP	GS	MPG	FG%	3P%	FT%	RPG	APG	SPG	BPG	PPG
2025–26	Philadelphia	7	0	3.7	.600	–	.500	.1	.6	.0	.1	1.0
Career		7	0	3.7	.600	–	.500	.1	.6	.0	.1	1.0

=== College ===
Year	Team	GP	GS	MPG	FG%	3P%	FT%	RPG	APG	SPG	BPG	PPG
2021–22	Gonzaga	32	0	13.6	**.564**	.263	.708	2.0	.6	.6	.2	4.3
2022–23	Gonzaga	**37**	0	16.8	.466	.256	.780	2.2	1.4	.6	.2	4.5
2023–24	Wake Forest	34	**34**	35.4	.487	**.405**	.783	4.1	2.5	1.1	**.6**	18.0
2024–25	Wake Forest	32	32	**35.9**	.457	.277	**.804**	**5.1**	**2.8**	**1.2**	.5	**18.3**
Career		135	66	25.3	.479	.333	.787	3.3	1.8	.9	.4	11.1

== Personal life ==
Sallis' mother, Jessica Haynes, led Omaha Central High School to two Nebraska Class A state basketball titles and played for San Diego State at the college level. Haynes' cousins include professional basketball players James Harden and Ron Boone.

== See also ==
- List of All-Atlantic Coast Conference men's basketball teams
