= 2021–22 Latvian–Estonian Basketball League =

Latvian–Estonian Basketball League
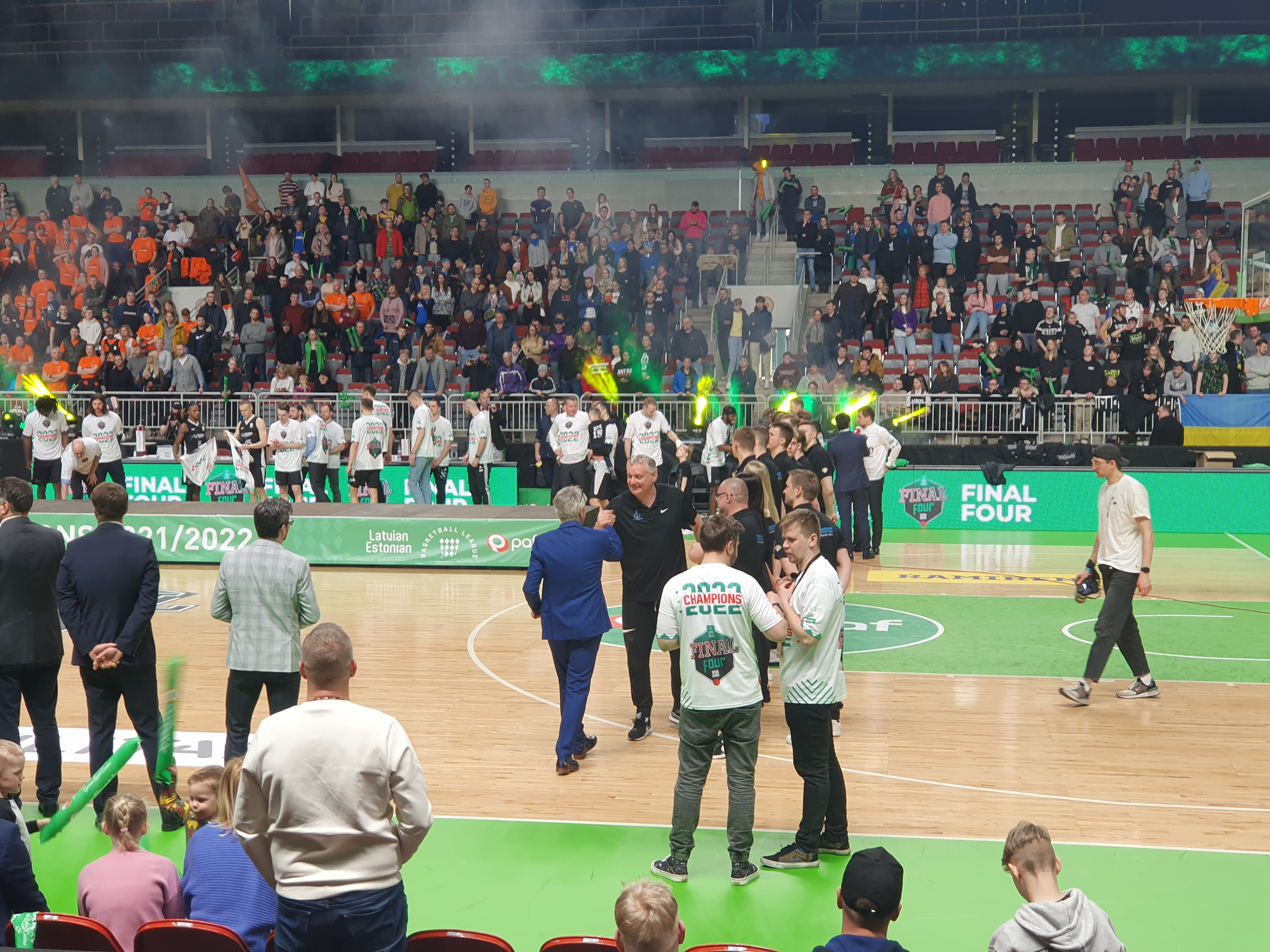
- Award ceremony after final
- Season: 2021–22
- Duration: 1 October 2021 – 10 April 2022
- Teams: 14
- TV partner(s): TV4 (Previously Sportacentrs.com TV, all games to semi-final), LTV7 (Only final), Delfi TV

Regular season
- Season MVP: (Latvia) Kristaps Dārgais

Finals
- Champions: (Latvia) VEF Rīga
- Runners-up: (Estonia) Viimsi/Sportland
- Third place: (Estonia) PärnuSadam
- Fourth place: (Latvia) Ogre
- Finals MVP: (United States) Jalen Riley

Statistical leaders
Points	(United States) Brandon Childress	23,9
Rebounds	(United States) Demajeo Wiggins	10,6
Assists	(United States) Jaron Martin	7,3
Index Rating	(United States) Brandon Childress	+23,4

Records
- Biggest home win: Kalev/Cramo 113–55 Tallinna Kalev (19 January 2022)
- Biggest away win: Rakvere Tarvas 58–110 VEF Rīga (11 February 2022)
- Highest scoring: Liepāja 105–100 Rakvere Tarvas (2 October 2021)
- Winning streak: 17 games VEF Rīga
- Losing streak: 17 games Tallinna Kalev

The 2021–22 Latvian–Estonian Basketball League, known as Paf Latvian–Estonian Basketball League for sponsorship reasons, was the 4th season of the Latvian–Estonian Basketball League, the combined top basketball division of Latvia and Estonia.

The season began on 1 October 2021. Regular season ended on 26 March 2022. The play-off quarterfinal series were being played after the regular season but the champion was crowned in a Final Four tournament.

== Competition format ==
The regular season includes two rounds, followed by the quarter-finals and Final 4. The league’s management followed the development of the epidemiological situation in both countries and if necessary, the playoff system may be changed. However, no changes were applied, except for some rescheduled regular season games.

== Teams ==
14 teams, 8 from Estonia and 6 from Latvia, contested the league in the 2021–22 season.

=== Venues and locations ===
Location of the 2021–22 Latvian–Estonian Basketball League teams

Team	Home city	Arena	Capacity
(Estonia) Avis Utilitas Rapla	Rapla	Sadolin Sports Hall	1000
(Estonia) Kalev/Cramo	Tallinn	Kalev Sports Hall	1870
(Estonia) Kalev/Cramo	Tallinn	Saku Suurhall	7200
(Latvia) Latvijas Universitāte	Rīga	Rimi Olympic Sports Center	830
(Latvia) Liepāja	Liepāja	Liepāja Olympic Center	2542
(Latvia) Ogre	Ogre	Ogre 1st Secondary School	500
(Estonia) Pärnu Sadam	Pärnu	Pärnu Sports Hall	1820
(Estonia) Rakvere Tarvas	Rakvere	Rakvere Sports Hall	2747
(Estonia) Tallinna Kalev	Tallinn	Sõle Sports Centre	
(Estonia) Tallinna Kalev	Tallinn	Nord Cramo Sports Hall	980
(Estonia) TalTech	Tallinn	TalTech Sports Hall	1000
(Estonia) Tartu Ülikool Maks & Moorits	Tartu	University of Tartu Sports Hall	2600
(Estonia) Viimsi/Sportland	Viimsi	Karulaugu Spordikeskus	500
(Latvia) Valmiera Glass VIA	Valmiera	Vidzeme Olympic Center	1500
(Latvia) VEF Rīga	Rīga	Rimi Olympic Sports Center	830
(Latvia) VEF Rīga	Rīga	Arena Riga	11 200
(Latvia) Ventspils	Ventspils	Ventspils Olympic Center	3085

=== Personnel and kits ===
Team	Head coach	Captain	Kit manufacturer
(Estonia) Avis Utilitas Rapla	(Spain) Lluis Riera	(Estonia) Sven Kaldre	Spalding
(Estonia) Kalev/Cramo	(Latvia) Roberts Štelmahers	(Estonia) Martin Dorbek	Nike
(Latvia) Latvijas Universitāte	(Latvia) Guntis Endzels	(Latvia) Edvards Mežulis	Nike
(Latvia) Liepāja	(Latvia) Artūrs Visockis-Rubenis	(Latvia) Roberts Krastiņš	Nike
(Latvia) Ogre	(Latvia) Uldis Švēde	(Latvia) Rinalds Sirsniņš	Erreà
(Estonia) Pärnu Sadam	(Estonia) Heiko Rannula	(Estonia) Mihkel Kirves	Nike
(Estonia) Rakvere Tarvas	(Estonia) Martin Müürsepp	(Estonia) Sten Saaremäel	Spalding
(Estonia) Tallinna Kalev	(Estonia) Brett Nõmm	(Estonia) Mario Paiste	Nike
(Estonia) TalTech	(Estonia) Alar Varrak	(Estonia) Oliver Metsalu	Nike
(Estonia) Tartu Ülikool Maks & Moorits	(Latvia) Nikolajs Mazurs	(Lithuania) Adomas Drungilas	Spalding
(Estonia) KK Viimsi	(Estonia) Valdo Lips	(Estonia) Rain Veideman	Nike
(Latvia) Valmiera Glass VIA	(Latvia) Edmunds Valeiko	(Latvia) Ervīns Jonāts	Spalding
(Latvia) VEF Rīga	(Latvia) Jānis Gailītis	(Latvia) Artis Ate	
(Latvia) Ventspils	(Latvia) Gints Fogels	(Latvia) Andrejs Šeļakovs	Joma

== Regular season ==
=== League table ===
Pos	Team	Pld	W	L	PF	PA	PD	PCT	Qualification or relegation
1	(Latvia) VEF Rīga	26	23	3	2346	1808	+538	.885	Advance to playoffs
2	(Estonia) Kalev/Cramo	26	21	5	2189	1688	+501	.808	Advance to playoffs
3	(Latvia) Ventspils	26	21	5	2163	1909	+254	.808	Advance to playoffs
4	(Estonia) TalTech	26	18	8	2148	1970	+178	.692	Advance to playoffs
5	(Latvia) Ogre	26	16	10	2125	2011	+114	.615	Advance to playoffs
6	(Estonia) Viimsi	26	16	10	2020	2025	−5	.615	Advance to playoffs
7	(Estonia) Pärnu Sadam	26	15	11	2137	1986	+151	.577	Advance to playoffs
8	(Estonia) Tartu Ülikool Maks & Moorits	26	12	14	1945	2035	−90	.462	Advance to playoffs
9	(Estonia) Avis Utilitas Rapla	26	12	14	2164	2200	−36	.462	
10	(Latvia) Valmiera Glass VIA	26	8	18	1925	2101	−176	.308	
11	(Latvia) Latvijas Universitāte	26	6	20	1809	2047	−238	.231	
12	(Latvia) Liepāja	26	5	21	1973	2186	−213	.192	
13	(Estonia) Rakvere Tarvas	26	5	21	1900	2315	−415	.192	
14	(Estonia) Tallinna Kalev	26	4	22	1763	2326	−563	.154	

Updated to match(es) played on 26 March 2022. Source: estlatbl.com

=== Results ===
Home \ Away	(Estonia) KAL	(Latvia) LIE	(Latvia) LUN	(Latvia) OGR	(Estonia) PAR	(Estonia) RAK	(Estonia) RAP	(Estonia) TCH	(Estonia) TLU	(Estonia) TRT	(Latvia) VEF	(Latvia) VEN	(Estonia) VII	(Latvia) VLM
(Estonia) Kalev/Cramo	—	87–62	69–67	94–69	66–79	94–65	92–66	93–63	113–55	86–36	76–93	81–55	80–67	97–66
(Latvia) Liepāja	59–78	—	72–77	94–83	84–70	105–100	61–63	80–81	79–80	83–86	77–83	73–98	66–74	80–82
(Latvia) Latvijas Universitāte	58–68	89–68	—	63–82	79–99	64–61	61–92	79–89	92–64	80–77	72–94	71–94	57–67	68–60
(Latvia) Ogre	76–64	90–76	93–79	—	74–71	95–75	107–84	77–65	106–80	85–66	59–83	69–78	100–77	81–87
(Estonia) Pärnu Sadam	78–79	79–68	80–56	83–78	—	105–74	78–83	60–61	98–72	76–66	77–80	94–79	74–82	94–71
(Estonia) Rakvere Tarvas	65–93	79–86	91–79	57–72	61–95	—	88–91	62–92	91–83	91–89	58–110	67–99	69–89	86–81
(Estonia) Avis Utilitas Rapla	61–85	105–69	84–74	86–88	107–79	90–85	—	95–78	87–96	78–83	52–99	82–94	95–97	93–77
(Estonia) TalTech	53–71	87–81	94–62	103–73	91–73	106–60	82–73	—	92–67	92–76	88–102	102–90	70–88	78–76
(Estonia) Tallinna Kalev	62–90	74–97	74–67	52–97	57–84	80–81	64–78	53–84	—	73–81	66–93	64–103	75–97	89–69
(Estonia) Tartu Ülikool Maks & Moorits	64–92	78–71	67–53	75–81	82–77	70–67	94–98	68–81	77–62	—	64–95	83–63	65–82	75–61
(Latvia) VEF Rīga	86–84	102–71	79–59	96–84	92–95	94–52	96–69	83–75	97–51	86–93	—	93–57	94–60	73–55
(Latvia) Ventspils	75–68	94–71	68–59	77–57	81–72	89–67	91–81	86–71	93–54	69–62	87–81	—	100–70	83–80
(Estonia) Viimsi	49–97	81–69	85–74	67–74	82–83	84–73	91–84	71–76	87–62	88–75	64–87	67–80	—	73–70
(Latvia) Valmiera Glass VIA	59–92	86–71	76–70	79–75	81–84	80–75	91–87	71–94	93–54	65–93	63–75	70–80	76–81	—

Updated to match(es) played on 26 March 2022. Source: estlatbl.com
Legend: Blue = home team win; Red = away team win.
Matches with lighter background shading were decided after overtime.

== Play-offs ==
In quarter-finals teams play against each other must win two games to win the series. Quarter-finals started on 29 March and ended on 4 April, with three of four winners being teams without home-court advantage. Semi-finals and final in a Final Four format was held on 9–10 April at the Arēna Rīga in Rīga, Latvia.

=== Quarter-finals ===
Team 1	Agg.	Team 2	1st leg	2nd leg
VEF Rīga (Latvia)	2–0	(Estonia) Tartu Ülikool Maks & Moorits	91–57	88–85 OT
Kalev/Cramo (Estonia)	0–2	(Estonia) Pärnu Sadam	60–67	57–76
BK Ventspils (Latvia)	0–2	(Estonia) KK Viimsi	63–70	77–79 OT
TalTech/Optibet (Estonia)	0–2	(Latvia) BK Ogre	77–89	69–85

=== Games ===
29 March 2022	Kalev/Cramo	60–67	Pärnu Sadam	Tallinn
19:00 (EET)	Scoring by quarter: 24–20, 13–18, 13–14, 10–13
	Pts: Siliņš 25; Rebs: Murphy 9 Asts: Jackson 6	Box Score	Pts: Barnies 18; Rebs: Kirves 13; Asts: Post 2	Arena: Kalev Sports Hall; Attendance: 354; Referees: Tanel Suslov, Mihkel Männiste, Rainis Värv

29 March 2022	VEF Rīga	91–57	Tartu Ülikool Maks & Moorits	Rīga
19:30 (EET)	Scoring by quarter: 23–19, 19–11, 23–16, 26–11
	Pts: Madsen 23; Rebs: Gromovs 9 Asts: Zoriks 7	Box Score	Pts: Drungilas 14; Rebs: Drungilas 6 Asts: Rosenthal 4	Arena: Rimi Olympic Center; Attendance: 600; Referees: Oskars Lucis, Andris Aunkrogers, Gatis Saliņš

30 March 2022	TalTech/Optibet	77–89	BK Ogre	Tallinn
19:00 (EET)	Scoring by quarter: 19–26, 27–21, 15–19, 16–23
	Pts: Childress 18; Rebs: Metsalu 9 Asts: Childress, Sokk, Ilves 3	Box Score	Pts: Sirsniņš 22; Rebs: Dārgais 13; Asts: Sirsniņš 7	Arena: TalTech Sports Hall; Attendance: 461; Referees: Mihkel Männiste, Mart Uuehendrik, Hendrik Laas

31 March 2022	BK Ventspils	63–70	Viimsi/Sportland	Ventspils
19:00 (EET)	Scoring by quarter: 16–18, 16–15, 23–22, 8–15
	Pts: Majauskas 19; Rebs: Sīpoliņš 11; Asts: Thomas 6	Box Score	Pts: Robersons 15; Rebs: Zaķis 11; Asts: Harris 5	Arena: Ventspils Olympic Center; Attendance: 1100; Referees: Mārtiņš Kozlovskis, Einārs Tukišs, Elvis Binders-Čoders

1 April 2022	Tartu Ülikool Maks & Moorits	85–88(OT)	VEF Rīga	Tartu
18:00 (EET)	Scoring by quarter: 36–19, 7–19, 19–20, 18–22, Overtime: 5–8
	Pts: Huggins 19; Rebs: Wembi 8 Asts: Wembi, Elksnis 5	Box Score	Pts: Madsen 24; Rebs: Gromovs 9 Asts: Curry 6	Arena: University of Tartu Sports Hall; Attendance: 721; Referees: Aare Halliko, Rain Peerandi, Aleksei Mohov

2 April 2022	Pärnu Sadam	76–57	Kalev/Cramo	Pärnu
17:00 (EET)	Scoring by quarter: 13–15, 23–16, 18–6, 22–17
	Pts: Gilbert 18; Rebs: Kirves 12; Asts: Gilbert 6	Box Score	Pts: Hermet 13; Rebs: Nurger 7 Asts: Dorbek 7	Arena: Pärnu Sports Hall; Attendance: 850; Referees: Aare Halliko, Alex Talisainen, Ivo Kitsing

2 April 2022	BK Ogre	85–69	TalTech/Optibet	Ogre
17:00 (EET)	Scoring by quarter: 19–20, 25–13, 22–12, 19–24
	Pts: Jucikas, Zēbergs 13; Rebs: Jucikas 10; Asts: Sirsniņš 9	Box Score	Pts: Metsalu 17; Rebs: Keedus, Metsalu, Kajupank 5 Asts: Ilves 5	Arena: Ogres 1. vidusskola Referees: Kristaps Konstantinovs, Ritvars Helmšteins, Mārcis Senkēvičs

3 April 2022	Viimsi/Sportland	79–77(OT)	BK Ventspils	Viimsi
17:00 (EET)	Scoring by quarter: 19–19, 133–18, 21–15, 17–18, Overtime: 9–7
	Pts: Zaķis 20; Rebs: Lips 9 Asts: Harris, Veideman 4	Box Score	Pts: Ausējs 18; Rebs: Sīpoliņš 8 Asts: Thomas, Ķilps 3	Arena: Karulaugu Spordikeskus; Attendance: 700; Referees: Tanel Suslov, Mart Uuehendrik, Ranno Konks

== Final Four ==
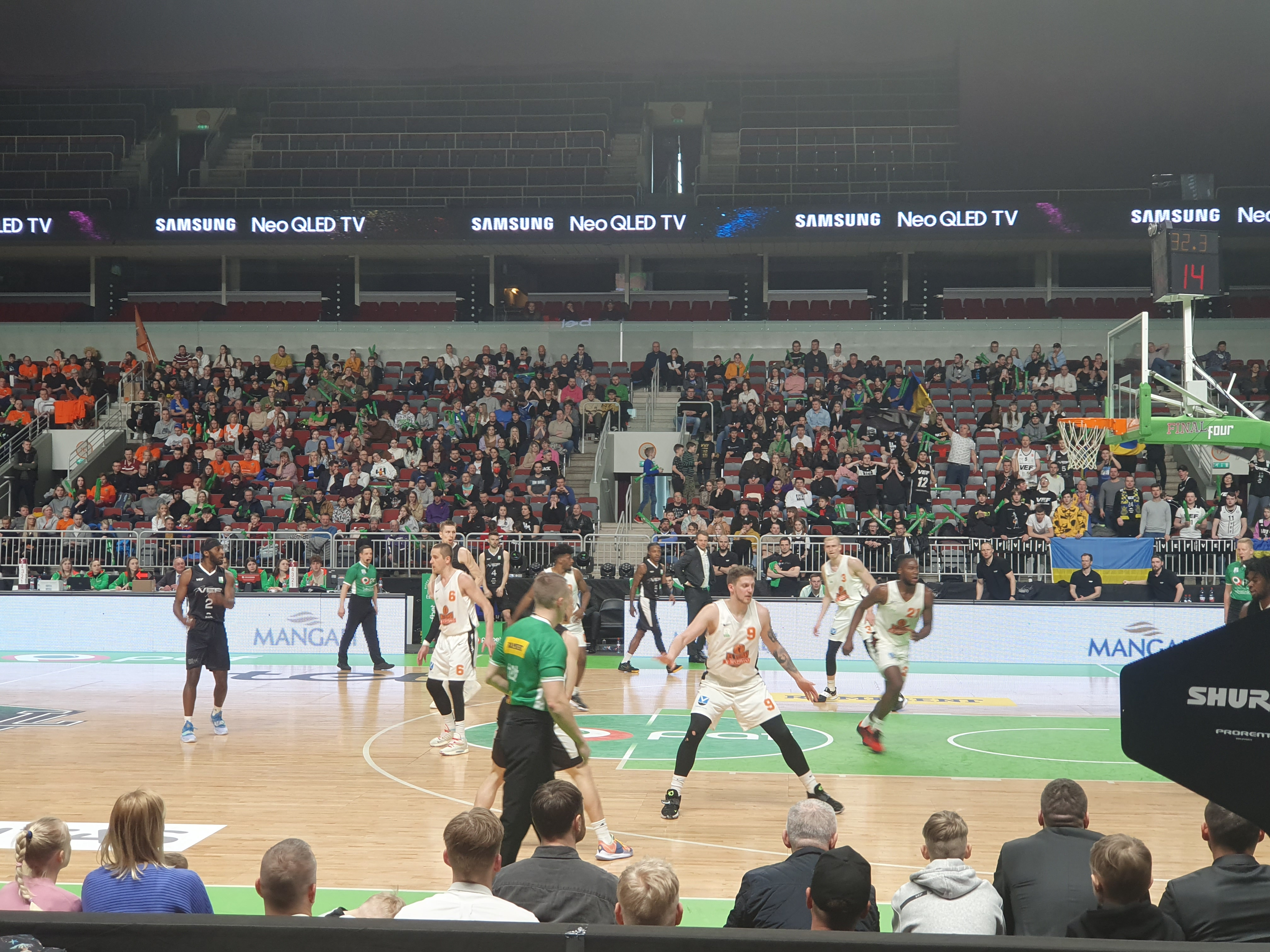
Final game between VEF Rīga and Viimsi/Sportland

Final Four was held on 9–10 April at the Arēna Rīga in Rīga, Latvia.

Semifinals; 9 April
1	(Latvia) VEF Rīga	116
5	(Latvia) BK Ogre	55
7	(Estonia) Pärnu Sadam	81
6	(Estonia) Viimsi/Sportland	83

Final; April 10
1	(Latvia) VEF Rīga	95
6	(Estonia) Viimsi/Sportland	64
Bronze medal game April 10
5	(Latvia) BK Ogre	77
7	(Estonia) Pärnu Sadam	84

=== Semi-finals ===
9 April 2022	VEF Rīga	116–55	Ogre	Rīga, Latvia
16:00 (EET)	Scoring by quarter: 26–9, 31–19, 31–4, 28–23
	Pts: Riley 23; Rebs: Hammonds 6 Asts: Zotov 8	Box Score	Pts: Antrops 9 Rebs: Blaus 5 Asts: Sirsniņš, Zēbergs, Blaus 2	Arena: Arēna Rīga; Attendance: 1257; Referees: Aare Halliko, Tanel Suslov, Ritvars Helmšteins

9 April 2022	Viimsi	83–81	Pärnu Sadam	Rīga, Latvia
19:00 (EET)	Scoring by quarter: 17–18, 24–24, 13–16, 29–23
	Pts: Roberson 19; Rebs: Lips 13; Asts: Veideman 7		Pts: Barnies 19; Rebs: Barnies 8 Asts: Alterique Gilbert 6	Arena: Arēna Rīga; Attendance: 1056; Referees: Andris Aunkrogers, Kristaps Konstantinovs, Einārs Tukišs

=== Third place game ===
10 April 2022	Ogre	77–84	Pärnu Sadam	Rīga, Latvia
14:00 (EET)	Scoring by quarter: 16–21, 18–27, 20–14, 23–22
	Pts: Nixon 20; Rebs: Zēbergs, Dārgais 6 Asts: Sirsniņš 8	Box Score	Pts: Valge 30; Rebs: Valeika 7 Asts: Post 6	Arena: Arēna Rīga; Attendance: 1698; Referees: Aare Halliko, Mārtiņš Kozlovskis, Tanel Suslov

=== Final ===
10 April 2022	VEF Rīga	95–64	Viimsi/Sportland	Rīga, Latvia
17:00 (EET)	Scoring by quarter: 27–12, 23–20, 17–20, 28–12
	Pts: Riley 20; Rebs: Madsen 9 Asts: Zoriks 6		Pts: Jurkatamm, Roberson 17; Rebs: Roberson 11; Asts: Laane, Harris 4	Arena: Arēna Rīga; Attendance: 3972; Referees: Oļegs Latiševs, Rauno Peerandi, Kristaps Konstantinovs

== Statistics ==
As of April 10, 2022.

=== Points ===
Rank	Name	Team	PPG
1.	(United States) Brandon Childress	TalTech/Optibet	23.9
2.	(United States) Jaron Martin	Avis Utilitas Rapla	20.6
3.	(United States) Demajeo Wiggins	Avis Utilitas Rapla	15.9
4.	(United States) Darryl Tucker	Avis Utilitas Rapla	15.9
5.	(Latvia) Jānis Kaufmanis	Valmiera Glass ViA	15.6

=== Rebounds ===
Rank	Name	Team	RPG
1.	(United States) Demajeo Wiggins	Avis Utilitas Rapla	10.6
2.	(United States) Darryl Tucker	Avis Utilitas Rapla	9.5
3.	(Latvia) Kristaps Dārgais	BK Ogre	9.4
4.	(United States) Emmanuel Wembi	Tartu Ülikool Maks & Moorits	8.9
5.	(Latvia) Zigmārs Raimo	Liepāja	8.7

=== Assists ===
Rank	Name	Team	APG
1.	(United States) Jaron Martin	Avis Utilitas Rapla	7.3
2.	(United States) Brandon Childress	TalTech/Optibet	6.6
3.	(Serbia) Aleksa Nikolić	Rakvere Tarvas	6.2
4.	(Latvia) Rinalds Sirsniņš	BK Ogre	6.0
5.	(Latvia) Kristers Zoriks	VEF Rīga	5.7

== Awards ==
=== Regular season MVP ===
Player	Team	Ref.
(Latvia) Kristaps Dārgais	(Latvia) BK Ogre	

=== Final Four MVP ===
Player	Team	Ref.
(United States) Jalen Riley	(Latvia) VEF Rīga	

=== Final Four All Star Five ===
Pos.	Player	Team
PG	(United States) Jalen Riley	(Latvia) VEF Rīga
PG	(Ukraine) Vitaliy Zotov	(Latvia) VEF Rīga
SG	(Estonia) Robert Valge	(Estonia) Pärnu Sadam
PF	(Finland) Alexander Madsen	(Latvia) VEF Rīga
C	(United States) Tyler Roberson	(Estonia) Viimsi/Sportland

=== MVP of the Month ===
Month	Player	Team	Ref.
2021
October	(Estonia) Mikk Jurkatamm	(Estonia) TalTech/Optibet	
November	(Latvia) Ronalds Zaķis	(Estonia) Viimsi/Sportland	
December	(United States) Jaron Martin	(Estonia) Avis Utilitas Rapla	
2022
January	(Latvia) Jānis Kaufmanis	(Latvia) Valmiera Glass ViA	
February	(United States) Brandon Childress	(Estonia) TalTech/Optibet	
March	(Latvia) Kristaps Dārgais	(Latvia) BK Ogre	

== Estonian and Latvian clubs in European competitions ==
Team	Competition	Progress
(Latvia) VEF Rīga	Champions League	Regular season (2–4) & Play-in (0–2)
(Estonia) Kalev/Cramo	Champions League	Regular season (2–4)
(Estonia) Pärnu Sadam	FIBA Europe Cup	Qualifying Round (1–1)

== Local Leagues ==
After the conclusion of season, each country played its own national championship play-offs. On May 19, VEF Rīga won its 9th Latvian championship. On May 26, Pärnu Sadam won their first ever Estonian championship

== See also ==
- 2021–22 KML season
