= 2022 LBL Play-offs =

Latvian national championships in basketball

LBL Play-offs
- Season: 2022
- Dates: 13 April – 19 May
- Games played: 24
- Teams: 6
- TV partner(s): TV4; Sportacentrs TV; LTV7

Regular season
- Season MVP: (Latvia) Kristers Zoriks

Finals
- Champions: VEF Rīga
- Runners-up: Ventspils
- Third place: BK Ogre
- Fourth place: Latvijas Universitāte

The 2022 LBL Play-offs was the tournament to determine the Latvian Basketball League champions for the 2021–22 season. All participating teams spent the regular season in Latvian-Estonian Basketball League, with the top six Latvian teams advancing to the LBL play-offs. The play-offs began on 13 April.

== Format ==
All six Latvian teams participated in 2021–22 Latvian–Estonian Basketball League regular season, determining seeding for the play-offs. Top two teams qualified for semi-finals, but other four teams started the play-off with quarterfinal series. Ouarterfinal, semifinal and bronze medal series are played in the best-of-five format, but final is played in the best-of-seven series.

== Teams ==
=== Venues and locations ===
Location of teams in 2022 LBL Play-offs

Team	Home city	Arena	Capacity
BK Ogre	Ogre	Ogre's Secondary School No.1	500
Latvijas Universitāte	Rīga	OSC	830
Liepāja	Liepāja	Liepāja Olympic Center	2542
Valmiera Glass ViA	Valmiera	Vidzeme Olympic Center	1500
VEF Rīga	Rīga	Arena Riga	11 200
VEF Rīga	Rīga	OSC	830
Ventspils	Ventspils	Ventspils Olympic Center	3085

=== Personnel and sponsorship ===
Team	Head coach	Captain	Kit manufacturer
BK Ogre	(Latvia) Uldis Švēde	(Latvia) Rinalds Sirsniņš	Erreà
Latvijas Universitāte	(Latvia) Guntis Endzels	(Latvia) Alberts Putāns	Nike
Liepāja	(Latvia) Artūrs Visockis-Rubenis	(Latvia) Roberts Krastiņš	Nike
Valmiera Glass ViA	(Latvia) Edmunds Valeiko	(Latvia) Ervīns Jonāts	Spalding
VEF Rīga	(Latvia) Jānis Gailītis	(Latvia) Artis Ate	
Ventspils	(Latvia) Gints Fogels	(Latvia) Andrejs Šeļakovs	Joma

== Seeding ==
Pos	Team	Pld	W	L	PF	PA	PD	PCT	Qualification or relegation
1	(Latvia) VEF Rīga	26	23	3	2346	1808	+538	.885	Advance to semifinals
2	(Latvia) Ventspils	26	21	5	2163	1909	+254	.808	Advance to semifinals
3	(Latvia) Ogre	26	16	10	2125	2011	+114	.615	Advance to quarterfinals
4	(Latvia) Valmiera Glass VIA	26	8	18	1925	2101	−176	.308	Advance to quarterfinals
5	(Latvia) Latvijas Universitāte	26	6	20	1809	2047	−238	.231	Advance to quarterfinals
6	(Latvia) Liepāja	26	5	21	1973	2186	−213	.192	Advance to quarterfinals

Updated to match(es) played on 26 March 2022. Source: estlatbl.com

== Play-off bracket ==
Quarter-finals
4	Valmiera Glass VIA	2
5	Latvijas Universitāte	3
3	Ogre	3
6	Liepāja	0

Semi-finals
1	VEF Rīga	3
5	Latvijas Universitāte	0
2	Ventspils	3
3	Ogre	2

Finals
1	VEF Rīga	4
2	Ventspils	1
Third place
5	Latvijas Universitāte	0
3	Ogre	3

== Quarter-finals ==
The quarter-finals are best-of-five series.

=== Valmiera Glass ViA vs. Latvijas Universitāte ===
13 April	Valmiera Glass/ViA	75–68 (Series: 1–0)	Latvijas Universitāte	Valmiera
19:00	Scoring by quarter: 15–21, 20–11, 17–18, 23–14
	Pts: Voinalovych 23; Rebs: Dubults 12; Asts: Kaufmanis, Clark 3 PIR: Voinalovych 25	Boxscore	Pts: Vīksne 16; Rebs: Mežulis 5 Asts: Putāns 5 PIR: Mežulis 17	Arena: Vidzeme Olympic Center; Attendance: 507; Referees: Kristaps Konstantinovs, Gatis Saliņš, Einārs Tukišs

16 April	Latvijas Universitāte	79–66 (Series: 1–1)	Valmiera Glass/ViA	Rīga
17:00	Scoring by quarter: 18–8, 20–24, 16–15, 25–16
	Pts: Vitoļskis 21; Rebs: Mežulis 10; Asts: Vitoļskis 6 PIR: Vitoļskis 28	Boxscore	Pts: Apsītis 15; Rebs: Apsītis 9 Asts: Liepiņš 4 PIR: Apsītis 18	Arena: Rimi Olympic Centre; Attendance: 150; Referees: Oļegs Latiševs, Ritvars Helmšteins, Juris Brūveris

19 April	Valmiera Glass/ViA	85–67 (Series: 2–1)	Latvijas Universitāte	Valmiera
19:00	Scoring by quarter: 27–18, 19–19, 18–14, 21–16
	Pts: Apsītis 26; Rebs: Apsītis 8 Asts: Clark 6 PIR: Apsītis 30	Boxscore	Pts: Vīksne 23; Rebs: Vīksne 8 Asts: Putāns 3 PIR: Vīksne 26	Arena: Vidzeme Olympic Center; Attendance: 562; Referees: Kristaps Konstantinovs, Gatis Saliņš, Elvis Binders-Čoders

21 April	Latvijas Universitāte	62–55 (Series: 2–2)	Valmiera Glass/ViA	Rīga
18:30	Scoring by quarter: 18–16, 15–10, 16–7, 13–22
	Pts: Vīksne 20; Rebs: Vīksne 10; Asts: Vitoļskis 4 PIR: Vīksne 29	Boxscore	Pts: Voinalovych 12; Rebs: Apsītis 8 Asts: Clark, Engers 3 PIR: Kaufmanis 10	Arena: Rimi Olympic Centre; Attendance: 73; Referees: Oskars Lucis, Andris Aunkrogers, Jānis Rozenbergs

23 April	Valmiera Glass/ViA	66–69 (Series: 2–3)	Latvijas Universitāte	Valmiera
19:00	Scoring by quarter: 24–10, 21–21, 8–24, 13–14
	Pts: Kaufmanis 26; Rebs: Clarck, Voinalovych 7 Asts: Kaufmanis 5 PIR: Kaufmanis 23	Boxscore	Pts: Vīksne 19; Rebs: Vīksne, Avotiņš, Mežulis 6 Asts: Putāns 4 PIR: Putāns 19	Arena: Vidzeme Olympic Center; Referees: Andris Aunkrogers, Gatis Saliņš, Ritvars Helmšteins

=== Ogre vs. Liepāja ===
14 April	Ogre	82–65 (Series: 1–0)	Liepāja	Ogre
19:00	Scoring by quarter: 29–20, 23–18, 11–13, 19–14
	Pts: Zēbergs 22; Rebs: Dārgais 10; Asts: Sirsniņš 8 PIR: Zēbergs 24	Boxscore	Pts: Raimo 15; Rebs: Raimo 9 Asts: Raimo 5 PIR: Raimo 25	Arena: Ogres 1. vidusskola Attendance: 197; Referees: Oskars Lucis, Andris Aunkrogers, Mārcis Senkēvičs

16 April	Liepāja	84–89 (Series: 0–2)	Ogre	Liepāja
14:00	Scoring by quarter: 22–17, 24–28, 25–15, 13–29
	Pts: Šiliņš 16; Rebs: Raimo 6 Asts: Raimo 6 PIR: Raimo 21	Boxscore	Pts: Jucikas 22; Rebs: Dārgais 9 Asts: Sirsniņš 11; PIR: Jucikas 20	Arena: Liepāja Olympic Center; Attendance: 250; Referees: Mārtiņš Kozlovskis, Kristaps Konstantinovs, Andris Petrovs

20 April	Ogre	84–69 (Series: 3–0)	Liepāja	Ogre
19:00	Scoring by quarter: 19–18, 17–21, 26–14, 22–16
	Pts: Nixon 16; Rebs: Dārgais 12; Asts: Sirsniņš 14; PIR: Dārgais 21	Boxscore	Pts: Krastiņš 16; Rebs: Raimo 8 Asts: Vītols 5 PIR: Raimo 17	Arena: Ogres 1. vidusskola Attendance: 250; Referees: Kristaps Konstantinovs, Ritvars Helmšteins, Rafiks Misirovs

== Semi-finals ==
The semi-finals are best-of-five series.

=== Ventspils vs. Ogre ===
26 April	Ventspils	83–90(OT) (Series: 0–1)	Ogre	Ventspils
19:00	Scoring by quarter: 24–22, 13–18, 28–18, 14–21, Overtime: 4–11
	Pts: Ausējs 21; Rebs: Krestinin 10; Asts: Ausējs, Mediss, Thomas 3 PIR: Thomas 17	Boxscore	Pts: Antrops 15; Rebs: Dārgais 17; Asts: Sirsniņš 9 PIR: Dārgais 28	Arena: Ventspils Olympic Center; Attendance: 1470; Referees: Gatis Saliņš, Ritvars Helmšteins, Jānis Vārna

29 April	Ogre	78–85 (Series: 1–1)	Ventspils	Ogre
19:00	Scoring by quarter: 26–18, 20–28, 17–17, 15–22
	Pts: Jucikas 19; Rebs: Dārgais 9 Asts: Sirsniņš 7 PIR: Dārgais 18	Boxscore	Pts: Ķilps 22; Rebs: Krestinin 10; Asts: Ausējs 6 PIR: Jaunzems 27	Arena: Ogres 1. vidusskola Attendance: 943; Referees: Oskars Lucis, Einārs Tukišs, Rafiks Misirovs

2 May	Ventspils	61–76 (Series: 1–2)	Ogre	Ventspils
19:00	Scoring by quarter: 14–13, 7–19, 17–21, 23–23
	Pts: Jaunzems 15; Rebs: Ausējs, Jaunzems, Ķilps 6 Asts: Ausējs, Zotovs, Ķilps 3 PIR: Jaunzems 14	Boxscore	Pts: Zēbergs 14; Rebs: Dārgais 9 Asts: Nixon, Dārgais 5 PIR: Dārgais 15	Arena: Ventspils Olympic Center; Attendance: 1650; Referees: Mārtiņš Kozlovskis, Andris Aunkrogers, Kristaps Konstantinovs

4 May	Ogre	64–89 (Series: 2–2)	Ventspils	Ogre
15:00	Scoring by quarter: 17–23, 13–23, 18–21, 16–22
	Pts: Nixon 15; Rebs: Dārgais 9 Asts: Nixon 5 PIR: Nixon 16	Boxscore	Pts: Ķilps 17; Rebs: Thomas, Krestinin 6 Asts: Mediss 5 PIR: Thomas 17	Arena: Ogres 1. vidusskola Attendance: 1242; Referees: Oskars Lucis, Kristaps Konstantinovs, Ritvars Helmšteins

6 May	Ventspils	77–73 (Series: 3–2)	Ogre	Ventspils
19:00	Scoring by quarter: 17–22, 18–18, 21–8, 21–25
	Pts: Ausējs 21; Rebs: Sīpoliņš 7 Asts: Ausējs, Thomas 5 PIR: Thomas 19	Boxscore	Pts: Dārgais, Antrops 17; Rebs: Dārgais 17; Asts: Dārgais 6 PIR: Dārgais 35	Arena: Ventspils Olympic Center; Attendance: 2200; Referees: Oļegs Latiševs, Andris Aunkrogers, Gatis Saliņš

=== VEF Rīga vs. Latvijas Universitāte ===
25 April	VEF Rīga	100–62 (Series: 1–0)	Latvijas Universitāte	Rīga
19:30	Scoring by quarter: 24–14, 31–17, 18–18, 27–13
	Pts: Zoriks 18; Rebs: Madsen 9 Asts: Zoriks 8 PIR: Zoriks 25	Boxscore	Pts: Vīksne 22; Rebs: Putāns 7 Asts: Vitoļskis 4 PIR: Vīksne 22	Arena: Rimi Olympic Center; Attendance: 400; Referees: Kristaps Konstantinovs, Mārcis Senkēvičs, Juris Brūveris

28 April	Latvijas Universitāte	64–114 (Series: 0–2)	VEF Rīga	Rīga
20:00	Scoring by quarter: 19–31, 15–26, 16–28, 14–29
	Pts: Kampuss 13; Rebs: Briedis, Mežulis, Vīksne 4 Asts: Briedis 4 PIR: Briedis 12	Boxscore	Pts: Riley 20; Rebs: Madsen 8 Asts: Zoriks 10; PIR: Madsen 25	Arena: Rimi Olympic Center; Attendance: 150; Referees: Andris Aunkrogers, Einārs Tukišs, Elvis Binders-Čoders

1 May	VEF Rīga	87–78 (Series: 3–0)	Latvijas Universitāte	Rīga
17:00	Scoring by quarter: 22–23, 24–15, 21–26, 20–14
	Pts: Zoriks 22; Rebs: Miška 9 Asts: Riley 6 PIR: Zoriks 23	Boxscore	Pts: Miglinieks 14; Rebs: R.Avotiņš, Strautiņš 5 Asts: Vitoļskis 10; PIR: Miglinieks 12	Arena: Rimi Olympic Center; Attendance: 250; Referees: Gatis Saliņš, Ritvars Helmšteins, Andris Petrovs

== Bronze serie ==
The bronze medal serie is best-of-five series.

=== Ogre vs. Latvijas Universitāte ===
9 May	Ogre	72–60 (Series: 1–0)	Latvijas Universitāte	Ogre, Latvia
19:00	Scoring by quarter: 19–16, 23–19, 10–14, 20–11
	Pts: Zēbergs 23; Rebs: Dārgais 12; Asts: Dārgais 7 PIR: Dārgais 23	Boxscore	Pts: Vīksne 20; Rebs: Vitoļskis, Putāns 6 Asts: Vitoļskis, Mežulis 3 PIR: Vitoļskis 19	Arena: Ogres 1. vidusskola Attendance: 184; Referees: Andris Aunkrogers, Gatis Saliņš, Juris Brūveris

12 May	Latvijas Universitāte	51–69 (Series: 0–2)	Ogre	Rīga
20:15	Scoring by quarter: 8–26, 15–17, 11–12, 17–14
	Pts: Vīksne 11; Rebs: Mežulis 7 Asts: Vīksne 5 PIR: Vīksne, Mežulis 10	Boxscore	Pts: Antrops 17; Rebs: Dārgais 13; Asts: Antrops 7 PIR: Antrops 22	Arena: Rimi Olympic Sports Centre; Attendance: 159; Referees: Kristaps Konstantinovs, Ritvars Helmšteins, Jānis Vārna

15 May	Ogre	72–64 (Series: 3–0)	Latvijas Universitāte	Ogre, Latvia
17:00	Scoring by quarter: 21–20, 18–19, 11–12, 22–13
	Pts: Antrops 33; Rebs: Dārgais 12; Asts: Dārgais 7 PIR: Dārgais 28	Boxscore	Pts: Vīksne 10; Rebs: Vīksne 7 Asts: Vitoļskis 4 PIR: Vīksne 14	Arena: Ogres 1. vidusskola Attendance: 120; Referees: Oļegs Latiševs, Gatis Saliņš, Mārcis Senkēvičs

== Final ==
The Final is best-of-seven series.

=== VEF vs. Ventspils ===
8 May	VEF Rīga	94–80 (Series: 1–0)	Ventspils	Rīga
19:30	Scoring by quarter: 24–24, 25–23, 16–12, 29–21
	Pts: Zoriks, Riley, Madsen 16; Rebs: Madsen 13; Asts: Zoriks, Riley 5 PIR: Madsen 26	Boxscore	Pts: Ausējs 14; Rebs: Thomas 8 Asts: Jaunzems, Thomas 4 PIR: Thomas 19	Arena: Rimi Olympic Center; Attendance: 800; Referees: Oļegs Latiševs, Kristaps Konstantinovs, Jānis Rozenbergs

11 May	Ventspils	93–88 (Series: 1–1)	VEF Rīga	Ventspils
19:30	Scoring by quarter: 22–23, 26–19, 21–22
	Pts: Thomas 19; Rebs: Krestinin 6 Asts: Ausējs 6 PIR: Thomas 20	Boxscore	Pts: Zoriks 27; Rebs: Madsen 13; Asts: Zoriks 4 PIR: Madsen 24	Arena: Ventspils Olympic Center; Attendance: 1500; Referees: Oskars Lucis, Andris Aunkrogers, Einārs Tukišs

14 May	VEF Rīga	vs. (Series: 2–1)	Ventspils	Rīga
17:30	Scoring by quarter: 19–23, 27–14, 19–17, 24–11
	Pts: Hammonds 25; Rebs: Hammonds 10; Asts: Zoriks 5 PIR: Hammonds 34	[Boxscore]	Pts: Sīpoliņš 16; Rebs: Majauskas 6 Asts: Thomas 8 PIR: Sīpoliņš 15	Arena: Rimi Olympic Center; Attendance: 1200; Referees: Kristaps Konstantinovs, Gatis Saliņš, Ritvars Helmšteins

17 May	Ventspils	74–98 (Series: 1–3)	VEF Rīga	Ventspils
18:00	Scoring by quarter: 18–23, 24–20, 13–32, 19–20
	Pts: Krestinin 13; Rebs: Krestinin 8 Asts: Ausējs, Thomas 4 PIR: Krestinin 14	Boxscore	Pts: Madsen 16; Rebs: Hammonds 7 Asts: Zoriks 8 PIR: Hammonds, Zoriks 20	Arena: Ventspils Olympic Center; Attendance: 1870; Referees: Kristaps Konstantinovs, Andris Aunkrogers, Ritvars Helmšteins

19 May	VEF Rīga	93–92 (Series: 4–1)	Ventspils	Rīga
17:40	Scoring by quarter: 25–18, 15–32, 27–18, 26–24
	Pts: Zoriks 20; Rebs: Madsen, Miška 7 Asts: Zoriks 10; PIR: Zoriks 24	Boxscore	Pts: Thomas 18; Rebs: Krestinin 7 Asts: Ausējs 7 PIR: Sīpoliņš 21	Arena: Rimi Olympic Center; Attendance: 900; Referees: Mārtiņš Kozlovskis, Oskars Lucis, Gatis Saliņš

== Statistics ==
As of May 19, 2022.

=== Efficiency ===
Rank	Name	Team	APG
1.	(Latvia) Kristers Zoriks	VEF Rīga	21.38
2.	(Latvia) Zigmārs Raimo	Liepāja	21.00
3.	(Latvia) Kristaps Dārgais	Ogre	20.45
4.	(Finland) Alexander Madsen	VEF Rīga	17.88
5.	(Latvia) Dāvids Vīksne	Latvijas Universitāte	16.36

=== Points ===
Rank	Name	Team	PPG
1.	(Latvia) Kristers Zoriks	VEF Rīga	17.50
2.	(Latvia) Dāvids Vīksne	Latvijas Universitāte	16.09
3.	(Ukraine) Andreii Voinalovych	Valmiera Glass ViA	14.80
4.	(Latvia) Jānis Kaufmanis	Valmiera Glass ViA	14.00
5.	(United States) Jalen Riley	VEF Rīga	13.88

=== Rebounds ===
Rank	Name	Team	RPG
1.	(Latvia) Kristaps Dārgais	Ogre	11.37
2.	(Finland) Alexander Madsen	VEF Rīga	7.75
3.	(Latvia) Zigmārs Raimo	Liepāja	7.67
4.	(Latvia) Klāvs Dubults	Valmiera Glass ViA	7.33
5.	(Latvia) Kārlis Apsītis	Valmiera Glass ViA	6.20

=== Assists ===
Rank	Name	Team	APG
1.	(Latvia) Kristers Zoriks	VEF Rīga	6.50
2.	(Latvia) Rinalds Sirsniņš	Ogre	5.78
3.	(Latvia) Zigmārs Raimo	Liepāja	4.67
4.	(Latvia) Kristaps Dārgais	BK Ogre	4.64
5.	(Latvia) Artūrs Ausējs	BK Ventspils	4.30

== Final standings ==
Rank	Team	Record
1st place, gold medalist(s)	VEF Rīga	7–1
2nd place, silver medalist(s)	BK Ventspils	4–6
3rd place, bronze medalist(s)	BK Ogre	8–3
4th	Latvijas Universitāte	3–8
5th	Valmiera Glass ViA	2–3
6th	BK Liepāja	0–3
