= 2020–21 Latvian–Estonian Basketball League =

Latvian–Estonian Basketball League
- Season: 2020–21
- Duration: 3 October 2020 – 11 April 2021
- Games played: 164
- Teams: 13
- TV partner(s): Best4Sport TV, Delfi TV

Regular season
- Season MVP: (United States) Maurice Kemp

Finals
- Champions: (Estonia) Kalev/Cramo
- Runners-up: (Latvia) VEF Rīga
- Third place: (Latvia) Ogre
- Fourth place: (Estonia) Avis Utilitas Rapla

Statistical leaders
Points	(United States) Brandon Childress	22.78
Rebounds	(United States) Tyler Roberson	9.00
Assists	(Latvia) Renars Birkans	6.63

Records
- Biggest home win: Kalev/Cramo 110–46 Tartu Ülikool (2 December 2020)
- Biggest away win: Latvijas Universitāte 42–86 VEF Rīga (4 December 2020); Ventspils 59–103 VEF Rīga (28 March 2021)
- Highest scoring: Ventspils 113–90 Valmiera Glass/ViA (24 October 2020)

The 2020–21 Latvian–Estonian Basketball League, known as Paf Latvian–Estonian Basketball League for sponsorship reasons, was the 3rd season of the Latvian–Estonian Basketball League, the combined top basketball division of Latvia and Estonia.

The season began on 3 October 2020 and ended in 11 April 2021. The Final 6 was played at the Elektrum Olimpiskais Sporta centrs in Riga, Latvia, with Kalev/Cramo winning its first title.

== Competition format ==
It was planned, that the competition format would follow the usual double round-robin format: all the teams would play each other twice, once at home and once away, for a total of 24 games; teams would have been ranked by total points, with the eight highest-ranked teams advancing to the quarter-finals; the quarterfinal series would have been played to two wins (best-of-three); the winning teams would determine the champion in a Final Four tournament.
Due to the COVID-19 pandemic risks, it was planned, that from October till 6 December teams would play only within the respective country.

It was announced in 11 November, that after 6 December due to the increasing spread of coronavirus in the region teams will continue competing within their respective country (thefore, playing 3rd and 4th lap), and so no international games will be played in the Regular season. Discussions on the play-off format are still ongoing.

== Teams ==
Location of the 2020–21 Latvian–Estonian Basketball League teams

13 teams, 7 from Estonia and 6 from Latvia, are contesting the league in the 2020–21 season.

=== Venues and locations ===
Team	Home city	Arena	Capacity
(Estonia) Avis Utilitas Rapla	Rapla	Sadolin Sports Hall	1000
(Estonia) Kalev/Cramo	Tallinn	Kalev Sports Hall / Saku Suurhall	1780 / 7200
(Latvia) Latvijas Universitāte	Rīga	Elektrum Olympic Sports Center	830
(Latvia) Liepāja	Liepāja	Liepāja Olympic Center	2542
(Latvia) Ogre	Ogre	Ogre 1st Secondary School	500
(Estonia) Pärnu Sadam	Pärnu	Pärnu Sports Hall	1820
(Estonia) Rakvere Tarvas	Rakvere	Rakvere Sports Hall	2747
(Estonia) Tallinna Kalev/TLÜ	Tallinn	Sõle Sports Centre	
(Estonia) TalTech	Tallinn	TalTech Sports Hall	1000
(Estonia) Tartu Ülikool	Tartu	University of Tartu Sports Hall	2600
(Latvia) Valmiera Glass VIA	Valmiera	Vidzeme Olympic Center	1500
(Latvia) VEF Rīga	Rīga	Elektrum Olympic Sports Center / Arena Riga	830 / 11 200
(Latvia) Ventspils	Ventspils	Ventspils Olympic Center	3085

=== Personnel and kits ===
Team	Head coach	Captain	Kit manufacturer	Main sponsor
(Estonia) Avis Utilitas Rapla	(Estonia) Toomas Annuk	(Latvia) Roberts Freimanis	Spalding	
(Estonia) Kalev/Cramo	(Latvia) Roberts Štelmahers	(Estonia) Martin Dorbek	Nike	
(Latvia) Latvijas Universitāte	(Latvia) Guntis Endzels	(Latvia) Kārlis Žunda	Nike	
(Latvia) Liepāja	(Latvia) Artūrs Visockis-Rubenis	(Latvia) Roberts Krastiņš	Erreà	
(Latvia) Ogre	(Latvia) Nikolajs Mazurs	(Latvia) Rinalds Sirsniņš	Erreà	
(Estonia) Pärnu Sadam	(Estonia) Heiko Rannula	(Latvia) Lauris Blaus	Joma	
(Estonia) Rakvere Tarvas	(Latvia) Juris Umbraško	(Estonia) Renato Lindmets	Spalding	
(Estonia) Tallinna Kalev/TLÜ	(Estonia) Valdo Lips	(Estonia) Mario Paiste	Nike	
(Estonia) TalTech	(Estonia) Kris Killing	(Estonia) Oliver Metsalu	Nike	
(Estonia) Tartu Ülikool	(Estonia) Toomas Kandimaa	(Estonia) Robin Kivi	Spalding	
(Latvia) Valmiera Glass VIA	(Latvia) Roberts Zeile	(Latvia) Edmunds Elksnis	Spalding	
(Latvia) VEF Rīga	(Latvia) Jānis Gailītis	(Latvia) Artis Ate	Adidas	
(Latvia) Ventspils	(Latvia) Gints Fogels	(Latvia) Māris Gulbis	Joma	

== Estonia ==
=== League table ===
Pos	Team	Pld	W	L	PF	PA	PD	PCT	Qualification
1	(Estonia) Kalev/Cramo	23	21	2	2066	1619	+447	.913	Advance to Final 6 semifinals
2	(Estonia) Pärnu Sadam	24	17	7	1938	1830	+108	.708	Advance to Final 6 quarterfinals
3	(Estonia) Avis Utilitas Rapla	24	13	11	1862	1793	+69	.542	Advance to Final 6 quarterfinals
4	(Estonia) TalTech	24	11	13	1756	1899	−143	.458	
5	(Estonia) Rakvere Tarvas	23	10	13	1806	1818	−12	.435	
6	(Estonia) Tartu Ülikool	24	8	16	1734	1966	−232	.333	
7	(Estonia) Tallinna Kalev/TLÜ	24	3	21	1871	2108	−237	.125	

Updated to match(es) played on 4 April 2021. Source: estlatbl.com

=== Results ===
Home \ Away	RAP	KAL	PAR	RAK	TLU	TCH	TRT	RAP	KAL	PAR	RAK	TLU	TCH	TRT
Avis Utilitas Rapla	—	82–80	79–86	76–84	92–76	50–57	86–59	—	78–94	88–93	65–73	81–71	102–60	103–69
Kalev/Cramo	76–74	—	81–60	100–74	98–88	113–59	110–46	79–62	—	76–71	0	99–93	96–63	96–54
Pärnu Sadam	83–69	79–74	—	81–69	98–92	77–69	76–62	78–58	82–93	—	56–96	93–55	92–89	87–65
Rakvere Tarvas	81–89	67–81	72–76	—	82–75	82–68	85–78	58–65	70–102	86–84	—	96–87	70–79	69–73
Tallinna Kalev/TLÜ	83–89	74–92	71–74	94–93	—	85–65	73–100	83–85	78–100	81–92	60–72	—	74–96	88–80
TalTech	49–63	67–81	65–69	73–71	88–67	—	67–79	77–74	70–84	85–80	90–85	89–83	—	74–66
Tartu Ülikool Maks & Moorits	74–76	60–78	88–80	72–93	75–67	64–71	—	70–76	68–83	67–91	94–78	79–73	92–86	—

Updated to match(es) played on 4 April 2021. Source: estlatbl.com
Legend: Blue = home team win; Red = away team win.

== Latvia ==
=== League table ===
Pos	Team	Pld	W	L	PF	PA	PD	PCT	Qualification
1	(Latvia) VEF Rīga	25	23	2	2264	1768	+496	.920	Advance to Final 6 semifinals
2	(Latvia) Ventspils	25	15	10	2071	2044	+27	.600	Advance to Final 6 quarterfinals
3	(Latvia) Ogre	25	14	11	2028	1922	+106	.560	Advance to Final 6 quarterfinals
4	(Latvia) Liepāja	25	12	13	1988	2036	−48	.480	
5	(Latvia) Valmiera Glass/ViA	25	7	18	1877	2145	−268	.280	
6	(Latvia) Latvijas Universitāte	25	4	21	1698	2011	−313	.160	

Updated to match(es) played on 3 April 2021. Source: estlatbl.com

=== Results ===
Home \ Away	LIE	OGR	VEN	LUN	VLM	VEF	LIE	OGR	VEN	LUN	VLM	VEF	LIE	OGR	VEN	LUN	VLM	VEF
Liepāja	—	73–78	91–92	79–62	79–72	81–95	—	72–91	92–96	87–80	69–73	74–85	—	—	—	86–71	93–62	—
Ogre	94–77	—	76–83	83–58	82–75	63–81	92–74	—	82–88	69–60	82–73	72–58	75–98	—	100–92	—	—	—
Ventspils	73–64	82–81	—	91–85	113–90	84–97	78–79	65–93	—	93–58	84–65	87–99	73–71	—	—	—	—	59–103
Latvijas Universitāte	82–83	67–78	69–78	—	70–85	42–86	65–86	70–66	65–69	—	61–66	60–77	—	73–64	88–76	—	—	63–85
Valmiera Glass/ViA	86–88	67–86	65–70	83–73	—	64–93	72–89	90–85	87–81	62–65	—	81–87	—	77–103	66–96	100–93	—	—
VEF Rīga	104–63	83–76	96–93	95–54	105–90	—	77–83	89–81	82–75	84–64	94–57	—	108–57	97–76	—	—	104–69	—

Updated to match(es) played on 3 April 2021. Source: estlatbl.com
Legend: Blue = home team win; Red = away team win.

== Final 6 ==
Final 6, which featured 3 of the highest ranked teams from each country, with highest ranked team from each country receiving a bye to semifinals, was held in Riga, Latvia from April 8 to April 11

Quarterfinal; 8 April
2	(Latvia) Ventspils	69
3	(Estonia) Avis Utilitas Rapla	79
2	(Estonia) Pärnu Sadam	68
3	(Latvia) Ogre	77

Semifinals; 10 April
1	(Estonia) Kalev/Cramo	83
3	(Estonia) Avis Utilitas Rapla	63
1	(Latvia) VEF Rīga	90
3	(Latvia) Ogre	85

Final; April 11
1	(Estonia) Kalev/Cramo	86
1	(Latvia) VEF Rīga	75
Bronze medal game
3	(Estonia) Avis Utilitas Rapla	73
3	(Latvia) Ogre	75

=== Individual awards ===
Tournament MVP

- Maurice Kemp (Kalev/Cramo)

All-Star Five

- Maurice Kemp (Kalev/Cramo)
- Janari Jõesaar (Kalev/Cramo)
- Brandon Childress (Avis Utilitas Rapla)
- Kyle Allman (VEF Rīga)
- Rihards Kuksiks (Ogre)
