= 2018–19 Latvian–Estonian Basketball League =

Estonian-Latvian Basketball League
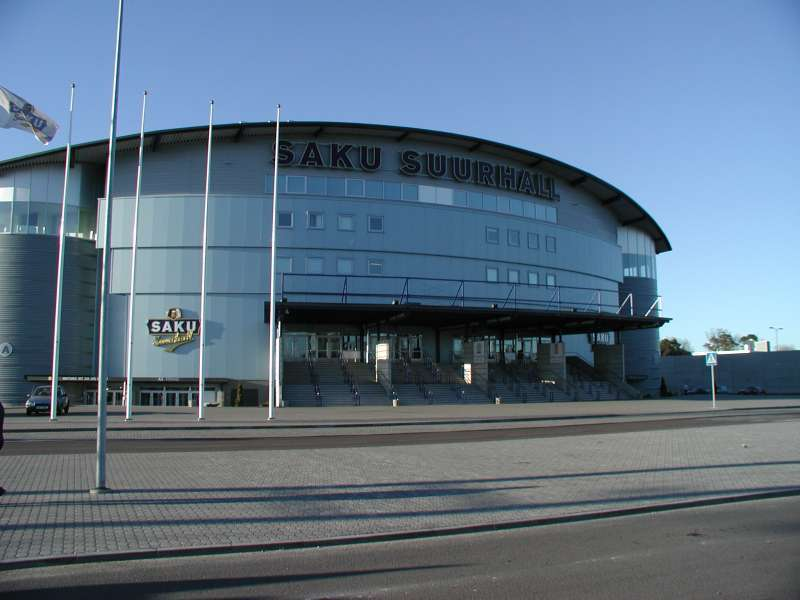
- Saku Suurhall in Tallinn hosted the Final Four
- Season: 2018–19
- Duration: 28 September 2018 – 6 April 2019
- Games played: 222
- Teams: 15
- TV partners: Best4Sport TV, TTV, Delfi TV

Regular season
- Season MVP: (Latvia) Rihards Lomažs

Finals
- Champions: (Latvia) Ventspils (1st title)
- Runners-up: (Latvia) VEF Rīga
- Third place: (Estonia) Kalev/Cramo
- Fourth place: (Latvia) Ogre

Statistical leaders
Points	(United States) Justin Johnson	21.4
Rebounds	(Latvia) Jurijs Aleksejevs	9.3
Assists	(United States) Tony Wroten	7.6

The 2018–19 Latvian–Estonian Basketball League, known as OlyBet Latvian–Estonian Basketball League for sponsorship reasons, was the inaugural season of the newly formed Latvian–Estonian Basketball League, the combined top basketball division of Latvia and Estonia.

The season began on 28 September 2018, with the 2018 Estonian champions Kalev/Cramo hosting a game against the 2018 Latvian champions Ventspils. The Final Four was played at the Saku Suurhall in Tallinn, Estonia, with Ventspils winning the inaugural title.

== Competition format ==
The competition format follows the usual double round-robin format. During the course of the regular season, which lasts from 28 September 2018 to 24 March 2018, all the teams play each other twice, once at home and once away, for a total of 28 games. Teams receive two points for a win and one point for a loss. Teams are ranked by total points, with the eight highest-ranked teams advancing to the double-legged quarter-finals. The winning teams will determine the champion in a Final Four tournament.

== Teams ==
Location of the 2018–19 Latvian–Estonian Basketball League teams

15 teams, 7 from Estonia and 8 from Latvia, are contesting the league in the 2018–19 season.

=== Venues and locations ===
Team	Home city	Arena
(Estonia) Avis Utilitas Rapla	Rapla	Sadolin Sports Hall
(Latvia) Jūrmala Betsafe	Jūrmala	Jurmala State Gymnasium Sports Hall
(Latvia) Jēkabpils/SMScredit.lv	Jēkabpils	Jēkabpils Sports Hall
(Estonia) Kalev/Cramo	Tallinn	Kalev Sports Hall
(Latvia) Latvijas Universitāte	Rīga	Elektrum Olympic Sports Center
(Latvia) Liepāja	Liepāja	Liepāja Olympic Center
(Latvia) Ogre	Ogre	Ogre 1st Secondary School
(Estonia) Pärnu Sadam	Pärnu	Pärnu Sports Hall
(Estonia) Tallinna Kalev/TLÜ	Tallinn	Sõle Sports Centre
(Estonia) TalTech	Tallinn	TalTech Sports Hall
(Estonia) Tartu Ülikool	Tartu	University of Tartu Sports Hall
(Estonia) Valga-Valka/Maks & Moorits	Valga	Valga Sports Hall
(Latvia) Valmiera Glass VIA	Valmiera	Vidzeme Olympic Center
(Latvia) VEF Rīga	Rīga	Elektrum Olympic Sports Center
(Latvia) Ventspils	Ventspils	Ventspils Olympic Center

=== Personnel and sponsorship ===
Team	Head coach	Captain	Kit manufacturer	Shirt sponsor
(Estonia) Avis Utilitas Rapla	(Estonia) Toomas Annuk	(Estonia) Indrek Kajupank	Spalding	Fenikss Casino
(Latvia) Jūrmala Betsafe	(Latvia) Mārtiņš Gulbis	(Latvia) Uģis Pinete	Spalding	Betsafe
(Latvia) Jēkabpils/SMScredit.lv	(Serbia) Marko Žarković	(Latvia) Rodrigo Būmeisters	Joma	PATA
(Estonia) Kalev/Cramo	(Lithuania) Donaldas Kairys	(Estonia) Kristjan Kangur	Nike	Cramo
(Latvia) Latvijas Universitāte	(Latvia) Guntis Endzels	(Latvia) Linards Jaunzems	Nike	University of Latvia
(Latvia) Liepāja	(Latvia) Artūrs Štālbergs	(Latvia) Mareks Jurevičus	Erreà	
(Latvia) Ogre	(Latvia) Artūrs Visockis-Rubenis	(Latvia) Kristaps Dārgais	Erreà	Kronus
(Estonia) Pärnu Sadam	(Estonia) Heiko Rannula	(Estonia) Rannar Raap	Nike	Port of Pärnu
(Estonia) Tallinna Kalev/TLÜ	(Estonia) Martin Müürsepp	(Estonia) Mario Paiste	Nike	City of Tallinn
(Estonia) TalTech	(Estonia) Rait Käbin	(Estonia) Jaan Puidet	Nike	Tallinn University of Technology
(Estonia) Tartu Ülikool	(Estonia) Priit Vene	(Lithuania) Julius Kazakauskas	Nike	University of Tartu
(Estonia) Valga-Valka/Maks & Moorits	(Russia) Mikhail Karpenko	(Estonia) Timo Eichfuss	Teamshield	SynotTip
(Latvia) Valmiera Glass ViA	(Latvia) Roberts Zeile	(Latvia) Jānis Kaufmanis	Spalding	Valmiera Glass
(Latvia) VEF Rīga	(Latvia) Jānis Gailītis	(Latvia) Mareks Mejeris	Adidas	Mākslai vajag telpu
(Latvia) Ventspils	(Latvia) Roberts Štelmahers	(Latvia) Māris Gulbis	Joma	Port of Ventspils

== Regular season ==
=== League table ===
Pos	Team	Pld	W	L	PF	PA	PD	PCT	Qualification
1	(Latvia) Ventspils	28	27	1	2516	1996	+520	.964	Advanced to play-offs and national championships
2	(Latvia) VEF Rīga	28	26	2	2567	1931	+636	.929	Advanced to play-offs and national championships
3	(Estonia) Kalev/Cramo	28	25	3	2583	2046	+537	.893	Advanced to play-offs and national championships
4	(Latvia) Ogre	28	18	10	2533	2307	+226	.643	Advanced to play-offs and national championships
5	(Estonia) TalTech	28	16	12	2306	2297	+9	.571	Advanced to play-offs and national championships
6	(Estonia) Tartu Ülikool	28	14	14	2202	2249	−47	.500	Advanced to play-offs and national championships
7	(Estonia) Avis Utilitas Rapla	28	13	15	2242	2284	−42	.464 (Note: Rapla 2–2 (+10); Pärnu 2–2 (-1); Jūrmala 2–2 (-9))	Advanced to play-offs and national championships
8	(Estonia) Pärnu Sadam	28	13	15	2156	2222	−66	.464	Advanced to play-offs and national championships
9	(Latvia) Jūrmala Betsafe	28	13	15	2175	2232	−57	.464	Qualification for Latvian championship
10	(Estonia) Tallinna Kalev/TLÜ	28	12	16	2276	2250	+26	.429	Qualification for Estonian championship
11	(Latvia) Latvijas Universitāte	28	9	19	1972	2193	−221	.321	Qualification for Latvian championship
12	(Latvia) Valmiera Glass/ViA	28	8	20	2214	2414	−200	.286	Qualification for Latvian championship
13	(Latvia) Liepāja	28	7	21	2151	2500	−349	.250 (Note: Liepāja 2–0 Valga-Valka)	
14	(Estonia) Valga-Valka/Maks & Moorits	28	7	21	1976	2286	−310	.250	
15	(Latvia) Jēkabpils/SMScredit.lv	28	2	26	1884	2546	−662	.071	

Source: estlatbl.com

=== Results ===
Home \ Away	RAP	JUR	JEK	KAL	LAT	LIE	OGR	PAR	TLU	TCH	TRT	VLG	VIA	VEF	VEN
Avis Utilitas Rapla	—	68–71	104–80	77–84	77–74	99–96	83–95	94–85	69–87	71–89	97–71	81–83	100–88	71–77	72–93
Jūrmala Betsafe	67–60	—	79–61	66–78	80–62	101–96	90–84	89–93	71–74	82–85	89–95	66–85	81–69	73–96	62–72
Jēkabpils/SMScredit.lv	69–79	72–77	—	64–102	57–90	71–63	68–113	78–85	54–88	65–76	74–93	61–79	49–71	68–123	58–115
Kalev/Cramo	81–68	103–84	104–56	—	94–69	97–57	118–92	88–77	93–92	107–68	104–71	97–59	88–79	82–91	97–85
Latvijas Universitāte	75–97	55–62	89–76	71–97	—	78–70	60–86	75–70	53–66	78–76	72–77	76–84	80–71	64–91	61–89
Liepāja	82–89	81–87	81–65	80–107	70–78	—	75–93	62–93	94–88	91–98	89–78	85–76	73–71	70–106	66–110
Ogre	84–77	104–83	106–72	78–93	62–67	95–68	—	99–74	94–77	97–102	99–89	86–73	92–71	75–90	92–94
Pärnu Sadam	62–73	87–72	76–67	66–93	82–64	96–83	79–86	—	70–65	48–70	76–82	91–79	87–82	72–76	72–82
Tallinna Kalev/TLÜ	83–86	96–99	85–82	72–79	84–88	73–60	83–81	85–91	—	76–81	82–84	87–61	120–109	83–93	65–84
TalTech	82–78	80–75	110–71	66–100	84–78	99–82	84–92	91–84	83–99	—	86–94	78–66	99–73	72–95	78–92
Tartu Ülikool	85–76	79–59	101–55	58–77	82–64	86–68	91–94	52–68	75–66	79–68	—	71–72	70–76	75–81	59–85
Valga-Valka/Maks & Moorits	70–85	67–90	59–70	54–88	62–58	80–102	65–81	70–79	78–90	64–87	79–83	—	74–69	54–82	65–82
Valmiera Glass ViA	69–82	77–103	84–82	71–84	87–63	87–93	71–86	77–75	63–86	86–75	106–98	88–84	—	76–95	97–108
VEF Rīga	102–68	81–59	102–63	84–66	82–70	102–47	111–108	91–56	95–56	86–72	99–41	96–78	92–61	—	89–90
Ventspils	100–61	72–58	112–76	91–82	78–60	97–67	99–79	97–62	80–68	88–67	88–83	77–56	95–85	61–59	—

Source: estlatbl.com
Legend: Blue = home team win; Red = away team win.

== Play-offs ==
The quarter-finals were played with a double-legged format while the semi-finals and final in a Final Four format was hosted at the Saku Suurhall in Tallinn, Estonia.

=== Bracket ===
Quarter-finals; 27 March – 2 April
(Estonia) Pärnu Sadam	80	80	160
(Latvia) Ventspils	83	94	177
(Estonia) TalTech	87	59	146
(Latvia) Ogre	81	85	166
(Estonia) Avis Utilitas Rapla	65	71	136
(Latvia) VEF Rīga	90	121	211
(Estonia) Tartu Ülikool	59	59	118
(Estonia) Kalev/Cramo	84	96	180

Semi-finals; 5 April
(Latvia) Ventspils	84
(Latvia) Ogre	80
(Latvia) VEF Rīga	90
(Estonia) Kalev/Cramo	80

Final; 6 April
(Latvia) Ventspils	102
(Latvia) VEF Rīga	80
Third place
(Latvia) Ogre	85
(Estonia) Kalev/Cramo	87

=== Quarter-finals ===
Team 1	Agg.	Team 2	1st leg	2nd leg
Pärnu Sadam (Estonia)	160–177	(Latvia) Ventspils	80–83	80–94
Avis Utilitas Rapla (Estonia)	136–211	(Latvia) VEF Rīga	65–90	71–121
Tartu Ülikool (Estonia)	118–180	(Estonia) Kalev/Cramo	59–84	59–96
TalTech (Estonia)	146–166	(Latvia) Ogre	87–81	59–85

=== Semi-finals ===
Team 1	Score	Team 2
Ventspils (Latvia)	84–80	(Latvia) Ogre
VEF Rīga (Latvia)	90–80	(Estonia) Kalev/Cramo

=== Third place game ===
Team 1	Score	Team 2
Ogre (Latvia)	85–87	(Estonia) Kalev/Cramo

=== Final ===
Team 1	Score	Team 2
Ventspils (Latvia)	102–80	(Latvia) VEF Rīga

== Individual statistics ==
Players qualify to this category by having at least 50% games played.

=== Points ===
Rank	Name	Team	Games	Points	PPG
1	(United States) Justin Johnson	(Latvia) Liepāja	27	579	21.44
2	(Latvia) Jānis Kaufmanis	(Latvia) Valmiera Glass ViA	28	554	19.79
3	(Lithuania) Arnas Velička	(Estonia) Tartu Ülikool	29	551	19.00
4	(Latvia) Linards Jaunzems	(Latvia) Latvijas Universitāte	25	463	18.52
5	(Estonia) Toomas Raadik	(Estonia) TalTech	30	531	17.70

=== Rebounds ===
Rank	Name	Team	Games	Rebounds	RPG
1	(Latvia) Jurijs Aleksejevs	(Latvia) Jēkabpils/SMScredit.lv / (Latvia) Jūrmala Betsafe	27	250	9.26
2	(Lithuania) Julius Kazakauskas	(Estonia) Tartu Ülikool	27	230	8.52
3	(Latvia) Kristaps Dārgais	(Latvia) Ogre	32	268	8.38
4	(Estonia) Mihkel Kirves	(Estonia) Pärnu Sadam	29	241	8.31
5	(Latvia) Guntis Sīpoliņš	(Estonia) Valga-Valka/Maks & Moorits / (Latvia) Liepāja	28	228	8.14

=== Assists ===
Rank	Name	Team	Games	Assists	APG
1	(United States) Tony Wroten	(Estonia) Kalev/Cramo	18	137	7.61
2	(United States) Aaron Johnson	(Latvia) Ventspils	30	202	6.73
3	(United States) Jabril Durham	(Latvia) VEF Rīga	28	180	6.43
4	(Latvia) Rinalds Sirsniņš	(Latvia) Ogre	32	204	6.38
5	(Estonia) Norman Käbin	(Estonia) TalTech	28	163	5.82

== Awards ==
=== Most Valuable Player ===
- (Latvia) Rihards Lomažs ( (Latvia) Ventspils)

=== Player of the Month ===
Month	Player	Team
October	(Lithuania) Julius Kazakauskas	(Estonia) Tartu Ülikool
November	(Latvia) Kaspars Bērziņš	(Latvia) Ogre
December	(Estonia) Toomas Raadik	(Estonia) TalTech
January	(United States) Dominique Hawkins	(Estonia) Avis Utilitas Rapla
February	(Estonia) Toomas Raadik	(Estonia) TalTech

== Estonian championship ==
=== Bracket ===
Quarterfinals
Avis Utilitas Rapla	1
Pärnu Sadam	3
Tartu Ülikool	1
Tallinna Kalev/TLÜ	3

Semifinals
Kalev/Cramo	3
Pärnu Sadam	0
TalTech	0
Tallinna Kalev/TLÜ	3

Finals
Kalev/Cramo	3
Tallinna Kalev/TLÜ	0
Third place
Pärnu Sadam	3
TalTech	0

=== Quarterfinals ===
Team 1	Series	Team 2	Game 1	Game 2	Game 3	Game 4	Game 5
Tartu Ülikool	1–3	Tallinna Kalev/TLÜ	78–73	70–87	77–83	96–97	
Avis Utilitas Rapla	1–3	Pärnu Sadam	60–83	57–82	82–80	76–88	

=== Semifinals ===
Team 1	Series	Team 2	Game 1	Game 2	Game 3	Game 4	Game 5
Kalev/Cramo	3–0	Pärnu Sadam	91–85	102–62	89–72		
TalTech	0–3	Tallinna Kalev/TLÜ	75–78	86–94	92–97		

=== Third place series ===
Team 1	Series	Team 2	Game 1	Game 2	Game 3	Game 4	Game 5
Pärnu Sadam	3–0	TalTech	75–68	79–73	89–63		

=== Finals ===
Team 1	Series	Team 2	Game 1	Game 2	Game 3	Game 4	Game 5
Kalev/Cramo	3–0	Tallinna Kalev/TLÜ	87–78	101–73	105–83		

== Latvian championship ==
The six best Latvian teams qualified for the national play-offs, that started on 10 April 2019.

Quarterfinals and semifinals are played in a best-of-five games format (1-1-1-1-1) while the final in a best of seven one.

=== Bracket ===
Quarterfinals
Jūrmala Betsafe	3
Latvijas Universitāte	0
Ogre	3
Valmiera Glass ViA	0

Semifinals
Ventspils	3
Jūrmala Betsafe	0
VEF Rīga	3
Ogre	0

Finals
Ventspils	1
VEF Rīga	4
Third place
Ogre	3
Jūrmala Betsafe	0

=== Quarterfinals ===
Team 1	Series	Team 2	Game 1	Game 2	Game 3	Game 4	Game 5
Ogre	3–0	Valmiera Glass ViA	100–81	93–82	73–67		
Jūrmala Betsafe	3–0	Latvijas Universitāte	72–56	60–55	90–59		

=== Semifinals ===
Team 1	Series	Team 2	Game 1	Game 2	Game 3	Game 4	Game 5
Ventspils	3–0	Jūrmala Betsafe	86–78	91–63	85–72		
VEF Rīga	3–0	Ogre	110–71	104–77	90–85		

=== Third place series ===
The team with the higher seed played game one, two, five and seven (if necessary) at home.

Team 1	Series	Team 2	Game 1	Game 2	Game 3	Game 4	Game 5
Ogre	3–0	Jūrmala Betsafe	78–60	97–90	83–78		

=== Finals ===
Team 1	Series	Team 2	Game 1	Game 2	Game 3	Game 4	Game 5	Game 6	Game 7
Ventspils	1–4	VEF Rīga	75–81	80–71	77–81	90–98	69–82		

== Estonian and Latvian clubs in European competitions ==
Team	Competition	Progress
(Latvia) Ventspils	Champions League	Regular season
(Latvia) Ventspils	FIBA Europe Cup	Round of 16
