= Artūrs Ausējs =

Latvian basketball player (born 1990)

No. 2 – BK Ventspils
- Position: Shooting guard
- League: LEBL

Personal information
- Born: 16 December 1990 (age 35) Olaine, Latvia
- Listed height: 1.92 m (6 ft 4 in)
- Listed weight: 90 kg (198 lb)

Career information
- Playing career: 2008–present

Career history
- 2008–2013: BK Jelgava
- 2013–2015: BK Jūrmala
- 2015–2016: BK Barons
- 2016–2017: BK Liepāja
- 2017–2018: Pieno žvaigždės
- 2018–2019: VEF Rīga
- 2019–2020: Ural Yekaterinburg
- 2020–present: BK Ventspils

Career highlights
- LBL champion (2019); BBL champion (2018)

Artūrs Ausējs (born 16 December 1990) is a Latvian professional basketball player who plays for Ventspils of the Latvian–Estonian Basketball League. He stands 1.92 meters tall and plays the shooting guard position.

== Career ==
=== BK Jelgava ===
Ausējs began his career playing at the LBL2 level, unlike other Latvian teenagers who trained at basketball schools abroad. At 16 years old, he joined the Jelgava BJSS basketball team of Jelgava Children and Youth Sports School.

Ausējs was recognized as LBL2 Player of the Month for November 2012, with averages of 21.6 points, 6.2 rebounds, 4.4 points, and two steals. That season, he was seen as one of the top players in the LBL2. However, he declined offers to be promoted to the pro team of Jelgava, as he felt he wasn't ready yet.

=== BK Jūrmala ===
Ausējs then began playing for BK Jūrmala. They were dominant during the Latvian Basketball League (LBL) 2014–15 regular season, winning 11 straight games. However, they only made it to the quarterfinals.

=== BK Barons ===
For the 2015–16 season, Ausējs was with the BK Barons.

=== BK Liepāja ===
Ausējs averaged 14.5 points in the LBL, and 16.1 points per game in the Baltic Basketball League (BBL) with BK Liepāja.

=== BC Pieno žvaigždes ===
Ausējs initially planned on returning for another season with Liepāja as their team captain. However, on August 27, 2017, he joined the Lithuanian team Pieno žvaigždes. This was his first time playing for a non-Latvian team. His team finished sixth overall in the regular season, but lost in the first round of the playoffs. In 40 games in the Lithuanian Basketball League, he averaged 10.4 points, 2.0 assists and 1.0 steals in 24.8 minutes. They did a much better job in the BBL, as he led them to a title over Jūrmala. In 18 games in the BBL, he averaged 11.8 points, 2.4 assists and 1.0 steals in 22.8 minutes. This would be the last championship given in the BBL, as the league shut down the following season.

=== VEF Rīga ===
After his one season in Lithuania, Ausējs returned to his home country to play for VEF Rīga in the Latvian–Estonian Basketball League (LEBL). He was able to win a LBL championship with VEF Rīga, averaging 11.2 points and shooting 39% from three point range.

=== Ural Yekaterinburg ===
On August 7, 2019, Ausējs joined Ural Yekaterinburg in the Russian Basketball Super League 1. He played in all 26 games for the team, helping them to eight wins and averaging 13.1 points, three assists, and three rebounds per game.

=== BK Ventspils ===
On August 18, 2020, Ausējs joined BK Ventspils. In his first season with the team, he averaged 15.2 points, 4.5 assists and 1.2 steals per game, and 14.1 points and 4.8 assists in the playoffs. He got them into the LBL finals with a game-winning three-pointer over BK Ogre in the semifinals. There, they finished as runner-ups. They made it to the finals once again during the 2022 LBL Play-offs. For his fourth season with team, he was appointed as team captain, taking over the role from Andrejs Šeļakovs. Off the bench, he averaged 14.2 points, 2.9 rebounds, and 3.5 assists. That year, they made it to the semis of the LEBL. During the 2024–25 LEBL season, he was awarded as Player of the Month for February 2025 as the team's leading scorer. He also led them to the finals of the Latvian Basketball Cup.

== National team career ==
Ausējs didn't play for the Latvian national youth team. In 2017, he got to play for the Latvian senior team. Although he did not make the roster for Eurobasket 2017 as the final cut on the Eurobasket team, he got to play in two 2019 FIBA World Cup qualifiers. In 2020, he got to play in the Baltic Way tournament, a tournament between Baltic nations. They finished third in that tournament. In 2022, he was included in the roster of Latvia's national 3x3 team.
