= Dāvids Vīksne =

Latvian basketball player

No. 37 – Kangoeroes Basket Mechelen
- Position: Small forward
- League: BNXT League

Personal information
- Born: 7 November 2000 (age 26) Sigulda, Latvia
- Listed height: 6 ft 5 in (1.96 m)
- Listed weight: 188 lb (85 kg)

Career information
- Playing career: 2016–present

Career history
- 2016–2018: Valmiera/Ordo
- 2018–2021: BK Ventspils
- 2021–2023: Latvijas Universitāte
- 2023–2025: Rīgas Zeļļi
- 2025–2026: Traiskirchen Lions
- 2026–present: Kangoeroes Basket Mechelen
Medals
Men's basketball
Representing Latvia
FIBA U18 European Championship
Silver medal – second place	2018 Latvia	National team

Dāvids Vīksne (born 7 November 2000) is a Latvian professional basketball player for Kangoeroes Basket Mechelen of the BNXT League. He plays at small forward position.

== Professional career ==
He began his professional career with the Valmiera/Ordo, but in 2018 he joined one of the most titled Latvian clubs, BK Ventspils. Later on, Vīksne was one of the leaders of Latvijas Universitāte, while studying at the Faculty of Business, Management and Economics of the University of Latvia. In the summer of 2023, Vīksne became a player of the new club Rīgas Zeļļi.

On July 4, 2026, he signed with Kangoeroes Basket Mechelen of the BNXT League.

== National team ==
Vīksne represented Latvia in youth competitions, including 2018 FIBA Europe Under-18 Championship when he won the silver medal. Year later he participated in 2019 FIBA Under-19 Basketball World Cup.

== Personal life ==
The beginning of Vīksne's career was affected by a serious accident - a natural gas cylinder explosion, which occurred in 2018.
