= Denis Krestinin =

Lithuanian basketball player (born 1994)

Personal information
- Born: 15 April 1994 (age 32) Vilnius, Lithuania
- Listed height: 6 ft 8 in (2.03 m)
- Listed weight: 216 lb (98 kg)

Career information
- Playing career: 2010–present
- Position: Forward
- Number: 55

Career history
- 2010–2011: Vilnius KK Akademija
- 2011–2012: Šarūnas Marčiulionis Basketball Academy
- 2012–2013: Sakalai
- 2013–2014: Turów Zgorzelec
- 2014–2015: Jelgava
- 2015–2016: Turów Zgorzelec
- 2016–2017: Barons
- 2017–2018: Jūrmala
- 2018–2019: Prishtina
- 2019-2020: BK Jūrmala
- 2020–2021: BC Šiauliai
- 2021–2022: BK Ventspils
- 2022-2023: OSE LIONS
- 2023–2024: Keila Coolbet
- 2024-2025: BC Prievidza
- 2025-2025: Traiskirchen Lions
- 2025-present: Rīgas Zeļļi

Career highlights
- Kosovo Superleague champion (2019); Polish League champion (2014)
Medals
Men's basketball
Representing Lithuania
FIBA World Under-19 Championship
Bronze medal – third place	2013 Czech Republic	U-19 Team
FIBA Europe Under-18 Championship
Silver medal – second place	2012 Latvia/Lithuania	U-18 Team
FIBA Europe Under-16 Championship
Silver medal – second place	2010 Montenegro	U-16 Team

Denis Krestinin (born 15 April 1994) is a Lithuanian basketball player.

== International career ==
Krestinin represented Lithuania in the U–16, U–18, U–19 and U–20 youth tournaments.
