= Kristers Zoriks =

Latvian basketball player

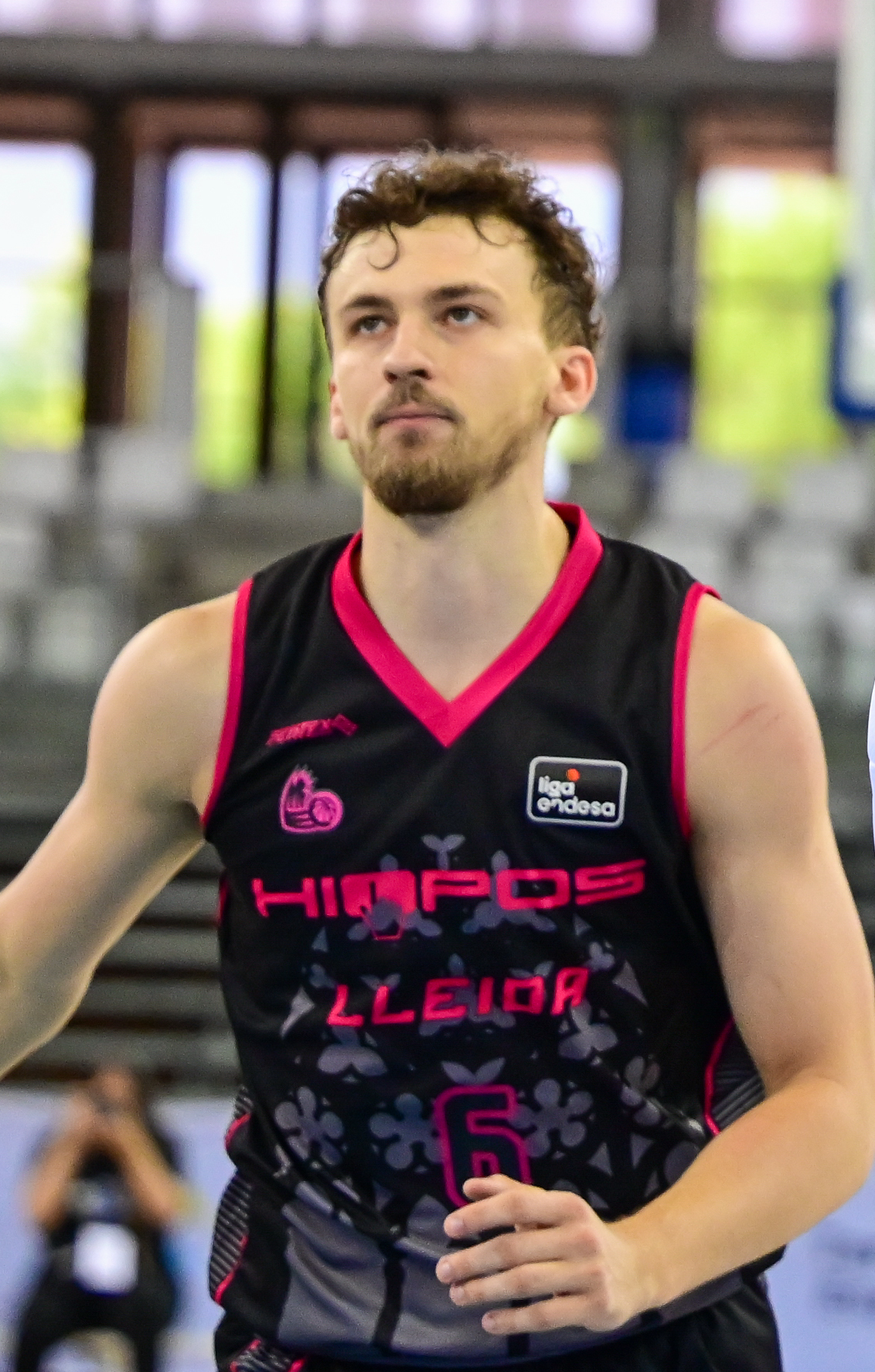
- Zoriks with Hiopos Lleida in 2025

No. 6 – Legia Warsaw
- Position: Point guard / shooting guard
- League: PLK

Personal information
- Born: 25 May 1998 (age 28) Dobele, Latvia
- Listed height: 6 ft 4 in (1.93 m)
- Listed weight: 185 lb (84 kg)

Career information
- High school: New Hampton School
- College: Saint Mary's (2017–2020)
- NBA draft: 2022: undrafted
- Playing career: 2020–present

Career history
- 2020–2023: VEF Rīga
- 2023–2024: Petkim Spor
- 2024–2025: ESSM Le Portel
- 2025–2026: Hiopos Lleida
- 2026: APU Udine
- 2026: Merkezefendi Denizli Basket
- 2026–present: Legia Warsaw

Career highlights
- 3× LBL champion (2021–2023); 2x Latvian Cup winner (2022, 2023); Latvian-Estonian Basketball League champion (2022); LBL play-offs MVP (2022)
Medals
Men's basketball
Representing Latvia
FIBA Europe Under-16 Championship
Silver medal – second place	2014 Latvia	National Team
Men's basketball
Representing Latvia
FIBA Europe Under-20 Division B
Silver medal – second place	2018 Bulgaria	National Team

Kristers Zoriks (born 25 May 1998) is a Latvian professional basketball player for Legia Warsaw of the Polish Basketball League (PLK), who plays the point guard and shooting guard position. He represents the Latvia national team.
