= Kristaps Dārgais =

Latvian basketball player (born 1990)

Personal information
- Born: 9 August 1990 (age 36) Jumprava, Ogre, Latvia
- Listed height: 6 ft 6 in (1.98 m)
- Listed weight: 223 lb (101 kg)

Career information
- Playing career: 2011–2026
- Position: Small forward / power forward
- Number: 21

Career history
- 2011–2013: Latvijas Universitāte
- 2013–2015: Valmiera Ordo
- 2015–2017: Barons Kvartāls
- 2017–2026: BK Ogre

Career highlights
- Latvian-Estonian Basketball League MVP (2022)

Kristaps Dārgais (born 9 August 1990 in Ogre, Latvia) is a Latvian former professional basketball player and a professional dunker. Standing at 1.98 m (6 ft 6 in), he played the forward position.

He began his professional career in 2011 and has spent most of it with BK Ogre in the Latvian Basketball League (LBL) and the Latvian–Estonian Basketball League, where he also served as team captain. Over the years, he has represented clubs such as BK Latvijas Universitāte, Valmiera/Ordo and Barons Kvartāls, before returning to BK Ogre in 2017.

During his career, Dārgais has been outstanding in slam dunking. He has participated multiple times in the Latvian Basketball League All-Star Game, where he became the winner of its slam dunk contest. Dārgais has also been a professional dunker, representing the Dunk Elite program. In 2013, he won the FIBA 3x3 Slam Dunk Contest, along with numerous smaller competitions in various countries.

In 2022, Dārgais was named regular season MVP of the 2021–22 Latvian–Estonian Basketball League.

He broke the Latvian–Estonian Basketball League single‑game rebounding record on 19 November 2025, collecting 24 rebounds in a 77–67 victory over KK Viimsi. His performance surpassed the previous league record of 21 rebounds, held jointly by Klāvs Dubults, Arnaldo Toro, and Artem Kovalev. Dārgais also improved his personal best in offensive rebounds (10) and matched his career‑high efficiency rating (41).

== Honours ==
- Latvian Basketball League silver: 2020
- Latvian Basketball League bronze: 2017, 2019, 2021, 2022
- Latvian-Estonian Basketball League bronze: 2021
