= PATA (company) =

Company based in Latvia

- Company type: Private
- Industry: timber
- Founded: 1999
- Headquarters: Inčukalns, Latvia
- Number of locations: stores in Valmiera and Riga
- Key people: Uldis Mierkalns
- Products: lumber uncut boards planed boards calibrated materials floor boards and terrace facing panels bath panels laminated panels fuel materials
- Services: timber wholesale timber transport forest management
- Revenue: 234,800,680 euro (2023)
- Net income: 1,638,597 euro (2023)
- Total assets: 118 386 502 EUR
- Number of employees: 152 (2013)
- Website: pata.lv

PATA (or SIA “PATA”) is a Latvian privately owned timber trading, management and logistics company. Uldis Mierkalns is the owner of the company with 100% of its shares.

== Services ==
The company provides forest management services, such as initial stages of forest planting, felling, timber transportation, sawmills, production of sawn timber, fire wood and fuel chips.

== Subsidiaries ==
PATA Timber – timber trading company, operating five stores, including concept stores in selling domestically produced timber across Latvia. Majority of the products available in the stores is provided by the parent company, which consists of Latvian produced timber, as well as foreign produced timber. The subsidiary works in cooperation with trading house Kursi. According to Atis Kalnins, sales network manager and the member of the board of the subsidiary, concept shops are also opened in Dreilini.

== Charity ==
Pata is a “shelter friend” of the Ulubele animal shelter. The company also collaborated with Latvian Ornithology Society and various Latvian athletes in a birds’ nest instalment project in 2013.
