= BK Ogre =

Latvian basketbal club

- Leagues: LBL; Latvian-Estonian League
- Founded: 2014; 12 years ago
- Arena: Sport arena Ogre
- Capacity: 1700
- Location: Ogre, Latvia
- Team colors: Blue and White
- Team manager: Rinalds Sirsniņš
- Head coach: Artūrs Visockis-Rubenis
- Website: bkogre.lv
Home	Away

BK Ogre is a professional basketball club based in Ogre, Latvia playing in the Latvian Basketball League and Latvian-Estonian Basketball League. The professional club was founded in 2014, but until then there was a local team that played second tier basketball. Ogre has a long history of bringing up professional players like Kaspars Bērziņš, Artūrs Bērziņš, Rinalds Sirsniņš among many others.

== History ==
City of Ogre has a long history of bringing up professional basketball players, including Kaspars Bērziņš, Artūrs Bērziņš and Rinalds Sirsniņš who have all once played for Latvia national basketball team. In 2009 local sports school's team started to play in Latvian 2nd division. After going to semi-finals in debut season management was assured of going to right direction with participation in 2nd division.

As Latvian Basketball League was looking for new teams to join the league, Ogre first started to think of going fully professional in 2014. City of Ogre established a professional club with a goal to win the 2nd division. After winning 2nd division in 2015, management decided it's time to move to the next level and joined the Latvian Basketball League.

During the first season club got new title sponsor and changed its name to Ogre/Kumho Tyre. After finishing the debut season next to last team let go head coach Edgars Teteris and hired Latvian U16 head coach Artūrs Visockis-Rubenis, who previously worked for University of Latvia. In 2016/2017 Ogre/Kumho Tyre made a debut in Baltic Basketball League. Also, during the season the most famous Ogre's player Kaspars Bērziņš joined the team for couple months to get back in shape after an injury and wait for bigger offers.

In 2023 the new Arēna Ogre was opened and BK Ogre moved there to play its home games in a brand new arena.

== Players ==
=== Current roster ===
BK Ogre roster
Players
Coaches

Pos.	No.	Nat.	Name	Ht.	Wt.	Age
PG	1	(Latvia)	Juris Vītols	1.89 m (6 ft 2 in)	86 kg (190 lb)	21 – 29 July 2005
SF	8	(Latvia)	Martins Kudrjavcevs	1.97 m (6 ft 6 in)	85 kg (187 lb)	17 – 22 February 2009
SF	9	(Latvia)	Kārlis Apsītis	2.00 m (6 ft 7 in)	90 kg (198 lb)	34 – 2 July 1992
SG	10	(Latvia)	Bruno Jēkabsons	1.88 m (6 ft 2 in)	80 kg (176 lb)	18 – 6 May 2008
PG	11	(United States)	Drake Dobbs	1.88 m (6 ft 2 in)	80 kg (176 lb)	25 – 31 March 2001
SG	12	(Latvia)	Kārlis Šilke-Žunda	1.95 m (6 ft 5 in)	87 kg (192 lb)	29 – 25 July 1997
SG	15	(Latvia)	Luka Hlebovickis	1.92 m (6 ft 4 in)	75 kg (165 lb)	17 – 14 October 2009
PF	20	(United States)	Owen Lobsinger	2.06 m (6 ft 9 in)	101 kg (223 lb)	24 – 30 August 2002
SF	22	(Latvia)	Jēkabs Kapustāns	1.96 m (6 ft 5 in)	92 kg (203 lb)	20 – 13 December 2005
SF	25	(Latvia)	Aleks Simsons	2.03 m (6 ft 8 in)	88 kg (194 lb)	20 – 10 November 2006
PF	31	(Ukraine)	Volodymyr Poluiakhtov	2.03 m (6 ft 8 in)	95 kg (209 lb)	22 – 9 June 2004
C	33	(Latvia)	Guntis Sīpoliņš	2.06 m (6 ft 9 in)	96 kg (212 lb)	33 – 10 November 1993

Head coach

- (Latvia) Artūrs Visockis-Rubenis

Assistant coach(es)

- (Latvia) Uldis Švēde
- (Latvia) Dāvis Feikners

Physiotherapist(s)

- (Latvia) Kristīne Plūme
- (Latvia) Nikola Sergejeva

Legend

- (C) Team captain
- Injured

- Roster
Updated: August 31, 2026

=== Depth chart ===
Pos.	Starting 5	Bench 1	Bench 2
C	Guntis Sīpoliņš
PF	Owen Lobsinger	Aleks Simsons	Volodymyr Poluiakhtov
SF	Martins Kudrjavcevs	Kārlis Apsītis	Jēkabs Kapustāns
SG	Kārlis Šilke-Žunda	Bruno Jēkabsons	Luka Hlebovickis
PG	Juris Vītols	Drake Dobbs

=== Squad changes for the 2026–27 season ===
==== In ====
Note: Flags indicate national team, as has been defined under FIBA eligibility rules. Players may hold more than one non-FIBA nationality.

No.	Pos.	Nat.	Player
	SG	(Latvia) LAT	Kārlis Šilke-Žunda (from (Italy) (3) Ristopro Fabriano)
	PG	(United States) USA	Drake Dobbs (from (Netherlands) Landstede Hammers)
	SF	(Latvia) LAT	Jēkabs Kapustāns (from (Latvia) (2) BK Līvāni/BJSS)
	PG	(Latvia) LAT	Juris Vītols (from (Latvia) Rīgas Zeļļi)
	PF	(United States) USA	Owen Lobsinger (from (Australia) (2) Nunawading Spectres)
	SG	(Latvia) LAT	Bruno Jēkabsons (from (Spain) Baxi Manresa U22 team)

==== Out ====
Note: Flags indicate national team, as has been defined under FIBA eligibility rules. Players may hold more than one non-FIBA nationality.

No.	Pos.	Nat.	Player
21	F	(Latvia) LAT	Kristaps Dārgais (career end)
9	SG	(Latvia) LAT	Gustavs Kampuss (to (Latvia) Rīgas Zeļļi)
5	C	(Latvia) LAT	Reinis Avotiņš (to (Latvia) BK Liepāja)
1	PG	(United States) USA	Keishawn Davidson (to (Lithuania) (2) BC Telšiai)
0	SG	(Latvia) LAT	Markuss Lastiņš (to (Latvia) LU)
10	PF	(Canada) CAN	Justin Ndjock-Tadjore (free agent)
7	PG	(Ukraine) UKR	Anatoly Shundel (free agent)
80	PG	(United States) USA	Anders Nelson (free agent)
14	C	(Latvia) LAT	Kaspars Bērziņš (free agent)

== Season by season ==
Season	Tier	League	Pos.	W–L	Baltic League	Latvian-Estonian League
2009–10	2	LBL2	4th	18-16		
2010–11	2	LBL2	5th	16-8		
2011–12	2	LBL2	13th	8-22		
2012–13	2	LBL2	7th	16-15		
2013–14	2	LBL2	4th	24-11		
2014–15	2	LBL2	1st	25–8		
2015–16	1	LBL	10th	9–27		
2016–17	1	LBL	8th	13–19	Round of 16	
2017–18	1	LBL	4th	24–15	Quarterfinals	
2018–19	1	LBL	3rd	6–3		Reg.season 4th (18-10), Playoff 4th
2019–20	1	LBL	2nd	—		cancelled due to COVID-19
2020–21	1	LBL	3rd	14–11		Bronze (2-1 at Final 6)
2021–22	1	LBL	3rd	8–3		Reg.season 5th (16-10), Playoff 4th
2022–23	1	LBL	4th	5–6		Reg.season 7th (17-13), Playoff 7th
2023–24	1	LBL	5th	2–3		Reg.season 7th (17-13), Playoff 7th
2024–25	1	LBL	5th	17–11		Reg.season 4th (17-11), Playoff 4th

== Honours ==
=== League ===
- Latvian League:

Winners (0):

Runners-up (1): 2020

Bronze (3): 2019, 2021, 2022

- Latvian League 2nd Division:

Winners (1): 2015

- Latvian–Estonian League

Winners (0):

Runners-up (0):

Bronze (1): 2021

== Coaches ==
- (Latvia) Artūrs Visockis-Rubenis: 2026-
- (Latvia) Uldis Švēde: 2021-2026
- (Latvia) Nikolajs Mazurs: 2019-2021
- (Latvia) Artūrs Visockis-Rubenis: 2016-2019
- (Latvia) Edgars Teteris: 2015-2016
- (Latvia) Pēteris Ozoliņš: 2014-2015
