= Rayshaun Hammonds =

American basketball player

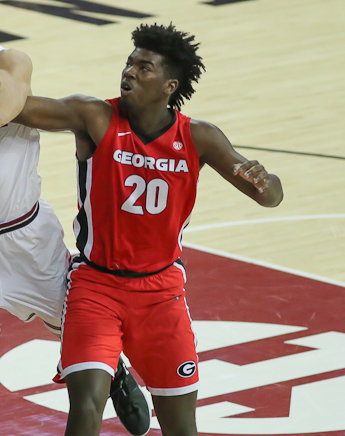

No. 22 – Wonju DB Promy
- Position: Power forward / center
- League: KBL

Personal information
- Born: November 10, 1998 (age 28) Augusta, Georgia, U.S.
- Listed height: 6 ft 9 in (2.06 m)
- Listed weight: 235 lb (107 kg)

Career information
- High school: Norcross (Norcross, Georgia)
- College: Georgia (2017–2020)
- NBA draft: 2020: undrafted
- Playing career: 2021–present

Career history
- 2021: Fort Wayne Mad Ants
- 2021–2022: VEF Rīga
- 2022–2023: BG Göttingen
- 2023–2024: Avtodor
- 2024: Santeros de Aguada
- 2024–2025: Suwon KT Sonicboom
- 2025–2026: Ulsan Hyundai Mobis Phoebus
- 2026–present: Wonju DB Promy

Career highlights
- Latvian-Estonian Basketball League Champion (2022); Latvian Cup (2022); LBL champion (2022)
- Stats at NBA.com
- Stats at Basketball Reference

Rayshaun Hammonds (born November 10, 1998) is an American professional basketball player for Wonju DB Promy of the Korean Basketball League (KBL). He played college basketball for the Georgia Bulldogs.

== High school career ==
Hammonds attended Norcross High School. In the summer of 2016, he averaged 18 points, eight rebounds, and nearly two steals and two assists per game in the Nike EYBL. As a senior, Hammonds averaged 18 points and 11 rebounds per game and led the team to the Class 7A final. He was named Gwinnett County player of the year by the Atlanta Journal-Constitution. He was considered a four-star prospect, ranked the 38th best player in his class by ESPN. On his 18th birthday, November 10, 2016, Hammonds committed to Georgia over offers from Texas, Miami (Florida) and Memphis.

== College career ==
In his debut versus Bryant, Hammonds became the first Georgia freshman to start his first game since Kentavious Caldwell-Pope in 2011 and finished with 17 points. As a freshman at Georgia, Hammonds averaged 6.7 points and 4.9 rebounds per game. On November 19, 2018, Hammonds scored a career-high 31 points in an 80–68 win against Illinois State in the Cayman Islands Classic. He averaged 12.1 points and 6.1 rebounds per game as a sophomore. Hammonds suffered a foot injury against Ole Miss on February 23, 2019, and was ruled out for the season on March 7. As a junior, he served as a complementary place to Anthony Edwards, posting five double-doubles and scored a season-high 26 points twice. Hammonds averaged 12.9 points and 7.4 rebounds per game, shooting 35 percent from three-point range. Following the season, he declared for the 2020 NBA draft but did not initially hire an agent. On May 3, 2020, Hammonds decided to remain in the draft, forfeiting his remaining year of collegiate eligibility.

== Professional career ==
After going undrafted in the 2020 NBA draft, Hammonds signed with the Indiana Pacers. On December 18, he was waived by the Pacers.

On January 11, 2021, Hammonds was signed by the Fort Wayne Mad Ants of the NBA G League. He averaged 6.1 points and 4.8 rebounds per game. On August 26, 2021, Hammonds signed with VEF Rīga of the LEBL.

On July 25, 2022, Hammonds signed with the BG Göttingen of the Basketball Bundesliga.

On July 9, 2023, Hammonds signed with the Avtodor of the VTB United League.

On June 14, 2024, Hammonds signed with the Suwon KT Sonicboom of the Korean Basketball League (KBL) for 2024–25 season. On July 12, he signed with the Santeros de Aguada of Baloncesto Superior Nacional (BSN) for 2024 season.

On June 25, 2025, Rayshaun Hammonds signed with Ulsan Hyundai Mobis Phoebus. He joined the team as a transfer from another Korean Basketball League (KBL) club, Suwon KT Sonicboom.

On June 22, 2026, Hammonds signed with Wonju DB Promy. He joined the team as a transfer from another Korean Basketball League (KBL) club, Ulsan Hyundai Mobis Phoebus.

== Career statistics ==
Legend
GP	Games played	GS	Games started	MPG	Minutes per game
FG%	Field goal percentage	3P%	3-point field goal percentage	FT%	Free throw percentage
RPG	Rebounds per game	APG	Assists per game	SPG	Steals per game
BPG	Blocks per game	PPG	Points per game	**Bold**	Career high

=== College ===
Year	Team	GP	GS	MPG	FG%	3P%	FT%	RPG	APG	SPG	BPG	PPG
2017–18	Georgia	**33**	26	24.2	.421	.286	.695	4.9	1.4	.5	.2	6.7
2018–19	Georgia	28	27	24.3	**.492**	**.366**	**.806**	6.1	**1.6**	**.9**	**.4**	12.1
2019–20	Georgia	32	**32**	**28.0**	.464	.350	.652	**7.4**	1.5	.8	**.4**	**12.9**
Career		93	85	25.5	.462	.339	.722	6.1	1.5	.7	.3	10.5
