= Artis Ate =

Latvian basketball player (born 1989)

No. 9 – Valmiera Glass ViA
- Position: Shooting guard / small forward
- League: LEBL

Personal information
- Born: 29 July 1989 (age 37) Rucava, Latvian SSR, Soviet Union
- Listed height: 1.93 m (6 ft 4 in)
- Listed weight: 88 kg (194 lb)

Career information
- Playing career: 2009–present

Career history
- 2009–2014: BK Liepāja
- 2014–2017: BK Ventspils
- 2017–2019: VEF Rīga
- 2019–2020: U-BT Cluj-Napoca
- 2020–2023: VEF Rīga
- 2023–2024: Pieno žvaigždės Pasvalys
- 2024–present: Valmiera Glass Via

Career highlights
- 3× LBL champion (2019, 2021, 2022); Romanian Cup winner (2020); 2x Latvian Cup winner (2022, 2026); Latvian-Estonian Basketball League champion (2022)

Artis Ate (born 29 July 1989) is a Latvian professional basketball player for Valmiera Glass Via of the Latvian–Estonian Basketball League (LEBL). He plays the shooting guard and small forward positions.
