= Jalen Riley =

American basketball player (born 1993)

Free agent
- Position: Point guard

Personal information
- Born: March 6, 1993 (age 33) Racine, Wisconsin, U.S.
- Listed height: 6 ft 1 in (1.85 m)
- Listed weight: 173 lb (78 kg)

Career information
- High school: Jerome I. Case (Mount Pleasant, Wisconsin)
- College: College of Lake County (2011–2012); Sauk Valley (2012–2013); East Tennessee State (2013–2015)
- NBA draft: 2015: undrafted
- Playing career: 2016–present

Career history
- 2016: Levickí Patrioti
- 2016: Akureyri
- 2017–2018: CB Cazorla
- 2018–2019: Palangos Kuršiai
- 2019–2020: Cholet
- 2020–2021: FC Porto
- 2021–2022: VEF Rīga
- 2022–2023: PAOK Thessaloniki
- 2023–2024: Jiangsu Dragons
- 2025: Peristeri
- 2025: Stal Ostrów Wielkopolski
- 2025–2026: FC Porto
- 2026: Elitzur Netanya

Career highlights
- LBL champion (2022); Latvian-Estonian League champion (2022); Latvian-Estonian League Final Four MVP (2022); Latvian-Estonian League Final Four First Team (2022); Latvian Cup winner (2022); Hugo dos Santos Cup winner (2021)

Jalen Ross Riley (born March 6, 1993) is an American professional basketball player, who most recently played for Elitzur Netanya of the Israeli Basketball Premier League. He has also played professionally in Iceland, Lithuania, France, Portugal, Latvia, Greece, China, and Poland.

== High school career ==
Riley attended Jerome I. Case High School in Mount Pleasant, Wisconsin. As a senior, he averaged 13.3 points per game and was named to the second-team All-Racine County.

== College career ==
Riley walked on to the basketball team at the College of Lake County and averaged 15.9 points per game as a freshman. He earned a scholarship to Sauk Valley Community College as a sophomore, averaging 19.3 points and 3.4 rebounds per game. Riley transferred to East Tennessee State and was named Atlantic Sun Conference Newcomer of the Year as a junior. As a senior, he averaged 20.2 points per game and was named to the First Team All-Atlantic Sun.

== Professional career ==
Riley was cut by the Iowa Energy in training camp and had several brief stints with European clubs. In 2016, he signed with Akureyri in Iceland and averaged 18.2 points per game. In the 2018-19 season, he played for Palangos Kuršiai and averaged 26.3 points per game. He had a 50-point game on January 1, 2019. He played for Cholet Basket during the 2019-20 season and averaged 11.2 points per game before the season was suspended due to the COVID-19 pandemic. Riley signed with FC Porto of the Portuguese league on December 26, 2020. He averaged 16 points and 2.7 assist per game.

On July 20, 2021, Riley signed with VEF Riga.

On July 28, 2022, Riley moved to Greek club PAOK Thessaloniki. In 26 league games, he averaged 10.6 points, 2.1 rebounds, 3.7 assists, 1.1 steals and 3.4 turnovers, playing around 24 minutes per contest.

On March 6, 2025, he signed with Stal Ostrów Wielkopolski of the Polish Basketball League (PLK).

On August 14, 2025, he signed with FC Porto of the Liga Portuguesa de Basquetebol (LPB).
