= Andrejs Šeļakovs =

Latvian basketball player

Personal information
- Born: November 8, 1988 (age 38) Dobele, Latvia
- Listed height: 2.08 m (6 ft 10 in)
- Listed weight: 113 kg (249 lb)

Career information
- NBA draft: 2010: undrafted
- Playing career: 2006–2025
- Position: Center
- Number: 12, 15, 21, 31, 33

Career history
- 2006–2007: ASK Rīga
- 2007–2011: VEF Rīga
- 2011–2012: CB Tarragona
- 2012: Barons Kvartāls
- 2012–2013: Club Melilla Baloncesto
- 2013–2014: Odesa
- 2014: Prishtina
- 2014–2015: Jēkabpils
- 2015–2016: Ventspils
- 2016–2017: Jēkabpils
- 2017: Dzūkija
- 2017: Liepāja
- 2017–2018: Legia Warszawa
- 2018: Jūrmala
- 2018–2019: Odesa
- 2019–2020: Liepāja
- 2020–2023: Ventspils
- 2023–2025: Jelgava

Andrejs Šeļakovs (born November 8, 1988) is a Latvian former basketball player, who played the center position. He spent the majority of his professional playing career in the Latvian Basketball League (LBL), with brief stints in Spain, Kosovo, and Poland.

== Pro career ==
Andrejs Šeļakovs started his pro career in 2006-2007 with ASK Rīga. Around that time he also was recruited by some major schools from NCAA Division 1, but he opted to stay in Europe. After one season with ASK he moved to VEF Rīga, where he spent four years. For the 2011–12 season he left Latvia for Spain, joining CB Tarragona of LEB Oro, Spanish second league. In beginning of 2012–13 season he played for Barons Kvartāls, but after few games he moved back to Spain, signing with Club Melilla Baloncesto on Christmas 2013.

On 25 September 2013, Šeļakovs signed with Ukrainian side BC Odesa.

In March 2014, Andrejs Šeļakovs signed with Sigal Prishtina.

The 2017–2018 season was a rollercoaster for Šeļakovs. First he signed with Lithuanian team BC Dzūkija, then was released and signed with Betsafe/Liepāja. In January 2018 Šeļakovs signed one-year deal with Legia Warszawa, newcomer of the Polska Liga Koszykówki. In February he left the team and signed with Latvian team BK Jūrmala.

== Latvian national team ==
He has represented Latvia national team in EuroBasket 2011 and Eurobasket 2013.
