= Guntis Endzels =

Latvian professional basketball coach (born 1967)

Latvijas Universitāte men's basketball
- Position: Head coach
- League: LEBL

Personal information
- Born: 5 December 1967 (age 58) Preiļi, Latvian SSR, USSR

Career history

Coaching
- 1998–2001: ASK/Brocēni/LMT (assistant)
- 2001–2003: BK Skonto (assistant)
- 2003–2004: BK Skonto
- 2006–2009: BK Ķeizarmežs
- 2009–2010: BK Ventspils (assistant)
- 2010–2012: OKarte Basketball Academy
- 2012: BK Liepājas Lauvas
- 2012–2014: BC Dnipro-Azot (assistant)
- 2014–2015: BK Saldus
- 2015–2016: BK Barons (assistant)
- 2016–: Latvijas Universitāte
Medals
Men's basketball
Representing Latvia
Basketball at the 2017 Summer Universiade
Silver medal – second place	2017 Taipei	National Team

Guntis Endzels (born 5 December 1967) is a Latvian professional basketball coach, who is currently a head coach for Latvijas Universitāte.

Endzels has been head coach for Latvian youth national teams in FIBA continental championships. From 2006 to 2007 he was also an assistant for Latvia men's national basketball team head coach Kārlis Muižnieks. In 2018 he was an assistant for Latvia women's national basketball team head coach Mārtiņš Zībarts at the 2018 FIBA Women's Basketball World Cup.
