= Rinalds Sirsniņš =

Latvian basketball player

No. 12 – BK Ogre
- Position: Point guard
- League: Latvian Basketball League, Baltic Basketball League

Personal information
- Born: July 4, 1985 (age 41) Ogre, Latvia
- Listed height: 6 ft 1 in (1.85 m)
- Listed weight: 198 lb (90 kg)

Career information
- Playing career: 2003–2025

Career history
- 2003–2004: BK Skonto
- 2004–2005: Anwil Wloclawek
- 2005–2006: BK Riga
- 2006–2007: Bumerangs/ASK Gulbene
- 2007–2008: Barons LMT
- 2008–2009: BK Valmiera
- 2009–2010: SKS Starogard Gdański
- 2011–2012: BC Rakvere Tarvas
- 2012–2013: MBC Mykolaiv
- 2013–2017: BK Jēkabpils
- 2017–2025: BK Ogre

Career highlights
- Latvian Champion (2008); FIBA EuroCup (2008)

Rinalds Sirsniņš (born 4 July 1985 in Ogre, Latvia) is a former Latvian professional basketball player. He is currently playing for BK Ogre at the guard position and general manager of the team.

== Honours ==
- Latvijas Basketbola līga: 2008
  - Runner-up: 2003, 2004
- FIBA EuroCup: 2008
- Polish Basketball League:
  - Runner-up: 2005
