= BK Ventspils =

Latvian basketbal club

- Leagues: Latvian–Estonian Basketball League; Latvian Basketball League
- Founded: 1994
- History: BK Ventspils; 1994–present
- Arena: Ventspils Olympic Center
- Capacity: 3,085
- Location: Ventspils, Latvia
- Team colors: Yellow and Blue
- President: Ģirts Štekerhofs
- Head coach: Gints Fogels
- Championships: 10 Latvian Championships; 1 BBL Championships; 1 Latvian-Estonian Basketball League
- Website: bkventspils.lv
Home	Away

BK Ventspils is a professional basketball club based in Ventspils, Latvia. The club competes in the Latvian-Estonian Basketball League.

== History ==
BK Ventspils was founded in 1994. In first years Ventspils proved themselves as relevant part of Latvian basketball, but major step came in 1997 when Ventspils Olympic Center was built. At that time Ventspils started to play in international competitions playing in 1997–98 edition of FIBA Korać Cup, which was followed by playing in FIBA Saporta Cup. Meanwhile, in the Latvian League Ventspils reached finals in both 1998 and 1999, but in 2000 they won their first domestic title and then went on to win seven consecutive from 2000 to 2006. The team won its eight Latvian League championship in 2009.

During that championship run Ventspils also had great performances in European competitions. In the 2002–03 season Ventspils reached FIBA Champions Cup Final Four, where they finished third. In the 2003–04 season Ventspils debuted in the ULEB Cup competition, making eighthfinals. In the 2004–05 ULEB Cup season, Ventspils reached new heights and missed semifinals after, losing by one point in two game series against Hemofarm. Before the 2009–10 season, Ventspils participated in the EuroLeague Qualifying round, becoming the first Latvian team to do so.

Ventspils has been a team for many players to establish themselves on the European stage, such as Mire Chatman, Marijonas Petravičius, Jānis Blūms, Brent Wright, and others, who later had successful careers at the EuroLeague level.

In 2013, BK Ventspils became the first Latvian club to have won the Baltic Basketball League, after winning the first leg by a score of 69:91, and losing the second, by a score of just 70:73, in the finals against Prienai, from Lithuania. In the following season, BK Ventspils won their first Latvian League title since 2009, becoming the champions of the 2014 Latvian Basketball League campaign.

== Honours ==
=== League ===
- Latvian-Estonian League

Winners (1): 2019

- Latvian League:

Winners (10): 2000, 2001, 2002, 2003, 2004, 2005, 2006, 2009, 2014, 2018

Runners-up (14): 1998, 1999, 2007, 2011, 2012, 2013, 2015, 2017, 2019, 2021, 2022, 2023, 2025, 2026

Bronze (6): 1996, 2008, 2010, 2016, 2020, 2024

- Latvian Cup

Runners-up (3): 2022, 2025, 2026

- Baltic League

Winners (1): 2013

Runners-up (1): 2015

Bronze (2): 2007, 2010

- North European Basketball League

Bronze (1): 2002

- FIBA Europe Champions Cup

Bronze (1): 2003

== Season by season ==
Season	League	Pos.	Baltic League	Pos.	European competitions	
1993–94	LBL	7th				
1994–95	LBL	6th				
1995–96	LBL	3rd				
1996–97	LBL	4th				
1997–98	LBL	2nd			3 Korać Cup	R16
1998–99	LBL	2nd			2 Saporta Cup	R16
1999–00	LBL	1st			2 Saporta Cup	R32
2000–01	LBL	1st			4 North European Basketball League	QF
2001–02	LBL	1st			4 North European Basketball League	3rd
2002–03	LBL	1st			3 FIBA Champions' Cup	3rd
2003–04	LBL	1st			2 ULEB Cup	T16
2004–05	LBL	1st	Elite Division	4th	2 ULEB Cup	QF
2005–06	LBL	1st	Elite Division	5th	2 ULEB Cup	T16
2006–07	LBL	2nd	Elite Division	3rd	2 ULEB Cup	T16
2007–08	LBL	3rd	Elite Division	6th	2 ULEB Cup	T32
2008–09	LBL	1st	Elite Division	7th	3 EuroChallenge	RS
2009–10	LBL	3rd	Elite Division	4th	1 Euroleague	QR1
2009–10	LBL	3rd	Elite Division	4th	2 Eurocup	RS
2010–11	LBL	2nd	Elite Division	4th	3 EuroChallenge	QF
2011–12	LBL	2nd	Elite Division	6th	2 Eurocup	QR
2011–12	LBL	2nd	Elite Division	6th	3 EuroChallenge	QF
2012–13	LBL	2nd	Champion		3 EuroChallenge	L16
2013–14	LBL	1st	Quarterfinalist		3 EuroChallenge	L16
2014–15	LBL	2nd	Runner-up		2 Eurocup	RS
2015–16	LBL	3rd			3 FIBA Europe Cup	R16
2016–17	LBL	2nd			3 Champions League	POQ
2017–18	LBL	1st			3 Champions League	RS
2017–18	LBL	1st			4 FIBA Europe Cup	R16
2018–19	LBL	2nd	Lat-Est BL	1st	3 Champions League	RS
2018–19	LBL	2nd	Lat-Est BL	1st	4 FIBA Europe Cup	R16
2019–20	LBL	3rd	Lat-Est BL		3 Champions League	QR2
2019–20	LBL	3rd	Lat-Est BL		4 FIBA Europe Cup	RS
2020–21	LBL	2nd	Lat-Est BL	6th		

Season	League	Regional	Europe	Latvian Cup	Head coach
2024-25	Latvian League; Runner-up	Latvian–Estonian League; Quarterfinals	do not participate	Latvian Cup; Runner-up	Gints Fogels
2025-26	Latvian League; Runner-up	Latvian–Estonian League; Quarterfinals	do not participate	Latvian Cup; Runner-up	Gints Fogels

== Roster ==
Note: Flags indicate national team eligibility at FIBA-sanctioned events. Players may hold other non-FIBA nationalities not displayed.

BK Ventspils 2026-27 roster
Players
Coaches

Pos.	No.	Nat.	Name	Ht.	Wt.	Age
SG	2	(Latvia)	Artūrs Ausējs (C)	1.92 m (6 ft 4 in)	90 kg (198 lb)	35 – 16 December 1990
PG	5	(Latvia)	Kristofers Karlsons	1.92 m (6 ft 4 in)	90 kg (198 lb)	22 – 21 March 2004
SG	7	(Estonia)	Kristen Kasemets	1.91 m (6 ft 3 in)	89 kg (196 lb)	24 – 8 May 2002
SF	11	(United States)	Isaiah Burnett	1.96 m (6 ft 5 in)	95 kg (209 lb)	27 – 19 April 1999
PF	13	(United States)	Romelle Mansel	2.04 m (6 ft 8 in)	98 kg (216 lb)	25 – 21 November 2000
F	23	(United States)	Ronnie DeGray III	2.00 m (6 ft 7 in)	95 kg (209 lb)	25 – 20 December 2000
PF	31	(Latvia)	Edvards Mežulis	2.02 m (6 ft 8 in)	115 kg (254 lb)	26 – 14 January 2000
C	30	(Latvia)	Ronalds Zaķis	2.06 m (6 ft 9 in)	105 kg (231 lb)	39 – 8 July 1987
G	44	(Latvia)	Jānis Censonis	1.85 m (6 ft 1 in)	80 kg (176 lb)	21 – 8 February 2005
SF	45	(Latvia)	Toms Salnājs	2.01 m (6 ft 7 in)	92 kg (203 lb)	21 – 25 February 2005
SG	51	(Latvia)	Jēkabs Graudiņš	1.86 m (6 ft 1 in)	75 kg (165 lb)	17 – 15 May 2009
SF	52	(Latvia)	Klāvs Černuho	1.88 m (6 ft 2 in)	78 kg (172 lb)	17 – 23 September 2009
C	96	(Ukraine)	Bogdan Bryniuk	2.06 m (6 ft 9 in)	108 kg (238 lb)	23 – 23 August 2003

Head coach

- (Latvia) Gints Fogels

Assistant coach(es)

- (Latvia) Reinis Gubāts
- (Latvia) Roberts Prūsis

Strength & conditioning coach(es)

- (Latvia) Edgars Seredjuks

Legend

- (C) Team captain
- Injured

- Roster
Updated: September 28, 2026

=== Depth chart ===
Pos.	Starting 5	Bench 1	Bench 2
C	Ronalds Zaķis	Bogdan Bryniuk
PF	Romelle Mansel	Edvards Mežulis	Toms Salnājs
SF	Isaiah Burnett	Ronnie DeGray III	Klāvs Černuho
SG	Kristen Kasemets	Artūrs Ausējs	Jēkabs Graudiņš
PG	Kristofers Karlsons	Jānis Censonis

=== Squad changes for the 2026–27 season ===
==== In ====
Note: Flags indicate national team, as has been defined under FIBA eligibility rules. Players may hold more than one non-FIBA nationality.

No.	Pos.	Nat.	Player
	SF	(Latvia) LAT	Toms Salnājs (from (United States) Eastern Arizona College)
	SG	(Estonia) EST	Kristen Kasemets (from (Estonia) Kalev/Cramo)
	SG	(Latvia) LAT	Kristofers Karlsons (from (Latvia) Valmiera Glass Via)
	SG	(United States) USA	Isaiah Burnett (from (Denmark) BK Amager)
	C	(Ukraine) UKR	Bogdan Bryniuk (from (Norway) Fyllingen BBK)
	C	(United States) USA	Romelle Mansel (from (Cyprus) Achilleas Kaimakli)
	SF	(United States) USA	Ronnie DeGray III (from (Lithuania) (2) BC Alytus)

==== Out ====
Note: Flags indicate national team, as has been defined under FIBA eligibility rules. Players may hold more than one non-FIBA nationality.

No.	Pos.	Nat.	Player
0	SG	(United States) USA	Aaron Johnson-Cash (to (Finland) Kouvot)
3	PG	(United States) USA	Cameron Shelton (to (Slovenia) KK Ilirija)
24	C	(United States) USA	Bryant Thomas (to (Hungary) Soproni KC)
32	SF	(Lithuania) LTU	Amandas Urkis (to (Iceland) Stjarnan)
7	PG	(Latvia) LAT	Renārs Birkāns (free agent)
23	PG	(Latvia) LAT	Rihards Teirumnieks (free agent)
10	SF	(Latvia) LAT	Roberts Bērze (free agent)
12	PF	(Latvia) LAT	Nikolajs Atanasovs (free agent)

* Left/joined the team during the season

=== Historical rosters ===
2025-26 season roster
Pos.	Starting 5	Bench 1	Bench 2
C	(United States) #24 Bryant Thomas	(Latvia) #30 Ronalds Zaķis	
PF	(Latvia) #31 Edvards Mežulis	(Latvia) #52 Nikolajs Atanasovs	
SF	(Lithuania) #32 Amandas Urkis	(Latvia) #10 Roberts Bērze	(Latvia) #12 Kārlis Šķiliņš
SG	(Latvia) #2 Artūrs Ausējs (C)	(United States) #0 Aaron Jonhson-Cash	(Latvia) #44 Jānis Censonis
PG	(United States) #3 Cameron Shelton	(Latvia) #7 Renārs Birkāns	(Latvia) #23 Rihards Teirumnieks

2024-25 season roster
Pos.	Starting 5	Bench 1	Bench 2	Reserves
C	(Latvia) #30 Rolands Zaķis	(Latvia) #31 Edvards Mežulis		
PF	(United States) #11 Zachary Watson	(Latvia) #13 Rūdis Donis		
SF	(Lithuania) #8 Tomas Lekūnas	(Latvia) #10 Roberts Bērze	(Romania) #35 Mihail Miseailo	(Latvia) #51 Kārlis Šķiliņš
SG	(United States) #5 Michael Randolph Jr.	(Latvia) #2 Artūrs Ausējs (C)	(Latvia) #15 Valters Vēveris	(Latvia) #69 Roberts Prūsis
PG	(Finland) #3 Perttu Blomgren	(Latvia) #44 Jānis Censonis	(Latvia) #7 Renārs Birkāns	

== Notable players ==
- Rihards Lomažs
- Artis Ate
- Ainars Bagatskis
- Dairis Bertāns
- Artūrs Bērziņš
- Jānis Blūms
- Sandis Buškevics
- Kaspars Cipruss
- Raitis Grafs
- Māris Gulbis
- Uvis Helmanis
- Kristaps Janičenoks
- Mareks Jurevičus
- Ernests Kalve
- Rihards Kuksiks
- Toms Leimanis
- Mārtiņš Meiers
- Kārlis Muižnieks
- Ivars Timermanis
- Jānis Timma
- Mārtiņš Skirmants
- Artūrs Strēlnieks
- Jānis Strēlnieks
- Andrejs Šeļakovs
- Aigars Šķēle
- Armands Šķēle
- Žanis Peiners
- Juris Umbraško
- Raimonds Vaikulis
- Arnis Vecvagars
- Sandis Valters
- Ronalds Zaķis
- Uģis Viļums
- Aigars Vītols
- Akselis Vairogs
- Perttu Blomgren
- Marijonas Petravičius
- Kęstutis Šeštokas
- Simas Buterlevičius
- Edgaras Želionis
- Vladimir Štimac
- Bojan Bakić
- Georgios Tsiakos
- Dušan Jelić
- Nikos Gkikas
- Akin Akingbala
- Weyinmi Efejuku
- Emmanuel Ubilla
- Mike Lenzly
- Rashad Anderson
- Jimmy Baxter
- Tyrone Brazelton
- Rasheed Brokenborough
- Dominez Burnett
- Folarin Campbell
- Tweety Carter
- Warren Carter
- Mire Chatman
- Willie Deane
- (United States) Daeshon Francis
- John Gilchrist
- Jerai Grant
- Steven Gray
- Blake Hamilton
- Brandon Hunter
- Ted Jeffries
- Michael-Hakim Jordan
- Justin Love
- Bernard King
- Willie Kemp
- Chester Mason
- Dan McClintock
- Gerry McNamara
- Eddie Shannon
- Casey Shaw
- Jamaal Tatum
- Terrance Thomas
- Lorenzo Williams
- Brent Wright
- Jahmar Young

== Notable coaches ==
- (Latvia) Armands Krauliņš
- (Latvia) Kārlis Muižnieks
- (Latvia) Agris Galvanovskis
- (Latvia) Guntis Endzels
- (Latvia) Gundars Vētra
- (Slovenia) Gašper Okorn
- (Croatia) Silvano Poropat
- (Lithuania) Algirdas Brazys
- (Latvia) Roberts Štelmahers
- (Latvia) Artūrs Visockis-Rubenis
