= Artūrs Visockis-Rubenis =

Latvian basketball coach (born 1985)

BK Ogre
- Position: Head coach

Personal information
- Born: August 11, 1985 (age 41) Riga, Latvian SSR, USSR

Career history

Coaching
- 2011–2016: Latvijas Universitāte
- 2015–2017: Latvia (women) (assistant)
- 2016: Latvia U16
- 2016–2019: BK Ogre
- 2017–2019: Latvia (assistant)
- 2018: Latvia U18
- 2019: Latvia U19
- 2019–2020: BK Ventspils
- 2020–2026: BK Liepāja
- 2021–present: Latvia (assistant)
- 2026-present: BK Ogre

Career highlights
- As head coach: Latvian Coach of the Year (2018)
Medals
Men's basketball
Representing Latvia
FIBA Europe Under-18 Championship
Silver medal – second place	2018 Latvia	National Team

Artūrs Visockis-Rubenis (born August 11, 1985) is a Latvian professional basketball coach, who is currently a head coach for BK Ogre, and an assistant for Jānis Gailītis in Latvian National Team.

== Career ==
From 2011 till 2016 he worked as a head coach of Latvijas Universitāte, reaching Latvian League semi-finals in his debut season. From 2016 till 2019 he worked as head coach for BK Ogre, guiding them to first Latvian league medals in club's history. In summer of 2019 Visockis-Rubenis signed with 10-time Latvian champions BK Ventspils and debuted in FIBA Europe Cup level helping the team to reach the quarterfinals. In summer of 2020 Visockis-Rubenis became a head coach for BK Liepāja, signing a multi-year contract.

== National teams ==
In 2015 he was named Latvian U16 team head coach and led the team in 2016 FIBA Europe Under-16 Championship.

From 2015 Visockis-Rubenis is also an assistant coach of Latvia women's national basketball team, participating in EuroBasket Women 2017 (6th place) and 2018 FIBA Women's Basketball World Cup. In 2017, Visockis-Rubenis was also appointed as an assistant for Men's National Team, participating in EuroBasket 2017 (5th place) and 2019 FIBA Basketball World Cup qualification.

In 2018 Visockis-Rubenis was named Latvian U18 head coach and led his team to historical 2018 FIBA Europe Under-18 Championship silver - it was the first time Latvian U18 team went to the final. Team qualified for 2019 FIBA Under-19 Basketball World Cup. Later that year federation named Visockis-Rubenis also the head coach of U19 National Team for World Cup.

Since 2017, Visockis-Rubenis has been assistant in Latvia National Team for Ainars Bagatskis, Arnis Vecvagars, Luca Banchi, Sito Alonso and Jānis Gailītis. He was part of the coaching stuff at the 2023 FIBA Basketball World Cup where Latvia finished at 5th place.

== Honors and awards ==
=== Club career ===
- (Latvia) BK Ogre (2016-2019)
  - Latvian Basketball League Bronze: (2019)
- (Latvia) BK Ventspils (2019–2020)
  - Latvian Basketball League Bronze: (2020)
- (Latvia) BK Liepāja (2020–2026)
  - Latvian Basketball League Bronze: (2023)

=== Individual ===
- Latvian Coach of the Year: (2018)

=== National team ===
- FIBA Europe U-18 Championship Runner Up: (2018)
