= Latvijas Universitāte men's basketball =

Latvian basketball club

Latvijas Universitāte
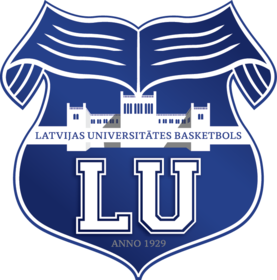
- Nickname: LU; Studenti (Students)
- Leagues: Latvian Basketball League; Latvian-Estonian Basketball League
- Founded: 1929
- Arena: Oskara Kalpaka Rīgas Tautas daiļamatu pamatskola (school hall)
- Capacity: 258
- Location: Riga, Latvia
- Team colors: Blue and White
- President: Kārlis Dārznieks
- Head coach: Marts Ozolinkēvičs
- Championships: 7 Latvian Championship
- Website: bk.lu.lv
| Home | Away |

The Latvijas Universitāte men's basketball team represents the University of Latvia in Riga, Latvia, also known as LU and it plays in the Latvian Basketball League and Latvian-Estonian Basketball League.

== History ==
The team is organized by the Universitātes Sports society, founded on 29 January 1929 under the auspices of the LU, and the LU Sports Center (LU Sporta centrs). The team used the Universitātes Sports name from 1929 until the Soviet occupation of Latvia in 1940, and again shortly around 2014.

The LU once won seven Latvian championships in the 1930s and returned to the Latvian League Division 1 before the 2010–11 season. The biggest accomplishment so far has been 4th place in the 2011–2012 season.

== Youth side ==
A youth side of the team was formed together with the Riga Basketball School with the name of LU/BS Rīga, which last played in the second-division Ramirent Nacionālā basketbola līga (NBL, former LBL2) in the 2023/24 season. In 2024, they were succeeded by Mārupes NSS/LU, as the university partnered up with the Mārupe Municipality Sports School.

== Season by season record ==
| Season | League | Regional | Latvian Cup | Head coach |
|---|---|---|---|---|
| 2023-24 | Latvian League; Did not qualify | Latvian–Estonian League; 14th place | Latvian Cup; Quarterfinals | Gunārs Gailītis |
| 2024-25 | Latvian League; Did not qualify | Latvian–Estonian League; 15th place | Latvian Cup; Quarterfinals | Gunārs Gailītis / Marts Ozolinkēvičs |
| 2025-26 | Latvian League; Did not qualify | Latvian–Estonian League; 13th place | Latvian Cup; Quarterfinals | Marts Ozolinkēvičs |

== Players ==
=== Current roster ===
Note: Flags indicate national team eligibility at FIBA-sanctioned events. Players may hold other non-FIBA nationalities not displayed.

Latvijas Universitāte 2026-27 roster
Players
Coaches

| Pos. | No. | Nat. | Name | Ht. | Wt. | Age |
|---|---|---|---|---|---|---|
| SG | 0 | (United States) | Thomas, Reggie | 1.85 m (6 ft 1 in) | 93 kg (205 lb) | 23 – 23 September 2003 |
| SF | 1 | (Latvia) | Drava, Verners | 2.03 m (6 ft 8 in) | 81 kg (179 lb) | 20 – 30 January 2006 |
| SG | 3 | (Latvia) | Lastiņš, Markuss | 1.94 m (6 ft 4 in) | 90 kg (198 lb) | 22 – 11 May 2004 |
| PG | 5 | (United States) | McKinney, Wayne | 1.82 m (6 ft 0 in) | 83 kg (183 lb) | 24 – 5 September 2002 |
| SG | 7 | (Latvia) | Peiners, Timurs | 1.91 m (6 ft 3 in) | 75 kg (165 lb) | 19 – 12 November 2006 |
| PF | 9 | (Latvia) | Piternieks, Mārtiņš | 1.98 m (6 ft 6 in) | 93 kg (205 lb) | 20 – 12 April 2006 |
| PG | 15 | (Latvia) | Andževs, Adrians | 1.93 m (6 ft 4 in) | 82 kg (181 lb) | 19 – 23 February 2007 |
| PF | 21 | (Latvia) | Ginters, Ronalds | 2.01 m (6 ft 7 in) | 95 kg (209 lb) | 20 – 21 August 2006 |
| SF | 23 | (United States) | Hayes IV, PJ | 1.98 m (6 ft 6 in) | 92 kg (203 lb) | 25 – 25 July 2001 |
| PF | 24 | (Latvia) | Kaupmanis, Harijs | 2.01 m (6 ft 7 in) | 94 kg (207 lb) | 21 – 19 February 2005 |
| PG | 29 | (Latvia) | Katlaps, Pauls | 1.89 m (6 ft 2 in) | 83 kg (183 lb) | 20 – 12 March 2006 |
| SG | 30 | (Latvia) | Kazāks, Artūrs | 1.92 m (6 ft 4 in) | 89 kg (196 lb) | 20 – 28 December 2005 |
| PG | 49 | (Latvia) | Bergmanis, Oto | 1.96 m (6 ft 5 in) | 96 kg (212 lb) | 18 – 18 December 2007 |
| SG | 66 | (Ukraine) | Koshevatskyi, Liev | 1.92 m (6 ft 4 in) | 82 kg (181 lb) | 23 – 19 September 2003 |

Head coach

- (Latvia) Marts Ozolinkēvičs

Assistant coach(es)

- (Latvia) Krišjānis Pētersons

Strength & conditioning coach(es)

- (Latvia) Artūrs Paiķis

Physiotherapist(s)

- (Latvia) Annija Sileniece

Legend

- (C) Team captain
- Injured

- Roster
Updated: September 21, 2026

=== Depth chart ===
| Pos. | Starting 5 | Bench 1 | Reserve | Bench 3 |
|---|---|---|---|---|
| C | Ronalds Ginters | Gustavs Alberts Gumbelis | Harijs Kaupmanis |
| PF | Rodrigo Jugans | Mārtiņš Piternieks |
| SF | PJ Hayes IV | Verners Drava | Markuss Lastiņš |
| SG | Wayne McKinney III | Pauls Katlaps | Oto Bergmanis | Timurs Peiners |
| PG | Adrians Andževs | Liev Koshevatskyi | Reggie Thomas | Artūrs Kazāks |

=== Squad changes for the 2026–27 season ===
==== In ====
Note: Flags indicate national team, as has been defined under FIBA eligibility rules. Players may hold more than one non-FIBA nationality.

| No. | Pos. | Nat. | Player |
|---|---|---|---|
| | SG | (Latvia) LAT | Markuss Lastiņš (from (Latvia) BK Ogre) |
| | SF | (Latvia) LAT | Ronalds Ginters (from (Latvia) (2) Mārupes NSS/LU) |
| | PG | (Latvia) LAT | Adrians Andževs (from (Latvia) VEF Rīga) |
| | SF | (United States) USA | PJ Hayes IV (from (United States) (2) Grand Rapids Gold) |
| | SG | (United States) USA | Reggie Thomas (from (NCAA) North Dakota Fighting Hawks) |
| | PG | (United States) USA | Wayne McKinney (from (NCAA) San Diego State Aztecs) |
| | SG | (Ukraine) UKR | LEV Koshevatskyi (from (Ukraine) BC Cherkaski Mavpy) |

==== Out ====
Note: Flags indicate national team, as has been defined under FIBA eligibility rules. Players may hold more than one non-FIBA nationality.

| No. | Pos. | Nat. | Player |
|---|---|---|---|
| 28 | PG | (Latvia) LAT | Francis Neilands (to (Latvia) BK Liepāja) |
| 13 | C | (Latvia) LAT | Rūdis Donis (to NCAA (2) - Wayne State University) |
| 2 | PG | (United States) USA | Zion Styles (free agent) |
| 4 | SG | (United States) USA | Marlon Xavier Short (free agent) |
| 11 | SF | (United States) USA | Brody Clyde Fox (free agent) |
| 9 | C | (Latvia) LAT | Daniils Smirnovs (free agent) |

== Coaches ==
- (Latvia) Mārtiņš Zībarts: 2010–2011
- (Latvia) Artūrs Visockis-Rubenis: 2011-2016
- (Latvia) Guntis Endzels: 2016–2022
- (Latvia) Gunārs Gailītis: 2022–2025
- (Latvia) Marts Ozolinkēvičs: 2025–present
