= Latvian–Estonian Basketball League =

Latvian-Estonian Basketball League
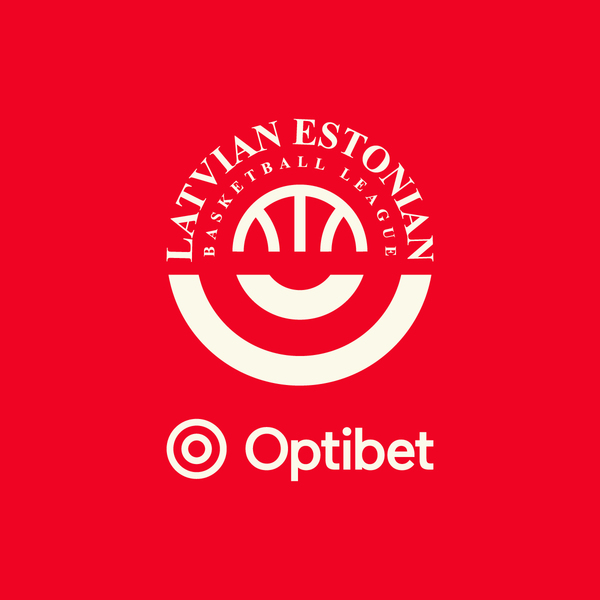
- Founded: 2018; 8 years ago
- First season: 2018–19
- Countries: Estonia (7 teams); Latvia (8 teams)
- Confederation: FIBA Europe
- Number of teams: 15
- Current champions: (Latvia) Valmiera Glass VIA (1st title)
- Most championships: (Ukraine) BC Prometey (Latvia) VEF Rīga (2 titles)
- TV partners: Delfi TV, Inspira, LTV7, TV4
- Website: estlatbl.com
- 2026–27 season

The Latvian-Estonian Basketball League (Latvian: Latvijas—Igaunijas Basketbola līga, Estonian: Eesti-Läti Korvpalliliiga), is the top-tier men's basketball league in Latvia and Estonia. The competition was introduced in 2018 and is organised by the Estonian Basketball Association and the Latvian Basketball Association.

== History ==
Following the demise of the Baltic Basketball League, the LEBL was established in 2018 when the Latvijas Basketbola līga (LBL) and the Korvpalli Meistriliiga (KML) largely merged. In its inaugural season, 15 teams participated in the league. After a Final Four is played to determine the winner of the league, there are playoffs to decide the national champions of Latvia and Estonia. The first game was played on 28 September 2018, with Estonian champions BC Kalev/Cramo hosting a game against the Latvian champions BK Ventspils. On 9 April 2019, BK Ventspils won the first league championship. On 19 November 2021, representatives of the Latvian Basketball Association and the Estonian Basketball Association agreed to continue the development of a joint league for the next three years. Both parties acknowledged that the league promotes the development of players and coaches, attracts basketball fans and inspires young people to focus on basketball.

In June 2022, Ukrainian club BC Prometey joined the league as the Ukrainian SuperLeague was suspended due to the 2022 Russian invasion of Ukraine. The team played its home games in Riga.

=== Title sponsorships ===
Since inaugural season, the League has had title sponsorship rights sold to two companies, most recently to the Optibet betting company.

Period	Sponsor	Name
2018–2019	Olympic Entertainment Group	OlyBet Latvian-Estonian Basketball League
2019–2024	Paf	Paf Latvian-Estonian Basketball League
2024–2026	Optibet	Optibet Latvian-Estonian Basketball League

== Competition format ==
The competition follows a double round-robin format. During the course of a season each club plays each other club twice (once at home and once away). Teams' rankings at season end are determined by winning percentage. At season end, the eight top teams play-off, pitting the first place standings team against the 8th place team, and so on. The play-off format initially was supposed to be Quarterfinals and Final Four, but since the inaugural season it has changed every season.

For the 2023–24 season play-off format changed. Quarterfinals and semifinals are to be played in best-of-three series, while bronze and gold medals are to be played out in one game with hosts being a team that finished regular season higher in the standings.

=== Home Grown Player Rule ===
A foreign player (not Latvian or Estonian) who has been registered and played in the Latvian National Championship or the Estonian National Championship for three consecutive seasons between the ages of 12 and 19 is considered to be a local player.

== Current teams ==
Location of teams in 2026–27 Latvian–Estonian Basketball League

Team	Home city	Arena	Capacity
(Estonia) BC Pärnu	Pärnu	Pärnu Sports Hall	1,820
(Estonia) Bigbank/Kalev	Tallinn	Nord Sports Hall	1,066
(Latvia) BK Liepāja	Liepāja	Liepāja Olympic Center	2,542
(Latvia) BK Ogre	Ogre	Arēna Ogre	1,700
(Latvia) BK Ventspils	Ventspils	Ventspils Olympic Center	3,085
(Estonia) Keila Basket	Keila	Keila Health Center	800
(Estonia) Keila KK	Keila	Keila Health Center	800
(Latvia) Latvijas Universitāte	Riga	O. Kalpaka RTDP	258
(Latvia) Rigas Ekselences Juniori	Riga	Latvian Team Sports Hall	2,900
(Latvia) Rīgas Zeļļi	Riga	Latvian Team Sports Hall	2,900
(Estonia) TalTech/ALEXELA	Tallinn	TalTech Sports Hall	1,000
(Estonia) Tartu Ülikool Maks & Moorits	Tartu	University of Tartu Sports Hall	2,600
(Latvia) Valmiera Glass VIA	Valmiera	Valmiera Olympic Center	1,500
(Latvia) VEF Rīga	Riga	Rimi Olympic Sports Center	830
(Estonia) Viimsi	Haabneeme	Forus Sports Center	500

== Results ==
Season	Final			Third and fourth place		
Season	Winners	Score	Second place	Third place	Score	Fourth place
2018–19; Details	(Latvia); BK Ventspils	102–80	(Latvia); VEF Rīga	(Estonia); BC Kalev/Cramo	87–85	(Latvia); BK Ogre
2019–20; Details	Curtailed and voided due to the COVID-19 pandemic					
2020–21; Details	(Estonia); BC Kalev/Cramo	86–75	(Latvia); VEF Rīga	(Latvia); BK Ogre	75–73	(Estonia); AVIS UTILITAS Rapla
2021–22; Details	(Latvia); VEF Rīga	95–64	(Estonia); KK Viimsi/Sportland	(Estonia); Pärnu Sadam	84–77	(Latvia); BK Ogre
2022–23; Details	(Ukraine); BC Prometey	77–62	(Latvia); VEF Rīga	(Estonia); Tartu Ülikool Maks & Moorits	63–60	(Estonia); BC Kalev/Cramo
2023–24; Details	(Ukraine); BC Prometey	91–83	(Estonia); BC Kalev/Cramo	(Latvia); VEF Rīga	84–76	(Latvia); BK Ventspils
2024–25; Details	(Latvia); VEF Rīga	88–82	(Latvia); Rīgas Zeļļi	(Estonia); BC Kalev/Cramo	92–69	(Latvia); BK Ogre
2025–26; Details	(Latvia); Valmiera Glass VIA	100–95	(Estonia); Tartu Ülikool Maks & Moorits	(Latvia); VEF Rīga	87–72	(Estonia); Kalev/Cramo

== Performance by club ==
Club	Winners	Runners-up	Years won	Years runner-up
(Latvia) VEF Rīga	2	3	2022, 2025	2019, 2021, 2023
(Ukraine) BC Prometey	2	0	2023, 2024	–
(Estonia) Kalev/Cramo	1	1	2021	2024
(Latvia) BK Ventspils	1	0	2019	–
(Latvia) Valmiera Glass VIA	1	0	2026	–
(Estonia) Viimsi	0	1	–	2022
(Latvia) Rīgas Zeļļi	0	1	–	2025
(Estonia) Tartu Ülikool Maks & Moorits	0	1	–	2026

== Records ==
=== Player records ===
The following records include games played since the league was established in 2018. These records do not include any games played in local championship playoffs, Latvian Basketball League and Estonian Basketball League respectively.

- Highest Performance Index Rating (PIR) in a game

- 60 by (Croatia) Matej Radunić ( (Estonia) Keila KK), against Valmiera Glass VIA on 17 March 2023

- Most points in a game

- 41 by (United States) Jalen Riley ( (Latvia) VEF Rīga), against BK Liepāja on 5 February 2022
- 41 by (Croatia) Matej Radunić ( (Estonia) Keila KK), against Valmiera Glass VIA on 17 March 2023
- 41 by (Latvia) Roberts Blūms ( (Latvia) VEF Rīga), against Tallinn Kalev/SNABB on 21 January 2024

- Most rebounds in a game

- 24 by (Latvia) Kristaps Dārgais ( (Latvia) BK Ogre), against Viimsi on 19 November 2025

- Most assists in a game

- 22 by (United States) Tony Wroten ( (Estonia) BC Kalev/Cramo), against Jēkabpils/SMScredit.lv on 24 January 2019

- Most steals in a game

- 10 by (United States) Alterique Gilbert ( (Estonia) Pärnu Sadam), against BK Liepāja on 5 March 2022
- 10 by (United States) Kevin Johnson ( (Estonia) Keila KK), against Viimsi on 24 September 2023

- Most blocks in a game

- 7 by (Latvia) Klāvs Čavars ( (Latvia) VEF Rīga), against Jēkabpils/SMScredit.lv on 9 February 2019
- 7 by (Slovakia) Tomáš Pavelka ( (Estonia) Tartu Ülikool Maks & Moorits), against Pärnu Sadam on 7 December 2022
- 7 by (United States) Quion Burns ( (Estonia) Keila KK), against TalTech/ALEXELA on 12 November 2025

- Most 3-point field goals made in a game

- 11 by (United States) Jalen Riley ( (Latvia) VEF Rīga), against BK Liepāja on 5 February 2022

=== Team records ===
- Biggest home win:

(Estonia) BC Kalev/Cramo 122–48 (Estonia) Keila KK in the 2024–25 season

- Biggest away win:

(Estonia) Tallinn Kalev/SNABB 52–110 (Ukraine) BC Prometey in the 2023–24 season

- Longest winning streak:

24 games by (Estonia) BC Kalev/Cramo in the 2023–24 season

- Largest attendance at a game:

5,972 – (Latvia) VEF Rīga against (Latvia) Rīgas Zeļļi at Xiaomi Arena on 13 April 2025

== See also ==
- Korvpalli Meistriliiga
- Latvijas Basketbola līga
