= 2016–17 Baltic Basketball League =

- Season: 2016–17
- Duration: 11 October 2016 – 6 April 2017
- Games played: 116
- Teams: 18
- TV partner(s): Viasat Sport Baltic, Delfi TV

Regular season
- Top seed: University of Tartu

Finals
- Champions: Vytautas (First title)
- Runners-up: Pieno žvaigždės
- Third place: University of Tartu
- Fourth place: Kalev/Cramo
- Finals MVP: (Lithuania) Tomas Delininkaitis

Statistical leaders
| Points | (United States) Trevin Parks | 21.57 |
| Rebounds | (Netherlands) Thomas van der Mars | 11.43 |
| Assists | (Croatia) Toni Prostran | 9.33 |

The 2016–17 Triobet Baltic Basketball League was the 13th season of the Baltic Basketball League and the second under the title sponsorship of Triobet. The season began on 11 October 2016 and concluded on 6 April 2017. Vytautas defeated Pieno žvaigždės in the finals to win their first Baltic Basketball League title.

== Overview ==
This season’s competition includes 7 teams from Estonia, 6 teams from Latvia, 3 teams from Lithuania and one team from Kazakhstan and Belarus, which will play all their games away. For the regular season the teams were divided into two groups of seven teams and competed in a round-robin competition system, with team facing each of their opponents twice. The teams qualified for the eighth-finals based on their ranking after the regular season. Twelve clubs from the regular season advanced to play-offs and will be joined by three Estonian and one Lithuanian club, all of whom have been knocked out of other European competitions. The four clubs joining directly in the play-offs will be University of Tartu, Vytautas, Kalev/Cramo and TLÜ/Kalev, all seeded respectively 1-through-4, based on their accomplishments and combined results of the past three seasons in domestic leagues and Triobet BBL. All play-off games are played in home-and-away series.

== Teams ==
Key to colors
| Champion | Runner-up | Third place | Fourth place | Quarterfinalist | Top 16 | Regular season |

| Country (League) | Teams | Teams (ranking in 2015–16 national championship) | | | | | | |
|---|---|---|---|---|---|---|---|---|
| Estonia (KML) | 7 | Kalev/Cramo (1) | University of Tartu (2) | AVIS Rapla (3) | TLÜ/Kalev (4) | Rakvere Tarvas/Palmse Metall (5) | Port of Pärnu (6) | TTÜ (7) |
| Latvia (LBL) | 6 | Valmiera/ORDO (1) | Liepāja/Triobet (4) | Jūrmala/Fēnikss (5) | Jēkabpils (7) | Barons kvartāls (8) | Ogre/Kumho Tyre (10) | |
| Lithuania (LKL) | 3 | Vytautas (5) | Pieno žvaigždės (8) | Nevėžis (9) | | | | |
| Kazakhstan (KBC) | 1 | Barsy Atyrau (1) | | | | | | |
| Belarus (BPL) | 1 | Borisfen Mogilev (3) | | | | | | |

=== Team information ===
| Group | Team | City, Country | Arena | Head coach |
|---|---|---|---|---|
| Group A | (Estonia) AVIS Rapla | Rapla, Estonia | Sadolin Sports Hall | (Estonia) Aivar Kuusmaa |
| Group A | (Estonia) Port of Pärnu | Pärnu, Estonia | Pärnu Sports Hall | (Estonia) Heiko Rannula |
| Group A | (Latvia) Liepāja/Triobet | Liepāja, Latvia | Liepāja Olympic Center | (Latvia) Agris Galvanovskis |
| Group A | (Latvia) Jūrmala/Fēnikss | Jūrmala, Latvia | Taurenītis | (Latvia) Arnis Vecvagars |
| Group A | (Latvia) Barons kvartāls | Riga, Latvia | Daugavas Sporta nams | (Latvia) Mārtiņš Gulbis |
| Group A | (Lithuania) Nevėžis | Kėdainiai, Lithuania | Kėdainiai Arena | (Lithuania) Paulius Juodis |
| Group A | (Kazakhstan) Barsy Atyrau | Atyrau, Kazakhstan | The team will play away | (Serbia) Boyan Salatyc |
| Group B | (Estonia) Rakvere Tarvas/Palmse Metall | Rakvere, Estonia | Rakvere Sports Hall | (Estonia) Andres Sõber |
| Group B | (Estonia) TTÜ | Tallinn, Estonia | TTÜ Sports Hall | (Estonia) Rait Käbin |
| Group B | (Latvia) Valmiera/ORDO | Valmiera, Latvia | Vidzeme Olympic Center | (Latvia) Uvis Helmanis |
| Group B | (Latvia) Jēkabpils | Jēkabpils, Latvia | Jēkabpils Sporta nams | (Latvia) Rūdolfs Rozītis |
| Group B | (Latvia) Ogre/Kumho Tyre | Ogre, Latvia | Ogre 1st Secondary School | (Latvia) Arturs Visockis-Rubenis |
| Group B | (Lithuania) Pieno žvaigždės | Pasvalys, Lithuania | Pieno žvaigždės Arena | (Lithuania) Ramūnas Cvirka |
| Group B | (Belarus) Borisfen Mogilev | Mogilev, Belarus | The team will play away | (Belarus) Aliaksandr Huliayeu |
| Playoffs | (Estonia) Kalev/Cramo | Tallinn, Estonia | Saku Suurhall | (Estonia) Alar Varrak |
| Playoffs | (Estonia) University of Tartu | Tartu, Estonia | University of Tartu Sports Hall | (Estonia) Gert Kullamäe |
| Playoffs | (Estonia) TLÜ/Kalev | Tallinn, Estonia | Kalev Sports Hall | (Estonia) Raido Roos |
| Playoffs | (Lithuania) Vytautas | Prienai/Birštonas, Lithuania | Prienai Arena | (Lithuania) Virginijus Šeškus |

== Regular season ==
Location of teams of the 2016–17 Baltic Basketball League

In each group, teams played against each other home-and-away in a round-robin format. The six first qualified teams advanced to the Play-offs, while the last teams were eliminated. The regular season began on 11 October 2016 and concluded on 25 January 2017. Rakvere Tarvas/Palmse Metall were disqualified from the Playoffs after forfeiting the regular season away match against Jēkabpils on 25 January 2017 with Barsy Atyrau advancing instead.

=== Group A ===
| Pos | Team | Pld | W | L | PF | PA | PD | Qualification |
|---|---|---|---|---|---|---|---|---|
| 1 | (Latvia) Barons kvartāls | 12 | 10 | 2 | 1036 | 941 | +95 | Advance to the Play-offs |
| 2 | (Lithuania) Nevėžis | 12 | 8 | 4 | 1025 | 880 | +145 | Advance to the Play-offs |
| 3 | (Estonia) AVIS Rapla | 12 | 8 | 4 | 913 | 868 | +45 | Advance to the Play-offs |
| 4 | (Latvia) Jūrmala/Fēnikss | 12 | 6 | 6 | 871 | 848 | +23 | Advance to the Play-offs |
| 5 | (Latvia) Liepāja/Triobet | 12 | 5 | 7 | 984 | 988 | −4 | Advance to the Play-offs |
| 6 | (Estonia) Port of Pärnu | 12 | 3 | 9 | 889 | 972 | −83 | Advance to the Play-offs |
| 7 | (Kazakhstan) Barsy Atyrau | 12 | 2 | 10 | 863 | 1084 | −221 | Advance to the Play-offs |

Source: BBL

=== Group B ===
| Pos | Team | Pld | W | L | PF | PA | PD | Qualification |
|---|---|---|---|---|---|---|---|---|
| 1 | (Lithuania) Pieno žvaigždės | 12 | 11 | 1 | 1091 | 860 | +231 | Advance to the Play-offs |
| 2 | (Latvia) Valmiera/ORDO | 12 | 9 | 3 | 924 | 788 | +136 | Advance to the Play-offs |
| 3 | (Latvia) Jēkabpils | 12 | 8 | 4 | 943 | 830 | +113 | Advance to the Play-offs |
| 4 | (Latvia) Ogre/Kumho Tyre | 12 | 6 | 6 | 907 | 872 | +35 | Advance to the Play-offs |
| 5 | (Estonia) TTÜ | 12 | 5 | 7 | 972 | 996 | −24 | Advance to the Play-offs |
| 6 | (Estonia) Tarvas/Palmse Metall | 12 | 3 | 9 | 740 | 865 | −125 | |
| 7 | (Belarus) Borisfen Mogilev | 12 | 0 | 12 | 712 | 1078 | −366 | |

Source: BBL
1. Tarvas/Palmse Metall were disqualified from the Playoffs after forfeiting the away match against Jēkabpils.

== Playoffs ==
=== Bracket ===
Round of 16; 6 February 2017 – 22 February 2017
1 | (Estonia) University of Tartu | 83 | 74 | 157
16 | (Kazakhstan) Barsy Atyrau | 49 | 45 | 94
8 | (Lithuania) Nevėžis | 78 | 77 | 155
9 | (Latvia) Jēkabpils | 74 | 80 | 154
4 | (Estonia) TLÜ/Kalev | 75 | 73 | 148
13 | (Latvia) Liepāja/Triobet | 92 | 86 | 178
5 | (Lithuania) Pieno žvaigždės | 75 | 97 | 172
12 | (Latvia) Ogre/Kumho Tyre | 83 | 64 | 147
2 | (Lithuania) Vytautas | 100 | 89 | 189
15 | (Estonia) Port of Pärnu | 55 | 54 | 109
7 | (Latvia) Valmiera/ORDO | 78 | 87 | 165
10 | (Estonia) AVIS Rapla | 65 | 81 | 146
3 | (Estonia) Kalev/Cramo | 101 | 92 | 193
14 | (Estonia) TTÜ | 63 | 72 | 135
6 | (Latvia) Barons kvartāls | 85 | 80 | 165
11 | (Latvia) Jūrmala/Fēnikss | 54 | 82 | 136

Quarterfinals; 28 February 2017 – 9 March 2017
1 | (Estonia) University of Tartu | 86 | 92 | 178
8 | (Lithuania) Nevėžis | 88 | 78 | 166
13 | (Latvia) Liepāja/Triobet | 80 | 93 | 173
5 | (Lithuania) Pieno žvaigždės | 89 | 109 | 198
2 | (Lithuania) Vytautas | 102 | 64 | 166
7 | (Latvia) Valmiera/ORDO | 71 | 74 | 145
3 | (Estonia) Kalev/Cramo | 100 | 66 | 166
6 | (Latvia) Barons kvartāls | 81 | 77 | 158

Semifinals; 14 March 2017 – 23 March 2017
1 | (Estonia) University of Tartu | 88 | 75 | 163
5 | (Lithuania) Pieno žvaigždės | 88 | 82 | 170
2 | (Lithuania) Vytautas | 88 | 88 | 176
3 | (Estonia) Kalev/Cramo | 94 | 77 | 171

Finals; 29 March 2017 – 5 April 2017
5 | (Lithuania) Pieno žvaigždės | 88 | 74 | 162
2 | (Lithuania) Vytautas | 85 | 89 | 174

| Third place series 28 March 2017 – 6 April 2017 |
| 1 | (Estonia) University of Tartu | 72 | 67 | 139 |
| 3 | (Estonia) Kalev/Cramo | 60 | 68 | 128 |

== Awards ==
=== MVP of the Week ===
MVP of the Week award is given to the best individual performance on a winning team based on their efficiency rating.

Regular season

| Week | Player | Team | EFF | Ref. |
|---|---|---|---|---|
| 1 | (Netherlands) Thomas van der Mars | (Estonia) AVIS Rapla | 34 | |
| 2 | (Latvia) Dāvis Rozītis | (Latvia) Liepāja/Triobet | 27 | |
| 3 | (Latvia) Karlis Apsitis | (Latvia) Ogre/Kumho Tyre | 28 | |
| 4 | (Netherlands) Thomas van der Mars (2) | (Estonia) AVIS Rapla | 25 | |
| 5 | (Latvia) Rinalds Sirsniņš | (Latvia) Jēkabpils | 24 | |
| 6 | (United States) Justin Baker | (Estonia) Tarvas/Palmse Metall | 29 | |
| 7 | (Netherlands) Thomas van der Mars (3) | (Estonia) AVIS Rapla | 28 | |
| 8 | (Ukraine) Andriy Agafonov | (Lithuania) Pieno žvaigždės | 33 | |
| 9 | (Lithuania) Ignas Fiodorovas | (Lithuania) Pieno žvaigždės | 33 | |
| 10 | (Latvia) Edgars Jeromanovs | (Latvia) Jūrmala/Fēnikss | 51 | |
| 11 | (Lithuania) Karolis Petrukonis | (Lithuania) Nevėžis | 32 | |
| 12 | (Estonia) Sten Olmre | (Estonia) TTÜ | 32 | |
| 13 | (Estonia) Mihkel Kirves | (Estonia) Port of Pärnu | 34 | |
| 14 | (Serbia) Nikola Vujović | (Estonia) TTÜ | 35 | |
| 15 | (Latvia) Viktors Iļjins | (Latvia) Jūrmala/Fēnikss | 29 | |

Playoffs

| Week | Player | Team | EFF | Ref. |
|---|---|---|---|---|
| 16 | (Latvia) Dāvis Rozītis (2) | (Latvia) Barons kvartāls | 33 | |
| 17 | (Latvia) Jurijs Aleksejevs | (Latvia) Jēkabpils | 31 | |
| 18 | (Belarus) Vitali Liutych | (Estonia) Kalev/Cramo | 49 | |
| 19 | (Lithuania) Dominykas Milka | (Estonia) University of Tartu | 29 | |
| 20 | (Ukraine) Andriy Agafonov (2) | (Lithuania) Pieno žvaigždės | 29 | |
| 21 | (Lithuania) Regimantas Miniotas | (Lithuania) Vytautas | 23 | |
| 22 | (Estonia) Janari Jõesaar | (Estonia) University of Tartu | 25 | |

=== MVP of the Month ===
| Month | Player | Team | Ref. |
|---|---|---|---|
| October 2016 | (Latvia) Mārtiņš Laksa | (Latvia) Valmiera/ORDO | |
| November 2016 | (Netherlands) Thomas van der Mars | (Estonia) AVIS Rapla | |
| December 2016 | (Latvia) Edgars Jeromanovs | (Latvia) Jūrmala/Fēnikss | |
| January 2017 | (Lithuania) Denis Krestinin | (Latvia) Barons kvartāls | |

Source: BBL Homepage

=== Finals MVP ===
- (Lithuania) Tomas Delininkaitis ( (Lithuania) Vytautas)

== Player statistics ==
Players qualify to this category by having at least 50% games played.

=== Points ===
| Rank | Name | Team | Games | Points | PPG |
|---|---|---|---|---|---|
| 1 | (United States) Trevin Parks | (Kazakhstan) Barsy Atyrau | 14 | 302 | 21.57 |
| 2 | (Belarus) Vitali Liutych | (Estonia) Kalev/Cramo | 7 | 145 | 20.71 |
| 3 | (United States) Justin Baker | (Estonia) Rakvere Tarvas/Palmse Metall | 6 | 122 | 20.33 |

=== Assists ===
| Rank | Name | Team | Games | Assists | APG |
|---|---|---|---|---|---|
| 1 | (Croatia) Toni Prostran | (Lithuania) Nevėžis | 15 | 140 | 9.33 |
| 2 | (United States) Malcolm Griffin | (Latvia) Liepāja/Triobet | 10 | 65 | 6.50 |
| 3 | (Estonia) Kristo Saage | (Estonia) TLÜ/Kalev | 2 | 12 | 6.00 |

=== Rebounds ===
| Rank | Name | Team | Games | Rebounds | RPG |
|---|---|---|---|---|---|
| 1 | (Netherlands) Thomas van der Mars | (Estonia) AVIS Rapla | 14 | 160 | 11.43 |
| 2 | (Lithuania) Denis Krestinin | (Latvia) Barons kvartāls | 15 | 151 | 10.07 |
| 3 | (Serbia) Đorđe Dželetović | (Estonia) TLÜ/Kalev | 2 | 20 | 10.00 |

=== Efficiency ===
| Rank | Name | Team | Games | Efficiency | PIR |
|---|---|---|---|---|---|
| 1 | (United States) Justin Baker | (Estonia) Rakvere Tarvas/Palmse Metall | 6 | 137 | 22.83 |
| 2 | (Netherlands) Thomas van der Mars | (Estonia) AVIS Rapla | 14 | 318 | 22.71 |
| 3 | (Lithuania) Denis Krestinin | (Latvia) Barons kvartāls | 15 | 317 | 21.13 |
