= 2015–16 Baltic Basketball League =

- Season: 2015–16
- Duration: October 13, 2015 – April 6, 2016
- Games played: 116
- Teams: 17
- TV partner(s): Viasat Sport Baltic, Delfi TV

Regular season
- Top seed: Šiauliai

Finals
- Champions: (Lithuania) Šiauliai (3rd title)
- Runners-up: (Estonia) Tartu Ülikool/Rock
- Third place: (Lithuania) Lietkabelis
- Fourth place: (Latvia) Valmiera/ORDO
- Finals MVP: (Lithuania) Rokas Giedraitis

Statistical leaders
Points	(United States) Andrew Warren	25.6
Rebounds	(United States) Stephen Zack	11.0
Assists	(Estonia) Rait-Riivo Laane	6.6

The 2015–16 Triobet Baltic Basketball League was the 12th season of the Baltic Basketball League and the first under the title sponsorship of Triobet.

== Overview ==
This season’s competition included 6 teams from Estonia, 5 teams from Latvia and Lithuania and one team from Kazakhstan, which played all its games away. For the regular season the teams were divided into two groups of seven teams and competed in a round-robin competition system, with team facing each of their opponents twice. The teams qualified for the eighth-finals based on their ranking after the regular season. Out of the five teams who participated in FIBA Europe Cup competition – Ventspils, Juventus, Šiauliai, TÜ/Rock and Pieno žvaigždės – the latter three didn't qualify for the FIBA Europe Cup playoffs and thus begin their journey at the start of the BBL play-offs, seeded respectively first, second and third based on last season’s results. All play-off games were played in home-and-away series.

Tartu Ülikool/Rock became the first Estonian team to reach the Baltic League finals. In the Finals they lost with an aggregate score of 157–176 to Lithuanian team Šiauliai who won their third title in a row. Third place belonged to Lithuanian side Lietkabelis who beat Latvian team Valmiera/ORDO with aggregate score of 160–154.

== Teams ==
Key to colors
Champion	Runner-up	Third place	Fourth place	Quarterfinalist	Top 16	Regular season

Country (League)	Teams	Teams (ranking in 2014–15 national championship)					
Estonia (KML)	6	TÜ/Rock (1)	AVIS Rapla (3)	Rakvere Tarvas (4)	Pärnu Sadam (5)	TTÜ (7)	TLÜ/Kalev (8)
Latvia (LBL)	5	Jēkabpils (3)	Liepāja/Triobet (4)	Jūrmala/Fēnikss (5)	Barons/LDz (6)	Valmiera/ORDO (7)	
Lithuania (LKL)	5	Pieno žvaigždės (4)	Šiauliai (7)	Lietkabelis (8)	Vytautas (9)	Nevėžis (10)	
Kazakhstan (KBC)	1	Barsy Atyrau (-)					

=== Team information ===
Group	Team	City, Country	Arena	Head coach
Group A	(Estonia) AVIS Rapla	Rapla, Estonia	Sadolin Sports Hall	(Estonia) Aivar Kuusmaa
Group A	(Latvia) Barons/LDz	Riga, Latvia	Mārupe Arena	(Latvia) Agris Galvanovskis
Group A	(Lithuania) Lietkabelis	Panevėžys, Lithuania	Cido Arena	(Lithuania) Gintaras Kadžiulis
Group A	(Lithuania) Nevėžis	Kėdainiai, Lithuania	Kėdainiai Arena	(Lithuania) Ramūnas Cvirka
Group A	(Estonia) Pärnu Sadam	Pärnu, Estonia	Pärnu Sports Hall	(Estonia) Mait Käbin
Group A	(Estonia) TLÜ/Kalev	Tallinn, Estonia	Kalev Sports Hall	(Estonia) Kalle Klandorf
Group A	(Latvia) Valmiera/ORDO	Valmiera, Latvia	Vidzeme Olympic Center	(Latvia) Ainars Zvirgzdiņš
Group B	(Kazakhstan) Barsy Atyrau	Atyrau, Kazakhstan	The team will play away	(Russia) Oleg Kiselev
Group B	(Latvia) Jēkabpils	Jēkabpils, Latvia	Jēkabpils Sporta nams	(Latvia) Igors Miglinieks
Group B	(Latvia) Jūrmala/Fēnikss	Jūrmala, Latvia	Taurenītis	(Latvia) Arnis Vecvagars
Group B	(Latvia) Liepāja/Triobet	Liepāja, Latvia	Liepāja Olympic Center	(Latvia) Uvis Helmanis
Group B	(Estonia) Rakvere Tarvas	Rakvere, Estonia	Rakvere Sports Hall	(Estonia) Andres Sõber
Group B	(Estonia) TTÜ	Tallinn, Estonia	TTÜ Sports Hall	(Estonia) Rait Käbin
Group B	(Lithuania) Vytautas	Prienai/Birštonas, Lithuania	Prienai Arena	(Lithuania) Virginijus Šeškus
Playoffs	(Lithuania) Pieno žvaigždės	Pasvalys, Lithuania	Pieno žvaigždės Arena	(Lithuania) Mantas Šernius
Playoffs	(Lithuania) Šiauliai	Šiauliai, Lithuania	Šiauliai Arena	(Lithuania) Gediminas Petrauskas
Playoffs	(Estonia) TÜ/Rock	Tartu, Estonia	University of Tartu Sports Hall	(Estonia) Gert Kullamäe

== Regular season ==
Location of teams of the 2015–16 Baltic Basketball League

The Regular season ran from October 13, 2015 to January 27, 2016.

=== Group A ===
Pos	Team	Pld	W	L	PF	PA	PD	Pts	Qualification
1.	(Lithuania) Lietkabelis	12	10	2	1026	888	+138	22	Playoffs
2.	(Latvia) Valmiera/ORDO	12	9	3	941	865	+76	21	Playoffs
3.	(Estonia) AVIS Rapla	12	7	5	838	897	−59	19	Playoffs
4.	(Estonia) TLÜ/Kalev	12	6	6	895	916	−21	18	Playoffs
5.	(Lithuania) Nevėžis	12	4	8	889	909	−20	16	Playoffs
6.	(Latvia) Barons/LDz	12	4	8	910	941	−31	16	Playoffs
7.	(Estonia) Pärnu Sadam	12	2	10	899	982	−83	14	Playoffs

Last updated: February 4, 2016.
Source: BBL Homepage

=== Group B ===
Pos	Team	Pld	W	L	PF	PA	PD	Pts	Qualification
1.	(Lithuania) Vytautas	12	11	1	1005	894	+111	23	Playoffs
2.	(Latvia) Liepāja/Triobet	12	8	4	939	909	+30	20	Playoffs
3.	(Latvia) Jēkabpils	12	7	5	921	914	+7	19	Playoffs
4.	(Estonia) Rakvere Tarvas	12	6	6	914	891	+23	18	Playoffs
5.	(Latvia) Jūrmala/Fēnikss	12	5	7	884	870	+14	17	Playoffs
6.	(Kazakhstan) Barsy Atyrau	12	3	9	900	970	−70	15	Playoffs
7.	(Estonia) TTÜ	12	2	10	845	960	−115	14	Eliminated

Last updated: February 4, 2016.
Source: BBL Homepage

== Playoffs ==
=== Bracket ===
Eightfinals; February 8–25
1	(Lithuania) Šiauliai	101	85	186
16	(Estonia) Pärnu Sadam	61	80	141
8	(Latvia) Jēkabpils	65	93	158
9	(Estonia) AVIS Rapla	79	65	144
4	(Lithuania) Vytautas	83	83	166
13	(Lithuania) Nevėžis	78	107	185
5	(Lithuania) Lietkabelis	88	92	180
12	(Latvia) Jūrmala/Fēnikss	88	78	166
2	(Estonia) TÜ/Rock	105	99	204
15	(Kazakhstan) Barsy Atyrau	77	74	151
7	(Latvia) Liepāja/Triobet	74	93	167
10	(Estonia) Rakvere Tarvas	50	87	137
3	(Lithuania) Pieno žvaigždės	110	93	203
14	(Latvia) Barons/LDz	84	93	177
6	(Latvia) Valmiera/ORDO	84	87	171
11	(Estonia) TLÜ/Kalev	66	68	134

Quarterfinals; March 1–10
1	(Lithuania) Šiauliai	73	91	164
8	(Latvia) Jēkabpils	64	93	157
13	(Lithuania) Nevėžis	61	59	120
5	(Lithuania) Lietkabelis	84	64	148
2	(Estonia) TÜ/Rock	93	80	173
7	(Latvia) Liepāja/Triobet	66	76	142
3	(Lithuania) Pieno žvaigždės	71	78	149
6	(Latvia) Valmiera/ORDO	81	80	161

Semifinals; March 15–23
1	(Lithuania) Šiauliai	77	91	168
5	(Lithuania) Lietkabelis	67	79	146
2	(Estonia) TÜ/Rock	68	75	143
6	(Latvia) Valmiera/ORDO	64	68	132

Finals; March 29–April 6
1	(Lithuania) Šiauliai	74	102	176
2	(Estonia) TÜ/Rock	81	76	157

Third place series March 30–April 5
5	(Lithuania) Lietkabelis	74	86	160
6	(Latvia) Valmiera/ORDO	90	64	154

== Player statistics ==
Players qualify to this category by having at least 50% games played.

=== Points ===
Rank	Player	Team	Games	Points	Average
1	(United States) Andrew Warren	(Estonia) Pärnu Sadam	7	179	25.57
2	(Canada) Johnny Berhanemeskel	(Estonia) TLÜ/Kalev	14	264	18.86
3	(Latvia) Reinis Strupovičs	(Estonia) Rakvere Tarvas	10	175	17.50
4	(United States) Michael Burwell	(Kazakhstan) Barsy Atyrau	13	219	16.85
5	(United States) Kris Richard	(Latvia) Liepāja/Triobet	15	252	16.80

=== Assists ===
Rank	Player	Team	Games	Assists	Average
1	(Estonia) Rait-Riivo Laane	(Estonia) TTÜ	12	79	6.58
2	(Latvia) Rinalds Sirsniņš	(Latvia) Jēkabpils	13	75	5.77
3	(Serbia) Miljan Pavković	(Lithuania) Lietkabelis	13	75	5.62
4	(Latvia) Edgars Jeromanovs	(Latvia) Jūrmala/Fēnikss	14	74	5.29
5	(United States) Derrick Low	(Lithuania) Pieno žvaigždės	4	21	5.25

=== Rebounds ===
Rank	Player	Team	Games	Rebounds	Average
1	(United States) Stephen Zack	(Latvia) Liepāja/Triobet	12	132	11.00
2	(Lithuania) Ronaldas Rutkauskas	(Latvia) Jēkabpils	13	121	9.31
3	(United States) Carl Hipp	(Latvia) Barons/LDz	11	98	8.91
4	(United States) William Artino	(Estonia) AVIS Rapla	12	106	8.83
5	(United States) David Haughton	(Estonia) Rakvere Tarvas	14	122	8.71

=== Efficiency ===
Rank	Name	Team	Games	Efficiency	Average
1	(Lithuania) Giedrius Staniulis	(Lithuania) Pieno žvaigždės	3	65	21.67
2	(United States) Andrew Warren	(Estonia) Pärnu Sadam	7	147	21.00
3	(Lithuania) Paulius Petrilevičius	(Estonia) Pärnu Sadam	12	231	19.25
4	(Lithuania) Vytautas Šulskis	(Lithuania) Vytautas	13	250	19.23
5	(Lithuania) Ronaldas Rutkauskas	(Latvia) Jēkabpils	13	248	19.08

== Awards ==
=== MVP of the Month ===
Month	Player	Team	Ref.
October 2015	(United States) Andrew Warren	(Estonia) Pärnu Sadam	
November 2015	(Lithuania) Paulius Petrilevicius	(Estonia) Pärnu Sadam	
December 2015	(Lithuania) Laimonas Kisielius	(Lithuania) Vytautas	
January 2016	(Lithuania) Ronaldas Rutkauskas	(Latvia) Jēkabpils	

Last updated: February 3, 2016.
Source: BBL Homepage
