= Edmunds Elksnis =

Latvian basketball player

Personal information
- Born: November 19, 1990 (age 35) Rūjiena, Latvia
- Listed height: 1.88 m (6 ft 2 in)
- Listed weight: 91 kg (201 lb)

Career information
- Playing career: 2011–present
- Position: Point guard

Career history
- 2011–2015: BK Valmiera
- 2015–2017: Jūrmala/Fēnikss
- 2017–2018: Valmiera/Ordo
- 2018–2021: Valmiera Glass ViA
- 2021–2022: Tartu Ülikool
- 2022–2023: BK Ventspils
- 2023–2025: Valmiera Glass ViA

Career highlights
- Estonian Cup winner (2022)

Edmunds Elksnis (born November 19, 1990) is a former Latvian professional basketball player from Rūjiena, Latvia. Priot joining Valmiera Glass ViA Elksnis represented Tartu Ülikool and BK Ventspils in the Latvian–Estonian Basketball League. Elksnis is playing point guard position.

== Professional career ==
Edmunds Elksnis started his professional career with BK Valmiera in 2011, when Ainars Zvirgzdins gave a chance for young player to prove himself with Latvian Basketball League team. In his second professional season Elksnis won Latvian league bronze medal with Valmiera team, which in this time was coached by Varis Krūmiņš. Valmiera came back from 0-2 deficit in bronze series and won Barons Kvartāls with 3-2. After four seasons with Valmiera Elksnis moved to Jūrmala/Fēnikss where point guard matured into one of team leaders, proving himself as quick player who can be very productive in fast basketball demanded by Jūrmala coach Arnis Vecvagars. In September of 2017 Elksnis signed with recent Latvian champion Valmiera/Ordo. Only two years after Valmiera championship season team bankrupted and Elksnis moved to promoted Valmiera Glass ViA in Latvian-Estonian Basketball League. In 2019./2020. season Elksnis was leagues leading statistical assister before leagues suspension due to COVID-19 pandemic in Latvia.

== Latvian National Team ==
Elksnis was late bloomer, so he was not called to Latvian youth national teams. In summer of 2020 Latvian National team coach Roberts Štelmahers included Elksnis into team for Baltic Chain tournament in honor of Estonian basketball hundred years celebration. Elksnis was candidate for EuroBasket 2022 qualification, but did not make final squad.
