= 2017–18 Baltic Basketball League =

- Season: 2017–18
- Duration: 24 October 2017 – 5 April 2018
- Teams: 13 (14)
- TV partner(s): Delfi TV

Finals
- Champions: Pieno žvaigždės (First title)
- Runners-up: Jūrmala
- Third place: University of Tartu
- Fourth place: Šiauliai
- Finals MVP: (Canada) Jahenns Manigat

Statistical leaders
Points	(Belarus) Yauheni Beliankou	18.40
Rebounds	(Latvia) Viktors Iļjins	11.00
Assists	(Lithuania) Donatas Sabeckis	6.88

The 2017–18 Triobet Baltic Basketball League was the 14th and the last season of the Baltic Basketball League and the third under the title sponsorship of Triobet. The season began on 24 October 2017 and concluded on 5 April 2018. Last year's finalist Pieno žvaigždės defeated Jūrmala in the finals to win their first Baltic Basketball League title.

== Competition format ==
In this edition 14 teams took part. They were divided into two groups of seven teams where, after a double-legged round-robin, the best four of each group will qualify to the quarterfinals. Kazakh team Barsy Atyrau and Belarusian Tsmoki-Minsk II played all their matches abroad.

Midway through the season Vytautas withdrew from the league due to them forfeiting two different games in this league for different reasons. As a result, they would participate in a series of friendly matches dubbed the Big Baller Brand Challenge Games; it was created for the purpose of promoting their newest acquisitions at the time in LiAngelo Ball and LaMelo Ball.

== Team information ==
Group	Team	City, Country	Arena	Head coach
Group A	(Estonia) AVIS Rapla	Rapla, Estonia	Sadolin Sports Hall	(Estonia) Aivar Kuusmaa
Group A	(Estonia) Port of Pärnu	Pärnu, Estonia	Pärnu Sports Hall	(Estonia) Heiko Rannula
Group A	(Latvia) Betsafe/Liepāja	Liepāja, Latvia	Liepāja Olympic Center	(Latvia) Agris Galvanovskis
Group A	(Latvia) Jūrmala	Jūrmala, Latvia	Jūrmala State Gymnasium	(Latvia) Mārtiņš Gulbis
Group A	(Lithuania) Šiauliai	Šiauliai, Lithuania	Šiauliai Arena	(Lithuania) Antanas Sireika
Group A	(Lithuania) Vytautas	Prienai/Birštonas, Lithuania	Prienai Arena	(Lithuania) Virginijus Šeškus
Group A	(Belarus) Tsmoki-Minsk II	Minsk, Belarus	The team will play away	(Belarus) Rostislav Vergun
Group B	(Estonia) University of Tartu	Tartu, Estonia	University of Tartu Sports Hall	(Estonia) Priit Vene
Group B	(Estonia) TLÜ/Kalev	Tallinn, Estonia	Kalev Sports Hall	(Estonia) Gert Kullamäe
Group B	(Estonia) TTÜ	Tallinn, Estonia	TTÜ Sports Hall	(Estonia) Rait Käbin
Group B	(Latvia) Valmiera/ORDO	Valmiera, Latvia	Vidzeme Olympic Center	(Latvia) Kristaps Valters
Group B	(Latvia) Ogre	Ogre, Latvia	Ogre 1st Secondary School	(Latvia) Arturs Visockis-Rubenis
Group B	(Lithuania) Pieno žvaigždės	Pasvalys, Lithuania	Pieno žvaigždės Arena	(Lithuania) Gediminas Petrauskas
Group B	(Kazakhstan) Barsy Atyrau	Atyrau, Kazakhstan	The team will play away	(Serbia) Aleksandar Vrzina

== Regular season ==
=== Group A ===
Pos	Team	Pld	W	L	PF	PA	PD	Qualification
1	(Latvia) Jūrmala	10	9	1	823	689	+134	Qualification to playoffs
2	(Lithuania) Šiauliai	10	9	1	898	713	+185	Qualification to playoffs
3	(Estonia) AVIS Utilitas Rapla	10	5	5	788	786	+2	Qualification to playoffs
4	(Estonia) Port of Pärnu	10	3	7	757	788	−31	Qualification to playoffs
5	(Latvia) Betsafe Liepāja	10	3	7	612	765	−153	
6	(Belarus) Tsmoki-Minsk II	10	1	9	686	823	−137	
7	(Lithuania) Vytautas (Note: Vytautas forfeit and was consequently disqualified.) (D)	0	0	0	0	0	0	Disqualified

Source: BBL.net
(D) Disqualified

=== Group B ===
Pos	Team	Pld	W	L	PF	PA	PD	Qualification
1	(Lithuania) Pieno žvaigždės	12	11	1	1188	832	+356	Qualification to playoffs
2	(Estonia) University of Tartu	12	8	4	1027	905	+122	Qualification to playoffs
3	(Latvia) Ogre Kumho Tyre	12	8	4	1073	910	+163	Qualification to playoffs
4	(Estonia) TLÜ Kalev	12	7	5	978	922	+56	Qualification to playoffs
5	(Latvia) Valmiera ORDO	12	3	9	877	1109	−232	
6	(Estonia) TTÜ	12	3	9	857	998	−141	
7	(Kazakhstan) Barsy Atyrau	12	2	10	765	1089	−324	

Source: BBL.net

== Playoffs ==
In the knockout phase rounds will be played in a home-and-away format, with the overall cumulative score determining the winner of a round. Thus, the score of one single game can be tied.

=== Bracket ===
Quarterfinals; 27 February 2018 – 7 March 2018
B4	(Estonia) TLÜ Kalev	81	68	149
A1	(Latvia) Jūrmala	89	77	166
A3	(Estonia) AVIS Utilitas Rapla	67	47	114
B2	(Estonia) University of Tartu	73	76	149
B3	(Latvia) Ogre Kumho Tyre	75	87	162
A2	(Lithuania) Šiauliai	78	97	175
A4	(Estonia) Port of Pärnu	66	84	150
B1	(Lithuania) Pieno žvaigždės	96	78	174

Semifinals; 14 March 2018 – 21 March 2018
A1	(Latvia) Jūrmala	81	81	162
B2	(Estonia) University of Tartu	69	83	152
A2	(Lithuania) Šiauliai	84	64	148
B1	(Lithuania) Pieno žvaigždės	91	68	159

Finals; 28 March 2018 – 5 April 2018
A1	(Latvia) Jūrmala	80	68	148
B1	(Lithuania) Pieno žvaigždės	98	76	174
Third place
B2	(Estonia) University of Tartu	86	78	164
A2	(Lithuania) Šiauliai	88	70	158

=== Finals ===
Team #1	Agg.	Team #2	1st leg	2nd leg
Jūrmala (Latvia)	148–174	(Lithuania) Pieno žvaigždės	80–98	68–76

Game 1

28 March 2018
19:00

Boxscore

Jūrmala (Latvia)	80–98	(Lithuania) Pieno žvaigždės
Scoring by quarter: 21–20, 24–23, 17–31, 18–24
Pts: Edgars Jeromanovs 24; Rebs: Andrejs Šeļakovs 9 Asts: Edgars Jeromanovs 6		Pts: Trévon Hughes 22; Rebs: Hughes, Manigat 5 each Asts: Jahenns Manigat 8

Jūrmala State Gymnasium
Attendance: 700
Referees: Rain Peerandi (EST), Oskars Lucis (LAT), Arturas Sukys (LTU)

Game 2

5 April 2018
18:00

Boxscore

Pieno žvaigždės (Lithuania)	76–68	(Latvia) Jūrmala
Scoring by quarter: 25–18, 18–24, 22–12, 11–14
Pts: Artūrs Ausējs 19; Rebs: Jahenns Manigat 7 Asts: Jahenns Manigat 7		Pts: Ervīns Jonāts 15; Rebs: Denis Krestinin 12; Asts: Denis Krestinin 3

Pasvalys Pieno žvaigždės Arena
Attendance: 1000
Referees: Gintaras Vitkauskas (LTU), Aare Halliko (EST), Martins Kozlovskis (LAT)

Baltic Basketball League 2017–18 Champions

Pieno žvaigždės
1st title

== Awards ==
=== MVP of the Month ===
Month	Player	Team	Ref.
November 2017	(United States) Steven Cook	(Estonia) University of Tartu	
December 2017	(Lithuania) Laurynas Birutis	(Lithuania) Šiauliai	
January 2018	(Estonia) Janar Talts	(Estonia) University of Tartu	
February 2018	(Latvia) Ivars Žvīgurs	(Latvia) Jūrmala	
March 2018	(Lithuania) Laurynas Birutis (2)	(Lithuania) Šiauliai	

Source: BBL Homepage

=== Finals MVP ===
- (Canada) Jahenns Manigat ( (Lithuania) Pieno žvaigždės)

== Player statistics ==
Players qualify to this category by having at least 50% games played.

=== Points ===
Rank	Name	Team	Games	Points	PPG
1	(Belarus) Yauheni Beliankou	(Belarus) Tsmoki-Minsk II	10	184	18.40
2	(Latvia) Jānis Kaufmanis	(Latvia) Valmiera ORDO	12	196	16.33
3	(United States) Nolan Cressler	(Estonia) AVIS Utilitas Rapla	12	194	16.17

=== Assists ===
Rank	Name	Team	Games	Assists	APG
1	(Lithuania) Donatas Sabeckis	(Lithuania) Šiauliai	16	110	6.88
2	(Estonia) Norman Käbin	(Estonia) TTÜ	12	69	5.75
3	(Latvia) Rinalds Sirsniņš	(Latvia) Ogre Kumho Tyre	14	75	5.36

=== Rebounds ===
Rank	Name	Team	Games	Rebounds	RPG
1	(Latvia) Viktors Iļjins	(Latvia) Valmiera ORDO	11	121	11.00
2	(Senegal) Bamba Fall	(Estonia) TLÜ Kalev	14	119	8.50
3	(United States) Devonte Upson	(Estonia) AVIS Utilitas Rapla	12	97	8.08

=== Efficiency ===
Rank	Name	Team	Games	Efficiency	PIR
1	(Lithuania) Laurynas Birutis	(Lithuania) Šiauliai	15	302	20.13
2	(Senegal) Bamba Fall	(Estonia) TLÜ Kalev	14	280	20.00
3	(Latvia) Viktors Iļjins	(Latvia) Valmiera ORDO	11	209	19.00
