= Gert Kullamäe =

Estonian basketball player and coach

BC Pärnu
- Title: Assistant coach
- League: Korvpalli Meistriliiga; Estonian-Latvian Basketball League; Europe Cup

Personal information
- Born: 3 June 1971 (age 55) Tallinn, then part of Estonian SSR, Soviet Union
- Listed height: 6 ft 5 in (1.96 m)
- Listed weight: 212 lb (96 kg)

Career information
- Playing career: 1985–2009
- Position: Shooting guard / small forward
- Number: 14
- Coaching career: 2009–present

Career history

Playing
- 1985–1989: TPI
- 1989–1990: TPEDI
- 1990–1993: Kalev
- 1993–1994: Žalgiris Kaunas
- 1994–1996: Kalev
- 1996–1997: Kamee
- 1998–2000: Kalev
- 2000–2001: Telindus Oostende
- 2001–2002: BC Hotronic
- 2002–2004: Brose Baskets
- 2004–2006: EiffelTowers
- 2006–2009: Tartu Ülikool

Coaching
- 2009–2012: Tartu Ülikool (assistant)
- 2012–2017: Tartu Ülikool
- 2018–2019: Tallinna Kalev/TLÜ
- 2019: TalTech
- 2020–2022: BC Pärnu (assistant)
- 2022–2024: BC Pärnu
- 2024–present: BC Pärnu (assistant)

Career highlights
- As player: 2× Estonian Basketball Player of the Year (1999, 2006); 2× KML Most Valuable Player (1998, 2000); 2× KML All-Star Five (1998, 2007); All-KML Second Team (2008); All-DBL Second Team (2006); 2× DBL All-Bosman Player of the Year (2005, 2006); DBL All-Star (2005); 7× Estonian League champion (1992, 1993, 1995, 1996, 1998, 2007, 2008); USSR League champion (1991); Lithuanian League champion (1994); Belgian champion (2001); Dutch champion (2006); Belgian Cup Winner (2001); As coach: KML Coach of the Year (2015); 2× Estonian League champion (2010, 2015); 5× Estonian Cup winner (2009–2011, 2013, 2014); Baltic League Cup Winner (2010)
Medals
Men's basketball
Representing Soviet Union
FIBA Europe U-16 Championship
Bronze medal – third place	1987 Hungary	U16 Team
Representing Estonia
Assistant Coach for Estonia
FIBA Europe U-18 Championship Division B
Bronze medal – third place	2017 Estonia	U18 Team

Gert Kullamäe (born 3 June 1971) is an Estonian basketball coach and a former professional basketball player who currently is the assistant coach of Estonian team BC Pärnu. Kullamäe mostly played at the shooting guard position and was a great 3-point shooter. As a player he is a seven-time Estonian Champion and also a Soviet Union, Lithuanian, Belgian and Dutch champion.

== Club career ==
Kullamäe was born in Tallinn, Estonia, and made his senior club debut with the TPI (Tallinn University of Technology) team in the Estonian SSR Championship (today Korvpalli Meistriliiga). This happened in the autumn of 1985 when he was only 14 years and 4 months old. After some seasons, he signed with Kalev and he played in USSR Championships; Korać Cup in 1990–91 and FIBA European Champions Cup in 1991–92. During this period Kullamäe won USSR Championship in 1991 and Estonian Championships in 1992 and 1993. Then he moved to Lithuanian BC Zalgiris and won the Lithuanian Championship in 1994. In Lithuania he was coached by Jaak Salumets, ex-coach of Tallinn "Kalev" and the Estonia national basketball team. After a successful season with the Lithuanian club Kullamäe came back to Estonia and played for Kalev and "Kamee" teams in Meistriliiga. He won the Estonian Championships again in 1995 and 1998. Eurobasket.com voted him a Meistriliiga MVP in 1998; 1999; 2000. Kullamäe signed a contract with Telindus Oostende in the 2000–01 season and won the Belgian League with the team. After a serious knee injury and one season in an Estonian team "BC Hotronic" he moved back to Europe. Kullamäe signed to a Bundesliga team Brose Baskets. With this team he won two German Championships silver medals and then moved to EiffelTowers. Kullamäe was voted Dutch Eredivisie All-Bosman Player of the Year in 2005 and 2006, he also won the Dutch Championship in 2006. In the summer of 2006 Kullamäe came back to Estonia and joined Tartu Ülikool/Rock. In 2007 and 2008 he won his 5th and 6th Estonian Championship title with the Tartu team. He also finished the Baltic Basketball League in third place in the 2008–09 season with Rock.

== Coaching ==
In July 2009 he announced his retirement from his active career and became an assistant coach in Tartu Rock. Kullamäe became head coach of Tartu in January 2012 after Indrek Visnapuu resigned. Kullamäe left Tartu after the team missed out of the 2017 Estonian League finals. In January 2018 he became the head coach of Tallinna Kalev/TLÜ. Kullamäe resigned in January 2019 due to a disagreement with the club management. In May 2019 he became the head coach of TalTech. He resigned in December 2019 and became the assistant coach of BC Pärnu Sadam in February 2020. In November 2022 he became the head coach of BC Pärnu Sadam.

== National team career ==
In the late 1980s, Kullamäe was a member of the U-17 USSR Basketball team (coached by Modestas Paulauskas) and the U-19 USSR Basketball team (coached by Stanislav Eremin). He won a bronze medal with the USSR team at the FIBA Europe Under-16 Championship in 1987. Kullamäe was a member of the Estonia national basketball team between 1993 and 1995, 1998 and 2001, and in 2004 and 2007 (when he served as captain). His national team career-high score was 32 points, which was obtained during a match against Lithuania in the autumn of 1994, as part of the EuroBasket 1995 qualifying round. Kullamäe was also a member of the Estonian EuroBasket 1993 squad.

== Season by season results as head coach ==
Abbreviations:
QF; quarter-finals.
T16; top sixteen.
L32; last 32.
RS; regular season.
QR2; qualification round 2.

League	Club	Season	Domestic Competitions		Regional Competitions		European Competitions	
League	Club	Season	Championship	Cup	Competition	Position	Competition	Position
Korvpalli Meistriliiga	Tartu Ülikool/Rock	2012–13	2nd	QF	Baltic Basketball League	QF	3 EuroChallenge	RS
Korvpalli Meistriliiga	Tartu Ülikool/Rock	2013–14	2nd	1st	Baltic Basketball League	3rd	3 EuroChallenge	QF
Korvpalli Meistriliiga	Tartu Ülikool/Rock	2014–15	1st	1st	Baltic Basketball League	4th	3 EuroChallenge	T16
Korvpalli Meistriliiga	Tartu Ülikool/Rock	2015–16	2nd	2nd	Baltic Basketball League	2nd	3 Europe Cup	L32
Korvpalli Meistriliiga	Tartu Ülikool/Rock	2016–17	3rd	2nd	Baltic Basketball League	3rd	3 Champions League	QR2
Korvpalli Meistriliiga	Tartu Ülikool/Rock	2016–17	3rd	2nd	Baltic Basketball League	3rd	4 Europe Cup	RS
Korvpalli Meistriliiga	Tallinna Kalev/TLÜ	2017–18	QF	No comp.	Baltic Basketball League	QF	Did not participate	
Korvpalli Meistriliiga	Tallinna Kalev/TLÜ	2018–19	(resigned)	No comp.	Latvian-Estonian Basketball League	(resigned)	Did not participate	
Korvpalli Meistriliiga	TalTech	2019–20	(resigned)	No comp.	Latvian-Estonian Basketball League	(resigned)	Did not participate	

== Honours ==
As a player

- 1990–91 Soviet Union League (Tallinna Kalev)
- 1991–92 Estonian League (Tallinna Kalev)
- 1992–93 Estonian League (Tallinna Kalev)
- 1993–94 Lithuanian League (Žalgiris Kaunas)
- 1994–95 Estonian League (BC Kalev)
- 1995–96 Estonian League (BC Kalev)
- 1997–98 Estonian League (BC Kalev)
- 2000–01 Belgian League (BC Oostende)
- 2000–01 Belgian Cup (Telindus Oostende)
- 2005–06 Dutch League (EiffelTowers)
- 2006–07 Estonian League (Tartu Ülikool/Rock)
- 2007–08 Estonian League (Tartu Ülikool/Rock)

As a coach

- 2009–10 Estonian Cup (Tartu Ülikool/Rock)
- 2009–10 Estonian League (Tartu Ülikool/Rock)
- 2010–11 Baltic League Cup (Tartu Ülikool/Rock)
- 2010–11 Estonian Cup (Tartu Ülikool/Rock)
- 2011–12 Estonian Cup (Tartu Ülikool)
- 2013–14 Estonian Cup (Tartu Ülikool/Rock)
- 2014–15 Estonian Cup (Tartu Ülikool/Rock)
- 2014–15 Estonian League (Tartu Ülikool/Rock)

=== Orders ===
Order of the White Star, 5th Class: 2010
