= 2015–16 Latvian Basketball League =

Aldaris LBL^{1}
- Season: 2015–16
- Teams: 10
- TV partner(s): LTV7

Finals
- Champions: Valmiera/ORDO (1st title)
- Runners-up: VEF Rīga
- Semifinalists: Ventspils; Liepāja/Triobet
- Finals MVP: (Latvia) Artūrs Bērziņš
- ^{1} Sponsored league name, referring to Aldaris.

The 2015–16 Latvian Basketball League was the 25th season of the top basketball league of Latvia. The regular season started at the end of September and will end on April 27, 2016. The Playoffs finished on May 31, 2016.

VEF Rīga was the defending champion. Valmiera/ORDO won its first national championship this season.

== Competition format ==
Eleven teams were expected to play in the league, as three of the teams (Jelgava, Saldus, and Valka/Valga) would confirm they meet the requirements yet. Finally, only Jelgava and Valka/Valga joined the league.

As Valka/Valga was finally admitted in the league, the club played both Latvian and Estonian leagues. For the LBL, Valka/Valga would play, as VEF Rīga, two legs in the regular season.

== Teams ==
Location of teams in 2015–16 Latvian Basketball League

Team	Home city	Arena
Barons/LDz	Mārupe	Mārupe Arena
Jēkabpils	Jēkabpils	Jēkabpils Sporta nams
Jelgava	Jelgava	Olympic Sports Center of Zemgale
Jūrmala/Fēnikss	Jūrmala	Taurenītis
Latvijas Universitāte	Rīga	OSC
Liepāja/Triobet	Liepāja	Liepāja Olympic Center
Ogre	Ogre	
Valka/Valga	Valga, Estonia	Valga Spordihoone
Valmiera	Valmiera	Vidzeme Olympic Center
VEF Rīga	Rīga	Arena Riga
Ventspils	Ventspils	Ventspils Olympic Center

== League table ==
Pos	Team	Pld	W	L	PF	PA	PD	PCT	Qualification
1	Valmiera/ORDO	36	30	6	2986	2609	+377	.833	Qualified for the semifinals
2	Ventspils	36	28	8	3181	2463	+718	.778	Qualified for the semifinals
3	VEF Rīga	20	15	5	1749	1436	+313	.750	Qualified for the quarterfinals
4	Liepāja/Triobet	36	24	12	2978	2696	+282	.667	Qualified for the quarterfinals
5	Jūrmala/Fēnikss	36	20	16	2936	2841	+95	.556	Qualified for the quarterfinals
6	Valka/Valga	20	11	9	1581	1697	−116	.550	Qualified for the quarterfinals
7	Jēkabpils	36	19	17	2796	2860	−64	.528	
8	Barons/LDz	36	12	24	2809	2996	−187	.333	
9	Jelgava	36	9	27	2524	3920	−1396	.250	
10	Ogre/Kumho Tyre	36	9	27	2644	3117	−473	.250	
11	Latvijas Universitāte	36	5	31	2493	3042	−549	.139	

Source: LBL

== Playoffs ==
Quarterfinals
4	Liepāja/Triobet	3
5	Jūrmala/Fēnikss	0
3	VEF Rīga	3
6	Valka/Valga	0

Semifinals
1	Valmiera/ORDO	3
4	Liepāja/Triobet	0
2	Ventspils	2
3	VEF Rīga	3

Finals
1	Valmiera/ORDO	4
3	VEF Rīga	3

Third place
2	Ventspils	3
4	Liepāja/Triobet	2

== Awards ==
=== Finals MVP ===
Player	Team	Ref.
(Latvia) Artūrs Bērziņš	Valmiera/ORDO	
