= 2016–17 Latvian Basketball League =

Olybet LBL^{1}
- Season: 2016–17
- Teams: 10
- TV partner(s): LTV7

Finals
- Champions: VEF Rīga
- Runners-up: Ventspils
- ^{1} Sponsored league name, referring to Olybet.

The 2016–17 Latvian Basketball League was the 26th season of the top basketball league of Latvia. The regular season started on 28 September 2016.

BK Valmiera was the defending champion, with VEF Rīga winning the league by defeating Ventspils in the finals by 4–0.

== Competition format ==
After Jelgava's withdrawal, ten teams will join the league. The two first qualified teams will join directly the semifinals while teams between third and sixth will qualify to the quarterfinals.

== Teams ==
Location of teams in 2015–16 Latvian Basketball League

Team	Home city	Arena
Barons/LDz	Mārupe	Mārupe Arena
Jēkabpils	Jēkabpils	Jēkabpils Sporta nams
Jūrmala/Fēnikss	Jūrmala	Taurenītis
Latvijas Universitāte	Rīga	OSC
Liepāja/Triobet	Liepāja	Liepāja Olympic Center
Ogre	Ogre	
Valka/Valga	Valga, Estonia	Valga Spordihoone
Valmiera	Valmiera	Vidzeme Olympic Center
VEF Rīga	Rīga	Arena Riga
Ventspils	Ventspils	Ventspils Olympic Center

== League table ==
Pos	Team	Pld	W	L	PF	PA	PD	PCT	Qualification
1	Ventspils	32	27	5	2887	2414	+473	.844	Qualified for the semifinals
2	VEF Rīga	18	14	4	1497	1308	+189	.778	Qualified for the semifinals
3	Valmiera/ORDO	32	21	11	2622	2500	+122	.656	Qualified for the quarterfinals
4	Jēkabpils	32	18	14	2495	2326	+169	.563	Qualified for the quarterfinals
5	Barons/LDz	32	17	15	2633	2551	+82	.531	Qualified for the quarterfinals
6	Liepāja/Triobet	32	15	17	2564	2606	−42	.469	Qualified for the quarterfinals
7	Jūrmala/Fēnikss	32	13	19	2411	2512	−101	.406	
8	Ogre/Kumho Tyre	32	13	19	2506	2661	−155	.406	
9	Valka/Valga	18	3	15	1351	1652	−301	.167	
10	Latvijas Universitāte	32	5	27	2210	2646	−436	.156	

Source: LBL

== Playoffs ==
Seeded teams played games 1, 3, 5 and 7 at home.

Quarter-finals
Jēkabpils	89	76	93	67	65
Barons/LDz	84	82	92	83	70
Valmiera/ORDO	101	80	100	74	102
Liepāja/Triobet	70	85	94	93	75

Semi-finals
Ventspils	108	87	100
Barons/LDz	66	69	68
VEF Rīga	71	87	85
Valmiera/ORDO	70	76	70

Final
Ventspils	66	76	82	69
VEF Rīga	76	84	90	78

Third place
Barons/LDz	63	90	79	83
Valmiera/ORDO	69	73	60	65
