= Haralds Kārlis =

Latvian basketball player

No. 13 – Jūrmala
- Position: Small forward / shooting guard
- League: Latvian League

Personal information
- Born: 29 April 1991 (age 35) Rīga, Latvia
- Listed height: 1.95 m (6 ft 5 in)
- Listed weight: 95 kg (209 lb)

Career information
- College: Seton Hall (2011–2015)
- NBA draft: 2015: undrafted
- Playing career: 2008–2018

Career history
- 2008–2009: Barons
- 2009–2011: Gran Canaria Academy
- 2015–2017: Valmiera
- 2017–2018: Jūrmala

Career highlights
- Estonia/Latvia League All Star (2018); Latvian League champion (2016)

Haralds Kārlis (born 29 April 1991) is a former Latvian professional basketball player who played for BK Jūrmala of the Latvian League.

== Professional career ==
After graduating from college, Kārlis signed his first professional contract with Latvian team BK Valmiera where he played 2 seasons. In 2015–16 season BK Valmiera got gold medals in Latvian basketball league by beating VEF Riga in the final.

On 3 October 2017, signed with BK Jūrmala for 2017–18 season. Haralds was named most valuable player in February.

In September 2018, Karlis announced the end of his professional basketball career due to injuries.

== International career ==
Haralds Kārlis was selected in Latvian national basketball team roster for the 2015 EuroBasket.
