= 2012–13 Baltic Basketball League =

- Season: 2012–13
- Duration: October 1, 2012 – April 6, 2013
- Games played: 174
- Teams: 23
- TV partner: Viasat Sport Baltic

Regular season
- Season MVP: (Lithuania) Gediminas Orelik

Finals
- Champions: (Latvia) Ventspils (1st title)
- Runners-up: (Lithuania) Prienai
- Third place: (Estonia) Kalev/Cramo
- Fourth place: (Latvia) Barons kvartāls
- Finals MVP: (Latvia) Jānis Timma

Statistical leaders
Points	(Latvia) Māris Gulbis	18.73
Rebounds	(United States) Tyler Cain	11.25
Assists	(Lithuania) Augustas Pečiukevičius	5.71
- All statistics correct as of September 17, 2014.

The 2012–13 Baltic Basketball League was the 9th season of the Baltic Basketball League.

The Challenge Cup tournament was discontinued and the new format featured 23 teams – 9 from Lithuania, 8 from Estonia, 5 from Latvia and 1 from Kazakhstan. For the Regular season the teams were divided into three groups of six and one group of five. Top four teams of each group advanced to Last 16 where they were divided into four groups. Two best teams of each group advanced to the play-offs. All play-off games were played in home-and-away series.

Ventspils became the first ever Latvian team to win the tournament by beating Lithuanian side Prienai 161–142 on aggregate score in the finals. Kalev/Cramo from Estonia won their first Baltic League medal by downing Latvian side Barons kvartāls 144–137 in the bronze medal playoffs.

== Teams ==
Key to colors
Champion	Runner-up	Third place	Fourth place	Quarterfinalist	Last 16	Regular season

Country (League)	Teams	Teams (rankings in 2011–12 national championships)								
Lithuania (LKL)	9	Prienai (3)	Šiauliai (4)	Pieno žvaigždės (5)	Nevėžis (7)	LSU/Baltai (8)	Juventus (9)	Sakalai (10)	Lietkabelis (11)	Palanga/Triobet (12)
Estonia (KML)	8	Kalev/Cramo (1)	Tartu Ülikool/Rock (2)	Rakvere Tarvas (3)	TYCO Rapla (4)	TTÜ KK (5)	Tallinna Kalev (6)	KK Pärnu (7)	Valga/Maks & Moorits (8)	
Latvia (LBL)	5	Ventspils (2)	Liepāja/Triobet (3)	Valmiera (5)	Jelgava (6)	Barons kvartāls (LBL2 1)				
Kazakhstan (D1)	1	Barsy Atyrau (2)								

== Regular season ==
Location of teams of the Regular season in 2012–13 Baltic Basketball League.
Location of teams of the Regular season in 2012–13 Baltic Basketball League.

The Regular season ran from October 1, 2012 to December 18, 2012.

If teams are level on record at the end of the Regular season, tiebreakers are applied in the following order:

1. Head-to-head record.
2. Head-to-head point differential.
3. Point differential during the Regular season.
4. Points scored during the Regular season.
5. Sum of quotients of points scored and points allowed in each Regular season match.

Key to colors
Top four places in each group advance to Last 16
Eliminated

=== Group A ===
	Team	Pld	W	L	PF	PA	Diff	Pts	Tie-break
1.	(Latvia) Ventspils	10	10	0	811	595	+216	20	
2.	(Lithuania) Šiauliai	10	8	2	881	660	+221	18	
3.	(Lithuania) Palanga/Triobet	10	5	5	673	790	–117	15	
4.	(Kazakhstan) Barsy Atyrau	10	4	6	763	795	–32	14	
5.	(Estonia) TTÜ KK	10	2	8	665	773	–108	12	
6.	(Estonia) TYCO Rapla	10	1	9	692	872	–180	11	

=== Group B ===
	Team	Pld	W	L	PF	PA	Diff	Pts	Tie-break
1.	(Estonia) Tartu Ülikool/Rock	10	9	1	919	696	+223	19	
2.	(Lithuania) Lietkabelis	10	8	2	811	727	+84	18	
3.	(Lithuania) Juventus	10	5	5	845	830	+15	15	
4.	(Latvia) Jelgava	10	4	6	791	864	–73	14	
5.	(Latvia) Liepāja/Triobet	10	2	8	695	790	–95	12	1–1 (+27)
6.	(Estonia) Valga/Maks & Moorits	10	2	8	666	820	–154	12	1–1 (–27)

=== Group C ===
	Team	Pld	W	L	PF	PA	Diff	Pts	Tie-break
1.	(Lithuania) Prienai	10	10	0	915	672	+243	20	
2.	(Estonia) Rakvere Tarvas	10	5	5	792	819	–27	15	3–1
3.	(Latvia) Barons kvartāls	10	5	5	759	814	–55	15	2–2
4.	(Lithuania) Sakalai	10	5	5	779	764	+15	15	1–3
5.	(Lithuania) Nevėžis	10	4	6	768	732	+36	14	
6.	(Estonia) Tallinna Kalev	10	1	9	664	876	–212	11	

=== Group D ===
	Team	Pld	W	L	PF	PA	Diff	Pts	Tie-break
1.	(Lithuania) Pieno žvaigždės	8	8	0	693	551	+142	16	
2.	(Estonia) Kalev/Cramo	8	6	2	616	556	+60	14	
3.	(Latvia) Valmiera	8	3	5	595	636	–41	11	
4.	(Estonia) KK Pärnu	8	2	6	573	630	–57	10	
5.	(Lithuania) LSU/Baltai	8	1	7	542	646	–104	9	

== Last 16 ==
The Last 16 phase ran from January 8, 2013 to February 26, 2013.

If teams are level on record at the end of the Last 16 phase, tiebreakers are applied in the following order:

1. Head-to-head record.
2. Head-to-head point differential.
3. Point differential during the Last 16 phase.
4. Points scored during the Last 16 phase.
5. Sum of quotients of points scored and points allowed in each Last 16 phase match.

Key to colors
Top two teams in each group advance to quarterfinals.
Eliminated

=== Group E ===
	Team	Pld	W	L	PF	PA	Diff	Pts	Tie-break
1.	(Latvia) Ventspils	6	5	1	480	386	+94	11	1–1 (+20)
2.	(Latvia) Barons kvartāls	6	5	1	443	436	+7	11	1–1 (–20)
3.	(Estonia) KK Pärnu	6	1	5	474	506	–32	7	1–1 (+21)
4.	(Lithuania) Lietkabelis	6	1	5	443	512	–69	7	1–1 (–21)

=== Group F ===
	Team	Pld	W	L	PF	PA	Diff	Pts	Tie-break
1.	(Estonia) Tartu Ülikool/Rock	6	4	2	485	410	+75	10	1–1 (0) (Note: Head-to-head record and head-to-head point differential were equal, therefore overall point differential in Last 16 phase was used to determine the group winner)
2.	(Lithuania) Šiauliai	6	4	2	500	469	+31	10	1–1 (0)
3.	(Latvia) Valmiera	6	3	3	416	419	–3	9	
4.	(Lithuania) Sakalai	6	1	5	380	483	–103	7	

=== Group G ===
	Team	Pld	W	L	PF	PA	Diff	Pts	Tie-break
1.	(Lithuania) Prienai	6	5	1	535	443	+92	11	1–1 (+9)
2.	(Estonia) Kalev/Cramo	6	5	1	495	421	+74	11	1–1 (–9)
3.	(Latvia) Jelgava	6	2	4	508	588	–80	8	
4.	(Lithuania) Palanga/Triobet	6	0	6	477	563	–86	6	

=== Group H ===
	Team	Pld	W	L	PF	PA	Diff	Pts	Tie-break
1.	(Lithuania) Pieno žvaigždės	6	4	2	509	451	+58	10	2–2 (+7)
2.	(Estonia) Rakvere Tarvas	6	4	2	533	489	+44	10	2–2 (+4)
3.	(Lithuania) Juventus	6	4	2	547	505	+42	10	2–2 (–11)
4.	(Kazakhstan) Barsy Atyrau	6	0	6	432	576	–144	6	

== Play-offs ==
In the knockout phase rounds will be played in a home-and-away format, with the overall cumulative score determining the winner of a round. Thus, the score of one single game can be tied.

=== Bracket ===
Quarterfinals; March 5, 2013 – March 12, 2013
E1	(Latvia) Ventspils	78	87	165
F2	(Lithuania) Šiauliai	81	80	161
G2	(Estonia) Kalev/Cramo	71	79	150
H1	(Lithuania) Pieno žvaigždės	54	82	136
E2	(Latvia) Barons kvartāls	63	89	152
F1	(Estonia) Tartu Ülikool/Rock	49	100	149
G1	(Lithuania) Prienai	108	110	218
H2	(Estonia) Rakvere Tarvas	72	89	161

Semifinals; March 18, 2013 - March 22, 2013
E1	(Latvia) Ventspils	61	78	139
G2	(Estonia) Kalev/Cramo	64	65	129
E2	(Latvia) Barons kvartāls	73	80	153
G1	(Lithuania) Prienai	76	110	186

Finals; April 2, 2013 – April 6, 2013
E1	(Latvia) Ventspils	91	70	161
G1	(Lithuania) Prienai	69	73	142
Third place
E2	(Latvia) Barons kvartāls	79	58	137
G2	(Estonia) Kalev/Cramo	71	73	144

=== Finals ===
Team #1	Agg.	Team #2	1st leg	2nd leg
Ventspils (Latvia)	161–142	(Lithuania) Prienai	91–69	70–73

Game 1

2 April 2013

Boxscore

Prienai (Lithuania)	69–91	(Latvia) Ventspils
Scoring by quarter: 17–23, 20–29, 17–15, 15–24
Pts: Orelik 15; Rebs: Urbutis 4 Asts: Kadžiulis 4		Pts: Campbell 23; Rebs: Campbell 8 Asts: Campbell 5

Prienai Arena, Prienai

Game 2

6 April 2013

Boxscore

Ventspils (Latvia)	70–73	(Lithuania) Prienai
Pts: Timma 15; Rebs: Sims 5 Asts: Campbell 5		Pts: Vene, Kadžiulis 15; Rebs: Valeika 9 Asts: Three players, 3

Ventspils Olympic Center, Ventspils

Baltic Basketball League 2013 Champions

Ventspils
1st title

== Individual statistics ==
Players qualify to this category by having at least 50% games played. Statistics include only Regular Season games.
Source: Baltic Basketball League player statistics

=== Efficiency ===
Rank	Name	Team	Games	Efficiency	EFF
1.	(Estonia) Rain Raadik	(Estonia) KK Pärnu	14	307	21.93
2.	(Lithuania) Gediminas Orelik	(Lithuania) Prienai	16	333	20.81
3.	(United States) Tyler Cain	(Latvia) Barons kvartāls	8	165	20.63
4.	(United States) Emmanuel Okoye	(Estonia) Tallinna Kalev	10	206	20.60
5.	(Latvia) Jānis Bērziņš	(Latvia) Valmiera	14	280	20.00

=== Points ===
Rank	Name	Team	Games	Points	PPG
1.	(Latvia) Māris Gulbis	(Latvia) Barons kvartāls	15	281	18.73
2.	(Estonia) Reimo Tamm	(Estonia) Rakvere Tarvas	16	279	17.44
3.	(Estonia) Rain Raadik	(Estonia) KK Pärnu	14	244	17.43
4.	(United States) Emmanuel Okoye	(Estonia) Tallinna Kalev	10	174	17.40
5.	(Lithuania) Gediminas Orelik	(Lithuania) Prienai	16	276	17.25

=== Rebounds ===
Rank	Name	Team	Games	Rebounds	RPG
1.	(United States) Tyler Cain	(Latvia) Barons kvartāls	8	90	11.25
2.	(Estonia) Rain Raadik	(Estonia) KK Pärnu	14	151	10.79
3.	(United States) Emmanuel Okoye	(Estonia) Tallinna Kalev	10	100	10.00
4.	(United States Virgin Islands) Frank Elegar	(Estonia) Kalev/Cramo	10	98	9.80
5.	(Latvia) Jānis Bērziņš	(Latvia) Valmiera	14	110	7.86

=== Assists ===
Rank	Name	Team	Games	Assists	APG
1.	(Lithuania) Augustas Pečiukevičius	(Estonia) KK Pärnu	14	80	5.71
2.	(Lithuania) Žygimantas Janavičius	(Lithuania) Prienai	9	51	5.67
3.	(United States) Marc Campbell	(Estonia) Tallinna Kalev	10	50	5.00
4.	(Lithuania) Mindaugas Stasys	(Lithuania) LSU/Baltai	7	32	4.57
5.	(Lithuania) Jokūbas Gintvainis	(Lithuania) Sakalai	16	72	4.50

== Awards ==
=== BBL 2012–13 Season MVP ===
- (Lithuania) Gediminas Orelik (Prienai)

=== BBL 2013 Finals MVP ===
- (Latvia) Jānis Timma (Ventspils)

=== Top Scorer ===
- (Latvia) Māris Gulbis (Barons kvartāls)

=== MVP of the Month ===
Month	Player	Team	Ref.
October 2012	(United States) Darrick Leonard	(Lithuania) Juventus	
November 2012	(Estonia) Reimo Tamm	(Estonia) Rakvere Tarvas	
December 2012	(Latvia) Māris Gulbis	(Latvia) Barons kvartāls	
January 2013	(Latvia) Jānis Bērziņš	(Latvia) Valmiera	
February 2013	(United States) Brandis Raley-Ross	(Estonia) Rakvere Tarvas	

Last updated: March 5, 2013.
Source: BBL Homepage
