= BK Valmiera =

Latvian basketball club

Valmiera Ordo
- Leagues: LBL; Baltic League
- Founded: 2001
- Dissolved: 2018
- History: Valmiera/Rujiena (2001–2003); Valmieras Piens (2004–2005); Lacplesa Alus (2006); SK Valmiera (2007–2010); BK Valmiera (2011–2015); Valmiera/Ordo (2016–2018)
- Arena: Vidzeme Olympic Center
- Capacity: 1500
- Location: Valmiera, Latvia
- Team colors: Green, White
- President: Ivars Rudzītis
- Team manager: Mārtiņš Bērziņš
- Championships: 1 Latvian league
- Website: bkvalmiera.lv
Home	Away

Former logo of BK Valmiera

BK Valmiera, named Valmiera Ordo for sponsorship reasons, was a professional basketball club based in Valmiera, Latvia which played in the Latvian Basketball League and Baltic Basketball League. Since 2018 the club is on hiatus. In the 2015-2016 season finals, Valmiera Ordo won its first and only national championship, beating VEF Rīga in a seven-game series. Valmiera is a three-time LBL bronze medal winner, attaining the distinction in 2003, 2005, and 2013, with coach Varis Krūmiņš.

Valmiera is one of the main basketball centers in Latvia, providing talent for Latvian national teams, such as Dairis Bertāns, Dāvis Bertāns, Rolands Šmits, and Jānis Bērziņš.

== History ==
The club was founded in 2001, but in the period prior there was a Valmiera team known as SK Valmiera, which is considered a precursor of this team. Also, the team has also been known by the names Valmiera-Rūjiena, Valmieras Piens, and Valmiera/Lāčplēša. The current Valmiera team is a three-time Latvian Basketball League bronze medal winner.

=== 2015–16 season: Latvian league championship ===
Before the start of the season, BK Valmiera included the sponsor's name in the team's name, becoming Valmiera/Ordo. Head coach Ainars Zvirgzdins returned after a three-year absence. Hometown favorite Jānis Kaufmanis returned to the squad after a year in Spain. The biggest additions were Artūrs Bērziņš, sharpshooter Mārtiņš Laksa, and 2015 EuroBasket participant Haralds Kārlis.

The Latvian Basketball League season began on 30 September with Valmiera/Ordo beating reigning champions VEF Rīga on the road 79–75. Valmiera kept the winning streak alive for seven games before losing their first game, against BK Ventspils on 7 November by a score of 74–82 in an away game. Before that, on 21 October, the team took a chance on picking up veteran guard Armands Šķēle, giving him the opportunity to play professional basketball for the first time together with his younger brother Aigars Šķēle. Despite being at the top of the league in November and December, the team struggled. Lithuanian point guard Vytenis Čižauskas left the team because of limited minutes given by the coach. For the next couple of weeks, Gatis Melderis took command of the coaching position. The situation was difficult due to injuries. On 26 December, in Liepāja, Valmiera/Ordo could field only an eight-player roster, but in the 44th game, the second team captain Haralds Kārlis injured his ACL, which took him out of basketball activities for a full year. Valmiera/Ordo lost that game 87–91.

After New Year's came, more changes were made with the team. In the center position, Valmiera/Ordo added Lauris Blaus. On 15 January, Roberts Štelmahers became the third head coach of the team in the same season. Štelmahers' debut came a day later, against his former team BK Ventspils. In their home court, Valmiera/Ordo celebrated an 87-83 victory. In the next months, Valmiera added victories in the tournament table and incorporated veteran forward Akselis Vairogs and point guard Kwamain Mitchell into the team's roster.

In March, the Baltic Basketball League deciding games took place. During the regular season, Valmiera/Ordo finished with a record of 9–3 and second place in group A. At the playoffs stage, Valmiera defeated Estonian BC Tallinna Kalev (171–134) and Lithuanian BC Pieno žvaigždės (161–149). Before the semi-finals, the team's goal was to win a medal in the Baltic league competition for the first time in club's history but it did not come to pass. In the semi-finals, Valmiera was forced to admit University of Tartu's superiority (132–143). In the bronze series against BC Lietkabelis Valmiera could not hold on to the first-game 16 point lead, suffering a defeat in a two-game summary of 154–160.

Meanwhile in the Latvian league, Valmiera/Ordo finished the regular season with a 13 game winning streak, beating its main rivals in the top of the tournament's table. Finishing regular season with 30–6, Valmiera took the top spot on end table and first seed in the playoffs. In the semifinals, Valmiera/Ordo rolled over Liepāja/Triobet winning the series 3–0. Valmiera's opponent in the championship finals was the four-time champions and reigning Latvian trophy holders VEF Rīga. The finals began on 21 March. Valmiera/Ordo lost the first game at home with a score of 59–70, but in the second match Valmiera took the victory 73–71. On the road Valmiera went with a draw 1–1. In the Arēna Rīga, Valmiera took Game 3 with a score of 79–70, but in Game 4 VEF Rīga aligned series result 2–2 (with a score of 77–82). The fifth game, in 27 March came back to Valmiera. The visitors managed to pull away the victory, putting themselves one victory away from the title (76–85). But Valmiera/Ordo was not ready to surrender. In Game-6 Valmiera/Ordo took away the victory 82–77. In the final game on March 31, Valmiera/Ordo pleased the crowd at a sold-out home game by securing the victory 79–70. Taking the series with a win of 4–3 Valmiera/Ordo celebrated its first National title in Valmiera city sports history.

LBL finals MVP award winner was Artūrs Bērziņš (season stats: 9.8 ppg, 4,1 rpg). Between team leaders was Aigars Šķēle (10.5 ppg, 4.0 asp), Mārtiņš Laksa (10.3 ppg, 4.3 rpg), Armands Šķēle (9.5 ppg, 4.0 rpg) and Jānis Kaufmanis (9.4 ppg).

=== Valmiera/Ordo championships depth chart ===
Pos.	Starting 5	Bench 1	Reserve
C	Lauris Blaus	Dāvis Rozītis	Viktors Iļjins
PF	Artūrs Bērziņš	Ervīns Jonāts
SF	Mārtiņš Laksa	Mārtiņš Vīņauds	Haralds Kārlis
SG	Armands Šķēle	Jānis Kaufmanis
PG	Kwamain Mitchell	Aigars Šķēle	Raimonds Gabrāns

=== After the championship ===
After winning the Latvian championship, Valmiera/Ordo declined the option to play in the Basketball Champions League. Led by head coach Uvis Helmanis the team's squad was still solid. The team's top scorers were Janis Kaufmanis, Mārtiņš Laksa and Artūrs Bērziņš. At the end of the season, one of the EuroLeague stars, D'or Fischer, was added to the team's roster. But things did not go Valmiera's way. In the 2016–17 Baltic Basketball League Valmiera/Ordo lost in the quarterfinals, while in the 2016–17 Latvian Basketball League the team lost in the bronze medal series. The team struggled financially during the last months of the season, which affected it in the upcoming season.

In the 2017–18 Latvian Basketball League the team finished in last position. The new head coach Kristaps Valters had only three proven players—Janis Kaufmanis, Viktors Iļjins and Edmunds Elksnis. The rest of the team was very young and the team lost most of its games, taking last position in the national championship and not making the 2017–18 Baltic Basketball League playoff tournament.

After the season, the club announced it would skip the 2019–2020 season and withdraw from all Latvian leagues for a year due to financial issues, saying that they would announce their next moves in July. The city of Valmiera is currently represented in Latvian basketball by the unrelated team BK Valmiera Glass/ViA.

== Roster ==
=== Retired numbers ===
BK Valmiera retired numbers
No.	Player	Position	Tenure	Ceremony date
8	(Latvia) Dainis Bertāns	C	1992–2004	08/01/2014

=== Current roster ===
Valmiera Ordo roster
Players
Coaches

Pos.	No.	Nat.	Name	Ht.	Wt.	Age
G	3	(Latvia)	Elksnis, Edmunds	1.87 m (6 ft 2 in)	90 kg (198 lb)	34 – 19 November 1990
SG	5	(Latvia)	Kaufmanis, Jānis	1.86 m (6 ft 1 in)	88 kg (194 lb)	35 – 3 October 1989
PF	10	(Latvia)	Miška, Anrijs	2.05 m (6 ft 9 in)	91 kg (201 lb)	25 – 14 January 2000
SG	13	(Latvia)	Vīksne, Dāvids	1.94 m (6 ft 4 in)	81 kg (179 lb)	24 – 7 November 2000
C	17	(Latvia)	Iļjins, Viktors	2.15 m (7 ft 1 in)	116 kg (256 lb)	33 – 17 July 1991
C	22	(Latvia)	Adiņš, Rihards	2.04 m (6 ft 8 in)	106 kg (234 lb)	30 – 9 April 1994
SG	25	(Latvia)	Hāzners, Eduards	1.94 m (6 ft 4 in)	88 kg (194 lb)	27 – 28 December 1997
G	27	(Latvia)	Bērziņš, Ojārs	1.91 m (6 ft 3 in)	84 kg (185 lb)	24 – 26 January 2001

Head coach

- (Latvia) Kristaps Valters

Assistant coach(es)

- (Latvia) Gatis Melderis

Legend

- (C) Team captain
- Injured

- Roster
Updated: April 1, 2017

== Season by season ==
Season	Latvian League	Pos.	Baltic League		European competitions		
2000–01	LBL	7th					
2001–02	LBL	6th					
2002–03	LBL	3rd					
2003–04	LBL	4th			4 FIBA Europe Cup	CSF	6–5
2004–05	LBL	3rd	Elite Division	8th			
2005–06	LBL	5th	Elite Division	7th			
2006–07	LBL	5th	Elite Division	7th			
2007–08	LBL	5th	Elite Division	9th			
2008–09	LBL	5th	Elite Division	9th			
2009–10	LBL	4th	Elite Division	8th			
2010–11	LBL	5th	Elite Division	14th			
2011–12	LBL	5th	Challenge Cup	5th			
2012–13	LBL	3rd	Last 16				
2013–14	LBL	6th	Round of 16				
2014–15	LBL	7th	Round of 16				
2015–16	LBL	1st	Fourth place				
2016–17	LBL	4th	Quarterfinals				
2017–18	LBL	9th	Group Stage	9th			

== Notable players ==
- (Latvia) Dairis Bertāns
- (Latvia) Artūrs Bērziņš
- (Latvia) Jānis Bērziņš
- (Latvia) Kaspars Cipruss
- (Latvia) Edmunds Elksnis
- (Latvia) Ernests Kalve
- (Latvia) Jānis Kaufmanis
- (Latvia) Rinalds Sirsniņš
- (Latvia) Akselis Vairogs
- (Latvia) Pāvels Veselovs
- (Latvia) Māris Ziediņš
- (United States) (Israel) D'Or Fischer
- (United States) Rashad Phillips
- (Lithuania) Artūras Valeika
- (Serbia) Vladimir Štimac
- (Slovenia) Blaž Črešnar

== Notable coaches ==
- (Latvia) Ainars Bagatskis
- (Latvia) Roberts Štelmahers
- (Latvia) Ainars Zvirgzdiņš
