= 2011–12 Latvian Basketball League =

Latvian Basketball League 2011–12
- League: Latvijas Basketbola Līga
- Sport: Basketball
- Duration: 8 October 2011 – 31 March 2012

Regular season

LBL seasons
- ← 2010–11 2012–13 →

The Latvijas Basketbola līga 2011–2012 (LBL) is the twenty-first season. The regular season starts in October 2011.

== Participants ==
- VEF Rīga
- BK Ventspils
- Liepājas Lauvas
- BK Valmiera
- BA Turība
- LU/Latvijas Universitāte
- BK Jelgava
- Jūrmala
- Latvia U18

== Regular season ==
	Team	Pld	W	L	PF	PA	Pct	Qualification
1	VEF Rīga	16	15	1	1518	1120	93	Qualified for the semifinals
2	BK Ventspils	16	15	1	1469	1073	93	Qualified for the semifinals
3	Liepājas Lauvas	26	17	9	2234	1939	65	Qualified for the quarterfinals
4	BK Valmiera	26	13	13	2080	1978	50	Qualified for the quarterfinals
5	LU/Latvijas Universitāte	26	12	14	2114	2186	46	Qualified for the quarterfinals
6	BK Jelgava	26	11	15	2110	2169	42	Qualified for the quarterfinals
7	BA Turība	26	9	17	1948	2206	34	
8	Jūrmala	26	9	17	1801	2044	34	
9	Latvia U18	16	1	15	877	1436	6	

== Playoffs ==
Quarterfinals
4	Valmiera	1
5	LU/Latvijas Universitāte	2
3	Liepājas Lauvas	2
6	BK Jelgava	0

Semifinals
1	VEF Rīga	3
5	LU/Latvijas Universitāte	0
2	BK Ventspils	3
3	Liepājas Lauvas	1

Finals
1	VEF Rīga	4
2	BK Ventspils	1
Third place
3	Liepājas Lauvas	3
5	LU/Latvijas Universitāte	0

== Awards ==
=== Players of the month ===
Month	Player	Team	Ref.
October	Ernests Kalve (1/2)	BK Valmiera	
November	Ernests Kalve (2/2)	BK Valmiera	
December	Edgars Krūmiņš (1/1)	BK Jelgava	
January	Žanis Peiners (1/1)	LU/Latvijas Universitāte	

== See also ==
- VTB United League 2011–12
- Baltic Basketball League 2011–12
