= 2013–14 Baltic Basketball League =

Baseball League

- Season: 2013–14
- Duration: October 6, 2013 – April 13, 2014
- Games played: 157
- Teams: 21
- TV partner(s): Viasat Sport Baltic

Regular season
- Top seed: Pieno žvaigždės
- Season MVP: (United States) Travis Leslie

Finals
- Champions: (Lithuania) Šiauliai (1st title)
- Runners-up: (Lithuania) TonyBet
- Third place: (Estonia) Tartu Ülikool/Rock
- Fourth place: (Finland) Tampereen Pyrintö
- Finals MVP: (United States) Travis Leslie

Statistical leaders
Points	(Latvia) Jānis Kaufmanis	19.50
Rebounds	(Sweden) Joakim Kjellbom	9.69
Assists	(Latvia) Rinalds Sirsniņš	4.83
- All statistics correct as of September 17, 2014.

The 2013–14 Baltic Basketball League was the 10th anniversary season of the Baltic Basketball League.

This time the format featured 21 teams – 6 from Lithuania, 6 from Estonia, 5 from Latvia, 2 from Kazakhstan and 1 from Sweden and Finland. For the regular season the teams were divided into three groups of seven teams and competed in a round-robin competition system, with each team facing their opponent twice. Top five teams of each group and the best sixth placed team qualified for the eight-finals. All play-off games were played in home-and-away series.

The Finals were a Lithuanian clash as Šiauliai took the 2014 title by beating TonyBet 140–123 on aggregate score. Estonian team Tartu Ülikool/Rock won their second Baltic League bronze by beating Tampereen Pyrintö of Finland with aggregate score of 149–127.

== Teams ==
Key to colors
Champion	Runner-up	Third place	Fourth place	Quarterfinalist	Eightfinalist	Regular season

Country (League)	Teams	Teams (rankings in 2012–13 national championships)					
Lithuania (LKL)	6	TonyBet (4)	Pieno žvaigždės (5)	Šiauliai (6)	Juventus (7)	Nevėžis (8)	Lietkabelis (9)
Estonia (KML)	6	TÜ/Rock (2)	Rakvere Tarvas (3)	TYCO Rapla (4)	Pärnu (6)	Valga/Maks & Moorits (7)	Tallinna Kalev (8)
Latvia (LBL)	5	Ventspils (2)	Valmiera (3)	Barons kvartāls (4)	Jēkabpils (5)	Liepāja/Triobet (9)	
Kazakhstan (D1)	2	Barsy Atyrau (2)	Caspiy Aktau (3)				
Sweden (Ligan)	1	Norrköping Dolphins (4)					
Finland (Korisliiga)	1	Tampereen Pyrintö (4)					

== Regular season ==
Location of teams of the Regular season in 2013–14 Baltic Basketball League.
Red: Group A; Green: Group B; Blue: Group C;
Location of teams of the Regular season in 2013–14 Baltic Basketball League.

If teams are level on record at the end of the Regular season, tiebreakers are applied in the following order:

1. Points.
2. Points counting the games between tied teams only.
3. Point difference between tied teams.
4. League-wide point difference.

The criteria for determination of the best team placed 6th:
– Total number of points in each group.
– Total point average in each group

Key to colors
Top five places in each group and the best sixth placed team advance to eightfinals
Eliminated

=== Group A ===
	Team	Pld	W	L	PF	PA	Diff	Pts	Tie-break
1.	(Finland) Tampereen Pyrintö	12	10	2	1070	815	+255	22	
2.	(Sweden) Norrköping Dolphins	12	9	3	949	798	+151	21	
3.	(Latvia) Jēkabpils	12	7	5	956	856	+100	19	
4.	(Latvia) Valmiera	12	6	6	862	907	–45	18	
5.	(Estonia) Rakvere Tarvas	12	4	8	879	1031	–152	16	
6.	(Estonia) TYCO Rapla	12	3	9	779	958	–179	15	1–1 (+4)
7.	(Estonia) Tallinna Kalev	12	3	9	840	970	–130	15	1–1 (–4)

=== Group B ===
	Team	Pld	W	L	PF	PA	Diff	Pts	Tie-break
1.	(Latvia) Ventspils	12	10	2	919	748	+171	22	
2.	(Lithuania) Šiauliai	12	9	3	1002	917	+85	21	1–1 (+3)
3.	(Lithuania) Nevėžis	12	9	3	976	851	+125	21	1–1 (–3)
4.	(Kazakhstan) Barsy Atyrau	12	5	7	870	920	–50	17	
5.	(Lithuania) Lietkabelis	12	4	8	884	906	–22	16	2–0
6.	(Latvia) Liepāja/Triobet	12	4	8	853	923	–70	16	0–2
7.	(Estonia) Pärnu	12	1	11	774	1013	–239	13	

=== Group C ===
	Team	Pld	W	L	PF	PA	Diff	Pts	Tie-break
1.	(Lithuania) Pieno žvaigždės	12	11	1	976	756	+220	23	
2.	(Lithuania) TonyBet	12	10	2	1024	825	+199	22	
3.	(Estonia) TÜ/Rock	12	8	4	959	813	+146	20	
4.	(Latvia) Barons kvartāls	12	5	7	885	968	–83	17	2–0
5.	(Lithuania) Juventus	12	5	7	910	878	+32	17	0–2
6.	(Kazakhstan) Kaspiy Aktau	12	3	9	744	997	–253	15	
7.	(Estonia) Valga/Maks & Moorits	12	0	12	688	949	–261	12	

== Play-offs ==
In the knockout phase rounds will be played in a home-and-away format, with the overall cumulative score determining the winner of a round. Thus, the score of one single game can be tied.

All qualified teams for the BBL Eighth-finals will be classified from 1st place to 16th place according to their win–loss records:

1. Place in the group.
2. Points.
3. Points average.

=== Bracket ===
Eightfinals; February 20, 2014 – March 3, 2014
1	(Lithuania) Pieno žvaigždės	92	93	185
16	(Latvia) Liepāja/Triobet	79	67	146
8	(Estonia) TÜ/Rock	84	84	168
9	(Latvia) Jēkabpils	53	63	116
4	(Lithuania) TonyBet	67	84	151
13	(Lithuania) Juventus	70	76	146
5	(Sweden) Norrköping Dolphins	87	84	171
12	(Latvia) Barons kvartāls	75	71	146
3	(Latvia) Ventspils	66	84	150
14	(Lithuania) Lietkabelis	67	55	122
6	(Lithuania) Šiauliai	107	91	198
11	(Kazakhstan) Barsy Atyrau	79	78	157
2	(Finland) Tampereen Pyrintö	99	102	201
15	(Estonia) Rakvere Tarvas	80	94	174
7	(Lithuania) Nevėžis	70	96	166
10	(Latvia) Valmiera	89	70	159

Quarterfinals; March 7, 2014 – March 21, 2014
1	(Lithuania) Pieno žvaigždės	64	50	114
8	(Estonia) TÜ/Rock	77	52	129
4	(Lithuania) TonyBet	83	69	152
5	(Sweden) Norrköping Dolphins	69	59	128
3	(Latvia) Ventspils	60	71	131
6	(Lithuania) Šiauliai	66	68	134
2	(Finland) Tampereen Pyrintö	91	97	188
7	(Lithuania) Nevėžis	61	95	156

Semifinals; March 24, 2014 – April 8, 2014
8	(Estonia) TÜ/Rock	66	71	137
4	(Lithuania) TonyBet	68	82	150
6	(Lithuania) Šiauliai	82	85	167
2	(Finland) Tampereen Pyrintö	81	75	156

Finals; April 10, 2014 – April 12, 2014
4	(Lithuania) TonyBet	57	66	123
6	(Lithuania) Šiauliai	62	78	140

Bronze medal playoff

Team #1	Agg.	Team #2	1st leg	2nd leg
Tartu Ülikool/Rock (Estonia)	149–127	(Finland) Tampereen Pyrintö	75–62	74–65

=== Finals ===
Team #1	Agg.	Team #2	1st leg	2nd leg
Šiauliai (Lithuania)	140–123	(Lithuania) TonyBet	62–57	78–66

Game 1

10 April 2014
18:00

Boxscore

Šiauliai (Lithuania)	62–57	(Lithuania) TonyBet
Scoring by quarter: 19–12, 11–11, 14–17, 18–17
Pts: Leslie 16; Rebs: Leslie 7 Asts: Leslie 3		Pts: Lukauskis 18; Rebs: Šikšnius 7 Asts: Lukauskis 4

Šiauliai Arena, Šiauliai
Attendance: 1,490
Referees: Oskars Lucis (LAT), Arnis Ozols (LAT), Juris Kokainis (LAT)

Game 2

12 April 2014
17:00

Boxscore

TonyBet (Lithuania)	66–78	(Lithuania) Šiauliai
Scoring by quarter: 17–18, 19–21, 16–20, 14–19
Pts: Lukauskis 15; Rebs: Linkevičius 8 Asts: Janavičius 4		Pts: Giedraitis 17; Rebs: Leslie 10; Asts: Needham 6

Prienai Arena, Prienai
Attendance: 1,000
Referees: Olegs Latisevs (LAT), Arnis Ozols (LAT), Juris Kokainis (LAT)

Baltic Basketball League 2014 Champions

Šiauliai
1st title

== Individual statistics ==
Players qualify to this category by having at least 50% games played. Statistics include only Regular Season games.
Source: Baltic Basketball League player statistics

=== Efficiency ===
Rank	Name	Team	Games	Efficiency	EFF
1.	(Sweden) Joakim Kjellbom	(Sweden) Norrköping Dolphins	16	377	23.56
2.	(United States) Travis Leslie	(Lithuania) Šiauliai	12	241	20.08
3.	(Estonia) Rait Keerles	(Estonia) Rakvere Tarvas	11	208	18.91
4.	(United States) Troy Barnies	(Latvia) Jēkabpils	14	247	17.64
5.	(United States) William Walker	(Sweden) Norrköping Dolphins	13	227	17.46

=== Points ===
Rank	Name	Team	Games	Points	PPG
1.	(Latvia) Jānis Kaufmanis	(Latvia) Valmiera	14	273	19.50
2.	(United States) Troy Barnies	(Latvia) Jēkabpils	14	244	17.43
3.	(Estonia) Rait Keerles	(Estonia) Rakvere Tarvas	11	190	17.27
4.	(United States) Paul Hill	(Latvia) Liepāja/Triobet	7	113	16.14
5.	(Lithuania) Gintaras Leonavičius	(Lithuania) Nevėžis	15	240	16.00

=== Rebounds ===
Rank	Name	Team	Games	Rebounds	RPG
1.	(Sweden) Joakim Kjellbom	(Sweden) Norrköping Dolphins	16	155	9.69
2.	(Estonia) Rait Keerles	(Estonia) Rakvere Tarvas	11	98	8.91
3.	(Nigeria) Dinma Odiakosa	(Lithuania) Lietkabelis	7	59	8.43
4.	(United States) Travis Leslie	(Lithuania) Šiauliai	12	90	7.50
5.	(United States) Damon Williams	(Finland) Tampereen Pyrintö	20	148	7.40

=== Assists ===
Rank	Name	Team	Games	Assists	APG
1.	(Latvia) Rinalds Sirsniņš	(Latvia) Jēkabpils	12	58	4.83
2.	(Serbia) Edi Sinadinović	(Estonia) Valga/Maks & Moorits	6	27	4.50
3.	(Latvia) Raimonds Gabrāns	(Latvia) Valmiera	12	53	4.42
4.	(Lithuania) Rolandas Alijevas	(Lithuania) Pieno žvaigždės	15	66	4.40
5.	(United States) Lorenzo Williams	(Latvia) Ventspils	16	70	4.38

== Awards ==
=== BBL 2013–14 Season MVP ===
- (United States) Travis Leslie (Šiauliai)

=== BBL 2014 Finals MVP ===
- (United States) Travis Leslie (Šiauliai)

=== Top scorer ===
- (Latvia) Jānis Kaufmanis (Valmiera)

=== MVP of the Month ===
Month	Player	Team	Ref.
October 2013	(Lithuania) Gintaras Leonavičius	(Lithuania) Nevėžis	
November 2013	(Latvia) Jānis Timma	(Latvia) Ventspils	
December 2013	(Sweden) Joakim Kjellbom	(Sweden) Norrköping Dolphins	
January 2014	(United States) Troy Barnies	(Latvia) Jēkabpils	
February 2014	(Lithuania) Tauras Jogėla	(Lithuania) Nevėžis	

Last updated: September 16, 2014.
Source: BBL Homepage
