= Akselis Vairogs =

Latvian basketball player

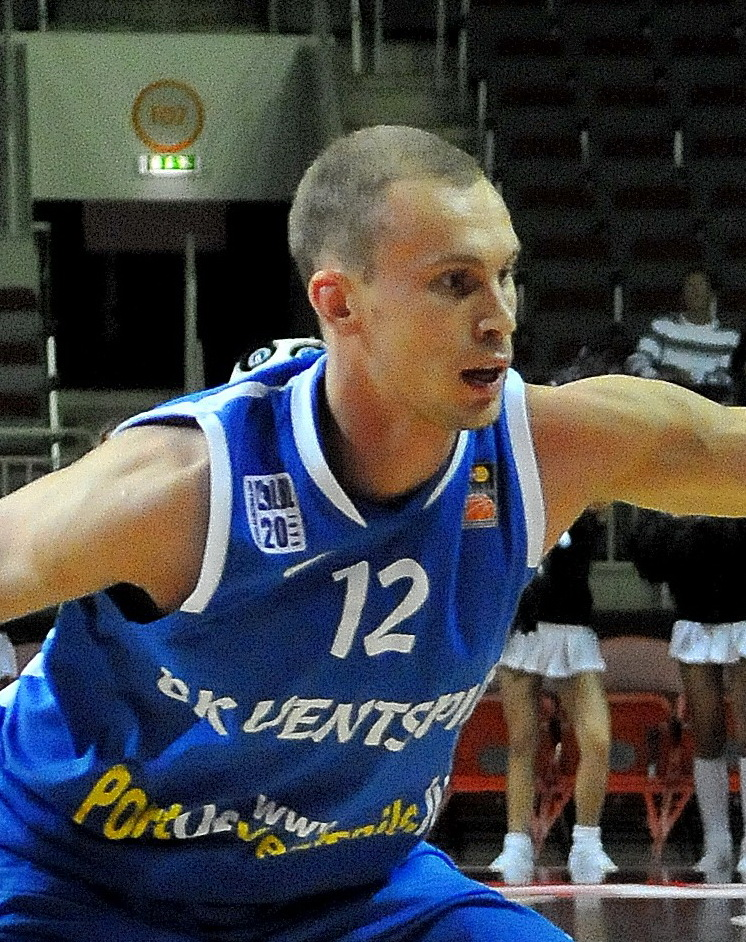

Rīgas Zeļļi
- Title: Assistant coach
- League: LEBL

Personal information
- Born: 8 November 1985 (age 41) Riga, Latvia
- Listed height: 1.95 m (6 ft 5 in)
- Listed weight: 91 kg (201 lb)

Career information
- Playing career: 2002–2017
- Position: Shooting guard
- Number: 33
- Coaching career: 2017–present

Career history

Playing
- 2002–2005: Ventspils Augstskola
- 2005–2006: BK Valmiera
- 2006–2009: Ventspils
- 2009: BK Zemgale
- 2009–2010: Bordeaux
- 2010–2011: Ventspils
- 2011–2012: Śląsk Wrocław
- 2012–2015: Ventspils
- 2015–2016: Lietkabelis Panevėžys
- 2016–2017: Valmiera/ORDO

Coaching
- 2017–2019: BK Ventspils (assistant)
- 2019–2022: Kalev/Cramo (assistant)
- 2022: ERA Nymburk (assistant)
- 2023: Lietkabelis Panevėžys (assistant)
- 2025–2026: Anwil Włocławek (assistant)
- 2026–present: Rīgas Zeļļi (assistant)

Career highlights
- 3× LBL champion (2009, 2014, 2016); BBL champion (2013)

Akselis Vairogs (born 8 November 1985) is a Latvian former professional basketball player, and current coach, who played the shooting guard position. He currently serves as an assistant coach for Rīgas Zeļļi of the Latvian-Estonian Basketball League.

== Professional career ==
Vairogs started his career in Ventspils system playing for its farm-club Ventspils Augstskola. In the 2005-06 season, he was loaned to BK Valmiera where he became the top scorer of the Baltic Basketball League averaging 20.9 points in 31 games.

He has spent most of his career playing for Ventspils, but Vairogs also played for Slask Wroclaw in Poland, and Zemgale Jelgava in Latvia and JSA Bordeaux Basket in France.

On 8 August 2014, he re-signed a contract with Ventspils.

On 10 August 2015, he signed with Lithuanian club, BC Lietkabelis.
