= Rokas Giedraitis =

Lithuanian basketball player (born 1992)

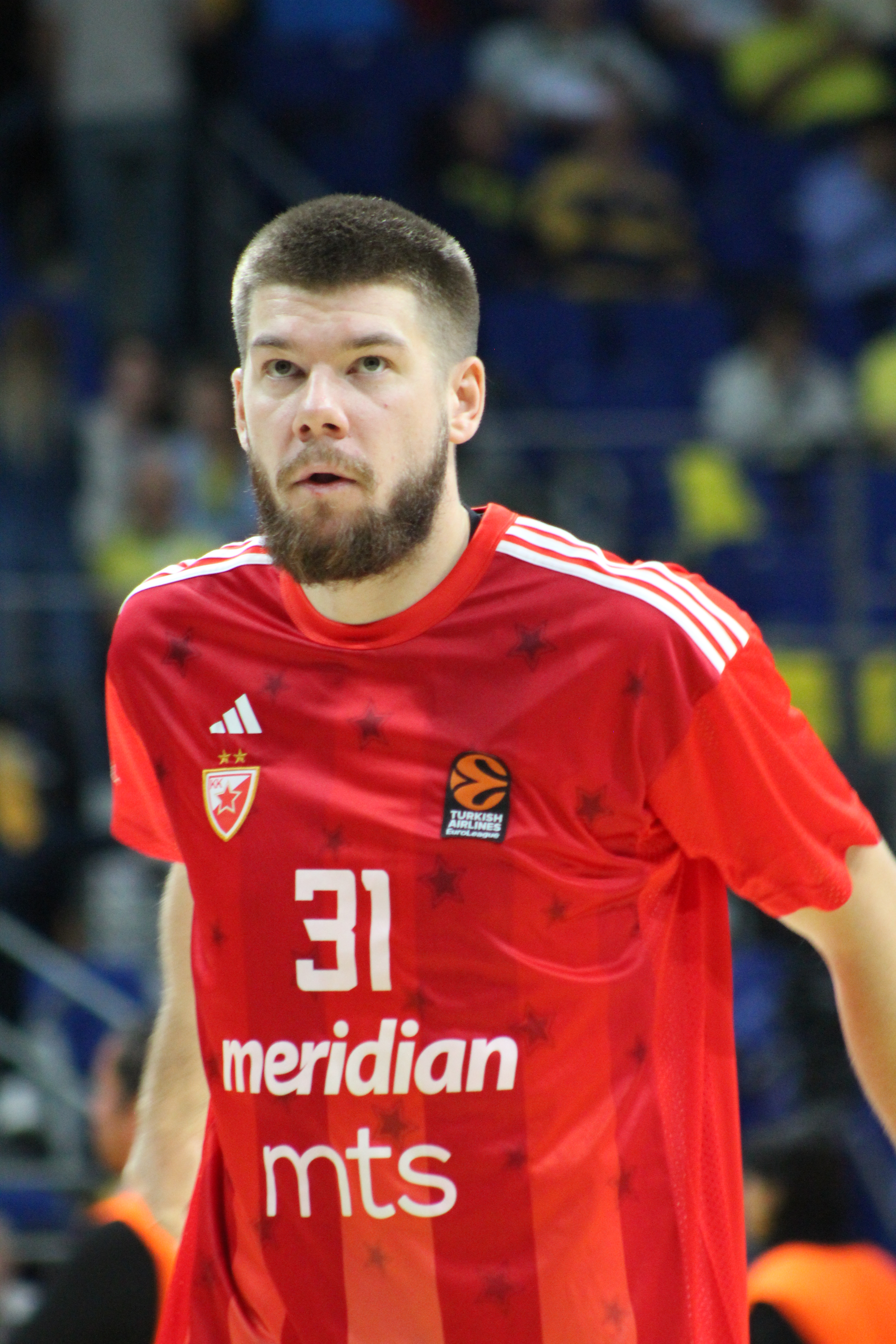
- Giedraitis with Crvena zvezda in 2024

No. 31 – La Laguna Tenerife
- Position: Small forward
- League: Liga ACB; EuroCup

Personal information
- Born: August 16, 1992 (age 34) Tauragė, Lithuania
- Listed height: 6 ft 7 in (2.01 m)
- Listed weight: 194 lb (88 kg)

Career information
- NBA draft: 2014: undrafted
- Playing career: 2011–present

Career history
- 2011–2012: Šiaulių ABRO-Universitetas
- 2012–2013: Mažeikiai
- 2013–2015: Šiauliai
- 2015–2018: Lietuvos rytas
- 2016: →Šiauliai
- 2018–2020: Alba Berlin
- 2020–2023: Baskonia
- 2023–2025: Crvena zvezda
- 2025–present: La Laguna Tenerife

Career highlights
- All-EuroCup First Team (2019); ABA League champion (2024); 3× Baltic Basketball League champion (2014–2016); Bundesliga champion (2020); Serbian League champion (2024); King Mindaugas Cup winner (2016); BBL-Pokal winner (2020); Serbian Cup winner (2024); NKL Finals MVP (2013); Lithuanian League leading scorer (2015); LKL All-Star (2015); Baltic League Finals MVP (2016); All-LKL Team (2018); All-Liga ACB Second Team (2021)
Medals
Men's basketball
Representing Lithuania
FIBA Europe Under-20 Championship
Gold medal – first place	2012 Slovenia	Team competition
FIBA World Under-19 Championship
Gold medal – first place	2011 Latvia	Team competition

Rokas Giedraitis (born August 16, 1992) is a Lithuanian professional basketball player for La Laguna Tenerife of the Spanish Liga ACB and the EuroCup. He primarily plays at the small forward position.

== Professional career ==
In 2013, Giedraitis was named Finals MVP of the NKL after scoring 26 points and leading his team to title. He then signed with BC Šiauliai club in which his father played his whole career. After continuing his solid playing, Giedraitis was later signed by the Lithuanian powerhouse Lietuvos rytas Vilnius and joined it in 2015. On July 5, 2018, Giedraitis terminated his contract with the team.

On July 6, 2018, he signed a three-year contract with Alba Berlin of the Basketball Bundesliga.

On July 4, 2020, Giedraitis signed a three-year deal with the Spanish Liga ACB champions Saski Baskonia. On 9 October 2020, Giedraitis scored 26 points in the EuroLeague and this way achieved his new career-high in the league. On July 14, 2023, Giedratis parted ways with Baskonia after three seasons together.

On the same day he signed a one-year contract with Crvena zvezda of the Serbian KLS, Adriatic league and the EuroLeague.

== National team career ==
He won two gold medals with Lithuania national teams: FIBA World U-19 in 2011 and Europe U-20 in 2012. In 2015 Giedraitis was included into the Lithuania men's national basketball team head coach Jonas Kazlauskas extended candidates list. He also participated in the national team training camp, but was released on August 16. He returned to the national team in 2016, but yet again was quickly released on July 5. In 2017, Giedraitis was invited to team's training camp in preparation for the EuroBasket 2017 championship, only to be released on August 11.

In 2019, at the age of 27, Giedraitis made his national team debut, after being selected to the final 12-man roster for the 2019 FIBA Basketball World Cup by the head coach Dainius Adomaitis.

== Career statistics ==
Legend
GP	Games played	GS	Games started	MPG	Minutes per game
FG%	Field-goal percentage	3P%	3-point field-goal percentage	FT%	Free-throw percentage
RPG	Rebounds per game	APG	Assists per game	SPG	Steals per game
BPG	Blocks per game	PPG	Points per game	PIR	Performance index rating
**Bold**	Career high

=== EuroLeague ===
Year	Team	GP	GS	MPG	FG%	3P%	FT%	RPG	APG	SPG	BPG	PPG	PIR
2019–20	Alba Berlin	25	21	27.0	.469	.398	**.844**	4.0	1.4	**1.4**	.1	**13.8**	**14.7**
2020–21	Baskonia	**34**	**33**	**28.8**	**.475**	**.405**	.824	3.0	1.5	1.1	.1	12.7	12.9
2021–22	Baskonia	29	26	**28.8**	.459	.398	.806	3.2	1.3	1.0	.1	11.1	11.8
2022–23	Baskonia	**34**	32	26.6	.444	.293	.822	**5.9**	**1.6**	.9	**.2**	10.4	13.5
2023–24	Crvena zvezda	**34**	23	25.4	.445	.341	.815	3.8	.9	.9	.1	10.0	9.8
Career		156	135	27.3	.459	.369	.823	4.0	1.4	1.1	.1	11.5	12.5

=== EuroCup ===
Year	Team	GP	GS	MPG	FG%	3P%	FT%	RPG	APG	SPG	BPG	PPG	PIR
2015–16	Lietuvos rytas	10	2	17.8	.429	.217	**.889**	1.8	.6	1.0	**.4**	6.1	5.0
2016–17	Lietuvos rytas	14	0	21.6	**.495**	.410	.765	2.2	.5	—	**.4**	9.7	8.0
2017–18	Lietuvos rytas	16	1	25.1	.467	.360	.689	2.9	**1.6**	1.2	**.4**	12.4	11.8
2018–19	Alba Berlin	**24**	**21**	**28.0**	.486	**.421**	.846	**4.1**	1.4	**1.6**	.3	**14.8**	**15.8**
Career		64	24	24.3	.477	.387	.787	3.0	1.1	1.0	.3	11.7	11.4

=== FIBA EuroChallenge ===
Year	Team	GP	GS	MPG	FG%	3P%	FT%	RPG	APG	SPG	BPG	PPG
2014–15	Šiauliai	6	6	25.5	.404	.281	.833	3.2	1.7	1.3	.2	11.0
Career		6	6	25.5	.404	.281	.833	3.2	1.7	1.3	.2	11.0

=== Domestic leagues ===
Year	Team	League	GP	MPG	FG%	3P%	FT%	RPG	APG	SPG	BPG	PPG
2011–12	(Lithuania) Šiauliai Universitetas	NKL	44	31.6	.420	.340	.737	4.0	1.2	1.7	1.8	16.1
2012–13	(Lithuania) Mažeikiai	NKL	34	30.5	.463	.350	.752	3.7	1.8	1.8	.8	17.2
2013–14	(Lithuania) Šiauliai	LKL	31	22.4	.483	.362	.688	2.4	1.4	1.2	.7	11.5
2013–14	(Lithuania) Šiauliai	BBL	15	23.4	.477	.346	.867	2.5	1.3	.6	.6	11.8
2014–15	(Lithuania) Šiauliai	LKL	43	28.2	.491	.397	.770	2.8	1.8	1.6	.5	15.2
2014–15	(Lithuania) Šiauliai	BBL	8	29.8	.436	.373	.929	2.7	2.0	1.7	.5	15.9
2015–16	(Lithuania) Šiauliai	LKL	15	30.3	.494	.389	.750	4.1	2.1	2.1	.6	16.5
2015–16	(Lithuania) Šiauliai	BBL	23	16.4	.496	.400	.750	1.4	1.1	1.1	.2	7.6
2015–16	(Lithuania) Lietuvos rytas	LKL	6	29.0	.465	.257	.826	3.7	1.8	1.5	.2	15.7
2016–17	(Lithuania) Lietuvos rytas	LKL	48	26.3	.422	.368	.664	2.7	2.0	1.5	.4	8.7
2017–18	(Lithuania) Lietuvos rytas	LKL	48	25.0	.521	.418	.802	3.8	1.7	1.3	.2	12.5
2018–19	(Germany) Alba Berlin	BBL	42	24.1	.507	.401	.772	2.6	.9	.9	.3	12.2
2019–20	(Germany) Alba Berlin	BBL	27	23.8	.456	.336	.859	3.5	1.5	1.1	.3	10.8
2020–21	(Spain) Baskonia	ACB	39	30.3	.469	.354	.822	3.4	1.6	1.4	.1	13.3
2021–22	(Spain) Baskonia	ACB	38	29.0	.417	.364	.913	3.4	1.5	1.3	.1	10.7
2022–23	(Spain) Baskonia	ACB	33	22.2	.577	.436	.787	3.8	1.0	.8	.1	10.8
2023–24	(Serbia) Crvena zvezda	KLS	2	23.9	.500	.300	1.000	3.5	1.5	.5	—	11.0
2023–24	(Serbia) Crvena zvezda	ABA	32	21.4	.513	.441	.759	3.0	1.7	.7	.2	9.5

== Personal life ==
He is the son of the basketball coach and former BC Šiauliai star Robertas Giedraitis.
