= Zemgale Olympic Center =

Multi-purpose stadium in Latvia

Coordinates: 56.6608°N 23.7558°E

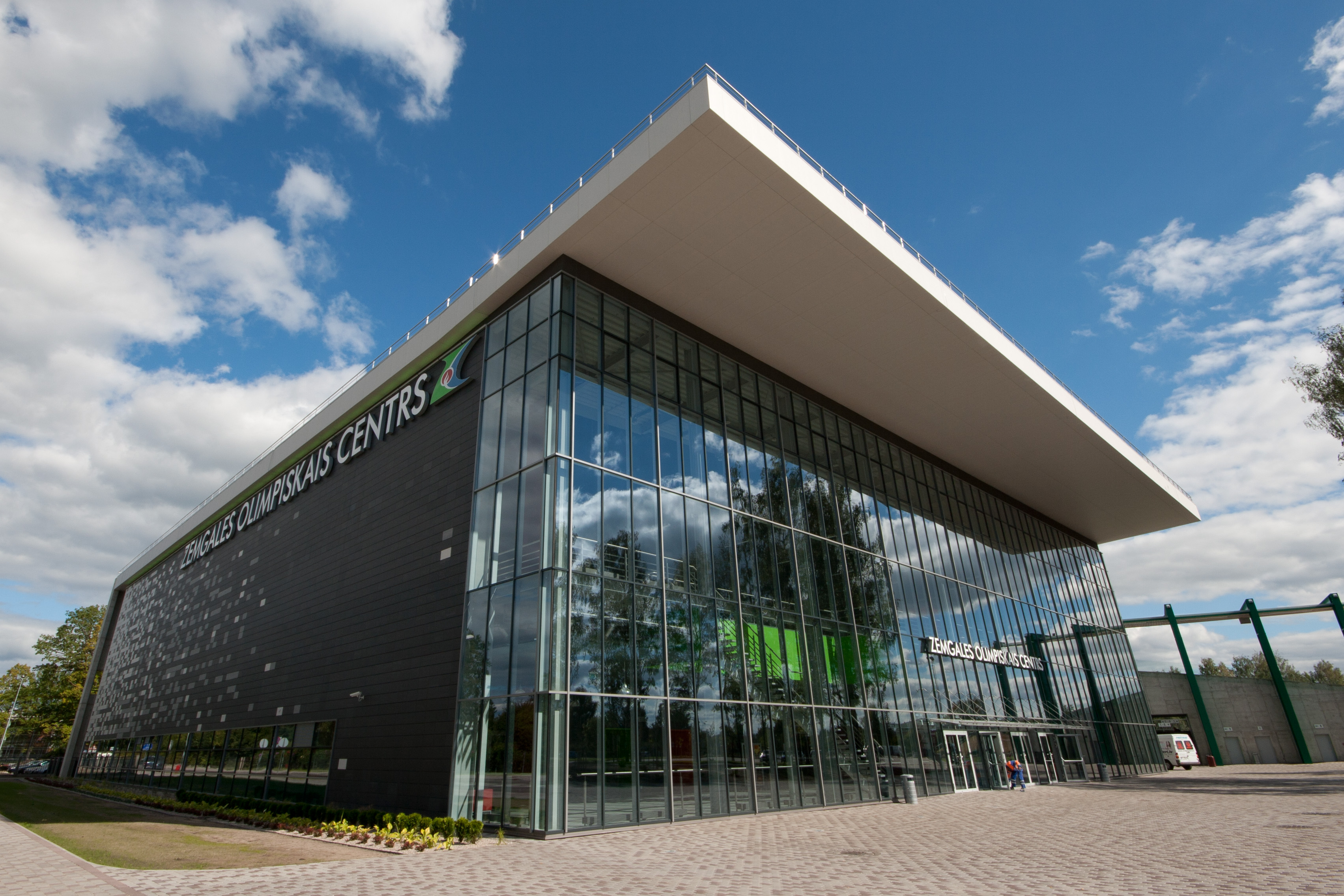
Zemgale Olympic Center

The Zemgale Olympic Center (Latvian: Zemgales Olimpiskais centrs) is a multi-sports complex located in Jelgava, Latvia. It contains many facilities including an athletics field and football stadium, which serves as the home ground of FK Jelgava and BK Jelgava. The capacity of the football stadium is 1,560.
