= Jānis Kaufmanis =

Latvian basketball player

No. 5 – Gulbenes Buki
- Position: Shooting guard

Personal information
- Born: October 3, 1989 (age 37) Rīga, Latvia
- Listed height: 1.86 m (6 ft 1 in)
- Listed weight: 88 kg (194 lb)

Career information
- Playing career: 2007–present

Career history
- 2007–2011: BK Valmiera
- 2011–2012: VEF Rīga
- 2012–2014: BK Valmiera
- 2014–2015: Força Lleida
- 2015–2018: Valmiera/Ordo
- 2018–2019: Valmiera Glass ViA
- 2019–2020: BK Ventspils
- 2020–2021: Kalev/Cramo
- 2021–2022: Valmiera Glass ViA
- 2022: Ermis Schimatari
- 2023: Sant Antoni
- 2023–2024: Valmiera Glass ViA
- 2024-present: Gulbenes Buki

Career highlights
- 2× Latvian League champion (2012, 2016); Latvian-Estonian League champion (2021); Estonian League champion (2021); Estonian Cup winner (2020)
Medals
Men's basketball
Representing Latvia
European U-18 Championship
Bronze medal – third place	2007 Spain	U-18 Team

Jānis Kaufmanis (born October 3, 1989) is a Latvian professional basketball player who plays for his hometown team Valmiera Glass ViA. Prior he has played for top tier Latvian teams BK Valmiera, VEF Rīga, BK Ventspils and Kalev/Cramo. Kaufmanis is two time Latvian champion and Estonian champion.

== Professional career ==
Jānis Kaufmanis started his professional career for his hometown team Valmiera in 2007. In his second season shooting guard suffered knee injury that sidelined player for half of a year. In 2010 Kaufmanis started ascending as one of teams leaders, receiving interest from VEF Rīga which signed a three-year deal with Kaufmanis in 2011. Due to an injury ruined season, Kaufmanis stayed with VEF for only one year before coming back to Valmiera.

In a very successful 2012-2013 campaign Kaufmanis, together with Jānis Bērziņš, forged Latvian League bronze medals for Valmiera. In that time Kaufmanis proved himself as one of the deadliest sharpshooters in Latvian basketball and his isolation move was Valmiera's teams go-to play in low shot clock situations.

In the 2014-2015 season Kaufmanis tried his force abroad, joining Spanish LEB Oro team Força Lleida. After year in Spain basketball player came back to his home towns team Valmiera/Ordo, who in this point due to financial influx was rapidly growing its ambitions in local basketball stage. Spring of 2016 came with a historical triumph for Valmiera basketball, winning Latvian League championship in a seven-game series over VEF Rīga. Kaufmanis was a substantial contributor coming off the bench.

Next two seasons Kaufmanis stayed with Valmiera/Ordo, but due to financial instability team could not repeat its championship conquest. In 2018 Kaufmanis overtook all time leading scorer position in Valmiera basketball history previously held by Sandis Amoliņš. After Valmiera/Ordo bankruptcy Kaufmanis joined Valmiera student basketball team Valmiera Glass ViA which was promoted to newly founded Latvian-Estonian League, where Kaufmanis become second highest scorer in tournaments first season.

In least seasons shooting guard has played for Latvian championships richest team BK Ventspils and Estonian powerhouse Kalev/Cramo.

== Latvian National Team ==
Kaufmanis has played for Latvian U16, U18 and U20 National teams. In 2007, Kaufmanis was a part of the Latvian Under-18 junior national team that won the bronze medal at the 2007 FIBA Europe Under-18 Championship, which was held in Madrid, Spain. That was first medal for Latvian youth basketball in European championships. Kaufmanis debuted for Latvian national team in 2010.
