= Agris Galvanovskis =

Latvian basketball player and coach

Free Agent
- Title: Head coach

Personal information
- Born: 30 January 1972 (age 54) Madona, Latvija
- Listed height: 6 ft 5 in (1.96 m)

Career information
- Playing career: 1989–2003
- Position: Shooting guard
- Coaching career: 2003–present

Career history

Coaching
- 2003–2006: BK Gulbenes Buki
- 2006–2008: BK Ventspils (assistant)
- 2008–2010: BK Ventspils
- 2010–2012: BK Liepājas Lauvas
- 2012–2014: MBC Mykolaiv
- 2014–2016: Barons/LDz
- 2016–2019: Liepāja/Triobet
- 2019–2021: BK Jēkabpils

Agris Galvanovskis (born 30 January 1972) is a Latvian former professional basketball player and a current head coach for BK Liepājas Lauvas of the LBL.

== Playing career ==
Galvanovskis played professional basketball for Latvian teams VEF Rīga, ASK Rīga, Princips, Bonus, Metropole, ASK/Brocēni/LMT and BK Gulbenes Buki. He also played for Latvian National Team.

== Coaching career ==
Agris Galvanovskis began working as a basketball coach during his playing career with BK Gulbenes Buki when he coached local youth teams and was player-coach in his team. In 2006, he signed on as the assistant coach of BK Ventspils. In 2008, Galvanovskis was promoted to head coach of Ventspils team.

He won the 2009 Latvian Basketball League championship with Ventspils. He moved to BK Liepājas Lauvas in 2010 to work as head coach. Galvanovskis became the head coach of the Ukrainian club MBC Mykolaiv, in June 2012.

In 2008 and 2011, Galvanovskis coached Latvian U20 team.
