= BC Palanga =

- Leagues: National Basketball League
- Founded: 2014
- History: Palanga (2014–2018)
- Arena: Palanga Arena
- Location: Palanga, Lithuania
- Team colors: Blue, white and orange
- President: (Lithuania) Bronius Martinkus
- Head coach: (Lithuania) Povilas Šakinis
- Championships: NKL Champions (2010)
- Website: bcpalanga.lt
Home	Away

BC Palanga was a professional basketball club based in Palanga, Lithuania that played in the National Basketball League. The team was founded in 2014 after a confusing situation when the BC Palanga team founded in 1999 moved to Vilnius.

== Last year's roster ==
Palangos "Palanga" roster
Players
Coaches

Pos.	No.	Nat.	Name	Ht.	Wt.	Age
C	41	(Senegal)	Gueye, Doudou	2.08 m (6 ft 10 in)	111 kg (245 lb)	33 – 1 January 1992
SF	1	(Lithuania)	Jonauskas, Kasparas	1.97 m (6 ft 6 in)	74 kg (163 lb)	23 – 25 January 2002
SG	8	(Lithuania)	Maksvytis, Eimantas	1.88 m (6 ft 2 in)	75 kg (165 lb)	25 – 27 August 1999
PF	7	(Lithuania)	Marcinkevičius, Darius	2.01 m (6 ft 7 in)	90 kg (198 lb)	33 – 9 July 1991
PF	5	(Lithuania)	Remeikis, Laimonas	2.00 m (6 ft 7 in)	92 kg (203 lb)	28 – 8 February 1997
PG	3	(Lithuania)	Staniulis, Mantvydas	1.86 m (6 ft 1 in)	79 kg (174 lb)	28 – 3 March 1997
PG	6	(Lithuania)	Šuliauskas, Augustas	1.80 m (5 ft 11 in)	76 kg (168 lb)	29 – 18 August 1995
SG	4	(Lithuania)	Venckus, Augustinas	1.90 m (6 ft 3 in)	82 kg (181 lb)	27 – 17 October 1997
PG	10	(Lithuania)	Vieversys, Justas	1.88 m (6 ft 2 in)	66 kg (146 lb)	25 – 4 January 2000
SF	15	(United States)	Williams, Jaleel Laquin	2.00 m (6 ft 7 in)	100 kg (220 lb)	32 – 18 September 1992

Head coach

- (Lithuania) Povilas Šakinis

Assistant coach(es)

- (Lithuania) Paulius Barkus

Legend

- (C) Team captain
- Injured

- Roster
Updated: 2018-01-23

== Club history ==
- The team was founded in 2014, in a confusing situation when two teams wanted to play in Palanga, that being against the LKF rules as Palanga is a city too small to host two teams, the original BC Palanga moved to Vilnius and the newly founded team stayed in Palanga.
