= Artūrs Bērziņš =

Latvian basketball player

BK Ogre
- Title: Assistant coach
- League: LatEst

Personal information
- Born: June 12, 1988 (age 38) Ogre, Latvian SSR, Soviet Union
- Listed height: 2.04 m (6 ft 8 in)
- Listed weight: 106 kg (234 lb)

Career information
- Playing career: 2008–2018
- Position: Power forward
- Number: 14
- Coaching career: 2019–present

Career history

Playing
- 2008–2013: BK Ventspils
- 2013–2015: VEF Rīga
- 2015–2017: Valmiera/ORDO
- 2017–2018: BK Ventspils
- 2018: Livanu stikls
- 2018: Ogre/Kumho Tyre

Coaching
- 2019–present: BK Ogre (assistant)

Career highlights
- 3x Latvian League champion (2009, 2015, 2016); Latvian League Finals MVP (2016)

Artūrs Bērziņš (born June 12, 1988) is a Latvian former basketball player, who plays the power forward position. For the 2017–2018 season he is signed with the BK Ventspils of the Latvian Basketball League. He is now youth basketball coach and an assistant coach for BK Ogre.

He has represented the Latvian national team in EuroBasket 2011.
