= Jānis Bērziņš (basketball) =

Latvian basketball player (born 1993)

No. 31 – Rīgas Zeļļi
- Position: Small forward
- League: LEBL

Personal information
- Born: 4 May 1993 (age 33) Limbaži, Latvia
- Listed height: 2.01 m (6 ft 7 in)
- Listed weight: 96 kg (212 lb)

Career information
- NBA draft: 2015: undrafted
- Playing career: 2009–present

Career history
- 2009–2011: BK Valmiera
- 2011–2012: VEF Rīga
- 2012–2013: → BK Valmiera
- 2013–2016: VEF Rīga
- 2016–2017: Orlandina Basket
- 2018–2020: Ventspils
- 2020–2021: Stelmet Zielona Góra
- 2021–2022: Baxi Manresa
- 2022: Larisa
- 2022–2023: Legia Warsaw
- 2023–2024: Sokół Łańcut
- 2024: Kalev/Cramo
- 2024–2025: Górnik Wałbrzych
- 2025–present: Rīgas Zeļļi

Career highlights
- Polish Cup winner (2025); Estonian League champion (2024); 2× LBL champion (2012, 2015); Polish Cup winner (2021); Polish Supercup winner (2020); Estonian Cup winner (2024)
Medals
Men's basketball
Representing Latvia
FIBA Europe Under-20 Championship
Silver medal – second place	2013 Estonia	National Team

Jānis Bērziņš (born 4 May 1993) is a Latvian professional basketball player for Rīgas Zeļļi of the Latvian–Estonian Basketball League (LEBL). Standing at 2.01 m (6' 7") he plays at the small forward position.

== Professional career ==
Jānis Bērziņš who in childhood was raised in Latvian most northern town Rūjiena started his professional career in 2009 with BK Valmiera. He played there for two seasons until he joined VEF Rīga, signing a multiyear contract. After his first season with VEF he was loaned back to Valmiera. Bērziņš had very successful 2012–2013 campaign. First he played major role for Valmiera, that won Latvian League bronze medals, which was followed by invitation to participate in Adidas Eurocamp, which was held in Treviso, Italy.

In August 2013, after an impressive showing with Latvian team in U20 European Championship, Bērziņš signed an extension with VEF Rīga. He also had contract offer from Spanish powerhouse Barcelona, but instead chose Riga as best place for his development.

On 2 July 2020 he signed with Stelmet Zielona Góra of the Polish League.

On 16 July 2021 he signed with Baxi Manresa of the Spanish Liga ACB.

On 14 January 2022 Berzins moved to Larisa of the Greek Basket League. In 25 league games, he averaged 5.7 points, 3.4 rebounds and 1 assist, playing around 18 minutes per contest.

On 14 July 2022 he signed with Legia Warszawa of the Polish Basketball League.

On August 17, 2024, he signed with Górnik Wałbrzych of the Polish Basketball League (PLK).

== Latvian National Team ==
Jānis has played for Latvian U16, U18 and U20 National Team as well as Senior National Team. In July 2013, Bērziņš was big part of Latvia's historic run at U20 European Championship in Tallinn, Estonia, which was highlighted by making finals, while Jānis was named to All-Tournament team.
