= BK Jūrmala =

Latvian basketball club

Jūrmala
- Leagues: LBL; Baltic League; Latvian–Estonian Basketball League
- Founded: 1999; 27 years ago
- Folded: 2020; 6 years ago
- Arena: Jūrmala State Gymnasium (Jūrmalas Valsts ģimnāzija)
- Location: Jūrmala, Latvia
- Website: bkjurmala.lv

BK Jūrmala were a professional basketball club based in Jūrmala, Latvia. They played in the Latvian–Estonian Basketball League, having previously played in the Latvian Basketball League (since 2005) and Baltic Basketball Leagues. The club was founded in 1999 and ceased in 2020. Until 2006 the team was known as I.O.S./Jūrmala, then later as Jūrmalas Sports/Fēnikss.

== Roster ==
As of September 3, 2024

#		Player	Pos.	Height
1	(Latvia)	Nikolajs Sadikovs	PG	187 cm
2	(Latvia)	Kristers Pauls Maura	PG	192 cm
6	(United States)	Carl Anthony Montgomery	C	203 cm
8	(Latvia)	Oskars Hlebovickis	SF	196 cm
9	(Latvia)	Edgars Jeromanovs	PG	186 cm
10	(Latvia)	Kristaps Mediss	SG	188 cm
11	(Latvia)	Jurijs Aleksejevs	PF	203 cm
15	(Latvia)	Ugis Pinete	PG	194 cm
16	(Latvia)	Lauris Blaus	C	206 cm
17	(Belarus)	Dzianis Vikentsyeu	C	206 cm
20	(Latvia)	Kaspars Vecvagars	SG	191 cm
21	(Latvia)	Roberts Krastins	SF	196 cm
24	(Latvia)	Maris Ziedins	C	202 cm
33	(Latvia)	Kristaps Pļavnieks	PG	183 cm
34	(Latvia)	Kaspars Kambala	C	206 cm

== Notable players ==
- Andrew Smith

== Season by season ==
Season	League	Pos.	Baltic League
2011–12	LBL	7th	
2012–13	LBL	8th	
2013–14	LBL	4th	
2014–15	LBL	5th	Regular season
2015–16	LBL	5th	Round of 16
2016–17	LBL	7th	Round of 16
2017–18	LBL	3rd	Runner-up
