= Rait Käbin =

Estonian basketball player and coach

Personal information
- Born: September 2, 1981 (age 45)
- Listed height: 1.85 m (6 ft 1 in)

Career information
- Playing career: 1999–2009
- Position: Point guard
- Coaching career: 2009–present

Career history

Playing
- 1999–2000: Tallinna Ülikoolid-A. Le Coq
- 2000–2003: Kalev
- 2003–2004: Tallinna Kalev
- 2006–2009: Pärnu

Coaching
- 2009–2012: Pärnu
- 2012–2013: Pärnu (assistant)
- 2013–2015: Kalev/Cramo (assistant)
- 2015–2019: TalTech
- 2015–2021: Estonia (assistant)
- 2018–: Estonia U-18 (assistant)

Rait Käbin (born 2 September 1981) is an Estonian professional basketball coach, and a former professional basketball player. He is currently the director of TalTech.
