= BK Liepāja =

Latvian basketball club

- Leagues: Latvian–Estonian Basketball League; Latvian Basketball League; European North Basketball League
- Founded: 1991; 35 years ago
- History: Liepājas Metalurgs; Baltika/Kaija; BK Liepāja; Līvu alus/Liepāja; Liepājas Lauvas; Betsafe/Liepāja; BK Liepāja
- Arena: Liepāja Olympic Center
- Capacity: 2542
- Location: Liepāja, Latvia
- Team colors: Dark blue, white and red
- President: (Latvia) Āris Ozoliņš
- Team manager: (Latvia) Normunds Atvars
- Head coach: (Latvia) Gundars Vētra
- Website: liepajasbasketbols.lv
Home	Away

BK Liepāja is a professional basketball club in Liepāja (Latvia), playing in the Latvian-Estonian Basketball League, Latvian Basketball League and European North Basketball League.

Liepāja team's greatest achievement in Latvian Basketball League came in 1997 when it won second place. It has also come in third in 2000, 2011, 2012, and 2023.

== History ==
Basketball team named “Sarkanais metalurgs” from the city of Liepāja first won Latvian SSR championship in 1963. During the years teams changed names, since 1991, after Latvia regained independence from Soviet Union, according to sponsorships. Previous team names were Liepājas Metalurgs, Baltika/Kaija, BK Liepāja, Līvu alus/Liepāja, Liepājas Lauvas, Liepāja/Triobet.

In May 2018, the team was reorganized into Liepājas Basketbols with the goal of creating a unified basketball system for Liepāja for junior and professional player development. The team announced the beginning of its sponsorship by Betsafe following Betsson's decision to merge the Triobet brand, which previously sponsored BK Liepāja, into that brand.

Since 2020, with the hiring of Latvian National team assistant and 2018 FIBA U18 European Championship silver medalist Artūrs Visockis-Rubenis as their head coach, BK Liepāja focuses on building teams around new talents.

In 2021/2022 season BK Liepāja made their international debut, competing in newly founded European North Basketball League. Liepāja won one of five games and finished the tournament at 5th place.

During the 2022/2023 season Liepāja won the bronze medal in Latvian league. Many players established themselves for the next level. After an excellent season with Liepāja, Kārlis Šiliņš signed in German Bundesliga. Renārs Birkāns signed with 10-time Latvian champion BK Ventspils.

== Season by season ==
Season	League	Pos.	Baltic League	Pos.	Latvian-Estonian League	Pos.
1991–92	LBL	8th				
1992–93	LBL	8th				
1993–94	LBL	11th				
1994–95	LBL	9th				
1995–96	LBL	7th				
1996–97	LBL	2nd				
1997–98	LBL	5th				
1998–99	LBL	5th				
1999–00	LBL	3rd				
2000–01	LBL	4th				
2001–02	LBL	7th				
2002–03	LBL	4th				
2003–04	LBL	5th				
2004–05	LBL	5th	Challenge Cup	5th		
2005–06	LBL	6th	Elite Division	13th		
2006–07	LBL	4th				
2007–08	LBL	6th	Challenge Cup	4th		
2008–09	LBL	6th	Challenge Cup	8th		
2009–10	LBL	5th	Elite Division	9th		
2010–11	LBL	3rd	Elite Division	12th		
2011–12	LBL	3rd	Elite Division	14th		
2012–13	LBL	9th	Regular season			
2013–14	LBL	6th	Round of 16			
2014–15	LBL	4th	Round of 16			
2015–16	LBL	4th	Quarterfinalist			
2016–17	LBL	6th	Quarterfinalist			
2017–18	LBL	8th	Regular season			
2018–19	LBL	7th			Latvian–Estonian Basketball League	13th
2019–20	LBL	7th			Latvian–Estonian Basketball League	cancelled
2020–21	LBL	3rd			Latvian–Estonian Basketball League	7th
2021–22	LBL	6th			Latvian–Estonian Basketball League	12th
2022–23	LBL	3rd			Latvian–Estonian Basketball League	10th
2023–24	LBL	4th			Latvian–Estonian Basketball League	11th
2024–25	LBL	6th			Latvian–Estonian Basketball League	7th

Season	League	Regional	Europe	Latvian Cup	Head coach
2025-26	Latvian League; Quarter-finals	Latvian–Estonian League; 11th place	did not participate	Latvian Cup; Quarter-finals	Artūrs Visockis-Rubenis

== Players ==
=== Current roster ===
BK Liepāja roster
Players
Coaches

Pos.	No.	Nat.	Name	Ht.	Wt.	Age
SF	0	(United States)	Dyson Koehler	2.01 m (6 ft 7 in)	100 kg (220 lb)	24 – 10 December 2001
SG	1	(Latvia)	Edvards Egle	1.90 m (6 ft 3 in)	84 kg (185 lb)	21 – 7 October 2005
C	3	(Latvia)	Henriks Bajārs	2.15 m (7 ft 1 in)	100 kg (220 lb)	24 – 31 May 2002
SG	4	(United States)	Julian Bryant	1.92 m (6 ft 4 in)	87 kg (192 lb)	25 – 27 May 2001
PG	5	(Latvia)	Reds Martinsons	1.83 m (6 ft 0 in)	74 kg (163 lb)	19 – 11 September 2007
SG	7	(Latvia)	Edvards Jonaitis	1.93 m (6 ft 4 in)	84 kg (185 lb)	17 – 7 November 2008
PF	8	(Latvia)	Rodijs Mačoha	2.02 m (6 ft 8 in)	100 kg (220 lb)	23 – 29 October 2002
SF	10	(Latvia)	Kristiāns Šulcs	1.93 m (6 ft 4 in)	92 kg (203 lb)	24 – 26 September 2002
PF	18	(Latvia)	Reinis Avotiņš	2.05 m (6 ft 9 in)	92 kg (203 lb)	28 – 6 May 1998
PF	23	(Estonia)	Ivo Van Tamm	2.03 m (6 ft 8 in)	103 kg (227 lb)	30 – 23 June 1996
SG	28	(Latvia)	Francis Neilands	1.94 m (6 ft 4 in)	85 kg (187 lb)	21 – 17 February 2005
C	35	(Lithuania)	Rokas Jocius	2.08 m (6 ft 10 in)	111 kg (245 lb)	23 – 4 July 2003
PG	44	(Latvia)	Edgars Lasenbergs	1.86 m (6 ft 1 in)	85 kg (187 lb)	31 – 7 April 1995

Head coach

- (Latvia) Gundars Vētra

Assistant coach(es)

- (Latvia) Arvis Steckis
- (Latvia) Olafs Ozols

Strength & conditioning coach(es)

- (Latvia) Aigars Bergsons

Physiotherapist(s)

- (Latvia) Līvija Grantiņa

Legend

- (C) Team captain
- Injured

- Roster
Updated: October 20, 2026

=== Depth chart ===
Pos.	Starting 5	Bench 1	Reserve
C	Rokas Jocius	Henriks Bajārs
PF	Rodijs Mačoha	Ivo Van Tamm	Reinis Avotiņš
SF	Kristiāns Šulcs	Dyson Koehler
SG	Francis Neilands	Edvards Egle	Julian Bryant
PG	Edgars Lasenbergs	Reds Martinsons	Edvards Jonaitis

=== Squad changes for the 2026–27 season ===
==== In ====
Note: Flags indicate national team, as has been defined under FIBA eligibility rules. Players may hold more than one non-FIBA nationality.

No.	Pos.	Nat.	Player
	PG	(Latvia) LAT	Francis Neilands (from (Latvia) Latvijas Universitāte)
	C	(Latvia) LAT	Reinis Avotiņš (from (Latvia) BK Ogre)
	SF	(Latvia) LAT	Renārs Jasāns (from (Latvia) (2) RBS Rīgas Juniori)
	PG	(Latvia) LAT	Edgars Lasenbergs (from (Austria) Traiskirchen Lions)
	PF	(Latvia) LAT	Rodijs Mačoha (from (Latvia) Rīgas Zeļļi)
	SG	(United States) USA	Julian Bryant (from (Albania) KB Vllaznia)
	C	(Lithuania) LTU	Rokas Jocius (from (NCAA) Loyola Marymount Lions)
	PF	(Estonia) EST	Ivo Van Tamm (from (Estonia) TalTech/ALEXELA)
	SF	(United States) USA	Dyson Koehler (from (Denmark) Randers Cimbria)

==== Out ====
Note: Flags indicate national team, as has been defined under FIBA eligibility rules. Players may hold more than one non-FIBA nationality.

No.	Pos.	Nat.	Player
6	PF	(Latvia) LAT	Kristians Feierbergs (to (Latvia) Rīgas Zeļļi)
11	PF	(Ukraine) UKR	Vitalii Shymanskyi (to (Estonia) Keila KK)
7	SF	(Latvia) LAT	Rinalds Timma (to (Latvia) Rigas Ekselences Juniori)
77	SF	(Latvia) LAT	Helmuts Petrovičs (to (Latvia) Rigas Ekselences Juniori)
14	C	(Latvia) LAT	Edgars Lieķis (to (Latvia) Rigas Ekselences Juniori)
8	PG	(Latvia) LAT	Emīls Krūmiņš (to (Latvia) (2) BK Grobiņa)
32	SG	(Latvia) LAT	Matīss Ozoliņš-Pese (to (Latvia) (2) BK Liepāja/LSSS)
13	SF	(Latvia) LAT	Renārs Jasāns (rent to (Latvia) Rigas Ekselences Juniori)

=== Historical rosters ===
2025-26 season roster
Pos.	Starting 5	Bench 1	Bench 2	Left team during season
C	(Latvia) #17 Henriks Bajārs	(Latvia) #14 Edgars Lieķis		(Latvia) #00 Iļja Kurucs
PF	(Ukraine) #11 Vitalii Shymanskyi	(Latvia) #6 Kristians Feierbergs		
SF	(Latvia) #77 Helmuts Petrovičs	(Latvia) #7 Rinalds Timma	(Latvia) #32 Matīss Ozoliņš-Pese	(United States) #53 Xavier Dusell
SG	(Latvia) #1 Edvards Egle	(Latvia) #10 Kristiāns Šulcs	(Latvia) #2 Edvards Jonaitis	
PG	(Latvia) #8 Emīls Krūmiņš C	(Latvia) #5 Reds Martinsons		

2024-25 season roster
Pos.	Starting 5	Bench 1	Bench 2
C	(Latvia) #15 Klāvs Dubults	(Latvia) #88 Rinalds Mālmanis	(Latvia) #17 Henriks Bajārs
PF	(Latvia) #8 Rodijs Mačoha	(Latvia) #7 Roberts Freimanis C	(Ukraine) #12 Vitalii Kuznetsov
SF	(Latvia) #22 Kristaps Miglinieks	(Latvia) #33 Rihards Kuksiks	(Latvia) #10 Kristiāns Šulcs
SG	(Latvia) #35 Kristaps Ķilps	(Latvia) #3 Mārtiņš Kilups	
PG	(Latvia) #25 Edgars Lasenbergs	(Latvia) #1 Ričards Vitoļskis	(Latvia) #5 Reds Martinsons

== Notable players ==
- (Latvia) Edgars Jeromanovs
- (Latvia) Mareks Jurevičus
- (Latvia) Mārtiņš Meiers
- (Latvia) Mareks Mejeris
- (Latvia) Jānis Porziņģis
- (Latvia) Artūrs Štālbergs
- (Latvia) Jānis Timma
- (Latvia) Raimonds Vaikulis
- (Latvia) Uģis Viļums
- (United States) Paul Butorac
- (United States) Vernon Hamilton
- (United States) Josh Mayo
- (United States) Ashton Mitchell
- (United States) Malcolm Griffin
- (United States) Kris Richard
- (Lithuania) Martynas Andriukaitis
- (Lithuania) Valdas Dabkus
- (Lithuania) Laimonas Kisielius

== Coaches ==
=== Coaches ===
- (Latvia) Gundars Vētra 2026-
- (Latvia) Artūrs Visockis-Rubenis 2020-2026
