= BK Jelgava =

Latvian basketball club

- Leagues: NBL
- Founded: 2011
- Arena: Zemgale Olympic Center
- Location: Jelgava, Latvia
- Team colors: White and Blue
- President: (Latvia) Dins Ušvils
- Head coach: (Latvia) Česlavs Mateikovičs
- Website: bkjelgava.lv

BK Jelgava is a semi-professional basketball club based in Jelgava, Latvia. The team competes in the Latvian National Basketball League (NBL), which is the country's second-tier competition below the Latvian Basketball League. Founded in 2011, the club is supported by the Jelgava municipality and has established itself as one of the leading teams in the NBL, winning league championships in 2022, 2024 and 2025.

At the end of the 2010–11 season, its predecessor, BK Zemgale, experienced financial difficulties, failure to pay their players and liabilities. As a result, BK Jelgava took their place in the Latvian Basketball League. The new club was created and funded by the city of Jelgava.
