= BK Barons =

Latvian basketball club

Barons/LDz
- Leagues: LBL; Baltic League
- Founded: 2001
- Dissolved: 2017
- History: Princips (1992–1994); LainERS (1994–2001); Barons (2001–2004); Barons/LU (2004–2006); Barons/LMT (2006–2009); Barons/O!Karte (2011–2012); Barons Kvartāls (2012–2014); Barons/LDz (2014–2017)
- Arena: Daugavas Sporta nams
- Location: Rīga, Latvia
- President: Ivo Zonne
- Head coach: Mārtiņš Gulbis
- Championships: Latvian Championships: 2 (2008, 2010); FIBA EuroCup: 1 (2008)
- Website: barons.lv
Home	Away

BK Barons/LDz (previously Barons/LMT) was a professional basketball club who was based in Riga, Latvia. The team played in the first division of the Latvian Basketball League.

== History ==
Barons Kvartāls played an integral part in Latvia's basketball history. Under the name Princips, Barons Kvartāls was one of the founding teams of the Latvian Basketball League (LBL) in 1992. In the first season Princips carried off bronze in the LBL. After two seasons Princips was renamed the LainERS, making their way into Latvia's basketball history with its first American legionary Mikki Jackson, with a cheerleader show and first ever game programmes in the Latvian league.

LainERS won LBL bronze in 1994, and in the next two seasons finished in 4th place. They also reached the semi-finals in 1998. For the next couple of seasons, they achieved no greater success.

The club's revival started in the fall of 2001 when LainERS became Barons. The road to success was made with small steps with Barons winning LBL bronze in 2004. The next two years was historical for Barons when they ended in 2nd place. Barons made history again with the first players' cards. In January 2007 the third issue of the beloved fan cards was released. In the last season of the LBL, in a series of five games, Barons/O!Karte lost to the next Latvian champions ASK Rīga in the semi-finals but won the fight for bronze against Liepājas Lauvas.

Barons/O!Karte has participated in all three of the Baltic Basketball League championships. Their highest achievement so far was in 2006 when Barons/O!Karte participated in the Final Six in Tallinn. On 15 October 2006, the Barons/O!Karte game against Kauņas Žalgiris was attended by a record high crowd of 11,500 spectators.

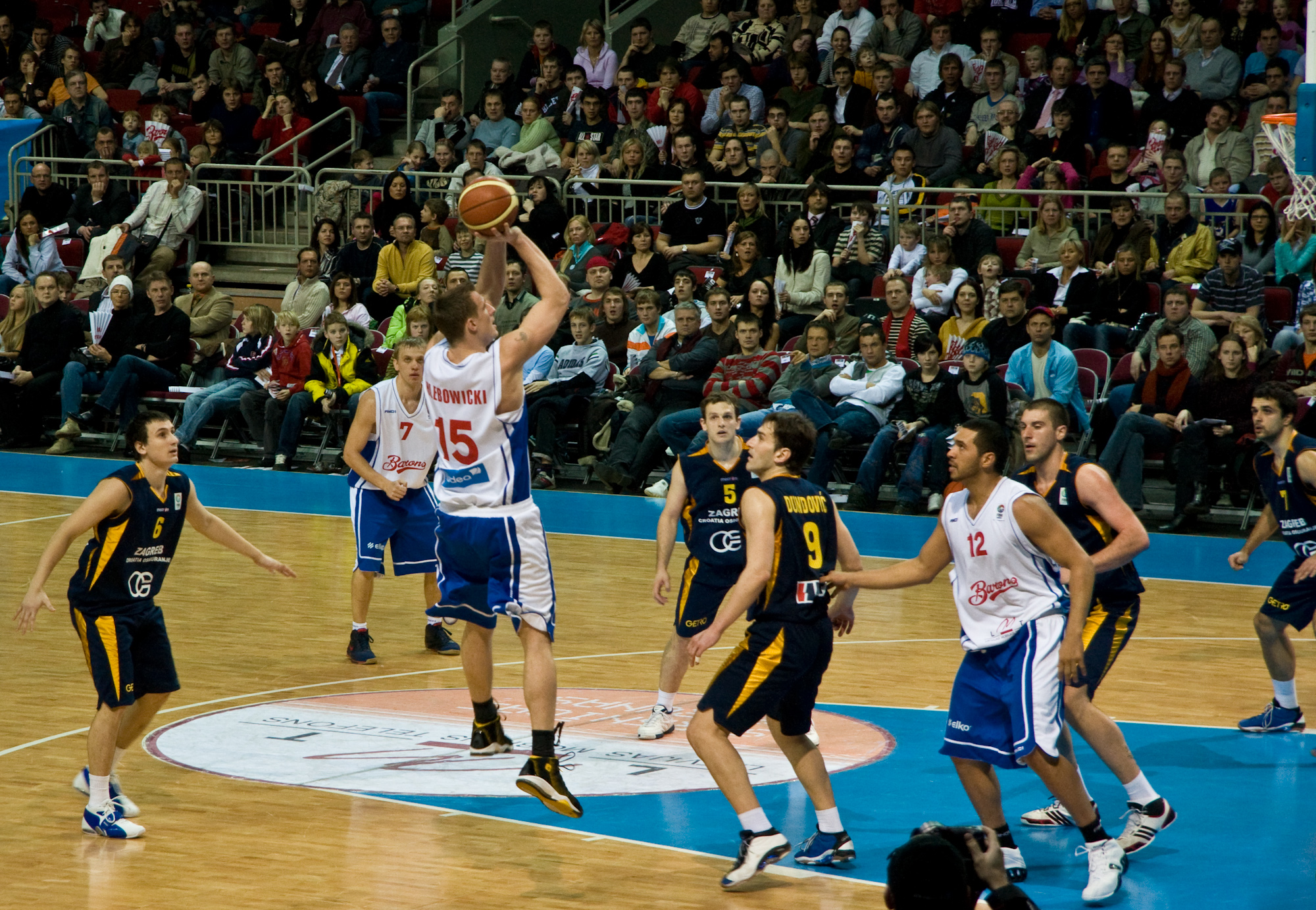
Match against KK Zagreb in 2008

The 2008 season saw Barons/O!Karte get to the Baltic Basketball League final where they lost to Kalev/Cramo in a 'best out of two' game. The season can be considered historical for Barons/O!Karte, because for the first time Barons won the Latvian championship and FIBA EuroCup.

Barons won the Latvian championship again in 2010.

During the 2011 – 2012 season, Barons played in the Latvian Basketball League 2nd division (LBL2), where they were ranked first place. The next season they came back to the LBL as Barons Kvartāls.

In September 2017 the club announced they would not participate in LBL any further due to financial reasons.

== Roster ==
As of August 3, 2016

#		Player	Pos.	Height	Weight
	(Latvia)	Salvis Mētra	G/F	195 cm	92 kg
	(Latvia)	Kristaps Mediss	G	188 cm	89 kg
	(Lithuania)	Denis Krestinin	F	202 cm

== Season by season ==
Season	League	Pos.	Significant Events	Baltic League	Pos.	European competitions
1991–92	LBL	3	–	–	–	–
1992–93	LBL	4	–	–	–	–
1993–94	LBL	3	–	–	–	–
1994–95	LBL	4	–	–	–	–
1995–96	LBL	4	–	–	–	–
1996–97	LBL	7	–	–	–	–
1997–98	LBL	4	–	–	–	–
1998–99	LBL	7	–	–	–	–
1999–00	LBL	6	–	–	–	–
2000–01	LBL	6	–	–	–	–
2001–02	LBL	5	–	–	–	–
2002–03	LBL	6	–	–	–	–
2003–04	LBL	3	–	–	–	–
2004–05	LBL	2	–	Elite Division	9	–
2005–06	LBL	2	–	Elite Division	6	Played EuroChallenge
2006–07	LBL	3	–	Elite Division	7	Played EuroChallenge
2007–08	LBL	1	–	Elite Division	4	EuroChallenge Champion
2008–09	LBL	2	–	Elite Division	8	Played EuroCup
2009–10	LBL	1	–	–	–	–
2010–11	LBL	4	–	–	–	–
2011–12	LBL 2	1	–	–	–	–
2012–13	LBL	4	–	–	–	–
2013–14	LBL	7	–	–	–	–
2014–15	LBL	6	–	–	–	–

== Notable players ==
Note: Flags indicate national team eligibility at FIBA-sanctioned events. Players may hold other non-FIBA nationalities not displayed.

Criteria

To appear in this section a player must have either:

- Set a club record or won an individual award while at the club
- Played at least one official international match for their national team at any time
- Played at least one official NBA match at any time.

- (Latvia) Kaspars Bērziņš
- (Latvia) Armands Šķēle
- (Latvia) Kristaps Valters
- (Latvia) Ernests Kalve
- (Latvia) Gatis Jahovičs
- (Lithuania) Giedrius Gustas
- (Lithuania) Dainius Adomaitis
- (Lithuania) Dovydas Redikas
- (United States) Mikki Jackson
- (United States) Kebu Stewart
- (United States) Demetrius Alexander
- (United States) Dontell Jefferson
- (United States) Tyler Cain
- (United States) Jamar Anthony Diggs

== Championships ==
- Latvian Championships: 2 (2008, 2010)
- FIBA EuroCup: 1 (2008)
