= 2025 LBL Play-offs =

Latvian national championships in basketball

LBL Play-offs
- Season: 2025
- Dates: 5 April – 22 May
- Games played: 22
- Teams: 6
- TV partner(s): TV4; Sportacentrs TV

Regular season
- Season MVP: (Latvia) Dairis Bertāns

Finals
- Champions: VEF Rīga
- Runners-up: BK Ventspils
- Third place: Rīgas Zeļļi
- Fourth place: Valmiera Glass VIA

The 2025 LBL Play-offs was the tournament to determine the Latvian Basketball League champions for the 2024–25 season. All participating teams spent the regular season in Latvian-Estonian Basketball League, with the top six Latvian teams advancing to the LBL play-offs. The play-offs began on 5 April. VEF Rīga won its 12th championship.

== Format ==
Seven Latvian teams participated in 2024–25 Latvian–Estonian Basketball League regular season, determining seeding for the play-offs, as six of them qualified for the play-offs. Top two teams qualified for semi-finals, but other four teams started the play-off with quarterfinal series. Ouarterfinal, semifinal and bronze medal series are played in the best-of-five format, but final is played in the best-of-seven series.

== Teams ==
=== Venues and locations ===
Location of teams in 2025 LBL Play-offs

Team	Home city	Arena	Capacity
BK Ogre	Ogre	Sports Arena Ogre	1700
Latvijas Universitāte	Rīga	OSC	830
Liepāja	Liepāja	Liepāja Olympic Center	2542
Valmiera Glass ViA	Valmiera	Vidzeme Olympic Center	1500
VEF Rīga	Rīga	OSC	830
Ventspils	Ventspils	Ventspils Olympic Center	3085
Rīgas Zeļļi	Rīga	Daugava Sports House	500
Rīgas Zeļļi	Rīga	Arena Riga	11 200

=== Personnel and sponsorship ===
Team	Head coach	Captain	Kit manufacturer
BK Ogre	(Latvia) Uldis Švēde	(Latvia) Kristaps Dārgais	Nike
Latvijas Universitāte	(Latvia) Marts Ozolinkevičs	(Latvia) Edvards Lucis	Nike
Liepāja	(Latvia) Artūrs Visockis-Rubenis	(Latvia) Roberts Freimanis	Nike
Valmiera Glass ViA	(Latvia) Nikolajs Mazurs	(Latvia) Edmunds Elksnis	Nike
VEF Rīga	(Latvia) Mārtiņš Gulbis	(Latvia) Dairis Bertāns	Adidas
Ventspils	(Latvia) Gints Fogels	(Latvia) Artūrs Ausējs	Joma
Rīgas Zeļļi	(Latvia) Juris Umbraško	(Latvia) Uģis Pinete	Nike

== Seeding ==
Pos	Team	Pld	W	L	PF	PA	PD	PCT	Qualification or relegation
1	(Latvia) VEF Rīga	28	25	3	2370	1956	+414	.893	Advance to semifinals
2	(Latvia) Rīgas Zeļļi	28	22	6	2347	1977	+370	.786	Advance to semifinals
3	(Latvia) BK Ogre	28	17	11	2294	2163	+131	.607	Advance to quarterfinals
4	(Latvia) Valmiera GLASS VIA	28	17	11	2319	2159	+160	.607	Advance to quarterfinals
5	(Latvia) BK Liepāja	28	15	13	2345	2290	+55	.536	Advance to quarterfinals
6	(Latvia) BK Ventspils	28	14	14	2492	2375	+117	.500	Advance to quarterfinals
7	(Latvia) Latvijas Universitāte	28	3	25	1954	2394	−440	.107	

Source: EstLatBL.com

== Play-off bracket ==
Quarter-finals
4	Valmiera Glass VIA	3
5	BK Liepāja	0
3	BK Ogre	1
6	BK Ventspils	3

Semi-finals
1	VEF Rīga	3
4	Valmiera Glass VIA	1
2	Rīgas Zeļļi	0
6	BK Ventspils	3

Finals
1	VEF Rīga	4
6	BK Ventspils	0
Third place
4	Valmiera Glass VIA	1
2	Rīgas Zeļļi	3

== Quarter-finals ==
The quarter-finals are best-of-five series.

=== Valmiera Glass ViA vs. BK Liepāja ===
5 April	Valmiera Glass/ViA	84–73 (Series: 1–0)	BK Liepāja	Valmiera
19:00	Scoring by quarter: 27-25, 11-19, 22-16, 24-13
	Pts: Kohs 23; Rebs: Spear 11; Asts: Spear 6 PIR: Kohs 23	Boxscore	Pts: Lasenbergs 17; Rebs: Freimanis 6 Asts: Lasenbergs 6 PIR: Lasenbergs 15	Arena: Valmiera Olympic Center; Attendance: 710

8 April	BK Liepāja	86–92(OT) (Series: 0–2)	Valmiera Glass/ViA	Liepāja
19:00	Scoring by quarter: 20-15, 22-20, 13-22, 21-19, Overtime: 10-16
	Pts: Dubults 25; Rebs: Dubults 12; Asts: Lasenbergs 10; PIR: Dubults 23	Boxscore	Pts: Kohs 23; Rebs: Kohs 8 Asts: Smith 8 PIR: Kohs 23	Arena: Liepāja Olympic Center; Attendance: 950

11 April	Valmiera Glass/ViA	87–84 (Series: 3–0)	BK Liepāja	Valmiera
19:00	Scoring by quarter: 25-19, 19-28, 28-16, 15-21
	Pts: Smith, Kohs 21; Rebs: Novitskyi 9 Asts: Smith 8 PIR: Kohs 23	Boxscore	Pts: Lasenbergs 26; Rebs: Dubults 15; Asts: Lasenbergs 5 PIR: Dubults 24	Arena: Valmiera Olympic Center; Attendance: 706

=== BK Ogre vs. BK Ventspils ===
16 April	BK Ogre	78–97 (Series: 0–1)	BK Ventspils	Ogre
19:00	Scoring by quarter: 14-25, 14-17, 18-23, 32-32
	Pts: Mediss 18; Rebs: Dārgais 15; Asts: Dārgais 7 PIR: Dārgais 22	Boxscore	Pts: Ausējs 20; Rebs: Randolph, Mežulis 7 Asts: Randolph, Ausējs, Censonis 4 PIR: Randolph 22	Arena: Sports arena Ogre; Attendance: 850

19 April	BK Ventspils	97–85 (Series: 2-0)	BK Ogre	Ventspils
17:00	Scoring by quarter: 34-21, 20-34, 26-23, 17-7
	Pts: Ausējs 23; Rebs: Zaķis 11; Asts: Randolph 8 PIR: Randolph 31	Boxscore	Pts: Dārgais 18; Rebs: Dārgais 15; Asts: Dārgais 6 PIR: Dārgais 39	Arena: Ventspils Olympic Center; Attendance: 1028

22 April	BK Ogre	98–91 (Series: 1-2)	BK Ventspils	Ogre
19:00	Scoring by quarter: 21-21, 30-21, 29-25, 18-24
	Pts: Rasnick 33; Rebs: Sīpoliņš 7 Asts: Žunda 3 PIR: Rasnick 29	Boxscore	Pts: Randolph 22; Rebs: Mežulis 10; Asts: Blomgren 5 PIR: Blomgren 22	Arena: Sports arena Ogre; Attendance: 639

25 April	BK Ventspils	91–80 (Series: 3-1)	BK Ogre	Ventspils
18:30	Scoring by quarter: 25-21, 25-21, 27-26, 14-12
	Pts: Blomgren 22; Rebs: Zaķis, Watson 8 Asts: Zaķis 5 PIR: Blomgren 23	Boxscore	Pts: Zēbergs 14; Rebs: Dārgais 15; Asts: Dārgais 7 PIR: Dārgais 28	Arena: Ventspils Olympic Center; Attendance: 869

== Semi-finals ==
The semi-finals are best-of-five series.

=== VEF Rīga vs. Valmiera Glass/VIA ===
25 April	VEF Rīga	97–81 (Series: 1–0)	Valmiera Glass/ViA	Rīga
20:00	Scoring by quarter: 16-24, 28-16, 34-16, 19-25
	Pts: Sanon 25; Rebs: Bobrov 7 Asts: Bobrov 7 PIR: Cleary 25	Boxscore	Pts: Kohs 19; Rebs: Novitskyi 11; Asts: Nuga 7 PIR: Kohs 21	Arena: Rimi Olympic Sports Centre; Attendance: 559

28 April	Valmiera Glass/ViA	80–73 (Series: 1-1)	VEF Rīga	Valmiera
19:00	Scoring by quarter: 15-27, 25-15, 20-18, 20-13
	Pts: Novitskyi 23; Rebs: Novitskyi 17; Asts: Smith 5 PIR: Novitskyi 33	Boxscore	Pts: Sanon 20; Rebs: Sanon 9 Asts: Sanon 8 PIR: Sanon 31	Arena: Valmiera Olympic Centre; Attendance: 687

1 May	VEF Rīga	110–95 (Series: 2-1)	Valmiera Glass/ViA	Valmiera
17:00	Scoring by quarter: 27-19, 23-28, 34-28, 26-20
	Pts: Sanon 26; Rebs: Bobrov 8 Asts: Cleary 11; PIR: Sanon 34	Boxscore	Pts: Kohs 22; Rebs: Smith 7 Asts: Smith 8 PIR: Ate, Novitskyi 24	Arena: Valmiera Olympic Centre; Attendance: 642

4 May	Valmiera Glass/ViA	84–108 (Series: 1-3)	VEF Rīga	Valmiera
19:00	Scoring by quarter: 28-21, 21-31, 23-25, 12-31
	Pts: Smith 23; Rebs: Ate 8 Asts: Karlsons, Smith 4 PIR: Smith 21	Boxscore	Pts: Sanon 26; Rebs: Bobrov 16; Asts: Sanon 9 PIR: Bobrov 39	Arena: Valmiera Olympic Centre; Attendance: 950

=== Rīgas Zeļļi vs. BK Ventspils ===
29 April	Rīgas Zeļļi	95–97 (Series: 0-1)	BK Ventspils	Rīga
20:00	Scoring by quarter: 27-23, 23-25, 18-28, 27-21
	Pts: Ford 22; Rebs: Raimo 6 Asts: Skuja 9 PIR: Ford 19	Boxscore	Pts: Randolph 25; Rebs: Watson 6 Asts: Blomgren 5 PIR: Randolph 23	Arena: Daugava Sports Hall; Attendance: 426

2 May	BK Ventspils	97–83 (Series: 2-0)	Rīgas Zeļļi	Ventspils
17:00	Scoring by quarter: 21-23, 32-28, 23-18, 21-14
	Pts: Randolph 24; Rebs: Randolph, Blomgren 7 Asts: Blomgren 6 PIR: Blomgren 24	Boxscore	Pts: Vīksne 18; Rebs: Ford 9 Asts: Skuja, Ford, Vīksne, Bērziņš 3 PIR: Helmanis 20	Arena: Ventspils Olympic Center; Attendance: 1583

5 May	Rīgas Zeļļi	84–94 (Series: 0-3)	BK Ventspils	Rīga
18:00	Scoring by quarter: 20-32, 23-18, 21-23, 20-21
	Pts: Ford 25; Rebs: Helmanis 11; Asts: Skuja 7 PIR: Helmanis 25	Boxscore	Pts: Randolph 21; Rebs: Ausējs 8 Asts: Randolph 7 PIR: Randolph 27	Arena: Daugava Sports Hall; Attendance: 576

== Bronze medal ==
The bronze medal series are best-of-five series.

=== Rīgas Zeļļi vs. Valmiera Glass ViA ===
14 May	Rīgas Zeļļi	83–97 (Series: 0-1)	Valmiera Glass/ViA	Rīga
19:00	Scoring by quarter: 14-23, 30-20, 15-27, 24-27
	Pts: Skuja 20; Rebs: Freimanis 11; Asts: Skuja 8 PIR: Freimanis 22	Boxscore	Pts: Smith 30; Rebs: Ate 12; Asts: Smith 10; PIR: Smith 33	Arena: Xiaomi Arena; Attendance: 2048

17 May	Valmiera Glass/ViA	79–85 (Series: 1-1)	Rīgas Zeļļi	Valmiera
19:00	Scoring by quarter: 8-21, 17-23, 29-14, 25-27
	Pts: Smith 26; Rebs: Smith 9 Asts: Smith 7 PIR: Smith 28	Boxscore	Pts: Ford 22; Rebs: Lācis 7 Asts: Skuja 9 PIR: Ford 19	Arena: Valmiera Olympic Center; Attendance: 745

20 May	Rīgas Zeļļi	83–62 (Series: 2-1)	Valmiera Glass/ViA	Rīga
20:00	Scoring by quarter: 18-20, 25-11, 15-20, 25-11
	Pts: Freimanis 16; Rebs: Lācis 10; Asts: Ford 8 PIR: Skuja, Lācis 17	Boxscore	Pts: Novitskyi 15; Rebs: Novitskyi 9 Asts: Smith 5 PIR: Novitskyi 20	Arena: Daugava Sports Hall; Attendance: 363

24 May	Valmiera Glass/ViA	68–109 (Series: 1-3)	Rīgas Zeļļi	Valmiera
19:00	Scoring by quarter: 16-28, 23-24, 21-28, 8-29
	Pts: Novitskyi 18; Rebs: Ate 5 Asts: Karlsons, Smith, Ate 3 PIR: Novitskyi, Ate 20	Boxscore	Pts: Freimanis 22; Rebs: Ford 7 Asts: Skuja 7 PIR: Bērziņš 25	Arena: Valmiera Olympic Center; Attendance: 710

== Final ==
The finals are best-of-seven series.

=== VEF Rīga vs. BK Ventspils ===
13 May	VEF Rīga	91–77 (Series: 1-0)	BK Ventspils	Rīga
18:30	Scoring by quarter: 23-23, 22-17, 18-24, 28-13
	Pts: Bobrov 31; Rebs: Bobrov 10; Asts: Sanon 11; PIR: Bobrov 39	Boxscore	Pts: Ausējs 17; Rebs: Zaķis 6 Asts: Ausējs 4 PIR: Zaķis 17	Arena: Rimi Olympic Center; Attendance: 478

17 May	BK Ventspils	106–114 (Series: 0-2)	VEF Rīga	Ventspils
16:30	Scoring by quarter: 24-16, 29-37, 23-26, 30-35
	Pts: Ausējs 29; Rebs: Watson 7 Asts: Blomgren 6 PIR: Ausējs 21	Boxscore	Pts: Bertāns 26; Rebs: Bobrov, Sanon 6 Asts: Sanon 11; PIR: Bertāns 26	Arena: Ventspils Olympic Center; Attendance: 1487

19 May	VEF Rīga	89–68 (Series: 3-0)	BK Ventspils	Rīga
18:30	Scoring by quarter: 23-16, 26-18, 22-9, 18-25
	Pts: Bertāns 18; Rebs: Bobrov 12; Asts: Būmeisters, Bertāns, Sanon 4 PIR: Bertāns 21	Boxscore	Pts: Randolph, Bērze 11; Rebs: Lekūnas 7 Asts: Randolph 6 PIR: Randolph 13	Arena: Rimi Olympic Center

22 May	BK Ventspils	91–93 (Series: 0-4)	VEF Rīga	Ventspils
18:30	Scoring by quarter: 29-23, 24-19, 20-32, 18-19
	Pts: Randolph 26; Rebs: Zaķis 7 Asts: Randolph 7 PIR: Randolph 33	Boxscore	Pts: Sanon 25; Rebs: Bobrov 12; Asts: Sanon 11; PIR: Sanon 30	Arena: Ventspils Olympic Center; Attendance: 716

== Final standings ==
Rank	Team	Record
1st place, gold medalist(s)	VEF Rīga	7-1
2nd place, silver medalist(s)	BK Ventspils	6-5
3rd place, bronze medalist(s)	Rīgas Zeļļi	3-4
4th	Valmiera Glass VIA	5-6
5th	BK Ogre	1–3
6th	BK Liepāja	0–3
7th	Latvijas Universitāte	
