= 2024–25 Latvian–Estonian Basketball League =

Optibet Latvian–Estonian Basketball League^{1}
- Season: 2024–25
- Duration: 20 September 2024 – 13 April 2025
- Games played: 213
- Teams: 15
- TV partners: Delfi TV, Inspira, TV4, Best4Sport TV

Regular season
- Season MVP: (Ukraine) Issuf Sanon

Finals
- Champions: (Latvia) VEF Rīga
- Runners-up: (Latvia) Rīgas Zeļļi
- Third place: (Estonia) BC Kalev/Cramo
- Fourth place: (Latvia) BK Ogre
- Finals MVP: (Ukraine) Vyacheslav Bobrov

Statistical leaders
Points	(United States) Javeon Jones	22.2
Rebounds	(Latvia) Kristaps Dārgais	10.6
Assists	(Estonia) Siim-Markus Post	8.0
Index Rating	(Ukraine) Artem Kovalov	25.5

Records
- Biggest home win: BC Kalev/Cramo 122–48 Keila KK (21 December 2024)
- Biggest away win: Keila Coolbet 60–111 BC Kalev/Cramo (2 February 2025)
- Highest scoring: Utilitas Rapla 110–104 BK Ventspils (5 November 2024)
- Winning streak: 14 games BC Kalev/Cramo
- Losing streak: 11 games Keila KK; Latvijas Universitāte
- Highest attendance: 5,972; VEF Rīga 88–82 Rīgas Zeļļi (13 April 2025)
- Lowest attendance: 50; BK Ogre 76–87 Pärnu Sadam (17 November 2024)

The 2024–25 Latvian–Estonian Basketball League, known as Optibet Latvian-Estonian Basketball League for sponsorship reasons, was the seventh season of the Latvian–Estonian Basketball League, the premier basketball competition for men's teams in Latvia and Estonia. VEF Rīga won its second championship.

== Teams ==
The number of participating teams was reduced from 16 to 15, due to BC Prometey and Tallinn Kalev/SNABB leaving the league. However, another team from Keila joined. There was also some interest from different Ukrainian and Israeli teams to participate.

=== Venues and locations ===
Location of teams in 2024–25 Latvian–Estonian Basketball League

Team	Home city	Arena	Capacity
(Estonia) BC Kalev/Cramo	Tallinn	Kalev Sports Hall	1,700
(Latvia) BK Liepāja	Liepāja	Liepāja Olympic Center	2,542
(Latvia) BK Ogre	Ogre	Arēna Ogre	1,700
(Latvia) BK Ventspils	Ventspils	Ventspils Olympic Center	3,085
(Estonia) Keila Coolbet	Keila	Keila Health Center	800
(Estonia) Keila KK	Keila	Keila Health Center	800
(Latvia) Latvijas Universitāte	Riga	Rimi Olympic Sports Center	830
(Estonia) Pärnu Sadam	Pärnu	Pärnu Sports Hall	1,820
(Latvia) Rīgas Zeļļi	Riga	Xiaomi Arena	11,200
(Latvia) Rīgas Zeļļi	Riga	Daugava Sports Hall	
(Estonia) TalTech/ALEXELA	Tallinn	TalTech Sports Hall	1,000
(Estonia) Tartu Ülikool Maks & Moorits	Tartu	University of Tartu Sports Hall	2,600
(Estonia) Utilitas Rapla	Rapla	Sadolin Sports Hall	958
(Latvia) Valmiera GLASS VIA	Valmiera	Valmiera Olympic Center	1,500
(Latvia) VEF Rīga	Riga	Rimi Olympic Sports Center	830
(Estonia) Viimsi	Haabneeme	Forus Sports Center	500

=== Personnel and sponsorship ===
Team	Head coach	Captain	Kit manufacturer	Shirt sponsor
(Estonia) BC Kalev/Cramo	(Estonia) Indrek Reinbok	(Estonia) Martin Dorbek	Nike	Cramo
(Latvia) BK Liepāja	(Latvia) Artūrs Visockis-Rubenis	(Latvia) Roberts Freimanis	Nike	Cleanr Grupa
(Latvia) BK Ogre	(Latvia) Uldis Švēde	(Latvia) Kristaps Dārgais	Nike	
(Latvia) BK Ventspils	(Latvia) Gints Fogels	(Latvia) Artūrs Ausējs	Joma	Kurekss
(Estonia) Keila Coolbet	(Estonia) Peep Pahv	(Estonia) Kaido Saks	Nike	Utilitas
(Estonia) Keila KK	(Estonia) Andres Sõber	(Estonia) Sven Kaldre	Nike	
(Latvia) Latvijas Universitāte	(Latvia) Gunārs Gailītis	(Latvia) Edvards Lucis	Nike	
(Estonia) Pärnu Sadam	(Estonia) Kristjan Evart	(Estonia) Ivo Van Tamm	Nike	Transcom
(Latvia) Rīgas Zeļļi	(Latvia) Juris Umbraško	(Latvia) Uģis Pinete	Nike	LVBet
(Estonia) TalTech/ALEXELA	(Estonia) Alar Varrak	(Estonia) Oliver Metsalu	Nike	Alexela
(Estonia) Tartu Ülikool Maks & Moorits	(Estonia) Aivar Kuusmaa	(Estonia) Martin Paasoja	Ballzy	Maks & Moorits
(Estonia) Utilitas Rapla	(Estonia) Brett Nõmm	(Estonia) Hendrik Eelmäe	Ballzy	Hepa
(Latvia) Valmiera GLASS VIA	(Latvia) Nikolajs Mazurs	(Latvia) Edmunds Elksnis	Nike	Vaks
(Latvia) VEF Rīga	(Latvia) Mārtiņš Gulbis	(Latvia) Dairis Bertāns	Adidas	Rīga
(Estonia) Viimsi	(Estonia) Valdo Lips	(Estonia) Aleksander Oliver Hint	Nike	Viimsi Keevitus

=== Coaching changes ===
Pre-season
Team	Outgoing coach	Incoming coach
(Estonia) Keila KK	(Estonia) Peep Pahv	(Estonia) Andres Sõber
(Estonia) Pärnu Sadam	(Estonia) Gert Kullamäe	(Ukraine) Vitaly Stepanovskyy
(Estonia) Tartu Ülikool Maks & Moorits	(Latvia) Gundars Vētra	(Estonia) Aivar Kuusmaa
(Latvia) VEF Rīga	(Latvia) Jānis Gailītis	(Latvia) Mārtiņš Gulbis
In-season
Team	Outgoing coach	Incoming coach
(Estonia) BC Kalev/Cramo	(Estonia) Heiko Rannula	(Estonia) Indrek Reinbok
(Estonia) Pärnu Sadam	(Ukraine) Vitaly Stepanovskyy	(Estonia) Kristjan Evart

== Regular season ==
=== League table ===
Pos	Team	Pld	W	L	PF	PA	PD	PCT	Qualification
1	(Latvia) VEF Rīga	28	25	3	2370	1956	+414	.893	Qualification to playoffs
2	(Estonia) BC Kalev/Cramo	28	24	4	2478	2079	+399	.857	Qualification to playoffs
3	(Latvia) Rīgas Zeļļi	28	22	6	2347	1977	+370	.786	Qualification to playoffs
4	(Latvia) BK Ogre	28	17	11	2294	2163	+131	.607	Qualification to playoffs
5	(Latvia) Valmiera GLASS VIA	28	17	11	2319	2159	+160	.607	Qualification to playoffs
6	(Estonia) Tartu Ülikool Maks & Moorits	28	17	11	2301	2270	+31	.607	Qualification to playoffs
7	(Latvia) BK Liepāja	28	15	13	2345	2290	+55	.536	Qualification to playoffs
8	(Latvia) BK Ventspils	28	14	14	2492	2375	+117	.500	Qualification to playoffs
9	(Estonia) TalTech/ALEXELA	28	14	14	2259	2326	−67	.500	
10	(Estonia) Utilitas Rapla	28	14	14	2312	2288	+24	.500	
11	(Estonia) Pärnu Sadam	28	11	17	2273	2385	−112	.393	
12	(Estonia) Keila Coolbet	28	8	20	2149	2378	−229	.286	
13	(Estonia) Viimsi	28	5	23	2019	2407	−388	.179	
14	(Estonia) Keila KK	28	4	24	2068	2533	−465	.143	
15	(Latvia) Latvijas Universitāte	28	3	25	1954	2394	−440	.107	

Source: EstLatBL.com

=== Results ===
Home \ Away	KAL	BKL	OGR	BKV	KCB	KEI	LAT	PAR	ZEL	TCH	TRT	RAP	VAL	VEF	VMS
BC Kalev/Cramo	—	90–74	87–80	89–81	86–56	122–48	81–76	103–78	79–67	79–78	79–84	82–77	84–83	63–84	99–61
BK Liepāja	88–92	—	80–75	79–98	90–75	83–82	78–71	98–84	78–82	97–92	63–66	81–99	76–63	89–80	87–54
BK Ogre	69–95	91–96	—	95–75	85–82	99–91	90–74	76–87	76–72	86–66	79–86	71–57	87–67	59–81	93–80
BK Ventspils	85–93	101–81	81–95	—	93–68	116–78	90–70	95–92	85–84	96–86	92–93	90–76	91–95	84–89	106–57
Keila Coolbet	60–111	77–78	80–75	82–75	—	83–72	83–75	96–98	60–84	79–86	81–102	80–77	85–90	80–89	75–72
Keila KK	60–93	90–77	83–96	71–77	84–79	—	89–78	68–98	42–89	66–77	63–90	63–86	71–94	78–90	85–77
Latvijas Universitāte	65–75	56–95	65–97	87–89	71–69	77–68	—	80–97	66–83	66–75	84–82	70–91	72–92	59–78	84–94
Pärnu Sadam	62–75	81–91	57–92	100–90	72–87	91–82	77–53	—	51–87	77–74	87–90	78–80	83–78	83–96	74–80
Rīgas Zeļļi	84–70	90–80	88–71	79–78	87–80	102–84	87–59	89–76	—	82–62	79–65	73–58	72–61	91–88	100–71
TalTech/ALEXELA	75–109	100–97	72–70	93–87	86–82	101–88	97–51	71–94	76–113	—	67–84	85–81	92–84	80–93	86–66
Tartu Ülikool Maks & Moorits	81–85	81–80	66–68	82–99	96–66	89–85	88–74	94–91	77–71	76–103	—	90–84	69–84	67–93	84–81
Utilitas Rapla	75–87	99–111	76–84	110–104	87–83	100–73	79–60	113–76	66–96	93–91	92–80	—	91–86	71–86	82–64
Valmiera GLASS VIA	78–76	80–63	88–92	91–77	93–89	90–54	98–67	102–79	68–91	78–48	89–87	80–65	—	61–68	79–49
VEF Rīga	85–96	74–58	78–73	71–63	94–55	94–71	85–67	75–70	80–59	82–52	74–71	84–62	92–73	—	89–52
Viimsi	85–98	67–97	53–70	89–94	70–77	85–79	87–77	70–80	70–66	70–88	77–81	80–85	89–94	69–98	—

Source: EstLatBL.com
Legend: Blue = home team win; Red = away team win.
Matches with lighter background shading were decided after overtime.

== Playoffs ==
=== Quarterfinals ===
Team 1	Agg.	Team 2	1st leg	2nd leg	3rd leg
VEF Rīga (Latvia)	2–1	(Latvia) BK Ventspils	97–84	78–85	87–74
BC Kalev/Cramo (Estonia)	2–0	(Latvia) BK Liepāja	86–76	82–81	
Rīgas Zeļļi (Latvia)	2–1	(Estonia) Tartu Ülikool Maks & Moorits	86–58	84–92	78–72
BK Ogre (Latvia)	2–0	(Latvia) Valmiera GLASS VIA	83–75	77–76	

==== VEF Rīga vs. BK Ventspils ====
25 March 2025	VEF Rīga (Latvia)	97–84 (Series: 1–0)	(Latvia) BK Ventspils	Riga
18:30 (GMT)	Scoring by quarter: 20–28, 31–18, 21–20, 25–18
	Pts: Bertāns 24; Rebs: three players 5 Asts: Cleary 6 PIR: Bertāns, Bobrov 27	Boxscore	Pts: Randolph 13; Rebs: Mežulis 7 Asts: Randolph 6 PIR: Randolph 19	Arena: Rimi Olympic Center; Attendance: 712; Referees: R. Helmsteins, H. Laas, R. Repelis

28 March 2025	BK Ventspils (Latvia)	85–78 (Series: 1–1)	(Latvia) VEF Rīga	Ventspils
19:00 (GMT)	Scoring by quarter: 22–17, 21–22, 22–18, 20–21
	Pts: Randolph Jr 23; Rebs: Randolph Jr 7 Asts: Randolph Jr 4	Box Score	Pts: Sanon 23; Rebs: Lawrence 8 Asts: Sanon 4	Arena: Ventspils Olympic Center; Attendance: 1574; Referees: G. Saliņš, M. Uuehendrik, I. Kitsing

30 March 2025	VEF Rīga (Latvia)	87–74 (Series: 2–1)	(Latvia) BK Ventspils	Riga
16:00 (GMT)	Scoring by quarter: 23–17, 24–26, 22–16, 18–15
	Pts: Sanon 22; Rebs: Bobrov 7 Asts: Sydorov 7	Box Score	Pts: Randolph Jr, Lekūnas 15; Rebs: Zaķis 10; Asts: Blomgren 4	Arena: Rimi Olympic Center; Attendance: 834; Referees: M. Kozlovskis, G. Salins, M. Männiste

==== BC Kalev/Cramo vs. BK Liepāja ====
21 March 2025	BC Kalev/Cramo (Estonia)	86–76 (Series: 1–0)	(Latvia) BK Liepāja	Tallinn
19:00 (GMT)	Scoring by quarter: 27–18, 15–21, 20–17, 24–20
	Pts: Vaaks 21; Rebs: Vaaks, Kuuba 6 Asts: Vaaks 5	Box Score	Pts: Ķilps 17; Rebs: Dubults 9 Asts: Lasenbergs 4	Arena: Kalev Sports Hall; Attendance: 827; Referees: R. Peerandi, E. Tukiss, J. Bruveris

25 March 2025	BK Liepāja (Latvia)	81–82 (Series: 0–2)	(Estonia) BC Kalev/Cramo	Liepāja
19:00 (GMT)	Scoring by quarter: 15–23, 24–17, 24–16, 18–26
	Pts: Ķilps 28; Rebs: Mačoha 8 Asts: Ķilps 4	Box Score	Pts: Vaaks 24; Rebs: Tapé 7 Asts: Kaukiainen 8	Arena: Liepāja Olympic Center; Attendance: 825; Referees: R. Varv, E. Binders-Coders, E. Tserr

==== Rīgas Zeļļi vs. Tartu Ülikool Maks & Moorits ====
22 March 2025	Rīgas Zeļļi (Latvia)	86–58 (Series: 1-0)	(Estonia) Tartu Ülikool Maks & Moorits	Riga
20:00 (GMT)	Scoring by quarter: 16-10, 27-6, 24-23, 19-19
	Pts: Lācis 14; Rebs: Ford III 10; Asts: Skuja 7	Box Score	Pts: Henry 15; Rebs: Henry 10; Asts: Flood 4	Arena: Daugava Sports Hall; Attendance: 523; Referees: A.Aunkrogers, M.Manniste, R.Konks

26 March 2025	Tartu Ülikool Maks & Moorits (Estonia)	92–84 (Series: 1–1)	(Latvia) Rīgas Zeļļi	Tartu
19:00 (GMT)	Scoring by quarter: 23–21, 29–29, 16–17, 24–17
	Pts: Henry 24; Rebs: El-Sheikh 10; Asts: Paasoja 5	Box Score	Pts: Helmanis 22; Rebs: Helmanis,Ford III 6 Asts: Skuja 5	Arena: University of Tartu Sports Hall; Referees: A. Halliko, R. Misirovs, V. Voskis

29 March 2025	Rīgas Zeļļi (Latvia)	78–73 (Series: 2–1)	(Estonia) Tartu Ülikool Maks & Moorits	Riga
18:00 (GMT)	Scoring by quarter: 21–19, 22–19, 12–14, 23–21
	Pts: Skuja 19; Rebs: Helmanis, Freimanis 9 Asts: Skuja 5	Box Score	Pts: Flood 28; Rebs: El-Sheikh 13; Asts: Paasoja 5	Arena: Daugava Sports Hall; Attendance: 414; Referees: O. Latiševs, M. Männiste, R. Värv

==== BK Ogre vs. Valmiera GLASS VIA ====
22 March 2025	BK Ogre (Latvia)	83–75 (Series: 1–0)	(Latvia) Valmiera GLASS VIA	Ogre
17:00 (GMT)
	Pts: Mediss, Žunda 18; Rebs: Dārgais 13; Asts: Dārgais 8	Box Score	Pts: Spear 26; Rebs: Spear 9 Asts: Smith 4	Arena: Arēna Ogre; Attendance: 1,231; Referees: O. Latiševs, M. Kozlovskis, E. Tiidor

26 March 2025	Valmiera GLASS VIA (Latvia)	76–77 (Series: 0–2)	(Latvia) BK Ogre	Valmiera
19:00 (GMT)
	Pts: Smith 22; Rebs: Spear 8 Asts: Spear 5	Box Score		Arena: Vidzeme Olympic Center; Attendance: 815; Referees: R. Värv, J. Rozenbergs, H. Laas

=== Semifinals ===
Team 1	Agg.	Team 2	1st leg	2nd leg	3rd leg
VEF Rīga (Latvia)	2–0	(Latvia) BK Ogre	80–63	89–82	
BC Kalev/Cramo (Estonia)	1–2	(Latvia) Rīgas Zeļļi	87–80	83–97	71–78

==== VEF Rīga vs. BK Ogre ====
3 April 2025	VEF Rīga (Latvia)	80–63 (Series: 1–0)	(Latvia) BK Ogre	Riga
20:00 (GMT)	Scoring by quarter: 24–13, 20–27, 14–14, 22–9
	Pts: Cleary 20; Rebs: Lawrence 9 Asts: Sydorov 7	Box Score	Pts: Rasnick 14; Rebs: Dārgais 13; Asts: Rasnick 5	Arena: Rimi Olympic Center; Attendance: 654; Referees: E. Tukiss, I. Kitsing, R. Misirovs

6 April 2025	BK Ogre (Latvia)	82–89 (Series: 0–2)	(Latvia) VEF Rīga	Ogre
17:00 (GMT)	Scoring by quarter: 21–21, 20–25, 19–18, 22–25
	Pts: Dārgais 14; Rebs: Dārgais 6 Asts: Dārgais 7	Box Score	Pts: Sanon 23; Rebs: Lawrence 7 Asts: Bertāns 4	Arena: Arēna Ogre; Attendance: 1500; Referees: M.Manniste, J.Rozenbergs, H.Laas

==== BC Kalev/Cramo vs. Rīgas Zeļļi ====
2 April 2025	BC Kalev/Cramo (Estonia)	87–80 (Series: 1–0)	(Latvia) Rīgas Zeļļi	Tallinn
19:00 (GMT)	Scoring by quarter: 19–16, 19–22, 28–23, 21–19
	Pts: Vaaks 23; Rebs: Vaaks, Kuuba 5 Asts: Kaukiainen 7	Box Score	Pts: Helmanis 20; Rebs: Helmanis 8 Asts: Ford III 8	Arena: Nord Sports Hall; Attendance: 914; Referees: A. Halliko, R. Helmsteins, M. Senkevics

5 April 2025	Rīgas Zeļļi (Latvia)	97–83 (Series: 1–1)	(Estonia) BC Kalev/Cramo	Riga
19:00 (GMT)	Scoring by quarter: 18–17, 24–22, 29–15, 26–29
	Pts: Skuja 20; Rebs: Freimanis, Viksne 6 Asts: Berzins 5	Box Score	Pts: Vaaks 22; Rebs: Kuuba, Miška 6 Asts: Kaukiainen	Arena: Daugava Sports Hall; Attendance: 707; Referees: A. Aunkrogers, M. Männiste, H. Laas

8 April 2025	BC Kalev/Cramo (Estonia)	71–78 (Series: 1–2)	(Latvia) Rīgas Zeļļi	Tallinn
19:00 (GMT)	Scoring by quarter: 24–21, 27–16, 10–20, 10–21
	Pts: Kaukiainen 18; Rebs: Vaaks 7 Asts: Dorbek 7	Box Score	Pts: Helmanis 17; Rebs: Helmanis 8 Asts: Skuja 9	Arena: Nord Sports Hall; Attendance: 1,074; Referees: R.Peerandi, R.Helmšteins, R.Misirovs

=== Bronze medal game ===
==== BC Kalev/Cramo vs. BK Ogre ====
11 April 2025	BC Kalev/Cramo (Estonia)	92–69	(Latvia) BK Ogre	Tallinn
19:00 (GMT)	Scoring by quarter: 32–18, 26–17, 16-18, 18–16
	Pts: Vaaks 18; Rebs: Tapé, Hermet 6 Asts: Vaaks 6	Box Score	Pts: Žunda 19; Rebs: Dārgais 9 Asts: Rasnick, Kampuss 3	Arena: Nord Sports Hall; Attendance: 522; Referees: A.Halliko, J.Rozenbergs, E.Bnders-Čoders

=== Final ===
==== BK VEF Rīga vs. Rīgas Zeļļi ====
13 April 2025	VEF Rīga (Latvia)	88–82	(Latvia) Rīgas Zeļļi	Rīga
17:00 (GMT)	Scoring by quarter: 26-20, 20-19, 27-23, 15-20
	Pts: Sanon 20; Rebs: Lawrence 8 Asts: Sanon 5	Box Score	Pts: Helmanis, Ford 18; Rebs: Ford 9 Asts: Ford 8	Arena: Xiaomi Arena; Attendance: 5972; Referees: M.Kozlovskis, G.Saliņš, R.Varv

== Bracket ==
Quarter-finals
1	(Latvia) VEF Rīga	2
8	(Latvia) BK Ventspils	1
4	(Latvia) BK Ogre	2
5	(Latvia) Valmiera GLASS VIA	0
2	(Estonia) BC Kalev/Cramo	2
7	(Latvia) BK Liepāja	0
3	(Latvia) Rīgas Zeļļi	2
6	(Estonia) Tartu Ülikool Maks & Moorits	1

Semi-finals
1	(Latvia) VEF Rīga	2
4	(Latvia) BK Ogre	0
2	(Estonia) BC Kalev/Cramo	1
3	(Latvia) Rīgas Zeļļi	2

Finals
1	(Latvia) VEF Rīga	88
3	(Latvia) Rīgas Zeļļi	82
Third place
2	(Estonia) Kalev/Cramo	92
4	(Latvia) BK Ogre	69

== Attendances to arenas ==
=== Average attendances ===
Pos	Team	Total	High	Low	Average
1	Rīgas Zeļļi	17,253	3,839	252	1,014
2	Valmiera GLASS VIA	13,066	1,354	602	871
3	VEF Rīga	14,969	5,972	150	831
4	BK Ventspils	11,604	1,574	482	773
5	Tartu Ülikool Maks & Moorits	11,538	2,113	421	769
6	BC Kalev/Cramo	12,134	1,162	331	674
7	Pärnu Sadam	9,279	1,718	304	662
8	BK Ogre	9,627	1,500	50	601
9	TalTech/ALEXELA	8,423	1,709	282	601
10	BK Liepāja	7,250	1,050	450	486
11	Utilitas Rapla	5,454	547	296	389
12	Keila Coolbet	4,496	700	202	321
13	Viimsi	4,288	406	164	306
14	Keila KK	3,647	689	128	260
15	Latvijas Universitāte	3,085	580	103	220
	League total	136,153	5,972	50	599

Source: EstLatBL.com

== Awards ==
=== MVP of the Month ===
Month	Player	Team	Ref.
2024
October	(Ukraine) Artem Kovalov	(Estonia) Keila Coolbet	
November	(United States) Kahliel Spear	(Latvia) Valmiera GLASS VIA	
December	(Latvia) Kristaps Dārgais	(Latvia) BK Ogre	
2025
January	(Finland) Okko Järvi	(Estonia) Pärnu Sadam	
February	(Latvia) Artūrs Ausējs	(Latvia) BK Ventspils	

=== Regular season MVP ===
Player	Club	Ref.
(Ukraine) Issuf Sanon	(Latvia) VEF Rīga	

=== Finals MVP ===
Player	Club	Ref.
(Ukraine) Vyacheslav Bobrov	(Latvia) VEF Rīga	

=== All-Star Five ===
Pos.	Player	Team
PG	(Ukraine) Issuf Sanon	(Latvia) VEF Rīga
SG	(Estonia) Stefan Vaaks	(Estonia) BC Kalev/Cramo
SF	(Ukraine) Vyacheslav Bobrov	(Latvia) VEF Rīga
PF	(Latvia) Kristaps Dārgais	(Latvia) BK Ogre
C	(Latvia) Krišs Helmanis	(Latvia) Rīgas Zeļļi

== Statistics ==
=== Points ===
Rank	Name	Team	PPG
1.	(United States) Javeon Jones	(Estonia) Keila KK	22.18
2.	(Latvia) Artūrs Ausējs	(Latvia) BK Ventspils	19.41
3.	(United States) Jalyn McCreary	(Estonia) UTILITAS RAPLA	19.00
4.	(Ukraine) Artem Kovalov	(Estonia) Keila Coolbet	18.50
5.	(United States) Kahliel Spear	(Latvia) Valmiera GLASS VIA	17.26

=== Rebounds ===
Rank	Name	Team	RPG
1.	(Latvia) Kristaps Dārgais	(Latvia) BK Ogre	10.61
2.	(Ukraine) Artem Kovalov	(Estonia) Keila Coolbet	10.55
3.	(Egypt) Omar El-Sheikh	(Estonia) Tartu Ülikool Maks & Moorits	10.03
4.	(Austria) Bryce Douvier	(Estonia) Pärnu Sadam	9.60
5.	(United States) Kahliel Spear	(Latvia) Valmiera GLASS VIA	9.48

=== Assists ===
Rank	Name	Team	APG
1.	(Estonia) Siim-Markus Post	(Estonia) TalTech	8.04
2.	(United States) Javeon Jones	(Estonia) Keila KK	6.18
3.	(Latvia) Toms Skuja	(Latvia) Rīgas Zeļļi	5.76
4.	(Estonia) Patrik Peemot	(Estonia) Keila KK	4.92
5.	(Finland) Severi Kaukiainen	(Estonia) BC Kalev/Cramo	4.90

== Clubs in European competitions ==
FIBA competitions
Team	Competition	Progress
(Latvia) VEF Rīga	Champions League	Regular season
(Estonia) BC Kalev/Cramo	Champions League	Qualifying
(Estonia) BC Kalev/Cramo	FIBA Europe Cup	Second round
(Estonia) Pärnu Sadam	FIBA Europe Cup	Regular season

Regional competitions
Team	Competition	Progress
(Estonia) Keila Coolbet	European North Basketball League	Regular season
(Estonia) Tartu Ülikool Maks & Moorits	European North Basketball League	Regular season
(Latvia) Valmiera GLASS VIA	European North Basketball League	Quarterfinals

== See also ==
- 2025 KML Playoffs
