= 2026 LBL Play-offs =

Latvian national championships in basketball

LBL Play-offs
- Season: 2026
- Dates: 11 April – 15 May
- Teams: 6
- TV partners: TV4; Sportacentrs TV; Best4SportTV

Regular season
- Season MVP: (New Zealand) Aniwaniwa Tait-Jones

Finals
- Champions: Valmiera Glass ViA
- Runners-up: BK Ventspils
- Third place: Rīgas Zeļļi
- Fourth place: VEF Rīga

The 2026 LBL Play-offs is the tournament to determine the Latvian Basketball League champions for the 2025–26 season. All participating teams spent the regular season in Latvian-Estonian Basketball League, with the top six Latvian teams advancing to the LBL play-offs. The play-offs began on 11 April.

== Format ==
Seven Latvian teams participated in 2025–26 Latvian–Estonian Basketball League regular season, determining seeding for the play-offs, as six of them qualified for the play-offs. Top two teams qualified for semi-finals, but other four teams started the play-off with quarterfinal series. Quarterfinal and series are played in the best-of-five format, bronze medal series are played in best-of-three format, but for the first time since 1994 the final is played in the best-of-five series.

== Teams ==
=== Venues and locations ===
Location of teams in 2026 LBL Play-offs

| Team | Home city | Arena | Capacity |
|---|---|---|---|
| BK Ogre | Ogre | Sports Arena Ogre | 1700 |
| Latvijas Universitāte | Rīga | O. Kalpaka RTDP | 258 |
| Liepāja | Liepāja | Liepāja Olympic Center | 2542 |
| Valmiera Glass ViA | Valmiera | Vidzeme Olympic Center | 1500 |
| VEF Rīga | Rīga | OSC | 830 |
| Ventspils | Ventspils | Ventspils Olympic Center | 3085 |
| Rīgas Zeļļi | Rīga | Daugava Sports House | 500 |

=== Personnel and sponsorship ===
| Team | Head coach | Captain | Kit manufacturer |
|---|---|---|---|
| BK Ogre | (Latvia) Uldis Švēde | (Latvia) Kristaps Dārgais | Nike |
| Latvijas Universitāte | (Latvia) Marts Ozolinkevičs | (Latvia) Edvards Lucis | Nike |
| Liepāja | (Latvia) Artūrs Visockis-Rubenis | (Latvia) Emīls Krūmiņš | Nike |
| Valmiera Glass ViA | (Latvia) Kaspars Vecvagars | (Latvia) Artis Ate | Nike |
| VEF Rīga | (Latvia) Mārtiņš Gulbis | (Latvia) Dairis Bertāns | Adidas |
| Ventspils | (Latvia) Gints Fogels | (Latvia) Artūrs Ausējs | Joma |
| Rīgas Zeļļi | (Latvia) Dāvis Čoders | (Latvia) Uģis Pinete | Nike |

== Seeding ==
| Pos | Team | Pld | W | L | PF | PA | PD | PCT | Qualification or relegation |
|---|---|---|---|---|---|---|---|---|---|
| 1 | (Latvia) VEF Rīga | 26 | 21 | 5 | 2334 | 2025 | +309 | .808 | Advance to semifinals |
| 2 | (Latvia) Valmiera GLASS VIA | 26 | 20 | 6 | 2422 | 2102 | +320 | .769 | Advance to semifinals |
| 3 | (Latvia) Rīgas Zeļļi | 26 | 20 | 6 | 2374 | 2072 | +302 | .769 | Advance to quarterfinals |
| 4 | (Latvia) BK Ventspils | 21 | 17 | 4 | 2348 | 2199 | +149 | .810 | Advance to quarterfinals |
| 5 | (Latvia) BK Ogre | 26 | 11 | 15 | 2149 | 2126 | +23 | .423 | Advance to quarterfinals |
| 6 | (Latvia) BK Liepāja | 26 | 5 | 21 | 2085 | 2294 | −209 | .192 | Advance to quarterfinals |
| 7 | (Latvia) Latvijas Universitāte | 26 | 4 | 22 | 2132 | 2536 | −404 | .154 | |

Source: EstLatBL.com

== Play-off bracket ==
| source = lbl.basket.lv

Quarter-finals
4 | BK Ventspils | 3
5 | BK Ogre | 0
3 | Rīgas Zeļļi | 3
6 | BK Liepāja | 0

Semi-finals
1 | VEF Rīga | 2
4 | BK Ventspils | 3
2 | Valmiera Glass VIA | 3
3 | Rīgas Zeļļi | 2

Finals
4 | BK Ventspils | 1
2 | Valmiera Glass VIA | 3
Third place
1 | VEF Rīga | 1
3 | Rīgas Zeļļi | 2

== Final standings ==
| Rank | Team | Record |
|---|---|---|
| 1st place, gold medalist(s) | Valmiera Glass VIA | 6-3 |
| 2nd place, silver medalist(s) | BK Ventspils | 7-5 |
| 3rd place, bronze medalist(s) | Rīgas Zeļļi | 7-4 |
| 4th | VEF Rīga | 3-5 |
| 5th | BK Ogre | 0–3 |
| 6th | BK Liepāja | 0–3 |
| 7th | Latvijas Universitāte | - |
