= Dāvis Čoders =

Latvian basketball player and coach

Valmiera Glass Via
- Title: Head coach
- League: LEBL; LBL

Personal information
- Born: 13 March 1992 (age 34) Ventspils, Latvia
- Listed height: 6 ft 2 in (1.88 m)
- Listed weight: 176 lb (80 kg)

Career information
- Playing career: 2010–2015
- Position: Point guard
- Coaching career: 2015–present

Career history

Playing
- 2010–2011: BK Ventspils
- 2011–2013: Jūrmala/Fēnikss
- 2013–2014: Barons
- 2014–2015: Jūrmala/Fēnikss

Coaching
- 2015–2017: BK Ventspils (assistant)
- 2017–2023: VEF Rīga (assistant)
- 2023–2026: Rīgas Zeļļi (assistant)
- 2026: Rīgas Zeļļi
- 2026-present: Valmiera Glass Via

Career highlights
- As an assistant coach: 5x Latvian league champion (2019–2023); 2x Latvian Cup champion (2022–2023); Latvian-Estonian League champion (2022)

Dāvis Čoders (born 13 March 1992) is a Latvian former professional basketball player and a current coach. He is the head coach of Valmiera Glass Via.

Standing at 6 ft 2 in (1.88 m), he played at the point guard position. He grew up in BK Ventspils system and played for the first team during 2010–11 season. Later he played for couple other teams and enden his career in 2015. Čoders and the Latvian national team secured third place in the 2010 European U-18 Championship. Čoders has represented the Latvian national youth team in several competitions, including 2011 FIBA Under-19 World Championship.

== Coaching career ==
In 2015 Čoders started his coaching career and became assistant for BK Ventspils head coach Kārlis Muižnieks. Two years later he joined Latvian powerhouse VEF Rīga to become assistant for Jānis Gailītis.

In 2023 Čoders joined newly founded Rīgas Zeļļi to be assistant for Juris Umbraško. On February 23, 2026, after Umbraško was fired, Čoders became the head coach for Rīgas Zeļļi.

In 2025 and 2026 Čoders was also one of the Sito Alonso assistants in Latvia national team. After just four games, Alonso resigned, and Čoders was no longer on the Latvian national team's coaching staff.
