= Jaquan Lawrence =

American basketball player (born 1999)

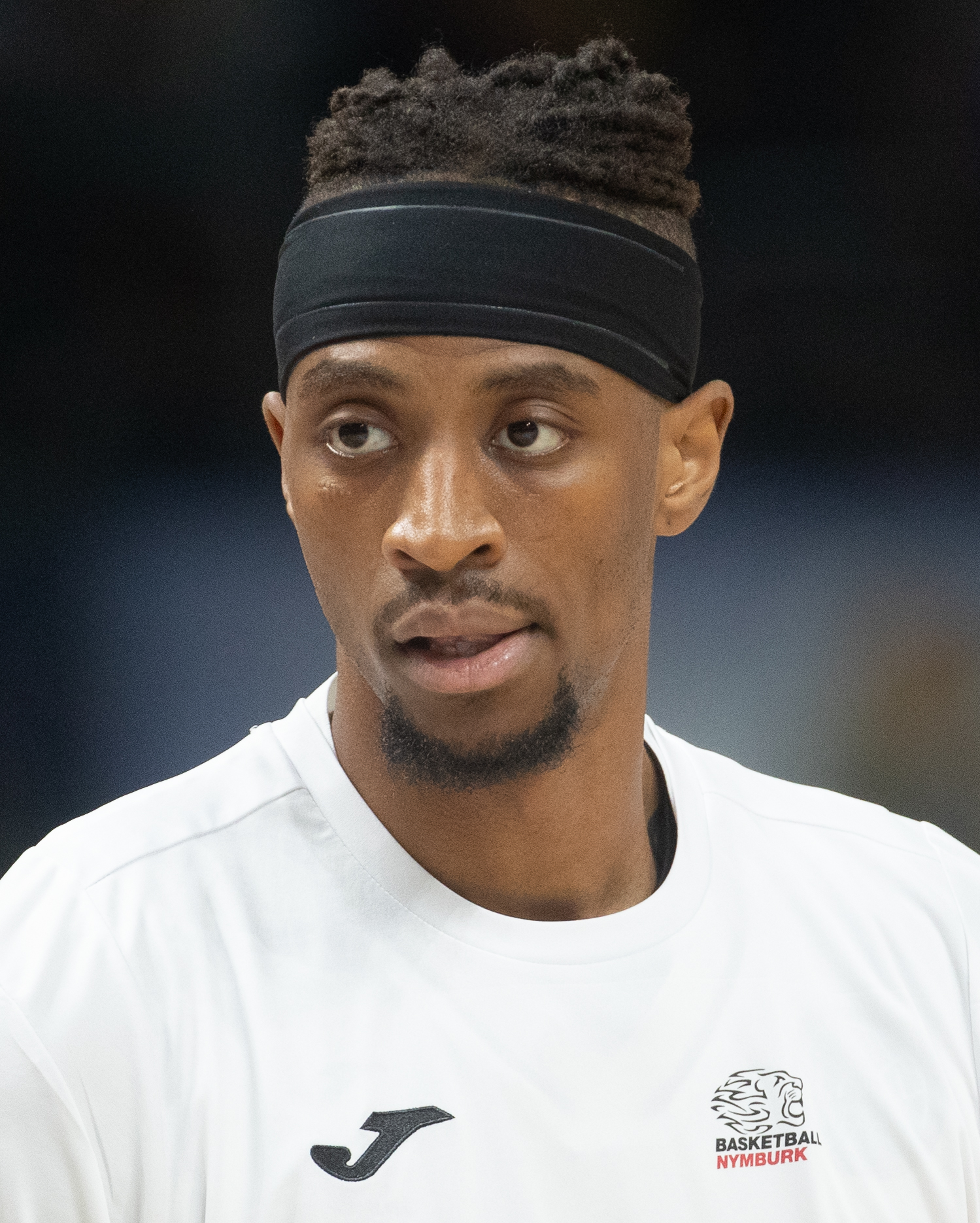
- Lawrence in 2025

No. 40 – AMW Arka Gdynia
- Position: Center
- League: PLK

Personal information
- Born: 10 August 1999 (age 27) Chicago, Illinois, U.S.
- Listed height: 2.06 m (6 ft 9 in)
- Listed weight: 90 kg (198 lb)

Career information
- High school: Perspectives Charter (Chicago, Illinois)
- College: LeMoyne–Owen (2017–2022)
- NBA draft: 2022: undrafted
- Playing career: 2022–present

Career history
- 2022–2023: Tampereen Pyrintö
- 2023–2024: Traiskirchen Lions
- 2024–2025: VEF Rīga
- 2025–2026: ERA Nymburk
- 2026–present: Arka Gdynia

Career highlights
- LBL champion (2025); Latvian-Estonian League champion (2025); Latvian Cup winner (2025); SIAC Defensive Player of the Year (2022); SIAC All-Second Team (2022)

Jaquan Lawrence (born 10 August 1999) is an American professional basketball player for Arka Gdynia of the Polish Basketball League (PLK).

== Professional career ==
After graduating, Lawrence started his pro career in Finland, playing for Tampereen Pyrintö and in the summer of 2023 he signed for Traiskirchen Lions in Austrian Basketball Superliga.

On July 23, 2024, he signed for VEF Rīga in Latvian-Estonian Basketball League.

On July 30, 2025, he signed with ERA Nymburk of the National Basketball League.

On August 10, 2026, he signed with Arka Gdynia of the Polish Basketball League (PLK).

== Personal life ==
Lawrence's personal NBA Mount Rushmore is: Anthony Davis, Kevin Durant, Lebron James, D- Rose. His coach in college was a long-time NBA player Bonzi Wells.
