= Harrison Cleary =

American basketball player (born 1997)

CS Rapid București
- Position: Point guard / shooting guard

Personal information
- Born: December 8, 1997 (age 28) Oak Creek, Wisconsin, U.S.
- Listed height: 1.85 m (6 ft 1 in)
- Listed weight: 82 kg (181 lb)

Career information
- High school: Oak Creek (Oak Creek, Wisconsin)
- College: Minnesota Crookston (2016–2020)
- NBA draft: 2020: undrafted
- Playing career: 2020–present

Career history
- 2020: AB Castelló
- 2021: CB Almansa
- 2021-2022: CB Carbajosa
- 2022-2023: SC Rist Wedel
- 2023: →Hamburg Towers
- 2023-2024: Lahti Basketball
- 2024–2025: VEF Rīga
- 2025–2026: Neptūnas Klaipėda
- 2026–present: CS Rapid București

Career highlights
- LBL champion (2025); Latvian-Estonian League champion (2025); Latvian Cup winner (2025); 3x NSIC All-First Team (2018, 2019, 2020); 2x NABC All-District Central Second Team (2019, 2020); NSIC Freshman of the Year (2017); NSIC All-Second Team (2017)

Harrison Cleary (born December 8, 1997) is an American professional basketball player, currently playing for CS Rapid București of the Liga Națională in Romania.

== College ==
During college career at University of Minnesota Crookston in NCAA II, Cleary proved himself a scorer, averaging 23.7 points per game. He recorded a career high on December 14, 2019, scoring 52 points in a win against Wayne State Wildcats.

== Professional career ==
On July 2024, he signed for Lahti Basketball in Korisliiga.

On August 6, 2024, Cleary signed with VEF Rīga of the Latvian-Estonian Basketball League.

On July 26, 2025, he signed a one-year contract with Neptūnas Klaipėda of the Lithuanian Basketball League (LKL) and the EuroCup. In August 2026, Cleary put pen to paper on a contract with CS Rapid București of the Romanian Liga Națională.

== Personal life ==
Harrison is the son of Michael and Kathleen Cleary. He majored in sports and rec management. His dad is his idol off the court, and his idol on the court is Kobe Bryant.

== Career statistics ==
Legend
GP	Games played	GS	Games started	MPG	Minutes per game
FG%	Field-goal percentage	3P%	3-point field-goal percentage	FT%	Free-throw percentage
RPG	Rebounds per game	APG	Assists per game	SPG	Steals per game
BPG	Blocks per game	PPG	Points per game	PIR	Performance index rating
**Bold**	Career high

=== EuroCup ===
Year	Team	GP	GS	MPG	FG%	3P%	FT%	RPG	APG	SPG	BPG	PPG	PIR
2022–23	Hamburg Towers	8	0	12.3	**.439**	.263	**1**	**1.1**	**1.3**	**.5**	**.0**	6.3	**4.3**
2025–26	Neptūnas Klaipėda	**18**	**5**	**15.1**	.388	**.393**	.955	.6	1.2	.2	**.0**	**6.6**	2.6
Career		26	5	14.2	.403	.360	.968	.7	1.2	.3	.0	6.5	3.1
