= Verners Kohs =

Latvian basketball player (born 1997)

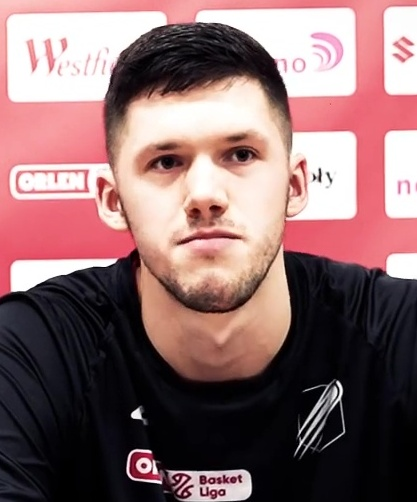

No. 12 – Valmiera Glass ViA
- Position: Power forward
- League: Latvian-Estonian Basketball League

Personal information
- Born: 21 May 1997 (age 29) Ventspils, Latvia
- Listed height: 2.06 m (6 ft 9 in)
- Listed weight: 94 kg (207 lb)

Career information
- Playing career: 2012–present

Career history
- 2014–2015: VEF Rīga
- 2015–2016: CAI Zaragoza
- 2016–2017: GBA Prague
- 2017–2019: Obradoiro CAB
- 2017–2018: → Ourense
- 2019–2021: VEF Rīga
- 2021–2022: BK Liepāja
- 2022–2023: Vanoli Cremona
- 2023: Heroes Den Bosch
- 2023–2024: Czarni Słupsk
- 2024–present: Valmiera Glass VIA

Career highlights
- Latvian Cup winner (2026); 4× Latvian League champion (2019, 2020, 2021, 2026)

Verners Edgards Kohs (born 21 May 1997) is a Latvian professional basketball player for Valmiera Glass VIA of the Latvian-Estonian Basketball League. Standing at 2.06 m (6 ft 9 in), he plays as power forward. He is a three-time Latvian League champion with VEF Riga.

== Professional career ==
Kohs came through the youth ranks of BK Ventspils, before joining VEF Rīga in 2013. He made his debut for VEF's senior team during the 2014–15 season.

In January 2015, Kohs moved to Belgium, joining BC Oostende for a try-out, followed by a year in Spain, in which he mostly saw action for El Olivar Zaragoza in the LEB Silver, while appearing in one game for Liga ACB outfit CAI Zaragoza.

He moved to Prague in 2016, joining the Get Better Academy which competes in the country's second tier. In July 2017, he was signed by Obradoiro CAB of the Spanish Liga ACB and was then sent to LEB Oro side Club Ourense Baloncesto on loan.

On 25 January 2022 he signed with Vanoli Cremona of the Italian Lega Basket Serie A (LBA).

On 8 September 2022 Kohs signed a one-year contract for Heroes Den Bosch of the BNXT League.

On September 20, 2023, he signed with Czarni Słupsk of the Polish Basketball League.

== International career ==
Representing Latvia, Kohs played at the 2013 under-16-, the 2015 under-18- and the 2016 under-20-European Championships.
