= Klāvs Čavars =

Latvian basketball player (born 1996)

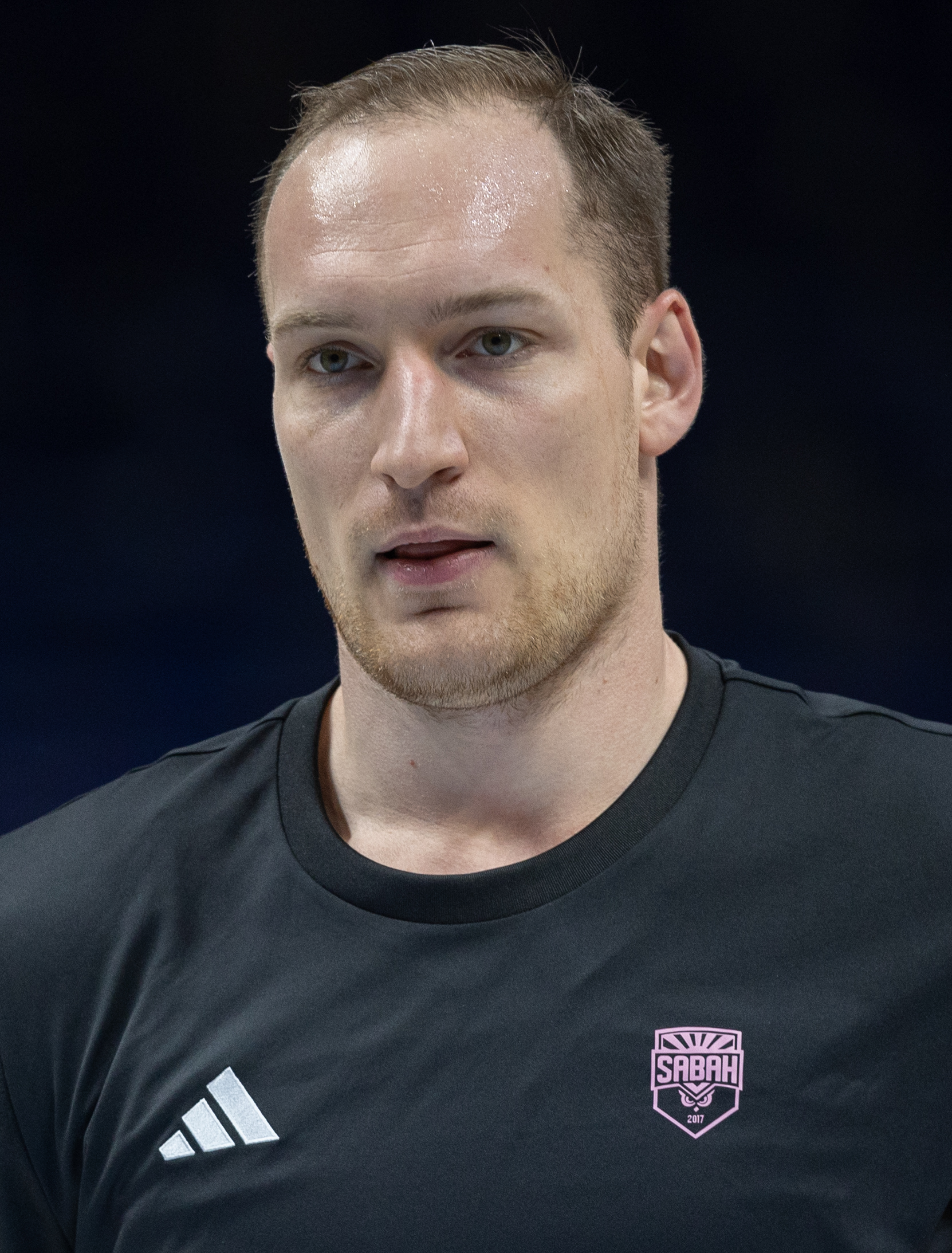
- Čavars with Sabah in 2025

No. 15 – Rīgas Zeļļi
- Position: Center
- League: LEBL

Personal information
- Born: February 11, 1996 (age 30) Ventspils, Latvia
- Listed height: 2.08 m (6 ft 10 in)
- Listed weight: 115 kg (254 lb)

Career information
- NBA draft: 2018: undrafted

Career history
- 2012–2014: VEF Rīga
- 2012–2014: LMT Basketbola Akademija
- 2015–2016: BK Liepāja
- 2016–2017: İTÜ B.K.
- 2017–2018: VEF Rīga
- 2019–2020: BK Ventspils
- 2020–2021: BC Tsmoki-Minsk
- 2021–2022: Astoria Bydgoszcz
- 2022–2023: Start Lublin
- 2023–2024: Yokohama Excellence
- 2024–2026: Sabah
- 2026–present: Rīgas Zeļļi

Klāvs Čavars (born February 11, 1996) is a Latvian professional basketball player for Rīgas Zeļļi of the Latvian–Estonian Basketball League (LEBL). The 2.08 m (6'10") center played six seasons for VEF Rīga.

== Professional career ==
=== VEF Rīga ===
Čavars first joined the VEF Rīga and played in the 2012–13 season. Although loaned to other teams, Čavars played a total of six seasons for VEF Rīga. Čavars' career high was during the 2013–14 season, playing 4 games and averaging 9.0 points and 9.5 rebounds. During the 2018–19 season, Cavars finished with 23 games played and averaged 2.5 points, 0.2 assists and 2.2 rebounds. This was his second career low with the team after the 2018–19 season finishing with an average of 6.6 points, 5.2 rebounds and 0.9 assists.

=== BK Liepājas Lauvas ===
Čavars played one season for the BK Liepājas Lauvas. During the 2015–16 season he played in both the Latvian Basketball League and Baltic Basketball League, in a total of 54 combined games (42 in LBL, 12 in BBL).

=== BK Ventspils ===
Čavars played for the BK Ventspils during the 2019–20 season. He played for 20 minutes in 20 games and averaged 11.3 points, 7.4 rebounds and 1.8 assists per game.

=== Tsmoki-Minsk ===
On June 10, 2020, he has signed with Tsmoki-Minsk of the VTB United League.

=== Astoria Bydgoszcz ===
On July 23, 2021, he has signed with Astoria Bydgoszcz of the PLK.

=== Start Lublin ===
On July 23, 2022, he has signed with Start Lublin of the PLK.

=== Yokohama Excellence ===
On July 4, 2023, it was announced that Čavars had signed with Yokohama Excellence which at the time of the announcement was in the third division of the Japanese B.League.

=== Sabah BC ===
On August 31, 2024, he signed with Sabah BC of the Azerbaijan Basketball League.

On November 7, 2024, Čavars set a FIBA Europe Cup single-game record for most blocks in a game, when he had 8 blocks in a loss against Maroussi.

== National team career ==
Čavars represented the Latvia men's national basketball team in the 2023 FIBA Basketball World Cup. Latvia finished the tournament in fifth place.
