= Rīgas Zeļļi =

Latvian basketball team

- Nickname: Zeļļi
- Leagues: Latvian–Estonian Basketball League; Latvian Basketball League; EuroCup
- Founded: 2023
- Arena: Komandu Sporta Spēļu Halle (Team Sports Games Hall); Xiaomi Arena
- Capacity: 3,000; 11,200
- Location: Riga, Latvia
- Team colors: Pink, blue
- President: Edgars Buļs
- General manager: FE20FF
- Head coach: Rokas Kondratavičius
- Website: rigaszelli.lv
Home	Away

Rīgas Zeļļi is a professional basketball team based in Riga, Latvia. It was founded in the summer of 2023 and currently competes in Latvian-Estonian Basketball League and EuroCup.

== History ==
News of the planned team began appearing in April 2023 with Kristaps Janičenoks voicing support for their inclusion in the Latvian-Estonian Basketball League. The team was intended as a privately financed club with key sponsors including Riga Technical University, Betsafe, Sportland, Dienas Bizness, Sporta Avīze, and Cēsu pilsētas sporta skola identified.

On July 13, 2023, it was announced that a new team named Rīgas Zeļļi will take part in Latvian-Estonian Basketball League, Latvian Basketball League and Latvian Basketball Cup. Its president is sports manager Edgars Buļs and former player Artūrs Šēnhofs is taking the role of a general manager. Previously, both worked together as hosts of a basketball show "Ūdenszeļļi" on television.

Club offers everyone to become its member by donating money, in return having a word in teams' decisions. It has also created a mobile app for a team to communicate with teams' management. It presents itself as the most innovative sports organizations in Latvia.

On July 14, 2023, it was announced that the head coach of the team will be Juris Umbraško.

On September 19, Andris Biedriņš, the first Latvian basketball player ever drafted in the NBA, joined the club as its ambassador.

On September 30, 2023, Zeļļi played the first official game in a team's history beating Keila Coolbet in Arena Riga.

The first foreign player signed by Zeļļi was Georgian forward George Natsvlishvili. After the start of debut season Rīgas Zeļļi signed an American point guard Nigel Johnson. Later he was replaced by Canadian shooting guard Isiah Osborne.

On January 20, 2024, Rīgas Zeļļi announced that the team was joined by Aleksandrs Samoilovs, a two-time European silver medalist in Beach volleyball. It was meant to be a marketing campaign and he actually played in only one game, scoring two points against KK Viimsi.

On February 29, 2024, Rīgas Zeļļi signed a long-standing center of the Latvian national team Mārtiņš Meiers until the end of the season. 10 days later team also signed Australian center Jordan Hunter.

On August 2, 2025, Rīgas Zeļļi has officially announced its participation in the upcoming season of the European North Basketball League. Club president Edgars Buļs emphasized that European North Basketball League offers a guaranteed number of games, which is crucial for player development and fan engagement. The decision reflects the club’s long-term vision and ambition to grow on the European stage. Starting with the 2025–26 season, Rīgas Zeļļi will play their home games at the newly built Komandu Sporta Spēļu Halle (Team Sports Games Hall) in Riga. The hall can accommodate up to 3,000 spectators. The club also announced that its budget could reach up to €1 million, the highest in its history.

On October of 2025 it became known that the club's front office member Reinis Lacis has joined the Philadelphia 76ers as a scout.

== Season by season ==
Season	League	Regional	Europe	Latvian Cup	Head coach
2023-24	Latvian League; Runner-up	Latvian–Estonian League; 6th Place	did not participate	Latvian Cup; Runner-up	Juris Umbraško
2024-25	Latvian League; Bronze	Latvian–Estonian League; Runner-up	did not participate	Latvian Cup; Semifinal	Juris Umbraško
2025-26	Latvian League; Bronze	Latvian–Estonian League; 5th Place	ENBL; Quarterfinals	Latvian Cup; Semifinal	Juris Umbraško/Dāvis Čoders

== Players ==
=== Current roster ===
Rīgas Zeļļi roster
Players
Coaches

Pos.	No.	Nat.	Name	Ht.	Wt.	Age
PG	1	(United States)	Tony Perkins	1.93 m (6 ft 4 in)	93 kg (205 lb)	24 – 4 December 2001
PG	2	(United States)	Ben Shungu	1.88 m (6 ft 2 in)	91 kg (201 lb)	29 – 4 October 1997
PG	3	(Latvia)	Toms Skuja	1.90 m (6 ft 3 in)	85 kg (187 lb)	24 – 2 January 2002
PF	5	(United States)	Tyler Wahl	2.06 m (6 ft 9 in)	102 kg (225 lb)	25 – 7 March 2001
G	6	(Latvia)	Gustavs Kampuss	1.86 m (6 ft 1 in)	90 kg (198 lb)	27 – 26 October 1999
G	10	(Latvia)	Rolands Šulcs	1.90 m (6 ft 3 in)	93 kg (205 lb)	20 – 6 January 2006
PF	11	(Latvia)	Kristians Feierbergs	2.03 m (6 ft 8 in)	99 kg (218 lb)	24 – 26 August 2002
F	12	(Latvia)	Kristers Ķikusts	2.02 m (6 ft 8 in)	92 kg (203 lb)	19 – 26 September 2007
SF	13	(Lithuania)	Martynas Varnas	1.96 m (6 ft 5 in)	90 kg (198 lb)	29 – 21 January 1997
C	15	(Latvia)	Klāvs Čavars	2.08 m (6 ft 10 in)	115 kg (254 lb)	30 – 11 February 1996
F	20	(Latvia)	Ritvars Nikolajevs	2.02 m (6 ft 8 in)	90 kg (198 lb)	19 – 10 July 2007
SF	22	(Latvia)	Tomas Talcis	2.00 m (6 ft 7 in)	93 kg (205 lb)	19 – 22 September 2007
F	31	(Latvia)	Jānis Bērziņš	2.01 m (6 ft 7 in)	96 kg (212 lb)	33 – 4 May 1993
C	33	(United States)	Isaac Johnson	2.13 m (7 ft 0 in)	109 kg (240 lb)	26 – 23 July 2000
G/F	55	(Ukraine)	Ivan Tkachenko	1.97 m (6 ft 6 in)	90 kg (198 lb)	29 – 23 April 1997

Head coach

- (Lithuania) Rokas Kondratavičius

Assistant coach(es)

- (Latvia) Akselis Vairogs
- (Latvia) Raimonds Feldmanis

Legend

- (C) Team captain
- Injured

- Roster
Updated: September 10, 2026

=== Depth chart ===
Pos.	Starting 5	Bench 1	Bench 2
C	Klāvs Čavars	Isaac Johnson	Kristers Ķikusts
PF	Tyler Wahl	Kristians Feierbergs	Ritvars Nikolajevs
SF	Jānis Bērziņš	Ivan Tkachenko	Tomas Talcis
SG	Rolands Šulcs	Martynas Varnas	Gustavs Kampuss
PG	Toms Skuja	Ben Shungu	Tony Perkins

=== Squad changes for the 2026–27 season ===
==== In ====
Note: Flags indicate national team, as has been defined under FIBA eligibility rules. Players may hold more than one non-FIBA nationality.

No.	Pos.	Nat.	Player
11	PF	(Latvia) LAT	Kristians Feierbergs (from (Latvia) BK Liepāja)
12	SF	(Latvia) LAT	Kristers Ķikusts (from (Latvia) 2 Gulbenes Buki/BJSS)
13	SF	(Lithuania) LTU	Martynas Varnas (without club)
3	PG	(Latvia) LAT	Toms Skuja (from (Germany) Riesen Ludwigsburg)
1	PG	(United States) USA	Tony Perkins (from (Czech Republic) Nymburk)
5	PF	(United States) USA	Tyler Wahl (from (Poland) KK Włocławek)
6	SG	(Latvia) LAT	Gustavs Kampuss (from (Latvia) BK Ogre)
22	SF	(Latvia) LAT	Tomas Talcis (rented from (Spain) Valencia Basket U18)
33	C	(United States) USA	Isaac Johnson (from (NCAA) Hawaii Rainbow Warriors)
11	PG	(United States) USA	Ben Shungu (from (Poland) Miasto Szkła Krosno)
15	C	(Latvia) LAT	Klāvs Čavars (from (Azerbaijan) Sabah BC)
55	SF	(Ukraine) UKR	Ivan Tkachenko (from (Croatia) KK Zadar)

==== Out ====
Note: Flags indicate national team, as has been defined under FIBA eligibility rules. Players may hold more than one non-FIBA nationality.

No.	Pos.	Nat.	Player
15	SF	(Latvia) LAT	Uģis Pinete (career end)
1	PG	(Latvia) LAT	Juris Vītols (to (Latvia) BK Ogre)
8	SG	(Latvia) LAT	Roberts Bērziņš (to (Iceland) KR)
7	PF	(Latvia) LAT	Rodijs Mačoha (to (Latvia) BK Liepāja)
23	SF	(United States) USA	Frankie Fidler (to (Azerbaijan) Sabah BC)
0	PG	(United States) USA	Khalil Shabazz (free agent)
5	PG	(Ukraine) UKR	Denys Lukashov (free agent)
33	C	(United States) USA	Christian Anigwe (free agent)
55	C	(Ukraine) UKR	Denis Krestinin (free agent)

* Left/joined the team during the season

=== Historical rosters ===
2025–26 season roster
Pos.	Starting 5	Bench 1	Bench 2	Left team during season
C	(Latvia) #33 Christian Anigwe	(Lithuania) #55 Denis Krestinin		
PF	(Latvia) #7 Rodijs Mačoha	(Latvia) #31 Jānis Bērziņš		(United States) #5 Frank Champion
SF	(United States) #23 Frankie Fidler	(Latvia) #15 Uģis Pinete C	(Latvia) #20 Ritvars Nikolajevs	(Latvia) #37 Dāvids Vīksne
SG	(Latvia) #8 Roberts Bērziņš	(Latvia) #10 Rolands Šulcs	(Latvia) #9 Raivo Kudrjavcevs	(United States) #14 Mike Adewunmi
PG	(United States) #0 Khalil Shabazz	(Ukraine) #5 Denys Lukashov	(Latvia) #1 Juris Vītols	(Latvia) #3 Toms Skuja (United States) #2 JP Peagues (United States) #11 Jackie Johnson III

2024–25 season roster
Pos.	Starting 5	Bench 1	Bench 2
C	(Latvia) #7 Krišs Helmanis	(Latvia) #24 Rolands Freimanis	
PF	(Latvia) #14 Zigmārs Raimo	(Latvia) #22 Francis Lācis	(Latvia) #12 Kristers Skrinda
SF	(Latvia) #32 Dāvids Vīksne	(Latvia) #15 Uģis Pinete C	(Latvia) #17 Dans Galdiņš
SG	(Latvia) #8 Roberts Bērziņš	(Latvia) #10 Rolands Šulcs	
PG	(Latvia) #3 Toms Skuja	(United States) #20 Robert Ford III	(Latvia) #1 Juris Vītols

== Coaches ==
- (Lithuania) Rokas Kondratavicius 2026–present
- (Latvia) Dāvis Čoders 2026
- (Latvia) Juris Umbraško 2023–2026

== Honours ==
- Latvian League:
  - Runners-up (1): 2024
  - Bronze (2): 2025; 2026
- Latvian Cup:
  - Runners-up (1): 2024
- Latvian–Estonian League
  - Runners-up (1): 2025
