= Krišs Helmanis =

Latvian basketball player

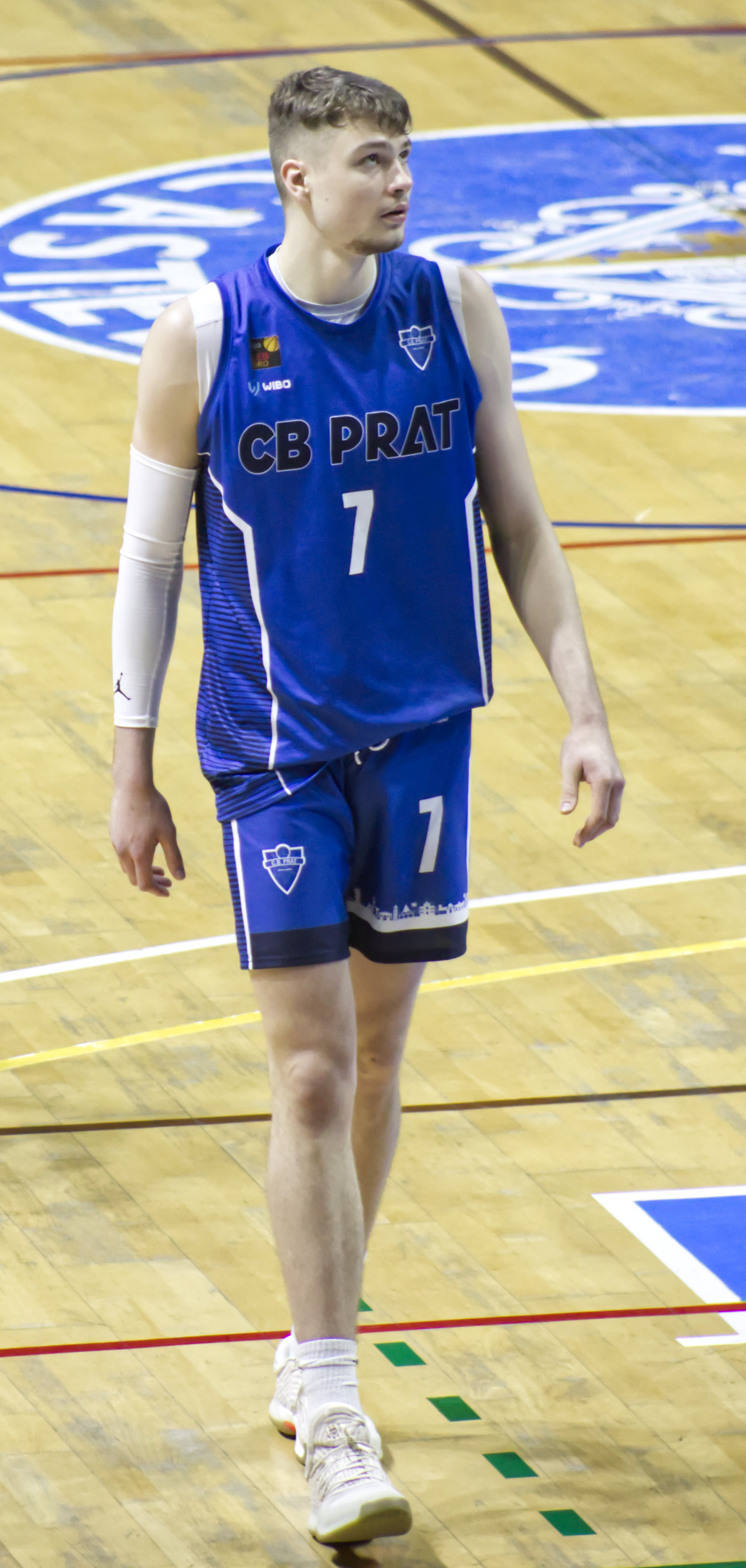
- Helmanis in 2022

No. 7 – Boca Juniors
- Position: Center
- League: Liga Nacional de Básquetbol

Personal information
- Born: April 7, 2002 (age 24) Leverkusen, Germany
- Listed height: 6 ft 11 in (2.11 m)
- Listed weight: 215 lb (98 kg)

Career information
- Playing career: 2018–present

Career history
- 2018–2022: Joventut Badalona
- 2018–2022: →CB Prat
- 2022–2024: Tigers Tübingen
- 2024–2025: Rīgas Zeļļi
- 2025–2026: Diablos Rojos del México
- 2026–present: Boca Juniors

Krišs Helmanis (born April 7, 2002) is a Latvian professional basketball player who currently plays for the Boca Juniors. He plays at center position.

== Professional career ==
During his youth, he trained and played in the DSN (Daugava Sports Hall) system of the Riga Basketball School (Basketbola skola "Rīga") in the Latvian Youth Basketball League (LJBL), where his coach was Raivo Otersons, who was also Andris Biedriņš' first coach.

In 2018, Krišs moved to Spain to join the youth system of Joventut Badalona, initially alongside another DSN player, Roberts Bērziņš. At the senior level, he played for CB Prat in Spain's third and second divisions. He made a single appearance in the Liga ACB with Joventut Badalona on September 26, 2021, playing 28 seconds against Saski Baskonia.

In 2022, Helmanis moved to Germany and represented the Tübingen Tigers for two seasons. First season Helmanis played in the second division ProA, and then in the Basketball Bundesliga during the 2023–2024 season. In the Bundesliga season, he averaged 5.7 points and 4.9 rebounds per game, appearing in 27 games.

In the summer of 2024, Helmanis joined Rīgas Zeļļi, a club competing in the Latvian–Estonian Basketball League and the Latvijas Basketbola līga.

== National team career ==
Helmanis represented various Latvian youth national teams, including the one which participated in 2021 FIBA Under-19 Basketball World Cup.

He made his debut for Latvia men's national basketball team on 24 February 2023, playing half a minute in the game against Turkey.

== Personal life ==
Krišs is the son of former Latvian national team basketball player and now a coach Uvis Helmanis. His brother, Kārlis Helmanis, was also a basketball player, while his mother, Rūta, is the foster mother of a basketball player Artūrs Žagars. Krišs was born in Germany, where his father was playing for a professional club Bayer Giants Leverkusen at the time.
