= Dairis Bertāns =

Latvian basketball player (born 1989)

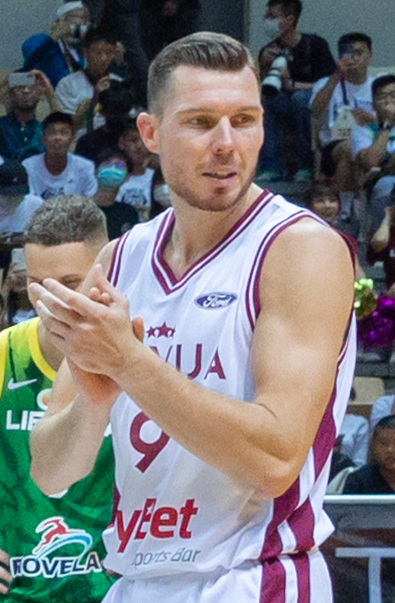
- Bertāns with Latvia in 2023

Personal information
- Born: 9 September 1989 (age 37) Valmiera, Latvian SSR, Soviet Union
- Listed height: 6 ft 4 in (1.93 m)
- Listed weight: 200 lb (91 kg)

Career information
- NBA draft: 2011: undrafted
- Playing career: 2004–2026
- Position: Shooting guard

Career history
- 2004–2006: Valmiera
- 2006–2009: ASK Rīga
- 2009–2010: Ventspils
- 2010–2013: VEF Rīga
- 2013–2016: Bilbao
- 2016–2017: Darüşşafaka
- 2017–2019: Olimpia Milano
- 2019: New Orleans Pelicans
- 2019–2021: Khimki
- 2021–2023: Real Betis
- 2023–2026: VEF Rīga

Career highlights
- Italian League champion (2018); 2× Italian Supercup winner (2017, 2018); Latvian–Estonian League champion (2025); 6× Latvian League champion (2009, 2011–2013, 2024, 2025); Latvian League Finals MVP (2025); 2× Latvian Cup winner (2024, 2025)
- Stats at NBA.com
- Stats at Basketball Reference
Medals
Men's basketball
Representing Latvia
European U-18 Championship
Bronze medal – third place	2007 Spain	U-18

Dairis Bertāns (born 9 September 1989) is a Latvian former professional basketball player and manager. Bertāns also played for the Latvia national team. He played the shooting guard position. He is the older brother of Dāvis Bertāns.

== Professional career ==
=== Latvia (2004–2013) ===
From 2004 to 2006, Bertāns played for Valmiera and its junior team. In 2006, he signed with ASK Rīga. In 2006–07, he played for ASK Rīga's junior team, and in 2007–08, he made his debut for the senior squad.

In March 2009, he left ASK Rīga following the club's financial difficulties and signed a two-year deal with Ventspils.

In August 2010, he signed a two-year deal with VEF Rīga. VEF Rīga's coach at the time, Rimas Kurtinaitis, saw potential in Bertāns as a point guard despite primarily being a shooting guard. So, during the 2010–11 season, Bertāns developed point guard skills to a different level, and was one of the key factors in VEF Rīga's first championship.

In July 2012, he re-signed with VEF Rīga on a three-year deal.

=== Bilbao Basket (2013–2016) ===
In June 2013, Bertāns parted ways with VEF Rīga to sign a three-year deal with Bilbao Basket of the Liga ACB. In one of his first games with Bilbao, he scored 19 points in a preseason game against the Philadelphia 76ers of the NBA.

In July 2014, Bertāns joined the Boston Celtics for the 2014 NBA Summer League.

In his second season with Bilbao, Bertāns helped the team to reach the 2015 ACB Playoffs as the fifth seed, but they eventually lost to Valencia in the quarter-finals.

In July 2015, Bertāns joined the San Antonio Spurs for the 2015 NBA Summer League. He averaged 11.3 points, 3 rebounds and 1.6 in three games played for the Spurs.

On 20 January 2016, Bertāns recorded a season-high 27 points, shooting 6-of-11 from three-point range, along with four rebounds and two assists in a 76–78 loss to Bayern Munich.

=== Darüşşafaka (2016–2017) ===
On 13 July 2016, Bertāns signed a 1+1-year deal with Turkish club Darüşşafaka Doğuş under head coach David Blatt. On 12 January 2017, Bertāns recorded a career-high 29 points, shooting 10-of-13 from the field, along with five assists in a 98–89 win over Baskonia. Bertāns helped the team to reach the 2017 EuroLeague Playoffs as the eighth seed, but they eventually were eliminated by Real Madrid in the quarterfinals.

=== Olimpia Milano (2017–2019) ===
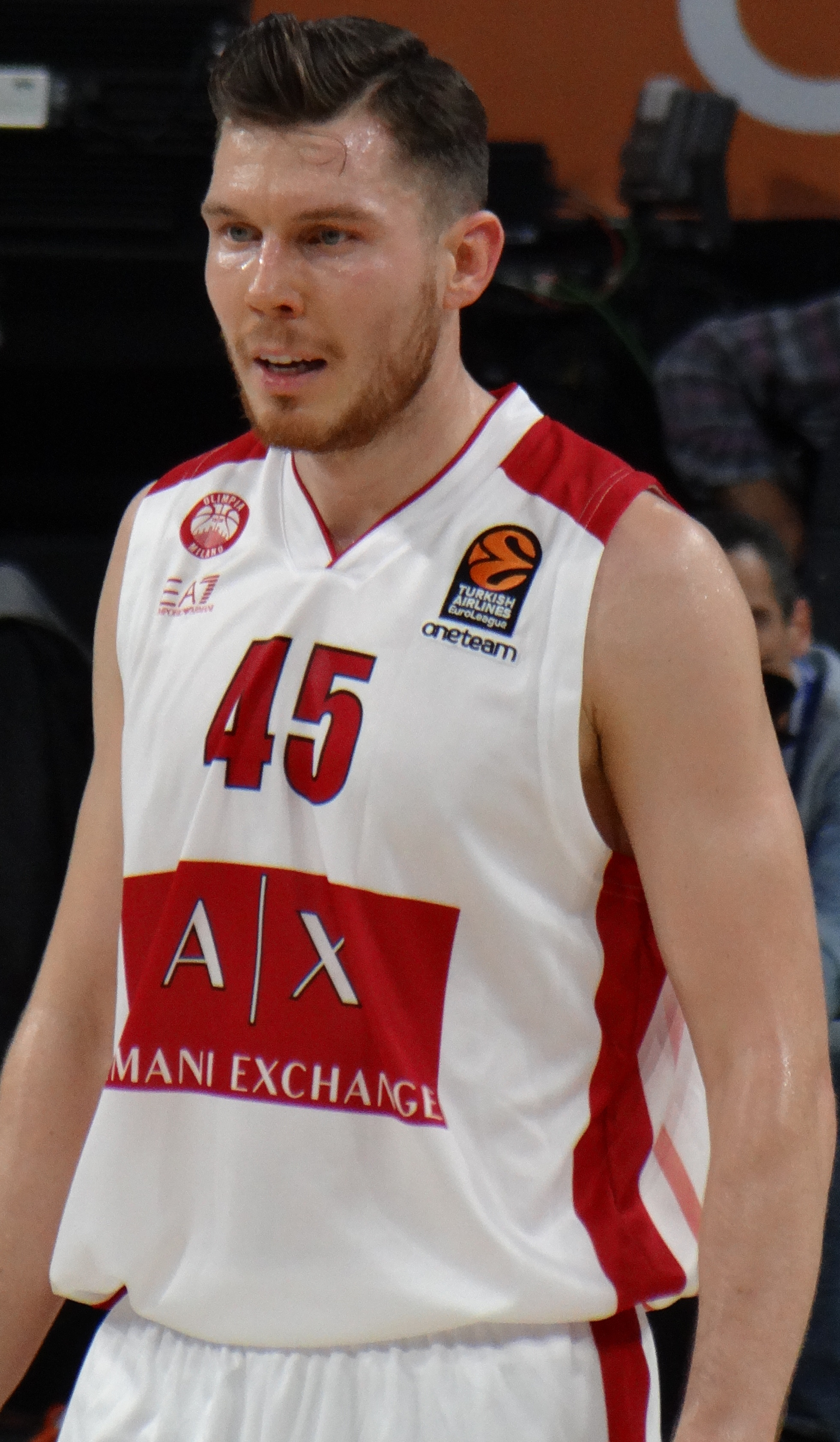
Bertāns with Olimpia Milano in November 2017

On 10 July 2017, Bertāns signed with Italian club Olimpia Milano. In his first season with Milano, Bertāns helped Milano to win the 2018 Italian League championship.

On 29 June 2018, Bertāns re-signed with Milano for the 2018–19 season. However, on 1 March 2019, Bertāns parted ways with Milano so he can continue the season in the NBA.

=== New Orleans Pelicans (2019) ===
On 2 March 2019, Bertāns signed with the New Orleans Pelicans. Bertāns later made his NBA debut eight days later, recording just one assist in six minutes of action in a 128–116 loss to the Atlanta Hawks. He then recorded a rebound two days later in a 130–113 loss to the Milwaukee Bucks. Bertāns made his first basket with a three-pointer in a 138–136 overtime loss to the Phoenix Suns on 16 March. On 7 July 2019, he was waived by the Pelicans.

=== Khimki (2019–2021) ===
On 8 July 2019, Bertāns signed a two-year contract with Khimki, reuniting with head coach Rimas Kurtinaitis. He played in 21 out of 28 Euroleague games and BC Khimki won 13 games, placing them 7th place in the standings, which would qualify the team to playoffs. On 25 May 2020, Euroleague Basketball cancelled its competitions due to the COVID-19 pandemic.

=== Real Betis (2021–2023) ===
On 27 July 2021, Bertāns signed with Real Betis of the Liga ACB.

=== Return to VEF Rīga (2023–2026) ===
On 14 July 2023, it was announced that after ten years away from home, Bertāns had returned to VEF Rīga, signing a two-year contract.

== Career statistics ==
Legend
GP	Games played	GS	Games started	MPG	Minutes per game
FG%	Field-goal percentage	3P%	3-point field-goal percentage	FT%	Free-throw percentage
RPG	Rebounds per game	APG	Assists per game	SPG	Steals per game
BPG	Blocks per game	PPG	Points per game	PIR	Performance index rating
**Bold**	Career high

=== NBA ===
==== Regular season ====
Year	Team	GP	GS	MPG	FG%	3P%	FT%	RPG	APG	SPG	BPG	PPG
2018–19	New Orleans	12	0	13.9	.255	.294	–	.8	.8	.1	.0	2.8
Career		12	0	13.9	.255	.294	–	.8	.8	.1	.0	2.8

=== EuroLeague ===
*	Led the league

Year	Team	GP	GS	MPG	FG%	3P%	FT%	RPG	APG	SPG	BPG	PPG	PIR
2016–17	Darüşşafaka	**32**	7	16.1	.463	.500	.836	.7	1.3	.2	**.1**	6.4	**5.4**
2017–18	Milano	28	4	**18.4**	.417	.409	**.857**	1.0	**1.4**	.4	**.1**	**7.1**	5.3
2018–19	Milano	22	**11**	16.6	**.479**	**.536***	.824	1.0	.6	**.7**	—	6.4	5.1
2019–20	Khimki	21	7	16.9	.438	.429	.800	.6	1.1	.3	—	4.6	3.1
2020–21	Khimki	20	6	17.2	.344	.348	.857	**1.2**	.9	.4	**.1**	5.4	2.7
Career		123	35	17.0	.429	.441	.840	.9	1.1	.4	.0	6.1	4.5

== National team career ==
Bertāns has been member of the Latvian U-16, U-19 and U-20 national teams, as well as the senior national team. He led Latvia to a bronze medal at the 2007 U18 European Championship in Madrid, Spain. He has since represented the Latvia national team at the EuroBasket 2011. Furthermore, he was also the leading scorer (14.1 ppg) for Latvia in 2012, when he helped Latvia earn a spot in EuroBasket 2013.

Bertāns was a key player for Latvia during EuroBasket 2013 where he averaged 10.9 ppg. In his best game of the tournament Bertāns had a 28-point performance against France, the eventual champions.

He returned for EuroBasket 2015 and 2017, helping Latvia get to the quarterfinal round on both occasions.

=== Statistics ===
Tournament	Games played	Points per game	Rebounds per game	Assists per game
EuroBasket 2011	5	8.6	1.8	2.0
EuroBasket 2013	8	10.9	1.8	2.1
EuroBasket 2015	9	10.0	2.3	3.0
EuroBasket 2017	7	11.1	3.3	5.3
EuroBasket 2025	6	6.5	1.5	1.2

== Personal life ==
Bertāns' brother, Dāvis, is also a professional basketball player. Their father, Dainis, was a professional basketball player and is currently a youth coach. Their mother is a sports teacher and a former high-level rower. During his childhood, Bertāns was raised in Latvia's northernmost town, Rūjiena, until his parents moved to the capital city, Riga.
