= Roberts Bērziņš =

Latvian basketball player

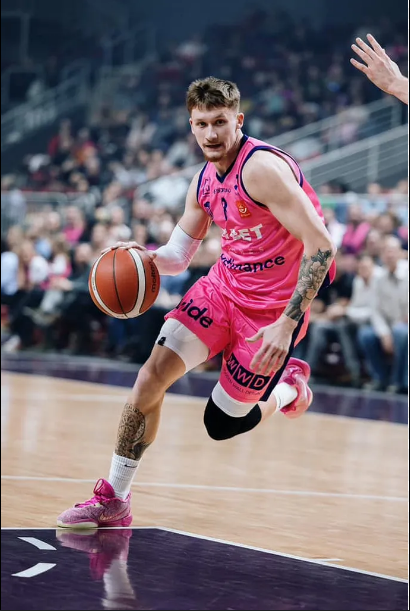

No. 8 – Rīgas Zeļļi
- Position: Shooting guard
- League: LEBL

Personal information
- Born: January 10, 2001 (age 25) Jūrmala, Latvia
- Listed height: 6 ft 4 in (1.93 m)
- Listed weight: 206 lb (93 kg)

Career information
- Playing career: 2018–present

Career history
- 2018–2019: CB Prat
- 2019–2020: BK Jūrmala
- 2020–2022: BK Liepāja
- 2022–2024: VEF Rīga
- 2024–present: Rīgas Zeļļi

Career highlights
- 2x LBL champion (2023, 2024); 2x Latvian Cup winner (2023-24)

Roberts Bērziņš (born January 10, 2001) is a Latvian professional basketball player who currently plays for the Rīgas Zeļļi. He plays at shooting guard position.

Still a junior, Berzins played one season for Joventut Badalona youth categories. In 2020, he signed with BK Liepāja. In the summer of 2022, Berzins signed a three-year contract with the VEF Rīga.

Berzins has represented Latvia in FIBA U16 European Championships
