= Tyler Wahl =

American basketball player (born 2001)

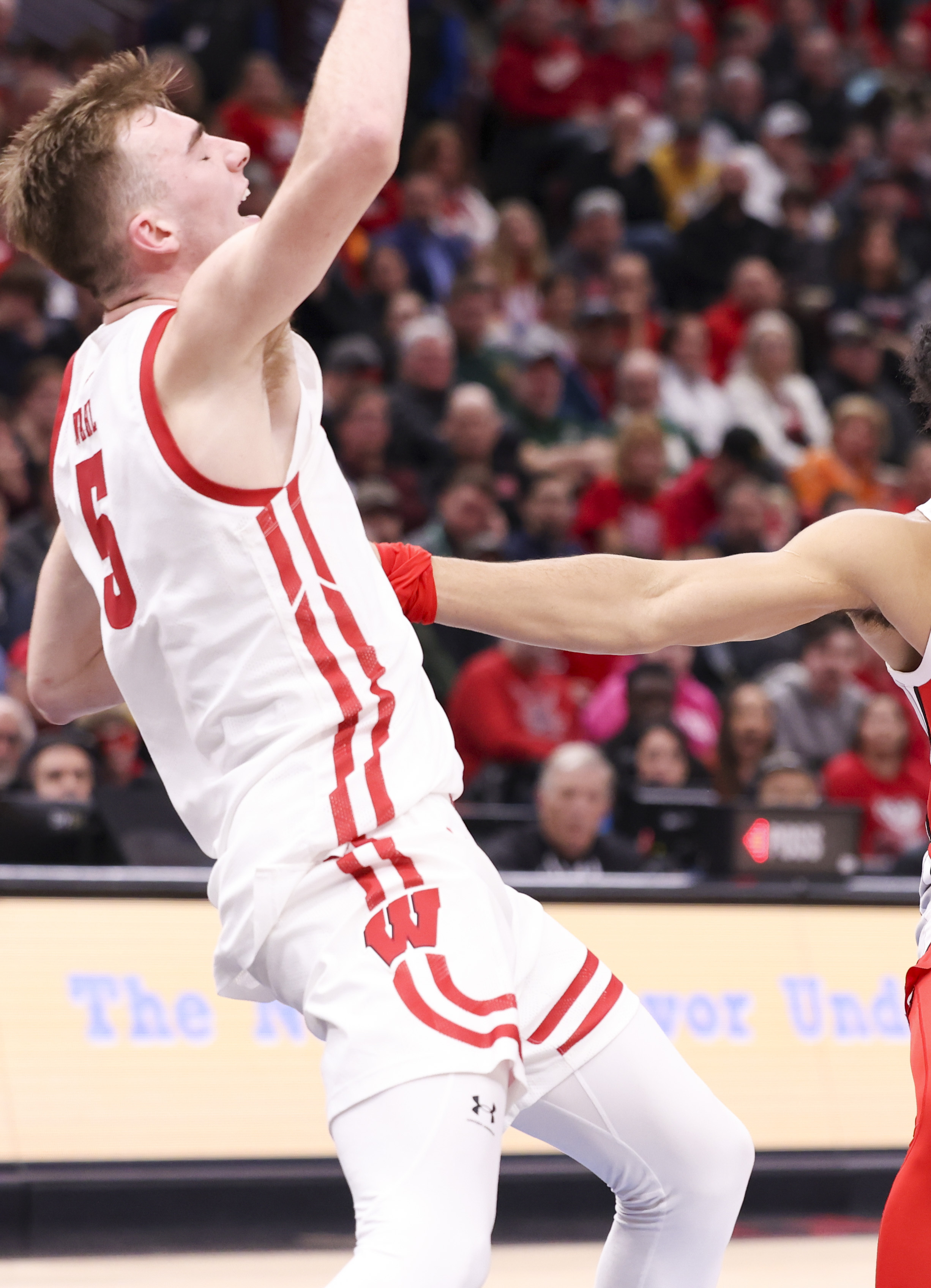
- Wahl with the Wisconsin Badgers in 2023

No. 5 – Rīgas Zeļļi
- Position: Power forward
- League: LEBL

Personal information
- Born: March 7, 2001 (age 25) Lakeville, Minnesota, U.S.
- Listed height: 6 ft 9 in (2.06 m)
- Listed weight: 225 lb (102 kg)

Career information
- High school: Lakeville North (Lakeville, Minnesota)
- College: Wisconsin (2019–2024)
- NBA draft: 2024: undrafted
- Playing career: 2024–present

Career history
- 2024–2025: KK Zadar
- 2025: Panionios
- 2025–2026: Anwil Włocławek
- 2026–present: Rīgas Zeļļi

Career highlights
- Croatian League champion (2025)

Tyler Wahl (born March 7, 2001) is an American professional basketball player for Rīgas Zeļļi of the Latvian–Estonian Basketball League. He played college basketball for the Wisconsin Badgers of the Big Ten Conference.

== Early life and high school career ==
Wahl was born in Lakeville, Minnesota and played at Lakeville North High School. During his junior season, Wahl averaged 17.5 points (63.1% FG), 12.0 rebounds, 5.4 assists, and 2.9 blocks per game, which helped guide Lakeville North to a record of 27–5 and a trip to the 2018 Class 4A state tournament semifinals. As a senior, he averaged 18.0 points, 10.0 rebounds and 6.6 assists per game. He helped lead the Lakeville North Panthers to a 27–5 record in 2018–19, helping guide the team to its first-ever conference title and an appearance in the Class 4A state championship game. He earned back-to-back AP second-team all-state honors as a junior and senior. Wahl was also named a finalist for Minnesota Mr. Basketball.

=== Recruiting ===
Wahl committed to Wisconsin after receiving offers from Minnesota, Northwestern, Butler, Northern Iowa, Iowa State, among other offers.

College recruiting
| Name | Hometown | School | Height | Weight | Commit date |
|---|---|---|---|---|---|
| Tyler Wahl; SF | Lakeville, MN | Lakeville North High School (MN) | 6 ft 7 in (2.01 m) | 200 lb (91 kg) | Jun 21, 2018 |
| Tyler Wahl; SF | Recruit ratings: Scout: Rivals: 247Sports: (N/A) | | | | |
Overall recruit ranking: 247Sports: 176
Note: In many cases, Scout, Rivals, 247Sports, On3, and ESPN may conflict in their listings of height and weight.; In these cases, the average was taken. ESPN grades are on a 100-point scale.; Sources: "2019 Wisconsin Commitments". Rivals.; "Men's Basketball Recruiting". Scout.; "ESPN- Wisconsin Badgers Men's Basketball Recruiting". ESPN.; "Scout.com Team Recruiting Rankings". Scout.; "2019 Team Ranking". Rivals.

== College career ==
=== Freshman season ===
Wahl arrived as a highly touted freshman, but the Badgers already had experienced forwards Nate Reuvers, Micah Potter, and Aleem Ford. His talent, however, was undeniable, and coach Greg Gard had to find a role for Wahl. Gard viewed Wahl as a "Swiss Army knife" capable of playing multiple roles: distributing the ball as a point guard point guard, defending the opposing team's best player, sliding over to take a charge, or being the primary scorer. He played in all 31 games, including three starts, averaging 2.5 points and 2.6 rebounds while playing 15.5 minutes per game as a true freshman.

=== Sophomore season ===
Wahl secured a larger role on a senior-heavy Wisconsin roster. He played in 31 games and started the final 18. As the team's second-leading rebounder, he averaged 4.3 rebounds per game. Wahl's assertiveness grew on the court as his playing time and confidence increased. Wahl showed his all-around skills during a victory against UW–Green Bay when he scored 11 points, 15 rebounds, four assists, two steals and two blocks.

=== Junior season ===
Wahl was a big part of the 2021–22 season for the Badgers, as they won a share of the Big Ten regular season title. Early in the season, Wahl was named to the All-Tournament Team at the 2021 Maui Invitational where the Badgers were the champions of the tournament. He improved his scoring, field goal percentage, free throw percentage, rebounding, assists, steals, and blocks. He was tabbed as the "glue guy" for the Badgers by coach Greg Gard. Wahl scored 20 or more points three different times during the season, but none was more complete than the victory over the 16th-ranked Ohio State Buckeyes. Wahl put up 20 points on 8 of 10 shooting (2–4 3FG), 7 rebounds, 6 assists, and 3 steals in the top 20 matchup. Following the season, Wahl was named Big Ten honorable mention.

=== Senior season ===
The Badgers came out strong during the 2022–23 season with a third-place finish at the 2022 Battle 4 Atlantis where Wahl was named to the All-Tournament Team. Wahl and the Badgers started 11–2 and 3–0 in the Big Ten before Wahl went down with an ankle injury against Minnesota. Wahl missed the next three games, all of which the Badgers lost. Wahl returned but was hampered for most of the rest of the season. Wahl still managed an 11.3 scoring average per game plus a career-high in rebounds (6.3) and assists (2.5) per game. Following the season, Wahl had the decision to go pro, transfer or return for a 5th season due to the pandemic.

=== Graduate season ===
About a month after the 2022–23 season ended, Wahl announced that he will take advantage of the pandemic wavier and return to Wisconsin for a fifth season. Early in the season, the Badgers participated in the 2023 Fort Myers Tip-Off in which Wisconsin defeated SMU for the title. Wahl was named to the All-Tournament Team and the Tournament's MVP. Following the completion of the regular season, Wahl was named All-Big Ten honorable mention by the coaches.

== Professional career ==
On June 27, 2024, after going undrafted in the 2024 NBA Draft, Wahl signed with the Minnesota Timberwolves. On August 7, he signed with KK Zadar of the Croatian League. On August 5, 2025, Wahl moved to Greek club Panionios.

On December 21, 2025, he signed with Anwil Włocławek of the Polish Basketball League (PLK).

== Career statistics ==
Legend
| GP | Games played | GS | Games started | MPG | Minutes per game |
| FG% | Field goal percentage | 3P% | 3-point field goal percentage | FT% | Free throw percentage |
| RPG | Rebounds per game | APG | Assists per game | SPG | Steals per game |
| BPG | Blocks per game | PPG | Points per game | **Bold** | Career high |

=== College ===
| Year | Team | GP | GS | MPG | FG% | 3P% | FT% | RPG | APG | SPG | BPG | PPG |
|---|---|---|---|---|---|---|---|---|---|---|---|---|
| 2019–20 | Wisconsin | 31 | 3 | 15.4 | .430 | .214 | .389 | 2.6 | 1.0 | 0.6 | 0.2 | 2.6 |
| 2020–21 | Wisconsin | 31 | 17 | 24.7 | .436 | .278 | .567 | 4.3 | 1.4 | 1.0 | 0.7 | 5.2 |
| 2021–22 | Wisconsin | 32 | 32 | 30.5 | .516 | .162 | **.700** | 5.9 | 1.5 | **1.2** | **0.8** | **11.4** |
| 2022–23 | Wisconsin | 32 | 32 | **31.5** | .423 | **.294** | .634 | **6.3** | **2.5** | **1.2** | 0.4 | 11.3 |
| 2023–24 | Wisconsin | **36** | **36** | 28.4 | **.535** | .188 | .659 | 5.4 | 1.9 | 1.1 | 0.6 | 10.6 |
| Career | | 162 | 121 | 26.2 | .477 | .232 | .637 | 4.9 | 1.7 | 1.0 | 0.5 | 8.3 |

=== Professional career ===
| Year | Team | League | GP | MPG | 2FGP% | 3FGP% | FT% | RPG | APG | SPG | BPG | PPG |
|---|---|---|---|---|---|---|---|---|---|---|---|---|
| 2024–25 | KK Zadar | ABA League | 28 | 26.1 | .585 | .263 | .607 | 5.5 | 2.9 | 1.0 | 0.2 | 10.4 |
| 2024–25 | KK Zadar | Croatian League | 38 | 26.4 | .579 | .135 | .599 | 6.9 | 2.5 | 1.1 | 0.5 | 10.9 |

== Personal life ==
Wahl's parents are Tim and Kaye Wahl. His father, Tim, played college basketball at Mankato State University and professionally in Germany after he was a finalist for the Minnesota Mr. Basketball award. Tyler's sister played college basketball at UW–La Crosse and is on the top 20 career scoring list for the Eagles.
