= M. J. Randolph =

American basketball player

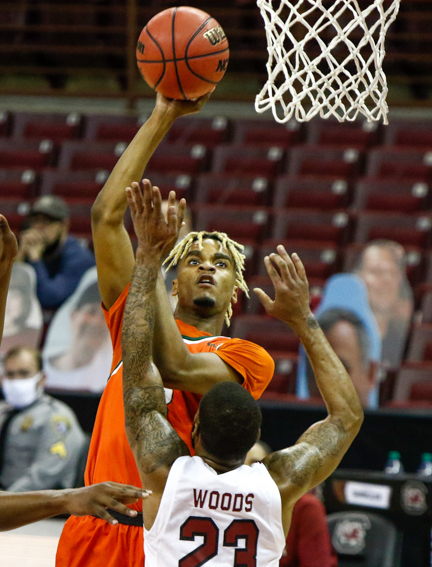
- Randolph with Florida A&M in 2021

No. 3 – CSU Sibiu
- Position: Shooting guard
- League: Liga Națională

Personal information
- Born: November 18, 1999 (age 26)
- Listed height: 6 ft 4 in (1.93 m)
- Listed weight: 170 lb (77 kg)

Career information
- High school: Booker T. Washington (Pensacola, Florida)
- College: Florida A&M (2018–2022)
- NBA draft: 2022: undrafted
- Playing career: 2022–present

Career history
- 2022–2023: UCC Demons
- 2023–2024: SKN St. Pölten
- 2024–2025: BK Ventspils
- 2025–present: CSU Sibiu

Career highlights
- Super League Player of the Year (2023); Super League All-Star First Team (2023); SWAC Player of the Year (2022); First-team All-SWAC (2022); First-team All-MEAC (2021); MEAC All-Defensive Team (2021); MEAC Rookie of the Year (2019); MEAC All-Rookie Team (2019)

Michael Anthony Randolph Jr. (born November 18, 1999) is an American professional basketball player for CSU Sibiu of the Romanian Liga Națională. He played college basketball for the Florida A&M Rattlers of the Southwestern Athletic Conference (SWAC).

== High school career ==
Randolph moved to Pensacola, Florida at the age of seven. He attended Booker T. Washington High School. Randolph was named Pensacola News Journal All-Area three times. He hit the game-winning three-pointer in an 69–67 victory over Pensacola High School in January 2018, finishing with 27 points. Randolph averaged 21.4 points, 6.7 rebounds and 3.8 steals per game as a senior. He committed to play college basketball at Florida A&M.

== College career ==
As a freshman, Randolph averaged 7.2 points, 3.9 rebounds and 1.7 assists.per game and was named MEAC rookie of the week six times. He averaged 13.0 points, 5.8 rebounds and 1.8 steals per game as a sophomore. As a junior, Randolph averaged 15.3 points, 6.4 rebounds, and 4.4 assists per game, earning First Team All-MEAC honors. On December 17, 2021, he scored a career-high 31 points in an 80–66 loss to Santa Clara. He was named SWAC player of the week five times as a senior and had two double-doubles. At the close of the regular season, Randolph was named SWAC Player of the Year. He averaged 18.9 points, 6.2 rebounds, 3.7 assists and two steals per game.

== Professional career ==
Randolph went undrafted in the 2022 NBA draft, eventually training with some NBA G League teams, including the Birmingham Squadron that summer. After being waived a few weeks later, he returned home to Pensacola.

In December 2022, Randolph signed with UCC Demons in Ireland for the rest of the 2022–23 Super League season. He was named the league's Player of the Month for December after averaging 34.7 points per game in three wins, which included a 38-point game. A 40-point game in February saw him earn another Player of the Month award. For the season, he averaged 30.8 points per game and was named Player of the Year and All-Star First Team.

In August 2023, Randolph signed with SKN St. Pölten of the Austrian Basketball Superliga. In 36 games in the 2023–24 season, he averaged 22.7 points, 5.9 rebounds, 4.4 assists and 1.6 steals per game.

On October 17, 2024, Randolph signed with BK Ventspils of the Latvian–Estonian Basketball League (LEBL) for the rest of the 2024–25 season. In 28 LEBL games, he averaged 16.0 points, 5.1 rebounds, 4.3 assists and 1.6 steals per game.

In July 2025, Randolph signed with CSU Sibiu of the Romanian Liga Națională.
