= Ronalds Zaķis =

Latvian basketball player (born 1987)

No. 30 – BK Ventspils
- Position: Center
- League: LEBL

Personal information
- Born: 8 July 1987 (age 39) Talsi, Latvian SSR, Soviet Union
- Listed height: 2.07 m (6 ft 9 in)
- Listed weight: 110 kg (243 lb)

Career information
- NBA draft: 2009: undrafted
- Playing career: 2006–present

Career history
- 2006–2008: BK Ventspils
- 2008: →VEF Rīga (loan)
- 2008–2014: BK Ventspils
- 2014–2015: VEF Rīga
- 2015–2016: Union Olimpija
- 2016–2020: BK Ventspils
- 2020–2021: Rostock Seawolves
- 2021–2022: Viimsi
- 2022–2023: Donar Groningen
- 2023: Viimsi
- 2023–present: BK Ventspils

Career highlights
- 5× LBL champion (2009, 2013, 2014, 2015, 2018); LBL All-Star Game MVP (2009); Baltic League champion (2013); Latvian-Estonian League champion (2019)

Ronalds Zaķis (born 8 July 1987) is a Latvian professional basketball player who plays for Ventspils of the Latvian–Estonian Basketball League.

== Career ==
Ronalds Zaķis started his career playing for BK Ventspils. In early 2008, he was loaned to VEF Rīga and after the season he declared for the 2008 NBA draft, however, he pulled out and ultimately was never drafted. For 2008-09 Zaķis returned to Ventspils, winning his first Latvian League championship.

On 22 July 2014 Zaķis signed a contract with VEF Rīga. With VEF he won his third Latvian championship.

On 12 August 2015 Zaķis moved to Slovenian team Union Olimpija for the 2015–16 season.

In August 2016, Zaķis returned to Ventspils.

In August 2020 he signed for the Rostock Seawolves in the German ProA League. In summer 2021 he joined Latvian-Estonian Basketball League debutants KK Viimsi and helped them to reach the Final Four.

On 13 July 2022, he signed a one-year contract with Dutch club Donar of the BNXT League.

== International career ==
Zaķis was leading scorer of entire 2007 FIBA Europe Under-20 Championship with 24.7 ppg. His first appearance for Latvian national team came in 2008, he played in 10 games over his career.
