= Toms Skuja =

Latvian basketball player

No. 3 – Rīgas Zeļļi
- Position: Point guard
- League: LEBL

Personal information
- Born: 2 January 2002 (age 24) Rīga, Latvia
- Listed height: 1.91 m (6 ft 3 in)
- Listed weight: 85 kg (187 lb)

Career information
- Playing career: 2017–present

Career history
- 2017–2018: Valmiera/Ordo
- 2020–2022: Sant Antoni
- 2022–2023: Latvijas Universitāte
- 2023–2025: Rīgas Zeļļi
- 2025–2026: Riesen Ludwigsburg
- 2026–present: Rīgas Zeļļi

Toms Skuja (born 2 January 2002) is a Latvian professional basketball player for Rīgas Zeļļi of the Latvian–Estonian Basketball League (LEBL). He plays at point guard position.

== Professional career ==
Skuja made his professional debut at the age of 16 when played four games for Valmiera/Ordo. In 2018 Toms moved to Spain, signing a long-term contract with Baloncesto Fuenlabrada. In 2020, he signed with CB Sant Antoni and over the next two season played in Tercera FEB and Segunda FEB.

In summer of 2022, Skuja came back to his homeland and joined the Latvijas Universitāte team in Latvian-Estonian Basketball League. After a breakout season there he signed with newly founded Rīgas Zeļļi.

== National team ==
Skuja represented Latvia in youth categories, including 2011 FIBA Under-19 World Championship.

On November 22, 2024, Skuja made his debut for the Latvia senior national team.
