= Juris Umbraško =

Latvian basketball player and coach

SKS Starogard Gdański
- Title: Head coach
- League: I Liga

Personal information
- Born: July 25, 1979 (age 47) Jekabpils, Latvia
- Listed height: 6 ft 6 in (1.98 m)
- Listed weight: 220 lb (100 kg)

Career information
- NBA draft: 2001: undrafted
- Playing career: 1998–2015
- Position: Small forward
- Number: 21
- Coaching career: 2015–present

Career history

Playing
- 1998–2000: ASK Broceni LMT
- 2000–2002: CSKA Moscow
- 2002–2003: BK Ventspils
- 2004–2006: BC Khimik
- 2006–2007: BC Cherkasy Mavpy
- 2006–2007: Riga Barons
- 2007–2008: Politehnika Galychyna
- 2008–2009: BK Ventspils
- 2010–2011: VEF Rīga
- 2011–2015: Rakvere Tarvas

Coaching
- 2015: Dynamo Moscow (assistant)
- 2015–2016: Froya Basket
- 2016–2017: Valga-Valka/ Maks&Moorits
- 2018–2021: BC Rakvere Tarvas
- 2021–2023: BK Liepāja (assistant)
- 2023–2026: Rīgas Zeļļi
- 2026–present: Starogard Gdański

Career highlights
- Latvian champion (2002, 2003, 2011); Estonian Cup winner (2012); As head coach: Best Coach of Latvian Basketball League (2024)

Juris Umbraško (born 25 July 1979 in Jekabpils, Latvia) is a Latvian professional basketball coach and player. He heads the Latvian-Estonian Basketball League team Rīgas Zeļļi.

== Club play ==
Umbraško started his senior club career with Latvijas Basketbola līga team ASK Broceni LMT and later moved to European basketball powerhouse CSKA Moscow.

In 2002 he returned to Latvia to represent BK Ventspils and won the Latvian Championship titles in 2002 and 2003.

After years abroad and in Latvia, he struggled to play consistently. He played in Ukraine for almost 4 years, representing different teams, but achieving little success.

In 2008 he returned to Latvia to play an episodic role in VEF Riga's Latvian League triumph.

At the beginning of the 2011–2012 season, he joined Estonian team BC Rakvere Tarvas with fellow Latvians Kaspars Cipruss and Rinalds Sirsniņš.

== Club coach ==
Umbraško was named the Best Coach of the Latvian Basketball League by Latvian journalists after leading the Latvian-Estonian Basketball League club Rigas Zeļļi to the 2024 playoffs in the team's debut season.

== International career ==
Juris Umbraško has been a frequent member of the Latvia national basketball team. He first represented Latvia in youth level, U22 games and caught attention of the senior team staff. He was then called up to the men's squad in 2000 and played regularly until 2002, while playing in CSKA Moscow. His latter stints became occasional and he has not played in any major tournament with the Latvian senior team.

== Honours ==
- Latvijas Basketbola līga: 2002, 2003, 2011
- EuroCup Challenge:
  - Runner-up: 2005-06
- FIBA SuproLeague:
  - 3rd place: 2002-03
- Russian Basketball Super League:
  - Final Four: 2000-01
- BBL Cup: 2012
- BBL Challenge Cup:
  - Runner-up: 2011-12
- Estonian Basketball Cup: 2012
