= Robert Ford III =

American basketball player (born 1999)

No. 20 – Stade Rochelais Basket
- Position: Point guard / shooting guard
- League: Élite 2

Personal information
- Born: October 25, 1999 (age 27) Portland, Oregon, U.S.
- Listed height: 1.84 m (6 ft 0 in)
- Listed weight: 82 kg (181 lb)

Career information
- High school: Jefferson (Portland, Oregon)
- College: Clackamas CC (2018–2020); Idaho State (2020–2022); Montana State (2022–2024)
- NBA draft: 2024: undrafted
- Playing career: 2024–present

Career history
- 2024–2025: Rio Grande Valley Vipers
- 2025: Rigas Zeļļi
- 2025-present: Stade Rochelais Basket

Career highlights
- First-team All-Big Sky (2024); Big Sky Defensive Player of the Year (2024); Big Sky All-Defensive Team (2024); Big Sky tournament MVP (2024)

Robert Ford III (born October 25, 1999) is an American professional basketball player for Stade Rochelais Basket of the Élite 2.

== College ==
Spent the first two seasons of his college career at Clackamas Community College and registered seven triple doubles for Clackamas during the 2019-20 campaign. Then moved to Idaho State. Spent the last two college career seasons at Montana State.

== Professional career ==
After going undrafted in the NBA Draft, Ford III signed for Würzburg Baskets in German Basketball Bundesliga. However, an injury during pre-season held Ford back for a long time. On August 21, 2024, team terminated the contract.

Ford III returned to the States and started his pro career in the NBA G League, playing for Rio Grande Valley Vipers. On February 20, 2025, his contract was placed on waivers. On March 7, 2025, Robert signed with Rīgas Zeļļi, just before the Latvian-Estonian Basketball League playoffs. On June 18, 2025, he signed a contract with Stade Rochelais Basket

== Personal life ==
Ford's father was killed in 2012 and his brother died the same day eight years later. During his time in Montana, Ford III spent his off days connected with youth sports in town, cheering or coaching the next generation.
