= Latvian Basketball Cup =

Domestic basketball cup competition

Latvijas basketbola Užavas kauss
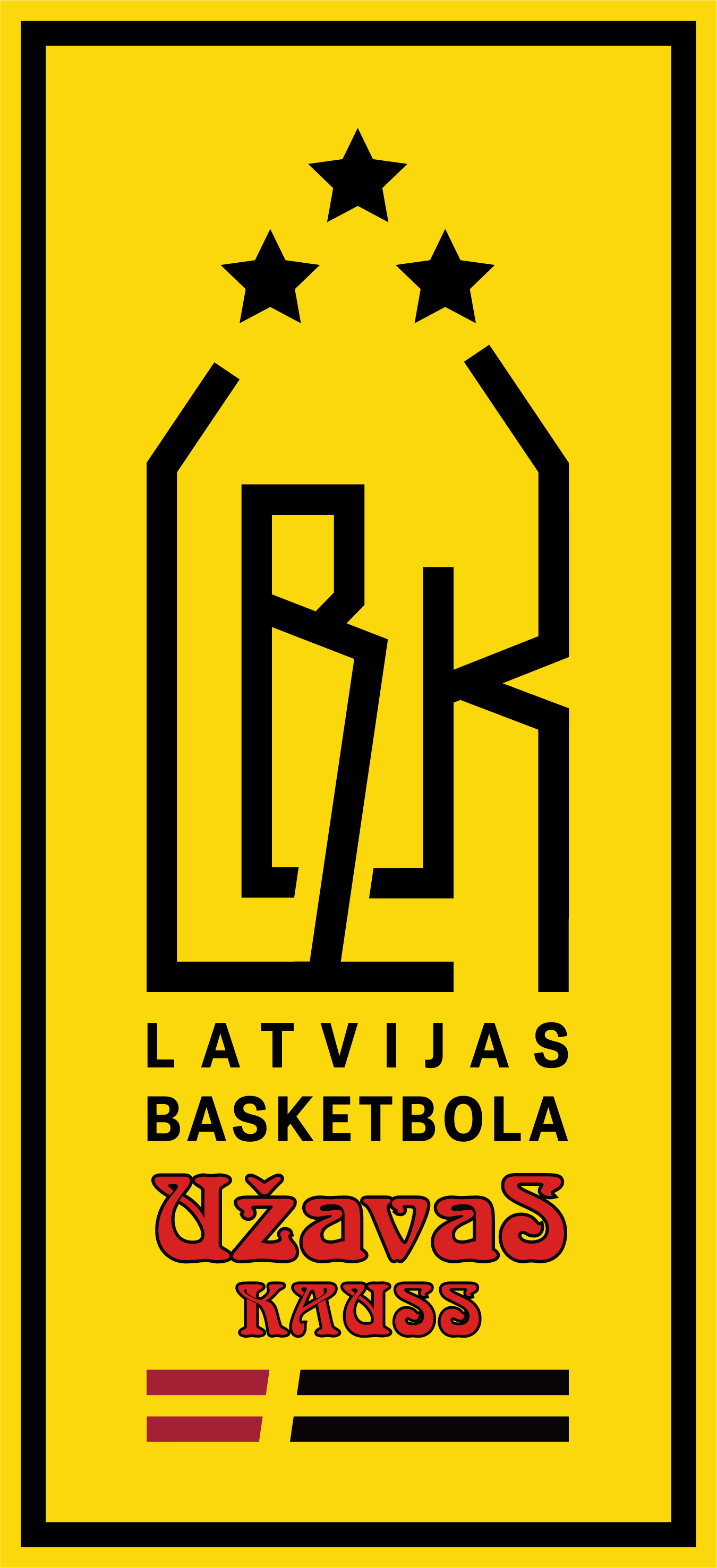
- Sport: Basketball
- First season: 2020
- No. of teams: 23 (2020–2021); 21 (2021–2022); 21 (2022–2023); 20 (2023–2024); 22 (2024–2025); 22 (2025–2026)
- Country: Latvia
- Most recent champion: VEF Rīga (4th title)
- Most titles: VEF Rīga (4 titles)
- Broadcasters: TV4; LTV7
- Related competitions: LBL; LEBL
- Website: Link

Latvian Basketball Cup (Latvian: Latvijas kauss basketbolā), for sponsorship reasons known as Latvijas Basketbola Užavas kauss, is an annual national domestic basketball cup competition in Latvia. It is organised by the Latvian Basketball Association. After 26 years long absence, it was restored in 2020. However, due to COVID-19 pandemic, the first season was cancelled. In the season 2021–22, the cup was finally played, and BK VEF Rīga won it for the first time.

== History ==
Latvian Basketball Cup was first organized since 1948 to 1952 and since 1960 to 1994. After former Latvia NT player Kristaps Janičenoks became the director of Latvian Basketball League, he restored the competition in 2020. However, due to COVID-19 pandemic the first season was cancelled after the first games.

In the 2021–22 season Užavas Beer (Užavas alus) became the title sponsor of the tournament. On March 7, BK VEF Rīga won the title, beating BK Ventspils in the final, which was held in Ventspils.

2022–23 was the second full season of the restored competition. The same number of teams participated as the previous year – 21. There was a couple of surprising results, as second division teams BK Gulbenes Buki and Kandava/Anzāģe won the first division teams, Valmiera Glass VIA and BK Liepāja respectively, in first games of ties. However, in second games first division teams always came back on won ties to qualify for the next rounds. Draw decided that the first season finalists BK VEF Rīga and BK Ventspils met in the semi-final already. Title defenders VEF won the tie and went back to the Final, where it met BK Liepāja. Final was played on 19th January, 2023, in Liepāja.

In 2023–24 season the biggest surprise was the newly created team Rīgas Zeļļi reaching the final, as they won the semi-final battle against previous finalist BK Liepāja. On the other side of the bracket BK VEF Rīga and BK Ventspils met again. Although, Ventspils won the first game, VEF overcame the deficit in the second leg and easily qualified for the final once again. The final was played in the city of Jelgava. In front of almost 2500 spectators BK VEF Rīga won pretty easily and won the trophy for the third straight year.

In 2024–25 season BK Ventspils made it back to the finals for the first time since inaugural season. There they lost to VEF Rīga once again.

== Format ==
Every basketball team in Latvia is allowed to participate in the tournament, even if it's an amateur level team. Professional teams join the tournament starting from the quarter-finals. Tournament is played in the knockout format; teams playing against each other over two legs on a home-and-away basis, with the overall cumulative score determining the winner of a round. Thus, the score of one single game can be tied. Final is played in one game.

== Winners ==
Year	Champion	Score	Runner-up	City	Venue	Final MVP
2022	VEF Rīga	74–62	Ventspils	Ventspils	Ventspils Olympic Center	(Finland) Alexander Madsen
2023	VEF Rīga	87–66	Liepāja	Liepāja	Liepāja Olympic Center	(Latvia) Kristers Zoriks
2024	VEF Rīga	94–69	Rīgas Zeļļi	Jelgava	Zemgale Olympic Center	(United States) Greg Whittington
2025	VEF Rīga	96–81	BK Ventspils	Daugavpils	Daugavpils Olympic Center	(Ukraine) Issuf Sanon
2026	Valmiera Glass ViA	84–70	BK Ventspils	Ventspils	Ventspils Olympic Center	(Lithuania) Dominykas Stenionis

== Half-time performers ==
Edition	Performers
2022	Citi Zēni
2023	Bermudu divstūris
2024	Ozols, Prusax, Reinis & Gita Reimanis
2025	Miks Galvanovskis
2026	Rolands Če, Bukte

== See also ==
- Latvian Basketball League
- Latvian–Estonian Basketball League
