= Latvijas Basketbola līga =

National basketball championship in Latvia

Latvian Basketball League Latvijas Basketbola līga (LBL)
- Most recent season or competition: 2026 LBL Play-offs
- Sport: Basketball
- Founded: 1992 (de facto 1924)
- No. of teams: 6
- Country: Latvia
- Continent: FIBA Europe
- Most recent champion: Valmiera Glass/VIA (1st title)
- Most titles: VEF Riga (12)
- Broadcasters: Latvia: LTV7; TV4
- Level on pyramid: 1st tier
- Domestic cup: Latvian Basketball Cup
- Related competitions: Nacionālā basketbola līga (LBL 2); Reģionālā basketbola līga (LBL 3)
- Tournament format: Play-off
- Website: basket.lv

The Latvian Basketball League (LBL; Latvian: Latvijas Basketbola līga) also known as Optibet LBL for sponsorship reasons, is the top-level national basketball championship in Latvia composed of 6 teams. Since 2018/19, only the playoff matches are played, as the top Latvian clubs play the regular season in the Latvian–Estonian Basketball League. The LBL is governed by the Latvian Basketball Association, the national governing body of basketball in Latvia.

Its 6 teams are located in 5 cities; two in Riga, and one in Ventspils, Liepāja, Valmiera, and Ogre. The LBL season usually ran from September to April, with the playoffs in April–May. The league was founded in 1992, and its first season was played in the same year.

== History ==
=== Before 1992 ===
After American YMCA volunteers introduced the sport in Riga around 1920, interest in the sport grew, and in 1923 the YMCA organized the first ever basketball tournament in Latvia, with 14 teams registering. In 1924, the newly-founded Latvian Basketball Association announced the first Latvian Basketball Championship in the winter of 1924 (Latvian: Latvijas meistarsacīkstes basketbolā) with 6 teams participating. It was won by the Latvian Sports Society (Latvijas Sporta biedrība) team, who defeated the Riga YMCA team (Rīgas JKS) in the final game with a score of 25:15. The first official national women's tournament followed in 1932.

The tournaments became defunct after the Soviet occupation of Latvia in 1940 (a Latvian League was played from 1942 to 1944 under the German occupation of the Baltic states during World War II). During the Soviet occupation after WWII, the Latvian SSR Basketball Championship was organized until 1991.

=== Early years ===
The first LBL season was played in 1992, with LBL2 (LBL 2. divīzija) as its second division and LBL3 as the third. From 1992 to 1999 all championships were won by BK Brocēni, however, from 2000 to 2006 BK Ventspils were the champions. In 2007, ASK Rīga stopped BK Ventspils' winning streak. BK Ventspils won again in 2009, beating Barons/LMT in a thriller 4–3.

=== Later history ===
Barons would return to the final the following year, this time against VEF Rīga, and win by the same 4–3 margin. The 2011 final again went to 7 games, with VEF Rīga defeating Ventspils. Between 2011 and 2018, the title changed hands frequently, with BK Valmiera Ordo claiming the title in 2016.

Since the introduction of the Latvian-Estonian Basketball League in the 2018/2019 season, the regular LBL championship was merged into the LEBL. The six top Latvian teams then qualify for the LBL playoffs after the end of the LEBL regular season. VEF Rīga has held the title ever since.

Starting from the 2020/2021 season, the 2nd tier Latvian league - LBL2 - was reformed into the Ramirent Nacionālā basketbola līga (NBL, National Basketball League) and the third-level league - LBL3 - became the Reģionālā basketbola līga (Regional Basketball League).

== Sponsorships ==
From 2012 to 2015, the league was known as Aldaris Latvijas Basketbola līga due to the AS Aldaris brewery becoming the general sponsor of the Latvian Basketball Association. In 2016, they were succeeded by betting brand OlyBet and in 2019 by Pafbet. Since 2024, the league has been sponsored by the sports bar and betting company Optibet.

== Teams ==
Location of teams in 2024–25 Latvian Basketball League

| Team | Home city | Arena |
|---|---|---|
| Liepāja | Liepāja | Liepāja Olympic Center |
| Latvijas Universitāte | Rīga | Olympic Sports Center |
| Ogre | Ogre | Ogre Secondary School No.1 |
| Valmiera Glass/VIA | Valmiera | Vidzeme Olympic Center |
| VEF Rīga | Rīga | Arena Riga; Olympic Sports Centre |
| Ventspils | Ventspils | Ventspils Olympic Center |
| Rīgas Zeļļi | Rīga | Daugava Sports Hall |

== Title holders ==
Latvian champions

- 1924 LSB Rīga
- 1925 JKS Rīga
- 1926 Rīgas FK
- 1927 Rīgas FK
- 1928 LSB Rīga
- 1929 JKS Rīga
- 1930 Universitātes Sports
- 1931 Latvju Jaunatne
- 1932 JKS Rīga
- 1933 Latvijas Valsts Karoga Apvienība
- 1934 Universitātes Sports
- 1935 Universitātes Sports
- 1936 Universitātes Sports
- 1937 Universitātes Sports
- 1938 Starts Rīga
- 1939 ASK Rīga
- 1940 ASK Rīga
- 1941 RDKA Rīga
- 1943 Starts Rīga
- 1944 Starts Rīga

Latvian SSR champions

- 1945 Daugava Rīga
- 1946 Daugava Rīga
- 1947 Daugava Rīga
- 1948 Daugava Rīga
- 1949
- 1950 LVU Rīga
- 1951 Dinamo Rīga
- 1952 LVU Rīga
- 1953 Rīgas ASK
- 1954 Spartaks Rīga
- 1955 Spartaks Rīga
- 1956 Spartaks Rīga
- 1957 Rīgas ASK
- 1958 Spartaks Rīga
- 1959 Rīgas VEF
- 1960 Rīgas VEF
- 1961 Rīgas VEF
- 1962 Rīgas ASK
- 1963 Liepājas Sarkanais Metalurgs
- 1964 Lokomotīve Rīga
- 1965 Rīgas ASK
- 1966 Rīgas ASK
- 1967 Rīgas ASK
- 1968 Liepājas Sarkanais Metalurgs
- 1969 Rīgas ASK
- 1970 Lokomotīve Rīga
- 1971 Rīgas VEF
- 1972 9. Auda
- 1973 Rīgas ASK
- 1974 Rīgas VEF
- 1975 Rīgas ASK
- 1976 Rīgas ASK
- 1977 BK Ķekava
- 1978 Rīgas ASK
- 1979 RPI Rīga
- 1980 BK Ādaži
- 1981 BK Ķekava
- 1982 RPI Rīga
- 1983 LVFKI Rīga
- 1984 RPI Rīga
- 1985 Jelgava SCO
- 1986 Jelgava SCO
- 1987 Rīgas ASK
- 1988 Rīgas ASK
- 1989 LVU Rīga
- 1990 LVU Rīga
- 1991 9. Auda

Latvian champions

- 1992 Brocēni Parair
- 1992–93 Brocēni
- 1993–94 SWH Brocēni
- 1994–95 SWH Brocēni
- 1995–96 ASK Brocēni
- 1996–97 ASK Brocēni LMT
- 1997–98 ASK Brocēni LMT
- 1998–99 Brocēni LMT
- 1999–00 Ventspils
- 2000–01 Ventspils
- 2001–02 Ventspils
- 2002–03 Ventspils
- 2003–04 Ventspils
- 2004–05 Ventspils
- 2005–06 Ventspils
- 2006–07 ASK Riga
- 2007–08 Barons LMT
- 2008–09 Ventspils
- 2009–10 Barons LMT
- 2010–11 VEF Rīga
- 2011–12 VEF Rīga
- 2012–13 VEF Rīga
- 2013–14 Ventspils
- 2014–15 VEF Rīga
- 2015–16 Valmiera Ordo
- 2016–17 VEF Rīga
- 2017–18 Ventspils
- 2018–19 VEF Rīga
- 2019–20 VEF Rīga
- 2020–21 VEF Rīga
- 2021–22 VEF Rīga
- 2022–23 VEF Rīga
- 2023–24 VEF Rīga
- 2024–25 VEF Rīga
- 2025–26 Valmiera Glass/VIA

== Performance by club ==
| Club | Winners | Runners-up | Winning years |
|---|---|---|---|
| VEF Rīga | 12 | 4 | 2011, 2012, 2013, 2015, 2017, 2019, 2020, 2021, 2022, 2023, 2024, 2025 |
| Ventspils | 10 | 13 | 2000, 2001, 2002, 2003, 2004, 2005, 2006, 2009, 2014, 2018 |
| Brocēni | 8 | 2 | 1992, 1993, 1994, 1995, 1996, 1997, 1998, 1999 |
| Barons | 2 | 3 | 2008, 2010 |
| ASK Riga | 1 | 1 | 2007 |
| Valmiera Glass/VIA | 1 | 0 | 2026 |
| Valmiera | 1 | 0 | 2016 |
| Bonus | 0 | 4 | |
| Skonto | 0 | 3 | |
| Ogre | 0 | 1 | |
| Metropole | 0 | 1 | |
| Liepāja | 0 | 1 | |
| Rīgas Zeļļi | 0 | 1 | |

== The finals ==
| Year | Winner | Runner-up | Score | Finals MVP |
|---|---|---|---|---|
| 1992 | Brocēni Parair | Bonus | 2–0 | |
| 1993 | Brocēni | Bonus | 3–0 | |
| 1994 | SWH Brocēni | Bonus | 3–0 | |
| 1995 | SWH Brocēni | Bonus | 4–3 | |
| 1996 | ASK Brocēni | Metropole | 4–2 | |
| 1997 | ASK Brocēni LMT | Liepājas Baltika | 4–0 | |
| 1998 | ASK Brocēni LMT | Ventspils | 4–1 | Ainārs Bagatskis |
| 1999 | Brocēni LMT | Ventspils | 4–2 | Edgars Šneps |
| 2000 | Ventspils | Brocēni LMT | 4–3 | Aigars Vītols |
| 2001 | Ventspils | BK LMT | 4–1 | |
| 2002 | Ventspils | Skonto | 4–0 | Kristaps Purnis |
| 2003 | Ventspils | Skonto | 4–1 | Mire Chatman |
| 2004 | Ventspils | Skonto | 4–0 | Kestutis Sestokas |
| 2005 | Ventspils | Barons | 4–0 | Justin Love |
| 2006 | Ventspils | Barons | 4–0 | Marijonas Petravičius |
| 2007 | ASK Riga | Ventspils | 4–2 | Sandis Valters |
| 2008 | Barons LMT | ASK Riga | 4–1 | Armands Šķēle |
| 2009 | Ventspils | Barons LMT | 4–3 | Mareks Jurevičus |
| 2010 | Barons LMT | VEF Rīga | 4–3 | Oritseweyinmi Efejuku |

| Year | Winner | Runner-up | Score | Finals MVP |
|---|---|---|---|---|
| 2011 | VEF Rīga | Ventspils | 4–3 | Sandis Valters |
| 2012 | VEF Rīga | Ventspils | 4–1 | Kristaps Janičenoks |
| 2013 | VEF Rīga | Ventspils | 4–1 | Earl Rowland |
| 2014 | Ventspils | VEF Rīga | 4–1 | Jānis Timma |
| 2015 | VEF Rīga | Ventspils | 4–2 | Mareks Mejeris |
| 2016 | Valmiera Ordo | VEF Rīga | 4–3 | Artūrs Bērziņš |
| 2017 | VEF Rīga | Ventspils | 4–0 | Mareks Mejeris |
| 2018 | Ventspils | VEF Rīga | 4–2 | Aigars Šķēle |
| 2019 | VEF Rīga | Ventspils | 4–1 | Jabril Durham |
| 2020 | VEF Rīga | Ogre | Playoffs cancelled due to COVID-19 | |
| 2021 | VEF Rīga | Ventspils | 4–0 | Kyle Allman Jr. |
| 2022 | VEF Rīga | Ventspils | 4–1 | Kristers Zoriks |
| 2023 | VEF Rīga | Ventspils | 4–1 | Nysier Brooks |
| 2024 | VEF Rīga | Rīgas Zeļļi | 4–1 | Arnaldo Toro |
| 2025 | VEF Rīga | Ventspils | 4–0 | Dairis Bertāns |
| 2026 | Valmiera Glass/VIA | Ventspils | 3–1 | |

== All–time national champions ==
Total number of national champions won by Latvian clubs. Table includes titles won during the Latvian Championships (1924–1944) and (1992–present) and the USSR Premier Basketball League (1945–1992).

| Club | Trophies | Years won |
|---|---|---|
| VEF Rīga | 12 | 2011, 2012, 2013, 2015, 2017, 2019, 2020, 2021, 2022, 2023, 2024, 2025 |
| Ventspils | 10 | 2000, 2001, 2002, 2003, 2004, 2005, 2006, 2009, 2014, 2018 |
| Brocēni | 8 | 1992, 1993, 1994, 1995, 1996, 1997, 1998, 1999 |
| Rīgas ASK | 6 | 1939, 1940, 1941, 1955, 1957, 1958 |
| Universitātes Sports | 5 | 1930, 1934, 1935, 1936, 1937 |
| JKS Rīga | 3 | 1925, 1929, 1932 |
| Starts Rīga | 3 | 1938, 1943, 1944 |
| Rīgas FK | 2 | 1926, 1927 |
| LSB Rīga | 2 | 1924, 1928 |
| Barons | 2 | 2008, 2010 |
| Latvju Jaunatne | 1 | 1931 |
| Latvijas Valsts Karoga Apvienība | 1 | 1933 |
| ASK Riga | 1 | 2007 |
| Valmiera | 1 | 2016 |
| Valmiera Glass/VIA | 1 | 2026 |

=== Titles by team (only Latvian 1924–2026) ===
| Team | Titles | Champion years |
|---|---|---|
| Rīgas ASK | 16 | 1939, 1940, 1941, 1953, 1957, 1962, 1965, 1966, 1967, 1969, 1973, 1975, 1976, 1978, 1987, 1988 |
| VEF Rīga | 12 | 2011, 2012, 2013, 2015, 2017, 2019, 2020, 2021, 2022, 2023, 2024, 2025 |
| Ventspils | 10 | 2000, 2001, 2002, 2003, 2004, 2005, 2006, 2009, 2014, 2018 |
| Rīgas VEF | 9 | 1954, 1955, 1956, 1958, 1959, 1960, 1961, 1971, 1974 |
| Brocēni | 8 | 1992, 1993, 1994, 1995, 1996, 1997, 1998, 1999 |
| Universitātes Sports | 5 | 1930, 1934, 1935, 1936, 1937 |
| Daugava Rīga | 4 | 1945, 1946, 1947, 1948 |
| LVU Rīga | 4 | 1950, 1952, 1989, 1990 |
| JKS Rīga | 3 | 1925, 1929, 1932 |
| Starts Rīga | 3 | 1938, 1943, 1944 |
| RPI Rīga | 3 | 1979, 1982, 1984 |
| Rīgas FK | 2 | 1926, 1927 |
| LSB Rīga | 2 | 1924, 1928 |
| Liepājas Sarkanais Metalurgs | 2 | 1963, 1968 |
| Lokomotīve Rīga | 2 | 1964, 1970 |
| BK Ķekava | 2 | 1977, 1981 |
| Jelgava SCO | 2 | 1985, 1986 |
| 9. Auda | 2 | 1972, 1991 |
| Barons | 2 | 2008, 2010 |
| Latvju Jaunatne | 1 | 1931 |
| Latvijas Valsts Karoga Apvienība | 1 | 1933 |
| Dinamo Rīga | 1 | 1951 |
| BK Ādaži | 1 | 1980 |
| LVFKI Rīga | 1 | 1983 |
| ASK Riga | 1 | 2007 |
| Valmiera | 1 | 2016 |
| Valmiera Glass/VIA | 1 | 2026 |

== See also ==
- Latvian Basketball All-Star Game
