= List of ASK Riga players =

This is a list of players who have played at least one game for the ASK Rīga professional basketball club, of the LBL, BBL, and other European leagues. This list also includes players for the former club BK Rīga and historical ASK team players.

== A ==
Milutin Aleksić, Oļģerts Altbergs, Martynas Andrukaitis, Marko Antonijevic,

== B ==
Steponas Babrauskas, Viesturs Baldzēns, Dairis Bertāns, Dāvis Bertāns, Kaspars Bērziņš, Visvaldis Bērziņš, Rodney Billups, Torraye Braggs, A. J. Bramlett, Corey L. Brewer, Dwayne Broyle, Sandis Buškevics,

== C ==
Sean Colson, Agnis Čavars, Markin Chandler,

== D ==
Vytautas Danelius,

== E ==
Visvaldis Eglītis, Raimonds Elbakjans,

== F ==
Rolands Freimanis,

== G ==
Raitis Grafs, Ainārs Gulbis, Alvils Gulbis,

== H ==
Oļģerts Hehts, Uvis Helmanis,

== J ==
Gatis Jahovičs, Leons Jankovskis,

== K ==
Teobalds Kalherts, Ernests Kalve, Kaspars Kambala, Raimonds Karnītis, Alfrēds Krauklis, Jānis Krūmiņš, Aivar Kuusmaa

== L ==
Māris Ļaksa, Jānis Laksa, Aivars Leončiks, Darius Lukminas,

== M ==
Ricardo Marsh, Andrius Mazutis, Roberts Mednis, Kristaps Mediss, Ādolfs Melgailis, Juris Mērksons, Salvis Mētra, Curtis Millage, Gundars Muižnieks, Valdis Muižnieks,

== N ==
Mārtinš Neimanis,

== O ==
Atis Ozols, Troy Ostler,

== P ==
Juris Patmalnieks, Smiljan Pavič, Krists Pīternieks, Jānis Pozņaks,

== R ==
Miervaldis Ramāns, Marius Runkauskas,

== S ==
Aerick Sanders, Andrejs Šeļakovs, Artūrs Šēnhofs, Roberts Štelmahers, Bruno Šundov,

== T ==
Jānis Timma,

== V ==
Maigonis Valdmanis, Sandis Valters, Arnis Vecvagars, Ivars Vērītis, Uģis Viļums, Aigars Vītols,

== Z ==
Gatis Zonbergs,
