= Latvian Basketball All-Star Game =

- Status: Inactive
- Inaugurated: 1993-94
- Most recent: 2016-17
- Organizer: Latvijas Basketbola līga

The Latvian Basketball All-Star Game was an annual basketball event in Latvia, organised by the Latvijas Basketbola līga. It was established during the 1993–94 season. The event consisted of an all-star game, a three-point shoot contest and slam-dunk exhibition.

== History ==
The event started after the founding of the Latvijas Basketbola līga. Many ledendary Latvian players like Ainars Bagatskis, Roberts Štelmahers, Igors Miglinieks, Kristaps Valters and Sandis Valters have played in the All-Star Game. The last edition was played on 11 February 2017. The introduction of the Latvian–Estonian Basketball League in 2018 meant the games would be between the All-Stars of the two leagues from the 2017–18 season onwards.

== List of games ==
Bold: Team that won the game.

Year	Location	Team	Score	Team	MVP
1999-00		Latvians		Foreigners	
2003-04		Latvians		Foreigners	
2004-05		Domestic	123-**127**	**Internationals**	(United States) Ben Walker
2005-06	Cēsis	East	100-**114**	**West**	(United States) (Latvia) Troy Ostler
2006-07	Valmiera	**East**	**119**-113	West	(United States) Curtis Millage
2007-08	Riga	East	121-121	West	(Nigeria) Akin Akingbala
2008-09	Ventspils	East	118-**137**	**West**	(Latvia) Ronalds Zakis
2009-10		East		West	
2010-11		**East**	**100**-94	West	(United States) Derek Williams
2011-12		Imports		Domestic	(Latvia) Zanis Peiners
2012-13		Domestic	86-**92**	**Imports**	(United States) P.J. Hill
2013-14		Domestic		Imports	(Latvia) Kristaps Dārgais
2014-15		Domestic		Imports	(Latvia) Jānis Timma
2015-16		**Domestic**	**125**-102	Imports	(Latvia) Zanis Peiners
2016-17		Domestic	95-**96**	**Imports**	(United States) Willie Deane

== Score sheets (1999-2008) ==
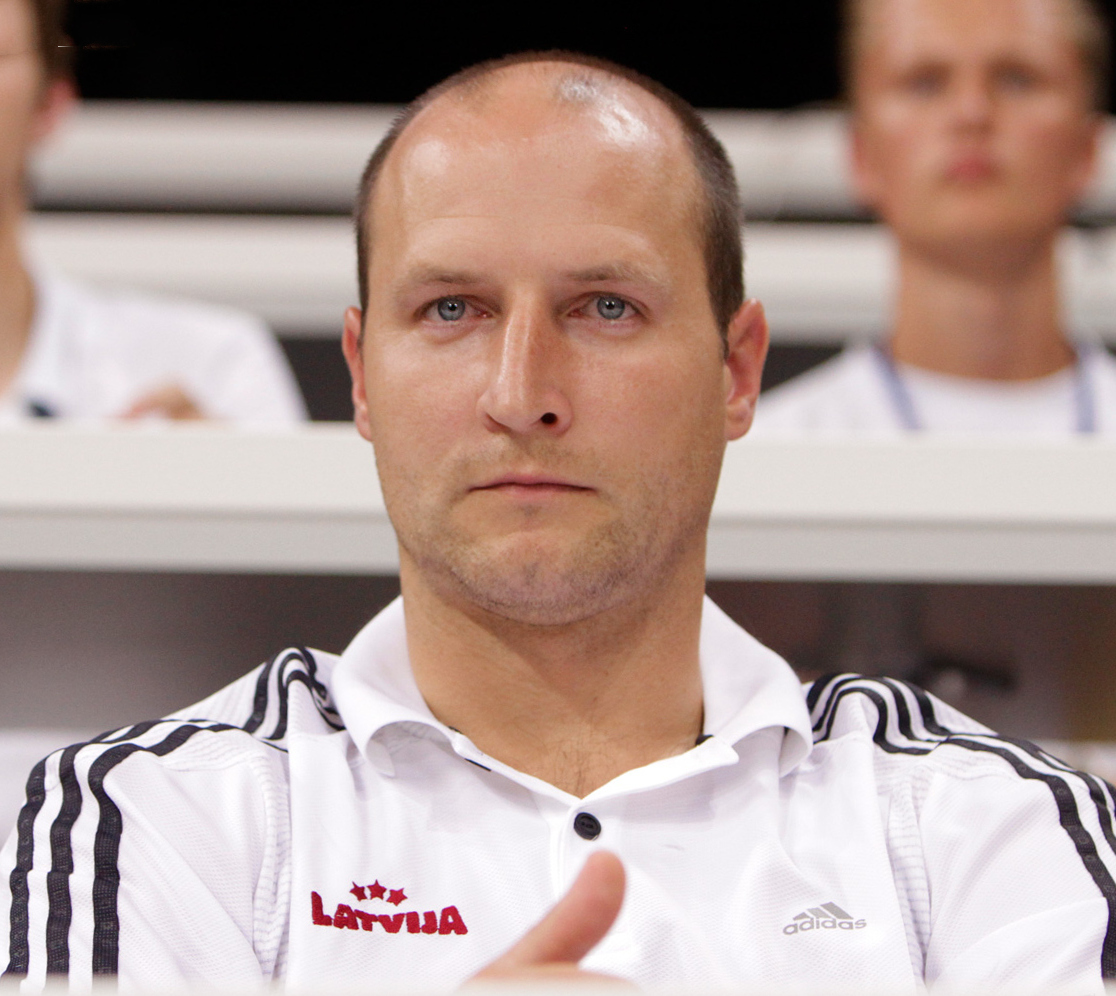
Roberts Štelmahers featured in the 1998 All-Star Game.

- All-Star Game 1999-00:

DATE:
VENUE:
SCORE: Foreign All-Stars – Latvians

Foreigners: Andrei Kapinos, Yohance Nicholas, Darnel Hoskins (all Ventspils), Charles Newbern, Demetrius Poles (both Broceni/LMT), O'Neil Kamaka, Mindaugas Pranckevicius (both LainERS), Andrey Riabtsev (ASK/Buki), Uldis Visnevics (Liepaja), Igors Miglinieks (Broceni/LMT). Coaches: Nikolai Balvachev (Broceni/LMT), Indulis Mozeiks (ASK/Buki).

Latvians: Sandis Buskevics, Kristaps Purnis, Janis Laksa, Aigars Vitols, Alex Sturms (all BK Ventspils), Kristaps Valters, Sandis Valters, Juris Umbrasko, Martins Skirmants (all Broceni/LMT), Agris Galvanovskis (ASK/Buki). Coaches: Armands Kraulins (Ventspils), Aigars Brigmanis (LainERS).

- All-Star Game 2003-04:

DATE:
VENUE:
SCORE: Foreign All-Stars – Latvia

Latvia: Aigars Vitols, Ilmars Bergmanis, Rinalds Sirsnins, Monvids Pirsko, Martins Skirmants, Pavels Veselovs, Ivars Timermanis, Dainis Obersats, Gatis Melderis, Arnis Vecvagars, Janis Laksa, Uldis Rudzitis. Coaches: Gundars Vetra (Barons), Agris Galvanovskis (ASK/Buki)

Foreigners: Dan McClintock, Dametri Hill, Ronell Mingo, Bogdan Karebin, Arvydas Straupis, Kestutis Sestokas, Darren Kelly, Zlatko Savovic, Delvon Arrington, Adrian Penland, Jarvis Mitchell, Timothy Owens. Coaches: Karlis Muiznieks (BK Ventspils), Guntis Endzels (BK Skonto)

- All-Star Game 2004-05:

DATE:
VENUE:
SCORE: Imports – Domestic 127–123

Domestic : Sandis Amolins 24, Ivars Timermanis 15, Pirsko 14, R.Gabrans 14, Jansons 12, Skirmants 13, Bambis, Kosuskins 6, E.Gabrans 6, Cavars 4, Brunins 5, Kravcenko 2

Internationals: Janisus 22, Ben Walker 22, Love 18, Lenzly 13, Wright 13, Stewart 9, Hlebowicki 8, Mitchell 7, Sestokas 7, Dabkus 7, Malesevic 2, Lisauskas 0.

- All-Star Game 2005-06:

DATE: 18 March 2006
VENUE: Cēsis
SCORE: East - West 100–114

East : Piternieks 20, Poznaks 18, Teteris 14, Cunda 10, Buikis 10, Cavars 8, Puce 5, Bers 4, Bencans 4, Senhofs 3, Bucs 2, S.Kiselovs 2.

West : Troy Ostler 24, Engelis 16, Sandis Valters 14, Berzins 12, Kanbergs 11, Vecvagars 10, Billups 9, Lagzdins 4, Zonbergs 4, Vinbergs 4, M.Rozitis 4, Melnbardis 2.

- All-Star Game 2006-07:

DATE: 24 February 2007
VENUE: Valmiera
SCORE: East - West 113–119

East : Curtis Millage 29, Sandis Buškevics 21, Babrauksas 17, Jansons 14, Bramlett 11, Vecvagars 9, Sandis Amolins 8, Bankevics 6, Bertans 2, Raiskums 2, Sirsnins, Bambis.

West : Curtis Marshall 32, Cipruss 19, R.Gabrans 15, Obersats 9, Vairogs 8, Helmanis 6, Vitols 6, Gulbis 6, Berzins 4, Ansons 4, Jurevicus 2, Strelnieks 2.

- All-Star Game 2007-08:

DATE: 9 February 2008
VENUE: Riga
SCORE: East - West 121–121

East : Broyles 18, Berkis 17, Millage 15, Stimac 15, Jeromanovs 13, Poznaks 12, Sheleketo 12, Bankevics 7, Valters 5, Jahovics 3, Bramlett 2, Slesers 2.

West : Akin Akingbala 26, Love 15, Baxter 14, Ansons 12, Gustas 12, K.Berzins 9, Skele 9, Helmanis 8, Jurevicus 8, Alexander 4, Vitols 2, A.Berzins 2.

== Three-Point Shoot Contest ==
Year	Player	Team
2004-05	(Latvia) Artūrs Brūniņš	Barons LMT
2005-06	(Latvia) Ivo Pūce	BK Cesis/Cesu
2006-07	(Latvia) Janis Ramma	BK Jūrmala
2007-08	(Latvia) Uvis Helmanis	BK Ventspils
2008-09	(Latvia) Uvis Helmanis (2)	ASK Riga
2010-11	(Latvia) Sandis Bets	BK Ogre
2016-17	(Latvia) Māris Gulbis	BK Ventspils

== Slam-Dunk champions ==
Year	Player	Team
2004-05	(Latvia) Aleksandrs Bondars	BK Barons
2005-06	(Latvia) Uldis Slapjums	VEF Riga
2006-07	(United States) Curtis Millage	ASK Riga
2007-08	(United States) Jimmy Baxter	BK Ventspils
2008-09	(Latvia) Ronalds Zakis	BK Ventspils
2010-11	(Latvia) Kristaps Dārgais	Latvijas Universitāte
2015-16	(Latvia) Kristaps Dārgais (2)	BK Barons
2016-17	(Latvia) Renars Bulduris	

== Topscorers ==
Year	Player	Points	Team
2004-05	(Latvia) Sandis Amolins	24	Valmiera
2005-06	(United States) (Latvia) Troy Ostler	24	BK Skonto
2006-07	(United States) Curtis Marshall	32	Barons/LMT
2007-08	(Nigeria) Akin Akingbala	26	BK Ventspils
2008-09	(Latvia) Andrejs Jansons	34	ASK Riga
2010-11	(United States) Derek Williams	20	Barons/LMT
2012-13	(Latvia) Jānis Timma	29	BK Ventspils
2015-16	(United States) Julius Brooks	34	BK Ogre
2016-17	(United States) Mārtiņš Meiers	26	VEF Rīga

== Players with most appearances ==
Player	All-Star	Editions	Notes
(Latvia) Sandis Valters	7	1998, 2000, 2006, 2007, 2008, 2010 and 2011	
(Latvia) Sandis Buškevics	5	1998, 2000, 2001, 2003 and 2007	
(Latvia) Aigars Vītols	5	1998, 2000, 2003, 2004 and 2005	
(Latvia) Uvis Helmanis	3	1998, 2007 and 2008	
(Latvia) Ainars Bagatskis	3	1994, 1998 and 2003	
(Latvia) Kristaps Valters	2	2000, 2003	
(Latvia) Armands Šķēle	2	2008 and 2009	

== See also ==
- Baltic Basketball All-Star Game
