= 2014–15 Latvian Basketball League =

- League: Latvian Basketball League
- Sport: Basketball
- Duration: October 1, 2014 – May 28, 2015
- Number of teams: 10
- TV partner(s): LTV7; Best4Sport TV; Sportacentrs TV

Regular season
- Top seed: BK Ventspils

Finals
- Champions: VEF Rīga
- Runners-up: BK Ventspils
- Finals MVP: (Latvia) Mareks Mejeris

LBL seasons
- ← 2013–14 2015–16 →

The 2014–15 Aldaris Latvian Basketball League is the 24th season of the top basketball league of Latvia. The regular season began on October 1, 2014, and ended on April 11, 2015. The playoffs began on April 15, 2015, and ended on May 28, 2015.

== Participants ==
Location of clubs in the 2014–15 Latvian Basketball League
- VEF Rīga
- BK Ventspils
- Liepāja/Triobet
- BK Valmiera
- BK Jelgava
- Jūrmala/Fēnikss
- BK Jēkabpils
- Latvijas Universitāte
- Barons/LDz
- BK Saldus

== Regular season ==
Pos	Team	Pld	W	L	PF	PA	PD	PCT	Qualification
1	BK Ventspils	18	15	3	1483	1206	+277	.833	Qualified for the semifinals
2	VEF Rīga	10	8	2	831	717	+114	.800	Qualified for the semifinals
3	Liepāja/Triobet	31	23	8	2464	2195	+269	.742	Qualified for the quarterfinals
4	Jūrmala/Fēnikss	31	18	13	2233	2167	+66	.581	Qualified for the quarterfinals
5	BK Jēkabpils	31	17	14	2330	2310	+20	.548	Qualified for the quarterfinals
6	Barons/LDz	31	15	16	2262	2385	−123	.484	Qualified for the quarterfinals
7	BK Valmiera	31	14	17	2342	2288	+54	.452	
8	BK Jelgava	31	13	18	2273	2251	+22	.419	
9	BK Saldus	31	8	23	2109	2419	−310	.258	
10	Latvijas Universitāte	31	7	24	1991	2380	−389	.226	

Source: LBL

== Playoffs ==
Quarterfinals
4	Jūrmala/Fēnikss	2
5	BK Jēkabpils	3
3	Liepāja/Triobet	3
6	Barons/LDz	0

Semifinals
1	BK Ventspils	3
5	BK Jēkabpils	2
2	VEF Rīga	3
3	Liepāja/Triobet	1

Finals
1	BK Ventspils	2
2	VEF Rīga	4
Third place
5	BK Jēkabpils	3
3	Liepāja/Triobet	1

== Awards ==
Month	Player of the Month	
Month	Player	Team
October	(Lithuania) Edgaras Želionis	Liepāja/Triobet
November	(Latvia) Ervīns Jonāts	Jūrmala/Fēnikss
December	(Latvia) Edgars Jeromanovs	Jūrmala/Fēnikss
January	(United States) Harvey Jerai Grant	BK Ventspils
February	(Lithuania) Dovydas Redikas	BK Jēkabpils
March	(Latvia) Dāvis Geks	BK Jelgava

== All-Star Game ==
(Latvia) Team National
Pos	Player	Team
Starters
G	Kristaps Janičenoks	BK Ventspils
G	Žanis Peiners	BK Ventspils
F	Jānis Timma	VEF Rīga
F	Kristaps Dārgais	BK Valmiera
C	Kaspars Kambala	Barons/LDz
Reserves
G	Ingus Jakovičs	VEF Rīga
G	Mareks Jurevičus	Liepāja/Triobet
F	Ingars Aizpurs	Latvijas Universitāte
F	Akselis Vairogs	BK Ventspils
F	Ervīns Jonāts	Jūrmala/Fēnikss
F	Mārtiņš Laksa	Jūrmala/Fēnikss
C	Lauris Blaus	Liepāja/Triobet
Head coach: Roberts Štelmahers (BK Ventspils)

Team International
Pos	Player	Team
Starters
G	(United States) Robert Lowery	VEF Rīga
F	(United States) Troy Marshall Barnies	BK Ventspils
F	(United States) Devin Marquise Taylor	BK Jēkabpils
F	(United States) Justin Hurtt	BK Valmiera
C	(United States) Harvey Jerai Grant	BK Ventspils
Reserves
G	(United States) Preston Jerome Medlin	BK Saldus
G	(Lithuania) Andrius Mažutis	Liepāja/Triobet
G	(United States) Gerald Robinson	VEF Rīga
G	(United States) Dwayne Johnson	Liepāja/Triobet
F	(Croatia) Mateo Kedzo	Barons/LDz
F	(Lithuania) Denis Krestinin	BK Jelgava
C	(Lithuania) Edgaras Želionis	Liepāja/Triobet
Head coach: Uvis Helmanis (Liepāja/Triobet)

21 February 2015
16:00

Boxscore

Team National 124, Team International 113
Scoring by quarter: 26–24, 29–34, 31–28, 38–27
Pts: Jānis Timma 41; Rebs: Kristaps Janičenoks 5 Asts: Žanis Peiners 11	Pts: Justin Hurtt 28; Rebs: Troy Marshall Barnies 4 Asts: Robert Lowery 6

Ventspils OC, Ventspils
Attendance: 2,500
Referees: Andris Aunkrogers, Artis Apermanis, Raimonds Buholcs

== See also ==
- 2014–15 VTB United League
- 2014–15 Baltic Basketball League
