= Lithuania at EuroBasket 2009 =

== Eurobasket 2009 tournament roster ==
The upcoming tournament in which Lithuania will compete in will be the Eurobasket 2009 in Poland. The roster of the team is given below:

Lithuanian National Basketball Team roster
Players
Coaches

Pos.	No.	Name	Age – Date of birth	Height	Club	Ctr.
G	4	Andrius Mažutis	28 – 21 April 1981	1.80 m (5 ft 11 in)	ASK Riga	(Latvia)
G	5	Mantas Kalnietis	23 – 6 September 1986	1.96 m (6 ft 5 in)	BC Žalgiris	(Lithuania)
SF	6	Jonas Mačiulis	24 – 10 February 1985	2.00 m (6 ft 7 in)	Armani Jeans Milano	(Italy)
C	7	Darjuš Lavrinovič	29 – 1 November 1979	2.12 m (6 ft 11 in)	Real Madrid	(Spain)
SG	8	Mindaugas Lukauskis	30 – 19 May 1979	1.98 m (6 ft 6 in)	ASVEL Basket	(France)
SG	9	Tomas Delininkaitis	27 – 11 June 1982	1.90 m (6 ft 3 in)	Free Agent
SF	10	Artūras Jomantas	24 – 4 May 1985	2.00 m (6 ft 7 in)	BC Lietuvos Rytas	(Lithuania)
F	11	Linas Kleiza	24 – 3 January 1985	2.03 m (6 ft 8 in)	Olympiacos BC	(Greece)
F/C	12	Kšyštof Lavrinovič	29 – 1 November 1979	2.10 m (6 ft 11 in)	Montepaschi Siena	(Italy)
G/F	13	Simas Jasaitis	27 – 26 March 1982	2.03 m (6 ft 8 in)	Galatasaray Cafe Crown	(Turkey)
C	14	Marijonas Petravičius	29 – 24 October 1979	2.09 m (6 ft 10 in)	Armani Jeans Milano	(Italy)
C	15	Robertas Javtokas (C)	29 – 20 March 1980	2.11 m (6 ft 11 in)	Khimki Moscow Region	(Russia)

Head coach

- (Lithuania) Ramūnas Butautas

Assistant coach(es)

- (Lithuania) Rimas Kurtinaitis
- (Lithuania) Robertas Kuncaitis
- (Lithuania) Virginijus Mikalauskas

Legend

- (C) Team captain
- Club field describes current pro club
- Age field is age on September 7, 2009

Candidates that did not make for the final team:

#	Position	Player	Year of birth	Last season's club before the tournament	Notes
	Forward	Paulius Jankūnas	1984	(Lithuania) Žalgiris Kaunas	Released from the team after first game in Acropolis Tournament. Announced 2009-08-25
	Forward	Mindaugas Katelynas	1983	(Italy) Armani Jeans Milano	Released from the team after training camp. Announced 2009-08-09
	Guard	Renaldas Seibutis	1985	(Spain) CB Bilbao Berri	Released from the team after training camp. Announced 2009-08-09
	Guard	Giedrius Gustas	1980	(Greece) Kavala BC	Released from the team after training camp. Announced 2009-08-09
Other candidates that didn't make to the training camp
	Forward	Darius Songaila	1978	(United States) NBA Washington Wizards	Retired from national team
	Forward	Ramūnas Šiškauskas	1978	(Russia) CSKA Moscow	Retired from national team after 2008 Summer Olympics
	Guard	Šarūnas Jasikevičius	1976	(Greece) Panathinaikos	Couldn't play because of several micro-injuries
	Center	Žydrūnas Ilgauskas	1975	(United States) NBA Cleveland Cavaliers	Cavaliers declined to give their permission to play for the team, as well as in 2008 Summer Olympics
	Guard	Arvydas Macijauskas	1980	(Greece) Olympiacos	Decided not to play because of trial vs. Olympiacos
	Guard	Rimantas Kaukėnas	1977	(Italy) Montepaschi Siena	Decided not to play because family circumstances

== Preparation matches ==
Note: All times are local

July 7

Lithuania	79–82	Lithuania
Scoring by quarter: 15-14, 26-20, 16-23, 22-25

Kaunas Sports Hall, Kaunas, Lithuania

July 11

China	76–76	Lithuania
Scoring by quarter: 28-23, 14-13, 18-21, 16-19

Beijing, China

July 12

Beijing Ducks	72–106	Lithuania
Scoring by quarter: 18-25, 17-29, 14-26, 26-23

Beijing, China

July 15

China	77–82 (OT)	Lithuania
Scoring by quarter: 19-10, 21-15, 19-21, 11-24, Overtime: 7-12

Xiamen, China

July 17

China	62–67	Lithuania
Scoring by quarter: 15-18, 11-24, 20-12, 24-13

Jiyuan, China

July 19

China	85–76	Lithuania
Scoring by quarter: 20-18, 12-26, 25-19, 19-22

Jincheng, China

August 12
20:15

Lithuania	77–75 (OT)	Latvia
Scoring by quarter: 17-15, 21-17, 10-13, 18-21, Overtime: 11-9

Kaunas Sports Hall, Kaunas, Lithuania

August 14
19:45

Latvia	81–79	Lithuania
Scoring by quarter: 25-23, 20-17, 19-17, 15-25

Arena Riga, Riga, Latvia

August 19
18:15

Lithuania	81–75	Slovenia
Scoring by quarter: 22-17, 21-18, 24-23, 14-17

Sevilla, Spain

August 20
18:15

Lithuania	97–62	Great Britain
Scoring by quarter: 28-10, 18-24, 23-15, 28-13

Sevilla, Spain

August 21
20:25

Spain	100–74	Lithuania
Scoring by quarter: 24-17, 32-23, 29-15, 15-19

Sevilla, Spain

August 24
19:00

Lithuania	78–61	Russia
Scoring by quarter: 23-18, 13-16, 26-13, 16-14

Athenes, Greece

August 25
19:00

Lithuania	70–78	Serbia
Scoring by quarter: 13-19, 18-19, 23-21, 16-19

Athenes, Greece

August 26
21:45

Greece	75–73	Lithuania
Scoring by quarter: 14-15, 20-19, 16-25, 25-14

Athenes, Greece

August 31
18:45

Lithuania	66–61	Russia
Scoring by quarter: 16:18, 21:11, 15:23, 14:9

Cido Arena, Panevėžys, Lithuania

September 3
20:30

Lithuania	94–72	Spain
Scoring by quarter: 23-18, 23-22, 26-19, 22-13

Siemens Arena, Vilnius, Lithuania

== Eurobasket 2009 ==
Note: All times are local

=== Preliminary round ===
September 7
21:15

Turkey	84–76	Lithuania
Scoring by quarter: 19–22, 20–17, 24–19, 21–18

Centennial Hall, Wrocław

September 8
18:15

Lithuania	75–86	Poland
Scoring by quarter: 23-25, 9-17, 18-18, 25-26

Centennial Hall, Wrocław

September 9
21:15

Lithuania	84–69	Bulgaria
Scoring by quarter: 25-22, 16-19, 16-15, 27-13

Centennial Hall, Wrocław

=== Qualifying round ===
September 12
21:00

Lithuania	58–81	Slovenia
Scoring by quarter: 18–28, 8–15, 13–19, 19–19

Atlas Arena, Łódź

September 14
15:45

Spain	84–70	Lithuania
Scoring by quarter: 15-24, 25-8, 24-11, 20-27

Atlas Arena, Łódź

September 16
15:45

Lithuania	79–89	Serbia
Scoring by quarter: 19–23, 18–18, 24–22, 18–26

Atlas Arena, Łódź
