= ULEB Cup 2007–08 Regular Season Group H =

These are the Group H Standings and Results:

Key to colors
Top three places in each group, plus five highest-ranked four-places teams, advance to Top 32
Eliminated

== Standings ==
	Team	Pld	W	L	PF	PA	Diff
1.	(Italy) Benetton Treviso	10	7	3	833	762	71
2.	(Ukraine) BC Kyiv	10	7	3	802	735	67
3.	(Bulgaria) Lukoil Academic	10	6	4	886	811	75
4.	(Germany) Artland Dragons	10	5	5	723	793	-70
5.	(Latvia) ASK Riga	10	3	7	723	728	-5
6.	(France) Pau-Orthez	10	2	8	692	830	-138

== Results/Fixtures ==
All times given below are in Central European Time.

=== Game 1 ===
November 5–6, 2007

November 5
19:00

ASK Riga (Latvia)	77–58	(Bulgaria) Lukoil Academic
Scoring by quarter: 12-14, 18-14, 31-16, 16-14

Riga

November 6
19:30

Artland Dragons (Germany)	85–74	(France) Pau-Orthez
Scoring by quarter: 17-20, 21-15, 18-16, 29-23

Quakenbrück

November 6
20:30

Benetton Treviso (Italy)	73–77	(Ukraine) BC Kyiv
Scoring by quarter: 11-16, 21-21, 22-14, 19-26

Treviso

=== Game 2 ===
November 13, 2007

November 13
17:00

Lukoil Academic (Bulgaria)	109–65	(Germany) Artland Dragons
Scoring by quarter: 32-24, 30-17, 22-7, 25-17

Sofia

November 13
18:00

BC Kyiv (Ukraine)	79–67	(Latvia) ASK Riga
Scoring by quarter: 16-16, 25-24, 20-8, 18-19

Kyiv

November 13
20:30

Pau-Orthez (France)	89–84	(Italy) Benetton Treviso
Scoring by quarter: 22-19, 18-20, 30-19, 19-26

Pau

=== Game 3 ===
November 20, 2007

November 20
19:00

BC Kyiv (Ukraine)	91–55	(France) Pau-Orthez
Scoring by quarter: 29-16, 17-12, 28-9, 17-18

Kyiv

November 20
19:30

Artland Dragons (Germany)	73–71	(Latvia) ASK Riga
Scoring by quarter: 15-13, 17-21, 21-18, 20-19

Quakenbrück

November 20
20:30

Benetton Treviso (Italy)	89–82	(Bulgaria) Lukoil Academic
Scoring by quarter: 21-30, 34-15, 18-23, 16-14

Treviso

=== Game 4 ===
November 27, 2007

November 27
17:00

Lukoil Academic (Bulgaria)	95–87	(Ukraine) BC Kyiv
Scoring by quarter: 32-31, 14-14, 21-21, 28-21

Sofia

November 27
19:00

ASK Riga (Latvia)	80–60	(France) Pau-Orthez
Scoring by quarter: 22-8, 14-14, 18-17, 26-21

Riga

November 27
19:30

Artland Dragons (Germany)	84–79	(Italy) Benetton Treviso
Scoring by quarter: 16-25, 15-19, 24-15, 29-20

Quakenbrück

=== Game 5 ===
December 4–5, 2007

December 4
19:00

BC Kyiv (Ukraine)	87–66	(Germany) Artland Dragons
Scoring by quarter: 22-18, 21-17, 26-11, 18-20

Kyiv

December 4
20:30

Benetton Treviso (Italy)	73–63	(Latvia) ASK Riga
Scoring by quarter: 15-15, 13-18, 22-21, 23-9

Treviso

December 5
20:30

Pau-Orthez (France)	73–78	(Bulgaria) Lukoil Academic
Scoring by quarter: 15-20, 22-19, 18-21, 18-18

Pau

=== Game 6 ===
December 11, 2007

December 11
17:00

Lukoil Academic (Bulgaria)	93–77	(Latvia) ASK Riga
Scoring by quarter: 30-22, 20-17, 25-18, 18-20

Sofia

December 11
19:00

BC Kyiv (Ukraine)	73–89	(Italy) Benetton Treviso
Scoring by quarter: 14-27, 21-16, 15-29, 23-17

Kyiv

December 11
20:30

Pau-Orthez (France)	61–79	(Germany) Artland Dragons
Scoring by quarter: 14-21, 16-23, 19-20, 12-15

Pau

=== Game 7 ===
December 18–19, 2007

December 18
19:30

Artland Dragons (Germany)	76–91	(Bulgaria) Lukoil Academic
Scoring by quarter: 24-22, 14-23, 21-24, 17-22

Quakenbrück

December 18
20:30

Benetton Treviso (Italy)	88–60	(France) Pau-Orthez
Scoring by quarter: 26-16, 23-12, 14-16, 25-16

Treviso

December 19
19:00

ASK Riga (Latvia)	72–81	(Ukraine) BC Kyiv
Scoring by quarter: 19-15, 19-16, 15-20, 19-30

Riga

=== Game 8 ===
January 8, 2008

January 8
17:00

Lukoil Academic (Bulgaria)	90–93	(Italy) Benetton Treviso
Scoring by quarter: 16-25, 23-20, 30-20, 21-28

Sofia

January 8
19:00

ASK Riga (Latvia)	70–60	(Germany) Artland Dragons
Scoring by quarter: 15-6, 14-13, 24-11, 17-30

Riga

January 8
20:30

Pau-Orthez (France)	63–73	(Ukraine) BC Kyiv
Scoring by quarter: 19-16, 9-24, 21-12, 14-21

Pau

=== Game 9 ===
January 15, 2008

January 15
19:00

BC Kyiv (Ukraine)	85–84	(Bulgaria) Lukoil Academic
Scoring by quarter: 23-13, 18-27, 21-24, 23-20

Kyiv

January 15
20:30

Benetton Treviso (Italy)	82–64	(Germany) Artland Dragons
Scoring by quarter: 22-11, 25-11, 18-20, 17-22

Treviso

January 15
20:30

Pau-Orthez (France)	68–66	(Latvia) ASK Riga
Scoring by quarter: 24-13, 13-13, 14-24, 17-16

Pau

=== Game 10 ===
January 22, 2008

January 22
19:00

Artland Dragons (Germany)	71–69	(Ukraine) BC Kyiv
Scoring by quarter: 22-13, 12-22, 20-16, 17-18

Quakenbrück

January 22
19:00

Lukoil Academic (Bulgaria)	106–89	(France) Pau-Orthez
Scoring by quarter: 29-19, 25-22, 30-24, 22-24

Sofia

January 22
19:00

ASK Riga (Latvia)	80–83	(Italy) Benetton Treviso
Scoring by quarter: 21-18, 20-20, 23-17, 16-28

Riga
