= 2014–15 Baltic Basketball League =

- Season: 2014–15
- Duration: October 14, 2014 – April 2, 2015
- Games played: 124
- Teams: 22
- TV partner: Viasat Sport Baltic

Regular season
- Top seed: Šiauliai

Finals
- Champions: (Lithuania) Šiauliai (2nd title)
- Runners-up: (Latvia) Ventspils
- Third place: (Lithuania) Juventus
- Fourth place: (Estonia) Tartu Ülikool/Rock
- Finals MVP: (Lithuania) Gintaras Leonavičius

Statistical leaders
Points	(United States) Brandis Raley-Ross	21.2
Rebounds	(Lithuania) Ronaldas Rutkauskas	10.4
Assists	(Greece) Nikos Gkikas	5.9
- All statistics correct as of April 3, 2015.

The 2014–15 Baltic Basketball League was the 11th season of the Baltic Basketball League.

This season’s competition included 8 teams from Estonia, 6 each from Latvia and Lithuania, and one team apiece representing Finland and Russia. For the regular season the teams were divided into three groups and competed in a round-robin competition system, with each team facing their opponent twice. Top four teams of each group and the best fifth placed team qualified for the eight-finals. The three teams who participated in FIBA EuroChallenge and Eurocup competitions – Šiauliai, Tartu Ülikool/Rock and Ventspils – begin their journey at the start of the play-offs, seeded respectively first, second and third based on last season’s results. All play-off games were played in home-and-away series.

In the Finals Lithuanian team Šiauliai defended their title by beating Latvian side Ventspils 156–150 on aggregate score. Third place belonged to Lithuanian side Juventus who beat Estonian team Tartu Ülikool/Rock with aggregate score of 125–123.

== Teams ==
Key to colors
Champion	Runner-up	Third place	Fourth place	Quarterfinalist	Top 16	Regular season

Country (League)	Teams	Teams (ranking in 2013–14 national championship)							
Estonia (KML)	8	Kalev/Cramo (1)	TÜ/Rock (2)	Rakvere Tarvas (3)	TLÜ/Kalev (4)	TTÜ (5)	Pärnu (6)	TYCO Rapla (7)	Valga/Maks & Moorits (8)
Latvia (LBL)	6	Ventspils (1)	Jēkabpils (3)	Jūrmala/Fēnikss (4)	Valmiera (5)	Liepāja/Triobet (6)	Barons/LDz (7)		
Lithuania (LKL)	6	Prienai (4)	Pieno žvaigždės (5)	Šiauliai (6)	Juventus (7)	Nevėžis (8)	Lietkabelis (9)		
Finland (Korisliiga)	1	Pyrintö (1)							
Russia (BSL)	1	Dynamo Moscow (7)							

=== Team information ===
Group	Team	Location	Arena	Head coach
Group A	Barons/LDz	Rīga, Latvia	Mārupe Sports Centre	(Latvia) Edgars Teteris
Group A	Jūrmala/Fēnikss	Jūrmala, Latvia	Lapmežciema Sports Centre	(Latvia) Arnis Vecvagars
Group A	Kalev/Cramo	Tallinn, Estonia	Tallinn Arena	(Estonia) Alar Varrak
Group A	Pärnu	Pärnu, Estonia	Pärnu Sports Hall	(Estonia) Mait Käbin
Group A	Pieno žvaigždės	Pasvalys, Lithuania	Pieno žvaigždės Arena	(Lithuania) Mantas Šernius
Group A	Pyrintö	Tampere, Finland	Pyynikin Palloiluhalli	(Finland) Pieti Poikola
Group B	Jēkabpils	Jēkabpils, Latvia	Jēkabpils Sporta Nams	(Latvia) Edmunds Valeiko
Group B	Valmiera	Valmiera, Latvia	Vidzeme Olympic Centre	(Latvia) Gatis Melderis
Group B	TLÜ/Kalev	Tallinn, Estonia	Kalev Sports Hall	(Estonia) Kalle Klandorf
Group B	Valga/Maks & Moorits	Valga, Estonia	Valga Sports Hall	(Latvia) Varis Krūmiņš
Group B	Lietkabelis	Panevėžys, Lithuania	Cido Arena	(Lithuania) Mindaugas Budzinauskas
Group B	Prienai	Prienai, Lithuania	Prienai Arena	(Lithuania) Tadas Stankevičius
Group B	TTÜ	Tallinn, Estonia	TTÜ Sports Hall	(Estonia) Heino Lill
Group C	Liepāja/Triobet	Liepāja, Latvia	Liepāja Olympic Centre	(Latvia) Uvis Helmanis
Group C	Rakvere Tarvas	Rakvere, Estonia	Rakvere Spordihall	(Estonia) Andres Sõber
Group C	TYCO Rapla	Rapla, Estonia	Sadolin Sports Hall	(Estonia) Aivar Kuusmaa
Group C	Juventus	Utena, Lithuania	Utena Arena	(Lithuania) Dainius Adomaitis
Group C	Nevėžis	Kėdainiai, Lithuania	Kėdainiai Arena	(Lithuania) Virginijus Sirvydis
Group C	Dynamo Moscow	Moscow, Russia	Krylatskoe Sport Palace	(Russia) Mikhail Solovyov
Starting from playoffs	Šiauliai	Šiauliai, Lithuania	Šiauliai Arena	(Lithuania) Gediminas Petrauskas
Starting from playoffs	TÜ/Rock	Tartu, Estonia	University of Tartu Sports Hall	(Estonia) Gert Kullamäe
Starting from playoffs	Ventspils	Ventspils, Latvia	Ventspils Olympic Centre	(Latvia) Roberts Štelmahers

== Regular season ==
The four best teams in each group and the best 5th placed team, which will be determined by place in the group; higher goal difference of all games in the group; higher number of goals in all games in the group, not accounting the games against the team placed 7th, will qualify for the 8th-finals.
Source: Changes in the BBL Regulations concerning the qualification for the Eighth-Finals

On 5 January 2015, Dynamo Moscow released an official statement announcing that the team will withdraw from the Baltic Basketball League, citing complicated economic situations and a tight match schedule. Results of all games played by Dynamo Moscow were nullified.
Source: Dynamo Moscow pull out from BBL

=== Group A ===
Pos	Team	Pld	W	L	PF	PA	PD	Pts	Qualification
1.	(Lithuania) Pieno žvaigždės	10	8	2	880	763	+117	18	Playoffs
2.	(Estonia) Kalev/Cramo	10	7	3	820	740	+80	17	Playoffs
3.	(Finland) Pyrintö	10	5	5	794	757	+37	15	Playoffs
4.	(Latvia) Barons/LDz	10	4	6	772	847	–75	14	Playoffs
5.	(Estonia) Pärnu	10	3	7	755	796	–41	13	Playoffs
6.	(Latvia) Jūrmala/Fēnikss	10	3	7	689	807	–118	13	Eliminated

=== Group B ===
Pos	Team	Pld	W	L	PF	PA	PD	Pts	Qualification
1.	(Latvia) Valmiera	12	10	2	952	848	+104	22	Playoffs
2.	(Lithuania) Lietkabelis	12	9	3	1059	875	+184	21	Playoffs
3.	(Latvia) Jēkabpils	12	9	3	905	836	+69	21	Playoffs
4.	(Lithuania) Prienai	12	5	7	917	898	+19	17	Playoffs
5.	(Estonia) TTÜ	12	4	8	830	964	–134	16	Eliminated
6.	(Estonia) Valga/Maks & Moorits	12	4	8	902	962	–60	16	Eliminated
7.	(Estonia) TLÜ/Kalev	12	1	11	808	990	–182	13	Eliminated

=== Group C ===
Pos	Team	Pld	W	L	PF	PA	PD	Pts	Qualification
1.	(Lithuania) Juventus	8	7	1	679	552	+127	15	Playoffs
2.	(Latvia) Liepāja/Triobet	8	6	2	659	610	+49	14	Playoffs
3.	(Estonia) Rakvere Tarvas	8	4	4	630	634	–4	12	Playoffs
4.	(Estonia) TYCO Rapla	8	3	5	575	634	–59	11	Playoffs
5.	(Lithuania) Nevėžis	8	0	8	556	669	–113	8	Eliminated
6.	(Russia) Dynamo Moscow	Withdrew							Eliminated

== Playoffs ==
=== Bracket ===
Eightfinals; January 29, 2015 – February 12, 2015
1	(Lithuania) Šiauliai	108	82	190
16	(Estonia) Pärnu	71	70	141
8	(Lithuania) Lietkabelis	64	96	160
9	(Estonia) Kalev/Cramo	78	75	153
4	(Lithuania) Juventus	58	84	142
13	(Latvia) Barons/LDz	82	58	140
5	(Lithuania) Pieno žvaigždės	94	89	183
12	(Estonia) Rakvere Tarvas	87	68	155
2	(Estonia) TÜ/Rock	100	73	173
15	(Lithuania) Prienai	68	67	135
7	(Latvia) Liepāja/Triobet	67	105	172
10	(Latvia) Jēkabpils	62	83	145
3	(Latvia) Ventspils	105	70	175
14	(Estonia) TYCO Rapla	75	55	130
6	(Latvia) Valmiera	73	84	157
11	(Finland) Pyrintö	107	78	185

Quarterfinals; February 25, 2015 – March 5, 2015
1	(Lithuania) Šiauliai	103	78	181
8	(Lithuania) Lietkabelis	81	66	147
4	(Lithuania) Juventus	65	85	150
5	(Lithuania) Pieno žvaigždės	76	65	141
2	(Estonia) TÜ/Rock	59	71	130
7	(Latvia) Liepāja/Triobet	49	71	120
3	(Latvia) Ventspils	70	78	148
11	(Finland) Pyrintö	64	59	123

Semifinals; March 11, 2015 – March 22, 2015
1	(Lithuania) Šiauliai	73	60	133
4	(Lithuania) Juventus	69	60	129
2	(Estonia) TÜ/Rock	49	72	121
3	(Latvia) Ventspils	74	76	150

Finals; March 25, 2015 – April 1, 2015
1	(Lithuania) Šiauliai	68	88	156
3	(Latvia) Ventspils	70	80	150

== Player statistics ==
Players qualify to this category by having at least 50% games played.
Source: Baltic Basketball League player statistics (2014–15)

=== Points ===
Rank	Player	Team	Games	Points	Average
1.	(United States) Brandis Raley-Ross	(Estonia) Rakvere Tarvas	11	233	21.18
2.	(United States) Justin Hurt	(Latvia) Valmiera	8	155	19.38
3.	(Lithuania) Ronaldas Rutkauskas	(Estonia) Pärnu	9	168	18.67
4.	(Latvia) Jurijs Aleksejevs	(Estonia) Valga/Maks & Moorits	12	212	17.67
5.	(Estonia) Joonas Järveläinen	(Estonia) TTÜ	10	169	16.90

=== Assists ===
Rank	Player	Team	Games	Assists	Average
1.	(Greece) Nikos Gkikas	(Latvia) Ventspils	8	47	5.88
2.	(Lithuania) Paulius Ivanauskas	(Lithuania) Prienai	14	74	5.29
3.	(Lithuania) Vytenis Čižauskas	(Latvia) Valmiera	12	61	5.08
4.	(United States) Kyle Lamonte	(Lithuania) Pieno žvaigždės	7	35	5.00
5.	(Lithuania) Andrius Mažutis	(Latvia) Liepāja/Triobet	14	69	4.93

=== Rebounds ===
Rank	Player	Team	Games	Rebounds	Average
1.	(Lithuania) Ronaldas Rutkauskas	(Estonia) Pärnu	9	94	10.44
2.	(Latvia) Jurijs Aleksejevs	(Estonia) Valga/Maks & Moorits	12	125	10.42
3.	(Latvia) Kaspars Cipruss	(Latvia) Barons/LDz	7	68	9.71
4.	(United States) Damon Williams	(Finland) Pyrintö	14	127	9.07
5.	(Lithuania) Robertas Grabauskas	(Estonia) TLÜ/Kalev	12	105	8.75

=== Efficiency ===
Rank	Name	Team	Games	Efficiency	Average
1.	(Lithuania) Ronaldas Rutkauskas	(Estonia) Pärnu	9	202	22.44
2.	(Latvia) Jurijs Aleksejevs	(Estonia) Valga/Maks & Moorits	12	234	19.50
3.	(Estonia) Janar Talts	(Estonia) TÜ/Rock	8	152	19.00
4.	(United States) Brandis Raley-Ross	(Estonia) Rakvere Tarvas	11	209	19.00
5.	(United States) Damon Williams	(Finland) Pyrintö	14	252	18.00

== Awards ==
=== MVP of the Month ===
Month	Player	Team	Ref.
October 2014	(Latvia) Kristers Zeidaks	(Estonia) TYCO Rapla	
November 2014	(Latvia) Rolands Freimanis	(Estonia) Kalev/Cramo	
December 2014	(Lithuania) Ronaldas Rutkauskas	(Estonia) Pärnu	
January 2015	(Lithuania) Laimonas Kisielius	(Lithuania) Pieno žvaigždės	
February 2015	(Lithuania) Evaldas Kairys	(Lithuania) Pieno žvaigždės	

Last updated: March 3, 2015.
Source: BBL Homepage
