= Artūrs Strēlnieks =

Latvian basketball player

No. 11 – Rigas Ekselences juniori
- Title: Assistant coach
- League: LBL; LEBL

Personal information
- Born: 31 July 1985 (age 41) Talsi, Latvia
- Listed height: 1.96 m (6 ft 5 in)
- Listed weight: 96 kg (212 lb)

Career information
- Playing career: 2009–2026
- Position: Power forward
- Coaching career: 2026–present

Career history

Playing
- 2004–2007: BK Roja
- 2007–2009: BK Ķeizarmežs
- 2009–2012: BK Ventspils
- 2012–2016: VEF Rīga
- 2016–2018: BK Jūrmala/Fēnikss
- 2018–2023: Gulbenes Buki
- 2023–2024: Rīgas Zeļļi
- 2024–2025: Gulbenes Buki
- 2025–2026: BK Talsi

Coaching
- 2026–present: Rigas Ekselences juniori

Career highlights
- 2x LBL champion (2013, 2015)

Artūrs Strēlnieks (born 31 July 1985) is a Latvian professional basketball player, who plays the power forward position. He currently plays for Gulbenes Buki.

== Professional career ==
After bouncing around couple of semi-pro teams, Artūrs Strēlnieks started his pro career at age 24 when he was signed by BK Ventspils in September 2009.

He played next three years for Ventspils establishing himself as a solid player that excels on defensive end.

In July 2012, Artūrs moved to VEF Rīga. In April 2014, he was signed to a three-year extension. On 19 July 2016 he signed with the Latvian team Jūrmala/Fēnikss.

After playing at the highest level, in 2018, Artūrs joined the 2nd division, National League club, Gulbenes Buki and helped them get 4th place in 2022 and bronze in 2023. After that, in September of 2023 Artūrs joined the new team - Rīgas Zeļļi where he was the most experienced player at the time and helped the team in its early stages. In November of 2024, he rejoined Gulbenes Buki and plays there as a power forward.

== Personal life ==
His younger brother, Jānis, is also a professional basketball player.
