= Uģis =

- Gender: Male
- Name day: 17 November

Origin
- Origin: Variant form of Hugo
- Region of origin: Latvia

Uģis is a Latvian masculine given name and may refer to:

- Uģis Brūvelis (born 1971), Latvian race walker
- Uģis Lasmanis (born 1967), Latvian rower
- Uģis Pinete (born 1991), Latvian basketball player
- Uģis Prauliņš (born 1957), Latvian composer
- Uģis Viļums (born 1979), Latvian basketball player
- Uģis Žaļims (born 1986), Latvian bobsledder
