= Ronaldas Rutkauskas =

Lithuanian basketball player

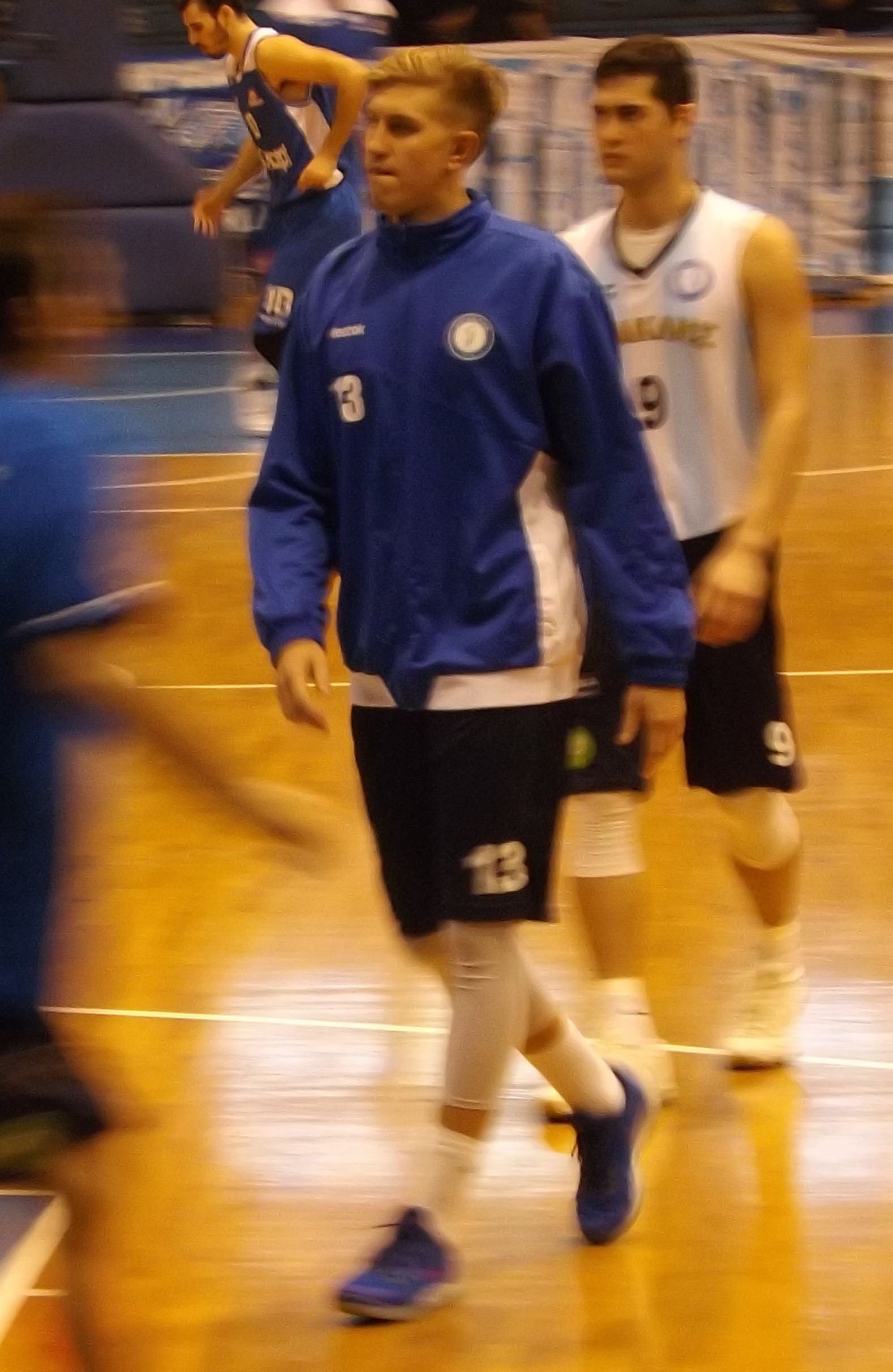
- Rutkauskas warming up for Iraklis Thessaloniki in 2016.

No. 33 – Delikatesas
- Position: Power forward
- League: National Basketball League

Personal information
- Born: 3 March 1992 (age 34) Kaunas, Lithuania
- Listed height: 2.03 m (6 ft 8 in)
- Listed weight: 98 kg (216 lb)

Career information
- Playing career: 2009–present

Career history
- 2009–2011: 08 Stockholm
- 2011–2012: Tsmoki-Minsk II
- 2013: Stockholm Eagles
- 2013: ETHA Engomis
- 2013–2014: Ourense
- 2014: BC Jazz Kaunas
- 2014–2015: Pärnu
- 2015–2016: Jēkabpils
- 2016–2017: Iraklis Thessaloniki
- 2017–2018: CEP Lorient
- 2018–2019: Iraklis Thessaloniki
- 2019–2020: Koroivos Amaliadas
- 2020–2021: CEP Lorient
- 2021–2022: Þór Þorlákshöfn
- 2022–2023: Andrézieux-Bouthéon Loire Sud Basket
- 2023–2024: Delikatesas
- 2024: Alytaus Alytus
- 2025–: Delikatesas

Career highlights
- Icelandic Super Cup winner (2021); Greek 2nd Division Top Rebounder (2019); BBL Best Rebounder Award (2015); Belarus Premier League Top Scorer (2012)

Ronaldas Rutkauskas (born 3 March 1992) is a Lithuanian professional basketball player representing BC Delikatesas of the National Basketball League. Born in Kaunas, he started his professional career in Sweden with 08 Stockholm. Rutkauskas received the BBL Best Rebounder Award in 2015 while playing for Pärnu and was the leading scorer of the Belarus Premier League in 2012.

Rutkauskas has represented Lithuania at junior levels.

== Professional career ==
Born in Kaunas in 1992, Rutkauskas started playing basketball at a very young age in the basketball academies of Arvydas Sabonis. His professional started career in 2009 with Swedish team 08 Stockholm, before joining Belarusian team Tsmoki-Minsk in 2011. Rutkauskas while playing for Tsmoki-Minsk II in the Belarus Premier League, led the league in scoring for the 2011–12 season with 19.6 points and had the second-best record with 9.4 rebounds per game in 30 games, also setting the season-high for scoring in a game as he scored 38 points against Rubon Vitebsk. He improved his numbers the next season to 21.5 points and 10.2 rebounds per game, before in January 2013, he agreed terms with Swedish team Stockholm Eagles. Rutkauskas joined Cypriot club ETHA Engomis in September 2013, before moving to Spain to play for LEB Oro team Ourense.

Rutkauskas joined Pärnu for the 2014–15 season, scoring 8 points and grabbing 10 rebounds in his debut against TU/Rock. He was named BBL's Most Valuable Player for December, while he also received the BBL Best Rebounder Award at the end of the season. In October 2015, he signed for Jēkabpils in Latvia. While at Jēkabpils he was named BBL's Most Valuable Player for January 2016, by averaging 15.5 points, 11 rebounds, and 1.3 steals, earning the honor for the second time in his career. In July 2016, Rutkauskas agreed a contract with Greek A2 team Iraklis Thessaloniki. He finished his season with 11.4 points and 7 rebounds per game, appearing in all but one regular season games.

In July 2021, Rutkauskas signed with reigning Icelandic champions Þór Þorlákshöfn. On 2 October 2021, he had 23 points and 12 rebounds in Þór's 113–100 win against Njarðvík in the Icelandic Super Cup.

=== Professional career statistics ===
==== Baltic Basketball League ====
Legend
GP	Games played	GS	Games started	MPG	Minutes per game
FG%	Field goal percentage	3P%	3-point field goal percentage	FT%	Free throw percentage
RPG	Rebounds per game	APG	Assists per game	SPG	Steals per game
BPG	Blocks per game	PPG	Points per game	**Bold**	Career high

Led the league

Year	Team	GP	GS	MPG	FG%	3P%	FT%	RPG	APG	SPG	BPG	PPG
2014–15	Pärnu	9	9	**32.6**	.571	.200	**.733**	**10.4**	**2.1**	0.9	0.3	18.7
2015–16	BK Jēkabpils	**13**	**13**	30.7	**.608**	**1.000**	.690	9.3	1.0	**1.0**	**0.4**	13.8
Career		22	22	31.5	.587	.273	.701	9.8	1.5	1.0	0.4	15.8

== International career ==
Rutkauskas was in the preselection squad of Lithuania under-19 for the 2011 FIBA Under-19 World Championship. He scored 5 points in a friendly game against LKKA Atletas, before being cut off the tournament's final squad. He was also in the preselection of Lithuania under-20 for the 2012 FIBA Europe Under-20 Championship.
