= 2011–12 Euroleague Regular Season Group A =

Standings and Results for Group A of the regular season phase of the 2011–12 Euroleague basketball tournament.

== Standings ==
Key to colors
Top four places in each group advance to Top 16

	Team	Pld	W	L	PF	PA	Diff	Tie-break
1.	(Turkey) Fenerbahçe Ülker	10	6	4	785	758	+27	1−1 (+9)
2.	(Greece) Olympiacos	10	6	4	782	757	+25	1−1 (−9)
3.	(Italy) Bennet Cantù	10	5	5	724	744	−20	3−1 (+3)
4.	(Spain) Gescrap Bizkaia	10	5	5	776	755	+21	2−2 (−1)
5.	(Spain) Caja Laboral	10	5	5	792	755	+37	1−3 (−2)
6.	(France) Nancy	10	3	7	743	833	−90	

== Fixtures and results ==
All times given below are in Central European Time.

=== Game 1 ===
19 October 2011
19:00

Report

Fenerbahçe Ülker (Turkey)	66–69	(Spain) Caja Laboral
Scoring by quarter: 20–12, 16–22, 12–19, 18–16
Pts: Onan 16; Rebs: Gist, Savaş 7 Asts: Ukić 2		Pts: Teletović 23; Rebs: Seraphin, Teletović 6 Asts: Prigioni 7

Abdi İpekçi Arena, Istanbul
Attendance: 3,500
Referees: Luigi Lamonica (ITA), Milivoje Jovcic (SRB), Ioannis Foufis (GRE)

19 October 2011
20:45

Report

Bennet Cantù (Italy)	80–69	(France) SLUC Nancy
Scoring by quarter: 17–21, 27–23, 13–8, 23–17
Pts: Cinciarini 15; Rebs: Leunen, Shermadini 6 Asts: Basile 6		Pts: Akingbala 20; Rebs: Akingbala, Batum 7 Asts: Batum 8

Palasport di Desio, Desio
Attendance: 4,074
Referees: Sasa Pukl (SLO), Borys Ryzhyk (UKR), Oscar Perea (ESP)

21 October 2011
20:30

Report

Gescrap Bizkaia (Spain)	76–61	(Greece) Olympiacos
Scoring by quarter: 18–11, 19–20, 23–18, 16–12
Pts: Banić 22; Rebs: Fischer 8 Asts: Jackson 5		Pts: Gecevičius 15; Rebs: Hines 4 Asts: Hines, Papadopoulos 3

Bilbao Arena, Bilbao
Attendance: 8,432
Referees: Carl Jungebrand (FIN), Damir Javor (SLO), Petri Mantyla (FIN)

=== Game 2 ===
26 October 2011
20:00

Report

Caja Laboral (Spain)	81–69	(Italy) Bennet Cantù
Scoring by quarter: 26–27, 18–18, 17–15, 20–10
Pts: Teletović 22; Rebs: Seraphin, San Emeterio 7 Asts: Prigioni, Bjelica 4		Pts: Micov 14; Rebs: Marconato, Shermadini 5 Asts: Micov 5

Iradier Arena, Vitoria-Gasteiz
Attendance: 7,923
Referees: Christos Christodoulou (GRE), Jakub Zamojski (POL), Zdravko Rutesic (MNE)

27 October 2011
20:45

Report

Olympiacos (Greece)	81–74	(Turkey) Fenerbahçe Ülker
Scoring by quarter: 12–14, 14–23, 27–17, 28–20
Pts: Spanoulis 22; Rebs: Antić 12; Asts: Spanoulis 7		Pts: Sefolosha 17; Rebs: Sefolosha 12; Asts: Preldžič 7

Peace and Friendship Stadium, Piraeus
Attendance: 3,000
Referees: Dani Hierrezuelo (ESP), Paolo Taurino (ITA), Sergiy Chebyshev (UKR)

27 October 2011
20:45

Report

SLUC Nancy (France)	87–73	(Spain) Gescrap Bizkaia
Scoring by quarter: 17–18, 21–20, 23–20, 26–15
Pts: Batum 26; Rebs: Akingbala 9 Asts: Batum 8		Pts: Banić 16; Rebs: Jackson, Hervelle 6 Asts: Jackson, Fischer 4

Palais des Sports Jean Weille, Nancy
Attendance: 5,613
Referees: Dubravko Muhvic (CRO), Oliver Krause (GER), Apostolos Kalpakas (SWE)

=== Game 3 ===
2 November 2011
20:00

Report

Caja Laboral (Spain)	81–79	(Greece) Olympiacos
Scoring by quarter: 13–22, 19–18, 28–26, 21–13
Pts: Teletović 20; Rebs: Seraphin, Teletović 5 Asts: Prigioni 3		Pts: Spanoulis 19; Rebs: Papadopoulos 8 Asts: Spanoulis 7

Fernando Buesa Arena, Vitoria-Gasteiz
Attendance: 8,252
Referees: Grzegorz Ziemblicki (POL), Robert Lottermoser (GER), Tomas Jasevicius (LTU)

3 November 2011
18:45

Report

Fenerbahçe Ülker (Turkey)	90–86	(France) SLUC Nancy
Scoring by quarter: 23–17, 32–17, 15–27, 20–25
Pts: Sefolosha 19; Rebs: Sefolosha 5 Asts: Preldžič 12		Pts: Samnick 24; Rebs: Moerman 15; Asts: Linehan 15

Abdi İpekçi Arena, Istanbul
Attendance: 5,600
Referees: Zoran Sutulovic (MNE), Srdan Dozai (CRO), Sergey Mikhaylov (RUS)

3 November 2011
20:45

Report

Bennet Cantù (Italy)	78–69	(Spain) Gescrap Bizkaia
Scoring by quarter: 18–15, 24–16, 18–19, 18–19
Pts: Shermadini 16; Rebs: Shermadini 6 Asts: Cinciarini 6		Pts: Mumbrú 20; Rebs: Hervelle 5 Asts: López 5

Palasport di Desio, Desio
Attendance: 4,309
Referees: Recep Ankarali (TUR), Matej Boltauzer (SVN), Nicola Maestre (FRA)

=== Game 4 ===
9 November 2011
20:45

Report

Bennet Cantù (Italy)	64–63	(Greece) Olympiacos
Scoring by quarter: 12–16, 19–18, 14–15, 19–14
Pts: Leunen 12; Rebs: Leunen, Marconato 6 Asts: Cinciarini 6		Pts: Spanoulis 23; Rebs: Papanikolaou 6 Asts: Spanoulis 3

Palasport di Desio, Desio
Attendance: 5,328
Referees: Emilio Perez Pizarro (ESP), Antonio Conde (ESP), Tomasz Trawicki (POL)

9 November 2011
20:45

Report

Gescrap Bizkaia (Spain)	70–73	(Turkey) Fenerbahçe Ülker
Scoring by quarter: 21–26, 15–6, 22–21, 12–20
Pts: Banić 17; Rebs: Banić, Mumbrú 5 Asts: Fischer 5		Pts: Bogdanović 19; Rebs: Preldžič 8 Asts: Preldžič 3

Bilbao Arena, Bilbao
Attendance: 7,523
Referees: Ilija Belosevic (SRB), Jakub Zamojski (POL), Enrico Sabetta (ITA)

10 November 2011
20:45

Report

SLUC Nancy (France)	90–85	(Spain) Caja Laboral
Scoring by quarter: 28–20, 21–27, 21–17, 20–21
Pts: Akingbala 26; Rebs: Batum 9 Asts: Shuler, Batum 4		Pts: Teletović 24; Rebs: Teletović 13; Asts: Prigioni, San Emeterio 6

Palais des Sports Jean Weille, Nancy
Attendance: 6,027
Referees: Spiros Gkontas (GRE), Olegs Latisevs (LAT), Renaud Geller (BEL)

=== Game 5 ===
16 November 2011
19:15

Report

Fenerbahçe Ülker (Turkey)	85–83 (OT)	(Italy) Bennet Cantù
Scoring by quarter: 17–19, 15–16, 24–17, 17–21, Overtime: 12–10
Pts: Onan 18; Rebs: Sefolosha 7 Asts: Ukić, Preldžič 2		Pts: Mazzarino, Basile 12; Rebs: three players 6 Asts: Markoishvili, Micov 3

Abdi İpekçi Arena, Istanbul
Attendance: 8,355
Referees: J.R. Garcia Ortiz (ESP), Eddie Viator (FRA), Moritz Reiter (GER)

16 November 2011
20:00

Report

Caja Laboral (Spain)	84–89	(Spain) Gescrap Bizkaia
Scoring by quarter: 17–25, 19–16, 26–25, 22–23
Pts: Teletović 26; Rebs: Teletović 8 Asts: Prigioni 4		Pts: Vasileiadis 21; Rebs: Fischer 7 Asts: Fisher 4

Fernando Buesa Arena, Vitoria-Gasteiz
Attendance: 8,460
Referees: Guerrino Cerebuch (ITA), Milija Vojinovic (SRB), Panagiotis Anastopoulos (GRE)

16 November 2011
21:00

Report

Olympiacos (Greece)	91–78	(France) SLUC Nancy
Scoring by quarter: 30–22, 10–14, 27–16, 24–26
Pts: Spanoulis 26; Rebs: Papadopoulos 9 Asts: Papadopoulos 7		Pts: Moerman 20; Rebs: Moerman, Batum 6 Asts: Shuler, Batum 2

Peace and Friendship Stadium, Piraeus
Attendance: 3,500
Referees: Jose Martín (ESP), Marek Cmikiewicz (POL), Zdravko Rutesic (MNE)

=== Game 6 ===
23 November 2011
18:00

Report

Olympiacos (Greece)	88–81	(Spain) Gescrap Bizkaia
Scoring by quarter: 27–24, 18–18, 15–19, 28–20
Pts: Spanoulis 29; Rebs: Hines 7 Asts: Spanoulis 6		Pts: Mumbrú 17; Rebs: Fischer 7 Asts: three players 4

Peace and Friendship Stadium, Piraeus
Attendance: 3,000
Referees: Luigi Lamonica (ITA), Eddie Viator (FRA), Radomir Vojinovic (MNE)

24 November 2011
20:45

Report

SLUC Nancy (France)	76–75	(Italy) Bennet Cantù
Scoring by quarter: 16–20, 29–13, 11–29, 20–13
Pts: Amagou 18; Rebs: Akingbala 10; Asts: Batum 3		Pts: Leunen 18; Rebs: Leunen 9 Asts: Basile 6

Palais des Sports Jean Weille, Nancy
Attendance: 5,715
Referees: Fernando Rocha (POR), Milivoje Jovcic (SRB), Jurgis Laurinavicius (LTU)

24 November 2011
20:45

Report

Caja Laboral (Spain)	90–85 (OT)	(Turkey) Fenerbahçe Ülker
Scoring by quarter: 16–14, 22–28, 16–18, 19–13, Overtime: 17–12
Pts: San Emeterio 25; Rebs: San Emeterio 8 Asts: Seraphin 4		Pts: Bogdanović 19; Rebs: Sefolosha 7 Asts: Sefolosha 4

Fernando Buesa Arena, Vitoria-Gasteiz
Attendance: 8,144
Referees: Carl Jungebrand (FIN), Boris Ryzhyk (UKR), Nicola Maestre (FRA)

=== Game 7 ===
30 November 2011
21:00

Report

Gescrap Bizkaia (Spain)	97–75	(France) SLUC Nancy
Scoring by quarter: 22–22, 18–17, 29–23, 28–13
Pts: Mumbrú 15; Rebs: Vasileiadis, Grimau 5 Asts: Jackson, López 5		Pts: Shuler 19; Rebs: Akingbala 5 Asts: Linehan 4

Bilbao Arena, Bilbao
Attendance: 7,436
Referees: Robert Lottermoser (GER), Srdan Dozai (CRO), Oskars Lucis (LAT)

1 December 2011
19:00

Report

Fenerbahçe Ülker (Turkey)	86–70	(Greece) Olympiacos
Scoring by quarter: 16–17, 26–19, 17–20, 27–14
Pts: Jerrells 17; Rebs: Gist 7 Asts: Jerrells 5		Pts: Hines 14; Rebs: Hines 7 Asts: Spanoulis, Printezis 4

Sinan Erdem Dome, Istanbul
Attendance: 14,680
Referees: Guerrino Cerebuch (ITA), M. A. Perez Perez (ESP), Vicente Bulto (ESP)

1 December 2011
20:45

Report

Bennet Cantù (Italy)	71–68	(Spain) Caja Laboral
Scoring by quarter: 12–21, 23–9, 17–6, 19–32
Pts: Basile 18; Rebs: Marconato 10; Asts: Markoishvili 3		Pts: Teletović 24; Rebs: Dorsey 6 Asts: Prigioni, San Emeterio 5

Palasport di Desio, Desio
Attendance: 6,004
Referees: Christos Christodoulou (GRE), Matej Boltauzer (SLO), Luis Lopes (POR)

=== Game 8 ===
7 December 2011
20:30

Report

Gescrap Bizkaia (Spain)	64–67	(Italy) Bennet Cantù
Scoring by quarter: 14–17, 13–23, 20–14, 17–13
Pts: Banić 16; Rebs: Fischer, Banić 5 Asts: Jackson 4		Pts: Micov 13; Rebs: Marconato 6 Asts: three players 2

Bilbao Arena, Bilbao
Attendance: 8,169
Referees: Carl Jungebrand (FIN), Sinisa Herceg (CRO), Renaud Geller (BEL)

7 December 2011
21:00

Report

SLUC Nancy (France)	53–73	(Turkey) Fenerbahçe Ülker
Scoring by quarter: 15–22, 10–10, 15–17, 13–24
Pts: Shuler 17; Rebs: Akingbala 9 Asts: Linehan 4		Pts: Gist 16; Rebs: Peker, Gist 7 Asts: Preldžič 5

Palais des Sports Jean Weille, Nancy
Attendance: 6,027
Referees: Paolo Taurino (ITA), Matej Boltauzer (SLO), J.C. Garcia Gonzalez (ESP)

8 December 2011
21:00

Report

Olympiacos (Greece)	84–82	(Spain) Caja Laboral
Scoring by quarter: 19–26, 27–15, 19–21, 19–20
Pts: Spanoulis 21; Rebs: Hines, Printezis 6 Asts: Spanoulis 5		Pts: Teletović 32; Rebs: Teletović 7 Asts: Prigioni 6

Peace and Friendship Stadium, Piraeus
Attendance: 4,000
Referees: Fernando Rocha (POR), Tolga Sahin (ITA), Olegs Latisevs (LAT)

=== Game 9 ===
14 December 2011
21:00

Report

Caja Laboral (Spain)	90–55	(France) SLUC Nancy
Scoring by quarter: 22–11, 20–10, 29–9, 19–25
Pts: Teletović 22; Rebs: Golubović, Dorsey 8 Asts: Prigioni 5		Pts: Gregory 15; Rebs: three players 5 Asts: Grant 4

Fernando Buesa Arena, Vitoria-Gasteiz
Attendance: 7,943
Referees: Luigi Lamonica (ITA), Tomas Jasevicius (LTU), Sergio Silva (POR)

15 December 2011
19:00

Report

Fenerbahçe Ülker (Turkey)	70–80	(Spain) Gescrap Bizkaia
Scoring by quarter: 14–25, 19–19, 17–23, 20–13
Pts: Preldžič 19; Rebs: Preldžič 7 Asts: Jerrells 4		Pts: Fischer 16; Rebs: Fischer 10; Asts: Jackson 6

Sinan Erdem Dome, Istanbul
Attendance: 11,280
Referees: Sasa Pukl (SLO), Borys Ryzhyk (UKR), Milija Vojinovic (SRB)

15 December 2011
20:00

Report

Olympiacos (Greece)	86–61	(Italy) Bennet Cantù
Scoring by quarter: 18–12, 20–17, 25–15, 23–17
Pts: Spanoulis 22; Rebs: Antic 6 Asts: Spanoulis 5		Pts: Micov 17; Rebs: Shermadini 6 Asts: Basile 3

Peace and Friendship Stadium, Piraeus
Attendance: 4,000
Referees: Juan Carlos Arteaga (ESP), Emilio Perez Pizarro (ESP), Boris Shulga (UKR)

=== Game 10 ===
22 December 2011
20:00

Report

Gescrap Bizkaia (Spain)	77–72	(Spain) Caja Laboral
Scoring by quarter: 20–20, 20–14, 18–18, 19–20
Pts: Banić 18; Rebs: three players 5 Asts: Mumbrú 4		Pts: Bjelica 15; Rebs: Bjelica, Teletović 7 Asts: Prigioni 4

Bilbao Arena, Bilbao
Attendance: 10,014
Referees: Grzegorz Ziemblicki (POL), Nicola Maestre (FRA), Eddie Viator (FRA)

22 December 2011
20:00

Report

SLUC Nancy (France)	74–79	(Greece) Olympiacos
Scoring by quarter: 27–21, 17–26, 20–14, 10–18
Pts: Shuler 18; Rebs: Shuler 9 Asts: Linehan, Shuler 3		Pts: Antic 20; Rebs: Hines 12; Asts: Mantzaris 4

Palais des Sports Jean Weille, Nancy
Attendance: 5,268
Referees: Daniel Hierrezuelo (ESP), Boris Ryzhyk (UKR), Jakub Zamojski (POL)

22 December 2011
20:00

Report

Bennet Cantù (Italy)	76–83	(Turkey) Fenerbahçe Ülker
Scoring by quarter: 16–17, 15–14, 24–24, 21–28
Pts: Leunen, Shermadini 13; Rebs: Micov 6 Asts: Micov 4		Pts: Savaş 21; Rebs: Three players 6 Asts: Preldžič 5

Palasport di Desio, Desio
Attendance: 6,067
Referees: Jose Martín (ESP), Milivoje Jovcic (SRB), Luis Lopes (POR)
