= Michael Ansley =

American basketball player (born 1967)

Personal information
- Born: February 8, 1967 (age 59) Birmingham, Alabama, U.S.
- Listed height: 6 ft 7 in (2.01 m)
- Listed weight: 225 lb (102 kg)

Career information
- High school: Jackson-Olin (Birmingham, Alabama)
- College: Alabama (1985–1989)
- NBA draft: 1989: 2nd round, 37th overall pick
- Drafted by: Orlando Magic
- Playing career: 1989–2009
- Position: Power forward
- Number: 45, 54

Career history
- 1989–1991: Orlando Magic
- 1991: Birmingham Bandits
- 1991–1992: Philadelphia 76ers
- 1992: Charlotte Hornets
- 1992–1993: Unicaja-Mayoral Málaga
- 1993–1994: Hapoel Galil Elyon
- 1994–1996: Unicaja-Mayoral Málaga
- 1996–1997: Cáceres C.B.
- 1997–2000: Darussafaka S.K.
- 2000–2001: Club Ourense Baloncesto
- 2001–2002: Prokom Trefl Sopot
- 2004–2005: Wisła Kraków
- 2005–2006: Turów Zgorzelec
- 2005–2007: Stal Ostrów Wielkopolski
- 2007–2008: Basket Kwidzyn
- 2008–2009: Polonia Warszawa
- 2009: Sportino Inowrocław

Career highlights
- Spanish League Finals MVP (1995); Turkish League Top Scorer (1998); Polish League Top Scorer (2005); First-team All-SEC (1989)
- Stats at NBA.com
- Stats at Basketball Reference

Michael Antonio Ansley (born February 8, 1967) is an American former professional basketball player. He played three seasons in the National Basketball Association (NBA) and last played with Sportino Inowrocław of the Polish Dominet Bank Ekstraliga.

== College career ==
A 6-foot-7-inch (201 cm), 225-pound (102 kg) forward, Ansley played college basketball at the University of Alabama.

== Professional career ==
Ansley was selected by the Orlando Magic in the second round (37th overall) of the 1989 NBA draft. He played three years in the NBA for the Magic, Philadelphia 76ers and Charlotte Hornets. His best year in the NBA came during his rookie season as a member of the Magic, appearing in 72 games, and averaging 8.7 points and 5.0 rebounds per game.

After leaving the NBA, he played in various clubs in Israel, Spain, Turkey, and Poland.
