= Mārtiņš Kravčenko =

Latvian basketball player (born 1985)

No. 33 – BK Jēkabpils
- Position: Guard
- League: Latvian Basketball League; Baltic Basketball League

Personal information
- Born: July 16, 1985 (age 41) Jurmala, Latvia
- Listed height: 1.94 m (6 ft 4 in)
- Listed weight: 91 kg (201 lb)

Career information
- Playing career: 2002–present

Career history
- 2002–2009: Barons LMT
- 2009–2012: Liepājas Lauvas
- 2012–2013: MBC Mykolaiv
- 2013–2014: Jēkabpils

Career highlights
- FIBA EuroCup champion (2008)

Mārtiņš Kravčenko (born July 16, 1985 in Jurmala, Latvia) is a former Latvian professional basketball player who plays the guard position and plays for Latvian Basketball League club BK Jēkabpils. Most of his career he spent at BK Barons which in 2008 won the Latvian Basketball League and FIBA EuroCup championships.

== Career ==
Kravčenko began his professional basketball career with BK Barons, where he spent most of his playing years. In 2008 with the team he won the Latvian Basketball League (LBL) championship and the FIBA EuroCup. In addition to his time at BK Barons, Mārtiņš Kravčenko played for BK Nīca and BK Jēkabpils.
