= Matīss Kulačkovskis =

Latvian basketball player

No. 77 – Veertien Mie
- Position: Power forward
- League: B.League

Personal information
- Born: October 1, 1997 (age 27); Saldus, Latvia
- Listed height: 6 ft 9 in (2.06 m)
- Listed weight: 215 lb (98 kg)

Career information
- High school: Archbishop Ryan (Philadelphia, Pennsylvania)
- College: Bowling Green (2018–2022)
- NBA draft: 2022: undrafted
- Playing career: 2022–present

Career history
- 2013–2015: BK Saldus
- 2022–2023: BK Ventspils
- 2023–2024: BK Ogre
- 2024–2025: CS Rapid București
- 2025–present: Veertien Mie

Matīss Kulačkovskis (born October 1, 1997) is a Latvian professional basketball player. He is currently playing for Veertien Mie at power forward position.

== Early life and education ==
Kulackovskis was born 1 October 1997 in Saldus, Latvia to Viktors Kulackovskis and Gita Kulackovska. He has one younger sister. Though he grew up in Latvia, he spent the last two years of high school in United States. As a senior for the Archbishop Ryan High School team in Philadelphia, he averaged 17.2 points, 9.0 rebounds, and 3.1 assists. After graduating from high school in 2017, he attended Bowling Green State University, averaging 6.8 points and 2.9 rebounds per game in his senior year.

== Professional career ==
Kulackovskis debuted at professional level when he was still under-aged, playing for his hometown team BK Saldus in Latvian League. After graduating college, he came back to Latvia and signed with BK Ventspils. In summer of 2023, he signed for BK Ogre.
