= Artūrs Brūniņš =

Latvian basketball player (born 1982)

BK Jekābpils
- Title: Head coach
- League: LBL2

Personal information
- Born: July 13, 1982 (age 44) Gulbene, Latvian SSR, USSR
- Listed height: 2.00 m (6 ft 7 in)
- Listed weight: 96 kg (212 lb)

Career information
- Playing career: 1997–2013
- Position: Small forward
- Number: 13
- Coaching career: 2013–present

Career history

Playing
- 1997–2004: ASK/Buki
- 2004–2008: Barons LMT
- 2008–2009: ASK/Buki
- 2009–2010: Barons LMT
- 2010: Zemgale
- 2010–2012: Neptūnas
- 2012–2013: Barons LMT

Coaching
- 2013–2021: BK Gulbenes Buki
- 2021–present: BK Jēkabpils

Artūrs Brūniņš (born July 13, 1982) is a Latvian professional basketball player. He plays primarily at the small forward position, but he can also play power forward if needed.
