= Torraye Braggs =

American basketball player (born 1976)

Personal information
- Born: May 15, 1976 (age 50) Fresno, California, U.S.
- Listed height: 6 ft 8 in (2.03 m)
- Listed weight: 253 lb (115 kg)

Career information
- High school: Edison (Fresno, California)
- College: San Jose CC (1994–1996); Xavier (1996–1998)
- NBA draft: 1998: 2nd round, 57th overall pick
- Drafted by: Utah Jazz
- Playing career: 1998–2012
- Position: Power forward / center
- Number: 32, 21

Career history
- 1998: Alerta Cantabria
- 1998–1999: Gran Canaria
- 1999: Gaiteros del Zulia
- 1999–2000: Rockford Lightning
- 2000: Manresa
- 2000: Gaiteros del Zulia
- 2000–2001: Indiana Legends
- 2001–2002: Aris Thessaloniki
- 2002: Toros de Aragua
- 2002: Cangrejeros de Santurce
- 2002: Coca-Cola Tigers
- 2002: PAOK Thessaloniki
- 2003: Hapoel Jerusalem
- 2003: Gallitos de Isabela
- 2003: Maratonistas de Coamo
- 2003: Houston Rockets
- 2003–2004: Yakima Sun Kings
- 2004: Washington Wizards
- 2004: Sioux Falls Skyforce
- 2004: Barangay Ginebra Kings
- 2004–2005: Spartak Saint Petersburg
- 2005: Houston Rockets
- 2005: Mobis
- 2005–2006: Tulsa 66ers
- 2006: Spartak Primorye
- 2006: Qingdao Eagles
- 2006–2007: Hapoel Ramat Gan
- 2007: ASK Rīga
- 2008: Pioneros de Quintana
- 2008: Petrochimi Bandar Imam
- 2008: Orthodox
- 2008–2009: Pioneros de Quintana
- 2009: Guaros de Lara
- 2009–2010: Malvín
- 2010: Guaros de Lara
- 2010: Mets de Guaynabo
- 2011: Argentino de Junín
- 2011: Gimnasia Comodoro
- 2011: Guaros de Lara
- 2011: Sameji
- 2011: Titanes del Distrito Nacional
- 2011: Guruyú Waston
- 2012: Gaiteros del Zulia
- 2012: Caribbean Heat

Career highlights
- Greek League All-Star (2002); Latvian League champion (2007); Venezuelan League MVP (2009); PBA champion (2004); 2× CBA All-Star (2000, 2004)
- Stats at NBA.com
- Stats at Basketball Reference

Torraye L. Braggs (born May 15, 1976) is an American professional basketball player. During his pro club career, Braggs played in the NBA, and also in seventeen other countries' national domestic leagues, including: Spain, Venezuela, Greece, Puerto Rico, the Philippines, Israel, Russia, South Korea, China, Latvia, Mexico, Jordan, Iran, Uruguay, Argentina, the Dominican Republic, and Colombia.

== High school career ==
Braggs, who was born in Fresno, California, attended Edison High School, in Fresno, where he also played high school basketball.

== College career ==
After high school, Braggs played college basketball at San Jose City College, from 1994 to 1996. He then played NCAA Division I college basketball at Xavier University, with the Xavier Musketeers, from 1996 to 1998.

== Professional career ==
After college, Braggs was drafted by the Utah Jazz, in the second round of the 1998 NBA draft, with the 57th overall draft pick. After being drafted, Braggs began his professional career with the Spanish ACB League club Alerta Cantabria. After spending several years playing basketball in Europe, Braggs spent time with two teams in the NBA. He played with the Houston Rockets, in November 2003 and March 2005. He also played with the Washington Wizards, from January to February 2004. He averaged 2.1 points per game during his NBA career. In the United States, he also played in the Continental Basketball Association (CBA), the American Basketball Association (ABA), and the NBA Developmental League (NBDL).

In the 2006–07 season, Braggs played with the Latvian Basketball League club ASK Rīga. With ASK Rīga, he won the Latvian League's championship that season. During that same season, Braggs averaged 13.0 points per game in the Latvian national domestic league (LBL), 14.4 points per game in the regional Baltic Basketball League (BBL), and 13.4 points per game overall, in the two competitions combined. In the 2008–09 season, Braggs played for the Uruguayan Basketball League (LUB) club Malvín.
