= Sportino Inowrocław =

Polish basketball team founded in 1994

Sportino Inowrocław was a Polish basketball team, based in Inowrocław. Founded in 1994, they were disbanded in 2012.

== Notable players ==
- (Latvia) Ivars Timermanis
