= Justin Hurtt =

American basketball player (born 1988)

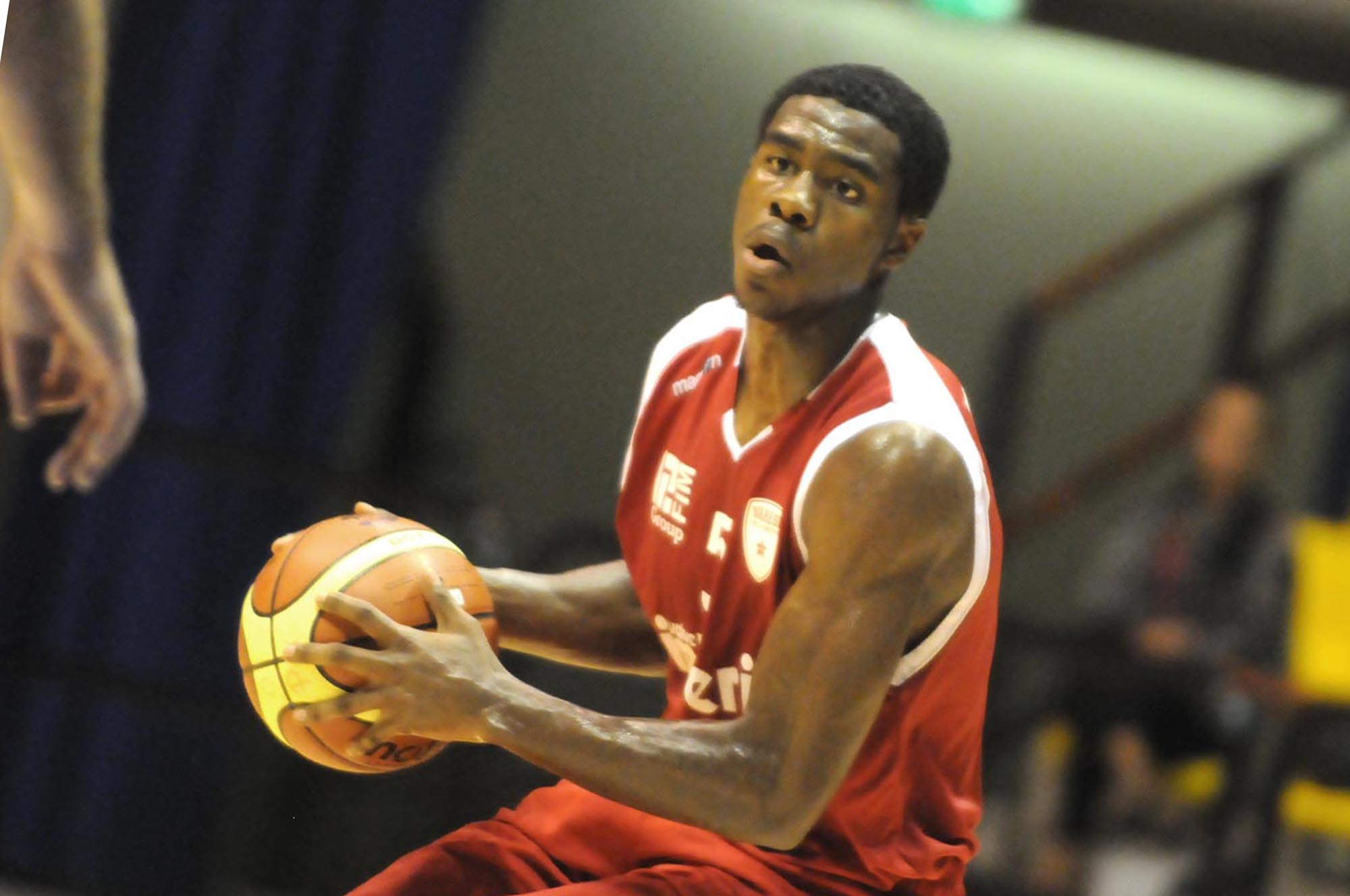
- Hurtt with Varese in 2011

Slávia Žilina
- Position: Shooting guard
- League: SBL

Personal information
- Born: 3 October 1988 (age 38) Kansas City, Missouri, U.S.
- Listed height: 1.96 m (6 ft 5 in)
- Listed weight: 93 kg (205 lb)

Career information
- High school: Archbishop O'Hara (Kansas City, Missouri)
- College: Tulsa (2007–2011)
- NBA draft: 2011: undrafted
- Playing career: 2011–present

Career history
- 2011–2012: Pallacanestro Varese
- 2012: Belfius Mons-Hainaut
- 2012–2013: Iowa Energy
- 2013–2014: Rethymno Cretan Kings
- 2014–2015: Valmiera
- 2015–2016: Pallacanestro Mantovana
- 2016: Universo Treviso
- 2018: KW Titans
- 2018–2019: Deportivo Hispano Americano
- 2019: Hapoel Haifa
- 2020–present: Slávia Žilina

Justin Edward Hurtt (born 3 October 1988) is an American professional basketball player for Slávia Žilina of the Slovak Basketball League (SBL). He played college basketball for the University of Tulsa before playing professionally in Italy, Belgium, the NBA G League, Greece, Latvia, Israel, Canada and Argentina.

== College career ==
Hurtt had shoulder surgery midway through his freshman year at Tulsa. As a junior at Tulsa, Hurtt averaged 14.5 points and 3.4 rebounds per game. He recorded his first career double-double, scoring 25 points and pulling down 10 rebounds in the opening round of the NIT. Early in his senior season, Hurtt had a six-game streak of scoring 20 points or more, the first time a Tulsa player did so in 23 years. As a senior, Hurtt was named to the First Team All-Conference USA. He averaged 20 points and 3.8 rebounds per game.

== Professional career ==
In August 2011, Hurtt signed his first professional contract with Pallacanestro Varese of the Italian Serie A. He was averaging 7.3 points per game in Serie A after 17 games before being released. In February 2012, Hurtt signed with Belfius Mons-Hainaut of the Belgian league.

Hurtt has played professionally in Latvia, Greece, and the NBA G-League. He competed in the Italian second division, Serie A2, for Pallacanestro Mantovana in 2015–16 and averaged 14 points and 3.6 rebounds per game in 28 games. In January 2018, Hurtt signed with the KW Titans of the National Basketball League of Canada (NBL). In 20 games, he averaged 19.2 points, 4.7 rebounds and 2.8 assists per game for the Titans.

On August 2, 2019, Hurtt signed with Hapoel Haifa of the Israeli National League for the 2019–20 season. On November 8, 2019, he parted ways with Haifa after appearing in two games.

On March 1, 2020, he has signed with Slávia Žilina of the Slovak Basketball League (SBL).
