= BK Jēkabpils =

Latvian basketball club

Jēkabpils
- Nickname: "Lynxes"
- Leagues: Latvijas Basketbola līga
- Founded: 2012, 2024
- Dissolved: 2022
- History: BK Jēkabpils (2012–2022); Jēkabpils BA (2024–present)
- Arena: Jēkabpils Sporta nams
- Capacity: 600
- Location: Jēkabpils, Latvia
- Team colors: Gold, black, and white
- President: Mārtiņš Mālnieks
- Head coach: Renārs Magone
- Website: bkjekabpils.lv
Home	Away	Third

BK Jēkabpils are a professional basketball club based in Jēkabpils, Latvia. Founded in 2012 as BK Jēkabpils, the team currently plays in the Latvijas Basketbola līga (LBL) and the Baltic Basketball League, and has been playing in the highest division since its foundation. The club's home arena is the Jēkabpils Sporta nams. Due to financial struggles, the team folded in 2022. In 2024 a new team, Jēkabpils BA, was founded.

In their first season (2012–13) the club entered the Latvijas Basketbola līga (LBL) playoff quarterfinals, which they lost to Barons Kvartāls. Already in the following season the club had even more success with their coach Igors Miglinieks, managing to win bronze medals in the LBL. In their third season Jēkabpils outplayed Liepāja and repeated the bronze medal the second year in a row.

== Season by season ==
Season	League	Pos.	Baltic League
2012–13	LBL	5th	
2013–14	LBL	3rd	Round of 16
2014–15	LBL	3rd	Round of 16
2015–16	LBL	7th	Quarterfinalist
2016–17	LBL	5th	Round of 16
2017–18	LBL	7th	
Season	League	Pos.	LEBL
2018–19	LBL	8th	15th

== Coaches ==
- (Latvia) Edgars Teteris (2012–2014)
- (Latvia) Igors Miglinieks (2014)
- (Latvia) Edmunds Valeiko (2014–2015)
- (Latvia) Igors Miglinieks (2015–2016)
- (Latvia) Rūdolfs Rozītis (2016–2017)
- (Latvia) Sandis Buškevics (2017–2018)
- (Serbia) Marko Zarkovič (2018–2019)
- (Latvia) Agris Galvanovskis (2019–2021)
- (Latvia) Artūrs Brūniņš (2021–2022)

== Notable players ==
- (Latvia) Aigars Vītols
- (Poland) Michal Hlebowicki
- (Latvia) Rinalds Sirsniņš
- (Latvia) Mārtiņš Kravčenko
- (Latvia) Pāvels Veselovs
- (Latvia) Andrejs Šeļakovs
- (Lithuania) Povilas Čukinas
- (Latvia) Rihards Kuksiks
- (Lithuania) Dovydas Redikas
- (Latvia) Jurijs Aleksejevs
