= Pāvels Veselovs =

Latvian basketball player

Free Agent
- Position: Power forward / center

Personal information
- Born: 15 July 1983 (age 43) Rīga, Latvia
- Listed height: 2.07 m (6 ft 9 in)
- Listed weight: 107 kg (236 lb)

Career information
- Playing career: 2000–present

Career history
- 2000—2004: Gulbenes Buki
- 2004—2006: BK Ventspils
- 2006: Gulbenes Buki
- 2006—2009: BK Ventspils
- 2009: Cherno More Port Varna
- 2009—2010: BK Prostějov
- 2010—2011: BK Valmiera
- 2011—2012: Keravnos Strovolou
- 2012—2013: BK Valmiera
- 2013—2017: BK Jēkabpils
- 2017—2018: Gulbenes Buki

Pāvels Veselovs (born 15 July 1983 in Rīga, Latvia) is a Latvian professional basketball player who plays the power forward position.

== Pro career ==
He started his professional basketball career in 2000 with BK Gulbenes Buki. In the team he spent four seasons, the last of them already becoming a team leader. In the summer of 2004, he joined the Latvian champion BK Ventspils, representing it till 2009. In February 2006 he was rented by Gulbenes team, but after the season returned to BK Ventspils. Together with BK Ventspils Veselovs twice has become a champion of Latvia.

In July 2011 he signed a contract with Cyprus League club Keravnos Strovolou. However, in the summer of 2012 he moved to Latvian League club BK Valmiera. After the season in Valmiera he joined another Latvian highest division club BK Jēkabpils.

== Latvian national team ==
He has represented Latvia national team in EuroBasket 2007. Veselovs also has played for Latvia U-20 national team.

== Pro clubs ==
- 2000—2004: BK Gulbenes Buki
- 2004—2006: BK Ventspils
- 2006: BK Gulbenes Buki
- 2006—2009: BK Ventspils
- 2009: BC Cherno More Port Varna
- 2009—2010: BK Prostejov
- 2010—2011: BK Valmiera
- 2011—2012: Keravnos Strovolou
- 2012—2013: BK Valmiera
- 2013—present: BK Jēkabpils
