= BK Saldus =

Latvian basketbal club

- Leagues: LBL
- Founded: 2005
- Arena: Saldus Sporta nams
- Location: Saldus, Latvia
- Team colors: Yellow and Blue
- Head coach: (Latvia) Guntis Endzels
- Website: bksaldus.lv
Home	Away

BK Saldus is a professional basketball club based in Saldus, Latvia playing in the Latvian Basketball League.

Since 2007 the club played in Latvian Basketball League second division, but in 2013 the club became the second division champions and received an invitation to participate in first division.

== Roster ==
As of January 12, 2015

#		Player	Pos.	Height	Weight
1	(Latvia)	Mareks Buludris	G	191 cm	71 kg
5	(Latvia)	Elvis Endzels	G	188 cm	80 kg
5	(Latvia)	Edijs Frīdmanis	C	202 cm	80 kg
6	(Latvia)	Roberts Freimanis	F	201 cm	96 kg
7	(Latvia)	Mārtiņš Rugājs	F	194 cm	89 kg
8	(Latvia)	Mārtiņš Šteinbergs	G	191 cm	86 kg
10	(Latvia)	Krists Pīternieks	F	202 cm	87 kg
12	(Latvia)	Dāvis Gūtmanis	F	192 cm	79 kg
13	(Latvia)	Edgars Buiķis	G	180 cm	72 kg
13	(Latvia)	Kārlis Žunda	G	192 cm	75 kg
21	(Latvia)	Miks Ķenavs	F	184 cm	84 kg
23	(United States)	James Brandon Hassell	C	209 cm	108 kg
24	(Latvia)	Roberts Šmīdriņš	F	190 cm	80 kg
25	(Latvia)	Jānis Līcītis	C	200 cm	120 kg
45	(Latvia)	Matīss Kulačkovskis	F	190 cm	76 kg

== Season by season ==
Season	League	Pos.	Significant Events	Baltic League
2013–14	LBL	10	–	–
2014–15	LBL	9	–	–
