= Corey Brewer (basketball, born 1975) =

American basketball player (born 1975)

Personal information
- Born: January 2, 1975 (age 51) West Memphis, Arkansas, U.S.
- Listed height: 6 ft 2 in (1.88 m)
- Listed weight: 190 lb (86 kg)

Career information
- High school: West Memphis (West Memphis, Arkansas)
- College: Navarro (1994–1995); Carl Albert State (1995–1996); Oklahoma (1996–1998)
- NBA draft: 1998: 2nd round, 51st overall pick
- Drafted by: Miami Heat
- Playing career: 1998–2011
- Position: Point guard
- Number: 5, 31, 33

Career history
- 1998–1999: Grand Rapids Hoops
- 1999: New Jersey Shorecats
- 1999–2000: New Mexico Slam
- 2000–2001: Fila Biella
- 2001–2002: Caja San Fernando
- 2002: Oklahoma Storm
- 2002–2004: Estudiantes
- 2004–2005: Virtus Bologna
- 2005–2006: Aris Thessaloniki
- 2006–2007: Spirou Charleroi
- 2007–2008: Zadar
- 2008: ASK Riga
- 2008–2009: Estudiantes
- 2010: Pınar Karşıyaka
- 2010–2011: Lleida Bàsquet
- Stats at Basketball Reference
Medals
Men's basketball
Representing United States
Summer Universiade
Gold medal – first place	1997 Trapani	Team competition

Corey Lavelle Brewer (born January 2, 1975) is an American former professional basketball player.

After graduating from West Memphis High School, Brewer attended and played basketball at Navarro Junior College (1994–1995) and Carl Albert State College (1995–1996) before transferring to the University of Oklahoma, where he played two seasons for coach Kelvin Sampson. The 6 ft 2 in (1.88 m), 190 lb (86 kg) point guard was named to the Under-22 USA Basketball Team in July 1997.

Brewer was selected by the Miami Heat with the 51st overall pick in the 1998 NBA draft, but spent the 1998–1999 season in the Continental Basketball Association, playing for the Grand Rapids Hoops. He was signed by the Heat on September 29, 1999, but was waived a month later without playing in any NBA games.

The 1999–2000 season found Brewer in the IBL's New Mexico Slam, after which he began playing for European teams such as Italian second division (Serie A2) teams Fila Biella (2000–2001), before moving to Spain's ACB, where he played for CB Sevilla (2001–2002) and CB Estudiantes (2002–2004). He then returned to Italy, playing for Caffè Maxim Bologna (2004–2005), moving on to Greece's Aris BC (2005–2006) and Belgium's Spirou Charleroi. He spent the 2007–2008 season playing for KK Zadar in Croatia. During 2008–2009, Brewer played for ASK Riga and prior to the 2010–11 season, he signed with Lleida of the LEB Oro League.

== Personal life ==
At age fifteen, Brewer survived a shotgun wound after reportedly trying to mediate a street altercation.
