= Aerick Sanders =

American basketball player and coach

Green Bay Phoenix
- Title: Assistant coach
- League: Horizon League

Personal information
- Born: June 1, 1982 (age 44) Los Angeles, California
- Listed height: 6 ft 8 in (2.03 m)
- Listed weight: 220 lb (100 kg)

Career information
- High school: Junipero Serra (Gardena, California)
- College: San Diego State (2000–2004)
- NBA draft: 2004: undrafted
- Playing career: 2004–2011
- Position: Power forward
- Number: 8, 34
- Coaching career: 2012–present

Career history

Playing
- 2004–2005: Tuborg Pilsener
- 2005: Hapoel Tel Aviv B.C.
- 2005–2006: CB Ciudad de Huelva
- 2006–2007: Strasbourg IG
- 2007–2008: ASK Riga
- 2008: Aliağa Petkim
- 2008–2009: JDA Dijon Basket
- 2009–2010: SPO Rouen Basket
- 2011: Académica Coimbra

Coaching
- 2012–2013: Montana State (assistant)
- 2013–2021: New Mexico State (assistant)
- 2021–2022: Southern Utah (assistant)
- 2022–2024: Kansas City (assistant)
- 2024–present: Green Bay (assistant)

Aerick Rashal Sanders (born June 1, 1982) is a retired American professional basketball player and current assistant coach for the University of Wisconsin–Green Bay of the Horizon League. Previously he was the former Director of Player Personnel at the University of Nevada, Las Vegas from 2017 to 2019. He was the former assistant coach of the New Mexico State men's basketball team during the 2013–2017 seasons. During his professional career as a player, he played at the power forward position internationally, including as a member of the Strasbourg IG, Aliaga Petkim and Academia Coimbre basketball clubs respectively.

== College career ==
Sanders was a standout basketball player at San Diego State. He was an All-Mountain West selection and team captain as a senior for the Aztecs. He averaged 16.1 points and 9.8 rebounds in his final season. Additionally, Sanders led Aztecs to the NCAA Tournament following a Mountain West Tournament Championship in 2002.

== Professional career ==
After Sanders completed his career at San Diego State Aztecs men's basketball in 2004, he went on to play professionally overseas. Aerick played for six seasons with clubs such as Tuborg (Turkey), Ciudad de Huelva (Spain), Strasbourg (France), ASK Riga (Latvia), Aliaga (Turkey), Dijon (France), SPO Rouen (France) and Academica (Portugal) before a devastating knee injury ended his playing career.

== Coaching career ==
Shortly after his professional career came to an end, Sanders began his own sports academy focused on helping players develop their skills on the court. The Sanders Sports Academy provided training for players at the professional level and aspiring basketball players at the grade school level.

Sanders spent the 2012–13 season as an assistant coach at Montana State. Aerick Sanders joined the New Mexico State Aggies men's basketball team as an assistant coach in June 2013.
