= 2013–14 Latvian Basketball League =

Latvian basketball league season for the highest division

- League: Latvian Basketball League
- Sport: Basketball
- Duration: October 1, 2013 – May 19, 2014

Regular season
- Top seed: BK Ventspils

Finals
- Champions: BK Ventspils
- Runners-up: VEF Rīga
- Finals MVP: (Latvia) Jānis Timma

LBL seasons
- ← 2012–13 2014–15 →

The 2013–14 Latvian Basketball League is the 23rd season. It was sponsored by Aldaris and thus officially known as the Aldaris Latvijas Basketbola līga. The season began on 1 October 2013 and ended on 19 May 2014.

== Participants ==
Location of clubs in the 2013-14 Latvian Basketball League
- VEF Rīga
- BK Ventspils
- Liepāja/Triobet
- BK Valmiera
- BK Jelgava
- Jūrmala/Fēnikss
- BK Jēkabpils
- Latvijas Universitāte
- BA Turība
- Barons kvartāls
- BK Saldus
- LMT BA

== Regular season ==
	Team	Pld	W	L	%	PF	PA	Qualification
1	BK Ventspils	22	20	2	90.9	1939	1398	Qualified for the semifinals
2	VEF Rīga	12	10	2	83.3	1042	847	Qualified for the semifinals
3	BK Valmiera	37	26	11	70.3	2880	2656	Qualified for the quarterfinals
4	BK Jēkabpils	37	25	12	67.6	3054	2678	Qualified for the quarterfinals
5	Liepāja/Triobet	37	25	12	67.6	2994	2676	Qualified for the quarterfinals
6	Jūrmala/Fēnikss	37	21	16	56.8	2835	2744	Qualified for the quarterfinals
7	Barons kvartāls	37	18	19	48.6	2813	2824	
8	Latvijas Universitāte	37	15	22	40.5	2794	2919	
9	BK Jelgava	37	12	25	32.4	2861	3070	
10	BK Saldus	37	12	25	32.4	2569	2904	
11	BA Turība	37	10	27	27.0	2593	2888	
12	LMT BA	21	0	21	0.0	1161	1931	

== Playoffs ==
Quarterfinals
4	BK Jēkabpils	3
5	Liepāja/Triobet	1
3	BK Valmiera	1
6	Jūrmala/Fēnikss	3

Semifinals
1	BK Ventspils	3
4	BK Jēkabpils	2
2	VEF Rīga	3
6	Jūrmala/Fēnikss	0

Finals
1	BK Ventspils	4
2	VEF Rīga	1
Third place
4	BK Jēkabpils	3
6	Jūrmala/Fēnikss	1

== Awards ==
Month	Player of the Month	
Month	Player	Team
October	(Poland) Michal Hlebowicki	BK Jēkabpils
November	(Latvia) Raimonds Gabrāns	BK Valmiera
December	(Latvia) Jānis Antrops	BA Turība
January	(Latvia) Aigars Šķēle	Jūrmala/Fēnikss
February	(Latvia) Ronalds Zaķis	BK Ventspils
March	(Latvia) Artis Ate	Liepāja/Triobet

== See also ==
- 2013–14 VTB United League
- 2013–14 Baltic Basketball League
