= Ivars Timermanis =

Latvian basketball player (born 1982)

Personal information
- Born: February 4, 1982 (age 44) Bauska, Latvia
- Listed height: 6 ft 8 in (2.03 m)
- Listed weight: 210 lb (95 kg)

Career information
- Playing career: 1999–2014
- Position: Small forward

Career history
- 1999–2002: Gulbenes Buki
- 2002–2003: Barons LMT
- 2003–2007: BK Ventspils
- 2007–2008: Eisbären Bremerhaven
- 2008: Sportino Inowrocław
- 2009–2011: Barons LMT
- 2011: BC Rakvere Tarvas
- 2011–2012: BC Cherkasy
- 2012: BK Liepājas Lauvas
- 2012–2013: CSU Asesoft Ploiesti
- 2013–2014: BC Cherkasy
- 2014: BK Liepājas Lauvas

Ivars Timermanis (born February 4, 1982) is a retired Latvian professional basketball player who played the Small forward position.

== Pro career ==
He was a member of the Latvian national basketball team. He has played in various teams in Latvia and Germany, such as BK Ventspils, Barons LMT and Eisbären Bremerhaven in German Basketball Bundesliga. After playing half of the 2010–11 season with BC Rakvere Tarvas, he joined Ukrainian club BC Cherkasy the next season. In the 2012–13 season he joined CSU Asesoft where he won the Romanian championship.

In September 2014, Timermanis announced his retirement.

== Honours ==
- 2003–04 Latvian League (BK Ventspils)
- 2004–05 Latvian League (BK Ventspils)
- 2005–06 Latvian League (BK Ventspils)
- 2009–10 Latvian League (Barons LMT)
- 2012–13 Romanian League (CSU Asesoft Ploiesti)
