= BK Gulbenes Buki =

Latvian basketball club

Gulbenes Buki
- Leagues: LBL2
- Founded: 1997
- Arena: Gulbenes Sporta centrs
- Location: Gulbene, Latvia
- President: Gatis Rikveilis
- Head coach: Raimonds Gabrāns
- Website: https://www.gulbenesbuki.com/

BK Gulbenes Buki, formerly known as ASK/Buki, is a Latvian basketball team participating in the Latvian Basketball League second division.

== Achievements ==
Best achievements in the domestic league:

- 3rd place in 1998–99 season
- 3rd place in 2000–01 season
- 3rd place in 2001–02 season
- 3rd place in 2002–03 season
- 2nd place in 2005–06 season

== Notable former players ==
- Agris Galvanovskis
- Mārtiņš Skirmants
- Ivars Timermanis
- Kaspars Cipruss
- Kristaps Purnis
- Pāvels Veselovs
- Raimonds Gabrāns
- Ingus Bankevics
