= Akin Akingbala =

Nigerian professional basketball player

Personal information
- Born: 25 March 1983 (age 43) Lagos, Nigeria
- Listed height: 6 ft 10 in (2.08 m)
- Listed weight: 265 lb (120 kg)

Career information
- High school: Brunswick School (Greenwich, Connecticut)
- College: Clemson (2002–2006)
- NBA draft: 2006: undrafted
- Playing career: 2006–2017
- Position: Power forward / center

Career history
- 2006: Los Angeles D-Fenders
- 2006–2007: Lleida
- 2007–2008: Ventspils
- 2008: Universitet Yugra Surgut
- 2008–2012: SLUC Nancy
- 2012–2013: Azovmash
- 2013–2014: Wolves Verviers-Pepinster
- 2014–2015: Rouen
- 2015–2016: Shahrdari Tabriz
- 2017: Sáenz Horeca Araberri

Career highlights
- LNB Pro A champion (2011); Latvian All-Star Game MVP (2008)
Medals
Men's basketball
Representing Nigeria
AfroBasket
Silver medal – second place	2017 Tunisia/Senegal

Akinlolu Akinayi Akingbala (born 25 March 1983) is a Nigerian former professional basketball player who last played for Sáenz Horeca Araberri of the LEB Oro. He played college basketball for Clemson University. He is 2.09m (6 ft 10) tall and he can play both power forward and center positions.

== College career ==
After playing high school basketball at Brunswick School in Greenwich, Connecticut, Akingbala played college basketball at Clemson University, with the Clemson Tigers. A highlight of his college career was a 21-point, 16-rebound performance, in an 86–81 win over Virginia Tech, on 1 March 2006.

== Professional career ==
Akingbala went undrafted in the 2006 NBA draft. In July 2006, he joined the Boston Celtics for the 2006 NBA Summer League. He later signed with the Celtics, but they waived him in October 2006. He then joined the Los Angeles D-Fenders of the NBA D-League.

In December 2006, he moved to Spain and signed with Plus Pujol Lleida of the LEB Gold for the rest of the season. In October 2007, he signed a one-year deal with Ventspils of Latvia.

In September 2008, he signed with Universitet Yugra Surgut of Russia. He left them on 10 December 2008. On 15 December 2008, he moved to France and signed with SLUC Nancy Basket for the remainder of the season. In June 2009, he extend his contract with two more years. In July 2011, he extended his contract for one more year.

In August 2012, he signed a one-year deal with BC Azovmash of Ukraine. In July 2013, he signed with Enel Brindisi of Italy. He left them before the start of the season. In December 2013, he signed a one-year deal with VOO Wolves Verviers-Pepinster of Belgium.

In July 2014, he signed a one-year deal with SPO Rouen Basket of the French LNB Pro A. In February 2015, Rouen released him.

On 6 January 2017, Akingbala signed with Spanish club Sáenz Horeca Araberri for the rest of the 2016–17 LEB Oro season. One month later, he parted ways with Araberri.

== Nigerian national team ==
Akingbala has also been a member of the senior men's Nigerian national basketball team. He played at the 2009 FIBA African Championship.
