= ASK Riga =

Latvian basketball club

ASK Rīga
- Founded: 2004 (Note: The club was founded in 2004 as BK Rīga and re-founded in 2006 as ASK Rīga.)
- Dissolved: 2009
- History: BK Rīga (2004–2006); ASK Rīga (2006–2009)
- Arena: Arēna Rīga
- Capacity: 12,500
- Location: Riga, Latvia
- Team colors: White with Yellow-Gold stripes and Carolina Blue
- Championships: 1 Latvian Championships
- Website: askriga.lv
Home	Away

ASK Rīga is a former professional basketball club that was based in Riga, Latvia. "ASK" stood for "Armijas Sporta Klubs" (in English: Army Sports Club).

== History ==
BK Rīga was then founded in 2004 as an attempt to revive the defunct club Rīgas ASK which was founded in 1931 and considered the most successful Latvian club on international level. BK Riga got back the original name of ASK Rīga on March 23, 2006, which was supported by the Riga City Council, the National Latvian Army Forces, and some powerful sponsors, as well as the brand new Arēna Rīga, with room for 12,500 fans.

The team then made it to both the Baltic League and the FIBA EuroCup quarterfinals, but the best was yet to come. The arrival of Torraye Braggs happened to be the key piece in a roster already featuring Sandis Valters, Raitis Grafs, Curtis Millage, A.J. Bramlett, and Sandis Buškevics. ASK won the best-of-seven 2006–07 Latvian League finals 4–2, and started a new era for the club, breaking BK Ventspils's seven-year Latvian League dynasty. ASK hosted the EuroCup's 2007–08 opening game, but a plague of injuries did not allow the team to reach the competition's elimination rounds. In that season same 2007–08 season, ASK Rīga finished fourth in the Baltic League, and also finished in 3rd place in the Latvian League. The 2008–09 season was the last season of ASK Rīga to date.

== Arena ==
ASK Rīga played its home games at the 12,500 seat Arēna Rīga.

== Honours ==
=== Domestic competitions ===
- Latvian League

Winners (1): 2006–07

== Notable players ==
- Sandis Buškevics (28)
- Dairis Bertāns (45)
- Gatis Jahovičs (9)
- Kaspars Kambala (34)
- Roberts Štelmahers (7)
- Sandis Valters (10)
- Arnis Vecvagars (15)
- Uģis Viļums (7)
- Uvis Helmanis (4)
- Raitis Grafs (5)
- Ernests Kalve (11)
- Aigars Vītols (55)
- Darius Lukminas
- Martynas Andriukaitis (13)
- Steponas Babrauskas (11)
- Vytautas Danelius
- Marius Runkauskas (10)
- Andrius Mažutis (12)
- Milutin Aleksić (7)
- Bruno Šundov (14)
- Marko Antonijević
- Smiljan Pavič
- Rodney Billups (4)
- Torraye Braggs (32)
- A. J. Bramlett (42)
- Corey L. Brewer (31)
- Dwayne Broyles (8)
- Ricardo Marsh (21)
- Curtis Millage (14)
- Aerick Sanders (34)
- Sean Colson (8)
- List of ASK Rīga players

== Notable coaches ==
- Ramunas Butautas
- Donaldas Kairys
- Raimonds Miglinieks
