= Uģis Viļums =

Latvian basketball player

No. 5 – retired
- Position: Guard

Personal information
- Listed height: 1.91 m (6 ft 3 in)

Uģis Viļums (born 28 July 1979 in Saldus, Latvian SSR) is a former Latvian professional basketball guard, who played for Barons LMT. He was member of the Latvia men's national basketball team.
