= Andrius Mažutis =

Lithuanian basketball player (born 1981)

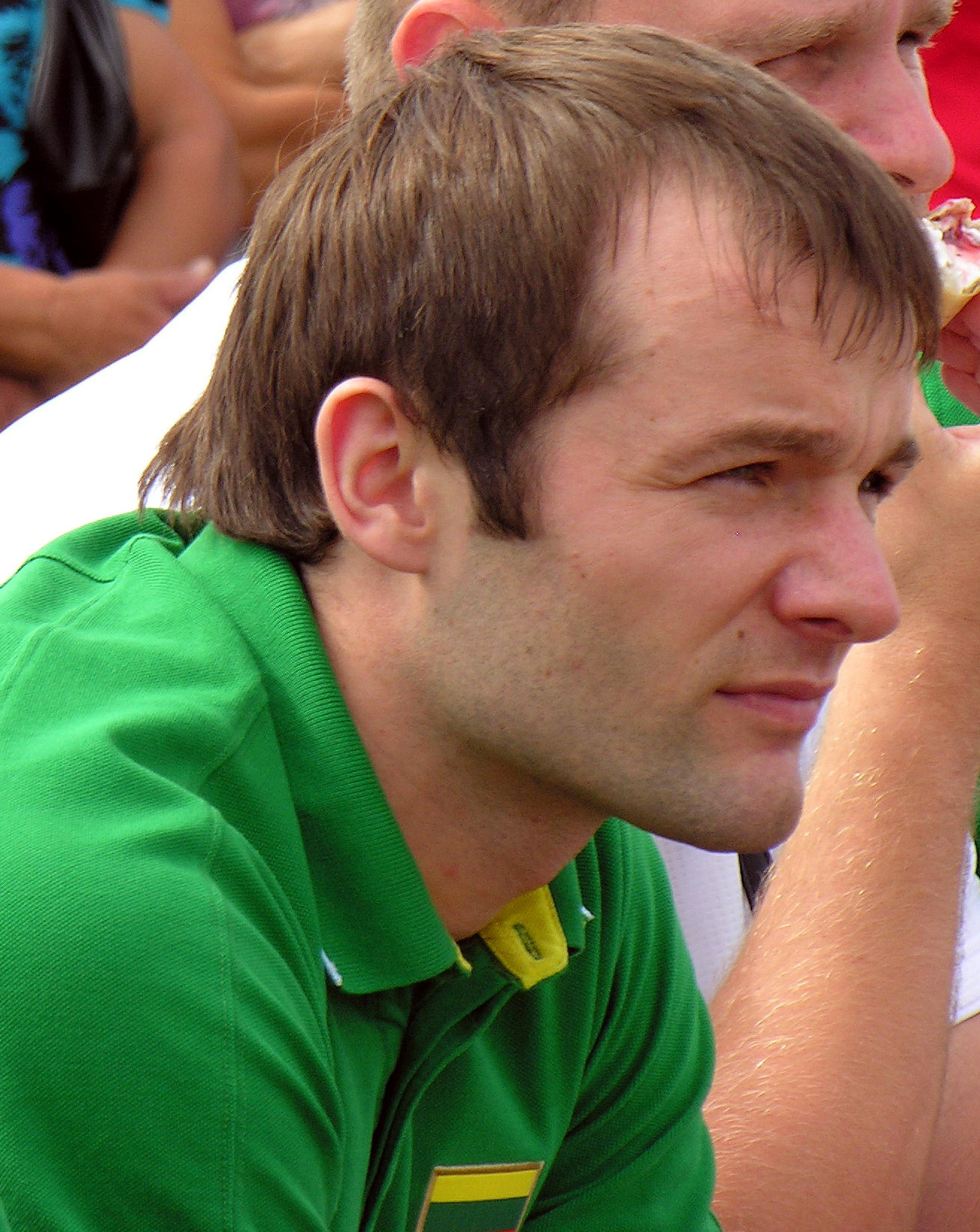
- Mažutis with Lithuania (2009)

Personal information
- Born: April 21, 1981 (age 45) Mažeikiai, Lithuanian SSR, Soviet Union
- Listed height: 179 cm (5 ft 10 in)
- Listed weight: 84 kg (185 lb)

Career information
- Playing career: 2000–2015
- Position: Point guard

Career history
- 2000–2004: Nafta Mažeikiai
- 2004–2005: Gala Baku
- 2005–2007: Šiauliai
- 2007–2008: Neptūnas
- 2008: ASK Rīga
- 2009: Donetsk
- 2010: Kepez Belediyesi
- 2010–2011: MBC Mykolaiv
- 2012: Prienai
- 2012: Nafta Mažeikiai
- 2013: Tsmoki-Minsk
- 2013–2015: Liepājas Lauvas

Career highlights
- Lithuanian Second Division champion (2001); Azerbaijani League champion (2005)

Andrius Mažutis (born April 21, 1981) is a retired Lithuanian professional basketball player. Standing at 1.80 m (5 ft 11 in), Mažutis used to play as point guard.
