= Jēkabpils district =

Former district of Latvia

Coordinates: 56°30′N 25°51′E

Jēkabpils
- District
- Coat of arms

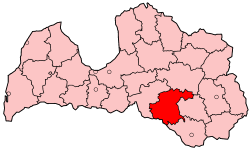
- Country: Latvia
- Established: 1949
- Dissolved: 2009

Area
  - Total: 2,998 km^{2} (1,158 sq mi)

Population
  - Total: 53,473
  - Density: 17.84/km^{2} (46.20/sq mi)

Jēkabpils district (Latvian: Jēkabpils rajons) was an administrative division of Latvia, located in the Latgale and Selonia historical regions. It was organized into three cities and twenty one parishes, each with a local government authority. The main city in the district was Jēkabpils.

Jēkabpils lies on both banks of the Daugava River. In the south the district bordered Lithuania and the length of the border was 44 km. It bordered the former districts of Madona to the north, Aizkraukle to the west, Preiļi and Daugavpils to the east.

The total area of the district was 2,998 km^{2}, the population was 53,473, making it the fifth largest region in Latvia based on area and population.

On 4 January 2000, the unemployment rate was 10.6% of the economically active population according to the State Employment Board data.

Jēkabpils was the eighth largest city in Latvia. There were two towns in the region—Viesīte with 2,230 inhabitants and Aknīste with 1,350 inhabitants. Urban population was 32,800 people, rural 25,000 living in 20 parishes and 2 towns.

Districts were eliminated during the administrative-territorial reform in 2009.

== Towns and parishes in Jēkabpils district ==
- Aknīste town
- Jēkabpils town
- Viesīte town
- Aknīste Parish
- Asare Parish
- Atašiene Parish
- Ābeļi Parish
- Dignāja Parish
- Dunava Parish
- Elkšņi Parish
- Gārsene Parish
- Kalna Parish
- Krustpils Parish
- Kūkas Parish
- Leimaņi Parish
- Mežāre Parish
- Rite Parish
- Rubene Parish
- Sala Parish
- Sauka Parish
- Sēlpils Parish
- Varieši Parish
- Viesīte Parish
- Vīpe Parish
- Zasa Parish
