= Viesīte Municipality =

Municipality of Latvia

Coordinates: 56°21′N 25°33′E

Viesīte Municipality Viesītes novads
- Municipality
- Coat of arms

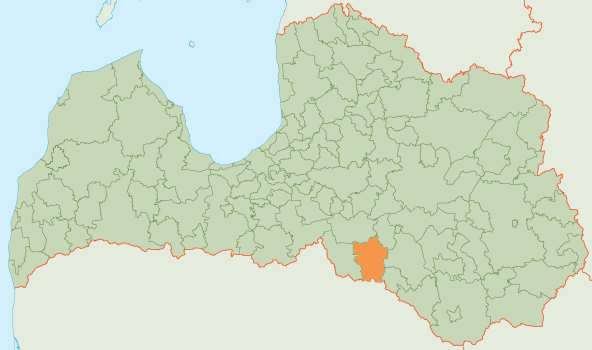
- Country: Latvia
- Formed: 2009
- Centre: Viesīte

Government
  - Council Chair: Alfons Žuks (V)

Area
  - Total: 651.15 km^{2} (251.41 sq mi)
  - Land: 626.62 km^{2} (241.94 sq mi)
  - Water: 24.53 km^{2} (9.47 sq mi)

Population (2021)
  - Total: 3,535
  - Density: 5.641/km^{2} (14.61/sq mi)
- Website: www.viesite.lv

Viesīte Municipality (Latvian: Viesītes novads) is a former municipality in Selonia, Latvia. The municipality was formed in 2009 by merging Elkšņi parish, Rite parish, Sauka parish and Viesīte town with its countryside territory, the administrative centre being Viesīte. In 2010 Viesīte parish was created from the countryside territory of Viesīte town. The population in 2020 was 3,500.

On 1 July 2021, Viesīte Municipality ceased to exist and its territory was merged into Jēkabpils Municipality.

== Twin towns — sister cities ==
Viesīte is twinned with:

- Czeladź, Poland
- Pastavy District, Belarus
- Rokiškis, Lithuania
- Zhydachiv, Ukraine

== See also ==
- Administrative divisions of Latvia
