= Aknīste Municipality =

Former municipality of Latvia

Coordinates: 56°09′38″N 25°47′53″E

Aknīste Municipality Aknīstes novads
- Former municipality
- Coat of arms

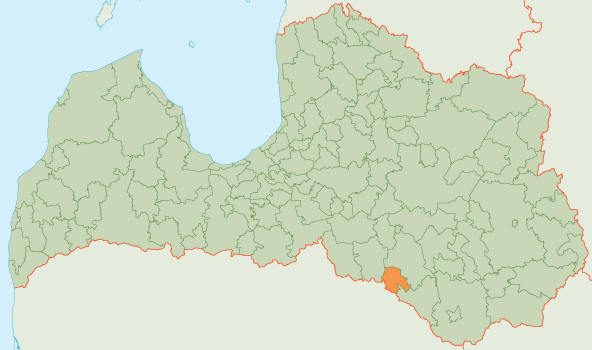
- Country: Latvia
- Formed: 2009
- Dissolved: 2021
- Centre: Aknīste

Government
  - Council Chair (last): Vija Dzene (For a United Municipality)

Area
  - Total: 284.72 km^{2} (109.93 sq mi)
  - Land: 280.63 km^{2} (108.35 sq mi)
  - Water: 4.09 km^{2} (1.58 sq mi)

Population (2021)
  - Total: 2,546
  - Density: 9.072/km^{2} (23.50/sq mi)
- Website: www.akniste.lv

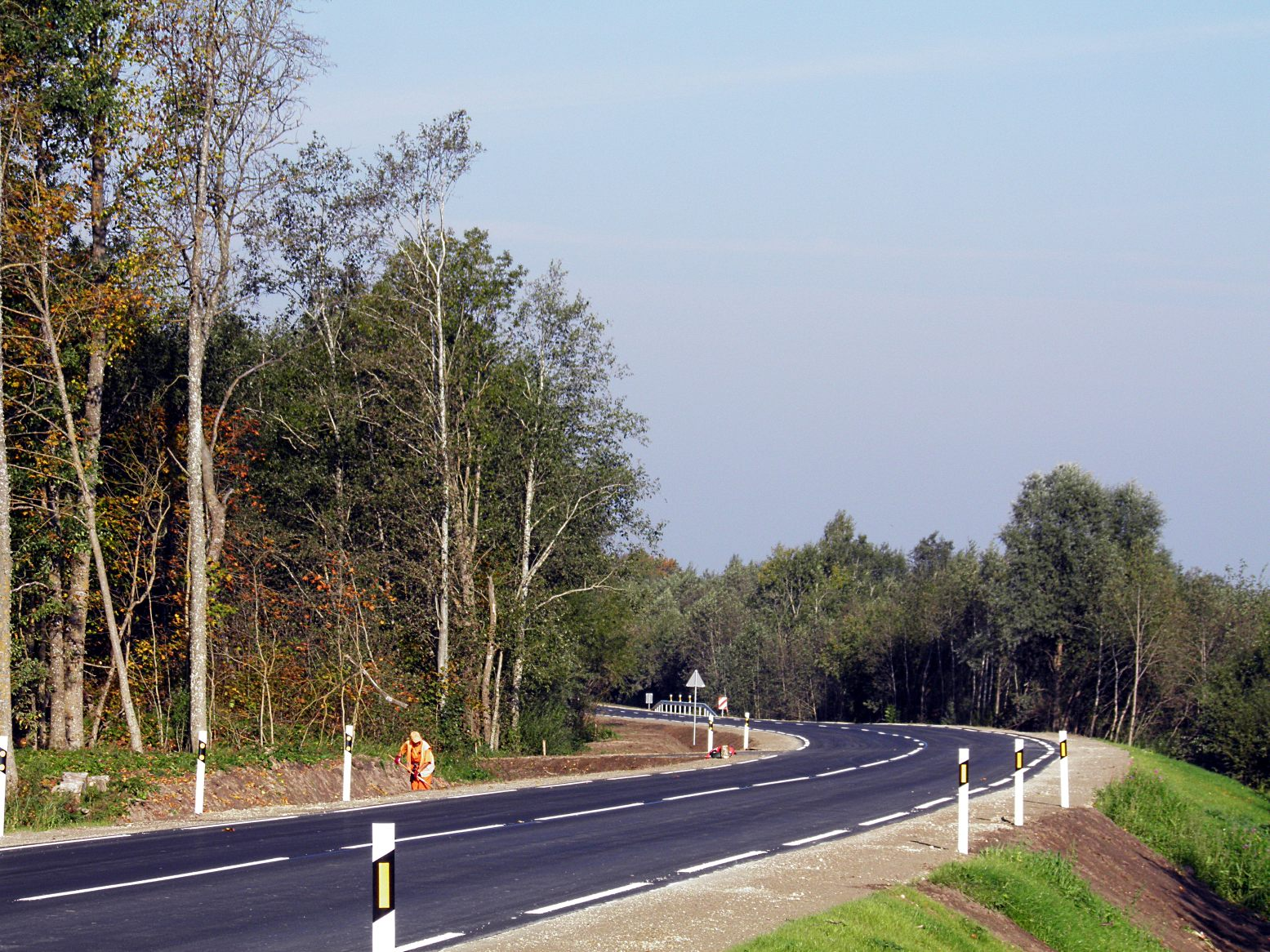
Road P73, NW of Aknīste

Aknīste Municipality (Latvian: Aknīstes novads) was a municipality in Selonia, Latvia. The municipality was formed in 2009 by merging Aknīste town with its countryside territory, Asare Parish and Gārsene Parish of the former Jēkabpils district. The administrative centre was Aknīste. In 2010 Aknīste Parish was created from the countryside territory of Aknīste town.

The population in 2020 was 2,520.

On 1 July 2021, Aknīste Municipality ceased to exist and its territory was merged into Jēkabpils Municipality.

== See also ==
- Administrative divisions of Latvia
