= Sauka Nature Park =

Nature park in Latvia

- IUCN category II (national park)
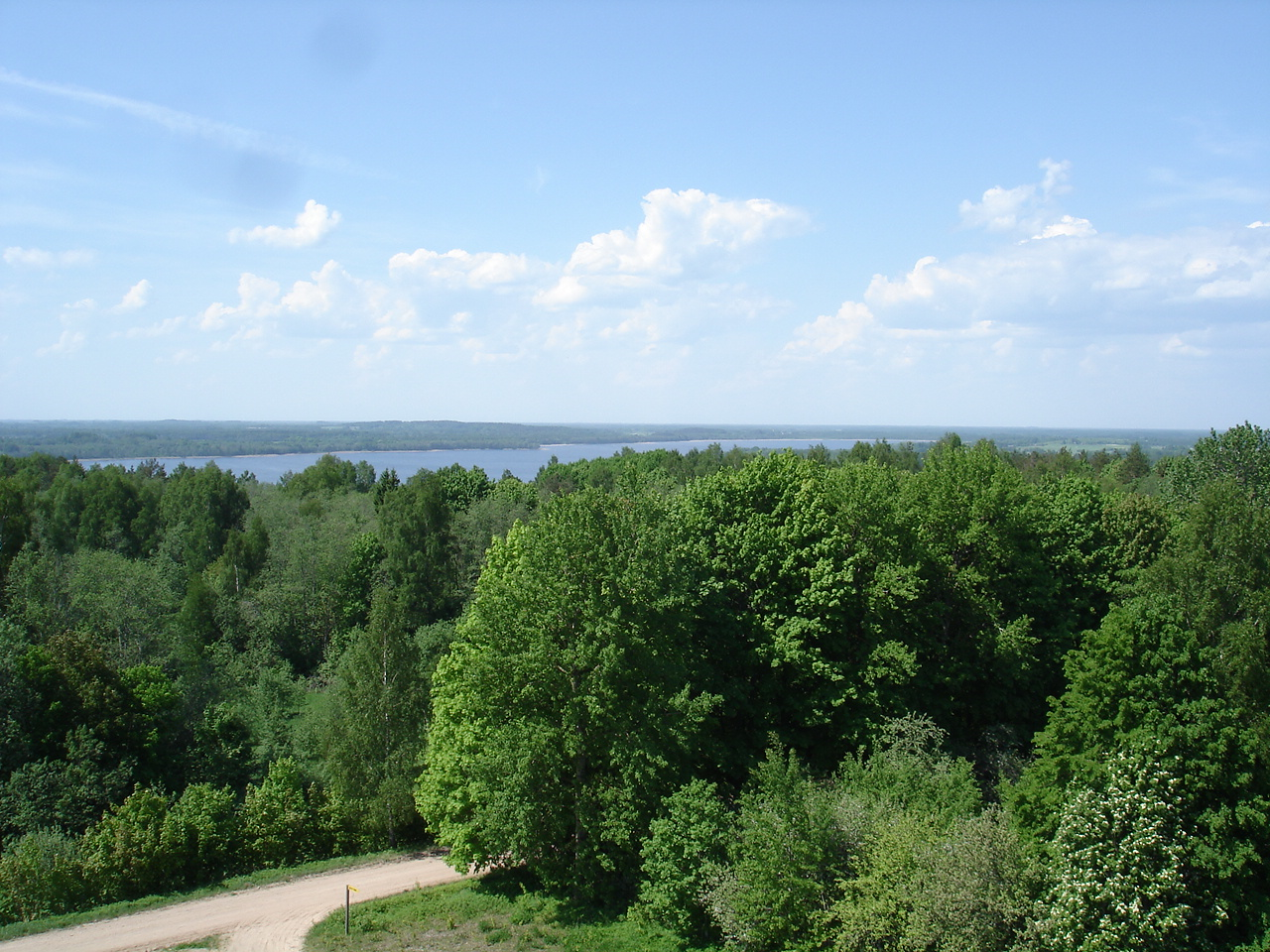
- View from Ormankalns Hill toward Lake Sauka

- Location within Latvia
- Location: Latvia, Selonia, Jēkabpils Municipality
- Nearest city: Lone (Latvia)
- Coordinates: 56°15′47″N 25°28′04″E
- Area: 56.03 km^{2} (21.63 sq mi)
- Established: 1987
- Website: www.saukasdabasparks.lv

Sauka Nature Park is located in Jēkabpils Municipality in Elkšņi, Sauka and Rite parishes in the Selonia region of Latvia. The nature park is located in the highest part, in its territory there are Saukas ezers, Big Lake Klauce, Bukūzis, Aklais Lake (Rite Parish), Klauce River and Dūņupe. To the east of Lake Sauka is Ormaņkalns Hill (165 m). The nature park acquired the status of national protection in 1987. Area of the territory 54 km^{2}.

The territory of Sauka Nature Park is divided by parishes as follows: Sauka Parish 23.2 km ^{2} (43%), Elkšņi Parish 22.7 km ^{2} (42% of the total area), Rite Parish 8.1 km ^{2} (15%). The central object of Sauka Nature Park - Lake Sauka, the 15th largest lake in Latvia, is a public water body and is located in the territory of Sauka Parish. The largest settlements of Sauka Nature Park - Lone and Sauka villages are located in the territory of Sauka Nature Park, but Klauce village - in the territory of Elkšņi.

Main goal of establishing Sauka Nature Park is to protect the unique and beautiful landscape and cultural and historical heritage of this area, the research carried out so far has focused mainly on landscape inventory, its ecological, visual and cultural-historical assessment, inventory of cultural and historical objects. The restoration of the tourist trail, known as "Devils trail", was suggested as one of the best options to accommodate and attract visitors to the park.

== Flora ==
Sauka Nature Park is located on the eastern periphery of the geobotanical district of Central Latvia. The composition of flowers and ferns in the nature park is typical of secondary deciduous forests - white alder and birch groves, coniferous forest - spruce forests, and old deciduous forest cover and wet meadow plant communities. To date, no detailed inventory of flowering plants and ferns has been carried out in the protected area. So far, only one plant species to be included in the category of specially protected plants has been identified in Sauka Nature Park. This is a lichen in the second category of the Red Book - Parmelia acetabulum (neck.) Duby. Recently rare fossil of plant Trapa natans has been found in the Lake Sauka.

Park territory has one invasive plant - Sosnowsky's Hogweed (Heracleum sosnowskyi).

In total one species of flora in this site are protected under EU Nature directives:

- 1 flowering plant — hairy agrimony, (Agrimonia pilosa).

== Fauna ==
Three specially protected mammal species have been found in Sauka Nature Park so far: the pond bat - Myotis dasycneme (Boie), the rustic bat - Nyctalus noctula (Schreber), the otter - Lutra lutra (L.) and the beaver - Castor fiber L., which is included In the list of the EP Directive "On the conservation of natural habitats and of wild fauna and flora" (EP Directive 92/43 / EEC, 1992).

In the shallow sections of the river rich in aquatic plants, the mud beetles inhabiting the mud - Misgurnus fossilis - are found. On the other hand, in the clean and unpolluted sections of river streams and flow lakes, there is a stone litter - Cobitis taenia. Both species are included in the Council of Europe Directive on the conservation of natural habitats and of wild fauna and flora.

Two butterfly species included in the "Regulations on the List of Specially Protected Species and Restricted Uses of Specially Protected Species" (Cabinet Regulation No. 396, 2000) have also been found in the protected area - willow iris - Apatura iris L., oak carp - Catocala sponsa L. Bird fauna is richly represented in the nature park. Of the 37 specially protected bird species found in the protected area, 18 are included in the Cabinet of Ministers Regulations "Regulations on the List of Specially Protected Species and Restricted Specially Used Species", and 32 of them in the EP Directive "On the Conservation of Wild Birds" / EEC, 1979).

In total 23 species of fauna in this site are protected under EU Nature directives, including :

- 1 species of amphibians — Northern crested newt, (Triturus cristatus)
- 1 species of invertebrates — hermit beetle, (Osmoderma eremita)
- 2 species of fish — European bitterling, (Rhodeus amarus) and spined loach, (Cobitis taenia)
- 2 species of mammals — Eurasian otter, (Lutra lutra) and pond bat, (Myotis dasycneme)

and

- 17 species of birds.
