= Zasa Manor =

Manor house in Latvia

- Zemgale, Latvia
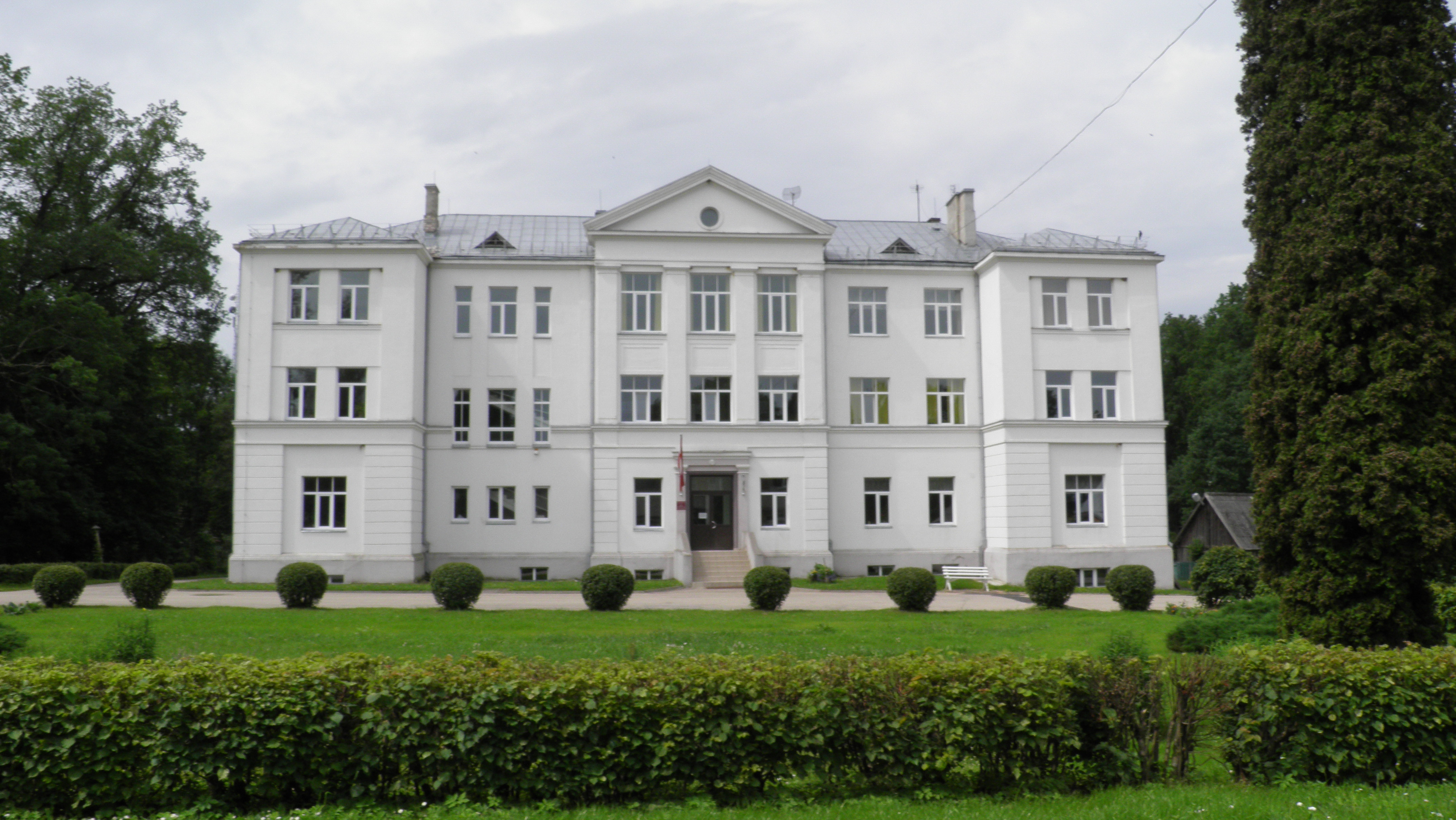
- Zasa secondary school built in 1939 near ruins of Zasa Manor

Site information
- Type: Manor
- Condition: Ruins

Location
- Coordinates: 56°17′35″N 25°58′41″E

Site history
- Demolished: 1905

Zasa Manor (Latvian: Zasas muiža, German: Weessen, Wessen Schloss ) was a manor house in the Zasa Parish of Jēkabpils Municipality, in the historical region of Selonia, in Latvia. Main manor house and other manor buildings were lost to fire during 1905 Russian revolution. A grand Neo-Classical style secondary school was built near the manor ruins in 1939.

== History ==
Manor was property of von Zass noble family from 1644 until the 18th century and thus was called Zasa manor. Last owner was Heinrich von Zass, after whom the Zasulauks neighbourhood of Rīga is named. In 19th century manor belonged to von Greig, the governor of Tsarskoye Selo. Von Greig family built main manor house and other manor buildings on the bank of Zasu River. The manor house was built according to the architectural canons of late classicism. The manor complex also includes a number of outbuildings, such as the summer house, the ice cellar, the brewery, the laundry, the watermill and the miller's house.

In 1905 manor house was ransacked and entire property was heavily damaged by fire as a result of the 1905 Russian revolution and never rebuilt. Only manor cellars and remnants of central avant-corp with round logs have survived. The neo-gothic wooden cottage which was part Zasa manor was also lost to fire. The oldest building that still stands today is the Zasa Lutheran Church, which was built in 1750 as part of the manor complex.

In 1939 in Manor Park the Zasa School Building was built.

== Manor park ==
Planning of the park began in the 18th century, when the manor was still owned by the Sassid. The Greig, who thoroughly explored the castles around St. Petersburg, also added to the park. The 38-hectare free-form park is illustrated by a water mill and cascade at the mill pond. The park is designed in three compositions. There is a white water rose growing in the river, and there are three ponds near the river. Alien species in the park grow white pine, black pine and various cedar pines. Sakhalin Parkworm grows in the undergrowth.

== See also ==
- List of palaces and manor houses in Latvia
