= Kalkūni (disambiguation) =

Kalkūni may refer to:

- Kalkūni, Augšdaugava Municipality, a village in Kalkūne Parish, Augšdaugava Municipality, Latvia
- Kalkūne Parish
- Kalkūni, Daugavpils, a neighbourhood of Daugavpils, Latvia
- Kalkuni, Karnataka, India
