= Sauka =

Sauka may refer to:

- Sauka (surname), Lithuanian surname
- Sauka Parish, Viesīte Municipality, Latvia
- Sauka (village), a village in Sauka Parish
- Sauka Lake, Latvia
- Sauka Nature Park, a protected area in Latvia

== See also ==
- Sauk (disambiguation)
