= Jānis Akuraters =

Latvian writer (1876–1937)

- Akuraters in the 1920s.
- Born: 13 January 1876 "Jaunzemji", Dignāja Parish, Courland Governorate, Russian Empire (Now Ābeļi parish, Jēkabpils Municipality, Latvia)
- Died: 25 July 1937 (aged 61); Rīga, Latvia
- Occupations: Writer, poet, playwright
- Children: Laima Akuratere
- Writing career
- Pen name: Ezops, Polloks
- Notable awards: Order of the Three Stars 3rd Class

Jānis Akuraters (13 January 1876 – 25 July 1937) was a Latvian poet, writer, playwright and politician. He founded the Latvian National Theatre in 1919 and was director of Radio of Riga between 1930 and 1934.

== Biography ==
Akuraters was born on 13 January 1876 in Dignāja parish Jaunzemji homestead (Modern Jēkabpils municipality). His father was a forester. Akuraters studied in a Birži primary school and later in the Jēkabpils city school. After graduation, he passed the teachers exam and started work in schools. 1898 in Elkšņi, 1899–1901 in Jumurda and 1902 in Riga.

In 1903 Akuraters went to Moscow to study medicine however he started to attend law lectures instead. In this period he also started Russian literature studies. In 1904 he returned to Latvia and turned to poetry. Akuraters participated in the Revolution of 1905 one of his most famous poems Ar kaujas saucieniem uz lūpām ('With battle cries on our lips') is dedicated to revolution. After the suppression of the revolution, he was arrested briefly and after release he published art magazine Pret Sauli. In 1907 Akuraters was again arrested and deported to Pskov Oblast, Russia. From there he managed to get to Finland, and from there to Sweden, finally settling in Norway. While in exile Akuraters wrote one of his famous works, his childhood memories Kalpa zēna vasara ('The servant boy's summer'). He returned to Latvia in 1908.

During First World War Akuraters enlisted in the Latvian Rifleman regiment and took part in the famous Christmas Battles. After the war Akuraters turned to politics. He was a member of Latvian National democratic party and was elected as a member of the People's Council in 1918. He participated in the declaration of the independence of Latvia on 18 November 1918. In later years he was a director of art department and director of Latvian Radio. Jānis Akuraters died on 25 July 1937 in Riga. He was awarded the Order of the Three Stars 3rd Class in 1926.

== Legacy ==
Jānis Akuraters house in Riga's Torņakalns neighbourhood built in 1933 by architect Verners Vitands has been restored to its original condition and now houses poet's memorial museum.

== Literature ==
Akuraters first publication was made in 1895 in the magazine Austrums, it was a poem Ziema ('Winter'). During his lifetime are published 10 collections of poetry, 14 plays, many stories and novels. His poetry is close to romanticism but in his prose works dominates expressionism.
