= Sala Municipality, Latvia =

Municipality of Latvia

Coordinates: 56°30′15″N 25°45′44″E

Sala Municipality Salas novads
- Municipality
- Flag Coat of arms

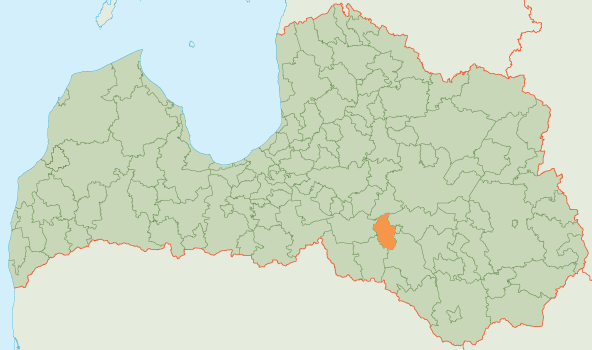
- Country: Latvia
- Formed: 2009
- Centre: Sala

Government
  - Council Chair: Irēna Sproģe (United for Our Municipality)

Area
  - Total: 318.1 km^{2} (122.8 sq mi)

Population (2020)
  - Total: 3,233
  - Density: 10.16/km^{2} (26.32/sq mi)

Sala Municipality (Latvian: Salas novads) is a former municipality in Selonia, Latvia. The municipality was formed in 2009 by merging Sala parish and Sēlpils parish with the administrative centre being Sala. The population in 2020 was 3,233.

On 1 July 2021, Sala Municipality ceased to exist and its territory was merged into Jēkabpils Municipality.

== See also ==
- Administrative divisions of Latvia (2009)
