= Aknīste =

Town in Latvia

- Town
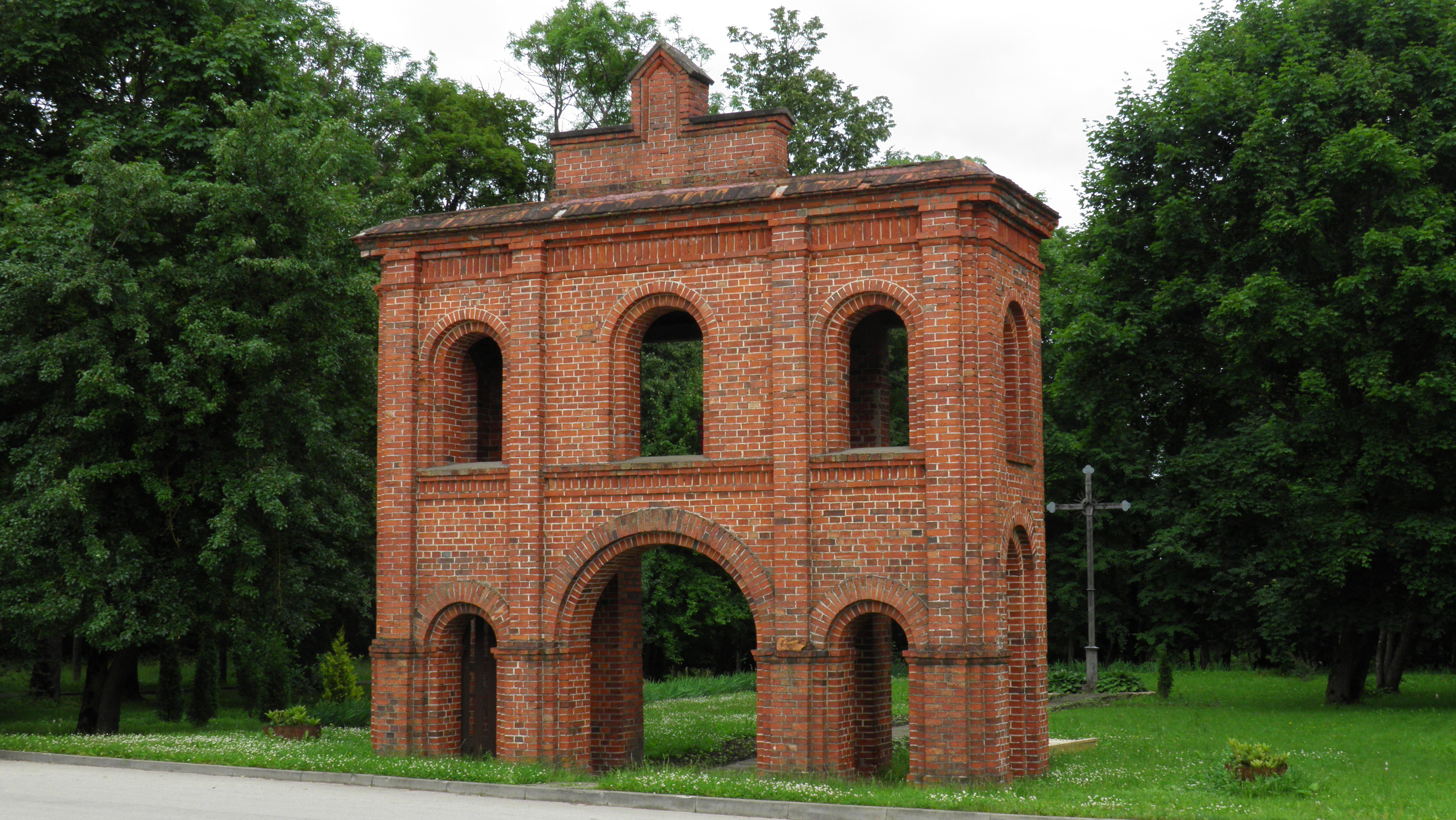
- Gates of the Sēļi Park

- Flag Coat of arms

- Location in Latvia
- Coordinates: 56°09′44″N 25°44′28″E
- Country: Latvia
- Municipality: Jēkabpils Municipality
- Town rights: 1991

Area
  - Total: 2.65 km^{2} (1.02 sq mi)
  - Land: 2.60 km^{2} (1.00 sq mi)
  - Water: 0.05 km^{2} (0.019 sq mi)

Population (2026)
  - Total: 918
  - Density: 353/km^{2} (914/sq mi)
- Time zone: UTC+2 (EET)
  - Summer (DST): UTC+3 (EEST)
- Postal code: LV-5208
- Calling code: +371 652
- Website: www.akniste.lv

Aknīste (Lithuanian: Aknysta; Polish: Oknista) is a town in Jēkabpils Municipality in the Selonia region of Latvia, situated near the Lithuanian border. The town is located near the river Dienvidsusēja. Prior to July 2021, the town was the capital of Aknīste Municipality, and prior to 2009, it was part of Jēkabpils district.

== History ==
The town name, Aknīste, was first mentioned in 1298. From the 17th century, the settlement was a panhandle of Lithuania, and after the partitions of the Polish–Lithuanian Commonwealth, it became a part of the Kovno Governorate of the Russian Empire. During 1918, it was part of Lithuania, but in 1921, Lithuania exchanged Aknīste and several other parishes for Palanga.

The settlement was the site of a mass killing of Jewish residents, during the Nazi occupation of the Baltic States. After German occupation forces arrived in Aknīste around the 25th of June, they created defence groups (Schutzmänner) mainly composed of Latvians. The Aknīste group was commanded by the Latvian War of Independence veteran J. Valdmanis, who had fought against Bolshevik forces as a partisan during the war. On the 17th (or the 4th depending on the source) of July 1941, local Jews were rounded up into the hotel "Austrija", with O. Baltmanis, the commander of the Ilūkste region SS Einsatzgruppe, an unknown SS oberleutnant, and two SS soldiers present, under the premises that the Jews were to be transported to the Daugavpils Ghetto. On the 18th of July, under the orders of O. Baltmanis, and disobeying of said order by J. Valdmanis, the Jews were executed in the yard of the hotel by Baltmanis' Schutzmänner gathered from other parts of Ilūkste.

In 1991, Aknīste was granted its town status.

== Gallery ==
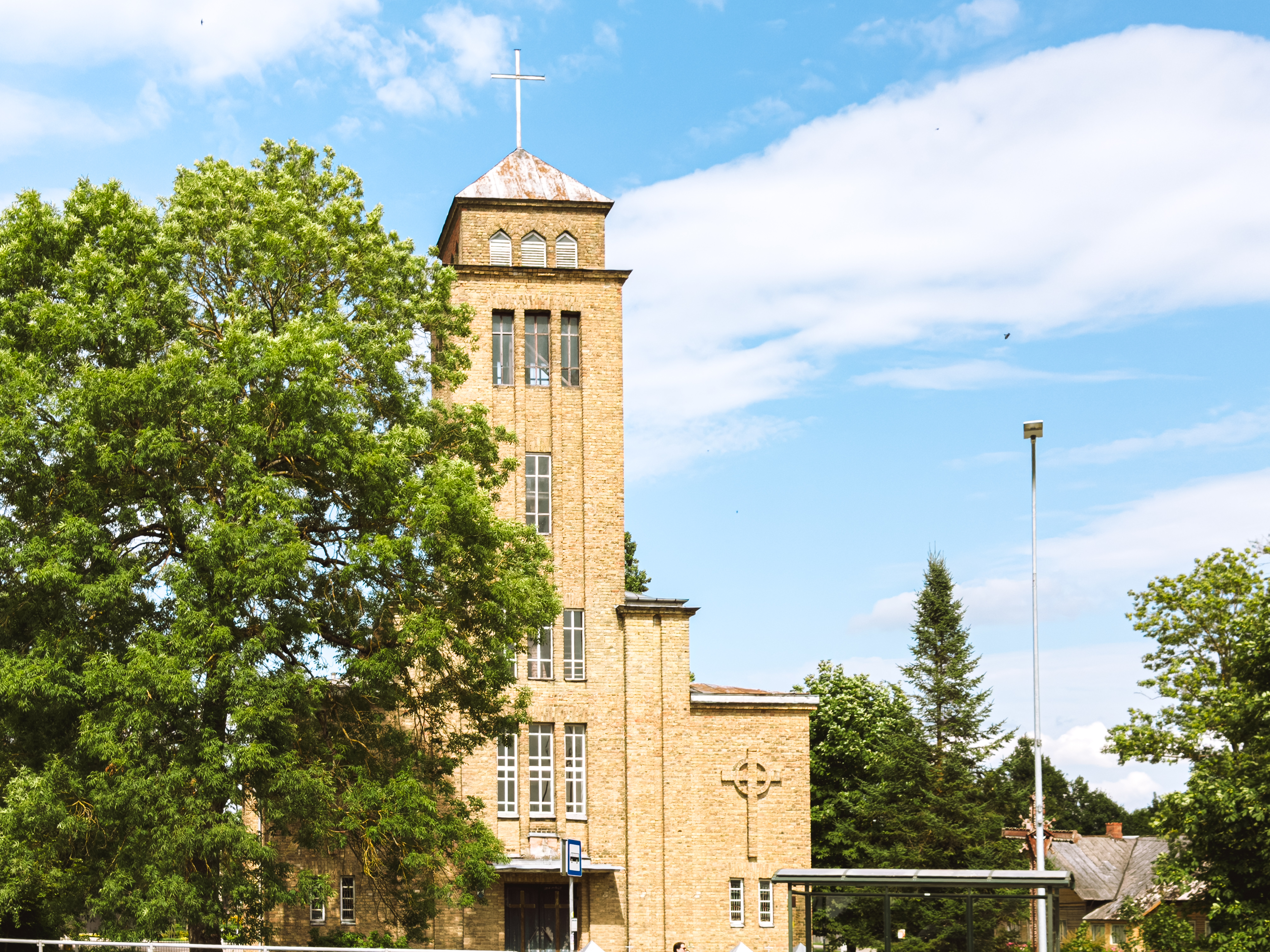
Aknīste catholic church. Built in the 1930s

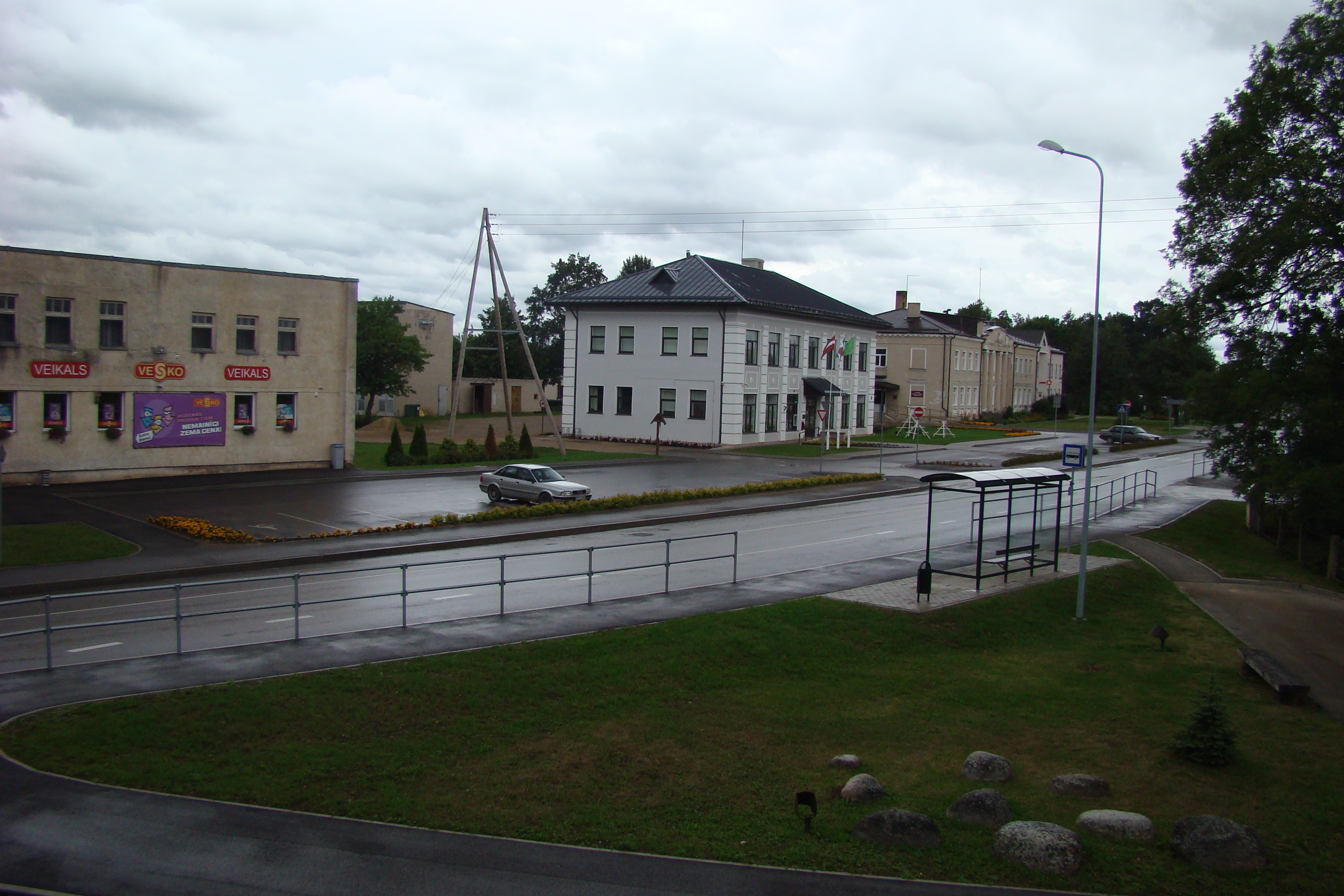
Aknīste town center

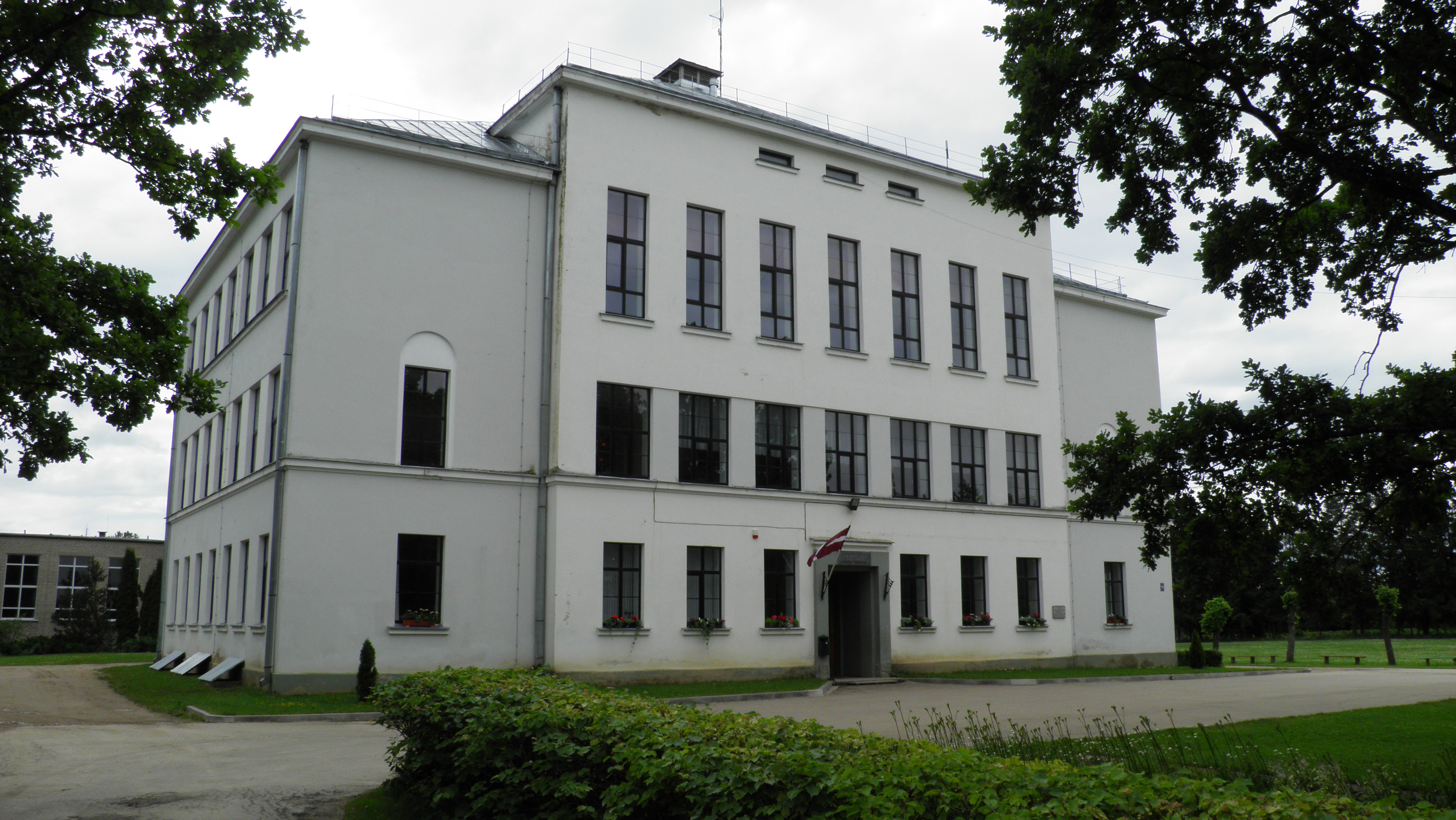
Aknīste secondary school (Built in the 1930s)

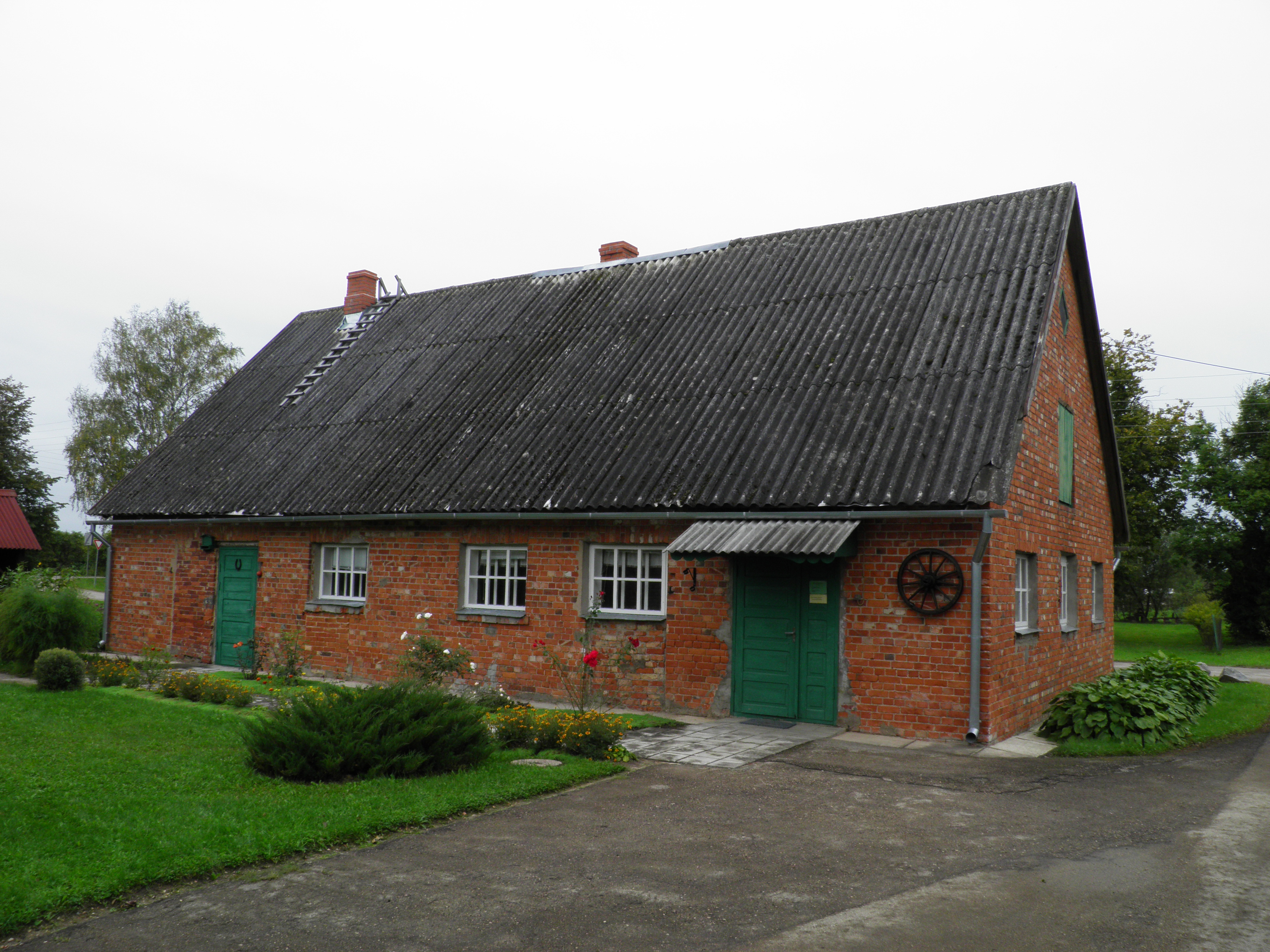
Aknīste local history museum

== See also ==
- List of cities and towns in Latvia
- Jews in Latvia
- The Holocaust in Latvia
