= Sala Parish, Jēkabpils Municipality =

Parish of Latvia

- parish of Latvia
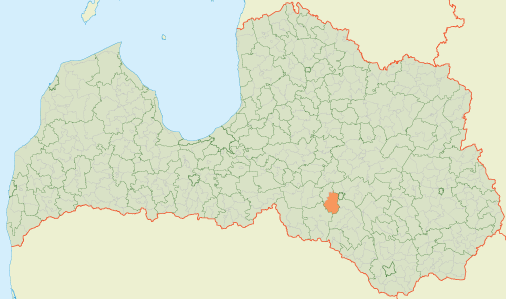
- Coordinates: 56°27′32″N 25°43′33″E
- Country: Latvia

Population (1 January 2026)
  - Total: 2,477

Sala Parish (Latvian: Salas pagasts) is a territorial unit of Jēkabpils Municipality in the Selonia region of Latvia. From 2009 until 2021, it was part of the former Sala Municipality. Prior to 2009, it was part of the former Jēkabpils district.

== Villages ==
- Sala (parish and municipality centre)
- Birži
