= Sala Municipality =

Sala Municipality may refer to:

- Sala Municipality, Sweden
- Sala Municipality, Latvia
