= Sala, Sala Parish =

Village in Latvia

Sala
- Village
- Sala's location in Latvia
- Coordinates: 56°30′14.99″N 25°45′44.06″E
- Country: Latvia
- Municipality: Jēkabpils
- Parish: Sala

Population (2019)
  - Total: 1,350

Sala (German: Holmhof) is a village in Sala Parish, Jēkabpils Municipality in the Selonia region of Latvia.
