= Kalkūni, Augšdaugava Municipality =

Municipality of Latvia

Kalkūni
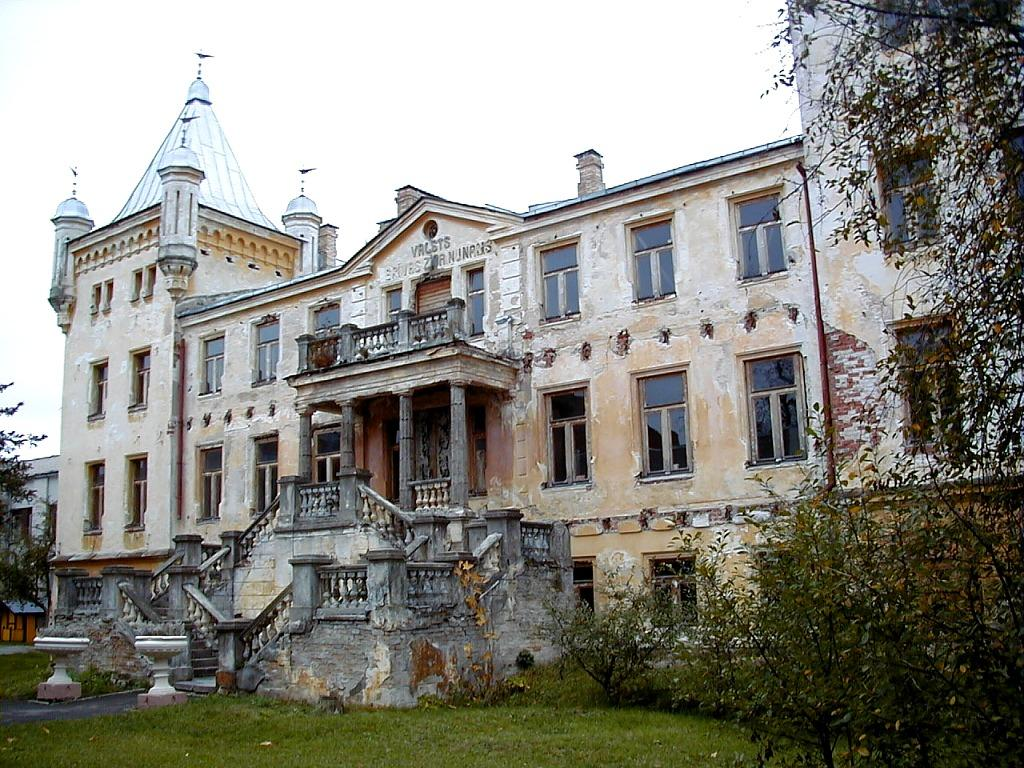
- Kalkūni Castle in 2000

- Location within Latvia
- Coordinates: 55°50′54″N 26°29′26″E
- Country: Latvia
- Municipality: Augšdaugava Municipality

Population
  - Total: 1,132
- Time zone: UTC+2 (EET)
  - Summer (DST): UTC+3 (EEST)

Kalkūni (Lithuanian: Kalkūnai) is the biggest village and the administrative centre of Kalkūne Parish in Augšdaugava Municipality in the Selonia region of Latvia. From 2009 until 2021, it was part of the former Daugavpils Municipality.
