= Viesīte Parish =

Parish of Latvia

- parish of Latvia
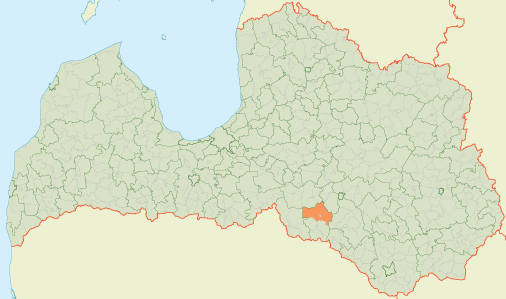
- Coordinates: 56°21′58″N 25°31′36″E
- Country: Latvia

Population (1 January 2026)
  - Total: 507

Viesīte Parish (Latvian: Viesītes pagasts) is an administrative unit of Jēkabpils Municipality in the Selonia region of Latvia. It was created in 2010 from the countryside territory of Viesīte town. At the beginning of 2014, the population of the parish was 704.

== Towns, villages and settlements of Viesīte parish ==
- Eķengrāve
- Jodeļi
- Vārnava
- Viesīte - parish administrative center
