= Rubene Parish =

Parish of Latvia

- parish of Latvia
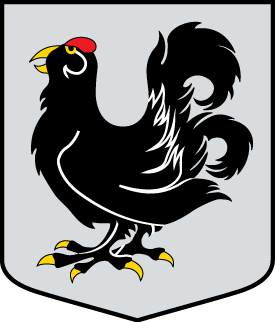
- Coat of arms

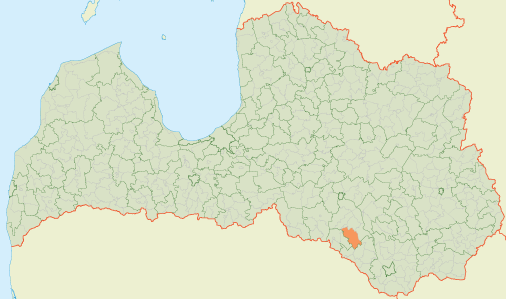
- Coordinates: 56°09′58″N 26°00′35″E
- Country: Latvia

Population (1 January 2026)
  - Total: 722

Rubene Parish (Latvian: Rubenes pagasts) is an administrative territorial entity of Jēkabpils Municipality, in the Selonia region of Latvia. It was an administrative unit of the Jēkabpils district. The administrative center is Rubeņi.

== Towns, villages and settlements of Rubene Parish ==
- Kaldabruņa
- Rubeņi
- Slate

== Gallery ==
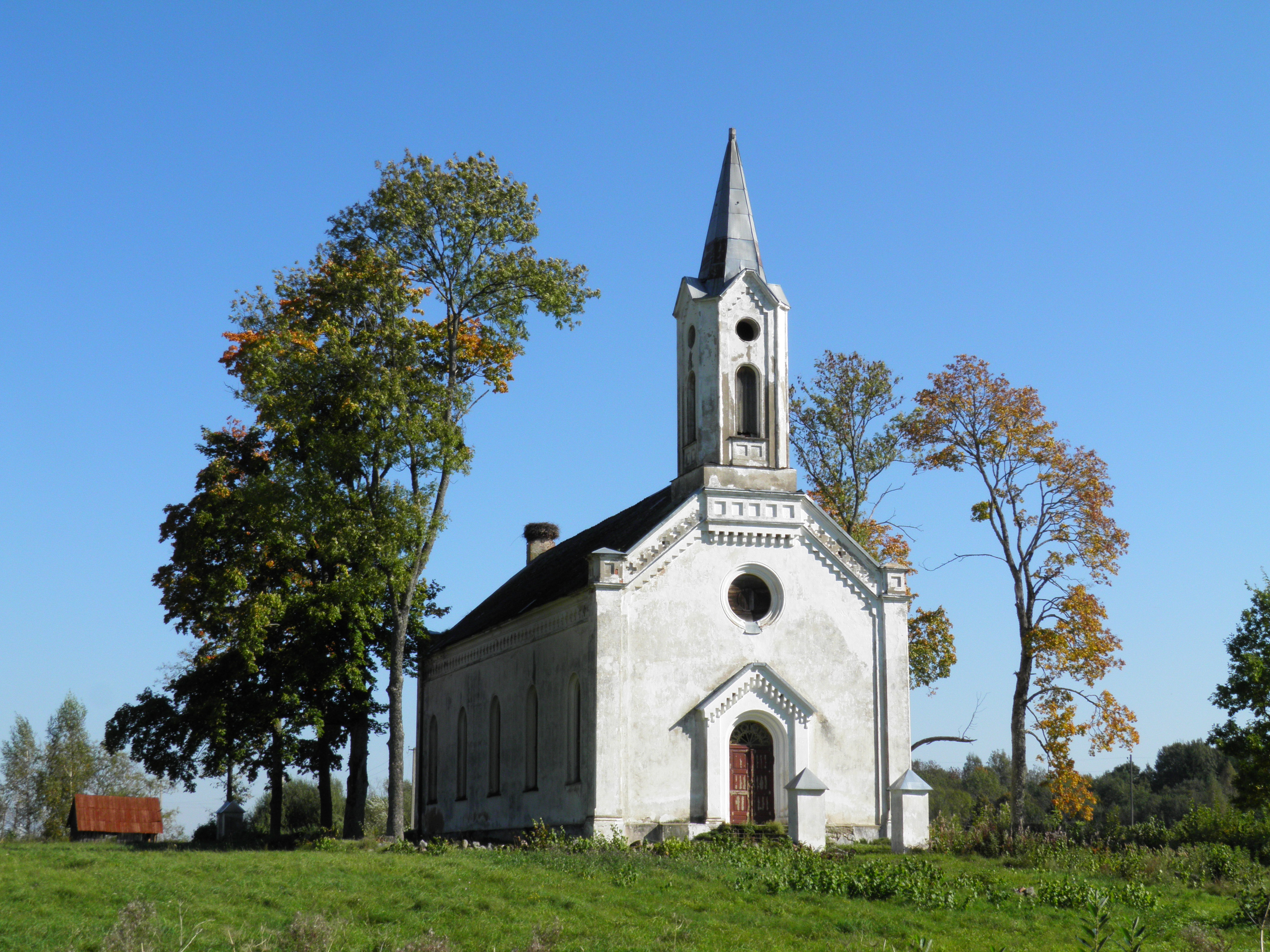
Lutheran church

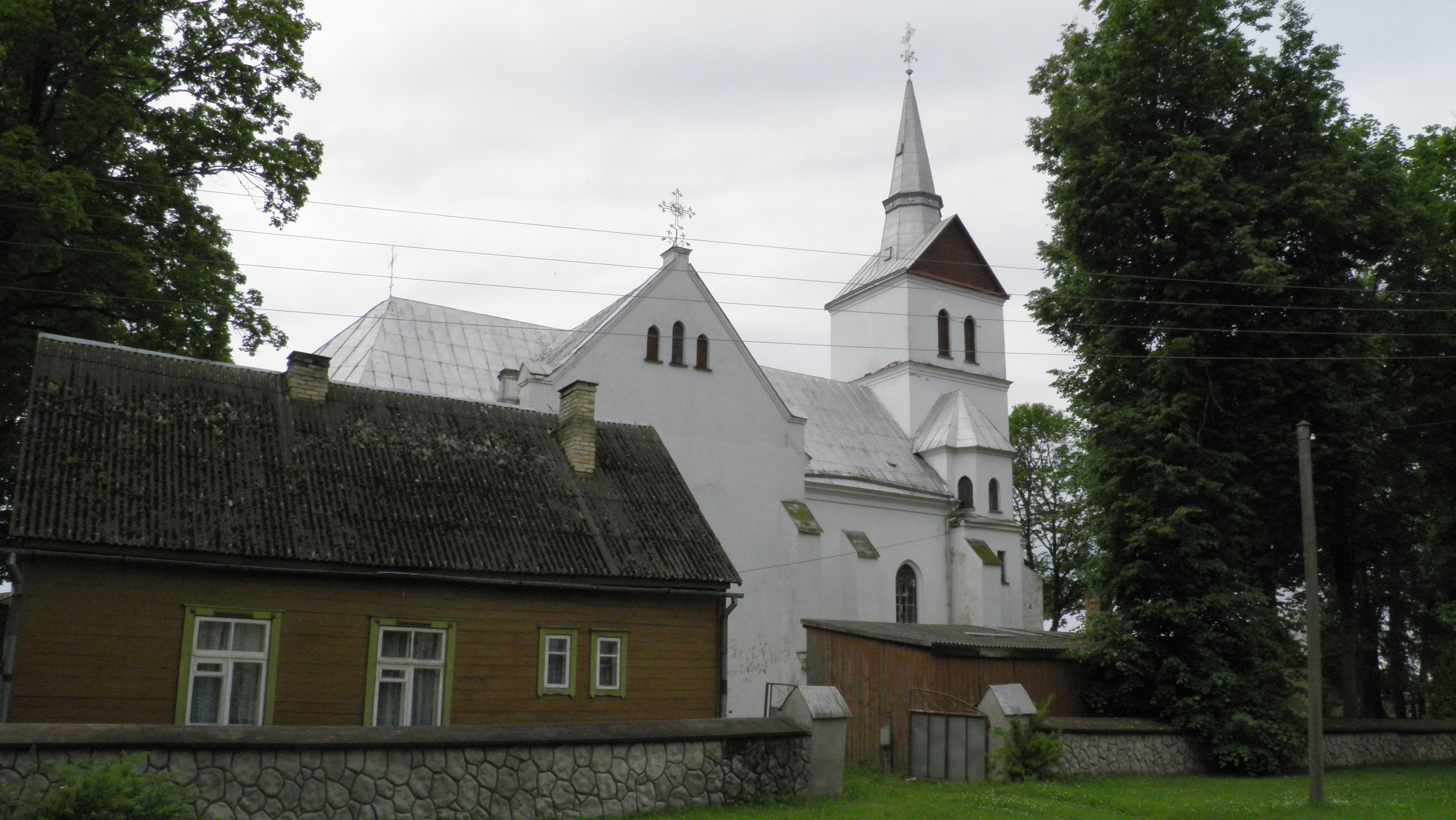
Catholic church

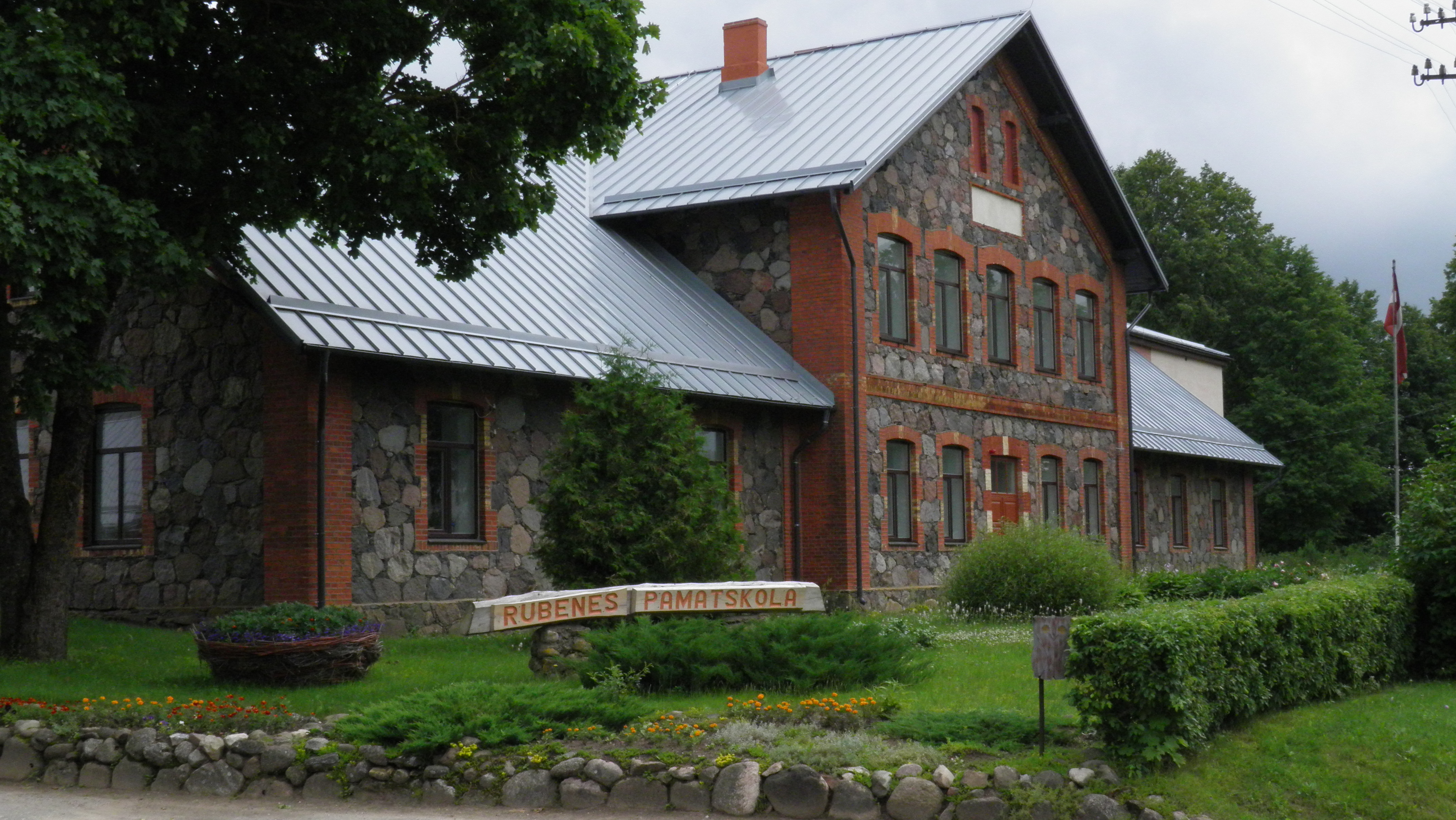
Rubene schoolhouse

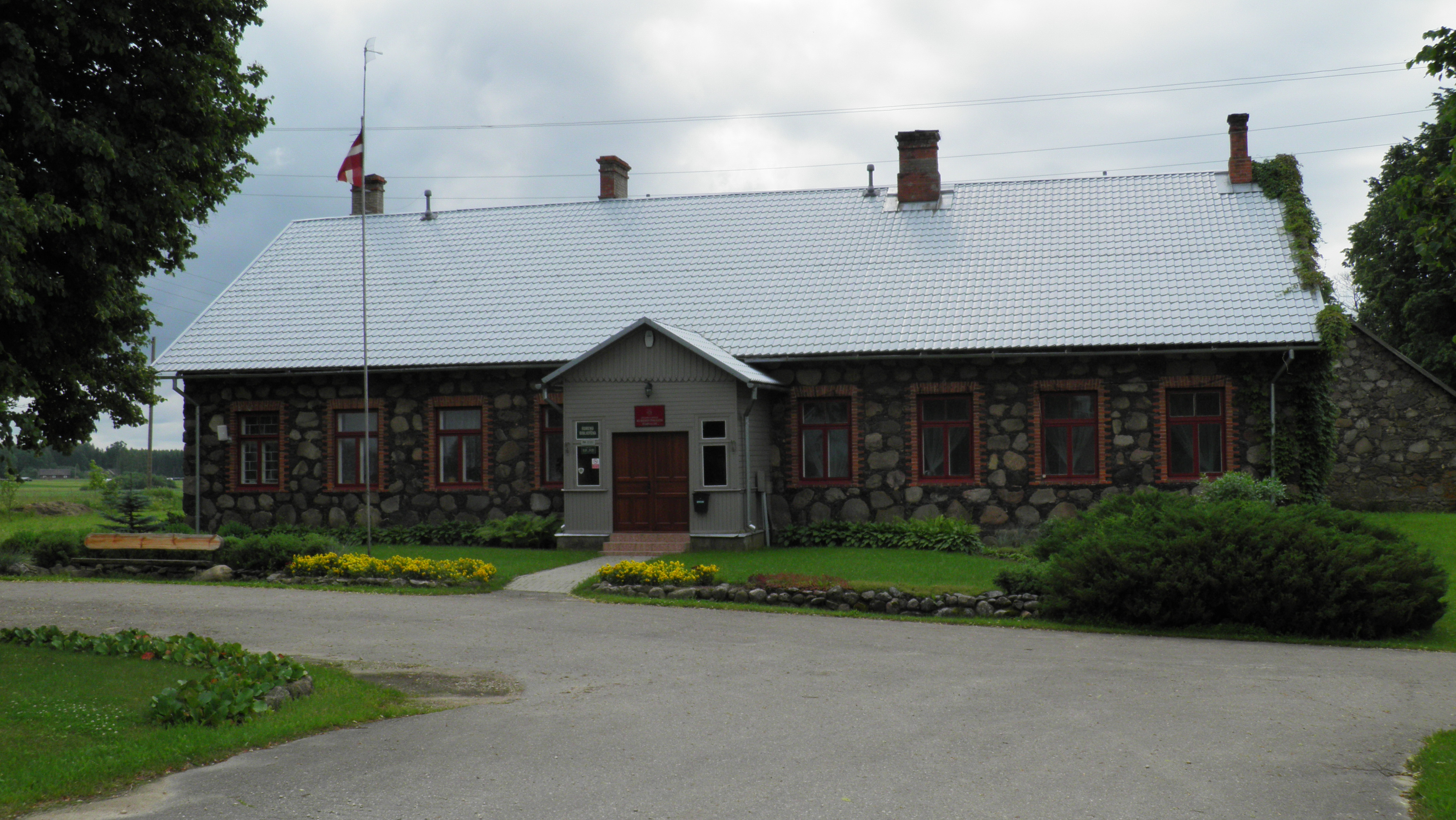
Local government building

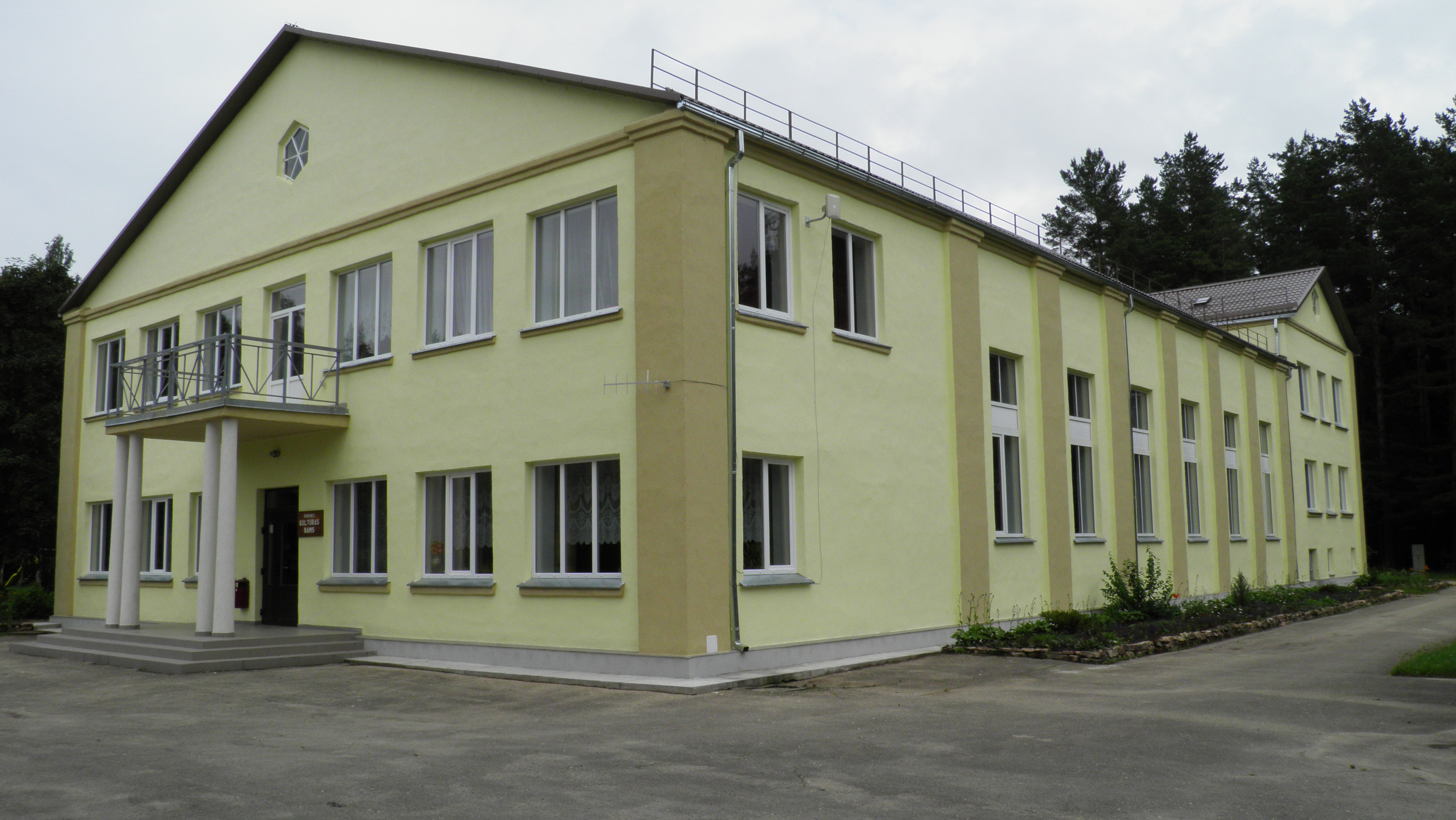
House of culture

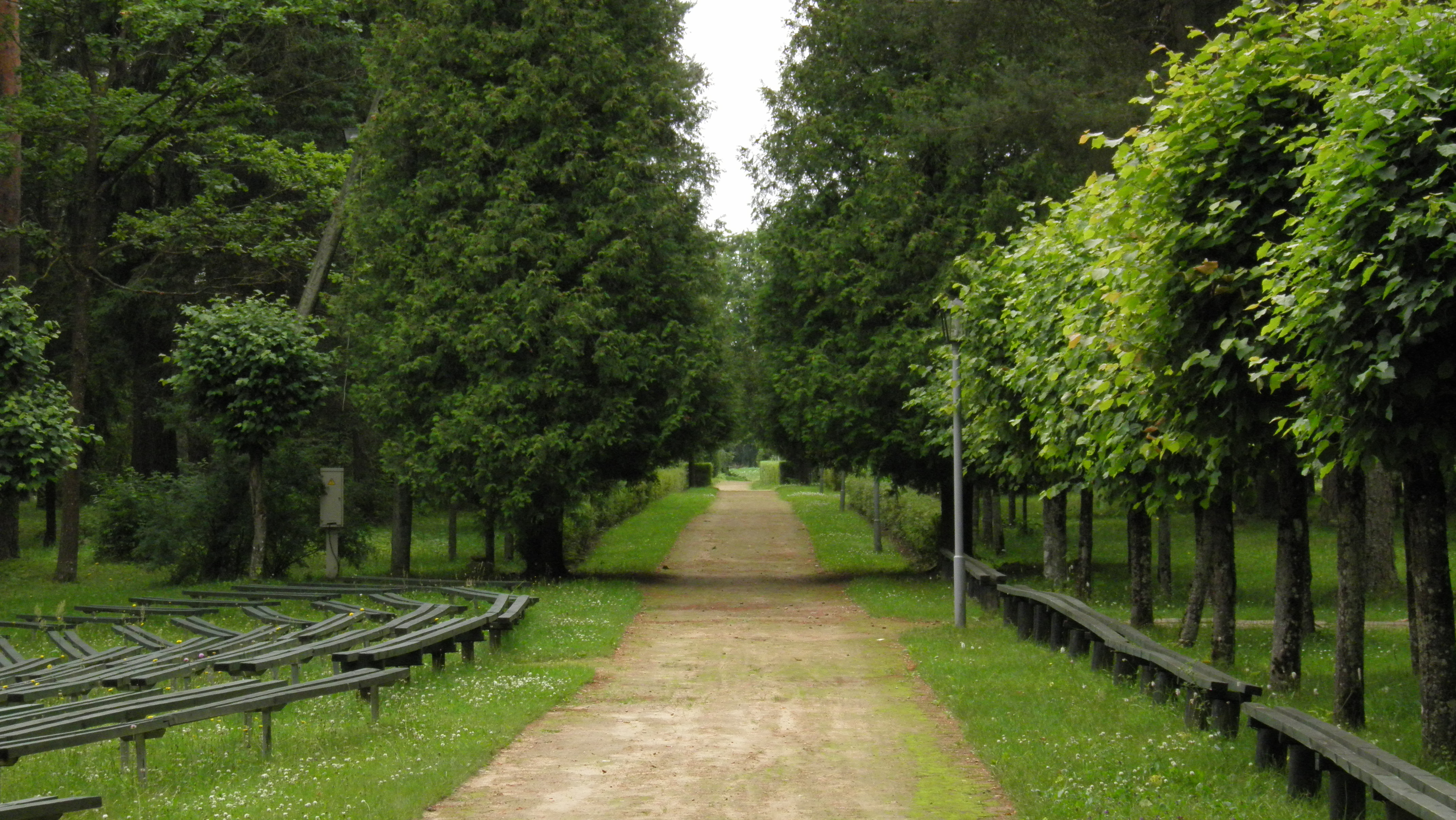
Park

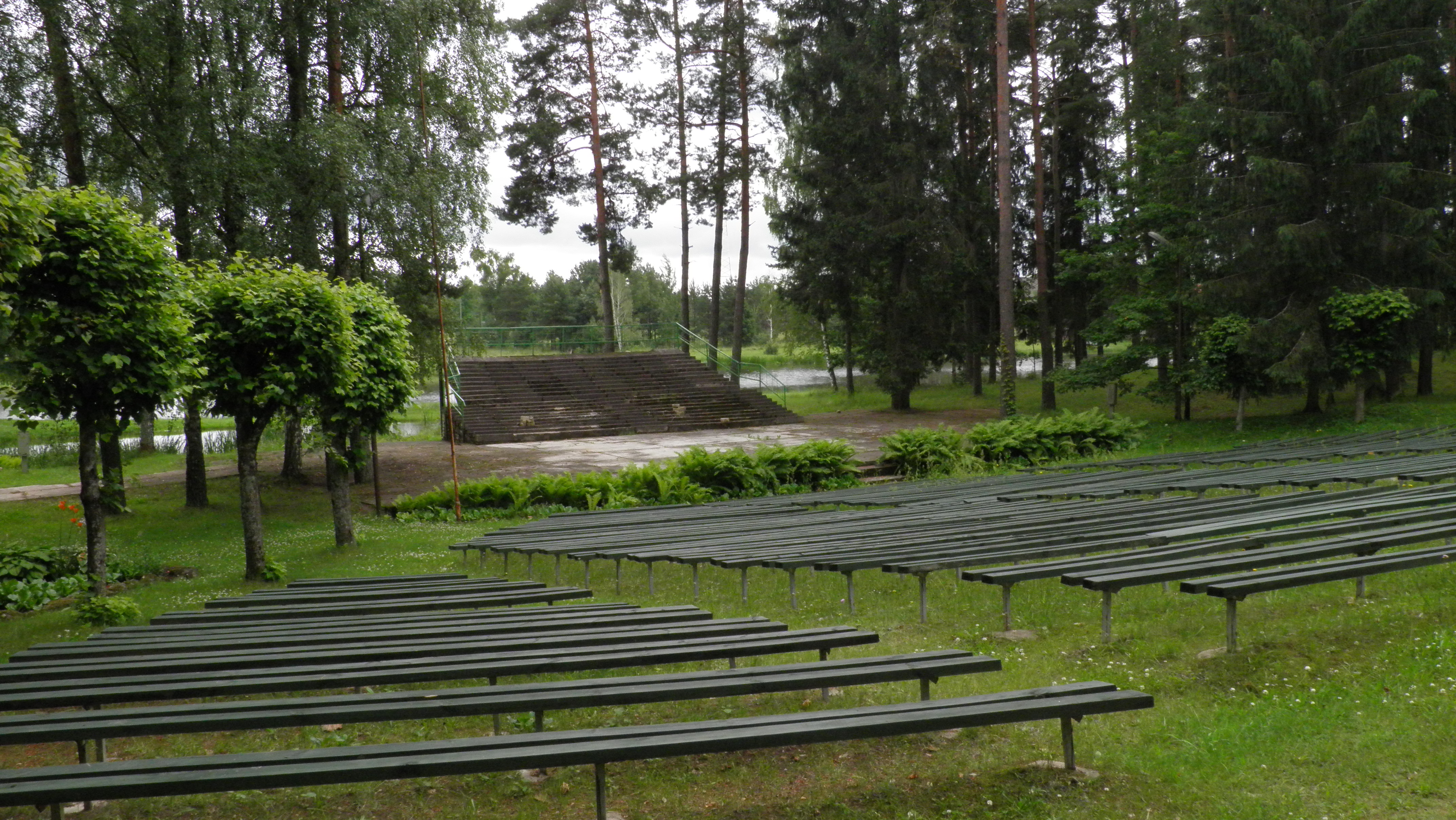
Singing square
