= Gārsene Parish =

Parish of Latvia

- parish of Latvia
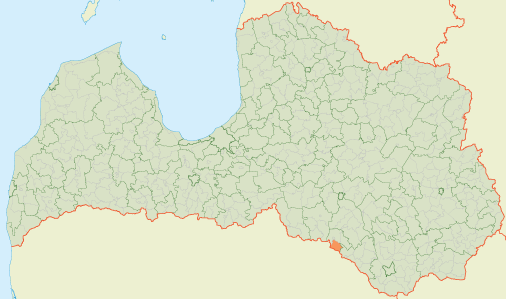
- 56°05′55″N 25°46′47″E
- Country: Latvia

Area
  - Total: 68.02 km^{2} (26.26 sq mi)
  - Land: 67.13 km^{2} (25.92 sq mi)
  - Water: 0.89 km^{2} (0.34 sq mi)

Population (1 January 2024)
  - Total: 671
  - Density: 9.9/km^{2} (26/sq mi)

Gārsene Parish (Latvian: Gārsenes pagasts) is an administrative unit of Jēkabpils Municipality in the Selonia region of Latvia (prior to 2009 it was part of the former Jēkabpils district).
