= Sauca =

Sauca may refer to:

- Saúca, a municipality in Guadalajara, Spain
- Sauca, a commune in Ocnița district, Moldova
- Sauca, a village in Laza Commune, Vaslui County, Romania
- Săuca, a commune in Satu Mare County, Romania
- Săuca (river), Romania
- Sauca, Vaslui, village in Laza commune, Vaslui County, Moldova, Romania

== See also ==
- Sauka (disambiguation)
- Shaucha, Cleanliness in Indic religions and yoga
