= Sauka (surname) =

- Lithuanian surname
- m.: Sauka
- f.: (unmarried): Saukaitė
- f.: (married): Saukienė
- f.: (short): Saukė

- Donatas Sauka (1929–2015), Lithuanian literary scholar, folklore researcher, and writer
- Leonardas Sauka (born 1931), Lithuanian folklorist
- Šarūnas Sauka (born 1958), Lithuanian postmodern painter
- Michael-Fredrick Paul Sauka (1934–1990), poet and a composer from Malawi

== See also ==
- Sauca
