= Prode Parish =

Administrative unit in Latvia

- parish of Latvia
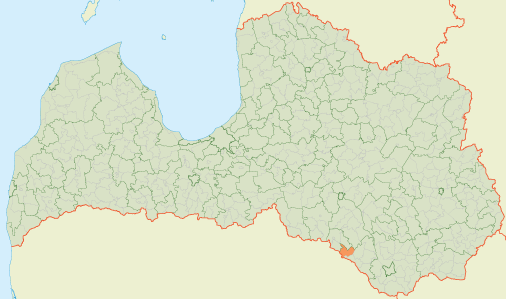
- Coordinates: 56°03′08″N 25°55′39″E
- Country: Latvia

Population (1 January 2026)
  - Total: 177

Prode Parish is an administrative unit of Augšdaugava Municipality in the Selonia region of Latvia.

From its creation in 2009 until 2021, it was part of the former Ilūkste Municipality.
