= Jumurda Parish =

Parish of Latvia

- parish of Latvia
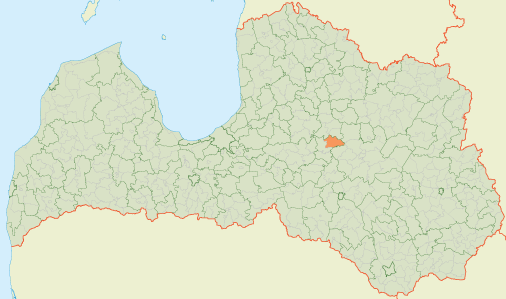
- 56°56′27″N 25°46′40″E
- Country: Latvia

Area
  - Total: 130.28 km^{2} (50.30 sq mi)
  - Land: 125.99 km^{2} (48.65 sq mi)
  - Water: 4.29 km^{2} (1.66 sq mi)

Population (1 January 2024)
  - Total: 221
  - Density: 1.7/km^{2} (4.4/sq mi)

Jumurda Parish (Latvian: Jumurdas pagasts) is an administrative unit of Madona Municipality in the Vidzeme region of Latvia. At the beginning of 2014, the population of the parish was 298. The administrative center is Jumurda village.

== Towns, villages and settlements of Jumurda parish ==
- Jumurda
- Vējava

== See also ==
- Jumurda Manor
