= Vašuoka =

Coordinates: 55°44′N 24°46′E

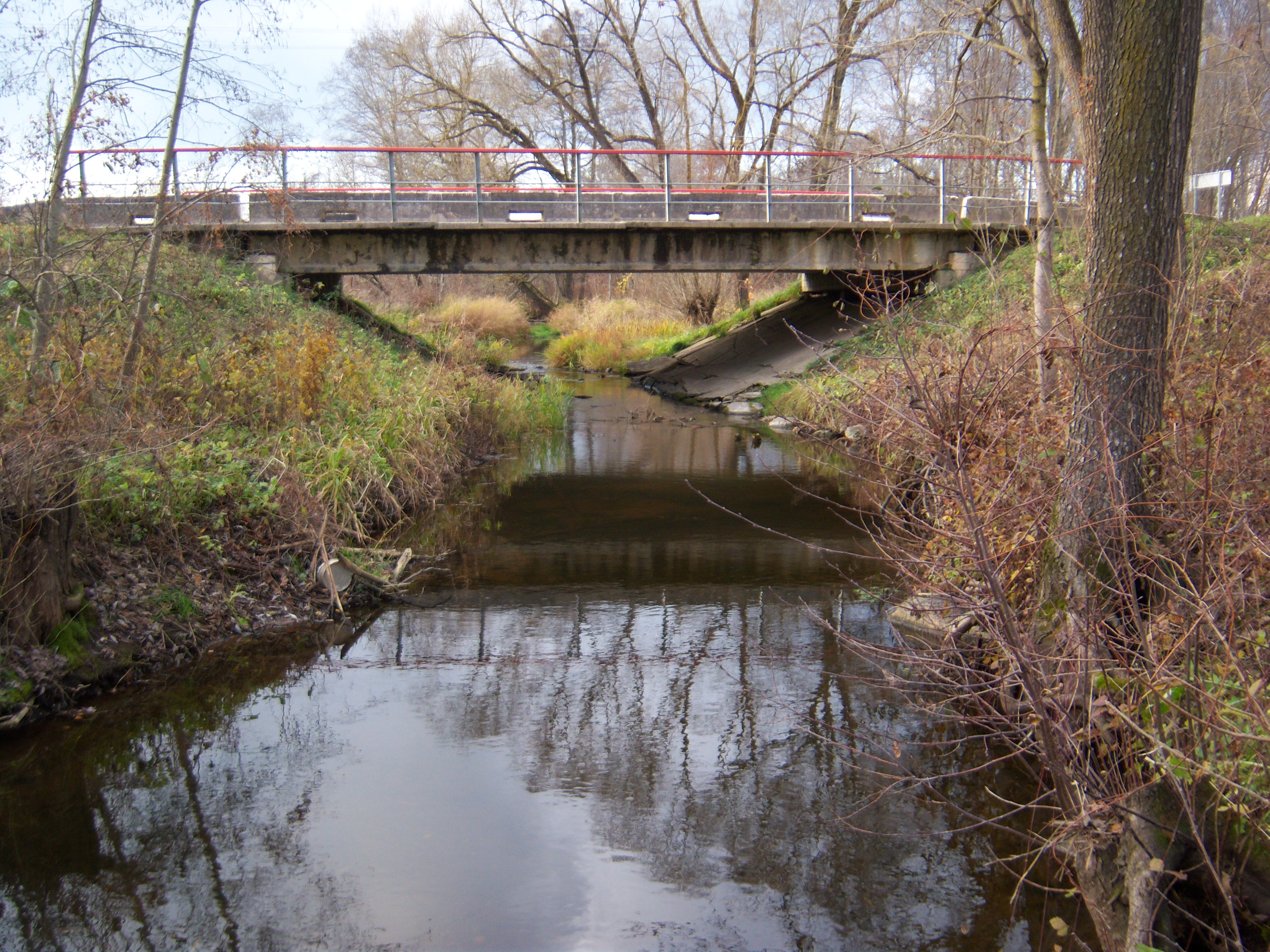

Location
- Country: Lithuania
- Region: Anykščiai district municipality, Utena County

Physical characteristics
- Length: 34 km (21 mi)
- Basin size: 128 km^{2} (49 sq mi)

Vašuoka is a river of Anykščiai district municipality, Utena County, northeastern Lithuania. It flows for 34 kilometres (21 mi) and has a basin area of 128 km^{2} (49 sq mi).
