= Dunava Parish =

Parish of Latvia

- parish of Latvia
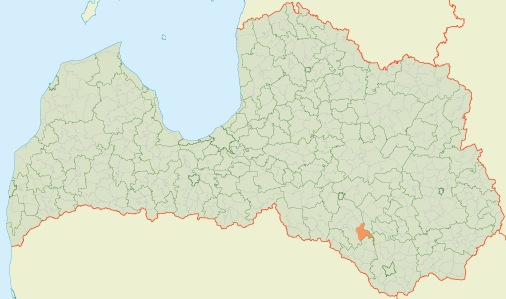
- Coordinates: 56°11′45″N 26°10′54″E
- Country: Latvia

Population (1 January 2026)
  - Total: 443

Dunava Parish (Latvian: Dunavas pagasts) is an administrative unit of Jēkabpils Municipality, in the Selonia region of Latvia.
