= Jumurda Manor =

Manor house in Latvia

Coordinates: 56.9432°N 25.7292°E

- Vidzeme, Latvia
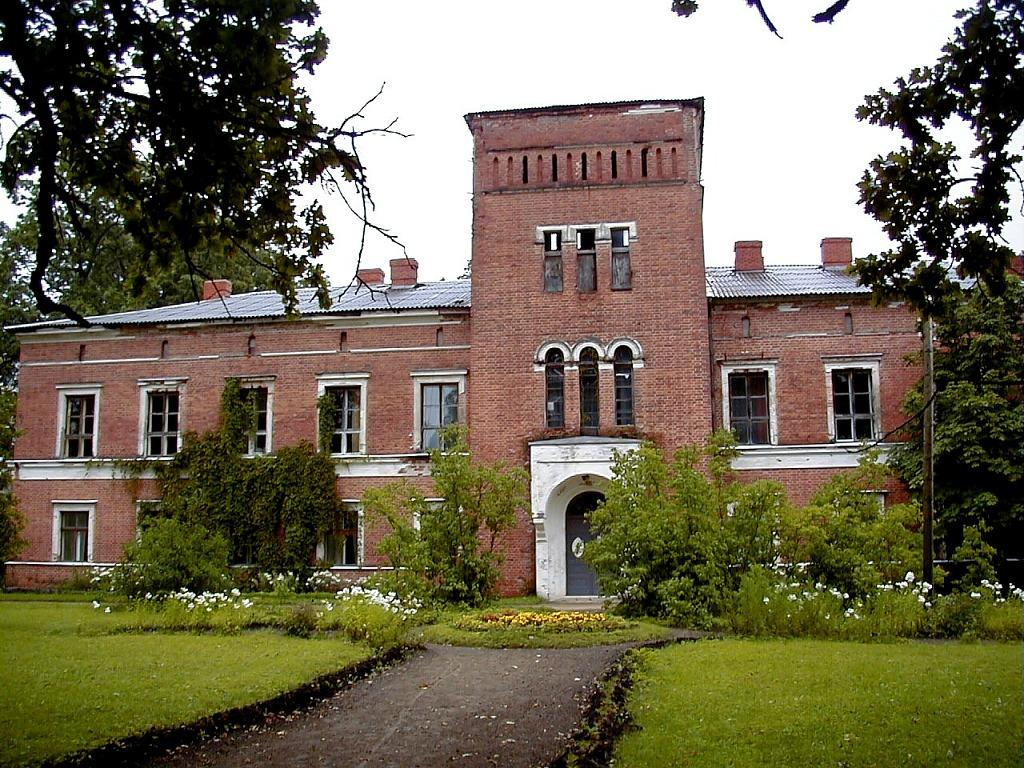

Site information
- Type: Manor

Site history
- Built: 1856

Jumurda Manor (Latvian: Jumurdas muižas pils) is a manor house in Jumurda Parish, Madona Municipality in the Vidzeme region of Latvia. It was built after 1856 in Eclectic style. Vandalized during the Revolution of 1905, the manor was restored in 1907. After 1929 it housed the Jumurda primary school for many years. The estate buildings and manor house are gradually being renovated to create a resort hotel complex.

== See also ==
- List of palaces and manor houses in Latvia
