= Leimaņi Parish =

Parish of Latvia

- parish of Latvia
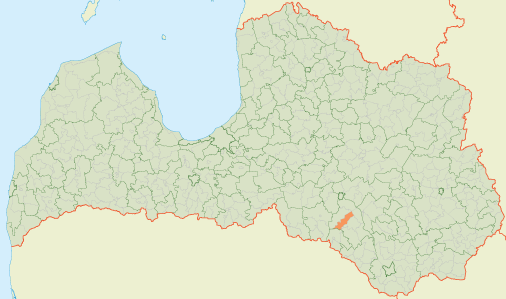
- Coordinates: 56°17′53″N 25°54′19″E
- Country: Latvia

Population (1 January 2026)
  - Total: 353

Leimaņi parish (Latvian: Leimaņu pagasts) is an administrative territorial entity of Jēkabpils Municipality, in the Selonia region of Latvia.
