= Rite Parish =

Parish of Latvia

- parish of Latvia
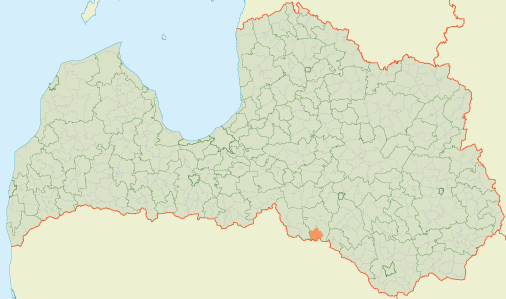
- Coordinates: 56°11′38″N 25°29′05″E
- Country: Latvia

Population (1 January 2026)
  - Total: 414

Rite Parish (Latvian: Rites pagasts) is an administrative territorial entity of Jēkabpils Municipality in the Selonia region of Latvia. Prior to 2009, it was an administrative unit of the former Jēkabpils district. The administrative center is Cīruļi village.

== Towns, villages and settlements of Rite Parish ==
- Cīruļi
- Kacīte
- Rite
