= Kalna Parish =

Parish of Latvia

- parish of Latvia, administrative division
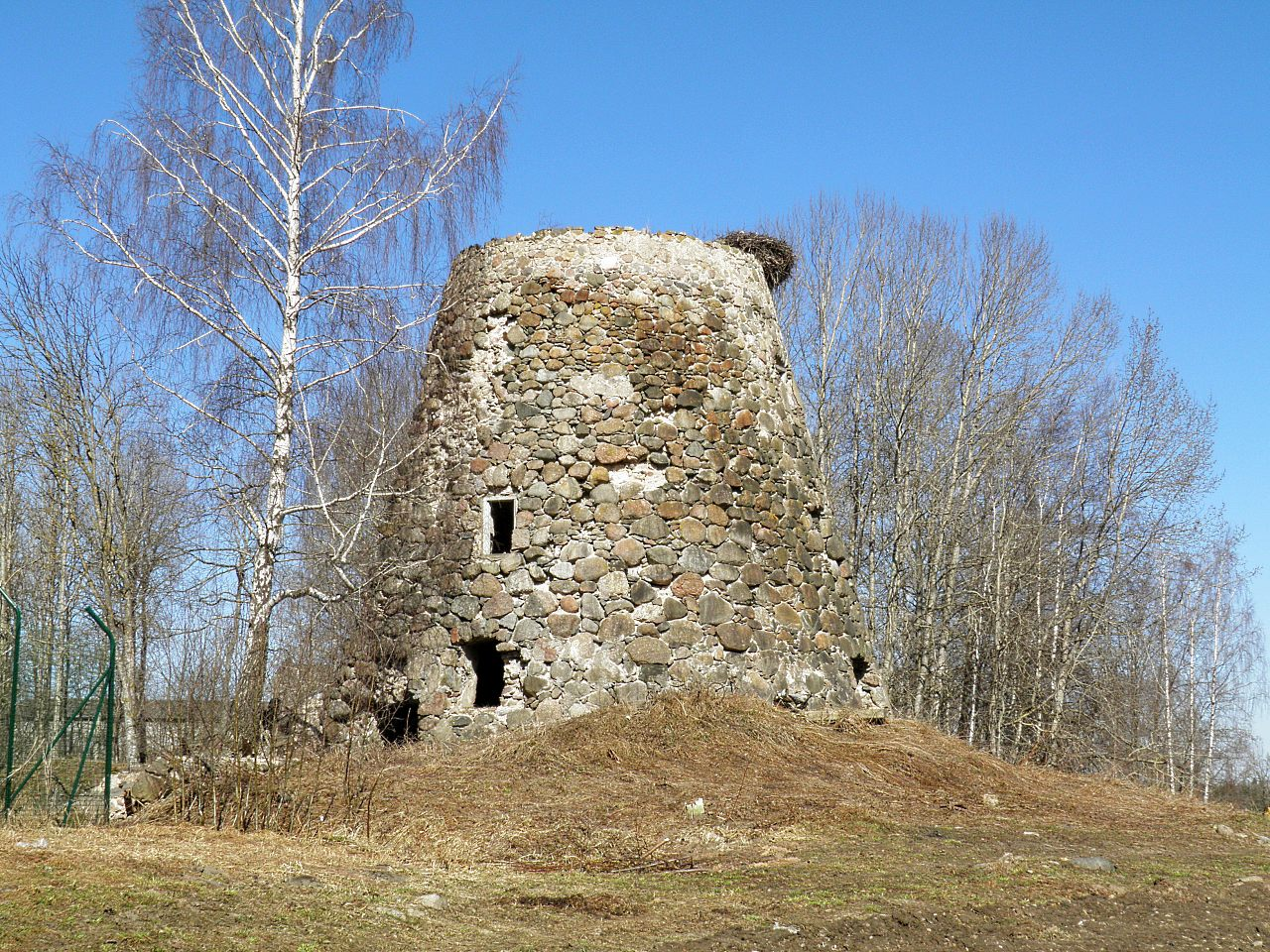

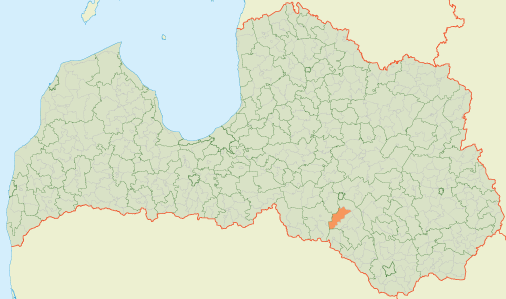
- Coordinates: 56°19′50″N 25°49′22″E
- Country: Latvia

Population (1 January 2026)
  - Total: 467

Kalna parish (Latvian: Kalna pagasts) is an administrative unit of Jēkabpils Municipality, in the Selonia region of Latvia
