= Pauls Dauge =

Latvian dentist, communist and writer

Pauls Dauge (August 22, 1869 in Sauka Parish – February 9, 1946 in Riga) was a Latvian dentist, Bolshevik revolutionary activist, writer and publicist.

Born in to the family of a teacher, he was the younger brother of the educator and future minister Aleksandrs Dauge. Dauge formed part of the New Current group of Latvian intellectuals (along with Pēteris Stučka) that advocated Marxist thought. He graduated from the Moscow Dental School in 1897, and went on to study at a dental college in Berlin. In 1904 he met with Vladimir Lenin, abroad. He worked in Moscow for a few years. During the period 1905–1907 he was active in a literary lecturing team of the Russian Social Democratic Labour Party (of which he had become a member in 1903). His underground party name was 'Pik'. Dauge translated various works of Friedrich Engels into Latvian language. He also worked with the Bolshevik newspapers Borba and Svetoch. He was a delegate to the second and third congresses of the Social Democracy in the Latvian Territory.

He took part in the October Revolution in Moscow. In 1918 he was named Chief of the Dental Section of the People's Commissariat of Public Health of the Russian Socialist Federal Soviet Republic, a position he would hold until 1928. In 1923 he founded the journal Одонтология и стоматология ('Odontology and Dentistry'). In 1928 the Moscow State Scientific and Practical Dentistry Institute was founded, upon the proposal of Dauge. He began research work in Riga and Moscow, and lectured at the Moscow Institute. Dauge became a member of the International Dental Academy based in Washington, DC in 1929, and was named Honorary Member of Vienna Dental Society in 1931.

He was a delegate at the 8th and 15th congresses of the Communist Party of the Soviet Union.

Dauge was arrested during the Great Purge but was released after being interrogated multiple times. In 1945 he was awarded the Worker of Culture Honour of the Latvian SSR.
