= Asare Parish =

Parish in Jēkabpils Municipality, Latvia

- parish of Latvia
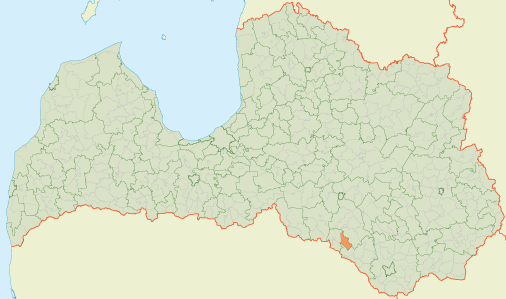
- 56°07′52″N 25°54′45″E
- Country: Latvia

Area
  - Total: 83.88 km^{2} (32.39 sq mi)
  - Land: 81.99 km^{2} (31.66 sq mi)
  - Water: 1.89 km^{2} (0.73 sq mi)

Population (1 January 2026)
  - Total: 330
  - Density: 4.0/km^{2} (10/sq mi)

Asare Parish (Latvian: Asares pagasts) is an administrative unit of Jēkabpils Municipality in the Selonia region of Latvia. The administrative center is the village of Asare.
