= Kalkūne Parish =

Parish of Latvia

- parish of Latvia
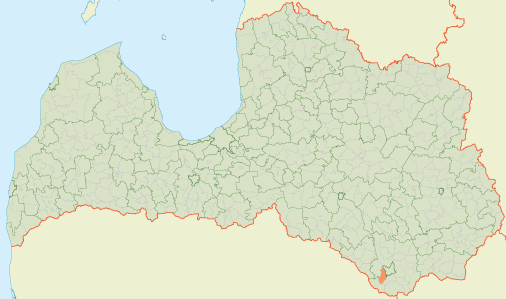
- 55°50′19″N 26°26′07″E

- Location within Latvia
- Country: Latvia, Second Polish Republic

Area
  - Total: 67.16 km^{2} (25.93 sq mi)
  - Land: 65.25 km^{2} (25.19 sq mi)
  - Water: 1.91 km^{2} (0.74 sq mi)

Population (1 January 2026)
  - Total: 1,641
  - Density: 25.15/km^{2} (65.14/sq mi)
- Website: kalkuni.lv

Kalkūne Parish (Latvian: Kalkūnes pagasts) is an administrative unit of Augšdaugava Municipality in the Selonia region of Latvia.
