= Elkšņi Parish =

Parish of Latvia

- parish of Latvia
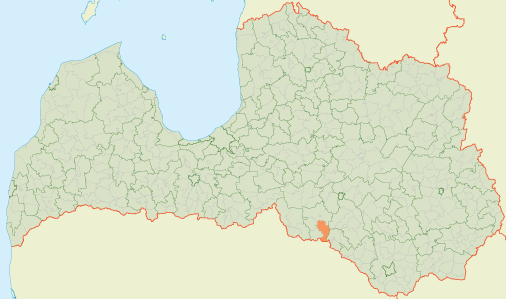
- Coordinates: 56°13′51″N 25°36′02″E
- Country: Latvia

Population (1 January 2026)
  - Total: 346

Elkšņi Parish (Latvian: Elkšņu pagasts) is an administrative unit of Jēkabpils Municipality in the Selonia region of Latvia. The administrative center is Elkšņi village.

== Towns, villages and settlements of Elkšņi parish ==
- Apserde
- Elkšņi
- Klauce
