= Sauka Parish =

Parish of Latvia

- parish of Latvia
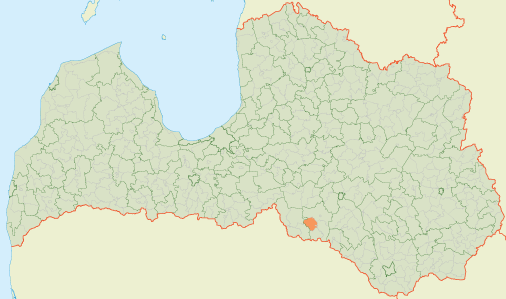
- Coordinates: 56°17′06″N 25°25′04″E
- Country: Latvia

Population (1 January 2026)
  - Total: 434

Sauka Parish (Latvian: Saukas pagasts) is an administrative unit of Jēkabpils Municipality in the Selonia region of Latvia. Prior to 2009, it was an administrative unit of the former Jēkabpils district. The administrative center is Lone, Latvia village.

== Towns, villages and settlements of Sauka parish ==
- Brieži
- Galvāni
- Lone, Latvia - parish administrative center
- Sauka

== See also ==
- Pauls Dauge
