= Zasa Parish =

Parish of Latvia

- parish of Latvia
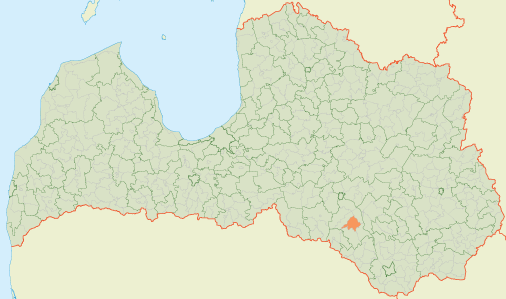
- 56°16′22″N 26°01′25″E
- Country: Latvia

Area
  - Total: 114.57 km^{2} (44.24 sq mi)
  - Land: 112.76 km^{2} (43.54 sq mi)
  - Water: 1.81 km^{2} (0.70 sq mi)

Population (1 January 2025)
  - Total: 682
  - Density: 6.05/km^{2} (15.7/sq mi)

Zasa parish (Latvian: Zasas pagasts) is an administrative unit of Jēkabpils Municipality, in the Selonia region of Latvia.
