= Viesīte =

Town in Jēkabpils Municipality, Latvia

- Town
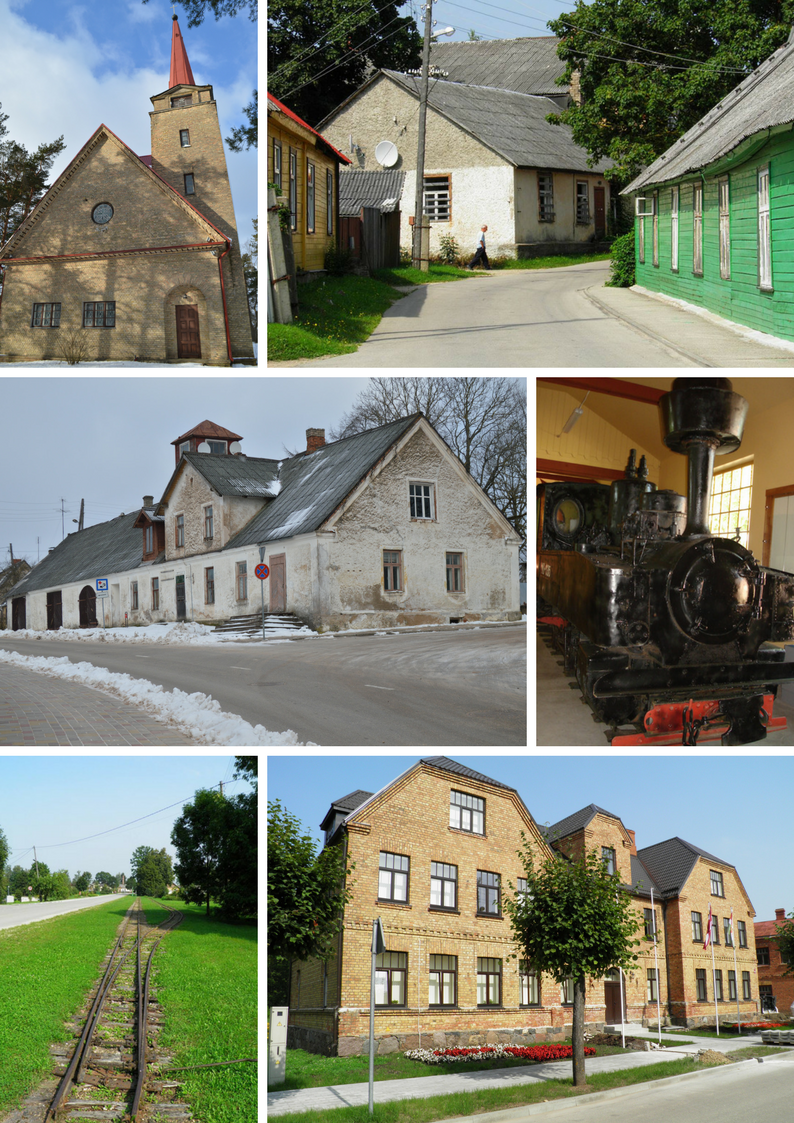

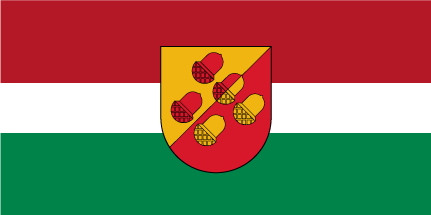
- Flag Coat of arms

- Location in Latvia
- Coordinates: 56°21′N 25°33′E
- Country: Latvia
- District: Jēkabpils Municipality
- Town rights: 1928

Government
  - Mayor: Alfons Žuks

Area
  - Total: 2.30 km^{2} (0.89 sq mi)
  - Land: 2.28 km^{2} (0.88 sq mi)
  - Water: 0.02 km^{2} (0.0077 sq mi)
  - Rural territory: 311.1 km^{2} (120.1 sq mi)
- Elevation: 110 m (360 ft)

Population (2026)
  - Total: 1,467
  - Density: 643/km^{2} (1,670/sq mi)
- Time zone: UTC+2 (EET)
  - Summer (DST): UTC+3 (EEST)
- Calling code: +371 652
- Number of city council members: 9
- Website: http://www.viesite.lv

Viesīte (Lithuanian: Viesytė; German: Eckengrafen) is a town in the western part of Jēkabpils Municipality in the Selonia region of Latvia. The population in 2020 was 1,500.

Viesīte is a typical Selonia town located in the hills in the centre of the district. Selonia is a cultural and historical district, bordering on Latgale, Zemgale (Semigalia), Vidzeme and Lithuania.

Viesīte town (previously called Eckengraf, Eķengrāve, Azu village) is situated on the crossroads of important trunk roads: Jēkabpils-Nereta, Akniste-Riga. The distance to Jēkabpils is 32 km, to Riga 130 km, and to the Lithuanian border 31 km.

The coat of Arms of Viesīte town depicts five golden acorns against a purple background, symbolising power. On the flag of Viesīte are the colours of Selonia district flag - green, white and red - with the coat of arms of Viesīte in the center.

Viesīte Town and Rural territory Council consists of 9 deputies. The Council Chairman is Janis Dimitrijevs. There are four permanent committees working in the municipality:

- Finance committee,
- Social, educational and culture affairs committee,
- Territorial development and business facilitation committee,
- Agriculture and land affairs committee.

The council deputies together with municipality people have organised several committees for problem solving and implementation of separate functions of the council.

The most interesting objects in Viesite are: the little engine, ViesIte Culture Castle, Memorial room and places of Professor Pauls Stradiņš, memorial room of writer Anna Brodele, Viesīte Brīvibas (Freedom) Church, Viesīte museum of local history "Selonia".

== Twin towns — sister cities ==
Viesīte is twinned with:

- Czeladź, Poland
- Pastavy District, Belarus
- Rokiškis, Lithuania
- Zhydachiv, Ukraine

== Gallery ==
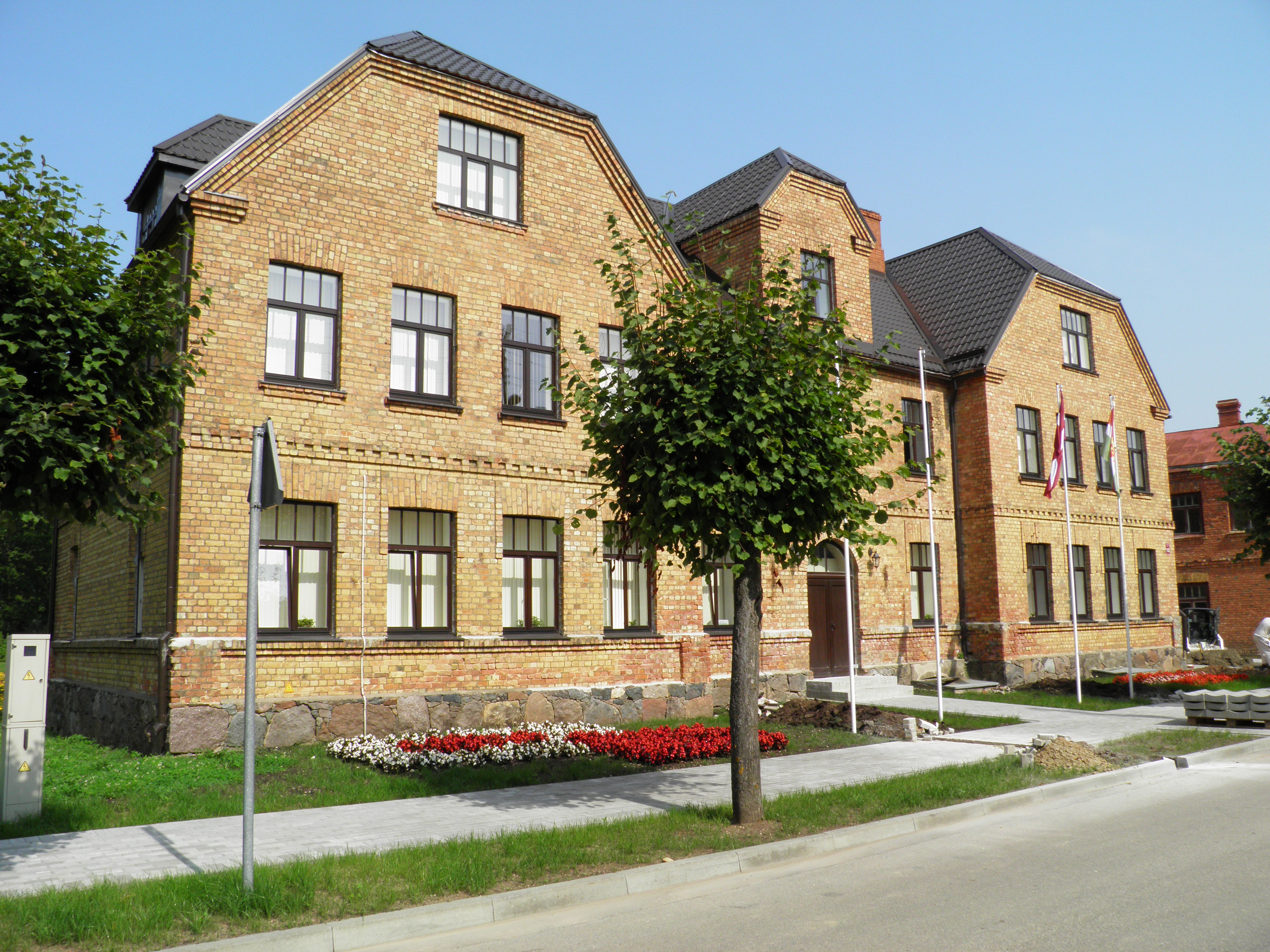
Viesīte town hall

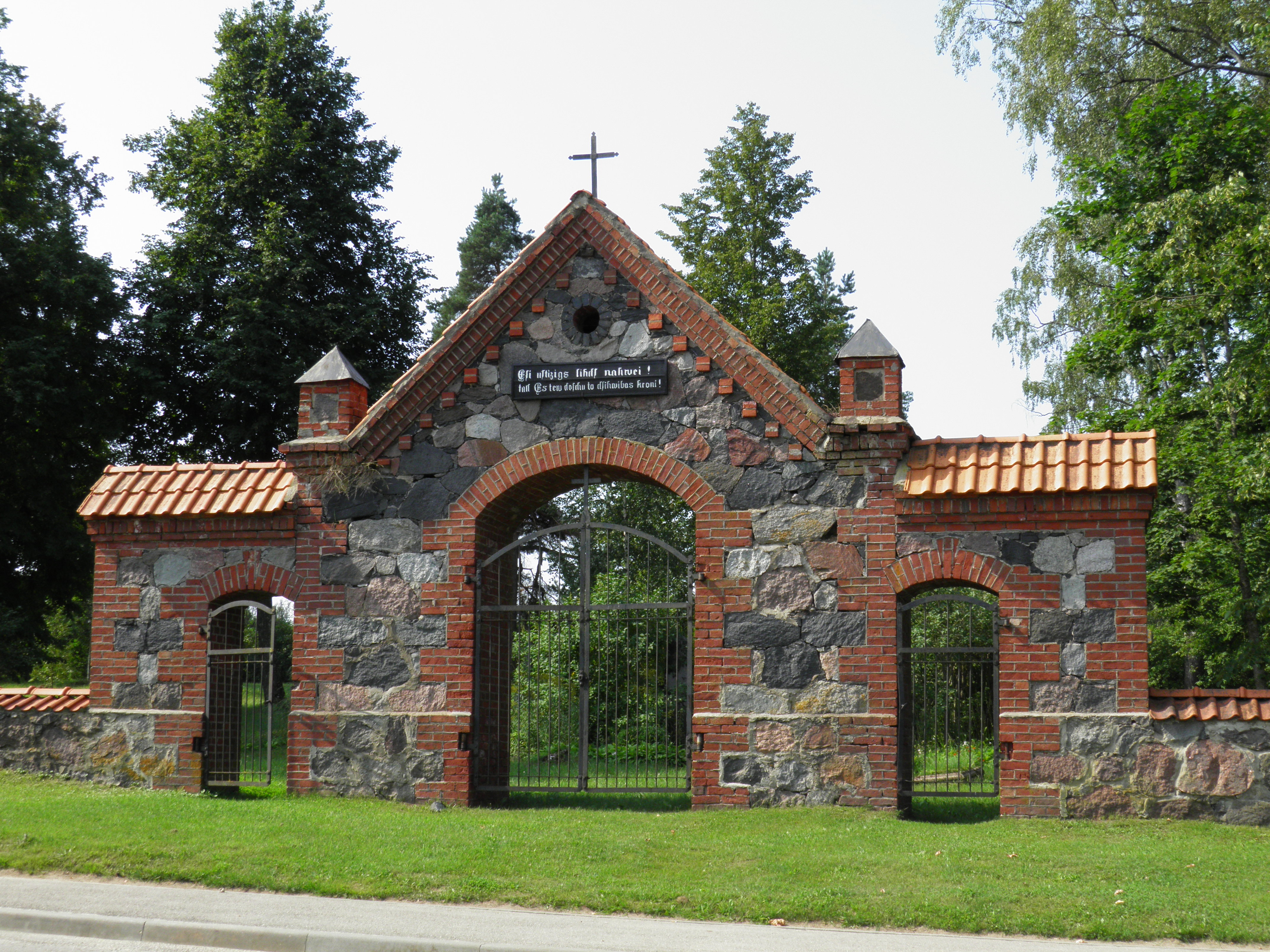
Viesīte cemetery gates

== Notable people ==
- Pauls Stradiņš (1896-1958), doctor

== See also ==
- List of cities in Latvia
