= Ābeļi Parish =

Parish in Jēkabpils Municipality, Latvia

- parish of Latvia
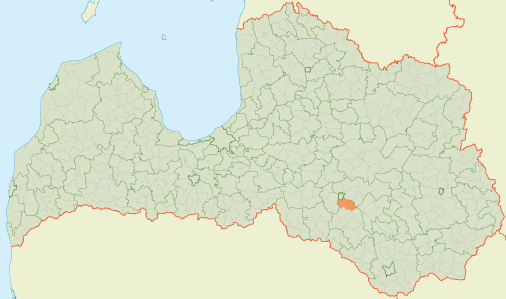
- 56°26′00″N 25°57′01″E
- Country: Latvia

Area
  - Total: 126.75 km^{2} (48.94 sq mi)
  - Land: 122.22 km^{2} (47.19 sq mi)
  - Water: 4.53 km^{2} (1.75 sq mi)

Population (1 January 2025)
  - Total: 832
  - Density: 6.6/km^{2} (17/sq mi)

Ābeļi Parish (Latvian: Ābeļu pagasts) is an administrative unit of Jēkabpils Municipality, Latvia. The administrative center of the parish is the village of Brodi.

== History ==
In the territory of present-day Ābeļi Parish, Abelhof Manor (Gut Abelhof, modern-day village of Ābeļi) and Janopole Manor ( Gut Janopol , Brodi) were there.

In the 19th century Sala Parish (Salas pagasts) was established on the left bank of the Daugava River, near Jēkabpils. In 1925 it was renamed Ābeļi Parish. In 1935 Parish occupied area of 199 km^{2} and had population of 2532 people. In 1945, Ābeļi, Ezera and Salas were united into the parish village council, but the parish was liquidated in 1949. In 1954, in Dregen village kolkhoz Soviet Homeland was created. In 1990 the village was reorganized into a parish. In 2009, Ābeļi Parish was included as an administrative territory in Jekabpils county.

== Settlements ==
The largest populated areas are Brodi (parish center), Ābeļi, Ķeikāni, Laši, Nagļi, Piļkas, Platačkalns, Rubuļkalns, Saldes, Silacaunes, Sīļukalns, Veselība. .

== Notable people ==
- Jānis Akuraters (1876-1937) — writer
- Janis Zvaigzne (1892-1954) — Latvian officer
