= Dignāja Parish =

Parish of Latvia

- parish of Latvia
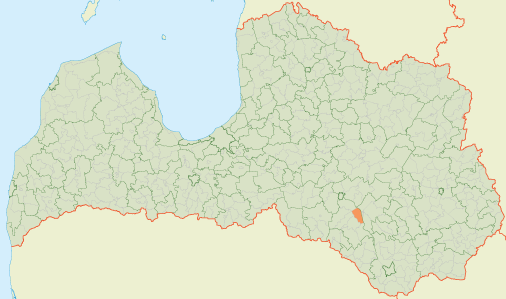
- Coordinates: 56°20′28″N 26°06′43″E
- Country: Latvia

Population (1 January 2026)
  - Total: 362

Dignāja parish (Latvian: Dignājas pagasts) is an administrative unit of Jēkabpils Municipality, Latvia.
