= Selonia =

Historical region in Latvia

Coordinates: 56°N 26°E

Selonia Sēlija
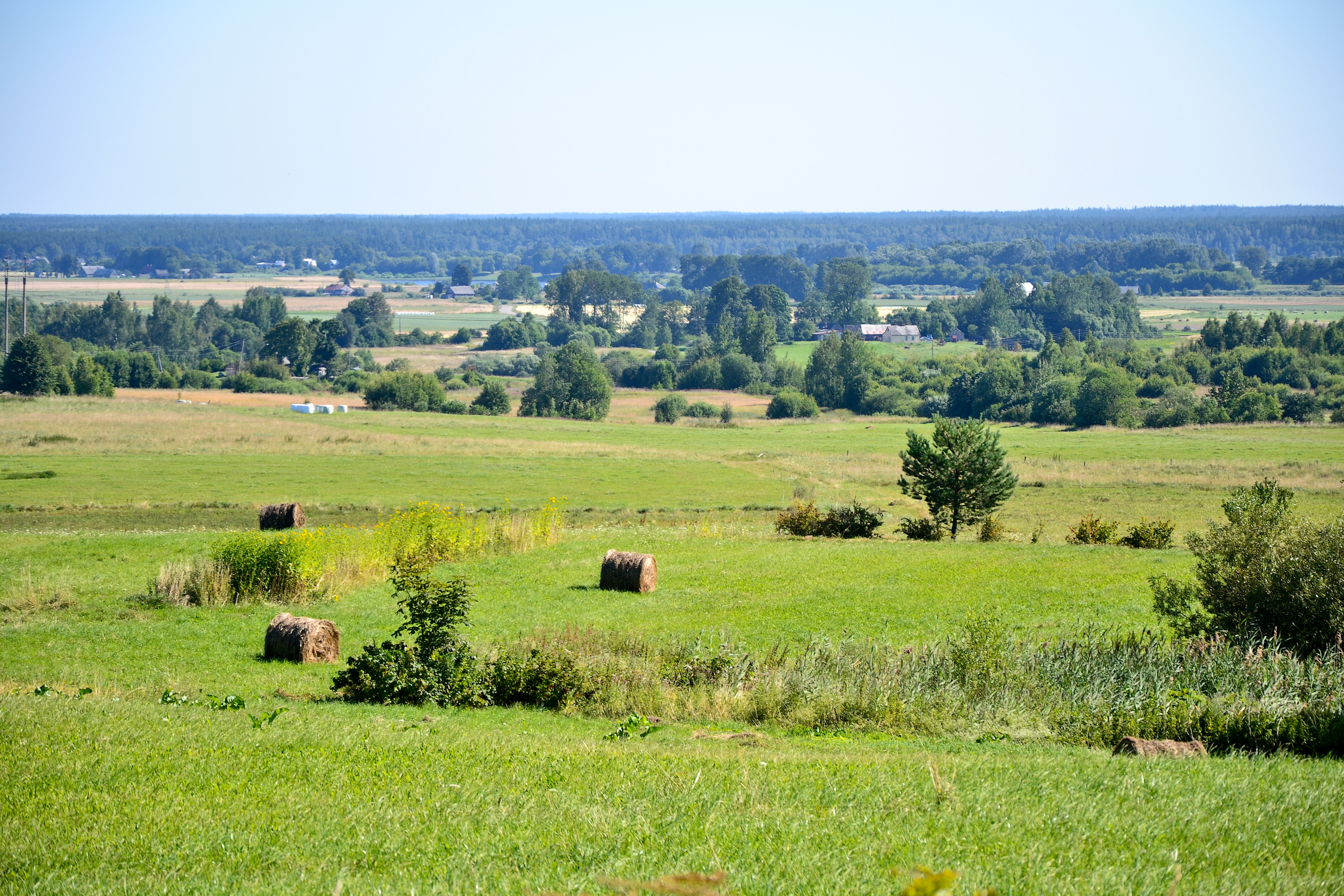
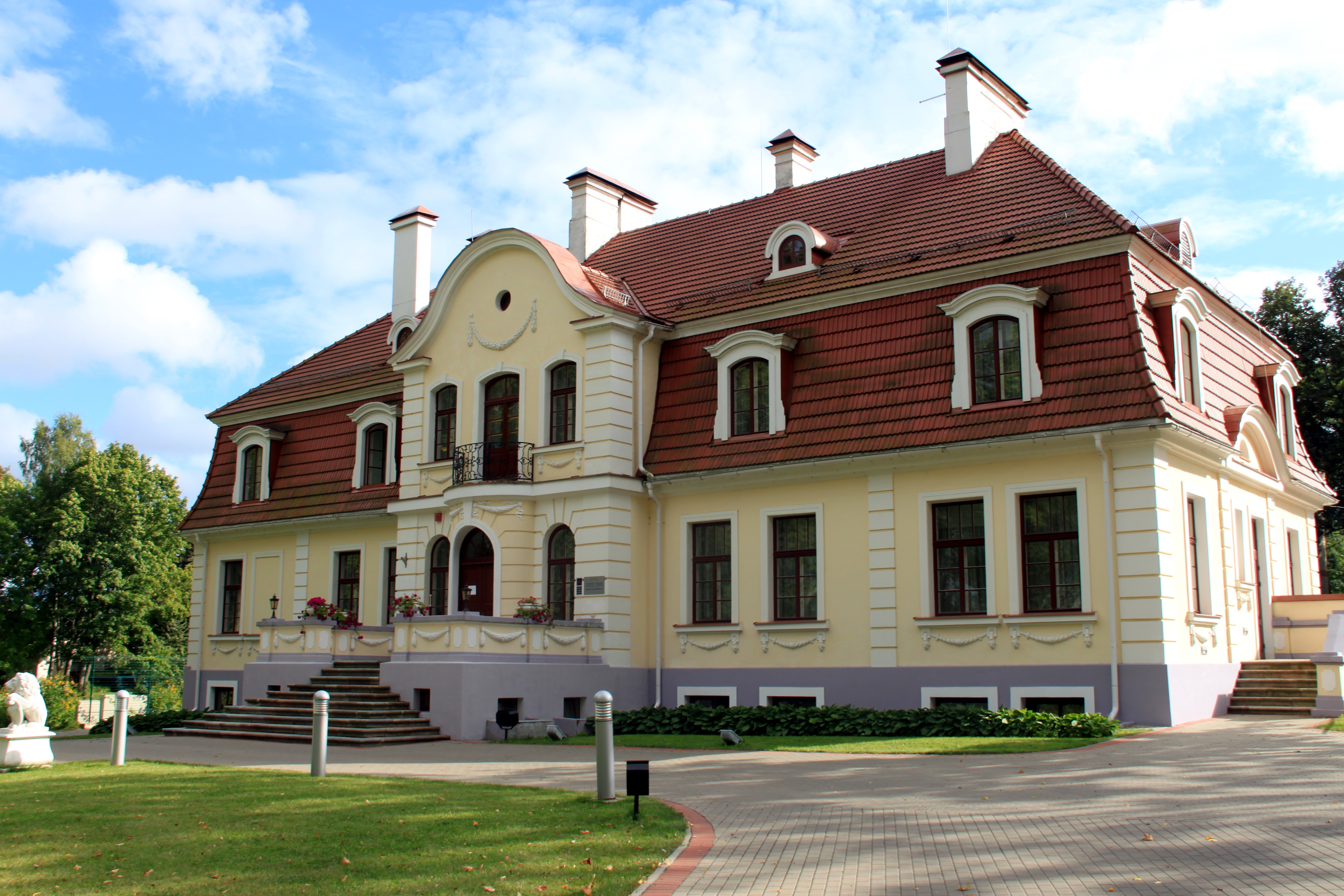
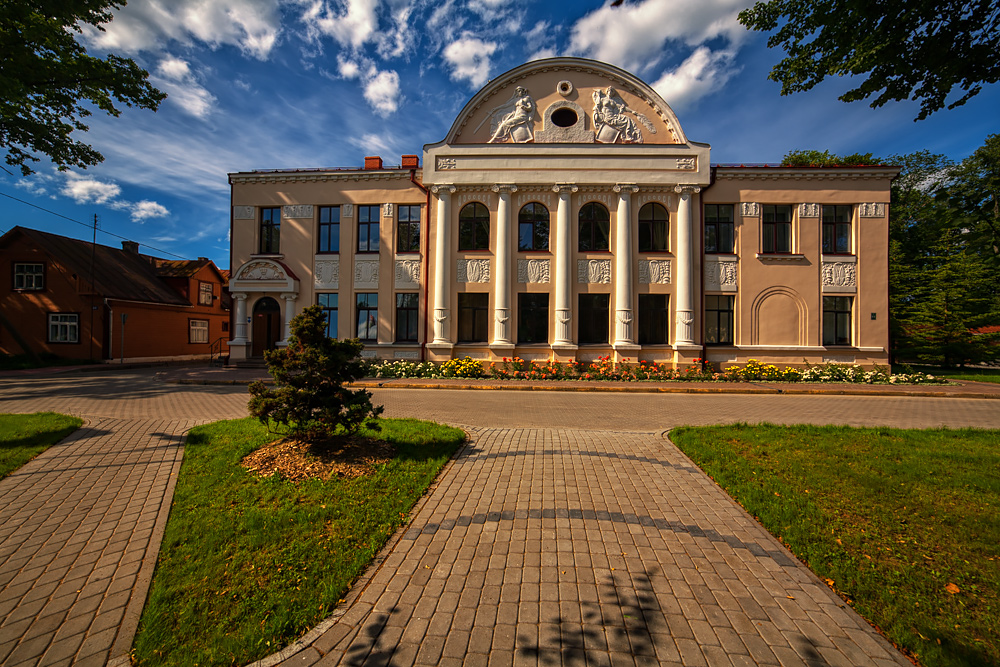
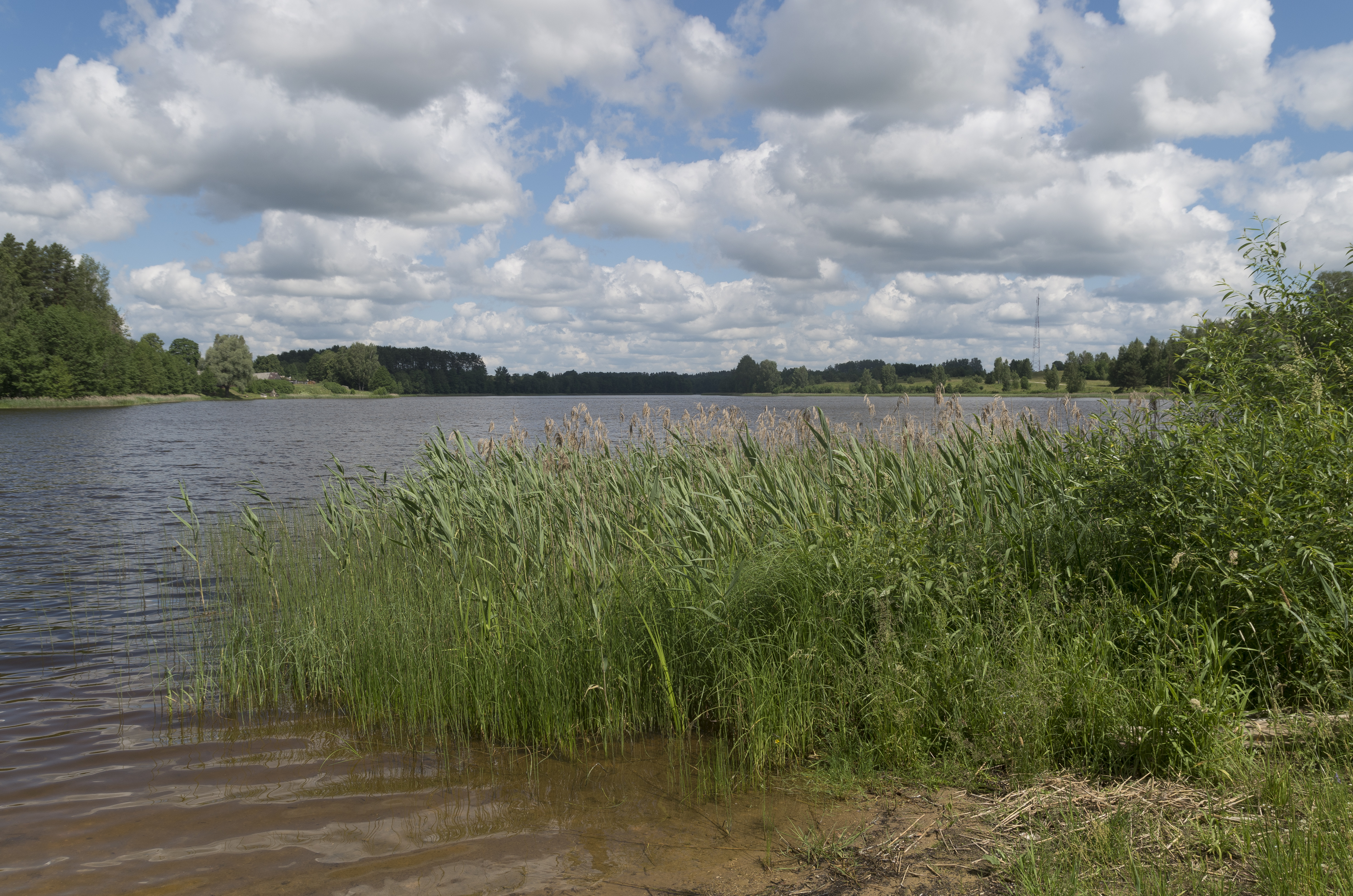
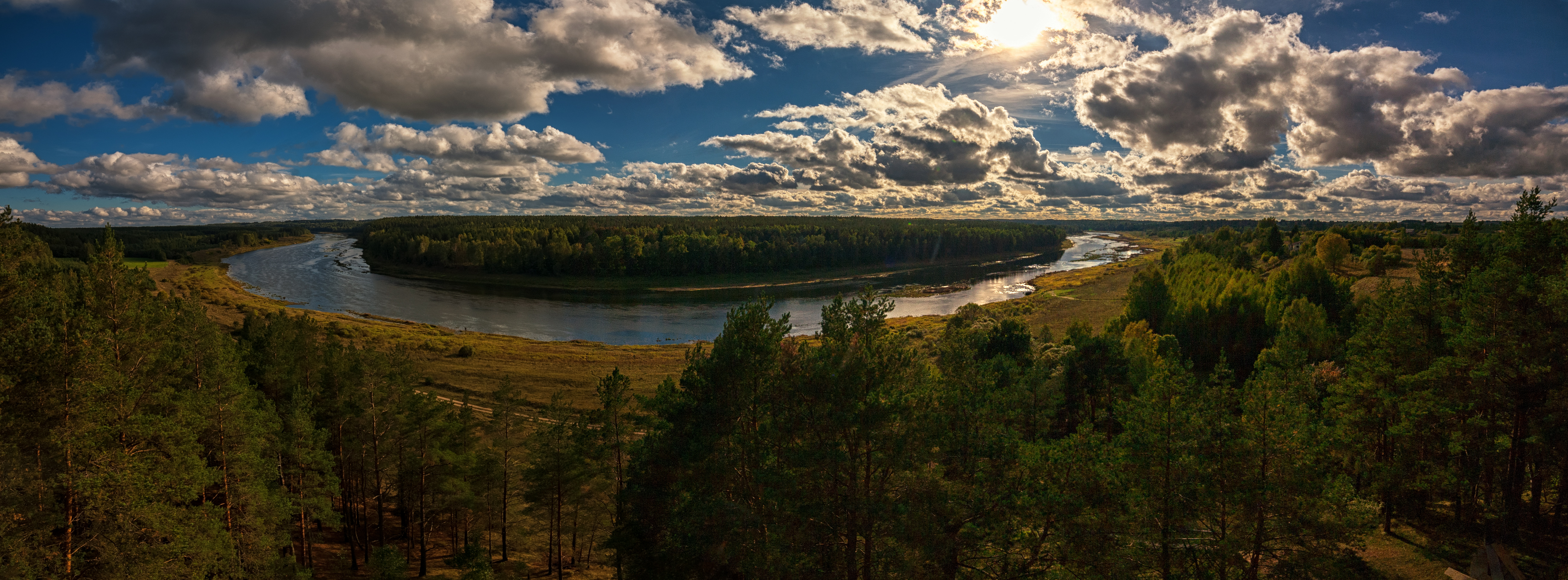
- From top, left to right: Landscape in Kalkūne Parish; Jaunsvente Manor; Jaunjelgava Town Hall; Lielais Subates Lake in Prode Parish; Daugava River in Vecsaliena Parish

- Flag Coat of arms

- Location of Selonia in Latvia.
- Country: Latvia, Lithuania
- Largest city: Jēkabpils
- Time zone: UTC+2 (EET)
  - Summer (DST): UTC+3 (EEST)

Selonia (Latvian: Sēlija; Lithuanian: Sėla), also known as Augšzeme (the "Highland"), is one of the Historical Latvian Lands as well as a portion of northeastern Lithuania. Its main city and cultural center is Jēkabpils. The Selonian language has become extinct, though some of the inhabitants still speak a Selonian subdialect.

== History ==
The territory of Selonia is defined by Latvian law as follows: Aizkraukle Municipality (the part of Aizkraukle city on the left bank of the Daugava, Daudzese Parish, Jaunjelgava Parish, Jaunjelgava city, Nereta Parish, Mazzalve Parish, Pilskalne Parish, Sece Parish, Sērene Parish, Staburags Parish, Sunākste Parish, Zalve Parish), Augšdaugava Municipality (Bebrene Parish, Demene Parish, Dviete Parish, Eglaine Parish, Ilūkste city, Kalkūne Parish, Laucesa Parish, Medumi Parish, Pilskalne Parish, Prode Parish, Saliena Parish, Skrudaliena Parish, Subate city, Svente Parish, Šēdere Parish, Tabore Parish, Vecsaliena Parish), the part of Daugavpils city on the left bank of the Daugava, Jēkabpils Municipality (Aknīste Parish, Aknīste city, Asare Parish, Ābeļi Parish, Dignāja Parish, Dunava Parish, Elkšņi Parish, Gārsene Parish, the part of Jēkabpils city on the left bank of the Daugava, Kalna Parish, Leimaņi Parish, Rite Parish, Rubene Parish, Sala Parish, Sauka Parish, Sēlpils Parish, Viesīte city, Viesīte Parish, Zasa Parish) and Krāslava Municipality (Kaplava Parish, the part of the city of Krāslava on the left bank of the Daugava).

The subjugation and baptism of the Selonians started in 1208, when Albert of Buxhoeveden captured Sēlpils hillfort (Latin: castrum Selonum). The term "Selonians" is most probably the German adaptation of the Livonian name "Highlanders", which leads to the hypothesis that the Selonians and Aukštaitians belonged to the same ethnos. The Livonian Chronicle of Henry describes the Selonians as allies of the Lithuanians. In 1218 the region formed a Selonian diocese, but in 1226 part of that diocese was joined to the Riga archbishopric and the Bishopric of Semigalia was formed. After 1561, Selonia became a part of Duchy of Courland and Semigallia.

Nowadays the region is mainly inhabited by Latvians with large ethnic minorities of Russians, Poles, Belarusians and Lithuanians in the southeastern municipality of Augšdaugava Municipality.

=== Historic boundaries ===
Among historical documents, the Mindaugas's Donation Act of 1261 is the one that best describes the transfer of the Selonian lands to the Knights of the Sword. Their boundary went from the Daugava at Naujene, near Daugavpils castle, running along Kopkelis to Luodis lake and northwards along the Duseta river to lake Sartai and towards the source of the Šventoji. It stretched further to the Latuva, Vašuoka and Viešinta rivers, along the Lėvuo river northwards to the Mūša (Mūsa) and downstream, to the mouth of the Babīte (Būga, 1961, p. 273–274).

Thus, the historical sources describing the Selonian boundaries in the second half of the 13th century are rather precise. The linguist Kazimieras Būga, basing himself on linguistic data alone, specifies the southern boundary of the Selonian territory as running approximately by the towns of Salakas, Tauragnai, Utena, Svėdasai, Subačius, Palėvenė, Pasvalys, and Saločiai. Regional history museum of the Selonia region of Lithuania, founded in 1928 in Biržai Castle.

== Sources ==
- Arveds Švābe, ed.: Latvju enciklopēdija. Stockholm: Trīs Zvaigznes, 1952-1953.
- Edgars Andersons, ed.: Latvju enciklopēdija 1962-1982. Lincoln: American Latvian Association , 1983-1990. Entry "Sēlija" available at historia.lv. Retrieved 25. II. 2006.
- Vytautas Kazakevičius: "Selonian archaeological sites in Lithuania" Retrieved 25. II. 2006.
