= Jēkabpils Municipality =

Municipality of Latvia

Coordinates: 56°29′44″N 25°52′07″E

Jēkabpils Municipality Jēkabpils novads
- Municipality
- Flag Coat of arms

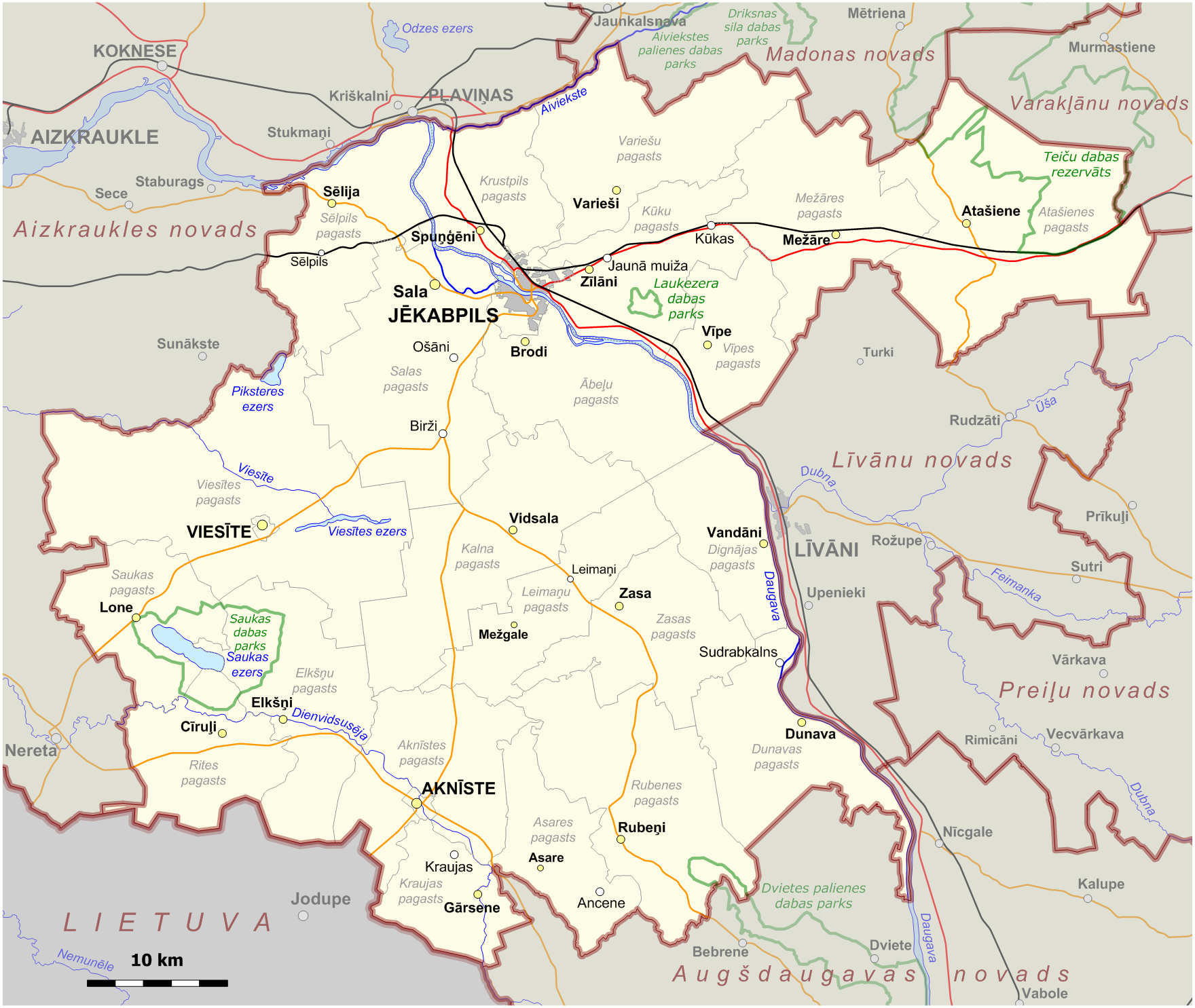
- Country: Latvia
- Formed: 2009
- Reformed: 2021
- Centre: Jēkabpils

Government
  - Council Chair: Raivis Ragainis (LZP)

Area
  - Total: 2,996.11 km^{2} (1,156.80 sq mi)
  - Land: 2,904.31 km^{2} (1,121.36 sq mi)
  - Water: 91.80 km^{2} (35.44 sq mi)

Population (2026)
  - Total: 38,134
  - Density: 13.130/km^{2} (34.007/sq mi)
- Website: www.jekabpils.lv/en

Jēkabpils Municipality (Latvian: Jēkabpils novads) is a municipality in Latvia. The municipality was formed in 2009 by merging Ābeļi Parish, Dignāja Parish, Dunava Parish, Kalna Parish, Leimaņi Parish, Rubene Parish and Zasa Parish. During the 2021 Latvian administrative reform, the previous Jēkabpils Municipality was merged with Aknīste Municipality, Krustpils Municipality, Sala Municipality and Viesīte Municipality. The new municipality now fully corresponds with the area of the pre-2009 Jēkabpils district.

The administrative centre of the municipality is the city of Jēkabpils. From 2009 to 2021, the city was also a separate first-level municipality (republican city) at the same time.

In 2020, the population of the municipality was 4,156. In 2024, the total population was 39,276. It borders Lithuania.

== Symbols (2009–2021) ==
The coat of arms and the flag used until the 2021 Latvian administrative reform were abolished after the changes in the boundaries of the municipality, with new sketches being unveiled in August 2022. The sketches will need to be approved by the Heraldry Commission of Latvia before use.

The previous symbols were a reference to the coat of arms of Jēkabpils district, although the color field was changed to one similar to the flag of Selonia, in which a large part of the municipality was and is located in.

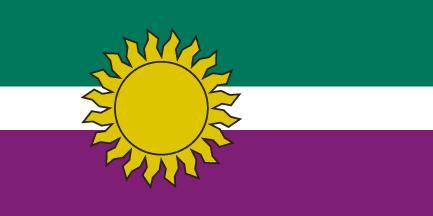
Previous flag

Previous coat of arms

== Notable people ==
- Jānis Pliekšāns (1865 in Dunava Parish – 1929), pseudonym Rainis, a poet, playwright, translator and politician.
- Pauls Dauge (1869 in Sauka Parish – 1946), a Latvian dentist, Bolshevik revolutionary activist, writer and publicist.
- Jānis Akuraters (1876 in Dignāja Parish – 1937), poet, writer, playwright and politician. He founded the Latvian National Theatre
- Aleksandrs Grīns (1895 in Kalna Parish – 1941), a writer of historical novels, translator and an army officer.
- Pauls Stradiņš (1896 in Viesīte – 1958), professor, physician, and surgeon, who founded the Museum of the History of Medicine
- Gundars Bērziņš (1959 in Variešu parish – 2023), accountant and politician, Minister of Finance, 2000 to 2002
- Ivans Klementjevs (born 1960 in Burtiki), politician and former sprint canoeist, gold medallist at the 1988 Summer Olympics,
- Jefimijs Klementjevs (born 1963), sprint canoer who competed in two Summer Olympics

== See also ==
- Administrative divisions of Latvia (2009)
