= List of windmills =

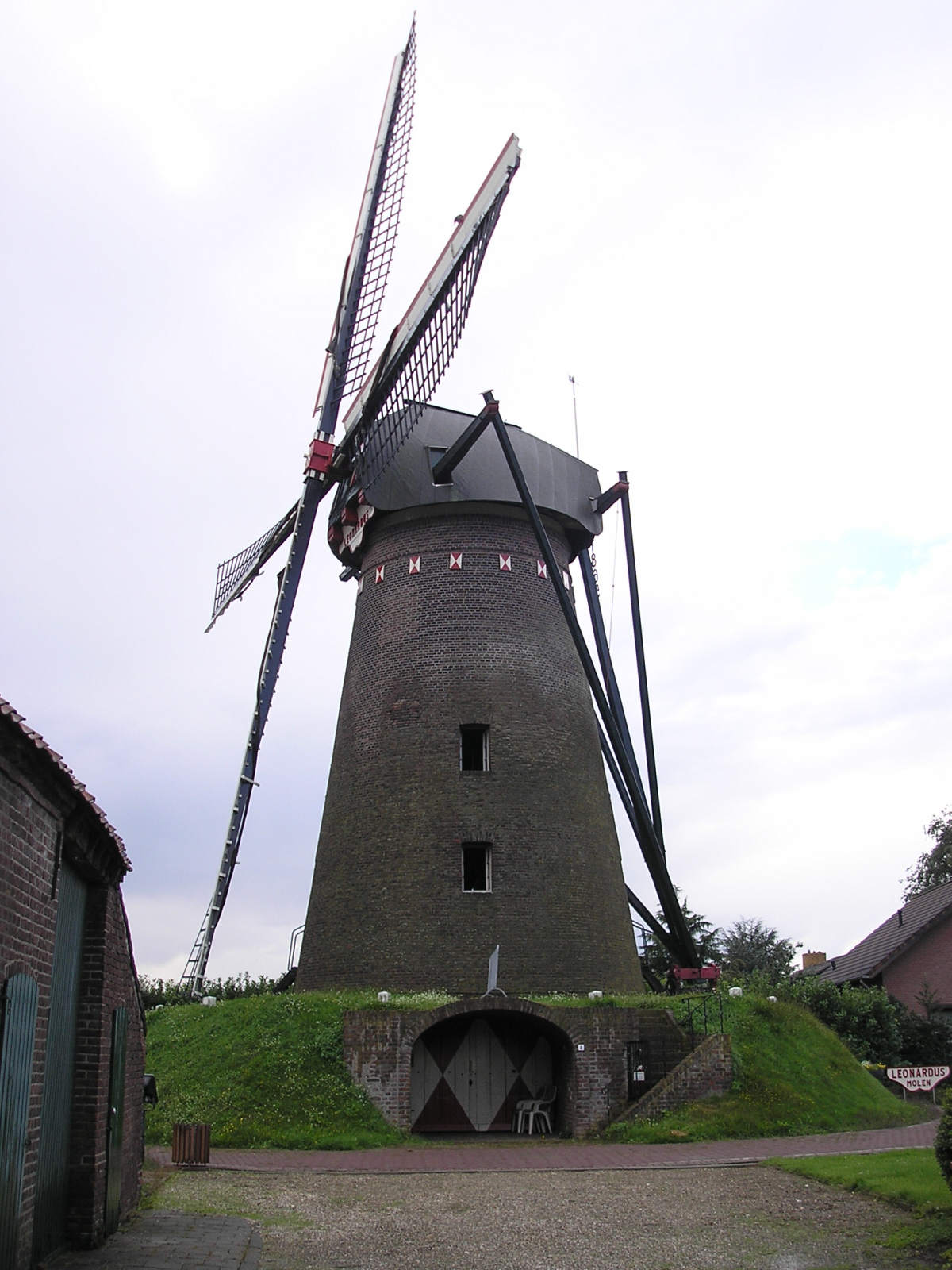
Leonardusmolen, in Limburg area, Netherlands

The List of windmills is a link page for any windmill or windpump.

== Africa ==
=== South Africa ===
- See List of windmills in South Africa

== Asia ==
=== China ===
Location	Name of mill and coordinates	Type	Built	Notes	Photograph
Dalian		Smock			
Hebei		Vertical axis pumping mill			
Hebei	Saihanba National Forest Park (two mills)	Smock			
Hong Kong	Admiralty	Smock			
Huyi	Meibei Lake (two mills)	Smock			
Kunming		Post			
Lanzhou		Smock			
Longgang		Tower			
Nanjing	Lavender Garden	Smock			
Nanjing	Botanical Garden	Smock			
Pulandian					
Qionghai		Smock			
Shuangliu		Smock			
Taoyuan		Tower			

=== Indonesia ===
The Dutch colonists in Batavia built at least four wind-powered sawmills around the Bay of Batavia, many years after founding Batavia (now Jakarta) in 1619, but these were not entirely successful. People and animals (water buffalo) powered mills also and previously (introduced by the Chinese). Out of about 25 Dutch-designed mills in the area, their water-powered mills were the most successful. Specifically, around 1675 a first wind-powered sawmill was built on the island of De Kuyper (now Pulu Burung) to support the Onrust Island (Pulu Kapal) dockyard that repaired Dutch East India Company ships. By 1685 there were two built in Onrust and around 1705 another was built on the island of Edam (Pulu Damar.

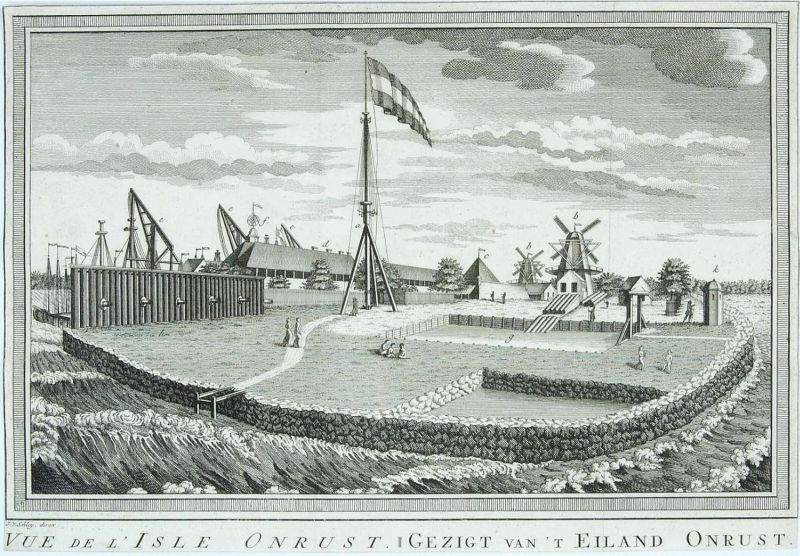
Engraving of Onrust (c.1765)

All four were destroyed by British bombardment on 9 November 1800. Under Napoleon, the Dutch nation which was named the Batavian Republic from 17xx to 18xx) had become part of the French empire, and Batavia in the East Indies was included. The bombardment was near the end of the War of the Second Coalition that pitted Britain and almost all of Europe against the French First Republic. This must have been part of the East Indies theatre of the French Revolutionary Wars.

=== Israel ===
- See List of windmills in Israel

=== Japan ===
Location	Name of mill and coordinates	Type	Built	Notes	Photograph
Kamiyūbetsu		Smock			
Kita		Smock			
Maebashi, Gunma	Michinoeki Green Flower Stock Farm	Smock			
Sakura	De Liefde	Tower	1994		
Shodoshima		Tower		The windmill is presented to Shōdo Island from Milos, Greece.	
Tome	Location: 38°41′23.3″N 141°08′11.3″W	Tower			

=== Syria ===
Location	Name of mill and coordinates	Type	Built	Notes	Photograph
Homs	Krak des Chevaliers	Tower		One of the towers had a windmill (far right in picture).	
Quneitra		Trestle		Pumping mill (Photo)	
Tartus		Smock		Photo dated 2007	

=== Taiwan ===
Location	Name of mill and coordinates	Type	Built	Notes	Photograph
Dongshih		Tower			

=== Thailand ===
Location	Name of mill and coordinates	Type	Built	Notes	Photograph
Chiangmai		Hollow post			

== Oceania ==
=== Australia ===
- See List of windmills in Australia

=== New Zealand ===
Location	Name of mill and coordinates	Type	Built	Notes	Photograph
Auckland	Partington's Mill	Tower			
Foxton	De Molen	Smock	2003	De Molen	
Nelson	Founders Heritage Park	Smock			

== Europe ==
=== Austria ===
Location	Name of mill and coordinates	Type	Built	Notes	Photograph
Bad Traunstein		Post			
Markgrafneusiedl		Tower			
Podersdorf am See		Tower			
Retz		Tower			
Retz	(second mill)	Tower			
Riegersburg		Tower			

=== Belarus ===
- See List of windmills in Belarus

=== Belgium ===
- See List of windmills in Belgium

=== Bulgaria ===
Location	Name of mill and coordinates	Type	Built	Notes	Photograph
Belintsi	43.654514°N 26.954275°E		early 20th century		
Belodgradchik	Belodgradchik Fortress	Post			
Nesebar		Post			
Nesebar		Tower			
Nesebar		Tower			
Pravda		Post			
Rila		Post			
Sozopol		Post			
Sozopol		Post			

=== Croatia ===
Location	Name of mill and coordinates	Type	Built	Notes	Photograph
Bol		Tower			
Medulin		Tower			
Stari Grad		Tower			

=== Czech Republic ===
- See List of windmills in the Czech Republic

=== Denmark ===
- See List of windmills in Denmark

=== Estonia ===
- See List of windmills in Estonia

=== Finland ===
Location	Name of mill and coordinates	Type	Built	Notes	Photograph
Åland		Post			
Åland Islands		Post			
Finström, Åland Islands		Post			
Hartola		Post			
Järvenpää		Post			
Konnevesi	Konnevesi Museum	Post			
Korpoström, Korpo	Hembygdsmuseum	Post			
Kotka		Post			
Liminka		Post			
Loviisa		Smock			
Luopajarvi		Post			
Oulu	Turkansaari Open Air Museum; 64°56′51″N 25°42′25″E	Post			
Pälkäne	61°20′15″N 24°16′17″E	Smock			
Pudasjärvi		Post			
Samppalinna, Turku		Tower	1860		
Sagalund		Post			
Seurasaari	Seurasaari Open Air Museum	Post			
Sideby		Post			
Tornio		Post			
Tyrnävä		Post			
Uusikaupunki		Post			
Uusikaupunki		Post			
Uusikaupunki		Smock			
Vaala		Post			
Östra Simskäla, Vårdö, Åland		Post			

=== France ===
- See List of windmills in France

=== Germany ===
- See List of windmills in Germany

=== Greece ===
- See List of windmills in Greece

=== Hungary ===
Location	Name of mill and coordinates	Type	Built	Notes	Photograph
Debrecen	Hortobágy Windmill	Tower			
Dusnok	Szentendrei Néprajzi Múzeum	Tower			
Jánoshalma		Tower			
Kengyel		Tower			
Kiskunfélegyháza		Tower			
Kiskunhalas		Tower			
Ópusztaszer		Tower	Late 19th century		
Sopron		Tower			
Sopron		Tower			
Szegvár		Tower			
Szeged	Kiskundorozsma Windmill	Tower			
Tataháza		Tower			
Tés		Tower			

=== Ireland ===
- See List of windmills in Ireland

=== Italy ===
Location	Name of mill and coordinates	Type	Built	Notes	Photograph
Bibbona		Tower			
Laguna di Orbetello	Molino Spagnolo	Tower			
Margherita di Savoia		Titt wind engine			
Marsala	(two mills)	Tower		Pumping mills for salt works	
Mozia		Tower		Former pumping mill for salt works, now a salt museum	
Trapani		Tower			
Valle Benedetta	43°31′24″N 10°25′00″E	Tower			

=== Latvia ===
Location	Name of mill and coordinates	Type	Built	Notes	Photograph
Asare		Tower			
Cēsis	Āraišu Windmill	Tower			
Cēsis	Cēsis Windmill 57°18′56″N 25°16′54″E	Tower			
Elkšņi		Tower			
Ķīru	56°31′55″N 24°32′11″E	Smock			
Nīca	56°22′45″N 20°29′12″E	Smock			
Otaņķi	Rudes Windmill; 56°23′18″N 21°05′46″E	Tower			
Piltene	57°13′46″N 21°40′00″E	Smock		Base remains.	
Riga	The Ethnographic Open-Air Museum of Latvia	Smock			
Riga	The Ethnographic Open-Air Museum of Latvia	Smock			
Riga	The Ethnographic Open-Air Museum of Latvia	Post			
Riga	The Ethnographic Open-Air Museum of Latvia	Post			
Ruba		Tower			
Sēļi		Smock			
Valdgale	57°17′11″N 22°34′16″E	Tower			

=== Lithuania ===
Location	Name of mill and coordinates	Type	Built	Notes	Photograph
Aleknaičiai		Tower			
Alksniupiai	55°46′16″N 23°46′36″E	Smock			
Baltoji		Tower			
Darbėnai		Smock			
Diržiai	56°13′14″N 24°00′20″E	Smock			
Katinai	55°35′01″N 24°24′22″E	Tower			
Kleboniškiai	55°46′12″N 23°50′58″E	Smock			
Lazdininkai	56°00′24″N 21°13′00″E	Smock			
Meldinai	55°51′17″N 23°52′55″E	Smock			
Obeliai		Tower			
Paežeriai	55°48′49″N 23°41′39″E	Smock			
Paluobiai	54°52′30″N 23°14′28″E	Smock			
Purpliai		Smock			
Rumšiškės	Rumšiškės Open Air Museum	Smock Tower		Moved from Samogitia	
Šeduva		Tower			
Šiauliai	55°55′24″N 23°19′19″E	Smock	1875–1880		
Šeduva	Devil's Mill	Tower			
Sodeliškiai	55°37′51″N 24°26′04″E	Tower			
Sovaičiai		Smock			
Stačiūnai		Smock			
Stultiškiai		Smock			
Telšiai		Smock			
Traupis	55°30′45″N 24°44′14″E	Tower			
Vaiguviskiai		Smock			
Vaškai		Tower	1898		

=== Malta ===
- See List of windmills in Malta

=== Netherlands ===
- See List of windmills in the Netherlands

Virtually every small town and polder in the Netherlands has one or more windmills. The Zaanstreek alone has had over a thousand industrial windmills, each with a name and well-documented history (see list of windmills at Zaanse Schans). Other well-known windmills are the windmills at Kinderdijk.

=== Poland ===
- See List of windmills in Poland

=== Portugal ===
- See List of windmills in Portugal

=== Romania ===
Location	Name of mill and coordinates	Type	Built	Notes	Photograph
Bucharest	Village Museum	Post			
Bucharest	Museum of the Romanian Peasant	Post			
Letea		Post			
Sibiu	Muzeul Tehnicii Popular de la Sibiu	Post			
Unknown location		Post			

=== Russia ===
Location	Name of mill and coordinates	Type	Built	Notes	Photograph
Barinovka		Smock			
Cheboksarsky District		Smock			
Istra	New Jerusalem Monastery Mill	Smock			
Kizhi		Post			
Kizhi		Post			
Kozmodemyansk	Mari Ethnographic Museum	Post			
Kupino	'Kupino Traditional Culture Centre	Post			
Kursk Oblast		Post and Smock		Four mills	
Ludorvay	Ludorvay Architectural and Ethnographic Open-air Museum; 56°45′42″N 53°03′14″E	Smock			
Malye Korely		Post			
Malye Korely		Post			
Malye Korely		Smock			
Myshkin		Smock			
Perm Krai	Khokhlovka Architectural and Ethnological Museum	Smock			
Cheboksarsky District		Smock		Two mills	
Suzdal	Museum of Wooden Architecture and Peasant Life	Smock			
Suzdal	Museum of Wooden Architecture and Peasant Life (2nd mill)	Smock		Rear in photo	
Tarkhany		Smock			
Tobolsk	(four mills)	Post			
Tserkovshchina		Post		Standing in 1919	
Velikiy Novgorod		Smock			
Volgograd		Post			
Volgograd		Smock		Four mills standing in 1917	
Vitoslavicy	58°31′21″N 31°16′13″E	Smock			
Yakovlevsky District, Belgorod Oblast		Post			

=== Slovakia ===
Location	Name of mill and coordinates	Type	Built	Notes	Photograph
Korňa				Photo	
Holíč	Holíč windmill	Tower	1880s		

=== Spain ===
- See List of windmills in Spain

=== Sweden ===
- See List of windmills in Sweden

=== Turkey ===
Location	Name of mill and coordinates	Type	Built	Notes	Photograph
Ayvalık		Tower		House converted	
Bodrum		Tower		Several mills	
Datça	(four mills)	Tower			

=== Ukraine ===
Location	Name of mill and coordinates	Type	Built	Notes	Photograph
Pyrohiv	Museum of Ukrainian Folk Architecture and Ethnography (three mills)	Smock			
Pyrohiv	Museum of Ukrainian Folk Architecture and Ethnography (five mills)	Post			
Prelesne		Post			

=== United Kingdom ===
- See List of windmills in the United Kingdom

==== Channel Islands ====
- See Windmills in Guernsey and Windmills in Jersey

==== Isle of Man ====
- See Windmills in the Isle of Man

== North America ==
=== Antigua ===
Location	Name of mill and coordinates	Type	Built	Notes	Photograph
Betty's Hope	Betty's Hope Mills (two mills)	Tower			

=== Barbados ===
Location	Name of mill and coordinates	Type	Built	Notes	Photograph
Bridgetown		Tower			
St Andrew	Morgan Lewis Mill	Tower		Website	
St Andrew		Tower			
St Andrew		Tower			
St Andrew		Tower			
St Lucy		Tower			
St Peter		Tower			
St Peter		Tower			
St Philip		Tower			

=== Canada ===
- See List of windmills in Canada

=== Guadeloupe ===
Location	Name of mill and coordinates	Type	Built	Notes	Photograph
Capesterre-de-Marie-Galante	Moulin Bezard	Tower			
Le Moule	Moulin du Distrillerier Damoiseau	Tower			
Marie-Galante		Tower			

=== Saint Kitts and Nevis ===
Location	Name of mill and coordinates	Type	Built	Notes	Photograph
Saint John Figtree Parish, Nevis	Montpelier Plantation Mill	Tower mill			

=== United States ===
- See List of windmills in the United States

In the United States, there are some traditional windmills, but the American usage of the word "windmill" includes some that are actually windpumps.

== South America ==
=== Argentina ===
Location	Name of mill and coordinates	Type	Built	Notes	Photograph
Colón	Molino Forclaz	Tower mill	1859		
Junín		Tower mill			
Tandil		Tower mill			

=== Brazil ===
Location	Name of mill and coordinates	Type	Built	Notes	Photograph
Arapoti		Smock			
Brasília	(Two mills)	Smock			
Carambei		Smock			
Castrolanda	De Immigrant; Moinho Castrolando	Smock			
Holambra	Moinho Povos Unidos	Smock			
Joinville	Moinho da XV	Smock			
Porto Alegre		Tower			
Uberlândia		Smock			

=== Uruguay ===
Location	Name of mill and coordinates	Type	Built	Notes	Photograph
Colonia del Sacramento	El Torreón; 34°28′13″S 57°51′11″W	Tower		Converted to restaurant. Windmill World	
Minas	Molino Viejo; 34°22′39″S 55°14′38″W	Tower		Windmill World	
Montevideo	Mirador Rosario; 34°51′12″S 56°08′24″W	Tower		Destroyed in a storm in 1977. Windmill World	
Solymar	Museo del Pan; 34°22′50″S 55°57′14″W	Smock		Windmill World	
Unión, Montevideo	Del Galgo; 34°52′24″S 56°07′59″W	Tower	1900	Three mills in 1900, of which one survives as of 2011. Windmill World	

== See also ==
- Windpump
- Watermill
- Horse mill
- Moulin Rouge
