= Upper Courland Partisan Regiment =

The Upper Courland Partisan Regiment (Latvian: Augškurzemes partizānu pulks) was a partisan unit during the Latvian War of Independence, which fought against the Bolsheviks in Selonia (also known as Upper Courland) from June 13 to August 16, 1919, under the leadership of Jānis Indāns.

Until mid-July 1919, the partisan regiment, under the leadership of the Ilūkste county War Commandant Indāns, operated under the military command and support of the Lithuanian Army, participating in its attack in the direction of Bebrene and Dviete.

The regiment's headquarters was located in the Asare Manor, the regiment had about 600 men, it was armed with rifle weapons, including 6 support machine guns and 8 hand machine guns.

== Formation ==
The Upper Kurzeme Partisan Regiment was formed in June 1919 at Rubene Manor, uniting several smaller groups that operated in the western part of Ilūkste county during the Latvian SSR rule in May. Separate partisan groups operated in the Kaldabruņa–Bebrene and Dviete areas, in the Rubeņu–Podumaja district, and a smaller group near Ilze–Akmeņupe–Eglaine. On June 22, the regiment headquarters at Asare Manor issued Commander Indāns' Order No. 1, which indicated that the regiment consisted of 161 soldiers.

On June 23, the regiment commander J. Indāns issued a proclamation to all residents that the Upper Courland Partisan Regiment was the only legitimate authority in the region and promised to fight for an independent Republic of Latvia, recognizing the Latvian Provisional Government in Liepāja led by Kārlis Ulmanis as its legitimate government.

== Participation in battles ==
On June 8, the partisans attacked the house in Gārsene parish, and on June 10, they drove the Red Army from the Bebrene Manor. On June 13, the commander of the Panevėžys Group of the Lithuanian Army (after the Kupiškis–Utena offensive) issued an order to allow Lieutenant Colonel J. Indāns to form a group of troops from the armed partisans in the forests of Upper Courland (Selonia) and to accept this unit of troops under the operational command and support of the Lithuanian Army for a joint fight against the Bolsheviks in the Lithuanian–Soviet War. On June 19, permission to establish the regiment was also given by the Commander-in-Chief of the Lithuanian Army, General Silvestras Žukauskas.

From July 6 to 11, 1919, the regiment participated in the battles of the Lithuanian Army against the Bolsheviks near Bebrene, which it captured on July 10. After that, the regiment took up defense on the Ancene–Rubene line and along the left bank of the Daugava. After the establishment of the Latvian Army in mid-July, the regiment's leadership established contacts with the 4th Valmiera Infantry Regiment, which was stationed near Līvāni.

On August 9, the commander of the Courland Division of the Latvian Army, Colonel Jānis Balodis, issued an order by which the Upper Courland Partisan Regiment was included in one of the then-unnamed infantry regiments of the division. On August 16, the Upper Courland Partisan Regiment was reorganized into the 3rd Battalion of the 3rd Jelgava Infantry Regiment, which participated in the liberation of Līvāni. In early 1920, the battalion participated in the battle of Daugavpils and the Liberation of Rēzekne.

== The Fallen ==
The regiment's memorial plaque, erected in 1934, lists the names of 39 fallen soldiers of the Upper Courland Partisan Regiment: Lieutenant Alberts Mežaraups, Sergeant Alberts Grīslītis, Private Jānis Mickevičs, Privates Antons Baltmanis, Stanislavs Balulis, Jānis Bartuševics, Rūdolfs Buķis, Otto Caune, Jāzeps Daģis, Antons Dilāns, Ādolfs Drozdovskis, Jānis Eibaums, Jānis Gailis, Ernests Geidāns, Otto Geidāns, Pēteris Grigalis, Jānis Jurkevičs, Vincents Kantāns, Jānis Ķiķēns, Jānis Kliģis, Teodors Leimanis, Pēteris Melderis, Pēteris Petrovskis, Stanislavs Pupiņš, Antons Rasimens, Antons Sauskājs, Jānis Senis, Juris (Jozis) Skrejāns, Antons Stočka, Aleksandrs Strazds, Jānis Ūdris, Juris Ūdris, Peter Vanadziņš, Nikodems Vanags, Stanislavs Vilcāns, Stanislavs Voiceks, Antons Vuškāns, Antons Žuravskis, Jāzeps Zviedrāns.

== Memorial ==
The initiative of the head of the aviation school, Captain Jānis Indāns, began to raise funds for the construction of the monument to the Upper Courland Partisan Regiment in Asare. On the 5th anniversary of the regiment's founding, on June 22, 1924, the foundation stone of the monument was laid and consecrated. On August 17, 1924, the monument, built after the design of Aleksandrs Birzenieks, was solemnly opened by the President of Latvia, Jānis Čakste. It has a circular foundation made of boulders, on top of which is an earth embankment, in the center of which is a granite block with an iron cross. Along the slope of the embankment, 7 boulders are placed all around, which were brought from the surrounding parishes, from which the soldiers of the regiment came: Prode, Gārsene, Aknīste, Susēja, Rubene, Bebrene and Dviete. A square stone is placed in front of the monument, which served to light the eternal flame. The cross was forged by the blacksmith Aleksandrs Puķēns from Asare, and the monument was erected by the mason Drazdovskis from Subate. 8 linden trees grow around the monument as a testament to the unity of the partisans of all parishes (including Asare).

On June 22, 1929, the soldiers of the Lithuanian army erected their memorial cross with the sign of the Columns of Gediminas and the inscription in Lithuanian "Lithuanian soldiers fallen for Lithuania and Latvia in 1919".

On June 22, 1934, Deputy Prime Minister Marģers Skujenieks unveiled a plaque on the back of the central memorial stone with the names of 39 partisans who fell in the Latvian freedom struggle.

The Bebrene Freedom Struggle Monument was unveiled in 1932. It was also built according to the project of architect A. Birzenieks. After the Soviet re-occupation of Latvia in 1944, the monument was demolished and a monument to the soldiers of the Red Army was erected in its place. After Latvia regained its independence, the renovated monument was unveiled on May 15, 1994.

In 1932, a plaque was unveiled at the Aknīste Primary School to the heroes who fell in the freedom struggle. When the construction of the new school building was completed in the autumn of 1939, the plaque was moved to it. After the Soviet occupation of Latvia in 1940, the plaque disappeared.

On September 29, 1934, a plaque was unveiled at the Rubeņi Catholic Church to the fallen soldiers of the parish, which has also disappeared. In turn, in the sacristy of the Asare Lutheran church, there is a plaque “To the Brothers of the Partisans, the Guards and the Singing Society of the Slate Parish”, which is placed on the church during holidays.

On August 13, 1939, opposite the Gārsene parish hall, it was planned to present to the public the memorial sign of the liberation of Augšzeme (Selonia), cast in Latvian granite by A. Blumbergs in Jēkabpils after the architect A. Birzeniekas, but on August 12, an announcement was published in the press that the opening ceremony of the sign had been postponed indefinitely.

Only on February 25, 1995, on the 100th birthday of General J. Indāns, a memorial plaque was unveiled on the wall of the former Gārsene parish building to the Green Partisans of Augškurzeme and the founder and commander of the regiment, Jānis Indāns.

== Literature ==
- Labsvīrs, ed. (1929). 3. Jelgavas kājnieku pulks, 1919.16.VIII–1929.16.VIII (in Latvian). Jelgava.
- Ciganovs, Juris (27 May 2015). "Augškurzemes partizānu pulks". Sargs.lv (in Latvian).
