= Vilkupe =

Village in Latvia

- Village
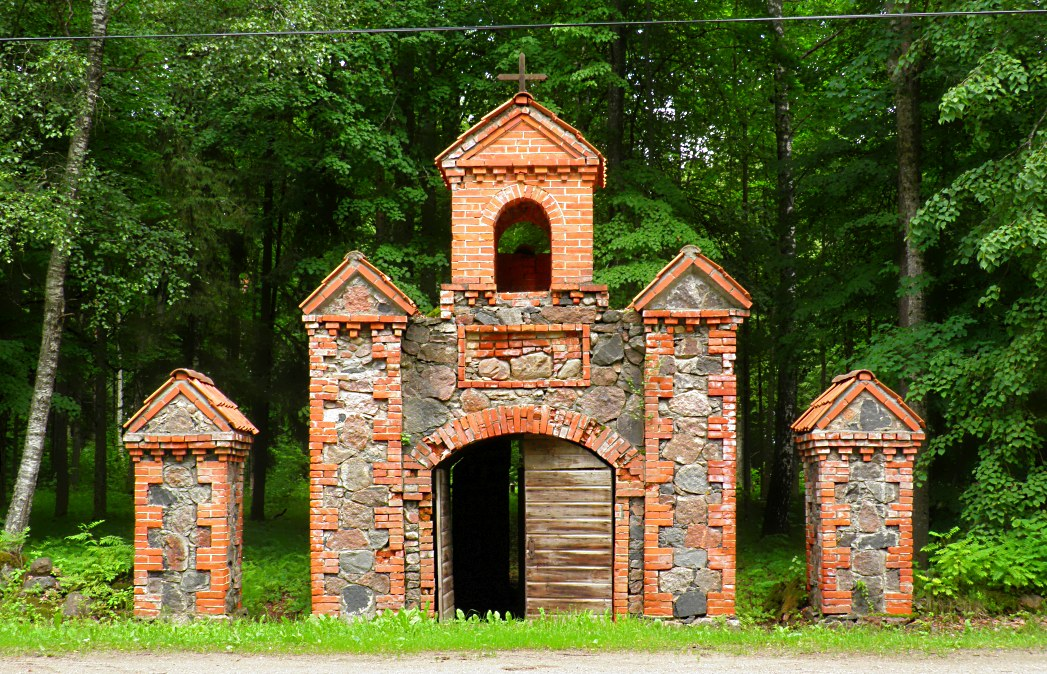
- Vilkupe cemetery

- Location of Vilkupe within Latvia
- Coordinates: 56°07′33″N 25°49′51″E
- Country: Latvia
- Municipality: Jēkabpils
- Parish: Aknīste

Population (2017)
  - Total: 17

Vilkupe [Wolves' river] is a small village in Aknīste Parish, Jēkabpils Municipality in the Selonia region of Latvia. Vilkupe borders Gārsene (Gārsene Manor), Asere (Asare), and Susēja. The village center is located in the Suseja river valley. Road V822 connects village to it neighbors.

Three rivers flow through the village, the Dienvidsusēja River, Dobe River and Vilkupe River. Also, there are two lakes, Vilkupe (Zuju) lake and Mežezers (Forest lake).

There are about 80 residents of the village, but their number is decreasing every year. The village has about 27 houses, of which people live in only 17.

== Tourist attractions ==
Three old inns are located in Vilkupe, Vārpu Krogs, the Velna Krogs (Devil's Inn) and Skursteņkrogs. Ancient water mill sluice wall fragments of an old stone bridge over the river Dobe, Eglona-Susēja canal built during the reign of Duke Jacob, milk processing plant and a sovkhoz (state farm) which nowadays is abandoned.
