= List of protected heritage sites in Incourt, Belgium =

This table shows an overview of the protected heritage sites in the Walloon town Incourt, Belgium. This list is part of Belgium's national heritage.

Object	Year/architect	Town/section	Address	Coordinates	Number^{?}	Image
Tumulus of Glimes and surrounding area ^{(nl)} ^{(fr)}		Incourt		50.676784°N 4.832763°E	25043-CLT-0001-01 Info	Tumulus van Glimes en omliggend terrein
Ruins of Opprebais castle: towers, keep, curtain walls and barn and ensemble formed by the ruins, church, cemetery and surrounding area ^{(nl)} ^{(fr)}		Incourt		50.682692°N 4.796787°E	25043-CLT-0003-01 Info	Ruïnes van kasteel Opprebais: torens, donjon, gordijnen en schuur en ensemble gevormd door de ruïnes, kerk, begraafplaats en de omliggende terreinen
Farm of Chise: facades and roofs, and surrounding area ^{(nl)} ^{(fr)}		Incourt		50.739023°N 4.761062°E	25043-CLT-0004-01 Info	Boerderij van Chise: gevels en daken, en omliggende terreinen
Tumulus of Glimes and surrounding area ^{(nl)} ^{(fr)}		Incourt		50.676784°N 4.832763°E	25043-PEX-0001-01 Info	Tumulus van Glimes en omliggend terrein

== See also ==
- Lists of protected heritage sites in Walloon Brabant
- Incourt, Belgium
