= Jozef Tiso's speech in Holíč =

1942 speech by the president of the Slovak Republic

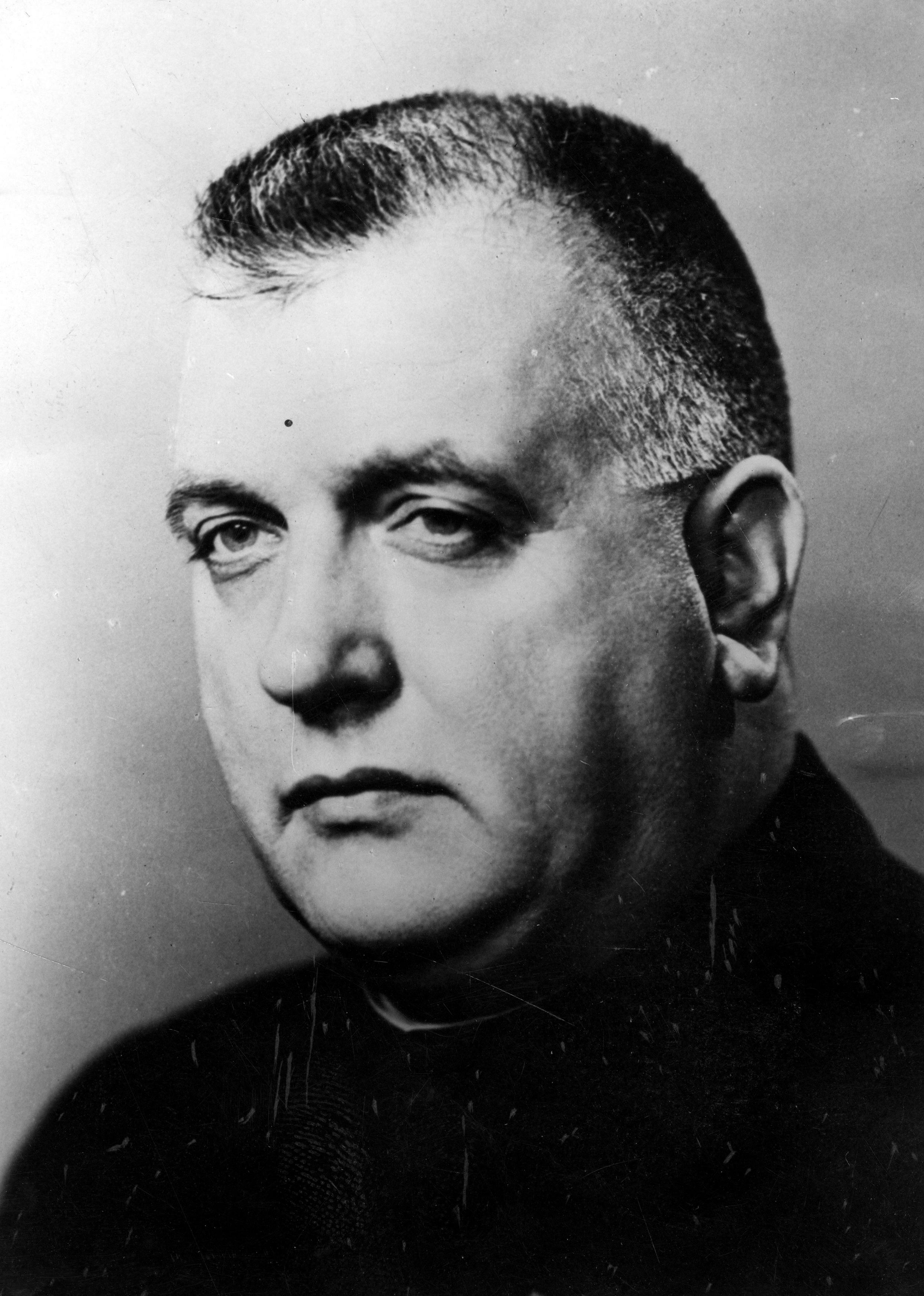
Jozef Tiso, c. 1936

In August 1942, Jozef Tiso, president of the Slovak State and a Catholic priest, delivered a speech in Holíč, Slovakia, in which he defended the deportation of Jews from Slovakia. Referring to Jews as "parasites" and "the eternal enemy", Tiso claimed that their deportation was both economically necessary and congruent with Christian moral principles. The speech has been recognized as a key part of Tiso's moral legacy, emblematic of his complicity in the Holocaust.

== Background ==
In March 1939, the Slovak State declared independence from Czechoslovakia; Germany invaded the Czech rump state. That October, Jozef Tiso, a Catholic priest, became president of Slovakia. In an 8 March petition, Slovak Jewish community leaders exhorted Tiso to cancel the planned deportation of Slovakia's Jews because it represented the "physical destruction of the Jews in Slovakia". Tiso ignored the petition, as well as the condemnation of papal ambassador Giuseppe Burzio. At the time of Tiso's speech, 55,000 Jews out of 89,000 (Note: Estimate is from the 1940 census. However, very few Jews were able to emigrate after 1940.) had been deported from the Slovak State in 54 transports; the deportations had been halted on 1 August 1942. The Slovak government knew that the deportees were being systematically murdered.

== Content ==
In the speech, which was delivered on the 15th, 16th, or 17th of August 1942 in Holíč, Slovakia, Tiso argued that the deportation of Jews was consistent with Christian ethics, and furthermore a positive commandment from God:

People ask whether what is being done with the Jews is Christian. Is it human? Is it not robbery? ... I ask is it Christian when the nation wants to free itself from its eternal enemy—the Jew? ... Love of self is a command from God, and this love of self commands me to remove ... everything that damages me or that threatens my life. I don't think I need to convince anyone that the Jewish element threatened the lives of Slovaks. ... It would have looked even worse if we hadn't pulled ourselves together in time, if we hadn't purged them from us. And we did so according to divine command: Slovak, cast off your parasite.

Tiso claimed that Slovak Jews, representing only 5% of the population, earned 38% of the national income. He also distinguished himself from the radical wing of his party (the Slovak People's Party), invoking "that [old] slogan: 'Jews to Birobidzhan'"—which Tiso considered "a little bit too far". He claimed that Adolf Hitler was giving the Jews an independent state where the deported Jews were living, and argued that the remaining Jews had to be deported to allow the development of Slovakia. Tiso also repeated the doctrine of Andrej Hlinka, the founder of the Slovak People's Party, that "a Jew remains a Jew even if he is baptized by a hundred bishops".

== Reactions ==
On 30 August, Hitler remarked, "It is interesting how this little Catholic priest—Tiso—is sending us the Jews!" The Hlinka Guard's newspaper wrote, "[now] no one has the right ... to doubt about the justice of deporting Jews". Dieter Wisliceny, SS officer and Judenberater in Slovakia, referred to Tiso's speech when arguing for the resumption of deportations in a letter dated 18 August. Slovak clergy did not react positively to the speech, critical of Tiso's political opportunism and presentation of self-love as a divine commandment. In September and October, another 2,800 Jews were deported from Slovakia; the deportations would not resume until 1944.

== Modern interpretations ==
According to Austrian historian Arnold Suppan, the speech was "similar to the worst anti-Semitic Nazi propaganda". Slovak historian Eduard Nižňanský notes that the speech differed little from Tiso's previous statements on the Jews, such as his speech on Aryanization in Višňové in September 1940. Although his claims negated the Christian commandment to "love your neighbor as yourself", he appealed to nationalism to imply that Jews might not be covered by this obligation. According to Nižňanský, Tiso's aim may have been to ease the consciences of Slovaks who were uncomfortable with the regime's actions, or to disguise the brutality of deportation. Nižňanský argues that the speech should be considered in the context of Herbert Kelman's theory that "routinization" and dehumanization led to Holocaust atrocities. Tiso's speech was part of that routinization because many Slovaks trusted his moral evaluations due to his authority as priest-president.

According to American historian James Mace Ward, Tiso intended to appease Nazi Germany and the radical faction of the Slovak People's Party, which were unhappy with the temporary halt in deportations. Slovak historian Ivan Kamenec wrote that the speech was Tiso's "most significant statement" on the 1942 deportations because many Slovaks believed Tiso's claims due to his authority as president and priest. Kamenec believes that it was difficult to tell if Tiso was "a cynical political demagogue looking for ... a justification for the evident crime against humanity" in which he had been complicit, or whether the speech demonstrated "political schizophrenia". According to Ward, the "infamous" speech became the "moral epigraph" of Tiso's presidency.
