= Holíč Castle =

Historical landmark in Holíč, Slovakia

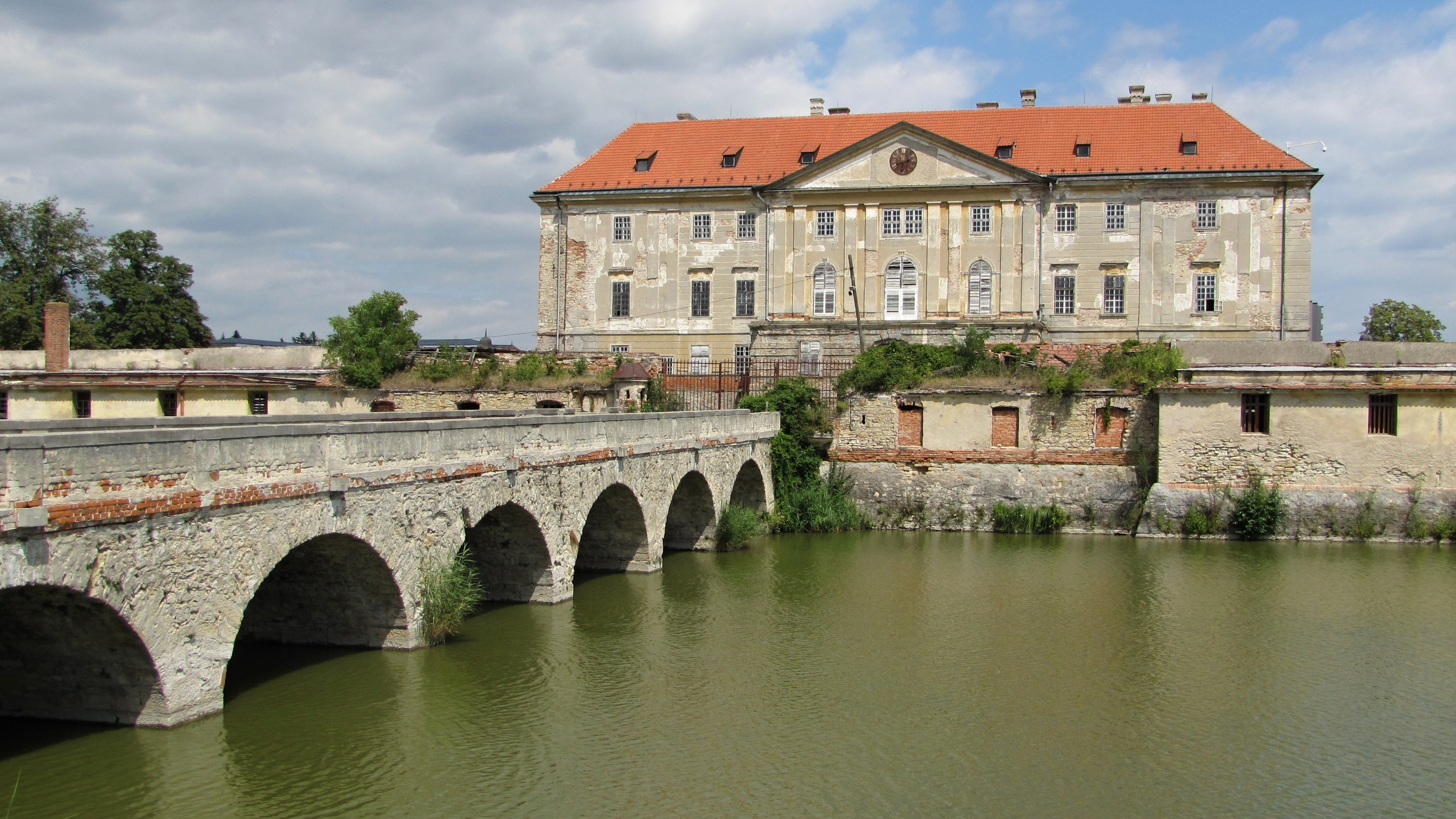

- Location within Slovakia
- 48.808618°N 17.157223°E
- Location: Holíč, Slovakia

Holíč Castle is a Baroque manor house and a historical landmark in Holíč, Slovakia. The manor house was built as a summer residence by the Habsburgs in the 18th century. It replaced an older military fortification dating back to the 12th century.

The original stone castle was built on the Moravian-Hungarian border in the 13th century as a border fortress. The location remains a border area in the 21st century. The site is located in Slovakia, approximately 1 km from the border with the Czech Republic and 25 km from the border with Austria.

== History ==
The oldest archaeological findings in the Holíč area date from the Neolithic period, and there are findings from the Bronze Age, Iron Age and the Roman time. For the better part of the 13th century, Holíč was the seat of a border comitatus. Following a Mongol invasion in 1241, the Árpád dynasty decided to build a new stone castle on the site of an older wooden water castle which stood there since the 11th century. A document from 1256 mentions the castle as Wywar, meaning "New Castle".

The look and purpose of the castle kept changing throughout subsequent centuries. Under the ownership of Matthias Csák of Trenčín, a single-storey Gothic palace was built on the site around 1315. An underground system of castle corridors was also constructed in the 14th century. They connected different parts of the castle as well as the utility buildings. Later the castle came into the possession of Stibor of Stiborice. The site underwent another large-scale transformation in the mid 15th century when another palace was added, while most of the pre-Gothic fortification was taken apart. The late Gothic structures from the 15th century were replaced in the Renaissance period by an anti-Turkish star fortification, connected by casemates with an external and internal moat. At the same time, a basement was dug under almost the entire courtyard. Utility buildings were placed near the outer perimeter. The northern and extended western wing of the manor house was also completed. This Renaissance star fortress was completed after 1678.

After 1736, when the town and the castle became the property of the Franz I, Holy Roman Emperor (husband of Maria Theresa), the Renaissance fortress was gradually reconstructed into a three-winged Baroque mansion. Testifying to the royals' interest in the site, the reconstruction was carried out under the supervision of some of the most important Austrian architects and artists at the time: Franz Anton Hillebrandt, Jean Nicolas Jadot and Joseph Chamant. A broad new central street connecting the town and the castle was also added during the renovation. The primary purpose of the new manor house was to be a summer retreat of the Habsburgs. The mansion had almost 100 rooms in 1799.

The Baroque transformation of the Holíč Castle was a major construction event, the result of which ranks among the best Baroque works in Slovakia. The monumentality of the building, its generous architectural concept and historical realities later led to its recognition as a National Cultural Monument in 1970.

Following the establishment of the Czechoslovak Republic in 1918, the manor house was nationalized. A school was established in one part, while other buildings were used for agricultural purposes. The manor house has been falling into disrepair since. As of 2021, most of the site is in need of renovation.

== See also ==
- Holíč
- Skalica
- Franz I, Holy Roman Emperor
- List of castles in Slovakia
- zámok
