= Glimes =

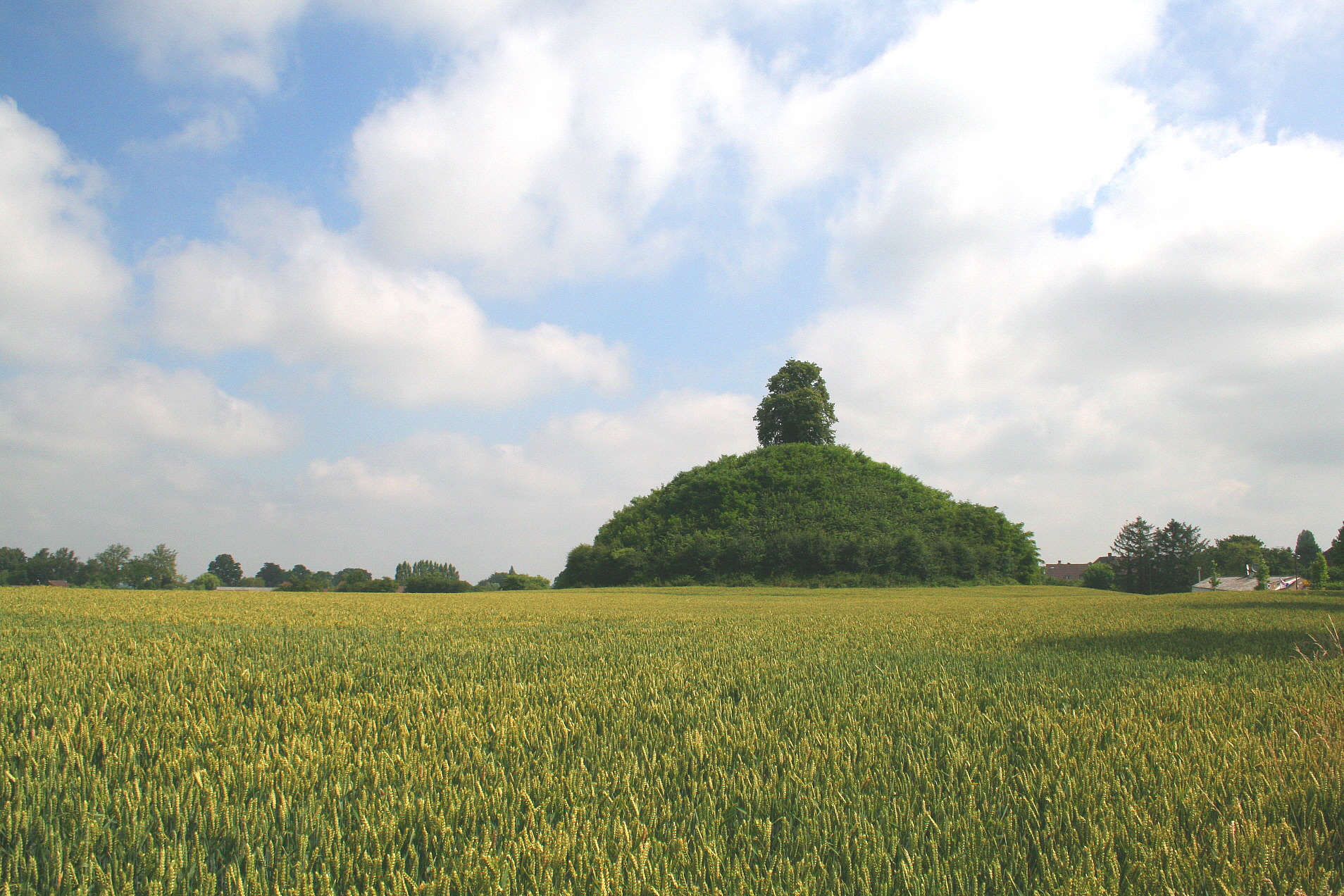
- Glimes, the Tumulus of Glimes

- Location within Belgium Location within Europe
- Coordinates: 50°40′49″N 04°50′20″E
- Country: Belgium
- Region: Wallonia
- Province: Walloon Brabant
- Municipality: Incourt

Glimes is a district of the municipality of Incourt, located in the province of Walloon Brabant, Belgium.

Glimes contains one of the best-preserved tumuli from Gallo-Roman times in Belgium, the Tumulus of Glimes. Archaeological research carried out in 2002 determined that it dates from c. 130–150 AD. In addition, there are several historic farm houses in Glimes. The village church dates from 1882–1886 and is built in a Neo-Gothic style.
