= Opprebais Castle =

13th-century fortified farmhouse in Opprebais, Wallonia, Belgium

Coordinates: 50.682°N 4.796°E

- Belgium
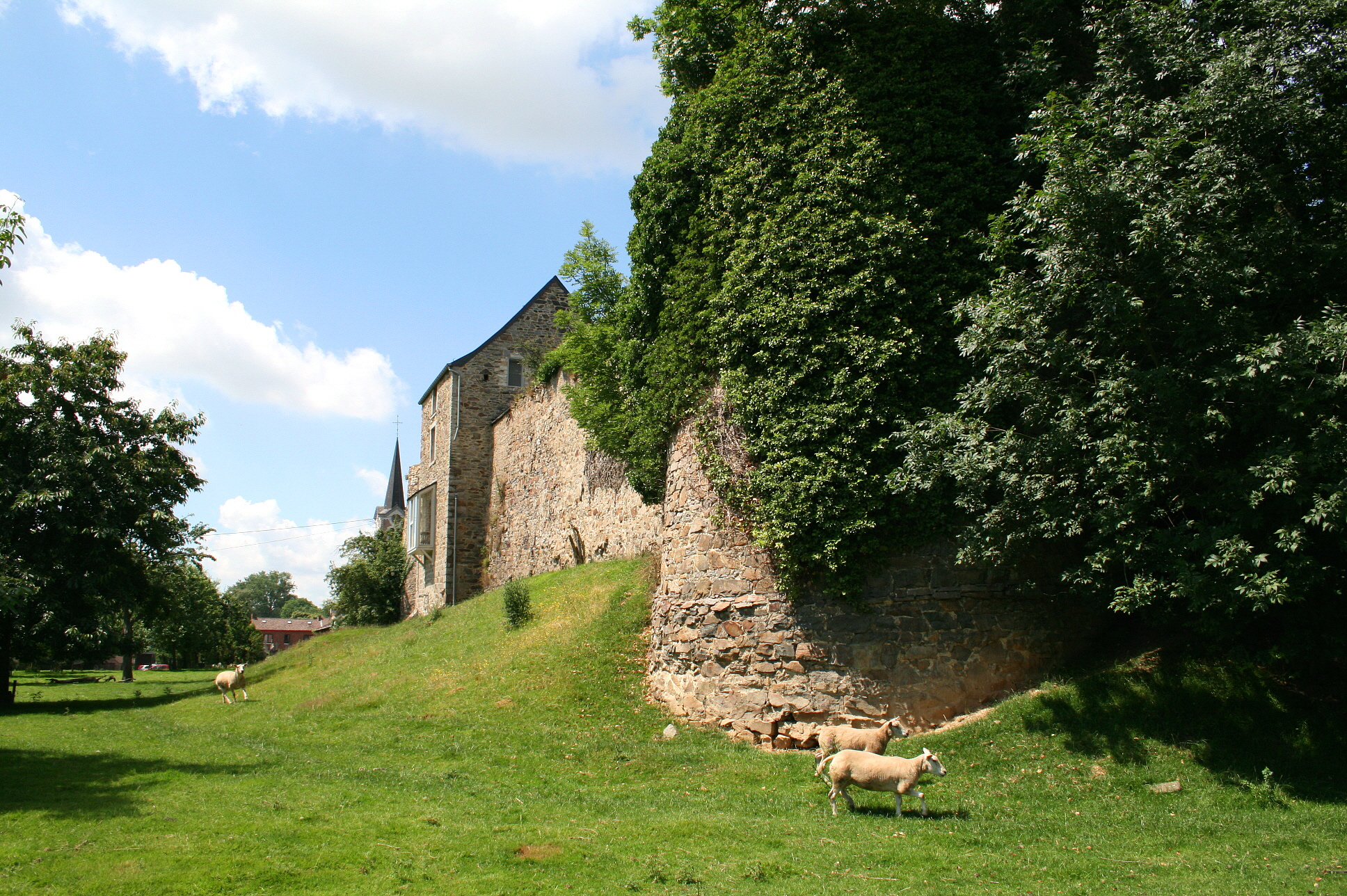

Site information
- Type: Castle

Opprebais Castle (French: Château d'Opprebais) is a 13th-century fortified farmhouse (château-ferme) in Opprebais, Wallonia, in the municipality of Incourt, Walloon Brabant, Belgium.

== See also ==
- List of castles in Belgium
