= Holíč windmill =

Windmill in Slovakia

- Veterný mlyn v Holíč
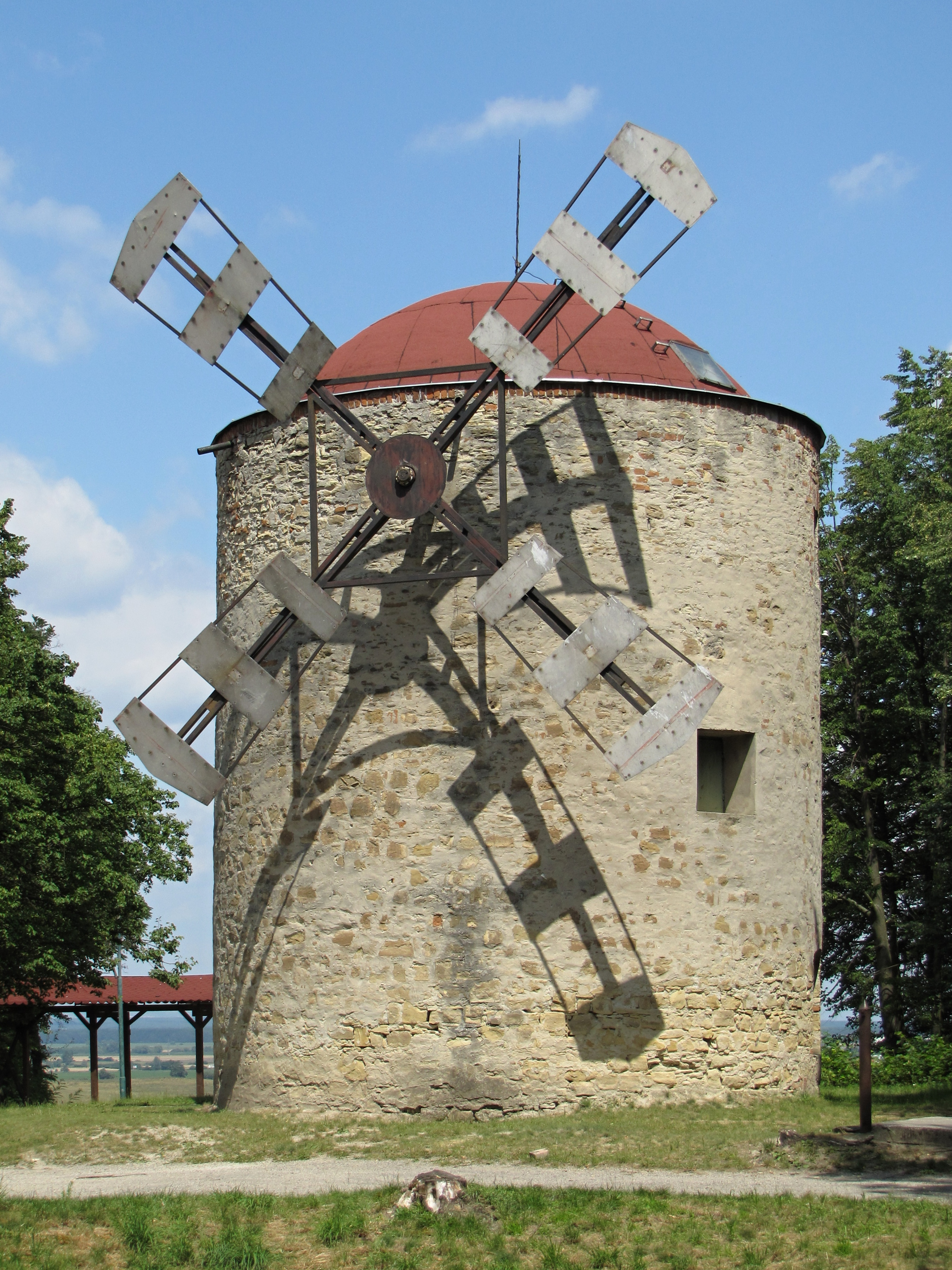
- The Holíč windmill
- Interactive map of the Holíč windmill area

General information
- Type: Stone
- Location: Holíč, Trnava Region, Slovakia
- Coordinates: 48.7999°N 17.1727°E
- Opened: Circa 1880s

Holíč windmill (Slovak: Veterný mlyn v Holíči) is a historical technical monument dating from the 1880s. It is located southeast of the town on the hill Hrebeň. It is the only preserved windmill of its type in Slovakia. Built in the 1880s, the mill was in operation until 1926.

== History ==
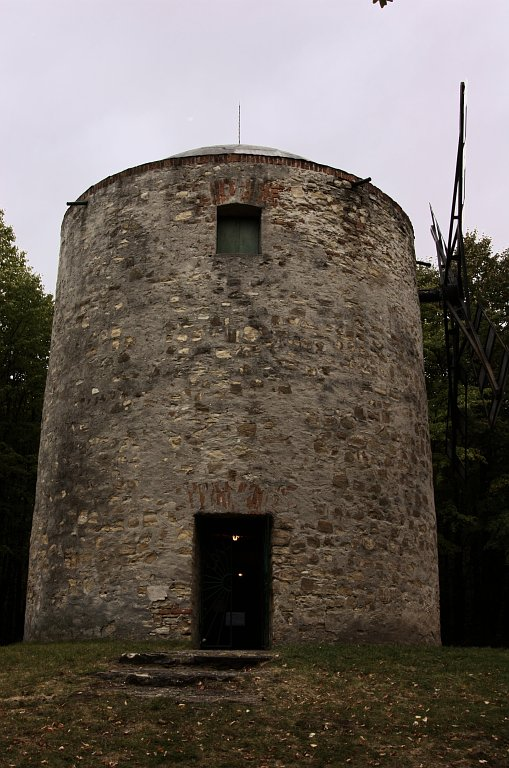
The windmill in 2008, prior to it reconstruction.

The original wooden mill is depicted in an engraving from 1801. It was one of the oldest German-style wooden mills in Slovakia and the Czech Republic. The windmill in Holíč was built in the second half of the 19th century. The mill was later replaced by a stone three-story mill of the Dutch type. The master carpenter František Sláma was responsible for its construction. The original wooden dome was replaced by a brick dome after 1927. The mill subsequently fell into disrepair until 1970, when it was repaired by the local hunting association.

In 1972, the mill was included in the list of Cultural Heritage Monuments of Slovakia.

=== Recent years ===
Currently, cultural and social events are held in the vicinity of the mill. The mill is open to the public by appointment. In 2013, the Slovak Post issued a postage stamp depicting the mill.

== Description ==
In 2018, after Holíč had gained full ownership of the mill, it was reconstructed, regaining its original revolving roof with blades.

== See also ==
- List of windmills
