= Opprebais =

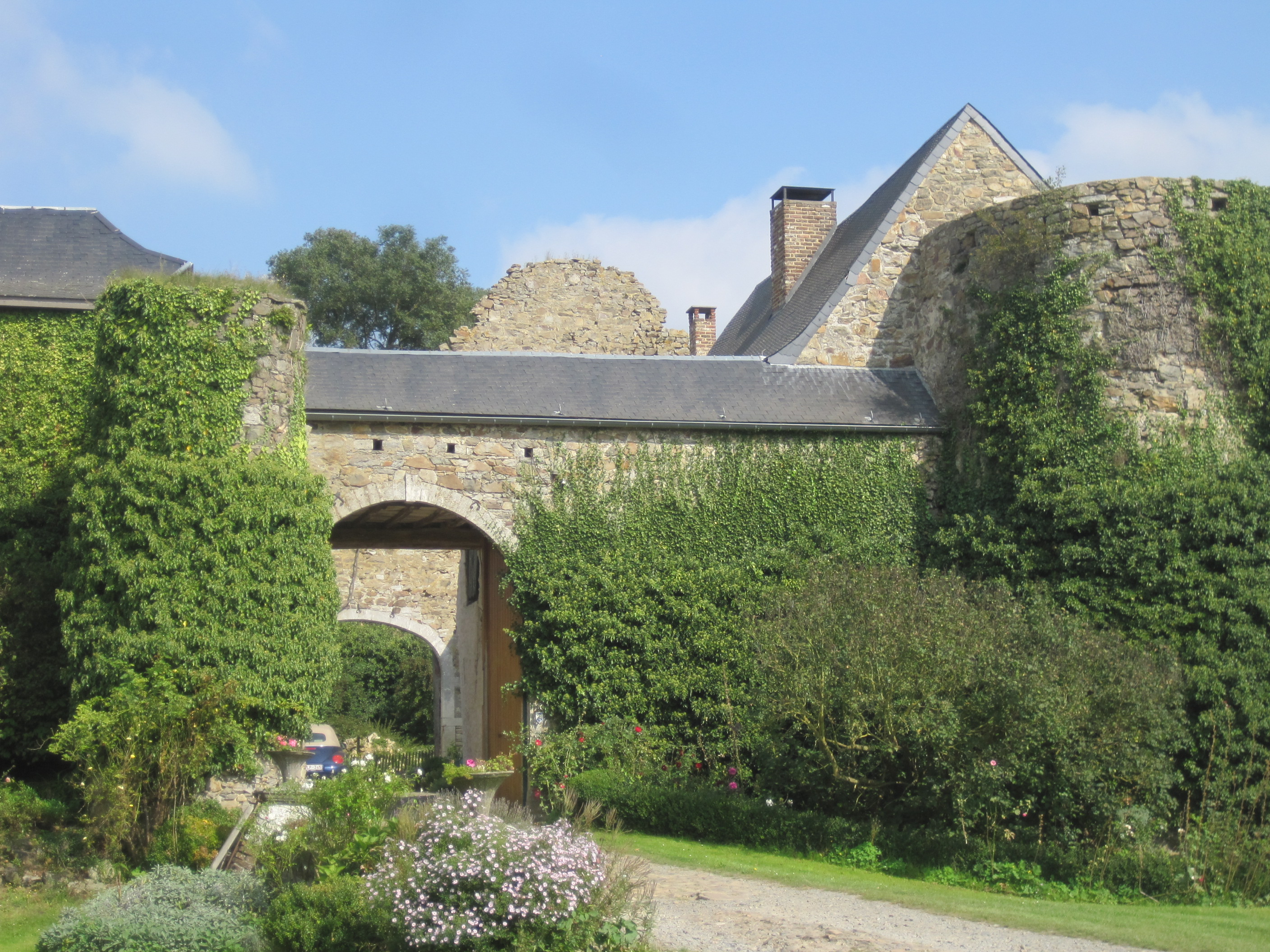
- Opprebais Castle

- Location within Belgium Location within Europe
- Coordinates: 50°40′54″N 04°47′48″E
- Country: Belgium
- Region: Wallonia
- Province: Walloon Brabant
- Municipality: Incourt

Opprebais is a district of the municipality of Incourt, located in the province of Walloon Brabant, Belgium.

The earliest mention of the settlement dates from 1036. Among the historical farmhouses in the village, Opprebais Castle, in fact a fortified farmhouse, or château-ferme, dates from the 13th century. The village also has a historical church and a windmill which in its current form dates from 1854.
