= List of windmills in Belgium =

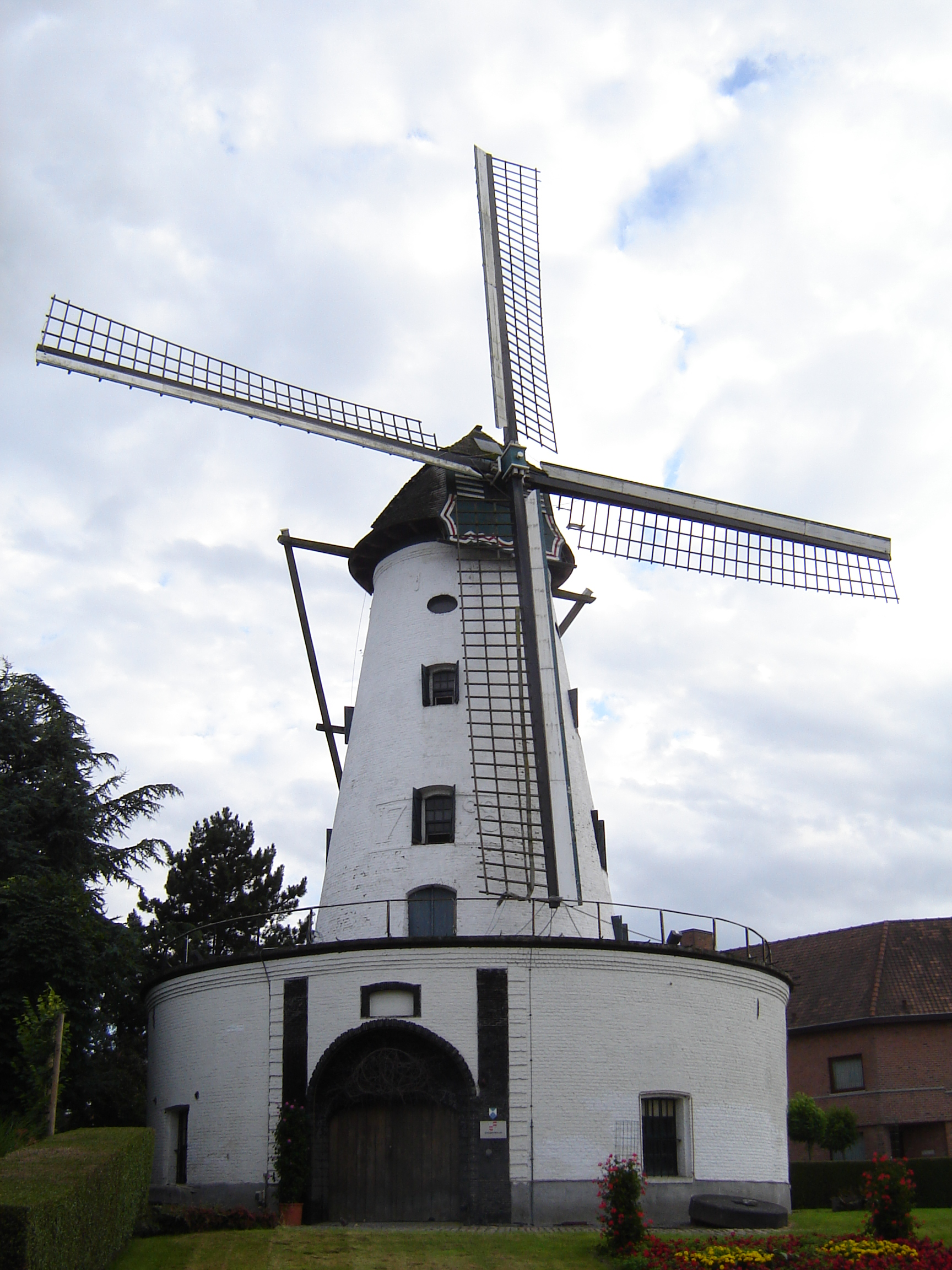
Example of a Belgian windmill (Stenen Molen Klockemolen in Zwevegem)

This is a list of windmills in Belgium.
Belgium is divided into three regions, two of which are subdivided into five provinces each.

== Brussels-Capital Region ==
| Location | Name of mill | Type | Built | Notes | Photograph |
|---|---|---|---|---|---|
| Anderlecht | Luizenmolen | Post mill | 1864 | Molenechos (in Dutch) | |
| Anderlecht | Luizenmolen | Post mill | 1999 | Molenechos (in Dutch) | |
| Evere | Mill of Evere | Tower mill | 1841 | Molenechos (in Dutch) | |
| Woluwe-Saint-Lambert | Burnt Mill | Post mill | 1988 | Molenechos (in Dutch) | |

== Walloon Region ==
=== Liège ===
| Location | Name of mill | Type | Built | Notes | Photograph |
|---|---|---|---|---|---|
| Corswarem | Le Vieux Molen | Grondzeiler | 1840 | Molenechos (in Dutch) | |
| Donceel | Moulin Bertrand | Grondzeiler | 1890 | Molenechos (in Dutch) | |
| Fexhe-le-Haut-Clocher | Moulin de Fexhe | Grondzeiler | 1843 | Molenechos (in Dutch) | |
| Momalle | Moulin de Momalle | Bergmolen | 1850 | Molenechos (in Dutch) | |
| Othée | Moulin du Château | Grondzeiler | 1856 | Molenechos (in Dutch) | |
| Pousset | Moulin de Pousset | Grondzeiler | 1819 | Molenechos (in Dutch) | |

=== Luxembourg ===
No windmills standing in this province.

=== Walloon Brabant ===
| Location | Name of mill | Type | Built | Notes | Photograph |
|---|---|---|---|---|---|
| Beauvechain | Moulin Haccourt | Bergmolen | 1896 | Molenechos (in Dutch) | |
| Lillois-Witterzée | Moulin de Lillois | Stellingmolen | 1860 | Molenechos (in Dutch) | |
| Nil-Saint-Vincent-Saint-Martin | Moulin de Tiège | Grondzeiler | 1834 | Molenechos (in Dutch) | |
| Ohain | Moulin d'Argenteuil; Moulin des Baraques; Moulin de Broc et Bo | Staakmolen | 1962 | Molenechos (in Dutch) | |
| Opprebais | Moulin Gustot; Moulin d'Opprebais | Grondzeiler | 1850 | Molenechos (in Dutch) | |
| Rebecq | Moulin Derbaix; Moulin Acheroy | Stellingmolen | 1846 | Molenechos (in Dutch) | |
| Roux-Miroir | Moulin de Roux-Miroir | Bergmolen | 1831 | Molenechos (in Dutch) | |
| Saintes | Moulin d'Hondzocht; Molen van Hondzocht | Bergmolen | 1775 | Molenechos (in Dutch) | |
| Waterloo | | Staakmolen | | | |

== Notes ==
Bold indicates a mill that is still standing. Italics indicates a mill with some remains surviving.
