= The Lily, Stirling Range =

Windmill in Amelup, Western Australia

The Lily
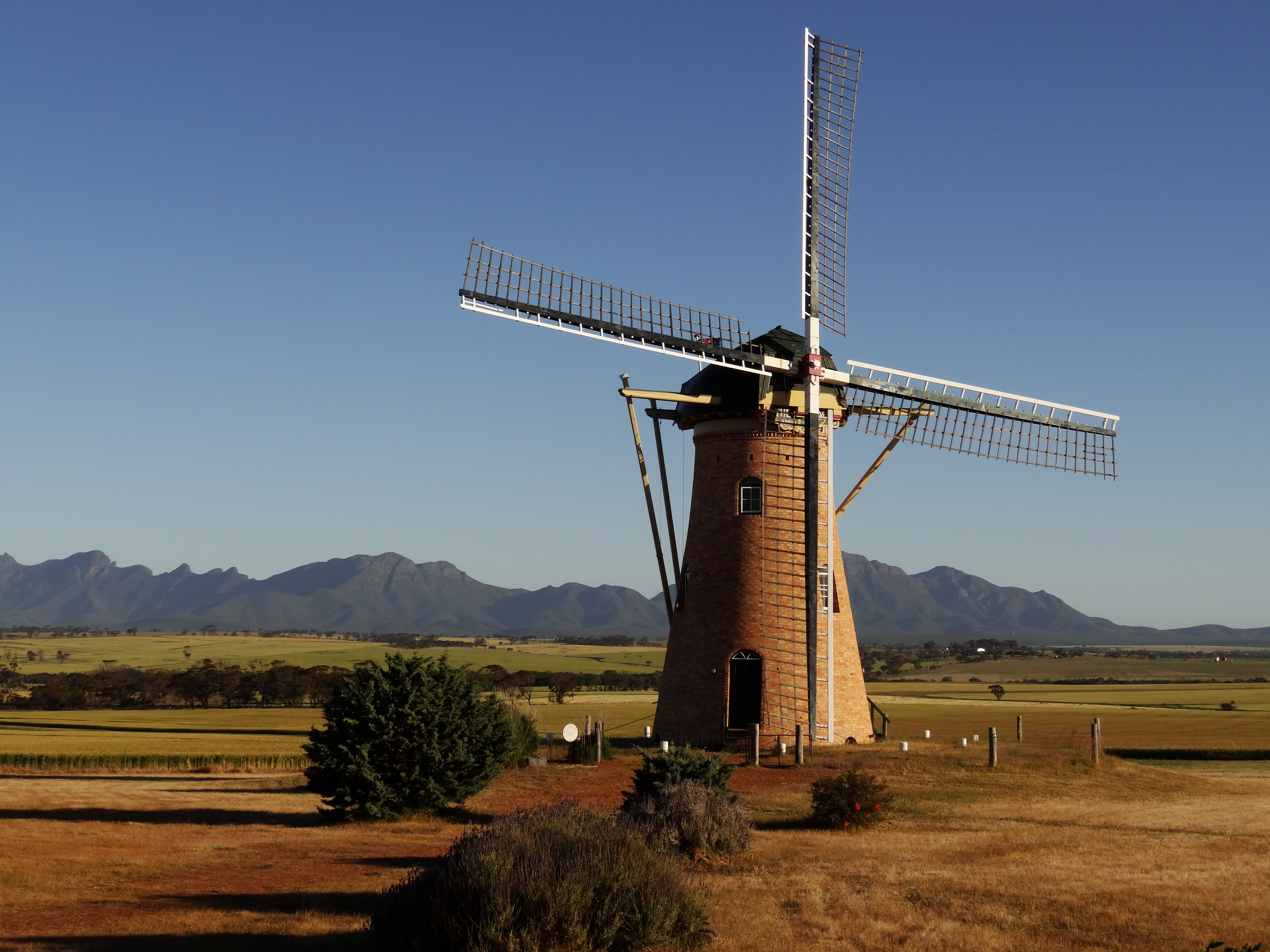
- The Lily with Stirling Range
- Interactive map of The Lily

Origin
- Mill name: The Lily
- Mill location: Amelup, Western Australia
- Coordinates: 34.224423°S 118.215890°E
- Year built: 1997

Information
- Purpose: Flour mill
- Type: Ground sail
- Storeys: 5
- No. of sails: 4
- Type of sails: Common sails
- Windshaft: Oak with cast iron poll end
- Winding: Tailpole and winch
- No. of pairs of millstones: 1
- Size of millstones: 1.4 metres (4 ft 7 in) diameter

The Lily, also known as The Lily Dutch Windmill, is a tower mill located near the towns of Amelup and Borden in the Great Southern region of Western Australia. It is one of Australia's few working traditional windmills.

The Lily is a 16th-century Dutch design windmill of brick construction with 24.6-metre (81 ft) diameter sails. It was built by Dutch born Pleun Hitzert between 1991 and 1997. The Lily is a flour mill equipped with one set of millstones. It is the only working windmill of traditional construction on mainland Australia. Its uniqueness in the Australian landscape combined with the proximity of the Stirling Range has made The Lily a popular tourist landmark.

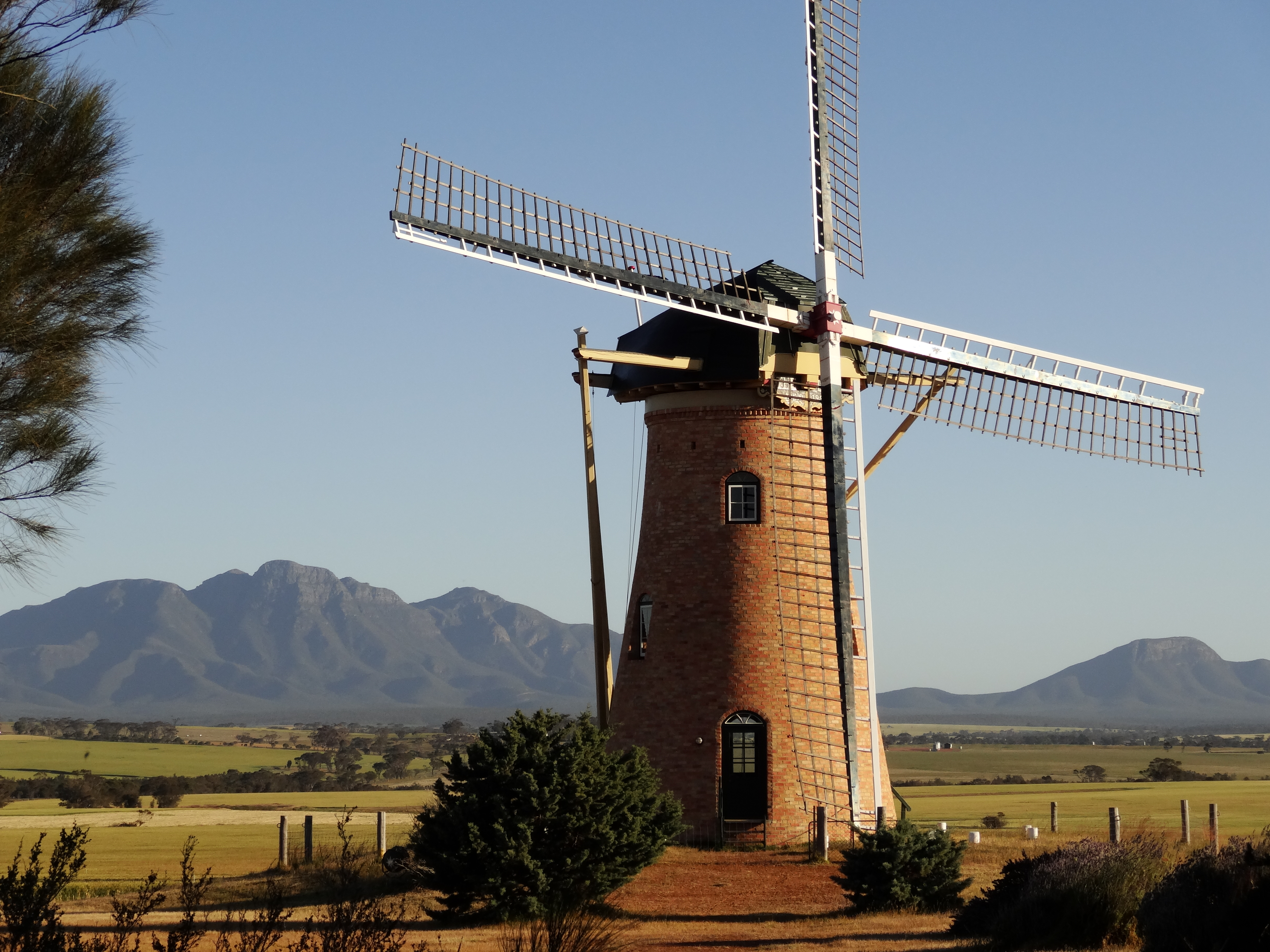
The Lily with Stirling Range

== Design ==
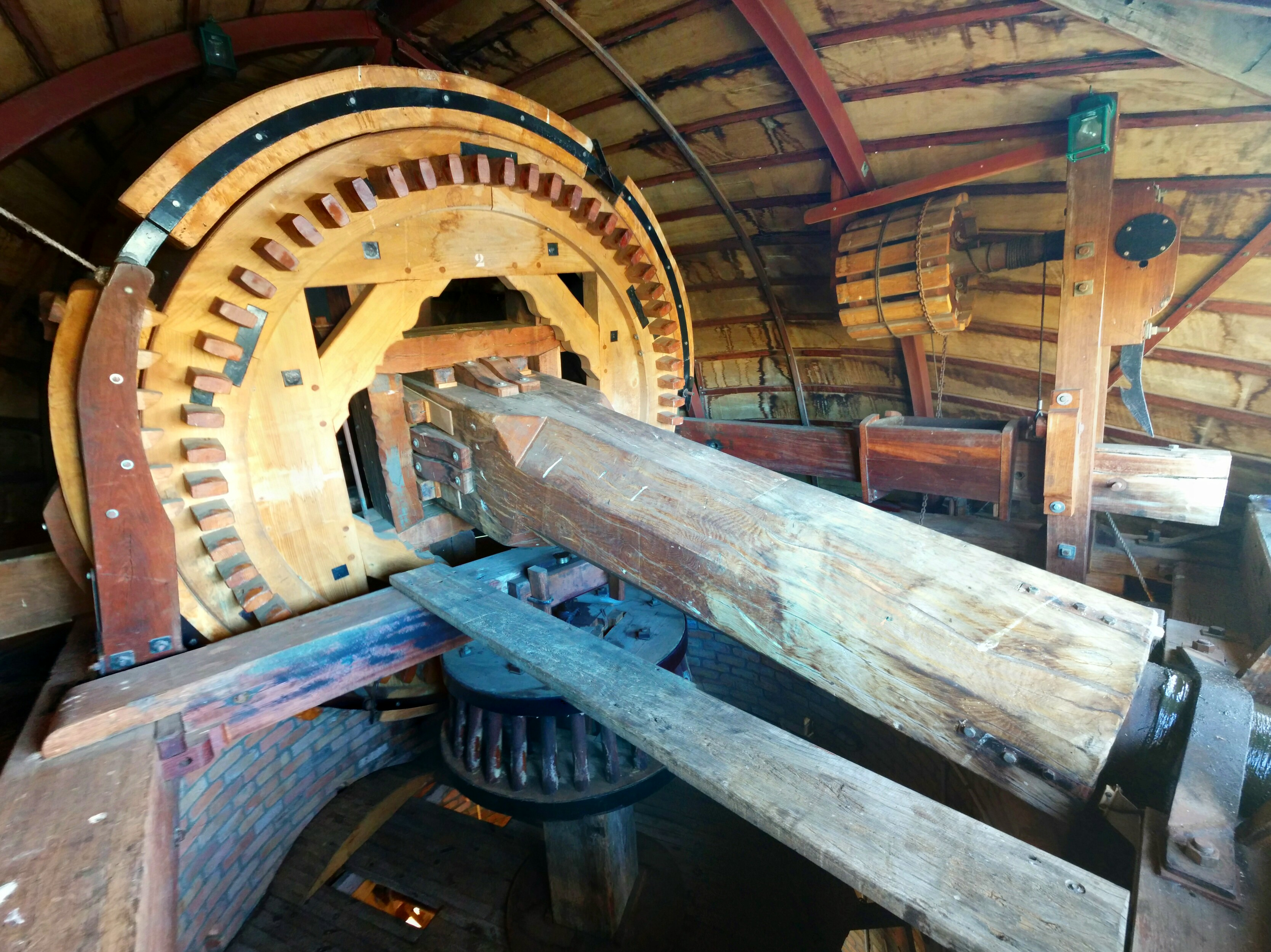
View inside the cap of The Lily

The design of The Lily is inspired by several windmills from the Netherlands but most notably by that of De Lelie (Dutch for "The Lily") located in Puttershoek. The tapering brick tower of The Lily is five storeys high and is of circular cross section. The tower measures in excess of 25 metres (82 ft) from the base of the footing to the cap bearing plate. The wall thickness varies between 550 millimetres (22 in) and 600 mm (24 in). The cap has a mass of approximately 22 tonnes (22 long tons; 24 short tons) and is able to rotate through a full 360 degrees to face the wind. The Common sails are of welded steel stock construction with Russian larch latticework. Canvas sails can be fitted over the latticework to catch more wind and improve the power the windmill can generate.

The Lily has 24.6-metre (81 ft) diameter sails with stocks constructed of welded steel rectangular sections. In strong wind the sails can revolve at around 25 rpm, at which speed the sail tips are travelling at more than 115 kilometres per hour (71 mph). The Lily is equipped with one set of millstones for producing flour. Note that of the two millstones, only the top stone rotates. The gap between the stationary (bottom) stone and the top (rotating) stone can be manually controlled via a rope and pulley system and automatically via a centrifugal governor.

=== Gear train ===
As in many windmills, The Lily features two sets of gears between the sails and the millstones. The first one is between the brake wheel and the wallower which have 63 and 29 teeth respectively. The second gear is formed by the great spur wheel and the stone nut which have 66 and 23 teeth respectively. The number of teeth in each gear has been designed to be coprime to ensure even wear and smooth running of these gears. Both gears together provide a speed increasing gear ratio between sails and millstone of ≈6.2. This means that one complete revolution of the sails causes approximately 6.2 revolutions of the (top) millstone.

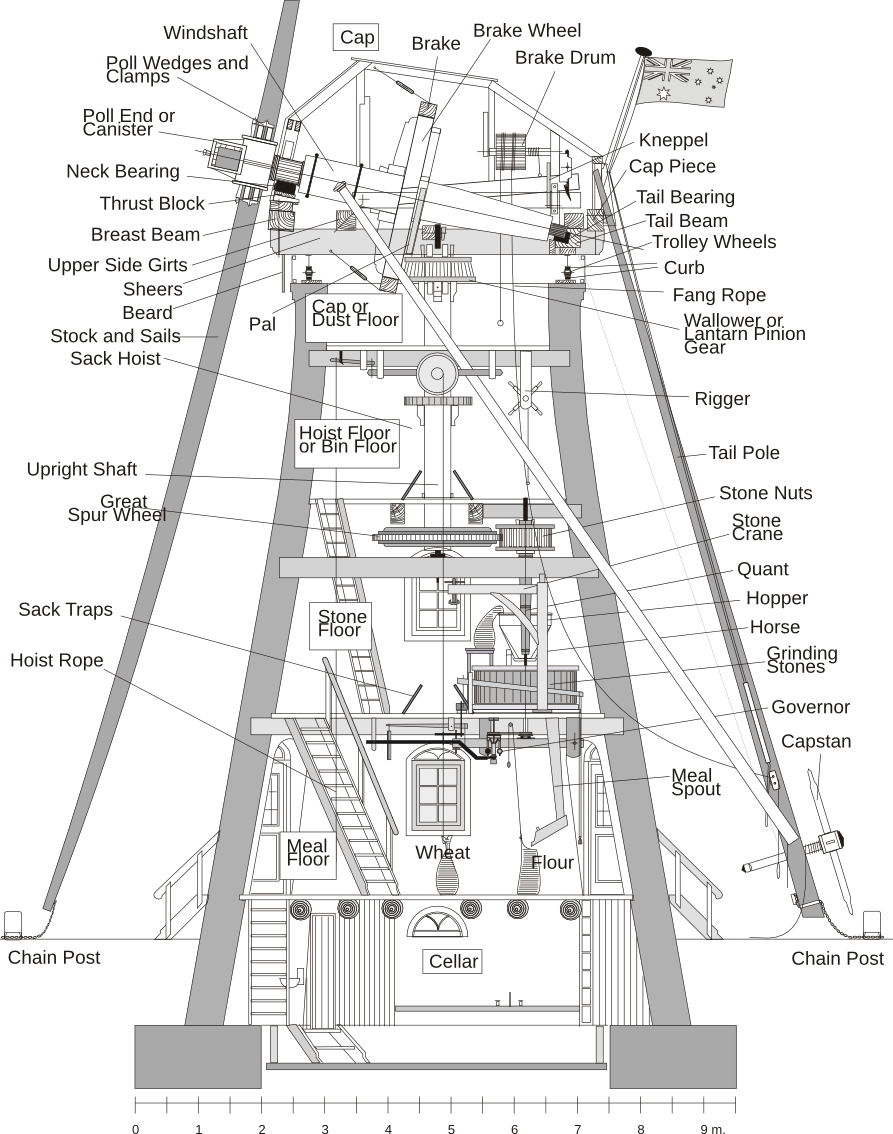
cross section of The Lily

=== Brake ===
The Lily features a Flemish brake design which incorporates a rope drum which lifts a loaded lever which in turn pulls a set of wooden blocks tightly around the windshaft (the shaft the sails are mounted on). This brake design which is similar to a band brake is very effective when the sails are facing the wind, but much less so when the wind is coming from behind. For this reason a ‘kneppel’ is installed which prevents counter-rotation of the sails when the windmill has stopped.

=== Windshaft bearings ===
The rotating assembly of stocks, sails, windshaft, brake wheel etc. is supported on two bearings. The neck bearing supports by far the largest fraction of the weight. This is a plain bearing which supports the majority of the vertical component of the weight of the rotating assembly. The bearing block is of solid brass construction and is lubricated with animal fat. The shaft lays in a shallow groove of the neck bearing block and is kept in position by the weight of the rotating assembly. The tail bearing supports the remainder of the vertical weight and any (horizontal) thrust generated by the wind. The neck bearing does not react to any thrust forces.

== Construction ==
All the main parts of The Lily except the millstones have been constructed in the period between 1991 and 1997 virtually single-handedly by Pleun Hitzert. In preparation for building The Lily, Pleun travelled to the Netherlands to work with experienced millwrights in order to learn how to operate and build a windmill. Even though the windmill was essentially complete in 1997, no millstones were fitted at that time. This was because at that time The Lily restaurant and cafe occupied the bottom three floors of the windmill. It wasn't until a new restaurant (housed in the re-constructed Gnowangerup railway station building) was constructed next to the windmill that the flour milling equipment could be fitted in the windmill. This work was carried out in 2003 after which The Lily produced its first flour, from grains grown on the property that surrounds the mill.

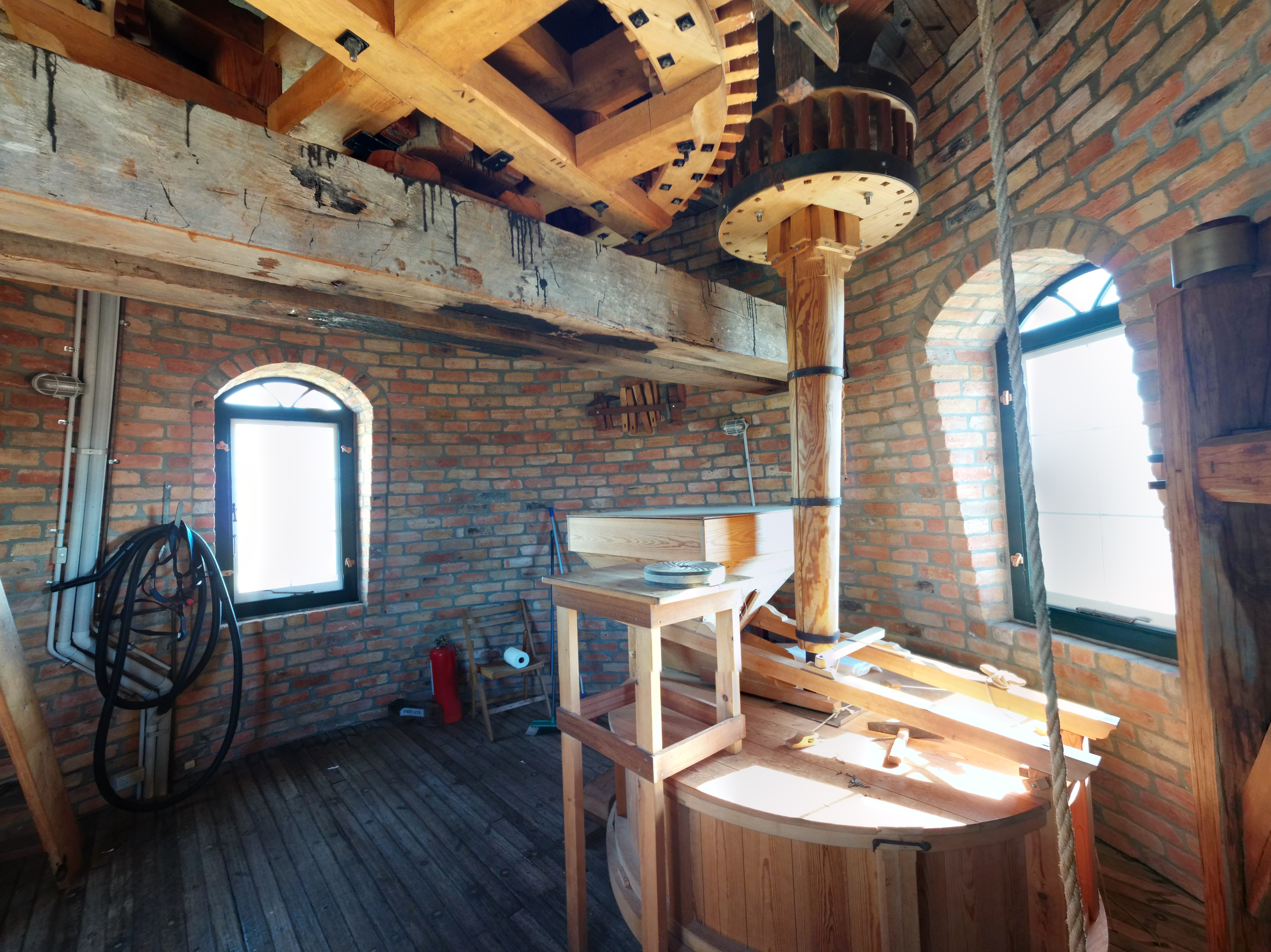
Millstone in The Lily

=== Recycled material use ===
Extensive use has been made of recycled materials for the construction of The Lily.

- The brick tower was constructed with handmade bricks from the Broomehill co-op store, which was destroyed by fire in 1991. These bricks were transported to The Lily's construction site and cleaned there by hand.
- The structural timbers were sourced from the old Albany deep water jetty and from old telephone poles, both of which are made of native Australian wood.
- The tail has been made from the stock of a sail of the windmill Landzigt in the Netherlands which was destroyed by a fire in 1990.
- Cross-arms from telephone poles were used for the flooring.

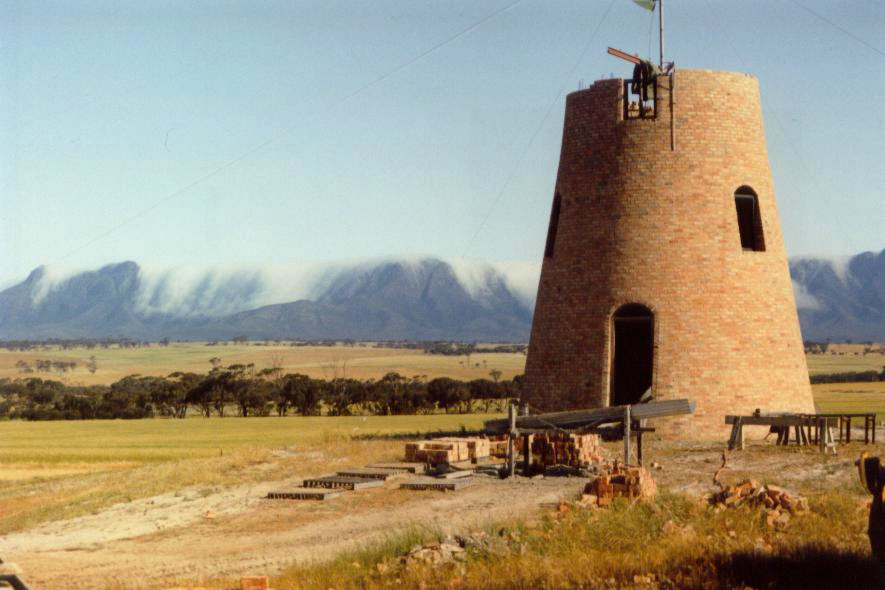
The brick tower of The Lily windmill under construction

== Operation ==
The Lily can be operated by one person, but during milling the assistance of a second person is desirable. Due to its location The Lily can mill flour during most times of the year, as good winds are frequently available. Although the milling stones can be used to mill a large variety of wheat, it is almost exclusively used to produce spelt flour.

== See also ==
- List of windmills in Australia
