= List of windmills in Israel =

This is a list of windmills in Israel. Israel has five windmills, of which three are located in the center and two in the north. It also has wind turbines. Out of the five windmills, only the windmill in Haifa, one of two in the north, has no sails. Jerusalem, in the center, has the only "concentration" of windmills: two restored 19th-century windmills at a 10 minute walking distance.

Location	Name of mill	Type	Built	Notes	Photograph
Haifa	Bat Galim Windmill	Tower	1873	The Bat Galim windmill was built in 1873 by the Templers (religious believers).	
Jerusalem	Montefiore Windmill	Tower	1857	The Montefiore Windmill, or Jaffa Gate Mill was built by Holman's of Canterbury, Kent, United Kingdom in 1857 for Sir Moses Montefiore. The top of the mill was blown up in the 1947–1949 Palestine war in 1948. The mill was restored to working order in 2012.	
Jerusalem	Rehavia Windmill	Tower	1870s	The Rehavia windmill was built in the 1870s. In 1935, Erich Mendelsohn converted its upper floors into a study. It served as the Dutch Consulate during the 1950s and 1960s. As of 2015, the building houses a restaurant.	
Mishmar HaShiv'a	Mishmar HaShiv'a Windmill	Tower		The Mishmar HaShiv'a Windmill is a replica of a Dutch mill, built as a memorial to Dutch Jews killed during the Holocaust.	
Migdal Tefen	Tefen Windmill	Tower	2004	The Tefen windmill was built in 2004. Norman from Kfar Vradim came up with the idea. Eli Pele designed, planned and implemented the construction, assisted by Steve Sak.	

== Notes ==
Bold indicates a mill that is still standing. Italics indicates a mill with some remains surviving.
