= Aknīste Parish =

Parish of Latvia

- parish of Latvia
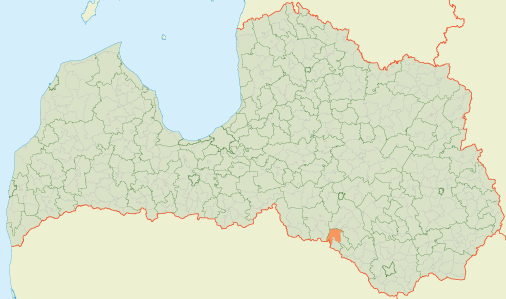
- 56°10′53″N 25°45′29″E
- Country: Latvia

Area
  - Total: 127.61 km^{2} (49.27 sq mi)
  - Land: 127.61 km^{2} (49.27 sq mi)
  - Water: 1.78 km^{2} (0.69 sq mi)

Population (1 January 2024)
  - Total: 341
  - Density: 2.7/km^{2} (6.9/sq mi)

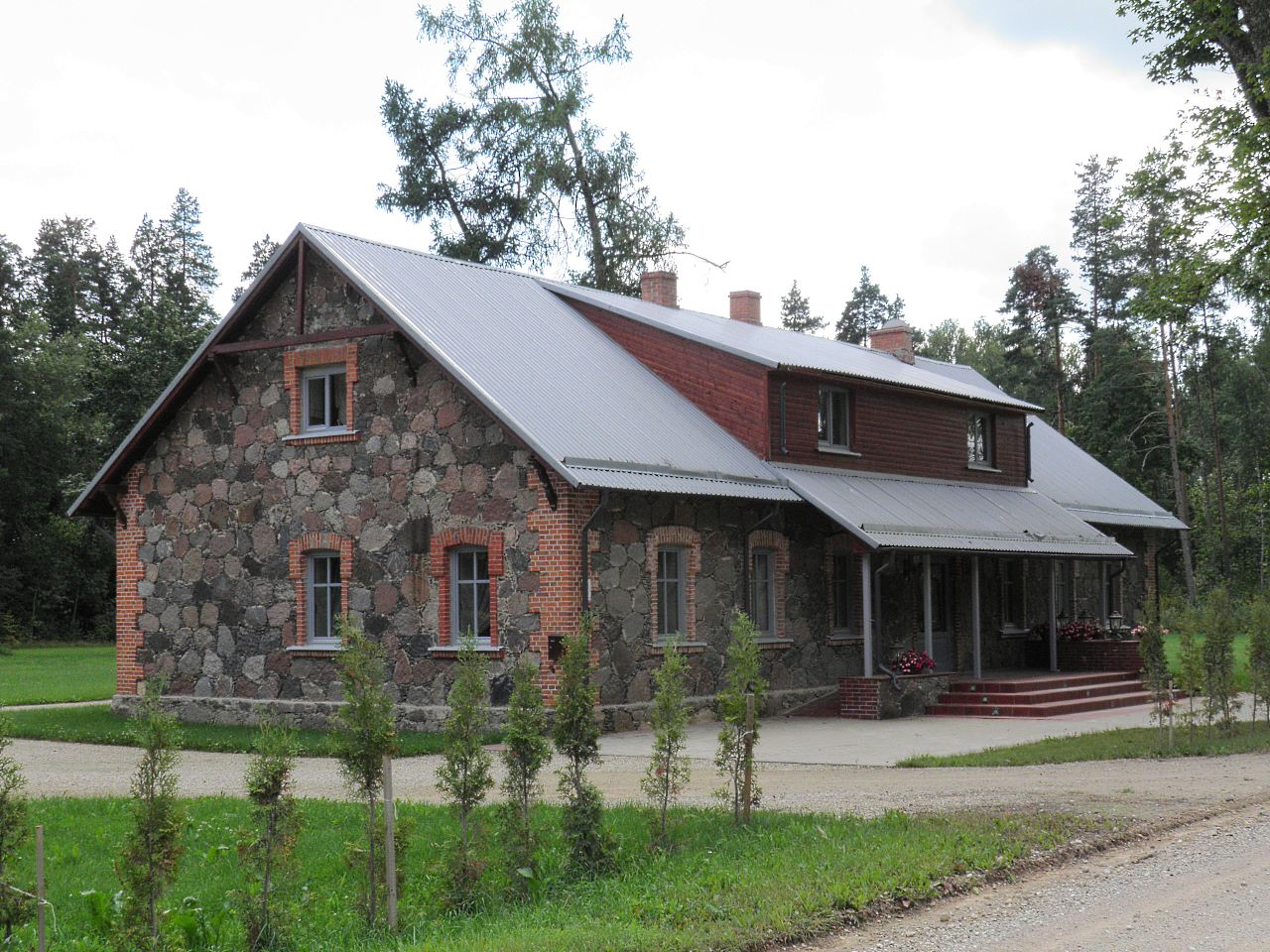
Self-catering cottage "Susēja"

Aknīste Parish (Latvian: Aknīstes pagasts) is a sparsely settled rural jurisdiction at the southern margin of Jēkabpils Municipality in the historical region of Selonia in Latvia. It was constituted on 10 February 2010, when the countryside around the small town of Aknīste was separated as a distinct local authority under amendments to Latvia’s territorial-administration law. The parish straddles rolling farmland on the upper reaches of the Dienvidsusēja River, part of the Augšdaugava upland, and abuts the Lithuanian border to the south. According to the Central Statistical Bureau, the parish had 341 permanent residents on 1 January 2024—barely 2.7 inhabitants per km^{2}—concentrated in the five listed villages of Mežaraupi, Navicki, Pasusēja, Susēja and Vilkupe. Low population density and gently undulating topography favour mixed dairy-and-cereal farming, while cut-over peatlands supply horticultural substrate to a processing plant authorised in the parish's industrial zone.

Aknīste hosts three nationally protected nature sites: the Natura 2000 reserve Baltmuižas purvs, a raised-bog complex bordering parish peat workings; the geological spring group Vecmelderu avoti on a side valley of the Dienvidsusēja; and the glacial‐erratic Dainu akmens in Gārsene park. Management guidelines in the municipal plan prohibit further drainage or extraction within the reserve and restrict forestry near the springs, helping to safeguard the parish's boreal bog, wet-forest and spring habitats as well as nesting black stork and lesser spotted eagle populations.
