= Asare Manor =

Manor in Latvia

- Selonia, Latvia
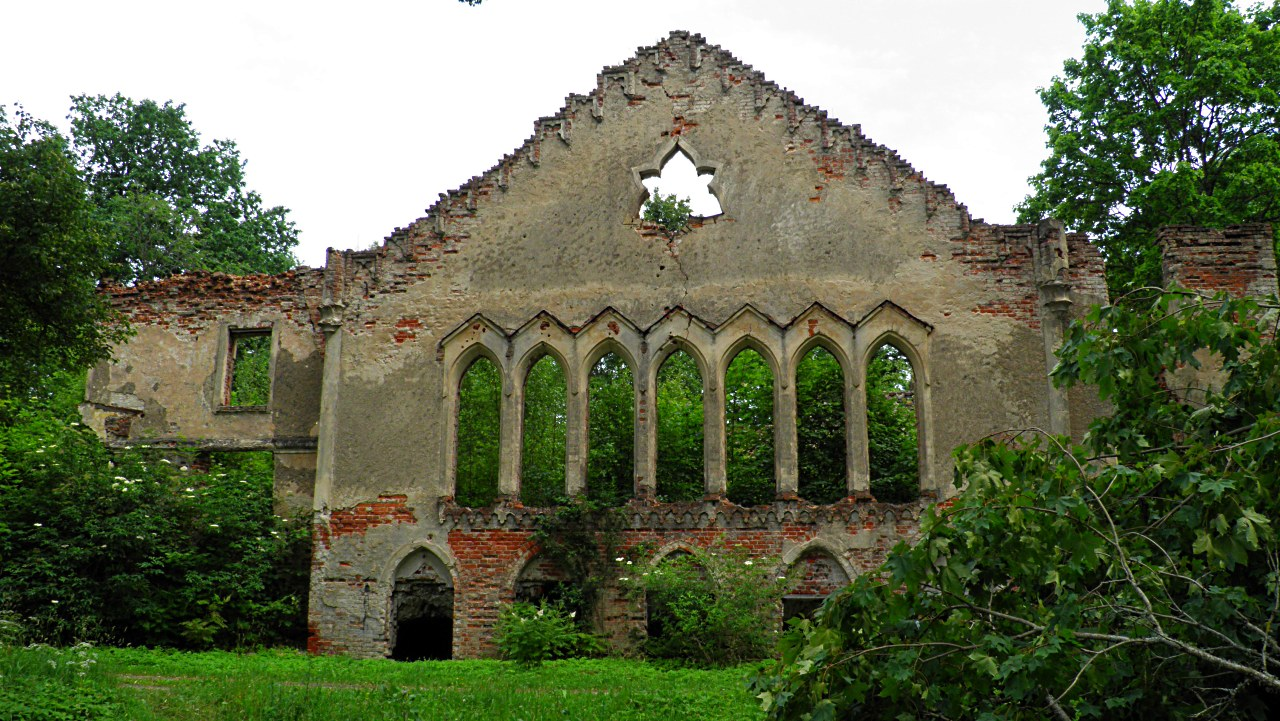

Site information
- Type: Manor
- Open to the public: yes
- Condition: Ruins

Location
- Coordinates: 56°7′1.5″N 25°53′4.9″E

Site history
- Built: 1749
- Demolished: 1926

Asare Manor (Latvian: Asares muiža) is a manor house built in 1749 in the Asare Parish of Aknīste Municipality, in the Selonia region of Latvia. The house was built in 1749, rebuilt in the 19th century in Neo-Gothic style, and burned down in 1926. During the Latvian agrarian reforms in 1920, the manor house was nationalized and lands partitioned. Prior to reform manor belonged to the Walther-Wittenheim family. Currently only impressive ruins remain.

== See also ==
- List of palaces and manor houses in Latvia
