= Dviete =

Village in Latvia

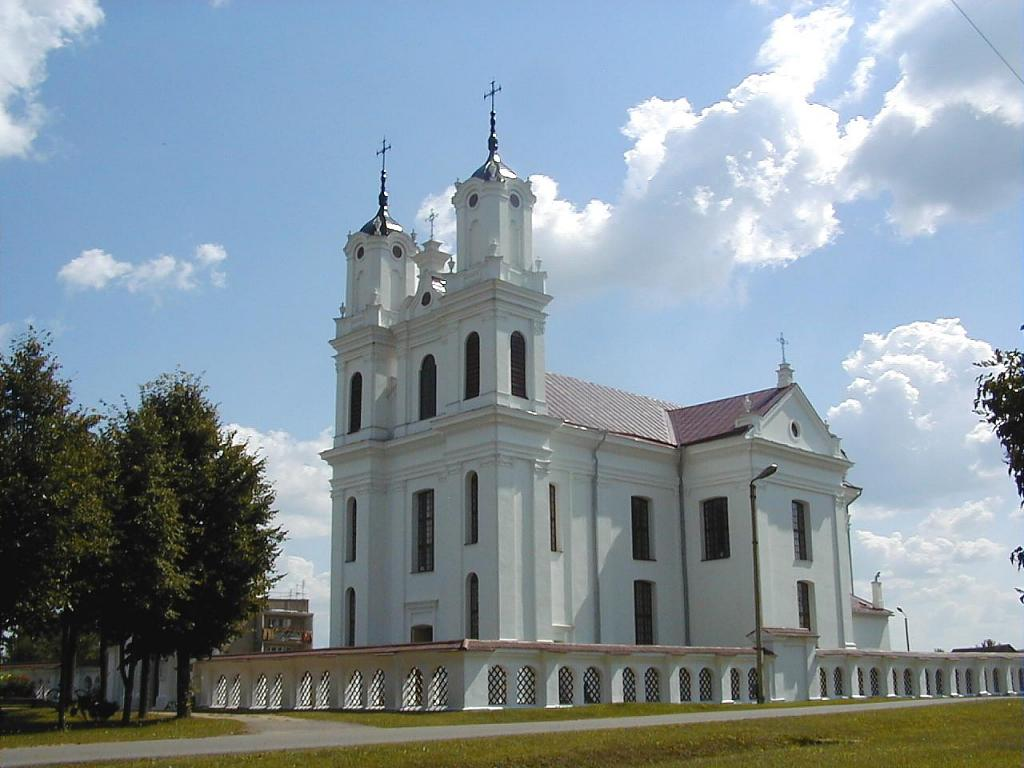
- Catholic church in Dviete

- Location within Latvia
- Coordinates: 56°3′23″N 26°17′18″E
- Country: Latvia
- Municipality: Augšdaugava Municipality

Population (2010)
  - Total: 476
- Time zone: UTC+2 (EET)
  - Summer (DST): UTC+3 (EEST)

Dviete (Latvian: Dviete; Latgalian: Dvīts; Polish: Dwete) is a settlement in the Dviete Parish of Augšdaugava Municipality in the Selonia region of Latvia.
