= Gārsene Manor =

Manor house in Latvia

Coordinates: 56°06′02″N 25°48′32″E

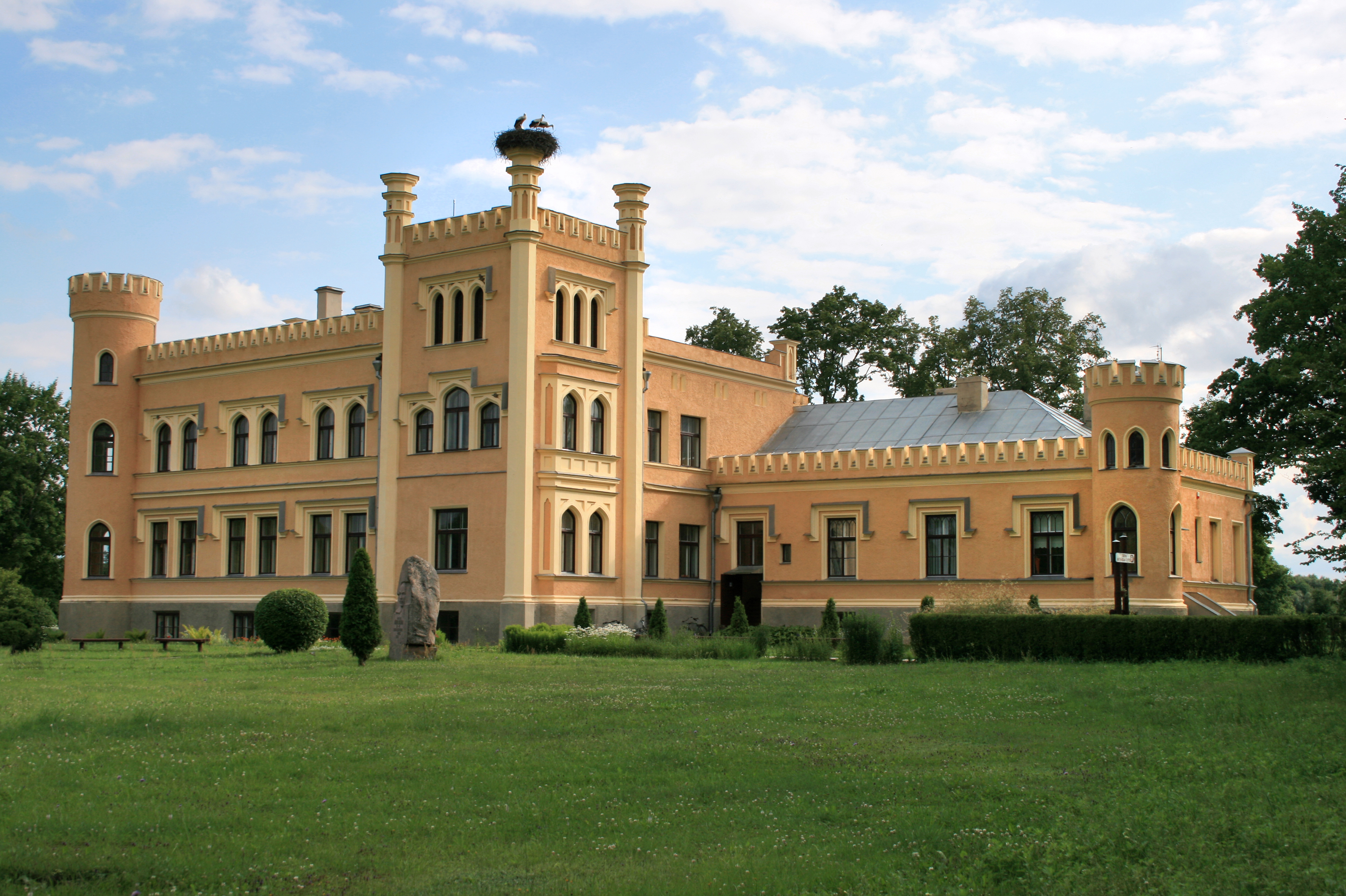
- Interactive map of the Gārsene Manor area

General information
- Architectural style: Neo-Gothic
- Location: Jēkabpils Municipality, Latvia
- Construction started: 1856
- Completed: 1860
- Client: von Budberg family

Gārsene Manor is a Neo-Gothic manor house located in Gārsene Parish, Jēkabpils Municipality in the Selonia region of Latvia. The palace houses a museum where visitors can view an exhibition about the Baltic-German von Budberg family.

== History ==
Gārsene manor was built in Neo-Gothic style for the von Budberg family around 1856 next to a rectangular courtyard. The two-story portion of the manor was built first, with a single story wing added in 1885. The family owned the manor until the Latvian agrarian reforms in the 1920s. In 1939, the building was rebuilt after the project of the school architect Vassiliev, and since 1940 it is part of the Gārsene local elementary school.

An 18th-century mill on the estate was remodeled with a Neo-Gothic façade in the second half of the 19th century. There is also a wide landscape park with ponds and decorative bridges adjacent to the manor. There are thirty different attractions for the visitors to see, one of which leads to the baronial family resting place, which is located adjacent to the mill.

Gārsene Manor is located beyond the estate gate posts. Farm buildings are grouped around the front courtyard, there being next to the manor an old barn and stables with an arcade porch. The manor complex also has a brewery, laborers' residence and servants' quarters.

== See also ==
- List of palaces and manor houses in Latvia
