= List of windmills in Belarus =

A list of traditional windmills in Belarus.

Location	Name of mill and coordinates	Type	Built	Notes	Photograph
Aśniežycy		Post			
Čareja		Tower			
Chutar		Smock			
Dudzičy	53°35′48″N 27°40′22″E	Smock			
Haradnaja		Smock			
Hirsk		Post			
Hluša		Post			
Jakimava Słabada		Smock			
Kaliadzičy	52°38′16″N 24°33′15″E	Post			
Kazły		Post			
Krotava		Post			
Lida		Smock			
Moĺča		Smock			
Motal		Post			
Padlipcy		Post			
Pieršamajsk		Post			
Pružany	(Four mills)	Post			
Šajki	52°53′20″N 26°34′16″E	Smock			
Sitsitsk		Smock			
Stałovičy		Post			
Stročyca	State Museum of Folk Architecture and Life	Post		Moved from Damatkanavičy	
Stročyca	State Museum of Folk Architecture and Life	Post		Moved from Janušaŭka	
Stročyca		Smock			
Stroczycy		Post			
Turec		Post			
Urviedź		Post			
Vujvičy		Smock			
