= Eduard Nižňanský =

Slovak historian

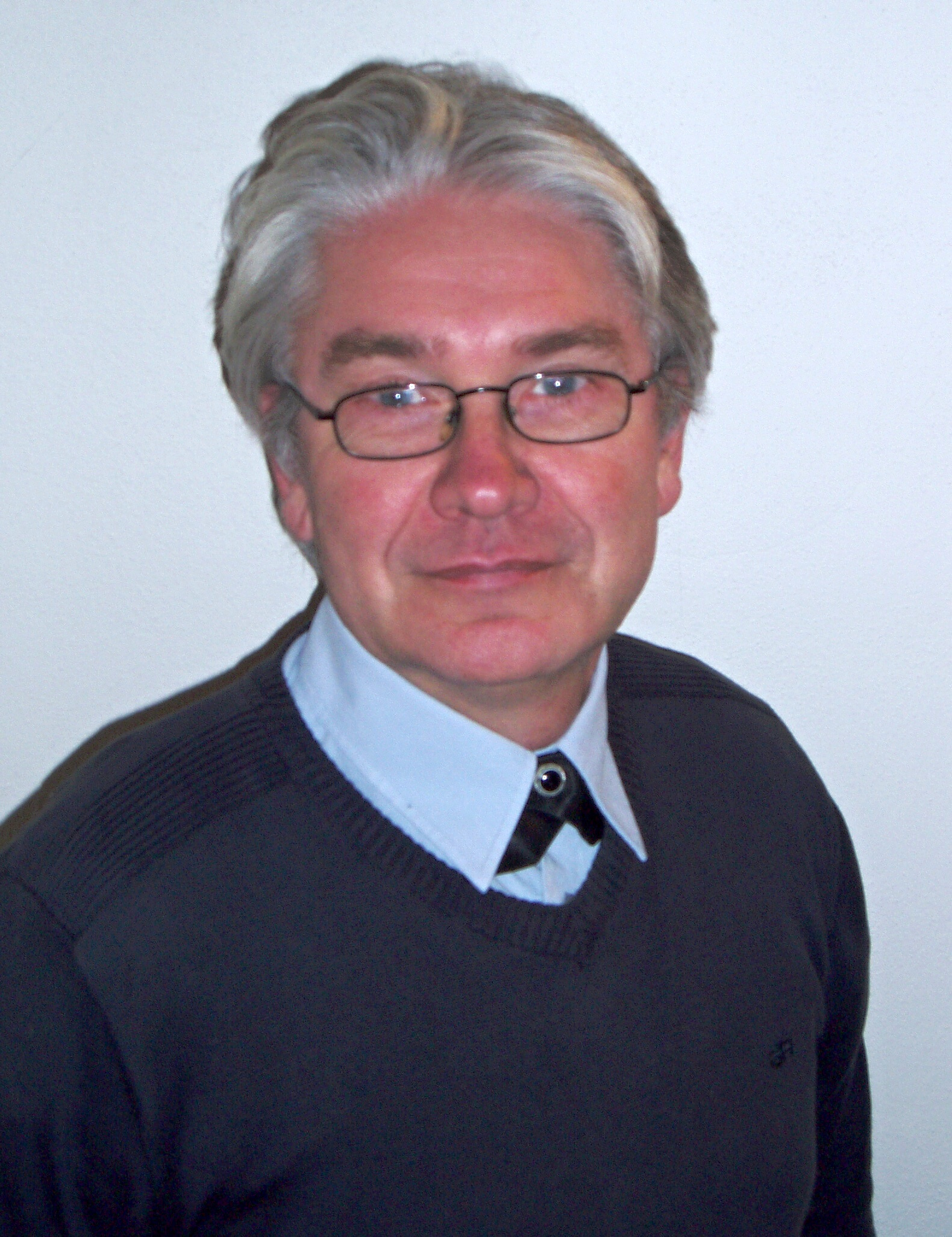
- Born: 21 July 1955 (age 71); Martin, Czechoslovakia
- Occupation: Historian

Academic work
- Sub-discipline: The Slovak State and the Holocaust in Slovakia
- Institutions: Faculty of Arts, Comenius University

Eduard Nižňanský (born 21 July 1955 in Martin) is a Slovak historian who specializes in the study of the Slovak State and the Holocaust in Slovakia. Since 2002, he has worked for the Faculty of Arts, Comenius University in Bratislava.

== Works ==
- Nižňanský, Eduard (1999). Židovská komunita na Slovensku medzi československou parlamentnou demokraciou a slovenským štátom v stredoeurópskom kontexte [The Jewish Community in Slovakia between Czechoslovak Parliamentary Democracy and the Slovak State in the Central European Context] (in Slovak). Prešov: Universum. ISBN 978-80-967753-3-0.
- Nižňanský, Eduard (2005). Holokaust na Slovensku: vzťah slovenskej majority a židovskej minority : náčrt problému. Vol. 2, 7. Bratislava: Nadacia Milana Simecku. ISBN 978-80-969242-4-0.
- Hlavinka, Ján; Nižňanský, Eduard (2010). Pracovný a koncentračný tábor v Seredi 1941-1945 (in Slovak). Bratislava: DSH, Dokumentačné Stredisko Holokaustu. ISBN 978-80-969857-3-9.
- Nižňanský, Eduard (2010). Nacizmus, holokaust, slovenský štát [Nazism, Holocaust, Slovak State] (in Slovak). Kalligram. ISBN 978-80-8101-396-6.
- Kaiserova, Kristina; Nižňanský, Eduard; Schulze Wessel, Martin (2015). Religion und Nation Tschechen, Deutsche und Slowaken im 20. Jahrhundert (in German). Klartext. ISBN 978-3-8375-1286-1.
- Nižnanský, Eduard (2016). Obraz nepriatel'a v propagande počas II. svetovej vojny na Slovensku (in Slovak). Banská Bystrica: Múzeum Slovenského národného povstania. ISBN 978-80-89514-41-0.
- Nižňanský, Eduard (2016). Politika antisemitizmu a holokaust na Slovensku v rokoch 1938-1945 (in Slovak). Múzeum Slovenského Národného Povstania. ISBN 978-80-89514-40-3.
