= List of windmills in Canada =

This is a list of windmills in Canada. Windmills feature uniquely in the history of New France particularly, where they were used as strong points in fortifications.

== Alberta ==
| Location | Name of mill | Type | Built | Notes | Photograph |
|---|---|---|---|---|---|
| Calgary | Bruderheim Windmill | Smock | 1920 | Located in Heritage Park Historical Village open-air museum. | |
| Dead Man's Flats | | Smock | | | |
| Edmonton | Fort Edmonton Park Mill | Smock | | Located in Fort Edmonton Park open-air museum. | |
| Etzikom | Etzikom Mill | Post | | | |

== British Columbia ==
| Location | Name of mill | Type | Built | Notes | Photograph |
|---|---|---|---|---|---|
| Richmond | Fantasy Gardens | Smock | | | |

== Manitoba ==
| Location | Name of mill | Type | Built | Notes | Photograph |
|---|---|---|---|---|---|
| Arborg | | Smock | | | |
| Holland | | Smock | | | |
| Mennonite Heritage Village | | Smock | 1972 | Burnt down 2000 | |
| Portage La Prairie | | Smock | | | |
| Rat River Mennonite Reservation | | Smock | | | |

== Ontario ==
| Location | Name of mill | Type | Built | Notes | Photograph |
|---|---|---|---|---|---|
| Adolphustown | | | | | |
| Bayfield | Folmar Mill | Smock | | Saw and grist mill. | |
| Guelph | Riverside Park Mill | Smock | 1977 | | |
| Maitland River | George Longley Mill | Tower | | | |
| Prescott | Windmill Point Mill | Tower | 1832 | Converted to lighthouse in 1872. | |
| Thunder Bay | Thunder Bay Mill | Smock | | | |
| Windsor | Sandwich Windmill | Smock | 1992 | | |
