= Dviete Parish =

Parish of Latvia

- parish of Latvia
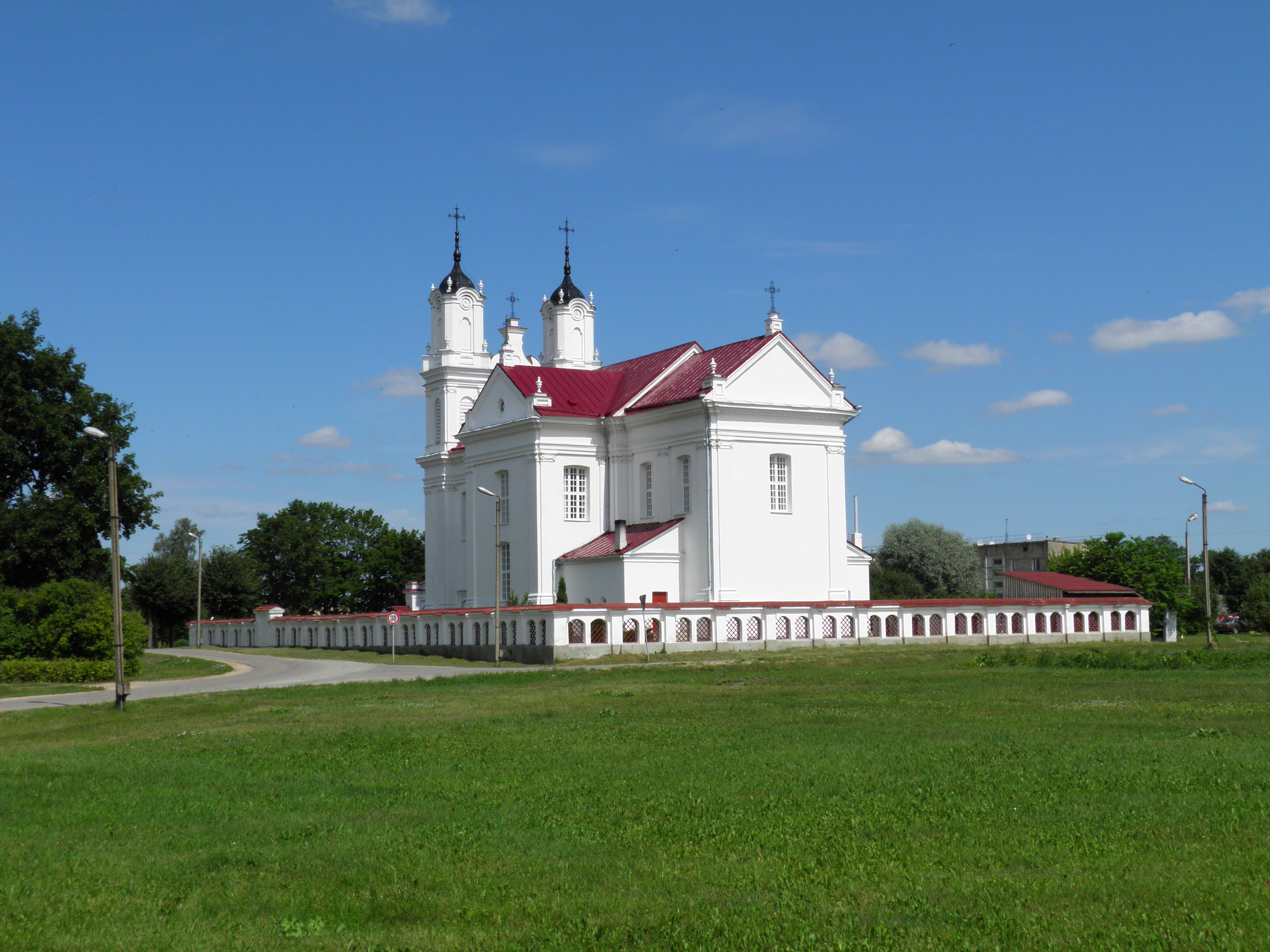

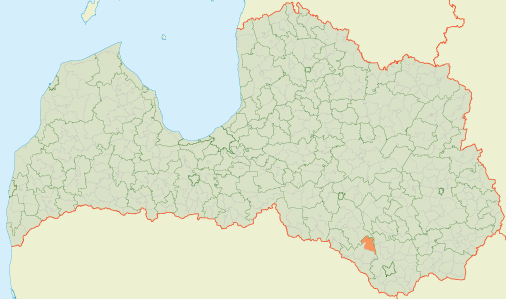
- Coordinates: 56°06′17″N 26°15′24″E
- Country: Latvia

Population (1 January 2026)
  - Total: 416

Dviete Parish (Latvian: Dvietes pagasts) is an administrative unit of Augšdaugava Municipality in the Selonia region of Latvia (Prior to the 2009 administrative reforms it was part of Daugavpils district).

== Towns, villages and settlements of Dviete Parish ==
- Dviete
