= List of windmills in Australia =

A list of traditional windmills in Australia.

== Locations ==
=== New South Wales ===
Location	Name of mill and coordinates	Type	Built	Notes	Photograph
Appin	Larkin's Mill	Post	1846	Windmill World	
Cattai	Arndell's Mill	Tower	c.1809	Windmill World	
Darlinghurst, Sydney	Barker's Mill; Hope Mill	Tower		Windmill World	
Darlinghurst, Sydney	Clarkson's Mill	Tower		Windmill World	
Darlinghurst, Sydney	Girard's Mill	Tower		Windmill World	
Darlinghurst, Sydney	Hyndes' Mill; Craigend Mill; Hill's Mill; Jenkins' Mill	Tower		Windmill World	
Gilead	Mount Gilead Mill; Rose's Mill	Tower	1836	Windmill World	
Millers Point, Sydney	Underwood's Mill	Tower		Windmill World	
Millers Point, Sydney		Post			
Nimmitabel	Geldmacher's Mill	Tower	1872	Windmill World	
Paddington, Sydney	Gordon's Mill	Post		Windmill World	
Parramatta	Howell's Mill	Smock		Combined windmill and tide mill Windmill World	
Port Macquarie		Smock		Windmill World	
Singleton	Rosemount	Post		Windmill World	
Somersby	Government Windmill, Old Sydney Town	Tower	1981	Windmill World	
Sydney	Boston's Mill	Tower		Windmill World	
Sydney	Government Mill (First); Fort Phillip	Tower			
Sydney	Government Mill (Second); Military Mill	Tower			
Sydney	Kable's Mill; Lucas' Mill	Post	1805	Windmill World	
Sydney	Palmer's Mill	Tower		Windmill World	
Urana	Coonong Horizontal Windmill	Horizontal	1885	Dexter Turbine windpump Windmill World	
Waverley, Sydney	Hough's Mill	Post		Windmill World	

=== Norfolk Island ===
Location	Name of mill and coordinates	Type	Built	Notes	Photograph
Kingston	Kingston Mill	Post	1842-43	Windmill World	

=== Queensland ===
Location	Name of mill and coordinates	Type	Built	Notes	Photograph
Brisbane	The Old Windmill	Tower	1828	Windmill World	

=== South Australia ===
Location	Name of mill and coordinates	Type	Built	Notes	Photograph
Adelaide	City Mill	Smock			
Adelaide	West Terrace Mill	Tower			
Hay Valley	Dunn's Mill	Smock	1842	Windmill World	
Mount Barker (Hahndorf)	Nixon's Mill	Tower	1842	Windmill World	
Port Lincoln	Old Mill	Tower	1846	Windmill World	
Victor Harbor	Old Mill	Tower	1851	Windmill World	

=== Tasmania ===
Location	Name of mill and coordinates	Type	Built	Notes	Photograph
Battery Point	Luckman's Mill	Tower		Windmill World	
Brighton	Brighton Mill	Post			
Launceston	Penny Royal Windmill	Tower	1978	Windmill World	
Maria Island	Darlington Mill	Post		Windmill World	
Oatlands	Callington Mill	Tower	1837	Restored 2010	
Richmond	Trafalgar Mill	Tower		Windmill World	
Rokeby	Stanfield's Mill	Post		Windmill World	
Sorell	Downward's Mill	Post		Windmill World	

=== Victoria ===
Location	Name of mill and coordinates	Type	Built	Notes	Photograph
Baxter	Westerfield	Smock	1925	For generating electricity Windmill World	
Kyneton	Greenhill Windmill	Tower	1856	National Trust Register	
Warrnambool	Lyndoch	Smock		Open framed smock mill Windmill World	

=== Western Australia ===
Location	Name of mill and coordinates	Type	Built	Notes	Photograph
Amelup	The Lily	Tower	1997	Inspired by Molen de Lelie, Puttershoek; Windmill World	
South Perth	Old Mill; Shenton's Mill	Tower	1835		
South Yunderup	Cooper's Mill	Tower	1847	Windmill World	
Wonnerup	Chapman's Mill	Tower	1850	Windmill World	
York	Solomon Cook's Mill	Tower	1850	Standing in 1877.	

== Notes ==
Names in bold denote surviving windmills. Known building dates are in bold text. Non-bold text denotes first known date. Unless otherwise stated, the reference for all entries is the linked Windmill World webpage.
