= Holíč =

- Municipality
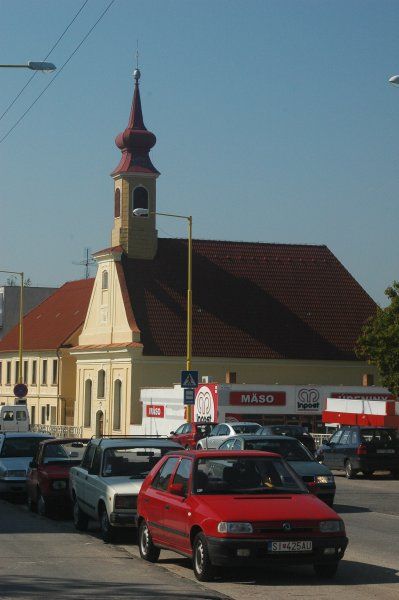

- Flag Coat of arms

- Location of Holíč in the Trnava Region Location of Holíč in Slovakia
- Coordinates: 48.81°N 17.16°E
- Country: Slovakia
- Region: Trnava Region
- District: Skalica District
- First mentioned: 1217

Government
  - Mayor: Zdenko Čambal

Area
  - Total: 34.82 km^{2} (13.44 sq mi)
- Elevation: 180 m (590 ft)

Population (2025)
  - Total: 10,735
- Time zone: UTC+1 (CET)
  - Summer (DST): UTC+2 (CEST)
- Postal code: 908 51
- Area code: +421 34
- Vehicle registration plate (until 2022): SI
- Website: www.holic.sk

Holíč (until 1946 "Holič", German: Weißkirchen (an der March) / Holitsch, Hungarian: Holics) is a town in western Slovakia.

== History ==
The oldest archaeological findings in the area date from the Neolithic, and there are findings from the Bronze Age, Iron Age and the Roman time. The town was first mentioned in 1205 as Wywar, meaning "New Castle". The Árpád dynasty built a stone castle after the Mongol invasion in 1241. From the 13th century until 1296, Holíč was the seat of a border comitatus. Among the owners of the town were Matthias Csák and Stibor of Stiborice. In the 15th century the town's development was slowed by the Hussite raids. In 1736 the town was bought by Franz I, Holy Roman Emperor, husband of Maria Theresa and manufactures were built, leading to the town's growth. Maria Theresa also rebuilt the Holíč Castle from a fortress into a summer château of the Habsburgs. Holíč's once thriving Jewish community was completely decimated by the Holocaust.

Holíč also gives its name to a type of tin-glazed earthenware faience that was manufactured in the area. The Holitsch factory (Slovakia) was founded in 1743 by Francis of Lorainne, consort of Empress Maria Teresia. The factory concentrated on the production of richly adorned sets intended to emulate the wares used by the aristocracy in the large western European centers. The factory, which served as a revitalizing force against the decline of local potters in the 18th century, brought together experts from different countries in a co-operative effort to produce wares from which later central European factories derived their inspiration. Responding to an eager market and following patterns established at the Strasbourg factory, the Holitsch factory produced remarkably life-like pieces imitating fruits and vegetables. These fine examples of modeling were further distinguished by the brightness of the colors used in their decorations. The potters also created sculpture vessels of human or animal shapes that were intended for a practical as well as decorative use such as salt dishes, parrot bottles, and lidded containers.

In August 1942, President Jozef Tiso gave an infamous speech in the town in which he defended the deportation of Jews from Slovakia, because they were "parasites".

== Geography ==
The municipality lies at an altitude of 180 metres (590 ft) and covers an area of 34.82 km^{2} (13.44 sq mi) (2025).

It is located in the Záhorie region near the Morava River, 6 kilometres (4 mi) away from the Czech city of Hodonín and around 85 kilometres (53 mi) from Bratislava.

== Population ==
Historical population
Year	Pop.	±%
1970	7,570	—
1980	8,741	+15.5%
1991	11,359	+30.0%
2001	11,416	+0.5%
2011	11,255	−1.4%
2021	11,214	−0.4%
Source: Censuses

Population statistic (10 years)
Year	1995	2005	2015	2025
Count	11,339	11,627	11,162	10,735
Difference		+2.53%	−3.99%	−3.82%

Population statistic
Year	2024	2025
Count	10,858	10,735
Difference		−1.13%

It has a population of 10,735 people (31 December 2025).

=== Ethnicity ===
Census 2021 (1+ %)
Ethnicity	Number	Fraction
Slovak	10,121	90.25%
Not found out	781	6.96%
Czech	334	2.97%
Total	11,214	

In year 2021 was 11,214 people by ethnicity 10,121 as Slovak, 781 as Not found out, 334 as Czech, 80 as Ukrainian, 73 as Romani, 30 as Other, 23 as Moravian, 19 as Russian, 17 as Romanian, 17 as Hungarian, 14 as Rusyn, 9 as Polish, 4 as Chinese, 3 as Vietnamese, 3 as Italian, 3 as Bulgarian, 2 as German, 2 as English, 1 as Serbian, 1 as Canadian, 1 as Croatian and 1 as Albanian.

Note on population: The difference values of population numbers in the table "Population statistic" and in the sections "Ethnicity" & "Religion" is caused by the use of various statistical methods.

=== Religion ===
Census 2021 (1+ %)
Religion	Number	Fraction
Roman Catholic Church	5306	47.32%
None	4030	35.94%
Not found out	1084	9.67%
Evangelical Church	461	4.11%
Total	11,214	

In year 2021 was 11,214 people by religion 5306 from Roman Catholic Church, 4030 from None, 1084 from Not found out, 461 from Evangelical Church, 107 from Eastern Orthodox Church, 51 from Ad hoc movements, 49 from Christian Congregations in Slovakia, 33 from Greek Catholic Church, 20 from Jehovah's Witnesses, 20 from Other, 12 from Buddhism, 9 from Other and not ascertained christian church, 6 from Calvinist Church, 5 from United Methodist Church, 4 from Apostolic Church, 3 from Paganism and natural spirituality, 3 from Islam, 3 from Hinduism, 2 from Czechoslovak Hussite Church, 1 from Jewish community, 1 from Old Catholic Church, 1 from New Apostolic Church, 1 from Seventh-day Adventist Church, 1 from Church of Jesus Christ of Latter-day Saints and 1 from Baptists Church.

== Sights ==
- Holíč Castle, now a baroque château
- Gothic church from 1387
- Capuchin church from 1755
- Tolerantion church from 1787
- Burgher house, originally in Baroque, now in Art Nouveau style
- Complex of manufacture buildings
- Water and wind mills
- Loretan and Florian chapels
- Holíč Menhir

In the neighbouring village of Kopčany, the 9th century St. Margaret's Church from the time of Great Moravia, is located.

== Twin towns — sister cities ==
Holíč is twinned with:

- Hodonín, Czech Republic
- Hollabrunn, Austria
- Hlozany, Serbia
- Maloyaroslavets, Russia

== See also ==
- List of municipalities and towns in Slovakia
- Holíč Castle

== Genealogical resources ==
The records for genealogical research are available at the state archive "Statny Archiv in Bratislava, Slovakia"

- Roman Catholic church records (births/marriages/deaths): 1678–1922 (parish A)
- Lutheran church records (births/marriages/deaths): 1786–1895 (parish A)
