= Incourt, Belgium =

Municipality in Walloon Brabant province, Wallonia, Belgium

Incourt
- Municipality
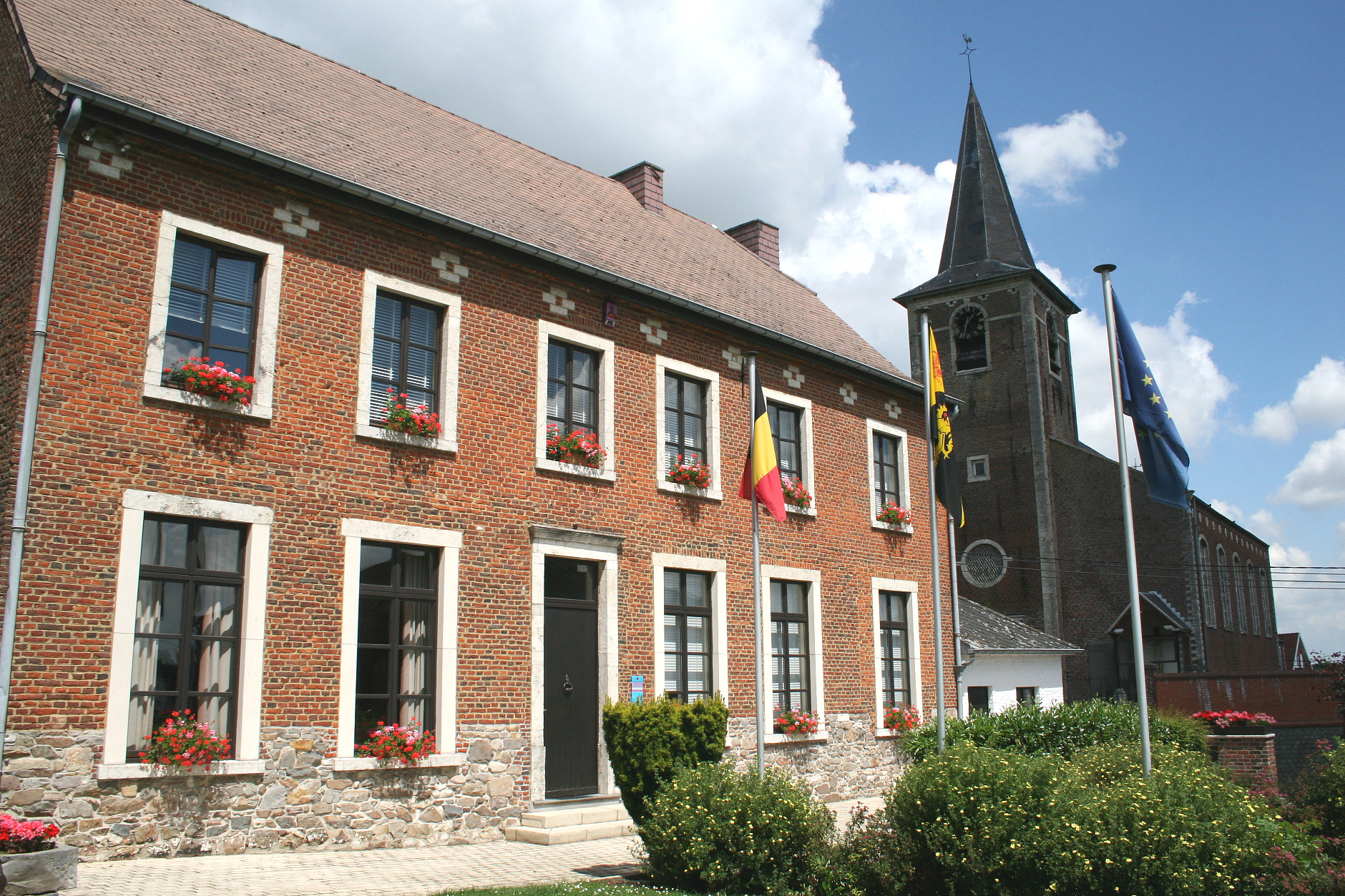
- Town hall and St. Peter's church

- Flag Coat of arms

- The municipality of Incourt in Walloon Brabant
- Interactive map of Incourt
- Location in Belgium
- Coordinates: 50°42′N 04°47′E
- Country: Belgium
- Community: French Community
- Region: Wallonia
- Province: Walloon Brabant
- Arrondissement: Nivelles

Government
  - Mayor: Benoît Malevé (PS)
  - Governing party: EPI

Area
  - Total: 38.91 km^{2} (15.02 sq mi)

Population (2024-01-01)
  - Total: 5,662
  - Density: 145.5/km^{2} (376.9/sq mi)
- Postal codes: 1315
- NIS code: 25043
- Area codes: 010
- Website: www.incourt.be

Incourt (French pronunciation: [ɛ̃kuʁ]; Walloon: Incoû) is a municipality of Wallonia located in the Belgian province of Walloon Brabant. On January 1, 2006, Incourt had a total population of 4,585. The total area is 38.79 km² which gives a population density of 118 inhabitants per km².

The municipality contains, besides Incourt itself, the sections of Glimes, Opprebais, Piétrebais, Sart-Risbart and Roux-Miroir.
