= Asare =

Asare is a surname. Notable people with the name include:

- Abena Oppong-Asare (born 1984), British Labour Party politician
- Bediako Asare, Ghanaian journalist and writer
- Isaac Asare (born 1974), Ghanaian footballer
- Jermaine Asare (born 1983), Welsh boxer
- Jones Kusi-Asare (born 1980), Swedish-Ghanaian footballer
- Kwabena Asare (born 1992), Canadian football player
- Meshack Asare (born 1945), Ghanaian writer
- Patrick Asare (born 1995), Ghanaian footballer
- Nana Akwasi Asare (born 1986), Ghanaian footballer
- Samuel Asare Konadu (or Asare Konadu) (1932–1994), Ghanaian journalist, writer and publisher
- Nsiah Asare, Ghanaian physician
- Theodore Obo Asare Jnr (1926–1944), Ghanaian Economist and politician
- Yaw Asare (1954–2002), Ghanaian academic, playwright, dramatist and director
