= Saulcerīte Viese =

Latvian writer and literary scholar

Saulcerīte Viese (2 August 1932 in Jēkabpils – 24 December 2004 in Riga) was a Latvian writer and literary scholar. She received the Order of the Three Stars in 1995.

== Biography ==
Born on 2 August 1932 in Jēkabpils. Graduated from the Faculty of History and Philology of the University of Latvia in 1955, began publishing her works in 1958. Worked at the Rainis Museum of Literature and Art History (1955–1973), publishing house "Liesma" (1973–1978).

From 1978 to 1990, Viese headed the Latvian Writers' Union's Mežaparks Development Society. She wrote short fiction books, research papers, compiled Rainis' yearbooks between 1975 and 1989, as well as the first six Copied Writings of Aspazija (1985–1988). During the Awakening Movement in 1989, she was included on the list of intellectuals to be isolated.

She died on 24 December 2004 in Riga.

== Works ==
=== Books ===
- Aspazija (1975)
- Jaunais Rainis: ieskats mazpazīstamos manuskriptos (1982)
- Krišjānis Barons, the man and his work (1985; translated to English by Tāmāra Zalīte)
- Pie sliekšn̦a, pie avota (1989)
- Gājēji uz mēnessdārzu (1990)
- Dieviena : novada eps (1994)
- Mežaparks : pilsēta priežu silā (2001)
- Mūžīgie spārni : stāstījums par Aspazijas dzīvi (2004)
