= Military of the Swedish Empire =

Swedish Imperial Army
- Svenska Stormaktens Armé
- Royal coat of arms of the early Swedish Empire
- Founded: 1611
- Current form: Swedish Armed Forces
- Disbanded: 1721
- Service branches: Swedish Army; Swedish Navy
- Headquarters: Stockholm

Leadership
- Monarch: King Gustav II Adolf (1611–1632); Queen Christina (1632–1654); King Charles X Gustav (1654–1660); King Charles XI (1660–1697); King Charles XII (1697–1718)
- Field marshal: Johan Banér (1634–1641); Lennart Torstensson (1641–1646); Carl Gustaf Wrangel (1646–1676); Otto Wilhelm Königsmarck (1676–1685); Rutger von Ascheberg (1678–1693); Erik Dahlberg (1693–1702); Carl Gustav Rehnskiöld (1706–1721)
- Notable commanders: General Carl Gustaf Armfeldt; General Adam Ludwig Lewenhaupt

Personnel
- Military age: 16–60 years old
- Conscription: Yes
- Active personnel: 22,834 (1630); ~77,000 (1700)
- Reserve personnel: 127,166 (1630)
- Deployed personnel: 150,000 (Thirty Years' War); 200,000 (Great Northern War)

Industry
- Foreign suppliers: Brandenburg; England; France; United Provinces

From 1611 to 1721, Sweden was a European great power, becoming a dominant faction in the quest for control of the Baltic Sea and a formidable military power. During this period, known as Stormaktstiden ('The Great Power Era'), the Swedish Empire held a territory more than twice the size of its modern borders and one of the most successful military forces at the time, proving itself on numerous occasions on battlefields such as Wallhof, Narva, and Düna. The military of the Swedish empire is commonly (and wrongfully) recognized only as the Caroleans, which were in fact not in service until the late 17th century under Charles XI and his successor. The Swedish Empire and its modern military force was founded by Gustavus Adolphus, who inherited the throne in 1611 at age 17. He immediately reformed the common European military based on mercenaries to a professional national army. However, before completing his vision of conquering the Holy Roman Empire, the warrior king was killed in action in 1632. His daughter and successor did little to improve Sweden's military position and abdicated early, providing the Swedish Empire with a more warlike ruler. Charles X Gustav was only king for 5 years, but conquered large amounts of territory that still belong to Sweden today (including Blekinge, Bohuslän, Skåne, and Halland). His son Karl XI would further strengthen the army by introducing the Caroleans, which were also used by Karl XII in the Great Northern War.

However, despite great successes on the battlefield, an inadequate economy and limited manpower eventually led to the demise of the Swedish Empire, which ended its 110-year period as a great power in 1721.

== Military of Gustav II Adolf ==
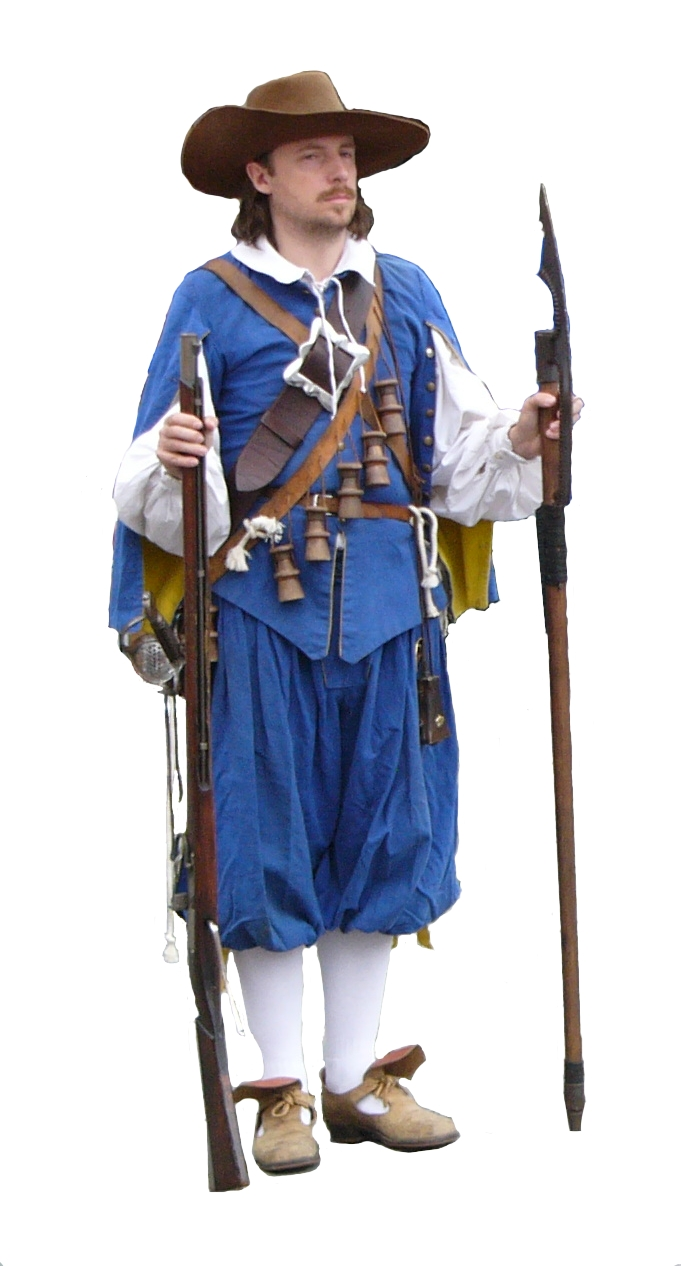
A reenactor displaying a Swedish soldier in the army of Gustavus Adolphus, armed with musket, bardiche and rapier

=== Background ===
Upon inheriting the Swedish throne in 1611, Gustav II Adolf (Gustavus Adolphus in Latin) also inherited three ongoing wars where Sweden was hopelessly outmatched by its wealthier neighbors. The young king saw the need of a strong military force if Sweden was to survive as a nation, and thus he began reforming the army with inspiration from the strategies used by Maurice of Nassau. To reach out to as many citizens as possible, Gustavus Adolphus gave the responsibility of conscription to the church, which would choose physically fit locals between the ages of 16 and 60. Not only did the church-based conscription enable a quicker and easier way to find able men of suitable age, but religious influence would strengthen the morale and unity of the Swedish troops compared to foreign mercenaries.

=== Organization ===
Gustav II Adolf also introduced a new regimental system, in which every province would be able to maintain one regiment of 3,264 men, divided in twelve companies of 272 men each. Four such regiments were to be active in mainland Sweden at all times (numbering 13,056 men), and another two regiments would be stationed in the eastern parts of the empire, giving Sweden a standing army of 19,584 men. Cavalry forces were organized in a similar fashion, with 13 companies (six Swedish, four Finnish and three noble), every company having 250 men and an equal number of horses (meaning that the Swedish army possessed 3,250 cavalrymen). While in military service, the provincial regiments were divided into field regiments of 1,176 men in eight companies of 147 men each – these comprised 21 officers, 54 pikemen and 72 musketeers. This system of field organization enabled small and mobile groups with high-quality leadership, excellent communication and unrivaled firepower. It is believed that the army of Gustav II Adolf was the first military to utilize effective combined arms tactics in renaissance history, and that the Swedish Empire was indeed the most successful fighting force of the Thirty Years' War.

=== Equipment and tactics ===
The Swedish army at the beginning of the Thirty Years' War was equipped with state-of-the-art weaponry of domestic designs, including the leather cannon – a lightweight artillery piece that could fire at a fast rate and maneuver during the battle with only a handful of infantrymen (as opposed to the hostile artillery, which consisted almost entirely of enormous cannons that were very difficult to move even with horses). However, the cannon itself could quickly overheat and Gustavus had to rely on superior infantry and cavalry to defeat the Holy Roman Empire.

The common "gallop cavalry" were armed with broadswords and also equipped with one flintlock carbine and two flintlock pistols. The infantry varied in equipment, with the musketeers being armed with a flintlock musket, a rapier sword and a shortened spear, glaive, or partisan that would not exceed 2 meters in length. Pikemen were commonly equipped with pikes of 4 to 6 meters in length and a rapier or broadsword for close defense. It was not uncommon for soldiers to also wield daggers and short-range pistols, but this was a voluntary addition to the common armament. Any infantry officer would be armed with a sword and at least one pistol, but officers often decided to wield the same kind of spear/glaive/partisan that their soldiers used, in order to keep enemies at a distance with greater effect than a sword would. During the Thirty Years' War, hand grenades were a rare sight on the battlefield, but Sweden did possess at least one specialized grenadier company.

=== Navy ===
Denmark had always threatened Swedish naval dominance in the Baltic Sea, and even during the reign of a tactical genius such as Gustavus Adolphus, the Swedish navy remained somewhat inferior to their southern adversaries. The Vasa was built in a response to this, and was the most heavily armed warship of its time. But the Vasa did not pass its maiden voyage and sunk in 1628, leaving Sweden without its most powerful vessel and causing financial problems within the naval ministry. No expenses had been spared decorating the warship, and many tonnes of gold and bronze statues were now very difficult to salvage. Instead of relying on a naval power of his own, Gustavus sought to ally with the dominant Protestant naval powers in Europe (namely England and the Dutch Republic). But a strong navy was not considered important by the king – it was on land that the battles against Catholicism would be fought and not in the small Baltic Sea. The concept of Dominium Maris Baltici was not a primary goal for Sweden during the Thirty Years' War, as it was overshadowed by the struggle to protect Protestantism. Nevertheless, Sweden did possess a quite powerful naval force compared to most adversaries other than Denmark – the Polish–Lithuanian Commonwealth and the Holy Roman Empire both had inadequate naval forces to stop a Swedish landing of troops in northern Germany, and only Denmark was granted immunity against this.

=== Invading the Holy Roman Empire ===
The main challenge for Gustav II Adolf was to defend the Lutheran faith against the Catholics of the south (according to Swedish geography; "the south" was actually present-day Germany and Poland and should not be confused with today's southern Europe). To do this he realized that he had to defeat the Holy Roman Empire on the field of battle; this was the dominating Catholic state in Europe which had begun enforcing its faith upon small Protestant nations in Germany, most notably Sweden's ally of Pomerania. This action provoked Sweden to initiate an invasion, and after landing in allied territory the superior Swedish army easily defeated an Imperial force at Frankfurt one year after establishing a beachhead in northern Germany. Although the state of Magdeburg, one of Sweden's few allies in the region, were overwhelmed by an Imperial army and had their capital city burnt to the ground with its citizens slaughtered, this only served to make the Holy Roman army underestimate their adversaries, being crushed in the following battle of Werben by a less numerous Swedish force. But no truly decisive battle was fought until 17 September 1631, when the Swedish Royal Army supported by Protestant Saxony engaged an imperial army of 35,000 men at Breitenfeld, resulting in the destruction of roughly 70% of Tilly' army with fairly low casualties on the Swedish side.

Sweden's limited manpower meant that from early on, the army had to rely on a majority of foreign soldiers, mainly from Germany, but also from Scotland or England (at least until the beginning of the English civil war). In 1648, the Swedish army in Germany (commanded by Carl Gustaf Wrangel) nominally comprised 62,950 men of which 45,206 were Germans and 17,744 Swedes. In spite of this composition, the Swedish army was a coherent fighting force, well-disciplined and trained, and strictly led. Many foreign officers could attain high ranks, such as marshal Alexander Leslie, William of Saxe-Weimar, Bernard of Saxe-Weimar, Hans Christoff von Königsmarck or, later Otto Wilhelm Königsmarck and Bernhard of Baden-Durlach. During the thirty years war, as the Imperial army had defeated many Protestant states from 1618 to 1629, German Protestants increasingly looked to the king of Sweden as their main protector and many enlisted in his army. The Swedes could also easily pay foreign troops thanks to French subsidies. This policy continued in later wars.

The Swedish army peaked at 140,000 troops in 1632, the majority of the regulars being German recruits. However these troops were spread out so individual battles remained relatively small; the king's personal strike force was only 16,000 men at Mainz. In addition to Germans, about 30,000 mercenaries from Britain served in the Swedish army from 1631 to 1639, a large chunk of the 111,950 Britons who fought in the Holy Roman Empire between 1620 and 1644 (most of the rest fought with the French, Dutch, or Danish). Per Swedish military archives, around 150,000 Swedish and Finnish soldiers died in the 1621 to 1648 campaigns: 40,000 in the 1621–1629 in the Prussian and Livonian wars, and 110,000 in the 1635–1648 war in Germany. Wilson estimates that another 400,000 foreigners (mostly Germans) died in Swedish service in the period, as conscripts or mercenaries. These figures are considerable, considering that Sweden and Finland together only had a population of 1.2 million in 1620.

Finland was an integral part of Sweden during the Swedish Empire. At the time of the Thirty Years' War, Finns represented a significant part of the Swedish army. Roughly 2/5 from the infantry and 3/7 from the cavalry in the army were from Finland. They served in their own units which used Finnish as their main language. Commands were also given in Finnish. The Finnish cavalry in the Swedish army was called Hakkapeliitta after their battle cry "Hakkaa päälle!". Approximately 110,000 soldiers from Finland lost their lives serving the Swedish Empire between 1617–1721; taking into account the contemporary number of inhabitants in Finland, this is roughly equivalent to 1,000,000 20th century casualties.

== Reforms of Karl XI ==
=== Background ===
Although the new allotment system was created during the rule of Queen Kristina, it was not until the reign of Karl XI that the new system came into effect. After the bloody Scanian War, during which Sweden had suffered great casualties and the king soon realized that his army and navy was in need of change. Conscription was poorly organized and the soldiers were uneducated in survival, meaning that many died from attrition. Also, conscripts were not always disciplined enough to avoid atrocities against enemy civilians, most notably in Skåne. To fuel a new army, the king decided that the state would take control of land formerly belonging to noblemen while also adding a heavy taxation on the upper class; an action that would also give the king popular support among the lower classes. Between 1680–1682, the Swedish nobility lost more than half of their estates and riches. An absolute monarch, Karl XI met little meaningful opposition to his demands and in 1682 the new allotment system was in effect.

=== The Carolean Army ===
The Carolean Army
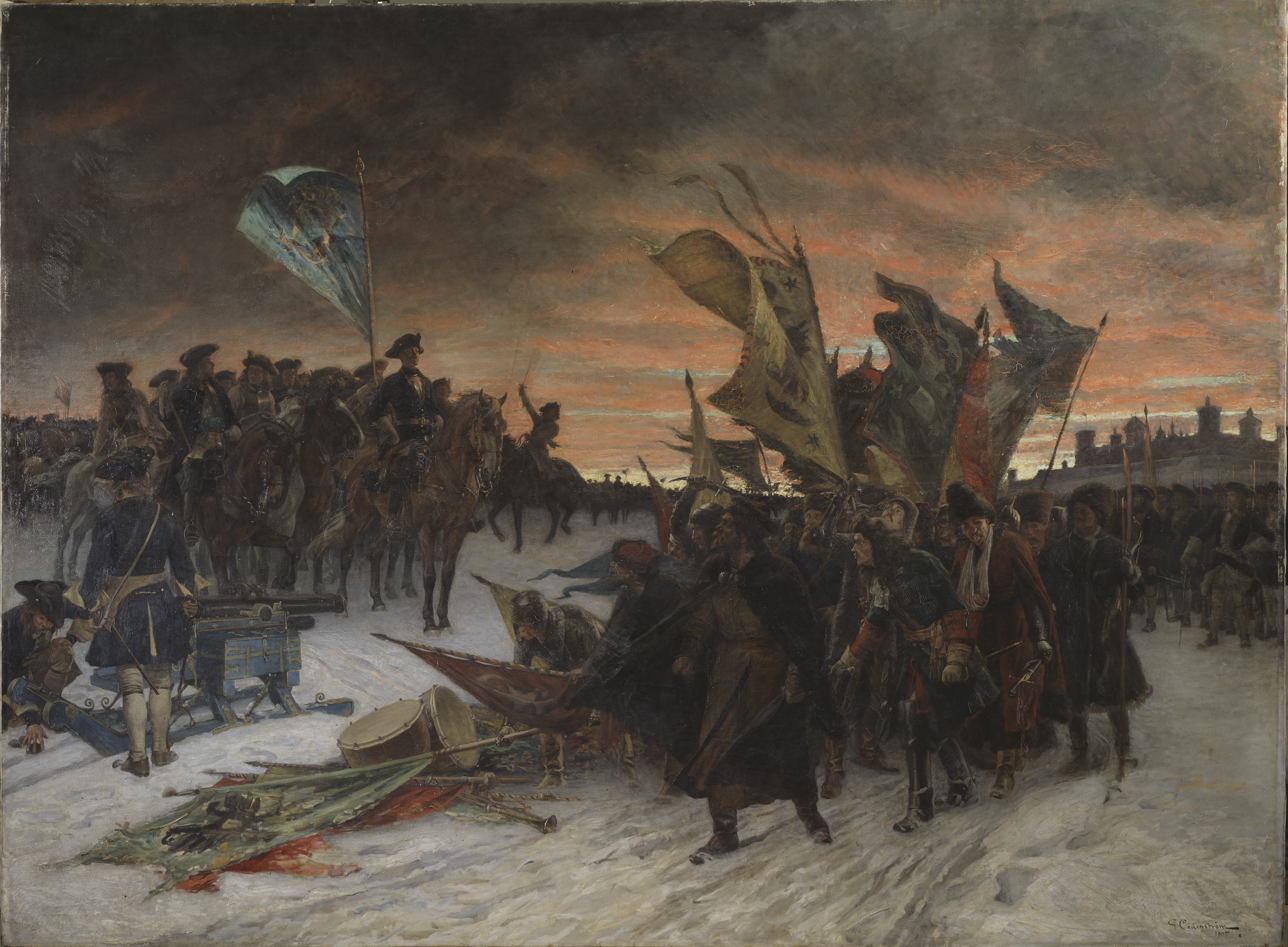
- Russian soldiers surrender themselves to a much smaller Carolean force after the Battle of Narva
- Leaders: Karl XI; Karl XII
- Dates active: 1682–1721
- Ideology: Lutheranism; Militarism; Monarchism; Swedish nationalism
- Part of: Military of Sweden
- Wars: War of the Grand Alliance and the Great Northern War

As the Swedish allotment system was completely introduced in 1682, the Swedish military saw significant change from the mercenaries of Gustavus Adolphus who were financed by looting, to a strictly Christian (in some areas fundamentalistic) fighting force. The soldiers were to pray every day, be respectful towards civilians, and were not allowed to display fear in battle. A soldier would be executed if he was found guilty of rape, interrupting a prayer or taking God's name in vain. The latter was considered the worst of all crimes, as religion was an important measure to keep morale and discipline high compared to an enemy force who fought simply because a human leader forced them into doing so. The Caroleans considered themselves specifically chosen by God to fight against eastern heretics and protect Christianity in Europe. Other crimes that would be harshly punished was drunkenness (50 lashes), stealing (35 lashes), absence during marching (25 lashes), questioning a commander (16 lashes), and absence after taps (5 lashes).

== Collapse of the Swedish Empire ==
=== General outline of the continental war ===
In the beginning of the Great Northern War in 1700, Karl XII proved himself a gifted military leader and won devastating victories over his enemies with relentless offensive tactics in battles such as Narva, Düna, Kliszów and Jakobstadt. In fact, the Swedish Army never lost a single major land battle until 1709. In the Dano-Swedish war of 1700 king Charles forced his adversaries to the southwest to abandon the conflict, and one year after that he launched a five-year campaign against Poland which saw the Commonwealth forced out of the conflict. Sweden saw no military failures in west or south, even though Russia had conducted some successful raids against Swedish outposts and villages on the eastern border. Charles XII's reputation as an invincible military commander would only end after he decided to launch a major campaign against Russia, known as the invasion of Russia. Once the army had reached as far as Poltava, Ukraine, Charles himself was wounded and his men were in a dreadful state, having not slept or eaten for days and lacking sufficient ammunition. Under the leadership of Field Marshal Carl Gustav Rehnskiöld the Caroleans desperately tried to overcome a heavily fortified line of defenses, but failed. The Russian army severely outnumbered the Swedish invaders, was in good condition, had a much larger artillery force and were heavily dug in behind lines of redoubts along with wooden stakes and trenches. The Battle of Poltava was a severe blow to the Carolean army. King Charles led his men to the southwest in the hopes of reaching his allies in the Ottoman Empire for support, but Swedish general Adam Ludwig Lewenhaupt ordered the surviving troops to lay down their arms when the Russian forces approached, much to the dismay of some soldiers and certainly to the king, Charles XII, who never forgave Lewenhaupt for his actions. The outcome of the events surrounding the disaster at Poltava effectively meant that Sweden had no land army left on continental Europe to contest renewed Russian attempts at reconquering their lost territories. Furthermore, the diplomatic situation for the Swedish Empire worsened significantly after Poltava - Denmark-Norway and the three nations of Saxony, Poland and Lithuania, all three ruled by one king, broke previous peace treaties (Traventhal 1700, and Altrandstädt 1706 respectively), meaning that, more or less, the nine years of previous warfare was undone. The situation would only become more dire for the Empire, as Prussia would later join the war in the summer of 1715, adding to the already long list of enemies for Sweden. The Ottoman Empire would also show unwilling to support the Swedish Empire, due to her inability to ship men down to the Ottoman Empire (via Poland).
