= Kūkas Parish =

Parish of Latvia

- parish of Latvia
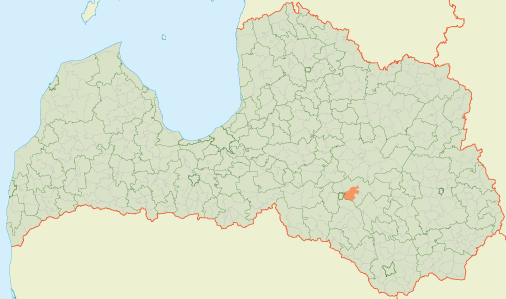
- Coordinates: 56°31′09″N 26°01′13″E
- Country: Latvia

Population (1 January 2026)
  - Total: 1,855

Kūkas Parish (Latvian: Kūku pagasts) is an administrative unit of Jēkabpils Municipality in the Latgale region of Latvia.

== Towns, villages and settlements of Kūkas parish ==
- Zīlāni
