= Caroleans =

Swedish soldiers of the Great Northern War

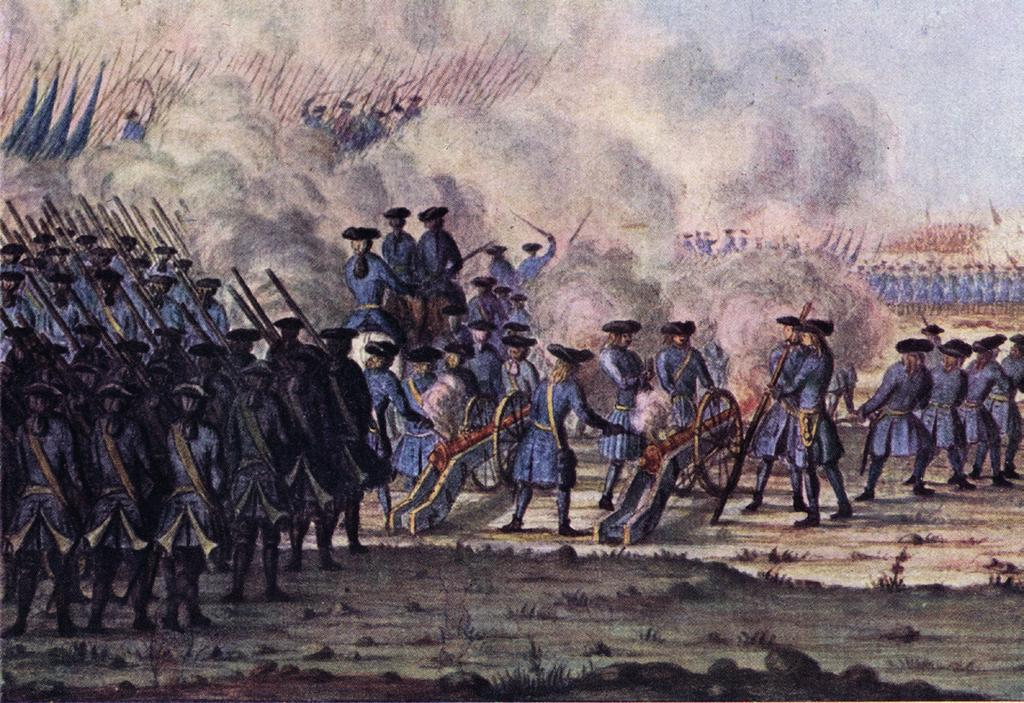
Contemporary depiction of Caroleans at the Battle of Gadebusch

Caroleans (Swedish: karoliner), from Carolus, the Latin form of the name Charles, is a term used to describe soldiers of the Swedish army during the reigns of Kings Charles XI and Charles XII of Sweden, and specifically from 1680, when Charles XI instituted an absolute monarchy and embarked on a series of sweeping military reforms, to the death of Charles XII in 1718.

The Caroleans are particularly associated with Charles XII and his campaigns in the Great Northern War (1700–1721), during which they achieved a series of impressive victories, often against considerably larger enemy forces, and established themselves as one of the most feared and respected armies in Europe. However, the main Swedish field army was almost entirely annihilated after defeat at the Battle of Poltava, and the war eventually ended in utter defeat and the dissolution of the Swedish Empire.

Overall, 350,000 soldiers from Sweden, Finland, and the Baltic provinces died in the service of Charles XII during the Great Northern War, mostly from non-combat causes. Two-thirds of these, or over 230,000, died in the years 1700 to 1709. These losses constituted an unusually large percentage of the pre-war population of 2.5 million. The losses of their enemies (principally Russia, Poland-Lithuania, Denmark-Norway and various northern German states) are known to have been even higher.

== Creation of the Carolean army ==
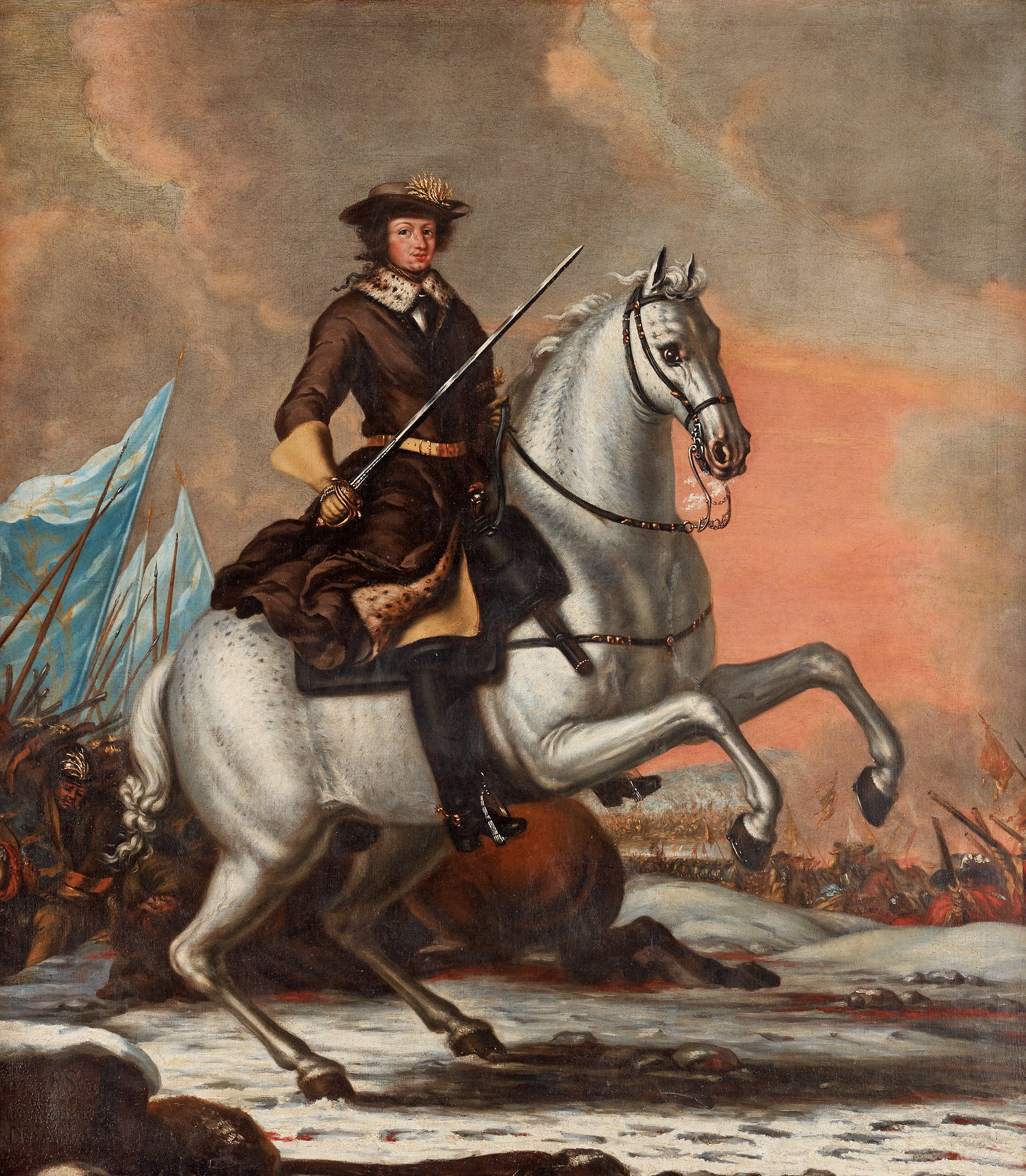
Karl XI, 1655–1697, king of Sweden by David Klöcker Ehrenstrahl

In the early and mid-seventeenth century, the Kingdom of Sweden established a large empire in the Baltic Sea region and Northern Germany. Its success rested in large part on the quality of its armed forces, which pioneered numerous innovations later adopted by other European armies and were well-organised and generally well-led. However, the military was allowed to go into decline during the early reign of Charles XI, when the king was a child and the country was directed by a council of regents led by Magnus Gabriel de la Gardie; many of the regents were openly corrupt, and embezzlement of royal revenues was widespread during this period.

The neglect of the armed forces almost led to disaster during the Scanian War (1675–9), when Sweden was invaded by Denmark-Norway. The attackers were eventually repulsed, but only after numerous setbacks and at the cost of appalling losses; indeed the 1676 Battle of Lund is widely reckoned to be the bloodiest battle ever fought in Scandinavia.

The travails of the Swedish army during the Scanian War convinced Charles, who was by now of age, that wholesale reform of the Swedish state was necessary in order to guarantee the security of the Swedish Empire. In 1680 he therefore instituted absolutism, overthrowing the previous system of semi-constitutional monarchy under the 1634 Instrument of Government, restored the royal finances by means of the so-called Great Reduction (confiscation of property embezzled by the aristocracy from the crown), and set about rebuilding the army, most notably through an overhaul of the allotment system.

=== New allotment system ===
Since the sixteenth century, the Swedish army had used the so-called allotment system (Swedish: indelningsverket; Finnish: ruotujakolaitos) to raise troops. In 1682, Charles completely reformed it, establishing what modern historians refer to as the "new allotment system" (Swedish: yngre indelningsverket).

Under the new system, Swedish farmers were to provide the crown with regiments of 1,000 or 1,200 men, complete with weapons and uniforms. Either independently or as rotes (groups) of no more than five, farmers would contract with the crown, with each rote providing and supporting one soldier, including giving the soldier a cottage and a garden plot. Each cavalryman was additionally provided with a horse. In exchange for these burdensome policies, each rote was granted a reduction in taxes.

The allotment system provided Charles XI with a professional army of 18,000 infantrymen and 8,000 cavalrymen. The system also provided for the deployment of 6,600 seamen, bolstering Sweden's navy. Adding to Sweden's numbers, Finland provided an additional 7,000 infantrymen, 3,000 cavalrymen, and 600 seamen.

== Equipment ==
=== Uniforms ===
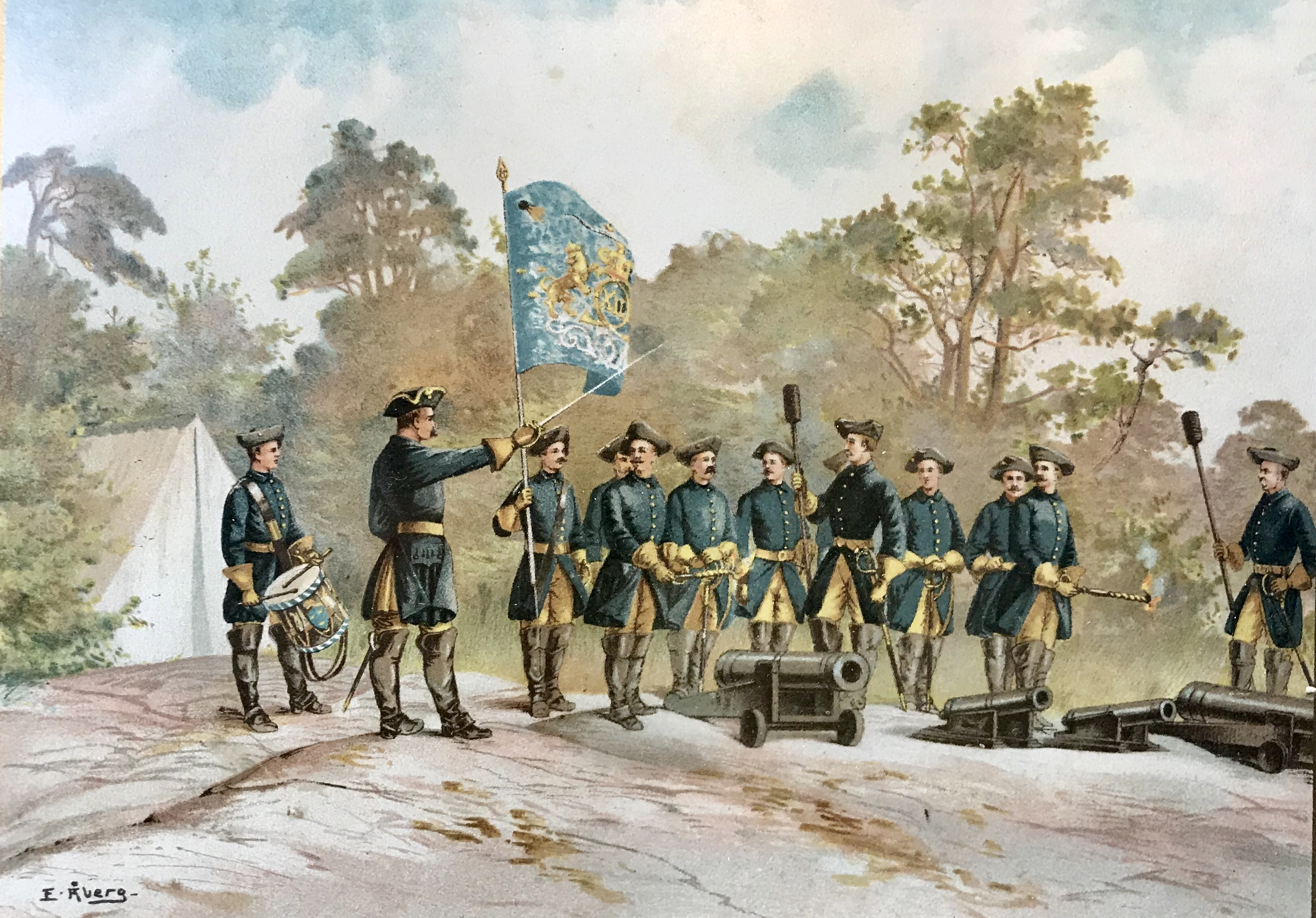
Depiction of Carolean artillerymen by Emil Åberg (1864–1940)

Carolean soldiers wore the Swedish Standard Uniform introduced by Charles XI—which featured blue great coats with yellow cuffs, white breeches, and yellow vests—with many regiments wearing variants thereof. For example, the dragoons of Bohuslän had green coats, and the regiment of Närke-Värmland had red cuffs. The artillery had grey coats with blue cuffs. As headgear, most Caroleans wore tricorne hats or a special cap called a karpus.

=== Weaponry ===
About two thirds of each infantry company were armed with muskets, and the rest with a 5.55 meters (18 foot 2 inches) pikes. Every infantryman was also armed with a sword, a straight-bladed rapier designed principally for thrusting.

At the outbreak of the Great Northern War, the Swedish musketeers were mostly equipped with a 20 millimetres (0.79 in) calibre flintlock musket without a bayonet. Twelve men of each company—typically the strongest and tallest—were grenadiers, who were the only soldiers to have bayonets affixed to their muskets, as regular musketeers were meant to use their rapiers for hand-to-hand combat. Grenadiers were often placed on the flanks of a unit to protect against cavalry. A bayonet-equipped musket was considered to be more practical for that, as it gave greater reach than a sword when facing a mounted opponent and could be braced against the impact of a charge. Eventually all musket-armed soldiers were issued bayonets as well in 1704, though they also still retained their swords.

The Swedish heavy cavalryman was equipped with a rapier almost one metre long (primarily for thrusting and secondarily for slashing), a carbine and two pistols. They also wore a steel breastplate and a buff coat. Each dragoon was equipped with a rapier, a musket (with bayonet), and two pistols.

=== Rations ===
A soldier's daily ration was to consist of 625 grams (22.0 oz) of dry bread, 850 grams (30 oz) of butter or pork, 1/3 litre (0.59 imp pt; 0.70 US pt) of peas, and 2.5 litres (0.55 imp gal; 0.66 US gal) of beer. The butter or pork was often replaced by fish if the latter were available. Water was generally avoided since it was often contaminated.

== Units and formations ==
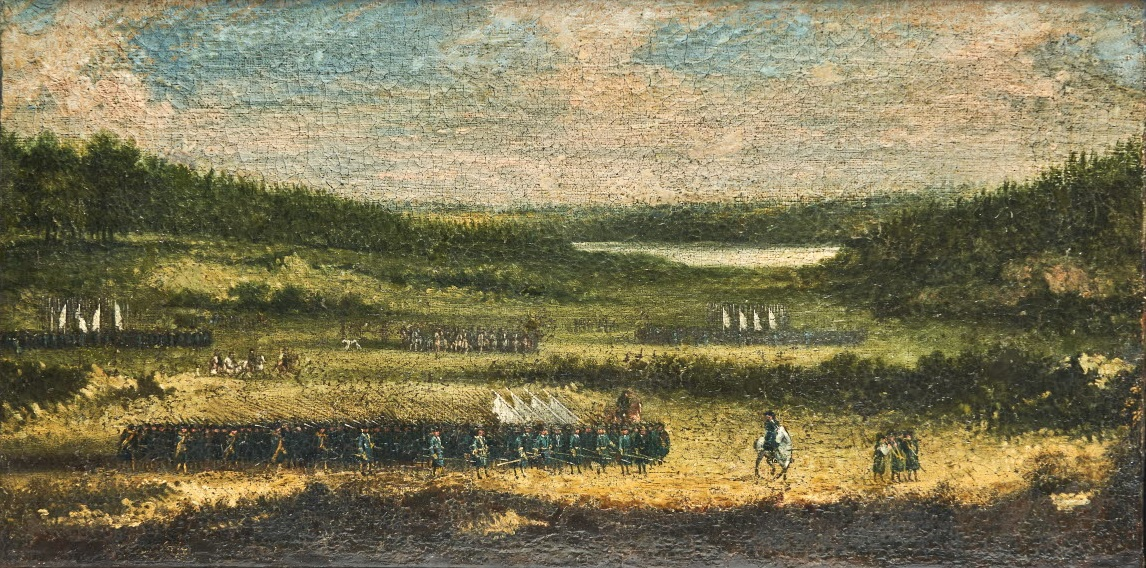
Charles XI exercising the Life Guards of Foot at Gärdet in 1691

A Carolean infantry regiment consisted of roughly 1,200 men, divided into two battalions of 600 men each. The battalion was the smallest tactical unit of the Swedish army and consisted of four companies of 150 men each. Prior to battle, the men were usually formed into four ranks (four men deep), however, a battalion could also be späckad (i.e. fattened) in six ranks. About one-third of the men were pikemen. These pikemen often were in the middle of each battalion with musketeers on their flanks; however, if the battalion was späckad, the pikemen were placed in the third and fourth ranks. Grenadiers were often on the flanks of the musketeers—on the left and right of each battalion—to protect against enemy cavalry and to toss grenades to break enemy formations (there being one grenadier for ten musketeers). On occasion, the grenadiers formed their own battalions, such as the Life Grenadier Regiment. The width of a battalion was roughly 180 metres (590 ft) (or 135 metres (443 ft) with the battalion in close formation).

A cavalry regiment consisted of roughly 800 men with 1000 horses among them, divided into four squadrons of 200 men each. The squadron was the tactical unit of the cavalry and consisted of two companies of 100 men each.

The Drabant Corps was a special unit made up of approximately 150 men under the personal command of King Charles XII, of which he was captain. To become a private in the corps, one had to attain the rank of captain in the regular army. The corps second in command was a colonel with the title of Kaptenlöjtnant (Lieutenant-Captain). This corps fought to the bitter end, and some of its veterans carried Charles XII's coffin to Stockholm for burial in 1719.

Certain irregular units were also used, most notably the Vlachs cavalry. However, these were not suited for combat, but only reconnaissance and to chase routed enemies.

== Tactics ==
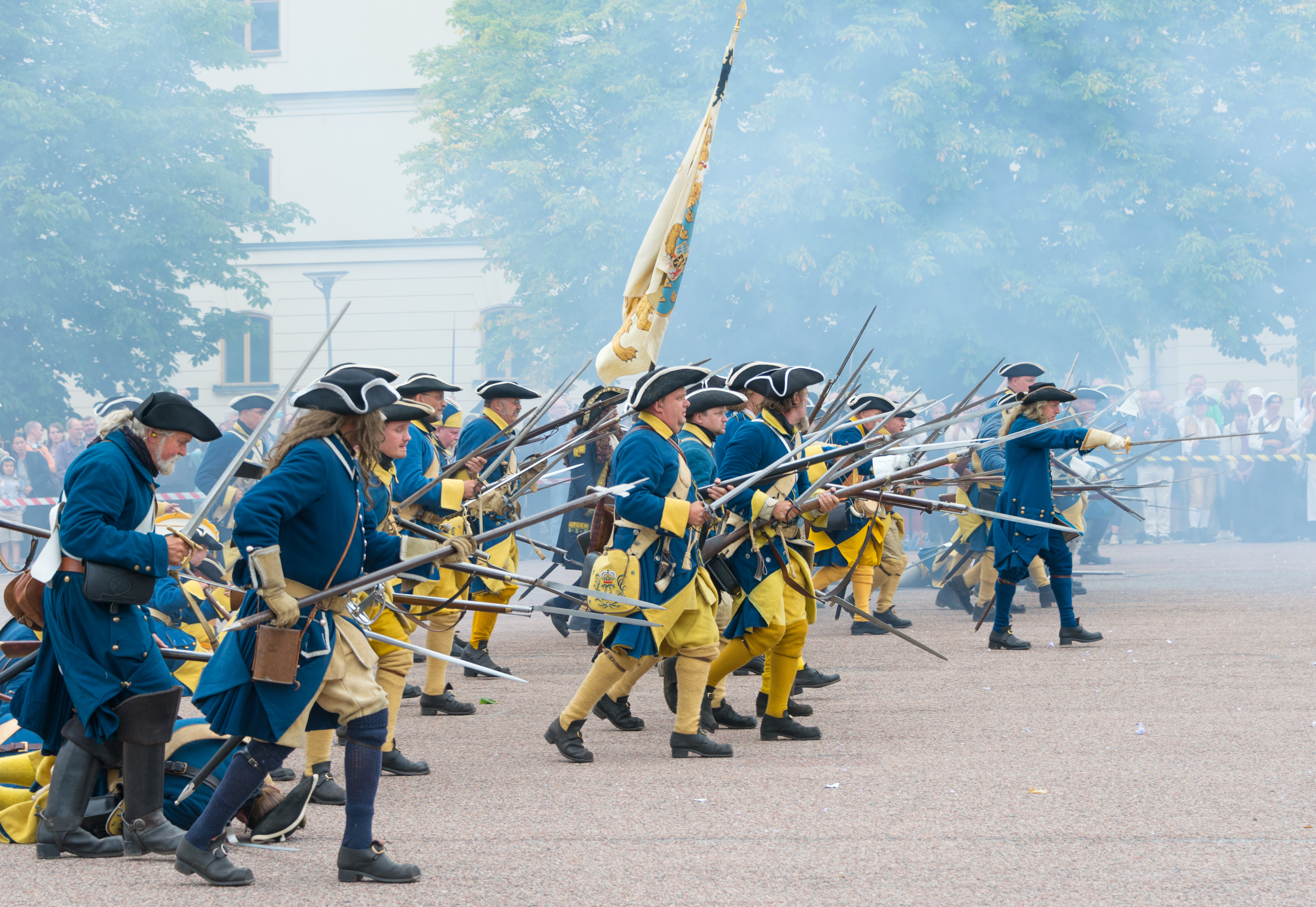
Reenactors demonstrating a gå–på attack by Carolean infantry, Stockholm, 2019.

Swedish military doctrine of the Carolean era was distinguished by its emphasis on aggressive action and shock tactics, the so-called gå-på (literally "go-on") method. This attitude stood in contrast to other European armies of the period, which were coming to rely increasingly on musketry, delivered in the form of volley fire by line infantry, to win battles. As such, Swedish armies continued to field large numbers of pikemen throughout the Great Northern War, even though the weapon had largely disappeared from western European battlefields by that time. Similarly, the proportion of heavy cavalry in the Swedish army was unusually high by western standards. Indeed, of the 31,000 Swedish soldiers who participated in Charles XII's Russian campaign, some 16,800 troops, over half the overall force, were cavalrymen.

Gå-på tactics enabled the Caroleans to repeatedly overcome much larger enemy armies, as the psychological impact of their rapid approach and their steely discipline under fire, combined with their fearsome reputation, often served to unsettle the opposing troops even before physical contact was made. Moreover, if some enemy troops lost their nerve and fled then panic could quite easily spread through the rest of the enemy force, so a quick success against even a relatively small enemy unit was often enough to trigger a general rout. The preference for aggressive action also served, perhaps counterintuitively, as a way to reduce losses, as it ensured that battles would be resolved quickly rather than degenerating into bloody attritional struggles, as often happened when two armies using volley tactics clashed. This was especially important for the Swedish army as it lacked the manpower reserves of larger neighbours like Poland-Lithuania and Russia, and thus could not replenish its ranks after heavy defeats.

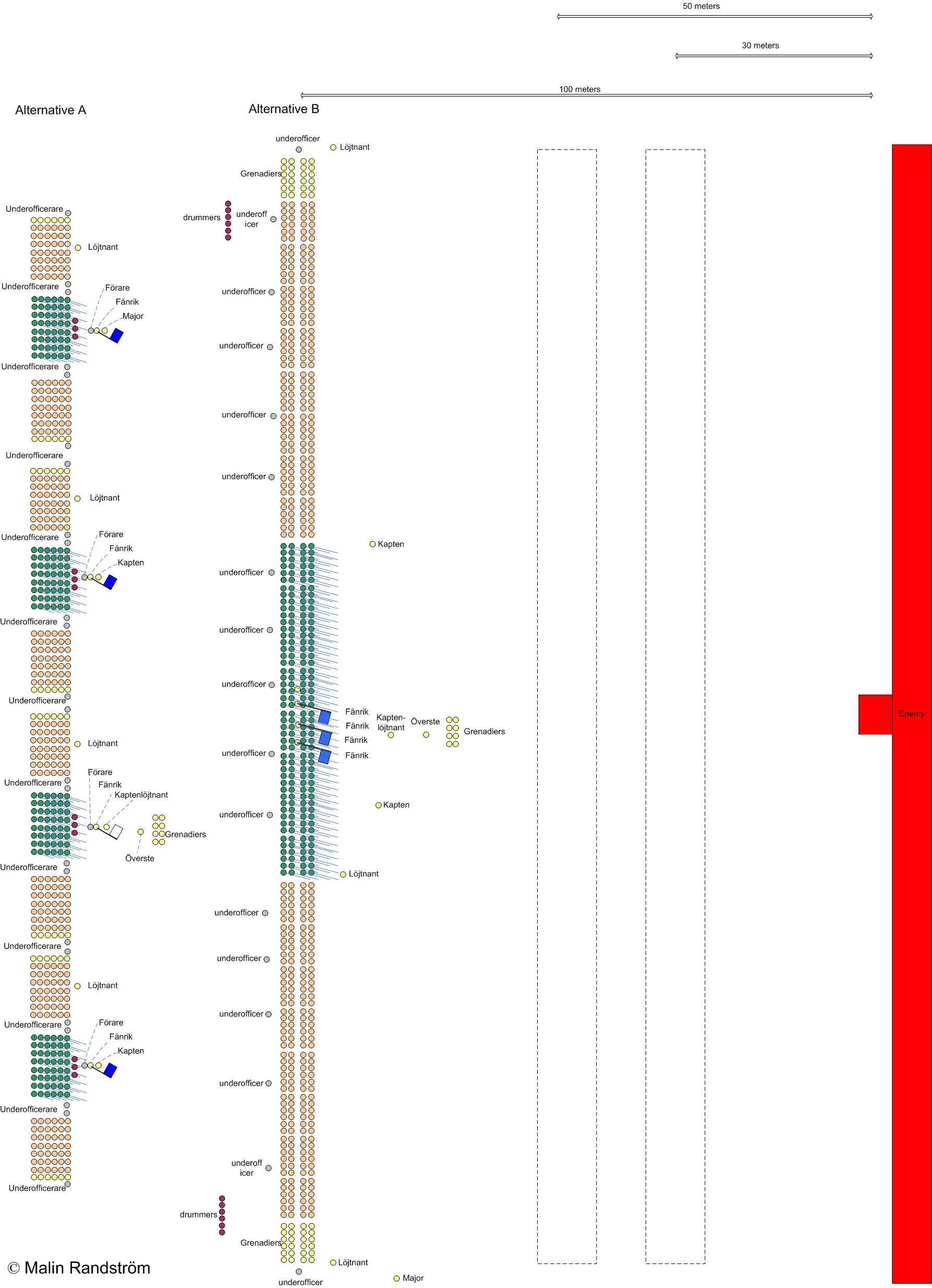
Diagram illustrating two different methods of attack by Carolean infantry: A) by company, B) by battalion.

The downsides of the gå-på doctrine were that it required strict discipline on the part of the soldiers (see below), and that it was, like all shock tactics a fundamentally risky strategy which could backfire horribly if the commander misjudged the time or place to mount an attack, or if an assault was mounted against enemies with high morale in prepared defensive positions. The latter scenario occurred at the Battle of Poltava, where Peter the Great was able to lure Charles XII into mounting an attack against a Russian camp protected by field fortifications, leading to an overwhelming Swedish defeat.

=== Infantry Gå–På ===
Never have I seen such a combination of uncontrollable dash and
perfectly controlled discipline, such soldiers and such subjects
are not to be found the wide world over except in Sweden

— Magnus Stenbock on the Battle of Gadebusch (1712)

According to army regulations of 1694 and 1701, infantry attacks were to be executed as follows: In four ranks with gaps, a Swedish battalion would march "smoothly and slowly" towards the enemy lines, braving enemy fire that often started at a distance of approximately 100 metres. The Swedish soldiers were told not to fire until "you could see the whites in the enemies' eyes", a range of roughly 50 metres. When the marching drums stopped the two rear ranks would fill the gaps within the two foremost ranks and fire a salvo, then draw their swords. The two rear ranks would then move back to their previous position, and the two foremost ranks would close the gaps in their lines, after which the battalion would resume their attack. The two foremost ranks would discharge their muskets in a final volley when they were within range to charge, a distance of roughly 20 metres. At these ranges, the powerful muskets usually felled many enemy troops, having a great physical and psychological impact on opponents.

Directly after the final volley, the Caroleans charged the enemy ranks with pikes, bayonets, and rapiers. Note that the pikes were used as an offensive weapon; in close combat, they had the advantage over their foes' weapons due to their long reach. Often, complete ranks of enemies fled before physical contact was made, frightened by the long pikes and the fact that the Swedish battalions had previously calmly withstood their fire.

==== Later modifications ====
This method was slightly changed during the Great Northern War. The slow march was replaced by running, to take fewer casualties and begin combat sooner, while optimally still frightening the enemy with a swift, unflinching advance into their fire. The Swedish firing distance was reduced from 50 metres to 15–20 metres for the first volley of the rear ranks who would no longer fall into their previous position behind the front ranks. Instead, they would follow in the gaps within the front ranks. As a result, the battalion attacked in two closely formed ranks, which made the final charge more effective, as the Carolean troops would be closely packed together, making a heavier impact than before.

=== Cavalry Gå–På ===
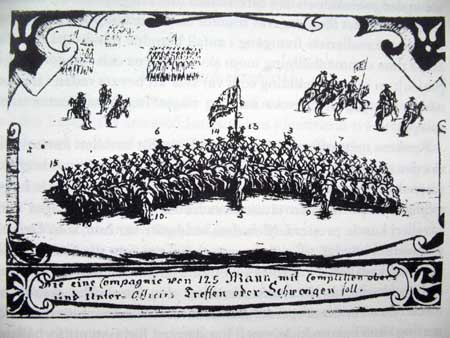
Swedish cavalry riding "knee behind knee".

The Swedish cavalry fought in a similarly aggressive way, also called the "Carolean manner". Whereas in other European armies, cavalry would form up "knee to the knee" (i.e. in a line, usually only one or two ranks deep), the Swedish cavalry would form up in a tightly packed wedge formation several ranks deep, "knee behind knee" (Swedish: knä bakom knä), in order to ensure that their charge struck the enemy with the maximum possible force. They were moreover armed with rapiers, swords specifically designed for stabbing rather than slashing.

The cavalry would not normally use their pistols during the charge (again in contrast to practice elsewhere in Europe), and in 1704 a new regulation was enacted explicitly forbidding troopers from using the pistol when charging; pistols were still carried, but were to be used during the melee combat after the charge, or when pursuing routed enemies. In 1705, another regulation decreed that the cavalry were to ride at a trot during the initial phase of the attack and then break into a full gallop just before reaching the enemy.

=== Coordination between units ===
Close coordination between infantry, cavalry, and sometimes artillery was needed to break down enemy defences successfully. Only infantry would normally risk a frontal assault on a well-prepared enemy line, preferably with artillery assistance. Regimental cannons would keep pace with infantry and protect them against enemy attacks as they reloaded. The cavalry would strike the opposing cavalry or charge disorganized infantry, preferably in the flank or rear. Cavalry was also used to cover an army in retreat or to interfere with and chase remaining enemy after a successful infantry attack. If a cavalry attack were repulsed, it would fall back behind friendly infantry lines and regroup. If necessary, the infantry could fall back using alternating firing and movement. In some situations, infantry squares were used for protection against flanking cavalry attacks. This formation was effective as all sides of the square would be facing outwards, removing the risk of a vulnerable rear or flank attack, and the formation presented enemy horses with a tightly packed mass of troops and a veritable hedge of sharp weapons, discouraging them from a charge.

Coordination between the different branches of the army was especially important for the Swedish victory at the Battle of Gadebusch, which was achieved largely through close coordination between the Swedish infantry and artillery.

== Morale & discipline ==
=== Religion ===
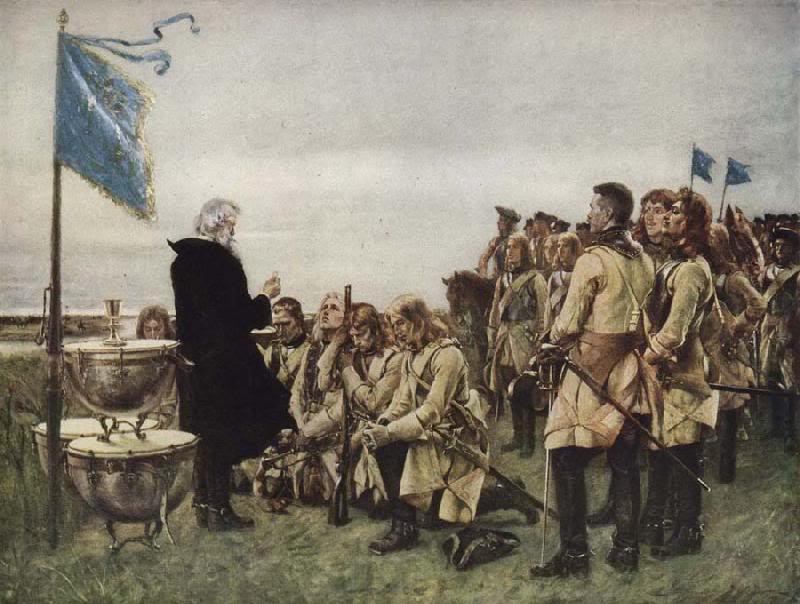
Regementets Kalk (1900) by Gustaf Cederström, portraying religion as the kalk ("lime" or "mortar") of the regiment.

Religion played a crucial role in the Carolean army. In addition to swearing fidelity to the Swedish king, the soldiers had to learn and follow the precepts and Lutheran doctrines of the Church of Sweden, and those who flouted religious regulations could be punished severely. For example, blasphemy was regarded as a capital offence. Religion was especially important for building cohesion among the soldiers, who were recruited from all over the Swedish Empire, including Bremen-Verden, Pomerania and Livonia, although Swedes and Finns always comprised a large majority. Even then, however, national identity was nowhere near as strong as it would become in later centuries, and a Swede from, say, Dalarna would feel little sense of compatriotism with one from Skåne or Ångermanland, let alone a Finn from Savonia. Religion was therefore important for encouraging a sense of unity and common purpose amongst the heterogenous soldiery, especially in the face of enemies considered to be "heretics", such as the Catholic Poles or Orthodox Russians. Prayers and Holy Communion were held before most Carolean battles, and field chaplains sometimes even accompanied the men onto the battlefield.

The chaplains' sermons often reminded soldiers that they had God's protection and assistance in battle, a notion originating when Sweden fought in the Thirty Years War as the continental leader of Protestantism. After the Battle of Narva, many soldiers believed that God had sent the blizzard that led to their victory as a punishment for their enemies' sins and hubris. After the catastrophe at Poltava, many Caroleans became convinced that God had changed sides.

=== Discipline ===
Good discipline was vital for the Swedish army's highly aggressive gå-på tactics, which required the Caroleans to keep in formation and hold their fire as they approached the enemy, even if coming under a hail of bullets themselves. One way of inculcating such extreme self-control was by encouraging a sort of fatalism among the troops: soldiers were told not to be afraid of battle, since if God wanted them to survive then nothing could harm them, and conversely if He had decreed that they were to die then death would come even if they tried to flee. On a more practical level, the army enforced draconian codes of discipline in order to encourage immediate and unthinking obedience among the men.

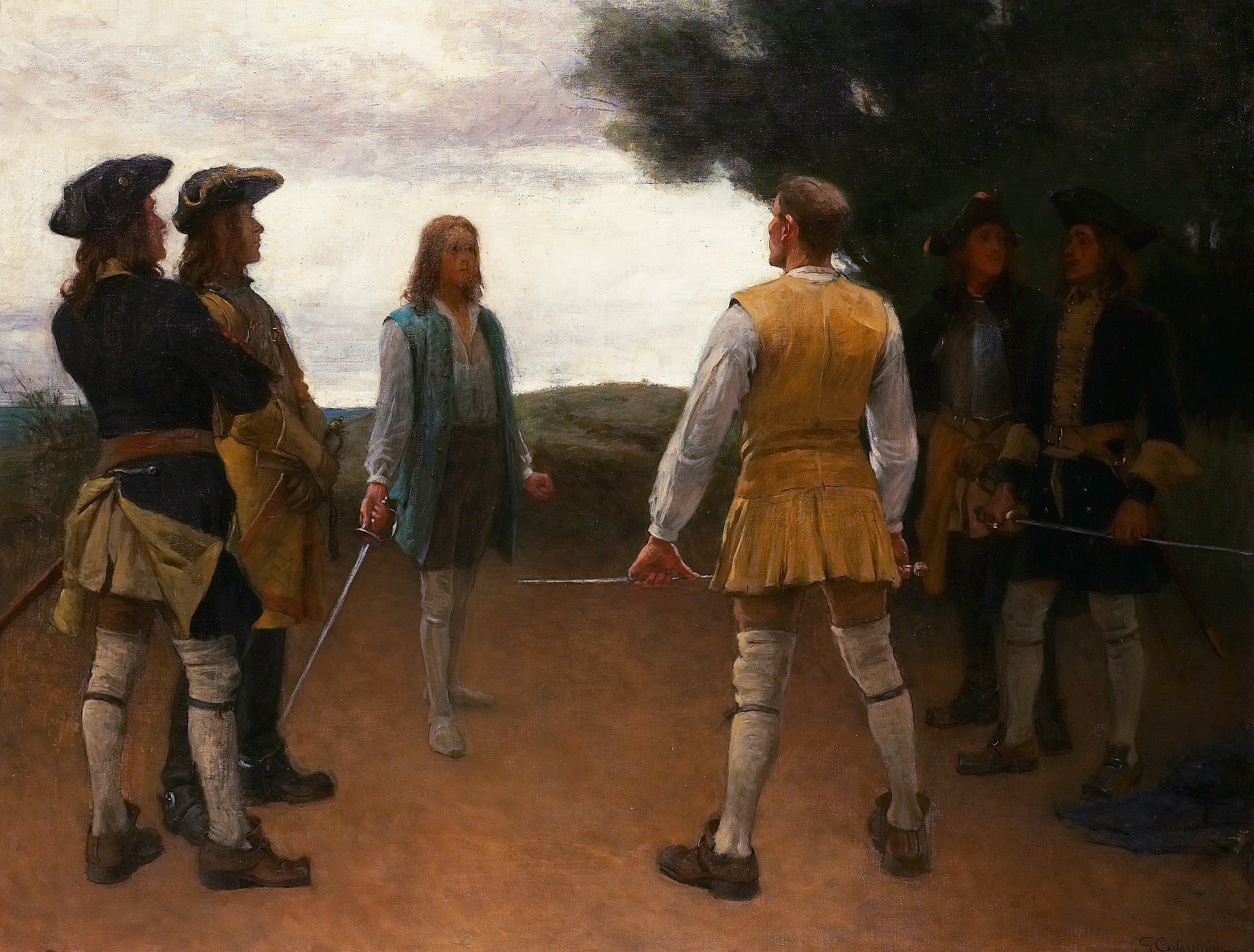
David och Goliath (1918) by Gustaf Cederström. Duelling was strictly forbidden in the Swedish army, but still occurred from time to time.

Deliberate efforts were also made to boost the soldiers' morale in various ways. New recruits were sorted into regiments based on particular provinces and districts, in order to encourage a sense of local pride and esprit de corps.

Similarly, Charles XII is known to have tried to foster a sense of fraternity within the army by granting commissions and promotions on the basis of merit rather than social status or wealth, as was common in other European armies at the time. A famous example of this policy concerns the young Count Oxenstierna, grandson of the famous statesman Axel Oxenstierna, who began his military career as a simple cavalryman, later promoted to corporal. Carl Piper urged Charles to promote the count to cornet, but the king refused, declaring that, "Old nobility and new nobility mean nothing as to the quality of a man. We have many regimental officers in the army who are not nobles and yet good folk. When a cavalryman is good, it is just the same, whether he is a nobleman or nothing. "

The army's efforts were generally successful; the Swedish army was renowned for the high levels of battlefield discipline among its troops, and the ability of the Caroleans to advance steadily through barrages of punishing enemy fire often served to impress and unsettle their opponents, giving them a moral edge when the melee fighting began. On the other hand, the Caroleans' discipline was not always flawless away from the battlefield. Even though looting was strictly forbidden in the Swedish army, Swedish soldiers were known to engage in the practice from time to time, most notoriously in the aftermath of the Battle of Narva (1700) and Storming of Lemberg. Abuses against civilians were also not unheard-of, although Charles XII issued strict ordinances against such excesses during his Polish and Saxon campaigns; several instances are recorded of Swedish soldiers being sentenced to death after flouting these orders.

== End of the Carolean period ==
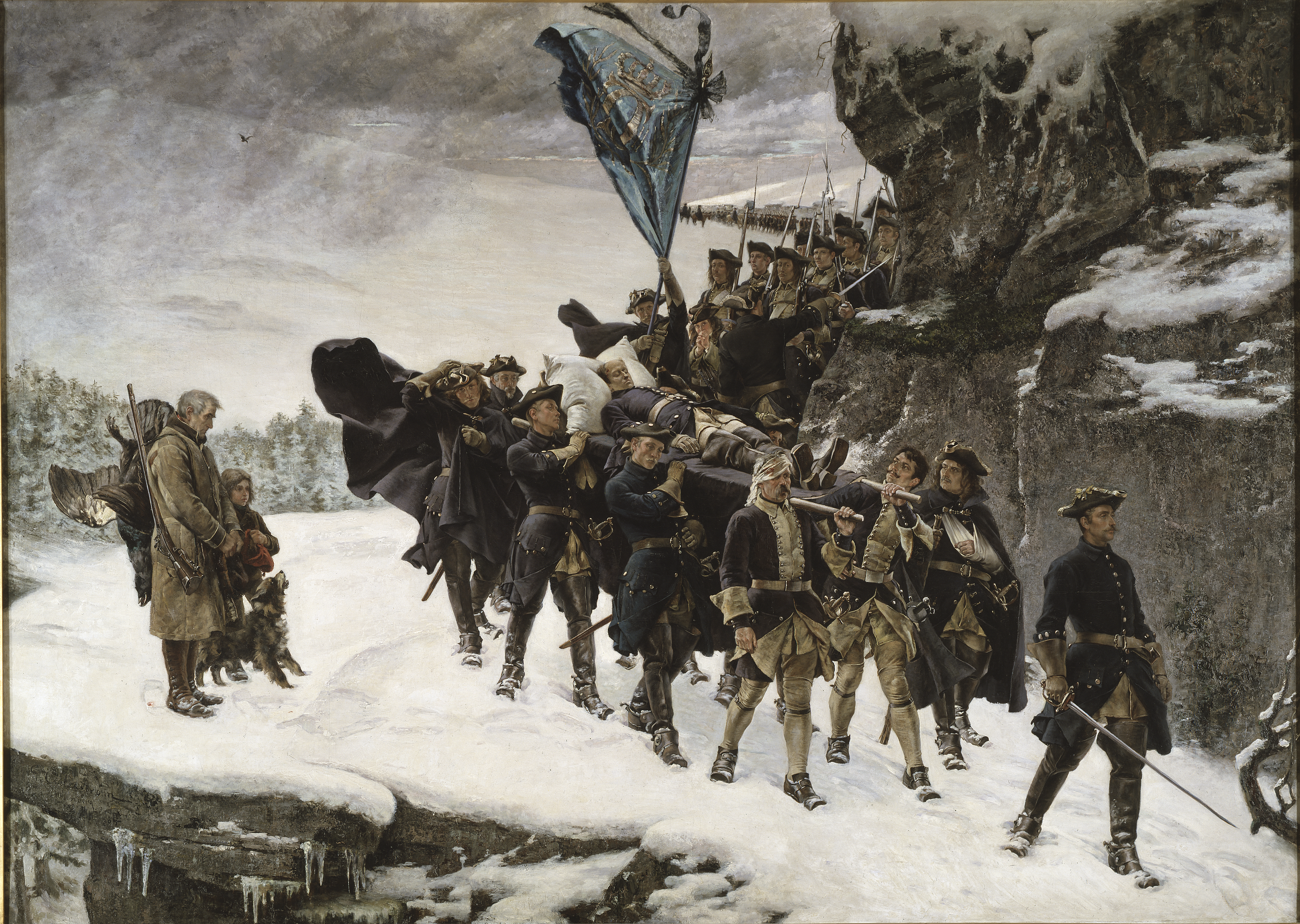
Bringing Home the Body of King Karl XII (Gustaf Cederström, 1884). A heavily romanticised depiction of the Drabant Corps carrying King Charles's body home to Sweden.

The term "Carolean" is not used for Swedish soldiers after the death of Charles XII in 1718, the return to constitutional monarchy under the 1719 Instrument of Government and the end of the Great Northern War in 1721. However, the Swedish army continued to use the equipment, organisation and tactics of the Carolean period for the next sixty years, until the reforms of King Gustav III in the late 1770s.

== See also ==
- Military of the Swedish Empire
- Swedish army
- Swedish allotment system
- Great Northern War
- Carolean Death March

== Notes ==
=== Bibliography ===
- Laidre, Margus (1996). Segern vid Narva : början till en stormakts fall. Stockholm: Natur och kultur. ISBN 9789127056015.
- Åberg, Alf; Göransson, Göte (1976). Karoliner. Stockholm: Trevi. ISBN 91-7160-208-9.
- Sjöström, Oskar (2008). Fraustadt 1706. Ett fält färgat rött (in Swedish). Lund: Historiska Media. ISBN 9789185507900.
- Konovaltjuk, Pavel; Lyth, Einar (2009). Vägen till Poltava. Slaget vid Lesnaja 1708 (in Swedish). Svenskt Militärhistorisk Biblioteks Förlag.
- Larsson, Olle (2009). Stormaktens sista krig. Lund: Historiska Media. ISBN 978-91-85873-59-3.
- Larsson, Anders (2022). Karolinska uniformer och munderingar åren 1700 till 1721. Östersund: Jengel Förlag. ISBN 978-91-88573-43-8.
