= Zīlāni =

Village in Latvia

- Village
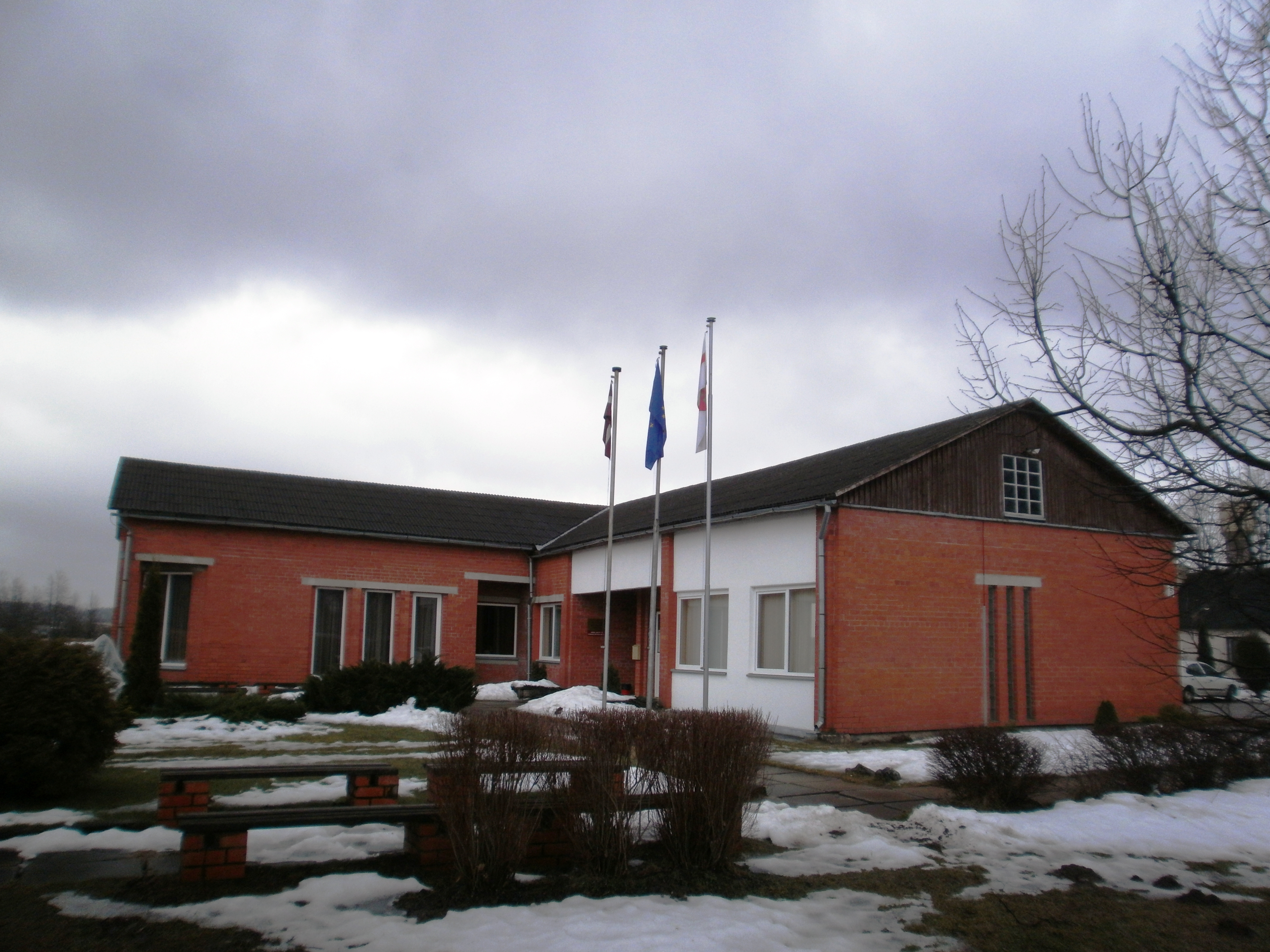

- Location in Latvia
- Coordinates: 56°30′52″N 25°56′36″E
- Country: Latvia
- Municipality: Jēkabpils Municipality
- Parish: Kūkas Parish

Population (2021)
  - Total: 295
- Climate: Dfb

Zīlāni is a village in Kūkas Parish, Jēkabpils Municipality in the Latgale region of Latvia. It is located 3 km northeast of Jēkabpils town. The village lies on the A12 road, which is part of the E22. The village was formerly connected by railway but its station closed in 1995.

In the early twentieth century a number of depot workers in the village had revolutionary ideas and their own underground organization. They smuggled weapons. Today a 50 cm long dagger used by the workers is on display at the Jēkabpils History Museum.

== Climate ==
Zīlāni has a humid continental climate (Köppen Dfb).

Climate data for Zīlāni (1991-2020 normals, extremes 1943-present)
Month	Jan	Feb	Mar	Apr	May	Jun	Jul	Aug	Sep	Oct	Nov	Dec	Year
Record high °C (°F)	10.0 (50.0)	11.8 (53.2)	18.0 (64.4)	27.9 (82.2)	30.0 (86.0)	32.3 (90.1)	34.7 (94.5)	34.3 (93.7)	30.5 (86.9)	22.6 (72.7)	16.6 (61.9)	10.3 (50.5)	34.7 (94.5)
Mean daily maximum °C (°F)	−1.8 (28.8)	−1.2 (29.8)	3.8 (38.8)	11.8 (53.2)	17.7 (63.9)	21.1 (70.0)	23.6 (74.5)	22.4 (72.3)	16.7 (62.1)	9.6 (49.3)	3.3 (37.9)	−0.4 (31.3)	10.5 (51.0)
Daily mean °C (°F)	−4.0 (24.8)	−4.0 (24.8)	−0.1 (31.8)	6.6 (43.9)	12.1 (53.8)	15.7 (60.3)	18.1 (64.6)	16.9 (62.4)	11.9 (53.4)	6.1 (43.0)	1.4 (34.5)	−2.1 (28.2)	6.6 (43.8)
Mean daily minimum °C (°F)	−6.5 (20.3)	−7.1 (19.2)	−3.9 (25.0)	1.6 (34.9)	6.1 (43.0)	10.1 (50.2)	12.7 (54.9)	11.7 (53.1)	7.6 (45.7)	3.1 (37.6)	−0.9 (30.4)	−4.4 (24.1)	2.5 (36.5)
Record low °C (°F)	−35.4 (−31.7)	−36.7 (−34.1)	−24.6 (−12.3)	−14.4 (6.1)	−4.6 (23.7)	−0.4 (31.3)	4.1 (39.4)	0.3 (32.5)	−4.2 (24.4)	−10.9 (12.4)	−22.0 (−7.6)	−35.2 (−31.4)	−36.7 (−34.1)
Average precipitation mm (inches)	47.8 (1.88)	40.4 (1.59)	37.2 (1.46)	37.0 (1.46)	59.6 (2.35)	75.0 (2.95)	71.0 (2.80)	74.5 (2.93)	56.0 (2.20)	69.4 (2.73)	54.7 (2.15)	47.5 (1.87)	670.1 (26.37)
Average precipitation days (≥ 1 mm)	12	10	9	8	9	10	11	11	9	11	11	12	123
Average relative humidity (%)	87.9	85.6	77.3	68.5	68.0	72.6	74.6	77.0	82.0	86.4	89.5	89.4	79.9
Source 1: LVĢMC
Source 2: NOAA (precipitation days, humidity 1991-2020)
