= Krustpils Castle =

Castle in Latvia

- Jēkabpils, Latvia
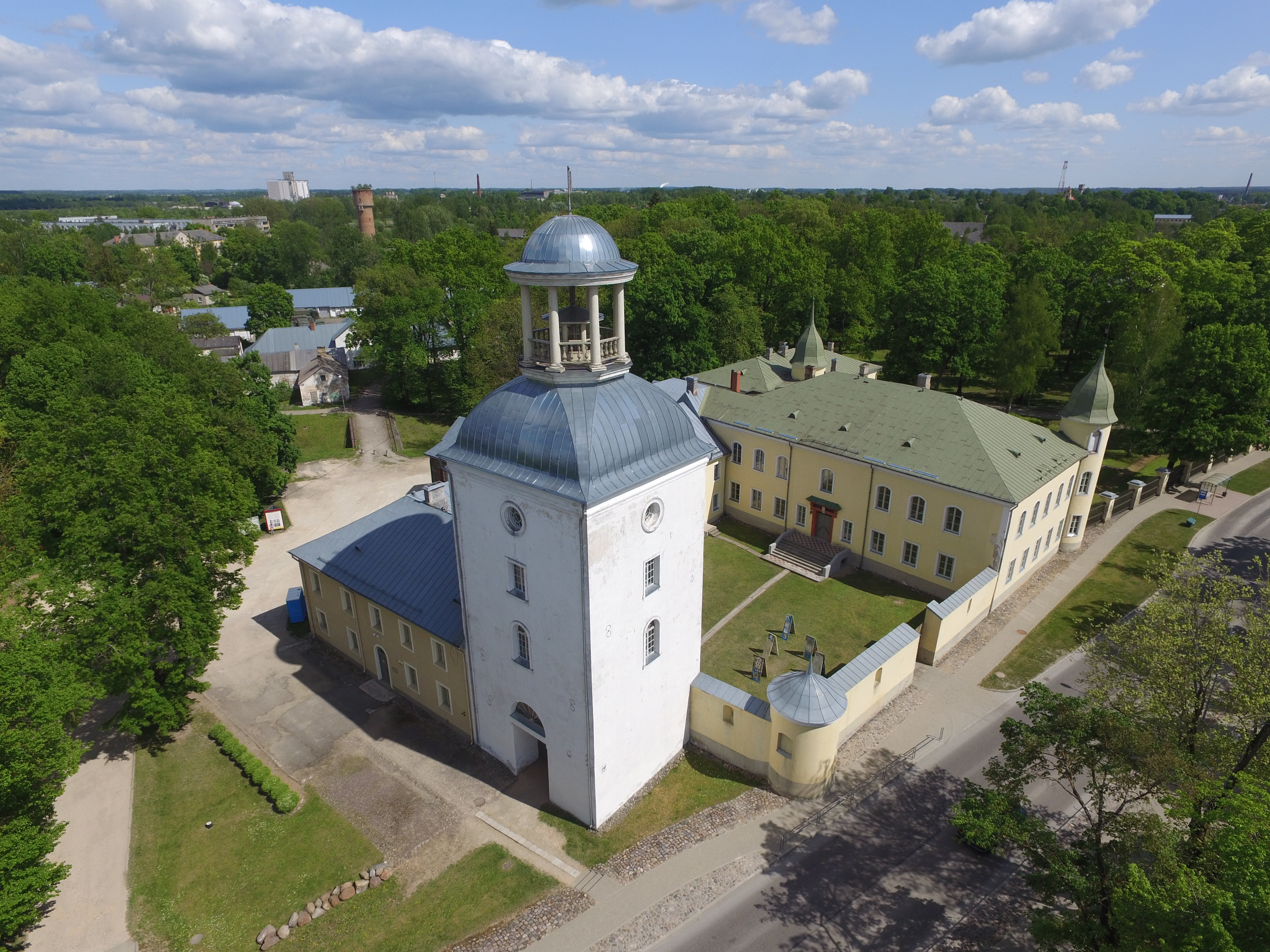

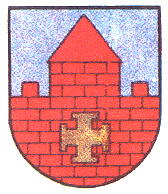

Site information
- Type: Castle
- Open to the public: yes
- Condition: Preserved

Location
- Coordinates: 56.5111°N 25.8592°E

Site history
- Built: Between 1255 and 1297
- Built by: Archbishop of Riga

Krustpils Castle (German: Kreutzburg, Polish: Krzyżbork) is a castle in Jēkabpils, in the Latgale region of Latvia. It is one of the best preserved medieval castles in Latvia. During the Russo-Turkish War (1877–1878), Turkish prisoners of war were held here, many of whom later settled here permanently. Here the Latgale artillery regiment was located. During the Second World War infirmary of the German army was located here. A military hospital of the Red Army was placed here after August 1944.

== History ==
The first written reference of the Krustpils dates from 1237, when the Archbishop of Riga built a castle named Kreutz. In 1359, the Livonian order took seven castles belonging to the Riga Archbishopric, being Krustpils among them. During the Livonian war in 1559 the castle was devastated.

When the Livonian state was dissolved, Krustpils became property of the Polish–Lithuanian Commonwealth from 1561 to 1772, while the opposite Jēkabpils was part of the Duchy of Courland and Semigallia. The difference between the Latgalian language and the Selonian dialect of the inhabitants on either side of the Daugava River remains as of today. In 1585, Stephen Báthory of Poland–Lithuania granted a large area which included Krustpils to general Nikolai von Korff, whose family owned the castle until the Latvian agrarian reforms of 1920 came into effect. As Krustpils castle became a residence of landlords, it gradually lost its medieval character.

In the 18th century the castle got a representative look when Baroque elements were added to exterior of the castle. Krustpils castle together with other buildings of this complex was transferred to the Latvian army after 1920. Economic recovery was effected by the opening of the railway line Riga-Dvinsk in 1861 and the line Ventspils-Ribinska in 1904. Krustpils in 1920 received then its town charter. In 1932 a sugar factory was opened, and in 1935 Krustpils already counted for 3,658 inhabitants, of whom 53% were Latvians. In 1962 Krustpils was eventually incorporated into the town of Jēkabpils.

During the Soviet times regiments of Soviet army were located in the castle such as the 16th regiment of long-range intelligence aviation and main storehouses of the 15th air regiment. For 50 years the premises were not managed and were close to be considered as ruins. On April 13, 1994, it houses the Jēkabpils Museum of History, from then on, there has been ongoing active investigation and renewal of the castle.

== See also ==
- List of castles in Latvia
- The Last Motor Race of The Empire Page 50 - 53.
