= Abram Leibovich =

Latvian entrepreneur (1869–1941)

- Ābrams Elija Leibovics
- Born: 1869; Jekabpils, Courland Governorate
- Died: 1941; Riga, Generalbezirk Lettland
- Spouse: Musja Bloha (1877–1941)
- Children: 5

Abram Elijah Leibovich (born Ābrams Elija Leibovics, in 1869–1941) was a Latvian Jewish entrepreneur. Founder and director of the Riga Radio Factory (Rīgas Radiorūpnīca).

== Biography ==
Born in 1869 in Jēkabpils, in 1894 he opened Rēzekne's first photo salon. After World War I, Abram Leibovics owned a photographic goods store at 2 Krišjānis Barons Street in Riga.

In 1926, he established the joint-stock company Abram Leibovics Photo Radio Center, where initially foreign radio receiver models such as Telefunken, Kramolin, DeTeWe, and Lumophon were assembled from imported parts.

In 1928, under an order from the Ministry of the Interior, his company produced 200 three-vacuum-tube battery powered radio receivers for border guards under the direction of designer Aleksandrs Apsītis. In 1929, it manufactured a large quantity of radio tuning capacitors. In 1930, workshops of A. Leibovics' firm on Krišjānis Barons Street developed the two-tube mains power receiver "Rīgafons"; over the year, three people assembled about 1,000 receivers, generating 100,000 lats in profit for the company. "Rīgafons" was followed by "Eiropafons" and "Kosmafons".

In 1932, the company moved to new premises at 41 Mūkusalas Street; that same year, Apsītis ceased work in radio receiver production due to disagreements with Abram Leibovics and founded his own radio manufacturing firm "A. Apsītis and F. Žukovskis" in 1933. In 1935, it created the Ferrosupers 36 model—the first radio receiver with an electromagnetic coil. In 1936, the company employed 240 people.

In 1939, Latvian security police files (Record Group 3235) documented perceived subversive activities at the Abram Leibovics radio factory in Riga, including reports from informers that young Jewish workers listened to Russian communist songs broadcast from Moscow and sang them. The security police maintained surveillance on Jewish religious organizations, communist and Zionist activities, and illegal currency operations (free currency exchange being prohibited in Latvia during the 1930s). A list of "unreliable citizens" was compiled, which included Osher Prezma—a salesman at the Leibovics photo and radio shop in Riga—for subscribing to the prohibited Kovno Yiddish newspaper Naye Wort. Prezma's wife Hinda was the daughter of Abram Leibovics' first cousin.

After the Soviet occupation of Latvia in 1940, Leibovics' company was nationalized and renamed "Radiopionieri". The company was managed by A. Leibovics' sons, who were arrested and sentenced in March 1941 for paying out 20,000 lats to Abram Leibovics in July 1940. "Radiopionieri" was merged with the nationalized company "Nikolajs Klemptners".

In 1941, the paralyzed Abram Leibovics perished in the Riga Ghetto.
