= Jēkabpils =

State city of Latvia, capital of Jēkabpils Municipality

Jēkabpils Jakobstadt
- State city
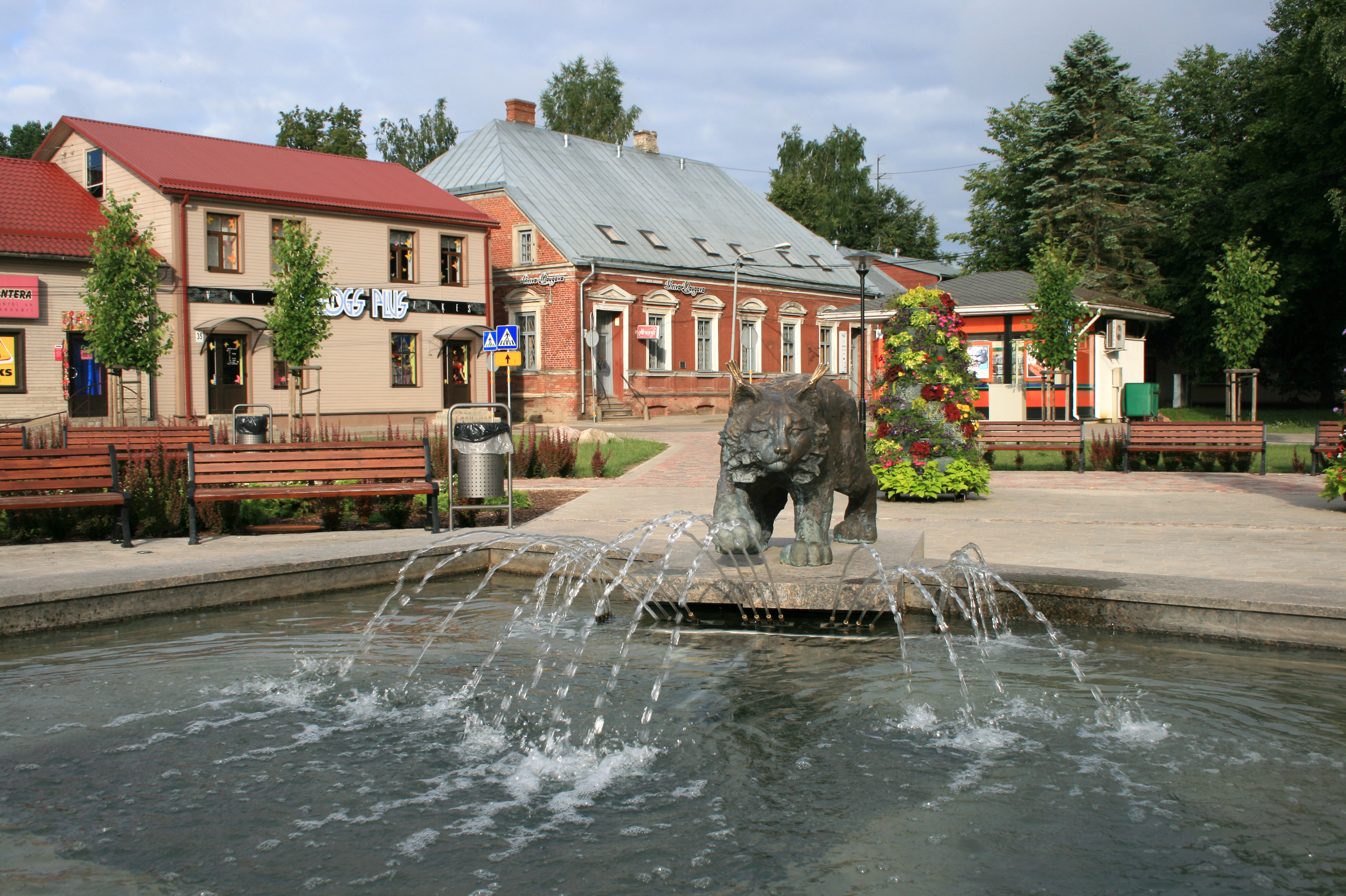

- Flag Coat of arms Brandmark

- Location in Latvia
- Coordinates: 56°29′58″N 25°52′42″E
- Country: Latvia
- Municipality: Jēkabpils Municipality
- Town rights: 1670

Government
  - Mayor: Raivis Ragainis (GKML)
  - Number of city council members: 13

Area
  - Total: 26.71 km^{2} (10.31 sq mi)
  - Land: 23.41 km^{2} (9.04 sq mi)
  - Water: 3.3 km^{2} (1.3 sq mi)
- Elevation: 77 m (253 ft)

Population (2026)
  - Total: 20,685
  - Density: 883.6/km^{2} (2,289/sq mi)

GDP
  - State city: 288,652,000 euro (2021)
  - Per capita: 13,421 euro (2021)
- Time zone: UTC+2 (EET)
  - Summer (DST): UTC+3 (EEST)
- Postal code: LV-52(01/02)
- Calling code: (+371) 652
- Website: www.jekabpils.lv

Jēkabpils (Latvian: [ˈjeːkapːils]) is a state city in Jēkabpils Municipality in southeastern Latvia, located roughly halfway between the capital Riga and Daugavpils, and spanning the Daugava River. It is a state city (although without a separate municipal government), and is the seat of Jēkabpils Municipality. The name of the city literally translates into "Castle of Jacob".

Historic Jēkabpils lies on the left bank, in Selonia, while the historic Krustpils (German: Kreutzburg) lies on the right bank, in Latgale. The two cities were united during the Soviet rule in 1962 under the Jēkabpils name, but retain their distinct regional character.

Jēkabpils was also formerly home to the Soviet Jēkabpils Air Base.

== History ==
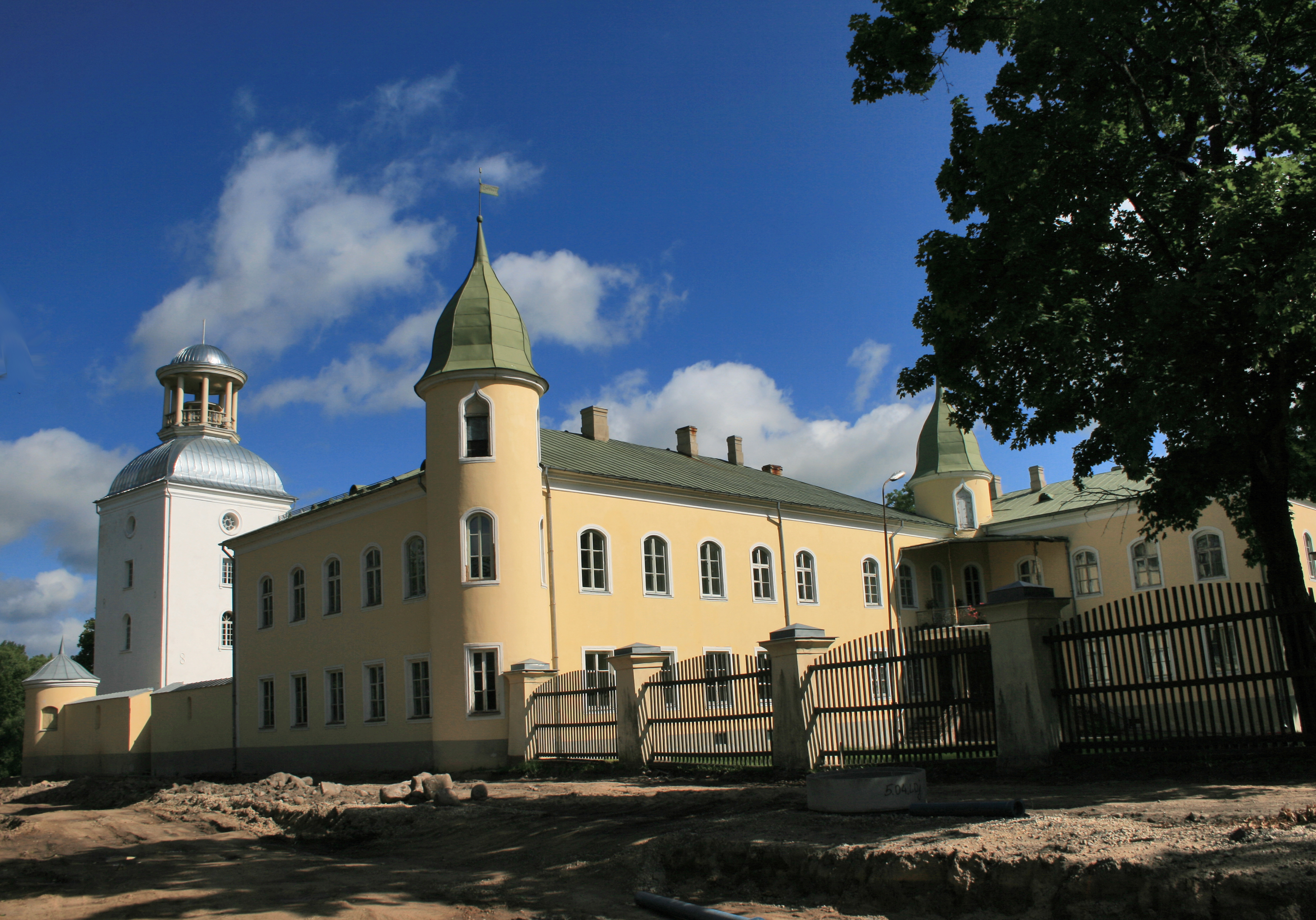
Krustpils Castle

A stone cross-castle – Cruczeborch (German: Kreutzburg) – was built in 1237 by the bishop of Riga. Archeological excavations on the nearby Asote mound indicate that this place was a busy trading centre for the Latgalians, one of the Latvian tribes, and had been inhabited since 1000 BC. An adjoining settlement already existed when Krustpils Castle was first built; it grew up around the castle as the village of Krustpils. The village was often destroyed during local wars, such as Polish-Swedish battles, but was always rebuilt afterward.

During the 17th century, persecuted Old Believers from Russia settled along the Daugava river. In 1670 this settlement, gradually growing around the Sala Inn, became known as Jēkabmiests (Jakobstadt in German) in honor of the Duke of Courland, Jacob Kettler, who granted Magdeburg rights to the town.

A local legend about the town's origin states that the duke was hunting one day but became lost. At the Daugava River, he simultaneously spotted a lynx underneath a fir tree as well as a town at the same time. This image of the lynx underneath a fir tree is the town's coat of arms.

In the period of the Duchy of Courland the residents of the town were mostly Russian Old believers, Poles and Lithuanians. Duke Jacob built a small port in the town to transport goods from a nearby iron foundry. At the end of the 17th century, there were an anchor mint, a gun foundry, lime and tar kilns and several other factories in Jakobstadt.

In 1704, during the Great Northern War, the Russians occupied the town. However, after few months a major battle (Battle of Jēkabpils), took place near the town. A Swedish army under Adam Lewenhaupt defeated a much larger Russian force and thus stopped Russian Empire from further invasion in the Duchy.

After the war and an epidemic of plague, the town again prospered. Barges from Belarus imported grain, honey, tobacco, spirits, textiles etc. At the same time, land transport from Friedrichstadt amounted to approx. 9,000 cart loads a year during the second half of the 18th century. Jakobstadt was also part of the postal road from Jelgava to Friedrichstadt and further to Ilūkste.

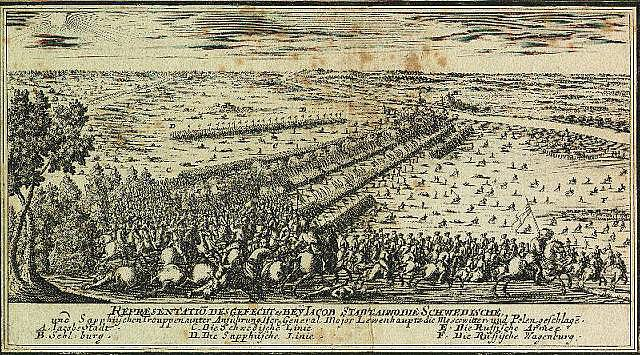
Battle of Jakobstadt in 1704

In 1764 the first ferry crossing to Krustpils was opened in the town. During the reign of Peter von Biron a small community of German-speaking craftsmen developed in the town besides Russians and Poles. Jews, however, were prohibited from entering the town. In 1795 Jakobstadt, like the whole Duchy of Courland and Semigallia, was incorporated into the Russian Empire.

In 1826 Friedrich Georg Wilhelm von Struve made his geodesic measurements near the town.
In 1834 the first hospital was opened in the town. During this period a theater and library were also opened, and the first streets were cobbled.
In 1861 with the opening of the Riga–Daugavpils railway through Krustpils the role of the Daugava and barges as a main means of transport decreased. However, the river was still used for timber rafting.

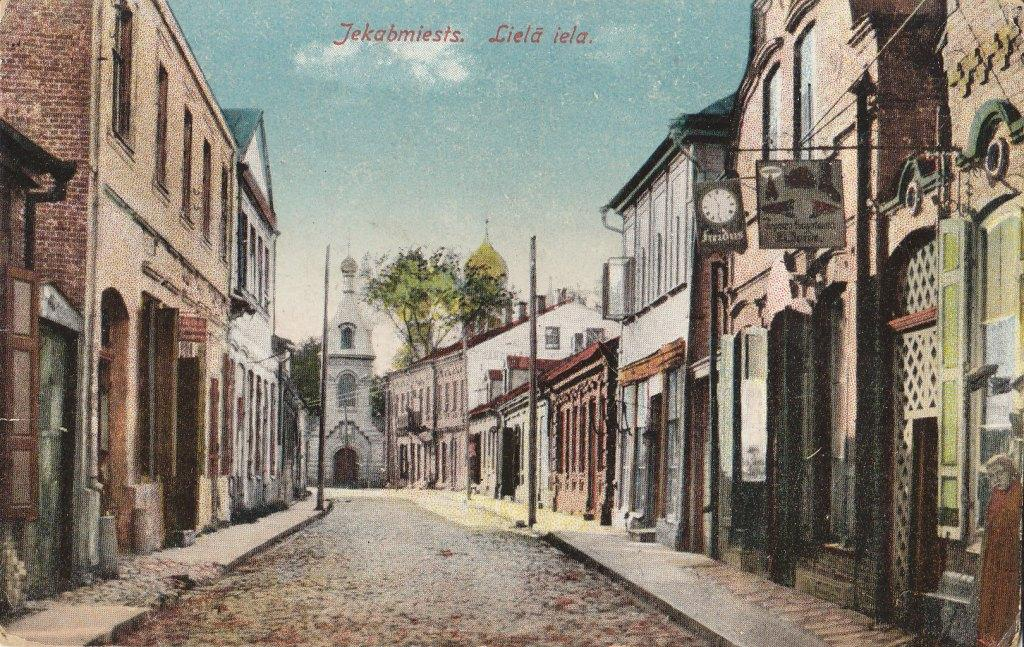
The Great Street (Lielā iela) in 1920

At the turn of the 20th century there were a bank, an insurance company, a match factory, a steam mill, a brewery, typography and several other enterprises. During the First World War heavy battles were fought around the town and some 280 buildings in the town were destroyed or damaged.

In 1919 Jēkabpils became the administrative centre of the newly established Jaunjelgava district, and in 1924, Jēkabmiests was officially renamed Jēkabpils ("Jēkabs' Castle"), becoming the center of Jēkabpils County (the former Jaunjelgava county). In 1932 a sugar refinery was built in the town. In 1936 a bridge was built over the Daugava. In this way Jēkabpils and Krustpils were united for the first time. During the Second World War the bridge was blown up. A new bridge was built only in 1962.

Jēkabpils and Krustpils were merged in 1962 under the name Jēkabpils. During the Soviet period the united city was the administrative center of Jēkabpils district and was home to several big factories. Among them were the sewing enterprise Asote, the dolomite splinter mine Dolomīts, a reinforced concrete construction factory, a dairy processing plant and several other enterprises. After the restoration of Latvian independence in 1991 many factories went bankrupt or production was drastically reduced.

From 2009 to 2021, the city, while being a separate first-level municipality (republican city, republikas pilsēta), was also the extraterritorial center of Jēkabpils Municipality. Since 2021, it retains state city status, but does not have a separate first-level local government.

== Geography ==
The population of Jēkabpils town is 29,100. The two historical parts of Jēkabpils — Krustpils and historic Jēkabpils — are connected by the bridge across the Daugava River.

=== Climate ===
Jēkabpils has a humid continental climate (Köppen Dfb).

Climate data for Jēkabpils (Zīlāni, 1991-2020 normals, extremes 1943–present)
Month	Jan	Feb	Mar	Apr	May	Jun	Jul	Aug	Sep	Oct	Nov	Dec	Year
Record high °C (°F)	10.0 (50.0)	11.8 (53.2)	18.0 (64.4)	26.3 (79.3)	30.0 (86.0)	32.3 (90.1)	34.7 (94.5)	34.3 (93.7)	30.5 (86.9)	22.6 (72.7)	16.6 (61.9)	10.3 (50.5)	34.7 (94.5)
Mean daily maximum °C (°F)	−1.8 (28.8)	−1.2 (29.8)	3.8 (38.8)	11.8 (53.2)	17.7 (63.9)	21.1 (70.0)	23.6 (74.5)	22.4 (72.3)	16.7 (62.1)	9.6 (49.3)	3.3 (37.9)	−0.4 (31.3)	10.5 (51.0)
Daily mean °C (°F)	−4.0 (24.8)	−4.0 (24.8)	−0.1 (31.8)	6.6 (43.9)	12.1 (53.8)	15.7 (60.3)	18.1 (64.6)	16.9 (62.4)	11.9 (53.4)	6.1 (43.0)	1.4 (34.5)	−2.1 (28.2)	6.6 (43.8)
Mean daily minimum °C (°F)	−6.5 (20.3)	−7.1 (19.2)	−3.9 (25.0)	1.6 (34.9)	6.1 (43.0)	10.1 (50.2)	12.7 (54.9)	11.7 (53.1)	7.6 (45.7)	3.1 (37.6)	−0.9 (30.4)	−4.4 (24.1)	2.5 (36.5)
Record low °C (°F)	−35.4 (−31.7)	−36.7 (−34.1)	−24.6 (−12.3)	−14.4 (6.1)	−4.6 (23.7)	−0.4 (31.3)	4.1 (39.4)	0.3 (32.5)	−4.2 (24.4)	−10.9 (12.4)	−22.0 (−7.6)	−35.2 (−31.4)	−36.7 (−34.1)
Average precipitation mm (inches)	47.8 (1.88)	40.4 (1.59)	37.2 (1.46)	37.0 (1.46)	59.6 (2.35)	75.0 (2.95)	71.0 (2.80)	74.5 (2.93)	56.0 (2.20)	69.4 (2.73)	54.7 (2.15)	47.5 (1.87)	670.1 (26.37)
Average precipitation days (≥ 1 mm)	12	10	9	8	9	10	11	11	9	11	11	12	123
Average relative humidity (%)	87.9	85.6	77.3	68.5	68.0	72.6	74.6	77.0	82.0	86.4	89.5	89.4	79.9
Source 1: LVĢMC
Source 2: NOAA (precipitation days, humidity 1991-2020)

== Demographics ==
As of 1 January 2017, the city had a population of 23,750.

Demographics of Jēkabpils in 2017 population census
Latvians	60.6%
Russians	26.7%
Belarusians	3.1%
Poles	2.9%
Ukrainians	1.8%
Others	5.0%

== Sights ==
=== Jēkabpils ===
In the older parts of the city, some buildings have been preserved. The castle of Krustpils houses the History Museum of Jēkabpils and Krustpils.

=== Jēkabpils district ===
One of the Struve Geodetic Arc original station points is located in Strūves park. In Tadenava, not far from Jēkabpils itself, there is a memorial museum to the great Latvian poet Rainis. Nearby are also the castle of Justine and Dignāja. The highest point of Selonia — Ormaņkalns is in the vicinity of Klauce. Between Nereta and Aknīste there is a museum "Riekstiņi" commemorating the famous Latvian writer Jānis Jaunsudrabiņš.

== Notable people ==
- Abram Leibovich (1869-1941), entrepreneur, founded the Riga Radio Factory
- Yaakov Ben Zion Mendelson (1875 – 1941), a renowned Russian-born Orthodox Jewish scholar, communal rabbi and Talmudist
- Uga Skulme (1895-1963), painter, stylistically he was a Cubist
- Konstantin Anisimovich Pavlov (1907-1976), icon painter and restorer
- Aivars Lembergs (born 1953), politician, oligarch, convicted money launderer and mayor of Ventspils from 1988 to 2021
- Elita Kļaviņa (born 1966), a former journalist, now an actress
- Sandis Ģirģens (born 1980), politician, Minister of the Interior, 2019 to 2021
- Arvis Viguls (born 1987), poet and translator

=== Sport ===
- Alberts Ozoliņš (1896–1985), weightlifter, he competed for Latvia at the 1924 Summer Olympics
- Juris Jaudzems (born 1963), bobsledder, competed at the 1988 Winter Olympics
- Andrejs Piedels (born 1970), latvian footballer, played 288 games and 14 for Latvia
- Juris Umbraško (born 1978), basketball coach
- Valts Eiduks (born 1986), cross-country skier, competed in at the 2006 Winter Olympics
- Andris Džeriņš (born 1988), ice hockey player.
- Deniss Rakels (born 1992), footballer, played 340 games and 32 for Latvia
- Artūrs Dārznieks (born 1993), luger, competed in the 2018 & 2022 Winter Olympics
- Reinis Nitišs (born 1995), World Rallycross driver

== Twin towns – sister cities ==
Jēkabpils is twinned with:

- Czerwionka-Leszczyny, Poland
- Maardu, Estonia
- Melle, Germany
- Myrhorod, Ukraine
- Qaraçuxur, Azerbaijan
- Rokiškis, Lithuania
- Sokołów Podlaski, Poland

== Gallery ==
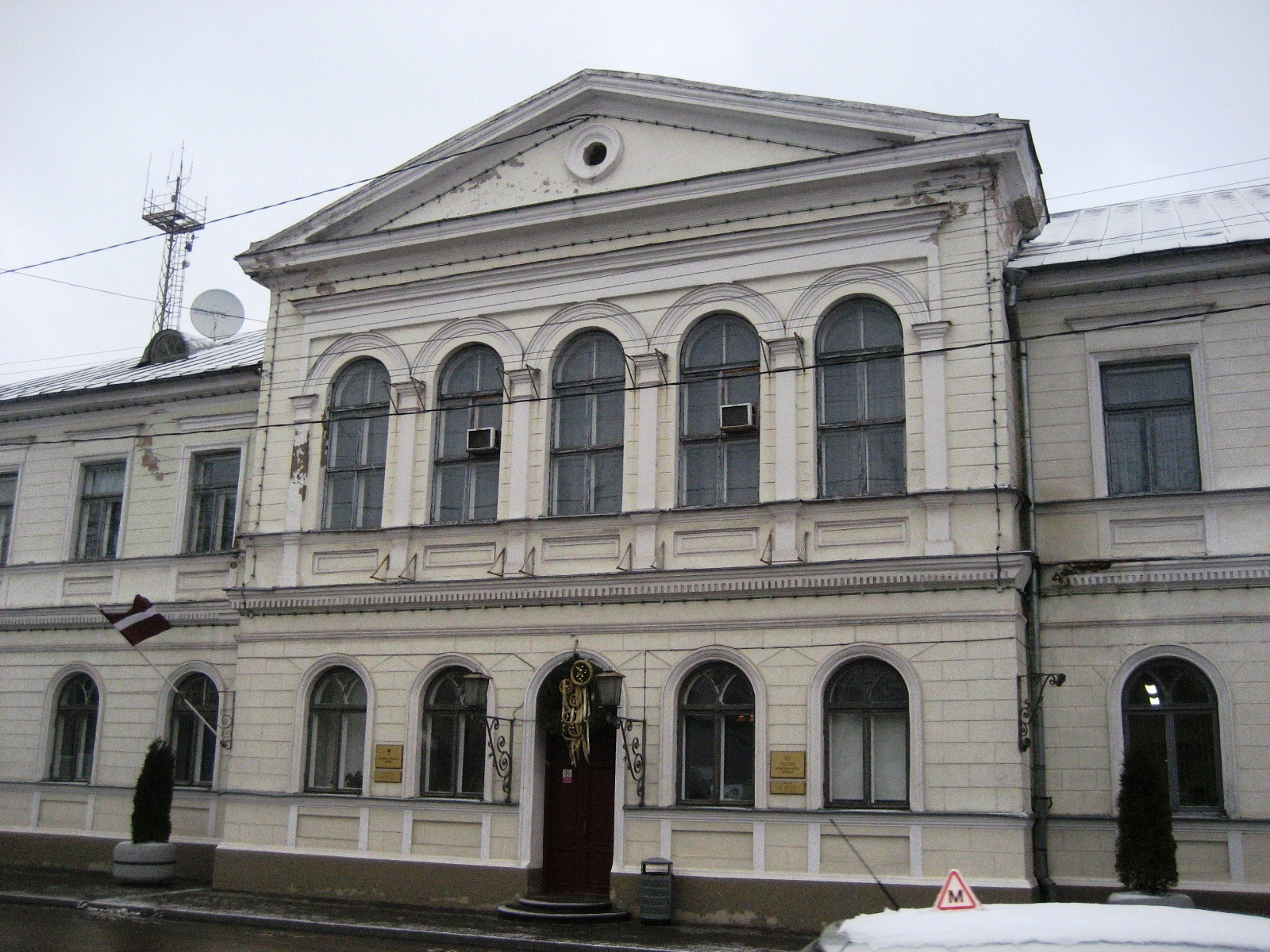
Jēkabpils city council

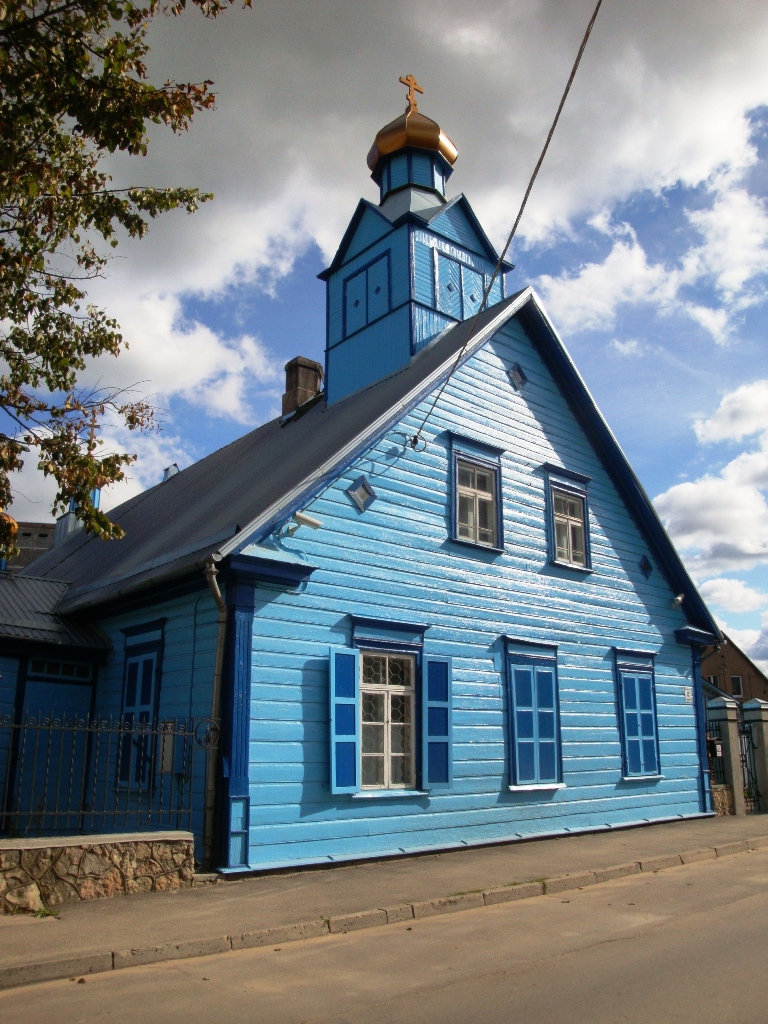
Old believers church in Jēkabpils

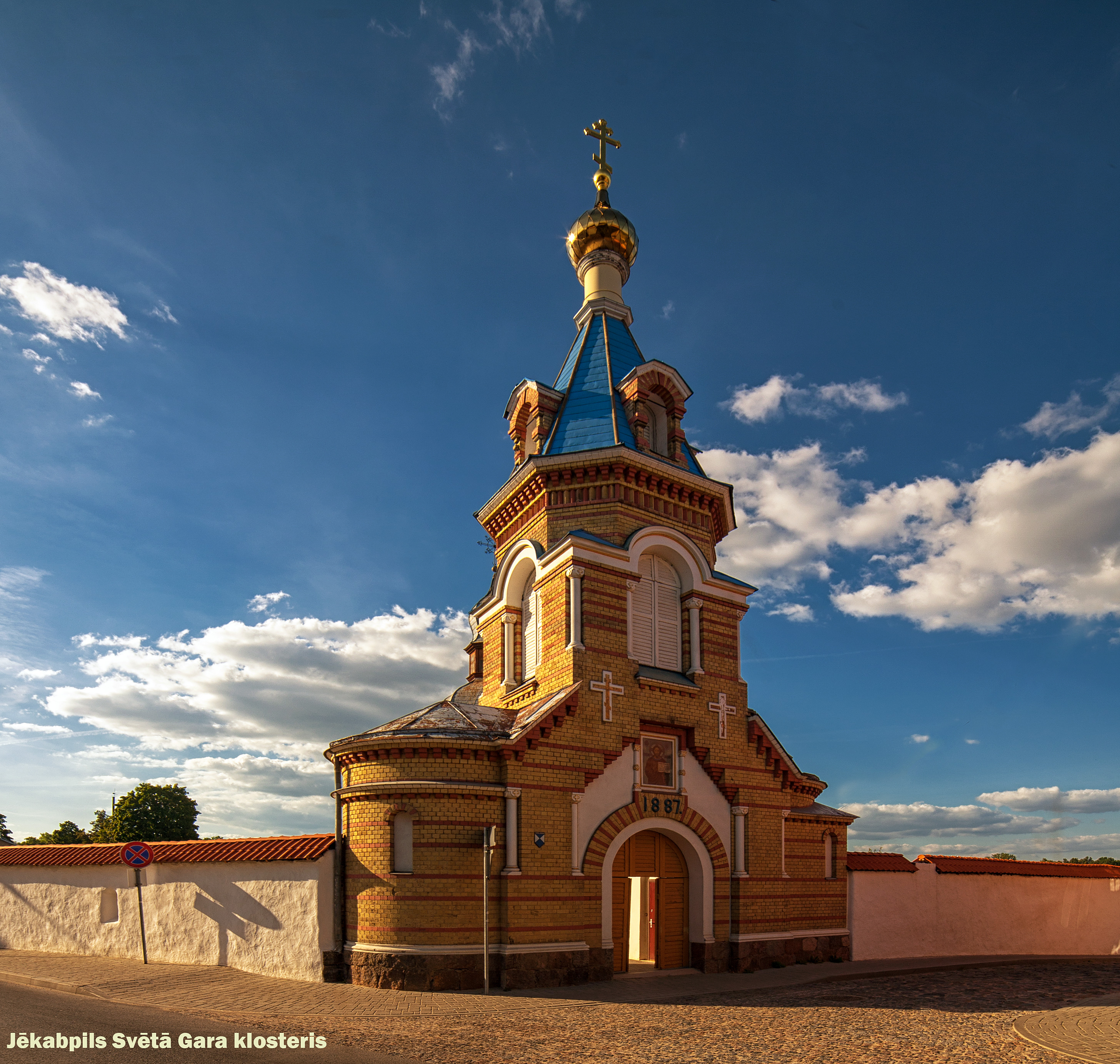
Bell tower of the orthodox Holy Spirit Monastery.

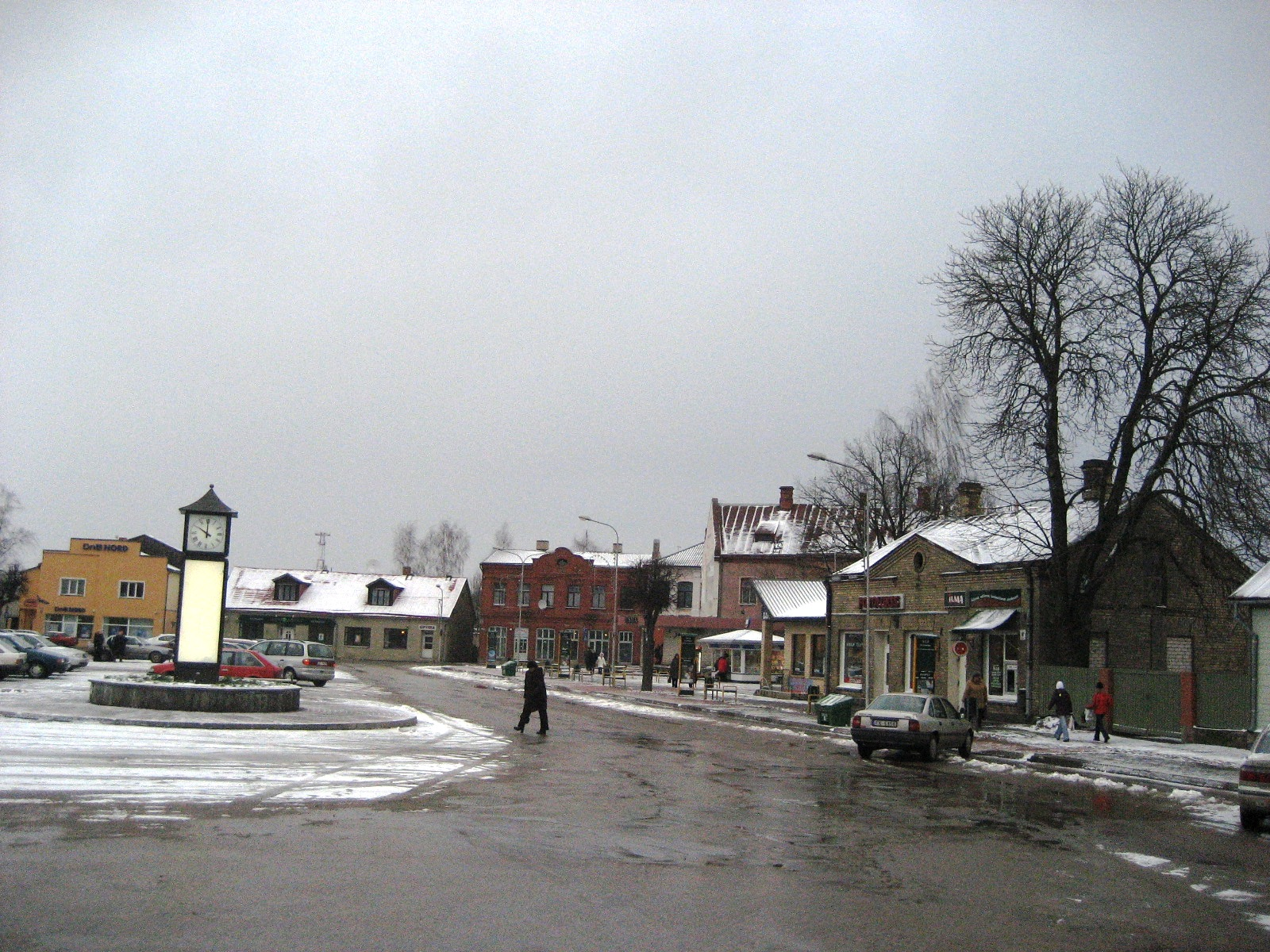
Jēkabpils central square

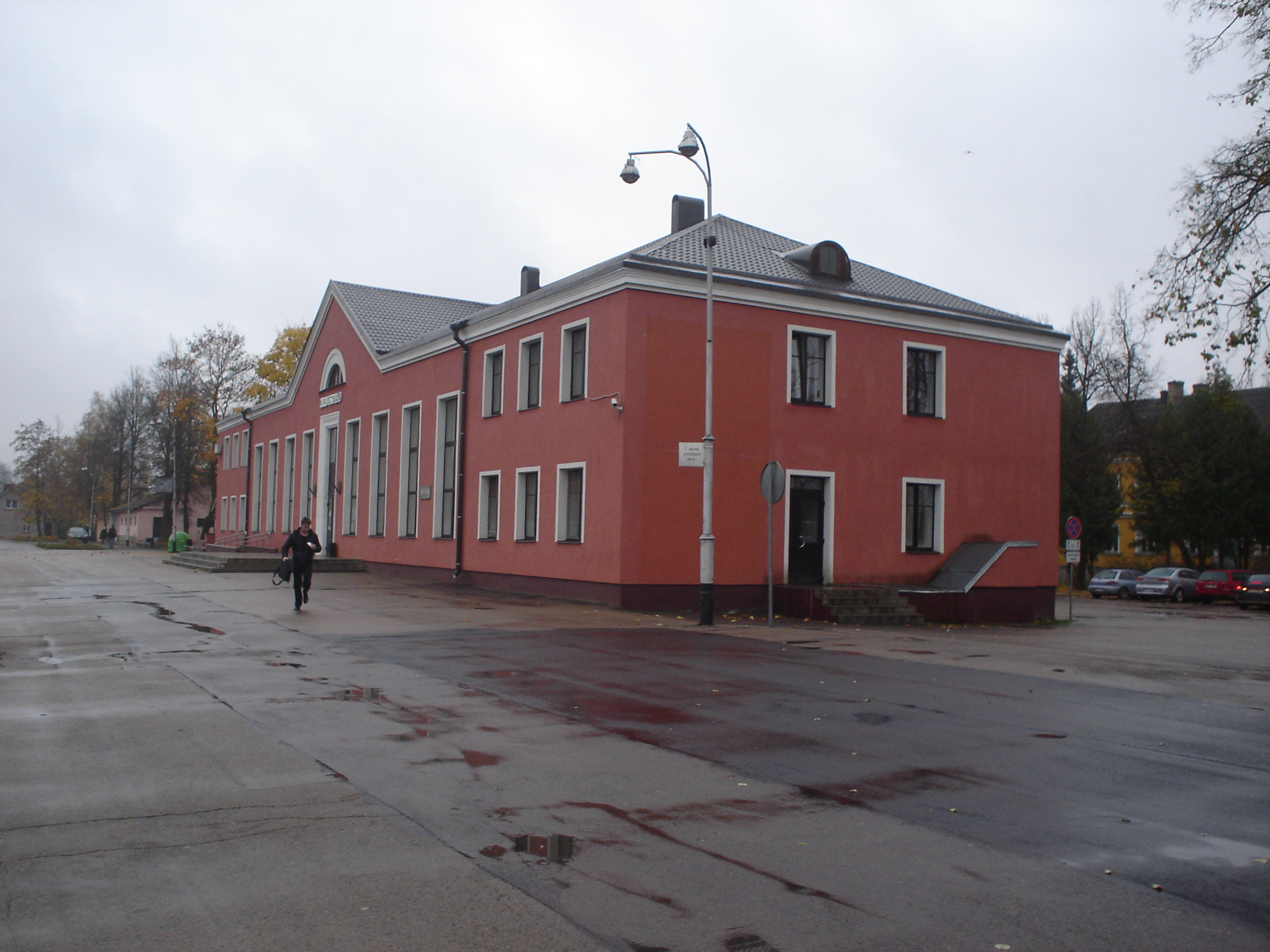
Krustpils railway station in Jēkabpils

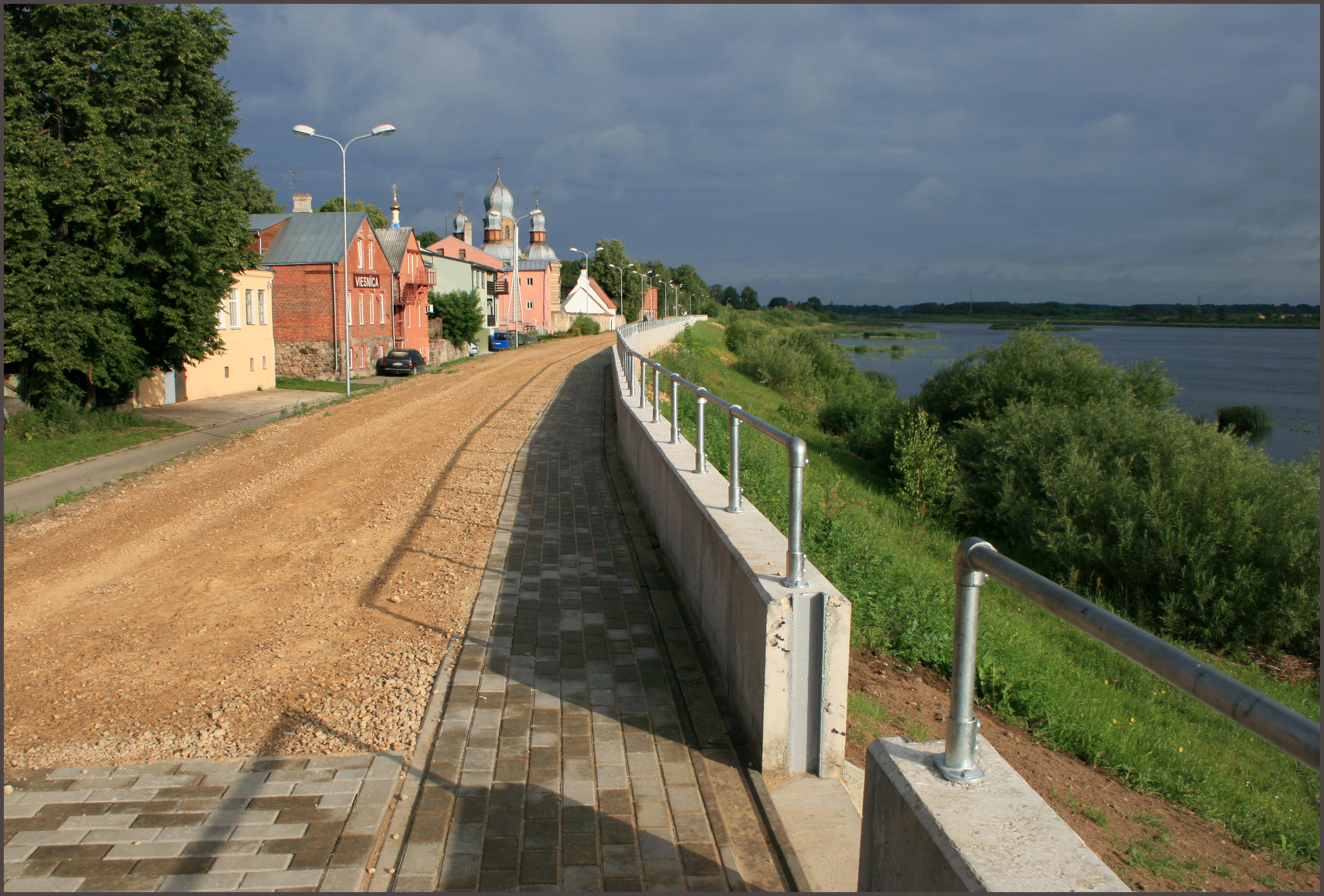
Pļaviņu iela (street) and Daugava River levee

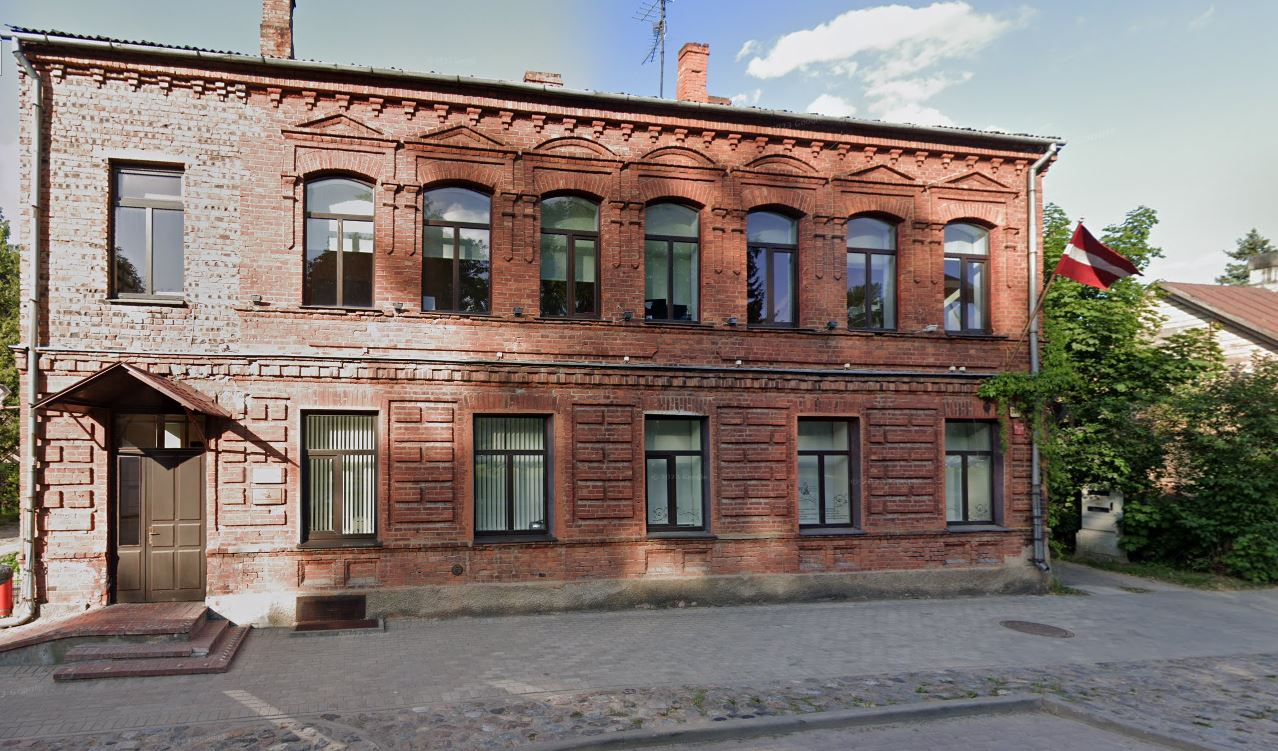
Typical 19th century red brick building in the centre of former Krustpils.

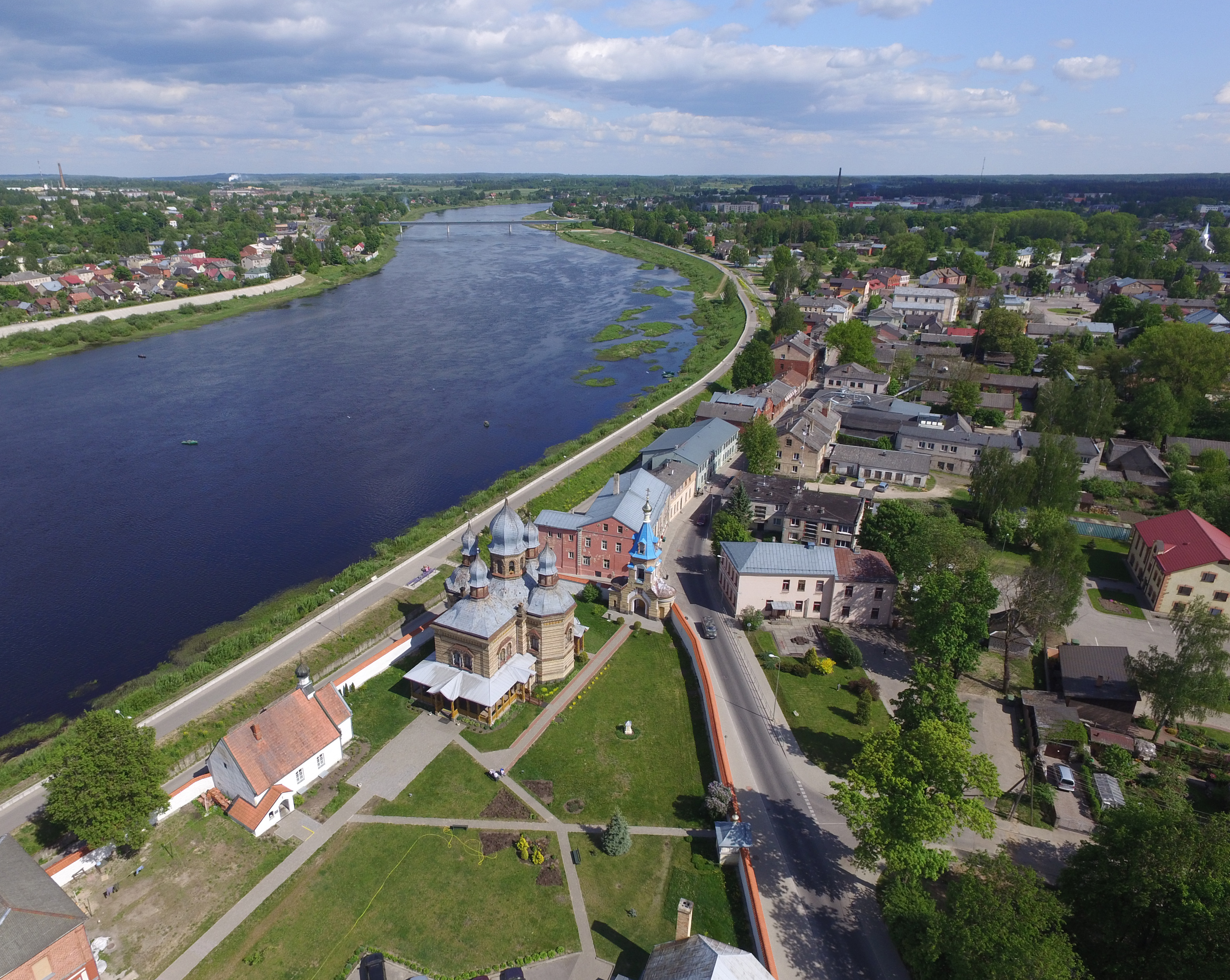
Areal view of the historic centre of Jēkabpils and orthodox Holy Spirit monastery.

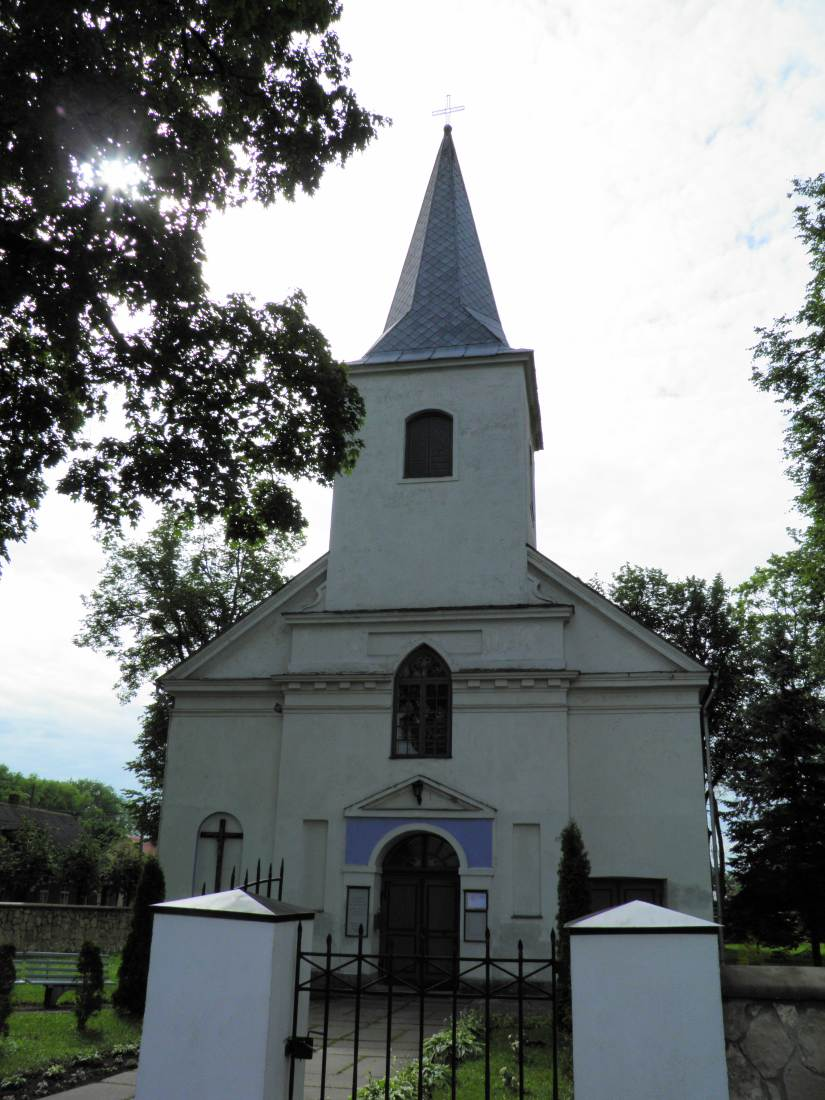
St. Michail lutheran church in Jēkabpils.

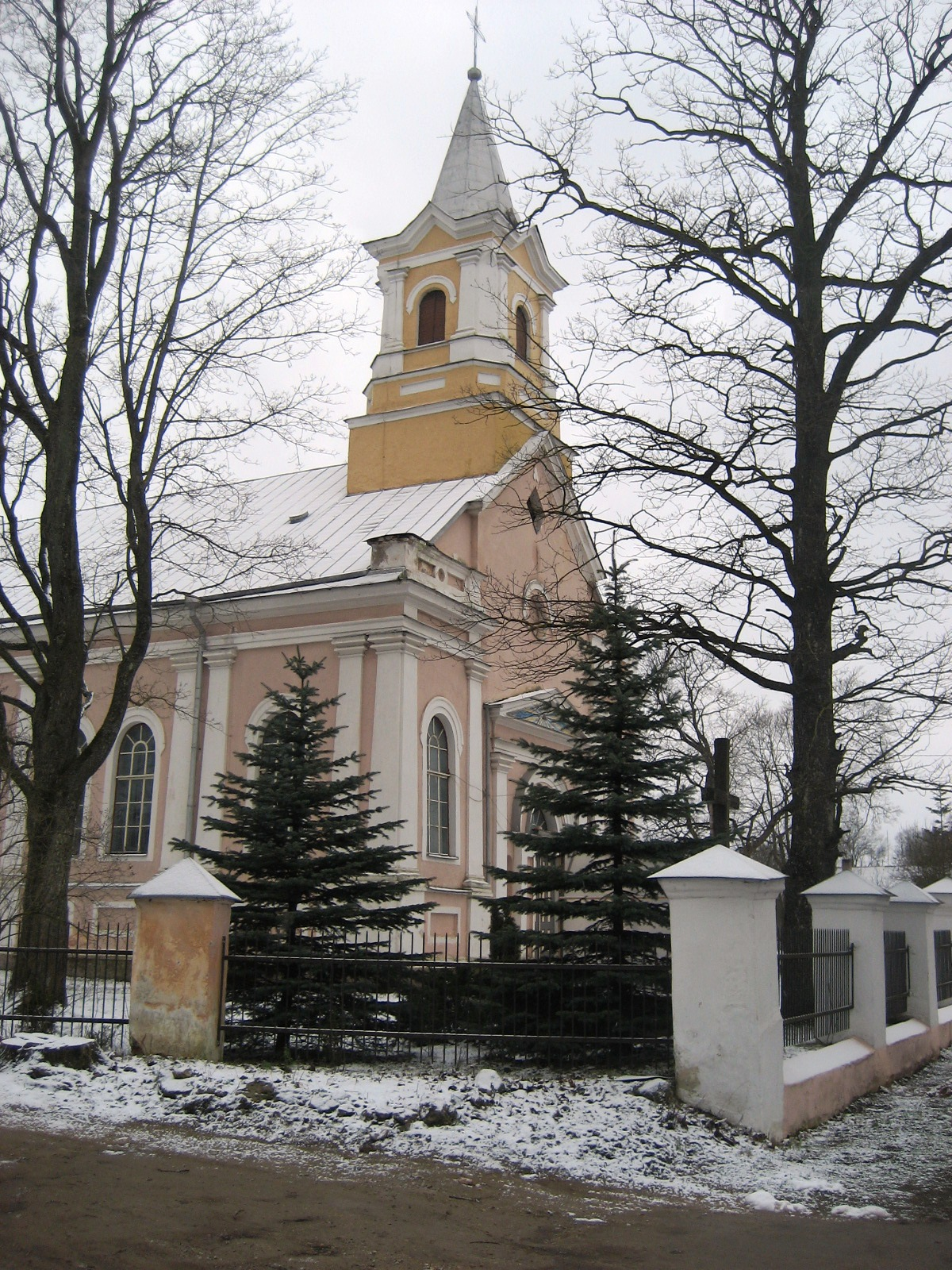
Roman Catholic church in Jēkabpils.
