= Battle of Jakobstadt =

Battle of the Great Northern War

Coordinates: 56°30′13″N 25°52′15″E

- Part of the Great Northern War
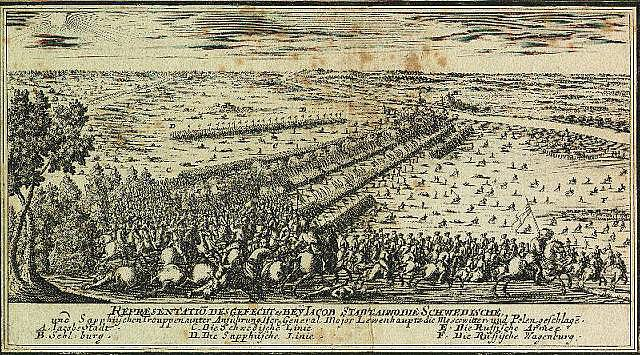
- The Battle of Jakobstadt (engraving from the Johann Christoph Brotze's collection)
Date	25 July 1704 (O.S.); 26 July 1704 (Swedish calendar); 5 August 1704 (N.S.)
Location	Jakobstadt, Duchy of Courland and Semigallia, (present day Jēkabpils, Latvia)
Result	Swedish victory

Belligerents
Swedish Empire	Polish–Lithuanian Commonwealth; Tsardom of Russia

Commanders and leaders
Adam Ludwig Lewenhaupt; Kazimierz Jan Sapieha	Michał Serwacy Wiśniowiecki; Grzegorz Antoni Ogiński

Strength
5,000: 3,000 Swedish; 2,000 Lithuanian	15,000: 10,000 Polish; 5,000 Russian

Casualties and losses
420: 238 killed 181 wounded	3,000: 2,300 killed 517 captured

The Battle of Jakobstadt (Lithuanian: Jėkabpilio mūšis, Latvian: Kauja pie Jēkabpils, Swedish: Slaget vid Jakobstadt, Polish: Krzyżbork) was fought in the Great Northern War. It took place on 25 July 1704 (O.S.) / 26 July 1704 (Swedish calendar) / 5 August 1704 (N.S.) between a Swedish army under Adam Ludwig Lewenhaupt and a combined Polish/Russian force under Great Hetman Michał Serwacy Wiśniowiecki at the town of Jēkabpils (German: Jakobstadt) in the Duchy of Courland and Semigallia. The Swedes were victorious.

== Battle ==
Lewenhaupt divided his troops into two parts. The first formed by the Swedes and the second formed by the Lithuanians commanded by General Sapieha. The commander-in-chief of the Swedes did not intend for the Lithuanians to bear the brunt of the battle, only the Lithuanian cavalry could pursue the Russo-Poles after a hypothetical easy Swedish victory.

After disposing the troops, the Swedes marched on a broad front over the Russian lines. In the center, some battalions advanced too far and were repulsed.

Encouraged by the initial successes of the Swedes, Sapieha's son advanced with his Lithuanian contingent on the Russians. This interference with the order of the battle meant that the Russians gained the upper hand in this part of the battle and the Lithuanians already saw the battle as lost. They left the battlefield in a panic.

The Swedes retreated and reorganized, and launched a second attack in perfect battle order. This attack had the support of artillery, which quickly put the Poles to flight, leaving only the Russians on the battlefield. The sun was turning and it was facing the Russians, obstructing their sight of the enemy, and it was not possible for them to know where and with what force they were attacking the Swedes. Lewenhaupt managed with an iron fist to regain control of his troops and ordered a simultaneous salvo of all battalions on the Russian battle line. When the smoke of the powder cleared, the damage caused by the Swedish fire could be seen. The battlefield was covered by dead and wounded Russians. The remaining Russian troops retreated to their camp where they formed a circle with the food chariots, so that they could easily repel the cavalry attack and inflict considerable losses on the Swedish horsemen.
