= Sēlpils (disambiguation) =

Sēlpils is a village in Sala Municipality, Latvia.

Sēlpils may also refer to:

- Sēlpils Parish, Latvia
- A former name of Vecsēlpils ("old Sēlpils"), a village in Latvia
- Sēlpils Castle, an ancient castle, Latvia
- Sēlpils (city), a mediaeval city by the castle
