= Battle of Selburg =

Battle of the Polish–Swedish War

- Part of the Polish–Swedish War (1626–1629)
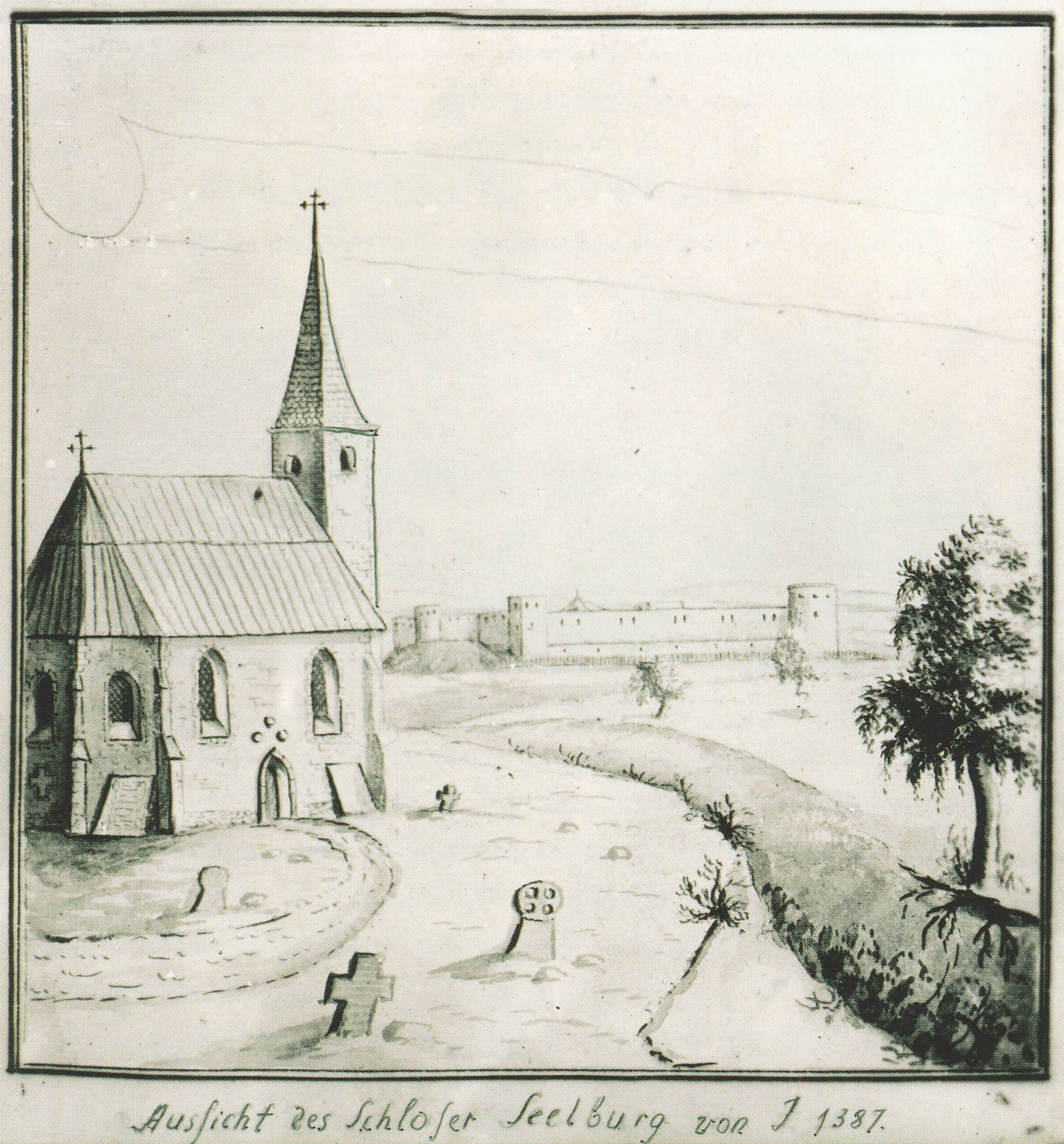
- Engraving of the Sēlpils Castle
Date	September 30, 1626
Location	Selburg, Selonia (Latvia) 56°35′14″N 25°38′25″E
Result	Swedish victory

Belligerents
Swedish Empire	Polish–Lithuanian Commonwealth

Commanders and leaders
(Swedish Empire) Jacob De la Gardie (Swedish Empire) Gustav Horn	(Polish–Lithuanian Commonwealth) Aleksander Gosiewski (Polish–Lithuanian Commonwealth) Stefan Pac

Strength
Selburg: unknown Wenden: 2,500	Selburg: around 2,000; Wenden: 600–700

The Battle of Selburg was fought during the Polish–Swedish War (1626–1629), between Sweden and the Polish–Lithuanian Commonwealth in September 1626. The Polish forces under Aleksander Gosiewski managed to recapture Selburg (Polish sources: Zelbork) from the Swedes earlier in 1626 and stationed their troops in the castle. In response the Swedish general Jacob De la Gardie gathered his force to once again capture the town for the Swedes.

== Prelude ==
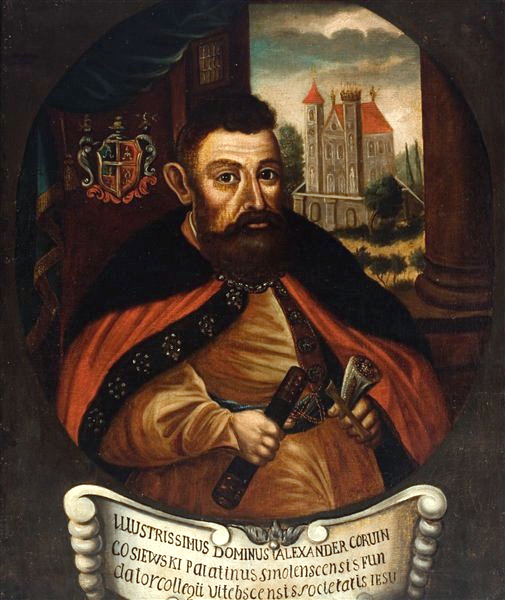
Aleksander Gosiewski, the Polish military commander at the battle.

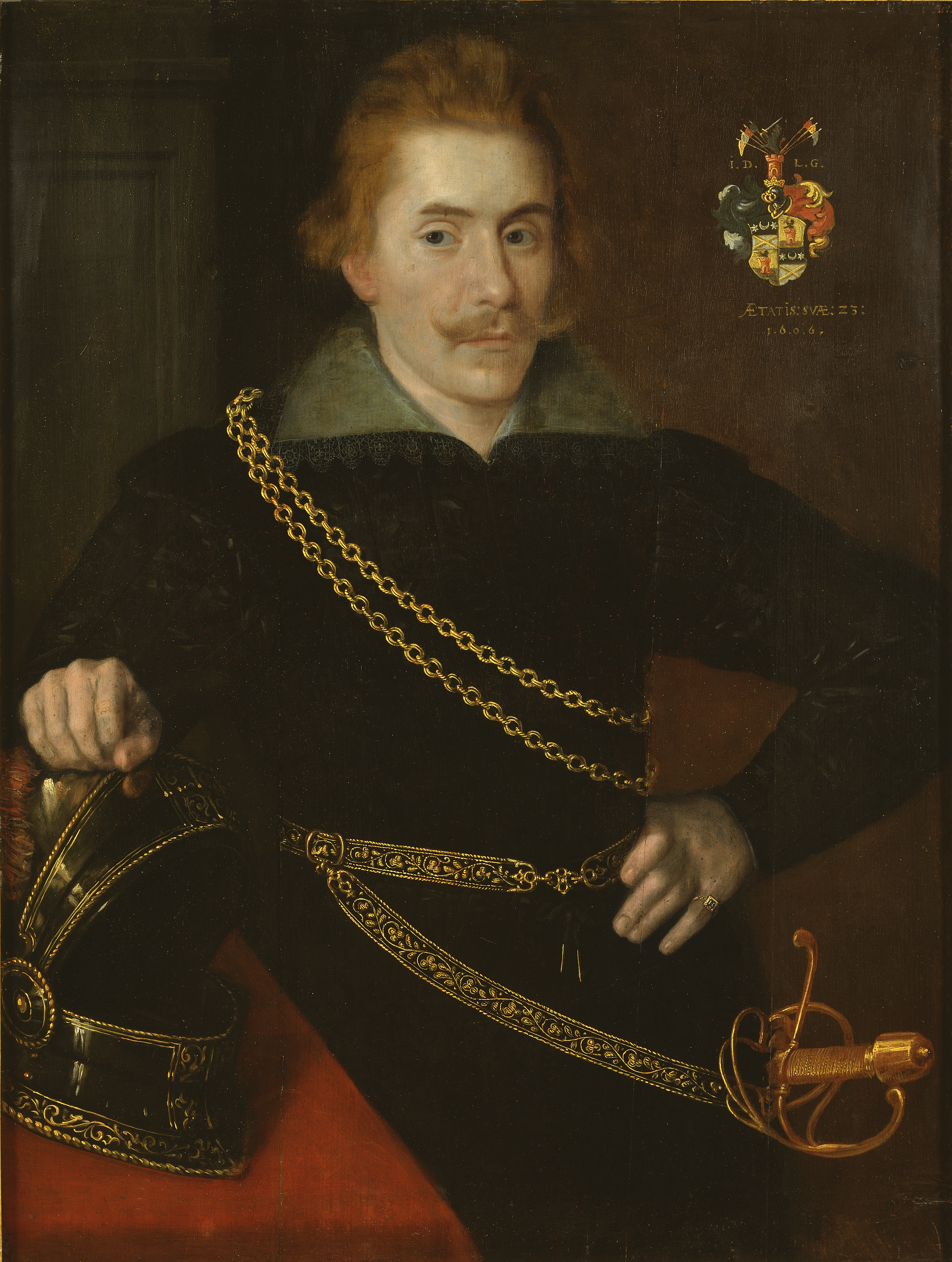
Jacob De la Gardie, the Swedish military commander at the battle.

In 1625 the Swedish royal army under king Gustavus Adolphus swept through Livonia and subsequently captured strategically important towns gaining advantageous footholds before the upcoming truce which ended the Polish–Swedish War (1600–1629). Some of these were Kokenhausen and Selburg. Gustavus then entered Prussia in 1626, in an attempt to achieve a decisive victory against the Poles under the command of Sigismund III Vasa. However, Livonia still remained a theater of war, and the Swedish king left Jacob De la Gardie as first in command, and Gustav Horn as second, to defend his conquers. In 1626, a Polish army under Aleksander Gosiewski sieged the city of Selburg and captured it just a few days later. The shortage of water was one of the primary factors behind the surrender. De la Gardie then planned to recapture the city as it was of great strategic importance and the key to defense of the Swedish held Kokenhausen, further up the Daugava River.

== Battles of Selburg and Wenden ==
The Polish army had established a strong foothold near Selburg after its capture and Swedish general De la Gardie executed successful cavalry assaults on their positions which inflicted significant casualties. This increased his confidence in the Swedish cavalry which, "as he thought", now matched up well against the cavalry of the Polish–Lithuanian Commonwealth which had been perceived as invincible thus far in the Polish–Swedish War (1600–1611). De la Gardie desired to cross Daugava in order to establish contact and engage with the bulk of the Polish army. He sent Gustav Horn and a detachment of reiters to cross further to the West of the river to cover his flank and with his own force he attacked across the bridgehead where he sent 600 musketeers to encounter two banners Hajduks and three banners of Germans mercenaries positioned there on the nearby hills, which after a fierce fighting were routed with a loss of 70 killed, 60 captured and two banners.

De la Gardie then started to shell the Polish entrenchments near Selburg with two 12-pounder guns, which proved quite successful; the Polish forces of about 2,000 soldiers were caught by surprise and a riot arose in the camp. Finally on the following morning the Poles managed to return fire with their cannons but it was too late – the fire did not have any major impact on the Swedes and the critical situation forced the vulnerable Polish forces to ask for a ceasefire. However, De la Gardie refused. As a result, the Poles destroyed the city walls of Selburg and then rapidly retreated towards Bauske with a loss of about 300 men during the battle (according to Swedish sources of Polish captured and deserters).

Contemporaneously, on the same day (September 30), Swedish general Gustav Horn fought another battle nearby, just east of Wenden (not to be confused with the battle at Wenden between Horn and Gosiewski just two months later on December 3) with an army of 2,500 against Stefan Pacs inferior force of just 600–700 soldiers. Outnumbered in this encounter, as Gosiewski was against De la Gardie, Pac had to retreat.

== Aftermath ==
The Swedish victory at Selburg resulted in yet another recapture of the city. However, due to problems with provisioning his troops, Jacob De la Gardie couldn't pursue the retreating Polish army. Instead, the soldiers started repairing the damages done to the fortifications and subsequently built a bridge across Daugava near Kokenhausen. After a while, the shortage of supplies forced De la Gardie to withdraw towards Polish-held Dünaburg (now Daugavpils) where he arrived on October 4. Later on October 9 he ordered a storm of the fort which proved quite successful with a loss of just five men dead and six wounded. The Polish casualties amounted to about 230 dead and 250 captured.

== Sources ==
- Isacson, Claes-Göran, ed. (2006). Vägen till Stormakt (in Swedish). Stockholm: Norstedts. ISBN 91-1-301502-8.
- Sveriges historia under Gustaf II Adolphs regering, Volym 2, Abraham Cronholm
- Swedish work Sveriges Krig 1611-1632, staff historians.
- Polish book Wojna inflancka 1625-1629, Henryk Wisner.
