= Prienai =

City in Suvalkija Region, Lithuania

- City
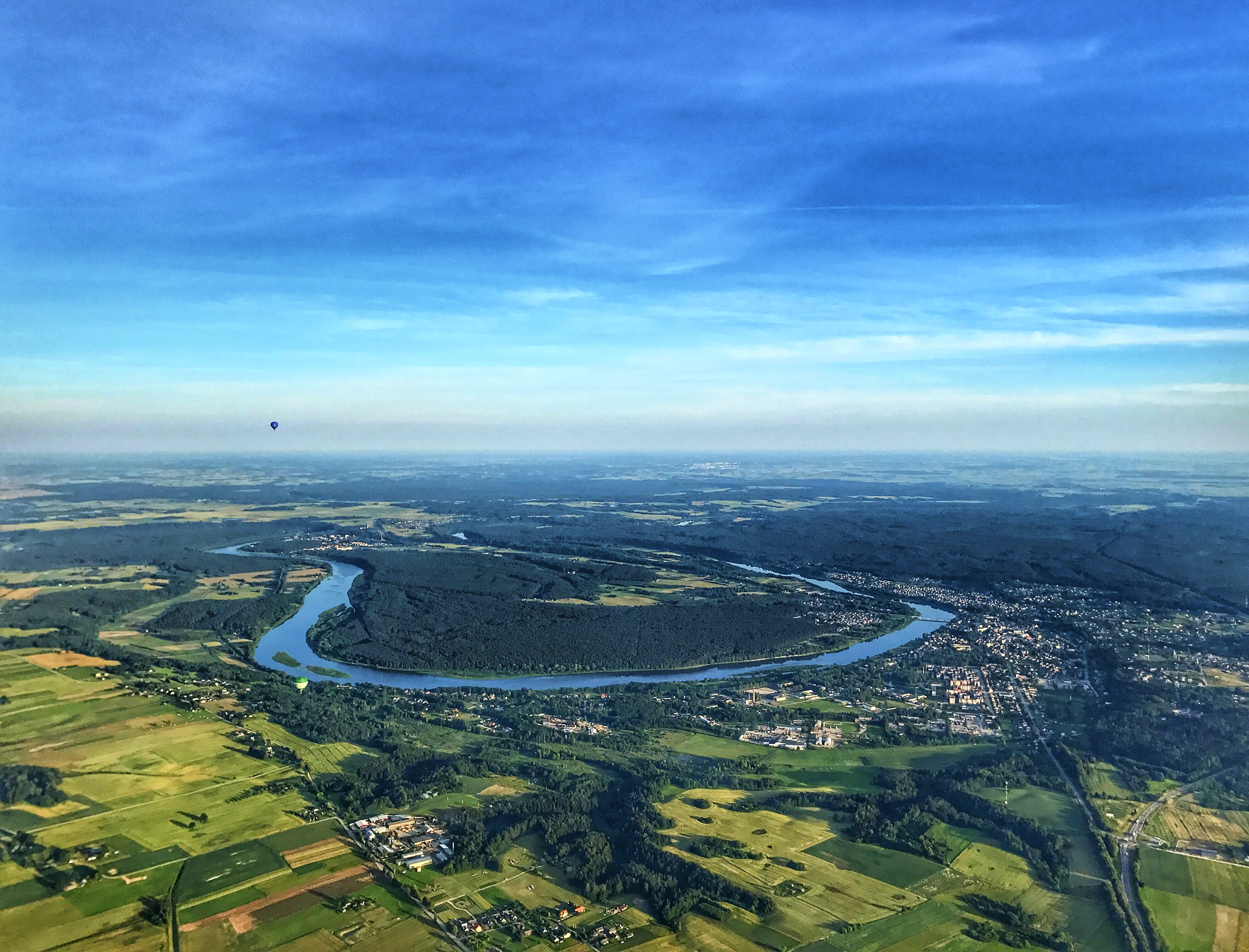
- Panorama of Prienai from air

- Coat of arms

- Location of Prienai
- Coordinates: 54°38′0″N 23°56′30″E
- Country: Lithuania
- Ethnographic region: Suvalkija
- County: Kaunas County
- Municipality: Prienai district municipality
- Eldership: Prienai city eldership
- Capital of: Prienai district municipality Prienai city eldership
- First mentioned: 1502
- Granted city rights: 1609

Area
  - Total: 7.87 km^{2} (3.04 sq mi)

Population (2023)
  - Total: 8,894
  - Density: 1,130/km^{2} (2,900/sq mi)
- Time zone: UTC+2 (EET)
  - Summer (DST): UTC+3 (EEST)

Prienai (Lithuanian pronunciation: [prʲɪ̂ɛ.nɐɪ̯ˑ]) is a city in Lithuania situated on the Nemunas River, 29 km (18 mi) south of Kaunas. In 2023, the city had 8,894 inhabitants. The name of the city is a derivative from the surname Prienas. Pociūnai Airport is associated with the city.

== History ==
=== Early history ===
The history of Prienai and its surroundings is closely linked to that of the Baltic region. Traces of sporadic human settlement go back to the Neolithic period. However, the vast majority of archeological findings such as tools and antiquity coins date back to the Iron Age, when the region of Prienai was inhabited by early Baltic tribes. Lush forests, strategically useful valleys, and stunningly beautiful banks of the Nemunas River were among the main reasons why the area became dotted with 28 hillforts, many of which were relatively densely populated thousands of years ago.

=== Grand Duchy of Lithuania ===
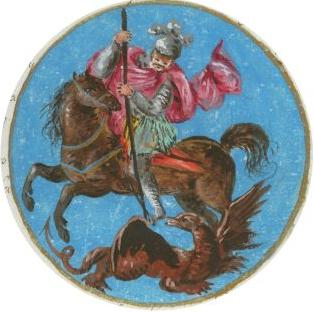
Prienai coats of arms in 1791

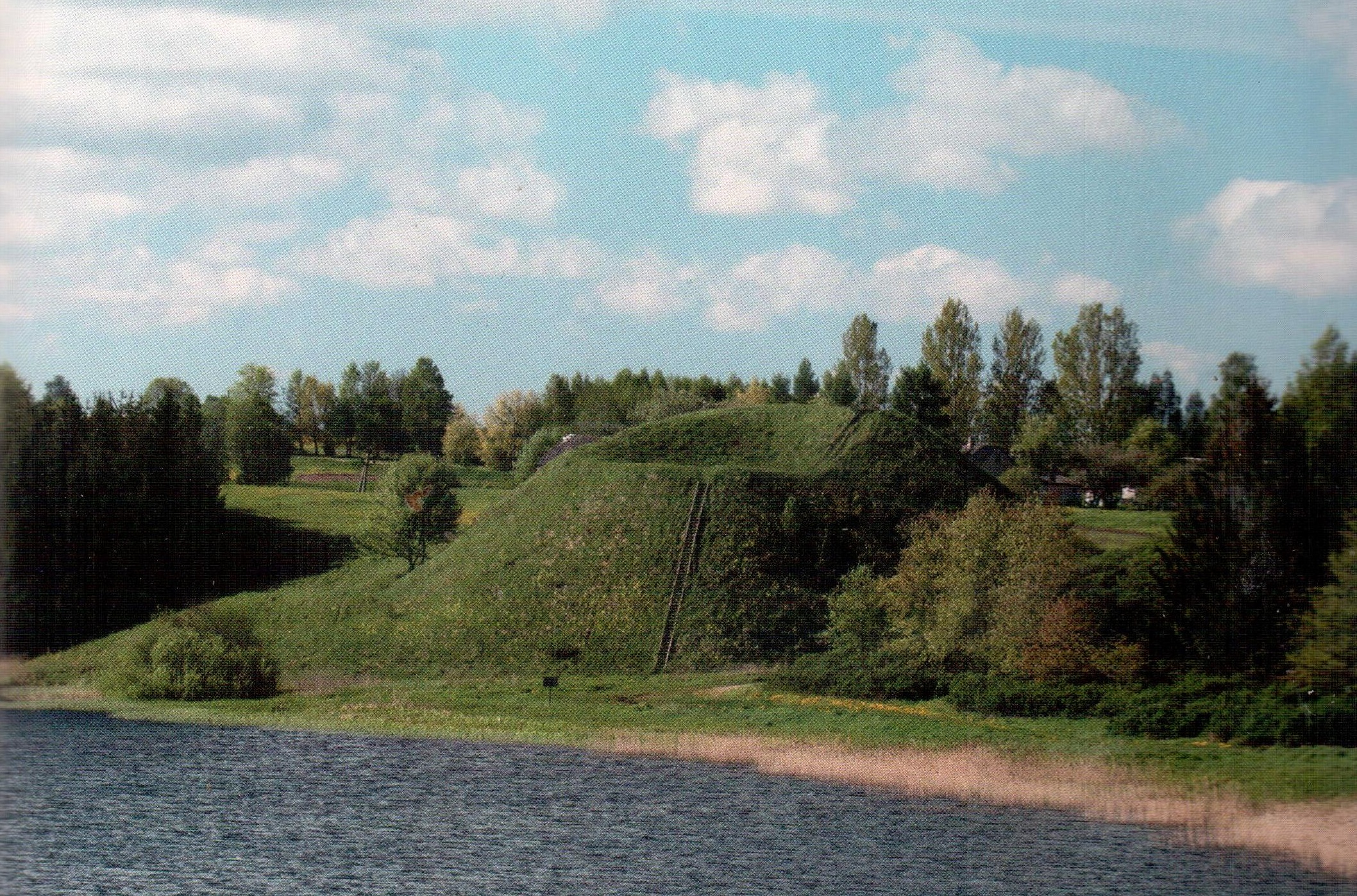
The Paukščiai mound is one of the many established in the area.

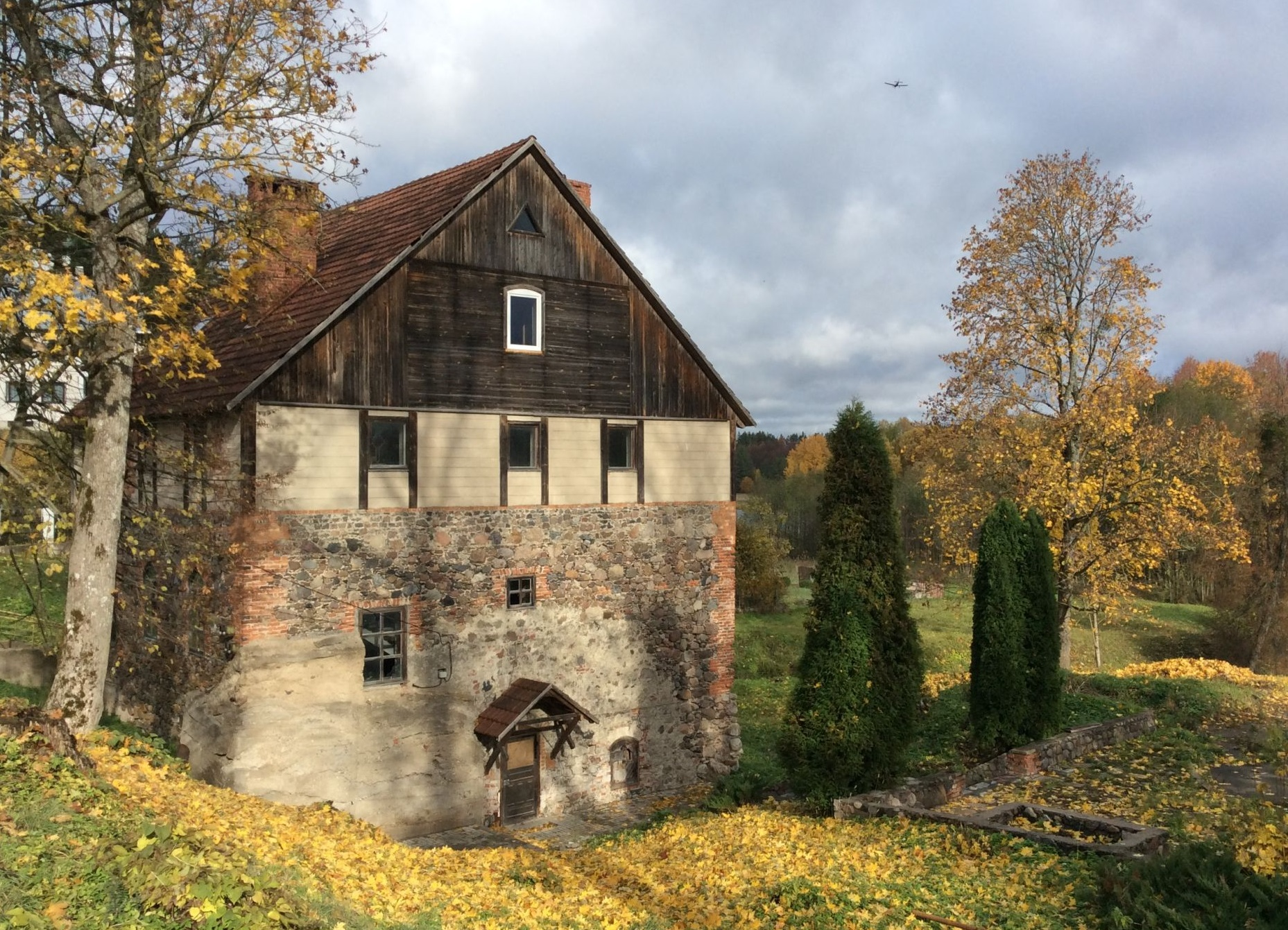
The remnants of the old paper mill.

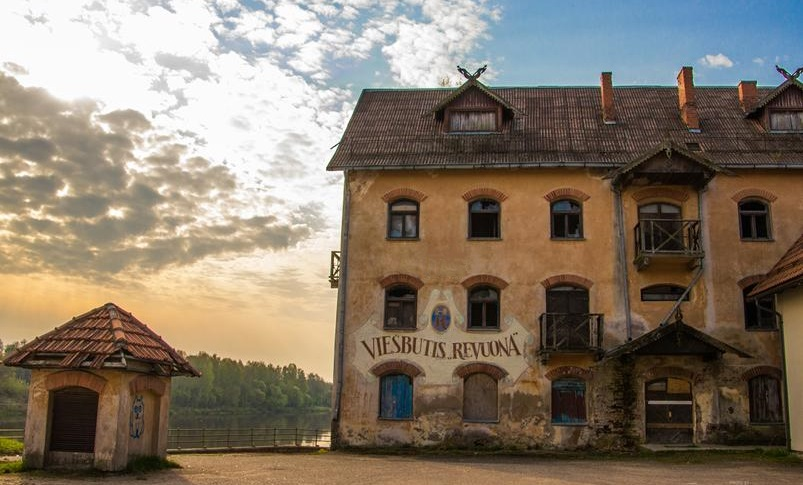
The remains of a water mill, built on the grounds of the old Prienai manor house.

The first documented mention of Prienai is in 1502, when the Grand Duke of Lithuania Alexander gave the land of Prienai to the noble Mykolas Glinskis, who, following his exile from the Grand Duchy of Lithuania, became the tutor of his nephew Ivan the Terrible. In 1609, the city was granted the Magdeburg rights, though they were greatly expanded in 1791 by the Grand Duke of Lithuania Stanislaw II Augustus. The city's arms showing St. George killing the dragon was granted in the same year. St. George was one of the patron saints of the Grand Duchy of Lithuania.

In 1579, Prienai was given by Grand Duke of Lithuania Stephen Báthory to the Hungarian nobleman Gabriel Bekes, brother of the more famed Gáspár Bekes, for his loyal participation in the Livonian War. The Bekes family ruled Prienai for the next two decades. Afterwards, it became the property of another Hungarian nobleman named Kaspar Horvat. In 1616, the Lithuanian nobleman and politician Stefan Pac, who would later become the Deputy Chancellor of the Grand Duchy of Lithuania, acquired Prienai. He and his sons Stanislovas and Mikołaj Stefan Pac owned it up until 1643.

For almost one and a half centuries, Prienai was ruled by the Butler family. In 1661, Count Gothard Wilhelm Butler, a Lithuanian nobleman of distant Scottish descent, built the Prienai castle. However, in 1701, during the Great Northern War, the castle together with its amenities was completely destroyed. In the early 18th century, the city somewhat recovered from the devastation of the Great Northern War, and in the place of the former castle, the Butler family had built a spacious two-storeyed Baroque styled manor house. On the ground floor, there was a large guest-hall and 16 rooms. On the first floor, there were 11 additional rooms and a sizable great hall. Yet over the course of the next century, the Prienai manor house was gradually abandoned. At the onset of the 20th century, only rubble remained. The 3rd Lithuanian Infantry Regiment was stationed in the town in 1792.

The first wooden church in Prienai was built in 1604. Thanks to the active personal involvement of a priest named Vaitiekus Izdebskis, seventy years later, a newer and much larger church was built to replace the old one. The present Baroque styled church was built in 1750, though it was refurbished and slightly expanded in 1875.

=== Prussia, Napoleon and the Russian Empire ===
Following the third partition of the Polish–Lithuanian Commonwealth in 1795, Prienai was invaded and occupied by Prussia. Prussia ruled there during the years 1795-1807 and made Prienai part of New East Prussia. At the end of the eighteenth century, Prienai underwent rapid economic growth. During that time, a glass factory and a paper mill, one of the largest in Lithuania, were established near the town. The paper mill produced extraordinary high quality white, coloured, and wrapping paper, which was often exported to cities as distant as Warsaw and Saint Petersburg.

After Napoleon defeated Prussia, in 1807, Prussian-occupied Lithuanian territories were transferred to the newly established Polish Duchy of Warsaw. The Napoleonic Code was then introduced in this region, which abolished serfdom and guaranteed equality before the law.

Following the demise of Napoleon in 1815, and the Congress of Vienna, Prienai together with its surroundings, were annexed by the Russian Empire.

The town dwellers of Prienai, together with the inhabitants of neighbouring towns and villages, actively participated in the November Uprising of 1830-1831 and the January Uprising of 1863–1864, both of which sought to liberate Lithuanians from the Russian yoke.

=== Republic of Lithuania ===
Following Lithuania's restoration of independence in 1918, Prienai became the center of the county and witnessed unprecedented expansion. By 1937, Prienai had a population of around 4,200; there were 4 banks, 2 pharmacies, 121 shops, 5 mills, a number of sawmills and countless workshops in the city. At that time, the mayor of the city was Julius Greimas, the father of the world renowned Lithuanian-French literary scientist and semiotician Algirdas Julien Greimas. Yet despite the flurry of diverse economic activity, brewing was indisputably the most significant industry in Prienai. The Goldberg beer brewery was established back in 1868, and during the interwar period, its facilities dominated the urban landscape of the city. According to local contemporaries, the brewery produced one of the finest beers in Lithuania and its products were regularly exported to Latvia, Poland, and the Soviet Union. However, the brewery, together with most of its buildings, was completely destroyed by the German Luftwaffe during a bombing raid in June 1941.

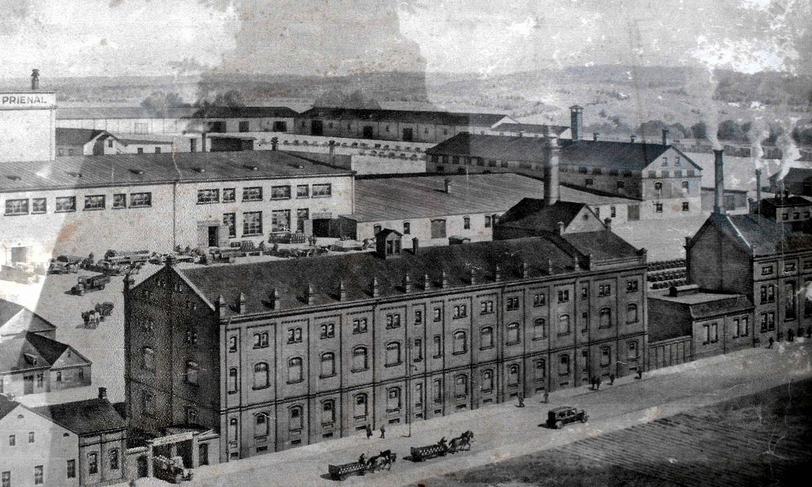
The Goldberg beer brewery.

=== World War II and its aftermath ===
During World War II, when it was occupied by German troops, Prienai lost many of its inhabitants. People emigrated or were expelled, while the Nazis killed the Jews. On August 27, 1941, 1,078 Jews from Prienai and surrounding areas were murdered in Prienai. The massacre was perpetrated by Rollkommando Hamann and local collaborators.

In the aftermath of World War II, Prienai was occupied by the Soviet Union and its population suffered additional losses. Throughout 1945–1946, the Soviets murdered 39 inhabitants from Prienai and its surroundings. On 22–23 May 1948, 1,019 Lithuanians from the Prienai area were forced by the Soviets into cattle trains and deported to Siberia. In 1949, 675 more local people were deported to Siberia. Most of the deportees either died there or suffered circumstances that never allowed them to return home.

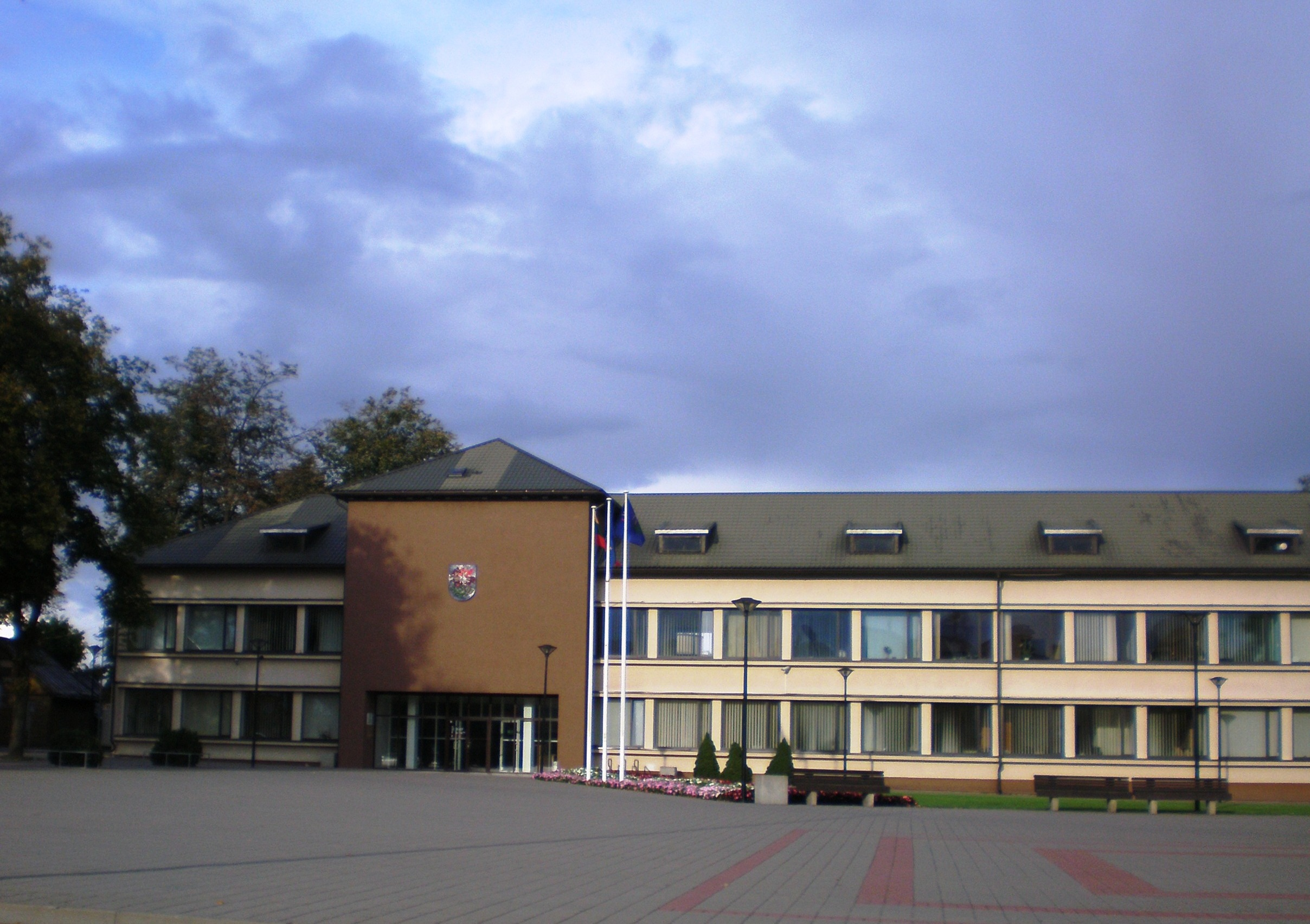
Prienai district municipality building

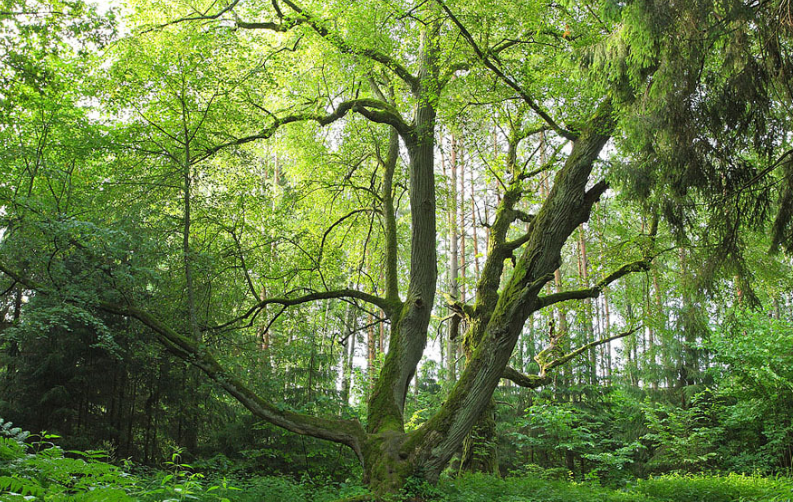
The city is surrounded by green forests and lush grasslands.

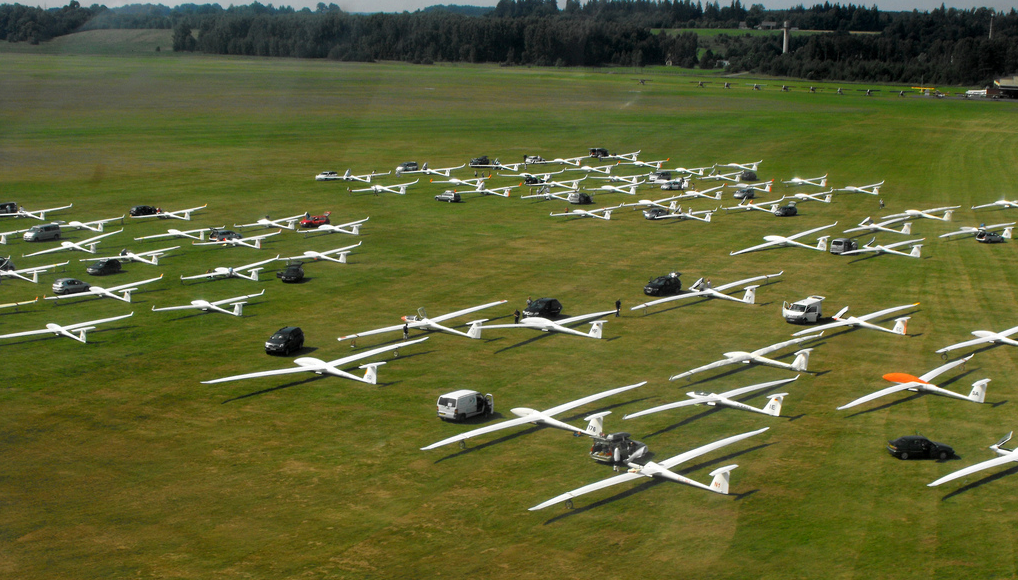
Gliders at the Pociūnai Airport.

== Notable people ==
- Bernard Revel (1885-1940), first President of Yeshiva University
- Bluma Zeigarnik (1900–1988), Russian psychologist
- Jonas Kazlauskas (1930–1970), Lithuanian scientist, philology professor of Vilnius University, historical grammatics and baltic philology researcher
- Justinas Marcinkevičius, poet
- Vincas Mykolaitis-Putinas, writer
- Matas Šalčius, writer, traveler
- Sonata Milušauskaitė, race walker
- Nikodemas Silvanavičius, painter

== Industry ==
AB Sportinė aviacija for a long time was the only glider factory in the Soviet Union. It was founded in 1969. The first Lithuanian glassfibre glider BK-7 "Lietuva" was built here.

== Sport ==
Prienai is home to BC Vytautas (formerly BC Prienai / BC Rūdupis / BC Tonybet), a basketball team that competes in the Lithuanian Basketball League.

== Twin towns – sister cities ==
Prienai is twinned with:

- Asikkala, Finland
- Bitetto, Italy
- Busk, Ukraine
- (Georgia (country)) Dusheti, Georgia
- Kętrzyn (rural gmina), Poland
- Lubań, Poland
- Parczew, Poland
- Talsi, Latvia
- Türi, Estonia

== Distances to other cities ==
These distances are as the crow flies and therefore do not represent actual overland distances.

In Lithuania:

- (Lithuania) Kaunas: 29 km (18 mi)
- (Lithuania) Vilnius: 86 km (53 mi)
- (Lithuania) Šiauliai: 150 km (93 mi)
- (Lithuania) Klaipėda: 214 km (133 mi)

In Europe:

- (Poland) Białystok: 175 km (109 mi)
- (Belarus) Minsk: 249 km (155 mi)
- (Latvia) Riga: 257 km (160 mi)
- (Poland) Warsaw: 331 km (206 mi)
- (Estonia) Tallinn: 536 km (333 mi)
- (Finland) Helsinki: 619 km (385 mi)
- (Sweden) Stockholm: 632 km (393 mi)
- (Denmark) Copenhagen: 732 km (455 mi)
- (Germany) Berlin: 735 km (457 mi)
