= Halshka Hulevychivna =

Ukrainian Orthodox saint

Saint Elizabeth (Yelyzaveta) Hulevych
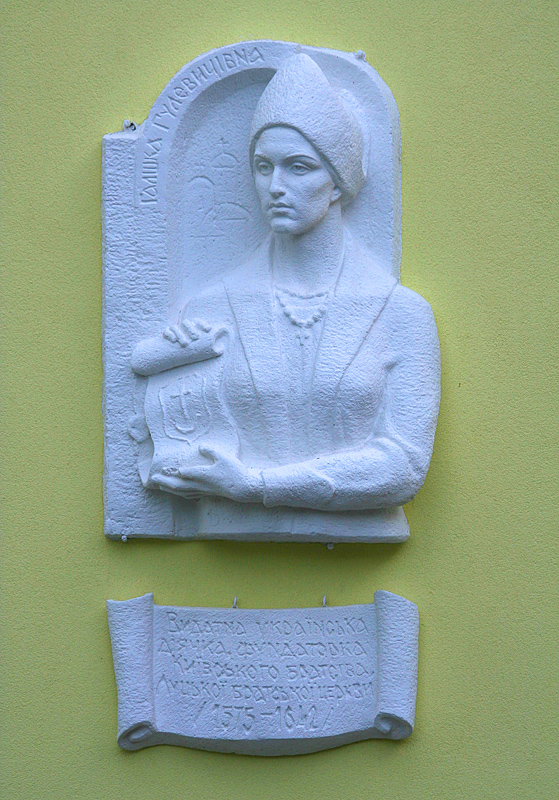
- Memorial plaque to Halshka in Lutsk

Righteous
- Born: c. 1575 or 1577; Volhynian Voivodeship
- Died: 1642 (aged 65-67); Lutsk
- Venerated in: Orthodox Church of Ukraine
- Canonized: 22 November 2021 by Synod of the Orthodox Church of Ukraine
- Feast: 18 September

Yelyzaveta Vasylivna Hulevych (Ukrainian: Єлизавета Василівна Гулевич; Polish: Halszka (Halżbieta) Hulewicz), known as Halszka Hulevychowna (c. 1575 or 1577 – 1642, Lutsk, Volyn) was a noblewoman and philanthropist of the Nowina Polish coat of arms who founded the Kyiv Brotherhood Epiphany Monastery and the Kyiv Brotherhood School, from which the Kyiv-Mohyla Academy traces its history. She is now an Orthodox saint known for caring about the development of spirituality and enlightenment and bequeathing money to the Lutsk Brotherhood.

== Biography ==
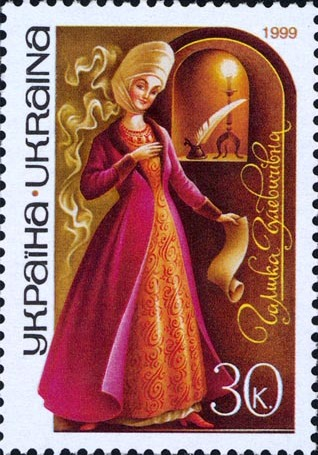
Halshka Hulevychivna on a Ukrainian post stamp

=== Before 1615 ===
Known under the Polish name Halszka, Hulevychivna came from the influential Hulevych noble family of the Polish Nowina coat of arms, known since the 15th century, whose representatives held various positions in Volhynia and other lands of the Polish–Lithuanian Commonwealth. The family reached high church positions and owned numerous settlements. They may have originated from Galicia.

The grandfather of Halshka Hulevychivna, Fedir (Theodosius) Hulevych, was a Volhynian Orthodox bishop of Lutsk and Ostroh, and had five sons. Halshka's father, Vasyl Hulevych of Zaturtsi, served as deputy starost of Volodymyr and wojski of Volhynia. From his three marriages, except Halshka, he had sons Andrii, Mykhailo, Vasyl and Benedict, and daughters Maria and Anna. Halszka was probably born in the village Zaturtsi in Volhynia, which was the property of her father, in the 1570s.

In 1594 Halszka married Krzysztof Pociej, who was the son of Hypatius Pociej, land judge (1580–1588) and castellan (1588–1593) of Berestya, who after 1593 served as Orthodox bishop of Volodymyr and Berestya and became one of the main initiators of the Union of Berestya, later becoming the Uniate Metropolitan of Kyiv. After the early death of her husband, Halszka Hulevychivna raised her daughter Kateryna, who in 1615 was married to Orsza khorunzhy named Mikołaj Mleczko.

In 1601/1602 Halshka married for a second time to Stefan Lozka, Marshal of Mozyr. Halszka at that time was about 30 years old; Stefan was 60. The couple had a son, Mykhailo, and lived in a family estate in Kyiv's Podil, not far from the city hall.

=== Donation ===
At the end of the 16th and beginning of the 17th centuries, printing houses and schools appeared in Ukrainian lands. They were supported by philanthropists, including Halshka.

On October 14, 1615, she compiled and signed a deed of donation, which on October 15 was entered into the Kyiv city books, entering into legal force. According to the donation, Halshka's house with lands in Kyiv were given for the purpose of foundation of a new monastery, a hospital, and a school for children of all classes.

The donation noted: "I, Halshka Hulevychivna, the wife of his Grace Mr. Stefan Lozka, Marshal of Mozyr, with the consent of his Grace to all the following, being healthy in body and mind, clearly voluntarily realize by this voluntary letter of mine that I, living constantly in the ancient holy Orthodox Church and reverently burning with zeal for her, out of love and friendliness for my brothers - the Ruthenian people and for the salvation of my soul from old times intended to do good to the Church of God <...> I give, donate and write off to the faithful and pious Christians of Ruthenian nation in the districts of Kyiv, Volyn and Bratslav, of class spiritual and secular: monks, priests and deacons of the monastic and lay ranks, illustrious princes, noble lords, gentry and Ruthenian people of any other rank and status..."

As prescribed, the deed indicated the boundaries of the donated estate, located not far from Kontraktova Square. In the donation, Halshka stipulated the purpose of the act:

All this — for a stauropegian monastery with cohabitation according to the order of Basil the Great, [and] also for the school for children, both gentry and bourgeois, and for any other way of charitable life that would <...> serve to educate and present the sciences to courteous children of the Christian people, and at the same time, for the inn for spiritual wanderers, so that the monastery, and the school, and the whole order would be guided by the law of the Eastern Church of the Greek Rite.

Thanks to the donation of Halshka Hulevychivna, the initiators of the Kyiv Brotherhood received an estate with land in Lower Kyiv, to build a monastery and a school. The development of the monastery was carried out by Isaiah Kopinsky a monk from the Monastery of the Caves, who founded a number of monasteries in Ukrainian lands, and whose name is mentioned in the donation. The school could have been housed in the house of Halshka Hulevychivna and Stefan Lozka, but the donation itself does not mention the building. By donating her estate, Halshka made it possible to open the Kyiv fraternal school, which, after the reform of Petro Mohyla, would play an important role in the history of Ukrainian education and culture.

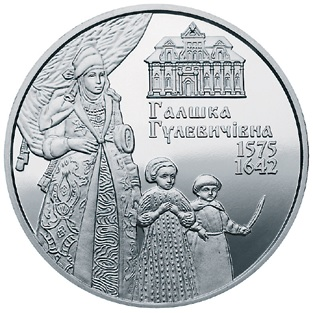
Reverse of the anniversary coin "Halshka Hulevychivna" from the National Bank of Ukraine, 2015

The original of the donation document is unknown to historians, and copies of Halshka's donation from the 17th century have not been found either. The oldest document is a handwritten copy from the copier of the Kyiv Brotherhood Monastery from the second half of the 18th century, which is stored in the Central State Historical Archives of Ukraine in Kyiv. In 1774, Metropolitan Gabriel of Kyiv handed it over to the Holy Synod along with copies of other documents kept at the Kyiv-Mohyla Academy. From these copies, Metropolitan Eugene of Kyiv compiled a collection that was kept until the beginning of the 20th century in the library of the Kyiv Theological Academy. The list from the donation was first published in 1846. Later, it was repeatedly reprinted and analyzed by historians (for example, in the works of Viktor Askochensky, Stepan Golubev, Nikolai Mukhin, Fyodor Titov).

Researcher Maksym Yaremenko noted that by the middle of the 18th century, the foundation of the academy was associated not with the donation, but with Metropolitan Petro Mohyla and Hetman Petro Sahaidachny. Halshka was first "remembered" in the mid-1760s, when professors of the academy faced a problem — the desire of the Cossack senior elite to radically reform the academy, turning it into a university. The Cossacks explained their interference in the affairs of an institution that was under ecclesiastical jurisdiction by the fact that it was founded by Sahaidachny. This forced the Mohyla Academy staff to resort to a deeper search for their roots, one of the results of which was the rediscovery of the figure of Halshka as the founder of the school. The history of the donation could help to prove that the academy was not founded by the hetman, and that its founders were not Cossacks, but a noble lady. Yaremenko also drew attention to the fact that there is no evidence, except for the assurance of the professors, that the original deed of gift appeared in some cases that required the involvement of documents from the academy and the Fraternal Monastery.

=== Return to Lutsk ===
After the death of her second husband in 1618, Halshka Hulevychivna became the guardian of her son Mykhailo, who inherited the parental village of Rozhiv after 1628. Leaving all the estates to her son, Halshka Hulevychivna returned to Lutsk, where she spent the last years of her life. Documents have been preserved about Halshka's legal and land affairs, estates and about the conversion of her son Michael Catholicism. In Lutsk, Halshka Hulevychivna actively participated in the life of the local Orthodox brotherhood, and in 1641, shortly before her death made a will, according to which she bequeathed almost all her funds and money owed to her to the needs of the Lutsk Brotherhood Monastery and its church.

Halshka Hulevychivna died in 1642 and was buried in the crypt of the Lutsk Brotherhood's Holy Cross Church.

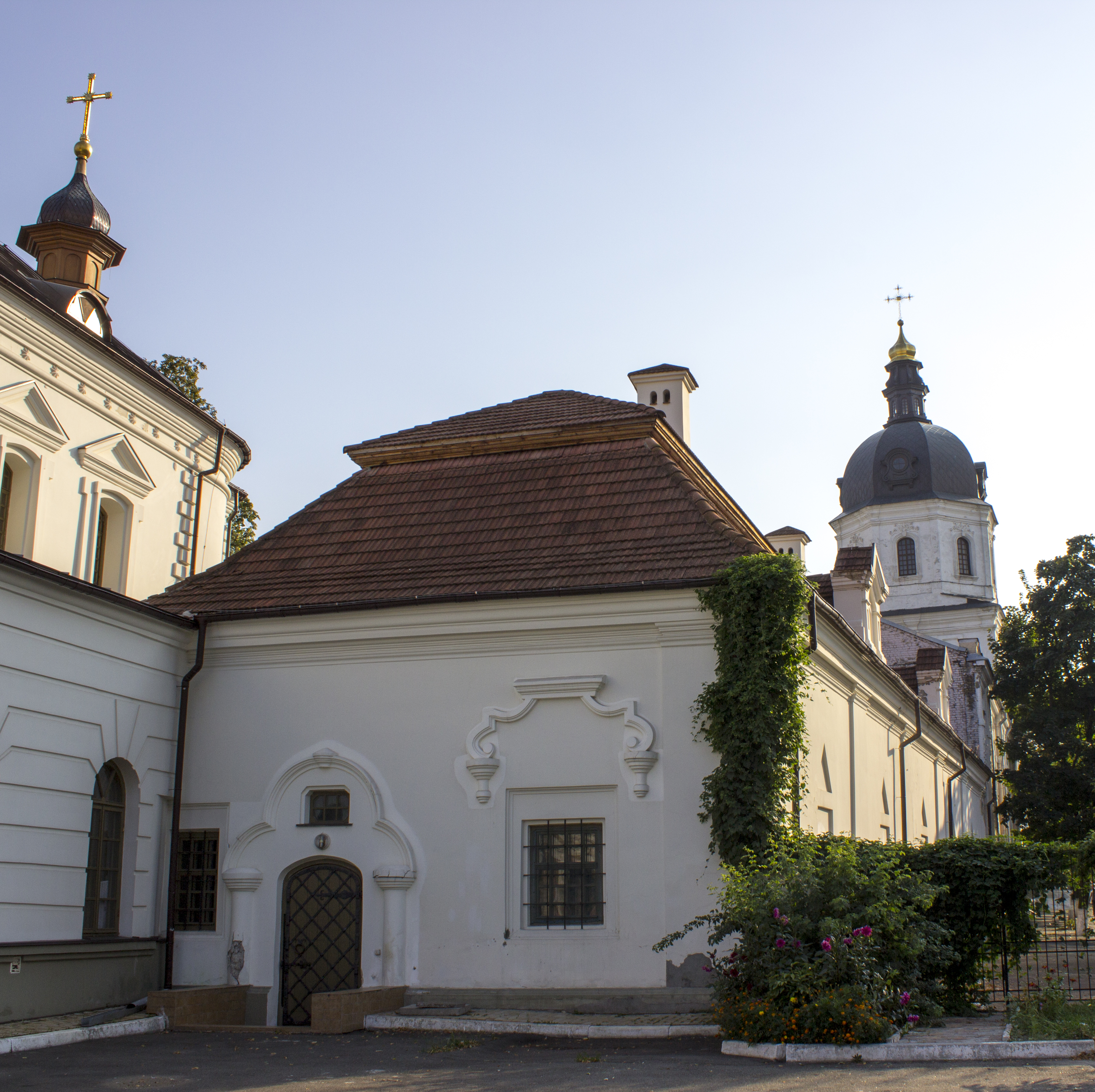
Reputed house of Halshka Hulevychivna in Kyiv

== Halshka's house in Kyiv ==
According to researcher Zoya Khyzhnyak, the school financed by Halshka Hulevychivna could have been located directly in the house that belonged to her. Researchers Yurii Losytskyy and Larysa Tolochko localize Halshka Hulevychivna's "Kamyanytsia" (stone house) on the site of the Annunciation Church and the kitchen of the Brotherhood Monastery, which, with subsequent restructuring, have survived to this day in Podil on the territory of the National University "Kyiv-Mohyla Academy" at 2, Hryhoriy Skovoroda Street. According to researchers, the house is a typical example of Ukrainian architecture of the 16th century — a house "in two halves". The building is built of brick, plastered, with a vaulted basement, rectangular in shape. However, the archaeological study of the "kitchen" did not reveal building materials older than late 17th - early 17th century, and its foundation and walls were made of the same red brick.

== Canonization ==
On November 22, 2021, Halshka Hulevychivna was canonized as a saint after the Holy Synod of the Orthodox Church of Ukraine granted a blessing for the local veneration of Halshka in the dioceses on the territory of historical Volyn and in Kyiv. On February 3, 2022, the Orthodox Church of Ukraine made Halshka Hulevychivna canonized as Saint Righteous Yelyzaveta Hulevych. The day of celebration is set on September 18 (September 5, according to the old style)[28].
