= St. Nicholas Military Cathedral =

Church in Kyiv

Coordinates: 50°26′30″N 30°33′05″E

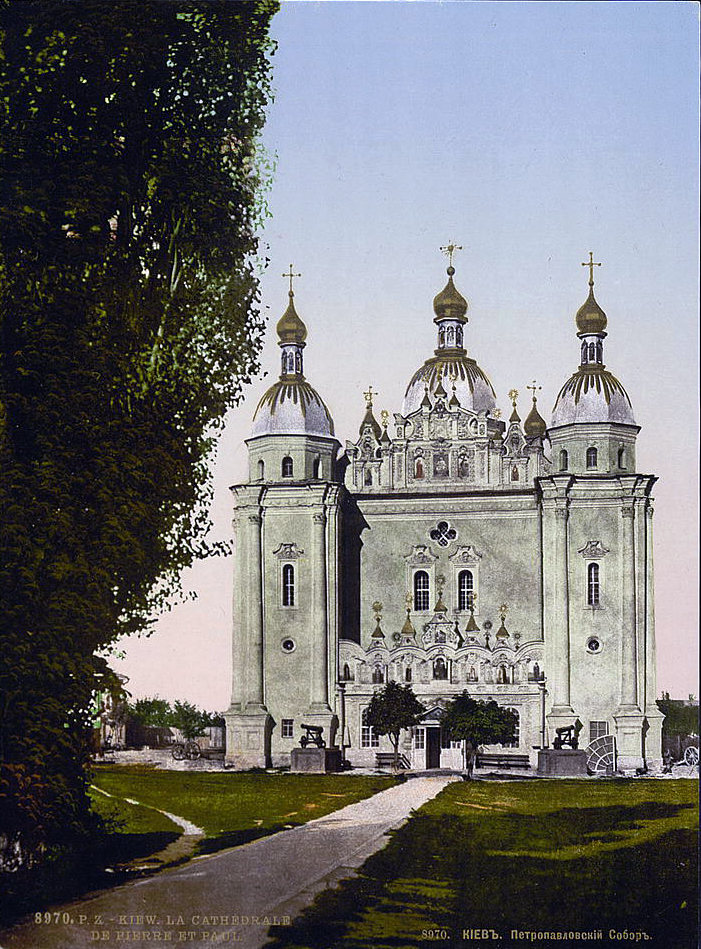
A postcard, ca. 1900.

The St. Nicholas Military Cathedral (Ukrainian: Військовий Микільський собор, romanized: Viiskovyi Mykilskyi sobor, Russian: Никольский военный собор), popularly known as The Great Nicholas (Ukrainian: Великий Микола, romanized: Velykyi Mykola) was one of the military cathedrals of the former Russian Empire. It was built in 1696 and located in the Kyiv Fortress overlooking the Dnieper River.

As a cathedral it was adopted after establishing the Russian Kyiv Fortress in the 19th century. This pentacupolar Ukrainian Baroque building was originally designed by Osip Startsev at the bidding of Hetman Ivan Mazepa to serve as the main church of St. Nicholas's Hermitage traditionally associated with Askold's Grave. The church was consecrated in 1696. It was famed for its dazzling gilded icon screen commissioned by Mazepa. A free-standing Rastrelliesque bell tower was completed in the mid-18th century.

The Russian Imperial Army became the church's patron in 1831. A set of cannons near the building proclaimed its military associations. In 1934, the Soviet regime blew up the cathedral, replacing it with a Pioneers Palace.

Struggle for a reconstruction of the cathedral is growing. The President of Ukraine Viktor Yushchenko supported the idea of restoration of the destroyed cultural heritage.

Now Divine services are carried out at open-air near to a place where there used to be a church. The website of parishioners.

In the 2010s, the question arose of the possible restoration of the shrine. In June 2009, Ukrainian President Viktor Yushchenko instructed the Cabinet of Ministers, together with the Kyiv City State Administration, to work out and submit proposals for the restoration of the lost historical and architectural monument, the complex of St. Nicholas Military Cathedral, which had and will have a unique historical and cultural value, within two months.

== Links ==
- Media related to St. Nicholas Military Cathedral, Kyiv at Wikimedia Commons
