= Gothard Wilhelm Butler =

Polish-Lithuanian noble (c. 1600–1660)

Gothard Wilhelm Butler (German: Gotthard Wilhelm von Buttlar, c. 1600 – 18 January 1660) was a Polish-Lithuanian nobleman and politician of Scottish origin, born in Kuldīga (Goldingen). He was Grand treasurer of the Crown, the Crown court chamberlain and a captain of the guard of King John II Casimir Vasa and erderman of Prienai, Parnu and Bolesław.

He started serving as a court writer. Shortly afterwards, then became a courtier of Prince John Casimir. He was associated with him until his death. He accompanied the future king, also in the expedition to Spain in 1638 and was imprisoned with him by Cardinal Richelieu in France. Through the exchange of letters that personally transported to Louis XIV and the Polish court, the king was soon freed. He was the first member of his family to convert from Protestantism to Catholicism. One of the richest in the Commonwealth, he started building the castle in Prienai.
