= Krutitsy =

Ecclesiastical estate in Moscow, Russia

Coordinates: 55°43′39″N 37°39′30″E

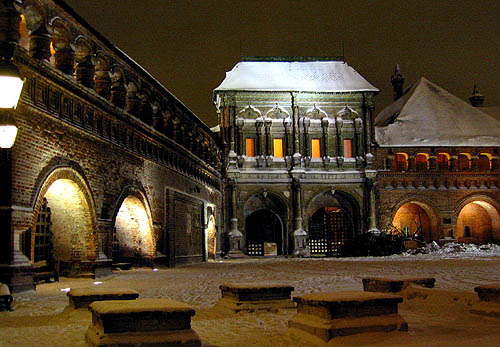
Krutitsy by night

Krutitsy Metochion (Russian: Крутицкое подворье), officially the Krutitsy Patriarchal Metochion (Russian: Крутицкое Патриаршее подворье), is an operating ecclesiastical estate of Russian Orthodox Church, located in Tagansky District of Moscow, Russia, 3 kilometers south-east from the Kremlin. The name Krutitsy (pl.), i.e. steep river banks, originally meant the hills immediately east from Yauza River. Krutitsy Metochion, established in the late 13th century, contains listed historical buildings erected in the late 17th century on the site of earlier 16th century foundations. After a brief period of prosperity in the 17th century, Krutitsy was shut down by imperial authorities in the 1780s, and served as a military warehouse for nearly two centuries. It was restored by Petr Baranovsky and gradually opened to the public after World War II; from 1991 to 1996, Krutitsy was returned to the Church and re-established as the personal metochion of Patriarch of Moscow and all Russia.

== Memorial buildings ==
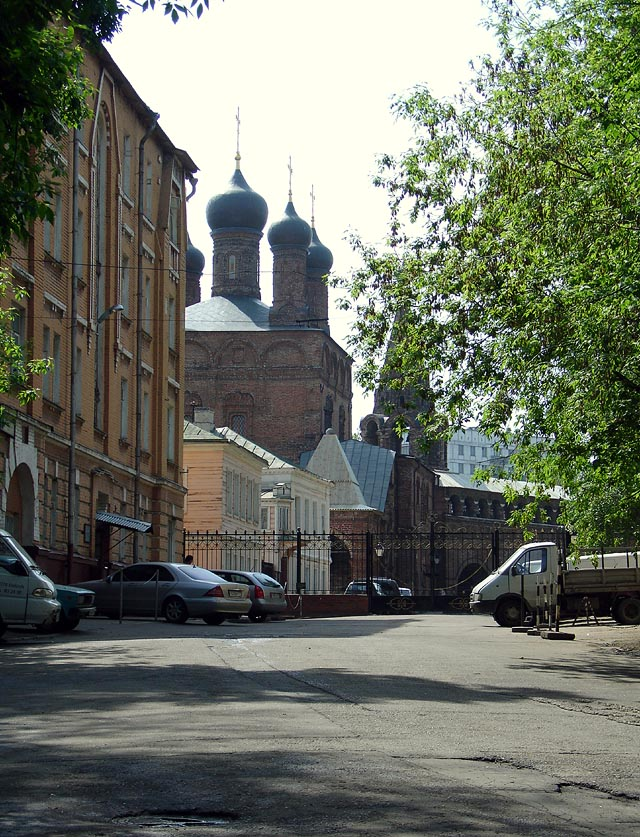
Entrance and Dormition Cathedral.

- Dormition Cathedral, actually containing two churches. The lower winter church of St. Peter and Paul was completed in 1667-1689. The upper, unheated summer church of Dormition of our Lady, was completed in 1700. The five-domed cathedral is 29 meters from ground level to the base of a cross. It used to be called Little Dormition Cathedral, as if second only to the Dormition Cathedral in Kremlin
- Resurrection Church, completed in the 1650s on early 16th century foundations
- Metropolitan's Chamber, 1655-1670
- Metropolitan's Gallery, connecting the Chambers to Cathedral, with gates and the Teremok tower above them, 1693-1694, by architects Osip Startsev and Illarion Kovalyov, with artwork tiles by Stepan Ivanov
- Riverside Dormitory, 1719 (restoration in progress)
- and a row of small 19th century wooden houses

== History ==
=== Foundation to prosperity ===
After the Mongol invasion of Russia, in 1261, Russian Orthodox clergy established the Diocese of Sarai in the capital city of the Golden Horde, with an overt mission to serve the numerous Slavic population of Sarai (some Slavs were abducted by force, some joined the Mongol service voluntarily; Russian princes had to pay regular visits of homage to Sarai). Some Orthodox priests, both Greek and Russian, entertained an idea of converting the Mongols to Christianity and thus acquire political influence for the Muscovites. The Mongols were quite tolerant to Christian churches, and it is speculated that Genghis Khan's mother was a Nestorian. The new diocese was styled as Diocese of Sarai and Don

Prince Daniel of Moscow, appreciating the benefits of this alliance, donated to the diocese lands on Moscow River banks, strategically placed on the direct river route to Sarai, near the land road to Kolomna and Ryazan. In 1272, Diocese completed the first church on a new site. In the fifteenth century the Golden Horde disintegrated into several warring principalities, its Orthodox population dispersed, thus in 1454 the Diocese relocated to Moscow. Bishop Vassian lost his see, but acquired a new title - Bishop of Krutitsy, and retained the old one. In 1492 the new Diocese acquired its own territories in lower Volga and Don areas; its bishops gained political influence and in 1589 acquired the style of Metropolitans of Krutitsy, Bishops of Sarai and Don.

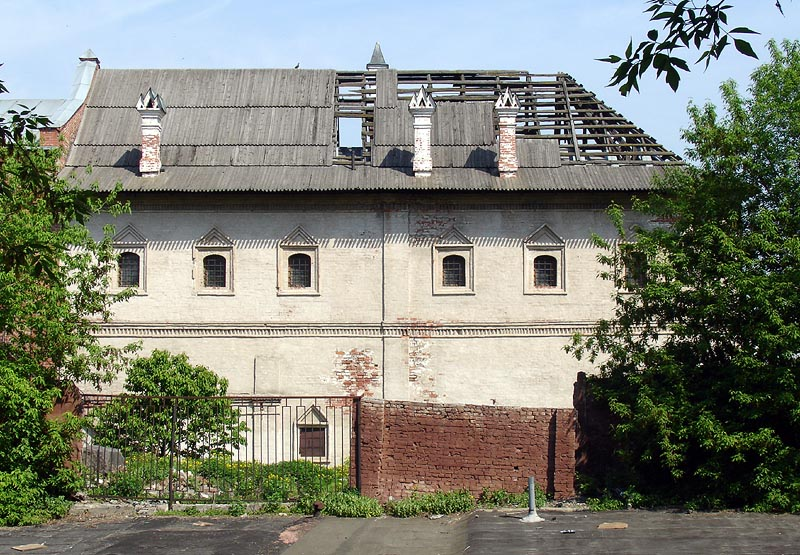
A 17th-century dormitory by the riverside.

During the Time of Troubles, when Kremlin Cathedrals were taken over by pretenders, Dormition Cathedral of Krutitsy was, temporarily, the main cathedral of Muscovy; despite later plundering by the Poles, loyalty to the winning party guaranteed further prosperity and influence in spiritual matters and politics. In the 1650s, Krutitsy was a site of bitter disputes between Patriarch Nikon and Old Believers (and, subsequently, a jail for the latter). The golden age of Krutitsy coincided with the rule of Metropolitan Paul II in 1664-1676. Paul II launched an ambitious construction program, building a new Dormition Cathedral, Metropolitan's Chamber, and an exquisite garden with Moscow's first fountain. Further improvements, notably the Gallery and Teremok, were completed by his successors.

=== Demise ===
In 1711, when emperor Peter I abolished patriarchy and subordinated the Church to State, Metropolitans of Krutitsy were downgraded to bishops (with an exception of revered Metropolitan Ignat Smola in 1719-1722). Soon, Krutitsy was hit by the fire of 1737; old wooden roofs burnt down and were replaced with tin, damaged frescoes simply whitewashed. In 1744-1751 the struggling abbey operated a seminary, and eventually lost this privilege too. In 1764 the state abolished the redundant Diocese of Saray and Don; in 1785, it abolished Diocese of Krutitsy and shut down the abbey, its relics and archives moved to Chudov Monastery.

Vacant property passed to the Imperial Military; Krutitsy became a military base. Dormition Cathedral burnt down in the Fire of Moscow (1812) to such extent that Alexander Tormasov, military governor of Moscow, ordered to demolish the remains and build barracks or stables instead. The order was cancelled after intervention of the clergy, when demolition was already underway. In 1817 the cathedral finally acquired a new roof; upper church opened in 1823.

In 1833, Krutitsy found a new sponsor - Grand Duke Alexander, future Alexander II. With all his influence, restoration by Konstantin Thon and Yevgraph Tyurin lasted for more than thirty years, to 1868. The military, however, retained most of the lands and Riverside Dormitory, and encircled the old abbey with a ring of new warehouses and barracks (still existing and operational today). These barracks also doubled as jail, handling prisoners like Alexander Herzen.

After the Russian Revolution of 1917, Dormition Cathedral operated until 1924. Then, it was closed, looted, frescoes covered with oil paint. All land was again granted to the military. In 1936-1938, Resurrection church was rebuilt into barracks, the old cemetery levelled and converted to a football field. Diocese of Krutitsy was created again in 1920, then in 1947 merged with Diocese of Kolomna.

=== Restoration ===
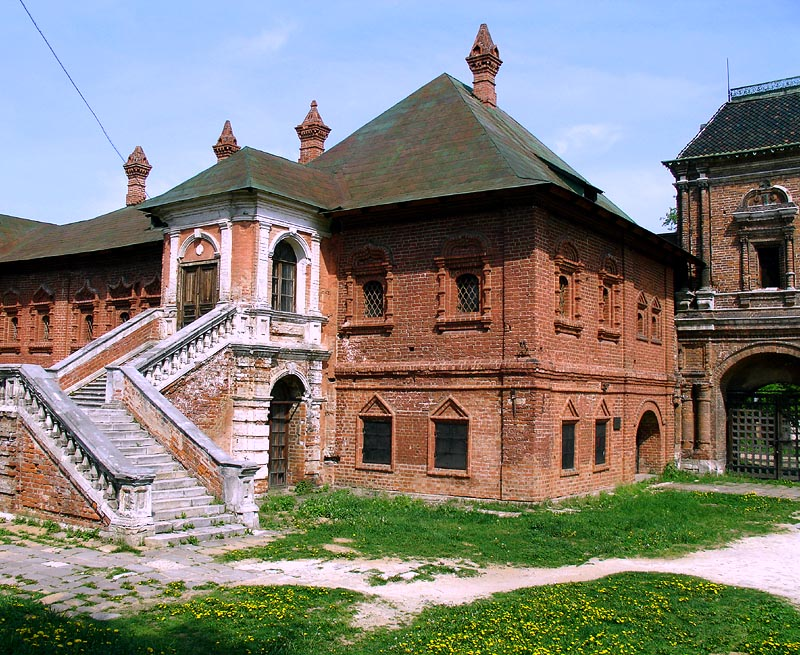
Metropolitan's Chamber was reduced by the Soviets to an ordinary apartment building without any architectural pretensions. The current appearance results from Baranovsky's restoration.

The same 1947, Petr Baranovsky, an outstanding Russian restorer, made Krutitsy the headquarters of his restoration workshop. Much work was undertaken to renovate the buildings in the 1960s, 1970s, and 1980s. Meanwhile, the property was still run by the military, which gradually vacated the buildings, starting with Dormition Cathedral in 1964.

Despite the 1947 decree on Krutitsy restoration, it was listed as a memorial building only in 1966, when the state launched massive redevelopment of adjacent low-rise neighborhoods. In 1982, Krutitsy became a branch of State Historical Museum (and still remains). Finally, in 1991 and 1996 the buildings of Krutitsy were returned to the church, and acquired their present title of Patriarch's Metochion. As of June, 2007, restoration is still under way in Resurrection Church and Riverside Dormitory.

The official site of the Krutitsy Metochion voices a version that in 1953 Lavrentiy Beria was jailed at Krutitsy. However, it this not corroborated by academic historians, and it is just as likely that Beria was murdered during his June 26 arrest and subsequent "detention" and "trial" was a coverup.

== Visitor access ==
Krutitsy Metochion is located within walking distance from Proletarskaya subway station and Novospassky Monastery, and has two gates for the public, accessible from Krutitskaya Street or the First Krutitsky Lane. It is not a monastery, looking more like a park managed by the clergy, however, certain rules are enforced:

- Visitors should leave at the end of evening mass
- Photography only with prior consent of the clergy
- No smoking anywhere within the gates
