= Brotherhood Monastery =

Coordinates: 50°27′56″N 30°31′14″E

Kyiv Brotherhood Monastery
- Києво-Братський монастир
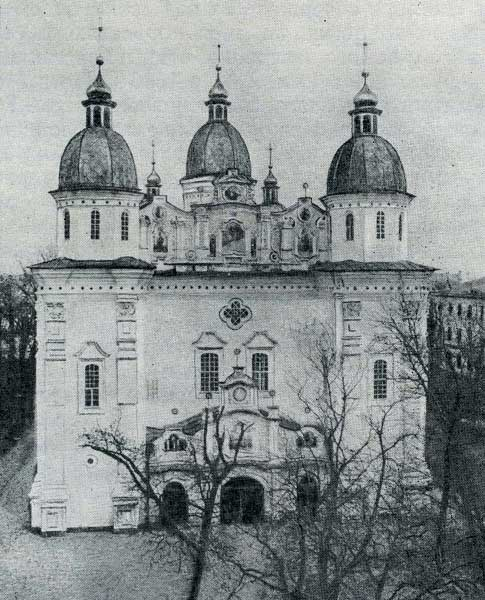
- Mazepa's Epiphany Cathedral (1690-1693)
- Interactive map of Kyiv Brotherhood Monastery

Monastery information
- Established: 1615
- Disestablished: 1935

Architecture
- Status: defunct
- Architect: Osip Startsev

Site
- Location: Kyiv
- Country: Ukraine

The Epiphany or Theophany Monastery (better known as Bratsky, or Brotherhood Monastery) is a former Orthodox monastery in Podil, Kyiv, Ukraine, in the vicinity of Kontraktova Square. Its history has been interwoven with that of Mohyla Academy which now occupies the remaining monastery buildings.

The monastery is supposed to have been founded by Patriarch Jeremias II of Constantinople (†1595). Patriarch Theophanes III of Jerusalem had it reorganized as a local brotherhood school, hence the name. Its benefactors included Petro Sahaidachny (whose tomb was on the grounds), Petro Mohyla (who raised its status to that of collegium), and Ivan Mazepa (who asked Osip Startsev to design the five-domed katholikon in a style known as Mazepa Baroque).

The founder was Patriarch Theophanes III of Jerusalem. The monastery acted as a patriarchal stavropegia according to a charter of May 26, 1620, written by him in Kyiv. Significant financial and material support was provided by Halshka Hulevychivna Lozchyna.

On April 7, 1640, the abbot of the monastery, Leontiy, wrote a "petition" to the Tsar of Muscovy to restore the Church of the Three Saints in Kyiv. King Władysław IV Vasa of Poland granted the monastery rights to the churches of Kyiv by a charter of June 7, 1640: Three Saints and the Church of the Exaltation of the Holy Cross.

The Universal of Hetman Bohdan Khmelnytsky of January 11, 1651, issued in Chyhyryn, transferred to the Kyiv Epiphany Monastery of the Brothers a part of the property of the Kyiv Dominican Monastery, in particular, the village of Mostyshcha over the Irpin River Kyiv Colonel Vasyl Dvoretsky on May 3, 1659, issued a charter to the Kyiv Brotherhood Monastery confirming the transfer of the lands of the former Dominican Monastery to it.

Mazepa's church, belfry, and most other buildings of the monastery were demolished by the Soviets in 1935. The remaining buildings have been either reduced to ruins or rebuilt with significant alterations (as was a refectory church, dating from the 17th century).
