= Osip Startsev =

Russian architect

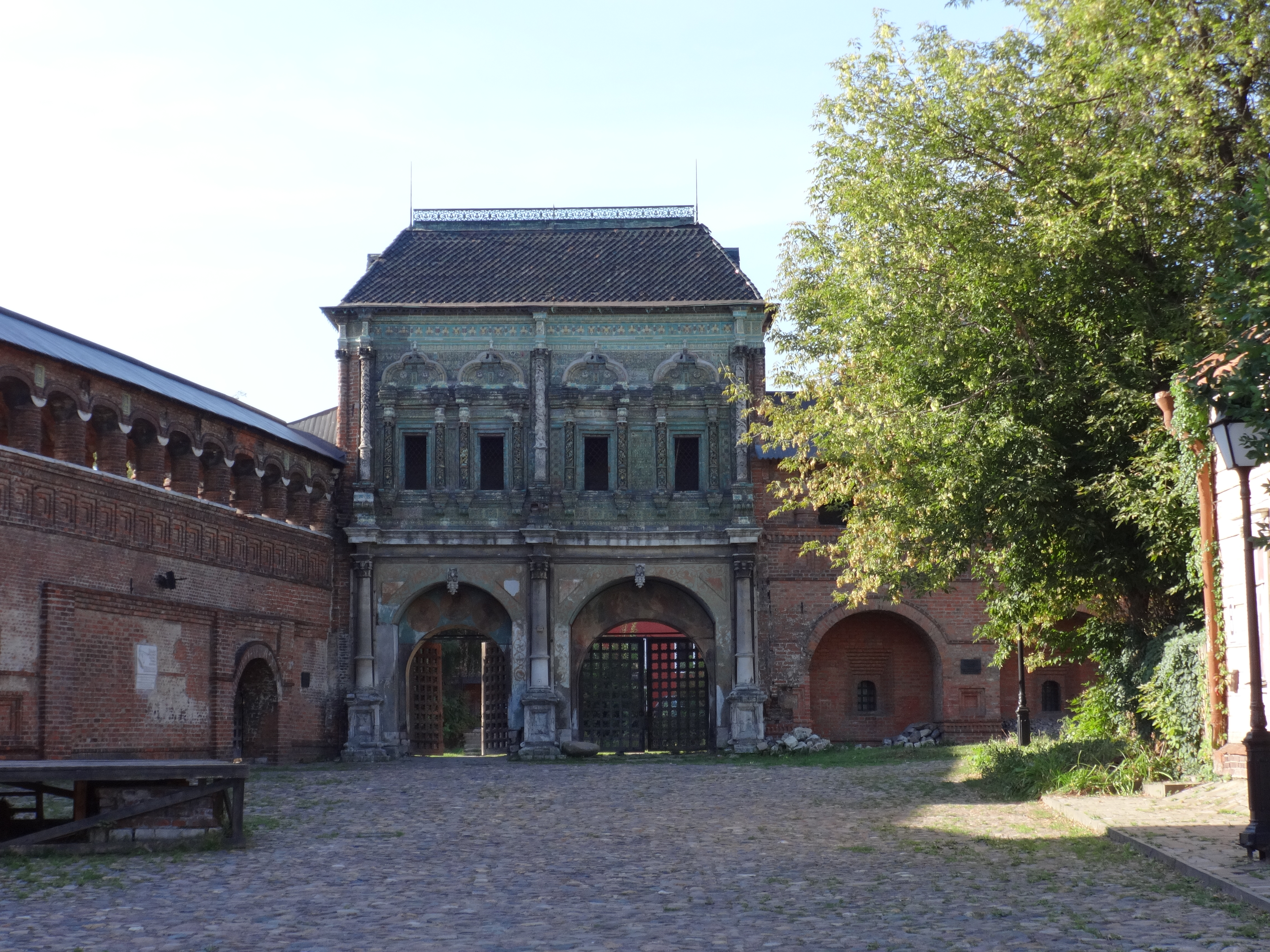
The Holy Gates (Teremok) at Krutitsy

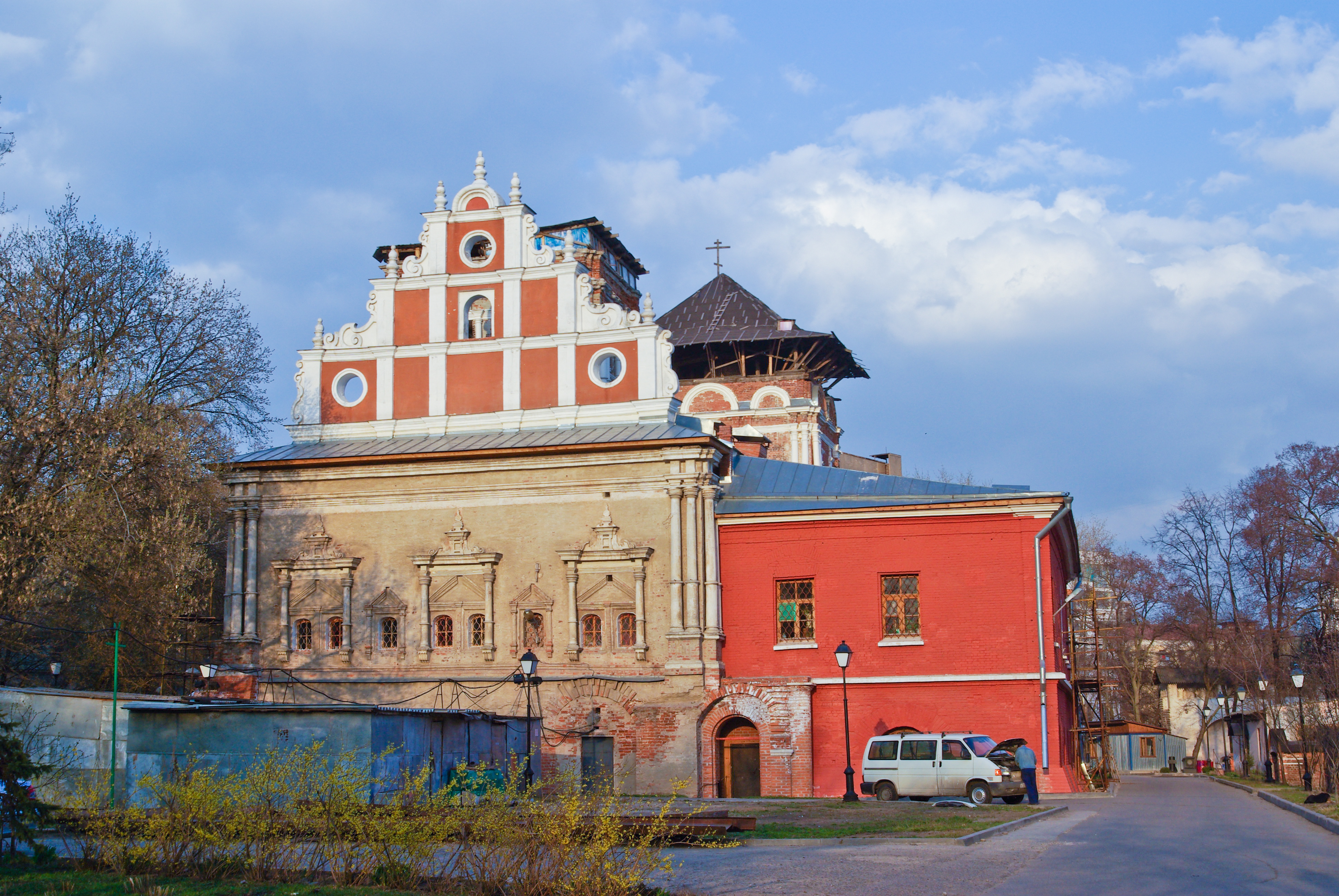
The refectory of the Simonov Monastery

Osip Dmitrievich Startsev (Осип Дмитриевич Старцев), (born in the 17th century and died in Moscow not earlier than 1714), was one of the greatest Moscow architects of the last quarter of the 17th – first decade of the 18th century, a representative of the “ Moscow Baroque ”. He was a Russian architect who mastered both Muscovite Baroque and Ukrainian Baroque idioms during the early part of Peter the Great's reign. His father Dmitry Startsev was the architect responsible for the completion of the Arkhangelsk Gostiny Dvor in the 1680s.

As a young man, Osip took part in the rebuilding campaigns in the Moscow Kremlin and redesigned several prikazy offices. It was Startsev who gave the Palace of Facets its familiar wide windows and built the 11-domed roof and cornice over the Terem Palace churches. His major buildings include the civic buildings in Moscow (notably the Krutitsy Teremok and the Simonov Monastery refectory) and the archaic-looking Baroque cathedrals in Kiev (the katholikons of St. Nicholas and Epiphany Monasteries). In the early 18th century Peter the Great sent him to design the fortress towns of Azov and Taganrog. He was also active in the reconstruction of Smolensk.

In 1714, Tsar Peter demanded stones already quarried to be brought from all parts of Russia to St. Petersburg, forbidding any building with stone outside the new capital under pain of punishment. Startsev is supposed to have resented the decision and taken monastic vows. His last work was the backward-looking Bolvanovka Church in Taganka District of Moscow.
