= Mikołaj Stefan Pac =

Polish nobleman

- Bishop of Vilnius; Castellan of Vilnius
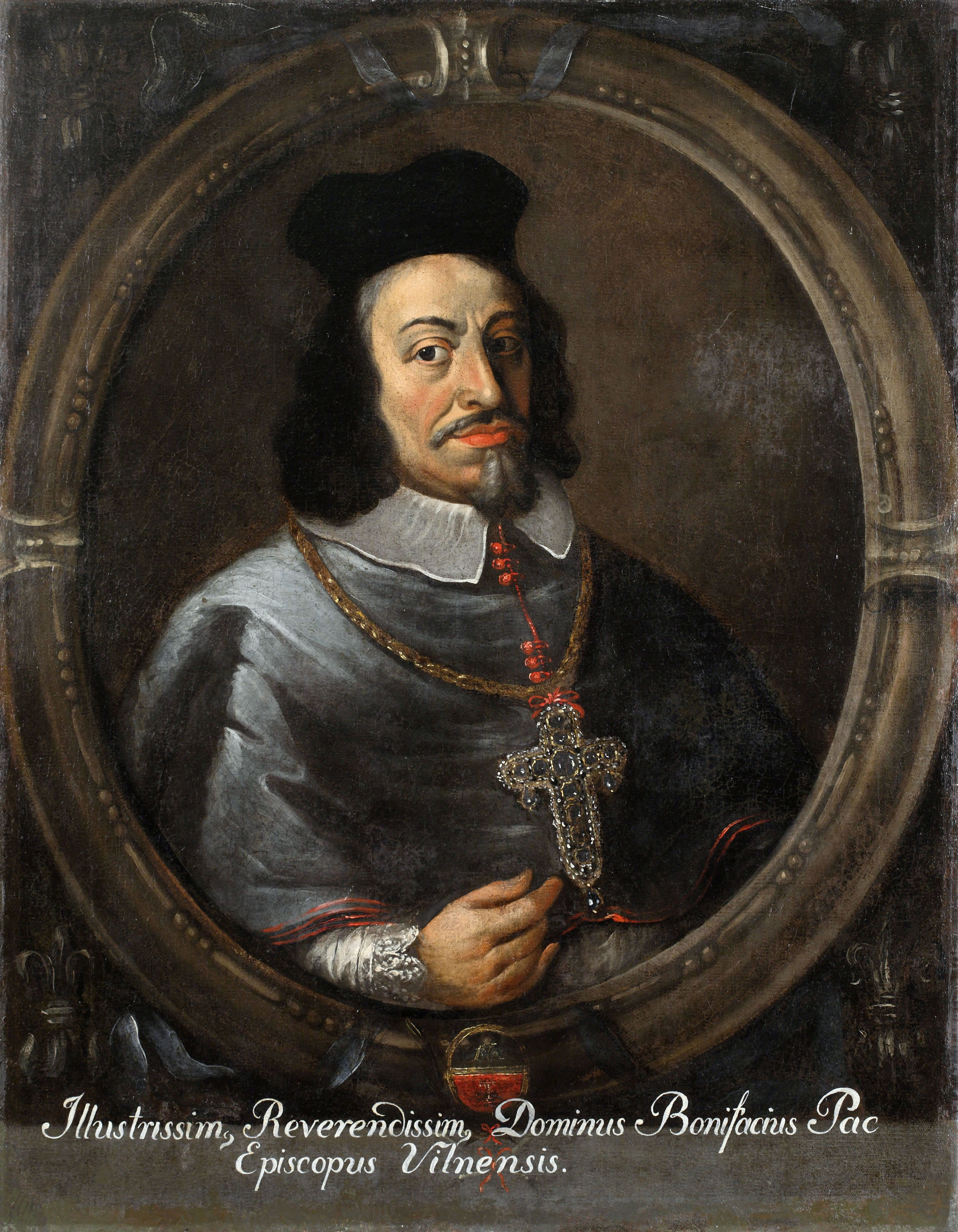
- Coat of arms: Gozdawa
- Born: c. 1626; Polish–Lithuanian Commonwealth
- Died: 8 May 1684; Rudnawa, near Grodno, Polish–Lithuanian Commonwealth
- Noble family: Pac
- Spouse: Teodora Tryznianka (divorced)
- Father: Stefan Pac
- Mother: Anna Marcybella née Rudomina-Dusiacka

Mikołaj Stefan Pac (Lithuanian: Mikalojus Steponas Pacas; c. 1626 – 1684) was a Polish–Lithuanian nobleman, Voivode of Trakai since 1651, Castellan of Vilnius since 1670, and the Bishop of Vilnius since 1671.

== Biography ==
=== Secular career ===
Mikołaj Stefan Pac was the youngest son of Stefan Pac and Anna Marcybella née Rudomina-Dusiacka. He studied in Vilnius and Ingolstadt. On 24 April 1651, he was appointed Voivode of Trakai. He participated in the fighting against the Cossacks, garrisoning the fortress at Krychaw and commanding a contingent of Lithuanian troops. He subsequently took part in the proceedings of the Treasury Tribunal.

During the Muscovite invasion, he defected to the side of Tsar Alexis in 1656. He later campaigned for George II Rákóczi to become the new Grand Duke of Lithuania. However, soon returned to the allegiance of John II Casimir Vasa. He became a supporter of royal policies, particularly the proposed election of a successor to the throne vivente rege. In 1662, however, he changed his position and did not attend the Sejm at which the royal proposals were definitively defeated.

Despite his family background, he developed increasingly close ties with the Radziwiłł family and supported their plans to elect Philip William of Neuburg as king. Following the election of Michael Korybut Wiśniowiecki, however, he drew closer to the royal court and distanced himself from the Radziwiłłs. He then decided to pursue an ecclesiastical career.

=== Ecclesiastical career ===
In September 1669, his wife formally released him from his marital vows by his wife (since c. 1650) Teodora née Tryzna, and on 1 July 1670 he received minor orders. Nevertheless, during this period he also assumed the office of castellan of Vilnius. In June 1671, the king nominated Pac as Bishop of Vilnius, and on 9 September the cathedral chapter elected him bishop, subject to papal approval. He travelled to Rome in late 1671 and again in September 1672, securing his appointment as administrator of the diocese in temporalibus and receiving ordination as a subdeacon, deacon and priest. The pope also appointed him referendary of both Signaturas, domestic prelate and protonotary apostolic.

On 11 August 1673, he was also appointed administrator in spiritualibus, but the cathedral chapter refused to recognize his authority because he had not received episcopal consecration. On 20 November 1677, the new pope, Innocent XI, established a commission to resolve the dispute between Pac and the Vilnius cathedral chapter. The Jesuit Andrzej Wyrwicz, who was appointed to act on behalf of the commission and served as the confessor of Pac's wife, persuaded her to formally renew her religious vows. This provided the grounds for a declaration that Pac was eligible to receive episcopal consecration. Nevertheless, the chapter continued its efforts to prevent his consecration. It was not until 1682 that Pac was finally consecrated as bishop by the papal nuncio, Opizio Pallavicini.

However, Pac died in Grodno on 8 May 1684, less than two years after his consecration. He was buried in St. Mary's Chapel in Vilnius Cathedral. He had no children with his wife. His principal heir was his nephew, Jerzy Wandalin Mniszech, Voivode of Volhynia. He bequeathed his estates at Czabiszki and a manor house on Długa Street in Warsaw to the Vilnius cathedral chapter.

== Bibliography ==
- Pacowie: materyjały historyczno-genealogiczne / ułożone i wydane przez Józefa Wolffa, 1885, s. 172-188
- A. Rachuba, Mikołaj Stefan Pac [w:] Polski Słownik Biograficzny, t. XXIV, 1979, s. 738-741.

Catholic Church titles
| Preceded by Aleksander Kazimierz Sapieha | Bishop of Vilnius; 1672–1684 | Succeeded by Aleksander Kotowicz |
