= Sēlpils =

Village in Sēlpils Parish, Sala Municipality, Latvia

Coordinates: 56°31′40″N 25°36′45″E

Sēlpils is a village in Sēlpils Parish, Jēkabpils Municipality in the Selonia region of Latvia, about 9 km from the historical Sēlpils hillfort, where the village of Vecsēlpils ("old Sēlpils") is located now.
