= Vecsēlpils =

Village in Latvia

Coordinates: 56°35′15″N 25°39′30″E

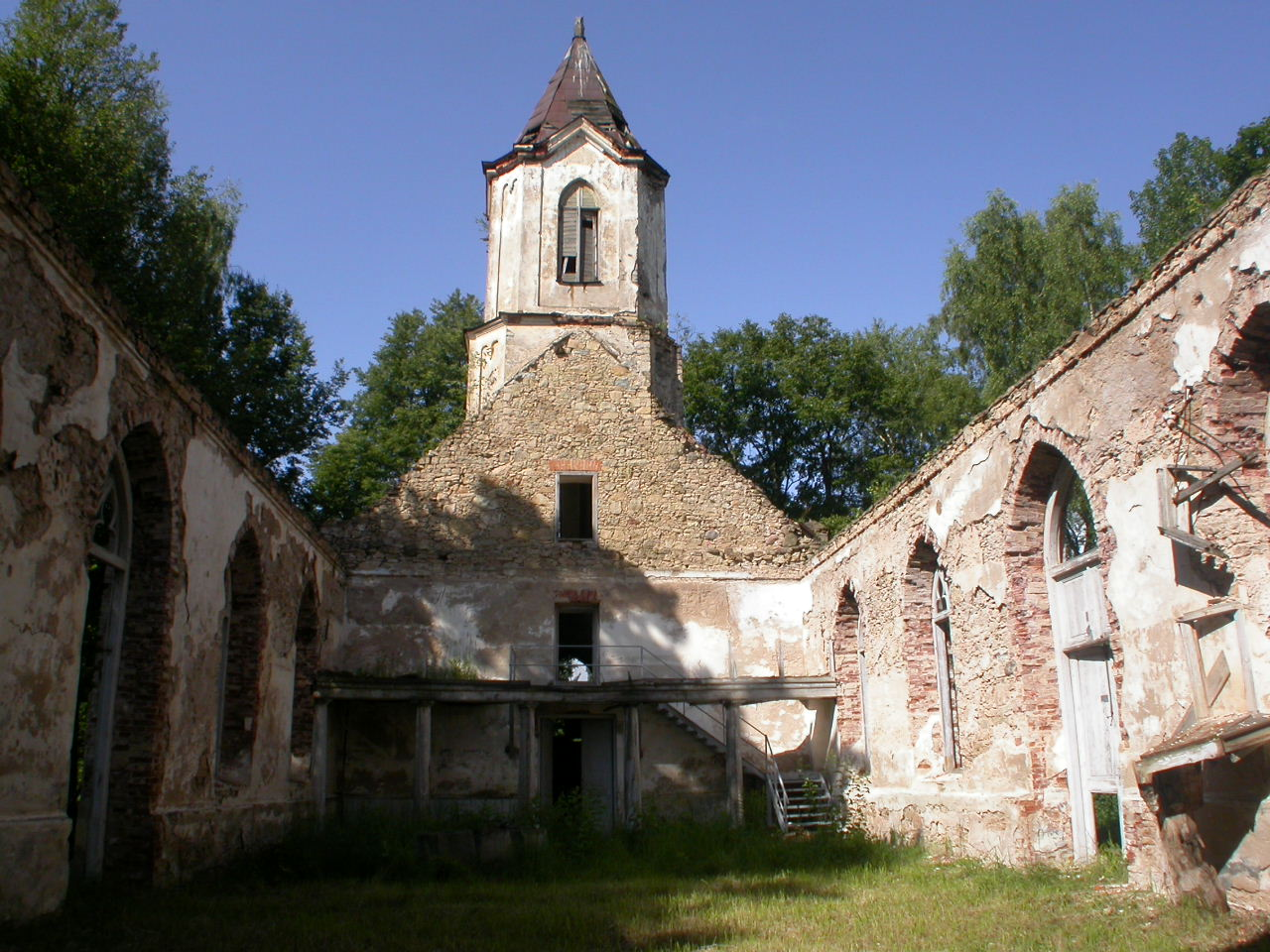
Ruins of Sēlpils Lutheran Church

Vecsēlpils ("old Sēlpils", formerly Sēlpils; German: Selburg) is a village in Sēlpils Parish, Jēkabpils Municipality in the Selonia region of Latvia, on the location of the ancient Selonian town of Sēlpils.

The ruins of the ancient Sēlpils Castle were on the left bank of Daugava near Vecsēlpils, but are now on an island since the construction of Pļaviņas Hydroelectric Power Station and reservoir.

== See also ==
- Jaunsēlpils ("new Sēlpils"), developed about 6 km south of the previous location around a railway station built at the beginning of the 20th century.
