= Sēlpils Castle =

Coordinates: 56°35′14″N 25°38′25″E

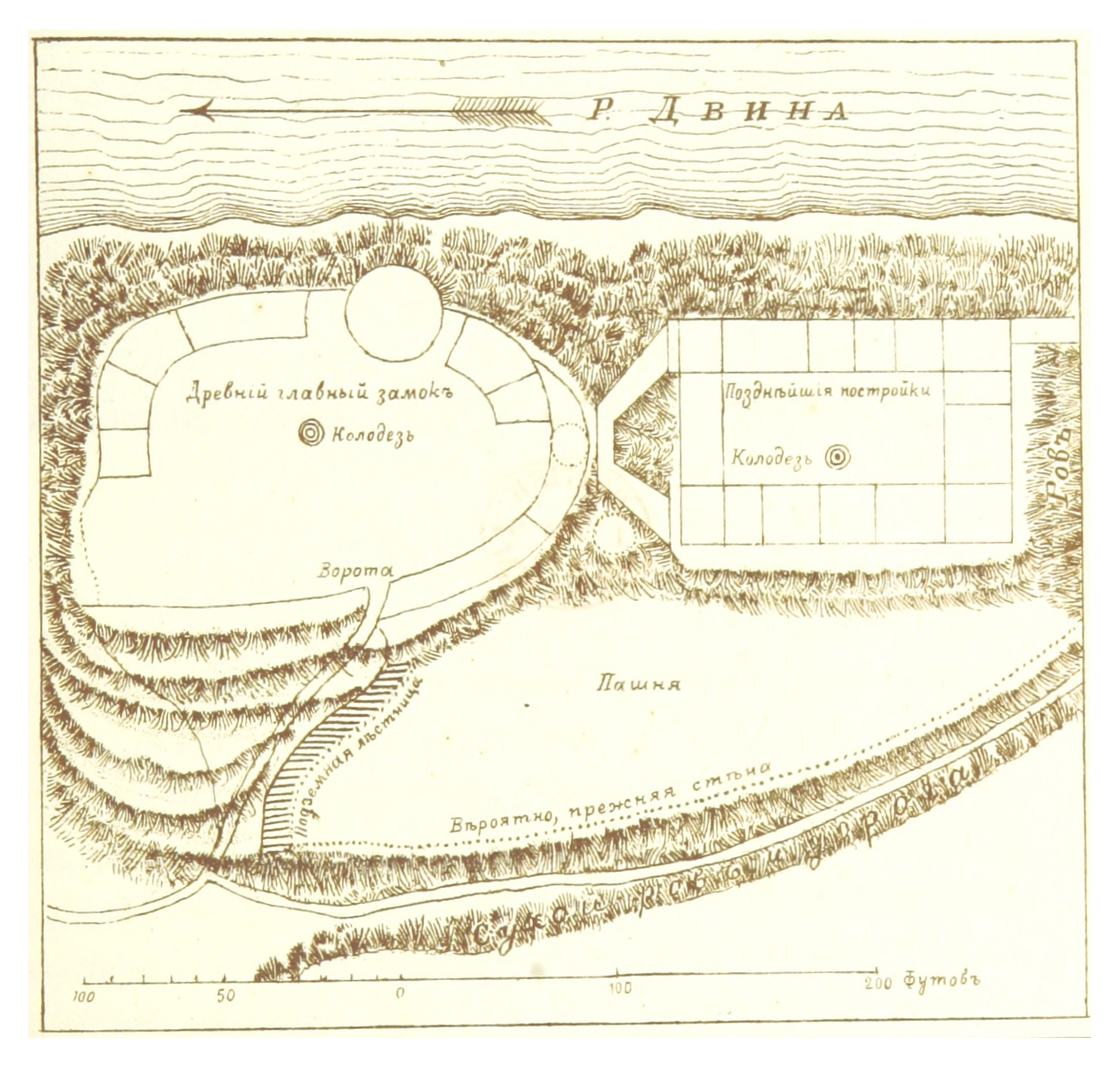
Plan of the ruins of Selburg castle (c1880)

Sēlpils Castle (Latvian: Sēlpils pils; Latin: Castrum Selonum) was an ancient castle in Sēlpils Parish, Jēkabpils Municipality in the Selonia region of Latvia.

== History ==
It was built in place of the ancient Sēlpils hillfort (Latvian: Sēlpils pilskalns), a military and political center of ancient Selonia, a land of the Balts. When the Livonian Order entered the land, they built a stone castle known as Selburg in German.

Today, the village of Vecsēlpils ("old Sēlpils") is located nearby. The ruins of the hillfort were on the left bank of Daugava near Vecsēlpils. After the construction of Pļaviņas Hydroelectric Power Station and reservoir, the ruins are on an island.

== Archeological findings ==
Archaeological evidence shows that Sēlpils, 17 km northwest of modern Jēkabpils, was a major settlement between the 10th and 13th centuries. Used as a base for raids by the Selonians and their Lithuanian allies into Latgalian and Livonian lands, Sēlpils was first mentioned in the Chronicle of Henry of Livonia, which describes its capture by the Livonian Order and their Christianized ethnic Livonian allies in 1208. Sēlpils was briefly the seat of a Selonian diocese (1218–1226), and then came under the rule of the Livonian Order, which constructed fortifications there for the Advocate (German: Vogt) of the Order. These were destroyed by the Swedes in 1704, during the Great Northern War, and only traces of the foundations are visible at the site today.

Since the early 17th century, the ancient city of Sēlpils also existed. The importance of Sēlpils as a trading center on the Daugava declined after the military devastation of the early 18th century.

== See also ==
- Battle of Selburg
