= Sēlpils Parish =

Administrative unit of Latvia

- parish of Latvia
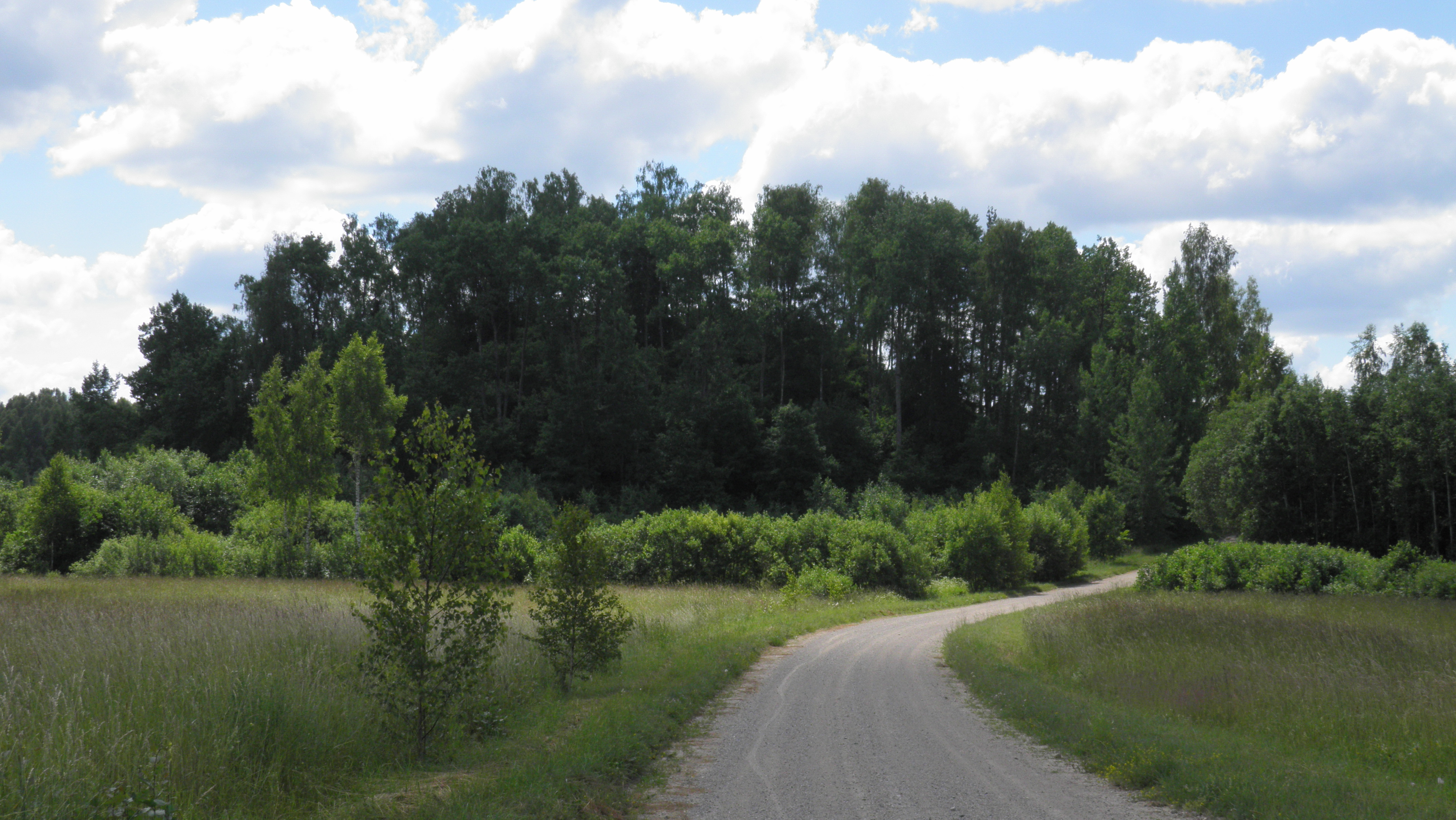

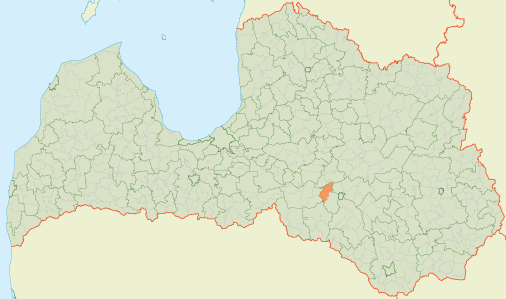
- 56°32′22″N 25°39′23″E
- Country: Latvia

Area
  - Total: 122.07 km^{2} (47.13 sq mi)
  - Land: 114.53 km^{2} (44.22 sq mi)
  - Water: 7.54 km^{2} (2.91 sq mi)

Population (1 January 2024)
  - Total: 631
  - Density: 5.2/km^{2} (13/sq mi)

Sēlpils Parish (Latvian: Sēlpils pagasts) is a large rural administrative unit within Jēkabpils Municipality in the Selonia region of south-eastern Latvia. Before the 2009 territorial reform, it belonged to the now-defunct Jēkabpils District. The parish seat is located in the village of Sēlija, while Sēlpils, the historically significant site on the Daugava river, gives the parish its name. According to the 2024 national register, Sēlpils Parish had a permanent population of 705 spread over 225 km^{2}, yielding a density of barely 3.1 inhabitants per km^{2}.

The parish occupies a plateau between the Daugava and Dienvidsusēja rivers, with rolling terrain shaped by glacial till, forest–field mosaics, and bog remnants, particularly the protected wetland Kalna zāļu purvs, included in Latvia's Natura 2000 network. Near the Daugava River, Sēlpils village preserves the earthworks of a major Livonian Order castle, sacked by Swedish troops in 1704 during the Great Northern War. Archaeological excavations led by Elvīra Šnore and Anna Zariņa (1963–1965) uncovered cultural layers ranging from Late Stone-Age flint points to a 10th–12th-century hillfort rampart directly beneath the crusader masonry, and subsequent surveys, synthesised in Juris Urtāns' 1993 monograph on Daugava hillforts, confirm an unbroken sequence from Iron-Age settlement to crusader stronghold.

Modern Sēlpils Parish supports low-intensity mixed agriculture, peat extraction, and small-scale timber processing. Ongoing rural-development initiatives, part-funded by the Latvian Rural Support Service, aim to preserve natural values while improving access to roads and water infrastructure across scattered villages such as Vecsēlpils, Plāteri and Puļpāni.

== Towns, villages and settlements of Sēlpils Parish ==
- Arbidāni
- Bisenieki
- Bitānkalns
- Buivāni
- Ezerciems
- Gretes
- Īlenāni
- Ķipu kalns
- Kleberkalns
- Līkumi
- Naudīdzāni
- Pāvuli
- Plāteri
- Plītes
- Priekšāni
- Puļpāni
- Riesti
- Sēlija
- Sēlpils
- Spietiņi
- Ūdrāni
- Vecsēlpils
- Zaķēni
