= Volhynian Voivodeship =

Volhynian Voivodeship or Wołyń Voivodeship may refer to:

- Volhynian Voivodeship (1569–1795)
- Wołyń Voivodeship (1793)
- Wołyń Voivodeship (1921–1939)
