= Stefan Pac =

Polish–Lithuanian nobleman, politician and magnate

- Grand Treasurer of Lithuania; Deputy Chancellor of Lithuania
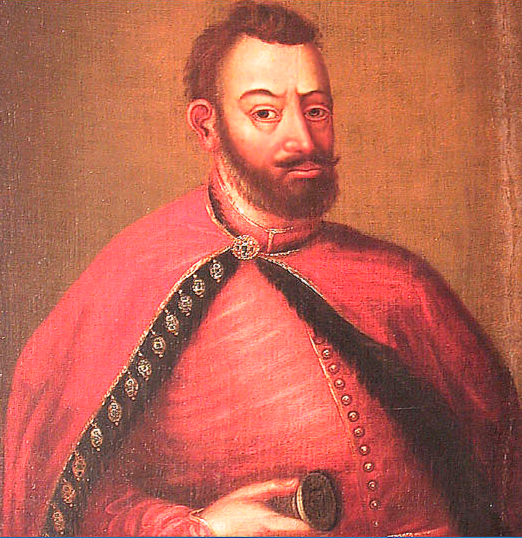
- Coat of arms: Gozdawa
- Born: 1587
- Died: 1640 (aged 52–53)
- Noble family: Pac
- Spouse: Anna from Dusetos
- Issue: Krzysztof Zygmunt Pac; Mikołaj Stefan Pac

Stefan Pac (Lithuanian: Steponas Pacas; c. 1587–17 November 1640) was a Polish–Lithuanian nobleman, politician and magnate.

He was the private secretary of King Sigismund III of Poland since 1611, Grand Clerk of Lithuania since 1615, Recorder of Lithuania since 1626, Court Treasurer of Lithuania since 1630, Grand Treasurer of Lithuania since 1630 and eventually the Deputy Chancellor of Lithuania since 1635.

Marshal of the Sejm (extraordinary) on 13–18 November 1629 in Warsaw.

== See also ==
- Lithuanian nobility
