= FIBA EuroBasket 2005 qualification =

Eurobasket 2005 Logo

Qualification for the 2005 FIBA European Championship, commonly called FIBA EuroBasket 2005 took place between 8 September and 25 September 2004. A total of eleven teams qualified for the tournament. Hosts Serbia and Montenegro plus the top four teams from EuroBasket 2003, Lithuania, Spain, Italy and Greece qualified directly. Greece took the place of the French team, which was the fourth-placed team in EuroBasket 2003.

== Format ==
For this edition of the FIBA EuroBasket tournament, a new qualification format was created. National squads were divided in a two-tier system. Teams in Division A competed for direct qualification to FIBA EuroBasket 2005, while teams in Division B competed for two spots on the next tournament's Division A. Those two spots would correspond to the two teams from Division A that were relegated.

Division A

- Teams were split into four groups of four teams each, and one group of three teams. The competition system was that of a double round-robin with home and away games where the top two teams from each group qualified to EuroBasket 2005.
- The remaining teams where split into three double round-robin groups of three teams and competed in an additional qualifying round. The best three teams from each group formed an additional round-robin group where the best team earned the last berth for EuroBasket 2005. The three bottom teams from the additional qualifying round competed in another round-robin group where the bottom-two teams were relegated to Division B for the following tournament.

Division B

- Teams were split into three groups of four teams each, and one group of three teams. The competition system was that of a double round-robin with home and away games where the top teams from each group where paired in two series of home-and-away games. The winner of each series (by overall point differential if the two-game series is a split) is promoted to Division A for the next tournament.

== Division A ==
=== Qualifying round ===
Qualified for FIBA EuroBasket 2005

==== Group 1 ====
Team	Pld	W	L	PF	PA	PD	Pts	Tie
Croatia	4	3	1	312	268	+44	7	1–1 +13
Russia	4	3	1	327	296	+31	7	1–1 -13
Sweden	4	0	4	275	350	−75	4	

Rules=1) Points; 2) Head-to-head results; 3) Points difference; 4) Points scored.

8 Sep 2004
17:45

Boxscore

Croatia	86–63	Russia
Scoring by quarter: 24–17, 21–20, 18–11, 23–15
Pts: Zizic 20; Rebs: Vujcic 10; Asts: Vujcic 3		Pts: Karasev 16; Rebs: Panov 8 Asts: E. Pashutin 2

Zadar
Attendance: 2,500
Referees: Grzegorz Ziemblicki (POL), Ademir Zurapovic (BIH), Peter Bodnar (HUN)

11 Sep 2004
19:00

Boxscore

Russia	97–64	Sweden
Scoring by quarter: 21–12, 29–14, 30–17, 17–21
Pts: Kirilenko 24; Rebs: Likholitov 9 Asts: Karasev, Domani 6		Pts: Jönzén 15; Rebs: Pettersson Rosendahl 9 Asts: Levin 4

CSKA Sport Hall, Moscow
Attendance: 3,000
Referees: Memduh Öget (TUR), Ilkka Weijo (FIN), Juris Kokainis (LAT)

15 Sep 2004
19:00

Boxscore

Sweden	69–86	Croatia
Scoring by quarter: 20–21, 21–20, 9–23, 19–22
Pts: Jönzén 16; Rebs: Nnamaka, Jönzén 7 Asts: L. Larsson 6		Pts: Popovic 17; Rebs: Vujcic 14; Asts: Popovic 6

Stockholm
Attendance: 2,043
Referees: Ivo Dolinek (CZE), Jaroslav Janac (SVK), Olegs Latisevs (LAT)

18 Sep 2004
19:00

Boxscore

Russia	75–65	Croatia
Scoring by quarter: 22–14, 22–18, 14–12, 17–21
Pts: Kirilenko 14; Rebs: Mikhailov 10; Asts: Karasev 5		Pts: Popovic 16; Rebs: Zizic 6 Asts: Ukic 5

Arena of Ural Great, Perm
Attendance: 7,500
Referees: Serge De Coster (BEL), Volodymyr Drabikovskyi (UKR), Aare Halliko (EST)

22 Sep 2004
19:00

Boxscore

Sweden	81–92	Russia
Scoring by quarter: 15–28, 24–22, 19–16, 23–26
Pts: L. Larsson 17; Rebs: Nnamaka 11; Asts: L. Larsson, Ringström, Pettersson Rosendahl 3		Pts: Petrenko 21; Rebs: Panov 11; Asts: Karasev 7

Uppsala
Attendance: 1,342
Referees: Agnis Perkons (LAT), Grzegorz Ziemblicki (POL), Mikko Toivonen (FIN)

25 Sep 2004
16:30

Boxscore

Croatia	75–61	Sweden
Scoring by quarter: 20–20, 15–13, 20–15, 20–13
Pts: Vujcic 19; Rebs: Vujcic 10; Asts: Vujcic 4		Pts: Myrthil 12; Rebs: Jönzén 7 Asts: L. Larsson 5

Šibenik
Attendance: 1,000
Referees: Luigi Lamonica (ITA), Christoph Holzner (AUT), Damir Kunisic (BIH)

==== Group 2 ====
Team	Pld	W	L	PF	PA	PD	Pts	Tie
Latvia	6	4	2	517	451	+66	10	1–1, +12
Bulgaria	6	4	2	487	495	−8	10	1–1, -12
Israel	6	3	3	471	467	+4	9	
Portugal	6	1	5	473	535	−62	7	

Rules=1) Points; 2) Head-to-head results; 3) Points difference; 4) Points scored.

8 Sep 2004
18:00

Boxscore

Latvia	80–57	Israel
Scoring by quarter: 25–11, 12–14, 25–17, 18–15
Pts: Skirmants 12; Rebs: Helmanis 9 Asts: Stelmahers 5		Pts: Green 14; Rebs: Tamir, Green 10; Asts: Halperin 4

Arena of LBT, Ventspils
Attendance: 1,850
Referees: Vladimir Okhrimenko (RUS), Nikolaos Mpotitsis (SWE), Aare Halliko (EST)

8 Sep 2004
20:30

Boxscore

Bulgaria	89–87	Portugal
Scoring by quarter: 21–26, 21–15, 28–25, 19–21
Pts: Stoykov 25; Rebs: Banev 10; Asts: Videnov, Angelov, H. Dimitrov, Stoykov 2		Pts: Coragem Jordão, Gouveia Simão 19; Rebs: Coragem Jordão 9 Asts: J. Costa 5

Palace of Culture and Sports, Varna
Attendance: 4,000
Referees: Nikolaos Zavlanos (GRE), Branislav Mrdak (SRB), Emin Mogulkoc (TUR)

11 Sep 2004
17:00

Boxscore

Portugal	76–81	Latvia
Scoring by quarter: 16–20, 16–16, 16–23, 28–22
Pts: Gouveia Simão 16; Rebs: Cunha 8 Asts: J. Costa 7		Pts: Stelmahers 25; Rebs: Helmanis, Skirmants 5 Asts: Stelmahers 6

São João da Madeira
Attendance: 1,500
Referees: Raul Chaves (ARG), Eric Bertrand (SUI), Anibal Castano (FRA)

11 Sep 2004
20:00

Boxscore

Israel	84–64	Bulgaria
Scoring by quarter: 14–19, 24–20, 26–9, 20–16
Pts: Shason 19; Rebs: Green 12; Asts: Lubin, Tapiro 4		Pts: Angelov 13; Rebs: Angelov 8 Asts: Angelov 3

Metrowest Sport Palace, Ra'anana
Attendance: 1,000
Referees: Mehmet Keseratar (TUR), Christos Mastraftsis (GRE), Christakis Papadamou (CYP)

14 Sep 2004
20:45

Boxscore

Israel	96–101 (OT)	Portugal
Scoring by quarter: 25–22, 25–20, 17–29, 20–16, Overtime: 9–14
Pts: Lubin 22; Rebs: Green 8 Asts: Tapiro 7		Pts: Gouveia Simão 25; Rebs: Coragem Jordão 9 Asts: J. Costa 5

Metrowest Sport Palace, Ra'anana
Attendance: 2,000
Referees: Chrysanthos Christodoulou (CYP), Lazaros Voreadis (GRE), Fatih Söylemezoglu (TUR)

15 Sep 2004
17:30

Boxscore

Bulgaria	96–85	Latvia
Scoring by quarter: 25–27, 16–16, 29–16, 26–26
Pts: Bozov 22; Rebs: Georgiev 11; Asts: Stoykov 6		Pts: Skele 20; Rebs: Skele 9 Asts: Skele 4

Arena of BC CSKA, Sofia
Attendance: 2,000
Referees: Konstantinos Koromilas (GRE), Marian Oprea (ROU), Marjan Stojovski(MKD)

18 Sep 2004
17:00

Boxscore

Portugal	72–87	Bulgaria
Scoring by quarter: 23–16, 22–30, 14–16, 13–25
Pts: Coragem Jordão 16; Rebs: Coragem Jordão 8 Asts: J. Costa 11		Pts: Stoykov 24; Rebs: Stoykov 6 Asts: H. Dimitrov 9

Santiago do Cacém
Attendance: 1,150
Referees: Antonio Gallo (ESP), Marcel Cimpan (ENG), Joel Danielou (FRA)

18 Sep 2004
20:00

Boxscore

Israel	79–77	Latvia
Scoring by quarter: 9–22, 20–14, 26–18, 24–23
Pts: Tapiro 24; Rebs: Tapiro 6 Asts: Tapiro 4		Pts: Stelmahers 22; Rebs: Grafs 7 Asts: Buskevics 4

Metrowest Sport Palace, Ra'anana
Attendance: 2,000
Referees: Memduh Öget (TUR), Nikolaos Zavlanos (GRE), Grzegorz Bachanski (POL)

22 Sep 2004
17:30

Boxscore

Bulgaria	72–65	Israel
Scoring by quarter: 19–19, 16–14, 22–16, 15–16
Pts: Stoykov 21; Rebs: Stoykov 11; Asts: Stoykov 5		Pts: Tapiro 19; Rebs: Green 9 Asts: Tapiro 8

Palace of Culture and Sports, Varna
Attendance: 4,000
Referees: Doru Vinasi (ROU), Branislav Mrdak (SRB), Christos Christodoulou (GRE)

22 Sep 2004
19:00

Boxscore

Latvia	92–64	Portugal
Scoring by quarter: 23–18, 24–12, 22–13, 23–21
Pts: Vitols 14; Rebs: Grafs 9 Asts: Skele, Stelmahers 4		Pts: Santos 18; Rebs: Coragem Jordão 7 Asts: Reis Veiga Perdigão 4

Arena of LBT, Ventspils
Attendance: 1,700
Referees: Aliaksandr Yarotski (BLR), Vladimir Okhrimenko (RUS), Peter Bodnar (HUN)

25 Sep 2004
19:00

Boxscore

Latvia	102–79	Bulgaria
Scoring by quarter: 17–21, 27–10, 19–30, 39–18
Pts: Helmanis 22; Rebs: Skirmants 9 Asts: Buskevics 11		Pts: Videnov 22; Rebs: Angelov 9 Asts: Bozov, Angelov, Stoykov 3

Arena of LBT, Ventspils
Attendance: 2,600
Referees: Henrykh Bekish (BLR), Nikolaos Mpotitsis (SWE), Aare Halliko (EST)

25 Sep 2004
21:00

Boxscore

Portugal	73–90	Israel
Scoring by quarter: 16–29, 10–20, 27–24, 20–17
Pts: Coragem Jordão 22; Rebs: Santos 8 Asts: Dias da Silva, Coragem Jordão, Reis Veiga Perdigão, Santos 3		Pts: Burstein 23; Rebs: Kozikaro, Green 8 Asts: Tapiro 7

Municipal Hall Tondela, Tondela
Referees: Raul Chaves (ARG), Richard Stokes (ENG), Guerrino Cerebuch (ITA)

==== Group 3 ====
Team	Pld	W	L	PF	PA	PD	Pts
Germany	6	6	0	501	405	+96	12
Ukraine	6	3	3	448	495	−47	9
Hungary	6	2	4	495	475	+20	8
Belgium	6	1	5	463	532	−69	7

8 Sep 2004
17:00

Boxscore

Hungary	96–70	Belgium
Scoring by quarter: 27–20, 18–15, 25–14, 26–21
Pts: Németh 18; Rebs: Czigler 7 Asts: Németh 6		Pts: Beghin 16; Rebs: Beghin, Van Den Spiegel 6 Asts: Moors, Stas 3

Paks
Attendance: 2,000
Referees: Ivo Dolinek (CZE), Jaroslav Janac (SVK), Tomasz Kudlicki (POL)

8 Sep 2004
19:00

Boxscore

Ukraine	61–81	Germany
Scoring by quarter: 16–20, 13–15, 13–26, 19–20
Pts: Drozdov 19; Rebs: Drozdov 6 Asts: Khryapa 3		Pts: Nowitzki 29; Rebs: Nowitzki 10; Asts: Wucherer 5

FSK Olymp, Yuzhne
Attendance: 2,000
Referees: Stelian Banica (ROU), Seffi Shemmesh (ISR), Gennadi Ponomarev (RUS)

11 Sep 2004
19:00

Boxscore

Germany	82–72	Hungary
Scoring by quarter: 19–22, 11–16, 22–10, 30–24
Pts: Nowitzki 32; Rebs: Nowitzki 10; Asts: Wucherer, Nowitzki 3		Pts: Kálmán, Báder 14; Rebs: Németh 5 Asts: Simon 4

Volkswagen Halle, Braunschweig
Attendance: 5,940
Referees: Chantal Julien (FRA), Oscar Lefwerth (SWE), Karel Kraaijeveld (NED)

11 Sep 2004
20:15

Boxscore

Belgium	81–85	Ukraine
Scoring by quarter: 28–16, 13–26, 20–19, 20–24
Pts: Stas 23; Rebs: Hervelle 10; Asts: Moors 5		Pts: Lishchuk 20; Rebs: Balashov, Lishchuk 8 Asts: Drozdov 4

Spiroudome, Charleroi
Attendance: 2,500
Referees: José Araujo (POR), Antonio Gallo (ESP), Keith Williams (ENG)

15 Sep 2004
18:00

Boxscore

Hungary	90–67 (OT)	Ukraine
Scoring by quarter: 19–19, 25–14, 24–14, 22–20, Overtime: 9–14
Pts: Bencze 20; Rebs: Bencze, Czigler 8 Asts: Simon 4		Pts: Lishchuk 16; Rebs: Lishchuk 5 Asts: Drozdov, Lishchuk 2

Kaposvár
Attendance: 1,000
Referees: Vaclav Lukes (CZE), Zoran Sutulovic (MNE), Marius Ciulin (ROU)

15 Sep 2004
19:15

Boxscore

Germany	81–61	Belgium
Scoring by quarter: 22–15, 17–15, 22–9, 20–22
Pts: Okulaja 22; Rebs: Nowitzki 14; Asts: Hamann 4		Pts: Mutumbo Kabongo 13; Rebs: Hervelle 10; Asts: Hervelle, Moors 3

Dortmund
Attendance: 4,000
Referees: Richard Stokes (ENG), Nicolaas Zwiep (NED), Apostolos Kalpakas (SWE)

18 Sep 2004
15:30

Boxscore

Germany	95–69	Ukraine
Scoring by quarter: 25–14, 17–18, 28–13, 25–24
Pts: Okulaja 21; Rebs: Okulaja, Arigbabu 10; Asts: Herber, Okulaja, Garrett, Hamann 3		Pts: Lishchuk 14; Rebs: Kobzystyy 7 Asts: Lebediev 4

Nürnberg
Attendance: 4,500
Referees: Luigi Lamonica (ITA), Lahdo Sharro (SWE), Regis Bardera (FRA)

18 Sep 2004
20:15

Boxscore

Belgium	101–97 (OT)	Hungary
Scoring by quarter: 21–25, 23–15, 13–21, 13–9, Overtime: 8–8, 11–11, 12–8
Pts: Moors 24; Rebs: Hervelle 16; Asts: Moors 6		Pts: Németh 28; Rebs: Czigler 14; Asts: Kálmán 4

Spiroudome, Charleroi
Attendance: 3,000
Referees: Guerrino Cerebuch (ITA), Nikolaos Mpotitsis (SWE), Kristinn Oskarsson (ISL)

22 Sep 2004
19:00

Boxscore

Hungary	70–78	Germany
Scoring by quarter: 27–18, 15–22, 15–14, 13–24
Pts: Németh 18; Rebs: Báder 12; Asts: Németh 5		Pts: Nowitzki 27; Rebs: Nowitzki 17; Asts: Wucherer 4

Budapest
Attendance: 4,000
Referees: Tomasz Kudlicki (POL), Marko Vuckovic (SLO), Gianluca Mattioli (ITA)

22 Sep 2004
19:00

Boxscore

Ukraine	89–78	Belgium
Scoring by quarter: 28–15, 20–18, 22–25, 19–20
Pts: Kobzystyy 25; Rebs: Lishchuk 9 Asts: Drozdov 5		Pts: Moors 20; Rebs: Hervelle 13; Asts: Stas 4

FSK Olymp, Yuzhne
Attendance: 1,500
Referees: Henrykh Bekish (BLR), Stelian Banica (ROU), Marcin Kowalski (POL)

25 Sep 2004
17:00

Boxscore

Ukraine	77–70	Hungary
Scoring by quarter: 19–16, 25–15, 16–22, 17–17
Pts: Lishchuk 20; Rebs: Lebediev 9 Asts: Kobzystyy 4		Pts: Czigler, Németh 16; Rebs: Czigler 12; Asts: Simon, Németh 3

FSK Olymp, Yuzhne
Attendance: 2,000
Referees: Memduh Öget (TUR), Virginijus Dovidavicius (LTU), Fedor Dmitriev (BLR)

25 Sep 2004
20:15

Boxscore

Belgium	72–84	Germany
Scoring by quarter: 24–23, 13–18, 22–17, 13–26
Pts: Hervelle 24; Rebs: Hervelle 11; Asts: Moors 3		Pts: Wucherer 20; Rebs: Arigbabu 9 Asts: Nikagbatse, Femerling 5

Spiroudome, Charleroi
Attendance: 2,000
Referees: José Araujo (POR), Nikolaos Zavlanos (GRE), Chris Dodds (GBR)

==== Group 4 ====
Team	Pld	W	L	PF	PA	PD	Pts	Tie
France	6	5	1	510	445	+65	11	1–1, 0, +65
Slovenia	6	5	1	474	415	+59	11	1–1, 0, -59
Czech Republic	6	1	5	447	502	−55	7	1–1, +17
Poland	6	1	5	424	493	−69	7	1–1, -17

Rules=1) Points; 2) Head-to-head results; 3) Points difference; 4) Points scored.

8 Sep 2004
18:30

Boxscore

Slovenia	77–61	France
Scoring by quarter: 20–19, 24–12, 16–16, 17–14
Pts: Udrih 18; Rebs: Tusek 11; Asts: Nesterovic 4		Pts: Marquis 17; Rebs: F. Pietrus 5 Asts: Diarra 6

Zlatorog Sport Centre, Celje
Attendance: 3,700
Referees: Boris Schmidt (GER), Zoran Zlatevski (MKD), Zoran Sutulovic (MNE)

8 Sep 2004
19:00

Boxscore

Czech Republic	82–57	Poland
Scoring by quarter: 17–15, 17–13, 25–16, 23–13
Pts: Sokolovsky 22; Rebs: Starosta 7 Asts: Czudek 7		Pts: Dylewicz 16; Rebs: Dylewicz 6 Asts: Elliott 2

CEZ Sportovni Hala Nymburk, Nymburk
Attendance: 1,000
Referees: Peter Vigh (HUN), Lahdo Sharro (SWE), Oliver Krause (GER)

11 Sep 2004
13:30

Boxscore

Poland	71–80	Slovenia
Scoring by quarter: 23–18, 14–29, 15–13, 19–20
Pts: Pluta 15; Rebs: Roszyk 5 Asts: Roszyk, Dylewicz 2		Pts: Tusek 23; Rebs: Nesterovic 9 Asts: Udrih 4

Wrocław
Attendance: 1,500
Referees: Volodymyr Drabikovskyi (UKR), Miroslav Kuzmiak(SVK), Roger Schwarz (GER)

11 Sep 2004
18:15

Boxscore

France	89–56	Czech Republic
Scoring by quarter: 24–10, 25–11, 20–15, 20–20
Pts: Giffa 16; Rebs: F. Pietrus 10; Asts: Fauthoux 5		Pts: Starosta 15; Rebs: Starosta 7 Asts: Pavlík, Cernosek 3

Les Arênes, Metz
Attendance: 3,600
Referees: Serge De Coster (BEL), Richard Stokes (ENG), Robert Lottermoser (GER)

15 Sep 2004
18:00

Boxscore

Czech Republic	70–71	Slovenia
Scoring by quarter: 13–20, 27–18, 15–20, 15–13
Pts: Czudek 12; Rebs: Starosta 11; Asts: Cernosek 4		Pts: Tusek 19; Rebs: Nesterovic, Tusek 8 Asts: Udrih 5

Prostějov
Attendance: 1,600
Referees: Stelian Banica (ROU), Dimitar Gologanov (BUL), Peter Bodnar (HUN)

15 Sep 2004
20:30

Boxscore

France	85–65	Poland
Scoring by quarter: 26–16, 18–14, 18–12, 23–23
Pts: Diaw 16; Rebs: F. Pietrus 8 Asts: Digbeu 4		Pts: Dylewicz 14; Rebs: Elliott, Dylewicz, Lampe 6 Asts: Elliott 5

Palais Omnisports de Paris Bercy, Paris
Attendance: 3,500
Referees: Fernand Hengel (LUX), Philippe Leemann (SUI), Christos Mastraftsis (GRE)

18 Sep 2004
13:30

Boxscore

Poland	86–78	Czech Republic
Scoring by quarter: 23–11, 25–24, 22–24, 16–19
Pts: Pluta, Korytek 20; Rebs: Lampe 7 Asts: Elliott 5		Pts: Necas 20; Rebs: Necas 7 Asts: Benes 5

Wrocław
Attendance: 1,500
Referees: Virginijus Dovidavicius (LTU), Vicente Bulto (ESP), Sergey Mikhaylov (RUS)

18 Sep 2004
17:00

Boxscore

France	85–69	Slovenia
Scoring by quarter: 29–20, 11–16, 27–18, 18–15
Pts: Diaw 26; Rebs: Diaw 9 Asts: Gomis, Diaw 5		Pts: Becirovic 23; Rebs: Jurković 11; Asts: Jurak, Lakovic, Becirovic, Jurković 2

Le Colisée, Chalon-sur-Saône
Attendance: 3,500
Referees: Raul Chaves (ARG), Oscar Lefwerth (SWE), Gianluca Mattioli (ITA)

22 Sep 2004
18:00

Boxscore

Czech Republic	95–104 (OT)	France
Scoring by quarter: 24–25, 19–15, 14–16, 20–21, Overtime: 9–9, 9–18
Pts: Starosta 18; Rebs: Starosta 10; Asts: Czudek 5		Pts: Fauthoux 21; Rebs: F. Pietrus 10; Asts: Gomis, Foirest, Digbeu 2

Opava
Attendance: 1,500
Referees: Nikolaos Papadimitriou (GRE), Mehmet Keseratar (TUR), Volodymyr Drabikovskyi (UKR)

22 Sep 2004
20:05

Boxscore

Slovenia	82–62	Poland
Scoring by quarter: 15–17, 22–16, 24–15, 21–14
Pts: Lakovic 22; Rebs: Jurak, Maravic 7 Asts: Lakovic 4		Pts: Pluta 12; Rebs: Dylewicz, Lampe 5 Asts: Pluta 1

Maribor
Attendance: 2,000
Referees: Davorin Nakic (CRO), Richard Stokes (ENG), Luigi Lamonica (ITA)

25 Sep 2004
13:30

Boxscore

Poland	83–86	France
Scoring by quarter: 14–23, 24–25, 16–23, 29–15
Pts: Lampe 27; Rebs: Lampe 8 Asts: Elliott 6		Pts: Digbeu 17; Rebs: Marquis, F. Pietrus 6 Asts: Fauthoux 5

Wrocław
Attendance: 1,500
Referees: Konstantinos Koromilas (GRE), Vladimir Okhrimenko (RUS), Zlatin Karanikolov (BUL)

25 Sep 2004
17:00

Boxscore

Slovenia	95–66	Czech Republic
Scoring by quarter: 35–11, 16–22, 18–13, 26–20
Pts: Zagorac 15; Rebs: Maravic 5 Asts: Lakovic 5		Pts: Starosta 16; Rebs: Starosta 8 Asts: Hájek 3

Škofja Loka
Attendance: 1,200
Referees: Marjan Stojovski (MKD), Ademir Zurapovic (BIH), Gianluca Mattioli (ITA)

==== Group 5 ====
Team	Pld	W	L	PF	PA	PD	Pts	Tie
Turkey	6	6	0	465	363	+102	12	
Bosnia and Herzegovina	6	4	2	454	420	+34	10	
Netherlands	6	1	5	406	481	−75	7	1–1, +1
Estonia	6	1	5	428	489	−61	7	1–1, -1

Rules=1) Points; 2) Head-to-head results; 3) Points difference; 4) Points scored.

8 Sep 2004
17:00

Boxscore

Bosnia and Herzegovina	65–75	Turkey
Scoring by quarter: 24–21, 17–20, 8–14, 16–20
Pts: Mrsic 18; Rebs: Krupalija, Hukic 4 Asts: Kovacevic 3		Pts: Okur 20; Rebs: Solak 6 Asts: Arslan 4

Sport Hall Skenderija, Sarajevo
Attendance: 6,000
Referees: Tomislav Kovacic (SLO), Nikolaos Karoussis (GRE), Luigi Lamonica (ITA)

8 Sep 2004
18:00

Boxscore

Estonia	91–88	Netherlands
Scoring by quarter: 23–26, 26–20, 17–26, 25–16
Pts: Müürsepp 22; Rebs: Tein 8 Asts: Kriisa 5		Pts: Akerboom 24; Rebs: Elson 9 Asts: Van der Holst 4

Arena of BC Kalev, Tallinn
Attendance: 3,000
Referees: Virginijus Dovidavicius (LTU), Sergey Bulanov (RUS), Olegs Latisevs (LAT)

11 Sep 2004
19:30

Boxscore

Turkey	85–57	Estonia
Scoring by quarter: 29–14, 24–12, 8–19, 24–12
Pts: Türkoglu 19; Rebs: Gönlüm 9 Asts: Tunçeri 5		Pts: Müürsepp 13; Rebs: Ärmpalu 8 Asts: Kullamäe 4

Abdi İpekçi Arena, Istanbul
Attendance: 6,000
Referees: Shay Shtriks (BUL), Dimitar Gologanov (BUL), Dragan Kralj (BIH)

11 Sep 2004
19:30

Boxscore

Netherlands	77–82	Bosnia and Herzegovina
Scoring by quarter: 21–30, 21–10, 15–23, 20–19
Pts: Elson 18; Rebs: Elson 12; Asts: Krieger, Elson 6		Pts: Mrsic 23; Rebs: Ovcina 7 Asts: Kovacevic 6

Maaspoort, 's-Hertogenbosch
Attendance: 2,500
Referees: Hermann Latz (GER), Eduardo Sancha (ESP), Eddie Viator (FRA)

15 Sep 2004
18:00

Boxscore

Estonia	61–70	Bosnia and Herzegovina
Scoring by quarter: 28–11, 11–21, 12–20, 10–18
Pts: Müürsepp 20; Rebs: Müürsepp 7 Asts: Kullamäe 4		Pts: Hukic 18; Rebs: Hukic 10; Asts: Mrsic, Bajramovic 2

Arena of BC Kalev, Tallinn
Attendance: 3,500
Referees: Janne Muurinen (FIN), Grzegorz Ziemblicki (POL), Sergey Krug (RUS)

15 Sep 2004
19:30

Boxscore

Turkey	83–59	Netherlands
Scoring by quarter: 23–14, 21–15, 27–12, 12–18
Pts: Türkoglu 21; Rebs: Okur 8 Asts: Okur 5		Pts: Akerboom 13; Rebs: Van Paassen 8 Asts: Krieger 4

Abdi İpekçi Arena, Istanbul
Attendance: 5,000
Referees: Marcello Reatto (ITA), Marin Mehandjiev (BUL), Zaza Machaladze (GEO)

18 Sep 2004
19:30

Boxscore

Netherlands	76–72	Estonia
Scoring by quarter: 21–18, 16–15, 17–16, 22–23
Pts: Van Paassen 16; Rebs: Nahar 8 Asts: Krieger, Defares 6		Pts: Tein 21; Rebs: Allingu, Ärmpalu 5 Asts: Kullamäe 4

Maaspoort, 's-Hertogenbosch
Attendance: 1,750
Referees: Richard Stokes (ENG), Eric Bertrand (SUI), Rune Ressel Larsen (DEN)

18 Sep 2004
19:30

Boxscore

Turkey	77–59	Bosnia and Herzegovina
Scoring by quarter: 23–14, 16–12, 19–14, 19–19
Pts: Türkoglu 18; Rebs: Türkoglu, Okur 8 Asts: Tunçeri, Türkoglu 4		Pts: Krasic 12; Rebs: Castle, Radojevic 10; Asts: Castle 4

Abdi İpekçi Arena, Istanbul
Attendance: 5,000
Referees: Stelian Banica (ROU), Yaron Zarif (ISR), Branislav Mrdak (SRB)

22 Sep 2004
18:00

Boxscore

Estonia	76–78	Turkey
Scoring by quarter: 20–19, 24–27, 16–15, 16–17
Pts: Müürsepp 21; Rebs: Müürsepp 10; Asts: Kriisa 6		Pts: Türkoglu 21; Rebs: Gönlüm 10; Asts: Türkoglu, Arslan, Kurtoglu 2

Arena of BC Kalev, Tallinn
Attendance: 3,000
Referees: Virginijus Dovidavicius (LTU), Juris Kokainis (LAT), Lahdo Sharro (SWE)

22 Sep 2004
20:15

Boxscore

Bosnia and Herzegovina	86–59	Netherlands
Scoring by quarter: 25–11, 16–12, 24–17, 21–19
Pts: Hukic 23; Rebs: Jazvin, Radojevic 5 Asts: Castle 7		Pts: Timmermans 17; Rebs: Van Paassen 8 Asts: Defares 2

SKPC Mejdan, Tuzla
Attendance: 5,000
Referees: Dimitar Gologanov (BUL), Zoran Sutulovic (MNE), Sreten Radovic (CRO)

25 Sep 2004
19:30

Boxscore

Netherlands	47–67	Turkey
Scoring by quarter: 13–15, 17–22, 10–15, 7–15
Pts: Heinen 11; Rebs: Nahar 14; Asts: Krieger 4		Pts: Tunçeri 18; Rebs: Solak 10; Asts: Tunçeri 3

Maaspoort, 's-Hertogenbosch
Attendance: 2,000
Referees: Ivo Dolinek (CZE), Grzegorz Ziemblicki (POL), Eric Bertrand (SUI)

25 Sep 2004
20:15

Boxscore

Bosnia and Herzegovina	92–71	Estonia
Scoring by quarter: 23–17, 18–14, 30–25, 21–15
Pts: Castle 15; Rebs: Krupalija, Valjevac 6 Asts: Castle 6		Pts: Kullamäe 17; Rebs: Allingu 4 Asts: Arbet 2

Sport Hall Skenderija, Sarajevo
Attendance: 4,000
Referees: Davorin Nakic (CRO), Lazaros Voreadis (GRE), Iskren Manolov (BUL)

=== Additional qualifying round ===
Advanced to final qualifying stage
Competed for relegation

==== Group A ====
Team	Pld	W	L	PF	PA	PD	Pts	Tie
Czech Republic	4	4	0	313	271	+42	8	
Estonia	4	1	3	293	298	−5	5	1–1, +23
Poland	4	1	3	255	292	−37	5	1–1, -23

Rules=1) Points; 2) Head-to-head results; 3) Points difference; 4) Points scored.

19 Aug 2005
19:00

Boxscore

Estonia	57–75	Czech Republic
Scoring by quarter: 20–18, 19–23, 7–20, 11–14
Pts: Müürsepp 18; Rebs: Talts 7 Asts: Sokk 3		Pts: Barton 18; Rebs: Starosta 7 Asts: Welsch 4

Rakvere Spordihall, Rakvere
Attendance: 3,000
Referees: Agnis Perkons (LAT), Fedor Dmitriev (BLR), Tomas Jasevicius (LTU)

23 Aug 2005
17:00

Boxscore

Czech Republic	73–64	Poland
Scoring by quarter: 19–17, 19–17, 15–13, 20–17
Pts: Barton 24; Rebs: Starosta 11; Asts: Whitfield 5		Pts: Ignerski 17; Rebs: Bigus 8 Asts: Skibniewski, Bigus 3

Hala Sparta Praha, Prague
Referees: Branko Jovanovic (SRB), Dimitar Gologanov (BUL), Sergiy Chaykovskyy (UKR)

26 Aug 2005
18:00

Boxscore

Poland	82–76	Estonia
Scoring by quarter: 21–18, 20–12, 18–21, 23–25
Pts: Ignerski 26; Rebs: Ignerski 8 Asts: Stefanski 4		Pts: Tein 26; Rebs: Kangur 6 Asts: Tein, Leppik 4

Starogard Gdański
Attendance: 2,500
Referees: Virginijus Dovidavicius (LTU), Peter Bodnar (HUN)

29 Aug 2005
17:00

Boxscore

Czech Republic	96–86	Estonia
Scoring by quarter: 29–21, 22–24, 22–25, 23–16
Pts: Welsch 27; Rebs: Starosta 12; Asts: Czudek 5		Pts: Müürsepp 21; Rebs: Kangur 6 Asts: Leppik, Makke, Sokk 2

Arena of BK Opava, Opava
Attendance: 3,000
Referees: Petr Sudek (SVK), Giampaolo Cicoria (ITA), Ronny Denis (BEL)

1 Sep 2005
18:00

Boxscore

Poland	64–69	Czech Republic
Scoring by quarter: 22–23, 20–19, 12–14, 10–13
Pts: Ignerski 18; Rebs: Szewczyk 8 Asts: Skibniewski 6		Pts: Barton 21; Rebs: Barton 7 Asts: Czudek, Welsch 3

Hala OSIR, Włocławek
Attendance: 4,500
Referees: Romualdas Brazauskas (LTU), Stylianos Koukoulekidis (GRE), Seffi Shemmesh (ISR)

4 Sep 2005
18:00

Boxscore

Estonia	74–45	Poland
Scoring by quarter: 21–7, 18–7, 22–16, 13–15
Pts: Müürsepp 18; Rebs: Müürsepp 8 Asts: Tein 3		Pts: Szewczyk 9 Rebs: Szewczyk 7 Asts: Skibniewski 3

Arena of BC Kalev, Tallinn
Attendance: 6,000
Referees: Nikolaos Zavlanos (GRE), Vladimir Okhrimenko (RUS), Sergiy Chebyshev (UKR)

==== Group B ====
Team	Pld	W	L	PF	PA	PD	Pts
Israel	4	4	0	319	280	+39	8
Belgium	4	2	2	280	262	+18	6
Netherlands	4	0	4	252	309	−57	4

20 Aug 2005
20:00

Boxscore

Belgium	75–79	Israel
Scoring by quarter: 20–11, 24–21, 15–25, 16–22
Pts: Muya 15; Rebs: Hervelle 10; Asts: Hervelle 4		Pts: Burstein 24; Rebs: Shelef 7 Asts: Shelef 4

Arena of ABB, Leuven
Attendance: 2,300
Referees: Bruno Gasperin (FRA), Eric Bertrand (SUI), Markus Grievink (GER)

23 Aug 2005
20:00

Boxscore

Israel	89–60	Netherlands
Scoring by quarter: 22–4, 24–25, 24–19, 19–12
Pts: Tapiro 15; Rebs: Tapiro 7 Asts: Shelef 8		Pts: Flanders 11; Rebs: Flanders 8 Asts: Harris, Ormskerk 2

City Hall Nahariya, Nahariya
Attendance: 2,500
Referees: Christakis Papadamou (CYP), Zoran Zlatevski (MKD), Marin Mehandjiev (BUL)

26 Aug 2005
20:00

Boxscore

Netherlands	51–62	Belgium
Scoring by quarter: 13–17, 15–17, 8–17, 15–11
Pts: Elson 12; Rebs: Timmermans 8 Asts: Harris, Akerboom, Elson, Timmermans 1		Pts: Hervelle 21; Rebs: Hervelle, Van Dorpe 5 Asts: Beghin 4

Martinihal, Groningen
Attendance: 1,800
Referees: Guerrino Cerebuch (ITA), Dale Aitcheson (ENG)

29 Aug 2005
20:00

Boxscore

Israel	69–67	Belgium
Scoring by quarter: 17–24, 15–19, 22–12, 15–12
Pts: Green 14; Rebs: Tapiro, Green 7 Asts: Burstein, Tapiro 3		Pts: Van Dorpe 22; Rebs: Hervelle 12; Asts: Muya 3

City Hall Nahariya, Nahariya
Attendance: 2,500
Referees: Mehmet Keseratar (TUR), Nikolaos Karoussis (GRE), Marjan Stojovski (MKD)

1 Sep 2005
20:00

Boxscore

Netherlands	78–82	Israel
Scoring by quarter: 14–15, 23–19, 15–31, 26–17
Pts: Akerboom 16; Rebs: Akerboom 7 Asts: Krieger, Elson, Kingma 3		Pts: Burstein 18; Rebs: Tapiro 4 Asts: Shelef, Burstein, Tapiro 3

Martinihal, Groningen
Referees: Nikolaos Pitsilkas (GRE), Anibal Castano (FRA)

4 Sep 2005
16:00

Boxscore

Belgium	76–63	Netherlands
Scoring by quarter: 21–11, 15–17, 24–14, 16–21
Pts: Muya 18; Rebs: Mbenga 9 Asts: Muya 6		Pts: Van Paassen 16; Rebs: Harris 7 Asts: Krieger 4

Arena of ABB, Leuven
Attendance: 2,200
Referees: Ivo Dolinek (CZE), Shmuel Bachar (ISR), Fabien Conderanne (FRA)

==== Group C ====
Team	Pld	W	L	PF	PA	PD	Pts
Hungary	4	3	1	306	293	+13	7
Portugal	4	2	2	303	302	+1	6
Sweden	4	1	3	279	293	−14	5

20 Aug 2005
17:05

Boxscore

Portugal	76–87	Hungary
Scoring by quarter: 20–19, 19–21, 19–18, 18–29
Pts: Coragem Jordão 17; Rebs: da Silva, Coragem Jordão 4 Asts: da Silva 6		Pts: Dávid 23; Rebs: Gulyas 10; Asts: Kálmán, Németh 3

Pavilhão Açoreana Seguros, Lisbon
Attendance: 1,500
Referees: Juan Redondo (ESP), Marcel Cimpan (ENG), Carlos Mateus (FRA)

23 Aug 2005
17:00

Boxscore

Hungary	75–68	Sweden
Scoring by quarter: 22–15, 15–21, 16–17, 22–15
Pts: Gulyas 28; Rebs: Gulyas 8 Asts: Mészáros 5		Pts: Levin 22; Rebs: Nnamaka 6 Asts: Levin, Nnamaka, P. Larsson, Copeland 2

Arena of Honvéd SE, Budapest
Referees: Gilles Bretagne (FRA), Sreten Radovic (CRO), Roger Harrison (ENG)

26 Aug 2005
19:00

Boxscore

Sweden	71–77	Portugal
Scoring by quarter: 21–20, 16–14, 15–19, 19–24
Pts: Copeland 15; Rebs: Kjellbom 11; Asts: Levin 8		Pts: Evora 18; Rebs: Evora 16; Asts: da Silva 6

Malmö
Attendance: 1,300
Referees: Volodymyr Drabikovskyi (UKR), Chantal Julien (FRA), Juan Carlos Garcia Gonzalez

29 Aug 2005
18:00

Boxscore

Hungary	77–76 (OT)	Portugal
Scoring by quarter: 23–22, 18–17, 14–10, 13–19, Overtime: 9–8
Pts: Gulyas 30; Rebs: Gulyas 10; Asts: Németh 4		Pts: Coragem Jordão 33; Rebs: Coragem Jordão 9 Asts: da Silva 4

Arena of Albacomp-UPC, Székesfehérvár
Attendance: 2,500
Referees: Srdan Dozai (CRO), Ademir Zurapovic (BIH), Ilija Belosevic (SRB)

1 Sep 2005
19:00

Boxscore

Sweden	73–67	Hungary
Scoring by quarter: 15–23, 27–12, 16–18, 15–14
Pts: Nyström 20; Rebs: Ringström 7 Asts: Levin 5		Pts: Gulyas 20; Rebs: Dávid 9 Asts: A. Horvát, Dávid 3

Östersunds Sporthall, Östersund
Attendance: 1,150
Referees: Kestutis Pilipauskas (LTU), Grzegorz Ziemblicki (POL), Borys Ryzhyk (UKR)

4 Sep 2005
17:00

Boxscore

Portugal	74–67	Sweden
Scoring by quarter: 17–10, 15–21, 21–18, 21–18
Pts: Coragem Jordão 18; Rebs: Coragem Jordão 6 Asts: Reis Veiga Perdigão 6		Pts: Akyüz 16; Rebs: Akyüz, Nnamaka 5 Asts: Levin 6

Municipal Hall Tondela, Tondela
Attendance: 1,600
Referees: Dubravko Muhvic (CRO), Regis Bardera (FRA)

=== Final qualifying stage ===
Qualified for FIBA EuroBasket 2005

Times given below are in Central European Summer Time (UTC+2).

Team	Pld	W	L	PF	PA	PD	Pts
Israel	2	2	0	166	147	+19	4
Hungary	2	1	1	153	162	−9	3
Czech Republic	2	0	2	157	167	−10	2

11 September 2005
20:00

Boxscore

Hungary	84–79	Czech Republic
Scoring by quarter: 26–18, 15–17, 25–20, 18–24
Pts: Báder 21; Rebs: Báder 11; Asts: Mészáros 4		Pts: Welsch 16; Rebs: Benda 7 Asts: Whitfield 6

Novi Sad, Serbia

12 September 2005
20:00

Boxscore

Czech Republic	78–83	Israel
Scoring by quarter: 26–21, 19–21, 15–16, 18–25
Pts: Milos 15; Rebs: Sokolovsky 9 Asts: Whitfield 7		Pts: Burstein 16; Rebs: Burstein 7 Asts: Burstein 4

Novi Sad, Serbia

13 September 2005
20:00

Boxscore

Israel	83–69	Hungary
Scoring by quarter: 23–17, 17–17, 18–20, 25–15
Pts: Tapiro 18; Rebs: Green 7 Asts: Burstein, Tapiro 2		Pts: Gulyas 25; Rebs: Dávid 10; Asts: Németh 4

Novi Sad, Serbia

=== Relegation stage ===
Relegated to Division B

Times given below are in Central European Summer Time (UTC+2).

Team	Pld	W	L	PF	PA	PD	Pts
Sweden	2	2	0	145	120	+25	4
Netherlands	2	1	1	161	154	+7	3
Poland	2	0	2	131	163	−32	2

11 September 2005
17:30

Boxscore

Poland	55–67	Sweden
Scoring by quarter: 16–20, 18–15, 6–14, 15–18
Pts: Ignerski 21; Rebs: Ignerski 10; Asts: Skibniewski, Ignerski, Szubarga, Bigus 1		Pts: Levin 21; Rebs: Kjellbom, Jönzén 6 Asts: Levin 5

Novi Sad, Serbia

12 September 2005
17:30

Boxscore

Sweden	78–65	Netherlands
Scoring by quarter: 27–17, 13–17, 19–17, 19–14
Pts: Ringström 22; Rebs: Nnamaka 9 Asts: Akyüz, Nyström, Levin 2		Pts: Kingma 20; Rebs: Van Paassen 11; Asts: Krieger 3

Novi Sad, Serbia

13 September 2005
17:30

Boxscore

Netherlands	96–76	Poland
Scoring by quarter: 20–16, 29–20, 26–19, 21–21
Pts: Akerboom 20; Rebs: Akerboom, Timmermans, Kingma 7 Asts: Steenvoorde 5		Pts: Ignerski 15; Rebs: Bigus 7 Asts: Skibniewski 4

Novi Sad, Serbia

== Division B ==
=== Qualification games ===
All times are local.

17 September 2005
17:00

Boxscore

Ireland	80–66	Denmark
Scoring by quarter: 17–15, 29–19, 20–11, 14–21
Pts: Conlon 14; Rebs: Bowdler 8 Asts: Bree 4		Pts: Thuesen 15; Rebs: Drejer, Johansen 6 Asts: Johansen, Iversen 1

National Basketball Arena, Dublin, Ireland
Attendance: 1,200

17 September 2005
18:00

Boxscore

Austria	75–101	Macedonia
Scoring by quarter: 27–26, 10–33, 25–22, 13–20
Pts: Mayes 27; Rebs: Volcic 6 Asts: Hütter, Ortner, Knabl, Kohlmaier, Mayes, Volcic 1		Pts: Stefanov 25; Rebs: Stefanov 6 Asts: Stefanov 4

Volksbank-Arena Gmunden, Gmunden, Austria
Attendance: 1,100

24 September 2005
15:00

Boxscore

Denmark	86–70 (OT)	Ireland
Scoring by quarter: 22–15, 17–9, 15–14, 20–22, Overtime: 12–10
Pts: Drejer 39; Rebs: Johansen 9 Asts: Thuesen 10		Pts: Callahan 22; Rebs: Callahan 8 Asts: Bree 4
Denmark won series 152–150, qualifies to Division A

Aarhus, Denmark
Attendance: 1,225

24 September 2005
15:00

Boxscore

Macedonia	99–62	Austria
Scoring by quarter: 26–20, 22–10, 27–16, 24–16
Pts: Antić 16; Rebs: Stefanov, Chekovski, Gechevski, Stik 4 Asts: Stefanov 10		Pts: Ortner, Knabl 14; Rebs: Volcic 11; Asts: Schreiner 5
Macedonia won series 2–0, qualifies to Division A

Skopje, Macedonia
Attendance: 2,500
