= FIBA EuroBasket 2005 squads =

The following is the list of squads for each of the 16 teams competing in the FIBA EuroBasket 2005, held in Serbia and Montenegro between 15 and 25 September 2005. Each team selected a squad of 12 players for the tournament.

== Group A ==
=== Germany ===
Germany men's national basketball team roster
Players
Coaches

Pos.	No.	Name	Age – Date of birth	Height	Club	Ctr.
G	4	Mithat Demirel	27 – 10 May 1978	1.81 m (5 ft 11 in)	Alba Berlin	(Germany)
SG	5	Robert Garrett	28 – 18 March 1977	1.92 m (6 ft 4 in)	Pompea Napoli	(Italy)
G	6	Demond Greene	26 – 15 June 1979	1.86 m (6 ft 1 in)	Bayer Giants Leverkusen	(Germany)
G	7	Marko Pesic	28 – 6 December 1976	1.97 m (6 ft 6 in)	RheinEnergie Köln	(Germany)
G	8	Denis Wucherer	32 – 7 May 1973	1.96 m (6 ft 5 in)	Bayer Giants Leverkusen	(Germany)
PG	9	Pascal Roller	28 – 20 November 1976	1.80 m (5 ft 11 in)	Opel Skyliners	(Germany)
G	10	Misan Haldin	23 – 7 July 1982	1.93 m (6 ft 4 in)	Sedima Roseto	(Italy)
PF	11	Sven Schultze	27 – 11 July 1978	2.08 m (6 ft 10 in)	Armani Jeans Milano	(Italy)
C	12	Stephen Arigbabu	33 – 15 February 1972	2.06 m (6 ft 9 in)	Sedima Roseto	(Italy)
C	13	Patrick Femerling	30 – 4 March 1975	2.15 m (7 ft 1 in)	Panathinaikos	(Greece)
F	14	Dirk Nowitzki	27 – 19 June 1978	2.13 m (7 ft 0 in)	Dallas Mavericks	(United States)
C	15	Robert Maras	26 – 20 October 1978	2.15 m (7 ft 1 in)	Caja San Fernando	(Spain)

Head coach

- Dirk Bauermann

Legend

- Club – describes last
  club before the tournament
- Age – describes age
  on 15 September 2005

=== Italy ===
Italy men's national basketball team roster
Players
Coaches

Pos.	No.	Name	Age – Date of birth	Height	Club	Ctr.
F	4	Dante Calabria	31 – 8 November 1973	1.96 m (6 ft 5 in)	Armani Jeans Milano	(Italy)
SG	5	Gianluca Basile	30 – 24 January 1975	1.92 m (6 ft 4 in)	Climamio Bologna	(Italy)
F	6	Giacomo Galanda	30 – 30 January 1975	2.10 m (6 ft 11 in)	Montepaschi Siena	(Italy)
G/F	7	Matteo Soragna	29 – 26 December 1975	1.97 m (6 ft 6 in)	Benetton Treviso	(Italy)
C	8	Denis Marconato	30 – 29 July 1975	2.11 m (6 ft 11 in)	Benetton Treviso	(Italy)
G	9	Gianmarco Pozzecco	33 – 15 September 1972	1.80 m (5 ft 11 in)	Climamio Bologna	(Italy)
G	10	Alex Righetti	28 – 14 August 1977	2.00 m (6 ft 7 in)	Lottomatica Roma	(Italy)
F	11	Stefano Mancinelli	22 – 17 March 1983	2.08 m (6 ft 10 in)	Climamio Bologna	(Italy)
G	12	Massimo Bulleri	28 – 10 September 1977	1.88 m (6 ft 2 in)	Benetton Treviso	(Italy)
G	13	Marco Mordente	26 – 7 January 1979	1.90 m (6 ft 3 in)	Bipop Carire Reggio Emilia	(Italy)
C	14	Roberto Chiacig	30 – 1 December 1974	2.10 m (6 ft 11 in)	Montepaschi Siena	(Italy)
C	15	Angelo Gigli	22 – 4 June 1983	2.10 m (6 ft 11 in)	Bipop Carire Reggio Emilia	(Italy)

Head coach

- Carlo Recalcati

Legend

- Club – describes last
  club before the tournament
- Age – describes age
  on 15 September 2005

=== Russia ===
Russia men's national basketball team roster
Players
Coaches

Pos.	No.	Name	Age – Date of birth	Height	Club	Ctr.
G/F	4	Anton Ponkrashov	19 – 23 April 1986	2.02 m (6 ft 8 in)	Spartak Saint Petersburg	(Russia)
PG	5	Jon Robert Holden	29 – 16 August 1976	1.84 m (6 ft 0 in)	CSKA Moscow	(Russia)
C	6	Fedor Likholitov	25 – 14 March 1980	2.10 m (6 ft 11 in)	Dynamo Moscow	(Russia)
SG	7	Vitaly Fridzon	19 – 14 October 1985	1.96 m (6 ft 5 in)	Khimki	(Russia)
F/C	8	Nikita Morgunov	30 – 29 June 1975	2.11 m (6 ft 11 in)	Zenit Saint Petersburg	(Russia)
PG	9	Petr Samoylenko	28 – 7 February 1977	1.85 m (6 ft 1 in)	UNICS Kazan	(Russia)
F	10	Victor Khryapa	23 – 3 August 1982	2.03 m (6 ft 8 in)	Portland Trail Blazers	(United States)
SG	11	Zakhar Pashutin	31 – 3 May 1974	1.96 m (6 ft 5 in)	CSKA Moscow	(Russia)
F	12	Sergei Monia	22 – 15 April 1983	2.03 m (6 ft 8 in)	CSKA Moscow	(Russia)
F	13	Andrei Kirilenko	24 – 18 February 1981	2.09 m (6 ft 10 in)	Utah Jazz	(United States)
G	14	Andrei Ivanov	21 – 21 April 1984	1.98 m (6 ft 6 in)
C	15	Aleksey Savrasenko	26 – 28 February 1979	2.15 m (7 ft 1 in)	CSKA Moscow	(Russia)

Head coach

- Sergei Babkov

Legend

- Club – describes last
  club before the tournament
- Age – describes age
  on 15 September 2005

=== Ukraine ===
Ukraine men's national basketball team roster
Players
Coaches

Pos.	No.	Name	Age – Date of birth	Height	Club	Ctr.
G	4	Andrii Lebediev	25 – 12 October 1979	1.89 m (6 ft 2 in)
	5	Artem Butskyy	24 – 24 August 1981
	6	Viktor Kobzystyy	26 – 7 March 1979
C	7	Stanislav Balashov	26 – 2 June 1979	2.11 m (6 ft 11 in)
	8	Igor Kryvych	26 – 14 December 1978
G	9	Volodymyr Koval	25 – 28 December 1979	1.97 m (6 ft 6 in)
G	10	Oleksandr Rayevskyy	29 – 31 August 1976	1.77 m (5 ft 10 in)
	11	Rostyslav Kryvych	26 – 14 December 1978
C	12	Sergei Lishouk	23 – 31 March 1982	2.10 m (6 ft 11 in)	Khimik Yuzhny	(Ukraine)
	13	Oleksiy Pecherov	19 – 8 December 1985		BC Kyiv	(Ukraine)
C	14	Volodymyr Gurtovyy	30 – 9 September 1975	2.07 m (6 ft 9 in)
C	15	Slava Medvedenko	26 – 4 April 1979	2.08 m (6 ft 10 in)	Los Angeles Lakers	(United States)

Head coach

- Gennadi Zaschuk

Legend

- Club – describes last
  club before the tournament
- Age – describes age
  on 15 September 2005

== Group B ==
=== Bulgaria ===
Bulgaria men's national basketball team roster
Players
Coaches

Pos.	No.	Name	Age – Date of birth	Height	Club	Ctr.
	4	Dejan Ivanov	19 – 18 March 1986	2.05 m (6 ft 9 in)	Avtodor Saratov	(Russia)
	5	Kaloyan Ivanov	19 – 18 March 1986	2.06 m (6 ft 9 in)	Avtodor Saratov	(Russia)
C	6	Tenčo Banev	25 – 14 August 1980	2.07 m (6 ft 9 in)	BC Odesa	(Ukraine)
G	7	Yulian Radionov	26 – 1 July 1979	1.87 m (6 ft 2 in)	Lukoil Academic	(Bulgaria)
	8	Filip Videnov	25 – 12 June 1980	1.95 m (6 ft 5 in)	SLUC Nancy	(France)
	9	Yordan Bozov	26 – 25 January 1979		CSKA Sofia	(Bulgaria)
	10	Georgi Davidov	29 – 2 August 1976		Lukoil Academic	(Bulgaria)
F	11	Dimitar Angelov	26 – 25 August 1979	2.02 m (6 ft 8 in)	CSKA Sofia	(Bulgaria)
PF	12	Stefan Georgiev	27 – 20 March 1978	2.06 m (6 ft 9 in)	CSKA Sofia	(Bulgaria)
C	13	Boyko Mladenov	24 – 2 March 1981	2.12 m (6 ft 11 in)	Lukoil Academic	(Bulgaria)
F	14	Hrisimir Dimitrov	31 – 21 June 1974	1.97 m (6 ft 6 in)	Spartak Pleven	(Bulgaria)
G	15	Todor Stoykov	28 – 3 March 1977	1.98 m (6 ft 6 in)	Lukoil Academic	(Bulgaria)

Head coach

- Rosen Barchovski

Legend

- Club – describes last
  club before the tournament
- Age – describes age
  on 15 September 2005

=== Croatia ===
Croatia men's national basketball team roster
Players
Coaches

Pos.	No.	Name	Age – Date of birth	Height	Club	Ctr.
C	4	Mario Kasun	25 – 5 April 1980	2.16 m (7 ft 1 in)	Orlando Magic	(United States)
G	5	Roko Ukić	20 – 5 December 1984	1.96 m (6 ft 5 in)	Croatia Osiguranje	(Croatia)
G	6	Marko Popović	23 – 12 June 1982	1.85 m (6 ft 1 in)	Cibona Zagreb	(Croatia)
C	7	Nikola Vujčić	27 – 14 June 1978	2.11 m (6 ft 11 in)	Maccabi Tel Aviv	(Israel)
C	8	Nikola Prkačin	29 – 15 November 1975	2.08 m (6 ft 10 in)	Efes Pilsen	(Turkey)
F	9	Andrija Žižić	25 – 14 January 1980	2.06 m (6 ft 9 in)	FC Barcelona	(Spain)
G	10	Gordan Giriček	28 – 20 June 1977	1.99 m (6 ft 6 in)	Utah Jazz	(United States)
G	11	Zoran Planinić	23 – 12 September 1982	1.97 m (6 ft 6 in)	New Jersey Nets	(United States)
G	12	Marko Tomas	20 – 3 January 1985	2.02 m (6 ft 8 in)	Cibona Zagreb	(Croatia)
F	13	Matej Mamić	30 – 13 January 1975	2.02 m (6 ft 8 in)	Alba Berlin	(Germany)
C	14	Dalibor Bagarić	25 – 2 July 1980	2.17 m (7 ft 1 in)	Climamio Bologna	(Italy)
F	15	Damir Rančić	22 – 23 June 1983	1.98 m (6 ft 6 in)	Croatia Osiguranje	(Croatia)

Head coach

- Neven Spahija

Legend

- Club – describes last
  club before the tournament
- Age – describes age
  on 15 September 2005

=== Lithuania ===
Lithuania men's national basketball team roster
Players
Coaches

Pos.	No.	Name	Age – Date of birth	Height	Club	Ctr.
G	4	Vidas Ginevičius	27 – 11 May 1978	1.93 m (6 ft 4 in)	Žalgiris Kaunas	(Lithuania)
F	5	Mindaugas Žukauskas	30 – 24 August 1975	2.01 m (6 ft 7 in)	Montepaschi Siena	(Italy)
SF	6	Mindaugas Lukauskis	26 – 19 May 1979	1.98 m (6 ft 6 in)	Lietuvos rytas	(Lithuania)
C	7	Darjuš Lavrinovič	25 – 1 November 1979	2.12 m (6 ft 11 in)	Žalgiris Kaunas	(Lithuania)
G	8	Ramūnas Šiškauskas	27 – 10 September 1978	1.98 m (6 ft 6 in)	Benetton Treviso	(Italy)
PG	9	Giedrius Gustas	25 – 4 March 1980	1.90 m (6 ft 3 in)	Lokomotiv Rostov	(Russia)
F	10	Simonas Serapinas	23 – 24 February 1982	1.97 m (6 ft 6 in)	Žalgiris Kaunas	(Lithuania)
C	11	Darius Šilinskis	21 – 18 May 1984	2.16 m (7 ft 1 in)	Nevėžis	(Lithuania)
C	12	Kšyštof Lavrinovič	25 – 11 November 1979	2.10 m (6 ft 11 in)	Dynamo Moscow	(Russia)
F	13	Simas Jasaitis	23 – 26 March 1982	2.01 m (6 ft 7 in)	Lietuvos rytas	(Lithuania)
F	14	Paulius Jankūnas	21 – 29 April 1984	2.05 m (6 ft 9 in)	Žalgiris Kaunas	(Lithuania)
C	15	Robertas Javtokas	25 – 20 March 1980	2.10 m (6 ft 11 in)	Lietuvos rytas	(Lithuania)

Head coach

- Antanas Sireika

Legend

- Club – describes last
  club before the tournament
- Age – describes age
  on 15 September 2005

=== Turkey ===
Turkey men's national basketball team roster
Players
Coaches

Pos.	No.	Name	Age – Date of birth	Height	Club	Ctr.
G	4	Kerem Tunçeri	26 – 14 April 1979	1.88 m (6 ft 2 in)	Ülkerspor	(Turkey)
C	5	Ermal Kuqo	25 – 12 February 1980	2.06 m (6 ft 9 in)	Efes Pilsen	(Turkey)
F	6	Mirsad Türkcan	29 – 7 June 1976	2.05 m (6 ft 9 in)	Dynamo Moscow	(Russia)
G	7	Ender Arslan	22 – 13 January 1983	1.85 m (6 ft 1 in)	Efes Pilsen	(Turkey)
G	8	Cenk Akyol	18 – 16 April 1987	1.98 m (6 ft 6 in)	Efes Pilsen	(Turkey)
SG	9	Serkan Erdoğan	27 – 30 August 1978	1.94 m (6 ft 4 in)	Ülkerspor	(Turkey)
SG	10	İbrahim Kutluay	31 – 7 January 1974	1.98 m (6 ft 6 in)	Panathinaikos	(Greece)
C	11	Fatih Solak	25 – 25 July 1980	2.13 m (7 ft 0 in)	Ülkerspor	(Turkey)
F	12	Kerem Gönlüm	27 – 22 November 1977	2.09 m (6 ft 10 in)	Ülkerspor	(Turkey)
F	13	Mehmet Okur	26 – 26 May 1979	2.10 m (6 ft 11 in)	Utah Jazz	(United States)
F/C	14	Kaya Peker	25 – 2 August 1980	2.07 m (6 ft 9 in)	Efes Pilsen	(Turkey)
F	15	Hedo Türkoğlu	26 – 19 March 1979	2.03 m (6 ft 8 in)	Orlando Magic	(United States)

Head coach

- Bogdan Tanjević

Legend

- Club – describes last
  club before the tournament
- Age – describes age
  on 15 September 2005

== Group C ==
=== Bosnia and Herzegovina ===
Bosnia and Herzegovina men's national basketball team roster
Players
Coaches

Pos.	No.	Name	Age – Date of birth	Height	Club	Ctr.
	4	Vedran Princ	22 – 20 December 1982		Široki	(Bosnia and Herzegovina)
F	5	Elvir Ovčina	29 – 16 July 1976	2.10 m (6 ft 11 in)	Olympiacos	(Greece)
	6	Mirza Teletović	19 – 17 September 1985	2.05 m (6 ft 9 in)	Telindus Oostende	(Belgium)
C	7	Samir Lerić	32 – 12 September 1973	2.06 m (6 ft 9 in)	Polonia Warszawa	(Poland)
	8	Edin Bavčić	21 – 5 June 1984	2.09 m (6 ft 10 in)	Bosna Royal	(Bosnia and Herzegovina)
	9	Henry Domercant	24 – 30 December 1980	1.94 m (6 ft 4 in)	Efes Pilsen	(Turkey)
F	10	Siniša Kovačević	27 – 11 May 1978	2.00 m (6 ft 7 in)	Bosna Royal	(Bosnia and Herzegovina)
F	11	Mujo Tuljković	26 – 17 June 1979	2.00 m (6 ft 7 in)	Unia Tarnów	(Poland)
G	12	Damir Mršić	34 – 25 October 1970	1.88 m (6 ft 2 in)	Fenerbahçe	(Turkey)
C	9	Jasmin Hukić	26 – 15 August 1979	2.03 m (6 ft 8 in)	Hemofarm	(Serbia)
C	14	Aleksandar Radojević	29 – 8 August 1976	2.21 m (7 ft 3 in)	Asseco Prokom	(Poland)
	15	Kenan Bajramović	24 – 24 May 1981	2.05 m (6 ft 9 in)	Bosna Royal	(Bosnia and Herzegovina)

Head coach

- Mensur Bajramović

Legend

- Club – describes last
  club before the tournament
- Age – describes age
  on 15 September 2005

=== France ===
France men's national basketball team roster
Players
Coaches

Pos.	No.	Name	Age – Date of birth	Height	Club	Ctr.
G	4	Frédéric Fauthoux	32 – 6 December 1972	1.80 m (5 ft 11 in)	Pau-Orthez	(France)
SF	5	Mickaël Gelabale	22 – 22 May 1983	2.01 m (6 ft 7 in)	Real Madrid	(Spain)
G	6	Antoine Rigaudeau	33 – 17 December 1971	2.00 m (6 ft 7 in)	Pamesa Valencia	(Spain)
F/C	7	Cyril Julian	31 – 29 March 1974	2.06 m (6 ft 9 in)	Pamesa Valencia	(Spain)
SF	8	Mickaël Piétrus	23 – 7 February 1982	1.97 m (6 ft 6 in)	Golden State Warriors	(United States)
G	9	Tony Parker	23 – 17 May 1982	1.86 m (6 ft 1 in)	San Antonio Spurs	(United States)
F	10	Mamoutou Diarra	25 – 21 May 1980	2.00 m (6 ft 7 in)	Paris Basket Racing	(France)
F	11	Florent Piétrus	24 – 19 January 1981	2.01 m (6 ft 7 in)	Unicaja Málaga	(Spain)
C	12	Jérôme Schmitt	24 – 8 September 1981	2.05 m (6 ft 9 in)	JL Bourg-en-Bresse	(France)
G	13	Boris Diaw	23 – 16 April 1982	2.05 m (6 ft 9 in)	Atlanta Hawks	(United States)
C	14	Frédéric Weis	28 – 22 June 1977	2.18 m (7 ft 2 in)	Lagun Aro Bilbao	(Spain)
	15	Sacha Giffa	28 – 14 June 1977		Pau-Orthez	(France)

Head coach

- Alain Weisz

Legend

- Club – describes last
  club before the tournament
- Age – describes age
  on 15 September 2005

=== Greece ===
Greece men's national basketball team roster
Players
Coaches

Pos.	No.	Name	Age – Date of birth	Height	Club	Ctr.
G	4	Theodoros Papaloukas	28 – 8 May 1977	2.00 m (6 ft 7 in)	CSKA Moscow	(Russia)
G	5	Vassilis Spanoulis	23 – 7 August 1982	1.93 m (6 ft 4 in)	Maroussi	(Greece)
G	6	Nikos Zisis	22 – 16 August 1983	1.97 m (6 ft 6 in)	A.E.K. Athens	(Greece)
C	7	Ioannis Bourousis	21 – 17 November 1983	2.15 m (7 ft 1 in)	A.E.K. Athens	(Greece)
F	8	Panagiotis Vasilopoulos	21 – 8 February 1984	2.05 m (6 ft 9 in)	P.A.O.K.	(Greece)
F	9	Antonis Fotsis	24 – 2 April 1981	2.09 m (6 ft 10 in)	Real Madrid	(Spain)
G	10	Nikos Chatzivrettas	28 – 26 May 1977	1.97 m (6 ft 6 in)	Panathinaikos	(Greece)
PF	11	Dimos Dikoudis	28 – 24 June 1977	2.08 m (6 ft 10 in)	CSKA Moscow	(Russia)
C	12	Kostas Tsartsaris	25 – 17 October 1979	2.10 m (6 ft 11 in)	Panathinaikos	(Greece)
G	13	Dimitris Diamantidis	25 – 6 May 1980	1.96 m (6 ft 5 in)	Panathinaikos	(Greece)
C	14	Lazaros Papadopoulos	25 – 3 June 1980	2.13 m (7 ft 0 in)	Dynamo Moscow	(Russia)
F	15	Michalis Kakiouzis (C)	28 – 29 November 1976	2.07 m (6 ft 9 in)	Montepaschi Siena	(Italy)

Head coach

- Panagiotis Giannakis

Legend

- Club – describes last
  club before the tournament
- Age – describes age
  on 15 September 2005

=== Slovenia ===
Slovenia men's national basketball team roster
Players
Coaches

Pos.	No.	Name	Age – Date of birth	Height	Club	Ctr.
PF	4	Goran Jurak	28 – 4 April 1977	2.03 m (6 ft 8 in)	Sicc BPA Jesi	(Italy)
G	5	Jaka Lakovič	27 – 9 July 1978	1.76 m (5 ft 9 in)	Panathinaikos	(Greece)
G	6	Aleksandar Ćapin	22 – 6 October 1982	1.86 m (6 ft 1 in)	Panellinios	(Greece)
PG	7	Sani Bečirovič	24 – 19 May 1981	1.95 m (6 ft 5 in)	Casti Group Varese	(Italy)
C	8	Radoslav Nesterović	29 – 30 May 1976	2.13 m (7 ft 0 in)	San Antonio Spurs	(United States)
G	9	Nebojša Joksimović	23 – 17 November 1981	1.93 m (6 ft 4 in)	Pivovarna Laško	(Slovenia)
F	10	Boštjan Nachbar	25 – 3 July 1980	2.07 m (6 ft 9 in)	New Orleans Hornets	(United States)
C	11	Erazem Lorbek	21 – 21 February 1984	2.09 m (6 ft 10 in)	Climamio Bologna	(Italy)
G/F	12	Marko Milič	28 – 7 May 1977	2.00 m (6 ft 7 in)	Scavolini Pesaro	(Italy)
	13	Marko Maravič	26 – 26 June 1979		Armani Jeans Milano	(Italy)
C	14	Uroš Slokar	22 – 14 May 1983	2.10 m (6 ft 11 in)	Snaidero Udine	(Italy)
C	15	Primož Brezec	25 – 2 October 1979	2.16 m (7 ft 1 in)	Charlotte Bobcats	(United States)

Head coach

- Aleš Pipan

Legend

- Club – describes last
  club before the tournament
- Age – describes age
  on 15 September 2005

== Group D ==
=== Israel ===
Israel men's national basketball team roster
Players
Coaches

Pos.	No.	Name	Age – Date of birth	Height	Club	Ctr.
	4	Dror Hajaj	26 – 31 December 1978		Spotter Leuven	(Belgium)
G	5	Afik Nissim	24 – 31 January 1981	1.80 m (5 ft 11 in)	Strasbourg IG	(France)
F	6	Sharon Shason	26 – 16 March 1979	2.02 m (6 ft 8 in)	Ural Great Perm	(Russia)
	7	Chris Watson	30 – 16 July 1975
C	8	Erez Markovich	27 – 10 July 1978	2.08 m (6 ft 10 in)	Ironi Nahariya	(Israel)
F	9	Gur Shelef	31 – 10 January 1974	2.01 m (6 ft 7 in)	Maccabi Tel Aviv	(Israel)
G	10	Tal Burstein	25 – 19 February 1980	1.98 m (6 ft 6 in)	Maccabi Tel Aviv	(Israel)
G	11	Meir Tapiro	30 – 28 March 1975	1.92 m (6 ft 4 in)	SLUC Nancy	(France)
F	12	Moshe Mizrahi	25 – 4 April 1980	2.02 m (6 ft 8 in)	Hapoel Galil Elyon	(Israel)
SF	13	Ido Kozikaro	27 – 8 January 1978	2.02 m (6 ft 8 in)	Hapoel Jerusalem	(Israel)
C	14	Yaniv Green	25 – 16 May 1980	2.06 m (6 ft 9 in)	Maccabi Tel Aviv	(Israel)
G	15	Yotam Halperin	21 – 24 January 1984	1.93 m (6 ft 4 in)	Maccabi Tel Aviv	(Israel)

Head coach

- Zvi Sherf

Legend

- Club – describes last
  club before the tournament
- Age – describes age
  on 15 September 2005

=== Latvia ===
Latvia men's national basketball team roster
Players
Coaches

Pos.	No.	Name	Age – Date of birth	Height	Club	Ctr.
F	4	Uvis Helmanis	33 – 10 June 1972	2.04 m (6 ft 8 in)	GHP Bamberg	(Germany)
G	5	Aigars Vītols	29 – 15 February 1976	1.94 m (6 ft 4 in)	Ventspils	(Latvia)
G	6	Armands Šķēle	22 – 4 September 1983	1.92 m (6 ft 4 in)	Liège Basket	(Belgium)
G	7	Roberts Štelmahers	30 – 19 November 1974	1.75 m (5 ft 9 in)	Lietuvos rytas	(Lithuania)
G	8	Jānis Blūms	23 – 20 April 1982	1.90 m (6 ft 3 in)	Ventspils	(Latvia)
G	9	Sandis Valters	27 – 31 August 1978	1.90 m (6 ft 3 in)	BC Azovmash	(Ukraine)
G	10	Kristaps Valters	23 – 18 September 1981	1.88 m (6 ft 2 in)	EWE Baskets Oldenburg	(Germany)
F	11	Ivars Timermanis	23 – 4 February 1982	2.03 m (6 ft 8 in)	Ventspils	(Latvia)
C	12	Mārtiņš Skirmants	27 – 7 December 1977	2.05 m (6 ft 9 in)	Ventspils	(Latvia)
C	13	Raitis Grafs	24 – 12 July 1981	2.08 m (6 ft 10 in)	Śląsk Wrocław	(Poland)
F	14	Kaspars Cipruss	23 – 2 February 1982	2.07 m (6 ft 9 in)	Caja San Fernando	(Spain)
G	15	Kristaps Janičenoks	22 – 14 March 1983	1.95 m (6 ft 5 in)	Telekom Baskets Bonn	(Germany)

Head coach

- Kārlis Muižnieks

Legend

- Club – describes last
  club before the tournament
- Age – describes age
  on 15 September 2005

=== Serbia and Montenegro ===
Serbia and Montenegro men's national basketball team roster
Players
Coaches

Pos.	No.	Name	Age – Date of birth	Height	Club	Ctr.
F	4	Dejan Bodiroga	32 – 2 March 1973	2.03 m (6 ft 8 in)	FC Barcelona	(Spain)
C	5	Darko Miličić	20 – 20 June 1985	2.12 m (6 ft 11 in)	Detroit Pistons	(United States)
G	6	Vule Avdalović	23 – 24 November 1981	1.94 m (6 ft 4 in)	Pamesa Valencia	(Spain)
F	7	Vladimir Radmanović	24 – 19 November 1980	2.06 m (6 ft 9 in)	Seattle SuperSonics	(United States)
G	8	Igor Rakočević	27 – 29 March 1978	1.94 m (6 ft 4 in)	Pamesa Valencia	(Spain)
G	9	Vlado Šćepanović	29 – 13 November 1975	1.98 m (6 ft 6 in)	Panathinaikos	(Greece)
G	10	Marko Jarić	26 – 12 October 1978	1.98 m (6 ft 6 in)	Los Angeles Clippers	(United States)
C	11	Željko Rebrača	33 – 9 April 1972	2.11 m (6 ft 11 in)	Los Angeles Clippers	(United States)
C	12	Nenad Krstić	22 – 25 July 1983	2.12 m (6 ft 11 in)	New Jersey Nets	(United States)
F	13	Dejan Milojević	28 – 15 April 1977	2.00 m (6 ft 7 in)	Partizan Belgrade	(Serbia)
C	14	Dejan Tomašević	32 – 6 May 1973	2.08 m (6 ft 10 in)	Pamesa Valencia	(Spain)
F	15	Milan Gurović	30 – 17 June 1975	2.04 m (6 ft 8 in)	Joventut Badalona	(Spain)

Head coach

- Željko Obradović

Legend

- Club – describes last
  club before the tournament
- Age – describes age
  on 15 September 2005

=== Spain ===
Spain men's national basketball team roster
Players
Coaches

Pos.	No.	Name	Age – Date of birth	Height	Club	Ctr.
G	4	Rudy Fernández	20 – 4 April 1985	1.95 m (6 ft 5 in)	Joventut Badalona	(Spain)
F	5	Iker Iturbe	29 – 10 July 1976	2.00 m (6 ft 7 in)	Adecco Estudiantes	(Spain)
G	6	Carlos Cabezas	24 – 14 November 1980	1.87 m (6 ft 2 in)	Unicaja Málga	(Spain)
G	7	Juan Carlos Navarro	25 – 13 June 1980	1.93 m (6 ft 4 in)	FC Barcelona	(Spain)
G	8	José Calderón	23 – 28 September 1981	1.91 m (6 ft 3 in)	TAU Cerámica	(Spain)
F	9	Felipe Reyes	25 – 16 March 1980	2.03 m (6 ft 8 in)	Real Madrid	(Spain)
F	10	Carlos Jiménez	29 – 10 February 1976	2.05 m (6 ft 9 in)	Adecco Estudiantes	(Spain)
F	11	Sergi Vidal	24 – 9 April 1981	1.99 m (6 ft 6 in)	TAU Cerámica	(Spain)
PG	12	Sergio Rodríguez	19 – 12 June 1986	1.90 m (6 ft 3 in)	Adecco Estudiantes	(Spain)
C	13	Iñaki de Miguel	31 – 24 October 1973	2.05 m (6 ft 9 in)	Etosa Alicante	(Spain)
C	14	Fran Vázquez	22 – 1 May 1983	2.09 m (6 ft 10 in)	Unicaja Málga	(Spain)
F	15	Jorge Garbajosa	27 – 19 December 1977	2.07 m (6 ft 9 in)	Unicaja Málga	(Spain)

Head coach

- Mario Pesquera

Legend

- Club – describes last
  club before the tournament
- Age – describes age
  on 15 September 2005
