= EuroBasket 2005 =

International basketball event

Европско првенство у кошарци 2005.

Tournament details
- Host country: Serbia and Montenegro
- Dates: 16–25 September
- Teams: 16
- Venues: 5 (in 4 host cities)

Final positions
- Champions: Greece (2nd title)
- Runners-up: Germany
- Third place: France
- Fourth place: Spain

Tournament statistics
- Games played: 40
- MVP: (Germany) Dirk Nowitzki
- Top scorer: (Germany) Dirk Nowitzki (26.1 points per game)

The 2005 FIBA European Championship, commonly known as FIBA EuroBasket 2005, was the 34th FIBA EuroBasket regional basketball championship held by FIBA Europe. It also served as the European qualifier for the 2006 FIBA World Championship, awarding berths to the top six teams in the final standings. It was held in Serbia and Montenegro from 16 to 25 September 2005. Sixteen national teams entered the event under the auspices of FIBA Europe, the sport's regional governing body. The cities of Belgrade, Novi Sad, Podgorica and Vršac hosted the tournament. It was the third time that the championship was hosted by the city of Belgrade (previous times were in 1961 and 1975). Greece won its second FIBA European title by defeating Germany with a 78–62 score in the final. Germany's Dirk Nowitzki was voted the tournament's MVP.

== Venues ==
=== Belgrade ===
Awarded hosting rights in March 2002, Belgrade (the capital of Serbia and Montenegro) was the main stage of the EuroBasket 2005 action. The Pionir Hall hosted Group C's six preliminary round games, while the Belgrade Arena hosted the competition following the preliminary round.

This was the third time that the championship was hosted by the city of Belgrade. Belgrade previously hosted the European basketball championships in 1961 and 1975.

=== Podgorica ===
Podgorica's Morača Sports Center hosted Group B, where six games were played. Being in Montenegro, it was the farthest locale from the central venue.

=== Novi Sad ===
Novi Sad, nicknamed "The City of Sports", is the capital of the province of Vojvodina and home to the Spens Sports Center. The six Group D games were played there.

=== Vršac ===
Vršac was home to Group A during the tournament, and also had a total of six games played in the 5,000-person capacity Millennium Center.

Belgrade		Podgorica	Novi Sad	Vršac
Belgrade Arena; Capacity: 18,386	Pionir Hall; Capacity: 8,178	Morača Sports Center; Capacity: 4,570	Spens Sports Center; Capacity: 11,000	Millennium Center; Capacity: 5,000

== Qualification ==
Competition	Date	Vacancies	Qualified
Host nation	–	1	Serbia and Montenegro
Participant of 2004 Summer Olympics	15 – 28 August 2004	4	Greece; Italy; Lithuania; Spain
Qualified through Qualifying Round	8 – 25 September 2004	10	Bosnia and Herzegovina; Bulgaria; Croatia; France; Germany; Latvia; Russia; Slovenia; Turkey; Ukraine
Qualified through Additional Qualifying Round	19 August – 13 September 2005	1	Israel

Group A	Group B	Group C	Group D
Germany; Italy; Russia; Ukraine	Bulgaria; Croatia; Lithuania; Turkey	Bosnia and Herzegovina; France; Greece; Slovenia	Israel; Latvia; Serbia and Montenegro; Spain

== Format ==
- The teams were split in four groups of four teams each where they played a round robin. The first team from each group qualified directly to the knockout stage. To define the other four teams that advanced to the knockout stage, second and third-placed teams from each group where cross-paired (2A vs. 3B, 3A vs. 2B, 2C vs. 3D, 3C vs. 2D) and the winner from each match advanced to the quarterfinals.
- In the knockout quarterfinals, the winners advanced to the semifinals. The winners from the semifinals competed for the championship in the final, while the losing teams play a consolation game for the third place.
- The losing teams from the quarterfinals play in a separate bracket to define 5th through 8th place in the final standings.

== Squads ==
At the start of tournament, all 16 participating countries had 12 players on their roster.

== Preliminary round ==
Qualified for the quarterfinals
Qualified for the play-off games

Times given below are in Central European Summer Time (UTC+2).

=== Group A ===
Team	Pld	W	L	PF	PA	PD	Pts
Russia	3	2	1	223	186	+37	5
Germany	3	2	1	217	192	+25	5
Italy	3	2	1	244	231	+13	5
Ukraine	3	0	3	194	269	−75	3

16 September
18:00

Boxscore

Germany	82–84 (OT)	Italy
Scoring by quarter: 14–17, 20–21, 26–12, 14–24, Overtime: 8–10
Pts: Nowitzki 27; Rebs: Nowitzki 15; Asts: Nowitzki, Roller 3		Pts: Basile 25; Rebs: Galanda 10; Asts: 5 Players 2

Millennium Center, Vršac
Attendance: 4,000
Referees: Raúl Chaves (ARG), Seffi Shemmesh (ISR), Oscar Lefwerth (SWE)

16 September
21:00

Boxscore

Russia	86–74	Ukraine
Scoring by quarter: 17–22, 24–14, 18–18, 27–20
Pts: Kirilenko 22; Rebs: Kirilenko 14; Asts: Holden, Samoylenko 4		Pts: Lishouk 18; Rebs: Lishouk 12; Asts: Kobzystyy 3

Millennium Center, Vršac
Attendance: 4,000
Referees: Lazaros Voreadis (GRE), Ademir Zurapovic (BIH), Chantal Julien (FRA)

17 September
18:00

Boxscore

Italy	61–87	Russia
Scoring by quarter: 11–31, 9–21, 21–18, 20–17
Pts: Galanda 13; Rebs: Mancinelli 6 Asts: Pozzecco 4		Pts: Kirilenko 16; Rebs: Khryapa, Kirilenko 10; Asts: Holden 4

Millennium Center, Vršac
Attendance: 4,100
Referees: Lazaros Voreadis (GRE), Milivoje Jovčić (SRB), Seffi Shemmesh (ISR)

17 September
21:00

Boxscore

Ukraine	58–84	Germany
Scoring by quarter: 19–28, 13–19, 13–20, 13–17
Pts: Medvedenko 15; Rebs: Pecherov 8 Asts: Butskyy, Koval 3		Pts: Nowitzki 27; Rebs: Femerling, Roller 6 Asts: Roller, Wucherer 4

Millennium Center, Vršac
Attendance: 4,100
Referees: Raúl Chaves (ARG), Oscar Lefwerth (SWE), Chantal Julien (FRA)

18 September
18:00

Boxscore

Italy	99–62	Ukraine
Scoring by quarter: 29–18, 17–23, 22–10, 31–11
Pts: Calabria 20; Rebs: Marconato 9 Asts: Soragna 6		Pts: Lishouk 13; Rebs: I. Kryvych 8 Asts: 3 Players 2

Millennium Center, Vršac
Attendance: 4,000
Referees: Raúl Chaves (ARG), Oscar Lefwerth (SWE), Seffi Shemmesh (ISR)

18 September
21:00

Boxscore

Russia	50–51	Germany
Scoring by quarter: 10–8, 16–8, 12–18, 12–17
Pts: Holden 13; Rebs: Khryapa 12; Asts: Kirilenko 3		Pts: Nowitzki 24; Rebs: Nowitzki 19; Asts: Femerling 3

Millennium Center, Vršac
Attendance: 4,000
Referees: Lazaros Voreadis (GRE), Milivoje Jovčić (SRB), Ademir Zurapovic (BIH)

=== Group B ===
Team	Pld	W	L	PF	PA	PD	Pts
Lithuania	3	3	0	264	221	+43	6
Croatia	3	2	1	235	234	+1	5
Turkey	3	1	2	236	256	−20	4
Bulgaria	3	0	3	250	274	−24	3

16 September
18:00

Boxscore

Croatia	88–84	Bulgaria
Scoring by quarter: 21–24, 19–20, 27–24, 21–16
Pts: Giriček 22; Rebs: Giriček, Kasun 8 Asts: Planinić 3		Pts: Stoykov 27; Rebs: 3 Players 4 Asts: Angelov, Videnov 4

Morača Sports Center, Podgorica
Attendance: 3,700
Referees: Eduardo Sancha (ESP), Nikolaos Zavlanos (GRE), Arnis Ozols (LAT)

16 September
21:00

Boxscore

Turkey	75–87	Lithuania
Scoring by quarter: 13–22, 15–24, 18–19, 29–22
Pts: Türkoğlu 14; Rebs: Peker 5 Asts: Tunçeri 2		Pts: Šiškauskas 20; Rebs: Lavrinovič 9 Asts: Javtokas, Šiškauskas 3

Morača Sports Center, Podgorica
Attendance: 3,700
Referees: Shmuel Bachar (ISR), Anibal Castaño (FRA), Sasa Punkl (SLO)

17 September
18:00

Boxscore

Lithuania	85–67	Croatia
Scoring by quarter: 15–23, 19–11, 23–18, 28–15
Pts: Šiškauskas 18; Rebs: Jankūnas 7 Asts: Ginevičius 4		Pts: Giriček 19; Rebs: Giriček 6 Asts: Vujčić 3

Morača Sports Center, Podgorica
Attendance: 3,500
Referees: Eduardo Sancha (ESP), Nikolaos Zavlanos (GRE), Anibal Castaño (FRA)

17 September
21:00

Boxscore

Bulgaria	89–94	Turkey
Scoring by quarter: 23–19, 24–21, 20–17, 10–15
Pts: Videnov 23; Rebs: Mladenov 11; Asts: 3 Players 3		Pts: Türkcan 19; Rebs: Okur, Türkcan 6 Asts: Tunçeri 3

Morača Sports Center, Podgorica
Attendance: 3,500
Referees: Zoran Sutulovic (MNE), Sasa Pukl (SLO), Shmuel Bachar (ISR)

18 September
18:00

Boxscore

Lithuania	92–79	Bulgaria
Scoring by quarter: 30–19, 19–23, 20–12, 23–25
Pts: Jasaitis 17; Rebs: Javtokas 7 Asts: Ginevičius 7		Pts: Videnov 34; Rebs: Georgiev 5 Asts: Stoykov 3

Morača Sports Center, Podgorica
Attendance: 3,700
Referees: Nikolaos Zavlanos (GRE), Sasa Pukl (SLO), Arnis Ozols (LAT)

18 September
21:00

Boxscore

Croatia	80–67	Turkey
Scoring by quarter: 17–23, 21–18, 29–5, 13–21
Pts: Vujčić 20; Rebs: Kasun 7 Asts: Planinić, Popović 5		Pts: Peker 23; Rebs: Erdoğan, Peker 4 Asts: Tunçeri 4

Morača Sports Center, Podgorica
Attendance: 3,700
Referees: Eduardo Sancha (ESP), Zoran Sutulovic (MNE), Anibal Castaño (FRA)

=== Group C ===
Team	Pld	W	L	PF	PA	PD	Pts
Slovenia	3	3	0	210	179	+31	6
Greece	3	2	1	187	168	+19	5
France	3	1	2	187	194	−7	4
Bosnia and Herzegovina	3	0	3	177	220	−43	3

16 September
17:30

Boxscore

Slovenia	74–65	Bosnia and Herzegovina
Scoring by quarter: 16–15, 18–19, 20–16, 20–15
Pts: Nachbar 16; Rebs: Brezec 9 Asts: Bečirovič 4		Pts: Domercant, Ovčina 11; Rebs: Ovčina 8 Asts: Mršić 3

Pionir Hall, Belgrade
Attendance: 5,800
Referees: Grzegorz Ziemblicki (POL), Ivo Dolinek (CZE), Borys Ryzhyk (UKR)

16 September
20:30

Boxscore

France	50–64	Greece
Scoring by quarter: 7–21, 7–11, 20–21, 16–11
Pts: Parker 10; Rebs: F. Piétrus 7 Asts: Diaw 3		Pts: Diamantidis 13; Rebs: Diamantidis 9 Asts: Diamantidis 6

Pionir Hall, Belgrade
Attendance: 5,800
Referees: Dubravko Muhvic (CRO), Stelian Banica (ROU), Luigi Lamonica (ITA)

17 September
17:30

Boxscore

Bosnia and Herzegovina	62–79	France
Scoring by quarter: 22–16, 14–15, 11–22, 15–26
Pts: Mršić 24; Rebs: Mršić 8 Asts: Kovačević 4		Pts: Diaw 23; Rebs: Diaw, M. Piétrus 7 Asts: Rigaudeau 7

Pionir Hall, Belgrade
Attendance: 5,500
Referees: Luigi Lamonica (ITA), Grzegorz Ziemblicki (POL), Ivo Dolinek (CZE)

17 September
20:30

Boxscore

Greece	56–68	Slovenia
Scoring by quarter: 14–20, 13–17, 12–17, 17–14
Pts: Papadopoulos 15; Rebs: Kakiouzis 5 Asts: Diamantidis 6		Pts: Bečirovič 18; Rebs: Nesterović 9 Asts: Lakovič 3

Pionir Hall, Belgrade
Attendance: 5,500
Referees: Virginijus Dovidavicius (LTU), Stelian Banica (ROU), Borys Ryzhyk (UKR)

18 September
17:30

Boxscore

Slovenia	68–58	France
Scoring by quarter: 12–15, 18–17, 23–12, 15–14
Pts: Lakovič 18; Rebs: Nesterović 10; Asts: Lakovič, Nachbar 3		Pts: Diaw 16; Rebs: F. Piétrus 9 Asts: Diaw 3

Pionir Hall, Belgrade
Attendance: 5,900
Referees: Virginijus Dovidavicius (LTU), Grzegorz Ziemblicki (POL), Ivo Dolinek (CZE)

18 September
20:30

Boxscore

Greece	67–50	Bosnia and Herzegovina
Scoring by quarter: 15–16, 18–13, 10–12, 24–9
Pts: Fotsis 15; Rebs: Diamantidis 6 Asts: Diamantidis 10		Pts: Hukić 13; Rebs: Domercant, Hukić 6 Asts: Kovačević, Mršić 2

Pionir Hall, Belgrade
Attendance: 5,900
Referees: Luigi Lamonica (ITA), Dubravko Muhvic (CRO), Borys Rhyzhyk (UKR)

=== Group D ===
Team	Pld	W	L	PF	PA	PD	Pts
Spain	3	2	1	280	264	+16	5
Serbia and Montenegro	3	2	1	245	233	+12	5
Israel	3	2	1	236	235	+1	5
Latvia	3	0	3	241	270	−29	3

16 September
17:30

Boxscore

Latvia	65–74	Israel
Scoring by quarter: 18–23, 23–15, 8–18, 16–18
Pts: Štelmahers 19; Rebs: Helmanis 6 Asts: Šķēle, Štelmahers 2		Pts: Hajaj 18; Rebs: Tapiro 10; Asts: Shelef, Tapiro 4

Spens Sports Center, Novi Sad
Attendance: 7,200
Referees: Guerrino Cerebuch (ITA), Mehmet Keseratar (TUR), Oliver Krause (GER)

16 September
20:30

Boxscore

Serbia and Montenegro	70–89	Spain
Scoring by quarter: 13–21, 17–22, 26–27, 14–19
Pts: Rakočević 20; Rebs: Bodiroga 7 Asts: Rakočević 3		Pts: Navarro 27; Rebs: Garbajosa 6 Asts: Calderón, Garbajosa 3

Spens Sports Center, Novi Sad
Attendance: 7,200
Referees: Volodymyr Drabikovskyi (UKR), Petr Sudek (SVK), Vladimir Okhrimenko (RUS)

17 September
17:30

Boxscore

Spain	114–109 (OT)	Latvia
Scoring by quarter: 30–16, 19–30, 25–20, 24–32, Overtime: 16–11
Pts: Navarro 35; Rebs: Reyes 15; Asts: 3 Players 3		Pts: S. Valters 28; Rebs: Cipruss 6 Asts: K. Valters 5

Spens Sports Center, Novi Sad
Attendance: 6,500
Referees: Petr Sudek (SVK), Mehmet Keresatar (TUR), Oliver Krause (GER)

17 September
20:30

Boxscore

Israel	77–93	Serbia and Montenegro
Scoring by quarter: 21–25, 17–22, 27–20, 12–26
Pts: Burstein 20; Rebs: Green 10; Asts: Burstein 6		Pts: Jarić 19; Rebs: Krstić 10; Asts: Rakočević 6

Spens Sports Center, Novi Sad
Attendance: 6,500
Referees: Guerrino Cerebuch (ITA), Volodymyr Drabikovskyi (UKR), Vladimir Tsekov (BUL)

18 September
17:30

Boxscore

Spain	77–85	Israel
Scoring by quarter: 16–17, 12–16, 31–32, 18–20
Pts: Garbajosa 21; Rebs: Garbajosa, Reyes 9 Asts: Navarro 4		Pts: Burstein 19; Rebs: 4 Players 4 Asts: Burstein, Tapiro 5

Spens Sports Center, Novi Sad
Attendance: 6,500
Referees: Volodymyr Drabikovskyi (UKR), Vladimir Okhrimenko (RUS), Vladimir Tsekov (BUL)

18 September
20:30

Boxscore

Latvia	67–82	Serbia and Montenegro
Scoring by quarter: 19–31, 12–16, 19–20, 17–15
Pts: K. Valters 12; Rebs: Helmanis 8 Asts: Štelmahers, K. Valters 2		Pts: Rakočević 19; Rebs: Bodiroga 7 Asts: Jarić 7

Spens Sports Center, Novi Sad
Attendance: 6,500
Referees: Guerrino Cerebuch (ITA), Petr Sudek (SVK), Mehmet Keseratar (TUR)

== Knockout stage ==
=== Championship bracket ===
Play-off; 20 September 2005
Germany	66
Turkey	57
Croatia	74
Italy	66
Greece	67
Israel	61
Serbia and Montenegro	71
France	74

Quarterfinals; 22–23 September 2005
Slovenia	62
Germany	76
Spain (OT)	101
Croatia	85
Russia	61
Greece	66
Lithuania	47
France	63

Semifinals; 24 September 2005
Germany	74
Spain	73
Greece	67
France	66

Final; 25 September 2005
Germany	62
Greece	78
Third place
Spain	68
France	98

==== Play-offs ====
20 September
18:00

Boxscore

Germany	66–57	Turkey
Scoring by quarter: 14–15, 13–19, 21–12, 18–11
Pts: Nowitzki 33; Rebs: Nowitzki 10; Asts: Pesic 5		Pts: Peker 16; Rebs: Türkoğlu 9 Asts: Erdoğan, Tunçeri 3

Millennium Center, Vršac
Attendance: 4,100
Referees: Raúl Chaves (ARG), Milivoje Jovcic (SRB), Oscar Lefwerth (SWE)

20 September
18:00

Boxscore

Croatia	74–66	Italy
Scoring by quarter: 16–19, 24–12, 15–21, 19–14
Pts: Kasun 20; Rebs: Kasun 7 Asts: Popović, Vujčić 4		Pts: Calabria, Chiacig, Pozzecco 14; Rebs: Chiacig 7 Asts: Pozzecco 4

Morača Sports Center, Podgorica
Attendance: 4,100
Referees: Nikolaos Zavlanos (GRE), Sasa Pukl (SLO), Anibal Castaño (FRA)

20 September
20:30

Boxscore

Greece	67–61	Israel
Scoring by quarter: 14–6, 11–8, 24–27, 18–20
Pts: Zisis 23; Rebs: Papadopoulos 10; Asts: Zisis 6		Pts: Green 11; Rebs: Burstein 6 Asts: Burstein 6

Pionir Hall, Belgrade
Attendance: 5,500
Referees: Luigi Lamonica (ITA), Dubravko Muhvic (CRO), Virginijus Dovidavicius (LTU)

20 September
20:30

Boxscore

Serbia and Montenegro	71–74	France
Scoring by quarter: 23–18, 21–17, 13–19, 14–20
Pts: Jarić, Radmanović 14; Rebs: Krstić 6 Asts: Jarić 5		Pts: Rigaudeau 14; Rebs: Julian, Rigaudeau 5 Asts: Diaw, Parker 3

Spens Sports Center, Novi Sad
Attendance: 7,300
Referees: Volodymyr Drabikovskyi (UKR), Petr Sudek (SVK)

==== Quarterfinals ====
22 September
17:30

Boxscore

Russia	61–66	Greece
Scoring by quarter: 13–6, 20–20, 7–18, 21–22
Pts: Kirilenko 20; Rebs: Kirilenko 16; Asts: 3 Players 2		Pts: Papaloukas 23; Rebs: Kakiouzis 11; Asts: Diamantidis 3

Belgrade Arena, Belgrade
Attendance: 15,900
Referees: Eduardo Sancha (ESP), Stelian Banica (ROU), Zoran Sutulovic (MNE)

22 September
20:30

Boxscore

Lithuania	47–63	France
Scoring by quarter: 6–14, 10–18, 20–12, 11–19
Pts: D. Lavrinovič 11; Rebs: Javtokas 8 Asts: Šiškauskas 3		Pts: Diaw 18; Rebs: Diaw, Weis 11; Asts: Parker 5

Belgrade Arena, Belgrade
Attendance: 15,900
Referees: Raúl Chaves (ARG), Oscar Lefwerth (SWE)

23 September
18:00

Boxscore

Slovenia	62–76	Germany
Scoring by quarter: 12–21, 22–13, 13–18, 15–24
Pts: Bečirovič 13; Rebs: Nachbar 8 Asts: Bečirovič 4		Pts: Nowitzki 22; Rebs: Femerling 10; Asts: Demirel 3

Belgrade Arena, Belgrade
Attendance: 17,500
Referees: Lazaros Voreadis (GRE), Milivoje Jovcic (SRB), Anibal Castaño (FRA)

23 September
21:00

Boxscore

Spain	101–85 (OT)	Croatia
Scoring by quarter: 11–18, 14–15, 30–20, 18–20, Overtime: 28–12
Pts: Navarro 36; Rebs: Vázquez 9 Asts: 3 Players 3		Pts: Giriček 17; Rebs: Giriček 8 Asts: Popović 5

Belgrade Arena, Belgrade
Attendance: 17,500
Referees: Luigi Lamonica (ITA), Volodymyr Drabikovskyi (UKR), Virginijus Dovidavicius(LTU)

==== Semifinals ====
24 September
18:00

Boxscore

Greece	67–66	France
Scoring by quarter: 16–14, 13–16, 15–15, 23–21
Pts: Papadopoulos 15; Rebs: Dikoudis 11; Asts: Diamantidis 3		Pts: Parker 20; Rebs: F. Piétrus, Weis 9 Asts: Diaw, Parker 3

Belgrade Arena, Belgrade
Attendance: 17,900
Referees: Milivoje Jovcic (SRB), Borys Ryzhyk (UKR), Dubravko Muhvic (CRO)

24 September
21:00

Boxscore

Germany	74–73	Spain
Scoring by quarter: 16–23, 18–12, 20–22, 20–16
Pts: Nowitzki 27; Rebs: Nowitzki 7 Asts: Demirel 6		Pts: Navarro 27; Rebs: Jiménez 9 Asts: Navarro, Jiménez 2

Belgrade Arena, Belgrade
Attendance: 17,900
Referees: Guerrino Cerebuch (ITA), Oscar Lefwerth (SWE), Petr Sudek (SVK)

==== Third place ====
25 September
18:00

Boxscore

France	98–68	Spain
Scoring by quarter: 21–21, 23–15, 31–18, 23–14
Pts: Parker 25; Rebs: F. Piétrus 8 Asts: Parker 5		Pts: Navarro 17; Rebs: Garbajosa, Reyes 6 Asts: Calderón, Navarro 2

Belgrade Arena, Belgrade
Attendance: 18,900
Referees: Shmuel Bachar (ISR), Zoran Sutulovic (MNE), Nikolaos Zavlanos (GRE)

==== Final ====
25 September
21:00

Boxscore

Greece	78–62	Germany
Scoring by quarter: 19–12, 20–20, 25–16, 14–14
Pts: Papaloukas 22; Rebs: Diamantidis 5 Asts: Papaloukas 6		Pts: Nowitzki 23; Rebs: Nowitzki 9 Asts: Demirel 3

Belgrade Arena, Belgrade
Attendance: 18,900
Referees: Luigi Lamonica (ITA), Dubravko Muhvic (CRO), Raúl Chaves (ARG)

=== 5th to 8th place ===
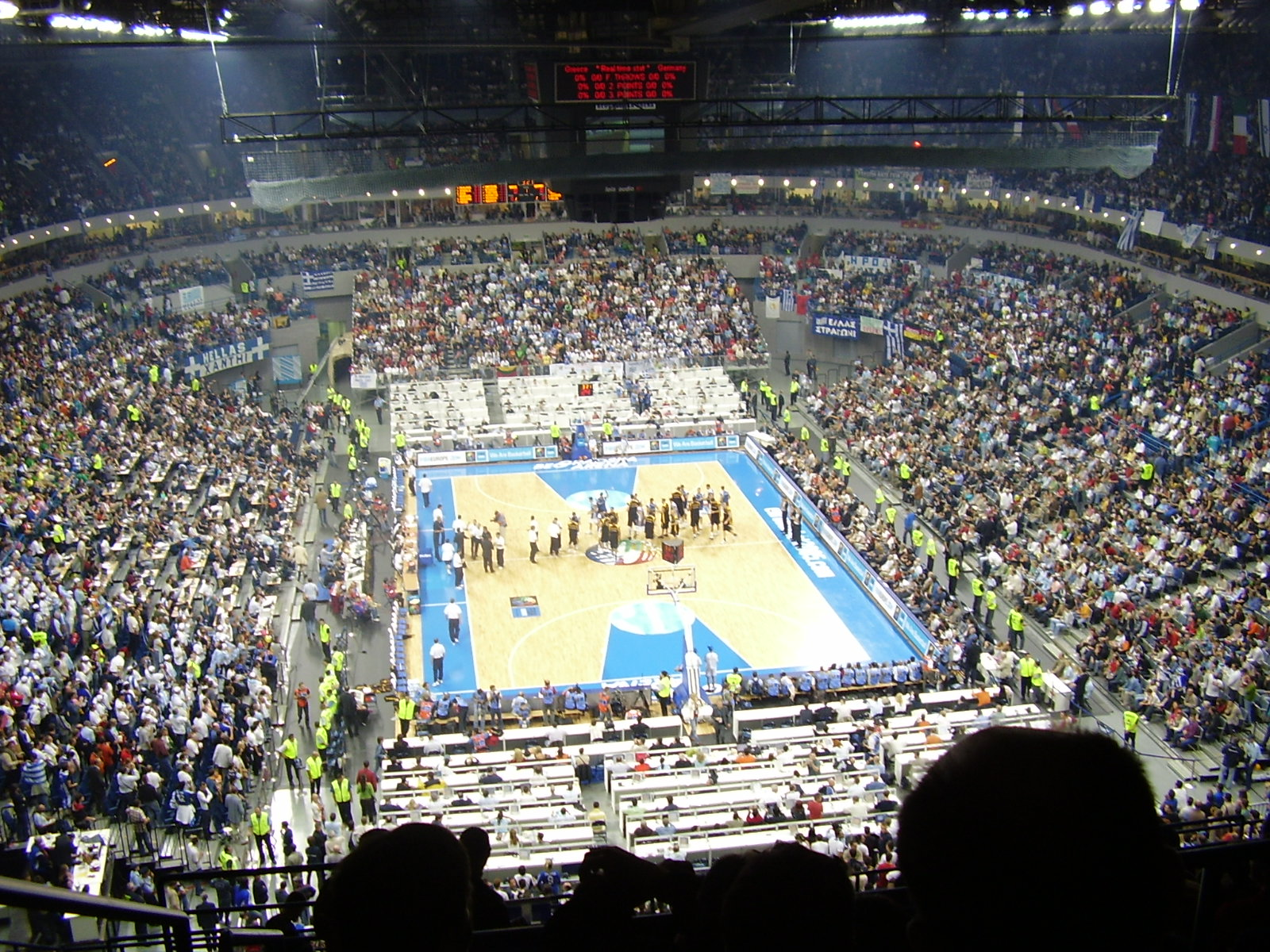
View of Belgrade Arena from the upper bowl before the start of the Greece vs. Germany final.

Classification round
23 September – 15:30
Russia	78
Lithuania	89
24 September – 15:30
Slovenia	89
Croatia	80

Fifth place
25 September – 14:15
Lithuania	79
Slovenia	70
Seventh place
25 September – 12:00
Russia	74
Croatia	92

23 September
15:30

Boxscore

Russia	78–89	Lithuania
Scoring by quarter: 21–23, 23–15, 16–21, 18–30
Pts: Pashutin 27; Rebs: Savrasenko 10; Asts: Holden 3		Pts: Jankūnas 19; Rebs: Javtokas, Žukauskas 5 Asts: Šiškauskas, Žukauskas 4

Belgrade Arena, Belgrade
Attendance: 4,000
Referees: Petr Sudek (SVK), Shmuel Bachar (ISR), Mehmet Keseratar (TUR)

24 September
15:30

Boxscore

Slovenia	89–80	Croatia
Scoring by quarter: 19–27, 21–16, 18–8, 31–29
Pts: Lakovič 20; Rebs: Nesterović 10; Asts: Lakovič 5		Pts: Bagarić, Giriček 13; Rebs: Bagarić, Giriček 8 Asts: Popović 4

Belgrade Arena, Belgrade
Attendance: 7,000
Referees: Shmuel Bachar (ISR), Grzegorz Ziemblicki (POL), Nikolaos Zavlanos (GRE)

25 September
12:00

Boxscore

Russia	74–92	Croatia
Scoring by quarter: 19–25, 22–17, 12–33, 21–17
Pts: Fridzon, Likholitov 14; Rebs: Khryapa 10; Asts: Ponkrashov 9		Pts: Rančić, Tomas 22; Rebs: Bagarić, Žižić 10; Asts: Ukić 7

Belgrade Arena, Belgrade
Attendance: 4,800
Referees: Guerrino Cerebuch (ITA), Stelian Banica (ROU), Sasa Pukl (SLO)

25 September
14:15

Boxscore

Lithuania	79–70	Slovenia
Scoring by quarter: 27–19, 18–17, 15–26, 19–18
Pts: Javtokas 22; Rebs: K. Lavrinovič 9 Asts: Lukauskis 7		Pts: Nachbar, Slokar 12; Rebs: Brezec 7 Asts: Bečirovič, Lakovič 3

Belgrade Arena, Belgrade
Attendance: 4,800
Referees: Ivo Dolinek (CZE), Seffi Shemmesh (ISR), Lazaros Voreadis (GRE)

== Statistical leaders ==
=== Individual Tournament Highs ===
Points

Pos.	Name	PPG
1	(Germany) Dirk Nowitzki	26.1
2	(Spain) Juan Carlos Navarro	25.2
3	(Russia) Andrei Kirilenko	17.5
4	(Serbia and Montenegro) Igor Rakočević	16.3
5	(Croatia) Gordan Giriček	15.7
6	(Spain) Jorge Garbajosa	14.5
7	(Lithuania) Ramūnas Šiškauskas	14.0
8	(France) Boris Diaw	13.7
9	(Slovenia) Jaka Lakovič	12.8
10	(Russia) Jon Robert Holden	12.5

Rebounds

Pos.	Name	RPG
1	(Russia) Andrei Kirilenko	11.8
2	(Germany) Dirk Nowitzki	10.6
2	(Russia) Victor Khryapa	8.7
4	(Spain) Felipe Reyes	7.7
5	(France) Florent Piétrus	7.1
6	(Croatia) Gordan Giriček	6.5
7	(Spain) Jorge Garbajosa	6.2
7	(Slovenia) Radoslav Nesterović	6.2
9	(Croatia) Mario Kasun	6.0
10	(France) Frédéric Weis	5.9

Assists

Pos.	Name	APG
1	(Greece) Dimitris Diamantidis	5.0
2	(Serbia and Montenegro) Marko Jarić	4.3
3	(Israel) Tal Burstein	4.0
3	(Serbia and Montenegro) Igor Rakočević	4.0
3	(Israel) Meir Tapiro	4.0
6	(Croatia) Marko Popović	3.5
7	(France) Boris Diaw	3.4
8	(Turkey) Kerem Tunçeri	3.0
9	(France) Tony Parker	2.4
10	(Slovenia) Jaka Lakovič	2.3
10	(Lithuania) Ramūnas Šiškauskas	2.3

Steals

Pos.	Name	SPG
1	(Russia) Andrei Kirilenko	3.3
2	(Israel) Dror Hajaj	3.0
2	(Israel) Meir Tapiro	3.0
4	(Greece) Dimitris Diamantidis	2.9
5	(Slovenia) Sani Bečirovič	2.3
5	(Turkey) Ender Arslan	2.3
7	(Lithuania) Vidas Ginevičius	2.2
7	(Croatia) Zoran Planinić	2.2
9	(Serbia and Montenegro) Marko Jarić	2.0
9	(Turkey) Kerem Tunçeri	2.0

Blocks

Pos.	Name	BPG
1	(Russia) Andrei Kirilenko	2.8
2	(Germany) Dirk Nowitzki	1.9
3	(France) Boris Diaw	1.3
4	(Serbia and Montenegro) Darko Miličić	1.2
4	(Lithuania) Darjuš Lavrinovič	1.2
4	(Spain) Fran Vázquez	1.2
7	(Slovenia) Radoslav Nesterović	1.0
7	(Croatia) Mario Kasun	1.0
7	(Israel) Yaniv Green	1.0
7	(Italy) Denis Marconato	1.0
7	(Turkey) Mehmet Okur	1.0

Minutes

Pos.	Name	MPG
1	(Germany) Dirk Nowitzki	36.9
2	(Spain) Jorge Garbajosa	35.3
3	(Croatia) Gordan Giriček	34.7
4	(Israel) Tal Burstein	34.5
5	(Spain) Juan Carlos Navarro	33.5
5	(Russia) Andrei Kirilenko	33.5
7	(Spain) José Calderón	31.7
8	(Slovenia) Jaka Lakovič	31.5
9	(Greece) Dimitris Diamantidis	31.4
10	(France) Boris Diaw	31.3
10	(Israel) Meir Tapiro	31.3

=== Individual Game Highs ===
Department	Name	Total	Opponent
Points	(Spain) Juan Carlos Navarro	36	Croatia
Rebounds	(Germany) Dirk Nowitzki	19	Russia
Assists	(Greece) Dimitris Diamantidis	10	Bosnia and Herzegovina
Steals	(Russia) Andrei Kirilenko	5	Germany
Blocks	(Russia) Andrei Kirilenko	5	Ukraine
Turnovers	(Israel) Tal Burstein	8	Greece

=== Team Tournament Highs ===
Offensive PPG

Pos.	Name	PPG
1	Spain	87.0
2	Bulgaria	84.0
3	Croatia	80.9
4	Latvia	80.3
5	Lithuania	79.8

Rebounds

Pos.	Name	RPG
1	Russia	41.3
2	France	40.9
3	Slovenia	40.8
4	Latvia	36.7
5	Spain	35.5

Assists

Pos.	Name	APG
1	Israel	14.3
2	Lithuania	14.0
3	Italy	13.8
4	Croatia	13.4
5	Serbia and Montenegro	12.3

Steals

Pos.	Name	SPG
1	Turkey	13.3
2	Israel	11.8
3	Bulgaria	11.3
4	Lithuania	10.3
4	Latvia	10.3

Blocks

Pos.	Name	BPG
1	Latvia	4.0
2	France	3.9
3	Russia	3.8
3	Lithuania	3.5
5	Germany	2.9

=== Team Game highs ===
Department	Name	Total	Opponent
Points	Spain	114	Latvia
Rebounds	France	48	Bosnia and Herzegovina
Assists	Lithuania	23	Russia
Steals	Lithuania	19	Bulgaria
Blocks	Latvia	8	Israel
Field goal percentage	Lithuania	62.7% (37/59)	Russia
3-point field goal percentage	Italy	51.7% (15/29)	Ukraine
Free throw percentage	Germany	95% (19/20)	Greece
Turnovers	Croatia; Turkey	27	Turkey; Croatia

== Awards ==
2005 FIBA EuroBasket champions

Greece
2nd title

2005 FIBA EuroBasket MVP: Dirk Nowitzki ( Germany)

All-Tournament Team
(Greece) Theodoros Papaloukas
(Spain) Juan Carlos Navarro
(Greece) Dimitris Diamantidis
(Germany) Dirk Nowitzki (MVP)
(France) Boris Diaw

== Final standings ==
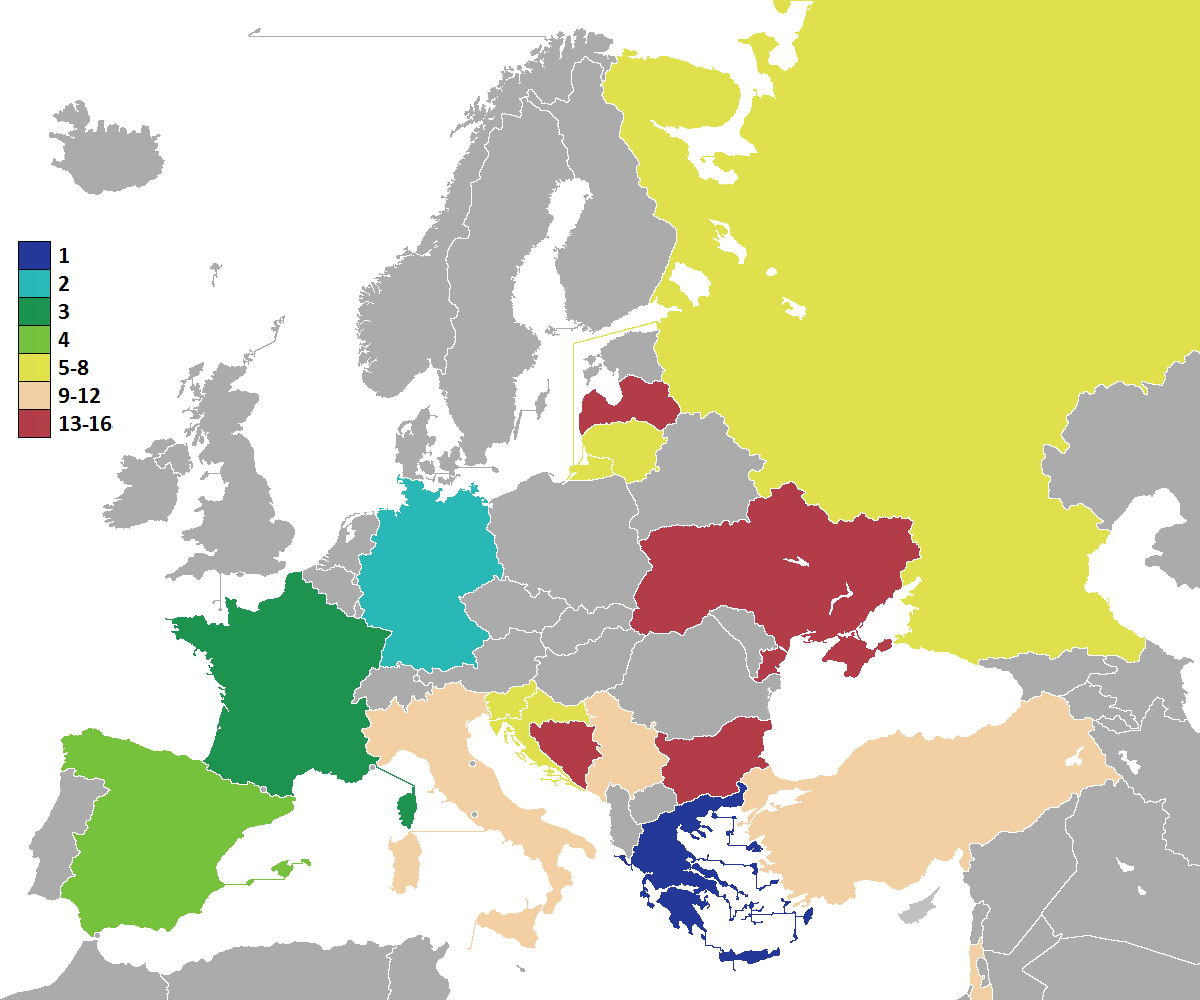
Results

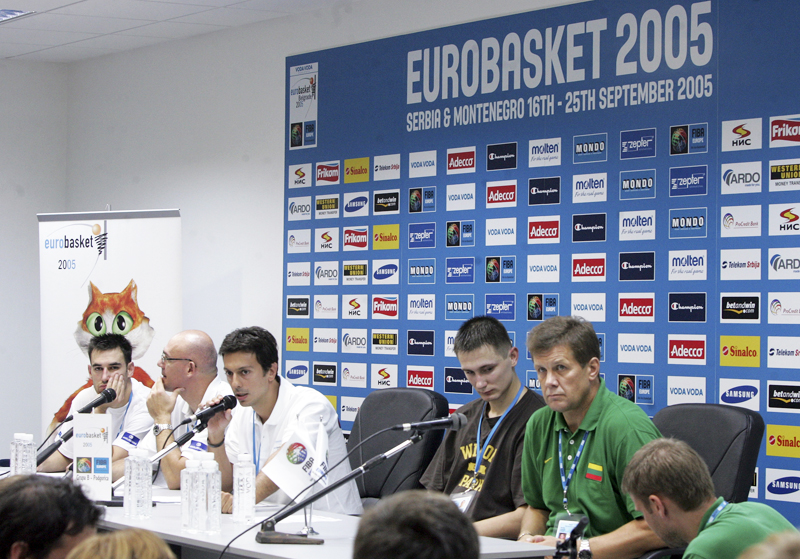
Lithuania and Croatia in press conference

Qualified for the 2006 FIBA World Championship
Qualified for the 2006 FIBA World Championship as wild cards

Rank	Team	Record
1st place, gold medalist(s)	Greece	6–1
2nd place, silver medalist(s)	Germany	5–2
3rd place, bronze medalist(s)	France	4–3
4	Spain	3–3
5	Lithuania	5–1
6	Slovenia	4–2
7	Croatia	4–3
8	Russia	2–4
9	Israel	2–2
9	Italy	2–2
9	Serbia and Montenegro	2–2
9	Turkey	1–3
13	Bosnia and Herzegovina	0–3
13	Bulgaria	0–3
13	Latvia	0–3
13	Ukraine	0–3

1st	2nd	3rd	4th
Greece Theodoros Papaloukas; Vassilis Spanoulis; Nikolaos Zisis; Ioannis Bourousis; Panagiotis Vasilopoulos; Antonis Fotsis; Nikos Chatzivrettas; Dimos Dikoudis; Kostas Tsartsaris; Dimitris Diamantidis; Lazaros Papadopoulos; Michalis Kakiouzis	Germany Mithat Demirel; Robert Garrett; Demond Greene; Marko Pešić; Denis Wucherer; Pascal Roller; Misan Haldin; Sven Schultze; Stephen Arigbabu; Patrick Femerling; Dirk Nowitzki; Robert Maras	France Frédéric Fauthoux; Mickaël Gelabale; Antoine Rigaudeau; Cyril Julian; Mickaël Piétrus; Tony Parker; Mamoutou Diarra; Florent Piétrus; Jérôme Schmitt; Boris Diaw; Frédéric Weis; Sacha Giffa	Spain Rudy Fernández; Iker Iturbe; Carlos Cabezas; Juan Carlos Navarro; José Calderón; Felipe Reyes; Carlos Jiménez; Sergi Vidal; Sergio Rodríguez; Iñaki de Miguel; Fran Vázquez; Jorge Garbajosa
