= Marko Maravič =

Slovenian basketball player and coach

Personal information
- Born: 26 June 1979 (age 47) Ljubljana, SR Slovenia, SFR Yugoslavia
- Listed height: 2.02 m (6 ft 8 in)

Career information
- NBA draft: 2001: undrafted
- Playing career: 1996–2012
- Position: Assistant coach
- Coaching career: 2015–present

Career history

Playing
- 1996–2001: Slovan
- 2001–2002: Royal BC Pepinster
- 2002–2003: Krka
- 2003–2004: Union Olimpija
- 2004–2005: AJ Milano
- 2005–2006: Ricoh Manresa
- 2006–2007: Vive Menorca
- 2007–2008: BC Kyiv
- 2009: Union Olimpija
- 2009–2012: Pau-Orthez

Coaching
- –2016: ŠD Šentvid-Ljubljana (youth)
- 2016–2017: KOŠ Koper (youth)
- 2017–2019: KK Ljubljana
- 2019–2020: Cedevita Olimpija (assistant)

Marko Maravič (born 26 June 1979) is a Slovenian professional basketball coach and former player. He currently serves as an assistant coach for Cedevita Olimpija of the Slovenian League, ABA League and the EuroCup.

== Playing career ==
Maravic has played with Slovan (Slo), Royal BC Pepinster (Bel), Krka (Slo), Union Olimpija (Slo), AJ Milano (Ita), Manresa (Spa), Vive Menorca (Spa) BC Kyiv (Ukr) and Pau Lach Orthez (fra)

== National team career ==
Maravič was a member of the Slovenia national basketball team at the 2005 FIBA European Championship.
