= Ardo Ärmpalu =

Estonian basketball player

Ardo Ärmpalu (born 26 December 1980) is an Estonian basketball player.

He was born in Rapla. In 2004 he graduated from Marshall University in the United States.

He began his basketball career at the age of 11. He has played Kalev/Cramo club (1998 and 2006 Estonian champion). 2001–2005 he was a member of Estonia men's national basketball team.
