= Djoenie Steenvoorde =

Dutch basketball player (born 1981)

Djoenie Steenvoorde (born 1 May 1981, Seoul) is a Dutch basketball player who played for Dutch league eredivisie clubs Omniworld Almere, Rotterdam Challengers and Eiffel Towers Den Bosch during the 2003–2012 seasons.
