= Robert Skibniewski =

Polish basketball player (born 1983)

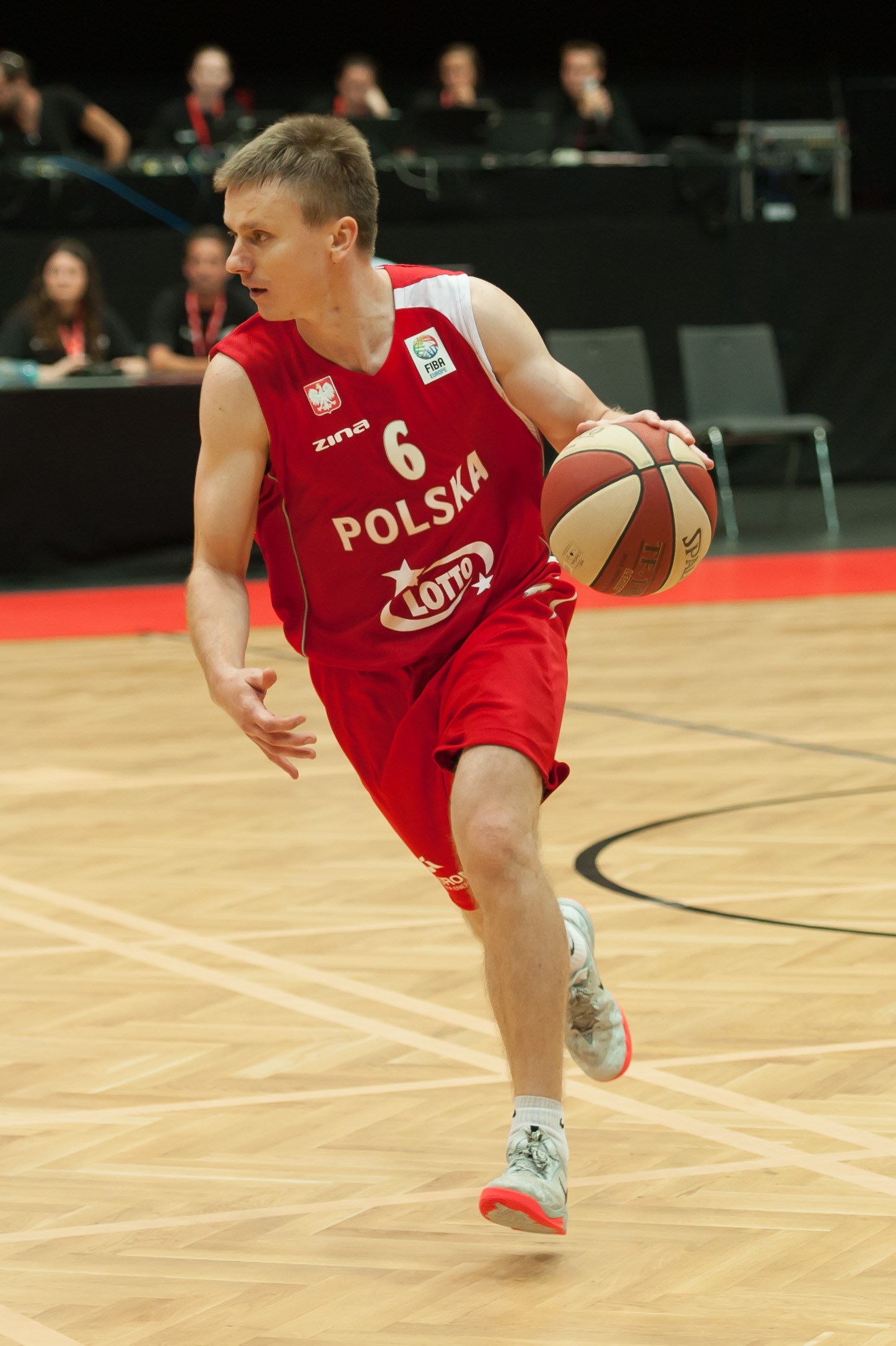

No. 6 – GTK Gliwice
- Position: Point guard
- League: PLK

Personal information
- Born: 19 July 1983 (age 43) Bielawa, Poland
- Listed height: 6 ft 0 in (1.83 m)

Career history
- 1996–1999: Luz Bielawa
- 1999–2006: Śląsk Wrocław
- 2006–2007: Polpak Świecie
- 2007–2008: Turów Zgorzelec
- 2008: Śląsk Wrocław
- 2008–2010: BK Prostějov
- 2010: Anwil Włocławek
- 2010–2011: Polpharma Starogard Gdański
- 2011–2012: Anwil Włocławek
- 2012: AZS Koszalin
- 2012–2013: Inter Bratislava
- 2013–2015: Śląsk Wrocław
- 2015–2016: Anwil Włocławek
- 2016–2017: Wilki Morskie Szczecin
- 2017–present: GTK Gliwice

Career highlights
- Polish League champion (2002); 2× Polish Cup winner (2011, 2014); Polish Cup MVP (2011); Slovak League champion (2013)

Robert Skibniewski (born 19 July 1983) is a Polish professional basketball player for GTK Gliwice of the Polish League. He is a 182 cm (6 ft 0 in) tall point guard.

== Professional career ==
Skibniewski was the Polish Cup MVP, in 2011.

== National team career ==
Skibniewski played with the senior Polish national team at the 2007 EuroBasket, the 2009 EuroBasket, and the 2011 EuroBasket. He also made the squad for the 2015 EuroBasket, replacing Dardan Berisha.
