= Mārtiņš Skirmants =

Latvian basketball player (born 1977)

retired
- Position: Center

Personal information
- Born: December 7, 1977 (age 47); Rīga, Latvia

Career information
- Playing career: 1996–2014

Mārtiņš Skirmants (born December 7, 1977, in Rīga, Latvia) is a former Latvian professional basketball player who played the center position.

== Playing career ==
Mārtiņš Skirmants started playing basketball in Daugavpils, but later on he moved to Rīga, where he started his pro career.

Skirmants spent most of his career playing for LBL clubs. He won seven LBL championships: one with Brocēni (1998), five with BK Ventspils (2002-2006) and one with Barons (2010). Skirmants excelled at shot blocking, which was his strength on defense.

He was part of Latvian National Team at EuroBasket 2005.

== Pro clubs ==
- 1997-01: ASK/Brocēni/LMT
- 2001-06: BK Ventspils
- 2006-07: Barons LMT
- 2007-09: BK Ventspils
- 2009-10: BC Goverla
- 2010-11: Barons LMT
