= Michał Ignerski =

Polish basketball player (born 1980)

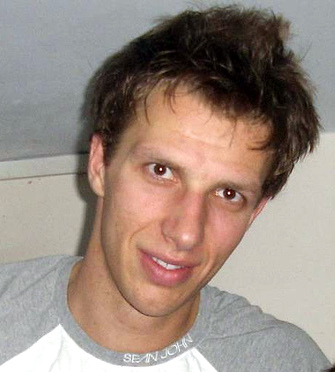
- Ignerski, in 2007.

Personal information
- Born: August 13, 1980 (age 46) Lublin, Poland
- Listed height: 6 ft 10 in (2.08 m)
- Listed weight: 225 lb (102 kg)

Career information
- College: Bacone (1999–2000); Eastern Oklahoma State (2000–2001); Mississippi State (2001–2003)
- NBA draft: 2003: undrafted
- Playing career: 1997–2022
- Position: Power forward

Career history
- 1997–1998: AZS Lublin
- 1998–1999: SMS Warka
- 2003–2005: Śląsk Wrocław
- 2005–2006: Anwil Włocławek
- 2006–2009: Sevilla
- 2009–2010: Lagun Aro GBC
- 2010–2011: Beşiktaş Cola Turka
- 2011–2012: Nizhny Novgorod
- 2012: Lokomotiv Kuban
- 2012–2013: Dinamo Sassari
- 2013: Virtus Roma
- 2014: Krasnye Krylya
- 2014–2015: Le Mans
- 2016: Pallacanestro Cantù
- 2019: KS Basket Nysa
- 2019: Anwil Włocławek
- 2021-2022: KS Basket Nysa

Career highlights
- 2× Polish Cup winner (2004, 2005); Polish Cup MVP (2005)

Michał Jakub Ignerski (born August 13, 1980) is a Polish former professional basketball player.

== Professional career ==
Ignerski was the Polish Cup MVP in 2005. He finished his pro career with Pallacanestro Cantù, in Italy.

== National team career ==
As a member of the senior Polish national basketball team, Ignerski played at the 2011 EuroBasket, and the 2013 EuroBasket.
