= Iker Iturbe =

Spanish basketball player

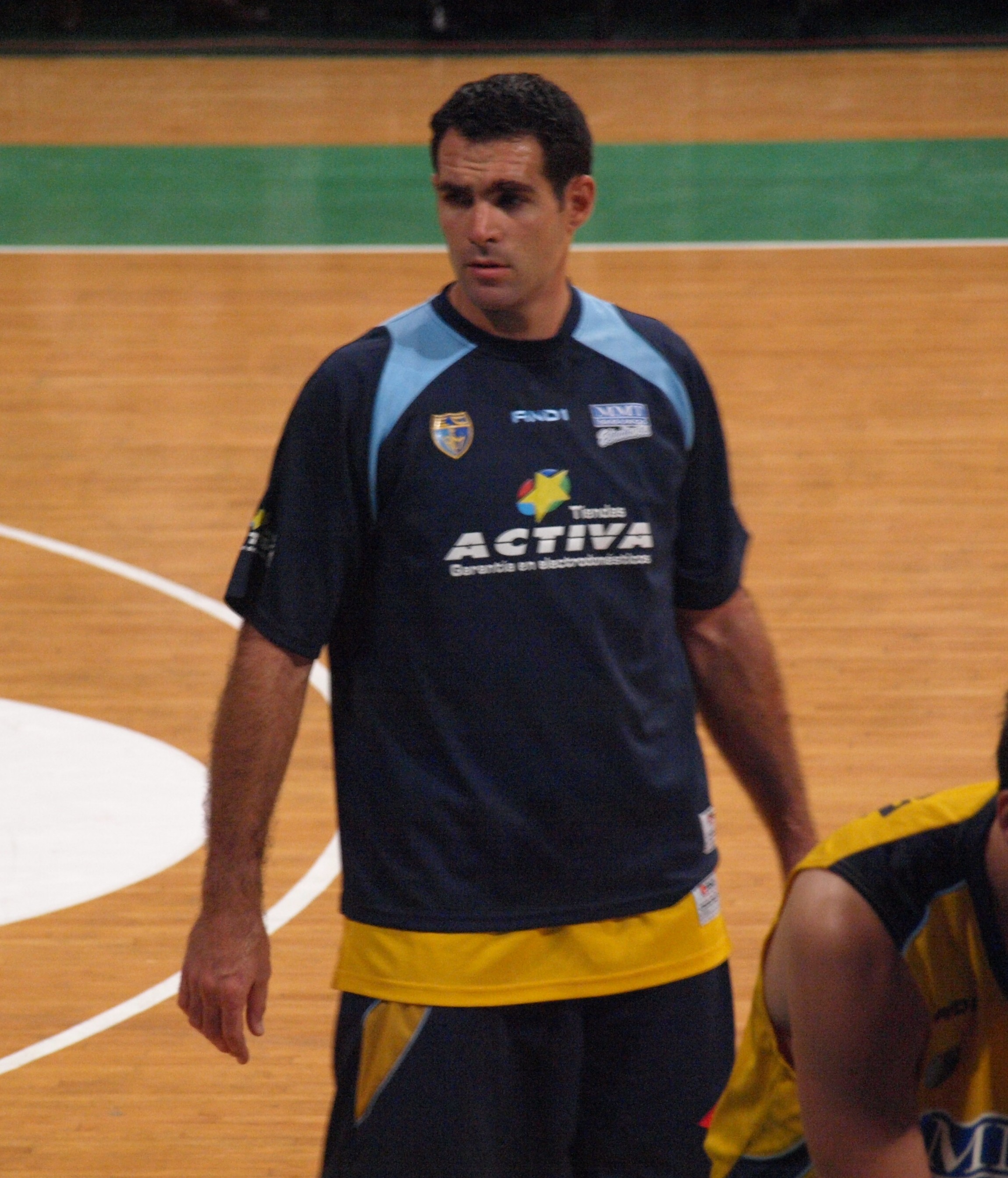

Personal information
- Born: 10 July 1976 (age 50) Vitoria, Spain
- Listed height: 1.98 m (6 ft 6 in)
- Listed weight: 101 kg (223 lb)

Career information
- High school: Totino-Grace (Fridley, Minnesota)
- College: Clemson (1994–1998)
- NBA draft: 1998: undrafted
- Playing career: 1998–2010
- Position: Small forward / power forward

Career history
- 1998–2002: Real Madrid C.F.
- 2002–2007: Estudiantes
- 2007–2008: UPIM Bologna
- 2008: Real Madrid C.F.
- 2008–2010: Estudiantes
Medals
Men's basketball
Representing Spain
FIBA Europe Under-18 Championship
Bronze medal – third place	1994 Israel	U-18 Team

Iker Iturbe (born 10 July 1976) is a Clemson Alumni men’s basketball player and is a retired Spanish professional basketball player. He has played in Spain and Italy at club level and for the Spain national team. He became ACB champion in the 1999–2000 season.

Iturbe has represented Spain at EuroBasket 2005 and 2004 Summer Olympics.
