= Frédéric Fauthoux =

French basketball coach and former player

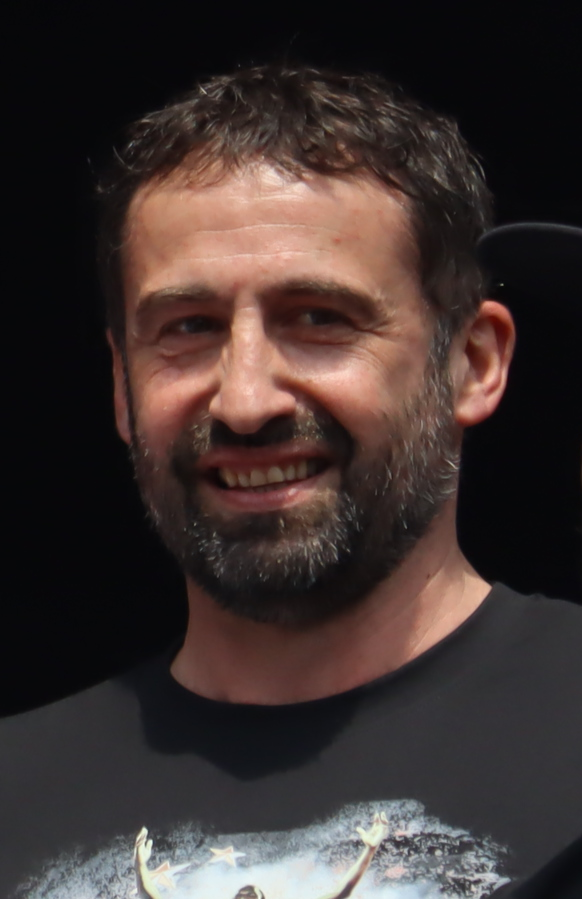
- Fauthoux in 2026

JL Bourg
- Title: Head coach
- League: LNB Élite; EuroCup

Personal information
- Born: 6 December 1972 (age 53) Saint-Sever, Landes, France
- Listed height: 1.80 m (5 ft 11 in)

Career information
- Playing career: 1990–2007
- Position: Point guard
- Number: 4
- Coaching career: 2007–present

Career history

Playing
- 1990–2007: Élan Béarnais Pau-Orthez

Coaching
- 2007–2015: Pau-Orthez (youth/reserve)
- 2015–2020: Levallois Metropolitans
- 2020–2022: ASVEL (assistant)
- 2022–present: JL Bourg
- 2024–present: France

Career highlights
- As player: 7× French League champion (1992, 1996, 1998, 1999, 2001, 2003, 2004); 3× French Cup winner (2002, 2003, 2007); 4× French Leaders Cup winner (1991–1993, 2003); LNB All-Star Game Three-Point Contest champion (2005); As head coach: EuroCup champion (2026); As assistant coach: French League champion (2021, 2022); French Cup winner (2021)
Medals
Men's basketball
Representing France
EuroBasket
Bronze medal – third place	2005 Serbia and Montenegro

Frédéric Fauthoux (born 6 December 1972) is a French professional basketball coach and former point guard. He is the head coach of JL Bourg Basket in LNB Élite and, since September 2024, the head coach of the French national team.

== Playing career ==
A one-club man, Fauthoux played for Élan Béarnais Pau-Orthez during his entire professional career (1990–2007), winning multiple French Cups and LNB Pro A titles. He earned over 40 caps for the France men's national basketball team, including a bronze medal at EuroBasket 2005.

== Coaching career ==
After retiring, Fauthoux started his coaching journey in the Pau-Orthez youth system. He later took charge of Levallois Metropolitans (2015–2020), before becoming assistant coach at ASVEL Basket, where he was part of back-to-back French League titles in 2021 and 2022.

In 2022, he became head coach of JL Bourg Basket. Under his leadership, Bourg reached the EuroCup Finals in 2024, elevated their presence in European tournaments, and solidified their position among top French clubs.

== National team coaching career ==
On 25 September 2024, Fauthoux was named head coach of the senior French national team, succeeding long-serving Vincent Collet. He led the team into its EuroBasket 2025 qualifying campaign, backed by a coaching staff of Laurent Vila, Bryan George, Joseph Gomis, Pascal Donnadieu, and Maxime Chiron.

== Coaching philosophy ==
Fauthoux embraces a collective approach. After a recent victory, he praised his team's unity:

> “Nous gagnons grâce au collectif.”

L'Équipe and players have also highlighted his leadership style as grounded, honest, and empathetic.

== Personal life ==
He is the father of Marine Fauthoux, a professional women's basketball player and French national team guard.
