= Mamoutou Diarra =

French professional basketball player

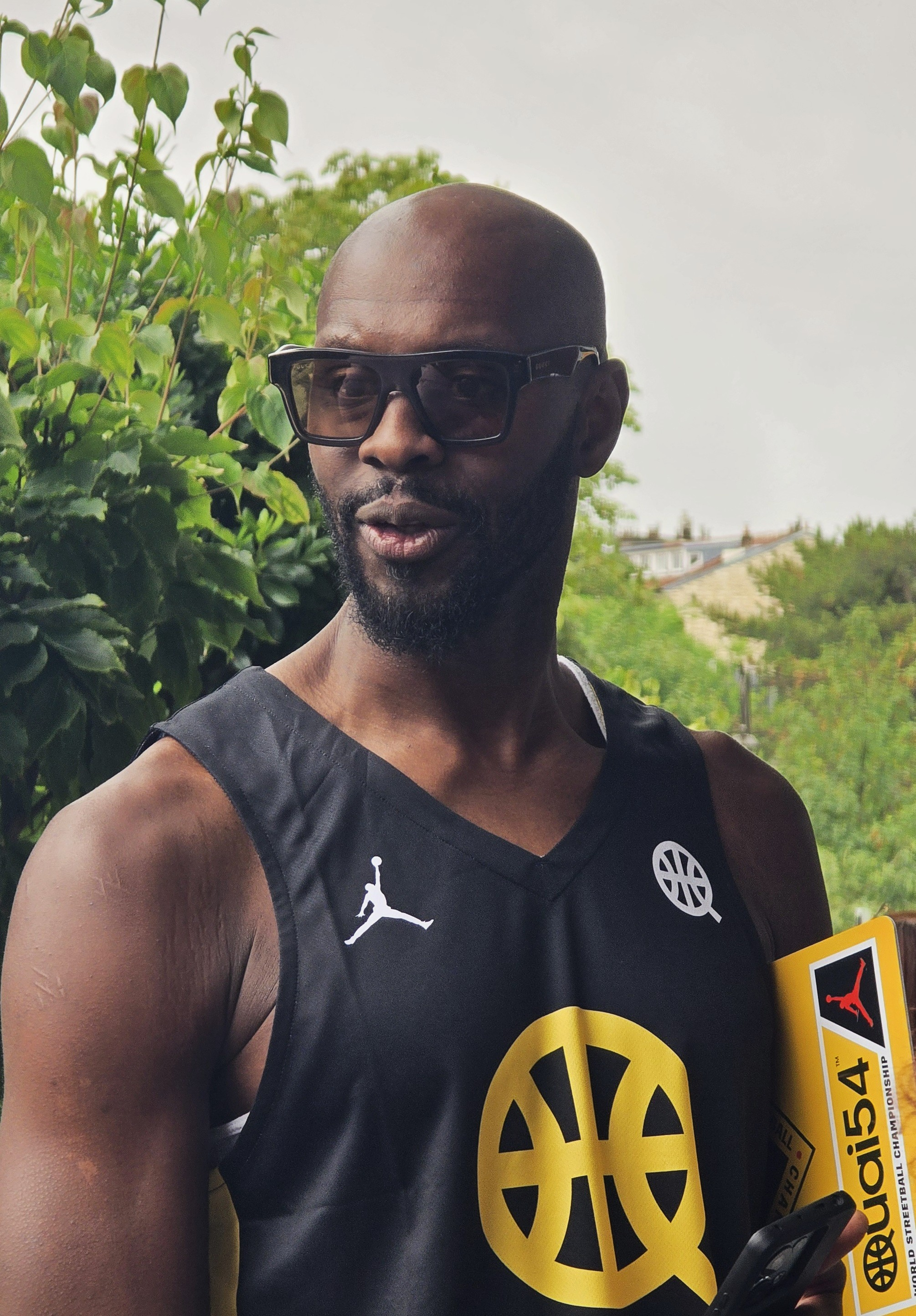
- Mamoutou Diarra at Quai 54 in 2025

Personal information
- Born: 21 May 1980 (age 46) Paris, France
- Listed height: 2.00 m (6 ft 7 in)
- Listed weight: 100 kg (220 lb)

Career information
- College: INSEP (1997–1999)
- NBA draft: 2002: undrafted
- Playing career: 1999–2016
- Position: Small forward
- Number: 7, 8, 10, 18

Career history
- 1999–2000: AS Bondy 93
- 2000–2005: Paris Racing Basket
- 2005–2007: Élan Chalon
- 2007–2009: PAOK
- 2009: Air Avellino
- 2010: Chorale Roanne
- 2010–2011: Cholet Basket
- 2011–2013: JSF Nanterre
- 2014: Orléans Loiret Basket
- 2014–2016: Olympique Antibes

Mamoutou Diarra (born 21 May 1980) is a French-Malian former professional basketball player. He played as a small forward, spending the majority of his career in the French league.

== Professional career ==
Diarra began his professional career with AS Bondy 93 of the French Second Division in 1999. He then moved to the French First Division club Paris Racing Basket, where he played from 2000 to 2005. He then moved to Chalon, where he played from 2005 to 2007.

He played with the Greek League club PAOK from 2007 to 2009. He then joined the Italian League club Air Avellino, before moving to the French League club Chorale Roanne. In 2010, he moved to the Greek League club Maroussi., but due to the economic problems of the Greek club he returned to French Pro A signing a one-year contract with Cholet. In March 2014, he signed with Orléans Loiret Basket.

In June 2014, he signed with Olympique Antibes of the LNB Pro B. After two seasons, he left Antibes.

== National team career ==
As a member of the senior men's French national basketball team, Diarra won the bronze medal at EuroBasket 2005, and he also played at the 2006 FIBA World Championship.

== Personal life ==
Diarra is the brother of the rapper Oxmo Puccino.
