= Sharon Shason =

Israeli basketball player (born 1979)

Sharon Sasson שרון ששון
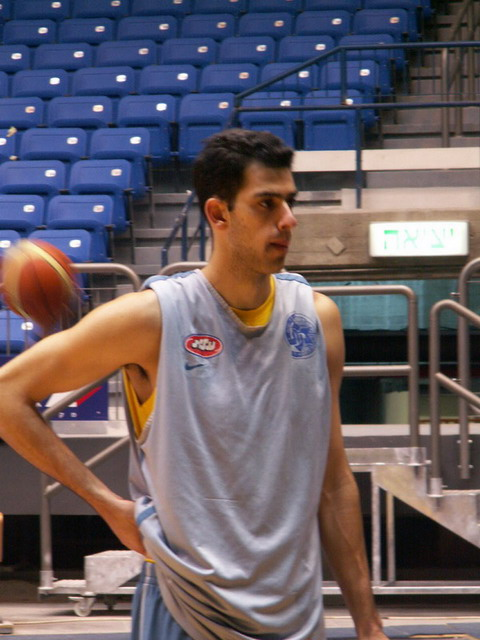

Personal information
- Listed height: 6 ft 9 in (2.06 m)
- Position: Forward

Sharon Sasson (Hebrew: שרון ששון; born March 16, 1979) is a retired Israeli basketball player. A 6-foot-9-inch (206 cm) forward, he last played for Bnei HaSharon.

Sasson signed with Hapoel Jerusalem in August 2007. He had spent the last two seasons with Maccabi Tel Aviv, who released him from the final year of a three-year contract after he averaged just 3.2 points per game in 44 Euroleague games. Shason averaged 10.7 points per game with Hapoel Jerusalem during the 2007–08 season, with a high of 35 points against Ironi Ashkelon.

On 31 August 2011 he retired from the game. He scored 2,036 points in 240 games in the Israeli Basketball Super League, and represented the Israeli national basketball team scoring 318 points in 56 games.

== Honours ==
- Israeli Basketball Super League:
  - Winner (2): 2006, 2007
- Israeli Basketball State Cup:
  - Winner (2): 2006, 2008
- Euroleague:
  - Runner-up (1): 2006
