= Mithat Demirel =

German basketball player (born 1978)

Personal information
- Born: 10 May 1978 (age 48) West Berlin, West Germany
- Listed height: 1.81 m (5 ft 11 in)

Career information
- Playing career: 1997–2009
- Position: Point guard

Career history
- 1997–1999: Alba Berlin
- 1999–2000: Oyak Renault
- 2000–2001: Mitteldeutscher
- 2001–2005: Alba Berlin
- 2005–2006: Beşiktaş
- 2006–2007: Galatasaray
- 2007: Scafati Basket
- 2008: Brose Baskets
- 2008–2009: Erdemirspor
Medals
Men's basketball
Representing Germany
FIBA World Cup
Bronze medal – third place	2002 USA	Germany
EuroBasket
Silver medal – second place	2005 Serbia & Montenegro	Germany

Mithat Demirel (born 10 May 1978) is a German former professional basketball player of Turkish descent. He played for Erdemir SK of the Turkish Premier Basketball League before retiring. Formerly a member of Scafati Basket in Italy, Demirel also represented Germany internationally. He retired in 2010 due to an injury to his right eye he had sustained in 2008.
