= Todor Stoykov =

Bulgarian basketball player

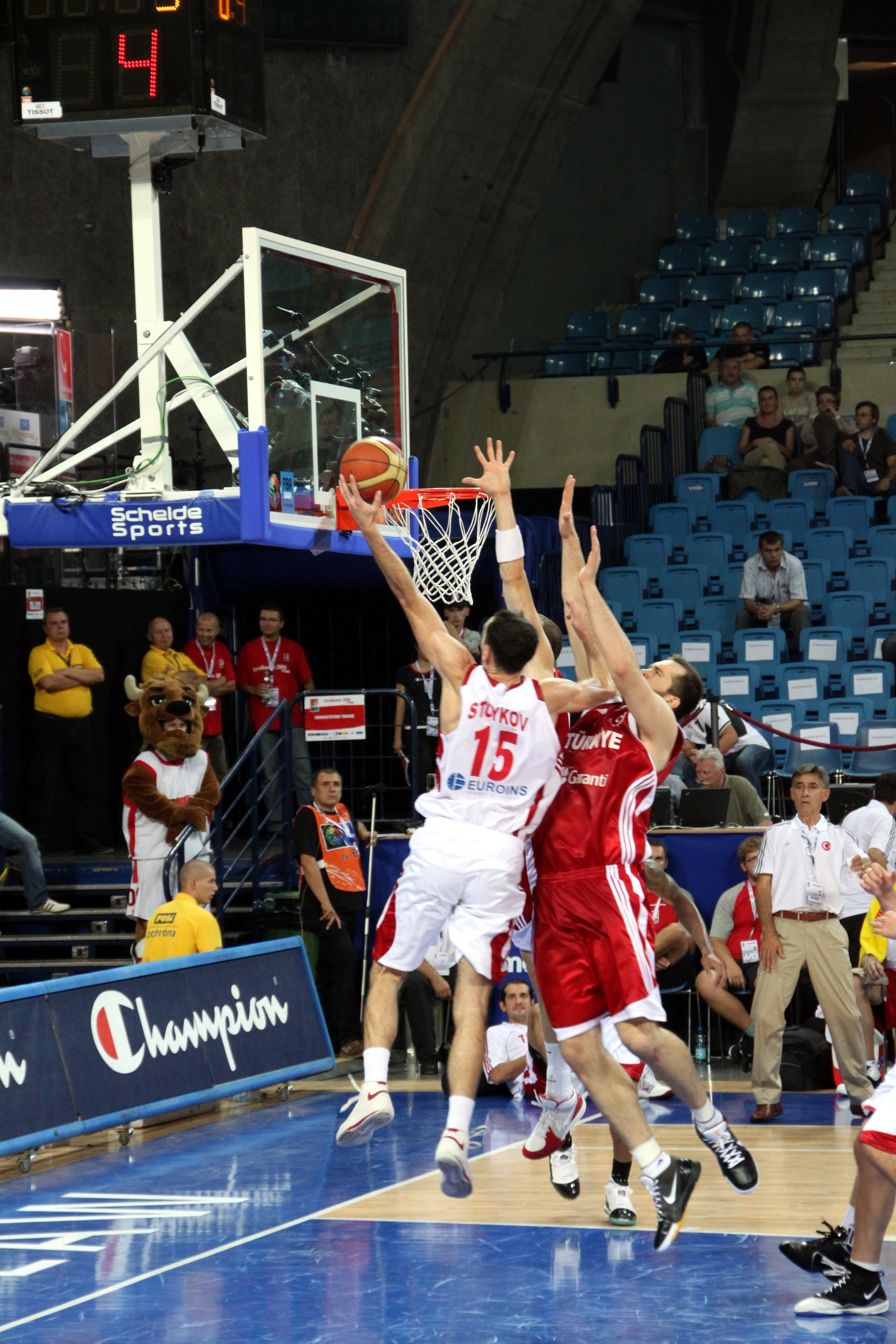
- Stoykov (№15) in action

Personal information
- Born: 3 March 1977 (age 49) Varna, Bulgaria
- Listed height: 1.98 m (6 ft 6 in)
- Listed weight: 97 kg (214 lb)

Career information
- Playing career: 1995–2013
- Position: Shooting guard / small forward

Career history
- 1995–2000: Cherno More
- 2000: Cordivari Roseto
- 2001: Scafati Basket
- 2001: Cherno More
- 2001–2005: Lukoil Academic
- 2006: Valencia BC
- 2006–2013: Lukoil Academic

Career highlights
- EuroCup Top Scorer (2005)

Todor Stoykov (born 3 March 1977 in Varna) is a Bulgarian retired professional basketball player, who played for Cherno More, Cordivari Roseto, Scafati Basket, Valencia BC and Lukoil Academic. At 1.98 m, his position was shooting guard/small forward. He was also a member of the Bulgarian national basketball team, before retiring in 2009.

== Professional career ==
While playing with PBC Lukoil Academic, he is the all-time Leader of the ULEB Cup in total points scored (1102), assists (190), minutes played (2364), fouls against (305) and also in total Index Rating (914). Stoykov also ranks third in free-throws made (326). He was the all-time leader for three-pointers made (169) until November 2014 when Marko Popović beat that mark.

Stoykov announced his retirement at the end of the 2012–13 season. He was honored by the Lukoil Academic by becoming the first player in team history to have his number retired by the team; his #15 was raised to the rafters.

== Honours ==
Cherno More

- Bulgarian Basketball League champion (2 times): 1998, 1999
- Bulgarian Basketball Cup (3 times): 1998, 1999, 2000

Lukoil Academic

- Bulgarian Basketball League champion (10 times): 2003, 2004, 2005, 2007, 2008, 2009, 2010, 2011, 2012, 2013
- Bulgarian Basketball Cup (6 times): 2002, 2003, 2004, 2007, 2008, 2011, 2012, 2013
- FIBA Europe Conference South: winners (1): 2003
