= Robert Garrett (basketball) =

German basketball player (born 1977)

Robert Garrett (born 18 March 1977) is a former German professional basketball player from Ochsenfurt, Bavaria. From 1996 to 2002, Garrett played with DJK Würzburg, where he was a teammate of Dirk Nowitzki until Nowitzki’s 1998 departure to the NBA. Before transferring to Bayern Munich, he played for the Brose Baskets of the 1st Division. He is 1.92 m (6 ft 3 ¾ in) in height and weighs 98 kg (215 pounds). Garrett was also a member of the German national basketball team. He competed at the 2008 Olympic Games.
