= FIBA EuroBasket 2009 Division B =

The FIBA EuroBasket Division B was the second-ranked tier of the bi-annual FIBA EuroBasket competition. The two winners of this tournament qualified for the FIBA EuroBasket 2011 Division A qualification.

== 2008–09 Qualifying Tournament ==
The qualifying tournament was played from 6 September 2008 to 5 September 2009. The winner of each group and the best second-placed team played one knock-out series, with the winners qualifying for the FIBA EuroBasket 2011 Division A qualification.

=== Group A ===
Team	PCT.	W	L	PF	PA	Diff
Montenegro	1.000	8	0	705	516	+189
Netherlands	.625	5	3	592	550	+42
Austria	.500	4	4	572	587	−15
Iceland	.375	3	5	561	623	−62
Denmark	.000	0	8	493	647	−154

6 Sep 2008
14:30

Boxscore

Denmark	64–73	Austria
Scoring by quarter: 19–13, 15–20, 15–23, 15–17
Pts: Iversen 19; Rebs: Johansen 7 Asts: Colman 3		Pts: Mayes 22; Rebs: Poiger 4 Asts: Schreiner 4

Aarhus Arena, Aarhus
Referees: Apostolos Kalpakas (SWE), Moritz Reiter (GER)

6 Sep 2008
19:30

Boxscore

Netherlands	63–70	Montenegro
Scoring by quarter: 18–23, 14–16, 19–10, 12–21
Pts: Akerboom 15; Rebs: Elson 13; Asts: Defares 5		Pts: Drobnjak 14; Rebs: Pekovic 9 Asts: Cook 7

Topsportcentrum, Almere
Attendance: 1,500
Referees: Serge De Coster (BEL), Marek Maliszewski (POL)

10 Sep 2008
20:20

Boxscore

Austria	54–58	Netherlands
Scoring by quarter: 9–18, 5–12, 19–10, 21–18
Pts: Mayes 14; Rebs: Speiser 10; Asts: Mayer 3		Pts: Elson 12; Rebs: Elson 8 Asts: Slagter 6

Aktivpark, Güssing
Referees: Alfred Jovovic (CRO), Panagiotis Anastopoulos (GRE)

10 Sep 2008
20:45

Boxscore

Iceland	77–71	Denmark
Scoring by quarter: 25–19, 15–18, 24–17, 13–17
Pts: J. Stefansson 14; Rebs: F. Olafsson 10; Asts: L. Gunnarsson 6		Pts: Colman 15; Rebs: Christoffersen 11; Asts: Darbo, Nielsen 3

Laugardalshöll, Reykjavík
Attendance: 1,675
Referees: Nicolas Maestre (FRA), Daniel Berler (SWE)

13 Sep 2008
19:30

Boxscore

Netherlands	84–68	Iceland
Scoring by quarter: 25–13, 12–19, 21–21, 26–15
Pts: Elson 28; Rebs: Elson 11; Asts: Van Paassen, Slagter 4		Pts: Vilbergsson 12; Rebs: F. Stefánsson, Baeringsson 5 Asts: F. Stefánsson 3

Topsportcentrum, Almere
Referees: Boris Schmidt (GER), Claude Roettgers (LUX)

13 Sep 2008
20:30

Boxscore

Montenegro	96–73	Austria
Scoring by quarter: 24–10, 26–22, 25–19, 21–22
Pts: Pekovic 22; Rebs: Dasic 7 Asts: Jeretin 6		Pts: Jandl 16; Rebs: Kügerl 8 Asts: Jandl 3

Arena of KK Budućnost, Podgorica
Attendance: 2,550
Referees: Dragan Medan (CRO), Dragan Kralj (BIH)

17 Sep 2008
19:15

Boxscore

Denmark	64–79	Netherlands
Scoring by quarter: 22–19, 17–15, 6–17, 19–28
Pts: Clarance 15; Rebs: Iversen 9 Asts: Iversen 4		Pts: Van Paassen 19; Rebs: Elson 10; Asts: Defares 8

Arena of BC Aarhus, Aarhus
Referees: Neil Wilkinson (ENG), Fabien Conderanne (FRA)

17 Sep 2008
19:15

Boxscore

Iceland	66–80	Montenegro
Scoring by quarter: 14–22, 10–25, 17–15, 25–18
Pts: J. Stefansson 20; Rebs: Baeringsson 7 Asts: J. Stefansson 4		Pts: Scepanovic 16; Rebs: Golubović 12; Asts: Cook 5

Laugardalshöll, Reykjavík
Attendance: 1,000
Referees: Keith Williams (ENG), Haydn Jones (GBR)

20 Sep 2008
20:20

Boxscore

Austria	81–74	Iceland
Scoring by quarter: 14–14, 25–25, 16–17, 26–18
Pts: Mayes 15; Rebs: Mayer 9 Asts: Schreiner 4		Pts: Vilbergsson 18; Rebs: Baeringsson 8 Asts: J. Stefansson 4

Aktivpark, Güssing
Referees: Ivan Zachara (CZE), Luca Carlini (SUI)

20 Sep 2008
20:30

Boxscore

Montenegro	96–60	Denmark
Scoring by quarter: 24–16, 27–14, 17–17, 28–13
Pts: Pekovic 25; Rebs: Pekovic, Dasic 6 Asts: Jeretin, Cook 5		Pts: Iversen 12; Rebs: Johansen 7 Asts: Johansen 3

Arena of KK Budućnost, Podgorica
Attendance: 2,980
Referees: Sreten Radovic (CRO), Aleksandar Milojevic (MKD)

15 Aug 2009
20:20

Boxscore

Austria	92–61	Denmark
Scoring by quarter: 28–14, 24–14, 18–20, 22–13
Pts: Stazic 14; Rebs: Mahalbasic 5 Asts: Stazic 5		Pts: Iversen, Frandsen 12; Rebs: Frandsen 6 Asts: Darbo, Jakobsen, Hesseldahl, Nielsen, Schur, Iversen, Frandsen 1

Arena of Oberwart Gunners, Oberwart
Referees: Dimitar Gologanov (BUL), Vaclav Lukes (CZE), Carmelo Lo Guzzo (ITA)

15 Aug 2009
21:00

Boxscore

Montenegro	93–68	Netherlands
Scoring by quarter: 25–19, 23–22, 18–16, 27–11
Pts: Scepanovic 17; Rebs: Golubović, Pekovic 5 Asts: Cook 4		Pts: Jansen 16; Rebs: Elson 6 Asts: Van Paassen, Slagter 3

Arena of KK Budućnost, Podgorica
Attendance: 3,450
Referees: Sreten Radovic (CRO), Gentian Cici (ALB), Damir Javor (SLO)

19 Aug 2009
19:15

Boxscore

Denmark	54–66	Iceland
Scoring by quarter: 16–23, 12–12, 16–17, 10–14
Pts: Darbo 10; Rebs: Iversen 10; Asts: Darbo, Iversen 4		Pts: J. Stefansson 21; Rebs: Vilbergsson 7 Asts: Ermolinskij 4

Aalborg Stadionhal, Aalborg
Referees: José Martín (ESP), Chris Dodds (GBR), Haydn Jones (GBR)

19 Aug 2009
19:30

Boxscore

Netherlands	83–60	Austria
Scoring by quarter: 32–10, 7–23, 23–13, 21–14
Pts: Slagter 22; Rebs: Elson 15; Asts: Slagter 7		Pts: Nagler 17; Rebs: Stazic 5 Asts: Stazic 4

Topsportcentrum, Almere
Attendance: 1,250
Referees: Ivan Zachara (CZE), Benjamin Barth (GER), Johann Jeanneau (FRA)

22 Aug 2009
16:00

Boxscore

Iceland	87–75	Netherlands
Scoring by quarter: 24–12, 35–19, 7–24, 21–20
Pts: J. Stefansson 23; Rebs: Ermolinskij 8 Asts: Ermolinskij 10		Pts: Elson 13; Rebs: Elson 12; Asts: Defares 5

Smarinn, Kópavogur
Referees: Robert Hickman (ENG), Karolina Andersson (FIN), Joakim Forsberg (SWE)

22 Aug 2009
20:15

Boxscore

Austria	63–86	Montenegro
Scoring by quarter: 25–35, 9–15, 17–21, 12–15
Pts: Detrick 16; Rebs: Kügerl 11; Asts: Stazic 4		Pts: Pekovic 14; Rebs: Scepanovic, Dasic 6 Asts: Cook 4

Arena of Oberwart Gunners, Oberwart
Referees: Fabio Facchini (ITA), Borys Shulga (UKR), Tomislav Vovk (CRO)

26 Aug 2009
19:30

Boxscore

Netherlands	82–54	Denmark
Scoring by quarter: 15–16, 23–12, 30–8, 14–18
Pts: Defares 17; Rebs: Defares 6 Asts: Jansen 5		Pts: Schur, Iversen 13; Rebs: Nielsen, Hakanowitz 6 Asts: Nielsen 6

Topsportcentrum, Almere
Referees: Stelian Banica (ROU), Andrej Jersan (SLO), Petri Mäntylä (FIN)

26 Aug 2009
21:00

Boxscore

Montenegro	102–58	Iceland
Scoring by quarter: 29–12, 18–22, 25–15, 30–9
Pts: Golubović 18; Rebs: Pekovic 10; Asts: Jeretin 10		Pts: L. Gunnarsson 12; Rebs: Thorsteinsson 9 Asts: M. Gunnarsson, Ermolinskij, T. Olafsson, Vilbergsson, Thorsteinsson 1

Arena of KK Budućnost, Podgorica
Attendance: 2,200
Referees: Shefqet Bekteshi (ALB), Ademir Zurapovic (BIH), Sinisa Herceg (CRO)

29 Aug 2009
14:15

Boxscore

Denmark	65–82	Montenegro
Scoring by quarter: 16–26, 20–26, 17–19, 12–11
Pts: Jakobsen 19; Rebs: Iversen 6 Asts: Iversen 5		Pts: Pekovic 24; Rebs: Maras 5 Asts: Cook 8

Farum Arena, Farum
Attendance: 1,200
Referees: Pekka Saros (FIN), Andres Tobi (EST), Juan Arteaga (ESP)

29 Aug 2009
16:30

Boxscore

Iceland	65–76	Austria
Scoring by quarter: 17–23, 17–22, 14–15, 17–16
Pts: L. Gunnarsson 17; Rebs: Baeringsson 8 Asts: Ermolinskij 4		Pts: Jandl 18; Rebs: Mahalbasic 11; Asts: Stazic 5

Smarinn, Kópavogur
Referees: David Chambon (FRA), Tomasz Trawicki (POL), Daniel Berler (SWE)

=== Group B ===
Team	PCT.	W	L	PF	PA	Diff	Tie
Belarus	.875	7	1	621	547	+74	
Switzerland	.625	5	3	561	567	−6	
Cyprus	.375	3	5	566	538	+28	2–0
Romania	.375	3	5	600	566	+34	0–2
Albania	.250	2	6	536	666	−130	

6 Sep 2008
17:30

Boxscore

Switzerland	91–79	Albania
Scoring by quarter: 27–22, 17–26, 27–12, 20–19
Pts: Mladjan 30; Rebs: Vogt 7 Asts: Wegmann 4		Pts: Mitku 22; Rebs: Hysenagolli 13; Asts: Shima 3

Palamondo, Cadempino (Lugano)
Referees: Pavel Volejnik (CZE), Regis Bardera (FRA)

6 Sep 2008
19:15

Boxscore

Romania	70–71	Cyprus
Scoring by quarter: 15–17, 24–18, 14–17, 17–19
Pts: Szijarto, Popescu 15; Rebs: Popescu 9 Asts: Burlacu 5		Pts: Koronides 19; Rebs: Kounounis, Roundy 6 Asts: Anastasiadis, Kounounis 2

Arena of Universitatea-Elba, Timișoara
Attendance: 1,000
Referees: Branislav Mrdak (SRB), Alexey Davydov (RUS)

10 Sep 2008
18:00

Boxscore

Belarus	70–59	Romania
Scoring by quarter: 25–14, 12–12, 13–11, 20–22
Pts: Aliakseyeu 16; Rebs: Aliakseyeu 7 Asts: Kandrusevich, Kudrautsau 3		Pts: Stanescu 14; Rebs: Szijarto 7 Asts: Helcioiu, Paul 2

Olimpiec Sports Complex, Mogilev
Attendance: 1,250
Referees: Virginijus Dovidavicius (LTU), Igor Demenkov (RUS)

10 Sep 2008
18:45

Boxscore

Cyprus	59–61	Switzerland
Scoring by quarter: 13–12, 9–15, 15–17, 22–17
Pts: Trisokkas 19; Rebs: Trisokkas 10; Asts: Pilavas, Kounounis, Koronides 3		Pts: Mladjan 19; Rebs: Ramseier 10; Asts: Wegmann 4

Arena of Keravnos Keo, Nicosia
Attendance: 1,200
Referees: Yaron Zarif (ISR), Zlatin Karanikolov (BUL)

13 Sep 2008
17:30

Boxscore

Switzerland	77–81	Belarus
Scoring by quarter: 23–18, 15–24, 19–14, 20–25
Pts: Vogt 17; Rebs: Ramseier 12; Asts: Vogt 3		Pts: Kuzmin, Kandrusevich 16; Rebs: Aliakseyeu 8 Asts: Meshcharakou, Kandrusevich 3

Palamondo, Cadempino (Lugano)
Referees: Nuno Monteiro (POR), Francisco Araña (ESP)

13 Sep 2008
20:00

Boxscore

Albania	69–63	Cyprus
Scoring by quarter: 18–14, 14–14, 22–18, 15–17
Pts: Shima 18; Rebs: Hysenagolli 17; Asts: Karaj, Hysenagolli 3		Pts: Trisokkas 20; Rebs: Trisokkas 12; Asts: Pantouris, Kounounis 2

Arena of SC Tirana, Tirana
Referees: Dimitar Gologanov (BUL), Igor Dragojevic (MNE)

17 Sep 2008
18:00

Boxscore

Belarus	92–46	Albania
Scoring by quarter: 21–9, 27–11, 23–14, 21–12
Pts: Kudrautsau 15; Rebs: Aliakseyeu 9 Asts: Charykau 4		Pts: Shima 13; Rebs: Hysenagolli 11; Asts: Talelli, Karaj 1

Olimpiec Sports Complex, Mogilev
Attendance: 1,200
Referees: Nicolay Kolotil'shchikov (RUS), Sergiy Zashchuk (UKR)

17 Sep 2008
19:00

Boxscore

Romania	83–53	Switzerland
Scoring by quarter: 22–10, 22–19, 25–14, 14–10
Pts: Popescu 26; Rebs: Stanescu 10; Asts: Paul 5		Pts: Wegmann, Ramseier 10; Rebs: Wegmann 8 Asts: Louissaint 3

Arena of CSU, Sibiu
Attendance: 1,000
Referees: Engin Kennerman (TUR), Dumitru Stasiev (MDA)

20 Sep 2008
18:00

Boxscore

Cyprus	80–81	Belarus
Scoring by quarter: 14–15, 27–22, 17–26, 22–18
Pts: Koronides, Roundy 19; Rebs: Trisokkas 9 Asts: Koronides 4		Pts: Kudrautsau 17; Rebs: Aliakseyeu 7 Asts: Charykau 7

Arena of Keravnos Keo, Nicosia
Referees: Miodrag Licina (SRB), Moise Bitton (ISR)

20 Sep 2008
20:00

Boxscore

Albania	66–80	Romania
Scoring by quarter: 21–25, 14–18, 13–21, 18–16
Pts: Karaj 20; Rebs: Hysenagolli 14; Asts: Karaj 4		Pts: Burlacu 15; Rebs: Stanescu 11; Asts: Burlacu 3

Arena of SC Tirana, Tirana
Referees: Marjan Stojovski (MKD), Radomir Vojinovic (MNE)

15 Aug 2009
19:30

Boxscore

Cyprus	78–69 (OT)	Romania
Scoring by quarter: 18–17, 20–15, 13–17, 11–13, Overtime: 16–7
Pts: Trisokkas 18; Rebs: Trisokkas 7 Asts: Koronides 6		Pts: Moldoveanu 20; Rebs: Moldoveanu 13; Asts: Tudor, Mandache, Silvasan 3

Eleftheria Indoor Hall, Nicosia
Referees: Milan Brziak (SVK), Seffi Shemmesh (ISR), Sasa Maricic (SRB)

15 Aug 2009
20:00

Boxscore

Albania	76–73	Switzerland
Scoring by quarter: 15–12, 15–24, 25–18, 21–19
Pts: Bushati 24; Rebs: Luca 8 Asts: Karaj 3		Pts: Wegmann 17; Rebs: Ramseier, Molteni, Vogt 6 Asts: Wegmann 3

Tamara Nikolla Sports Palace, Korçë
Referees: Dragan Kralj (BIH), Igor Mitrovski(MKD), Ioannis Foufis (GRE)

19 Aug 2009
17:00

Boxscore

Romania	70–78	Belarus
Scoring by quarter: 17–24, 20–22, 12–12, 21–20
Pts: Nicoara 19; Rebs: Moldoveanu 8 Asts: Szijarto 5		Pts: Korshuk 20; Rebs: Korshuk 7 Asts: Charykau 4

Olimpia Sports Hall, Ploiești
Attendance: 1,000
Referees: Miodrag Licina (SRB), Ismail Özgün (TUR), Petros Papapetrou (GRE)

19 Aug 2009
20:45

Boxscore

Switzerland	55–54	Cyprus
Scoring by quarter: 9–15, 15–10, 10–15, 21–14
Pts: Sefolosha 21; Rebs: Sefolosha 11; Asts: Sefolosha, Buscaglia 2		Pts: Trisokkas 18; Rebs: Trisokkas 10; Asts: Pilavas 4

Arena of Union Neuchâtel, Neuchâtel
Attendance: 1,350
Referees: Robert Paulik (CZE), Gianluca Mattioli (ITA), Carlos Santos (POR)

22 Aug 2009
18:00

Boxscore

Belarus	66–70	Switzerland
Scoring by quarter: 15–20, 16–16, 18–18, 17–16
Pts: Pustahvar 21; Rebs: Meshcharakou 8 Asts: Kudrautsau 3		Pts: Buscaglia 17; Rebs: Molteni 11; Asts: Sefolosha 4

Olimpiec Sports Complex, Mogilev
Referees: Dariusz Szczerba (POL), Emin Mogulkoc (TUR), Tanel Suslov (EST)

22 Aug 2009
19:30

Boxscore

Cyprus	91–56	Albania
Scoring by quarter: 20–11, 21–13, 25–17, 25–15
Pts: Sizopoulos, Liatsos 14; Rebs: Kaskiris 6 Asts: Liatsos, Trisokkas, Razis 3		Pts: Luca 13; Rebs: Luca 9 Asts: Hysenagolli 2

Eleftheria Indoor Hall, Nicosia
Referees: Miroslav Tomov (BUL), Eyal Pohoriles (ISR), Elias Koromilas (GRE)

26 Aug 2009
20:00

Boxscore

Albania	75–76	Belarus
Scoring by quarter: 25–19, 15–12, 13–19, 22–26
Pts: Karaj 22; Rebs: Hysenagolli 9 Asts: Luca 4		Pts: Kudrautsau 25; Rebs: Trastsinetski 6 Asts: Ulyanko, Charykau 2

Tamara Nikolla Sports Palace, Korçë
Attendance: 1,000
Referees: Nikola Lepetic (MNE), Petar Denkovski (MKD), Ioannis Foufis (GRE)

26 Aug 2009
20:45

Boxscore

Switzerland	81–69	Romania
Scoring by quarter: 26–9, 19–14, 16–24, 20–22
Pts: Sefolosha 21; Rebs: Molteni 10; Asts: Louissaint, Sefolosha 5		Pts: Nicoara 19; Rebs: Nicoara 7 Asts: Mandache 5

Arena of Union Neuchâtel, Neuchâtel
Attendance: 1,203
Referees: Marko Vuckovic (SLO), Roberto Chiari (ITA), Michel Glod (LUX)

29 Aug 2009
18:00

Boxscore

Belarus	77–70	Cyprus
Scoring by quarter: 21–18, 18–15, 22–19, 16–18
Pts: Kudrautsau 16; Rebs: Meshcharakou, Korshuk, Kudrautsau 4 Asts: Charykau 3		Pts: Liatsos 19; Rebs: Trisokkas 10; Asts: Yiannas 3

Olimpiec Sports Complex, Mogilev
Referees: Tonci Anzulovic (CRO), Viktor Bozhenar (UKR), Jurgis Laurinavicius (LTU)

29 Aug 2009
18:00

Boxscore

Romania	100–69	Albania
Scoring by quarter: 32–20, 26–15, 21–23, 21–11
Pts: Nicoara 22; Rebs: Nicoara 9 Asts: Silvasan 4		Pts: Luca 24; Rebs: Luca 12; Asts: Karaj 4

Arena of C.S. Rapid, Bucharest
Referees: Iskren Manolov (BUL), Charalampos Karakatsounis (GRE), Igor Dragojevic (MNE)

=== Group C ===
Team	PCT.	W	L	PF	PA	Diff	Tie
Georgia	.875	7	1	738	549	+189	1–1 +8
Sweden	.875	7	1	627	491	+136	1–1 -8
Slovakia	.500	4	4	630	631	−1	
Ireland	.250	2	6	616	663	−47	
Luxembourg	.000	0	8	512	789	−277	

6 Sep 2008
16:30

Boxscore

Sweden	82–63	Ireland
Scoring by quarter: 18–11, 11–17, 22–17, 31–18
Pts: Blom 19; Rebs: Jerebko 10; Asts: Grant 8		Pts: Bracey 18; Rebs: O'Reilly 8 Asts: J. J. Larranaga, McGrath 2

Täljehallen, Södertälje
Attendance: 1,000
Referees: Sergey Bulanov (RUS), Andris Aunkrogers (LAT)

6 Sep 2008
20:30

Boxscore

Luxembourg	65–98	Georgia
Scoring by quarter: 13–24, 20–28, 18–24, 14–22
Pts: M. Rajniak 13; Rebs: M. Rajniak 5 Asts: Schumacher, Kieffer 2		Pts: Ellis Junior 24; Rebs: Sanikidze 12; Asts: Pachulia, Ellis Junior 3

Centre National Sportif & Culturel d'Coque, Luxembourg City
Referees: Borys Shulga (UKR), Emin Mogulkoc (TUR)

10 Sep 2008
19:30

Boxscore

Ireland	77–94	Georgia
Scoring by quarter: 13–23, 20–14, 13–23, 31–34
Pts: McGrath 32; Rebs: Bracey 9 Asts: McGrath 4		Pts: Sanikidze 31; Rebs: Pachulia 9 Asts: Tsintsadze 6

National Basketball Arena, Dublin
Referees: Fernando Rocha (POR), David Chambon (FRA)

10 Sep 2008
20:00

Boxscore

Slovakia	88–89	Sweden
Scoring by quarter: 23–20, 17–26, 19–19, 29–24
Pts: R. Rancik 34; Rebs: R. Rancik 9 Asts: Gavlák 6		Pts: Massamba, Skjöldebrand 19; Rebs: Jerebko 12; Asts: Massamba 5

Sport Hall, Spišská Nová Ves
Attendance: 1,200
Referees: Jakub Zamojski (POL), Peter Papp (HUN)

13 Sep 2008
18:00

Boxscore

Slovakia	78–101	Georgia
Scoring by quarter: 17–31, 13–26, 23–28, 25–16
Pts: Lesko 19; Rebs: Pesta 5 Asts: Pandula 6		Pts: Pachulia 27; Rebs: Tskitishvili 6 Asts: Tsintsadze 9

Sport Hall, Spišská Nová Ves
Attendance: 1,200
Referees: Yair Michaelly (ISR), Aytug Ekti (TUR)

13 Sep 2008
19:30

Boxscore

Luxembourg	70–97	Ireland
Scoring by quarter: 21–33, 13–24, 17–23, 19–17
Pts: Schumacher 26; Rebs: Muller 5 Asts: Schumacher 2		Pts: O'Boyle 19; Rebs: Grace 11; Asts: McGrath 5

Centre National Sportif & Culturel d'Coque, Luxembourg City
Referees: Gabriel Roceanu (ROU), Anthonie Sinterniklaas (NED)

17 Sep 2008
18:00

Boxscore

Slovakia	110–67	Luxembourg
Scoring by quarter: 32–17, 23–16, 24–17, 31–17
Pts: Lesko 17; Rebs: Sykora 8 Asts: Lesko 5		Pts: P. Rajniak 21; Rebs: M. Rajniak 12; Asts: Thill 3

City Sport Hall, Levice
Attendance: 1,000
Referees: Tomislav Kovacic (SLO), Volodymyr Drabikovskyi (UKR)

17 Sep 2008
19:00

Boxscore

Sweden	61–59	Georgia
Scoring by quarter: 18–18, 24–13, 12–11, 7–17
Pts: Grant 11; Rebs: Ringström 9 Asts: Massamba 5		Pts: Sanikidze 19; Rebs: Sanikidze 10; Asts: Tsintsadze 9

Umeå Energi Arena, Umeå
Attendance: 1,500
Referees: Aare Halliko (EST), Oskars Lucis (LAT)

20 Sep 2008
15:30

Boxscore

Ireland	88–95 (OT)	Slovakia
Scoring by quarter: 25–30, 21–20, 12–17, 22–13, Overtime: 8–15
Pts: Bracey 22; Rebs: Grace 15; Asts: McGrath 4		Pts: R. Rancik 24; Rebs: R. Rancik 13; Asts: Gavel 3

National Basketball Arena, Dublin
Attendance: 1,000
Referees: Nicolas Maestre (FRA), Marcin Kowalski (POL)

20 Sep 2008
19:30

Boxscore

Luxembourg	51–96	Sweden
Scoring by quarter: 14–21, 16–20, 11–28, 10–27
Pts: Kieffer 16; Rebs: M. Rajniak 5 Asts: M. Rajniak 4		Pts: Ringström 22; Rebs: Inan 9 Asts: Inan 5

Centre National Sportif & Culturel d'Coque, Luxembourg City
Referees: Chantal Julien (FRA), Bert Van Slooten (NED)

15 Aug 2009
17:00

Boxscore

Ireland	50–66	Sweden
Scoring by quarter: 2–15, 18–25, 16–11, 14–15
Pts: Mullins 10; Rebs: Killeen 7 Asts: Mullins 4		Pts: Levin 13; Rebs: Kjellbom 7 Asts: Grant 2

National Basketball Arena, Dublin
Attendance: 1,200
Referees: Eddie Viator (FRA), Miguel Angel Perez Niz (ESP), Renaud Geller (BEL)

15 Aug 2009
19:00

Boxscore

Georgia	116–73	Luxembourg
Scoring by quarter: 31–17, 29–11, 22–25, 33–20
Pts: Ellis Junior 23; Rebs: Sanikidze 15; Asts: Ellis Junior 6		Pts: M. Rajniak 20; Rebs: M. Rajniak 7 Asts: Schumacher, Birenbaum, P. Rajniak 2

Arena of Azot Rustavi, Tbilisi
Attendance: 6,000
Referees: Volodymyr Drabikovskyi (UKR), Tamas Földhazi (HUN), Ersan Kartal (TUR)

19 Aug 2009
19:00

Boxscore

Georgia	98–73	Ireland
Scoring by quarter: 21–15, 27–23, 21–15, 29–20
Pts: Tsintsadze 19; Rebs: Sanikidze 15; Asts: Tsintsadze 10		Pts: Mullins 18; Rebs: O'Reilly 10; Asts: O'Reilly, Grace 3

Arena of Azot Rustavi, Tbilisi
Attendance: 7,000
Referees: Recep Ankarali (TUR), Sergiy Chebyshev (UKR), Vladimir Tsekov (BUL)

19 Aug 2009
19:05

Boxscore

Sweden	64–58	Slovakia
Scoring by quarter: 24–16, 9–5, 11–23, 20–14
Pts: Kjellbom 18; Rebs: Kjellbom 6 Asts: Grant 8		Pts: Gavel 19; Rebs: Szalay 10; Asts: Gavel 8

Stadium Arena (Norrköping), Norrköping
Attendance: 1,503
Referees: Aare Halliko (EST), Oskars Lucis (LAT), Marek Maliszewski (POL)

22 Aug 2009
17:00

Boxscore

Ireland	100–83	Luxembourg
Scoring by quarter: 35–17, 26–19, 22–32, 17–15
Pts: O'Reilly 25; Rebs: Grace 9 Asts: Mullins 10		Pts: P. Rajniak 22; Rebs: P. Rajniak 6 Asts: Schumacher 6

National Basketball Arena, Dublin
Referees: Francis Santos (GIB), Tolga Sahin (ITA), Bert Van Slooten (NED)

22 Aug 2009
19:00

Boxscore

Georgia	91–50	Slovakia
Scoring by quarter: 24–8, 22–12, 24–13, 21–17
Pts: Pachulia 34; Rebs: Pachulia, Sanikidze 14; Asts: Tsintsadze 5		Pts: Gavel 22; Rebs: Novák 6 Asts: Gavel, Szalay 2

Arena of Azot Rustavi, Tbilisi
Attendance: 8,500
Referees: Murat Biricik (TUR), Sergiy Zashchuk (UKR), Gil Oved (ISR)

26 Aug 2009
19:00

Boxscore

Georgia	82–72	Sweden
Scoring by quarter: 17–13, 24–22, 19–20, 22–17
Pts: Pachulia 21; Rebs: Sanikidze 13; Asts: Tsintsadze, Sanikidze 3		Pts: Levin 17; Rebs: Kjellbom 6 Asts: Grant, Ringström 3

Arena of Azot Rustavi, Tbilisi
Attendance: 9,600
Referees: Yaari Rainisch (ISR), Spyridon Gontas (GRE), Roman Ponomarenko (UKR)

26 Aug 2009
19:30

Boxscore

Luxembourg	63–76	Slovakia
Scoring by quarter: 14–15, 19–21, 19–16, 11–24
Pts: Schumacher 19; Rebs: M. Rajniak 7 Asts: M. Rajniak 3		Pts: Gavel 22; Rebs: Majoros 11; Asts: Gavel 5

Centre Culturel et Sportif "Am Sand", Oberanven
Referees: Paolo Taurino (ITA), Bernard Vassallo (MLT), Luis Lopes (POR)

29 Aug 2009
18:00

Boxscore

Slovakia	75–68	Ireland
Scoring by quarter: 24–16, 18–17, 14–14, 19–21
Pts: Gavel 18; Rebs: Sykora 6 Asts: Novák 4		Pts: Mullins 18; Rebs: Williams 20; Asts: Mullins 3

City Sport Hall, Levice
Referees: Tomasz Kudlicki (POL), Borys Ryzhyk (UKR), Marius Udrica (ROU)

29 Aug 2009
19:00

Boxscore

Sweden	97–40	Luxembourg
Scoring by quarter: 15–12, 19–6, 36–8, 27–14
Pts: Kjellbom 28; Rebs: Kjellbom 9 Asts: Levin, Inan 4		Pts: Schumacher 14; Rebs: M. Rajniak 6 Asts: Schumacher, M. Rajniak 2

Stadium Arena (Norrköping), Norrköping
Attendance: 1,223
Referees: Juris Kokainis (LAT), Rafael Ganiev (RUS), Mart Uuehendrik (EST)

=== Best Runners-up ===
Team	PCT.	W	L	PF	PA	Diff	Group
Sweden	.875	7	1	627	491	+136	C
Netherlands	.625	5	3	592	550	+42	A
Switzerland	.625	5	3	561	567	−6	B

== Promotional Phase ==
5 September 2009
17:00

Game 1 Boxscore

Sweden	50–70	Montenegro
Scoring by quarter: 15–15, 12–19, 12–25, 11–11
Pts: Akesson 13; Rebs: Lindqvist 5 Asts: Massamba 3		Pts: Peković 24; Rebs: Drobnjak, Cook 7 Asts: Cook 4

Stadium Arena, Norrköping
Attendance: 823
Referees: Regis Bardera (FRA), Oliver Krause (GER), Ingus Baumanis (LAT)

5 September 2009
18:30

Game 1 Boxscore

Belarus	75–89	Georgia
Scoring by quarter: 17–23, 15–22, 22–19, 21–25
Pts: Ulyanko 18; Rebs: Meshcharakou 8 Asts: Charykau 4		Pts: Pachulia, Sanikidze 19; Rebs: Sanikidze 11; Asts: Tsintsadze 5

Olimpiec Sports Complex, Mogilev
Attendance: 1,300
Referees: Oscar Lefwerth (SWE), Milan Mazic (SRB), Sergiy Chaykovskyy (UKR)

9 September 2009
19:00

Game 2 Boxscore

Georgia	86–84	Belarus
Scoring by quarter: 27–19, 25–27, 19–22, 15–16
Pts: Sanikidze 18; Rebs: Sanikidze 10; Asts: Tsintsadze 6		Pts: Kudrautsau 28; Rebs: Aliakseyeu 8 Asts: Kudrautsau 3

Tbilisi Sports Palace, Tbilisi
Attendance: 11,000
Referees: Juris Kokainis (LAT), Vaclav Lukes (CZE), Rüstü Nuran (TUR)

Georgia wins series 2-0 and advances to FIBA EuroBasket 2011 Division A

9 September 2009
21:00

Game 2 Boxscore

Montenegro	88–71	Sweden
Scoring by quarter: 20–14, 23–26, 24–10, 21–21
Pts: Peković 17; Rebs: Golubović 6 Asts: Cook 4		Pts: Ringström 17; Rebs: Kjellbom 6 Asts: Levin 4

Arena of KK Budućnost, Podgorica
Attendance: 2,200
Referees: Sasa Pukl (SLO), Georgios Tanatzis (GRE), Robert Vyklicky (CZE)

Montenegro wins series 2-0 and advances to Eurobasket 2011 Division A

== Statistical Leaders ==
Points

Rank	Name	G	Pts	PPG
1	(Georgia (country)) Viktor Sanikidze	10	186	18.6
2	(Montenegro) Nikola Peković	10	181	18.1
3	(Georgia (country)) Zaza Pachulia	10	179	17.9
4	(Slovakia) Anton Gavel	6	107	17.8
5	(Luxembourg) Tom Schumacher	6	103	17.2

Rebounds

Rank	Name	G	Rbs	RPG
1	(Georgia (country)) Viktor Sanikidze	10	110	11.0
2	(Netherlands) Francisco Elson	7	75	10.7
3	(Albania) Endrit Hysenagolli	8	84	10.5
4	(Georgia (country)) Zaza Pachulia	10	85	8.5
5	(Cyprus) Panagiotis Trisokkas	8	68	8.5

Assists

Rank	Name	G	Asts	APG
1	(Georgia (country)) Giorgi Tsintsadze	10	58	5.8
2	(Montenegro) Omar Cook	10	49	4.9
3	(Slovakia) Anton Gavel	6	24	4.0
4	(Netherlands) Arvin Slagter	8	30	3.8
5	(Sweden) Kenny Grant	9	33	3.7
