= FIBA EuroBasket 2007 Division B =

FIBA EuroBasket Division B was the lower tier of the EuroBasket Tournament. At the same time that Division A had the European Championship, division B had a championship to determine which teams would get promoted into division A for the following year.

== Group Phase ==
=== Group A ===
| Team | Pld | W | L | PF | PA | PD | Pts | Tie |
|---|---|---|---|---|---|---|---|---|
| Switzerland | 6 | 5 | 1 | 409 | 347 | +62 | 11 | 1–1 +5 |
| Romania | 6 | 5 | 1 | 411 | 369 | +42 | 11 | 1–1 -5 |
| Ireland | 6 | 1 | 5 | 380 | 438 | −58 | 7 | 1–1 +1 |
| Cyprus | 6 | 1 | 5 | 390 | 436 | −46 | 7 | 1–1 -1 |

Rules=1) Points; 2) Head-to-head results; 3) Points difference; 4) Points scored.

3 Sep 2006
17:00

Boxscore

| Switzerland | 59–57 | Ireland |
Scoring by quarter: 15–11, 17–18, 15–12, 12–16
| Pts: Porchet 12; Rebs: Vogt 6 Asts: Jaquier 3 | | Pts: Burke 14; Rebs: Burke, Conlon 8 Asts: J. J. Larranaga, Bree 2 |

Arena of Geneve Basket, Geneva
Attendance: 1,850
Referees: Carlos Santos (POR), Fabien Conderanne (FRA)

3 Sep 2006
20:00

Boxscore

| Romania | 79–64 | Cyprus |
Scoring by quarter: 20–17, 22–12, 20–15, 17–20
| Pts: Popescu 18; Rebs: Popescu 9 Asts: Helcioiu, Tenter, Popescu 1 | | Pts: Trisokkas 17; Rebs: Perentos, Trisokkas 4 Asts: Yiannas, Palalas, Mouktaris 1 |

Horia Demian Sports Hall, Cluj-Napoca
Attendance: 2,500
Referees: Dragan Neskovic (SRB), Sergiy Zashchuk (UKR)

9 Sep 2006
15:30

Boxscore

| Ireland | 62–81 | Romania |
Scoring by quarter: 12–24, 13–21, 16–20, 21–16
| Pts: J. J. Larranaga 24; Rebs: Burke, Callahan 6 Asts: Burke, Bree 4 | | Pts: Helcioiu 22; Rebs: Stanescu 8 Asts: Helcioiu 6 |

National Basketball Arena, Dublin
Attendance: 1,500
Referees: Vincent Delestrée (BEL), Petra Kremer (GER)

9 Sep 2006
17:00

Boxscore

| Cyprus | 46–64 | Switzerland |
Scoring by quarter: 12–14, 8–19, 14–15, 12–16
| Pts: Trisokkas 13; Rebs: Trisokkas 5 Asts: Palalas, Trisokkas 2 | | Pts: Imgrüth 15; Rebs: Vogt 8 Asts: Nattiel, K. Sefolosha 3 |

Arena of Keravnos Keo, Strovolos/Nicosia
Referees: Iskren Manolov (BUL), Sasa Maricic (SRB)

16 Sep 2006
19:00

Boxscore

| Ireland | 76–70 | Cyprus |
Scoring by quarter: 16–26, 22–18, 25–10, 13–16
| Pts: Burke 20; Rebs: Burke 12; Asts: Conlon 8 | | Pts: Anastasiadis 18; Rebs: Anastasiadis 6 Asts: Anastasiadis, Kaskiris 3 |

National Basketball Arena, Dublin
Referees: Jose Magalhaes (POR), Martijn De Vries (NED)

16 Sep 2006
21:00

Boxscore

| Romania | 68–59 | Switzerland |
Scoring by quarter: 16–16, 21–10, 14–12, 17–21
| Pts: Burlacu 23; Rebs: Stanescu 14; Asts: Helcioiu, Kabengele Kalala 3 | | Pts: K. Sefolosha 17; Rebs: K. Sefolosha 11; Asts: Jaquier 3 |

Horia Demian Sports Hall, Cluj-Napoca
Attendance: 2,000
Referees: Yaron Zarif (ISR), Rafael Ganiev (RUS)

25 Aug 2007
19:00

Boxscore

| Cyprus | 65–68 | Romania |
Scoring by quarter: 20–17, 20–13, 8–22, 17–16
| Pts: Roundy 20; Rebs: Trisokkas 14; Asts: Koronides 4 | | Pts: Popescu 22; Rebs: Stanescu 11; Asts: Popescu 3 |

Arena of Keravnos Keo, Strovolos/Nicosia
Referees: Marin Mehandjiev (BUL), Igor Mitrovski (MKD)

25 Aug 2007
19:00

Boxscore

| Ireland | 58–86 | Switzerland |
Scoring by quarter: 6–23, 14–13, 13–24, 25–26
| Pts: Cummins 11; Rebs: O'Reilly, Grace 7 Asts: Bree 2 | | Pts: T. Sefolosha 23; Rebs: T. Sefolosha 7 Asts: T. Sefolosha 6 |

National Basketball Arena, Dublin
Referees: Miguel Angel Perez Niz (ESP), Joseph Bissang (FRA)

1 Sep 2007
17:30

Boxscore

| Switzerland | 76–67 | Cyprus |
Scoring by quarter: 16–9, 14–13, 17–20, 29–25
| Pts: T. Sefolosha 21; Rebs: T. Sefolosha 11; Asts: T. Sefolosha 5 | | Pts: Koronides, Trisokkas 16; Rebs: Roundy 9 Asts: Koronides 8 |

Saalsporthalle Zürich, Zürich
Attendance: 1,700
Referees: Marco Giansanti (ITA), Gordon Barbara (MLT)

1 Sep 2007
18:30

Boxscore

| Romania | 64–54 | Ireland |
Scoring by quarter: 17–12, 13–16, 18–10, 16–16
| Pts: Stanescu 12; Rebs: Stanescu 14; Asts: Helcioiu, Kabengele Kalala 2 | | Pts: Grace 12; Rebs: Naughton 11; Asts: Naughton 2 |

Arena of CSU, Sibiu
Attendance: 1,500
Referees: Nikolaos Papadimitriou (GRE), Sergiy Chaykovskyy (UKR)

5 Sep 2007
19:00

Boxscore

| Cyprus | 78–73 | Ireland |
Scoring by quarter: 13–15, 16–22, 31–17, 18–19
| Pts: Koronides 23; Rebs: Roundy 9 Asts: Koronides 4 | | Pts: Grace 22; Rebs: Grace 10; Asts: Bree 3 |

Arena of Keravnos Keo, Strovolos/Nicosia
Referees: Yaron Zarif (ISR), Zlatin Karanikolov (BUL)

5 Sep 2007
20:15

Boxscore

| Switzerland | 65–51 | Romania |
Scoring by quarter: 15–13, 19–10, 18–18, 13–10
| Pts: T. Sefolosha 25; Rebs: T. Sefolosha 7 Asts: T. Sefolosha 6 | | Pts: Stanescu 19; Rebs: Stanescu 11; Asts: Helcioiu 5 |

Saalsporthalle Zürich, Zürich
Attendance: 1,750
Referees: Marcello Reatto (ITA), Alfred Jovovic (CRO)

=== Group B ===
| Team | Pld | W | L | PF | PA | PD | Pts | Tie |
|---|---|---|---|---|---|---|---|---|
| Great Britain | 8 | 6 | 2 | 618 | 495 | +123 | 14 | |
| Netherlands | 8 | 5 | 3 | 590 | 540 | +50 | 13 | 2–0 |
| Belarus | 8 | 5 | 3 | 575 | 547 | +28 | 13 | 0–2 |
| Slovakia | 8 | 4 | 4 | 589 | 593 | −4 | 12 | |
| Albania | 8 | 0 | 8 | 534 | 731 | −197 | 8 | |

Rules=1) Points; 2) Head-to-head results; 3) Points difference; 4) Points scored.

2 Sep 2006
17:00

Boxscore

| Slovakia | 73–62 | Great Britain |
Scoring by quarter: 16–13, 13–16, 16–14, 28–19
| Pts: Toya 17; Rebs: Novák 12; Asts: Novák 4 | | Pts: Williams 10; Rebs: Haslam 6 Asts: Reinking 3 |

Sport Hall, Spišská Nová Ves
Attendance: 1,000
Referees: Branko Jovanovic (SRB), Robert Paulik (CZE)

3 Sep 2006
17:00

Boxscore

| Belarus | 61–74 | Netherlands |
Scoring by quarter: 7–15, 14–15, 23–21, 17–23
| Pts: Meshcharakou 17; Rebs: Meshcharakou 8 Asts: Meshcharakou 3 | | Pts: Akerboom, Van Paassen 19; Rebs: Van Paassen 9 Asts: Meijer, Slagter, Van Paassen 2 |

Arena of RTI Minsk, Minsk
Attendance: 2,200
Referees: Aleksander Gorshkov (RUS), Martynas Gudas (LTU)

6 Sep 2006
18:00

Boxscore

| Albania | 73–78 | Belarus |
Scoring by quarter: 17–22, 22–20, 15–26, 19–10
| Pts: Kasmi 20; Rebs: Bilali 5 Asts: Bilali 3 | | Pts: Ulyanko 16; Rebs: Meshcharakou 6 Asts: Kuzmin 4 |

Palace Spot R.Ngjala, Durrës
Referees: Igor Mitrovski (MKD), Charalampos Karakatsounis (GRE)

6 Sep 2006
19:30

Boxscore

| Netherlands | 71–63 | Slovakia |
Scoring by quarter: 24–17, 22–17, 10–16, 15–13
| Pts: Van Paassen 18; Rebs: Meijer, Van Paassen 8 Asts: Harris, Meijer 3 | | Pts: Gavel 21; Rebs: Novák 8 Asts: Gavel 4 |

MartiniPlaza, Groningen
Attendance: 2,000
Referees: Ronny Denis (BEL), David Chambon (FRA)

9 Sep 2006
17:00

Boxscore

| Slovakia | 101–88 | Albania |
Scoring by quarter: 26–26, 27–17, 24–23, 24–22
| Pts: Gavel 27; Rebs: Svitek, Novák 7 Asts: Gavel 5 | | Pts: Shima 23; Rebs: Mitku 6 Asts: Bilali 3 |

Sport Hall, Spišská Nová Ves
Attendance: 1,000
Referees: Istvàn Valovics (HUN), Miroslav Macela (CZE)

9 Sep 2006
19:00

Boxscore

| Great Britain | 63–39 | Netherlands |
Scoring by quarter: 18–8, 20–14, 14–14, 11–3
| Pts: Joseph 15; Rebs: Sullivan 12; Asts: Hansell 3 | | Pts: Van Paassen 8 Rebs: Harris 6 Asts: Jansen 3 |

Meadowbank Sport Centre, Edinburgh
Attendance: 1,300
Referees: Tomasz Kudlicki (POL), Regis Bardera (FRA)

13 Sep 2006
18:00

Boxscore

| Albania | 69–72 (OT) | Great Britain |
Scoring by quarter: 11–16, 21–17, 17–13, 13–16, Overtime: 7–10
| Pts: Kasmi 17; Rebs: Shima 12; Asts: Bilali 4 | | Pts: Huggins 20; Rebs: Huggins 11; Asts: Hansell, Huggins 2 |

Palace Spot R.Ngjala, Durrës
Referees: Marjan Micevski (MKD), Georgios Tanatzis (GRE)

13 Sep 2006
19:00

Boxscore

| Belarus | 82–59 | Slovakia |
Scoring by quarter: 21–13, 22–16, 13–10, 26–20
| Pts: Korshuk 19; Rebs: Meshcharakou 9 Asts: Charko 5 | | Pts: Toya 18; Rebs: Svitek 9 Asts: Toya 4 |

Arena of RTI Minsk, Minsk
Attendance: 2,800
Referees: Maxim Kolychev (RUS), Gabriel Roceanu (ROU)

16 Sep 2006
19:00

Boxscore

| Great Britain | 68–69 | Belarus |
Scoring by quarter: 17–24, 15–10, 17–19, 19–16
| Pts: Sullivan 18; Rebs: Sullivan 7 Asts: Sullivan 6 | | Pts: Ulyanko 17; Rebs: Meshcharakou, Koul 6 Asts: Meshcharakou, Kuzmin, Kudrautsau 3 |

Hallam FM Arena Sheffield, Sheffield
Referees: Atso Matsalu (EST), Sérgio Silva (POR)

16 Sep 2006
19:30

Boxscore

| Netherlands | 94–55 | Albania |
Scoring by quarter: 26–6, 27–24, 15–8, 26–17
| Pts: Van Paassen 21; Rebs: Van Paassen 9 Asts: Slagter 5 | | Pts: Saptahovic 16; Rebs: Kasmi 8 Asts: Kacori, Kasmi, Shima 1 |

Sporthal De Horstacker, Nijmegen
Referees: Bernard Vassallo (MLT), Fabrizio Pizio (SUI)

19 Aug 2007
13:30

Boxscore

| Netherlands | 77–72 | Belarus |
Scoring by quarter: 19–34, 19–12, 16–14, 23–12
| Pts: Elson 21; Rebs: Van Paassen 8 Asts: Krieger 5 | | Pts: Veremeenko 23; Rebs: Kuzmin 8 Asts: Kuzmin 8 |

Topsportcentrum, Almere
Attendance: 2,500
Referees: Sigmundur Herbertsson (ISL), Regis Bardera (FRA)

21 Aug 2007
19:30

Boxscore

| Great Britain | 77–52 | Slovakia |
Scoring by quarter: 19–14, 20–8, 16–15, 22–15
| Pts: Deng 21; Rebs: Deng 10; Asts: Lenzly, Deng, Sullivan, Huggins, Betts 2 | | Pts: R. Rancik 14; Rebs: R. Rancik 4 Asts: Gavlák 2 |

NIA Birmingham, Birmingham
Referees: Vicente Bulto (ESP), Ronny Denis (BEL)

25 Aug 2007
17:00

Boxscore

| Belarus | 87–45 | Albania |
Scoring by quarter: 19–7, 22–17, 22–10, 24–11
| Pts: Ulyanko 15; Rebs: Koul 9 Asts: Kuzmin, Charko 4 | | Pts: Kasmi 14; Rebs: Hysenagolli 9 Asts: Kasmi 2 |

Palace of Sports, Minsk
Attendance: 2,180
Referees: Sergey Mikhaylov (RUS), Tanel Suslov (EST)

25 Aug 2007
19:30

Boxscore

| Slovakia | 80–75 | Netherlands |
Scoring by quarter: 13–16, 27–22, 15–22, 25–15
| Pts: R. Rancik 31; Rebs: R. Rancik 11; Asts: Gavlák 3 | | Pts: Elson 28; Rebs: Elson 15; Asts: Krieger, Van Paassen, Elson 3 |

SH NA Vystavisku, Lučenec
Attendance: 1,500
Referees: Peter Bodnar (HUN), Damir Javor (SLO)

29 Aug 2007
19:30

Boxscore

| Netherlands | 64–83 | Great Britain |
Scoring by quarter: 15–21, 15–22, 15–27, 19–13
| Pts: Akerboom 20; Rebs: Van Paassen 11; Asts: Jansen 4 | | Pts: Deng 27; Rebs: Haslam, Betts 6 Asts: Deng 3 |

Topsportcentrum, Almere
Referees: Peter Vigh (HUN), Antonio Cinde (ESP)

29 Aug 2007
20:00

Boxscore

| Albania | 63–93 | Slovakia |
Scoring by quarter: 18–27, 12–18, 15–24, 18–24
| Pts: Kasmi 18; Rebs: Shima 6 Asts: Shima 3 | | Pts: R. Rancik 19; Rebs: R. Rancik 10; Asts: Nuber 4 |

Arena of KS Flamurtari, Vlorë
Attendance: 1,000
Referees: Petar Denkovski (MKD), Zdravko Rutesic (MNE)

1 Sep 2007
19:00

Boxscore

| Great Britain | 110–78 | Albania |
Scoring by quarter: 29–16, 31–24, 25–18, 25–20
| Pts: Archibald 21; Rebs: Deng, Archibald 7 Asts: Deng 9 | | Pts: Bilali 24; Rebs: Kasmi 7 Asts: Kasmi 3 |

Meadowbank Sport Centre, Edinburgh
Referees: Fernando Rocha (POR), Carmelo Lo Guzzo (ITA)

1 Sep 2007
19:30

Boxscore

| Slovakia | 68–75 | Belarus |
Scoring by quarter: 17–27, 24–13, 12–17, 15–18
| Pts: Lesko 21; Rebs: Pandula 8 Asts: Micka, Gavlák, Nuber 3 | | Pts: Kudrautsau 17; Rebs: Veremeenko 12; Asts: Kuzmin, Veremeenko 3 |

Aréna Poprad, Poprad
Attendance: 2,000
Referees: Tomasz Kudlicki (POL), Tamas Földhazi (HUN)

5 Sep 2007
19:00

Boxscore

| Belarus | 51–83 | Great Britain |
Scoring by quarter: 13–24, 17–14, 16–22, 5–23
| Pts: Veremeenko 13; Rebs: Veremeenko 11; Asts: Ulyanko, Veremeenko 2 | | Pts: Deng 27; Rebs: Betts 10; Asts: Deng 5 |

Palace of Sports, Minsk
Attendance: 3,800
Referees: Konstantinos Koromilas (GRE), Tomasz Trewicki (POL)

5 Sep 2007
20:00

Boxscore

| Albania | 63–96 | Netherlands |
Scoring by quarter: 16–23, 0–0, 32–53, 15–20
| Pts: Kasmi, Bilali 15; Rebs: Kasmi, Bilali 6 Asts: Bilali 2 | | Pts: Akerboom, Slagter, Brigitha 13; Rebs: Hilliman 12; Asts: Theeuwkens 4 |

Arena of KS Flamurtari, Vlore
Attendance: 1,000
Referees: Nikola Lepetic (MNE), Ioannis Foufis (GRE)

=== Group C ===
| Team | Pld | W | L | PF | PA | PD | Pts |
|---|---|---|---|---|---|---|---|
| Finland | 8 | 7 | 1 | 730 | 535 | +195 | 15 |
| Georgia | 8 | 6 | 2 | 640 | 549 | +91 | 14 |
| Iceland | 8 | 4 | 4 | 635 | 644 | −9 | 12 |
| Austria | 8 | 3 | 5 | 555 | 590 | −35 | 11 |
| Luxembourg | 8 | 0 | 8 | 473 | 715 | −242 | 8 |

3 Sep 2006
16:00

Boxscore

| Finland | 87–50 | Austria |
Scoring by quarter: 26–11, 18–25, 26–9, 17–5
| Pts: Möttölä 17; Rebs: Möttölä 6 Asts: Rannikko 4 | | Pts: Ortner 16; Rebs: Ortner 10; Asts: Woschank 2 |

Helsinki Ice Stadium, Helsinki
Attendance: 2,122
Referees: Atso Matsalu (EST), Andris Aunkrogers (LAT)

3 Sep 2006
19:00

Boxscore

| Georgia | 86–44 | Luxembourg |
Scoring by quarter: 20–15, 27–11, 17–13, 22–5
| Pts: Tsintsadze 15; Rebs: Pachulia, Natsvlishvili, Sanikidze 5 Asts: Gamqrelidze 6 | | Pts: M. Rajniak 19; Rebs: Jones 11; Asts: Schumacher 9 |

Tbilisi Sports Palace, Tbilisi
Attendance: 10,000
Referees: Ersan Kartal (TUR)

6 Sep 2006
20:00

Boxscore

| Iceland | 86–93 | Finland |
Scoring by quarter: 31–21, 26–25, 10–25, 19–22
| Pts: Birmingham 20; Rebs: Baeringsson 15; Asts: Baeringsson 4 | | Pts: Möttölä 25; Rebs: Möttölä 15; Asts: Rannikko 13 |

Laugardalshöll, Reykjavík
Referees: Ian Pollard (ENG), Jonas Bille (DEN)

6 Sep 2006
20:20

Boxscore

| Austria | 63–68 | Georgia |
Scoring by quarter: 19–13, 22–13, 15–24, 7–18
| Pts: Ortner 14; Rebs: Ortner 8 Asts: Jandl, Woschank, Volcic 3 | | Pts: Pachulia 24; Rebs: Pachulia 7 Asts: Ellis Junior 5 |

Arena of Oberwart Gunners, Oberwart
Referees: Philippe Leemann (SUI), Carmelo Lo Guzzo (ITA)

9 Sep 2006
19:00

Boxscore

| Georgia | 80–65 | Iceland |
Scoring by quarter: 19–13, 19–14, 20–19, 22–19
| Pts: Pachulia 21; Rebs: Pachulia 12; Asts: Gamqrelidze 3 | | Pts: Birmingham 22; Rebs: Baeringsson 7 Asts: Birmingham 3 |

Tbilisi Sports Palace, Tbilisi
Attendance: 10,000
Referees: Borys Shulga (UKR), Sergey Krug (RUS)

9 Sep 2006
20:30

Boxscore

| Luxembourg | 62–64 | Austria |
Scoring by quarter: 22–18, 16–12, 19–10, 5–24
| Pts: Schumacher 19; Rebs: Jones 16; Asts: Schumacher, M. Rajniak 1 | | Pts: Volcic 19; Rebs: Schreiner, Helmigk 6 Asts: Volcic 3 |

Arena of Racing Club, Luxembourg City
Referees: Werner Huybreghs (BEL), Stephen Ellis (ENG)

13 Sep 2006
18:15

Boxscore

| Finland | 91–81 | Georgia |
Scoring by quarter: 29–15, 25–21, 14–18, 23–27
| Pts: Virtanen 27; Rebs: Kotti 10; Asts: Kotti, Möttölä, Rannikko 3 | | Pts: Pachulia 36; Rebs: Pachulia 13; Asts: Gamqrelidze 3 |

Helsinki Ice Stadium, Helsinki
Attendance: 1,850
Referees: Markus Grievink (GER), Joakim Forsberg (SWE)

13 Sep 2006
20:00

Boxscore

| Iceland | 98–76 | Luxembourg |
Scoring by quarter: 25–12, 25–19, 23–29, 25–16
| Pts: Birmingham 24; Rebs: Baeringsson 10; Asts: Sigurdarson 8 | | Pts: M. Rajniak, Jones 14; Rebs: Jones 13; Asts: Schumacher 5 |

Arena of IBK Keflavik, Keflavík
Attendance: 1,000
Referees: Nicolaas Zwiep (NED), Rune Ressel Larsen (DEN)

16 Sep 2006
20:20

Boxscore

| Austria | 85–64 | Iceland |
Scoring by quarter: 25–21, 17–19, 11–10, 32–14
| Pts: Ortner 32; Rebs: Ortner 13; Asts: Hütter 4 | | Pts: L. Gunnarsson 14; Rebs: Birmingham 9 Asts: F. Olafsson 2 |

Arena of BK Klosterneuburg, Klosterneuburg
Referees: Nikolaos Papadimitriou (GRE), Dariusz Szczerba (POL)

16 Sep 2006
20:30

Boxscore

| Luxembourg | 53–111 | Finland |
Scoring by quarter: 12–28, 17–35, 11–18, 13–30
| Pts: Schumacher 20; Rebs: Jones 9 Asts: Melchior, Delgado Ferreira, Jones 2 | | Pts: Koponen 19; Rebs: Kotti 12; Asts: Koponen 7 |

Arena of Racing Club, Luxembourg City
Referees: Robert Paulik (CZE), Tamas Földhazi (HUN)

21 Aug 2007
19:30

Boxscore

| Luxembourg | 60–88 | Georgia |
Scoring by quarter: 8–26, 18–24, 21–19, 13–19
| Pts: M. Rajniak 19; Rebs: M. Rajniak 7 Asts: Schumacher, Schartz 3 | | Pts: Pachulia, Markoishvili 16; Rebs: Sanikidze 6 Asts: Markoishvili, Sanikidze 2 |

Centre National Sportif & Culturel d'Coque, Luxembourg City
Attendance: 2,500
Referees: Eric Bertrand (SUI), Miroslav Tomov (BUL)

21 Aug 2007
20:20

Boxscore

| Austria | 63–87 | Finland |
Scoring by quarter: 14–21, 25–26, 17–16, 7–24
| Pts: Ortner 15; Rebs: Lamesic 9 Asts: Ortner 4 | | Pts: Rannikko 29; Rebs: Kotti 9 Asts: Koponen 6 |

Arena of Volksbank Gmunden, Gmunden
Referees: Mauro Pozzana (ITA), Peter Papp (HUN)

25 Aug 2007
18:00

Boxscore

| Finland | 85–66 | Iceland |
Scoring by quarter: 22–15, 22–17, 17–21, 24–13
| Pts: Huff 16; Rebs: Kotti 11; Asts: Virtanen 5 | | Pts: Birmingham 16; Rebs: M. Gunnarsson, F. Stefánsson, Vilbergsson, L. Gunnarsson, Magnússon, F. Olafsson 3 Asts: Sigurdarson 5 |

Arena of Pussihukat, Vantaa
Attendance: 1,100
Referees: Kestutis Pilipauskas (LTU), Dariusz Lenczowski (POL)

25 Aug 2007
19:00

Boxscore

| Georgia | 85–74 | Austria |
Scoring by quarter: 21–22, 21–15, 24–19, 19–18
| Pts: Pachulia 25; Rebs: Sanikidze 9 Asts: Pachulia, Sanikidze, Ellis Junior 3 | | Pts: Kollik 19; Rebs: Ortner 7 Asts: Woschank 4 |

Tbilisi Sports Palace, Tbilisi
Attendance: 3,000
Referees: Borys Shulga (UKR), Aytug Ekti (TUR)

29 Aug 2007
19:15

Boxscore

| Iceland | 76–75 | Georgia |
Scoring by quarter: 18–23, 18–15, 16–17, 24–20
| Pts: L. Gunnarsson 17; Rebs: Vilbergsson 15; Asts: Sigurdarson 5 | | Pts: Ellis Junior 17; Rebs: Pachulia 11; Asts: Ellis Junior 5 |

Laugardalshöll, Reykjavík
Attendance: 1,450
Referees: Nicolas Maestre (FRA), Haydn Jones (GBR)

29 Aug 2007
20:20

Boxscore

| Austria | 79–46 | Luxembourg |
Scoring by quarter: 11–14, 21–10, 32–7, 15–15
| Pts: Mayer 16; Rebs: Mayer 11; Asts: Schreiner, Ortner, Mayer 4 | | Pts: M. Rajniak 14; Rebs: Jones 13; Asts: M. Rajniak 3 |

Arena of Volksbank Gmunden, Gmunden
Referees: Miroslav Macela (CZE), Matej Spendl (SLO)

1 Sep 2007
20:30

Boxscore

| Luxembourg | 73–89 | Iceland |
Scoring by quarter: 25–15, 24–21, 14–31, 10–22
| Pts: M. Rajniak 21; Rebs: Delgado Almeida Rosario 7 Asts: Delgado Almeida Rosario 4 | | Pts: L. Gunnarsson 21; Rebs: F. Olafsson 9 Asts: M. Gunnarsson, Magnússon 3 |

Centre National Sportif & Culturel d'Coque, Luxembourg City
Referees: Fabrizio Pizio (SUI), Marko Vuckovic (SLO)

2 Sep 2007
19:00

Boxscore

| Georgia | 77–76 | Finland |
Scoring by quarter: 26–25, 21–20, 19–19, 11–12
| Pts: Ellis Junior 17; Rebs: Pachulia 13; Asts: Pachulia 5 | | Pts: Rannikko 16; Rebs: Nikkilä 8 Asts: Virtanen 4 |

Tbilisi Sports Palace, Tbilisi
Attendance: 3,500
Referees: Engin Kennerman (TUR), Charalampos Karakatsounis (GRE)

5 Sep 2007
19:00

Boxscore

| Finland | 100–59 | Luxembourg |
Scoring by quarter: 28–16, 22–13, 29–17, 21–13
| Pts: Virtanen 17; Rebs: Virtanen 5 Asts: Virtanen 4 | | Pts: M. Rajniak 12; Rebs: Jones 5 Asts: P. Rajniak, M. Rajniak 2 |

Arena of Pussihukat, Vantaa
Attendance: 1,154
Referees: Atso Matsalu (EST), Daniel Berler (SWE)

5 Sep 2007
19:15

Boxscore

| Iceland | 91–77 | Austria |
Scoring by quarter: 13–23, 26–18, 23–16, 29–20
| Pts: Sigurdarson 21; Rebs: F. Olafsson 8 Asts: Sigurdarson 10 | | Pts: Hütter 20; Rebs: Ortner 12; Asts: Hütter, Woschank 8 |

Laugardalshöll, Reykjavík
Attendance: 1,373
Referees: Lars Klaar (SWE), Neil Wilkinson (ENG)

=== Best Runner-Up ===
| Team | PCT. | W | L | PF | PA | Diff | Group |
|---|---|---|---|---|---|---|---|
| Romania | 0.833 | 5 | 1 | 411 | 369 | +42 | A |
| Georgia | 0.750 | 6 | 2 | 640 | 549 | +91 | C |
| Netherlands | 0.625 | 5 | 3 | 590 | 540 | +50 | B |

== Promotional Phase ==
11 September 2007
18:30

Game 1

| Romania | 83–76 | Finland |
Scoring by quarter: 21–15, 23–22, 23–17, 16–22
| Pts: Helcioiu 18; Rebs: Popescu 9 Asts: Helcioiu, Stanescu, Kalala 4 | | Pts: Rannikko 29; Rebs: Matinen 8 Asts: Rannikko 4 |

Sala Sporturilor City Arena, Târgu Mureș, Romania
Attendance: 2,000
Referees: Ivan Zachara (CZE), Marcin Kowalski (POL), Fabien Conderanne (FRA)

11 September 2007
19:30

Game 1

| Great Britain | 74–41 | Switzerland |
Scoring by quarter: 21–11, 11–7, 23–8, 19–15
| Pts: Deng 31; Rebs: Deng 12; Asts: Midgley, Deng 4 | | Pts: Sefolosha 21; Rebs: Sefolosha 9 Asts: Sefolosha, Vogt, Stockalper 1 |

Sheffield Arena, Sheffield, Great Britain
Attendance: 1,500
Referees: Petr Sudek (SVK), Apostolos Kalpakas (SWE), Carlos Mateus (FRA)

15 September 2007
18:00

Game 2

| Finland | 111–61 | Romania |
Scoring by quarter: 30–12, 27–13, 33–11, 21–25
| Pts: Virtanen 23; Rebs: Muurinen 8 Asts: Muurinen, Rannikko, Koponen 3 | | Pts: Stanescu 20; Rebs: Burlacu 10; Asts: Burlacu, Helcioiu 3 |
Finland won 187–144, and advanced to Eurobasket 2009 Division A

Arena of Pussihukat, Vantaa, Finland
Attendance: 2,760
Referees: Romualdas Brazauskas (LTU), Boris Schmidt (GER), Juris Kokainis (LAT)

15 September 2007
15:15

Game 2

| Switzerland | 78–89 | Great Britain |
Scoring by quarter: 18–23, 20–23, 21–21, 19–22
| Pts: Sefolosha 17; Rebs: Stockalper 4 Asts: Sefolosha 9 | | Pts: Archibald 23; Rebs: Archibald, Betts 6 Asts: Midgley 4 |
Great Britain won 163–119, and advanced to Eurobasket 2009 Division A

Arena of Geneve Basket, Genèva, Switzerland
Attendance: 1,750
Referees: Christos Christodoulou (GRE), Carmelo Lo Guzzo (ITA), Damir Javor (SLO)

== Statistical leaders ==
Points

| Rank | Name | G | Pts | PPG |
|---|---|---|---|---|
| 1 | (United Kingdom) Luol Deng | 6 | 147 | 24.5 |
| 2 | (Switzerland) Thabo Sefolosha | 5 | 107 | 21.4 |
| 3 | (Georgia (country)) Zaza Pachulia | 8 | 159 | 19.9 |
| 4 | (Austria) Benjamin Ortner | 7 | 128 | 18.3 |
| 5 | (Albania) Sokol Kasmi | 7 | 121 | 17.3 |

Rebounds

| Rank | Name | G | Rbs | RPG |
|---|---|---|---|---|
| 1 | (Romania) Virgil Stanescu | 8 | 77 | 9.6 |
| 2 | (Austria) Benjamin Ortner | 7 | 66 | 9.4 |
| 3 | (Georgia (country)) Zaza Pachulia | 8 | 71 | 8.9 |
| 4 | (Luxembourg) Alvin Jones | 8 | 71 | 8.9 |
| 5 | (Netherlands) Peter van Paassen | 8 | 63 | 7.9 |

Assists

| Rank | Name | G | Asts | APG |
|---|---|---|---|---|
| 1 | (Switzerland) Thabo Sefolosha | 5 | 27 | 5.4 |
| 2 | (United Kingdom) Luol Deng | 6 | 26 | 4.3 |
| 3 | (Iceland) Jakob Sigurðarson | 8 | 34 | 4.3 |
| 4 | (Finland) Teemu Rannikko | 9 | 36 | 4.0 |
| 5 | (Austria) Armin Woschank | 8 | 26 | 3.3 |
