= FIBA EuroBasket 2011 Division B =

The FIBA EuroBasket Division B was the second-ranked tier of the bi-annual FIBA EuroBasket competition. All the teams of this tournament qualified for the FIBA EuroBasket 2013 qualification.

This was the last FIBA EuroBasket Division B tournament played.

== Group Phase ==
=== Group A ===
Team	P	W	L	PF	PA	Diff
Estonia	6	4	2	515	447	+68
Netherlands	6	4	2	479	418	+61
Austria	6	4	2	472	441	+31
Luxembourg	6	0	6	347	491	−144

14 August 2010
19:30

Report

Luxembourg	73–94	Netherlands
Scoring by quarter: 20–26, 17-17, 21–26, 15–25
Pts: Rajniak 19; Rebs: Picard 8 Asts: Schumacher, Picard 2		Pts: Norel 34; Rebs: Norel 11; Asts: Defares 6

Luxembourg
Attendance: 200
Referees: M Reiter (GER), R Hickman (ENG), P Coelho (POR)

14 August 2010
20:20

Report

Austria	93–90 (OT)	Estonia
Scoring by quarter: 23–18, 23–22, 13–20, 26–25, Overtime: 8–5
Pts: Detrick 27; Rebs: Mahalbasić 10; Asts: Ochsenhofer 5		Pts: Talts 21; Rebs: Kangur 6 Asts: Sokk 5

Vienna
Attendance: 350
Referees: M Giansanti (ITA), M Juras (SRB), T Lukac (SVK)

17 August 2010
19:20

Report

Estonia	93–69	Luxembourg
Scoring by quarter: 21–12, 12–20, 31–14, 29–23
Pts: Toome 18; Rebs: Kangur 12; Asts: Veideman 3		Pts: Picard 21; Rebs: Picard 12; Asts: four players 1

Tallinn
Attendance: 2600
Referees: M Vecerskis (LTU), F Pizio (SUI), A Aunkrogers (LAT)

17 August 2010
20:00

Report

Netherlands	63–60	Austria
Scoring by quarter: 16–22, 15–22, 12–6, 20–10
Pts: Norel 25; Rebs: Norel 14; Asts: Defares 4		Pts: Mahalbasić 18; Rebs: Mahalbasić 11; Asts: Detrick 6

Almere
Attendance: 1600
Referees: L Sharro (SWE), J Sarekoski (FIN), M Bayot (BEL)

21 August 2010
19:30

Report

Luxembourg	72–103	Austria
Scoring by quarter: 18–23, 15–24, 18–28, 21–28
Pts: Schumacher 26; Rebs: Schumacher 5 Asts: Rajniak 2		Pts: Detrick 19; Rebs: Mahalbasić 8 Asts: Ochsenhofer 4

Luxembourg
Attendance: 200
Referees: G Cicoria (ITA), J Bille (DEN), D Stasiev (MDA)

22 August 2010
15:00

Report

Netherlands	90–76	Estonia
Scoring by quarter: 29–19, 20–16, 19–18, 22–23
Pts: Norel 21; Rebs: Elson 9 Asts: Defares 6		Pts: Talts 22; Rebs: Talts 10; Asts: Kangur 4

Almere
Attendance: 1200
Referees: G Mattioli (ITA), P Mäntylä (FIN), S Silva (POR)

18 August 2011
19:15 EEST

Report

Estonia	73–56	Austria
Scoring by quarter: 21–9, 12–13, 22–21, 18–13
Pts: Talts 15; Rebs: Kangur 8 Asts: Arbet 4		Pts: Mahalbasić 19; Rebs: Mahalbasić 19; Asts: seven players 1

Saku Suurhall, Tallinn
Attendance: 4000
Referees: J Kokainis (LAT), K Williams (ENG), H Hilke (FIN)

18 August 2011
19:30 CEST

Report

Netherlands	96–54	Luxembourg
Scoring by quarter: 20–19, 25–10, 20–19, 31–6
Pts: Smeulders 22; Rebs: Smeulders 20; Asts: Elson, Slagter 5		Pts: Schumacher 14; Rebs: Birenbaum 5 Asts: Rajniak, Birenbaum 2

Almere
Attendance: 1000
Referees: MA Pérez (ESP), Z Zubak (SVK), T Vovk (CRO)

21 August 2011
20:30

Report

Austria	77–76	Netherlands
Scoring by quarter: 21–21, 17–19, 17–20, 22–16
Pts: Lamesic 19; Rebs: Mahalbasić 12; Asts: Lanegger 4		Pts: Elson 19; Rebs: Jansen 6 Asts: Slagter, Jansen 3

St. Pölten, Austria
Attendance: 800
Referees: I Dolinek (CZE), A Demetriou (CYP), A Aunkrogers (LAT)

21 August 2011
20:30

Report

Luxembourg	79–105	Estonia
Scoring by quarter: 20–27, 27–19, 11–32, 21–27
Pts: Picard 24; Rebs: Picard 7 Asts: Schumacher, Koster 3		Pts: Arbet 20; Rebs: Arbet 7 Asts: Saage 4

Luxembourg
Attendance: 213
Referees: M Giansanti (ITA), R Bardera (FRA), M Bayot (BEL)

24 August 2011
20:20

Report

Austria	83–67	Luxembourg
Scoring by quarter: 28–22, 21–20, 19–8, 15–17
Pts: Poiger, Klepeisz 16; Rebs: Mahalbasic 11; Asts: Schreiner 7		Pts: Rajniak 25; Rebs: Koster 4 Asts: Schumacher 4

St. Pölten, Austria
Attendance: 800
Referees: N Wilkinson (ENG), A Jersan (SLO), C Madinger (GER)

24 August 2011
20:30

Report

Estonia	78–60	Netherlands
Scoring by quarter: 16–17, 18–12, 23–16, 21–15
Pts: Arbet 28; Rebs: Kangur 11; Asts: Kangur 4		Pts: Gadzuric 18; Rebs: Gadzuric 11; Asts: Roijé 3

Tallinn
Attendance: 6000
Referees: O Latisevs (LAT), G Vitkauskas (LTU), S Herbertsson (ISL)

=== Group B ===
Team	P	W	L	PF	PA	Diff
Sweden	8	7	1	716	512	+204
Azerbaijan	8	5	3	646	686	−40
Belarus	8	4	4	644	610	+34
Romania	8	4	4	573	638	−65
Albania	8	0	8	569	702	−133

8 August 2010
16:00

Report

Sweden	75–66	Belarus
Scoring by quarter: 24–18, 10-10, 27–23, 14–15
Pts: Jerebko 22; Rebs: Jerebko 11; Asts: Mbemba 6		Pts: Kudrautsau 16; Rebs: Ulyanko, Lashkevich 6 Asts: four players 2

Norrköping
Attendance: 2200
Referees: D Chambon (FRA), R Lottermoser (GER), P Pastusiak (POL)

8 August 2010
20:30

Report

Albania	63–81	Azerbaijan
Scoring by quarter: 19–17, 14–31, 17–16, 13–17
Pts: Kuqo 17; Rebs: Kuqo, Hysenagolli 7 Asts: Karaj 6		Pts: Davis23; Rebs: Davis 11; Asts: Pashayev 5

Tirana
Attendance: 500
Referees: A Milojevik (MKD), G Barbara (MLT), V Sundic (MNE)

11 August 2010
16:35

Report

Romania	70–54	Sweden
Scoring by quarter: 19–14, 16–13, 20–15, 15–12
Pts: Moldoveanu, Nicoara 16; Rebs: Nicoara, Capusan 10; Asts: Mandache 6		Pts: Jerebko 19; Rebs: Jerebko 14; Asts: Mbemba 4

Cluj-Napoca
Attendance: 2000
Referees: B Mrdak (SRB), T Hordov (CRO), Z Yilmaz (TUR)

11 August 2010
19:00

Report

Belarus	94–76	Albania
Scoring by quarter: 26–29, 21–9, 13–20, 34–18
Pts: Ulyanko 19; Rebs: Parakhouski 8 Asts: Kudrautsau 4		Pts: Kuqo 24; Rebs: Hysenagolli 10; Asts: Kuqo 3

Minsk
Attendance: 1750
Referees: A Gorshkov (RUS), R Ponomarenko (UKR), J Sarekoski (FIN)

14 August 2010
19:00

Report

Azerbaijan	83–79	Belarus
Scoring by quarter: 32–20, 15–17, 18–13, 18–29
Pts: Davis 30; Rebs: Bashak13; Asts: Pashayev 5		Pts: Pustahvar 19; Rebs: Pustahvar 7 Asts: Kudrautsau 6

Baku
Attendance: 1600
Referees: M Maliszewski (POL), E Vetrov (RUS), D Berekashvili (GEO)

14 August 2010
20:30

Report

Albania	74–93	Romania
Scoring by quarter: 18–20, 26–18, 15–24, 15–31
Pts: Karaj 19; Rebs: three players 5 Asts: Karaj 3		Pts: Silvasan 17; Rebs: Nicoara 11; Asts: Mandache 3

Tirana
Attendance: 500
Referees: T Sahin (ITA), P Denkovski (MKD), T Vovk (CRO)

17 August 2010
18:00

Report

Romania	86–101	Azerbaijan
Scoring by quarter: 16–24, 29–23, 18–23, 23–31
Pts: Moldoveanu 23; Rebs: Nicoara 15; Asts: Silvasan 4		Pts: Bashak 28; Rebs: Bashak 10; Asts: Niftaliyev 8

Timișoara
Attendance: 1000
Referees: R Nuran (TUR), B Peltekov (BUL), Z Palla (HUN)

17 August 2010
19:00

Report

Sweden	111–64	Albania
Scoring by quarter: 29–16, 25–26, 32–13, 25–9
Pts: Jerebko 24; Rebs: Jerebko 14; Asts: Jerebko 7		Pts: Karaj 18; Rebs: Hysenagolli 8 Asts: Cuka 4

Norrköping
Attendance: 2000
Referees: M Gudas (LTU), T Trawicki (POL), B Peters (NED)

21 August 2010
17:00

Report

Belarus	79–80	Romania
Scoring by quarter: 16–19, 31–16, 8–18, 24–27
Pts: Ulyanko 17; Rebs: Lashkevich 9 Asts: Stiggers 6		Pts: Moldoveanu 16; Rebs: Nicoara 11; Asts: Mandache 6

Minsk
Attendance: 2000
Referees: J Janac (SVK), O Lucis (LAT), N Kolotil'shchikov (RUS)

21 August 2010
19:00

Report

Azerbaijan	73–101	Sweden
Scoring by quarter: 21–28, 20–13, 15–25, 17–35
Pts: Davis 27; Rebs: Davis, Rindin 7 Asts: Pashayev 6		Pts: Jerebko 35; Rebs: Jerebko 10; Asts: Kjellbom, Mbemba 5

Baku
Attendance: 1500
Referees: V Drabikovsky (UKR), I Demenkov (RUS), A Tobi (EST)

12 August 2011
19:00

Boxscore

Azerbaijan	99–86	Albania
Scoring by quarter: 31–20, 26–17, 24–20, 18–29
Pts: Nelson 23; Rebs: Nelson 10; Asts: Pashayev 9		Pts: Bushati 32; Rebs: Kuqo 14; Asts: Kuqo 3

Baku
Attendance: 1500
Referees: E Kennerman (TUR), Y Rainisch (ISR), V Tsekov (BUL)

12 August 2011
19:00

Boxscore

Belarus	77–86	Sweden
Scoring by quarter: 22–19, 12–21, 21–23, 22–23
Pts: Kudrautsau 13; Rebs: Parakhouski, Aliakseyeu 6 Asts: Charykau 5		Pts: Jeansson 19; Rebs: Saks 10; Asts: Mbemba 4

Minsk
Attendance: 1280
Referees: M Cmikiewicz (POL), S Mikhaylov (RUS), G Vitkauskas (LTU)

15 August 2011
19:00

Boxscore

Sweden	93–44	Romania
Scoring by quarter: 21–10, 17–11, 25–13, 30–10
Pts: Gaddefors 19; Rebs: Schreiber 5 Asts: Mbemba 6		Pts: Silvasan 14; Rebs: Silvasan 5 Asts: Silvasan, Paul 2

Norrköping
Attendance: 1518
Referees: L Lamonica (ITA), T Trawicki (POL), S Herbertsson (ISL)

15 August 2011
20:30

Boxscore

Albania	71–77	Belarus
Scoring by quarter: 26–23, 21–20, 11–7, 13–27
Pts: Kuqo 20; Rebs: Kuqo 8 Asts: Bushati 5		Pts: Ulyanko 14; Rebs: Aliakseyeu, Meshcharakou 7 Asts: Charykau 4

Tirana
Attendance: 300
Referees: Milan Mazic (SRB), Petros Papapetrou (GRE), Igor Mitrovski (MKD)

18 August 2011
19:00

Boxscore

Belarus	87–74	Azerbaijan
Scoring by quarter: 29–23,, 21–8, 12–23, 25–20
Pts: Kudrautsau 17; Rebs: Trastsinetski 9 Asts: Charykau 5		Pts: Nelson 22; Rebs: Nelson 11; Asts: Nelson 7

Minsk
Attendance: 1850
Referees: Anton Makhlin (RUS), Johannes Sarekoski (FIN), Marcin Kowalski (POL)

18 August 2011
17:30

Report

Romania	79–78	Albania
Scoring by quarter: 20–16, 12–23, 23–18, 15–21
Pts: Capusan 18; Rebs: Capusan 9 Asts: Tudor 7		Pts: Bushati 24; Rebs: Cuka 8 Asts: Aliaj, Cuka 2

Bucharest
Attendance: 300
Referees: P Anastopoulos (GRE), B Mrdak (SRB), P Denkovski (MKD)

21 August 2011
20:30

Boxscore

Albania	57–68	Sweden
Scoring by quarter: 22–16, 12–18, 12–25, 11–9
Pts: Kuqo 16; Rebs: Kuqo, Shima 8 Asts: Cuka 6		Pts: Pahlmblad 24; Rebs: Gaddefors 11; Asts: four players 3

Tirana
Attendance: 1000
Referees: M Jovcic (SRB), A Milojevik (MKD), N Kovacevic (GER)

21 August 2011
19:00

Boxscore

Azerbaijan	74–56	Romania
Scoring by quarter: 21–13, 12–20, 27–6, 14–17
Pts: Nelson 28; Rebs: Nelson 16; Asts: Nelson 6		Pts: Dimitrescu 19; Rebs: Jucan 7 Asts: Chetreanu 4

Baku
Attendance: 1500
Referees: Murat Biricik (TUR), Sergey Mikhaylov (RUS), Nikolaos Somos (GRE)

24 August 2011
17:30

Report

Romania	65–85	Belarus
Scoring by quarter: 18–19, 12–21, 19–30, 16–15
Pts: Dragusin 14; Rebs: Capusan 5 Asts: Silvasan 5		Pts: Kudrautsau 16; Rebs: three players 5 Asts: Kudrautsau 7

Cluj-Napoca
Attendance: 500
Referees: C Christodoulou (GRE), S Dozai (CRO), D Berekashvili (GEO)

24 August 2011
19:00

Boxscore

Sweden	128–61	Azerbaijan
Scoring by quarter: 29–18, 28–18, 30–13, 41–12
Pts: Gaddefors 27; Rebs: Lindqvist 9 Asts: Andreas Person 7		Pts: Bakhshiyev, Rindin 14; Rebs: Rindin 10; Asts: Pashayev 3

Norrköping
Attendance: 1524
Referees: J Zamojski (POL), P Van Den Heuvel (NED), O Lucis (LAT)

=== Group C ===
Team	P	W	L	PF	PA	Diff
Czech Republic	6	5	1	471	385	+86
Switzerland	6	4	2	426	390	+36
Slovakia	6	3	3	407	395	+12
Cyprus	6	0	6	335	469	−134

14 August 2010
18:00

Report

Cyprus	67–70	Switzerland
Scoring by quarter: 11–14, 16–18, 15-15, 25–23
Pts: Trisokkas 16; Rebs: Trisokkas 9 Asts: Koronides 5		Pts: Vogt 15; Rebs: Brunner 11; Asts: Louissaint, Petkovic 3

Nicosia
Attendance: 200
Referees: D Gologanov (BUL), Y Michaelly (ISR), M Serban (ROU)

14 August 2010
19:00

Report

Slovakia	60–65	Czech Republic
Scoring by quarter: 15–19, 18–15, 17–21, 10-10
Pts: Gavel 17; Rebs: three players 6 Asts: Szalay, Rancik 2		Pts: Benda 15; Rebs: Barton 9 Asts: Kotas, Barton 3

Prievidza
Attendance: 2000
Referees: G Ziemblicki (POL), T Földhazi (HUN), U Obrknezevic (SRB)

17 August 2010
18:00

Report

Czech Republic	93–50	Cyprus
Scoring by quarter: 23–12, 20–12, 29–12, 21–14
Pts: Slezak 17; Rebs: Benda 10; Asts: Carnecký 6		Pts: Trisokkas 13; Rebs: Trisokkas 7 Asts: Razis 6

Děčín
Attendance: 1200
Referees: B Shulga (UKR), D Lenczowski (POL), N Kovacevic (AUT)

17 August 2010
20:00

Report

Switzerland	52–60	Slovakia
Scoring by quarter: 20–17, 9–12, 17–11, 6–20
Pts: Vogt 15; Rebs: Brunner 15; Asts: Kazadi 5		Pts: Rancik 17; Rebs: Rancik 9 Asts: Gavel 9

Fribourg
Attendance: 1289
Referees: L Lamonica (ITA), A Glisic (SRB), C Santos (POR)

21 August 2010
17:30

Report

Switzerland	92–99 (OT)	Czech Republic
Scoring by quarter: 20-20, 25–27, 22–21, 20–19, Overtime: 5–12
Pts: Brunner 27; Rebs: Brunner 8 Asts: Petkovic 7		Pts: Benda 25; Rebs: Barton 8 Asts: Tóth 4

Fribourg
Attendance: 1300
Referees: A Jovovic (CRO), R Denis (BEL), J Forsberg (SWE)

21 August 2010
19:00

Report

Slovakia	85–58	Cyprus
Scoring by quarter: 18–13, 19–12, 19–11, 29–22
Pts: Rancik 19; Rebs: Rancik 6 Asts: Cervenka 3		Pts: Razis 16; Rebs: Trisokkas 6 Asts: five players 1

Pezinok
Referees: C Paternico (ITA), T Kudlicki (POL), P Ivashkov (BLR)

17 August 2011
18:30

Report

Czech Republic	76–69	Slovakia
Scoring by quarter: 23–15, 21–16, 22–18, 10–20
Pts: Bartoň 13; Rebs: Dygrýn 8 Asts: Čarnecký 8		Pts: Pandula 13; Rebs: Sýkora 8 Asts: Gavel 10

Děčín
Attendance: 1000
Referees: G Cerebuch (ITA), T Anzulovic (CRO), C Cziffra (HUN)

18 August 2011
20:00

Report

Switzerland	71–43	Cyprus
Scoring by quarter: 10–8, 17–10, 19–16, 25–9
Pts: Ramseier 12; Rebs: Sefolosha 8 Asts: Kazadi 6		Pts: Trisokkas 14; Rebs: Trisokkas 9 Asts: Kaskiris 2

Fribourg
Attendance: 2250
Referees: D Javor (SLO), R Geller (BEL), L Lopes (POR)

21 August 2011
18:00

Report

Slovakia	57–76	Switzerland
Scoring by quarter: 16–11, 12–15, 14–27, 15–23
Pts: Sedmák 16; Rebs: Pandula 8 Asts: Pandula 6		Pts: Mladjan, Brunner 16; Rebs: Brunner 16; Asts: Brunner 6

Levice
Attendance: 700
Referees: S Herceg (CRO), M Kowalski (POL), K Williams (ENG)

21 August 2011
19:30

Report

Cyprus	49–74	Czech Republic
Scoring by quarter: 18–13, 8–24, 8–16, 15–21
Pts: Trisokkas 14; Rebs: Trisokkas 6 Asts: Koronides 2		Pts: Bartoň, Kotas 13; Rebs: Bartoň 12; Asts: Kudláček 3

Nicosia
Attendance: 100
Referees: S Shemmesh (ISR), S Gontas (GRE), A Glisic (SRB)

24 August 2011
19:30

Report

Cyprus	68–76 (OT)	Slovakia
Scoring by quarter: 14–18, 22–9, 15–20, 11–15, Overtime: 6–14
Pts: Koronides 21; Rebs: Trisokkas 6 Asts: Koronides 4		Pts: Sedmák 18; Rebs: Sedmák 9 Asts: Marko 8

Nicosia
Attendance: 100
Referees: G Tanatzis (GRE), Y Rainisch (ISR), S Maricic (SRB)

24 August 2011
18:00

Report

Czech Republic	64–65	Switzerland
Scoring by quarter: 18–17, 15–18, 12–20, 19–10
Pts: Houska 16; Rebs: Pomikálek 8 Asts: four players 3		Pts: Stockalper 16; Rebs: Kazadi 6 Asts: three players 3

Děčín
Referees: P Taurino (ITA), S Herceg (CRO), M Maliszewski (POL)

== Statistical Leaders ==
Points

Rank	Name	G	Pts	PPG
1	(Azerbaijan) Charles Davis	4	104	26.0
2	(Sweden) Jonas Jerebko	4	100	25.0
3	(Albania) Franko Bushati	4	81	20.3
4	(Albania) Ermal Kuqo	7	136	19.4
5	(Sweden) Anton Gaddefors	4	72	18.0

Rebounds

Rank	Name	G	Pts	PPG
1	(Sweden) Jonas Jerebko	4	49	12.3
2	(Austria) Rasid Mahalbasić	6	71	11.8
3	(Romania) Titus Nicoara	4	47	11.8
4	(Switzerland) Greg Brunner	5	56	11.2
5	(Azerbaijan) Charles Davis	4	35	8.8

Assists

Rank	Name	G	Pts	PPG
1	(Azerbaijan) Zaur Pashayev	8	39	4.9
2	(Slovakia) Anton Gavel	4	19	4.8
3	(Belarus) Siarhei Charykau	4	19	4.8
4	(Sweden) Rudy Mbemba	7	30	4.3
5	(Sweden) Jonas Jerebko	4	17	4.3
