= Donnie McGrath =

American basketball player (born 1984)

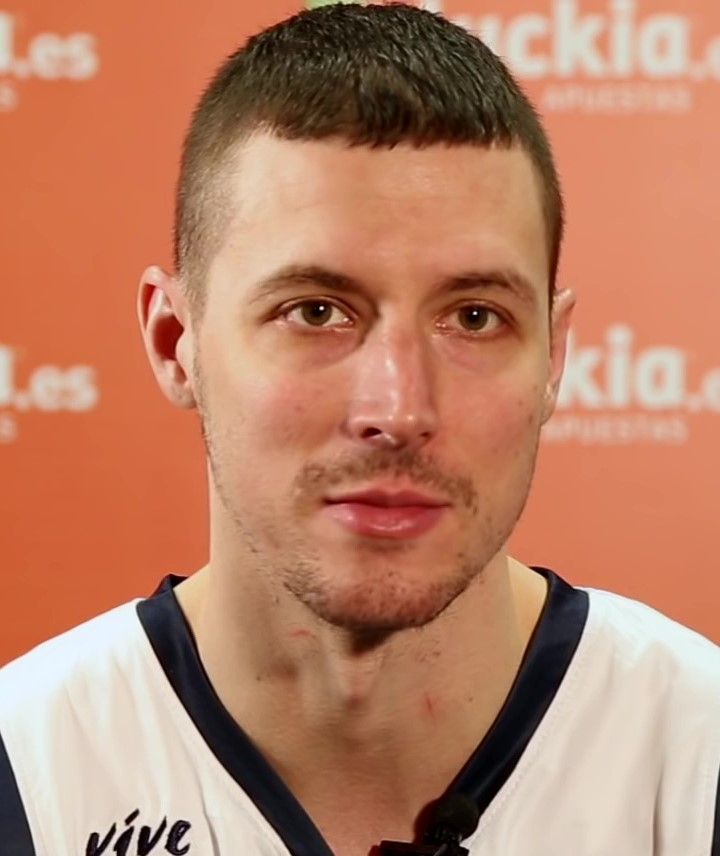
- McGrath in 2016

Personal information
- Born: May 7, 1984 (age 42) Mount Kisco, New York, U.S.
- Listed height: 6 ft 4 in (1.93 m)
- Listed weight: 198 lb (90 kg)

Career information
- High school: John F. Kennedy Catholic (Somers, New York)
- College: Providence (2002–2006)
- NBA draft: 2006: undrafted
- Playing career: 2006–2018
- Position: Point guard / shooting guard

Career history
- 2006–2007: Cantù
- 2007–2008: Virtus Bologna
- 2008–2009: Aigaleo
- 2009–2010: AEK Athens
- 2010: Cimberio Varese
- 2010–2011: PAOK Thessaloniki
- 2011: Cholet
- 2012: Teramo
- 2012: Scaligera Verona
- 2012–2013: PAOK Thessaloniki
- 2013: Žalgiris Kaunas
- 2013–2014: Spartak Saint Petersburg
- 2014: Anadolu Efes
- 2014–2015: Krasny Oktyabr
- 2015–2016: Obradoiro CAB
- 2016–2017: Long Island Nets
- 2017: AEK Athens
- 2017–2018: Real Betis
- 2018: Cagliari Dinamo Academy

Career highlights
- LKL champion (2013); Second-team All-Big East (2006); Big East All-Rookie Team (2003)

Donald Michael McGrath (born May 7, 1984) is an American former professional basketball player. He played college basketball at Providence College and on the Irish national basketball team after obtaining Irish citizenship.

== Early life ==
McGrath grew up in Westchester County, outside of New York City.

He starred at John F. Kennedy Catholic High School, in Somers, N.Y., where he played four seasons on varsity. During that time, the Gaels went 79–12, and won four league titles. He was an all-league first-team player all four seasons, and first-team all state his last two seasons. He finished his varsity career with a school-record 1,725 career points. He averaged 30.9 points, 7.6 assists, and 6.5 rebounds per game his senior year, and was named Westchester County Mr. Basketball.

McGrath grew up playing AAU in New York City, with renowned clubs New York Gauchos and New York Ravens, out of the Bronx, NY. He became a regular at street ball tournaments in the city, and earned himself several nicknames on the court. He was an all-star at the prestigious ABCD Camp, and he was ranked as a consensus Top 100 national player in the class of 2002. After being highly recruited, he decided to accept a scholarship to Providence College, to play in the Big East Conference.

== College career ==
McGrath launched his college basketball career at Providence, by being named to the Big East all-rookie team. He started all 32 of the Friars' games, and finished the season with 138 assists and just 76 turnovers, while averaging 9.1 points per game.

McGrath led the Friars in scoring (career-high average of 15.1 points per game), and 3-pointers (77) in his senior year (2005–06). He also earned second-team All-Big East honors in the first year of the expansion of the Big East into a 16-team power conference, which was considered the best in the country. He was also named NABC Second Team All-District 1. His average of 2.85 made 3-pointers per game, ranked seventh in the Big East.

During the season, he scored 16 points against Northeastern, on Dec. 20, 2005, to become the 37th Providence player to register 1,000 points in his college career. McGrath went 9-of-9 from 3-point range, against the University of Virginia, on Feb. 2, 2005, scoring 27 points, and adding seven assists and five rebounds. His 9-of-9 performance on 3-pointers was an NCAA Division I record for most 3-point field goals made in a game, without a miss, at that time.

McGrath ended his career at Providence, ranked number one in school history in minutes played (4,128), games started (117), and 3-pointers made (274), and 17th on the Friars' career scoring list, with 1,282 points.

== Professional career ==
After working out for several NBA teams, McGrath went undrafted in the 2006 NBA draft. He signed on to the New York Knicks' summer team to compete in the Las Vegas NBA Summer League. After suffering torn ligaments in his thumb, he was unable to play in any of the games.

McGrath then signed his first pro contract with Pallacanestro Cantù of the Italian LBA League. He then played the 2006–07 season with Cantù. After a successful year with Cantù, he played the 2007–08 season with the renowned Virtus Bologna, also of the LBA Italian League, and he also competed in the EuroLeague, for the first time. He averaged 7.6 points per game in the EuroLeague.

He signed with Egaleo of Greece's Basket League, for the 2008–09 season. He averaged 13.5 points per game in the Greek League, leading the team in scoring. For the 2009–10 season, he signed with Greek club AEK Athens, and he averaged 12.0 points per game with them in the Greek League. In December 2009, he moved to Cimberio Varese of the Italian LBA League, for the rest of the season.

In the 2010–11 season, he played with PAOK Thessaloniki of the Greek Basket League, and he also competed in the EuroCup. He averaged 9.3 points per game as the team's starting point guard in the Greek competition, and 8.8 points per game in the EuroCup competition. He was second on the team in assists in the EuroCup competition.

On December 30, 2011, McGrath joined the Italian club Teramo Basket, on a one-month contract, with an option for an extension until the end of the season. For the 2011–12 season, McGrath signed with the French club Cholet Basket, of the LNB Pro A league and the EuroCup. “They are one of the best French teams," McGrath told TheDailyWestchester.com. "They won the championship two years ago, and lost in the finals last season."

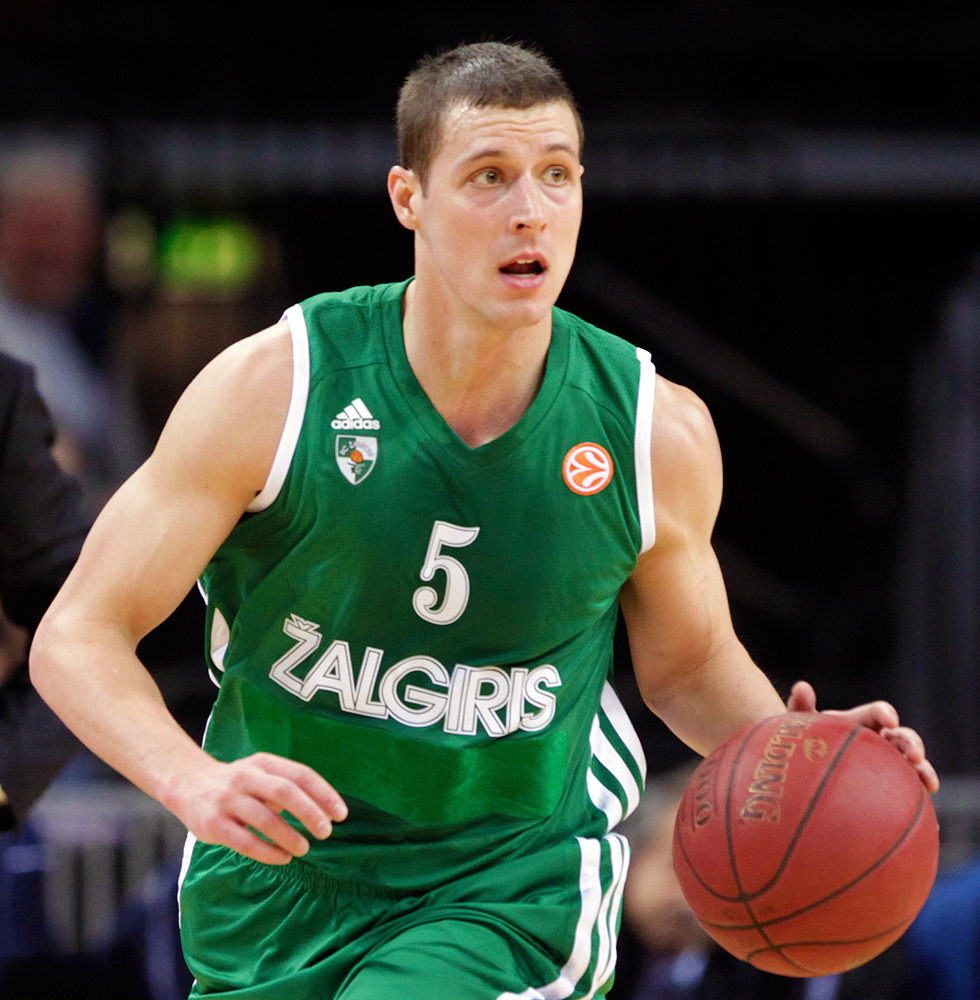
McGrath with Žalgiris in 2013.

On February 24, 2012, McGrath signed with Scaligera Basket Verona in Italy. On February 11, 2013, McGrath signed with the Lithuanian club Žalgiris Kaunas. On October 20, 2014, McGrath signed with the Turkish team Anadolu Efes. On December 31, 2014, he left Efes, and signed with Krasny Oktyabr of Russia, for the rest of the season.

On August 17, 2016, McGrath signed with Lietuvos rytas of the Lithuanian Basketball League. However, on August 31, 2016, McGrath terminated his contract with the team and returned to the United States, after he found out that his father had been diagnosed with an undisclosed form of cancer. On November 1, he was acquired by the Long Island Nets of the NBA Development League. On January 5, 2017, he was waived by the Nets, after appearing in twelve games. On January 12, 2017, he returned to AEK Athens, after 7 years, signing a contract for the rest of the 2016–17 season.

On August 10, 2017, McGrath signed with Real Betis Energía Plus of the Spanish LEB Oro.

== National team career ==
McGrath was able to attain Irish citizenship, enabling him to play in Europe with an Irish passport, because his grandmother was born in Ireland, before emigrating to New York when she was young. In 2006 and 2008, McGrath played on the Irish national basketball team in the EuroBasket Division B. In 2009, he led Ireland's team in scoring, and all players in group B, with a scoring average of 20.5 points per game, including scoring 32 points against Georgia in the qualifying rounds.

== Personal life ==
McGarth married Dominican model Arlenis Sosa in Punta Cana, Dominican Republic in June 2015.The couple later divorced.
