= Oriett Domenech =

Dominican fashion designer

Oriett Domenech (born 1983) is a Dominican fashion designer. She has presented collections at the Madrid Design Biennial, Paris Fashion Week, Berlin Fashion Week and Dominicana Moda.

== Early life and education ==
Domenech graduated with a bachelor's degree in marketing before studying illustration and fashion design studies at Altos de Chavón School of Design. She was then an intern for Oscar de la Renta and trained at the Istituto Europeo di design.

== Career ==
Domenech founded her eponymous womenswear brand in 2010. They produce two collections a year and made-to-measure pieces such as bridal gowns. Her signature style is architectural and her pieces are designed for women unafraid of commanding attention and showcasing femininity in their own terms. Her designs are sold by luxury retailers.

Her designs have been worn by Paulina Rubio, Kim Kardashian, Amelia Vega, Kendall Jenner, Arlenis Sosa, Rebecca Romijn, Carrie Underwood, Kat Graham and Ines Rivero.

== Awards ==
- 2009: The New Fashion Face Award, Dominican Republic Fashion Week.
- 2012: Ill Iberoamerican Biennial of Design in Madrid, Spain.
- 2014: 10 Best Dressed, Vogue Magazine, for Kendall Jenner wearing an Oriett Domenech jumpsuit at the Teen Choice Awards.
- 2016: 50 most powerful and influential women in the Dominican Republic, Forbes Magazine.
- 2016: Top 10 American Music Awards Red Carpet Looks of All Time, W Magazine, for Kendall Jenner wearing an Oriett Domenech 'Little Black Dress'.
