= Viktor Sanikidze =

Georgian professional basketball player

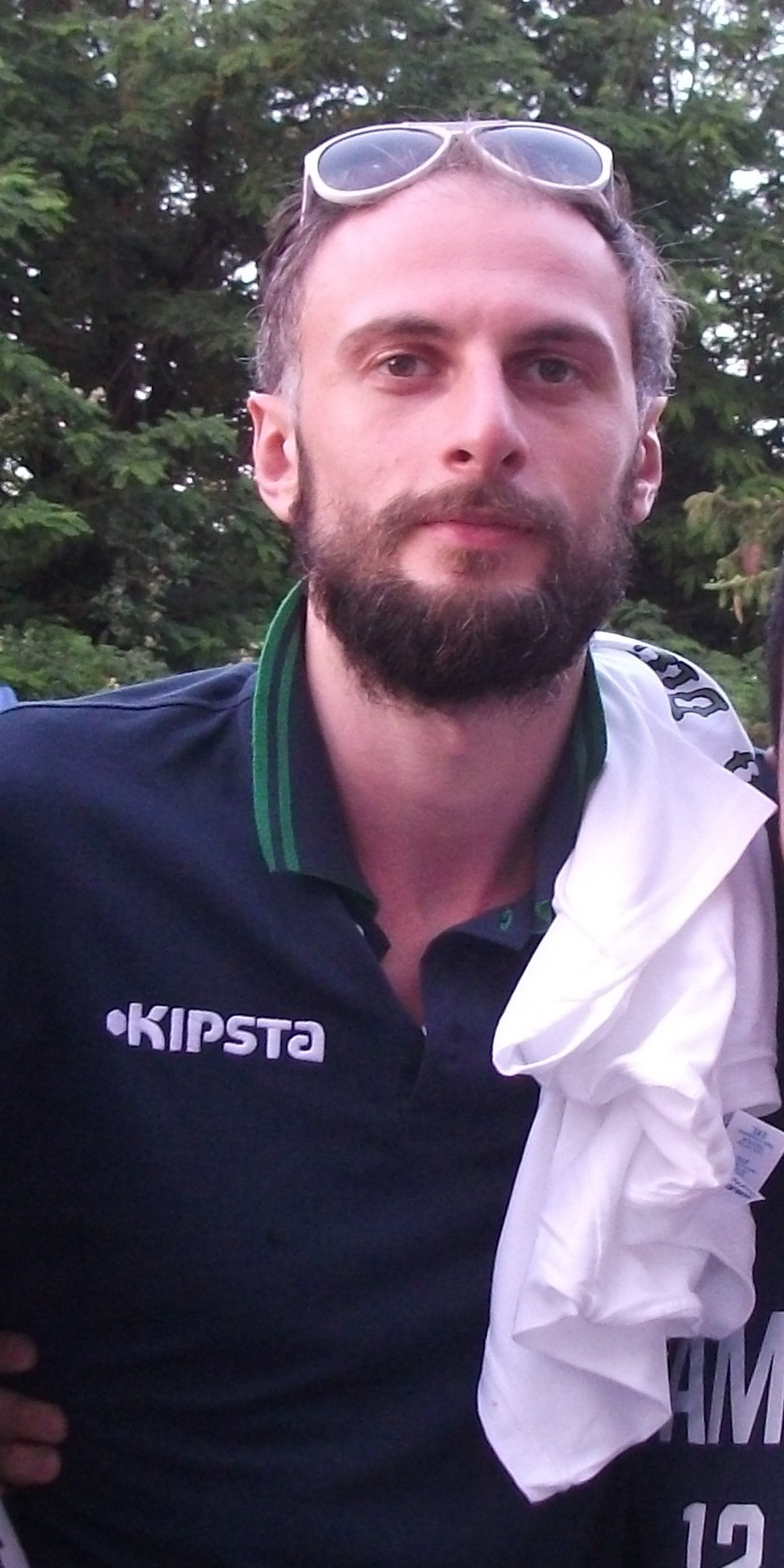

Personal information
- Born: 1 April 1986 (age 40) Tbilisi, Georgian SSR, USSR
- Listed height: 6 ft 8 in (2.03 m)
- Listed weight: 220 lb (100 kg)

Career information
- College: Globe Tech JC (2001–2002)
- NBA draft: 2004: 2nd round, 42nd overall pick
- Drafted by: Atlanta Hawks
- Playing career: 2003–2016
- Position: Small forward / power forward

Career history
- 2003–2006: SAOS JDA Dijon
- 2006–2007: Estudiantes
- 2008: Dinamo Tbilisi
- 2008–2009: Tartu Ülikool/Rock
- 2009–2012: Virtus Bologna
- 2012–2013: Montepaschi Siena
- 2013–2014: CAI Zaragoza
- 2014–2015: UNICS Kazan
- 2015–2016: TED Ankara Kolejliler
- 2016: Aris Thessaloniki

Career highlights
- Georgian League All-Star Game MVP (2008); Georgian League Slam Dunk champ (2008); Estonian League Slam Dunk champ (2009)
- Stats at Basketball Reference

Viktor Sanikidze

Member of the Parliament of Georgia
- Incumbent
- Assumed office 11 December 2020

Personal details
- Party: Georgian Dream (September 2020-present)

Viktor Sanikidze (alternate spelling: Victor) (Georgian: ვიქტორ სანიკიძე; born 1 April 1986) is a Georgian politician, former professional basketball executive and former player. He played at both the small forward and power forward positions in his entire career.

Sanikidze is a member of the Georgian Dream party. During the 2024–2025 Georgian protests, he gained notoriety for his well-publicized involvement in physical attacks against individuals who have spoken out against the ruling party.

== Early years ==
Sanikidze began his basketball career with the Academy Tbilisi youth teams in the Georgian Republic. In the 2001–02 season, Sanikidze attended and played basketball for Globe Tech Junior College in New York City. In the 2002–03 season, he returned home to Georgia, to play once again for Academy Tbilisi.

== Professional career ==
=== Europe ===
In 2003, Sanikidze signed with SAOS JDA Dijon, a pro club in the French Pro A League and a club competing in the European fourth-tier level league, the FIBA Europe Cup (later renamed FIBA EuroCup Challenge), at the time he joined the team. JDA Dijon made the FIBA Europe Cup finals, where they lost to Mitteldeutscher, during Sanikidze's first season with the club. He spent three seasons in France (2003–04, 2004–05 and 2005–06).

Sanikidze spent the 2006–07 season with the Spanish ACB League club MMT Estudiantes, a team that was competing in the European third-tier level league, the FIBA EuroCup (later renamed to EuroChallenge), at the time he joined the team. He missed the entire the 2007–08 season due to injury.

Sanikidze joined the Estonian League club Tartu Ülikool/Rock for the 2008–09 season. Tartu Ülikool/Rock also competed in the EuroChallenge League, the third-tier level of European-wide basketball, and the regional Baltic League. In August 2009, he moved to the Italian League club Virtus Bologna. On 11 July 2012, Sanikidze signed a multi-year deal with the Italian club Montepaschi Siena.

On 20 September 2013, he signed a one-year deal with the Spanish club CAI Zaragoza. On 31 July 2014, he signed a one-year deal with the Russian VTB United League club UNICS Kazan. On 3 August 2015, Sanikidze signed with TED Ankara Kolejliler of the Turkish League.

On 6 September 2016, Sanikidze signed with the Greek club Aris Thessaloniki for the 2016–17 season.

=== NBA ===
Sanikidze was selected with the 42nd pick of the 2004 NBA draft, by the Atlanta Hawks, but his draft rights were traded the same day to the San Antonio Spurs, for a 2005 second-round pick, and cash considerations. The Spurs still hold his NBA player rights, but they have yet to sign him to a contract, and he continues to play in Europe. In July 2007, Sanikidze played for San Antonio's NBA Summer League squad, during the Rocky Mountain Revue Summer League, scoring 15 points in a Spurs loss to the Philadelphia 76ers' summer league squad.

== National team career ==
Sanikidze played with the Republic of Georgia's junior national teams. With Georgia's junior teams, he played at the 2004 FIBA Europe Under-18 Championship, and also at the 2006 FIBA Europe Under-20 Championship Division B.

He has also been a member of the senior Georgian national basketball team, and with has competed with them in the European A Division EuroBasket. With Georgia's senior team, he played at the EuroBasket 2nd Division tournaments of the EuroBasket 2007 Division B and the EuroBasket 2009 Division B.

He also played in the EuroBasket 1st Division tournaments of EuroBasket 2011, EuroBasket 2013, and EuroBasket 2015.

== Basketball Executive career ==
On 24 August 2019, the Aris Thessaloniki announced that Sanikidze had returned as a sports director.

== Political career ==
On 10 September 2020, Sanikidze was named the 13th number on the Georgian Dream party list for the 2020 parliamentary elections.

Since 11 December 2020, Sanikidze is a member of Parliament of Georgia, and currently serving as first deputy chairperson of the Sports and Youth Issues Committee.

=== Violence against opposition ===
During the 2024–2025 Georgian protests, Sanikidze was involved in violent attacks against individuals who spoke out against the ruling Georgian Dream party and Sanikidze's continued support for that organization. Sanikidze further threatened a person he had physically attacked, suggesting that he would exact revenge upon their return to Tbilisi.
