= Benjamin Ortner =

Austrian basketball player (born 1983)

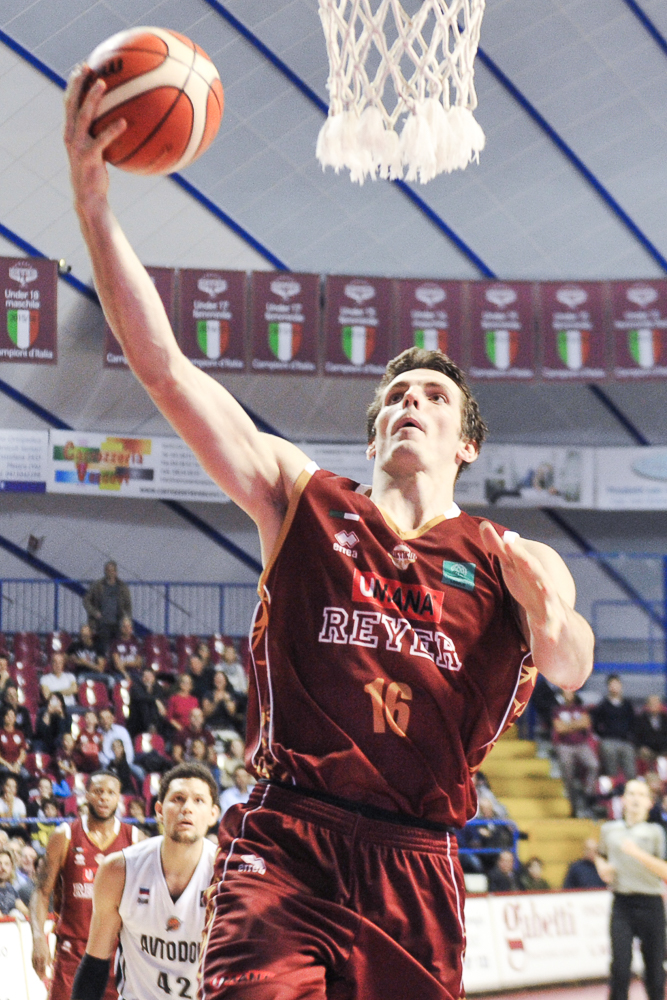
- Ortner with Venezia in 2016

Personal information
- Born: March 16, 1983 (age 43) Innsbruck, Austria
- Listed height: 6 ft 9 in (2.06 m)
- Listed weight: 226.6 lb (103 kg)

Career information
- College: Metro State (2001–2005)
- NBA draft: 2005: undrafted
- Playing career: 2000–present
- Position: Center

Career history
- 2000–2001: Tirol Innsbruck
- 2005–2008: Reggiana
- 2008–2009: Amatori Udine
- 2009–2011: Cantù
- 2011–2012: Benetton Treviso
- 2012: Gießen 46ers
- 2012–2014: Montepaschi Siena
- 2014–2017: Reyer Venezia
- 2017: Sidigas Avellino
- 2017–2018: Brescia Leonessa
- 2018–2019: Pallacanestro Reggiana

Career highlights
- 2× Italian League champion (2013, 2017); Italian Cup winner (2013); Italian Supercup winner (2013)

Benjamin Ortner (born March 16, 1983) is an Austrian former professional basketball player who last played for Pallacanestro Reggiana of the Italian Lega Basket Serie A (LBA).

== Early years and college career ==
Ortner was born and raised in Innsbruck, Austria, where he attended primary and secondary school. Prior to his junior year of high school, he decided to study abroad for a year in the United States where he attended St. Joseph Notre Dame High School, a well-known basketball school based in Alameda (CA).

Due to unfounded allegations made by other competing schools in the region, CIF forced Ortner to sit out the majority of the 1999-2000 season, eventually clearing him to play in the final four games of the year. That year, Ortner and St. Joseph's advanced to regional semi-finals where they lost to eventual champions and USA Today's #10 ranked team in the country, De La Salle of Concord.

Ortner subsequently went on to play collegiately at Metropolitan State University of Denver, and for head coach Mike Dunlap, where he won a Division II National Championship in 2002.

== Professional career ==
In September 2012, he signed a three-month contract with Gießen 46ers of the German Basketball Bundesliga. He left them after only 4 games and returned to Italy to sign with Montepaschi Siena.

In July 2014, he signed a one-year deal with Umana Reyer Venezia. One year later, both parties extended the contract through 2015-16.

In October 2017, Ortner signed a deal with Sidigas Avellino. On December 15, 2017, Ortner left Avellino and signed a deal with Germani Basket Brescia until the end of the season.

On November 13, 2018, Ortner officially signed a deal with Pallacanestro Reggiana.
