= Alex Liatsos =

Cypriot basketball player (born 1980)

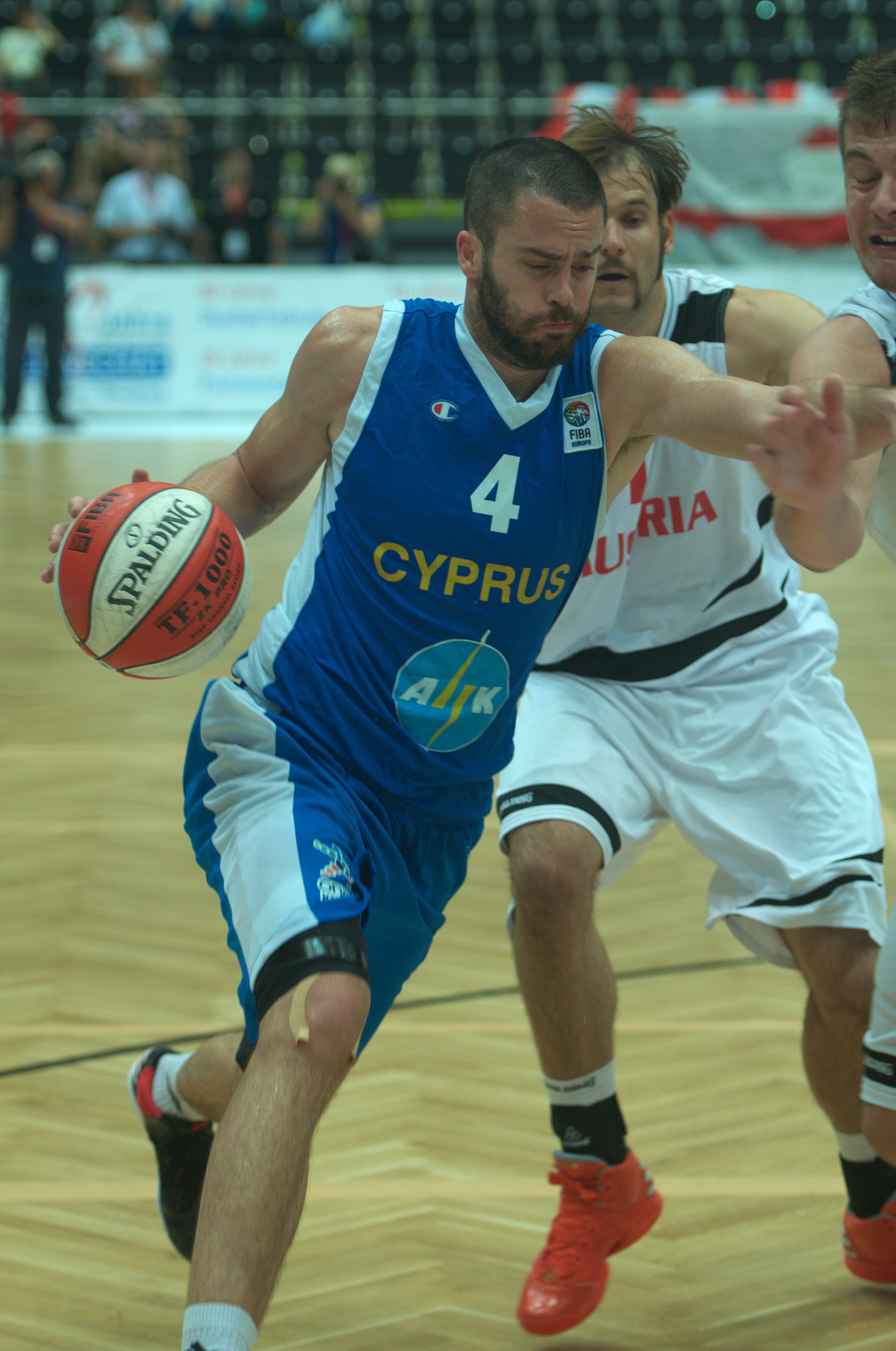
- Liatsos with the Cyprus national team

No. 4 – AEL Limassol
- Position: Power forward
- League: Cyprus Basketball Division 1

Personal information
- Born: November 18, 1980 (age 45) Limassol, Cyprus
- Listed height: 6 ft 7 in (2.01 m)
- Listed weight: 215 lb (98 kg)

Career information
- High school: River Rouge (River Rouge, Michigan)
- College: Olney Central (1998–2000); Ohio (2000–2002)
- NBA draft: 2002: undrafted
- Playing career: 2002–present

Career history
- 2003–2004: A.G.O.R
- 2005–2006: UJAP Quimper 29
- 2007–2008: Ilysiakos
- 2009–2011: Forex Time Apollon
- 2012–present: Proteas AEL
Medals
Men's basketball
Representing Cyprus
Games of the Small States of Europe
Gold medal – first place	2009 Cyprus	National Team

Alexandros "Alex" Liatsos is a Cypriot professional basketball player who currently plays for Proteas AEL of the Cyprus Basketball Division 1. He played college basketball with the Ohio Bobcats men's basketball team and Olney Central College from 1998 to 2002. Liatsos also represents Cyprus in international competition and FIBA events. He has competed with the national team on multiple occasions.
