= Arlenis Sosa =

Dominican model (born 1989)

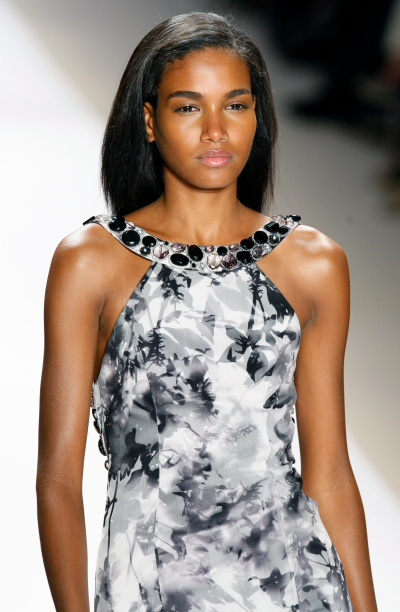
- Sosa at the Carlos Miele Spring 2009 Collection
- Born: Arlenis Sosa Peña; May 7, 1989 (age 36); Pepillo Salcedo, Monte Cristi, Dominican Republic
- Other name: Sunshine
- Spouses: Donnie McGrath (m. 2015, divorced) John McCarty (m. 2025)
- Modeling information
- Height: 1.80 m (5 ft 11 in)
- Hair color: Black
- Eye color: Brown
- Agency: The Society Management (New York); Elite Model Management (Paris, Milan); Models 1 (London); Traffic Models (Barcelona); Modelwerk (Hamburg)

Arlenis Sosa Peña (born May 7, 1989) is a Dominican model. She is the current spokesmodel for Lancôme and appeared in the 2008 Victoria's Secret Fashion Show.

== Early life and discovery ==
Sosa was born in Copey, a district of Pepillo Salcedo in Monte Cristi Province, Dominican Republic. She received her primary and secondary education at the Evangelical College Simon Bolivar in the city of Dajabón. When she was 16, Sosa intended to further her education in communication studies in Santo Domingo, but while walking in Copey with her family, designer Luis Menieur, her mother's agent, spotted her. He complimented Sosa and told her she could be a model in New York.

== Career ==
For two and half years, Sosa had to cope with the color prejudice of some Dominican designers, while she worked as a model in her homeland. Although she could not speak English when she moved to New York, she walked into Marilyn Models in March 2008 and was signed on the spot. Sosa dove head-first into the fashion industry, with Anna Wintour sending her to the Met Ball during her first week in New York. Two weeks after she signed, she booked her first editorials for major magazines Vogue and Vogue Italia. She since has been featured in editorials and articles in American, Italian, French, Teen, Spanish, and German Vogue, Allure, Elle, Interview, i-D, American and Spanish Harper's Bazaar. Sosa made her runway debut for Banana Republic's fall/winter 2008 collection, and she later walked for the Dior Resort show and opened for Oscar de la Renta.

Sosa has walked for some of the most prestigious designers and fashion houses in the world, including Shiatzy Chen, Ralph Lauren, Michael Kors, John Galliano, Emanuel Ungaro, Hussein Chalayan, Alexander Wang, Jean Paul Gaultier, Hermes, Bottega Veneta, Anna Sui, Carolina Herrera, Donna Karan, Tsumori Chisato, Jason Wu, Carlos Miele, Derek Lam, Isaac Mizrahi, Matthew Williamson, Narciso Rodriguez, Ruffian, Tadashi Shoji, Iceberg, Mariella Burani and Diane von Furstenberg. She participated in Victoria's Secret's fashion show in 2008. She has appeared in advertising campaigns for David Yurman, Topshop, Polo Ralph Lauren, Express, Lancôme, and GAP. Sosa, who is known for her full lips, became the face of Lancôme in September 2008.

== Personal life ==
Sosa married American basketball player Donnie McGrath on June 20, 2015, in the Dominican Republic. The couple later divorced.

On February 27, 2025, Sosa married John McCarty in Punta Cana, Dominican Republic.

Sosa supports Casa Esperanza (Hope House), a home for girls who have been victims of abuse in Bávaro, Dominican Republic. The organization provides shelter and basic necessities for the girls' development.
