= FIBA EuroBasket Division B =

The EuroBasket Division B was the second-ranked tier of the bi-annual EuroBasket competition. In this division the teams played off in order to get a promotion into Division A. Conversely, the two worst-performing teams of Division A were relegated into Division B. Also, the winner of the Division C tournament would be invited to promote to Division B.

EuroBasket Division B was played until 2011, when FIBA Europe decided to abolish the divisional system.

== Tournaments ==
Summaries
| Year | Promotion to EuroBasket qualification | | | Promotion to EuroBasket qualification | | |
| Year | Promoted | Aggregate score | Runner-up | Promoted | Aggregate score | Runner-up |
|---|---|---|---|---|---|---|
| 2005 details | FYR Macedonia | 200–137 | Austria | Denmark | 152–150 | Ireland |
| 2007 details | Finland | 187–144 | Romania | Great Britain | 163–119 | Switzerland |
| 2009 details | Montenegro | 158–121 | Sweden | Georgia | 175–159 | Belarus |
| 2011 details | The divisional system was abolished and there were no promotion games. | | | | | |
