= Mihai Paul =

Romanian basketball player

Mihail-Octavian Paul
CSA Steaua București
- Position: Point guard
- League: Liga Națională; FIBA Europe Cup

Personal information
- Born: May 12, 1982 (age 44) Ploiești, Romania
- Listed height: 6 ft 4 in (1.93 m)

Career information
- Playing career: 2006–present

Career history
- 2013–present: CSA Steaua București

Mihail-Octavian Paul (born May 12, 1982) is a Romanian professional basketball player, currently with CSA Steaua București of the Romanian Liga Națională and the FIBA Europe Cup.

He represented Romania's national basketball team at the EuroBasket 2015 qualification, where he was his team’s best free throw shooter.
