= Tyrone Ellis =

American basketball player (born 1977)

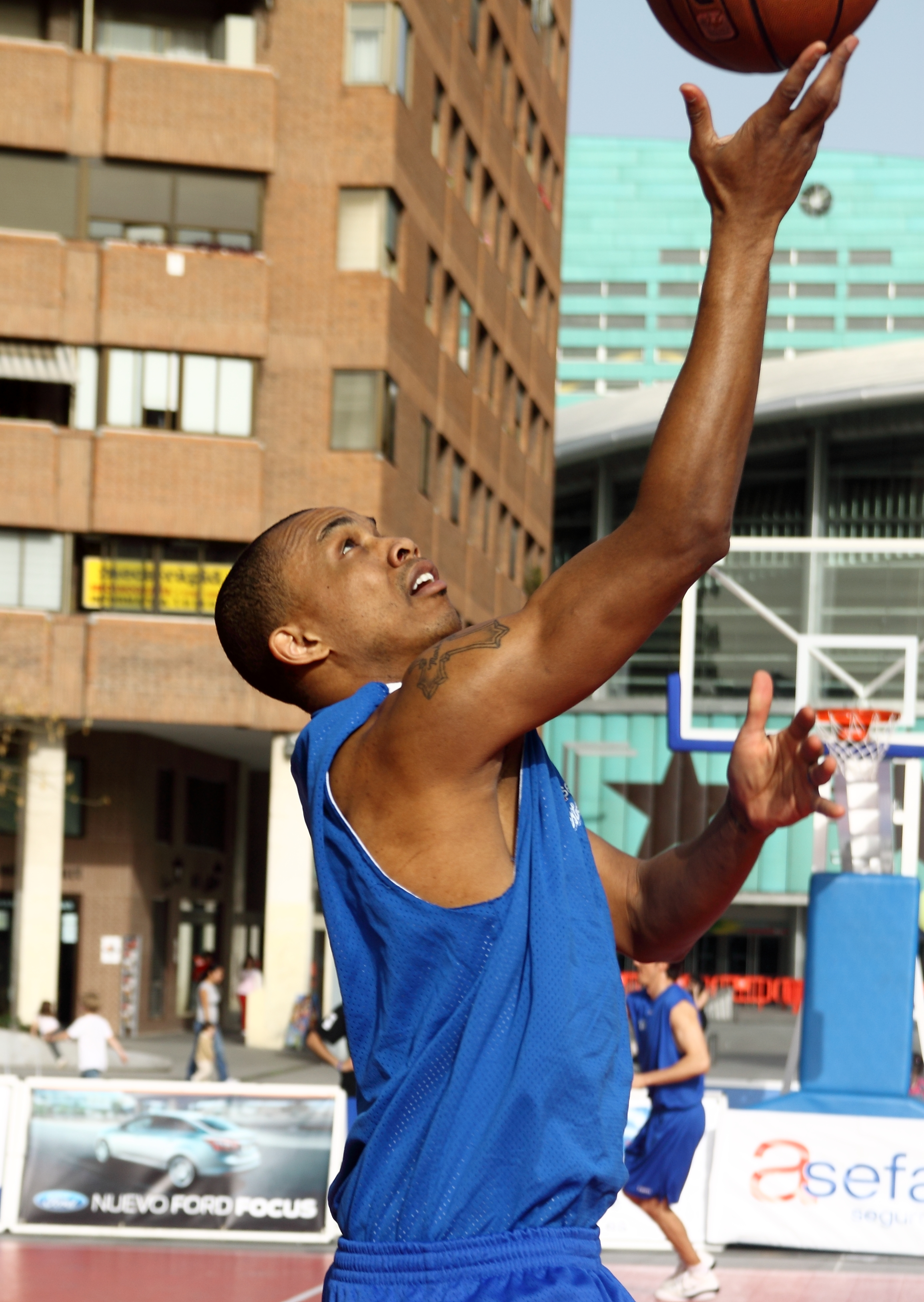
- Ellis playing an exhibition match in Madrid

Las Vegas Aces
- Title: Assistant coach
- League: WNBA

Personal information
- Born: October 5, 1977 (age 49) Dallas, Texas, U.S.
- Listed height: 6 ft 4 in (1.93 m)

Career information
- High school: David W. Carter (Dallas, Texas)
- College: Southern Nazarene (1997–2001)
- NBA draft: 2001: undrafted
- Playing career: 2001–2012
- Position: Guard
- Coaching career: 2012–present

Career history

Playing
- 2001–2002: Huntsville Flight
- 2002–2003: Girona
- 2003–2005: Skyliners Frankfurt
- 2005: Bellevue Blackhawks
- 2005–2006: Beşiktaş
- 2006–2007: Basket Napoli
- 2007–2010: Cajasol Sevilla
- 2010–2011: Estudiantes
- 2011–2012: Lucentum Alicante

Coaching
- 2012–2013: Tulsa 66ers (assistant)
- 2013–2014: Reno Bighorns (assistant)
- 2014–2015: Grand Rapids Drive (assistant)
- 2015–2016: Bakersfield Jam (assistant)
- 2016–2017: Northern Arizona Suns
- 2017–2018: Phoenix Suns (assistant)
- 2018–2020: Stockton Kings
- 2025–present: Las Vegas Aces (assistant)

Career highlights
- BBL Champion (2004); First-team NAIA All-American (2001)

Tyrone Ellis (born October 5, 1977) is an American-Georgian professional basketball coach and former player who is an assistant coach for the Las Vegas Aces of the Women’s National Basketball Association (WNBA). He is 1.93 m (6 ft 4 in) tall and played as a shooting guard. He was the first head coach named for both the Northern Arizona Suns and the Stockton Kings of the NBA G League.

== College career ==
Born in Dallas, Ellis graduated from Southern Nazarene University in Bethany, Oklahoma in 2001.

== Professional career ==
Since his graduation from Southern Nazarene University, Ellis has played professional basketball in the United States (Huntsville Flight), Germany (Frankfurt Skyliners), Turkey (Beşiktaş Cola Turka), Italy (Basket Napoli) and Spain (Casademont Girona, Cajasol Sevilla, Asefa Estudiantes). He also had Summer League stints with the Los Angeles Lakers and the Dallas Mavericks.

== Coaching career ==
On October 30, 2015, after stints with the Tulsa 66ers, Reno Bighorns and Grand Rapids Drive, Ellis was hired by the Bakersfield Jam to be an assistant coach in the NBA Development League. On July 15, 2016, Ellis was promoted to head coach for the Northern Arizona Suns, the recently relocated Bakersfield Jam franchise. During his first and only season coaching the Northern Arizona squad, he led the team to a 10–1 record to start the season, with the only loss occurring in double-overtime against the Los Angeles D-Fenders. However, by the end of the season, the Suns finished with a losing record of 22–28.

On July 5, 2017, Ellis was announced as the assistant coach for Team USA Basketball for the 2017 FIBA AmeriCup. Under the roster led by Jeff Van Gundy as head coach, Team U.S.A. would go undefeated to win the FIBA AmeriCup that year. On October 23, 2017, before the start of the Northern Arizona Suns' season, Ellis was named an assistant coach for the Phoenix Suns with the promotion of Phoenix assistant Jay Triano as the interim head coach.

In 2018, he was named the first head coach for the relocated Stockton Kings in the NBA G League.

On November 7, 2024, Ellis was hired as an assistant coach for Becky Hammon by the Las Vegas Aces.

== Georgia national team ==
Ellis was also a member of the Georgia national basketball team from 2006 to 2009. He played with the team at the Division B Eurobasket 2009 and averaged 16.0 points, 3.5 rebounds and 3.0 assists during the tournament. In the finals against Belarus he averaged 13.5 points and 3.0 assists and helped Georgia to move up to Division A.
