= Cătălin Burlacu =

Romanian basketball player

No. 10 – SCM CSU Craiova
- Position: Center

Personal information
- Born: July 3, 1977 (age 49) Iași, Romania
- Listed height: 6 ft 11 in (2.11 m)
- Listed weight: 253 lb (115 kg)

Career information
- College: Politehnica Iași (1997-2000)
- Playing career: 2000–present

Career history
- 2000–2003: West Petrom Arad
- 2003: Brandt Hagen
- 2004–2006: CSU Asesoft Ploiești
- 2006–2007: BC Kalev
- 2007–2008: Scandone Avellino
- 2008–2015: CSU Asesoft Ploiești
- 2015–present: SCM U Craiova

Career highlights
- FIBA Europe Cup champion (2005)

Cătălin Burlacu (born July 7, 1977) is a Romanian professional basketball player for SCM U Craiova in the Romanian League.
