= Bryan Defares =

Dutch basketball player (born 1981)

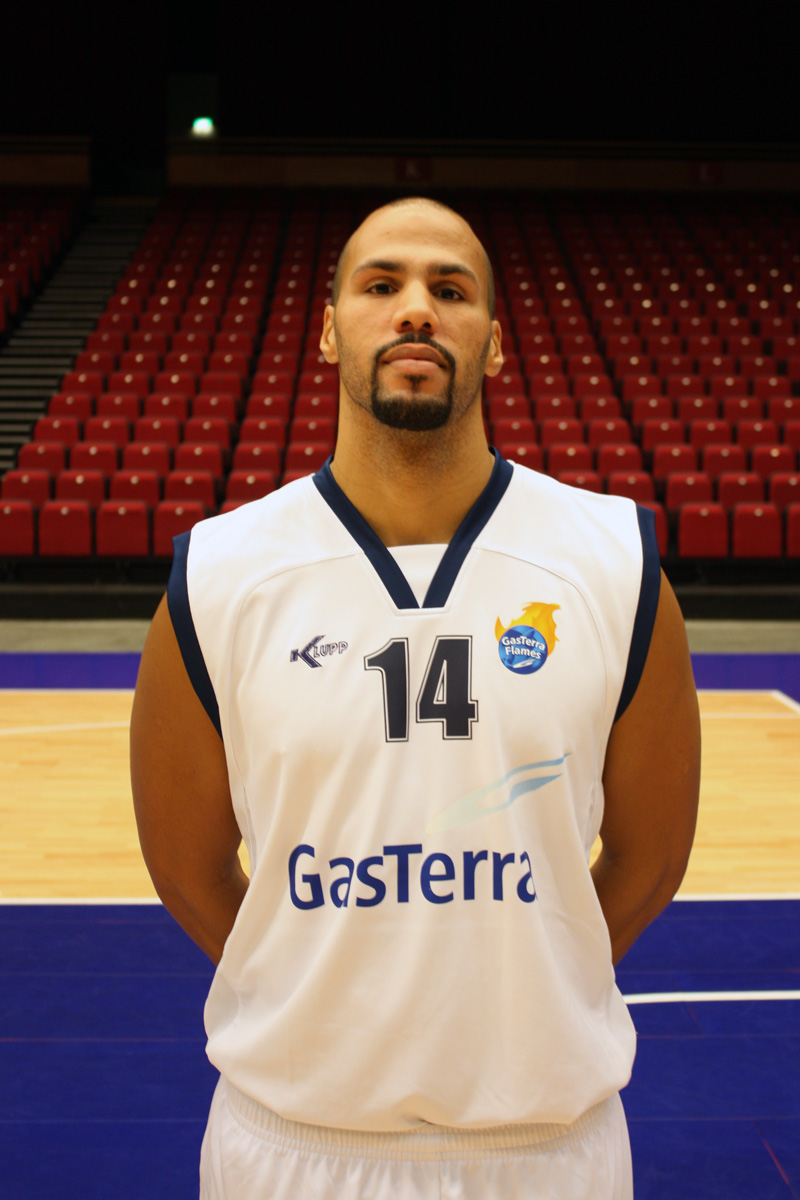
- Defares in his GasTerra Flames jersey in 2011

Personal information
- Born: 14 June 1981 (age 45) Amsterdam, Netherlands
- Listed height: 1.92 m (6 ft 4 in)

Career information
- High school: Tamalpais (Mill Valley, California)
- College: Boise State (2000–2004)
- NBA draft: 2004: undrafted
- Playing career: 2004–2011
- Position: Point guard

Career history
- 2004: Peristeri
- 2005–2006: Kolossos Rodou
- 2006–2007: Gijón Baloncesto
- 2007–2008: Ase Doukas
- 2008: Newcastle Eagles
- 2009: Ammerud
- 2009–2010: West-Brabant Giants
- 2010–2011: GasTerra Flames

Bryan Defares (born 14 June 1981) is a Dutch former basketball player. Defares was a member of the Dutch national basketball team from 2004 till 2012.

== College career ==
While at Boise State University, DeFares reached the school’s 1,000 points club and is in the Top 10 in Games Played, Free Throws, Free Throw Attempts and Assists. Bryan also holds BSU’s Single Game Assists record with 13 assists vs. UNLV in 2004. DeFares helped lead the Broncos the 2004 NIT Sweet Sixteen.

== Professional career ==
Professionally, Defares was named the Bosman Player of the Year while playing for Peristeri (Greece).

Defares enjoyed an extensive playing career, beginning with his high school and AAU years. Defares helped lead Tamalpais High School (Mill Valley, California) to a California state championship in 2000. He played with Oakland (Slam-n-Jam) Soldiers in 1999-2000 for Coach Ken Carter, whom the 2005 MTV/Tollin-Robbins produced film Coach Carter, starring Samuel L. Jackson, was based.

== Present ==
Currently, DeFares is an assistant basketball coach at Treasure Valley Community College in Ontario, Oregon. He received a BA in Social Science with a minor in Economics from Boise State University and is employed by the Boise School District.
