= Conor Grace =

Irish basketball player (born 1982)

Personal information
- Born: January 31, 1982 (age 43) Dublin, Ireland
- Listed height: 210 cm (6 ft 11 in)

Career information
- High school: Bridgton Academy (North Bridgton, Maine)
- College: Davidson (2001–2005)
- NBA draft: 2005: undrafted
- Playing career: 2005–2016
- Position: Power forward

Career history
- 2005–2006: Viola Reggio Calabria
- 2007: Boulazac Basket Dordogne
- 2007–2008: Team Componenta Karkkila
- 2008: Norrköping Dolphins
- 2008–2009: Ilysiakos
- 2009–2010: Neptune
- 2010: ZZ Leiden
- 2010: Westports Malaysia Dragons
- 2010–2011: Norrköping Dolphins
- 2012: Uppsala Basket
- 2012: Eco Örebro
- 2012–2013: DCU Saints
- 2013: LF Basket
- 2015–2016: Templeogue Azzurri Dublin
- 2015: →Hibernia

Career highlights
- Premier League All-Star Third Pick (2016); Dutch Cup winner (2010)
- Stats at Basketball Reference

Conor Thomas Grace (born 31 January 1982) is an Irish former professional basketball player. He previously played for the Irish national team.

Grace was born in Dublin, Ireland.

Grace played rugby in high school, as well as soccer, tennis and track, in addition to basketball. At 14 years old, then 6'4", he caught the eye of Irish under-18 basketball coach, John O'Connor, at a camp. This led to him hooking up with UCD Marian to further his development. He later moved to the United States and joined an AAU program. After playing in a tournament in Las Vegas, Grace drew interest from Southern Utah University but they didn't have space to offer a scholarship. He instead went to a prep school in Maine, Bridgton Academy, and committed to Davidson College for the 2001–02 season, a Division I college basketball program. In 109 games for the Wildcats over four seasons, Grace averaged 6.0 points, 5.7 rebounds and 1.3 assists per game.

As a professional, Grace has played in Italy, France, Finland, Sweden, Greece, the Netherlands, Malaysia, and his home country of Ireland in the Premier League. In 2015–16, he earned Premier League All-Star Third Pick honours while playing for Templeogue, despite undergoing season-ending finger surgery in January 2016.

Grace is the son of Tom and Anne Grace, and has two sisters, Louise and Caroline. He got his athletic genes from his father, who played rugby for the Irish national team and the British Lions.
