= Vildan Mitku =

Albanian basketball player (born 1983)

Personal information
- Born: January 26, 1983 (age 43) Shkodër, Albania
- Listed weight: 209 lb (95 kg)

Career information
- High school: University Polytechnic Tirana, Tirana Albania
- Playing career: 1997–2018
- Position: Small forward

Career history
- 1997–1999: Vllaznia
- 1999–2002: Tirana
- 2002–2005: Dinamo Tirana
- 2005–2006: Valbona
- 2006–2008: Studenti Tirana
- 2009–2010: Bonn-Meckenheim
- 2011–2018: Tigers Tübingen

Career highlights
- A1 Albania MVP

Vildan Mitku (born 26 January 1983 in Shkodër, Albania) is a 200 cm tall Albanian former professional basketball player who last played for Tigers Tübingen in the Basketball Bundesliga.
