= Costas Papaellinas Arena =

Indoor arena in Strovolos, Nicosia, Cyprus

Coordinates: 35.1517966°N 33.3398598°E

- Interactive map of Costas Papaellinas Arena
- Location: Strovolos, Nicosia
- Capacity: 2,000

Tenant
- Keravnos BC

Costas Papaellinas Arena is an indoor arena in Strovolos, Nicosia, Cyprus. It is the home venue of the Keravnos BC. Currently the arena has a capacity around 2,000 seats.
