= Radoslav Rančík =

Slovak basketball player

No. 31 – Inter Bratislava
- Position: Power forward
- League: SBA; FIBA Europe Cup

Personal information
- Born: 6 October 1979 (age 47) Košice, Slovakia
- Listed height: 2.07 m (6 ft 9 in)
- Listed weight: 106 kg (234 lb)

Career information
- High school: Saint Louis Park (St. Louis Park, Minnesota)
- College: St. Cloud State (1998–2002)
- NBA draft: 2002: undrafted
- Playing career: 2002–2018

Career history
- 2002–2003: Istra Pula
- 2003: Limoges CSP
- 2003: Paris Basket Racing
- 2003–2004: Châlons-en-Champagne
- 2004–2005: ALM Évreux Basket
- 2005–2008: ČEZ Nymburk
- 2008–2009: Benetton Treviso
- 2009–2011: Galatasaray
- 2011–2012: Azovmash Mariupol
- 2012: Inter Bratislava
- 2012–2015: ČEZ Nymburk
- 2015–present: Inter Bratislava

Career highlights
- 6× Czech League champion (2006, 2007, 2008, 2013, 2014, 2015); 4× Czech Cup winner (2007, 2008, 2013, 2014); 3× Czech League MVP (2007, 2008, 2013); Slovak League champion (2017); Slovak Cup winner (2016); 8× Slovak Player of the Year (2007, 2008, 2009, 2013, 2014, 2015, 2016, 2017); Slovak League MVP (2016)

Radoslav Rančík (born 6 October 1979) is a Slovak retired professional basketball player.

== Professional career ==
Rančík started his career with Istra Pula in Croatia. He then played in France. After joining the Czech club ČEZ Nymburk, he went on to play at Benetton Treviso, Galatasaray Istanbul, Azovmash Mariupol, and Inter Bratislava, before moving back to ČEZ Nymburk. He played with several teams in the European-wide 2nd-tier level EuroCup competition.

== National team career ==
Rančík has been a member of the senior Slovak national basketball team. He played at the 2019 FIBA World Cup qualification.

== Personal life ==
Rančík's older brother, Martin Rančík, is also a former professional basketball player.
