= Martin Rajniak =

Former professional basketball player (born 1978)

Martin Rajniak (born April 24, 1978) is a former professional basketball player.

== Early life ==
Born in Bratislava, Slovakia, Rajniak relocated to Luxembourg City as a youth. He began his collegiate career playing at Cuesta College in San Luis Obispo, California, where he scored a program-record 1,206 points in two years.

He then transferred to CSU Bakersfield, and earned All-CCAA First Team honors as a senior for the Roadrunners in 2003–04. The 6-foot-9 Rajniak made 56 of 115 attempts from 3-point range during his CSUB career, for a .487 percentage.

== Professional basketball career ==
Rajniak first played professionally as a forward for T71 Dudelange.

Playing for his native Luxembourg, he averaged 22.0 points over four games at the FIBA EuroBasket 2005 Division B tournament, leading the field.

Offensively, his top pro season came in 2011–12, when he averaged 21.8 points for Esch.
