= Thomas Schumacher =

American theatre producer

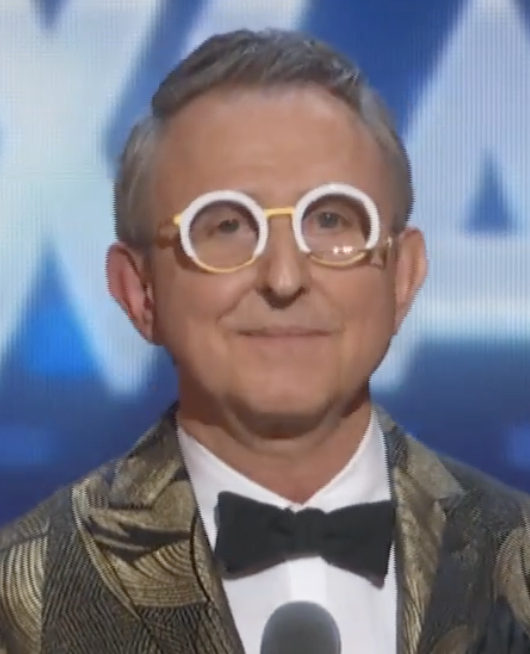
- Schumacher speaking at the 2019 Tony Awards

President of Disney Theatrical Group
- In office June 2001 – September 2025
- Preceded by: Ron Logan
- Succeeded by: Andrew Flatt (as Managing Director) & Anne Quart (as Executive Producer)

President of Walt Disney Feature Animation
- In office January 1999 – 2002
- Preceded by: Peter Schneider
- Succeeded by: David Stainton

Personal details
- Born: Thomas Hubbard Caswell Schumacher III; December 5, 1957 (age 68) Glendale, California, U.S.
- Spouse: Matthew White (m. 2012)
- Occupation: Theatrical producer

Thomas Schumacher (born December 5, 1957) is a film and theatrical producer. He was the president of Disney Theatrical Group, the theatrical production arm of The Walt Disney Company.

== Life and career ==
Schumacher studied theatre at UCLA. In 1987 he was associate director of the Los Angeles Festival of Arts, presenting the American premiere of Cirque du Soleil and the English-language premiere of Peter Brook's The Mahabharata. Previously, he spent five years on staff at the Mark Taper Forum, served as a line producer on the 1984 Olympic Arts Festival, and served as assistant general manager of the Los Angeles Ballet. He then joined the Disney company in 1988, producing the animated film, The Rescuers Down Under, which was released in 1990.

With The Lion King under consideration for the next Broadway adaptation, Eisner ceded Disney Theatrical Productions to theatre-rooted Disney Animation president Peter Schneider and Schumacher, at their request, making them president and executive vice president of DTP, respectively. In 1994, Schumacher said that handing over the reins of the film to producer Don Hahn was painful. However, he was proud of the musical partnership between lyricist Tim Rice and singer Elton John whose songs "soar" through the film, although he was initially unsure of hiring John because he thought he was too big of a name. Schneider, through whom Schumacher got his job, described him as successful and arguing he has "great taste". Schumacher also said that he loathed saying there were gay characters because people will want him to "go backward and point them out". He further noted that Jeffrey Katzenberg asked if any of the gay references in the 1992 film Aladdin offended him, and he said the references were in "good fun", remarking that they should not deny that "swishy fashion designers" exist.

Schneider was promoted to Disney Studios president in January 1999, while Thomas Schumacher was promoted to president of Walt Disney Feature Animation and Walt Disney Theatrical Productions. The two also became co-presidents of Disney Theatrical which was renamed to Buena Vista Theatrical Group Limited with two divisions—Disney Theatricals and Hyperion Theatricals—headed by Schneider and Schumacher. With Schneider leaving in June 2001 to form his own theater production company partly funded by Disney, Schumacher became the sole president of Buena Vista Theatrical Group and head of its divisions.

In an Interview with Rich Roll, Pixar co-founder Edwin Catmull has described Schumacher as an important outside creative influence for early Pixar films. He says Schuhmacher was a very creative person with an understanding of filmmaking.

After overseeing the production of numerous films, Schumacher left Walt Disney Feature Animation in 2002, replaced by David Stainton.

He transitioned to solely focus on the growing theatrical business as its head. He is a member of the board of trustees for Broadway Cares/Equity Fights AIDS, the Tony Administration Committee and the Advisory Committee of the American Theatre Wing. He is a mentor for the TDF Open Doors program and serves as an adjunct professor at Columbia University. In March 2016, the gala of the Theatre Development Fund saluted Schumacher and Disney Theatrical Productions. He also is the chairman of the Board of The Broadway League.

On February 21, 2018, The Wall Street Journal reported that Schumacher was the subject of an internal investigation at Disney into inappropriate behavior, with eyewitness accounts detailing aggressive sexual language and intimidation dating back to the 1990s. This reportedly included remarks toward male employees, including comments about the "sexual prowess of black men". It was also said that he denied the accusations and committed to being "more mindful and adhering to company policies going forward."

Schumacher has worked with The Walt Disney Company since 1988 and served as President of Disney Theatrical Group from 2001 to 2025.

On September 3, 2025, it was announced that Schumacher would depart from Disney Theatrical Group at the end of the month.

== Publications ==
Schumacher is the author of the book How Does the Show Go On? An Introduction to the Theater (Disney Editions, 2007; 2019).

== Personal life ==
In June 1994, Schumacher told The Advocate that he was an "out gay man" when he began working at Disney, and argued there were "a lot of gay people at every level" of Disney, and called it a "very supportive environment", with The Advocate calling him one of the "most influential gay men" in Hollywood. He also brought his partner, Matthew White, a ballet dancer in Los Angeles, to the annual company party and other company retreats. He noted that while some were "uncomfortable" with Schumacher bringing his partner, that higher executives like Jeffrey Katzenberg and Michael Eisner did not trouble him over it.

In November 2012, Schumacher married White, his longtime partner and interior designer.
