= Oliver Vogt =

German politician

Member of the Bundestag
- Incumbent
- Assumed office 2021

Personal details
- Born: 15 July 1977 (age 49) Neuhaus am Rennweg, West Germany (now Germany)
- Party: CDU
- Education: Bielefeld University

Oliver Vogt (born 15 July 1977) is a German teacher and politician of the Christian Democratic Union (CDU) who has been serving as a member of the Bundestag since the 2021 elections, representing the Minden-Lübbecke I district.

== Early life and career ==
Vogt was born in 1977 in the East German town of Neuhaus am Rennweg and became a member of the Bundestag in 2021.

Vogt grew up in Espelkamp, where he graduated from the Söderblom-Gymnasium in 1997. From 1997 to 1998 he did his basic military service in the Navy, serving at the Eckernförde, Flensburg and Glücksburg-Meierwik locations. From 1998 to 2004 he studied physics at Bielefeld University, where he graduated as a physicist. He then worked as a research assistant and received his doctorate in 2007.

Starting in 2008 Vogt began work as a physics and mathematics high school teacher at the Besselgymnasium Minden.

== Political career ==
In parliament, Vogt has been serving on the Budget Committee and the Audit Committee. On the Budget Committee, he is his parliamentary group's rapporteur on the annual budget of the Federal Ministry of Agriculture, Food and Regional Identity.
