= FIBA EuroBasket 2013 qualification =

Basketball tournament qualification

This page describes the qualification procedure for EuroBasket 2013.

== Map ==
Participant countries of EuroBasket 2013.

== Qualified teams ==
Eight teams have secured their places at the EuroBasket 2013 before the qualification process. Sixteen teams qualified through the Qualifying Round.

5 Groups of 5 Teams, 1 Group of 6 Teams (The First 2 Teams of each group and the 4 best third placed teams will qualify for EuroBasket 2013)

Qualified as the host nation:

- Slovenia

Qualified through the participation at the 2012 Olympic basketball tournament

- France
- Great Britain
- Lithuania
- Russia
- Spain

Qualified through the participation at the 2012 FIBA World Olympic Qualifying Tournament

- Greece
- Macedonia

Qualified through the qualification

- Belgium
- Bosnia and Herzegovina
- Croatia
- Czech Republic
- Finland
- Georgia
- Germany
- Italy
- Israel
- Latvia
- Montenegro
- Poland
- Serbia
- Sweden
- Turkey
- Ukraine

== Qualification format ==
31 teams were drawn into 5 groups of 5 teams and one more group of 6 teams. The first 2 teams in each group and the 4 best third place teams qualified for EuroBasket 2013. The games were played between 15 August and 11 September 2012.

=== Group seedings ===
Pot 1	Pot 2	Pot 3	Pot 4	Pot 5	Pot 6
Serbia; Turkey; Germany; Finland; Georgia; Croatia	Ukraine; Bulgaria; Poland; Bosnia and Herzegovina; Israel; Italy	Montenegro; Latvia; Belgium; Portugal; Hungary; Sweden	Czech Republic; Estonia; Netherlands; Switzerland; Austria; Azerbaijan	Belarus; Slovakia; Romania; Albania; Luxembourg; Cyprus	Iceland

== Qualifying round ==
The qualification draw took place on 4 December 2011 in Freising, Germany.

Group A	Group B	Group C	Group D	Group E	Group F
Serbia; Israel; Montenegro; Estonia; Slovakia; Iceland	Germany; Bulgaria; Sweden; Azerbaijan; Luxembourg	Croatia; Ukraine; Hungary; Austria; Cyprus	Georgia; Bosnia and Herzegovina; Latvia; Netherlands; Romania	Poland; Finland; Belgium; Switzerland; Albania	Turkey; Italy; Portugal; Czech Republic; Belarus

=== Group A ===
Team	Pld	W	L	PF	PA	Diff	Pts	Tie-break
Montenegro	10	10	0	814	697	+117	20	
Israel	10	6	4	861	751	+90	16	2–2 (+26)
Serbia	10	6	4	846	721	+125	16	2–2 (+21)
Estonia	10	6	4	768	761	+7	16	2–2 (−47)
Iceland	10	1	9	743	920	−177	11	1–1 (+4)
Slovakia	10	1	9	704	886	−182	11	1–1 (−4)

All times are local

14 August 2012
20:00

Report

Iceland	78–91	Serbia
Scoring by quarter: 19–24, 10–23, 20–19, 29–25
Pts: Stefánsson 21; Rebs: Baeringsson 8 Asts: Stefánsson 6		Pts: Savanović 18; Rebs: Mačvan 9 Asts: Nedović 5

Laugardalshöll, Reykjavík
Attendance: 1,670
Referees: Nicolas Maestre (FRA), Robert Hickman (ENG), Rune Ressel Larsen (DEN)

15 August 2012
18:00

Report

Montenegro	75–69	Israel
Scoring by quarter: 17–20, 20–14, 11–22, 27–13
Pts: three players 12; Rebs: Šehović 11; Asts: Rochestie 5		Pts: Eliyahu 22; Rebs: Ohayon 10; Asts: Ohayon 4

Morača Sports Center, Podgorica
Attendance: 3,800
Referees: Sasa Pukl (SLO), Paolo Taurino (ITA), Elias Koromilas (GRE)

15 August 2012
20:30

Report

Estonia	95–74	Slovakia
Scoring by quarter: 27–20, 24–22, 24–18, 20–14
Pts: Talts 16; Rebs: Talts 11; Asts: Sokk 7		Pts: Vojtek 13; Rebs: Pandula 5 Asts: Gavel, Nuber 3

Saku Suurhall Arena, Tallinn
Attendance: 3,500
Referees: Martynas Gudas (LTU), Mathieu Bayot (BEL), Andris Aunkrogers (LAT)

18 August 2012
18:00

Report

Slovakia	75–81	Iceland
Scoring by quarter: 17–21, 19–23, 23–10, 16–27
Pts: Gavel 31; Rebs: Vido 10; Asts: Marko 5		Pts: Stefánsson 28; Rebs: Baeringsson 11; Asts: four players 3

City Sport Hall, Levice
Attendance: 700
Referees: Guerrino Cerebuch (ITA), Janusz Calik (POL), Gellert Kapitany (HUN)

18 August 2012
20:30

Report

Serbia	71–73	Montenegro
Scoring by quarter: 23–15, 12–20, 20–17, 16–21
Pts: Teodosić 21; Rebs: Mačvan 5 Asts: Teodosić 5		Pts: Šehović 17; Rebs: Šehović 10; Asts: Rochestie 3

Belgrade Arena, Belgrade
Attendance: 18,150
Referees: Juan Arteaga (ESP), Robert Lottermoser (GER), Olegs Latisevs (LAT)

18 August 2012
21:00

Report

Israel	86–88 (OT)	Estonia
Scoring by quarter: 25–12, 15–15, 18–25, 17–23, Overtime: 11–13
Pts: Casspi 23; Rebs: Ohayon 9 Asts: Ohayon 7		Pts: Kangur 21; Rebs: Vene 10; Asts: Sokk 6

Bet Maccabi, Rishon LeZion
Attendance: 2,200
Referees: Sreten Radović (CRO), Sergey Mikhaylov (RUS), Sergiy Zashchuk (UKR)

21 August 2012
18:00

Report

Slovakia	71–93	Serbia
Scoring by quarter: 24–26, 15–30, 13–23, 19–14
Pts: Gavel 26; Rebs: Vido 4 Asts: Gavel 7		Pts: Teodosić 15; Rebs: Bjelica 9 Asts: Teodosić 7

City Sport Hall, Levice
Attendance: 1,600
Referees: Srdan Dozai (CRO), Marek Maliszewski (POL), Marko Vuckovic (SLO)

21 August 2012
19:15

Report

Iceland	83–110	Israel
Scoring by quarter: 19–29, 17–21, 15–30, 32–30
Pts: Pálsson 19; Rebs: Baeringsson 8 Asts: Stefánsson 6		Pts: Limonad, Casspi 17; Rebs: Tyus 9 Asts: Ohayon 6

Laugardalshöll, Reykjavík
Attendance: 1,570
Referees: Joseph Bissang (FRA), Bert Van Slooten (NED), Simon Unsworth (ENG)

21 August 2012
20:30

Report

Estonia	64–77	Montenegro
Scoring by quarter: 9–17, 14–16, 17–21, 24–23
Pts: Dorbek 16; Rebs: four players 4 Asts: Sokk 6		Pts: Šehović 22; Rebs: Dubljević 11; Asts: Šehović 3

Saku Suurhall Arena, Tallinn
Attendance: 6,000
Referees: Carl Jungebrand (FIN), Janusz Calik (POL), Fedja Serhatlic (SWE)

24 August 2012
18:00

Report

Slovakia	64–82	Israel
Scoring by quarter: 20–27, 15–20, 12–22, 17–13
Pts: Gavel 22; Rebs: Vido 6 Asts: Gavel 6		Pts: Tyus 18; Rebs: Tyus 7 Asts: Halperin 6

City Sport Hall, Levice
Attendance: 1,000
Referees: Grzegorz Ziemblicki (POL), Boris Schmidt (GER), Christoph Rohacky (AUT)

24 August 2012
20:30

Report

Montenegro	85–67	Iceland
Scoring by quarter: 26–15, 22–17, 12–13, 25–22
Pts: Dubljević 16; Rebs: Sekulić 9 Asts: Rochestie, Dašić 6		Pts: Baeringsson 19; Rebs: Baeringsson 6 Asts: Baeringsson, Stefánsson 3

Nikšić Sports Center, Nikšić
Attendance: 4,200
Referees: Ademir Zurapovic (BIH), Panagiotis Anastopoulos (GRE), Aleksander Pavlov (MKD)

24 August 2012
20:30

Report

Serbia	88–63	Estonia
Scoring by quarter: 26–15, 24–13, 20–13, 18–22
Pts: Krstić, Teodosić 12; Rebs: Kešelj 8 Asts: Teodosić 5		Pts: Hallik 11; Rebs: Talts 8 Asts: Sokk 4

SPC Vojvodina, Novi Sad
Attendance: 7,250
Referees: Sasa Pukl (SLO), Anastasios Piloidis (GRE), Gentian Cici (ALB)

27 August 2012
18:00

Report

Slovakia	81–94	Montenegro
Scoring by quarter: 20–23, 12–24, 24–23, 25–24
Pts: Gavel 23; Rebs: Pandula, Batka 5 Asts: Gavel 10		Pts: Šehović 16; Rebs: Dubljević 10; Asts: Rochestie 5

City Sport Hall, Levice
Attendance: 900
Referees: Marek Cmikiewicz (POL), Tomislav Vovk (CRO), Andrej Jersan (SLO)

27 August 2012
19:15

Report

Iceland	67–86	Estonia
Scoring by quarter: 15–25, 12–13, 15–28, 25–20
Pts: Stefánsson 19; Rebs: Baeringsson 8 Asts: Sigurðarson, Stefánsson 3		Pts: Kangur 26; Rebs: Vene 9 Asts: Sokk 8

Laugardalshöll, Reykjavík
Attendance: 922
Referees: Lahdo Sharro (SWE), Bert Van Slooten (NED), Torkild Rodsand (NOR)

28 August 2012
20:30

Report

Israel	89–76	Serbia
Scoring by quarter: 25–15, 23–23, 17–18, 24–20
Pts: Casspi 23; Rebs: three players 7 Asts: Casspi 4		Pts: Teodosić, Erceg 10; Rebs: Erceg, Mačvan 5 Asts: Teodosić 4

Nokia Arena, Tel Aviv
Attendance: 9,000
Referees: Ivo Dolinek (CZE), Borys Ryzhyk (UKR), Anton Makhlin (RUS)

30 August 2012
18:00

Report

Slovakia	70–84	Estonia
Scoring by quarter: 15–21, 17–22, 21–18, 17–23
Pts: Gavel 35; Rebs: Pandula, Sykora 8 Asts: three players 3		Pts: Vene 16; Rebs: Talts 16; Asts: Talts 4

City Sport Hall, Levice
Attendance: 700
Referees: Dubravko Muhvic (CRO), Petar Denkovski (MKD), Nebojsa Kovacevic (GER)

30 August 2012
20:30

Report

Serbia	114–58	Iceland
Scoring by quarter: 25–12, 31–17, 18–20, 30–9
Pts: Krstić 15; Rebs: four players 6 Asts: Tepić, Teodosić 5		Pts: Sigurðarson 14; Rebs: Baeringsson 9 Asts: Baeringsson 4

Čair Sports Center, Niš
Attendance: 4,560
Referees: Matej Boltauzer (SLO), Chrisostomos Schinas (GRE), Ilya Putenko (RUS)

30 August 2012
20:30

Report

Israel	76–81	Montenegro
Scoring by quarter: 12–17, 25–14, 24–27, 15–23
Pts: Casspi 20; Rebs: Ohayon 7 Asts: Ohayon 8		Pts: Dašić 20; Rebs: Dubljević 10; Asts: Dašić 5

Nokia Arena, Tel Aviv
Attendance: 10,000
Referees: Miguel Perez Perez (ESP), Spyridon Gontas (GRE), Miroslav Tomov (BUL)

2 September 2012
15:45

Report

Iceland	84–86	Slovakia
Scoring by quarter: 25–18, 22–31, 13–13, 24–24
Pts: Baeringsson 21; Rebs: Baeringsson 12; Asts: Baeringsson 5		Pts: Gavel 35; Rebs: Sykora, Nuber 7 Asts: Gavel 6

Laugardalshöll, Reykjavík
Attendance: 700
Referees: Regis Bardera (FRA), Clemens Fritz (GER), Bo Bundgaard (DEN)

2 September 2012
20:00

Report

Estonia	53–84	Israel
Scoring by quarter: 13–21, 17–19, 10–19, 13–25
Pts: Talts 14; Rebs: Talts 10; Asts: Sokk 4		Pts: Casspi 26; Rebs: Eliyahu 11; Asts: Ohayon 7

Saku Suurhall Arena, Tallinn
Attendance: 6,950
Referees: Haydn Jones (WAL), Apostolos Kalpakas (SWE), Johannes Sarekoski (FIN)

2 September 2012
20:30

Report

Montenegro	72–62	Serbia
Scoring by quarter: 11–17, 21–12, 19–18, 21–15
Pts: Šehović 20; Rebs: Popović 8 Asts: Rochestie 5		Pts: Teodosić 13; Rebs: Bjelica 9 Asts: Teodosić 6

Morača Sports Center, Podgorica
Attendance: 5,500
Referees: Luigi Lamonica (ITA), Damir Javor (SLO), Emin Mogulkoc (TUR)

5 September 2012
20:30

Report

Israel	92–75	Iceland
Scoring by quarter: 17–20, 25–18, 25–18, 25–19
Pts: Casspi 22; Rebs: Eliyahu 11; Asts: Eliyahu 5		Pts: Sigurðarson 21; Rebs: Baeringsson 11; Asts: Ermolinskij 7

Nokia Arena, Tel Aviv
Attendance: 4,000
Referees: Dubravko Muhvic (CRO), Antonis Demetriou (CYP), David Berekashvili (GEO)

5 September 2012
20:30

Report

Serbia	87–62	Slovakia
Scoring by quarter: 22–10, 20–15, 23–19, 22–18
Pts: Nedović 20; Rebs: Štimac 9 Asts: three players 4		Pts: Bilik 16; Rebs: Vido, Sýkora 5 Asts: Nuber 5

Kristalna dvorana, Zrenjanin
Attendance: 3,100
Referees: Vicente Bulto (ESP), Murat Biricik (TUR), Damir Kunosic (BIH)

5 September 2012
20:30

Report

Montenegro	76–67	Estonia
Scoring by quarter: 24–15, 13–12, 19–22, 20–18
Pts: Dašić 14; Rebs: Sekulić, Dašić 8 Asts: Šehović 3		Pts: Arbet 12; Rebs: Kangur 8 Asts: Kangur 5

Morača Sports Center, Podgorica
Attendance: 4,100
Referees: Engin Kennerman (TUR), Chrisostomos Schinas (GRE), Zoran Mitrovski (MKD)

8 September 2012
15:45

Report

Iceland	92–101	Montenegro
Scoring by quarter: 23–19, 38–20, 15–30, 16–32
Pts: Stefánsson 32; Rebs: Baeringsson 9 Asts: three players 5		Pts: Dašić 38; Rebs: Dašić 14; Asts: Rochestie 5

Laugardalshöll, Reykjavík
Attendance: 650
Referees: Neil Wilkinson (ENG), Apostolos Kalpakas (SWE), Anthonie Sinterniklaas (NED)

8 September 2012
20:30

Report

Estonia	88–81	Serbia
Scoring by quarter: 16–22, 25–21, 22–20, 25–18
Pts: Kangur 19; Rebs: Vene 10; Asts: Sokk 8		Pts: Krstić 20; Rebs: Krstić 9 Asts: Teodosić 2

Saku Suurhall Arena, Tallinn
Attendance: 4,800
Referees: Regis Bardera (FRA), Aliaksandr Syrytsa (BLR), Toni Rodriguez (GER)

8 September 2012
21:00

Report

Israel	106–73	Slovakia
Scoring by quarter: 23–19, 26–23, 32–8, 25–23
Pts: Eliyahu 18; Rebs: Tyus 11; Asts: Eliyahu 12		Pts: Vojtek 17; Rebs: Vojtek, Mrvis 4 Asts: Nuber 7

Nokia Arena, Tel Aviv
Attendance: 7,000
Referees: Paolo Taurino (ITA), Borys Shulga (UKR), Ilya Putenko (RUS)

11 September 2012
20:30

Report

Montenegro	80–48	Slovakia
Scoring by quarter: 27–6, 17–14, 22–18, 14–10
Pts: Dubljević 25; Rebs: Dubljević 12; Asts: Rochestie 7		Pts: Pandula 11; Rebs: Bátka 5 Asts: Nuber 3

Morača Sports Center, Podgorica
Attendance: 3,200
Referees: Juan Arteaga (ESP), Matej Boltauzer (SLO), Aleksandar Milojevic (MKD)

11 September 2012
20:30

Report

Serbia	83–67	Israel
Scoring by quarter: 28–14, 23–17, 12–16, 20–20
Pts: Tepić 16; Rebs: Krstić 7 Asts: Teodosić 7		Pts: Casspi 20; Rebs: Kozikaro, Casspi 4 Asts: Casspi 4

Pionir Hall, Belgrade
Attendance: 6,150
Referees: Christos Christodoulou (GRE), Emilio Perez (ESP), Marek Cmikiewicz (POL)

11 September 2012
20:30

Report

Estonia	80–58	Iceland
Scoring by quarter: 24–22, 23–10, 15–11, 18–15
Pts: Vene 23; Rebs: Talts 11; Asts: Kangur 5		Pts: Stefánsson 13; Rebs: Baeringsson 10; Asts: Baeringsson, Stefánsson 2

Saku Suurhall Arena, Tallinn
Attendance: 4,500
Referees: Nick Van den Broeck (BEL), Oskars Lucis (LAT), Simon Unsworth (ENG)

=== Group B ===
Team	Pld	W	L	PF	PA	Diff	Pts	Tie-break
Germany	8	8	0	695	547	+148	16	
Sweden	8	4	4	678	624	+54	12	2–2 (+20)
Bulgaria	8	4	4	669	647	+22	12	2–2 (−9)
Azerbaijan	8	4	4	658	660	−2	12	2–2 (−11)
Luxembourg	8	0	8	580	802	−222	8	

All times are local

15 August 2012
17:00

Report

Luxembourg	78–101	Azerbaijan
Scoring by quarter: 17–31, 24–28, 25–27, 12–15
Pts: Picard 28; Rebs: Picard 6 Asts: Schumacher 3		Pts: Pashayev 21; Rebs: Rindin 10; Asts: Niftaliyev 4

d'Coque, Luxembourg City
Attendance: 500
Referees: Joseph Bissang (FRA), Bert Van Slooten (NED), Christoph Rohacky (AUT)

15 August 2012
18:00

Report

Bulgaria	78–73	Sweden
Scoring by quarter: 21–19, 23–21, 16–17, 18–16
Pts: Kostov 13; Rebs: Nikolov 10; Asts: Videnov 5		Pts: Jerebko 26; Rebs: Kjellbom, Maråker 6 Asts: Jerebko 6

Universiada Hall, Sofia
Attendance: 1,000
Referees: Seffi Shemmesh (ISR), Zafer Yilmaz (TUR), Ilya Putenko (RUS)

18 August 2012
19:00

Report

Germany	101–53	Luxembourg
Scoring by quarter: 25–10, 20–17, 25–22, 31–4
Pts: Benzing 17; Rebs: Pleiß, Zirbes 8 Asts: Schaffartzik 4		Pts: Jones 19; Rebs: Schumacher 6 Asts: three players 2

ENERVIE Arena, Hagen
Attendance: 2,566
Referees: Panagiotis Anastopoulos (GRE), Tamas Földhazi (HUN), Semen Ovinov (RUS)

18 August 2012
20:00

Report

Azerbaijan	88–73	Bulgaria
Scoring by quarter: 26–14, 27–17, 23–21, 12–21
Pts: Davis 30; Rebs: Haciyev 15; Asts: Pashayev 6		Pts: Avramov 16; Rebs: Videnov, Kostov 5 Asts: three players 3

Serhedchi Sport Olympic Centre, Baku
Attendance: 2,000
Referees: Igor Dragojevic (MNE), Rüstü Nuran (TUR), Sergey Krug (RUS)

21 August 2012
18:00

Report

Bulgaria	70–82	Germany
Scoring by quarter: 14–22, 14–19, 22–17, 20–24
Pts: Simmons 21; Rebs: Simmons 9 Asts: Avramov 5		Pts: Jagla 19; Rebs: Jagla 10; Asts: Schaffartzik 10

Universiada Hall, Sofia
Attendance: 2,500
Referees: Emin Mogulkoc (TUR), Oscar Perea (ESP), Saso Petek (SLO)

21 August 2012
19:00

Report

Sweden	96–79	Azerbaijan
Scoring by quarter: 15–25, 26–17, 25–18, 30–19
Pts: Maråker 19; Rebs: Kjellbom 14; Asts: Grant 10		Pts: Carroll 27; Rebs: Haciyev 17; Asts: Pashayev 4

Boråshallen, Borås
Attendance: 2,623
Referees: Petri Mäntylä (FIN), Dariusz Lenczowski (POL), Sigmundur Herbertsson (ISL)

24 August 2012
19:30

Report

Luxembourg	68–94	Bulgaria
Scoring by quarter: 18–22, 18–27, 12–20, 20–25
Pts: Schumacher 22; Rebs: three players 4 Asts: Schumacher 4		Pts: Videnov 19; Rebs: Simmons 10; Asts: Videnov 6

d'Coque, Luxembourg City
Attendance: 250
Referees: Sérgio Silva (POR), Mathieu Bayot (BEL), Gavin Williams (WAL)

24 August 2012
20:15

Report

Germany	81–66	Sweden
Scoring by quarter: 19–17, 26–11, 21–14, 15–24
Pts: Schaffartzik, Benzing 15; Rebs: Pleiß, Jagla 6 Asts: Schaffartzik 5		Pts: Jerebko 22; Rebs: Maråker 8 Asts: Grant 5

Arena Ulm/Neu-Ulm, Neu-Ulm
Attendance: 6,000
Referees: Miguel Perez Perez (ESP), Paolo Taurino (ITA), Nick Van den Broeck (BEL)

27 August 2012
19:00

Report

Sweden	111–74	Luxembourg
Scoring by quarter: 27–13, 28–24, 31–16, 25–21
Pts: Saks 16; Rebs: Jerebko 9 Asts: Grant 6		Pts: Jones 17; Rebs: Genevo 5 Asts: three players 3

Stadium Arena, Norrköping
Attendance: 1,198
Referees: Aare Halliko (EST), Aliaksandr Syrytsa (BLR), Henri Hilke (FIN)

27 August 2012
20:00

Report

Azerbaijan	68–85	Germany
Scoring by quarter: 15–17, 19–26, 16–16, 18–26
Pts: Davis 31; Rebs: Rindin 7 Asts: Davis 4		Pts: Staiger 18; Rebs: Benzing 13; Asts: Benzing 3

Serhedchi Sport Olympic Centre, Baku
Attendance: 2,000
Referees: Elias Koromilas (GRE), Sergiy Chebyshev (UKR), Alexey Davydov (RUS)

30 August 2012
19:00

Report

Sweden	85–71	Bulgaria
Scoring by quarter: 23–19, 26–20, 13–21, 23–11
Pts: Grant 19; Rebs: Grant 7 Asts: Massamba 6		Pts: Kostov 20; Rebs: Simmons 8 Asts: Avramov 5

Stadium Arena, Norrköping
Attendance: 2,222
Referees: Carl Jungebrand (FIN), Sergey Mikhaylov (RUS), Oskars Lucis (LAT)

30 August 2012
20:00

Report

Azerbaijan	95–77	Luxembourg
Scoring by quarter: 16–13, 30–23, 22–22, 27–19
Pts: Carroll 26; Rebs: three players 12; Asts: Pashayev 8		Pts: Picard, Rajniak 15; Rebs: Jones 9 Asts: Schumacher 8

Serhedchi Sport Olympic Centre, Baku
Attendance: 2,000
Referees: Engin Kennerman (TUR), Igor Demenkov (RUS), Serghei Tislenco (MDA)

2 September 2012
16:00

Report

Luxembourg	67–95	Germany
Scoring by quarter: 18–18, 19–31, 12–24, 18–22
Pts: Rajniak 12; Rebs: Rajniak 4 Asts: Rajniak 6		Pts: Pleiß 17; Rebs: Pleiß 11; Asts: Staiger, Tadda 2

d'Coque, Luxembourg City
Attendance: 1,850
Referees: Gianluca Mattioli (ITA), Vincent Delestrée (BEL), Paul Den Hartog (NED)

2 September 2012
18:00

Report

Bulgaria	94–77	Azerbaijan
Scoring by quarter: 26–13, 11–18, 31–16, 26–30
Pts: Nikolov 26; Rebs: Simmons 12; Asts: Kostov 5		Pts: Davis 17; Rebs: Davis 13; Asts: Davis 5

Arena Samokov, Samokov
Attendance: 1,500
Referees: Doru Vinasi (ROU), Haris Bijedic (BIH), Vladyslav Isachenko (UKR)

5 September 2012
19:15

Report

Germany	79–69	Bulgaria
Scoring by quarter: 17–12, 24–20, 21–21, 17–16
Pts: Schaffartzik, Pleiß 16; Rebs: Pleiß 14; Asts: Tadda 5		Pts: Kostov 16; Rebs: Simmons 8 Asts: Videnov, Simmons 4

Trier Arena, Trier
Attendance: 3,050
Referees: Sreten Radovic (CRO), Ersan Kartal (TUR), Johann Jeanneau (FRA)

5 September 2012
20:00

Report

Azerbaijan	82–76	Sweden
Scoring by quarter: 25–19, 15–20, 20–19, 22–18
Pts: Haciyev 28; Rebs: Haciyev 13; Asts: Pashayev 6		Pts: Jerebko 20; Rebs: Kjellbom 13; Asts: Grant, Massamba 7

Serhedchi Sport Olympic Centre, Baku
Attendance: 2,500
Referees: Omer Esteron (ISR), Sergiy Zashchuk (UKR), Ciprian Stoica (ROU)

8 September 2012
17:00

Report

Sweden	86–91	Germany
Scoring by quarter: 26–21, 17–21, 24–22, 19–27
Pts: Jerebko 32; Rebs: Jerebko 10; Asts: Massamba 7		Pts: Schaffartzik 21; Rebs: Pleiß 7 Asts: Schaffartzik 5

Stadium Arena, Norrköping
Attendance: 2,985
Referees: Luigi Lamonica (ITA), Piotr Pastusiak (POL), Haydn Jones (WAL)

8 September 2012
17:30

Report

Bulgaria	120–95	Luxembourg
Scoring by quarter: 30–21, 26–31, 23–12, 41–31
Pts: Kostov 33; Rebs: Varbanov 8 Asts: Videnov 8		Pts: Jones, Picard 21; Rebs: Picard, Rajniak 6 Asts: Koster, Birenbaum 6

Arena Samokov, Samokov
Attendance: 1,500
Referees: Recep Ankarali (TUR), Chris Dodds (SCO), Dragan Kralj (BIH)

11 September 2012
19:30

Report

Germany	81–68	Azerbaijan
Scoring by quarter: 21–22, 22–17, 15–15, 23–14
Pts: three players 11; Rebs: Ohlbrecht 11; Asts: Benzing 6		Pts: Davis 25; Rebs: Haciyev 14; Asts: Davis 5

EWE Arena, Oldenburg
Attendance: 2,227
Referees: Fernando Rocha (POR), Marcin Kowalski (POL), Mathieu Bayot (BEL)

11 September 2012
19:30

Report

Luxembourg	68–85	Sweden
Scoring by quarter: 18–24, 8–17, 21–22, 21–22
Pts: Schumacher 20; Rebs: Genevo 7 Asts: Birenbaum 3		Pts: Kjellbom 22; Rebs: Jerebko 8 Asts: Massamba 6

d'Coque, Luxembourg City
Attendance: 400
Referees: Ivo Dolinek (CZE), Paul Walton (ENG), Nicolaas Zwiep (NED)

=== Group C ===
Team	Pld	W	L	PF	PA	Diff	Pts	Tie-break
Croatia	8	8	0	685	539	+146	16	
Ukraine	8	6	2	580	523	+57	14	
Austria	8	3	5	601	589	+12	11	1–1 (+10)
Hungary	8	3	5	593	619	−31	11	1–1 (−10)
Cyprus	8	0	8	445	634	−189	8	

All times are local

15 August 2012
19:00

Report

Ukraine	77–71	Hungary
Scoring by quarter: 23–20, 16–21, 18–18, 20–12
Pts: Gladyr 19; Rebs: Drozdov 9 Asts: Bertt, Gladyr 4		Pts: Hanga 21; Rebs: Lóránt 5 Asts: Horváth 5

Sports Complex Meteor, Dnipropetrovsk
Attendance: 5,000
Referees: Daniel Hierrezuelo (ESP), Anastasios Piloidis (GRE), Marek Maliszewski (POL)

15 August 2012
20:30

Report

Cyprus	86–89 (OT)	Austria
Scoring by quarter: 17–22, 12–21, 22–13, 18–13, Overtime: 17–20
Pts: King 23; Rebs: King 9 Asts: Sizopoulos		Pts: Detrick 20; Rebs: Detrick, Mahalbašić 8 Asts: five players 2

Eleftheria Indoor Hall, Nicosia
Attendance: 500
Referees: Ioannis Foufis (GRE), Igor Mitrovski (MKD), Florin Grigoras (ROU)

18 August 2012
20:20

Report

Austria	57–61	Ukraine
Scoring by quarter: 19–16, 10–16, 22–16, 6–13
Pts: Lamesic 18; Rebs: Lamesic 7 Asts: Detrick 4		Pts: Pecherov 11; Rebs: Korniyenko 8 Asts: Gladyr 5

Multiversum, Schwechat
Attendance: 350
Referees: Sasa Maricic (SRB), Toni Rodriguez (GER), Chris Dodds (SCO)

18 August 2012
20:30

Report

Croatia	93–38	Cyprus
Scoring by quarter: 17–10, 23–13, 25–12, 28–3
Pts: Bogdanović 17; Rebs: three players 3 Asts: Ukić, Babić 5		Pts: King 9 Rebs: Sizopoulos 6 Asts: Liatsos 2

Gradski sportski centar, Makarska
Attendance: 300
Referees: Ademir Zurapovic (BIH), Alexandru Olaru (ROU), Uros Obrknezevic (SRB)

21 August 2012
19:00

Report

Ukraine	79–80 (OT)	Croatia
Scoring by quarter: 22–18, 16–18, 15–16, 16–17, Overtime: 10–11
Pts: Kravtsov 14; Rebs: Pecherov 8 Asts: Bertt 4		Pts: Bogdanović 20; Rebs: Simon, Žorić 7 Asts: Bogdanović 5

Sports Palace, Kyiv
Attendance: 4,000
Referees: Jose Martin (ESP), Jakub Zamojski (POL), Seffi Shemmesh (ISR)

21 August 2012
19:00

Report

Hungary	81–75	Austria
Scoring by quarter: 14–13, 19–25, 25–21, 23–16
Pts: Lóránt 19; Rebs: Lóránt 10; Asts: Trotter 5		Pts: Mahalbašić 17; Rebs: Mahalbašić 7 Asts: Detrick 3

Arena Savaria, Szombathely
Attendance: 2,000
Referees: Keith Williams (ENG), Saverio Lanzarini (ITA), Zdenko Zubak (SVK)

24 August 2012
20:00

Report

Croatia	89–65	Hungary
Scoring by quarter: 20–14, 27–18, 20–18, 22–15
Pts: Ukić 18; Rebs: Andrić, Simon 5 Asts: Stipčević 4		Pts: Hanga 19; Rebs: Lóránt 6 Asts: Trotter 5

Arena of Drava Visual, Osijek
Attendance: 3,000
Referees: Robert Lottermoser (GER), Elias Koromilas (GRE), Andrej Jersan (SLO)

24 August 2012
20:30

Report

Cyprus	47–68	Ukraine
Scoring by quarter: 10–16, 12–14, 16–15, 9–23
Pts: King 13; Rebs: King 14; Asts: King 3		Pts: Zabirchenko 15; Rebs: Korniyenko 9 Asts: three players 3

Eleftheria Indoor Hall, Nicosia
Attendance: 200
Referees: Petros Papapetrou (GRE), Regis Bardera (FRA), Rafael Ganiev (RUS)

27 August 2012
19:00

Report

Hungary	77–64	Cyprus
Scoring by quarter: 21–21, 18–9, 26–20, 12–14
Pts: Lóránt 25; Rebs: Lóránt, Trotter 7 Asts: Trotter 4		Pts: Trisokkas 20; Rebs: Trisokkas, King 9 Asts: Razis 5

Lauber Dezsö Sport Hall, Pécs
Attendance: 2,000
Referees: Robert Vyklicky (CZE), Markos Michaelides (SUI), Marin Mehandjiev (BUL)

27 August 2012
20:20

Report

Austria	75–82	Croatia
Scoring by quarter: 23–20, 12–24, 23–16, 17–22
Pts: Mahalbašić 21; Rebs: Mahalbašić 6 Asts: Lanegger 4		Pts: Bogdanović 19; Rebs: Markota 10; Asts: Ukić 7

Multiversum, Schwechat
Attendance: 1,100
Referees: Mauro Pozzana (ITA), Aleksandar Milojevic (MKD), Petr Hrusa (CZE)

30 August 2012
19:00

Report

Hungary	76–78	Ukraine
Scoring by quarter: 15–18, 15–19, 21–20, 25–21
Pts: Trotter 19; Rebs: Szabó 6 Asts: Trotter 5		Pts: Gladyr 17; Rebs: Natyazhko 9 Asts: Bertt, Gladyr 4

Lauber Dezsö Sport Hall, Pécs
Attendance: 2,500
Referees: Juris Kokainis (LAT), Georgios Tanatzis (GRE), Branislav Mrdak (SRB)

30 August 2012
20:20

Report

Austria	77–52	Cyprus
Scoring by quarter: 24–14, 14–8, 19–22, 20–8
Pts: Klepeisz 15; Rebs: Lanegger, Mahalbašić 6 Asts: Detrick 5		Pts: Sizopoulos 12; Rebs: King 11; Asts: Razis 3

Multiversum, Schwechat
Attendance: 350
Referees: Emilio Perez (ESP), Boris Gabara (SVK), Anastasios Manos (GRE)

2 September 2012
16:00

Report

Ukraine	68–57	Austria
Scoring by quarter: 19–14, 20–18, 13–18, 16–7
Pts: Gladyr 17; Rebs: Korniyenko 12; Asts: Gladyr 5		Pts: Lamesic 13; Rebs: Lamesic 8 Asts: five players 2

Sports Palace Galychyna, Lviv
Attendance: 1,170
Referees: Tomasz Trawicki (POL), Aliaksandr Syrytsa (BLR), Zafer Yilmaz (TUR)

2 September 2012
20:30

Report

Cyprus	49–98	Croatia
Scoring by quarter: 17–18, 14–22, 16–25, 2–33
Pts: King 20; Rebs: King 9 Asts: six players 1		Pts: Andrić, Simon 16; Rebs: Andrić, Šarić 7 Asts: Ukić, Simon 5

Eleftheria Indoor Hall, Nicosia
Attendance: 300
Referees: Ivo Dolinek (CZE), Marius Ciulin (ROU), Erez Gurion (ISR)

5 September 2012
20:00

Report

Croatia	84–80	Ukraine
Scoring by quarter: 20–25, 28–10, 15–20, 21–25
Pts: Andrić 16; Rebs: Šarić 8 Asts: Ukić 6		Pts: Burtt 22; Rebs: Kravtsov 6 Asts: Burtt 7

Sports Hall Vijus, Slavonski Brod
Attendance: 2,200
Referees: Luigi Lamonica (ITA), Jurgis Laurinavicius (LTU), Benjamin Barth (GER)

5 September 2012
20:20

Report

Austria	97–81	Hungary
Scoring by quarter: 27–15, 23–23, 26–25, 21–18
Pts: Mahalbašić 21; Rebs: Schreiner 9 Asts: Lanegger 6		Pts: Hanga 20; Rebs: Lóránt 8 Asts: Trotter 4

Multiversum, Schwechat
Attendance: 500
Referees: Charalampos Karakatsounis (GRE), Milan Brziak (SVK), Vladan Sundic (MNE)

8 September 2012
16:00

Report

Ukraine	69–51	Cyprus
Scoring by quarter: 18–13, 10–14, 13–10, 28–14
Pts: Burtt 13; Rebs: Natyazhko 13; Asts: Zabirchenko, Drozdov 3		Pts: Trisokkas 15; Rebs: Trisokkas 10; Asts: Sizopoulos 4

Olymp, Yuzhne
Attendance: 1,200
Referees: Fernando Rocha (POR), Alexey Davydov (RUS), Tomas Lukac (SVK)

8 September 2012
19:00

Report

Hungary	79–81	Croatia
Scoring by quarter: 12–16, 20–18, 21–16, 26–31
Pts: Lóránt 24; Rebs: Lóránt 8 Asts: Hanga 7		Pts: Bogdanović 17; Rebs: Šarić 9 Asts: Ukić 7

Arena Savaria, Szombathely
Attendance: 3,000
Referees: Roberto Chiari (ITA), Sérgio Silva (POR), Boris Gabara (SVK)

11 September 2012
20:00

Report

Croatia	78–74	Austria
Scoring by quarter: 24–17, 20–15, 21–21, 13–21
Pts: Ukić 16; Rebs: Žorić 9 Asts: Ukić 3		Pts: Detrick 19; Rebs: Lamešić 7 Asts: Lamešić, Mahalbašić 4

Žatika Sport Centre, Poreč
Attendance: 500
Referees: Spyridon Gontas (GRE), Rüstü Nuran (TUR), Alexey Davydov (RUS)

11 September 2012
20:30

Report

Cyprus	58–63	Hungary
Scoring by quarter: 20–6, 11–23, 7–17, 20–17
Pts: Sizopoulos 15; Rebs: King 12; Asts: Razis 5		Pts: Lóránt 13; Rebs: Lóránt 9 Asts: Trotter 7

Eleftheria Indoor Hall, Nicosia
Attendance: 150
Referees: Daniel Hierrezuelo (ESP), Chrisostomos Schinas (GRE), Bernard Vassallo (MLT)

=== Group D ===
Team	Pld	W	L	PF	PA	Diff	Pts	Tie-break
Bosnia and Herzegovina	8	6	2	736	672	+64	14	1–1 (+3)
Georgia	8	6	2	707	666	+41	14	1–1 (−3)
Latvia	8	5	3	655	584	+71	13	
Netherlands	8	2	6	667	726	−59	10	
Romania	8	1	7	569	686	−117	9	

All times are local

15 August 2012
18:00

Report

Romania	90–84	Netherlands
Scoring by quarter: 26–27, 17–18, 25–18, 20–21
Pts: Mandache 19; Rebs: Dragusin, Nicoara 7 Asts: Moldoveanu 9		Pts: Norel 27; Rebs: four players 6 Asts: Jansen 3

Transilvania Hall, Sibiu
Attendance: 1,500
Referees: Eddie Viator (FRA), Emin Mogulkoc (TUR), Marko Vučković (SLO)

15 August 2012
18:30

Report

Bosnia and Herzegovina	87–84	Latvia
Scoring by quarter: 23–22, 18–16, 23–29, 23–17
Pts: Teletović 24; Rebs: Wright 11; Asts: Wright, Đedović 4		Pts: Strēlnieks 18; Rebs: Bērziņš 11; Asts: Bertāns 7

Dvorana Mirza Delibašić, Sarajevo
Attendance: 7,000
Referees: Igor Dragojević (MNE), Roberto Chiari (ITA), Gentian Cici (ALB)

18 August 2012
19:00

Report

Georgia	80–64	Romania
Scoring by quarter: 24–18, 20–21, 16–10, 20–15
Pts: Pullen 19; Rebs: Sanikidze 10; Asts: Markoishvili 4		Pts: Baciu 19; Rebs: Moldoveanu 11; Asts: Mandache 4

Sports Palace, Tbilisi
Attendance: 6,000
Referees: Antonis Demetriou (CYP), Zdravko Rutešić (MNE), Yair Michaelly (ISR)

18 August 2012
19:30

Report

Netherlands	89–107	Bosnia and Herzegovina
Scoring by quarter: 24–26, 26–25, 14–39, 25–17
Pts: de Jong 16; Rebs: Norel 9 Asts: Slagter 3		Pts: Teletović 33; Rebs: Đedović 7 Asts: Wright 5

Topsportcentrum Almere, Almere
Attendance: 100
Referees: Robert Vyklicky (CZE), Jakub Zamojski (POL), Simon Unsworth (ENG)

21 August 2012
20:00

Report

Bosnia and Herzegovina	95–96	Georgia
Scoring by quarter: 9–28, 29–26, 34–23, 23–19
Pts: Teletović 27; Rebs: Wright 13; Asts: Wright 15		Pts: Pullen 20; Rebs: Sanikidze 11; Asts: Tsintsadze 7

Dvorana Mirza Delibašić, Sarajevo
Attendance: 6,000
Referees: Ivo Dolinek (CZE), Recep Ankarali (TUR), Tomasz Trawicki (POL)

21 August 2012
20:30

Report

Latvia	85–70	Netherlands
Scoring by quarter: 22–22, 18–14, 20–15, 25–19
Pts: Kuksiks 28; Rebs: Bertāns 7 Asts: Bertāns 4		Pts: Norel 16; Rebs: Elson, Norel 6 Asts: Jansen 7

Arena Riga, Riga
Attendance: 2,200
Referees: Luis Lopes (POR), Petr Hrusa (CZE), Piotr Pastusiak (POL)

24 August 2012
18:00

Report

Romania	79–84	Bosnia and Herzegovina
Scoring by quarter: 22–25, 10–27, 25–23, 22–9
Pts: Moldoveanu 25; Rebs: Moldoveanu 11; Asts: Mandache 6		Pts: Teletović, Kikanović 21; Rebs: Teletović 9 Asts: Wright 8

Transilvania Hall, Sibiu
Attendance: 1,500
Referees: Ioannis Foufis (GRE), Haydn Jones (WAL), Vladimir Tsekov (BUL)

24 August 2012
19:00

Report

Georgia	79–76	Latvia
Scoring by quarter: 21–20, 20–16, 23–17, 15–23
Pts: Markoishvili 19; Rebs: Pachulia 9 Asts: Tsintsadze 7		Pts: Strēlnieks 22; Rebs: Bērziņš 11; Asts: Bertāns 3

Sports Palace, Tbilisi
Attendance: 9,000
Referees: Christos Christodoulou (GRE), Ersan Kartal (TUR), Siniša Herceg (CRO)

27 August 2012
19:30

Report

Netherlands	91–88	Georgia
Scoring by quarter: 15–19, 24–28, 25–20, 27–21
Pts: Jansen 24; Rebs: Elson 8 Asts: Jansen 7		Pts: Pachulia 23; Rebs: Pachulia, Shengelia 9 Asts: Tsintsadze, Markoishvili 3

Topsportcentrum Almere, Almere
Attendance: 600
Referees: Francisco Araña (ESP), Janusz Calik (POL), Chris Dodds (SCO)

27 August 2012
20:30

Report

Latvia	89–53	Romania
Scoring by quarter: 21–14, 28–15, 21–10, 19–14
Pts: Kuksiks 19; Rebs: Freimanis, Šeļakovs 6 Asts: Jeromanovs 3		Pts: Mandache 14; Rebs: Nicoara 8 Asts: Mandache 3

Arena Riga, Riga
Attendance: 2,000
Referees: David Chambon (FRA), Mindaugas Vecerskis (LTU), Semen Ovinov (RUS)

30 August 2012
19:30

Report

Netherlands	80–74	Romania
Scoring by quarter: 15–12, 16–18, 21–18, 28–26
Pts: Smeulders 18; Rebs: Smeulders 14; Asts: Jansen 6		Pts: Moldoveanu 21; Rebs: Nicoara 9 Asts: Calota, Paul 3

Topsportcentrum Almere, Almere
Attendance: 630
Referees: Boris Schmidt (GER), Ersan Kartal (TUR), Sigmundur Herbertsson (ISL)

30 August 2012
19:35

Report

Latvia	80–64	Bosnia and Herzegovina
Scoring by quarter: 16–19, 26–11, 24–19, 14–15
Pts: Bertāns 25; Rebs: Bertāns 9 Asts: Bertāns 6		Pts: Đedović, Wright 16; Rebs: Wright, Peršić 7 Asts: Wright 4

Arena Riga, Riga
Attendance: 2,200
Referees: Damir Javor (SLO), Marcin Kowalski (POL), Zoltan Palla (HUN)

2 September 2012
18:00

Report

Romania	74–91	Georgia
Scoring by quarter: 21–24, 18–23, 20–22, 15–22
Pts: Mandache 22; Rebs: Nicoara 11; Asts: three players 4		Pts: Shengelia 23; Rebs: Shengelia 10; Asts: Tsintsadze 8

Transilvania Hall, Sibiu
Attendance: 1,500
Referees: Mehmet Keseratar (TUR), Seffi Shemmesh (ISR), Nikolaos Somos (GRE)

2 September 2012
20:00

Report

Bosnia and Herzegovina	99–83	Netherlands
Scoring by quarter: 28–14, 22–15, 15–32, 35–15
Pts: Teletović 36; Rebs: Kikanović 10; Asts: Wright 9		Pts: Smeulders 21; Rebs: Smeulders 15; Asts: Jansen 8

Dvorana Mirza Delibašić, Sarajevo
Attendance: 3,000
Referees: Christos Christodoulou (GRE), Aleksandar Milojević (MKD), Dariusz Szczerba (POL)

5 September 2012
17:00

Report

Georgia	103–107	Bosnia and Herzegovina
Scoring by quarter: 16–20, 27–20, 31–32, 29–35
Pts: Markoishvili 23; Rebs: Pachulia 11; Asts: Tsintsadze 6		Pts: Teletović 25; Rebs: Sinanović 7 Asts: Wright 6

Sports Palace, Tbilisi
Attendance: 9,000
Referees: Milija Vojinović (SRB), Borys Ryzhyk (UKR), Zafer Yilmaz (TUR)

5 September 2012
19:30

Report

Netherlands	81–86	Latvia
Scoring by quarter: 17–33, 17–16, 22–19, 25–18
Pts: Norel 24; Rebs: Norel 10; Asts: Jansen 4		Pts: Bērziņš 21; Rebs: Bērziņš 8 Asts: Jeromanovs, Kuksiks 4

Topsportcentrum Almere, Almere
Attendance: 850
Referees: Petri Mäntylä (FIN), Mauro Pozzana (ITA), Sérgio Silva (POR)

8 September 2012
17:05

Report

Latvia	70–73	Georgia
Scoring by quarter: 13–7, 11–24, 21–17, 25–25
Pts: Bērziņš, Bertāns 15; Rebs: Meiers 8 Asts: Strēlnieks 6		Pts: Markoishvili 17; Rebs: Sanikidze 9 Asts: Pullen 4

Arena Riga, Riga
Attendance: 4,500
Referees: Ilija Belošević (SRB), Eddie Viator (FRA), Aare Halliko (EST)

8 September 2012
20:00

Report

Bosnia and Herzegovina	93–58	Romania
Scoring by quarter: 25–12, 32–12, 21–20, 15–14
Pts: Teletović 15; Rebs: Teletović 8 Asts: Wright 8		Pts: Dragusin 17; Rebs: Jucan 8 Asts: Paul 4

Dvorana Mirza Delibašić, Sarajevo
Attendance: 6,000
Referees: Emin Mogulkoc (TUR), Georgios Tanatzis (GRE), Siniša Herceg (CRO)

11 September 2012
18:00

Report

Romania	77–85	Latvia
Scoring by quarter: 16–27, 18–17, 20–21, 23–20
Pts: Silvasan 19; Rebs: Dragusin, Moldoveanu 6 Asts: Andrei 4		Pts: Strēlnieks 14; Rebs: Bērziņš 5 Asts: Strēlnieks 8

Transilvania Hall, Sibiu
Attendance: 1,000
Referees: Srdan Dozai (CRO), Aliaksandr Syrytsa (BLR), Aytug Ekti (TUR)

11 September 2012
19:00

Report

Georgia	97–89	Netherlands
Scoring by quarter: 25–21, 29–22, 18–16, 25–30
Pts: Pullen 23; Rebs: Sanikidze 13; Asts: Tsintsadze 6		Pts: Smeulders 22; Rebs: Smeulders 13; Asts: Jansen 6

Sports Palace, Tbilisi
Attendance: 9,000
Referees: Sreten Radovic (CRO), Gili Cohen (ISR), Serkan Emlek (TUR)

=== Group E ===
Team	Pld	W	L	PF	PA	Diff	Pts	Tie-break
Poland	8	6	2	704	568	+136	14	1–1 (+3)
Finland	8	6	2	717	572	+145	14	1–1 (−3)
Belgium	8	5	3	618	545	+73	13	
Switzerland	8	3	5	570	670	−100	11	
Albania	8	0	8	495	749	−254	8	

All times are local

15 August 2012
20:15

Report

Poland	57–64	Belgium
Scoring by quarter: 21–17, 12–16, 7–16, 17–15
Pts: Gortat 23; Rebs: Gortat 9 Asts: Koszarek 4		Pts: Van Rossom 13; Rebs: Muya, De Zeeuw 7 Asts: Van Rossom, Muya 3

Ergo Arena, Sopot
Attendance: 7,500
Referees: Milivoje Jovcic (SRB), Borys Ryzhyk (UKR), Gintaras Vitkauskas (LTU)

15 August 2012
20:30

Report

Albania	51–76	Switzerland
Scoring by quarter: 10–20, 17–19, 15–22, 9–15
Pts: Luca 12; Rebs: Hysenagolli 8 Asts: Karaj 5		Pts: Mladjan 24; Rebs: Brunner 11; Asts: Mladjan, Petkovic 4

Asllan Rusi, Tirana
Attendance: 1,000
Referees: Ademir Zurapovic (BIH), Petar Denkovski (MKD), Tamas Benczur (HUN)

17 August 2012
19:00

Report

Finland	112–77	Albania
Scoring by quarter: 37–18, 24–12, 29–30, 22–17
Pts: Koponen 29; Rebs: Kaunisto, Lee 7 Asts: Koponen 4		Pts: Shima 23; Rebs: Shima 10; Asts: Shima, Ndoja 3

Helsinki Ice Hall, Helsinki
Attendance: 2,920
Referees: Benjamin Barth (GER), Arnis Ozols (LAT), Mart Uuehendrik (EST)

18 August 2012
17:30

Report

Switzerland	66–80	Poland
Scoring by quarter: 19–23, 13–17, 12–21, 22–19
Pts: Mladjan 14; Rebs: Ramseyer 9 Asts: Mladjan 5		Pts: Gortat 17; Rebs: Gortat 11; Asts: Koszarek 5

Site Sportif Saint-Leonard, Fribourg
Attendance: 1,300
Referees: Vicente Bulto (ESP), Andrej Lovsin (SLO), Carlos Santos (POR)

21 August 2012
20:15

Report

Poland	79–81	Finland
Scoring by quarter: 22–22, 18–20, 20–18, 19–21
Pts: Ignerski 22; Rebs: Gortat 11; Asts: Koszarek 6		Pts: Koponen 26; Rebs: Kotti 8 Asts: Koponen 5

Hala Koszalin, Koszalin
Attendance: 3,000
Referees: Luigi Lamonica (ITA), Mindaugas Vecerskis (LTU), Haris Bijedic (BIH)

21 August 2012
20:30

Report

Belgium	98–49	Switzerland
Scoring by quarter: 27–8, 25–21, 19–13, 27–7
Pts: Tabu-Eboma 18; Rebs: De Zeeuw 6 Asts: Van Rossom 6		Pts: Ramseyer 13; Rebs: Ramseyer 6 Asts: Mladjan, Louissaint 2

Lotto Arena, Antwerp
Attendance: 4,000
Referees: Milan Mazic (SRB), Georgios Tanatzis (GRE), Csaba Cziffra (HUN)

24 August 2012
19:00

Report

Finland	97–60	Belgium
Scoring by quarter: 19–18, 18–14, 29–11, 31–17
Pts: Koponen 21; Rebs: Kotti 6 Asts: Koponen 8		Pts: Van Rossom 11; Rebs: Driesen 6 Asts: Muya 3

Helsinki Ice Hall, Helsinki
Attendance: 4,020
Referees: Eddie Viator (FRA), Apostolos Kalpakas (SWE), Moritz Reiter (GER)

24 August 2012
20:30

Report

Albania	67–105	Poland
Scoring by quarter: 19–28, 14–28, 16–14, 18–35
Pts: Ndoja 16; Rebs: Hysenagolli 7 Asts: three players 3		Pts: Ponitka 17; Rebs: Gortat 8 Asts: Koszarek 6

Asllan Rusi, Tirana
Attendance: 400
Referees: Dubravko Muhvic (CRO), Anastasios Manos (GRE), Milos Koljensic (MNE)

27 August 2012
20:30

Report

Switzerland	60–89	Finland
Scoring by quarter: 19–26, 10–23, 8–18, 23–22
Pts: Vogt 13; Rebs: Vogt 8 Asts: Stockalper 3		Pts: Möttölä 17; Rebs: Kotti 6 Asts: Salin 4

Site Sportif Saint-Leonard, Fribourg
Attendance: 500
Referees: Ilija Belosevic (SRB), Alessandro Martolini (ITA), Alexander Eger (AUT)

27 August 2012
20:30

Report

Belgium	97–59	Albania
Scoring by quarter: 22–13, 30–9, 21–23, 24–14
Pts: Van Rossom 19; Rebs: three players 6 Asts: Van Rossom 9		Pts: Ndoja 16; Rebs: Shima 13; Asts: Shima 4

Lotto Arena, Antwerp
Attendance: 4,000
Referees: Jose Martin (ESP), Ingus Baumanis (LAT), Ognjen Jokic (MNE)

30 August 2012
20:00

Report

Switzerland	93–84	Albania
Scoring by quarter: 24–15, 26–20, 15–27, 28–22
Pts: Petkovic 25; Rebs: Dubas 10; Asts: Petkovic 8		Pts: Shima 29; Rebs: Hysenagolli 19; Asts: Karaj 6

Site Sportif Saint-Leonard, Fribourg
Attendance: 350
Referees: Paolo Taurino (ITA), Vaclav Lukes (CZE), Bernard Vassallo (MLT)

30 August 2012
20:30

Report

Belgium	73–87	Poland
Scoring by quarter: 22–26, 23–16, 20–20, 8–25
Pts: Tabu-Eboma 18; Rebs: Van Rossom 5 Asts: Muya, Tabu-Eboma 3		Pts: Gortat 29; Rebs: Gortat 10; Asts: Koszarek 6

Lotto Arena, Antwerp
Attendance: 4,300
Referees: Fernando Rocha (POR), Anton Makhlin (RUS), Joseph Bissang (FRA)

2 September 2012
20:15

Report

Poland	111–67	Switzerland
Scoring by quarter: 32–16, 24–16, 28–26, 27–9
Pts: Gortat 31; Rebs: Gortat 13; Asts: Skibniewski 6		Pts: Mladjan 20; Rebs: Dubas 10; Asts: Petković 5

Centrum Rekreacyjno-Sportowe, Zielona Góra
Attendance: 4,800
Referees: Aleksandar Glisic (SRB), Petr Hrusa (CZE), Milan Brziak (SVK)

2 September 2012
20:30

Report

Albania	52–95	Finland
Scoring by quarter: 17–21, 15–20, 9–30, 11–24
Pts: Hysenagolli 27; Rebs: Shima 15; Asts: Karaj, Shima 4		Pts: Huff 23; Rebs: three players 6 Asts: Koponen 7

Asllan Rusi, Tirana
Attendance: 500
Referees: Panagiotis Anastopoulos (GRE), Tomislav Vovk (CRO), Uros Obrknezevic (SRB)

5 September 2012
19:00

Report

Finland	91–96	Poland
Scoring by quarter: 24–16, 26–27, 22–26, 19–27
Pts: Lee 20; Rebs: Kotti 6 Asts: Koponen 6		Pts: Gortat 27; Rebs: Gortat 21; Asts: Berisha 5

Helsinki Ice Hall, Helsinki
Attendance: 6,540
Referees: Olegs Latisevs (LAT), Sergey Mikhaylov (RUS), Keith Williams (ENG)

5 September 2012
20:00

Report

Switzerland	82–73	Belgium
Scoring by quarter: 26–21, 19–16, 14–14, 23–22
Pts: Petkovic 25; Rebs: Dubas 9 Asts: three players 3		Pts: Beghin, Tabu-Eboma 17; Rebs: Van Rossom, Beghin 5 Asts: five players 3

Site Sportif Saint-Leonard, Fribourg
Attendance: 350
Referees: Marko Juras (SRB), Matej Spendl (SLO), Simon Unsworth (ENG)

8 September 2012
20:15

Report

Poland	89–59	Albania
Scoring by quarter: 18–19, 24–15, 20–8, 27–17
Pts: Gortat 18; Rebs: Gortat 10; Asts: Skibniewski 7		Pts: Ndoja 18; Rebs: Shima 11; Asts: Karaj 4

Hala Globus, Lublin
Attendance: 4,000
Referees: Marco Giansanti (ITA), Tonci Anzulovic (CRO), Paul Walton (ENG)

8 September 2012
20:30

Report

Belgium	71–68	Finland
Scoring by quarter: 19–28, 25–10, 15–8, 12–22
Pts: Mukubu 20; Rebs: Beghin, De Zeeuw 7 Asts: Beghin 3		Pts: Koponen 22; Rebs: Kaunisto 9 Asts: Koponen 4

Lotto Arena, Antwerp
Attendance: 3,200
Referees: Milivoje Jovcic (SRB), Nicolas Maestre (FRA), Andris Aunkrogers (LAT)

11 September 2012
19:00

Report

Finland	84–77	Switzerland
Scoring by quarter: 13–19, 28–21, 14–19, 29–18
Pts: Koponen 24; Rebs: Lee 7 Asts: Salin 5		Pts: Mladjan 23; Rebs: Dubas 13; Asts: Stockalper 5

Helsinki Ice Hall, Helsinki
Attendance: 4,431
Referees: Boris Schmidt (GER), Ingus Baumanis (LAT), Fedja Serhatlic (SWE)

11 September 2012
20:30

Report

Albania	46–82	Belgium
Scoring by quarter: 11–21, 13–20, 17–22, 5–19
Pts: Ndoja 14; Rebs: Shima 9 Asts: Karaj 3		Pts: De Zeeuw 20; Rebs: De Zeeuw 10; Asts: Tabu-Eboma 5

Asllan Rusi, Tirana
Attendance: 100
Referees: Radomir Vojinovic (MNE), Sergiy Zashchuk (UKR), Josip Radojkovic (CRO)

=== Group F ===
Team	Pld	W	L	PF	PA	Diff	Pts	Tie-break
Italy	8	8	0	638	496	+142	16	
Turkey	8	5	3	617	568	+49	13	1–1 (+5)
Czech Republic	8	5	3	565	551	+14	13	1–1 (–5)
Belarus	8	2	6	553	626	−73	10	
Portugal	8	0	8	523	655	−132	8	

All times are local

15 August 2012
19:30

Report

Belarus	65–73	Czech Republic
Scoring by quarter: 18–19, 12–20, 23–14, 12–20
Pts: Kudrautsau 16; Rebs: Ulyanko 9 Asts: Kudrautsau 4		Pts: Jelínek 16; Rebs: Bartoň 9 Asts: Satoranský 9

Palace of Sports, Minsk
Attendance: 1,600
Referees: Tomasz Trawicki (POL), Lahdo Sharro (SWE), Johannes Sarekoski (FIN)

15 August 2012
20:30

Report

Italy	97–45	Portugal
Scoring by quarter: 24–7, 26–13, 25–9, 22–16
Pts: Aradori 21; Rebs: Gallinari 9 Asts: five players 3		Pts: Gomes 9 Rebs: Gomes 8 Asts: Minhava, Oliveira 2

Palasport Serradimigni - Sassari, Sassari
Attendance: 2,212
Referees: Miguel Perez Perez (ESP), David Chambon (FRA), Siniša Herceg (CRO)

18 August 2012
20:00

Report

Turkey	77–74	Belarus
Scoring by quarter: 19–18, 17–18, 24–12, 17–26
Pts: Erden 20; Rebs: Erden 6 Asts: Preldžić 5		Pts: Kudrautsau 21; Rebs: Ulyanko 5 Asts: Kudrautsau 5

Ankara Arena, Ankara
Attendance: 4,573
Referees: Antonio Conde (ESP), Marek Cmikiewicz (POL), Petar Obradovic (BIH)

18 August 2012
20:30

Report

Czech Republic	53–63	Italy
Scoring by quarter: 19–17, 10–18, 8–9, 16–19
Pts: Houška 14; Rebs: Houška 8 Asts: Satoranský 5		Pts: Gallinari 13; Rebs: Cinciarini 8 Asts: Gallinari 3

City Sports Hall, Chomutov
Attendance: 1,735
Referees: Christos Christodoulou (GRE), Grzegorz Ziemblicki (POL), Anton Makhlin (RUS)

21 August 2012
20:30

Report

Italy	78–69	Turkey
Scoring by quarter: 14–18, 18–18, 19–19, 27–14
Pts: Datome 23; Rebs: Gallinari 11; Asts: Datome, Hackett 3		Pts: Preldžić, Karaman 14; Rebs: Erden 10; Asts: Preldžić 4

Palasport Serradimigni - Sassari, Sassari
Attendance: 4,000
Referees: Juan Arteaga (ESP), Ilija Belosevic (SRB), Sreten Radovic (CRO)

21 August 2012
20:30

Report

Portugal	67–74	Czech Republic
Scoring by quarter: 10–24, 24–19, 12–15, 21–16
Pts: Silva 20; Rebs: Cunha 7 Asts: Barroso 5		Pts: Benda 18; Rebs: Satoranský 10; Asts: Satoranský 9

Complexo Dos Desportos Cidade De Almada, Feijó
Attendance: 1,500
Referees: Dubravko Muhvic (CRO), Francisco Araña (ESP), Francis Santos (GIB)

24 August 2012
19:30

Report

Belarus	63–84	Italy
Scoring by quarter: 16–22, 17–17, 10–19, 20–26
Pts: Kudrautsau 19; Rebs: Trastsinetski, Parakhouski 5 Asts: Kudrautsau 5		Pts: Datome 22; Rebs: Cusin, Datome 6 Asts: Cinciarini 4

Palace of Sports, Minsk
Attendance: 1,600
Referees: Olegs Latisevs (LAT), Oliver Krause (GER), Roman Ponomarenko (UKR)

24 August 2012
20:00

Report

Turkey	74–62	Portugal
Scoring by quarter: 17–17, 25–14, 20–16, 12–15
Pts: Erden 19; Rebs: Karaman 7 Asts: Arslan 6		Pts: Gomes 19; Rebs: Fonseca 10; Asts: Fernandes 3

Ankara Arena, Ankara
Attendance: 9,780
Referees: Vicente Bulto (ESP), Marko Juras (SRB), Igor Dragojevic (MNE)

27 August 2012
20:15

Report

Czech Republic	82–64	Turkey
Scoring by quarter: 21–19, 14–11, 22–18, 25–16
Pts: Satoranský 16; Rebs: Benda 10; Asts: Benda, Satoranský 5		Pts: Erden, Gönlüm 13; Rebs: Erden 7 Asts: Preldžić 6

City Sports Hall, Chomutov
Attendance: 2,200
Referees: Robert Lottermoser (GER), Milan Mazic (SRB), Tomislav Hordov (CRO)

27 August 2012
20:30

Report

Portugal	75–82	Belarus
Scoring by quarter: 15–28, 22–16, 20–14, 18–24
Pts: Fernandes 19; Rebs: Gomes 7 Asts: Fernandes 4		Pts: Parakhouski 19; Rebs: Kudrautsau 6 Asts: Kudrautsau 9

Sports Hall Multiusos de Fafe, Fafe
Attendance: 500
Referees: Daniel Hierrezuelo (ESP), Keith Williams (ENG), Csaba Cziffra (HUN)

30 August 2012
17:45

Report

Czech Republic	79–72	Belarus
Scoring by quarter: 16–26, 15–10, 26–16, 22–21
Pts: Bartoň 23; Rebs: Bartoň 10; Asts: Welsch 9		Pts: Parakhouski 15; Rebs: Korshuk, Parakhouski 6 Asts: Kudrautsau 6

City Sports Hall, Chomutov
Attendance: 1,850
Referees: Srdan Dozai (CRO), Igor Mitrovski (MKD), Dragan Kralj (BIH)

30 August 2012
20:30

Report

Portugal	70–82	Italy
Scoring by quarter: 9–22, 10–16, 23–21, 28–23
Pts: Gomes 22; Rebs: Gomes 10; Asts: three players 3		Pts: Gallinari 18; Rebs: Datome 6 Asts: four players 2

Pavilhão Multiusos de Coimbra, Coimbra
Attendance: 500
Referees: Antonio Conde (ESP), Nicolas Maestre (FRA), Neil Wilkinson (ENG)

2 September 2012
19:30

Report

Belarus	62–91	Turkey
Scoring by quarter: 15–25, 14–24, 23–20, 10–22
Pts: Parakhouski, Kudrautsau 18; Rebs: Parakhouski 6 Asts: three players 3		Pts: Erden 20; Rebs: Erden 9 Asts: Preldžić 8

Palace of Sports, Minsk
Attendance: 2,500
Referees: Grzegorz Ziemblicki (POL), Mindaugas Vecerskis (LTU), Oskars Lucis (LAT)

2 September 2012
20:30

Report

Italy	68–56	Czech Republic
Scoring by quarter: 20–14, 22–12, 15–12, 11–18
Pts: Aradori 14; Rebs: Aradori 6 Asts: Mancinelli 4		Pts: Benda 12; Rebs: Benda 9 Asts: Welsch 5

Palatrieste, Trieste
Attendance: 4,000
Referees: Milivoje Jovcic (SRB), Renaud Geller (BEL), Barry Peters (NED)

5 September 2012
20:00

Report

Turkey	82–83	Italy
Scoring by quarter: 21–17, 23–14, 18–25, 20–27
Pts: Erden 14; Rebs: Erden 6 Asts: Arslan 5		Pts: Gallinari 19; Rebs: Gallinari 6 Asts: Cinciarini 3

Kadir Has Spor Salonu, Kayseri
Attendance: 6,250
Referees: Srdan Dozai (CRO), Aleksandar Glisic (SRB), Gili Cohen (ISR)

5 September 2012
20:00

Report

Czech Republic	90–71	Portugal
Scoring by quarter: 21–24, 32–12, 13–19, 24–16
Pts: Jelínek 25; Rebs: Benda 6 Asts: Pumprla, Welsch 6		Pts: Santos 19; Rebs: Cunha 8 Asts: Fernandes 7

City Sports Hall, Chomutov
Attendance: 2,000
Referees: Matej Boltauzer (SLO), Ingus Baumanis (LAT), Miodrag Licina (SRB)

8 September 2012
20:30

Report

Portugal	69–79	Turkey
Scoring by quarter: 21–17, 10–18, 21–12, 17–32
Pts: Fonseca 20; Rebs: Fonseca, Gomes 8 Asts: Fernandes 6		Pts: Karaman 21; Rebs: Karaman 11; Asts: Balbay 4

Pavilhão Multiusos de Coimbra, Coimbra
Attendance: 600
Referees: Oliver Krause (GER), Renaud Geller (BEL), Marius Ciulin (ROU)

8 September 2012
20:30

Report

Italy	83–58	Belarus
Scoring by quarter: 23–15, 25–17, 16–12, 19–14
Pts: Gallinari 16; Rebs: Gallinari 12; Asts: Cinciarini 4		Pts: Kudrautsau 12; Rebs: Korshuk, Trastsinetski 5 Asts: Stiggers 6

Palatrieste, Trieste
Attendance: 4,000
Referees: Robert Lottermoser (GER), Tomasz Trawicki (POL), Ognjen Jokic (MNE)

11 September 2012
19:30

Report

Belarus	77–64	Portugal
Scoring by quarter: 21–15, 17–17, 16–19, 23–13
Pts: Pustahvar 21; Rebs: Parakhouski 8 Asts: Kudrautsau 9		Pts: Fonseca 22; Rebs: three players 8 Asts: Fernandes 10

Palace of Sports, Minsk
Attendance: 1,100
Referees: Jurgis Laurinavicius (LTU), Evgeny Vetrov (RUS), Andris Aunkrogers (LAT)

11 September 2012
19:00

Report

Turkey	81–58	Czech Republic
Scoring by quarter: 25–17, 19–9, 21–14, 16–18
Pts: Erden 21; Rebs: Erden 11; Asts: Preldžić 6		Pts: Satoranský 15; Rebs: three players 6 Asts: Pumprla 3

Ülker Sports Arena, Istanbul
Attendance: 9,340
Referees: Damir Javor (SLO), Milija Vojinovic (SRB), Tomislav Vovk (CRO)

=== Ranking of third-placed teams ===
The four best third-placed teams from the groups qualified automatically for the tournament. As some groups contain six teams and some five, winning percentage is used.

Team	Pld	W	L	PF	PA	G.AVG	PCT
Belgium	8	5	3	618	545	1.133	.625
Latvia	8	5	3	655	584	1.121	.625
Czech Republic	8	5	3	565	551	1.025	.625
Serbia	10	6	4	846	721	1.173	.600
Bulgaria	8	4	4	669	647	1.034	.500
Austria	8	3	5	601	589	1.020	.375
