= FIBA EuroBasket 2009 qualification =

This page describes the qualification procedure for EuroBasket 2009.

== Qualified teams ==
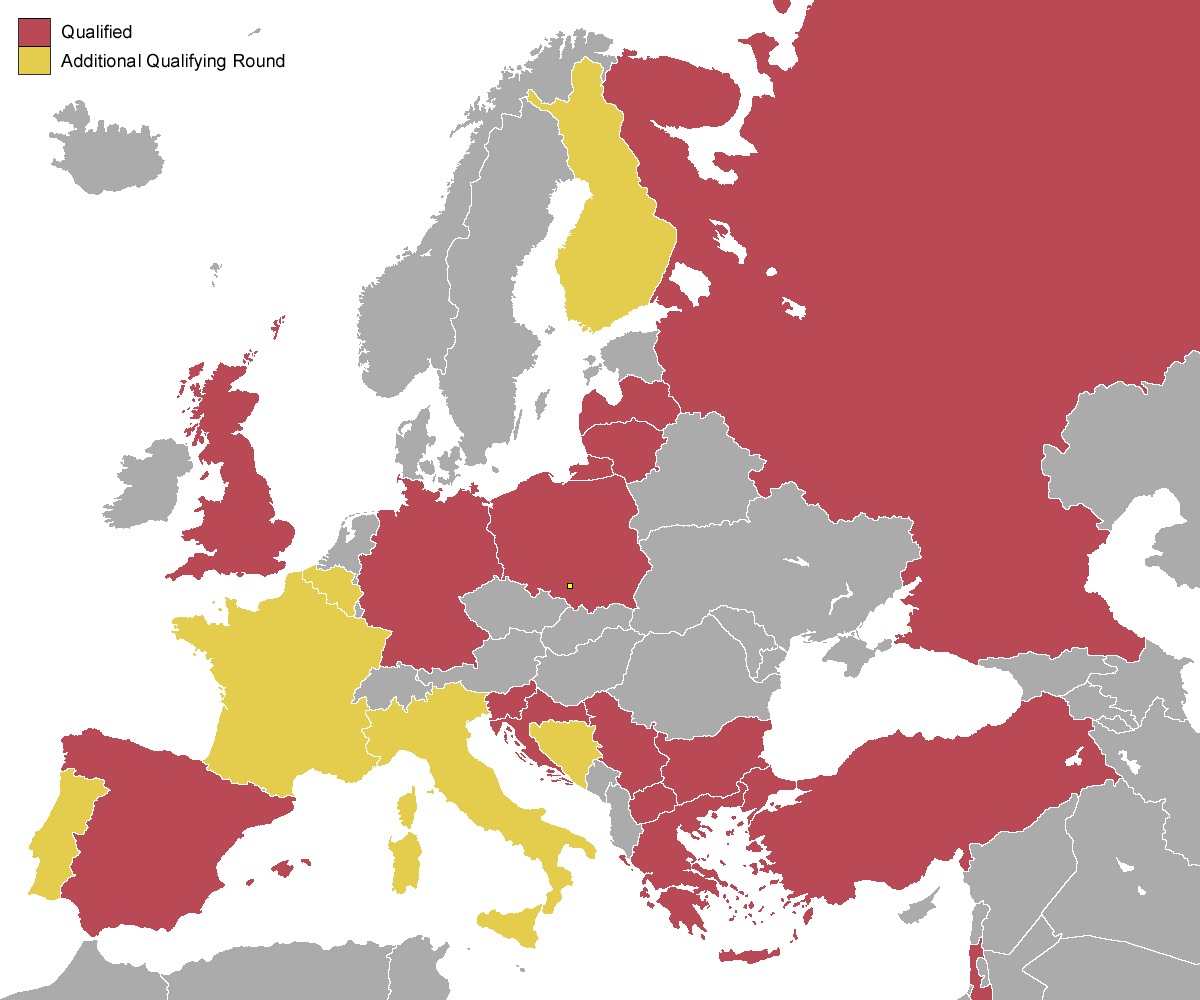
Countries that qualified for EuroBasket 2009 (red) and for the Additional Qualifying Round (yellow)

Eight teams have secured their places at the EuroBasket 2009 before the qualifications. Seven teams have qualified through the qualifying round, and one more team has qualified through the Additional Qualifying Round.

Qualified as the host nation:

- Poland

Qualified through the participation at the 2008 Summer Olympics

- Lithuania
- Russia
- Spain

Qualified through the participation at the FIBA World Olympic Qualifying Tournament 2008

- Croatia
- Germany
- Greece
- Slovenia

Qualified through the qualifying round

- Bulgaria
- Great Britain
- Israel
- Latvia
- Macedonia
- Serbia
- Turkey

Qualified through the Additional Qualifying Round

- France

== Qualification format ==
The Qualifying Round was held from 20 August to 20 September 2008. The draw for the qualifying round was held on 16 February 2008 in Venice, Italy. There were four groups, one group of five teams and three groups of four teams. The first team from each group and the three best second placed teams have qualified for EuroBasket 2009. The qualified teams were: Bulgaria, Great Britain, Israel, Latvia, Macedonia, Serbia and Turkey.

The best six of the remaining teams then went to the Additional Qualifying Round, which has been held from 5 to 30 August 2009, shortly before the start of the final Round. The teams qualified for the Additional Qualifying Round were: Belgium, Bosnia and Herzegovina, Finland, France, Italy and Portugal. These six teams were divided in two groups of three teams each. After that, the winners of the groups, Belgium and France, have played each other for the last place in EuroBasket 2009, with France winning the two-leg match.

The last four teams have played in the Relegation Round, which was held from 5 to 20 August 2009. The teams qualified for the Relegation Round were: Czech Republic, Estonia, Hungary and Ukraine. The bottom two of these four teams, Czech Republic and Estonia, have been relegated to EuroBasket Division B championship. The two teams on top of the group, Hungary and Ukraine, have stayed in EuroBasket Division A.

The draw for the groups of the final Round as well as for the order of the games of the Additional Qualifying Round and the Relegation Round was held in Warsaw, Poland on 8 November 2008.

EuroBasket 2009 was held from 7 to 20 September 2009.

== Qualifying round ==
=== Draw seedings ===
Pot 1	Pot 2	Pot 3	Pot 4
France; Italy; Portugal; Israel	Turkey; Latvia; Serbia; Czech Republic	Macedonia; Bosnia and Herzegovina; Ukraine; Bulgaria	Estonia; Belgium; Hungary; Finland; Great Britain

=== Qualification groups ===
The draw for the qualifying round was held on 16 February 2008 in Venice, Italy.

Group A	Group B	Group C	Group D
Italy; Serbia; Bulgaria; Hungary; Finland	Portugal; Latvia; Macedonia; Estonia	France; Turkey; Ukraine; Belgium	Israel; Czech Republic; Bosnia and Herzegovina; Great Britain

=== Group A ===
Qualified for the final Tournament
Qualified for the Additional Qualifying Round
Qualified for the Relegation Round

Team	Pts	W	L	PF	PA	Diff
Serbia	15	7	1	663	524	+139
Bulgaria	12	4	4	670	639	+31
Italy	12	4	4	574	590	−16
Finland	11	3	5	613	655	−42
Hungary	10	2	6	552	664	−112

Note: All times are local

20 August 2008
20:30

Game 1

Italy	64–78	Serbia
Scoring by quarter: 18–26, 16–12, 17–19, 13–21
Pts: Mordente 18; Rebs: Datome 6 Asts: Mordente 3		Pts: Vujanić 16; Rebs: Veličković 11; Asts: Teodosić 4

PalaRockefeller, Cagliari
Attendance: 4,000
Referees: Christos Mastraftsis (Greece), Daniel Hierrezuelo (Spain), Joseph Bissang (France)

20 August 2008
18:00

Game 2

Bulgaria	89–71	Hungary
Scoring by quarter: 24–16, 23–24, 21–24, 21–7
Pts: Jaaber 23; Rebs: D. Ivanov 12; Asts: Videnov 5		Pts: Sitku 15; Rebs: Németh 6 Asts: B. Simon 4

Universiada Hall, Sofia
Attendance: 2,500
Referees: Marjan Stojovski (Republic of Macedonia), Recep Ankaralı (Turkey), Marius Ciulin (Romania)

23 August 2008
19:00

Game 3

Finland	68–90	Bulgaria
Scoring by quarter: 10–19, 24–20, 19–25, 15–26
Pts: Möttölä 21; Rebs: Möttölä, Muurinen 5 Asts: Koponen 4		Pts: D, Ivanov 24; Rebs: Georgiev, Jaaber 7 Asts: Videnov 5

Energia Areena, Vantaa
Attendance: 1,974
Referees: Lahdo Sharro (Sweden), Tomas Jasevicius (Lithuania), Olegs Latisevs (Latvia)

23 August 2008
18:00

Game 4

Hungary	68–64	Italy
Scoring by quarter: 20–23, 22–10, 11–22, 15–9
Pts: Báder 15; Rebs: Báder 11; Asts: Németh, B. Simon 3		Pts: Amoroso 21; Rebs: Amoroso 8 Asts: Poeta 5

Tiszaligeti Sports Hall, Szolnok
Attendance: 2,000
Referees: Ivan Zachara (Czech Republic), Igor Poljanšek (Slovenia), Robert Lottermoser (Germany)

27 August 2008
18:00

Game 5

Serbia	94–60	Hungary
Scoring by quarter: 27–17, 17–15, 19–20, 31–8
Pts: Erceg 15; Rebs: Marković 5 Asts: Teodosić 5		Pts: Báder 16; Rebs: Báder 12; Asts: B. Simon, Fodor, Németh 2

Belgrade Arena, Belgrade
Attendance: 18,000
Referees: Engin Kennerman (Turkey), Ademir Zurapović (Bosnia and Herzegovina), Aleksandar Milojeviḱ (Republic of Macedonia)

27 August 2008
18:00

Game 6

Italy	88–80	Finland
Scoring by quarter: 18–15, 23–21, 21–18, 26–26
Pts: Poeta 20; Rebs: Mancinelli, Bulleri 6 Asts: Poeta, Mordente, Bulleri 1		Pts: Möttölä 20; Rebs: Kotti 9 Asts: Koponen 1

Palasport Tricalle, Chieti
Attendance: 3,000
Referees: Marko Vučkovič (Slovenia), Miguel Angel Perez Niz (Spain), Sergio Silva (Portugal)

30 August 2008
18:00

Game 7

Bulgaria	81–80	Italy
Scoring by quarter: 25–23, 16–19, 22–18, 18–20
Pts: Videnov 21; Rebs: Stoykov 8 Asts: D. Ivanov, Videnov, Angelov, Stoykov 3		Pts: Bulleri 18; Rebs: Datome 9 Asts: Vitali 4

Universiada Hall, Sofia
Attendance: 3,500
Referees: Lazaros Voreadis (Greece), Mehmet Keseratar (Turkey), Sergiy Zashchuk (Ukraine)

30 August 2008
20:00

Game 8

Finland	80–77	Serbia
Scoring by quarter: 13–22, 27–17, 21–20, 19–18
Pts: Koponen 18; Rebs: Matinen 4 Asts: Koponen 4		Pts: Krstić 29; Rebs: Erceg 7 Asts: Vujanić 5

Energia Areena, Vantaa
Attendance: 1,682
Referees: Aare Halliko (Estonia), Arnis Ozols (Latvia), Oscar Lefwerth (Sweden)

3 September 2008
18:00

Game 9

Hungary	64–79	Finland
Scoring by quarter: 22–13, 15–22, 12–22, 15–22
Pts: Sitku 20; Rebs: Sitku, Németh 6 Asts: B. Simon 4		Pts: Koponen 17; Rebs: Möttölä 9 Asts: Virtanen 5

City Sports Hall, Salgótarján
Attendance: 1,500
Referees: Siniša Herceg (Croatia), Robert Vyklicky (Czech Republic), Damir Javor (Slovenia)

3 September 2008
20:30

Game 10

Serbia	74–64	Bulgaria
Scoring by quarter: 18–13, 20–13, 18–17, 18–21
Pts: Veličković 20; Rebs: Krstić 6 Asts: Teodosić 7		Pts: Jaaber 12; Rebs: Georgiev 8 Asts: Georgiev 3

Belgrade Arena, Belgrade
Attendance: 15,000
Referees: Shmuel Bachar (Israel), Bojan Jovanić (Bosnia and Herzegovina), Rüstü Nuran (Turkey)

6 September 2008
18:00

Game 11

Serbia	72–52	Italy
Scoring by quarter: 21–11, 17–16, 20–11, 14–14
Pts: Vujanić 13; Rebs: Krstić 9 Asts: Veličković 3		Pts: Poeta 14; Rebs: Amoroso 8 Asts: Cinciarini 2

Belgrade Arena, Belgrade
Attendance: 14,000
Referees: Srđan Dožai (Croatia), Juan Arteaga (Spain), Seffi Shemmesh (Israel)

6 September 2008
18:00

Game 12

Hungary	87–86	Bulgaria
Scoring by quarter: 20–19, 27–24, 23–29, 17–14
Pts: Németh 19; Rebs: Báder 7 Asts: Sitku, Németh 4		Pts: Angelov 21; Rebs: Videnov 7 Asts: Videnov 4

City Sports Hall, Salgótarján
Attendance: 1,500
Referees: Ivo Dolinek (Czech Republic), Milan Brziak (Slovakia), Sreten Radović (Croatia)

10 September 2008
20:30

Game 13

Bulgaria	102–90	Finland
Scoring by quarter: 29–22, 17–25, 26–14, 30–29
Pts: Jaaber 29; Rebs: D. Ivanov, Jaaber 8 Asts: Jaaber 6		Pts: Huff 26; Rebs: Muurinen, Huff, Möttölä 7 Asts: Koponen 6

Universiada Hall, Sofia
Attendance: 3,500
Referees: Volodymyr Drabikovsky (Ukraine), Zoran Zlatevski (Republic of Macedonia), Georgios Tanatzis (Greece)

10 September 2008
20:00

Game 14

Italy	75–68	Hungary
Scoring by quarter: 26–12, 11–15, 18–23, 20–18
Pts: Poeta 15; Rebs: Amoroso 10; Asts: Soragna, Poeta 2		Pts: Németh 19; Rebs: Sitku 6 Asts: Fodor 2

PalaSavelli, Porto San Giorgio
Attendance: 3,500
Referees: Andrej Lovšin (Slovenia), Vicente Bulto (Spain), Dragan Kralj (Bosnia and Herzegovina)

13 September 2008
18:00

Game 15

Hungary	61–89	Serbia
Scoring by quarter: 20–28, 15–28, 14–12, 12–21
Pts: Németh 11; Rebs: Báder 7 Asts: Fodor 5		Pts: Tripković 20; Rebs: Perović 9 Asts: Tepić 8

Arena Savaria, Szombathely
Attendance: 1,500
Referees: Stelian Banica (Romania), Murat Biricik (Turkey), Ioannis Foufis (Greece)

13 September 2008
19:00

Game 16

Finland	62–69	Italy
Scoring by quarter: 16–25, 17–16, 12–10, 17–18
Pts: Muurinen 24; Rebs: Kotti, Muurinen 11; Asts: Koponen 2		Pts: Soragna 18; Rebs: Cittadini 7 Asts: Giachetti 2

Energia Areena, Vantaa
Attendance: 2,764
Referees: Sigmundur Herbertsson (Iceland), Oskars Lucis (Latvia), Juan Carlos Garcia Gonzalez (Spain)

17 September 2008
20:00

Game 17

Italy	82–81	Bulgaria
Scoring by quarter: 23–20, 19–24, 21–13, 19–24
Pts: Poeta 21; Rebs: Cittadini 12; Asts: Poeta 3		Pts: Stoykov 19; Rebs: K. Ivanov 6 Asts: D. Ivanov 6

PalaRuffini, Turin
Attendance: 3,080
Referees: Václav Lukeš (Czech Republic), Zoran Šutulović (Montenegro), Daniel Hierrezuelo (Spain)

17 September 2008
20:30

Game 18

Serbia	92–66	Finland
Scoring by quarter: 18–17, 28–11, 21–24, 25–14
Pts: Erceg 21; Rebs: Erceg 7 Asts: Teodosić 6		Pts: Matinen 12; Rebs: Ulander, Huff, Iisalo 3 Asts: Koponen 3

Belgrade Arena, Belgrade
Attendance: 15,700
Referees: Chrisostomos Schinas (Greece), Matej Boltauzer (Slovenia), Mircea Constantin Serban (Romania)

20 September 2008
19:00

Game 19

Finland	88–73	Hungary
Scoring by quarter: 23–21, 19–21, 28–16, 18–15
Pts: Muurinen 22; Rebs: Kotti 12; Asts: Muurinen, Huff, Kotti, Koponen, Möttölä, Virtanen 1		Pts: Kaman 22; Rebs: Báder 10; Asts: Sitku 3

Energia Areena, Vantaa
Attendance: 1,792
Referees: Lars Klaar (Sweden), Marek Ćmikiewicz (Poland), Borys Shulga (Ukraine)

20 September 2008
21:00

Game 20

Bulgaria	77–87	Serbia
Scoring by quarter: 16–26, 14–23, 22–24, 25–14
Pts: Jaaber 27; Rebs: D. Ivanov 8 Asts: Stoykov, Jaaber 4		Pts: Krstić 17; Rebs: Krstić 9 Asts: Teodosić 4

Universiada Hall, Sofia
Attendance: 3,500
Referees: Grzegorz Ziemblicki (Poland), Konstantinos Mouzakis (Greece), Doru Vinasi (Romania)

=== Group B ===
Qualified for the final Tournament
Qualified for the Additional Qualifying Round
Qualified for the Relegation Round

Team	Pts	W	L	PF	PA	Diff
Macedonia	10	4	2	495	443	+52
Latvia	10	4	2	492	446	+46
Portugal	9	3	3	395	460	−65
Estonia	7	1	5	434	467	−33

Note: All times are local

3 September 2008
18:30

Game 1

Latvia	83–82 (OT)	Macedonia
Scoring by quarter: 15–12, 16–18, 23–24, 20–20, Overtime: 9–8
Pts: Biedriņš 30; Rebs: Biedriņš 22; Asts: K. Valters 4		Pts: V. Stefanov 25; Rebs: Massey 11; Asts: V. Stefanov, Ilievski, Gečevski 3

Arena Riga, Riga
Attendance: 5,000
Referees: Virginijus Dovidavicius (Lithuania), Sergiy Chebyshev (Ukraine), Tomasz Trawicki (Poland)

3 September 2008
20:30

Game 2

Portugal	70–79	Estonia
Scoring by quarter: 17–21, 20–19, 22–13, 11–26
Pts: Andrade 14; Rebs: Marçal 8 Asts: Tavares, Silva, Andrade, Évora 2		Pts: Kullamäe 28; Rebs: Talts 8 Asts: Sokk, Kangur 4

Arena Dolce Vita, Ovar
Attendance: 1,750
Referees: Miguel Perez Perez (Spain), Joseph Bissang (France), Stephen Ellis (England)

6 September 2008
17:00

Game 3

Estonia	81–88	Latvia
Scoring by quarter: 20–14, 18–25, 20–24, 23–25
Pts: Kullamäe 16; Rebs: Kangur 8 Asts: Tein 6		Pts: Janicenoks, Biedriņš 25; Rebs: Biedriņš 9 Asts: K. Valters 7

Saku Suurhall Arena, Tallinn
Attendance: 5,000
Referees: Lars Klaar (Sweden), Janusz Calik (Poland), Tomas Jasevicius (Lithuania)

6 September 2008
20:15

Game 4

Macedonia	85–48	Portugal
Scoring by quarter: 22–4, 22–20, 27–14, 14–10
Pts: V. Stefanov 23; Rebs: Gečevski 8 Asts: Samardžiski 4		Pts: Évora 15; Rebs: Santos 5 Asts: Costa 5

Boris Trajkovski Sports Arena, Skopje
Attendance: 6,000
Referees: Nikolaos Papadimitriou (Greece), Milivoje Jovčić (Serbia), Vladimir Tsekov (Bulgaria)

10 September 2008
18:30

Game 5

Latvia	79–43	Portugal
Scoring by quarter: 19–10, 19–15, 14–9, 27–9
Pts: Biedriņš 21; Rebs: Biedriņš 12; Asts: K. Valters 5		Pts: Andrade 15; Rebs: Andrade 8 Asts: Costa 6

Arena Riga, Riga
Attendance: 5,000
Referees: Borys Ryzhyk (Ukraine), Apostolos Kalpakas (Sweden), Sergey Krug (Russia)

10 September 2008
18:00

Game 6

Estonia	78–90	Macedonia
Scoring by quarter: 22–22, 15–24, 20–22, 21–22
Pts: Arbet 18; Rebs: Kangur 8 Asts: Tein 5		Pts: Massey 20; Rebs: Massey 10; Asts: V. Stefanov 4

Saku Suurhall Arena, Tallinn
Attendance: 4,000
Referees: Petri Mäntylä (Finland), Oscar Lefwerth (Sweden), Grzegorz Bachanski (Poland)

13 September 2008
20:15

Game 7

Macedonia	80–78	Latvia
Scoring by quarter: 28–17, 16–25, 20–19, 16–17
Pts: V. Stefanov 16; Rebs: Antiḱ 7 Asts: R. Stefanov, Samardžiski 2		Pts: Biedriņš 23; Rebs: Biedriņš 18; Asts: K. Valters 6

Boris Trajkovski Sports Arena, Skopje
Attendance: 6,000
Referees: Luigi Lamonica (Italy), Miroslav Tomov (Bulgaria), Spyridon Gontas (Greece)

13 September 2008
17:00

Game 8

Estonia	54–60	Portugal
Scoring by quarter: 12–18, 12–14, 6–20, 24–8
Pts: Dorbek, Kullamäe 12; Rebs: Talts 5 Asts: Kriisa 4		Pts: Cunha 21; Rebs: Miranda 9 Asts: Costa, Miranda 3

Saku Suurhall Arena, Tallinn
Attendance: 4,000
Referees: Carl Jungebrand (Finland), Anton Makhlin (Russia), Jurgis Laurinavicius (Lithuania)

17 September 2008
18:30

Game 9

Latvia	72–67	Estonia
Scoring by quarter: 20–10, 18–19, 17–15, 17–23
Pts: Biedriņš 16; Rebs: Biedriņš 8 Asts: Blūms, K. Valters 3		Pts: Kangur 21; Rebs: Kangur 14; Asts: Tein, Kangur 3

Arena Riga, Riga
Attendance: 4,500
Referees: Grzegorz Ziemblicki (Poland), Sergiy Chebyshev (Ukraine), Rafael Ganiev (Russia)

17 September 2008
21:00

Game 10

Portugal	81–71	Macedonia
Scoring by quarter: 22–10, 22–28, 14–16, 23–17
Pts: Costa 19; Rebs: Andrade 11; Asts: Costa 5		Pts: Massey 20; Rebs: Gečevski 6 Asts: Blaževski 3

Pavilhão Multiusos de Coimbra, Coimbra
Attendance: 2,000
Referees: Paolo Taurino (Italy), David Chambon (France), Antonio Conde (Spain)

20 September 2008
16:35

Game 11

Portugal	93–92	Latvia
Scoring by quarter: 23–18, 28–27, 19–22, 23–25
Pts: Costa 29; Rebs: Andrade 6 Asts: Costa 7		Pts: Janicenoks 21; Rebs: Biedriņš 13; Asts: K. Valters, Janicenoks 2

Pavilhão Rota dos Móveis, Parades
Attendance: 1,500
Referees: Fabrizio Pizio (Switzerland), Daniel Hierrezuelo (Spain), Eddie Viator (France)

20 September 2008
20:15

Game 12

Macedonia	87–75	Estonia
Scoring by quarter: 32–14, 19–13, 17–27, 19–21
Pts: Gečevski 18; Rebs: Gečevski 6 Asts: Ilievski 6		Pts: Kangur 19; Rebs: Kangur 7 Asts: Tein 7

Boris Trajkovski Sports Arena, Skopje
Attendance: 6,500
Referees: Christos Mastraftsis (Greece), Marin Mehandjiev (Bulgaria), Zoran Šutulović (Montenegro)

=== Group C ===
Qualified for the final Tournament
Qualified for the Additional Qualifying Round
Qualified for the Relegation Round

Team	Pts	W	L	PF	PA	Diff
Turkey	12	6	0	487	407	+80
France	9	3	3	460	446	+14
Belgium	8	2	4	403	430	−27
Ukraine	7	1	5	417	484	−67

Note: All times are local

3 September 2008
20:00

Game 1

Turkey	86–73	Ukraine
Scoring by quarter: 24–24, 27–13, 20–17, 15–19
Pts: Savaş, Gönlüm, Türkoğlu 15; Rebs: İlyasova 12; Asts: Türkoğlu 5		Pts: Butskyy, Agafonov 15; Rebs: Lishouk 8 Asts: Butskyy, Drozdov 3

Abdi İpekçi Arena, Istanbul
Attendance: 6,000
Referees: Moise Bitton (Israel), Dimitar Gologanov (Bulgaria), Milan Mažić (Serbia)

3 September 2008
20:00

Game 2

France	82–63	Belgium
Scoring by quarter: 16–15, 18–18, 21–12, 27–18
Pts: de Colo 28; Rebs: Marquis 6 Asts: Parker, Brun 3		Pts: Van Rossom 17; Rebs: Beghin 6 Asts: Moors 6

Palais des Sports Jean Weille, Nancy
Attendance: 6,000
Referees: Marcello Reatto (Italy), Oliver Krause (Germany), Neil Wilkinson (England)

6 September 2008
20:00

Game 3

Belgium	63–78	Turkey
Scoring by quarter: 13–15, 15–21, 21–18, 14–24
Pts: Beghin 19; Rebs: Beghin 10; Asts: Tabu-Eboma 3		Pts: İlyasova 21; Rebs: Gönlüm 13; Asts: Türkoğlu 5

Spiroudome, Charleroi
Attendance: 800
Referees: Carmelo Paternico (Italy), Roger Harrison (England), Robert Lottermoser (Germany)

6 September 2008
16:30

Game 4

Ukraine	78–77	France
Scoring by quarter: 19–25, 20–15, 15–20, 24–17
Pts: Lishouk 18; Rebs: Drozdov 6 Asts: Zabirchenko, Agafonov 4		Pts: Parker 30; Rebs: Brun, Turiaf 5 Asts: Parker, Tchicamboud, Brun, Turiaf 2

Palace of Sports, Kyiv
Attendance: 2,500
Referees: Romualdas Brazauskas (Lithuania), Marcin Kowalski (Poland), Sergey Mikhaylov (Russia)

10 September 2008
17:45

Game 5

Turkey	77–65	France
Scoring by quarter: 18–19, 20–16, 19–10, 20–20
Pts: Tunçeri 16; Rebs: İlyasova 8 Asts: Arslan, Türkoğlu 4		Pts: Parker 32; Rebs: Marquis 9 Asts: Diawara, Bokolo, de Colo, Kirksay 1

Abdi İpekçi Arena, Istanbul
Attendance: 10,300
Referees: Shmuel Bachar (Israel), Milija Vojinović (Serbia), Marius Ciulin (Romania)

10 September 2008
20:00

Game 6

Belgium	72–61	Ukraine
Scoring by quarter: 23–16, 14–14, 19–14, 16–17
Pts: Beghin 16; Rebs: Lichodzijewski 9 Asts: Van Rossom 5		Pts: Drozdov 27; Rebs: Agafonov 10; Asts: Drozdov, Agafonov 2

Spiroudome, Charleroi
Attendance: 500
Referees: Jose Martin (Spain), Luis Lopes (Portugal), Carmelo Lo Guzzo (Italy)

13 September 2008
16:30

Game 7

Ukraine	64–86	Turkey
Scoring by quarter: 16–17, 18–23, 16–27, 14–19
Pts: Kryvych 22; Rebs: Lishouk 8 Asts: Kryvych 4		Pts: Gönlüm 17; Rebs: İlyasova 7 Asts: Atsür, Savaş 3

Palace of Sports, Kyiv
Attendance: 3,500
Referees: Ilija Belošević (Serbia), Gennadi Ponomarev (Russia), Omer Esteron (Israel)

13 September 2008
20:00

Game 8

Belgium	65–71	France
Scoring by quarter: 11–16, 18–19, 20–16, 16–20
Pts: Lauwers 18; Rebs: Van der Jonckheyd, Lichodzijewski 7 Asts: Moors, Van der Jonckheyd 2		Pts: Parker 18; Rebs: de Colo 7 Asts: de Colo 2

Spiroudome, Charleroi
Attendance: 5,500
Referees: Guerrino Cerebuch (Italy), Oscar Perea (Spain), Bert Van Slooten (Netherlands)

17 September 2008
20:00

Game 9

Turkey	80–64	Belgium
Scoring by quarter: 18–15, 24–23, 21–10, 17–16
Pts: İlyasova 22; Rebs: İlyasova 8 Asts: Arslan, Türkoğlu 4		Pts: Moors 14; Rebs: Moors 6 Asts: Moors 5

Abdi İpekçi Arena, Istanbul
Attendance: 9,000
Referees: Luigi Lamonica (Italy), Andrej Jeršan (Slovenia), Seffi Shemmesh (Israel)

17 September 2008
20:00

Game 10

France	87–83	Ukraine
Scoring by quarter: 18–22, 25–19, 24–18, 20–24
Pts: Parker 25; Rebs: Turiaf 9 Asts: Kirksay 4		Pts: Agafonov 22; Rebs: Onufriyev 7 Asts: Butskyy 5

Antarès, Le Mans
Attendance: 6,000
Referees: Dubravko Muhvić (Croatia), Jose Ramon Garcia Ortiz (Spain), Eric Bertrand (Switzerland)

20 September 2008
20:00

Game 11

France	78–80	Turkey
Scoring by quarter: 20–15, 15–15, 21–22, 22–28
Pts: Parker 37; Rebs: Parker 7 Asts: Parker 5		Pts: Solak 16; Rebs: İlyasova, Gönlüm 7 Asts: Atsür, Tunçeri 3

Palais des Sports de Fetes, Limoges
Attendance: 6,000
Referees: Carmelo Paternico (Italy), Matej Boltauzer (Slovenia), Luis Lopes (Portugal)

20 September 2008
16:30

Game 12

Ukraine	58–76	Belgium
Scoring by quarter: 18–13, 11–25, 17–12, 12–26
Pts: Lishouk 21; Rebs: Drozdov 8 Asts: Kryvych 3		Pts: Beghin 18; Rebs: Beghin 11; Asts: Beghin, Hervelle, Van der Jonckheyd, Loubry 2

Olymp, Yuzhne
Attendance: 1,800
Referees: Milivoje Jovčić (Serbia), Gil Oved (Israel), Marek Maliszewski (Poland)

=== Group D ===
Qualified for the final Tournament
Qualified for the Additional Qualifying Round
Qualified for the Relegation Round

Team	Pts	W	L	PF	PA	Diff
Great Britain	10	4	2	504	482	+22
Israel	9	3	3	515	491	+24
Bosnia and Herzegovina	9	3	3	465	470	−5
Czech Republic	8	2	4	432	473	−41

Note: All times are local

3 September 2008
18:00

Game 1

Czech Republic	70–56	Bosnia and Herzegovina
Scoring by quarter: 16–14, 14–15, 20–11, 20–16
Pts: Benda 15; Rebs: Benda 10; Asts: Welsch 5		Pts: Teletović 12; Rebs: Đedović 6 Asts: Bajramović 3

ČEZ Arena, Pardubice
Attendance: 3,800
Referees: Grzegorz Bachanski (Poland), Boris Schmidt (Germany), Peter Bodnar (Hungary)

3 September 2008
19:00

Game 2

Israel	102–92 (OT)	Great Britain
Scoring by quarter: 19–25, 23–22, 27–20, 16–18, Overtime: 17–7
Pts: Tapiro 27; Rebs: Green 6 Asts: Tapiro 6		Pts: Deng 30; Rebs: Freeland 9 Asts: Mensah-Bonsu 6

Nokia Arena, Tel Aviv
Attendance: 7,000
Referees: Petr Sudek (Slovakia), Charalampos Karakatsounis (Greece), Ismail Özgün (Turkey)

6 September 2008
16:00

Game 3

Great Britain	87–68	Czech Republic
Scoring by quarter: 24–10, 13–13, 18–14, 32–31
Pts: Reinking 22; Rebs: Mensah-Bonsu 16; Asts: Boyd 6		Pts: Welsch 17; Rebs: Welsch 8 Asts: Welsch 4

The O2 arena, London
Attendance: 7,000
Referees: Vicente Bulto (Spain), Joseph Bissang (France), Sigmundur Herbertsson (Iceland)

6 September 2008
20:00

Game 4

Bosnia and Herzegovina	77–71	Israel
Scoring by quarter: 22–15, 19–18, 17–24, 19–14
Pts: Bajramović, Opačak 13; Rebs: Jazvin 9 Asts: Gordić 3		Pts: Tamir 13; Rebs: Green 7 Asts: Tapiro 3

SKPC Mejdan, Tuzla
Attendance: 5,000
Referees: Christos Christodoulou (Greece), Marko Juras (Serbia), Radomir Vojinović (Montenegro)

10 September 2008
18:00

Game 5

Czech Republic	91–70	Israel
Scoring by quarter: 18–12, 18–16, 27–19, 28–23
Pts: Welsch, Benda 20; Rebs: Starosta 9 Asts: Welsch 8		Pts: Pnini 22; Rebs: Casspi 8 Asts: Casspi, Halperin, Pnini 2

ČEZ Arena, Pardubice
Attendance: 4,670
Referees: Gianluca Mattioli (Italy), Fabien Conderanne (France), Anastasios Piloidis (Greece)

10 September 2008
19:30

Game 6

Great Britain	82–74	Bosnia and Herzegovina
Scoring by quarter: 20–18, 21–23, 21–11, 20–22
Pts: Deng 29; Rebs: Mensah-Bonsu 11; Asts: Deng 5		Pts: Bajramović 15; Rebs: Bajramović 8 Asts: Bremer 7

National Indoor Arena, Birmingham
Attendance: 2,525
Referees: Juan Mitjana (Spain), Carlos Mateus (France), Tomasz Trawicki (Poland)

13 September 2008
20:00

Game 7

Bosnia and Herzegovina	95–79	Czech Republic
Scoring by quarter: 28–29, 26–16, 13–15, 28–19
Pts: Teletović 20; Rebs: Jazvin 7 Asts: Gordić, Milošević, Bremer, Đedović 2		Pts: Welsch 20; Rebs: Benda 7 Asts: Nečas 2

Sport Hall SD Cazin, Cazin
Attendance: 2,500
Referees: Lazaros Voreadis (Greece), Enrico Sabetta (Italy), Tomislav Vovk (Croatia)

13 September 2008
19:00

Game 8

Great Britain	96–86	Israel
Scoring by quarter: 22–19, 31–21, 23–14, 20–32
Pts: Mensah-Bonsu 22; Rebs: Mensah-Bonsu 11; Asts: Deng, Reinking 5		Pts: Eliyahu 24; Rebs: Pnini 5 Asts: Tapiro 4

Liverpool Echo Arena, Liverpool
Attendance: 2,350
Referees: Daniel Hierrezuelo (Spain), Eddie Viator (France), Oliver Krause (Germany)

17 September 2008
18:00

Game 9

Czech Republic	63–67	Great Britain
Scoring by quarter: 20–21, 14–15, 13–17, 16–14
Pts: Welsch 28; Rebs: Welsch 6 Asts: Welsch 6		Pts: Deng 21; Rebs: Mensah-Bonsu 12; Asts: Boyd 2

ČEZ Arena, Pardubice
Attendance: 6,450
Referees: Saša Pukl (Slovenia), Roberto Chiari (Italy), Peter Vigh (Hungary)

17 September 2008
18:00

Game 10

Israel	88–74	Bosnia and Herzegovina
Scoring by quarter: 19–24, 21–21, 25–14, 23–15
Pts: Halperin 22; Rebs: Eliyahu 17; Asts: Eliyahu 6		Pts: Ikonić 17; Rebs: Opačak 7 Asts: Gordić 6

Nokia Arena, Tel Aviv
Attendance: 6,000
Referees: Fabio Facchini (Italy), Mehmet Keseratar (Turkey), Panagiotis Anastopoulos (Greece)

20 September 2008
21:00

Game 11

Israel	98–61	Czech Republic
Scoring by quarter: 28–17, 21–18, 29–19, 20–7
Pts: Halperin 25; Rebs: Eliyahu 9 Asts: Halperin 7		Pts: Benda 16; Rebs: Benda 5 Asts: Welsch 6

Nokia Arena, Tel Aviv
Attendance: 8,000
Referees: Christos Christodoulou (Greece), Emin Mogulkoc (Turkey), Antonis Demetriou (Cyprus)

20 September 2008
20:00

Game 12

Bosnia and Herzegovina	89–80	Great Britain
Scoring by quarter: 13–20, 28–17, 20–14, 28–29
Pts: Bremer 18; Rebs: Jazvin, Bajramović 5 Asts: Bremer 6		Pts: Betts 14; Rebs: Freeland, Betts 8 Asts: Sullivan 2

Sport Hall SD Cazin, Cazin
Attendance: 1,000
Referees: Ilija Belošević (Serbia), Siniša Herceg (Croatia), Georgios Tanatzis (Greece)

=== Best group runners-up ===
Teams were ranked by basis of winning percentage (PCT), then goal efficiency or goal average.

Qualified for the final Tournament
Qualified for the Additional Qualifying Round

Grp.	Team	W	L	PF	PA	Diff.	PCT	Tie GAvg.
B	Latvia	4	2	492	446	+46	.667	
D	Israel	3	3	515	491	+24	.500	1.0489
A	Bulgaria	4	4	670	639	+31	.500	1.0485
C	France	3	3	460	446	+14	.500	1.0313

== Additional qualifying round ==
The draw for the groups of the Additional Qualifying Round was held in Warsaw, Poland on 8 November 2008. Six teams have been divided in two groups of three teams each. The winners of these groups, Belgium and France, have played each other for the last place in EuroBasket 2009, with France earning the spot at the end. The Additional Qualifying Round has been held from 5 to 30 August 2009.

=== Draw seedings ===
Pot 1	Pot 2	Pot 3
France; Bosnia and Herzegovina	Italy; Portugal	Finland; Belgium

=== Group A ===
Qualified for the Additional qualifying round final match
Eliminated

Team	Pts	W	L	PF	PA	Diff	Tie
Belgium	7	3	1	303	277	+26	1–1, 1.112
Bosnia and Herzegovina	7	3	1	296	296	0	1–1, 0.899
Portugal	4	0	4	233	259	−26	

Note: All times are local

5 August 2009
20:30

Game 1

Portugal	56–62	Bosnia and Herzegovina
Scoring by quarter: 11–19, 11–17, 14–17, 20–9
Pts: Coelho 17; Rebs: Gomes 7 Asts: Miranda 4		Pts: Đedović 15; Rebs: Bajramović 6 Asts: Bajramović 2

Pavilhão Municipal da Póvoa de Varzim, Póvoa de Varzim
Attendance: 2,000
Referees: Daniel Hierrezuelo (Spain), Chantal Julien (France), Eric Bertrand (Switzerland)

8 August 2009
20:15

Game 2

Bosnia and Herzegovina	82–77	Belgium
Scoring by quarter: 19–26, 20–14, 26–16, 17–21
Pts: Đedović 18; Rebs: Bajramović 9 Asts: Gordić 3		Pts: Hervelle 33; Rebs: Hervelle 7 Asts: Hervelle, Moors, Mbenga, Van Rossom 2

Gradska arena, Zenica
Attendance: 4,000
Referees: Milivoje Jovčić (Serbia), Christos Christodoulou (Greece), Peter Bodnar (Hungary)

11 August 2009
20:00

Game 3

Belgium	64–58	Portugal
Scoring by quarter: 16–17, 10–15, 24–15, 14–11
Pts: Lauwers 16; Rebs: Hervelle 8 Asts: Lauwers 3		Pts: Santos 19; Rebs: Santos, Silva, Andrade 6 Asts: Silva, Andrade 3

Lotto Arena, Antwerp
Attendance: 2,000
Referees: Nicolas Maestre (France), Neil Wilkinson (England), Lahdo Sharro (Sweden)

14 August 2009
20:15

Game 4

Bosnia and Herzegovina	73–61	Portugal
Scoring by quarter: 21–22, 18–6, 18–15, 16–18
Pts: Gordić 18; Rebs: Bavčić 7 Asts: Bajramović, Bavčić, Jovanović 2		Pts: Costa, Évora 15; Rebs: Andrade 6 Asts: Santos 3

Gradska arena, Zenica
Attendance: 5,000
Referees: Ivo Dolinek (Czech Republic), Gili Cohen (Israel), Boris Gabara (Slovakia)

17 August 2009
20:00

Game 5

Belgium	102–79	Bosnia and Herzegovina
Scoring by quarter: 23–21, 23–26, 30–11, 26–21
Pts: Jonckheyd 20; Rebs: Hervelle 10; Asts: Bosco 4		Pts: Varda 17; Rebs: Bajramović 4 Asts: Gordić, Đedović, Jovanović 2

Lotto Arena, Antwerp
Attendance: 4,800
Referees: Carmelo Paternico (Italy), Carlos Mateus (France), Keith Williams (England)

20 August 2009
20:30

Game 6

Portugal	58–60	Belgium
Scoring by quarter: 9–16, 11–11, 19–16, 19–17
Pts: Andrade 16; Rebs: Andrade 7 Asts: Costa 3		Pts: Moors 15; Rebs: Hervelle 11; Asts: Moors 3

Pavilhão Multiusos de Coimbra, Coimbra
Attendance: 600
Referees: Miguel Perez Perez (Spain), Enrico Sabetta (Italy), Roger Harrison (England)

=== Group B ===
Qualified for the Additional qualifying round final match
Eliminated

Team	Pts	W	L	PF	PA	Diff
France	7	3	1	316	287	+29
Finland	6	2	2	319	321	−2
Italy	5	1	3	304	331	−27

Note: All times are local

5 August 2009
20:30

Game 1

Italy	77–80 (OT)	France
Scoring by quarter: 15–21, 14–14, 22–16, 15–15, Overtime: 11–14
Pts: Belinelli 26; Rebs: Mancinelli 5 Asts: Mancinelli 4		Pts: Piétrus, Batum 20; Rebs: Batum 8 Asts: Jeanneau, Diaw 4

PalaRockefeller, Cagliari
Attendance: 4,000
Referees: Zoran Šutulović (Montenegro), Matej Boltauzer (Slovenia), Robert Lottermoser (Germany)

8 August 2009
20:00

Game 2

France	82–72	Finland
Scoring by quarter: 28–21, 18–14, 17–12, 19–25
Pts: Diot 16; Rebs: Piétrus, Turiaf 6 Asts: de Colo 5		Pts: Haanpää 21; Rebs: Koponen, Kotti 5 Asts: Rannikko 5

Palais des Sports de Pau, Pau
Attendance: 7,500
Referees: Fernando Rocha (Portugal), Grzegorz Bachański (Poland), Moritz Reiter (Germany)

11 August 2009
19:00

Game 3

Finland	75–77	Italy
Scoring by quarter: 10–17, 24–21, 21–25, 20–14
Pts: Möttölä 16; Rebs: Möttölä, Kotti 4 Asts: Rannikko 6		Pts: Belinelli 23; Rebs: Bargnani 8 Asts: Vitali 5

Energia Areena, Vantaa
Attendance: 2,852
Referees: Jakub Zamojski (Poland), Apostolos Kalpakas (Sweden), Sergey Krug (Russia)

14 August 2009
20:00

Game 4

France	81–61	Italy
Scoring by quarter: 19–7, 22–20, 21–19, 19–15
Pts: Parker 23; Rebs: Piétrus 9 Asts: Parker 5		Pts: Belinelli 19; Rebs: Bargnani 5 Asts: Belinelli 2

Palais des Sports de Pau, Pau
Attendance: 8,000
Referees: Saša Pukl (Slovenia), Vicente Bulto (Spain), Robert Vyklicky (Czech Republic)

17 August 2009
19:00

Game 5

Finland	77–73	France
Scoring by quarter: 15–13, 18–23, 21–15, 23–22
Pts: Rannikko 21; Rebs: Möttölä 9 Asts: Koponen 4		Pts: de Colo 18; Rebs: Diaw 9 Asts: Diaw 4

Energia Areena, Vantaa
Attendance: 3,354
Referees: Romualdas Brazauskas (Lithuania), Oliver Krause (Germany), Ingus Baumanis (Latvia)

20 August 2009
20:30

Game 6

Italy	89–95	Finland
Scoring by quarter: 23–28, 25–23, 22–23, 19–21
Pts: Belinelli 26; Rebs: Amoroso 7 Asts: Giachetti 3		Pts: Koponen 26; Rebs: Nikkilä 6 Asts: Rannikko 5

PalaSavelli, Porto San Giorgio
Attendance: 2,650
Referees: Lazaros Voreadis (Greece), Zdravko Rutešić (Montenegro), Alfred Jovović (Croatia)

=== Additional qualifying round play-off ===
27 August 2009
20:00

Game 1

Belgium	70–66	France
Scoring by quarter: 19–27, 18–12, 18–17, 15–10
Pts: Hervelle 14; Rebs: Mbenga 7 Asts: Van Rossom 3		Pts: Parker 26; Rebs: Turiaf 12; Asts: Jeanneau, Parker, Piétrus, Turiaf, Diaw, Batum, Koffi, de Colo 1

Lotto Arena, Antwerp
Attendance: 5,600
Referees: Ilija Belošević (Serbia), Virginijus Dovidavicius (Lithuania), Panagiotis Anastopoulos (Greece)

30 August 2009
17:00

Game 2

France	92–54	Belgium
Scoring by quarter: 21–15, 27–10, 22–12, 22–17
Pts: Turiaf 19; Rebs: Turiaf 9 Asts: Diot 9		Pts: Beghin 11; Rebs: De Bel 4 Asts: Hervelle 3
Series tied 1–1, France win 158–124 on aggregate

Palais des Sports de Pau, Pau
Attendance: 8,000
Referees: Emilio Perez (Spain), Andrej Lovšin (Slovenia), Radomir Vojinović (Montenegro)

== Relegation round ==
The draw for the order of the games of the Relegation Round was held in Warsaw, Poland on 8 November 2008. Four teams have played home and away matches in a round-robin tournament. At the end, the two teams topping the group, Hungary and Ukraine, have stayed in Division A and the two teams at the bottom, Czech Republic and Estonia, have been relegated to EuroBasket Division B championship. The Relegation Round was held from 5 to 20 August 2009.

=== Group C ===
Stays in EuroBasket Division A
Relegated to EuroBasket Division B

Team	Pts	W	L	PF	PA	Diff	Tie
Hungary	10	4	2	435	394	+41	1–1, 1.104
Ukraine	10	4	2	436	437	−1	1–1, 0.906
Czech Republic	9	3	3	412	404	+8	
Estonia	7	1	5	383	431	−48	

Note: All times are local

5 August 2009
18:00

Game 1

Hungary	91–67	Ukraine
Scoring by quarter: 18–16, 22–21, 29–18, 22–12
Pts: Németh 21; Rebs: Lóránt 12; Asts: Fodor, Németh, Trepák, Lóránt 2		Pts: Pecherov 17; Rebs: Fesenko 7 Asts: Popov, Gliebov 2

Arena Savaria, Szombathely
Attendance: 2,000
Referees: Srđan Dožai (Croatia), Milan Mažić (Serbia), Aleksandar Milojeviḱ (Republic of Macedonia)

5 August 2009
19:00

Game 2

Estonia	69–65	Czech Republic
Scoring by quarter: 12–20, 16–19, 14–12, 27–14
Pts: Arbet 17; Rebs: Kangur, Talts 8 Asts: Kangur, Talts 3		Pts: Benda 16; Rebs: Veselý 9 Asts: Slezak 3

Saku Suurhall Arena, Tallinn
Attendance: 5,342
Referees: Marek Ćmikiewicz (Poland), Olegs Latisevs (Latvia), Sergey Mikhaylov (Russia)

8 August 2009
20:30

Game 3

Czech Republic	71–65	Hungary
Scoring by quarter: 19–11, 16–25, 22–13, 14–16
Pts: Benda 13; Rebs: Benda, Satoranský 9 Asts: Marek 3		Pts: Németh 15; Rebs: Z. Horváth 9 Asts: Németh, Fodor 2

Sportovní hala Folimanka, Prague
Attendance: 1,000
Referees: Guerrino Cerebuch (Italy), Dragan Nešković (Serbia), Dariusz Lenczowski (Poland)

8 August 2009
18:00

Game 4

Ukraine	71–64	Estonia
Scoring by quarter: 24–21, 12–14, 16–12, 19–17
Pts: Agafonov 17; Rebs: Gliebov 8 Asts: Vilkhovetskyi 3		Pts: Arbet 19; Rebs: Talts 13; Asts: Tein 4

Meridian Sports Complex, Kyiv
Attendance: 800
Referees: Luigi Lamonica (Italy), Mehmet Keseratar (Turkey), Florin Grigoras (Romania)

11 August 2009
18:00

Game 5

Hungary	75–64	Estonia
Scoring by quarter: 18–16, 18–16, 16–23, 23–9
Pts: Lóránt 18; Rebs: Lóránt 7 Asts: Hanga 4		Pts: Tein 17; Rebs: Tein 9 Asts: Arbet, Sokk 4

Tiszaligeti Sports Hall, Szolnok
Attendance: 3,000
Referees: Dubravko Muhvić (Croatia), Marko Juras (Serbia), Alexandru Olaru (Romania)

11 August 2009
20:00

Game 6

Czech Republic	71–64	Ukraine
Scoring by quarter: 24–12, 16–22, 15–16, 16–14
Pts: Benda 20; Rebs: Benda, Veselý 6 Asts: Satoranský 6		Pts: Kolchenko 22; Rebs: Agafonov, Korniyenko 6 Asts: Saltovets, Popov 2

Sportovní hala Folimanka, Prague
Attendance: 1,350
Referees: Grzegorz Ziemblicki (Poland), Regis Bardera (France), Benjamin Barth (Germany)

14 August 2009
18:00

Game 7

Ukraine	77–69	Hungary
Scoring by quarter: 19–20, 8–19, 25–14, 25–16
Pts: Pecherov 28; Rebs: Pecherov 17; Asts: Gladyr 3		Pts: Németh 22; Rebs: Lóránt 8 Asts: Fodor 5

Meridian Sports Complex, Kyiv
Attendance: 1,000
Referees: Shmuel Bachar (Israel), Engin Kennerman (Turkey), Anton Makhlin (Russia)

14 August 2009
18:00

Game 8

Czech Republic	80–54	Estonia
Scoring by quarter: 22–17, 19–10, 19–14, 20–13
Pts: Sokolovský, Benda 20; Rebs: Jelinek 5 Asts: Satoranský 5		Pts: Talts, Arbet 10; Rebs: Talts 6 Asts: Tein, Kangur 2

Sportovní hala Folimanka, Prague
Attendance: 1,400
Referees: Milija Vojinović (Serbia), Marin Mehandjiev (Bulgaria), Roman Kolar (Slovenia)

17 August 2009
18:00

Game 9

Hungary	70–55	Czech Republic
Scoring by quarter: 16–9, 21–11, 25–17, 8–18
Pts: A. Horváth 21; Rebs: Lóránt 8 Asts: Fodor, Kaman 3		Pts: Benda 14; Rebs: Satoranský 7 Asts: Marek 4

Tiszaligeti Sports Hall, Szolnok
Attendance: 2,500
Referees: Petar Obradović (Bosnia and Herzegovina), Aleksandar Glišić (Serbia), Doru Vinasi (Romania)

17 August 2009
19:00

Game 10

Estonia	72–75 (OT)	Ukraine
Scoring by quarter: 20–22, 15–15, 17–15, 15–15, Overtime: 5–8
Pts: Kangur 19; Rebs: Kangur 17; Asts: Kangur, Arbet, Sokk 3		Pts: Pecherov 29; Rebs: Pecherov 17; Asts: Agafonov, Lukashov 2

Saku Suurhall Arena, Tallinn
Attendance: 3,500
Referees: Sergey Bulanov (Russia), Fedor Dmitriev (Belarus), Arnis Ozols (Latvia)

20 August 2009
17:00

Game 11

Estonia	60–65	Hungary
Scoring by quarter: 7–14, 18–15, 19–16, 16–20
Pts: Kangur 18; Rebs: Talts 6 Asts: Sokk 4		Pts: Németh 18; Rebs: Lóránt 12; Asts: Fodor, Németh, Z. Horváth 2

Saku Suurhall Arena, Tallinn
Attendance: 1,111
Referees: Oscar Lefwerth (Sweden), Marcin Kowalski (Poland), Mindaugas Vecerskis (Lithuania)

20 August 2009
18:00

Game 12

Ukraine	82–70	Czech Republic
Scoring by quarter: 14–11, 22–19, 20–26, 26–14
Pts: Pecherov 21; Rebs: Pecherov 10; Asts: Lukashov, Vilkhovetskyi, Gladyr 3		Pts: Jelinek 17; Rebs: Sokolovsky 7 Asts: Licartovsky, Pumprla 2

Meridian Sports Complex, Kyiv
Attendance: 1,200
Referees: Rüstü Nuran (Turkey), Chrisostomos Schinas (Greece), Omer Esteron (Israel)

== See also ==
- Eurobasket 2009 Division B – Montenegro and Georgia have been promoted from the EuroBasket Division B to qualify in Division A, thus replacing Czech Republic and Estonia in the qualifications for the EuroBasket 2011.
