= Klaudio Ndoja =

Albanian-Italian coach and former basketball player

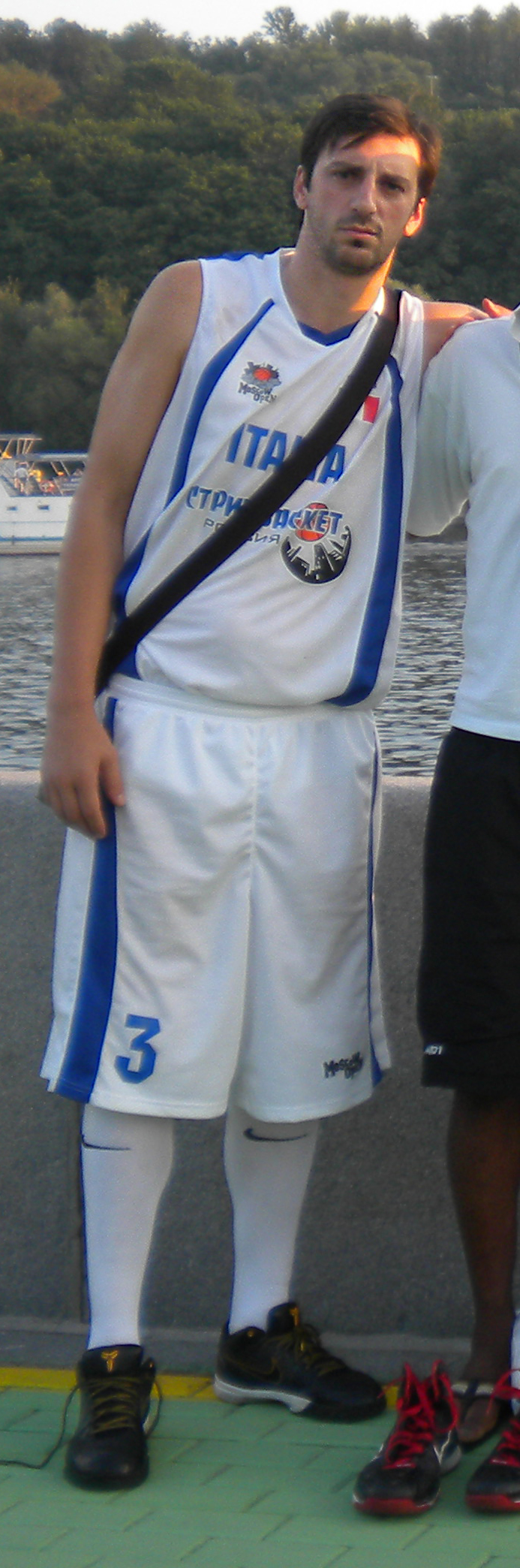

Personal information
- Born: May 18, 1985 (age 41) Shkodër, Albania
- Listed height: 6 ft 7 in (2.01 m)
- Listed weight: 225 lb (102 kg)

Career information
- Playing career: 2002–2023
- Position: Forward

Career history

Playing
- 2002–2003: Aurora Desio
- 2003–2005: Assigeco Casalpusterlengo
- 2005–2006: Pallacanestro Sant'Antimo
- 2006–2007: Borgomanero
- 2007–2008: Betaland Capo d'Orlando
- 2008–2009: Givova Scafati
- 2009–2010: Aurora Jesi
- 2010–2011: BC Ferrara
- 2011–2013: Enel Brindisi
- 2013–2014: Vanoli Cremona
- 2014–2015: Scaligera Verona
- 2015–2015: Dinamica Mantova
- 2016–2019: Virtus Bologna
- 2019–2020: Pallacanestro Forlì 2.015
- 2020–2022: Real Sebastiani Rieti
- 2023: JuveCaserta

Coaching
- 2024–present: Albania (women)

Career highlights
- Italian Second League champion (2017)

Klaudio Ndoja (born May 18, 1985) is a retired Albanian-Italian professional basketball player. He last played for JuveCaserta. He was a member of the Albania national team in 2012 for the EuroBasket 2013 qualifiers. He is currently the coach of the Albania women's national basketball team.

== Achievements ==
Enel Brindisi

- Italian Legadue Cup (1): 2011–12
- Promotion to Serie A (1): 2011–12
