= István Németh =

Hungarian basketball player

Personal information
- Born: 16 November 1979 (age 46) Körmend, Hungary
- Listed height: 1.92 m (6 ft 4 in)
- Listed weight: 85 kg (187 lb)

Career information
- NBA draft: 2001: undrafted
- Playing career: 1997–2013
- Position: Shooting guard
- Number: 4, 15, 17

Career history
- 1997–2002: Marc-Körmend
- 2002–2003: Benetton Treviso
- 2003: Marc-Körmend
- 2003–2004: NIS Vojvodina
- 2004–2006: Prokom Trefl Sopot
- 2006–2008: Vojvodina Srbijagas
- 2008–2009: AEK Athens
- 2009: ViveMenorca
- 2009: Carife Ferrara
- 2010–2012: MJUS-Fortress Körmend
- 2012–2013: Szolnoki Olaj

István Németh (born 16 November 1979) is a Hungarian former professional basketball player. He currently works as a studio analyst on Hungarian sports channel Sport TV.

== Hungarian national team ==
Németh was a member of the Hungarian national team at the EuroBasket 1999.

== See also ==
- List of foreign basketball players in Serbia
