= Flinder Boyd =

British basketball player

Personal information
- Born: 12 February 1980 (age 46) San Francisco, California
- Listed height: 1.80 m (5 ft 11 in)
- Listed weight: 79 kg (174 lb)

Career information
- High school: Fairfax (Los Angeles, California)
- College: Dartmouth (1998–2002)
- NBA draft: 2002: undrafted
- Playing career: 2002–2012
- Position: Point guard

Career history
- 2002–2003: STB Le Havre
- 2003–2004: ALM Évreux Basket
- 2004–2005: FC Mulhouse Basket
- 2005–2006: Hermine de Nantes Atlantique
- 2006–2008: CI Rosalía de Castro
- 2009: Leicester Riders
- 2010: Newcastle Eagles
- 2010: Club Ourense Baloncesto
- 2010–2011: BC Prievidza
- 2011: AEK Athens
- 2011–2012: Leicester Riders

Flinder Boyd (born 12 February 1980) is a retired British basketball player born in California to British parents.

== College career ==
Boyd played college basketball at Dartmouth College scoring 1026 points and recording 585 assists over his four-year career. He holds both the Dartmouth single game (16) and career assist records.

== Professional career ==
Boyd started his professional career in France in the Ligue Nationale de Basket where he played for STB Le Havre, ALM Évreux Basket, FC Mulhouse Basket and Hermine de Nantes Atlantique. He would then move to CI Rosalía de Castro of Spain for a two-year spell before moving to Britain to play for British Basketball League teams Leicester Riders and the Newcastle Eagles. In 2010 Boyd returned to Spain to play for Ourense. During the 2010–11 season he played with BC Prievidza in Slovakia and AEK Athens BC of Greece.

== International ==
Boyd has made 34 appearances for the Great Britain national basketball team and competed in the 2009 Eurobasket championship in Poland.
