= Edgars Jeromanovs =

Latvian basketball player

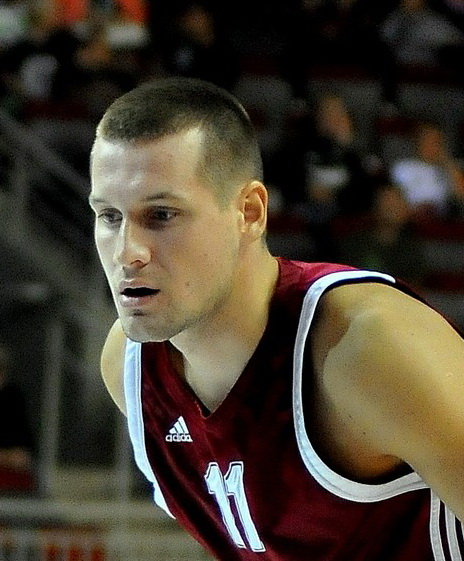
- Jeromanovs in 2011

No. 9 – Jūrmala
- Position: Point guard
- League: Latvian Basketball League

Personal information
- Born: April 18, 1986 (age 40) Saldus, Latvian SSR, Soviet Union
- Listed height: 1.88 m (6 ft 2 in)

Career information
- Playing career: 2002–present

Career history
- 2002–2005: Ventspils Augstskola
- 2005–2007: Barons
- 2007–2009: VEF Rīga
- 2009–2010: Mykolaiv
- 2010–2011: Perikos/Arhelaos
- 2011–2014: Norrköping Dolphins
- 2014–present: Jūrmala

Career highlights
- Estonia/Latvia League All Star (2018)

Edgars Jeromanovs (born April 18, 1986) is a professional Latvian basketball player who plays the point guard position. He is currently playing for BK Jūrmala of the Latvian Basketball League.

He has represented the Latvian national team in EuroBasket 2011.

He was an international exchange student during the 2001–2002 school year. He attended Ballinger High School in Ballinger, Texas. He was on the Bearcat varsity basketball team and helped lead them to the playoffs. He was also named the district newcomer of the year.
