= Valerio Amoroso =

Italian basketball player (born 1980)

Juvecaserta Basket
- Position: Power forward / center
- League: Lega Basket Serie A

Personal information
- Born: 26 September 1980 (age 46) Cercola, Italy
- Listed height: 6 ft 8 in (2.03 m)
- Listed weight: 236 lb (107 kg)

Career information
- Playing career: 1996–present

Career history
- 1996–1998: Pallacanestro Battipaglia
- 1998–2002: Roseto
- 2002–2003: Scafati
- 2003–2004: →Virtus 1934
- 2004–2005: Scafati
- 2005–2008: Sutor Montegranaro
- 2008–2010: Teramo
- 2010–2011: →Virtus Bologna
- 2011–2012: Teramo
- 2012: Pesaro
- 2012–2013: Sutor Montegranaro
- 2013–2014: Torino
- 2014–2015: Giorgio Tesi Group Pistoia
- 2015: Pallacanestro Varese
- 2015–present: Juvecaserta Basket

Valerio Amoroso (born 26 September 1980) is an Italian professional basketball player who plays as power forward or center.
