= Zaur Pashayev (basketball) =

Azerbaijani basketball player

No. 4 – BC Kutaisi 2010
- Position: Point guard
- League: Georgian Superliga

Personal information
- Born: August 31, 1983 (age 43) Jalilabad, Azerbaijan
- Listed height: 6 ft 2 in (1.88 m)
- Listed weight: 161 lb (73 kg)

Career information
- Playing career: 2000–present

Career history
- 2003–2004: NTD-Devon
- 2004–2008: Gala Baku
- 2008–2009: NTD-Tbilisi
- 2009–2010: Araz-NTD
- 2011–present: Kutaisi 2010
Medals
Men's basketball
Representing Azerbaijan
Islamic Solidarity Games
Gold medal – first place	2005 Medina	Team
Gold medal – first place	2017 Baku	3x3 basketball
Silver medal – second place	2021 Konya	3x3 basketball

Zaur Pashayev (Azerbaijani: Zaur Paşayev; born August 31, 1983 in Jalilabad, Azerbaijan), is an Azerbaijani professional basketball player.

== Career ==
He plays for Kutaisi 2010 of the Georgian Superliga. He plays the point guard position. He is 1.88 m tall. He is member of Azerbaijan national basketball team since 2000.

== Awards and accomplishments ==
- Georgian Super League
  - Winner (1): (2016)
  - Runners-up (1): (2014)
