= Robin Smeulders =

Dutch basketball player (born 1987)

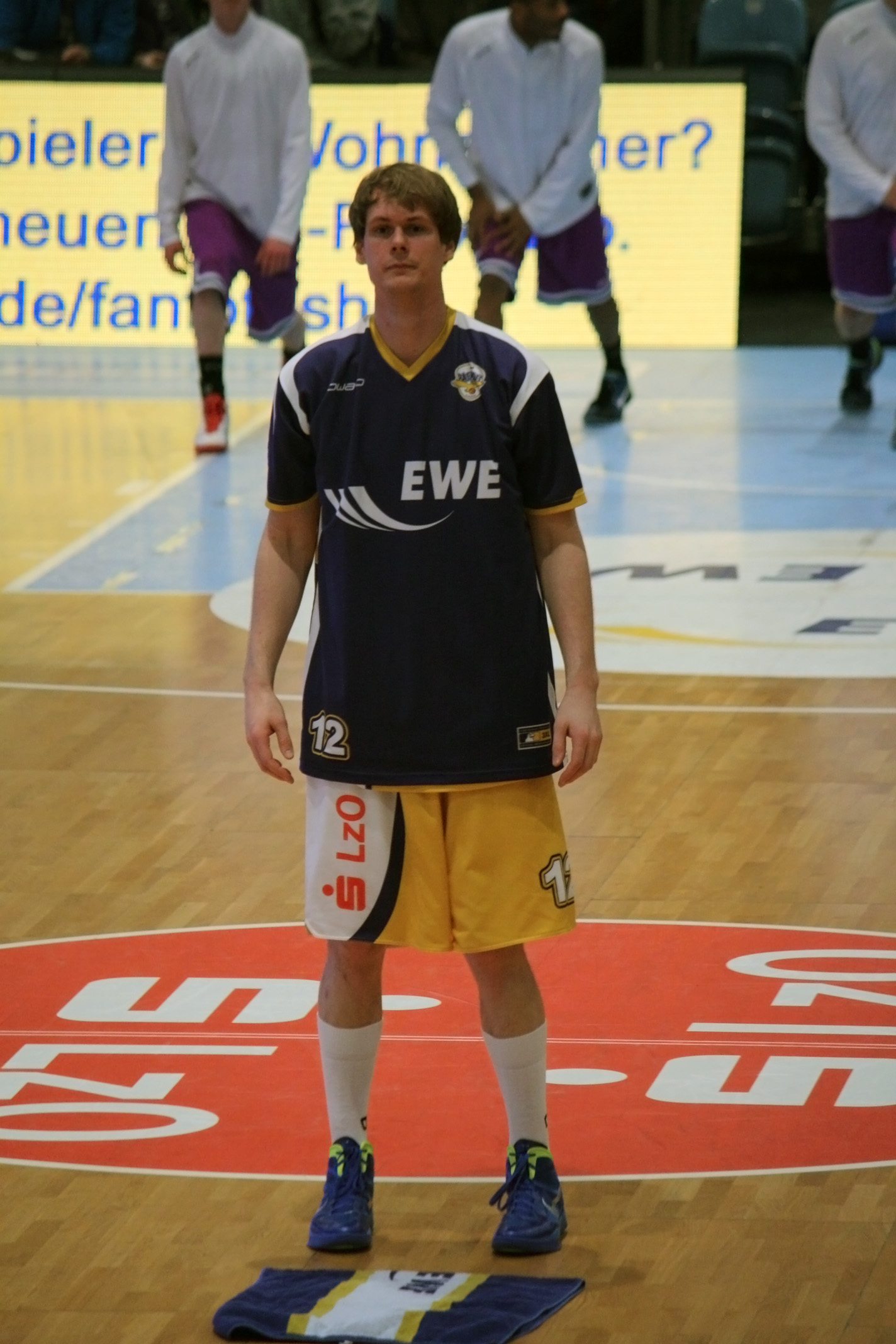

Personal information
- Born: 19 June 1987 (age 39) Münster, Germany
- Listed height: 6 ft 10 in (2.08 m)
- Listed weight: 233 lb (106 kg)

Career information
- College: Portland (2007–2010)
- Playing career: 2010–2016
- Position: Power forward
- Number: 13

Career history
- 2004–2006: SG Braunschweig
- 2010–2016: EWE Baskets Oldenburg

Career highlights
- German Cup champion (2015); First-team All-WCC (2010)

Robin Smeulders (born 19 June 1987) is a Dutch retired professional basketball player who played nine seasons in the Basketball Bundesliga. He was also a regular member of the Netherlands national team. Smeulders also owns the German and Austrian nationality.

Smeulders played the majority of his career with Baskets Oldenburg, and won the BBL-Pokal in 2015.

== Personal life ==
Smeulders is the son of an Austrian mother and Dutch father. He grew up in both Germany and the Netherlands before spending a year abroad from 2003 to 2004 at Ka’ahumanu Hou High School in Maui, Hawai’i, and four years of college at the University of Portland in Portland, Oregon.

== Pre-college career ==
As a youth, Smeulders played for EBBC Hertogenbosch, Vellmar.

Smeulders has also played club basketball for SG Braunschweig in the 2. Bundesliga (German Second Division) for two seasons from 2004 to 2006 under head coach Liviu Calin. Smeulders was the third youngest member of Braunschweig during the 2005-06 season, yet played nearly 19 minutes per game and averaged 5.8 points and 4.1 rebounds. He posted season-highs of 19 points, eight rebounds, and four blocks for Braunschweig. For the season, Smeulders shot 49 percent from the field, 40 percent from three-point range and 71 percent from the foul line.

== College career ==
Smeulders played NCAA college basketball at University of Portland under head coach Eric Reveno. As a freshman, Smeulders was ruled ineligible to play in any game due to his history of playing for a German club team, which the NCAA deemed as professional.

Smeulders was a three-year starter at power forward for the Pilots and averaged 12.3 points and 6.3 rebounds per game, with a career high of 29 points against St. Mary's College in 2010 and 16 rebounds against Santa Clara University in 2008, during his three-year career. He recorded his 1,000th career point in the final regular season game against Lewis & Clark College, being only the 13th to do so in three or less years. Smeulders finished in the top 15 of the West Coast Conference in scoring, rebounding and field goal percentage (.507). He tied for 20th in Portland career scoring with 1,036 points, 13th in school history in total rebounds with 582, and tied for 11th in Pilots history with 47 blocked shots. While with the Pilots, Smeulders helped lead the team to a 10-4 record—the best in school history—in the West Coast Conference, a school record of 21 wins, the team's first two postseason appearances since 1996, and a seat in the AP Top 25 for the first time in 50 years on 30 November 2009 at # 25.

== College honors ==
Smeulders received multiple honors for high performance in both academics and basketball. He earned an All-West Coast Conference First Team honor and was named to the WCC All-Academic Team for three consecutive seasons. In addition, he was selected as part of the National Association of Basketball Coaches (NABC) All-District 9 Second Team.

Smeulders was also named to the Division I-AAA Athletics Directors Association Men's Basketball Scholar-Athlete Team for two consecutive seasons. To be named to this team, student athletes were:

“required to have a minimum grade point average of 3.20 (on a 4.00 scale) in undergraduate study and have been a starter or important reserve with legitimate athletics credentials for a Division I-AAA ADA member institution. He/she must have reached junior athletics and academic standing at the nominated institution (true freshmen, red-shirt freshmen and ineligible athletics transfers are not eligible) and have completed at least three academic semesters/five quarters at the nominated institution. Nominated student-athletes must have participated in at least 50 percent of the team's games listed on the nomination form.”

Smeulders additionally earned his way to the National Association of Basketball Coaches (NABC) Honor Court, for which he must have met the criteria of being a junior or senior varsity player, holding a cumulative GPA of 3.2 or higher at the end of the academic year, being at the school for over a year, and being a member of the NCAA or NAIA institution.

== Professional career ==
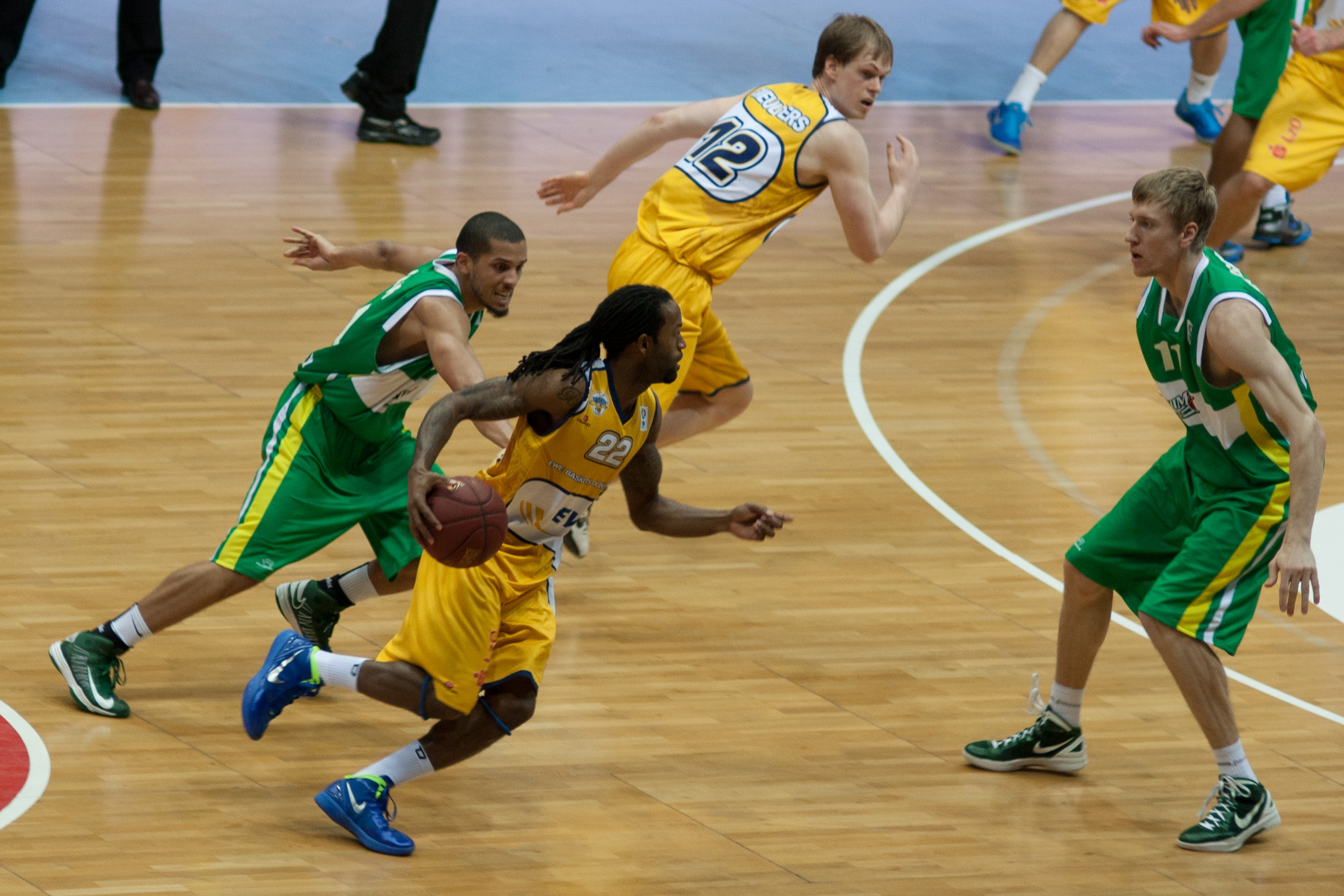
Smeulders (center) with Oldenburg, playing against BC Khimik in 2013

On 8 June 2010 Smeulders signed for two years plus an option of a third year, to the Basketball Bundesliga’s EWE Baskets Oldenburg. On 24 May 2012 it was announced that Smeulders would stay through the 2013 season for the optional third year. In 2013 the EWE Baskets Oldenburg extended the contract with the player for two more years. On 11 June 2015 it was announced that Oldenburg had signed another two-year deal with Smeulders.

In June 2016, Smeulders retired due to back problems.

== International career ==
In 2010, Smeulders began competing as part of the Senior Dutch National Team after previously playing for the junior teams three times. He has continued to represent the men's team annually, excluding 2014. In 2005, Smeulders was selected for the Under-18 Dutch National Team and played at the 2005 European Championships in Ruzomberok, Slovakia. Smeulders was a member of the Under-20 Dutch National Team in both 2006 and 2007 and participated in the European Championships in Lisbon, Portugal, and Warsaw, Poland, respectively.

== Trivia ==
Smeulders studied marketing and management and, in May 2010, received his Bachelor of Business Administration degree. He stands at 6’10” and weighs 233 pounds. Smeulders has earned the nicknames “The Dunking Dutchman” and “The Flying Dutchman.”
