= Kenny Grant =

American basketball player

Kenneth Grant is an American-Swedish former professional basketball player and coach.

== Career ==
A native of New York, Grant attended Saint Peter's College. From 1965 to 1968, he saw action in a total of 75 games for the Peacocks. A 6'1 forward, Grant helped Saint Peter's men's basketball team advance to the National Invitational Tournament semifinals in 1968. The 1967–68 Peacock team was inducted into the Saint Peter's University Athletics Hall of Fame in 2016. As an individual, Grant was inducted in 2001.

After college, he worked as a teacher, before joining a basketball tour team compiled by Jim McGregor. Grant went to Sweden in 1972 to play professional basketball. He was a member of the Hageby BK team in Norrköping between 1972 and 1983. In 1980, he won the Swedish national championship with the club and subsequently competed in the FIBA Champions' Cup.

Grant received Swedish citizenship and participated in the 1983 European Championships. The same year, he accepted an offer from France, joining Le Mans Sarthe Basket. He played for the Le Mans side in 1983–84 and later became the team's coach. Other coaching stints in France include Stade Français and Élan Béarnais Pau-Orthez. He also held coach's clinics in African countries.

Grant got into agent business, in the early 2000s, he and his family moved to Lido Beach, New York. Grant and his wife, whom he met in Sweden, have three children. Son Kenny Grant Junior attended Davidson College before embarking on a career in professional basketball.
