= João Santos (basketball) =

Portuguese basketball player

Personal information
- Born: June 15, 1979 (age 47) Lisbon, Portugal
- Listed height: 6 ft 8.7 in (2.05 m)
- Listed weight: 214 lb (97 kg)

Career information
- College: Nevada (1998–2001)
- Playing career: 1996–present
- Position: Small forward / power forward

Career history
- 1996–1998: Portugal Telecom
- 2001–2002: Panionios BC
- 2002–2004: C.A. Queluz
- 2004–2008: CB Valladolid
- 2008–2010: Benfica
- 2010–2012: FC Porto

João Pedro Gomes Santos (born June 15, 1979 in Lisbon) is a Portuguese basketball player, currently playing for Portuguese side FC Porto. He measures 2.03 metres and plays as a power forward. He played in Eurobasket 2007 by the Portugal national team and averanged 11.2 ppg, 4.7 rpg and 0.8 apg.

== ACB career statistics ==
Legend
GP	Games played	GS	Games started	MPG	Minutes per game
FG%	Field goal percentage	3P%	3-point field goal percentage	FT%	Free throw percentage
RPG	Rebounds per game	APG	Assists per game	SPG	Steals per game
BPG	Blocks per game	PPG	Points per game	**Bold**	Career high

Year	Team	GP	GS	MPG	FG%	3P%	FT%	RPG	APG	SPG	BPG	PPG
2007–08	Grupo Capitol Valladolid	**34**	**22**	16.7	.415	.386	.843	1.6	.3	**.6**	**.2**	5.3
2006–07	Grupo Capitol Valladolid	33	13	**17.6**	.387	.345	.850	**2.6**	**.4**	.4	**.2**	**6.3**
2005–06	Forum Valladolid	**34**	10	17.0	.405	.396	**.862**	2.4	**.4**	.5	.1	5.8
2004–05	Forum Valladolid	27	1	7.4	**.449**	**.406**	.667	0.7	.1	.07	.1	2.3
Career		128	46	15.1	.406	.377	.836	1.9	.3	.4	.1	5.1
