= FIBA EuroBasket 2007 qualification =

Qualification for the 2007 FIBA European Championship, commonly called FIBA EuroBasket 2007 took place between 31 August 2006 and 16 September 2007. A total of seven teams qualified for the tournament. Hosts Spain plus the eight European teams that participated in the 2006 FIBA World Championship (France, Germany, Greece, Italy, Lithuania, Serbia, Slovenia and Turkey) qualified directly.

== Format ==
National squads were divided in a two-tier system. Teams in Division A competed for direct qualification to FIBA EuroBasket 2007, while teams in Division B competed for two spots on the next tournament's Division A. Those two spots would correspond to the two teams from Division A that were relegated.

Division A

- Teams were split into four groups of four teams each. The competition system was that of a double round-robin with home and away games where the winner from each group and the two best runners-up qualified to EuroBasket 2007.
- The remaining teams where split into three double round-robin groups, two of three teams and one of four teams, and competed in an additional qualifying round. The winners from each group formed an additional round-robin group where the best team earned the last berth for EuroBasket 2007. The three bottom teams from the additional qualifying round competed in another round-robin group where the bottom-two teams were relegated to Division B for the following tournament.

Division B

- Teams were split into two groups of four teams each, and one group of three teams. The competition system was that of a double round-robin with home and away games where the winner from each group plus the best runner-up where paired in two series of home-and-away games. The winner of each series (by overall point differential if the two-game series is a split) is promoted to Division A for the next tournament.

== Division A ==
=== Qualifying round ===
Qualified for FIBA EuroBasket 2007

==== Group 1 ====
Team	Pld	W	L	PF	PA	PD	Pts	Tie
Poland	6	4	2	457	447	+10	10	
Sweden	6	3	3	453	438	+15	9	1–1, +5
Ukraine	6	3	3	444	431	+13	9	1–1, -5
Bulgaria	6	2	4	440	478	−38	8	

Rules=1) Points; 2) Head-to-head results; 3) Points difference; 4) Points scored.

31 Aug 2006
17:45

Boxscore

Bulgaria	80–77	Ukraine
Scoring by quarter: 23–20, 25–22, 19–19, 13–16
Pts: Stoykov 27; Rebs: Videnov 8 Asts: H. Dimitrov, Stoykov 3		Pts: Drozdov 16; Rebs: Pecherov 11; Asts: Lishchuk 4

Palace of Culture and Sports, Varna
Referees: Mehmet Keseratar (TUR), Branislav Mrdak (SRB), Aleksandar Milojevic (MKD)

31 Aug 2006
19:00

Boxscore

Sweden	75–81	Poland
Scoring by quarter: 16–23, 15–14, 21–20, 23–24
Pts: Ringström 19; Rebs: Nnamaka, Jönzén 6 Asts: Levin 4		Pts: Dylewicz, Wójcik 18; Rebs: Dylewicz 7 Asts: Skibniewski 7

Arena of Magic M7, Borås

3 Sep 2006
18:30

Boxscore

Poland	75–68	Bulgaria
Scoring by quarter: 15–12, 26–14, 19–20, 15–22
Pts: Pluta 21; Rebs: Dylewicz, Hyzy 6 Asts: Koszarek 6		Pts: Stoykov 25; Rebs: Stoykov 6 Asts: Radionov, Stoykov 3

Hala OSIR, Włocławek
Attendance: 2,500
Referees: Murat Biricik (TUR)

3 Sep 2006
19:00

Boxscore

Ukraine	66–61	Sweden
Scoring by quarter: 13–11, 24–22, 10–12, 19–16
Pts: Drozdov 16; Rebs: Lishchuk 12; Asts: Butskyy 6		Pts: Jönzén 16; Rebs: Jönzén 6 Asts: Levin 4

Arena of BC Kyiv, Kyiv
Attendance: 1,000
Referees: Shay Shtriks (BUL), Sergey Mikhaylov (RUS)

5 Sep 2006
17:45

Boxscore

Bulgaria	82–90	Sweden
Scoring by quarter: 20–30, 23–16, 15–20, 24–24
Pts: Videnov 29; Rebs: Banev 7 Asts: Bozov 3		Pts: Lindquist 24; Rebs: Lindquist 9 Asts: Levin, Ilunga 2

Palace of Culture and Sports, Varna
Attendance: 2,000
Referees: Seffi Shemmesh (ISR), Rüstü Nuran (TUR)

6 Sep 2006
18:30

Boxscore

Poland	74–58	Ukraine
Scoring by quarter: 26–18, 17–17, 20–9, 11–14
Pts: Wójcik 24; Rebs: Dylewicz 8 Asts: Koszarek 6		Pts: Gurtovyy 18; Rebs: Drozdov, Lishchuk 6 Asts: Butskyy 3

Andrzej Grubba City Sportshall, Starogard Gdański
Attendance: 2,800
Referees: Robert Vyklicky (CZE)

9 Sep 2006
18:30

Boxscore

Poland	88–67	Sweden
Scoring by quarter: 24–21, 20–14, 22–18, 22–14
Pts: Wójcik 20; Rebs: Wójcik 10; Asts: Wójcik 6		Pts: Nnamaka 18; Rebs: Nnamaka 8 Asts: Mbemba 4

Luczniczka Sports Arena, Bydgoszcz
Attendance: 3,000
Referees: Aare Halliko (EST), Arnis Ozols (LAT), Sreten Radovic (CRO)

9 Sep 2006
19:00

Boxscore

Ukraine	92–61	Bulgaria
Scoring by quarter: 26–15, 16–8, 33–21, 17–17
Pts: Podorvannyy 19; Rebs: Drozdov 11; Asts: Skutyelnik 8		Pts: Videnov 16; Rebs: K. Ivanov, Banev, Slaveykov, Georgiev 3 Asts: Videnov, Stoykov 2

Arena of BC Kyiv, Kyiv
Attendance: 1,500
Referees: Omer Esteron (ISR)

13 Sep 2006
17:45

Boxscore

Bulgaria	99–65	Poland
Scoring by quarter: 23–8, 13–24, 28–13, 35–20
Pts: Videnov, Stoykov 26; Rebs: B. Mladenov 8 Asts: Videnov, H. Dimitrov, Stoykov 3		Pts: Nordgaard 25; Rebs: Nordgaard 9 Asts: Skibniewski, Koszarek 2

Palace of Culture and Sports, Varna
Attendance: 1,000
Referees: Konstantinos Koromilas (GRE), Peter Vigh (HUN), Damir Kunosic (BIH)

13 Sep 2006
19:00

Boxscore

Sweden	81–71	Ukraine
Scoring by quarter: 20–21, 22–10, 19–27, 20–13
Pts: Ringström 12; Rebs: Nnamaka 8 Asts: Ilunga, Grant 6		Pts: Podorvannyy 15; Rebs: Gurtovyy 11; Asts: Skutyelnik 5

Arena of Sundsvall Dragons, Sundsvall
Attendance: 1,300
Referees: Ivan Zachara (CZE)

16 Sep 2006
17:00

Boxscore

Sweden	79–50	Bulgaria
Scoring by quarter: 13–6, 20–24, 19–11, 27–9
Pts: Ringström 23; Rebs: Ringström 9 Asts: Levin 5		Pts: Stoykov 14; Rebs: Banev 7 Asts: Radionov, Videnov, Bozov, Stoykov 2

Arena of BBK Solna, Solna
Attendance: 2,000
Referees: Francisco De La Maza (ESP), Fedor Dmitriev (BLR)

16 Sep 2006
19:00

Boxscore

Ukraine	80–74	Poland
Scoring by quarter: 26–16, 20–20, 21–15, 13–23
Pts: Pecherov 18; Rebs: Pecherov 7 Asts: Skutyelnik 6		Pts: Korytek 19; Rebs: Korytek 9 Asts: Koszarek 3

Arena of BC Kyiv, Kyiv
Attendance: 2,500
Referees: Virginijus Dovidavicius (LTU), Marko Juras (SRB)

==== Group 2 ====
Team	Pld	W	L	PF	PA	PD	Pts	Tie
Portugal	6	4	2	462	447	+15	10	
Macedonia	6	3	3	486	493	−7	9	1–1, +1
Bosnia and Herzegovina	6	3	3	482	459	+23	9	1–1, -1
Israel	6	2	4	431	462	−31	8	

Rules=1) Points; 2) Head-to-head results; 3) Points difference; 4) Points scored.

31 Aug 2006
20:10

Boxscore

Israel	88–81	Bosnia and Herzegovina
Scoring by quarter: 23–20, 25–22, 19–19, 13–16
Pts: Arnold 21; Rebs: Tamir 9 Asts: Halperin 6		Pts: Teletović 22; Rebs: Hukic 5 Asts: Vasiljević, Mrsic 2

Universiada Hall, Sofia
Referees: Engin Kennerman (TUR), Christos Mastraftsis (GRE), Marin Mehandjiev (BUL)

31 Aug 2006
21:00

Boxscore

Portugal	108–90	Macedonia
Scoring by quarter: 18–26, 27–14, 32–26, 31–24
Pts: Minhava 23; Rebs: Minhava, Évora 5 Asts: Minhava 4		Pts: Stik 24; Rebs: Gechevski, Stik 6 Asts: Stefanov 4

Multiusos de Trancoso, Trancoso
Attendance: 1,000
Referees: Keith Williams(ENG)

3 Sep 2006
20:00

Boxscore

Bosnia and Herzegovina	78–80	Portugal
Scoring by quarter: 13–21, 20–18, 24–17, 21–24
Pts: Hukic 17; Rebs: Bajramovic 8 Asts: Vasiljevic 4		Pts: Coragem Jordão 16; Rebs: da Silva 6 Asts: da Silva 6

Sport Hall Skenderija, Sarajevo
Attendance: 3,000
Referees: Marko Juras (SRB)

3 Sep 2006
20:30

Boxscore

Macedonia	90–87	Israel
Scoring by quarter: 25–12, 21–24, 18–18, 26–33
Pts: Stik 24; Rebs: Gechevski 12; Asts: Stefanov 9		Pts: Arnold 30; Rebs: Hagag, Arnold, Halperin, Tamir 3 Asts: Halperin 5

Arena of Rabotnicki, Skopje
Attendance: 1,500
Referees: Milija Vojinovic (SRB), Panagiotis Anastopoulos (GRE)

6 Sep 2006
18:00

Boxscore

Macedonia	81–77	Bosnia and Herzegovina
Scoring by quarter: 14–14, 26–13, 20–24, 21–26
Pts: Stefanov 27; Rebs: Stik 7 Asts: Stefanov 3		Pts: Krupalija 18; Rebs: Bajramovic 10; Asts: Hukic 5

Arena of Rabotnicki, Skopje
Attendance: 2,000

6 Sep 2006
18:30

Boxscore

Israel	61–67	Portugal
Scoring by quarter: 17–19, 19–16, 11–8, 14–24
Pts: Halperin 16; Rebs: Green 11; Asts: Shason, Halperin 3		Pts: Cunha 17; Rebs: Cunha 13; Asts: Minhava 2

Universiada Hall, Sofia

9 Sep 2006
20:00

Boxscore

Bosnia and Herzegovina	85–63	Israel
Scoring by quarter: 23–13, 22–23, 18–14, 22–13
Pts: Jazvin 17; Rebs: Hukic 5 Asts: Hukic 3		Pts: Arnold 25; Rebs: Arnold 7 Asts: Hagag 4

Sport Hall Skenderija, Sarajevo
Attendance: 4,000
Referees: Luigi Lamonica (ITA)

9 Sep 2006
20:30

Boxscore

Macedonia	83–63	Portugal
Scoring by quarter: 19–20, 15–12, 20–16, 29–15
Pts: Stefanov 19; Rebs: Tasovski, Stik 8 Asts: Kurtović 4		Pts: Coragem Jordão 15; Rebs: Cunha 13; Asts: da Silva 5

Arena of Rabotnicki, Skopje
Attendance: 2,000
Referees: Marek Cmikiewicz (POL), Miroslav Tomov (BUL)

13 Sep 2006
16:30

Boxscore

Portugal	75–86	Bosnia and Herzegovina
Scoring by quarter: 10–23, 22–32, 16–14, 27–17
Pts: Cunha 21; Rebs: Cunha 10; Asts: Minhava 5		Pts: Bajramovic 26; Rebs: Hukic 6 Asts: Vasiljevic 7

Municipality Sports Hall, Paços de Ferreira
Referees: Marco Giansanti (ITA)

13 Sep 2006
18:00

Boxscore

Israel	83–70	Macedonia
Scoring by quarter: 32–18, 15–10, 22–22, 14–20
Pts: Halperin 21; Rebs: Green 14; Asts: Hagag 5		Pts: Gechevski 21; Rebs: Gechevski 9 Asts: Stefanov 2

Universiada Hall, Sofia
Attendance: 1,000
Referees: Sasa Pukl (SLO), Oskars Lucis (LAT)

16 Sep 2006
19:15

Boxscore

Portugal	69–49	Israel
Scoring by quarter: 18–18, 15–14, 24–7, 12–10
Pts: Évora 27; Rebs: Évora 9 Asts: da Silva 6		Pts: Halperin 11; Rebs: Arnold 7 Asts: Katz, Green, Halperin, Tamir 1

Pavilhao Rota dos Moveis, Paredes
Referees: Carlos Mateus (FRA)

16 Sep 2006
20:00

Boxscore

Bosnia and Herzegovina	75–72	Macedonia
Scoring by quarter: 15–20, 19–18, 17–20, 24–14
Pts: Domercant 22; Rebs: Krupalija 7 Asts: Kojadinovic 4		Pts: Stefanov 27; Rebs: Stik, Dimitrovski 7 Asts: Stefanov, Dimitrovski 3

Sport Hall Skenderija, Sarajevo
Attendance: 5,000
Referees: Mehmet Keseratar (TUR), Radomir Vojinovic (MNE)

==== Group 3 ====
Team	Pld	W	L	PF	PA	PD	Pts
Russia	6	5	1	507	422	+85	11
Czech Republic	6	4	2	458	441	+17	10
Hungary	6	2	4	420	439	−19	8
Belgium	6	1	5	400	483	−83	7

31 Aug 2006
17:40

Boxscore

Czech Republic	85–67	Belgium
Scoring by quarter: 21–20, 21–16, 21–15, 22–16
Pts: Welsch 31; Rebs: Welsch, Barton, Benda 7 Asts: Benes 6		Pts: Beghin 20; Rebs: Hervelle 13; Asts: Hervelle, Lauwers 2

Mestska viceucelova hala, Opava
Attendance: 1,500
Referees: Grzegorz Ziemblicki (POL)

31 Aug 2006
19:00

Boxscore

Russia	82–62	Hungary
Scoring by quarter: 17–17, 25–12, 19–18, 21–15
Pts: Kholden 21; Rebs: Monia, Savrasenko 7 Asts: Ponkrashov 2		Pts: Simon, Báder 14; Rebs: Kámán, Gulyás 7 Asts: Kámán 2

Arena of UNICS, Kazan
Attendance: 5,500
Referees: Stelian Banica (ROU), Jakub Zamojski (POL), Sergiy Chaykovskyy (UKR)

3 Sep 2006
16:00

Boxscore

Belgium	91–80	Russia
Scoring by quarter: 24–16, 19–17, 29–21, 19–26
Pts: Hervelle 24; Rebs: Hervelle 11; Asts: Muya 4		Pts: Kholden 33; Rebs: Monia 9 Asts: Padius 2

Sportplaza Leuven, Leuven
Attendance: 1,200
Referees: Mauro Pozzana (ITA), Carlos Mateus (FRA)

3 Sep 2006
18:00

Boxscore

Hungary	76–80	Czech Republic
Scoring by quarter: 16–16, 25–21, 19–21, 16–22
Pts: Gulyás 27; Rebs: Báder 11; Asts: Simon 4		Pts: Welsch 21; Rebs: J. Houška 5 Asts: Benes, Vrubl 3

Arena of Falco Leptek, Szombathely
Attendance: 2,400
Referees: Volodymyr Drabikovskyi (UKR), Tomasz Trawicki (POL)

6 Sep 2006
19:30

Boxscore

Russia	104–81	Czech Republic
Scoring by quarter: 32–16, 24–9, 24–33, 24–23
Pts: Khryapa 23; Rebs: Khryapa 13; Asts: Samoylenko 4		Pts: Barton 27; Rebs: Barton 6 Asts: Benes, Hájek, Barton 2

Arena of Ural Great, Perm
Attendance: 7,000
Referees: Jaroslav Janac (SVK), Sergiy Chebyshev (UKR), Apostolos Kalpakas (SWE)

6 Sep 2006
20:15

Boxscore

Belgium	59–73	Hungary
Scoring by quarter: 17–15, 7–20, 15–16, 20–22
Pts: Hervelle 12; Rebs: Hervelle 11; Asts: Moors 4		Pts: Kámán 17; Rebs: Báder 10; Asts: Simon, A. Horvát, Kámán 3

Sportplaza Leuven, Leuven
Attendance: 1,000
Referees: Fernando Rocha (POR)

9 Sep 2006
18:00

Boxscore

Hungary	70–76	Russia
Scoring by quarter: 17–18, 11–17, 21–18, 21–23
Pts: Báder 17; Rebs: Báder 20; Asts: Báder 5		Pts: Kholden 24; Rebs: Savrasenko 8 Asts: Khryapa 2

Oláh Gábor utcai Sportcsarnok, Debrecen
Attendance: 1,500
Referees: Marcin Kowalski (POL), Anthonie Sinterniklaas (NED)

9 Sep 2006
20:15

Boxscore

Belgium	61–74	Czech Republic
Scoring by quarter: 14–21, 20–17, 16–15, 11–21
Pts: Van Der Jonckheyd 15; Rebs: Hervelle 10; Asts: Lauwers 6		Pts: Barton, Benda 16; Rebs: J. Houška, Starosta 7 Asts: Welsch 6

Sportplaza Leuven, Leuven
Attendance: 1,000
Referees: Eric Bertrand (SUI)

13 Sep 2006
17:40

Boxscore

Czech Republic	83–64	Hungary
Scoring by quarter: 21–16, 24–14, 17–23, 21–11
Pts: Welsch 23; Rebs: Benda 9 Asts: Welsch 7		Pts: Gulyás 19; Rebs: Báder 5 Asts: Simon 4

Arena of BK Opava, Opava
Attendance: 1,500
Referees: Igor Poljansek (SLO), Daniel Hierrezuelo (ESP), Alfred Jovovic (CRO)

13 Sep 2006
19:30

Boxscore

Russia	96–63	Belgium
Scoring by quarter: 28–24, 29–15, 16–14, 23–10
Pts: Kholden 22; Rebs: Samoylenko, Khryapa, Savrasenko 6 Asts: Samoylenko 5		Pts: Mbenga 12; Rebs: Mbenga 8 Asts: Moors 4

Arena of Ural Great, Perm
Attendance: 7,000

16 Sep 2006
17:40

Boxscore

Czech Republic	55–69	Russia
Scoring by quarter: 15–18, 20–13, 10–21, 10–17
Pts: Prásil 15; Rebs: Barton, Benda 12; Asts: Prásil 4		Pts: Dmitriev 14; Rebs: Khryapa 9 Asts: Bykov 5

Arena of BK Opava, Opava
Attendance: 2,100

16 Sep 2006
18:00

Boxscore

Hungary	75–59	Belgium
Scoring by quarter: 13–13, 19–19, 23–10, 20–17
Pts: Németh 18; Rebs: Báder 11; Asts: A. Horvát 3		Pts: Mbenga 24; Rebs: Mbenga 13; Asts: Van Der Jonckheyd 3

Arena of Albacomp-UPC, Székesfehérvár
Attendance: 1,000
Referees: Stelian Banica (ROU)

==== Group 4 ====
Team	Pld	W	L	PF	PA	PD	Pts
Croatia	6	5	1	498	397	+101	11
Latvia	6	4	2	454	423	+31	10
Estonia	6	2	4	365	432	−67	8
Denmark	6	1	5	405	470	−65	7

31 Aug 2006
18:00

Boxscore

Croatia	84–56	Latvia
Scoring by quarter: 19–11, 18–20, 28–11, 19–14
Pts: Popovic 22; Rebs: Kasun 10; Asts: Planinic 5		Pts: Cipruss 16; Rebs: Helmanis, Janicenoks 5 Asts: K. Valters 3

Arena of KK Šibenik, Šibenik
Attendance: 2,000
Referees: Nikolaos Pitsilkas (GRE)

31 Aug 2006
18:30

Boxscore

Estonia	51–50	Denmark
Scoring by quarter: 17–15, 15–7, 14–14, 5–14
Pts: Allingu 12; Rebs: Kikerpill 8 Asts: Tein 4		Pts: Andersen 14; Rebs: Andersen 10; Asts: Drejer 3

Arena of BC Kalev, Tallinn
Attendance: 4,500

3 Sep 2006
15:00

Boxscore

Denmark	67–92	Croatia
Scoring by quarter: 20–14, 11–34, 23–18, 13–26
Pts: Drejer, Andersen 18; Rebs: Andersen 8 Asts: Jensen, Drejer, Thuesen 3		Pts: Planinic 20; Rebs: Kasun 11; Asts: Popovic 6

Arena of BC Aarhus, Aarhus
Attendance: 1,700
Referees: Robert Paulik (CZE)

3 Sep 2006
19:00

Boxscore

Latvia	87–57	Estonia
Scoring by quarter: 30–13, 18–10, 19–23, 20–11
Pts: Janicenoks 15; Rebs: Helmanis, Grafs 7 Asts: Helmanis, K. Valters, Janicenoks 4		Pts: Kikerpill 22; Rebs: Kriisa 6 Asts: Kriisa 5

Arena Riga, Riga
Attendance: 3,500
Referees: Karolina Andersson (FIN)

6 Sep 2006
17:45

Boxscore

Croatia	76–47	Estonia
Scoring by quarter: 21–10, 16–10, 21–13, 18–14
Pts: Popovic 16; Rebs: Banic 7 Asts: Ukic, Kus 4		Pts: Tein, Allingu 9 Rebs: Kangur 8 Asts: Kriisa 5

Sport Arena, Nova Gradiška
Attendance: 1,500

6 Sep 2006
19:00

Boxscore

Denmark	74–90	Latvia
Scoring by quarter: 14–25, 12–22, 27–18, 21–25
Pts: Andersen 24; Rebs: Drejer, Iversen, Andersen 5 Asts: Drejer 5		Pts: Helmanis 20; Rebs: K. Valters, Cipruss 8 Asts: K. Valters 11

Arena of BC Aarhus, Aarhus
Referees: José Araujo (POR)

9 Sep 2006
15:00

Boxscore

Denmark	69–68	Estonia
Scoring by quarter: 24–19, 13–21, 19–14, 13–14
Pts: Andersen 15; Rebs: Drejer 8 Asts: Drejer 7		Pts: Kriisa, Kikerpill 16; Rebs: Kangur 8 Asts: Kriisa 5

Arena of BC Aarhus, Aarhus
Referees: Chris Dodds (GBR)

9 Sep 2006
19:30

Boxscore

Latvia	70–78	Croatia
Scoring by quarter: 14–20, 16–19, 22–24, 18–15
Pts: K. Valters 17; Rebs: Cipruss 11; Asts: K. Valters 5		Pts: Popovic 21; Rebs: Tomas, Markota 4 Asts: Ukic 4

Arena Riga, Riga
Attendance: 4,000
Referees: Sergiy Chaykovskyy (UKR)

13 Sep 2006
17:45

Boxscore

Croatia	91–79	Denmark
Scoring by quarter: 25–21, 19–22, 24–15, 23–21
Pts: Banic 21; Rebs: Longin, Andric 7 Asts: Planinic 5		Pts: Clarance, Drejer 16; Rebs: Andersen 9 Asts: Jensen, Clarance 4

Gradska Sportska Dvorana, Crikvenica
Referees: Marcello Reatto (ITA)

13 Sep 2006
18:00

Boxscore

Estonia	64–73	Latvia
Scoring by quarter: 15–22, 11–15, 30–20, 8–16
Pts: Tein 14; Rebs: Allingu 10; Asts: Tein 4		Pts: Helmanis 18; Rebs: Skele, K. Valters 6 Asts: K. Valters 5

Arena of BC Kalev, Tallinn
Attendance: 3,000
Referees: Milan Mazic (SRB)

16 Sep 2006
17:00

Boxscore

Estonia	78–77	Croatia
Scoring by quarter: 25–11, 13–18, 13–25, 27–23
Pts: Tein 25; Rebs: Kangur 7 Asts: Tein 6		Pts: Kus, Peric 14; Rebs: Longin 9 Asts: Longin 3

Arena of BC Kalev, Tallinn
Attendance: 3,000
Referees: Petr Sudek (SVK)

16 Sep 2006
19:30

Boxscore

Latvia	78–66	Denmark
Scoring by quarter: 20–19, 19–9, 17–19, 22–19
Pts: Cipruss 28; Rebs: Cipruss 9 Asts: K. Valters 5		Pts: Andersen 20; Rebs: Andersen 12; Asts: Colman 6

Arena Riga, Riga
Attendance: 4,500

=== Additional qualifying round ===
Advanced to final qualifying stage
Competed for relegation

==== Group A ====
Team	Pld	W	L	PF	PA	PD	Pts
Bosnia and Herzegovina	4	2	2	297	283	+14	6
Bulgaria	4	2	2	287	292	−5	6
Hungary	4	2	2	290	299	−9	6

Rules=1) Points; 2) Head-to-head results; 3) Points difference; 4) Points scored.

8 Aug 2007
20:30

Boxscore

Bosnia and Herzegovina	75–71 (OT)	Bulgaria
Scoring by quarter: 19–17, 10–12, 23–23, 13–13, Overtime: 10–6
Pts: Vasiljević 21; Rebs: Bajramovic 10; Asts: Vasiljević, Hukic 3		Pts: Angelov 16; Rebs: Stoykov 6 Asts: Blakney 2

Sport Hall SD Cazin, Cazin
Attendance: 4,000
Referees: Ilija Belosevic (SRB), Sreten Radovic (CRO), Marius Ciulin (ROU)

11 Aug 2007
18:00

Boxscore

Bulgaria	79–74	Hungary
Scoring by quarter: 23–27, 27–14, 6–21, 23–12
Pts: Stoykov 17; Rebs: Blakney, D. Ivanov 7 Asts: Blakney 8		Pts: Báder 22; Rebs: Báder 7 Asts: Simon 7

Arena of BC CSKA, Sofia
Attendance: 3,500
Referees: Engin Kennerman (TUR), Zoran Zlatevski (MKD), Seffi Shemmesh (ISR)

15 Aug 2007
19:00

Boxscore

Hungary	68–83	Bosnia and Herzegovina
Scoring by quarter: 15–14, 16–20, 21–25, 16–24
Pts: Németh 15; Rebs: Báder 7 Asts: Simon 5		Pts: Kojadinovic 16; Rebs: Hukic 10; Asts: Vasiljević 3

Bujtosi Szabadidő Csarnok, Nyíregyháza
Attendance: 2,200
Referees: Oscar Lefwerth (SWE), Vaclav Lukes (CZE), Boris Gabara (SVK)

18 Aug 2007
18:00

Boxscore

Bulgaria	70–69	Bosnia and Herzegovina
Scoring by quarter: 13–17, 20–19, 20–17, 17–16
Pts: K. Ivanov 20; Rebs: D. Ivanov 9 Asts: Blakney 8		Pts: Hukic 16; Rebs: Teletović 7 Asts: Vasiljević 6

Arena of BC CSKA, Sofia
Attendance: 3,500
Referees: Marjan Stojovski (MKD), Georgios Tanatzis (GRE), Sergiy Chebyshev (UKR)

22 Aug 2007
19:00

Boxscore

Hungary	74–67	Bulgaria
Scoring by quarter: 13–16, 22–12, 14–16, 25–23
Pts: Németh 27; Rebs: Bencze 8 Asts: Simon 5		Pts: D. Ivanov 15; Rebs: K. Ivanov 6 Asts: Stoykov 3

Arena of Falco Leptek, Szombathely
Attendance: 1,200
Referees: Lazaros Voreadis (GRE), Grzegorz Ziemblicki (POL), Robert Paulik (CZE)

25 Aug 2007
20:30

Boxscore

Bosnia and Herzegovina	70–74	Hungary
Scoring by quarter: 21–21, 21–9, 13–17, 15–27
Pts: Bavcic 13; Rebs: Bavcic 11; Asts: Hukic 4		Pts: Báder 14; Rebs: Báder 6 Asts: Németh 3

Sport Hall SD Cazin, Cazin
Attendance: 5,200
Referees: Recep Ankarali (TUR), Zoran Sutulovic (MNE), Christos Christodoulou (GRE)

==== Group B ====
Team	Pld	W	L	PF	PA	PD	Pts	Tie
Macedonia	4	3	1	316	253	+63	7	1–1 +39
Estonia	4	3	1	247	265	−18	7	1–1 -39
Sweden	4	0	4	235	280	−45	4	

Rules=1) Points; 2) Head-to-head results; 3) Points difference; 4) Points scored.

9 Aug 2007
19:00

Boxscore

Sweden	50–57	Estonia
Scoring by quarter: 10–12, 14–13, 10–15, 16–17
Pts: Mbemba 9 Rebs: Maraker 7 Asts: Levin 6		Pts: Kriisa 14; Rebs: Kangur 9 Asts: Sokk, Kullamäe 2

Fryshuset, Stockholm
Attendance: 2,136
Referees: Anibal Castano (FRA), Arnis Ozols (LAT), Marcin Kowalski (POL)

13 Aug 2007
19:00

Boxscore

Estonia	72–66	Macedonia
Scoring by quarter: 14–10, 25–17, 16–21, 17–18
Pts: Müürsepp 17; Rebs: Tein 8 Asts: Kriisa 4		Pts: Ilievski 20; Rebs: Tasovski, Wilkinson 7 Asts: Stefanov 4

Arena of BC Kalev, Tallinn
Attendance: 5,000
Referees: Romualdas Brazauskas (LTU), Marek Cmikiewicz (POL), Sergiy Zashchuk (UKR)

17 Aug 2007
20:30

Boxscore

Macedonia	77–58	Sweden
Scoring by quarter: 15–16, 17–20, 19–8, 26–14
Pts: Stefanov 22; Rebs: Stefanov, Wilkinson 6 Asts: Stefanov 5		Pts: Jönzén 12; Rebs: Grant, Ringström 8 Asts: Levin 5

Arena of Rabotnicki, Skopje
Attendance: 1,000
Referees: Petr Sudek (SVK), Dimitar Gologanov (BUL), Omer Esteron (ISR)

20 Aug 2007
19:00

Boxscore

Estonia	68–54	Sweden
Scoring by quarter: 12–18, 25–16, 18–11, 13–9
Pts: Müürsepp 18; Rebs: Tein 11; Asts: Tein, Kangur 3		Pts: Grant 11; Rebs: Ringström 4 Asts: Levin 3

Arena of BC Kalev, Tallinn
Attendance: 6,500
Referees: Volodymyr Drabikovskyi (UKR), Petri Mäntylä (FIN), Gennadi Ponomarev (RUS)

22 Aug 2007
20:30

Boxscore

Macedonia	95–50	Estonia
Scoring by quarter: 18–18, 28–13, 29–11, 20–8
Pts: Stefanov 17; Rebs: Wilkinson 7 Asts: Ilievski 4		Pts: Kangur 11; Rebs: Allingu 7 Asts: Sokk 3

Sports Centre Jane Sandanski II, Skopje
Attendance: 1,500
Referees: Srdan Dozai (CRO), Luigi Lamonica (ITA), Georgios Tanatzis (GRE)

25 Aug 2007
19:30

Boxscore

Sweden	73–78	Macedonia
Scoring by quarter: 21–21, 22–15, 15–22, 15–20
Pts: Lindquist 21; Rebs: Ringström 6 Asts: Levin, Grant 2		Pts: Ilievski 23; Rebs: Wilkinson 9 Asts: Gechevski 5

Pontushallen, Luleå
Referees: Sergey Bulanov (RUS), Dubravko Muhvic (CRO), Juris Kokainis (LAT)

==== Group C ====
Team	Pld	W	L	PF	PA	PD	Pts	Tie
Israel	6	5	1	485	421	+64	11	1–1 +10
Belgium	6	5	1	442	400	+42	11	1–1 -10
Ukraine	6	1	5	409	445	−36	7	1–1 +5
Denmark	6	1	5	417	487	−70	7	1–1 -5

Rules=1) Points; 2) Head-to-head results; 3) Points difference; 4) Points scored.

8 Aug 2007
19:00

Boxscore

Ukraine	45–70	Belgium
Scoring by quarter: 13–16, 13–13, 14–18, 5–23
Pts: Butskyy 13; Rebs: Lishchuk 7 Asts: Butskyy 3		Pts: Beghin 19; Rebs: Hervelle 16; Asts: Hervelle 4

Arena of BC Kyiv, Kyiv
Attendance: 1,000
Referees: Mehmet Keseratar (TUR), Grzegorz Bachanski (POL), Marko Juras (SRB)

8 Aug 2007
19:00

Boxscore

Denmark	60–72	Israel
Scoring by quarter: 19–16, 15–18, 15–16, 11–22
Pts: Johansen 17; Rebs: Colman, Johansen 5 Asts: Clarance, Colman, Johansen 2		Pts: Halperin 19; Rebs: Eliyahu, Tamir 6 Asts: Hagag 6

Arena of BC Aarhus, Aarhus
Referees: Daniel Hierrezuelo (ESP), Eddie Viator (FRA), Anthonie Sinterniklaas (NED)

11 Aug 2007
20:00

Boxscore

Belgium	80–66	Denmark
Scoring by quarter: 18–21, 15–16, 30–14, 17–15
Pts: Hervelle 22; Rebs: Hervelle 12; Asts: Bosco 5		Pts: Johansen 19; Rebs: Johansen 10; Asts: Darbo, Colman, Johansen 2

Spiroudome, Charleroi
Attendance: 2,000
Referees: Antonio Coelho (POR), Konstantinos Mouzakis (GRE), Oliver Krause (GER)

11 Aug 2007
21:00

Boxscore

Israel	81–73	Ukraine
Scoring by quarter: 17–13, 25–19, 16–25, 23–16
Pts: Eliyahu 20; Rebs: Eliyahu, Green 7 Asts: Halperin 5		Pts: Kolchenko 30; Rebs: Drozdov 8 Asts: Butskyy 3

Sport Palace, Tel Aviv
Attendance: 4,500
Referees: Christos Mastraftsis (GRE), Petar Obradovic (BIH), Vladimir Tsekov (BUL)

15 Aug 2007
19:00

Boxscore

Ukraine	74–64	Denmark
Scoring by quarter: 18–11, 10–16, 27–21, 19–16
Pts: Kolchenko 17; Rebs: Lishchuk 11; Asts: Kolchenko 3		Pts: Soltau 12; Rebs: Soltau 9 Asts: Colman 3

Arena of BC Kyiv, Kyiv
Attendance: 1,500
Referees: Dragan Neskovic (SRB), Chrisostomos Schinas (GRE), Zaza Machaladze (GEO)

15 Aug 2007
19:00

Boxscore

Israel	85–66	Belgium
Scoring by quarter: 28–17, 19–8, 22–26, 16–15
Pts: Halperin 29; Rebs: Green 12; Asts: Tapiro, Halperin 6		Pts: Hervelle 16; Rebs: Hervelle 10; Asts: Van Rossom 5

Sport Palace, Tel Aviv
Attendance: 9,000
Referees: Milivoje Jovcic (SRB), Milan Mazic (SRB), Panagiotis Anastopoulos (GRE)

18 Aug 2007
20:00

Boxscore

Belgium	72–69	Ukraine
Scoring by quarter: 16–11, 15–23, 15–18, 26–17
Pts: Hervelle 21; Rebs: Hervelle 13; Asts: Moors 5		Pts: Lishchuk 17; Rebs: Lishchuk 8 Asts: Kolchenko, Drozdov, Butskyy 2

Spiroudome, Charleroi
Attendance: 2,500
Referees: Juan Arteaga (ESP), Robert Hickman (ENG), Fabien Conderanne (FRA)

18 Aug 2007
21:00

Boxscore

Israel	105–76	Denmark
Scoring by quarter: 32–20, 27–15, 29–16, 17–25
Pts: Halperin 22; Rebs: Green 8 Asts: Tapiro 8		Pts: Johansen 17; Rebs: Johansen 8 Asts: Jakobsen 3

Sport Palace, Tel Aviv
Attendance: 8,000
Referees: Andrej Jersan (SLO), Antonis Demetriou (CYP), Aleksandar Milojevic (MKD)

22 Aug 2007
17:00

Boxscore

Denmark	61–71	Belgium
Scoring by quarter: 9–17, 13–9, 14–28, 25–17
Pts: Iversen, Johansen 15; Rebs: Johansen 10; Asts: Jakobsen, Johansen 3		Pts: Beghin 23; Rebs: Beghin, Hervelle, Van Der Jonckheyd 8 Asts: Moors 5

Vejlby Risskovhallen, Aarhus
Referees: Stelian Banica (ROU), Kristinn Oskarsson (ISL), Markus Grievink (GER)

22 Aug 2007
19:00

Boxscore

Ukraine	63–68	Israel
Scoring by quarter: 15–18, 19–18, 17–16, 12–16
Pts: Lishchuk 24; Rebs: Lishchuk 8 Asts: Skutyelnik, Butskyy 3		Pts: Halperin 19; Rebs: Green 11; Asts: Tapiro 4

Arena of BC Kyiv, Kyiv
Attendance: 1,500
Referees: Ivo Dolinek (CZE), Olegs Latisevs (LAT), Oliver Krause (GER)

25 Aug 2007
14:30

Boxscore

Denmark	90–85	Ukraine
Scoring by quarter: 22–23, 18–17, 26–17, 24–28
Pts: Colman 21; Rebs: Iversen 8 Asts: Johansen 6		Pts: Kryvych 29; Rebs: Lishchuk, Kravtsov 7 Asts: Skutyelnik 5

Arena of BC Aarhus, Aarhus
Referees: Ivan Zachara (CZE), Janusz Calik (POL), Stephen Ellis (ENG)

25 Aug 2007
20:00

Boxscore

Belgium	83–74	Israel
Scoring by quarter: 25–25, 16–16, 19–15, 23–18
Pts: Moors 18; Rebs: Hervelle 13; Asts: Van Rossom 4		Pts: Tapiro 14; Rebs: Tapiro 8 Asts: Tapiro 3

Spiroudome, Charleroi
Attendance: 5,000
Referees: Nikolaos Pitsilkas (GRE), Carlos Mateus (FRA), Emilio Perez (ESP)

=== Final qualifying stage ===
Qualified for FIBA EuroBasket 2007

Times given below are in Central European Summer Time (UTC+2).

Team	Pld	W	L	PF	PA	PD	Pts
Israel	2	2	0	159	147	+12	4
Macedonia	2	1	1	160	155	+5	3
Bosnia and Herzegovina	2	0	2	123	140	−17	2

29 August 2007
20:30

Boxscore

Macedonia	73–63	Bosnia and Herzegovina
Scoring by quarter: 31–13, 10–17, 12–21, 20–12
Pts: V. Stefanov 18; Rebs: Wilkinson 12; Asts: V. Stefanov, Wilkinson 3		Pts: Teletović 16; Rebs: Nesovic, Teletović, Bavcic 6 Asts: Hukic 3

Pavelló, Menorca, Spain
Attendance: 1,500

30 August 2007
20:30

Boxscore

Bosnia and Herzegovina	60–67	Israel
Scoring by quarter: 7–23, 27–15, 15–16, 11–13
Pts: Teletović 17; Rebs: Teletović 6 Asts: Vasiljević, Kojadinovic, 3		Pts: Tamir 15; Rebs: Kozikaro, Green 7 Asts: Tapiro 6

Pavelló, Menorca, Spain
Attendance: 1,500

31 August 2007
20:30

Boxscore

Israel	92–87	Macedonia
Scoring by quarter: 25–18, 17–23, 29–19, 21–27
Pts: Halperin 26; Rebs: Kozikaro 10; Asts: Tapiro 7		Pts: Ilievski 24; Rebs: Wilkinson 5 Asts: V. Stefanov, Ilievski, R. Stefanov, Wilkinson 2

Pavelló, Menorca, Spain
Attendance: 1,700

=== Relegation stage ===
Relegated to Division B

Times given below are in Central European Summer Time (UTC+2).

Team	Pld	W	L	PF	PA	PD	Pts
Hungary	2	2	0	176	134	+42	4
Sweden	2	1	1	130	130	0	3
Denmark	2	0	2	125	167	−42	2

29 August 2007
18:00

Boxscore

Sweden	66–55	Denmark
Scoring by quarter: 21–11, 11–14, 12–13, 22–17
Pts: Levin 13; Rebs: Nnamaka 9 Asts: Levin 4		Pts: Johansen 13; Rebs: Soltau 6 Asts: Colman, Jakobsen, Iversen 2

Pavelló, Menorca, Spain
Attendance: 1,000

30 August 2007
18:00

Boxscore

Denmark	70–101	Hungary
Scoring by quarter: 29–15, 15–29, 15–26, 11–21
Pts: Johansen 17; Rebs: Johansen 6 Asts: Darbo, Johansen 4		Pts: Németh 26; Rebs: Bencze 7 Asts: Simon 9

Pavelló, Menorca, Spain
Attendance: 1,000

31 August 2007
18:00

Boxscore

Hungary	75–64	Sweden
Scoring by quarter: 24–17, 10–12, 15–19, 26–16
Pts: Németh 16; Rebs: Báder, Kámán 6 Asts: Németh 4		Pts: Kjellbom 18; Rebs: Ringström 8 Asts: Grant 4

Pavelló, Menorca, Spain

== Division B ==
=== Qualifying round ===
Advanced to the qualification games

Group A

Team	Pld	W	L	PF	PA	PD	Pts
Switzerland	6	5	1	409	347	+62	11
Romania	6	5	1	411	369	+42	11
Ireland	6	1	5	380	438	−58	7
Cyprus	6	1	5	390	436	−46	7

Group B

Team	Pld	W	L	PF	PA	PD	Pts
Great Britain	8	6	2	618	495	+123	14
Netherlands	8	5	3	590	540	+50	13
Belarus	8	5	3	575	547	+28	13
Slovakia	8	4	4	589	593	−4	12
Albania	8	0	8	534	731	−197	8

Group C

Team	Pld	W	L	PF	PA	PD	Pts
Finland	8	7	1	730	535	+195	15
Georgia	8	6	2	640	549	+91	14
Iceland	8	4	4	635	644	−9	12
Austria	8	3	5	555	590	−35	11
Luxembourg	8	0	8	473	715	−242	8

=== Qualification games ===
11 September 2007
18:30

Game 1

Romania	83–76	Finland
Scoring by quarter: 21–15, 23–22, 23–17, 16–22
Pts: Helcioiu 18; Rebs: Popescu 9 Asts: Helcioiu, Stanescu, Kalala 4		Pts: Rannikko 29; Rebs: Matinen 8 Asts: Rannikko 4

Sala Sporturilor City Arena, Târgu Mureș, Romania
Attendance: 2,000
Referees: Ivan Zachara (CZE), Marcin Kowalski (POL), Fabien Conderanne (FRA)

11 September 2007
19:30

Game 1

Great Britain	74–41	Switzerland
Scoring by quarter: 21–11, 11–7, 23–8, 19–15
Pts: Deng 31; Rebs: Deng 12; Asts: Midgley, Deng 4		Pts: Sefolosha 21; Rebs: Sefolosha 9 Asts: Sefolosha, Vogt, Stockalper 1

Sheffield Arena, Sheffield, Great Britain
Attendance: 1,500
Referees: Petr Sudek (SVK), Apostolos Kalpakas (SWE), Carlos Mateus (FRA)

15 September 2007
18:00

Game 2

Finland	111–61	Romania
Scoring by quarter: 30–12, 27–13, 33–11, 21–25
Pts: Virtanen 23; Rebs: Muurinen 8 Asts: Muurinen, Rannikko, Koponen 3		Pts: Stanescu 20; Rebs: Burlacu 10; Asts: Burlacu, Helcioiu 3
Finland won 187–144, and advanced to Eurobasket 2009 Division A

Arena of Pussihukat, Vantaa, Finland
Attendance: 2760
Referees: Romualdas Brazauskas (LTU), Boris Schmidt (GER), Juris Kokainis (LAT)

15 September 2007
15:15

Game 2

Switzerland	78–89	Great Britain
Scoring by quarter: 18–23, 20–23, 21–21, 19–22
Pts: Sefolosha 17; Rebs: Stockalper 4 Asts: Sefolosha 9		Pts: Archibald 23; Rebs: Archibald, Betts 6 Asts: Midgley 4
Great Britain won 163–119, and advanced to Eurobasket 2009 Division A

Arena of Geneve Basket, Genèva, Switzerland
Attendance: 1,750
Referees: Christos Christodoulou (GRE), Carmelo Lo Guzzo (ITA), Damir Javor (SLO)
