= FIBA EuroBasket 2005 Division B =

The FIBA EuroBasket 2005 Division B was the first EuroBasket Division B tournament, the lower tier of the EuroBasket Tournament. At the same time that Division A had the European Championship, division B had a championship to determine which teams would get promoted into division A for the following year.

FYR Macedonia and Denmark were promoted to the EuroBasket 2007 qualification.

== Format ==
The fifteen teams were allocated in four groups. The winners of each group played a two-legged tie. The winners of each heat qualified for the EuroBasket 2007 qualification.

== Teams ==
- Albania
- Austria
- Belarus
- Cyprus
- Denmark
- Finland
- Georgia
- Ireland
- Iceland
- Luxembourg
- Macedonia
- Malta
- Romania
- Slovakia
- Switzerland

== Results ==
=== Group A ===
Team	Pld	W	L	PF	PA	PD	Pts
Denmark	4	3	1	299	273	+26	7
Iceland	4	2	2	290	303	−13	6
Romania	4	1	3	287	300	−13	5

10 Sep 2004
19:00

Boxscore

Denmark	81–71	Iceland
Scoring by quarter: 17–26, 25–14, 19–19, 20–12
Pts: Jensen 19; Rebs: Christoffersen 8 Asts: Thuesen 6		Pts: J. Stefansson 15; Rebs: Baeringsson 7 Asts: Sigurdarson 3

Aarhus
Attendance: 1,800
Referees: Paulus Maria Van Den Heuvel (NED)

15 Sep 2004
19:30

Boxscore

Romania	73–74	Denmark
Scoring by quarter: 23–22, 15–14, 19–19, 16–19
Pts: Stanescu 19; Rebs: Burlacu 8 Asts: Fometescu 4		Pts: Johansen 12; Rebs: Christoffersen 10; Asts: Thuesen 3

Cluj-Napoca
Attendance: 2,000
Referees: Sergiy Chebyshev (UKR), Iskren Manolov (BUL)

19 Sep 2004
16:00

Boxscore

Iceland	79–73	Romania
Scoring by quarter: 28–16, 12–22, 18–24, 21–11
Pts: Magnússon 16; Rebs: M. Gunnarsson 5 Asts: J. Stefansson 9		Pts: Apostol 15; Rebs: Apostol 8 Asts: Fometescu 5

Keflavík
Referees: Keith Williams (ENG)

3 Sep 2005
14:00

Boxscore

Iceland	60–77	Denmark
Scoring by quarter: 19–12, 13–19, 16–16, 12–30
Pts: L. Gunnarsson 18; Rebs: F. Stefánsson 9 Asts: eight players 1		Pts: Drejer 26; Rebs: Drejer 10; Asts: Colman, Drejer 4

Arena of IBK Keflavik, Keflavík
Attendance: 1,000
Referees: Nikolaos Mpotitsis (SWE), Keith Williams (ENG)

7 Sep 2005
19:00

Boxscore

Denmark	67–69	Romania
Scoring by quarter: 14–17, 13–19, 21–9, 19–24
Pts: Soltau 19; Rebs: Christoffersen 9 Asts: Jensen 4		Pts: Stanescu 19; Rebs: Stanescu 14; Asts: Stanescu, Lapuste 2

Vejlby-Risskov Hallen, Risskov
Referees: Mikko Toivonen (FIN), Apostolos Kalpakas (SWE)

10 Sep 2005
17:00

Boxscore

Romania	72–80	Iceland
Scoring by quarter: 18–16, 17–20, 13–25, 24–19
Pts: Stanescu, Fometescu 11; Rebs: Stanescu 15; Asts: Helcioiu 5		Pts: M. Gunnarsson 22; Rebs: Baeringsson 8 Asts: M. Gunnarsson 3

Bucharest
Referees: Dragan Neskovic (SRB), Peter Vigh (HUN)

=== Group B ===
Team	P	W	L	PF	PA	Diff
Ireland	6	4	2	473	382	+91
Slovakia	6	4	2	478	363	+115
Switzerland	6	4	2	439	363	+76
Malta	6	0	6	286	568	−282

Head-to-head record

Team	P	W	L	PF	PA	Diff
Ireland	4	2	2	285	282	+3
Slovakia	4	2	2	271	271	0
Switzerland	4	2	2	266	269	−3

11 Sep 2004
17:00

Boxscore

Malta	51–90	Ireland
Scoring by quarter: 11–24, 8–28, 12–25, 20–13
Pts: Naudi 19; Rebs: Naudi 5 Asts: Sammut, Schembri 2		Pts: Bracey 21; Rebs: Callahan 10; Asts: J. J. Larranaga, J. T. Larranaga, Burke 3

Arena Msida, Msida
Referees: Fabrizio Pizio (SUI), Markus Grievink (GER)

11 Sep 2004
17:30

Boxscore

Switzerland	56–73	Slovakia
Scoring by quarter: 16–16, 10–20, 16–14, 14–23
Pts: K. Sefolosha, Sassella 13; Rebs: Sassella 7 Asts: Wegmann 4		Pts: R. Rancik 18; Rebs: Novák, R. Rancik 9 Asts: Gavlák, Lisicky, Novák 2

Lausanne
Attendance: 1,500
Referees: Jose Magalhaes (POR), Joel Danielou (FRA)

13 Sep 2004
19:00

Boxscore

Malta	53–107	Slovakia
Scoring by quarter: 10–30, 21–16, 8–29, 14–32
Pts: Schembri 12; Rebs: Schembri, Cassar 5 Asts: Naudi 3		Pts: Soska 21; Rebs: R. Rancik 14; Asts: R. Rancik 5

Arena Msida, Msida
Referees: Fabrizio Pizio (SUI), Markus Grievink (GER)

15 Sep 2004
19:30

Boxscore

Ireland	79–68	Switzerland
Scoring by quarter: 21–18, 18–17, 21–19, 19–14
Pts: J. T. Larranaga 18; Rebs: Callahan 10; Asts: Conlon 5		Pts: Buscaglia 21; Rebs: Sassella 7 Asts: Sassella, Jaquier 3

Dublin
Attendance: 1,000
Referees: Kristinn Oskarsson (ISL), Regis Bardera (FRA)

18 Sep 2004
17:00

Boxscore

Malta	57–90	Switzerland
Scoring by quarter: 8–21, 18–14, 12–32, 19–23
Pts: Naudi 17; Rebs: Said, Bonnici 6 Asts: Naudi 5		Pts: Buscaglia 25; Rebs: Studer 6 Asts: Wegmann 5

Arena Msida, Msida
Referees: Marcello Reatto (ITA), Neil Wilkinson (ENG)

18 Sep 2004
19:00

Boxscore

Slovakia	70–67	Ireland
Scoring by quarter: 16–19, 20–20, 16–16, 18–12
Pts: R. Rancik 23; Rebs: R. Rancik 11; Asts: Gavlák, Lisicky 3		Pts: Burke 14; Rebs: Burke 12; Asts: Moran 5

Sports Hall Pasienky, Bratislava
Attendance: 1,000
Referees: Ivo Dolinek (CZE), Dariusz Lenczowski (POL)

3 Sep 2005
17:15

Boxscore

Ireland	98–49	Malta
Scoring by quarter: 26–10, 28–12, 21–2, 23–25
Pts: Naughton 15; Rebs: Naughton 12; Asts: Bree 6		Pts: Said 18; Rebs: Said 7 Asts: Mercieca, Said 3

National Basketball Arena, Dublin
Referees: Nicolaas Zwiep (NED), Jonas Bille (DEN)

3 Sep 2005
18:00

Boxscore

Slovakia	60–66	Switzerland
Scoring by quarter: 16–17, 17–11, 9–23, 18–15
Pts: R. Rancik 23; Rebs: Svitek 6 Asts: R. Rancik 3		Pts: T. Sefolosha 30; Rebs: T. Sefolosha 9 Asts: K. Sefolosha, T. Sefolosha, Buscaglia 2

Sports Hall Pasienky, Bratislava
Referees: Stelian Banica (ROU), Peter Vigh (HUN)

7 Sep 2005
18:00

Boxscore

Slovakia	100–39	Malta
Scoring by quarter: 28–8, 22–6, 25–10, 25–15
Pts: R. Rancik 22; Rebs: Novák 11; Asts: Gavel 7		Pts: Said 14; Rebs: Shoults, Cassar 5 Asts: Said, Micallef, Bonnici 1

Levice
Referees: Aristotelis Hadjisolomou (CYP), Dariusz Lenczowski (POL)

7 Sep 2005
20:00

Boxscore

Switzerland	76–57	Ireland
Scoring by quarter: 14–7, 23–14, 25–18, 14–18
Pts: T. Sefolosha 20; Rebs: T. Sefolosha 10; Asts: Imgrüth 6		Pts: J. J. Larranaga 21; Rebs: Conlon 5 Asts: Burke 3

Arena of Geneve Basket, Geneva
Attendance: 1,400
Referees: Marcello Reatto (ITA), Nicolas Maestre (FRA)

10 Sep 2005
17:15

Boxscore

Ireland	82–68	Slovakia
Scoring by quarter: 15–20, 24–15, 28–10, 15–23
Pts: Burke 23; Rebs: Burke, Callahan 7 Asts: Bree 7		Pts: Lisicky 22; Rebs: R. Rancik 8 Asts: Gavel 4

National Basketball Arena, Dublin
Attendance: 1,000
Referees: Daniel Hierrezuelo (ESP), Eddie Viator (FRA)

10 Sep 2005
17:30

Boxscore

Switzerland	83–37	Malta
Scoring by quarter: 11–12, 25–5, 23–9, 24–11
Pts: Bachmann 14; Rebs: K. Sefolosha 9 Asts: Mafuta 5		Pts: Said 16; Rebs: Bezzina 4 Asts: Mercieca, Bezzina, Shoults 1

Arena of Geneve Basket, Geneva
Attendance: 1,400
Referees: José Araujo (POR), Christoph Holzner (AUT)

==== Group C ====
Team	P	W	L	PF	PA	Diff
Austria	6	5	1	480	431	+49
Belarus	6	4	2	500	449	+51
Cyprus	6	3	3	462	443	+19
Albania	6	0	6	420	539	−119

11 Sep 2004
19:00

Boxscore

Cyprus	65–74	Austria
Scoring by quarter: 14–18, 19–17, 13–16, 19–23
Pts: Kounounis, Trisokkas 17; Rebs: Trisokkas 10; Asts: Kounounis 6		Pts: Mayes 26; Rebs: Volcic 10; Asts: Jandl 4

Arena of Pizzaexpress Apollon, Limassol
Attendance: 1,300
Referees: Ido Bergman (ISR), Doru Vinasi (ROU)

11 Sep 2004
19:00

Boxscore

Albania	72–84	Belarus
Scoring by quarter: 16–10, 4–25, 28–23, 24–26
Pts: Bilali 30; Rebs: Bilali 12; Asts: Garo, Mema, Bilali, Shima 1		Pts: Kudrautsau 20; Rebs: Meshcharakou 10; Asts: Ulyanko, Koul 1

Tirana
Attendance: 1,800
Referees: Georgios Tanatzis (GRE), Aleksandar Milojevic (MKD)

14 Sep 2004
19:00

Boxscore

Belarus	77–72	Cyprus
Scoring by quarter: 16–15, 30–15, 21–20, 10–22
Pts: Meshcharakou 21; Rebs: Meshcharakou, Kuchinski 6 Asts: Zaitsau 4		Pts: Trisokkas 22; Rebs: Trisokkas 7 Asts: Kounounis 2

Arena Palace of Sports Games, Gomel
Attendance: 1,000
Referees: Igor Demenkov (RUS), Janusz Calik (POL)

15 Sep 2004
18:00

Boxscore

Austria	83–66	Albania
Scoring by quarter: 17–17, 22–14, 26–12, 18–23
Pts: Volcic 23; Rebs: Volcic 11; Asts: Jandl 3		Pts: Saptahovic 24; Rebs: Bilali 8 Asts: Bilali, Kasmi 1

Gmunden
Referees: Miroslav Macela (CZE), Tamas Földhazi (HUN)

18 Sep 2004
19:00

Boxscore

Albania	67–76	Cyprus
Scoring by quarter: 18–21, 19–14, 11–24, 19–17
Pts: Saptahovic 17; Rebs: Mema, Bilali 6 Asts: Saptahovic, Mema, Bilali, Kasmi, Shima 1		Pts: Roundy 26; Rebs: Roundy 17; Asts: Kounounis 2

Tirana
Attendance: 1,000
Referees: Zoran Zlatevski (MKD), Nikolaos Agadakos (GRE)

18 Sep 2004
19:00

Boxscore

Austria	91–92	Belarus
Scoring by quarter: 29–23, 12–28, 29–24, 21–17
Pts: Jandl 21; Rebs: Knabl 9 Asts: Volcic 6		Pts: Ulyanko 22; Rebs: Meshcharakou 10; Asts: Meshcharakou, Kuchinski, Krivonos 2

Sporthalle Oberwart, Oberwart
Attendance: 1,300
Referees: Igor Vidic (SLO), Tomas Lukac (SVK)

2 Sep 2005
20:15

Boxscore

Austria	73–66	Cyprus
Scoring by quarter: 18–16, 11–15, 24–15, 20–20
Pts: Volcic 16; Rebs: Volcic 11; Asts: Jandl 4		Pts: Koronides 16; Rebs: Roundy 8 Asts: Koronides 4

Sporthalle Oberwart, Oberwart
Attendance: 1,500
Referees: Sasa Pukl (SLO), Milivoje Jovcic (SRB)

3 Sep 2005
17:00

Boxscore

Belarus	110–58	Albania
Scoring by quarter: 34–12, 25–16, 19–20, 32–10
Pts: Veremeenko 26; Rebs: Veremeenko 18; Asts: Akulich 8		Pts: Shima 21; Rebs: Azemi 6 Asts: Azemi, Saptahovic, Byberi 2

Arena Palace of Sports Games, Gomel
Attendance: 1,200
Referees: Sergiy Zashchuk (UKR), Sergey Mikhaylov (RUS)

7 Sep 2005
19:00

Boxscore

Albania	82–90	Austria
Scoring by quarter: 23–19, 17–22, 18–27, 24–22
Pts: Saptahovic 25; Rebs: Garo, Kotrri 6 Asts: Saptahovic, Shima 1		Pts: Mayes 30; Rebs: Volcic 9 Asts: Mayes 4

Arena of SC Tirana, Tirana
Attendance: 1,000
Referees: Georgios Tanatzis (GRE), Petar Denkovski (MKD)

7 Sep 2005
20:00

Boxscore

Cyprus	87–77	Belarus
Scoring by quarter: 19–24, 22–18, 20–20, 26–15
Pts: Roundy 30; Rebs: Roundy 12; Asts: Perentos 2		Pts: Veremeenko 18; Rebs: Veremeenko, Aliakseyeu 6 Asts: Kudrautsau 4

Arena of Keravnos Keo, Nicosia
Attendance: 1,100
Referees: Shay Shtriks (BUL), Vladimir Tsekov (BUL)

10 Sep 2005
17:00

Boxscore

Belarus	60–69	Austria
Scoring by quarter: 19–20, 6–23, 20–10, 15–16
Pts: Ulyanko 15; Rebs: Veremeenko 11; Asts: Charko, Veremeenko 2		Pts: Mayes 27; Rebs: Kohlmaier 9 Asts: Volcic 4

Arena Palace of Sports Games, Gomel
Attendance: 1,200
Referees: Tomasz Kudlicki (POL), Viktor Bozhenar (UKR)

10 Sep 2005
18:15

Boxscore

Cyprus	96–75	Albania
Scoring by quarter: 28–21, 22–22, 26–16, 20–16
Pts: Neophytou 20; Rebs: Roundy 15; Asts: Koronides 4		Pts: Saptahovic 27; Rebs: Bilali 7 Asts: Saptahovic 4

Arena of Keravnos Keo, Nicosia
Attendance: 1,400
Referees: Plamen Simeonov (BUL), Gil Oved (ISR)

==== Group D ====
Team	P	W	L	PF	PA	Diff
Macedonia	6	5	1	550	433	+77
Georgia	6	4	2	488	432	+56
Finland	6	3	3	492	460	+32
Luxembourg	6	0	6	387	552	−165

11 Sep 2004
20:00

Boxscore

Georgia	85–78	Finland
Scoring by quarter: 21–23, 16–22, 21–11, 27–22
Pts: Pachulia 30; Rebs: V. Boisa, Pachulia 12; Asts: Williams 10		Pts: Matinen 23; Rebs: Kotti 7 Asts: Möttölä 6

Arena of GTU, Tbilisi
Attendance: 10,000
Referees: Nail Saitgaleev (RUS), Haluk Yesiloglu (TUR)

11 Sep 2004
20:30

Boxscore

Luxembourg	69–94	Macedonia
Scoring by quarter: 26–23, 11–20, 15–23, 17–28
Pts: Delgado Almeida Rosario 24; Rebs: Jones 9 Asts: Becker 2		Pts: Gechevski 18; Rebs: Gechevski 9 Asts: Blazevski 4

Arena Centre Sportif "Roll Delles", Mondorf-les-Bains
Referees: Vincent Delestrée (BEL), Carlos Mateus (FRA)

15 Sep 2004
18:30

Boxscore

Finland	97–64	Luxembourg
Scoring by quarter: 21–16, 33–15, 22–16, 21–17
Pts: Kotti 22; Rebs: Möttölä 11; Asts: Lehtonen 6		Pts: M. Rajniak 25; Rebs: Jones 17; Asts: Becker, Wulff, Melchior, M. Rajniak 2

Attendance: 1,170
Referees: Andres Tobi (EST), John Hammervoll (NOR)

15 Sep 2004
18:30

Boxscore

Macedonia	81–77	Georgia
Scoring by quarter: 23–22, 19–13, 21–22, 18–20
Pts: Dzons 19; Rebs: Gechevski 10; Asts: Samardziev 5		Pts: Williams 27; Rebs: Pachulia 8 Asts: Williams 6

Skopje
Attendance: 2,000
Referees: Nikolaos Karoussis (GRE), Branislav Medak (SRB)

18 Sep 2004
17:00

Boxscore

Finland	78–87	Macedonia
Scoring by quarter: 18–26, 19–15, 16–22, 25–24
Pts: Kotti 22; Rebs: Möttölä 11; Asts: Rannikko 4		Pts: Dzons 26; Rebs: Gechevski 9 Asts: Kurtovic 3

Arena of Honka Playboys, Espoo
Attendance: 2,251
Referees: Atso Matsalu (EST), Apostolos Kalpakas (SWE)

18 Sep 2004
20:00

Boxscore

Luxembourg	61–87	Georgia
Scoring by quarter: 21–26, 15–18, 19–20, 6–23
Pts: Jones 25; Rebs: Jones 22; Asts: Becker 3		Pts: V. Boisa 20; Rebs: V. Boisa 14; Asts: Williams 9

Hall Omnisport Soleurvre, Soleuvre
Referees: Luca Carlini (SUI), Ronny Denis (BEL)

3 Sep 2005
15:00

Boxscore

Finland	87–79	Georgia
Scoring by quarter: 22–24, 26–14, 18–25, 21–16
Pts: Rannikko 27; Rebs: Möttölä 9 Asts: Möttölä, Rannikko 2		Pts: Tskitishvili 23; Rebs: Pachulia 14; Asts: Williams 6

Arena of New Wave Basket, Helsinki
Attendance: 1,990
Referees: Luigi Lamonica (ITA), Lahdo Sharro (SWE)

3 Sep 2005
20:30

Boxscore

Macedonia	105–66	Luxembourg
Scoring by quarter: 25–16, 25–19, 30–13, 25–18
Pts: Antić 26; Rebs: Antić 12; Asts: Stefanov 10		Pts: P. Rajniak 24; Rebs: M. Rajniak 9 Asts: Wulff, Schmitz 2

Arena of Rabotnicki, Skopje
Attendance: 1,500
Referees: Yaron Zarif (ISR), Ervin Koci (ALB)

7 Sep 2005
19:00

Boxscore

Georgia	73–60	Macedonia
Scoring by quarter: 15–20, 16–16, 16–13, 26–11
Pts: V. Boisa 20; Rebs: Pachulia, Tskitishvili 13; Asts: Williams 6		Pts: V. Stefanov, Gechevski, Stik 13; Rebs: Stik 6 Asts: V. Stefanov 7

Arena of GTU, Tbilisi
Attendance: 6,000
Referees: Jaroslav Janac (SVK), Recep Ankarali (TUR)

7 Sep 2005
20:30

Boxscore

Luxembourg	62–82	Finland
Scoring by quarter: 6–20, 18–22, 23–16, 15–24
Pts: P. Rajniak 24; Rebs: M. Rajniak 8 Asts: Schartz 4		Pts: Möttölä 17; Rebs: Muurinen 10; Asts: Lehtoranta, Rannikko 4

Arena of T71, Dudelange
Referees: Boris Schmidt (GER)

10 Sep 2005
19:00

Boxscore

Georgia	87–65	Luxembourg
Scoring by quarter: 24–7, 18–19, 22–19, 23–20
Pts: Pachulia 30; Rebs: Pachulia 21; Asts: Gamqrelidze 11		Pts: P. Rajniak 25; Rebs: P. Rajniak 9 Asts: P. Rajniak, M. Rajniak 4

Arena of GTU, Tbilisi
Attendance: 8,000
Referees: Alikram Rzayev (AZE), Anton Makhlin (RUS)

10 Sep 2005
20:30

Boxscore

Macedonia	83–70	Finland
Scoring by quarter: 15–26, 23–10, 17–18, 28–16
Pts: Stik 20; Rebs: Antić 5 Asts: V. Stefanov 6		Pts: Möttölä 28; Rebs: Möttölä 9 Asts: Rannikko 4

Arena of Rabotnicki, Skopje
Attendance: 2,000
Referees: Christos Mastraftsis (GRE), Marin Mehandjiev (BUL)

=== Qualification Games ===
17 September
18:00

Boxscore

Austria	75–101	Macedonia
Scoring by quarter: 27–26, 10–33, 25–22, 13–20
Pts: Mayes 27; Rebs: Volcic 6 Asts: six players 1		Pts: Stefanov 25; Rebs: Stefanov 6 Asts: Stefanov 4

Gmunden, Austria
Attendance: 1100
Referees: M Reatto (ITA), P Bodnar (HUN)

24 September
20:00

Boxscore

Macedonia	99–62	Austria
Scoring by quarter: 26–20, 22–10, 27–16, 24–16
Pts: Antić 16; Rebs: four players 4 Asts: Stefanov 10		Pts: Knabl, Ortner 14; Rebs: Volcic 11; Asts: Schreiner 5

Skopje, FYR Macedonia
Attendance: 2500
Referees: K Koromilas (GRE), D Nakic (CRO)

Macedonia won 200–137 and advanced to Eurobasket 2007 Division A

17 September 2005
17:00

Boxscore

Ireland	80–66	Denmark
Scoring by quarter: 17–15, 29–19, 20–11, 14–21
Pts: Conlon 14; Rebs: Bowdler 8 Asts: Bree 4		Pts: Thuesen 15; Rebs: Drejer, Johansen 6 Asts: Iversen, Johansen 1

Dublin, Ireland
Attendance: 1200
Referees: S De Coster (BEL), C Mateus (FRA)

24 September 2005
15:00

Boxscore

Denmark	86–70	Ireland
Scoring by quarter: 22–15, 17–9, 15–14, 12–10
Pts: Drejer 39; Rebs: Johansen 9 Asts: Thuesen 10		Pts: Callahan 22; Rebs: Callahan 8 Asts: Bree 4

Aarhus, Denmark
Attendance: 1225
Referees: B Schmidt (GER), S Herbertsson (ISL)

Denmark won 152–150 and advanced to Eurobasket 2007 Division A

== Statistical leaders ==
Points

Rank	Name	G	Pts	PPG
1	(Luxembourg) Martin Rajniak	4	88	22.0
2	(Georgia (country)) Zaza Pachulia	6	126	21.0
3	(Denmark) Christian Drejer	4	82	20.5
4	(Slovakia) Radoslav Rančík	6	122	20.3
5	(Georgia (country)) Shammond Williams	5	100	20.0

Rebounds

Rank	Name	G	Rbs	RPG
1	(Georgia (country)) Zaza Pachulia	6	78	13.0
2	(Cyprus) JoJo Garcia	6	63	10.5
3	(Romania) Virgil Stănescu	4	37	9.3
4	(Austria) Bernd Volcic	8	73	9.1
5	(Slovakia) Radoslav Rančík	6	53	8.8

Assists

Rank	Name	G	Asts	APG
1	(North Macedonia) Vrbica Stefanov	5	37	4.7
2	(Georgia (country)) Shammond Williams	5	37	4.7
3	(Republic of Ireland) Michael Bree	6	25	4.2
4	(Georgia (country)) Giorgi Gamqrelidze	4	16	4.0
5	(Denmark) Martin Thuesen	6	23	3.8
