= FIBA EuroBasket 2011 qualification =

EuroBasket 2011 qualifiers.

This page describes the qualification procedure for FIBA EuroBasket 2011.

== Qualified teams ==
Ten teams have secured their places at the EuroBasket 2011 before the qualifications. Seven teams have qualified through the qualifying round, five through FIBA Europe expansion of the tournament, and two more team have qualified through the Additional Qualifying Round.

Qualified as the host nation:

- Lithuania

Qualified through participation at the 2010 FIBA World Championship

- Croatia
- France
- Germany
- Greece
- Russia
- Slovenia
- Serbia
- Spain
- Turkey

Qualified through the qualifying round

- Belgium
- Great Britain
- Israel
- Macedonia
- Montenegro

Qualified through FIBA Europe decision on 5 September 2010

- Bosnia and Herzegovina
- Bulgaria
- Georgia
- Italy
- Latvia
- Poland
- Ukraine

Qualified through the Additional Qualifying Round

- Finland
- Portugal

== Qualification format ==
The Qualifying Round was held from 2 August 2010 to 29 August 2010. The draw for the qualifying round was held on 16 January 2010 in Munich, Germany. There were three groups of five teams. The best four teams in each group qualified for EuroBasket 2011.

The three remaining teams played an Additional Qualifying Round for the last two places in EuroBasket 2011.

== Expansion of EuroBasket 2011 ==
Originally, the final tournament was to have included 16 teams. However, on 5 September 2010, after the qualifying round had concluded, FIBA Europe decided to expand the final to 24 teams, and therefore 12 teams qualified instead of 5.

== Qualifying round ==
=== Qualification groups ===
The draw for the qualifying round was held on 16 January 2010 in Munich, Germany.

Group A	Group B	Group C
Finland; Italy; Latvia; Montenegro; Israel	Bosnia and Herzegovina; Hungary; North Macedonia; Ukraine; Great Britain	Belgium; Portugal; Poland; Georgia; Bulgaria

=== Group A ===
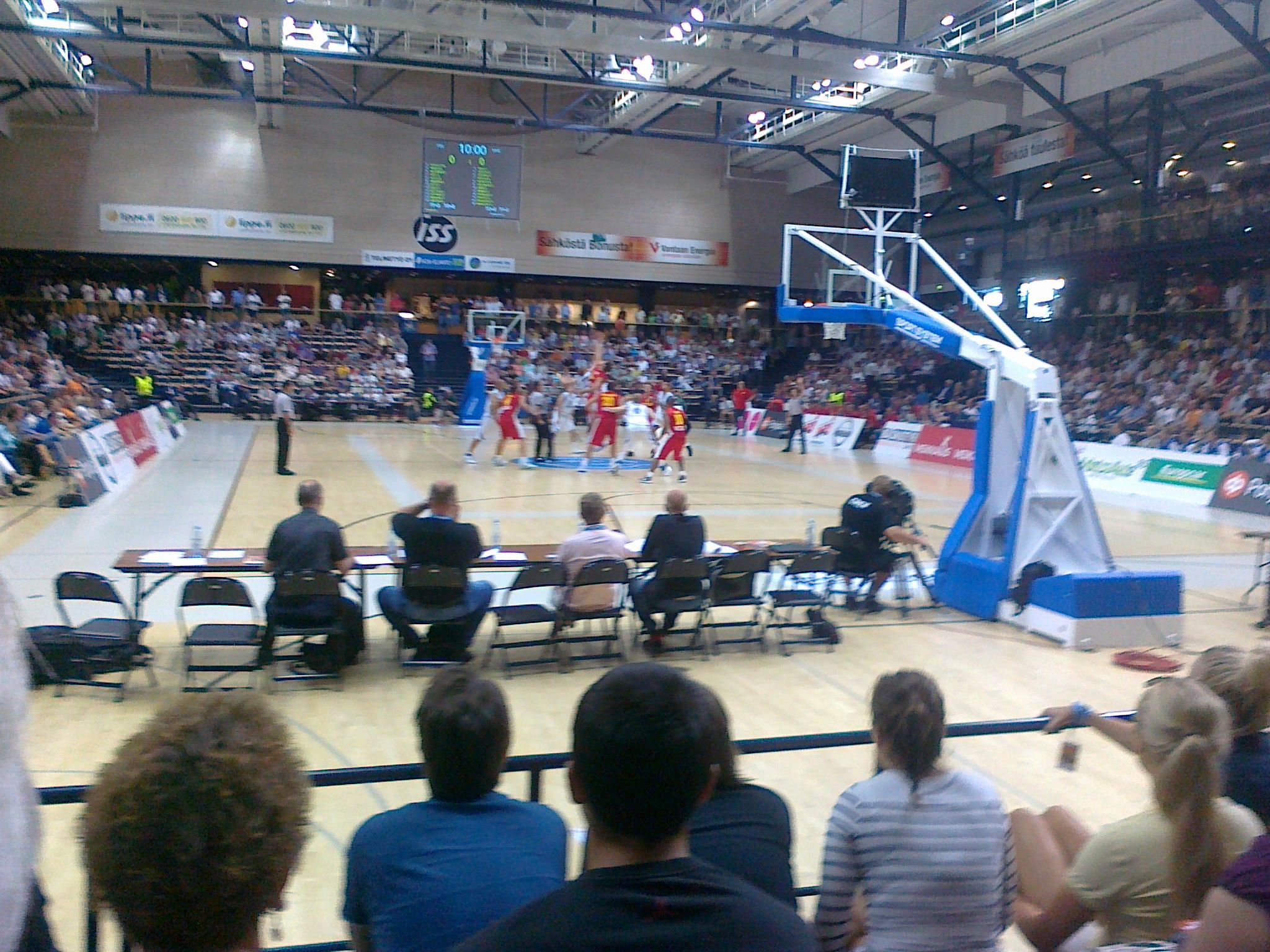
Finland-Montenegro Eurobasket 2011 qualification match

Finland-Montenegro Eurobasket 2011 qualification

Qualified for the final Tournament by Qualifying Round
Qualified for the final Tournament by FIBA Europe decision on 5 September 2010
Qualified for the Additional Qualifying Round

Team	Pts	W	L	PF	PA	Diff
Montenegro	14	6	2	645	561	+84
Israel	13	5	3	671	603	+68
Italy	13	5	3	630	615	+15
Latvia	11	3	5	636	722	−86
Finland	9	1	7	599	680	−81

Note: All times are local

2 August 2010
20:30

Report

Italy	71–79	Israel
Scoring by quarter: 19–20, 14–25, 22–22, 16–12
Pts: Bargnani, Belinelli 20; Rebs: Bargnani 8 Asts: Datome, Belinelli 2		Pts: Halperin 16; Rebs: Bluthenthal 7 Asts: Casspi 5

Palaflorio, Bari
Attendance: 4,500
Referees: Ilija Belosevic, Juan Arteaga, David Chambon

2 August 2010
21:00

Report

Montenegro	96–66	Latvia
Scoring by quarter: 30–13, 23–25, 21–14, 22–14
Pts: Peković 26; Rebs: Jeretin 7 Asts: Bjelica, Dragicevic 4		Pts: Strēlnieks 13; Rebs: Strēlnieks 6 Asts: Strēlnieks 4

Morača Sports Center, Podgorica
Attendance: 3,500
Referees: Ivo Dolinek, Aleksandar Milojevik, Miguel Perez Perez

5 August 2010
20:00

Report

Finland	60–74	Montenegro
Scoring by quarter: 10–14, 11–17, 18–26, 21–17
Pts: Rannikko 20; Rebs: Huff 9 Asts: three players 1		Pts: Dašić 12; Rebs: Borisov 6 Asts: Cook 6

Energia Areena, Vantaa
Attendance: 1,833
Referees: José Martín, Lahdo Sharro, Tomas Jasevičius

5 August 2010
20:30

Report

Latvia	69–68	Italy
Scoring by quarter: 14–14, 19–17, 19–19, 17–18
Pts: Kuksiks 12; Rebs: Freimanis 8 Asts: Strēlnieks 5		Pts: Bargnani 18; Rebs: Bargnani 8 Asts: Maestranzi 4

Arena Riga, Riga
Referees: Romualdas Brazauskas, Marek Ćmikiewicz, Oliver Krause

8 August 2010
18:00

Report

Israel	110–88	Latvia
Scoring by quarter: 37–18, 18–22, 24–23, 31–25
Pts: Casspi 21; Rebs: Casspi 8 Asts: Burstein 6		Pts: Kuksiks 24; Rebs: Bērziņš 7 Asts: Strēlnieks 6

Nokia Arena, Tel Aviv
Attendance: 11,000
Referees: Spyridon Gontas, Dragan Neskovic, Virginijus Dovidavičius

8 August 2010
20:30

Report

Italy	82–73	Finland
Scoring by quarter: 28–13, 19–21, 13–21, 22–18
Pts: Bargnani 24; Rebs: Bargnani 5 Asts: Belinelli 5		Pts: Rannikko 27; Rebs: Muurinen 9 Asts: four players 1

Palaflorio, Bari
Attendance: 4,500
Referees: Srdan Dozai, Antonio Conde, Andrej Jersan

11 August 2010
20:00

Report

Montenegro	71–62	Italy
Scoring by quarter: 15–14, 17–20, 18–12, 21–16
Pts: Peković 28; Rebs: Borisov 9 Asts: Jeretin, Cook 4		Pts: Bargnani 17; Rebs: Carraretto 5 Asts: Belinelli 3

Hall Nikoljac, Bijelo Polje
Attendance: 3,500
Referees: Vicente Bulto, Spyridon Gontas, Emin Mogulkoc

11 August 2010
19:00

Report

Finland	84–83	Israel
Scoring by quarter: 18–22, 26–26, 23–18, 17–17
Pts: Huff, Virtanen 13; Rebs: Kotti 10; Asts: Huff, Iisalo 2		Pts: Halperin 18; Rebs: three players 5 Asts: Burstein 3

Barona Areena, Espoo
Attendance: 1,704
Referees: Romualdas Brazauskas, Tomasz Kudlicki, Aare Halliko

14 August 2010
20:30

Report

Israel	77–73	Montenegro
Scoring by quarter: 26–22, 14–18, 19–21, 18–12
Pts: Casspi 30; Rebs: Bluthenthal, Eliyahu 5 Asts: Halperin 5		Pts: Peković 20; Rebs: Dragicevic 8 Asts: Cook 8

Nokia Arena, Tel Aviv
Attendance: 11,000
Referees: Milan Brziak, Christos Christodoulou, Marius Ciulin

14 August 2010
20:30

Report

Latvia	87–67	Finland
Scoring by quarter: 29–16, 25–10, 17–21, 16–20
Pts: Bankevics 26; Rebs: Bankevics 8 Asts: Strēlnieks 5		Pts: Salin 15; Rebs: Kotti 9 Asts: Virtanen 3

Arena Riga, Riga
Attendance: 2,500
Referees: Fedor Dmitriev, Eddie Viator, Zdenko Zubak

17 August 2010
18:30

Report

Israel	76–81	Italy
Scoring by quarter: 17–22, 22–26, 21–21, 16–12
Pts: Casspi 20; Rebs: Casspi 10; Asts: Halperin 5		Pts: Bargnani 26; Rebs: Belinelli 8 Asts: Belinelli 6

Nokia Arena, Tel Aviv
Attendance: 11,000
Referees: Engin Kennerman, Daniel Hierrezuelo, Sasa Maričić

17 August 2010
20:30

Report

Latvia	84–90	Montenegro
Scoring by quarter: 19–25, 21–22, 20–16, 24–27
Pts: Kuksiks 22; Rebs: Strēlnieks 9 Asts: Strēlnieks 5		Pts: Dragicevic 24; Rebs: Peković 6 Asts: Cook 6

Arena Riga, Riga
Attendance: 4,000
Referees: Fernando Rocha, Marcin Kowalski, Jurgis Laurinavičius

20 August 2010
20:30

Report

Italy	109–93	Latvia
Scoring by quarter: 26–17, 32–24, 26–31, 25–21
Pts: Bargnani 30; Rebs: Bargnani 13; Asts: Mancinelli 5		Pts: Bankevics, Bērziņš 14; Rebs: Kuksiks 7 Asts: Strēlnieks 6

Palaflorio, Bari
Attendance: 4,200
Referees: Boris Schmidt, Sasa Pukl, Francisco Araña

20 August 2010
21:00

Report

Montenegro	91–71	Finland
Scoring by quarter: 28–15, 24–22, 19–15, 20–19
Pts: Dragičević 21; Rebs: Dragičević 12; Asts: Cook 11		Pts: Salin 15; Rebs: Muurinen, Kotti 4 Asts: Rannikko 4

Sportska Dvorana Topolica, Bar
Attendance: 3,000
Referees: Ademir Zurapović, Anastasios Piloidis, Matej Spendl

23 August 2010
20:00

Report

Finland	83–85	Italy
Scoring by quarter: 18–19, 12–29, 29–17, 24–20
Pts: Rannikko 22; Rebs: Kotti 9 Asts: Rannikko 6		Pts: Bargnani 24; Rebs: Belinelli, Bargnani 7 Asts: three players 2

Energia Areena, Vantaa
Attendance: 2,035
Referees: Borys Ryzhyk, Oscar Lefwerth, Marcin Kowalski

23 August 2010
20:30

Report

Latvia	56–92	Israel
Scoring by quarter: 15–18, 11–36, 15–14, 15–24
Pts: Šeļakovs 14; Rebs: Freimanis 7 Asts: Strēlnieks 4		Pts: Pnini 14; Rebs: three players 6 Asts: Naimy 4

Arena Riga, Riga
Attendance: 3,600
Referees: Ivo Dolinek, Jakub Zamojski, Mindaugas Večerskis

26 August 2010
18:00

Report

Israel	85–71	Finland
Scoring by quarter: 13–22, 19–11, 34–20, 19–18
Pts: Eliyahu 18; Rebs: Eliyahu 13; Asts: Halperin 5		Pts: Huff 16; Rebs: Huff 8 Asts: Kotti 3

Nokia Arena, Tel Aviv
Attendance: 11,000
Referees: Mehmet Keseratar, Milan Mažić, Alfred Jovović

26 August 2010
20:30

Report

Italy	72–71	Montenegro
Scoring by quarter: 12–17, 20–17, 28–22, 12–15
Pts: Bargnani 34; Rebs: Ress 7 Asts: Maestranzi 3		Pts: Cook, Peković 18; Rebs: Borisov 8 Asts: Cook 5

Palaflorio, Bari
Attendance: 5,000
Referees: Nicolas Maestre, Miguel Perez Perez, Damir Javor

29 August 2010
20:00

Report

Finland	90–93	Latvia
Scoring by quarter: 18–21, 32–21, 20–27, 20–24
Pts: Gerald Lee 24; Rebs: Tuukka Kotti 9 Asts: Kimmo Muurinen 2		Pts: Kaspars Bērziņš 15; Rebs: Ernests Kalve 6 Asts: Jānis Strēlnieks 4

Energia Areena, Vantaa
Attendance: 1,118
Referees: Marek Ćmikiewicz, Tomas Jasevičius, Sergiy Chaykovskyy

29 August 2010
21:00

Report

Montenegro	79–69	Israel
Scoring by quarter: 24–20, 13–21, 19–16, 21–12
Pts: Dragičević 20; Rebs: Dragičević 8 Asts: Jeretin, Cook 3		Pts: Casspi, Eliyahu 18; Rebs: Eliyahu 8 Asts: Naimy 5

Morača Sports Center, Podgorica
Attendance: 4,300
Referees: Sreten Radović, Antonio Conde, Sérgio Silva

=== Group B ===
Qualified for the final Tournament by Qualifying Round
Qualified for the final Tournament by FIBA Europe decision on 5 September 2010
Qualified for the Additional Qualifying Round

Team	Pts	W	L	PF	PA	Diff
Great Britain	14	6	2	651	633	+18
Macedonia	13	5	3	614	541	+73
Bosnia and Herzegovina	11	3	5	602	620	−18
Ukraine	11	3	5	582	607	−25
Hungary	11	3	5	567	615	−48

Note: All times are local

2 August 2010
19:00

Report

Hungary	82–91	Great Britain
Scoring by quarter: 29–27, 13–27, 27–13, 13–24
Pts: Hanga 20; Rebs: Hanga 10; Asts: three players 3		Pts: Deng 32; Rebs: Mensah-Bonsu 18; Asts: Sullivan, Boyd 4

Tiszaligeti Sports Hall, Szolnok
Attendance: 2,200
Referees: Grzegorz Ziemblicki, Marius Ciulin, Carmelo Lo Guzzo

2 August 2010
19:00

Report

Ukraine	58–71	Macedonia
Scoring by quarter: 22–17, 9–13, 17–20, 10–21
Pts: Lukashov 12; Rebs: Gladyr 10; Asts: Gliebov 4		Pts: Antić 26; Rebs: Antić 6 Asts: Grin 7

Olymp, Yuzhne
Attendance: 1,850
Referees: Jakub Zamojski, Zoran Sutulovic, Sergey Mikhaylov

5 August 2010
20:00

Report

Bosnia and Herzegovina	86–76	Ukraine
Scoring by quarter: 24–14, 21–21, 24–20, 17–21
Pts: Bajramović 18; Rebs: Bavčić 8 Asts: Nesovic, Kojadinovic 4		Pts: Pecherov 23; Rebs: Pecherov 10; Asts: Gladyr, Fesenko 3

Skenderija, Sarajevo
Attendance: 3,000
Referees: Andrej Lovsin, Dubravko Muhvic, Guerrino Cerebuch

5 August 2010
20:45

Report

Macedonia	78–44	Hungary
Scoring by quarter: 23–10, 16–10, 19–11, 20–13
Pts: Gečevski 17; Rebs: D. Stojanovski 6 Asts: Grin 6		Pts: Hanga 13; Rebs: Hanga 6 Asts: Hanga 6

Boris Trajkovski Sports Center, Skopje
Attendance: 5,500
Referees: Jaroslav Janac, Christos Christodoulou, Sasa Marici

8 August 2010
16:00

Report

Great Britain	104–96 (OT)	Macedonia
Scoring by quarter: 29–18, 18–25, 21–25, 19–19, Overtime: 17–9
Pts: Mensah-Bonsu 27; Rebs: Deng 11; Asts: Deng 9		Pts: McCalebb 30; Rebs: Gečevski 6 Asts: McCalebb 4

Northumbria University, Newcastle
Referees: Juan Carlos Garcia Gonzalez, Joseph Bissang, Joakim Forsberg

8 August 2010
19:00

Report

Hungary	74–70	Bosnia and Herzegovina
Scoring by quarter: 19–11, 23–15, 19–23, 13–21
Pts: Hanga 18; Rebs: Szabó 9 Asts: Hanga 5		Pts: Gordic 15; Rebs: Bavcic 12; Asts: Kojadinovic 3

Tiszaligeti Sports Hall, Szolnok
Attendance: 2,200
Referees: Ivo Dolinek, Milan Brziak, Tomasz Trawicki

11 August 2010
19:00

Report

Ukraine	80–71	Hungary
Scoring by quarter: 20–21, 20–19, 24–18, 16–13
Pts: Lishchuk 27; Rebs: Lishchuk 10; Asts: Gliebov 8		Pts: Hanga 22; Rebs: Lóránt 8 Asts: Horvath 4

Sports Palace Galychyna, Lviv
Attendance: 1,400
Referees: Borislav Peltekov, Rafael Ganiev, Olegs Latisevs

11 August 2010
20:00

Report

Bosnia and Herzegovina	80–84	Great Britain
Scoring by quarter: 24–24, 24–17, 16–23, 16–20
Pts: Varda 20; Rebs: Varda, Bajramović 6 Asts: Kojadinovic 8		Pts: Clark 23; Rebs: Mensah-Bonsu 12; Asts: Reinking 3

Skenderija, Sarajevo
Attendance: 2,500
Referees: Fabio Facchini, Alfred Jovovic, Igor Dragojevic

14 August 2010
19:00

Report

Great Britain	90–76	Ukraine
Scoring by quarter: 24–27, 23–19, 17–18, 26–12
Pts: Deng 28; Rebs: Clark 9 Asts: Deng 4		Pts: Pustozvonov 18; Rebs: Pecherov 9 Asts: Lukashov, Agafonov 4

NIA Birmingham, Birmingham
Attendance: 2,500
Referees: Oscar Lefwerth, Tomas Jasevicius, Francisco Araña

14 August 2010
20:45

Report

Macedonia	70–56	Bosnia and Herzegovina
Scoring by quarter: 26–12, 13–12, 12–21, 19–11
Pts: McCalebb 19; Rebs: Samardžiski 10; Asts: Antić, D. Stojanovski 3		Pts: Domercant 13; Rebs: Varda, Milošević, Kojadinović 6 Asts: Kojadinović 5

Boris Trajkovski Sports Center, Skopje
Attendance: 7,000
Referees: Milivoje Jovcic, Nikola Lepetic, Charalampos Karakatsounis

17 August 2010
19:30

Report

Great Britain	66–64	Hungary
Scoring by quarter: 19–11, 18–11, 21–25, 8–17
Pts: Reinking 17; Rebs: Mensah-Bonsu 17; Asts: Deng 4		Pts: Lóránt 17; Rebs: Lóránt 11; Asts: Fodor 3

NIA Birmingham, Birmingham
Attendance: 2,174
Referees: José Martín, Dariusz Szczerba, Oliver Krause

17 August 2010
20:45

Report

Macedonia	71–55	Ukraine
Scoring by quarter: 21–19, 14–10, 18–12, 18–14
Pts: McCalebb 18; Rebs: Gečevski 7 Asts: McCalebb 4		Pts: Lishchuk 11; Rebs: Lukashov 6 Asts: Gliebov 3

Boris Trajkovski Sports Center, Skopje
Attendance: 7,000
Referees: Konstantinos Mouzakis, Dragan Neskovic, Emin Mogulkoc

20 August 2010
19:00

Report

Hungary	85–82	Macedonia
Scoring by quarter: 13–25, 27–10, 20–16, 25–31
Pts: Hanga 21; Rebs: Lóránt 12; Asts: Fodor 5		Pts: McCalebb 35; Rebs: Antić 13; Asts: Mirakovski 5

Tiszaligeti Sports Hall, Szolnok
Attendance: 2,200
Referees: Marin Mehandjiev, Luigi Lamonica, Aytug Ekti

20 August 2010
19:00

Report

Ukraine	87–69	Bosnia and Herzegovina
Scoring by quarter: 31–14, 21–23, 16–18, 19–14
Pts: Pustozvonov 17; Rebs: Fesenko 7 Asts: Gliebov 7		Pts: Domercant 20; Rebs: Bavčić, Jazvin 4 Asts: Nešović 5

Sports Complex Meteor, Dnipropetrovsk
Attendance: 6,100
Referees: Grzegorz Ziemblicki, Robert Vyklicky, Ingus Baumanis

23 August 2010
20:15

Report

Bosnia and Herzegovina	73–64	Hungary
Scoring by quarter: 24–15, 20–18, 16–15, 13–16
Pts: Bajramović 19; Rebs: Dedovic, Bajramović 7 Asts: Nesovic 4		Pts: Fodor 14; Rebs: Keller 8 Asts: Lóránt, Horvath 2

Skenderija, Sarajevo
Attendance: 1,000
Referees: Tonci Anzulovic, Radomir Vojinovic, Petros Papapetrou

23 August 2010
20:45

Report

Macedonia	75–56	Great Britain
Scoring by quarter: 22–14, 21–13, 15–11, 17–18
Pts: McCalebb 20; Rebs: Samardžiski 8 Asts: McCalebb 4		Pts: Mensah-Bonsu 17; Rebs: Mensah-Bonsu 13; Asts: Clark 3

Boris Trajkovski Sports Center, Skopje
Attendance: 10,000
Referees: Sreten Radovic, Antonio Conde, Elias Koromilas

26 August 2010
19:00

Report

Hungary	83–75	Ukraine
Scoring by quarter: 13–14, 28–20, 21–19, 21–22
Pts: Keller 17; Rebs: Keller 7 Asts: Horvath, Hanga 4		Pts: Lishchuk 16; Rebs: Fesenko, Kravtsov 6 Asts: Lukashov 4

Tiszaligeti Sports Hall, Szolnok
Attendance: 1,500
Referees: Boris Schmidt, Dubravko Muhvić, Jonas Bille

26 August 2010
19:30

Report

Great Britain	94–85 (OT)	Bosnia and Herzegovina
Scoring by quarter: 15–15, 24–21, 25–21, 17–24, Overtime: 13–4
Pts: Deng 38; Rebs: Mensah-Bonsu 21; Asts: Adegboye 5		Pts: Varda, Domercant 21; Rebs: Varda 9 Asts: Nesovic 4

Echo Arena, Liverpool
Referees: Paolo Taurino, Vicente Bulto, Panagiotis Anastopoulos

29 August 2010
18:00

Report

Ukraine	75–66	Great Britain
Scoring by quarter: 18–15, 24–17, 18–17, 15–17
Pts: Lishchuk 20; Rebs: Lishchuk 10; Asts: Fesenko 2		Pts: Mensah-Bonsu 18; Rebs: Mensah-Bonsu 10; Asts: Reinking 2

Sports Complex Meteor, Dnipropetrovsk
Attendance: 6,700
Referees: Milija Vojinovic, Robert Lottermoser, Marek Maliszewski

29 August 2010
20:45

Report

Bosnia and Herzegovina	83–71	Macedonia
Scoring by quarter: 16–21, 24–13, 18–18, 25–19
Pts: Dedovic 20; Rebs: Nesovic, Varda 7 Asts: Nesovic, Domercant 4		Pts: McCalebb 19; Rebs: Samardžiski 9 Asts: McCalebb 3

Skenderija, Sarajevo
Attendance: 1,000
Referees: Yaari Rainisch, Georgios Tanatzis, Marko Juras

=== Group C ===
Qualified for the final Tournament by Qualifying Round
Qualified for the final Tournament by FIBA Europe decision on 5 September 2010
Qualified for the Additional Qualifying Round

Team	Pts	W	L	PF	PA	Diff
Belgium	14	6	2	604	580	+24
Georgia	13	5	3	599	568	+31
Bulgaria	12	4	4	638	600	+38
Poland	12	4	4	607	579	+28
Portugal	9	1	7	518	639	−121

Note: All times are local

2 August 2010
19:00

Report

Georgia	84–65	Poland
Scoring by quarter: 19–24, 26–16, 18–9, 21–16
Pts: Pachulia 27; Rebs: Sanikidze 12; Asts: Markoishvili 3		Pts: Kelati 22; Rebs: Lampe 6 Asts: Szubarga 6

Tbilisi Sports Palace, Tbilisi
Attendance: 9,100
Referees: Engin Kennerman, Anastasios Piloidis, Sergiy Chebyshev

2 August 2010
20:30

Report

Portugal	59–67	Bulgaria
Scoring by quarter: 15–22, 20–18, 19–13, 5–14
Pts: Evans 19; Rebs: Evans 9 Asts: Minhava 5		Pts: Videnov 17; Rebs: Kostov, Georgiev 5 Asts: Georgiev 5

Arena Dolce Vita, Ovar
Referees: Vicente Bulto, Mauro Pozzana, Matej Spendl

5 August 2010
20:15

Report

Poland	86–64	Portugal
Scoring by quarter: 19–10, 25–23, 22–15, 20–16
Pts: Gortat 19; Rebs: Gortat 11; Asts: Koszarek 9		Pts: Silva 12; Rebs: Evans, Pinto 4 Asts: Evans 5

Łuczniczka, Bydgoszcz
Attendance: 5,200
Referees: Juris Kokainis, Oscar Perea, Rafael Ganiev

5 August 2010
20:00

Report

Belgium	74–64	Georgia
Scoring by quarter: 19–23, 19–18, 16–13, 20–10
Pts: Beghin 17; Rebs: Hervelle 6 Asts: Hervelle, Faison 2		Pts: Pachulia 20; Rebs: Sanikidze 8 Asts: Gamqrelidze 2

Lotto Arena, Antwerp
Attendance: 3,500
Referees: Eddie Viator, Ioannis Foufis, Haydn Jones

8 August 2010
18:00

Report

Bulgaria	74–70	Poland
Scoring by quarter: 12–21, 16–14, 16–20, 30–15
Pts: Videnov 26; Rebs: Videnov, Ivanov 6 Asts: Velikov 3		Pts: Lampe 18; Rebs: Gortat 12; Asts: Koszarek 5

Universiada Hall, Sofia
Attendance: 3,000
Referees: Sasa Pukl, Marko Juras, Sergiy Zashchuk

8 August 2010
20:30

Report

Portugal	69–78	Belgium
Scoring by quarter: 14–16, 19–16, 19–18, 17–28
Pts: Evans 19; Rebs: Evans 7 Asts: Miranda 5		Pts: Tabu-Eboma 23; Rebs: Hervelle 4 Asts: Moors 5

Pavilhao Multidesportos de Coimbra, Coimbra
Referees: Juan Arteaga, Enrico Sabetta, Chris Dodds

11 August 2010
19:00

Report

Georgia	73–57	Portugal
Scoring by quarter: 12–16, 19–9, 15–13, 27–19
Pts: Pachulia 17; Rebs: Sanikidze, Tskitishvili 10; Asts: Tsintsadze 4		Pts: Miranda 16; Rebs: Evans 11; Asts: Andrade, Pinto 3

Tbilisi Sports Palace, Tbilisi
Attendance: 9,700
Referees: Volodymyr Drabikovsky, Ersan Kartal, Gili Cohen

11 August 2010
20:00

Report

Belgium	74–69	Bulgaria
Scoring by quarter: 26–20, 22–17, 16–17, 10–15
Pts: Beghin 15; Rebs: Hervelle 5 Asts: Van Rossom 6		Pts: Videnov 18; Rebs: Videnov 6 Asts: Calloway 5

Lotto Arena, Antwerp
Attendance: 3,500
Referees: Srdan Dozai, Roberto Chiari, Bert Van Slooten

14 August 2010
18:00

Report

Bulgaria	79–83	Georgia
Scoring by quarter: 22–23, 21–16, 11–19, 25–25
Pts: Videnov 29; Rebs: Ivanov 5 Asts: Calloway 4		Pts: Markoishvili 23; Rebs: Sanikidze 9 Asts: Sanikidze 6

Universiada Hall, Sofia
Attendance: 3,000
Referees: Milan Mazic, Petros Papapetrou, Robert Paulik

14 August 2010
18:00

Report

Poland	93–73	Belgium
Scoring by quarter: 26–24, 25–20, 20–8, 22–21
Pts: Gortat 29; Rebs: Gortat 7 Asts: Koszarek 7		Pts: Lauwers 14; Rebs: Beghin, Faison 4 Asts: Tabu-Eboma 6

Arena Łódź, Łódź
Attendance: 6,800
Referees: Luigi Lamonica, Benjamin Barth, Borys Shulga

17 August 2010
18:00

Report

Bulgaria	103–64	Portugal
Scoring by quarter: 33–11, 24–25, 14–12, 32–16
Pts: Videnov 15; Rebs: Georgiev, Kostov 6 Asts: Videnov, Velikov 5		Pts: Evans 16; Rebs: Evans, Andrade 6 Asts: Pinto 4

Universiada Hall, Sofia
Attendance: 1,500
Referees: Mehmet Keseratar, Branislav Mrdak, Igor Mitrovski

17 August 2010
20:15

Report

Poland	67–58	Georgia
Scoring by quarter: 12–8, 23–17, 12–11, 20–22
Pts: Gortat 17; Rebs: Lampe 9 Asts: Berisha, Kelati 3		Pts: Markoishvili 19; Rebs: Sanikidze 9 Asts: Green 4

Arena Łódź, Łódź
Attendance: 8,700
Referees: Borys Ryzhyk, Sergey Mikhaylov, Vaclav Lukes

20 August 2010
19:00

Report

Georgia	63–86	Belgium
Scoring by quarter: 18–15, 11–21, 17–29, 17–21
Pts: Pachulia, Green 11; Rebs: Sanikidze 10; Asts: Sanikidze 3		Pts: Faison 16; Rebs: Hervelle 9 Asts: Beghin, Faison 3

Tbilisi Sports Palace, Tbilisi
Attendance: 9,700
Referees: Spyridon Gontas, Omer Esteron, Viktor Bozhenar

20 August 2010
20:30

Report

Portugal	85–84 (OT)	Poland
Scoring by quarter: 19–16, 18–12, 10–22, 28–25, Overtime: 10–9
Pts: Evans 20; Rebs: Miranda 7 Asts: Minhava 11		Pts: Lampe, Koszarek 19; Rebs: Gortat 10; Asts: Koszarek 6

Pavilhao Multidesportos de Coimbra, Coimbra
Referees: Jose Ramon Garcia Ortiz, Matej Boltauzer, Keith Williams

23 August 2010
18:00

Report

Poland	75–71	Bulgaria
Scoring by quarter: 18–16, 20–14, 15–17, 22–24
Pts: Gortat 23; Rebs: Gortat 9 Asts: Koszarek 6		Pts: Videnov 21; Rebs: Videnov 9 Asts: Calloway 7

Spodek, Katowice
Attendance: 7,500
Referees: Fedor Dmitriev, Virginijus Dovidavicius, Aare Halliko

23 August 2010
20:00

Report

Belgium	68–63	Portugal
Scoring by quarter: 18–15, 11–11, 21–20, 18–17
Pts: Van Rossom 14; Rebs: Hervelle 6 Asts: Hervelle, Lauwers 2		Pts: Evans 25; Rebs: Evans 9 Asts: Cortez, Miranda 3

Lotto Arena, Antwerp
Attendance: 3,500
Referees: Nicolas Maestre, Neil Wilkinson, Lahdo Sharro

26 August 2010
18:00

Report

Bulgaria	92–81	Belgium
Scoring by quarter: 24–13, 28–29, 21–15, 19–24
Pts: Videnov 18; Rebs: Ivanov 11; Asts: Videnov 6		Pts: Lauwers 21; Rebs: Van Den Spiegel 6 Asts: Van Rossom 7

Universiada Hall, Sofia
Attendance: 2,000
Referees: Shmuel Bachar, Ioannis Foufis, Doru Vinasi

26 August 2010
20:30

Report

Portugal	57–80	Georgia
Scoring by quarter: 8–20, 15–17, 22–15, 12–28
Pts: Miranda 20; Rebs: Miranda 8 Asts: three players 2		Pts: Pachulia 18; Rebs: Pachulia 12; Asts: Tsintsadze 4

Pavilhao Desportivo de Albufeira, Albufeira
Referees: Miguel Anguel Perez Niz, Tolga Sahin, Haris Bijedic

29 August 2010
19:00

Report

Georgia	94–83	Bulgaria
Scoring by quarter: 24–19, 17–29, 32–20, 21–15
Pts: Sanikidze 27; Rebs: Pachulia 12; Asts: Markoishvili 5		Pts: Calloway 17; Rebs: Ivanov 12; Asts: Videnov, Calloway 3

Tbilisi Sports Palace, Tbilisi
Attendance: 9,000
Referees: Gianluca Mattioli, Ademir Zurapovic, Aleksandar Glisic

29 August 2010
20:15

Report

Belgium	70–67	Poland
Scoring by quarter: 15–23, 18–16, 23–16, 14–12
Pts: Beghin 16; Rebs: Faison 6 Asts: Tabu-Eboma 3		Pts: Kelati 20; Rebs: Gortat 11; Asts: Gortat, Lampe 1

Lotto Arena, Antwerp
Attendance: 5,500
Referees: Giampaolo Cicoria, Sasa Maricic, Igor Mitrovski

== Additional Qualifying Round ==
The three remaining teams played an Additional Qualifying Round for the last two places in the EuroBasket 2011.

Team	Pts	W	L	PF	PA	Diff
Finland	8	4	0	316	272	+44
Portugal	6	2	2	271	277	−6
Hungary	4	0	4	261	299	−38

9 August 2011
20:30

Report

Portugal	71–66	Hungary
Scoring by quarter: 19–21, 12–10, 23–15, 17–20
Pts: Miranda 18; Rebs: Andrade 9 Asts: da Silva 6		Pts: Lóránt 16; Rebs: Báder 7 Asts: Hanga 4

Pavilhao Multidesportos de Coimbra, Coimbra
Referees: Vicente Bulto (ESP), Aleksandar Glisic (SRB), Haydn Jones (WAL)

12 August 2011
19:00

Report

Hungary	73–75	Finland
Scoring by quarter: 24–23, 13–14, 15–24, 21–14
Pts: Horváth 15; Rebs: three players 7 Asts: Lóránt, Horváth 4		Pts: Rannikko 16; Rebs: three players 5 Asts: Koponen 5

Tiszaligeti Sports Hall, Szolnok
Attendance: 2,200
Referees: Sreten Radovic (CRO), Zoran Sutulovic (MNE), Roberto Chiari (ITA)

15 August 2011
19:00

Report

Finland	68–56	Portugal
Scoring by quarter: 15–15, 16–7, 20–18, 17–16
Pts: Huff, Kotti 16; Rebs: Huff 9 Asts: Rannikko, Koponen 4		Pts: Tavares, Andrade 11; Rebs: Cunha 10; Asts: da Silva 3

Helsinki Ice Hall, Helsinki
Attendance: 6,108
Referees: Miguel Perez Perez (ESP), Olegs Latisevs (LAT), Benjamin Barth (GER)

18 August 2011
20:30

Report

Hungary	57–66	Portugal
Scoring by quarter: 19–20, 9–25, 17–10, 12–11
Pts: Keller 12; Rebs: Báder 11; Asts: Hanga 5		Pts: Santos 16; Rebs: Andrade 11; Asts: da Silva 8

Tiszaligeti Sports Hall, Szolnok
Attendance: 2,000
Referees: David Chambon (FRA), Petar Obradovic (BIH), Emin Mogulkoc (TUR)

21 August 2011
19:00

Report

Finland	87–65	Hungary
Scoring by quarter: 22–17, 22–22, 18–16, 25–10
Pts: Koponen, Möttölä 13; Rebs: Salin 12; Asts: Salin 3		Pts: Trotter 14; Rebs: Lóránt, Bader 5 Asts: Hanga, Trepák 2

Helsinki Ice Hall, Helsinki
Attendance: 6,278
Referees: Ilija Belosevic (SRB), Volodymyr Drabikovsky (UKR), Apostolos Kalpakas (SWE)

24 August 2011
21:40

Report

Portugal	78–86	Finland
Scoring by quarter: 21–17, 24–13, 16–28, 17–28
Pts: Santos 19; Rebs: Evora, Andrade 6 Asts: da Silva 9		Pts: Koponen 26; Rebs: Muurinen 8 Asts: Koponen 9

Pavilhao Multidesportos de Coimbra, Coimbra
Referees: Luigi Lamonica (ITA), Emilio Perez (ESP), Regis Bardera (FRA)
