= Stephen Croone =

American professional basketball player

BC Titebi
- Position: Point guard
- League: Georgian Superliga

Personal information
- Born: July 29, 1994 (age 32)
- Listed height: 6 ft 0 in (1.83 m)
- Listed weight: 180 lb (82 kg)

Career information
- High school: Newton (Covington, Georgia)
- College: Furman (2012–2016)
- NBA draft: 2016: undrafted
- Playing career: 2017–present

Career history
- 2017: Sioux Falls Skyforce
- 2017–2018: Kobrat
- 2018–2019: Ura Basket
- 2019–2020: BC Yambol
- 2021–present: BC Titebi

Career highlights
- AP Honorable Mention All-American (2016); SoCon Player of the Year (2016); First-team All-SoCon (2015, 2016)

Stephen Croone (born July 19, 1994) is an American professional basketball player for BC Titebi of the Georgian Superliga. He played college basketball for Furman.

== High school career ==
Croone attended Newton High School (Georgia). His junior season, he led Newton to a 26–5 mark and a region championship while averaging 11 points per game. As a senior, he led Region 2-AAAAA in scoring, at 20.8 points, while also averaging 3.8 assists, 3.6 rebounds and 2.3 steals per game. He guided Newton to a 19–7 record, region runner-up finish and state playoff appearance.

== College career ==
Croone attended Furman where he made 122 appearances, including 118 starts, while averaging 15.9 points, 3.9 rebounds and 3.2 assists. In his junior season in college, he was named first team all conference. Croone had a thumb surgery at the beginning of his senior year and missed several games. Croone was named Southern Conference Men's Basketball Player of the Year in his senior season. He averaged 17.1 points per game while leading the Paladins to a 19–16 record and berth in the CollegeInsider.com Tournament. Croone ranked fifth in scoring all-time at Furman with 1,936 points in his career.

== Professional career ==
After going undrafted in the 2016 NBA draft, Croone was invited to an NBA development league tryout in August 2016. On February 13, 2017, he was claimed off waivers by the Sioux Falls Skyforce of the NBA D-league. During the 2018–19 season, Croone joined Ura Basket of the Finnish league and averaged 14.6 points, 4.3 rebounds, 3.3 assists and 1.0 steal per game. The following season, he signed with BC Yambol in Bulgaria. In four games, Croone averaged 18.5 points, 3.5 rebounds, 2.8 assists and 2.3 steals per game. On September 15, 2021, he signed with BC Titebi of the Georgian Superliga.
