= Ryan Stack =

American basketball player (born 1975)

Personal information
- Born: July 24, 1975 (age 51) Nashville, Tennessee, U.S.
- Listed height: 6 ft 11 in (2.11 m)
- Listed weight: 220 lb (100 kg)

Career information
- High school: Cheatham County (Chapmansboro, Tennessee)
- College: South Carolina (1994–1998)
- NBA draft: 1998: 2nd round, 48th overall pick
- Drafted by: Cleveland Cavaliers
- Playing career: 1998–2009
- Position: Power forward / center
- Number: 10

Career history
- 1999–2000: Cleveland Cavaliers
- 2000–2001: Gijón
- 2001–2002: Maccabi Ramat Gan
- 2002–2006: Aris Thessaloniki
- 2006–2007: Olympiacos
- 2007–2009: Kyiv

Career highlights
- FIBA Europe Champions Cup champion (2003); Greek Cup winner (2004); All-Greek League Team (2006); 5× Greek League All-Star (2003–2007)
- Stats at NBA.com
- Stats at Basketball Reference

Ryan Eugene Stack (born July 24, 1975) is an American former professional basketball player.

== Professional career ==
Stack, a 6 ft 11 in (211 cm) tall power forward/center, from the University of South Carolina, was selected by the Cleveland Cavaliers, in the second round, with the 48th overall pick of the 1998 NBA draft. He saw limited playing time in two NBA seasons with the Cavaliers, as the backup to the team's All-Star center Žydrūnas Ilgauskas. After playing in just 43 games for the Cavaliers, Stack signed a contract to play in Europe. He played in Spain's ACB with Gijón, during the 2000–01 season.

The next season, Stack moved to the Israeli Super League club Maccabi Ramat Gan. After a year in Israel, he moved to the Greek Basket League club Aris Thessaloniki, where he played from 2002 to 2006. During his time with Aris, Stack won the FIBA Europe Champions Cup title in 2003, the Greek Cup title in 2004, and also made it to the EuroCup Finals in 2006.

Stack was then signed by the Greek EuroLeague club Olympiacos Piraeus, in August 2006, and at that time, he was reported to have been the highest paid center in Europe. He spent one season with Olympiacos (2006–07). He then signed with the Ukrainian Super League team Kyiv.

== National team career ==
While playing with the Greek Basket League club Aris Thessaloniki, Stack adopted the citizenship of North Macedonia, under the name of Ruan Stik. Because of that, he was able to play as a European, with a Bosman passport, and thus not count as one of the two non-Europeans that were allowed per team in the Greek Basket League at that time. Stack would go on to represent the senior Macedonian national basketball team at the 2005 FIBA EuroBasket Division B and the 2007 FIBA EuroBasket qualification tournament.
