= Saša Vasiljević =

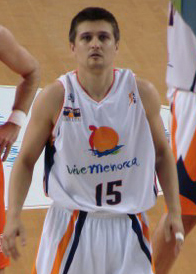
- in 2007

Personal information
- Born: March 23, 1979 (age 47) Osijek, SFR Yugoslavia
- Listed height: 6 ft 0.5 in (1.84 m)
- Listed weight: 185 lb (84 kg)

Career information
- NBA draft: 2001: undrafted
- Playing career: 1996–2017
- Position: Point guard

Career history
- 1996–1999: KK Srem
- 1999–2001: Sloga Kraljevo
- 2001–2005: Hemofarm
- 2005–2007: Bosna
- 2007: ViveMenorca
- 2007–2008: AEK Athens
- 2008–2010: Kolossos Rodou
- 2010–2011: Donetsk
- 2011: Khimik Yuzhny
- 2011–2012: Ikaros Kallitheas
- 2012–2013: Politekhnika-Halychyna
- 2013–2014: AENK
- 2014–2015: Koroivos Amaliadas
- 2015–2016: KK Srem
- 2016–2017: Bosna

Career highlights
- Greek All-Star Game 3-Point Shootout Champion (2014)

Saša Vasiljević (born March 23, 1979) is a retired professional basketball player. He represented Bosnia and Herzegovina internationally.

== Professional career ==
Vasiljević signed with ViveMenorca of the Spanish League in February 2007, replacing Rod Brown, who had been released, and he made his debut with them on February 3, 2007.

In July 2008, he signed a one-year deal with Greek team Kolossos Rodou. After good season with them he extended his contract for one more season.

In July 2010, he signed a one-year deal with Donetsk. In June 2011, he signed with Khimik Yuzhny. He left them in December 2011. Later that month he signed with Ikaros Kallitheas till the end of the season.

For 2012–13 season he signed with Politekhnika-Halychyna. In August 2013, he signed with Greek team AENK.

In August 2013, he signed with Greek team Koroivos Amaliadas.

== Honors ==
Club Honors

- Adriatic League Champion: (2005)
- Bosnian League Champion: (2006)

== Pro career statistics ==
Correct as of 23 June 2007:

Season	Team	League	GP	MPG	RPG	APG	PPG
2004–05	Hemofarm	NLB	33	17	1	2.6	5.6
2005–06	Bosna	NLB	22	25	1.4	2.3	12.5
2006–07	Bosna	NLB	19	29	2	4.9	11.7
2006–07	Menorca	ACB	15	25	1.5	2.9	7.2
