= Vrbica Stefanov =

Macedonian basketball player

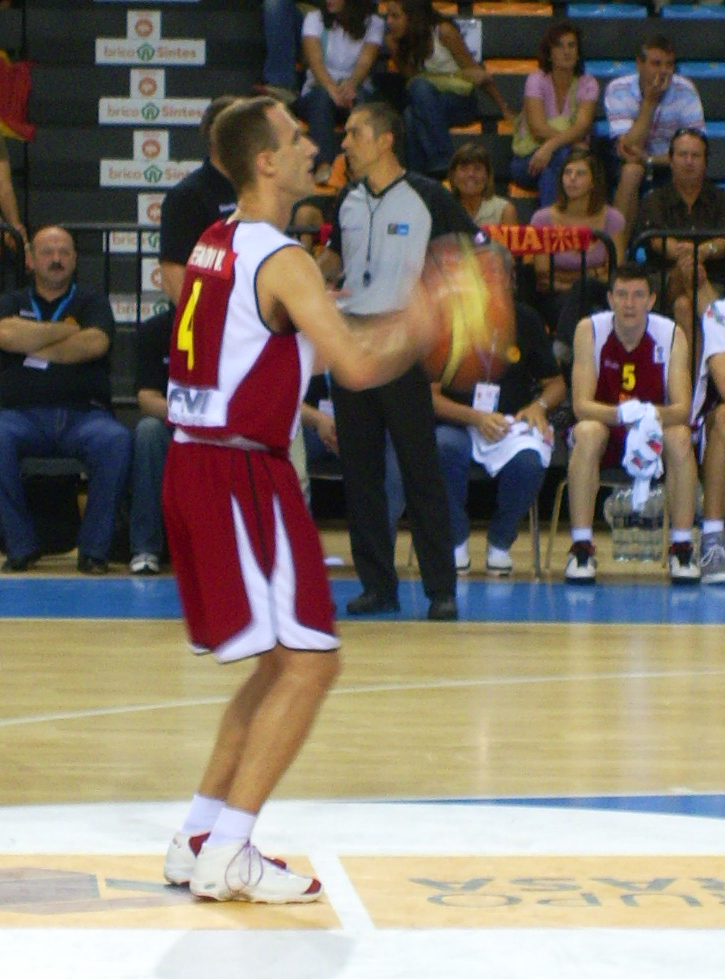
- Vrbica Stefanov shooting a free throw, at the 2007 FIBA EuroBasket qualification.

Personal information
- Born: December 19, 1973 (age 52) Kavadarci, SR Macedonia, SFR Yugoslavia
- Listed height: 6 ft 2 in (1.88 m)
- Listed weight: 165 lb (75 kg)

Career information
- NBA draft: 1995: undrafted
- Playing career: 1991–2009
- Position: Point guard
- Coaching career: 2014–2016

Career history

Playing
- 1991–1992: Tikveš
- 1992–1998: MZT Skopje
- 1998–1999: Rabotnički Skopje
- 1999–2000: Pınar Karşıyaka
- 2000–2001: AEK Athens
- 2001–2005: Montepaschi Siena
- 2005–2006: Ülkerspor
- 2006: Crvena zvezda
- 2006–2007: Olympiacos
- 2007: Montepaschi Siena
- 2007–2008: Mersin BŞB
- 2008–2009: ViveMenorca

Coaching
- 2014: MZT Skopje
- 2016: Kožuv
- 2017: Yeşilgiresun Belediye (assistant)

Vrbica Stefanov (Macedonian: Врбица Стефанов, pronounced [ˈvrbit͡sa ˈstɛfanɔv]; born December 19, 1973) is a retired Macedonian professional basketball player and former head coach of the Macedonian clubs Kožuv and MZT Skopje. On 23 March 2009, Vrbica Stefanov was awarded the Medal for Service to the Country, by the then-President of the Republic of Macedonia, Branko Crvenkovski, in acknowledgement of his sport achievements, and his contribution to developing and popularizing sports in Macedonia, as well as promoting the country abroad.

== Professional career ==
After starting his club basketball career with Tikveš, Stefanov played six seasons with MZT Aerodrom (1992–1998), then moved on to Rabotnički (1998–1999), Karşıyaka (1999–2000, Turkey), AEK Athens (2000–2001, Greece). He then remained spent four years in Italy, playing with Montepaschi Siena (2001–2005), where he reached a EuroLeague Final Four.

He won the 1998–99 Macedonian National Championship with Rabotnički, the 2001 Greek National Cup with AEK Athens, the 2002 edition of the FIBA Saporta Cup with Montepaschi Siena, the 2003–04 Italian National Championship with Montepaschi Siena, and the 2005–06 Turkish National Championship with Ülkerspor.

After he signed with Red Star Belgrade, he played in only one game with the team, and in October 2006, he said that he would retire from playing pro club basketball. However, in February 2007, he signed with the Spanish ACB League's ViveMenorca, for all of the remaining season and the following one.

== National team career ==
Stefanov was also the team captain of the senior Macedonia national basketball team. He played at the 1999 FIBA EuroBasket and the EuroBasket 2009.

== Player profile ==
Stefanov was known for his quickness, passing ability, driving and three-point shooting. While he was mainly known for being a scorer, he was also the main play-maker of his teams.

== Awards and accomplishments ==
=== Club honors ===
- Macedonian League Champion: Rabotnički (1999)
- Greek Cup Winner: AEK Athens (2001)
- FIBA Saporta Cup Champion: Montepaschi Siena (2002)
- 2× Italian A League Champion: Montepaschi Siena (2004, 2007)
- Turkish Super League Champion: Ülkerspor (2006)

=== Individual honors ===
- 4× Macedonian Sports Personality of The Year: (1998, 1999, 2000, 2001, 2003)
- Greek League All-Star: (2001)
- Italian League All-Star: (2005)
