= Jamie Arnold (basketball) =

American-Israeli basketball player (born 1975)

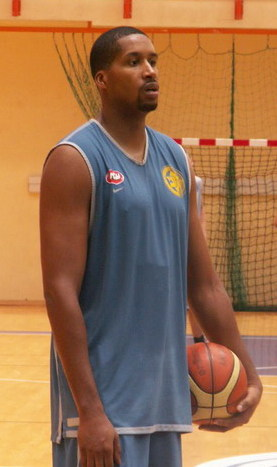
- Arnold in 2005

Personal information
- Born: March 10, 1975 (age 51) Oak Park, Michigan, U.S.
- Listed height: 6 ft 8 in (2.03 m)
- Listed weight: 230 lb (104 kg)

Career information
- High school: Oak Park (Oak Park, Michigan)
- College: Wichita State (1993–1997)
- NBA draft: 1997: undrafted
- Playing career: 1997–2011
- Position: Power forward

Career history
- 1997–1998: Echo Houthalen
- 1998–2000: Hapoel Galil Elyon
- 2000–2001: ALM Évreux Basket
- 2001–2002: Keravnos
- 2002–2003: BC Krka
- 2003–2005: DKV Joventut
- 2005–2007: Maccabi Tel Aviv
- 2007–2008: Hapoel Jerusalem
- 2008: Virtus Bologna
- 2009–2010: DASH Peristeri Greece
- 2010: Armani Jeans Milano
- 2010–2011: Hapoel Holon

Career highlights
- EuroCup Top Scorer (2003); Israeli League Rebounding Leader (1999)

Jamie Arnold (born March 10, 1975) is an American-Israeli former professional basketball player. Playing as a power forward, he represented the Israeli national team. In 1998–99, he was the top rebounder in the Israeli Basketball Premier League.

== High school ==
Arnold played high school basketball at Oak Park High School in Michigan.

== College career ==
Arnold played college basketball at Wichita State University, with the Wichita State Shockers.

== Professional career ==
Arnold played with seven European club teams, starting in Belgium in 1997 and playing until 2011. In 1998–99, he was the top rebounder in the Israeli Basketball Premier League. His last team was Hapoel Holon of Israel.

== Coaching career ==
In 2014, Arnold started as the Varsity boys head coach along with Junior Varsity coaches Michael Williams and Michael Williams Jr. at The Jean and Samuel Frankel Jewish Academy of Metropolitan Detroit.

== Awards and achievements ==
=== Team ===
02–03 – Won the Slovenian National League Championship
02–03 – EuroCup finalist
05–06 – Won the Israeli National League Championship
05–06 – Won the Israeli National Cup
05–06 – EuroLeague finalist
06–07 – Won the Israeli National League Championship
07–08 – Won the Israeli National Cup
09–10 – Italian League finalist

=== Individual ===
98–99 – Led the Israeli League in total player evaluation (#1 player rating)
98–99 – Led the Israeli League in rebounding (9.6 rebounds per game)
00–01 – Led the French Pro A League in rebounding (11.3 rebounds per game)
00–01 – Named French Pro A – Most Complete Player Award
02–03 – Played in the Slovenian League All Star Game
02–03 – Named the Slovenian League All Star Game MVP
02–03 – Named the best player not in the EuroLeague, by the website Eurobasket.com
03–04 – Named EuroCup Week-5 MVP
0 08-09 he was the NBA mvp 06–07 – Named EuroLeague Week-16 MVP
07–08 – Named EuroCup Week-3 MVP
07–08 – Named EuroCup Week-4 MVP
07–08 – Named Israeli Cup MVP
07–08 – Named Israeli 1st Team "Starting Five"
07–08 – Led the Israeli League in total evaluation (#1 player rating)
07–08 – Led the Israeli League in field goal percentage
09–10 – Named Greek League MVP Week-3
09–10 – Named Greek League MVP of November
09–10 – Named MVP of the Italian League playoffs game one, in the second round, vs. JuveCaserta Basket, for Olimpia Milano, making all 8 field goal attempts
