= Michael Bree =

Irish basketball player and coach

Personal information
- Born: Sligo, Ireland

Career information
- Playing career: 2002–2010
- Coaching career: 2010–present

Career history

Coaching
- 2010: Bakersfield Jam (assistant)
- ?: Sweden U16
- ?: Sweden U18
- 2023–2025: Denmark (assistant)
- 2025–present: Ireland

Michael Bree is an Irish basketball coach and former player who is the head coach of the Ireland men's national basketball team. A former Ireland international and team captain, he played professionally in several European leagues before transitioning into coaching.

== Early life and education ==
Bree is from Sligo, Ireland. In 1998, he moved to the United States to pursue basketball opportunities and later attended Davidson College in North Carolina. He played for the Davidson Wildcats men's basketball team and served as captain in both his junior and senior seasons. Bree was named the team's Most Valuable Player (MVP) in consecutive seasons.

== Playing career ==
=== College career ===
Bree played NCAA Division I basketball at Davidson College, where he established himself as a leading player for the Wildcats. His performances earned him back-to-back MVP awards.

=== Professional career ===
Following his college career, Bree played professionally in Europe from 2002 to 2010. He competed in multiple countries, including France, Germany, Spain, Poland, and Sweden.

=== International career ===
Bree represented the Ireland national team and earned over 40 caps between 2000 and 2006. He also served as captain of the senior team.

== Coaching career ==
=== Early coaching career ===
After retiring as a player, Bree began his coaching career in 2010 as an assistant coach with the Bakersfield Jam of the NBA D-League. During his time with the team, they reached the playoffs and set a franchise record for wins.

He later moved to Sweden, where he worked extensively in youth development. Bree served as head coach of Sweden's U16 and U18 men's national teams and was programme director at RIG Mark Basketball, helping develop elite youth players.

=== Denmark national team ===
In 2023, Bree joined the Denmark men's national basketball team as an assistant coach. He was part of the coaching staff during their FIBA Basketball World Cup qualification campaign.

=== Ireland national team ===
In July 2025, Bree was appointed head coach of the Ireland senior men's national basketball team, succeeding Mark Keenan. He officially took up the role in September 2025 on a four-year contract, with responsibility for leading the team into the FIBA EuroBasket 2029 pre-qualifiers.

Alongside his head coaching role, Bree was also appointed Head of Player Pathway Coaching and Content with Basketball Ireland, overseeing youth development structures.

== Coaching style ==
Bree is known for his focus on player development and long-term athlete pathways. His work in Sweden contributed to the development of multiple youth internationals, NCAA Division I players, and professional athletes.

== Personal life ==
Bree has spent much of his coaching career based in Sweden while maintaining strong ties to Irish basketball.
