= Miguel Miranda =

Peruvian footballer (1966–2021)

Personal information
- Full name: Miguel Eduardo Miranda Campos
- Date of birth: 13 August 1966
- Place of birth: Lima, Peru
- Date of death: 6 March 2021 (aged 54)
- Place of death: Chiclayo, Peru
- Height: 1.89 m (6 ft 2 in)
- Position: Goalkeeper

Youth career
- 1982–1984: Sporting Cristal

Senior career*
Years	Team	Apps	(Gls)
1984–1986	Sporting Cristal	2	(0)
1987	UT Cajamarca	5	(0)
1988–1992	Sporting Cristal	98	(0)
1992–1993	Universitario	6	(0)
1993–1994	Deportivo Sipesa	43	(0)
1994–1995	Deportivo Pesquero	0	(0)
1996	Juan Aurich	24	(0)
1997–1998	Deportivo Municipal	27	(0)
1998	Shenyang Haishi	25	(0)
1999	Deportivo Wanka	0	(0)
2000	Shenyang Haishi	25	(0)
2001–2003	Sporting Cristal	47	(0)
2003–2004	Coronel Bolognesi	5	(0)
2004–2005	Estudiantes de Medicina	4	(0)
Total		311	(0)

International career
1993–2001	Peru	47	(0)

Managerial career
- 2010: Juan Aurich (goalkeeper coach)
- 2014–2016: Melgar (assistant)
- 2014: Melgar II
- 2015: Beijing Renhe (goalkeeper coach)
- 2016: Defensor La Bocana
- 2017: Alianza Atlético
- 2017: Alfonso Ugarte
- 2018–2019: Los Caimanes
- * Club domestic league appearances and goals

Miguel Eduardo Miranda Campos (13 August 1966 – 6 March 2021) was a Peruvian football player and coach.

== Club career ==
Miranda played club football as a goalkeeper for Sporting Cristal, Universidad Técnica de Cajamarca, Universitario, Juan Aurich, Deportivo Municipal, Deportivo Wanka, Coronel Bolognesi and Estudiantes de Medicina in Peru and Shenyang Haishi in China.

== International career ==
He obtained 47 international caps for the Peru national team. He made his debut on 26 May 1993 in a 0–0 draw against the United States, and played his last international match for his native country on 14 November 2001, in a 1–1 draw against Bolivia.

== Later life ==
After retiring from football, Miguel joined soccer team coach in Peru.

He died on 6 March 2021 at the age of 54.
