= Amit Tamir =

Israeli basketball player and coach

Amit Tamir עמית תמיר
Personal information
- Born: December 2, 1979 (age 46) Jerusalem, Israel
- Listed height: 2.08 m (6 ft 10 in)
- Listed weight: 118 kg (260 lb)

Career information
- College: California (2001–2004)
- NBA draft: 2004: undrafted
- Playing career: 1998–present
- Position: Power forward / center

Career history
- 1998–2001: Hapoel Jerusalem
- 2004–2005: PAOK
- 2005: AEK Athens
- 2005–2006: Maccabi Giv'at Shmuel
- 2006: AEL Larissa
- 2006–2007: Spirou Charleroi
- 2007–2008: Hapoel Holon
- 2008–2009: Ironi Ashkelon
- 2009: APOEL
- 2010–2011: Hapoel Jerusalem
- 2011–2012: Maccabi Rishon LeZion
- 2012–2018: Ironi Ramat Gan

Career highlights
- First-team All-Pac-10 (2003); Israeli Super League Champion (2008)

Amit Tamir (Hebrew: עמית יוסף תמיר; born December 2, 1979) is an Israeli professional basketball coach and former player. He is a 2.08 m (6 ft 10 in) tall former center/forward.

== Biography ==
Amit Yosef Tamir was born in Jerusalem to Asher and Shula Tamir. He has two older sisters, Rozit and Gal, and a younger brother, Daniel. He attended Ort High School in Jerusalem. He served three years in the Israeli Army. He studied at the University of California Berkeley, where he was an American studies major.

== Basketball career ==
Tamir started to play on Hapoel Jerusalem's youth team in 1997, and played on the professional team from 1998 until 2001.

He led his high school team to the Jerusalem high school title. He played for the Israeli under-22 team at the 1998 European Championships in Sicily. Playing for UC Berkeley, he earned both Pac-10 All-Academic and first team All-Pac-10 status in 2003. He was selected one of the Top 50 preseason candidates for the 2003-04 Wooden Award All-America team. He finished his career at Berkeley 4th in free-throw percentage (81.1%), and 6th in 3-point field goals made (136-373, 36.5%).

He was registered for the 2004 NBA draft and got praises by Andre Iguodala about his abilities; he declined an offer by Miami Heat to be selected in the 2nd round and to be sent back to Europe and was not chosen by any franchise. He then played for Orlando Magic in the NBA summer league but was not selected for the team.

He moved to Greece after college, where he played for PAOK Thessaloniki BC. He played in the 2004 ULEB Cup with that team. He played with AEK Athens BC and AEL 1964 in 2005 and then moved back to Israel. There he played for Maccabi Givat Shmual. The team nearly qualified for the Final Four that year.

In the 2006/2007 season he played in Belgium for Spirou Charleroi. In 2007/2008 he started the season in Cherkassy from Ukraine, but he was released and joined Hapoel Holon during the season, with whom he won the Israeli League championship.

In the 2008/2009 season he played for Elitzur Ashkelon. In the 2009/2010 season he moved to APOEL B.C. from Cyprus. In November 2010 he returned to play for Hapoel Jerusalem B.C.

Since 2012 Tamir has played for Ironi Ramat Gan. He recently signed a two-year contract with the team.

== See also ==
- List of select Jewish basketball players
