= Artem Butskyy =

Ukrainian basketball player

Artem Butskyj
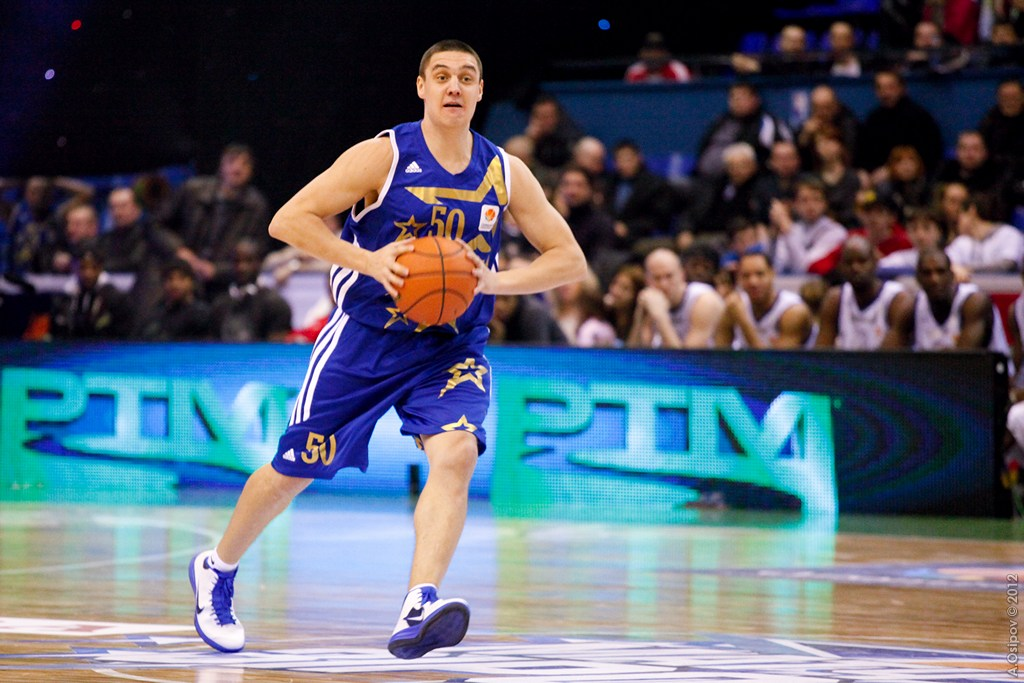

No. 20 – Budivelnyk Kyiv
- Position: Point guard
- League: UA SuperLeague; Euroleague

Personal information
- Born: 24 August 1981 (age 45) Poltava
- Listed height: 6 ft 1 in (1.85 m)
- Listed weight: 198 lb (90 kg)

Career information
- NBA draft: 2003: undrafted
- Playing career: 2000–present

Career history
- 2004–2005: BC Sumyhimprom
- 2005-2006: BC Kyiv
- 2006-2007: BC Cherkaski Mavpy
- 2007-2008: BC Sumyhimprom
- 2008–2009: BC Odesa
- 2009-2011: MBC Mykolaiv
- 2011–2014: BC Zaporizhzhia
- 2015–present: BC Budivelnyk

Career highlights
- Most Improved Player of the Year (2005); Ukrainian Cup (2013)

Artem Butskyy (born August 24, 1981) is a Ukrainian professional basketball player for Budivelnyk Kyiv of the UA SuperLeague.

June 28, 2005 signed a three-year contract with BC Kyiv.
