= Christian Drejer =

Danish basketball player (born 1982)

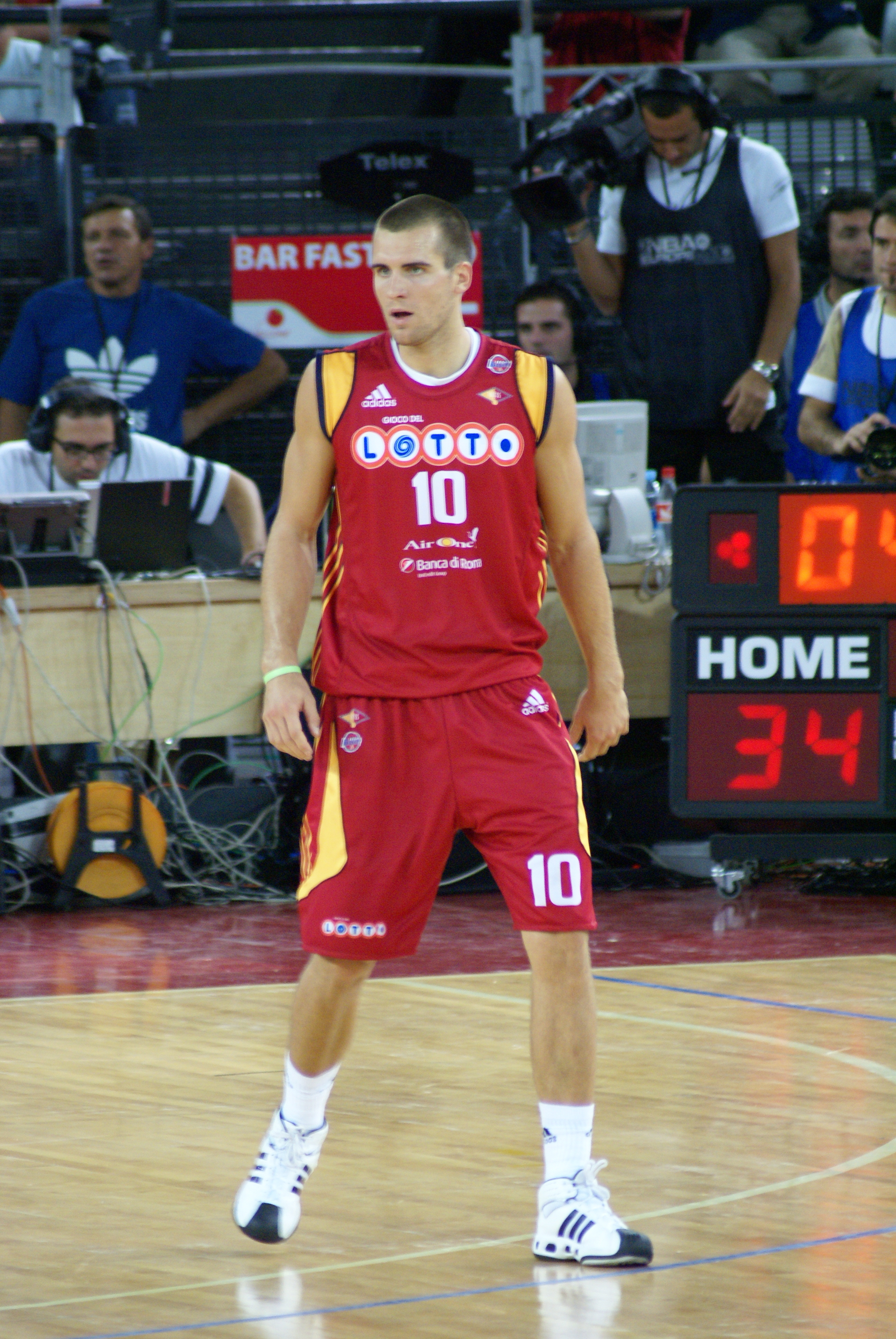
- Drejer with Lottomatica Roma

Personal information
- Born: 8 December 1982 (age 43) Copenhagen, Denmark
- Listed height: 6 ft 9 in (2.06 m)
- Listed weight: 225 lb (102 kg)

Career information
- College: Florida (2002–2004)
- NBA draft: 2004: 2nd round, 51st overall pick
- Drafted by: New Jersey Nets
- Playing career: 2000–2008
- Position: Small forward
- Number: 10

Career history
- 2000–2002: SISU BK
- 2004–2005: Winterthur FCB
- 2005–2007: Virtus Bologna
- 2007–2008: Lottomatica Virtus Roma

Career highlights
- Basketligaen Player of the Year (2002)
- Stats at Basketball Reference

Johan Christian Drejer (born 8 December 1982) is a Danish retired professional basketball player who in March 2008 was released from his contract with Virtus Roma and is a former player of SISU Copenhagen, the Florida Gators, Winterthur FCB and Virtus Bologna.

== Professional career ==
Drejer was named the Basketligaen Player of the Year in 2002 after averaging 31.6 points and 6.4 rebounds per game. He was also a Danish national team player. He was drafted in the second round of the 2004 NBA draft by the New Jersey Nets with the 51st pick as the first Dane ever drafted by the NBA. This pick was not without controversy as some had been questioning his character because he had quit the Florida Gators basketball team halfway through the previous season. He never played in the NBA.

=== Retirement ===
In his first year of college basketball, Drejer had an injury in his left foot which kept him sidelined for most of the season. The injury remained a problem for the rest of his career. In 2007–08 he had surgery twice but never fully recovered; in March 2008 he was released from his contract by Virtus Roma and on 11 March the Basketball Federation of Denmark (Danmarks Basketball-Forbund) sent out a press release announcing Drejer's retirement.
