= Feliks Kojadinović =

Bosnian Serb basketball player

Personal information
- Born: 12 June 1979 (age 47) Bosanska Gradiška, SR Bosnia and Herzegovina, SFR Yugoslavia
- Listed height: 1.97 m (6 ft 6 in)
- Listed weight: 89 kg (196 lb)

Career information
- NBA draft: 2001: undrafted
- Playing career: 1997–2013
- Position: Shooting guard

Career history
- 1997–1998: Borac Banja Luka
- 1998–2000: Orlovi Trznica Banja Luka
- 2000–2004: Borac Banja Luka
- 2004–2006: NIS Vojvodina
- 2006: CSK VVS Samara
- 2006–2007: PAOK
- 2007–2008: Maroussi
- 2008–2009: Cherkasy Monkeys
- 2009–2010: Bosna
- 2010–2011: Maroussi
- 2011–2012: Keravnos
- 2012–2013: BBC Monthey
Medals
Representing Serbia and Montenegro
Universiade
Bronze medal – third place	2005 İzmir	National Team

Feliks Kojadinović (born 12 June 1979) is a former Bosnian/Serbian professional basketball player. He played the shooting guard position.
