= Miguel Minhava =

Portuguese basketball player

Galitos FC
- Position: Point guard

Personal information
- Born: 3 November 1983 (age 43) Lisbon
- Listed height: 6 ft 5.75 in (1.97 m)
- Listed weight: 196 lb (89 kg)

Career information
- Playing career: 1999–2017

Career history
- 1999–2004: Barreirense
- 2004–2006: CF Belenenses
- 2006–2013: Benfica

Miguel António Cabrita Minhava (born 5 November 1983, Lisbon) is a Portuguese former basketball player. He developed his basketball skills from a young age, playing for his hometown and youth basketball club. He later played for CF Belenenses and Spanish side CB L'Hospitalet in 2007–08. Minhava represented Benfica from 2006 to 2013.

== Titles ==
=== Benfica ===
- Liga Portuguesa de Basquetebol: 4
  - 2008–09, 2009–10, 2011–12, 2012−13
- Taça da Liga / Hugo dos Santos: 2
  - 2010–11, 2012−13
- Supertaça: 3
  - 2008–09, 2009–10, 2012−13
- António Pratas Trophy: 3
  - 2007-08, 2008–09, 2011–12
- Supertaça Portugal-Angola: 1
  - 2009–10
