= Giorgi Gamqrelidze =

Georgian basketball player

Free agent
- Position: Point guard

Personal information
- Born: February 4, 1986 (age 40) Tbilisi, Georgian SSR, Soviet Union
- Listed height: 1.83 m (6 ft 0 in)
- Listed weight: 173 lb (78 kg)

Career information
- NBA draft: 2008: undrafted
- Playing career: 2003–present

Career history
- 2003–2005: Dinamo Tbilisi
- 2005–2006: Raiffeisen Fürstenfeld
- 2006–2009: Rustavi
- 2009–2010: Mitteldeutscher BC
- 2011–2012: Gießen 46ers
- 2012: Olimpi Tbilisi
- 2012–2013: Armia
- 2013–2016: Dinamo Tbilisi
- 2016–2017: Titebi Tbilisi

Giorgi Gamqrelidze (born February 4, 1986) is a Georgian professional basketball player who last played for Titebi Tbilisi and the Georgian national team, where he participated at the EuroBasket 2011.
