= Márton Báder =

Hungarian basketball player (born 1980)

Personal information
- Born: September 23, 1980 (age 46) Budapest, Hungary
- Listed height: 2.12 m (6 ft 11 in)
- Listed weight: 106 kg (234 lb)

Career information
- NBA draft: 2002: undrafted
- Playing career: 1998–2015
- Position: Power forward / center

Career history
- 1998–2000: Budapesti Honvéd
- 2000–2002: Albacomp
- 2002–2004: Krka
- 2004–2005: Cibona
- 2006: Ricoh Manresa
- 2006–2007: Cibona
- 2007: Panellinios
- 2008: Prostějov
- 2008–2009: Khimik
- 2009: Hemofarm
- 2010–2015: Szolnoki Olaj

Career highlights
- Slovenian League (2003); Croatian League (2007); 4× Hungarian League (2011, 2012, 2014, 2015); 4× Hungarian Cup (2011, 2012, 2014, 2015)

Márton Báder (born September 23, 1980) is a Hungarian former professional basketball player. He is 2.12 m (6 ft 11 1/2 in) tall, and played as a forward-center.

After starting his career in his homeland, Báder played in several countries including Slovenia, Croatia, Spain, Greece, Ukraine and Serbia. He was also a long-time member of the Hungarian national team.

Báder was awarded the Hungarian Cross of Merit (silver class) in 2013 for his career as a sportsman and his work to promote Hungarian basketball. He was elected President of the Hungarian Basketball Federation in May 2023.

== See also ==
- List of foreign basketball players in Serbia
