= Estonia men's national basketball team results (2017–present) =

This is a list of the Estonia men's national basketball team results from 2017 to present.

== 2017 ==
24 November 2017 2019 FIBA World Cup qualifiers – 1st round	Israel	88–68	Estonia	Tel Aviv, Israel
14:00 (GMT+2)	Scoring by quarter: 21–21, 17–14, 27–19, 23–14
	Pts: Howell 19; Rebs: Cohen, Howell 7 Asts: Howell 7	Boxscore	Pts: Kitsing, Veideman 14; Rebs: Veideman 6 Asts: Veideman 5	Arena: Drive in Arena; Attendance: 3,000; Referees: Yener Yılmaz (TUR), Petar Obradović (BIH), Marius Ciulin (ROU)

27 November 2017 2019 FIBA World Cup qualifiers – 1st round	Estonia	73–70	Great Britain	Tallinn, Estonia
19:00 (GMT+2)	Scoring by quarter: 18–24, 26–12, 15–21, 14–13
	Pts: Paasoja 15; Rebs: Talts 9 Asts: Sokk 5	Boxscore	Pts: Soko 17; Rebs: Hesson 8 Asts: Okereafor 5	Arena: Kalev Sports Hall; Attendance: 1,640; Referees: Janusz Calik (POL), Petr Hrůša (CZE), Radomir Vojinović (MNE)

== 2018 ==
23 February 2018 2019 FIBA World Cup qualifiers – 1st round	Greece	87–75	Estonia	Heraklion, Greece
18:30 (GMT+2)	Scoring by quarter: 20–18, 15–11, 26–13, 26–33
	Pts: Bourousis 21; Rebs: Bourousis 8 Asts: Bochoridis, Bourousis 6	Boxscore	Pts: Sokk 16; Rebs: Talts 5 Asts: Sokk 6	Arena: Heraklion Arena; Attendance: 2,500; Referees: Tomas Jasevičius (LTU), Uroš Nikolić (SRB), Borys Shulga (UKR)

25 February 2018 2019 FIBA World Cup qualifiers – 1st round	Estonia	78–62	Israel	Tallinn, Estonia
17:00 (GMT+2)	Scoring by quarter: 17–19, 20–14, 19–20, 22–9
	Pts: Olmre 16; Rebs: Talts 10; Asts: Sokk 7	Boxscore	Pts: Cohen 12; Rebs: Mekel 8 Asts: Mekel 4	Arena: Saku Suurhall; Attendance: 2,500; Referees: Yohan Rosso (FRA), Vilius Mačiulaitis (LTU), Arnis Ozols (LAT)

29 June 2018 2019 FIBA World Cup qualifiers – 1st round	Great Britain	74–65	Estonia	Glasgow, Great Britain
19:30 (GMT+1)	Scoring by quarter: 19–20, 15–19, 20–14, 20–12
	Pts: Clark 20; Rebs: Olaseni 12; Asts: Okereafor 6	Boxscore	Pts: Vene 24; Rebs: Raieste 9 Asts: Veideman 7	Arena: Emirates Arena; Attendance: 1,766; Referees: Lorenzo Baldini (ITA), Özlem Yalman (TUR), Marek Kúkelčík (SVK)

2 July 2018 2019 FIBA World Cup qualifiers – 1st round	Estonia	56–78	Greece	Tallinn, Estonia
19:30 (GMT+1)	Scoring by quarter: 13–15, 14–20, 21–21, 8–22
	Pts: Raieste 14; Rebs: Kullamäe, Raieste 5 Asts: Kullamäe 3	Boxscore	Pts: T. Antetokounmpo, Mitoglu 18; Rebs: Bochoridis, Mitoglu 7 Asts: four players 3	Arena: Saku Suurhall; Attendance: 3,124; Referees: Srđan Dožai (CRO), Ademir Zurapović (BIH), Fernando Calatrava (ESP)

13 September 2018 2019 FIBA World Cup qualifiers – 2nd round	Estonia	43–86	Germany	Tallinn, Estonia
19:00 (GMT+3)	Scoring by quarter: 15–26, 9–23, 6–24, 13–13
	Pts: Veideman 14; Rebs: Nurger, Veideman 4 Asts: Kotsar 4	Boxscore	Pts: Schröder 18; Rebs: Barthel 8 Asts: Schröder 10	Arena: Saku Suurhall; Attendance: 3,312; Referees: Tomas Jasevičius (LTU), Oskars Lūsis (LAT), Sergei Beliakov (RUS)

16 September 2018 2019 FIBA World Cup qualifiers – 2nd round	Serbia	91–65	Estonia	Belgrade, Serbia
20:15 (GMT+2)	Scoring by quarter: 22–16, 23–13, 29–11, 17–25
	Pts: Bjelica 14; Rebs: Bjelica 6 Asts: Jović, Micić 4	Boxscore	Pts: Kajupank 17; Rebs: Raieste 4 Asts: Kullamäe, Veideman 5	Arena: Aleksandar Nikolić Hall; Attendance: 5,700; Referees: Antonio Conde (ESP), Yener Yılmaz (TUR), Mehmet Karabilecen (TUR)

30 November 2018 2019 FIBA World Cup qualifiers – 2nd round	Estonia	73–80	Georgia	Tallinn, Estonia
19:00 (GMT+2)	Scoring by quarter: 19–22, 13–19, 17–16, 24–23
	Pts: Jõesaar 14; Rebs: Jõesaar, Kangur 7 Asts: four players 3	Boxscore	Pts: Shermadini 23; Rebs: Bitadze, Shermadini 11; Asts: Tsintsadze 7	Arena: Saku Suurhall; Attendance: 2,300; Referees: Ademir Zurapović (BIH), Alexey Davydov (RUS), Martin Vulić (CRO)

3 December 2018 2019 FIBA World Cup qualifiers – 2nd round	Germany	87–70	Estonia	Ludwigsburg, Germany
20:00 (GMT+1)	Scoring by quarter: 21–19, 23–13, 29–11, 17–25
	Pts: Thiemann 16; Rebs: Thiemann 7 Asts: Doreth 4	Boxscore	Pts: Vene 18; Rebs: Jõesaar 6 Asts: Sokk 4	Arena: Arena Ludwigsburg; Attendance: 3,491; Referees: Yohan Rosso (FRA), Vilius Mačiulaitis (LTU), Blaž Zupančič (SLO)

== 2019 ==
21 February 2019 2019 FIBA World Cup qualifiers – 2nd round	Estonia	71–70	Serbia	Tallinn, Estonia
19:00 (GMT+2)	Scoring by quarter: 14–16, 17–18, 18–20, 22–16
	Pts: Kitsing, Kullamäe 18; Rebs: Jõesaar 9 Asts: Raieste 5	Boxscore	Pts: Jelovac 19; Rebs: Jelovac 8 Asts: Teodosić 10	Arena: Saku Suurhall; Attendance: 5,426; Referees: Saverio Lanzarini (ITA), Mārtiņš Kozlovskis (LAT), Dariusz Zapolski (POL)

24 February 2019 2019 FIBA World Cup qualifiers – 2nd round	Georgia	77–84	Estonia	Tbilisi, Georgia
19:00 (GMT+4)	Scoring by quarter: 27–21, 15–27, 20–12, 15–24
	Pts: Shermadini 22; Rebs: Shermadini 15; Asts: Tsintsadze 5	Boxscore	Pts: Kullamäe 18; Rebs: Kitsing 8 Asts: Kullamäe 5	Arena: Tbilisi Sports Palace; Attendance: 4,780; Referees: Oskars Lūsis (LAT), Zafer Yılmaz (TUR), Luka Kardum (CRO)

== 2020 ==
20 February 2020 EuroBasket 2022 qualifiers	North Macedonia	72–81	Estonia	Skopje, North Macedonia
20:15	Scoring by quarter: 18–20, 5–25, 23–15, 26–21
	Pts: V. Stojanovski 26; Rebs: Whittington 8 Asts: Gjuroski, V. Stojanovski 3	Boxscore	Pts: Kullamäe 31; Rebs: Nurger 6 Asts: Kullamäe, Veideman 5	Arena: Boris Trajkovski Sports Center; Referees: Mārtiņš Kozlovskis (LAT), Mehmet Sahin (TUR), Zdenko Tomašovič (SVK)

23 February 2020 EuroBasket 2022 qualifiers	Estonia	81–87	Italy	Tallinn, Estonia
18:00 (UTC+2)	Scoring by quarter: 18–18, 29–23, 14–18, 20–28
	Pts: Kitsing 22; Rebs: Jõesaar 9 Asts: Kullamäe 8	Boxscore	Pts: Vitali 22; Rebs: three players 4 Asts: Spissu 8	Arena: Saku Suurhall; Referees: Mārtiņš Kozlovskis (LAT), Martin Horozov (BUL), Petr Hrůša (CZE)

28 November 2020 EuroBasket 2022 qualifiers	Estonia	56–84	Russia	Tallinn, Estonia* (Note: Due to the COVID-19 pandemic, all matches in the November 2020 and February 2021 windows were played behind closed doors in select host cities.)
20:30 (UTC+2)	Scoring by quarter: 14–18, 13–23, 15–21, 14–22
	Pts: Jõesaar 11; Rebs: Treier 7 Asts: Veideman 8	Boxscore	Pts: Baburin 19; Rebs: Vorontsevich 6 Asts: Strebkov 7	Arena: Saku Suurhall; Referees: Mārtiņš Kozlovskis (LAT), Martin Horozov (BUL), Petr Hrůša (CZE)

== 2021 ==
19 February 2021 EuroBasket 2022 qualifiers	Italy	101–105(OT)	Estonia	Perm, Russia*
16:30 (UTC+3)	Scoring by quarter: 21–20, 23–34, 22–28, 28–12, Overtime: 7–11
	Pts: Vitali 24; Rebs: Vitali 9 Asts: Spissu 6	Boxscore	Pts: Kotsar 32; Rebs: Treier 6 Asts: Sokk 14	Arena: Molot Sports Hall; Referees: Yener Yılmaz (TUR), Zdeno Tomašovič (SVK), Gvidas Gedvilas (LTU)

21 February 2021 EuroBasket 2022 qualifiers	Russia	75–52	Estonia	Perm, Russia*
20:00 (UTC+3)	Scoring by quarter: 17–15, 16–12, 20–18, 22–7
	Pts: Baburin 14; Rebs: Ivlev 10; Asts: Vorontsevich 4	Boxscore	Pts: Jõesaar 10; Rebs: Jõesaar, Nurger 5 Asts: Kotsar 4	Arena: Molot Sports Hall; Attendance: 2,852; Referees: Zafer Yılmaz (TUR), Carsten Straube (GER), Steve Bittner (GER)

22 February 2021* (Note: Due to several COVID-19 positive tests by Macedonian players, the match originally scheduled for Nov. 2020 was postponed to Feb. 2021.) EuroBasket 2022 qualifiers	Estonia	84–86	North Macedonia	Perm, Russia*
19:00 (UTC+3)	Scoring by quarter: 27–18, 22–20, 20–25, 15–23
	Pts: Kotsar 15; Rebs: Treier 12; Asts: Sokk 7	Boxscore	Pts: Dimitrijevikj 23; Rebs: Wiley 14; Asts: Dimitrijevikj 5	Arena: Molot Sports Hall; Referees: Tomas Jasevičius (LTU), Yener Yılmaz (TUR), Zafer Yılmaz (TUR)

25 November 2021 2023 FIBA World Cup qualifiers – 1st round	Germany	66–69	Estonia	Nuremberg
19:00	Scoring by quarter: 18–17, 16–13, 19–25, 13–14
	Pts: Sengfelder 21; Rebs: Sengfelder 8 Asts: Benzing, Hollatz 3	Boxscore	Pts: Kullamäe, Vene 15; Rebs: Nurger 6 Asts: Kullamäe 7	Arena: KIA Metropol Arena; Attendance: 900; Referees: Boris Krejić (SLO), Andrei Sharapa (BLR), Geert Jacobs (BEL)
Note:

28 November 2021 2023 FIBA World Cup qualifiers – 1st round	Estonia	69–79	Israel	Tallinn
19:00	Scoring by quarter: 14–20, 22–19, 17–22, 16–18
	Pts: Jurkatamm 14; Rebs: Drell, Treier 5 Asts: Kullamäe, Vene 4	Boxscore	Pts: four players 10; Rebs: Levi 11; Asts: Mekel 10	Arena: Saku Suurhall; Attendance: 2,532; Referees: Luis Castillo (ESP), Andris Aunkrogers (LAT), Mehmet Sahin (TUR)

== 2022 ==
25 February 2022 2023 FIBA World Cup qualifiers – 1st round	Estonia	75–71	Poland	Tallinn
19:00	Scoring by quarter: 15–14, 32–22, 13–18, 15–17
	Pts: Jõesaar 22; Rebs: Kotsar 10; Asts: Rosenthal 9	Boxscore	Pts: Garbacz 15; Rebs: Garbacz 5 Asts: Sokołowski 7	Arena: Saku Suurhall; Attendance: 2,857; Referees: Marek Kúkelčík (SVK), Gatis Saliņš (LAT), Josip Jurčević (CRO)
Note:

28 February 2022 2023 FIBA World Cup qualifiers – 1st round	Poland	70–68	Estonia	Lublin
18:00	Scoring by quarter: 12–21, 26–21, 17–14, 15–12
	Pts: Sokołowski 15; Rebs: Ponitka, Zyskowski 5 Asts: Schenk 7	Boxscore	Pts: Kotsar 24; Rebs: Kotsar 7 Asts: Rosenthal 5	Arena: Globus Arena; Attendance: 1,520; Referees: Georgios Poursanidis (GRE), Özlem Yalman (TUR), Martin Vulić (CRO)
Note:

30 June 2022 2023 FIBA World Cup qualifiers – 1st round	Estonia	57–88	Germany	Tallinn
19:00	Scoring by quarter: 11–18, 11–13, 16–36, 19–21
	Pts: Kotsar 13; Rebs: Kotsar 7 Asts: Kullamäe, Treier 4	Boxscore	Pts: Sengfelder 23; Rebs: Sengfelder 9 Asts: Schröder 9	Arena: Saku Suurhall; Attendance: 4,326; Referees: Nicolás Maestre (FRA), Thomas Bissuel (FRA), Zdenko Tomašovič (SVK)
Note:

3 July 2022 2023 FIBA World Cup qualifiers – 1st round	Israel	96–77	Estonia	Tel Aviv
20:30	Scoring by quarter: 29–22, 19–22, 24–13, 24–20
	Pts: Ginat 17; Rebs: Zoosman 8 Asts: Blatt, Mekel 6	Boxscore	Pts: Kotsar 13; Rebs: Kullamäe 6 Asts: Kullamäe 8	Arena: Drive in Arena; Attendance: 3,500; Referees: Ademir Zurapović (BIH), Gintaras Vitkauskas (LTU), Zdravko Rutešić (MNE)
Note:

25 August 2022 2023 FIBA World Cup qualifiers – 2nd round	Slovenia	104–83	Estonia	Celje, Slovenia
20:30 (UTC+2)	Scoring by quarter: 27–23, 29–15, 21–25, 27–20
	Pts: Dončić 25; Rebs: Dončić 11; Asts: Dončić 8	Boxscore	Pts: Kriisa 14; Rebs: Tass 5 Asts: Kriisa 5	Arena: Zlatorog Arena; Attendance: 5,100; Referees: Zafer Yılmaz (TUR), Andris Aunkrogers (LAT), Ilias Kounelles (CYP)

28 August 2022 2023 FIBA World Cup qualifiers – 2nd round	Estonia	68–76	Finland	Tallinn, Estonia
18:00 (UTC+3)	Scoring by quarter: 21–23, 15–24, 18–10, 14–19
	Pts: Kotsar 14; Rebs: Kotsar 9 Asts: Kriisa, Kullamäe 4	Boxscore	Pts: Salin 20; Rebs: Madsen 20; Asts: Maxhuni	Arena: Saku Suurhall; Attendance: 3,877; Referees: Ademir Zurapović (BIH), Viola Györgyi (NOR), Gintaras Mačiulis (LTU)

2 September 2022 EuroBasket 2022 – Group stage	Italy	83–62	Estonia	Mediolanum Forum, Milan
21:00	Scoring by quarter: 21–18, 31–15, 17–19, 14–10
	Pts: Fontecchio 19; Rebs: Polonara 11; Asts: Spissu 6	Boxscore	Pts: Kriisa 20; Rebs: Jõesaar 4 Asts: Kriisa, Kullamäe 6	Attendance: 10,864; Referees: Nicolas Maestre (FRA), Radomir Vojinović (MNE), Carsten Straube (GER)
Note:

3 September 2022 EuroBasket 2022 – Group stage	Estonia	73–74	Ukraine	Mediolanum Forum, Milan
17:00	Scoring by quarter: 21–15, 14–18, 26–23, 12–18
	Pts: Kotsar 17; Rebs: Kotsar 9 Asts: Kriisa 8	Boxscore	Pts: Mykhailiuk 18; Rebs: Bliznyuk 9 Asts: Bliznyuk 5	Attendance: 4,418; Referees: Nicolas Maestre (FRA), Viola Györgyi (NOR), Zafer Yılmaz (TUR)
Note:

5 September 2022 EuroBasket 2022 – Group stage	Croatia	73–70	Estonia	Mediolanum Forum, Milan
14:15	Scoring by quarter: 20–16, 13–13, 20–19, 20–22
	Pts: Matković 17; Rebs: Šarić 12; Asts: Smith 7	Boxscore	Pts: Vene 18; Rebs: Drell 7 Asts: Kullamäe 5	Attendance: 2,972; Referees: Paulo Marques (POR), Zafer Yılmaz (TUR), Carsten Straube (GER)
Note:

6 September 2022 EuroBasket 2022 – Group stage	Estonia	94–62	Great Britain	Mediolanum Forum, Milan
14:15	Scoring by quarter: 24–18, 25–18, 29–17, 16–9
	Pts: Drell 20; Rebs: Kotsar, Raieste 8 Asts: Kriisa 7	Boxscore	Pts: Hesson 14; Rebs: Wheatle 11; Asts: Nelson 6	Attendance: 5,422; Referees: Radomir Vojinović (MNE), Zdravko Rutesić (MNE), Geert Jacobs (BEL)
Note:

8 September 2022 EuroBasket 2022 – Group stage	Estonia	69–90	Greece	Mediolanum Forum, Milan
17:00	Scoring by quarter: 21–27, 15–24, 13–26, 20–13
	Pts: Vene 19; Rebs: Drell 9 Asts: Kriisa, Kullamäe 4	Boxscore	Pts: G. Antetokounmpo 25; Rebs: G. Antetokounmpo 5 Asts: G. Antetokounmpo 4	Attendance: 4,852; Referees: Yohan Rosso (FRA), Carsten Straube (GER), Viola Györgyi (NOR)
Note:

11 November 2022 2023 FIBA World Cup qualifiers – 2nd round	Estonia	82–87	Sweden	Tallinn, Estonia
19:05 (UTC+2)	Scoring by quarter: 13–27, 24–12, 24–20, 21–28
	Pts: Kullamäe 24; Rebs: four players 7 Asts: Kullamäe 6	Boxscore	Pts: Håkanson 24; Rebs: Birgander 11; Asts: Håkanson 6	Arena: Saku Suurhall; Attendance: 3,040; Referees: Georgios Poursanidis (GRE), Andris Aunkrogers (LAT), Viola Györgyi (NOR)

14 November 2022 2023 FIBA World Cup qualifiers – 2nd round	Finland	91–71	Estonia	Espoo, Finland
18:30 (UTC+2)	Scoring by quarter: 21–16, 18–25, 27–15, 25–15
	Pts: Jantunen 24; Rebs: Jantunen, Madsen 8 Asts: Maxhuni 7	Boxscore	Pts: Konontšuk 13; Rebs: Konontšuk, Kullamäe 5 Asts: Tass 4	Arena: Espoo Metro Areena; Attendance: 5,528; Referees: Michał Proc (POL), Péter Praksch (HUN), Alexandre Deman (FRA)

== 2023 ==
24 February 2023 2023 FIBA World Cup qualifiers – 2nd round	Estonia	79–78	Slovenia	Tallinn, Estonia
17:00 (UTC+2)	Scoring by quarter: 24–16, 13–24, 18–19, 24–19
	Pts: Toom 15; Rebs: Riismaa, Treier 6 Asts: Rosenthal, Treier 4	Boxscore	Pts: Glas 18; Rebs: Mahkovic 7 Asts: Samar 9	Arena: Unibet Arena; Attendance: 3,832; Referees: Yohan Rosso (FRA), Dariusz Zapolski (POL), Geert Jacobs (BEL)

27 February 2023 2023 FIBA World Cup qualifiers – 2nd round	Sweden	71–72	Estonia	Malmö, Sweden
19:05 (UTC+1)	Scoring by quarter: 16–17, 14–11, 14–15, 27–29
	Pts: Pantzar 23; Rebs: Andersson, Pantzar 8 Asts: Pantzar 5	Boxscore	Pts: Kitsing 14; Rebs: Toom 6 Asts: Kullamäe 4	Arena: Baltiska Hallen; Attendance: 3,650; Referees: Özlem Yalman (TUR), Marek Kúkelčík (SVK), Josip Jurčević (CRO)

12 August 2023 2024 Olympic Pre-Qualifying – Group stage	Czech Republic	77–74	Estonia	Tallinn, Estonia
16:00 (UTC+3)	Scoring by quarter: 23–23, 19–16, 14–17, 21–18
	Pts: Krejčí 20; Rebs: Peterka 8 Asts: Krejčí 6	Boxscore	Pts: Konontšuk 16; Rebs: Raieste 6 Asts: Kullamäe 5	Arena: Tondiraba Ice Hall; Attendance: 3,654; Referees: Aleksandar Glišić (SRB), Mārtiņš Kozlovskis (LAT), Gintaras Mačiulis (LTU)

13 August 2023 2024 Olympic Pre-Qualifying – Group stage	Estonia	83–59	North Macedonia	Tallinn, Estonia
19:00 (UTC+3)	Scoring by quarter: 25–7, 19–15, 21–22, 18–15
	Pts: Treier 14; Rebs: Raieste 11; Asts: Kullamäe 9	Boxscore	Pts: Stojanovski 12; Rebs: Magdevski 6 Asts: Magdevski 4	Arena: Tondiraba Ice Hall; Attendance: 3,450; Referees: Aleksandar Glišić (SRB), Andris Aunkrogers (LAT), Viola Györgyi (NOR)

15 August 2023 2024 Olympic Pre-Qualifying – Group stage	Israel	65–67	Estonia	Tallinn, Estonia
19:00 (UTC+3)	Scoring by quarter: 12–20, 22–16, 16–16, 15–15
	Pts: Sorkin 18; Rebs: Sorkin 9 Asts: Madar 7	Boxscore	Pts: Treier 16; Rebs: Drell, Treier 7 Asts: Kullamäe, Raieste 5	Arena: Tondiraba Ice Hall; Attendance: 4,834; Referees: Andris Aunkrogers (LAT), Mārtiņš Kozlovskis (LAT), Zafer Yılmaz (TUR)

18 August 2023 2024 Olympic Pre-Qualifying – Semi-finals	Poland	93–83	Estonia	Gliwice, Poland
17:30 (UTC+2)	Scoring by quarter: 22–18, 19–17, 22–21, 30–27
	Pts: Sokołowski 19; Rebs: Balcerowski, Ponitka 8 Asts: Pluta 7	Boxscore	Pts: Treier 18; Rebs: Treier 6 Asts: Kullamäe 6	Arena: Gliwice Arena; Attendance: 2,945; Referees: Nicolás Maestre (FRA), Radomir Vojinović (MNE), Franko Gracin (CRO)

== 2024 ==
23 February 2024 EuroBasket 2025 qualifiers	North Macedonia	69–74	Estonia	Skopje, North Macedonia
19:00 (UTC+1)	Scoring by quarter: 20–19, 23–17, 10–21, 16–17
	Pts: Dimitrijević 25; Rebs: Happ 10; Asts: Dimitrijević, Happ 3	Boxscore	Pts: Kotsar, Vene 16; Rebs: Rosenthal 6 Asts: Jõesaar 5	Arena: SRC Kale; Attendance: 2,000; Referees: Kerem Baki (TUR), Ventsislav Velikov (BUL), Orhan Çağrı Hekimoğlu (TUR)

26 February 2024 EuroBasket 2025 qualifiers	Estonia	65–59	Lithuania	Tallinn, Estonia
19:00 (UTC+2)	Scoring by quarter: 17–18, 24–19, 9–13, 15–9
	Pts: Jõesaar 18; Rebs: Kotsar 13; Asts: Kullamäe 9	Boxscore	Pts: Ulanovas 16; Rebs: Tubelis 7 Asts: Dimša, Tubelis 3	Arena: Unibet Arena; Attendance: 6,471; Referees: Sergii Zashchuk (UKR), Franko Gracin (CRO), Ivor Matějek (CZE)

21 November 2024 EuroBasket 2025 qualifiers	Poland	78–82	Estonia	Włocławek, Poland
18:00 (UTC+1)	Scoring by quarter: 18–19, 22–19, 13–19, 25–25
	Pts: Ponitka 23; Rebs: Balcerowski 9 Asts: Sokołowski 7	Boxscore	Pts: Tass 19; Rebs: Kullamäe 6 Asts: Kullamäe 11	Arena: Hala Mistrzów; Attendance: 3,435; Referees: Paulo Marques (POR), Aleksandar Glišić (SRB), Viola Györgyi (NOR)

24 November 2024 EuroBasket 2025 qualifiers	Estonia	86–88	Poland	Tallinn, Estonia
18:00 (UTC+2)	Scoring by quarter: 25–22, 17–18, 21–22, 23–26
	Pts: Kullamäe 21; Rebs: Tass 12; Asts: Kullamäe 6	Boxscore	Pts: Michalak 29; Rebs: Ponitka 8 Asts: Ponitka 3	Arena: Unibet Arena; Attendance: 6,679; Referees: Martin Horozov (BUL), Sergii Zashchuk (UKR), Ilias Kounelles (CYP)

== 2025 ==
21 February 2025 EuroBasket 2025 qualifiers	Estonia	84–65	North Macedonia	Tallinn, Estonia
19:00 (UTC+2)	Scoring by quarter: 22–17, 16–22, 20–11, 26–15
	Pts: Kotsar 16; Rebs: Kotsar, Kullamäe 9 Asts: Kullamäe 9	Boxscore	Pts: Shorts 21; Rebs: Maslinko 7 Asts: Shorts 6	Arena: Unibet Arena; Attendance: 6,774; Referees: Yener Yılmaz (TUR), Zdenko Tomašovič (SVK), Valentin Oliot (FRA)

24 February 2025 EuroBasket 2025 qualifiers	Lithuania	82–75	Estonia	Klaipėda, Lithuania
19:30 (UTC+2)	Scoring by quarter: 28–19, 32–24, 7–21, 15–11
	Pts: Radzevičius 19; Rebs: Radzevičius 8 Asts: Velička, Žemaitis 6	Boxscore	Pts: Kotsar 16; Rebs: Konontšuk 8 Asts: Kullamäe 6	Arena: Švyturio Arena; Attendance: 3,919; Referees: Ademir Zurapović (BIH), Sergii Zashchuk (UKR), Cecília Montgomery-Tóth (HUN)

27 August 2025 EuroBasket 2025 – Group stage	Serbia	98–64	Estonia	Riga, Latvia
21:15 (UTC+3)	Scoring by quarter: 32–12, 24–17, 30–15, 12–20
	Pts: N. Jović 18; Rebs: Jokić 10; Asts: Bogdanović, Jokić 7	Boxscore	Pts: Drell 11; Rebs: Riismaa, Treier 4 Asts: Vene 5	Arena: Xiaomi Arena; Attendance: 8,151; Referees: Antonio Conde (ESP), Lorenzo Baldini (ITA), Geert Jacobs (BEL)

29 August 2025 EuroBasket 2025 – Group stage	Estonia	70–72	Latvia	Riga, Latvia
18:00 (UTC+3)	Scoring by quarter: 21–17, 21–21, 19–25, 9–9
	Pts: Konontšuk, Tass 13; Rebs: Jõesaar, Kullamäe 6 Asts: Kullamäe 8	Boxscore	Pts: Porziņģis 26; Rebs: Dāv. Bertāns 11; Asts: Žagars 6	Arena: Xiaomi Arena; Attendance: 10,291; Referees: Yohan Rosso (FRA), Marius Ciulin (ROU), Fernando Calatrava (ESP)

30 August 2025 EuroBasket 2025 – Group stage	Czech Republic	75–89	Estonia	Riga, Latvia
14:45 (UTC+3)	Scoring by quarter: 19–23, 17–31, 18–23, 21–12
	Pts: Žídek 14; Rebs: Bohačík 7 Asts: three players 4	Boxscore	Pts: Kullamäe 16; Rebs: Jõesaar 8 Asts: Kullamäe 7	Arena: Xiaomi Arena; Attendance: 8,190; Referees: Wojciech Liszka (POL), Lorenzo Baldini (ITA), Geert Jacobs (BEL)

1 September 2025 EuroBasket 2025 – Group stage	Estonia	64–84	Turkey	Riga, Latvia
14:45 (UTC+3)	Scoring by quarter: 13–25, 14–21, 22–19, 15–19
	Pts: Kullamäe 16; Rebs: five players 3 Asts: Konontšuk 5	Boxscore	Pts: Şengün 21; Rebs: Osmani 10; Asts: Şengün 5	Arena: Xiaomi Arena; Attendance: 4,844; Referees: Antonio Conde (ESP), Fernando Calatrava (ESP), Josip Jurčević (CRO)

3 September 2025 EuroBasket 2025 – Group stage	Estonia	65–68	Portugal	Riga, Latvia
14:45 (UTC+3)	Scoring by quarter: 14–14, 18–13, 13–20, 20–21
	Pts: Konontšuk 20; Rebs: Jõesaar 7 Asts: Kullamäe 6	Boxscore	Pts: Lisboa 17; Rebs: Queiroz 9 Asts: Lisboa 5	Arena: Xiaomi Arena; Attendance: 5,010; Referees: Antonio Conde (ESP), Lorenzo Baldini (ITA), Marius Ciulin (ROU)

28 November 2025 2027 FIBA World Cup qualifiers – 1st round	Slovenia	93–94(OT)	Estonia	Koper, Slovenia
19:00 (UTC+1)	Scoring by quarter: 20–19, 18–20, 20–26, 21–14, Overtime: 14–15
	Pts: Hrovat 23; Rebs: Cerkvenik, Omić 6 Asts: Samar 8	Boxscore	Pts: Drell 29; Rebs: Riismaa 8 Asts: Drell 6	Arena: Arena Bonifika; Attendance: 1,570; Referees: Yohan Rosso (FRA), Ventsislav Velkov (BUL), Zdenko Tomašovič (SVK)

1 December 2025 2027 FIBA World Cup qualifiers – 1st round	Estonia	92–97	Czech Republic	Tallinn, Estonia
20:00 (UTC+2)	Scoring by quarter: 29–27, 24–31, 21–22, 18–17
	Pts: Treier 26; Rebs: Konontšuk 5 Asts: Jõesaar 8	Boxscore	Pts: Satoranský 18; Rebs: Peterka, Sehnal 5 Asts: Satoranský 16	Arena: Unibet Arena; Attendance: 6,594; Referees: Martin Horozov (BUL), Zafer Yılmaz (TUR), Silvia Marziali (ITA)

== 2026 ==
27 February 2026 2027 FIBA World Cup qualifiers – 1st round	Sweden	77–88	Estonia	Stockholm, Sweden
19:00 (UTC+1)	Scoring by quarter: 22–22, 14–24, 22–11, 19–31
	Pts: Håkanson 21; Rebs: Hampton 7 Asts: Håkanson 6	Boxscore	Pts: Drell 23; Rebs: Konontšuk 6 Asts: Suurorg 5	Arena: Avicii Arena; Attendance: 9,364; Referees: Ventsislav Velikov (BUL), Lorenzo Baldini (ITA), Siniša Prpa (SRB)

1 March 2026 2027 FIBA World Cup qualifiers – 1st round	Estonia	69–79	Sweden	Tallinn, Estonia
19:00 (UTC+2)	Scoring by quarter: 22–23, 16–15, 17–13, 14–28
	Pts: Drell 16; Rebs: Jõesaar 6 Asts: Suurorg, Treier 4	Boxscore	Pts: Håkanson 18; Rebs: Bangala 10; Asts: Pantzar 7	Arena: Unibet Arena; Attendance: 6,637; Referees: Mārtiņš Kozlovskis (EST), Juozas Barkauskas (LTU), Ioannis Tsibouris (GRE)

3 July 2026 2027 FIBA World Cup qualifiers – 1st round	Estonia	93–62	Slovenia	Tallinn, Estonia
19:00 (UTC+3)	Scoring by quarter: 22–16, 24–15, 27–20, 20–11
	Pts: Vaaks 20; Rebs: Kotsar 12; Asts: Kotsar 9	Boxscore	Pts: Hrovat 12; Rebs: Omić 8 Asts: Samar 5	Arena: Unibet Arena; Attendance: 6,958; Referees: Wojciech Liszka (POL), Paulo Marques (POR), Tolga Edis (TUR)

6 July 2026 2027 FIBA World Cup qualifiers – 1st round	Czech Republic	75–73	Estonia	Brno, Czech Republic
17:00 (UTC+2)	Scoring by quarter: 24–20, 17–17, 11–16, 23–20
	Pts: Sehnal 15; Rebs: Peterka 7 Asts: Sehnal 8	Boxscore	Pts: Kotsar, Vaaks 19; Rebs: Kotsar 9 Asts: Vaaks 5	Arena: Starez Aréna Vodova; Attendance: 2,913; Referees: Yohan Rosso (FRA), Georgios Poursanidis (GRE), Roko Hordov (CRO)

27 August 2026 2027 FIBA World Cup qualifiers – 2nd round	Hungary	85–67	Estonia	Miskolc, Hungary
18:00 (UTC+2)	Scoring by quarter: 13–14, 24–20, 26–22, 22–11
	Pts: Perl 22; Rebs: Reuvers 8 Asts: Somogyi 5	Boxscore	Pts: Kullamäe 26; Rebs: Raieste 6 Asts: Suurorg 4	Arena: DVTK Aréna; Attendance: 1,800; Referees: Martin Vulić (CRO), Martin Horozov (BUL), Çisil Güngör (TUR)

30 August 2026 2027 FIBA World Cup qualifiers – 2nd round	Estonia	67–96	Finland	Tallinn, Estonia
19:00 (UTC+3)	Scoring by quarter: 21–21, 14–17, 11–28, 21–30
	Pts: Kullamäe 15; Rebs: three players 5 Asts: Kullamäe 5	Boxscore	Pts: Markkanen 21; Rebs: Markkanen 10; Asts: Nkamhoua 4	Arena: Unibet Arena; Attendance: 7,068; Referees: Petar Pešić (SRB), Yener Yılmaz (TUR), Ioannis Agrafiotis (GRE)
