= Estonia men's national basketball team =

Men's national basketball team representing Estonia

Estonia
- FIBA ranking: 38 ▼2 (1 September 2026)
- Joined FIBA: 1934; 1991
- FIBA zone: FIBA Europe
- National federation: Estonian Basketball Association
- Coach: Heiko Rannula

Olympic Games
- Appearances: 1
- Medals: None

FIBA World Cup
- Appearances: None

EuroBasket
- Appearances: 8
- Medals: None
Home	Away

First international
- Latvia 20–16 Estonia (Riga, Latvia; 29 April 1924)

Biggest win
- Estonia 91–1 Finland (Kaunas, Lithuania; 25 May 1939)

Biggest defeat
- FR Yugoslavia 113–58 Estonia (Antalya, Turkey; 1 September 2001)

The Estonia men's national basketball team (Estonian: Eesti korvpallikoondis) represents Estonia in international basketball matches. They are controlled by the Estonian Basketball Association. The team competed in their first international tournament at the 1936 Olympic Games. Estonia has also qualified for the EuroBasket seven times overall, with their best results coming in 1937 and 1939. However, after 1939, Estonia halted national team activities due to the occupation of the Baltic states during World War II. Estonia rejoined FIBA in 1991, after restoring independence from the Soviet Union.

== History ==
=== Early years (1920s–1930s) ===
Estonia played their first ever international match against their Baltic neighbors Latvia, on 29 April 1924, a 20–16 defeat in Riga. Ten years later, on 30 November 1934, Estonia became a member of FIBA. Two years after that, the national team played in their first international tournament at the 1936 Olympic Games, held in Berlin. It was the first Olympic tournament to hold basketball as an official medal event. Led by head coach Herbert Niiler, Estonia played their opening match of the tournament against France, where the team came away with a 34–29 win. The national team lost their subsequent second round game to the United States 28–52, but passed the consolation round and faced the Philippines in the third round, losing 22–39.

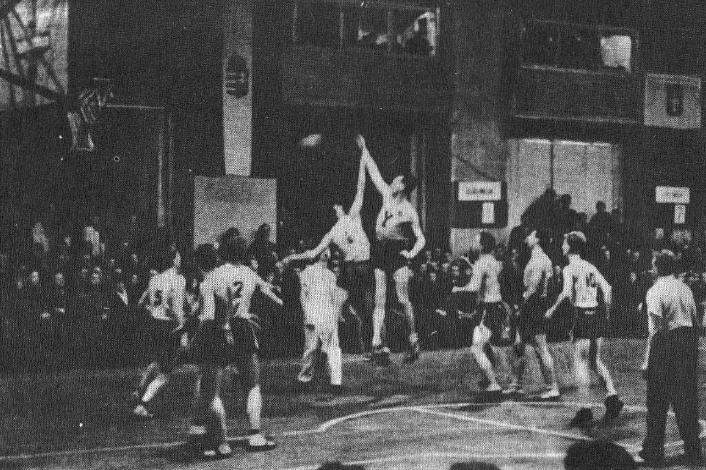
Game between Estonia and Lithuania at EuroBasket 1937.

Estonia participated at the European Basketball Championship for the first time in 1937. The team won its first game against Egypt 44–15, but failed to advance past the group stage after suffering a 15–20 defeat against Lithuania, and a 20–30 defeat against Italy. Estonia finished the tournament to place fifth in the final rankings, after defeating Czechoslovakia 30–20 and Latvia 41–19.

Two years later at the EuroBasket 1939, the tournament used a different format from the previous championship, with eight teams facing off in a round-robin competition. Estonia finished the tournament with a (4–3) record and again finished in fifth place at the event. Heino Veskila was the tournament's scoring leader averaging 16.7 points per game.

In 1940, Estonia was occupied by the Soviet Union and the team was disbanded.

=== National team restored (1990s) ===
After the restoration of independence, the Estonian Basketball Association rejoined FIBA in 1991. Estonia qualified for EuroBasket 1993, held in Germany. Despite missing star players Martin Müürsepp and Tiit Sokk, the team, coached by Jaak Salumets won their group in the preliminary round, finishing ahead of Slovenia, Belgium, and hosts and eventual champions Germany. In the second round, Estonia finished third in their group and advanced to the quarter-finals, where the team lost to Russia 61–82 to be eliminated. In the classification rounds, Estonia defeated Bosnia and Herzegovina 99–91 and lost to Spain 80–119, finishing the championship in sixth place with a (6–5) record. Aivar Kuusmaa was the team's scoring leader with 19.9 points per game.

=== 2000s–2010s ===
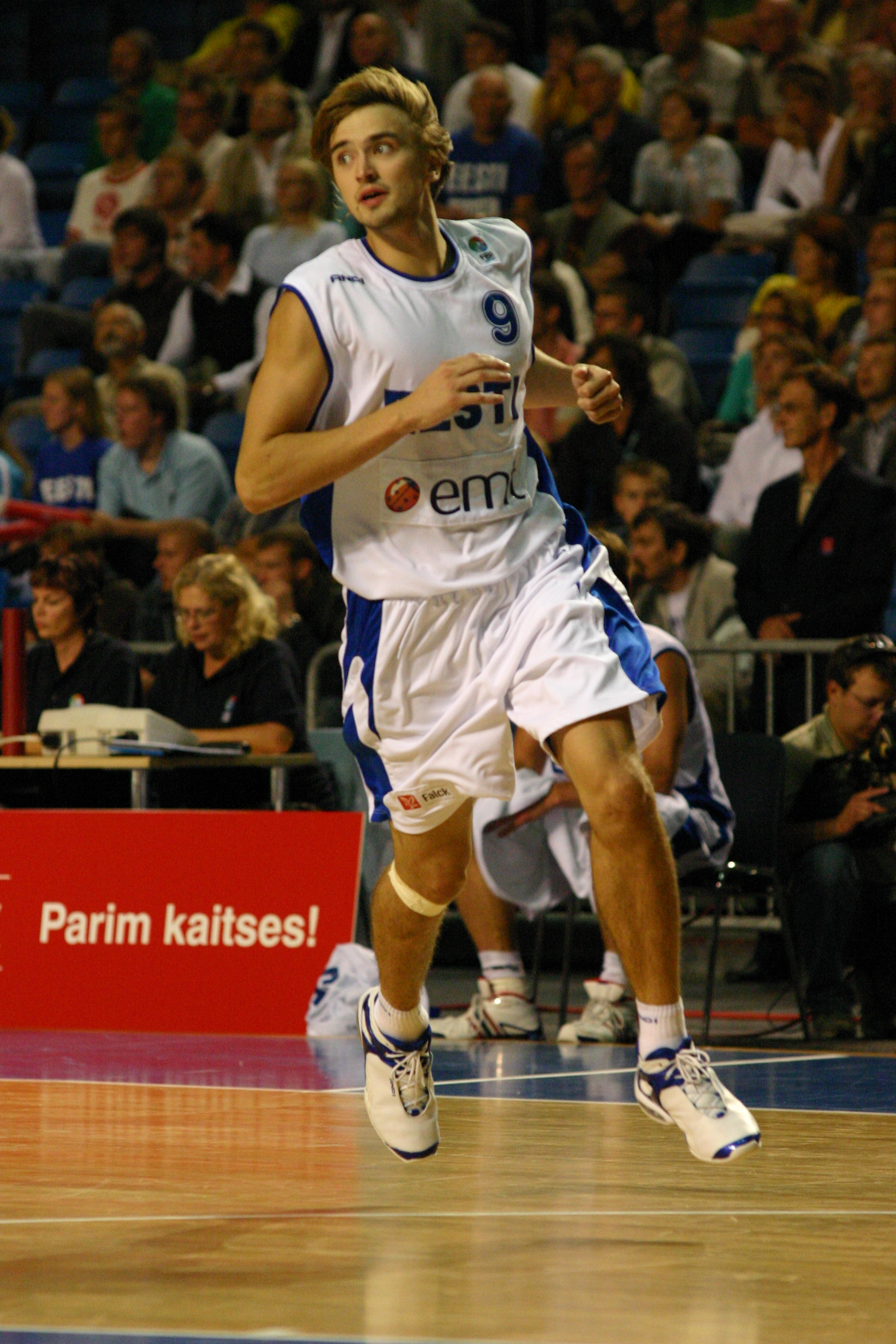
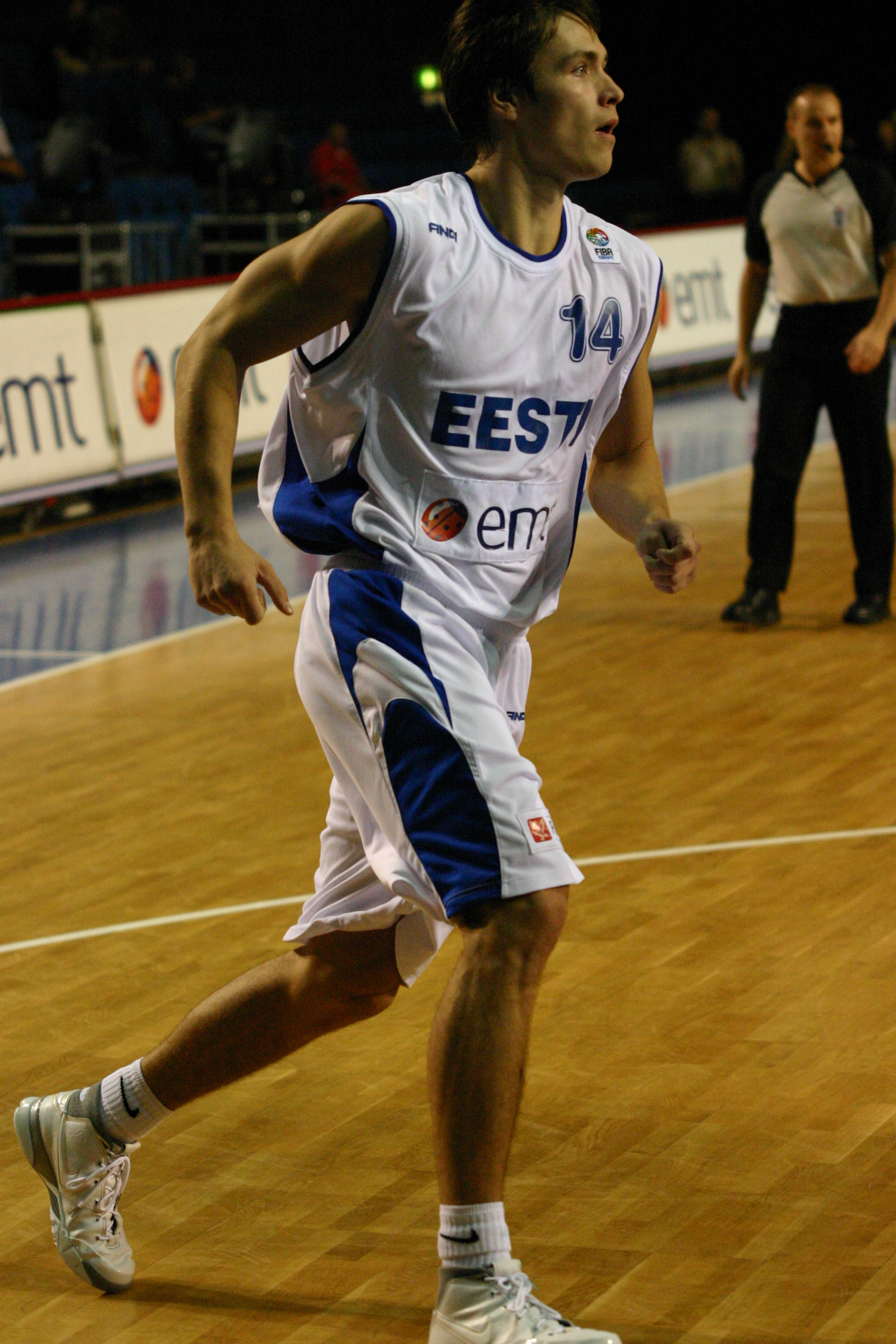
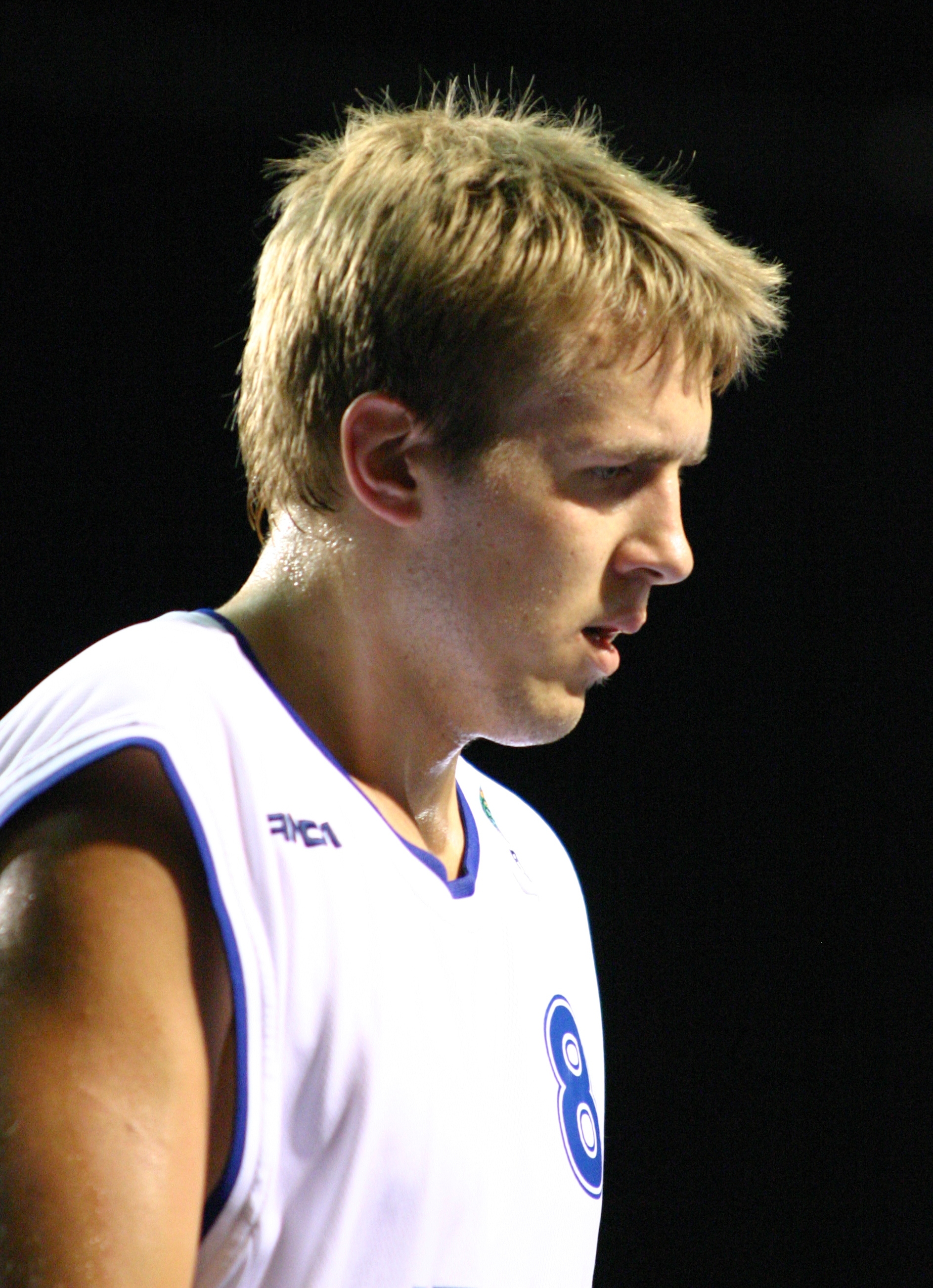
Gregor Arbet, Kristjan Kangur and Janar Talts led the national team during the 2010s.

Estonia once again qualified for the EuroBasket, after failing to qualify for the tournament on three occasions after 1993. The team went (7–3) during the qualification period to reach EuroBasket 2001, held in Turkey. Coached by Üllar Kerde, Estonia lost all three of their preliminary round matches against Germany, FR Yugoslavia and Croatia, failing to advance past the group stage and finishing the championship with a disappointing (0–3) record and a 14th place finish. Martin Müürsepp led the team in scoring with 18.3 points per game, while Margus Metstak collected 6.0 rebounds per game, and Rauno Pehka and Tanel Tein averaged 2.7 assists per game. After 2001, Estonia failed to qualify for another major international basketball tournament for 14 years. Although the team competed at the second tier Division B competition in 2011, winning their group.

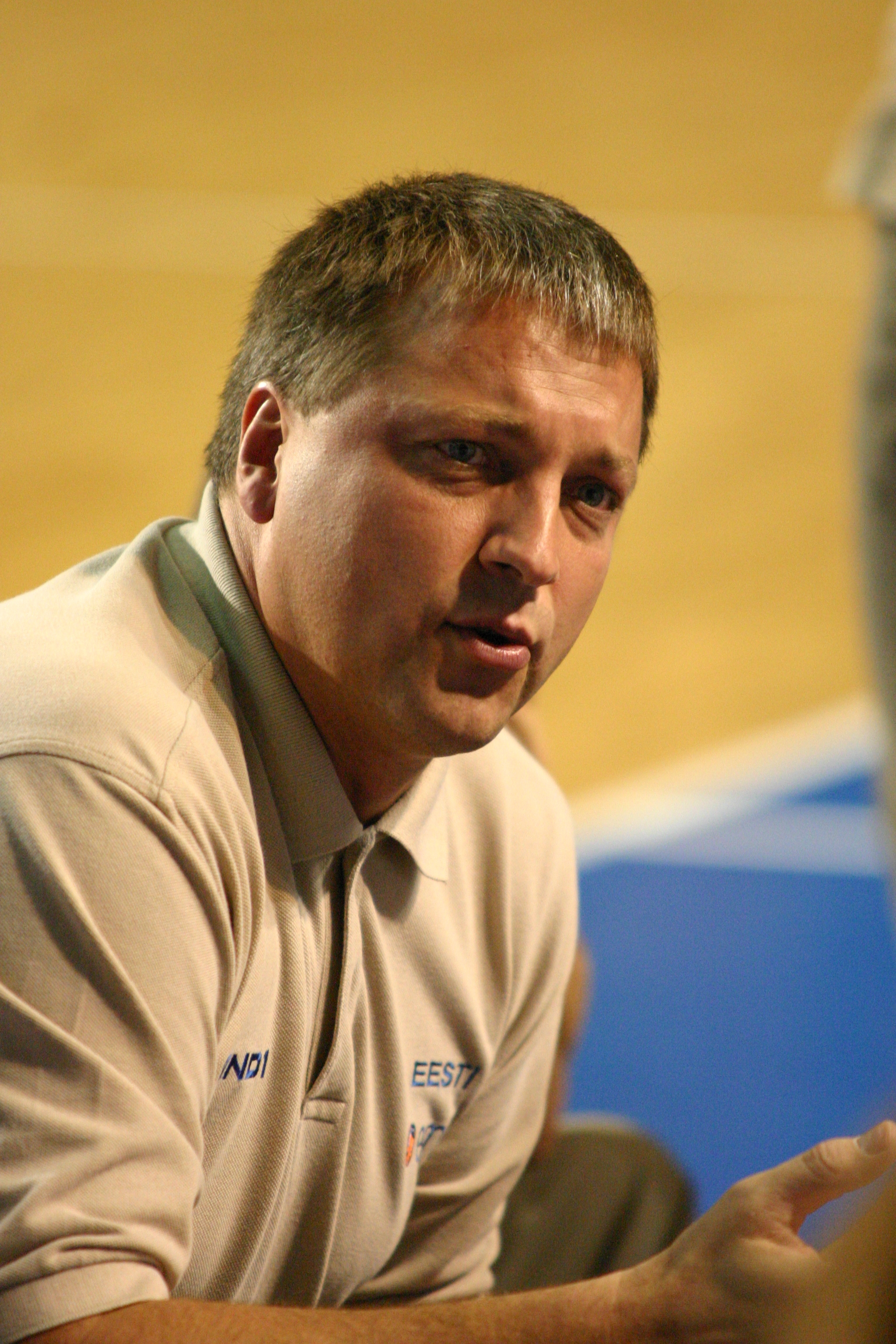
Tiit Sokk coached Estonia from 2004 to 2007 and from 2009 to 2019.

Coached by Tiit Sokk, Estonia qualified for EuroBasket 2015, with preliminary round matches held in Riga, Latvia. Estonia's first two performances were poor as the team suffered heavy defeats in matches against Czech Republic 57–80 and Belgium 55–84. However, the team bounced back with a 78–71 victory over Ukraine, their first EuroBasket victory since 1993. The next game saw Estonia defeated in a close game by Lithuania 62–64. In their final group phase match, Estonia were up against Latvia, which resulted in a 64–75 loss and failing to advance to the knockout stage. Estonia finished the championship in 20th place with a (1–4) record. Gregor Arbet was the team's scoring leader at 11.6 points per game, while Siim-Sander Vene averaged 6.4 rebounds and Sten Sokk contributed 4.2 assists per game.

In qualification for EuroBasket 2017, Estonia won their first two games against, Belarus, and Portugal to put the team at a record of (2–0). However, Estonia dropped three of their final four matches to eliminate the team from qualifying.

After missing their opportunity to reach EuroBasket 2017, Estonia turned their focus toward qualifying for the 2019 FIBA World Cup. The team first went through European Pre-Qualifiers, where they accumulated a (3–1) record during the process, to advance. Entering the first round of European Qualifiers, Estonia split their first four matches for a record of (2–2), before losing their final two games to Great Britain and Greece respectively. Although by defeating Great Britain in their first match of the qualifiers between the two, it proved enough for Estonia to move on to the second and final phase of European qualifiers. There, the team lost their first four games of the round, before managing to salvage their final two matches before being eliminated. In October 2019, the Estonian Basketball Association named Jukka Toijala as the new head coach of the national team.

=== 2020s ===
Estonia competed in the EuroBasket 2022 with group phase games played in Milan, Italy. The team started the tournament with a 62–83 loss to the hosts, followed by two narrow defeats against Ukraine (73–74) and Croatia (70–73). Estonia then won 94–62 against Great Britain before losing to Greece 69–90. The team failed to advance to the round of 16 and finished the tournament in 19th place. Maik-Kalev Kotsar averaged the team-best 12.2 points and 5.6 rebounds per game, while Kerr Kriisa led the team with 5.8 assists per game. On 22 May 2025 Estonia was selected as one of the co-hosts of the EuroBasket 2029, giving Estonia automatic qualification as co-host. Group phase matches will take place in Tallinn at the Unibet Arena.

== Competitive record ==
=== FIBA World Cup ===
World Cup					Qualification		
Year	Position	Pld	W	L	Pld	W	L
(Argentina) 1950	Soviet Occupation				Soviet Occupation		
(Brazil) 1954	Soviet Occupation				Soviet Occupation		
(Chile) 1959	Soviet Occupation				Soviet Occupation		
(Brazil) 1963	Soviet Occupation				Soviet Occupation		
(Uruguay) 1967	Soviet Occupation				Soviet Occupation		
(Socialist Federal Republic of Yugoslavia) 1970	Soviet Occupation				Soviet Occupation		
(Puerto Rico) 1974	Soviet Occupation				Soviet Occupation		
(Philippines) 1978	Soviet Occupation				Soviet Occupation		
(Colombia) 1982	Soviet Occupation				Soviet Occupation		
(Spain) 1986	Soviet Occupation				Soviet Occupation		
(Argentina) 1990	Soviet Occupation				Soviet Occupation		
(Canada) 1994	Did not qualify				EuroBasket served as qualifiers		
(Greece) 1998	Did not qualify				EuroBasket served as qualifiers		
(United States) 2002	Did not qualify				EuroBasket served as qualifiers		
(Japan) 2006	Did not qualify				EuroBasket served as qualifiers		
(Turkey) 2010	Did not qualify				EuroBasket served as qualifiers		
(Spain) 2014	Did not qualify				EuroBasket served as qualifiers		
(China) 2019	Did not qualify				16	7	9
(Philippines) (Japan) (Indonesia) 2023	Did not qualify				12	4	8
(Qatar) 2027	Qualification in progress				8	3	5
(France) 2031	To be determined				To be determined		
Total	0/8				36	14	22

=== Olympic Games ===
Olympic Games					Qualifying		
Year	Position	Pld	W	L	Pld	W	L
(Nazi Germany) 1936	15th	3	1	2			
(United Kingdom) 1948	Soviet Occupation						
(Finland) 1952	Soviet Occupation						
(Australia) 1956	Soviet Occupation						
(Italy) 1960	Soviet Occupation				Soviet Occupation		
(Japan) 1964	Soviet Occupation				Soviet Occupation		
(Mexico) 1968	Soviet Occupation				Soviet Occupation		
(West Germany) 1972	Soviet Occupation				Soviet Occupation		
(Canada) 1976	Soviet Occupation				Soviet Occupation		
(Soviet Union) 1980	Soviet Occupation				Soviet Occupation		
(United States) 1984	Soviet Occupation				Soviet Occupation		
(South Korea) 1988	Soviet Occupation				Soviet Occupation		
(Spain) 1992	Did not qualify				5	2	3
(United States) 1996	Did not qualify				Did not qualify		
(Australia) 2000	Did not qualify				Did not qualify		
(Greece) 2004	Did not qualify				Did not qualify		
(China) 2008	Did not qualify				Did not qualify		
(United Kingdom) 2012	Did not qualify				Did not qualify		
(Brazil) 2016	Did not qualify				Did not qualify		
(Japan) 2020	Did not qualify				Did not qualify		
(France) 2024	Did not qualify				4	2	2
(United States) 2028	To be determined				To be determined		
Total	1/10	3	1	2	9	4	5

=== EuroBasket ===
EuroBasket					Qualification		
Year	Position	Pld	W	L	Pld	W	L
(Switzerland) 1935	Did not enter						
(Latvia) 1937	5th	5	3	2			
(Lithuania) 1939	5th	7	4	3			
(Switzerland) 1946	Soviet Occupation						
(Czechoslovakia) 1947	Soviet Occupation						
(Egypt) 1949	Soviet Occupation						
(France) 1951	Soviet Occupation						
(Soviet Union) 1953	Soviet Occupation						
(Hungary) 1955	Soviet Occupation						
(Bulgaria) 1957	Soviet Occupation						
(Turkey) 1959	Soviet Occupation						
(Socialist Federal Republic of Yugoslavia) 1961	Soviet Occupation						
(Poland) 1963	Soviet Occupation				Soviet Occupation		
(Soviet Union) 1965	Soviet Occupation				Soviet Occupation		
(Finland) 1967	Soviet Occupation				Soviet Occupation		
(Italy) 1969	Soviet Occupation				Soviet Occupation		
(West Germany) 1971	Soviet Occupation				Soviet Occupation		
(Spain) 1973	Soviet Occupation				Soviet Occupation		
(Socialist Federal Republic of Yugoslavia) 1975	Soviet Occupation				Soviet Occupation		
(Belgium) 1977	Soviet Occupation				Soviet Occupation		
(Italy) 1979	Soviet Occupation				Soviet Occupation		
(Czechoslovakia) 1981	Soviet Occupation				Soviet Occupation		
(France) 1983	Soviet Occupation				Soviet Occupation		
(West Germany) 1985	Soviet Occupation				Soviet Occupation		
(Greece) 1987	Soviet Occupation				Soviet Occupation		
(Socialist Federal Republic of Yugoslavia) 1989	Soviet Occupation				Soviet Occupation		
(Italy) 1991	Soviet Occupation				Soviet Occupation		
(Germany) 1993	6th	9	4	5	7	4	3
(Greece) 1995	Did not qualify				10	3	7
(Spain) 1997	Did not qualify				10	4	6
(France) 1999	Did not qualify				10	3	7
(Turkey) 2001	14th	3	0	3	10	7	3
(Sweden) 2003	Did not qualify				10	5	5
(Serbia and Montenegro) 2005	Did not qualify				10	2	8
(Spain) 2007	Did not qualify				10	5	5
(Poland) 2009	Did not qualify				12	2	10
(Lithuania) 2011	Division B				6	4	2
(Slovenia) 2013	Did not qualify				10	6	4
(France) (Croatia) (Germany) (Latvia) 2015	20th	5	1	4	8	5	3
(Finland) (Israel) (Romania) (Turkey) 2017	Did not qualify				6	3	3
(Czech Republic) (Georgia (country)) (Italy) (Germany) 2022	19th	5	1	4	6	2	4
(Cyprus) (Finland) (Poland) (Latvia) 2025	19th	5	1	4	6	4	2
(Estonia) (Greece) (Slovenia) (Spain) 2029	Qualified as co-host				Qualified as co-host		
Total	8/19	39	14	25	131	59	72

== Results and fixtures ==
Win Loss

=== 2025 ===
28 November 2025 2027 FIBA World Cup qualifiers – 1st round	Slovenia	93–94(OT)	Estonia	Koper, Slovenia
19:00 (UTC+1)	Scoring by quarter: 20–19, 18–20, 20–26, 21–14, Overtime: 14–15
	Pts: Hrovat 23; Rebs: Cerkvenik, Omić 6 Asts: Samar 8	Boxscore	Pts: Drell 29; Rebs: Riismaa 8 Asts: Drell 6	Arena: Arena Bonifika; Attendance: 1,570; Referees: Yohan Rosso (FRA), Ventsislav Velkov (BUL), Zdenko Tomašovič (SVK)

1 December 2025 2027 FIBA World Cup qualifiers – 1st round	Estonia	92–97	Czech Republic	Tallinn, Estonia
20:00 (UTC+2)	Scoring by quarter: 29–27, 24–31, 21–22, 18–17
	Pts: Treier 26; Rebs: Konontšuk 5 Asts: Jõesaar 8	Boxscore	Pts: Satoranský 18; Rebs: Peterka, Sehnal 5 Asts: Satoranský 16	Arena: Unibet Arena; Attendance: 6,594; Referees: Martin Horozov (BUL), Zafer Yılmaz (TUR), Silvia Marziali (ITA)

=== 2026 ===
27 February 2026 2027 FIBA World Cup qualifiers – 1st round	Sweden	77–88	Estonia	Stockholm, Sweden
19:00 (UTC+1)	Scoring by quarter: 22–22, 14–24, 22–11, 19–31
	Pts: Håkanson 21; Rebs: Hampton 7 Asts: Håkanson 6	Boxscore	Pts: Drell 23; Rebs: Konontšuk 6 Asts: Suurorg 5	Arena: Avicii Arena; Attendance: 9,364; Referees: Ventsislav Velikov (BUL), Lorenzo Baldini (ITA), Siniša Prpa (SRB)

1 March 2026 2027 FIBA World Cup qualifiers – 1st round	Estonia	69–79	Sweden	Tallinn, Estonia
19:00 (UTC+2)	Scoring by quarter: 22–23, 16–15, 17–13, 14–28
	Pts: Drell 16; Rebs: Jõesaar 6 Asts: Suurorg, Treier 4	Boxscore	Pts: Håkanson 18; Rebs: Bangala 10; Asts: Pantzar 7	Arena: Unibet Arena; Attendance: 6,637; Referees: Mārtiņš Kozlovskis (LAT), Juozas Barkauskas (LTU), Ioannis Tsibouris (GRE)

3 July 2026 2027 FIBA World Cup qualifiers – 1st round	Estonia	93–62	Slovenia	Tallinn, Estonia
19:00 (UTC+3)	Scoring by quarter: 22–16, 24–15, 27–20, 20–11
	Pts: Vaaks 20; Rebs: Kotsar 12; Asts: Kotsar 9	Boxscore	Pts: Hrovat 12; Rebs: Omić 8 Asts: Samar 5	Arena: Unibet Arena; Attendance: 6,958; Referees: Wojciech Liszka (POL), Paulo Marques (POR), Tolga Edis (TUR)

6 July 2026 2027 FIBA World Cup qualifiers – 1st round	Czech Republic	75–73	Estonia	Brno, Czech Republic
17:00 (UTC+2)	Scoring by quarter: 24–20, 17–17, 11–16, 23–20
	Pts: Sehnal 15; Rebs: Peterka 7 Asts: Sehnal 8	Boxscore	Pts: Kotsar, Vaaks 19; Rebs: Kotsar 9 Asts: Vaaks 5	Arena: Starez Aréna Vodova; Attendance: 2,913; Referees: Yohan Rosso (FRA), Georgios Poursanidis (GRE), Roko Hordov (CRO)

27 August 2026 2027 FIBA World Cup qualifiers – 2nd round	Hungary	85–67	Estonia	Miskolc, Hungary
18:00 (UTC+2)	Scoring by quarter: 13–14, 24–20, 26–22, 22–11
	Pts: Perl 22; Rebs: Reuvers 8 Asts: Somogyi 5	Boxscore	Pts: Kullamäe 26; Rebs: Raieste 6 Asts: Suurorg 4	Arena: DVTK Aréna; Attendance: 1,800; Referees: Martin Vulić (CRO), Martin Horozov (BUL), Çisil Güngör (TUR)

30 August 2026 2027 FIBA World Cup qualifiers – 2nd round	Estonia	67–96	Finland	Tallinn, Estonia
19:00 (UTC+3)	Scoring by quarter: 21–21, 14–17, 11–28, 21–30
	Pts: Kullamäe 15; Rebs: three players 5 Asts: Kullamäe 5	Boxscore	Pts: Markkanen 21; Rebs: Markkanen 10; Asts: Nkamhoua 4	Arena: Unibet Arena; Attendance: 7,068; Referees: Petar Pešić (SRB), Yener Yılmaz (TUR), Ioannis Agrafiotis (GRE)

27 November 2026 2027 FIBA World Cup qualifiers – 2nd round	Estonia	vs.	France	Tallinn, Estonia
19:00 (UTC+2)
		Boxscore		Arena: Unibet Arena

30 November 2026 2027 FIBA World Cup qualifiers – 2nd round	Finland	vs.	Estonia	Espoo, Finland
18:30 (UTC+2)
		Boxscore		Arena: Espoo Metro Areena

=== 2027 ===
25 February 2027 2027 FIBA World Cup qualifiers – 2nd round	Estonia	vs.	Hungary	Estonia
--:-- (UTC+2)
		Boxscore

28 February 2027 2027 FIBA World Cup qualifiers – 2nd round	France	vs.	Estonia	France
--:-- (UTC+1)
		Boxscore

== Team ==
=== Current roster ===
Roster for the 2027 FIBA World Cup Qualification matches on 27 and 30 November 2026 against France and Finland.

Estonia men's national basketball team roster
Players
Coaches

Pos.	No.	Name	Age – Date of birth	Height	Club	Ctr.
SF	0	Henri Drell	26 – 25 April 2000	2.06 m (6 ft 9 in)	Neptūnas Klaipeda	(Lithuania)
SF	2	Sander Raieste	27 – 31 March 1999	2.04 m (6 ft 8 in)	UCAM Murcia	(Spain)
PF	3	Kaspar Treier	26 – 19 September 1999	2.04 m (6 ft 8 in)	Movistar Estudiantes	(Spain)
C	9	Matthias Tass	27 – 23 March 1999	2.08 m (6 ft 10 in)	Start Lublin	(Poland)
SF	10	Hugo Toom	23 – 25 October 2002	2.00 m (6 ft 7 in)	Astoria Bydgoszcz	(Poland)
PF	13	Kregor Hermet	29 – 9 June 1997	2.05 m (6 ft 9 in)	JDA Dijon	(France)
C	15	Maik-Kalev Kotsar (C)	29 – 22 December 1996	2.08 m (6 ft 10 in)	Yokohama B-Corsairs	(Japan)
PG	18	Kasper Suurorg	24 – 27 May 2002	2.00 m (6 ft 7 in)	Arka Gdynia	(Poland)
SG	21	Janari Jõesaar	32 – 8 December 1993	1.98 m (6 ft 6 in)	Start Lublin	(Poland)
SG	25	Joonas Riismaa	24 – 6 March 2002	1.99 m (6 ft 6 in)	Dinamo Sassari	(Italy)
F	34	Artur Konontšuk	26 – 9 May 2000	2.00 m (6 ft 7 in)	Rostock Seawolves	(Germany)
F	35	Markus Ilver	24 – 12 January 2002	2.05 m (6 ft 9 in)	Legia Warsaw	(Poland)
PG	77	Kristian Kullamäe	27 – 25 May 1999	1.94 m (6 ft 4 in)	U-BT Cluj-Napoca	(Romania)

Head coach

- (Estonia) Heiko Rannula

Assistant coach(es)

- (Estonia) Indrek Reinbok
- (Estonia) Kristjan Kangur
- (Estonia) Brett Nõmm

Legend

- (C) Team captain
- Club – describes last
  club before the competition
- Age – describes age
  on 27 August 2026

=== Depth chart ===
Pos.	Starting 5	Bench 1	Bench 2
C	Maik-Kalev Kotsar	Matthias Tass
PF	Artur Konontšuk	Kaspar Treier	Kregor Hermet
SF	Henri Drell	Markus Ilver	Hugo Toom
SG	Sander Raieste	Janari Jõesaar	Joonas Riismaa
PG	Kristian Kullamäe	Kasper Suurorg	Martin Paasoja

=== Recent call-ups ===
Current notable players who have played for the national team:

Players previously called up roster
Players
Coaches

Pos.	No.	Name	Age – Date of birth	Height	Club	Ctr.
PG	1	Märt Rosenthal	27 – 15 March 1999	1.91 m (6 ft 3 in)	Tartu Ülikool	(Estonia)
PG	4	Erik Makke	21 – 5 April 2005	1.88 m (6 ft 2 in)	Stephen F. Austin Lumberjacks	(United States)
PG	5	Siim-Markus Post	29 – 13 February 1997	1.84 m (6 ft 0 in)	TalTech	(Estonia)
G	7	Mikk Jurkatamm	25 – 18 September 2000	1.95 m (6 ft 5 in)	VL Pesaro	(Italy)
PF	8	Mihkel Kirves	29 – 6 December 1996	2.00 m (6 ft 7 in)	BC Pärnu	(Estonia)
PF	11	Siim-Sander Vene	35 – 12 November 1990	2.03 m (6 ft 8 in)	Free agent
SF	12	Gregor Kuuba	22 – 8 October 2003	2.00 m (6 ft 7 in)	Bigbank/Kalev	(Estonia)
SG	16	Stefan Vaaks	21 – 8 May 2005	1.98 m (6 ft 6 in)	Illinois Fighting Illini	(United States)
SG	23	Leemet Böckler	25 – 7 April 2001	1.98 m (6 ft 6 in)	Górnik Wałbrzych	(Poland)
PF	31	Henri Veesaar	22 – 28 March 2004	2.13 m (7 ft 0 in)	Atlanta Hawks	(United States)
PG	40	Martin Paasoja	33 – 4 January 1993	1.90 m (6 ft 3 in)	Tartu Ülikool	(Estonia)
PF	99	Karl Johan Lips	29 – 20 July 1996	2.00 m (6 ft 7 in)	Stal Ostrow Wielkopolski	(Poland)

Legend

- Age – describes age
  on 1 July 2026
- Club – describes last
  club

== Coaches ==
Coach	Period	Competition	Result
(Estonia) Herbert Niiler	1929–1940	1936 Olympic Games	9th
(Estonia) Herbert Niiler	1929–1940	1937 EuroBasket	5th
(Estonia) Herbert Niiler	1929–1940	1939 EuroBasket	5th
(Estonia) Jaanus Levkoi	1991–1992		
(Estonia) Jaak Salumets	1993–1997	1993 EuroBasket	6th
(Netherlands) Maarten van Gent	1997–1999		
(Estonia) Üllar Kerde	1999–2001	2001 EuroBasket	14th
(Estonia) Heino Enden	2001–2004		
(Estonia) Tiit Sokk	2004–2007		
(Estonia) Üllar Kerde	2007–2009		
(Estonia) Tiit Sokk	2009–2019	2015 EuroBasket	20th
(Finland) Jukka Toijala	2019–2024	2022 EuroBasket	19th
(Estonia) Heiko Rannula	2024–	2025 EuroBasket	19th

== Past rosters ==
1936 Olympic Games: finished 9th among 23 teams

3 Erich Altosaar, 4 Artur Amon, 5 Aleksander Illi, 6 Vladimir Kärk, 8 Robert Keres, 9 Evald Mahl, 10 Aleksander Margiste, 11 Bernhard Nooni, 12 Leonid Saar, 13 Heino Veskila, 14 Georg Vinogradov (Coach: Herbert Niiler)

1937 EuroBasket: finished 5th among 8 teams

3 Oskar Erikson, 4 Aleksander Illi, 5 Vladimir Kärk, 6 Robert Keres, 7 Evald Mahl, 8 Albert Suurna, 9 Heino Veskila, 10 Ralf Viksten, 11 Alfred Zimmermann (Coach: Herbert Niiler)

1939 EuroBasket: finished 5th among 8 teams

3 Valdeko Valdmäe, 4 Oskar Erikson, 5 Herbert Tillemann, 6 Ralf Viksten, 7 Georg Vinogradov, 8 Artur Amon, 9 Hans Juurup, 10 Erich Altosaar, 11 Heino Veskila, 13 Evald Mahl (Coach: Herbert Niiler)

1993 EuroBasket: finished 6th among 16 teams

4 Toomas Kandimaa, 5 Aivar Kuusmaa, 6 Erki Kivinukk, 7 Ivo Saksakulm, 8 Margus Metstak, 9 Andrus Nagel, 10 Indrek Rumma, 11 Sergei Babenko, 12 Marek Noormets, 13 Aleksandr Karavajev, 14 Gert Kullamäe, 15 Rauno Pehka (Coach: Jaak Salumets)

2001 EuroBasket: finished 14th among 16 teams

4 Tanel Tein, 5 Indrek Varblane, 6 Toomas Kandimaa, 7 Valmo Kriisa, 8 Margus Metstak, 9 Andre Pärn, 10 Indrek Rumma, 11 Tarmo Kikerpill, 12 Marek Noormets, 13 Martin Müürsepp, 14 Toomas Liivak, 15 Rauno Pehka (Coach: Üllar Kerde)

2015 EuroBasket: finished 20th among 24 teams

4 Rain Veideman, 5 Tanel Sokk, 6 Gert Dorbek, 7 Sten Sokk, 8 Janar Talts, 9 Gregor Arbet, 10 Erik Keedus, 11 Siim-Sander Vene, 13 Joosep Toome, 14 Kristjan Kangur, 15 Reinar Hallik, 20 Tanel Kurbas (Coach: Tiit Sokk)

2022 EuroBasket: finished 19th among 24 teams

0 Henri Drell, 2 Sander Raieste, 7 Sten Sokk, 9 Matthias Tass, 11 Siim-Sander Vene, 15 Maik-Kalev Kotsar, 20 Rauno Nurger, 21 Janari Jõesaar, 22 Martin Dorbek, 33 Kristjan Kitsing, 44 Kerr Kriisa, 77 Kristian Kullamäe (Coach: Jukka Toijala)

2025 EuroBasket: finished 19th among 24 teams

0 Henri Drell, 1 Märt Rosenthal, 2 Sander Raieste, 3 Kaspar Treier, 7 Mikk Jurkatamm, 9 Matthias Tass, 11 Siim-Sander Vene, 13 Kregor Hermet, 21 Janari Jõesaar, 25 Joonas Riismaa, 34 Artur Konontšuk, 77 Kristian Kullamäe (Coach: Heiko Rannula)

== See also ==
- Sport in Estonia
- Estonia women's national basketball team
- Estonia men's national under-20 basketball team
- Estonia men's national under-18 basketball team
- Estonia men's national under-16 basketball team
- Estonia men's national 3x3 team
