= EuroBasket 2029 =

International basketball event

2029. aasta Euroopa meistrivõistlused korvpallis; (in Estonian) Ευρωπαϊκό Πρωτάθλημα Καλαθοσφαίρισης 2029 (in Greek) Evropsko prvenstvo v košarki 2029 (in Slovene) Campeonato Europeo de Baloncesto 2029 (in Spanish)

Tournament details
- Host countries: Estonia; Greece; Slovenia; Spain
- Dates: 4–21 September
- Teams: 24
- Venues: 5 (in 4 host cities)

The EuroBasket 2029 will be the 43rd edition of the EuroBasket championship, the quadrennial international men's basketball championship organized by FIBA Europe.

Like the previous four editions, the tournament will be co-hosted by multiple countries; Estonia, Greece, Slovenia and Spain. It will take place from 4 to 21 September 2029.

Germany are the defending champions.

== Bidding process ==
On 22 March 2024, FIBA Europe announced that the bidding process would begin later in 2024, with a deadline for submitting bids being 29 November. There were three options for hosting: to host a preliminary group, to host the final round or to host the entire tournament. The 2015, 2017, 2022 and 2025 editions tendered in the same way, with each of these tournaments hosted by four countries.

On 4 December, FIBA announced that eight countries applied to host the tournament.

=== Final bids ===
Winning bids are marked in bold.

- **Estonia** (at the Unibet Arena in Tallinn)
- **Greece** (at the Telekom Center Athens in Athens)
- Lithuania (at the Žalgiris Arena in Kaunas)
- **Slovenia** (at the Arena Stožice in Ljubljana)
- Netherlands (at the Ahoy Arena in Rotterdam)
- **Spain** (at the Movistar Arena in Madrid)

=== Withdrawn bids ===
- Finland (venue unknown, either in Helsinki or Tampere)
- Germany (at the SAP Garden in Munich)

On 22 May 2025, Estonia, Greece, Slovenia and Spain were selected as hosts at the FIBA Europe Board meeting in Riga, Latvia, with the Spanish capital Madrid set to provide the backdrop for the Final Phase.

== Venues ==
Athens	EuroBasket 2029 (Europe)	
Telekom Center Athens	EuroBasket 2029 (Europe)	
Capacity: 18,300	EuroBasket 2029 (Europe)	
Ljubljana	EuroBasket 2029 (Europe)	
Arena Stožice	EuroBasket 2029 (Europe)	
Capacity: 12,480	EuroBasket 2029 (Europe)	
Tallinn	Madrid	
Unibet Arena	Santiago Bernabéu Stadium	Movistar Arena
Capacity: 7,200	Capacity: 78,287 (Note: Opening match only)	Capacity: 15,000

== Draw ==
The draw will take place in Madrid, Spain sometime in 2029.

Each of the four hosts (Estonia, Greece, Slovenia and Spain) will grant the right to select a partner federation for commercial and marketing criteria. These teams were automatically placed into the same group as their chosen partner country.

== Qualification ==
The qualifiers will begin in February 2028 and end in February 2029. Estonia, Greece, Slovenia and Spain automatically qualified as co-hosts.

=== Qualified teams ===
Team	Qualification method	Date of qualification	Appearance(s)				Previous best performance (Note: Bold text indicates they hosted that edition.)	WR (Note: World ranking at start of tournament.)
Team	Qualification method	Date of qualification	Total	First	Last	Streak	Previous best performance	WR
Estonia	Host nation	22 May 2025	8th	1937	2025	3	Fifth place (1937, 1939)	TBD
Greece	Host nation	22 May 2025	30th	1949	2025	19	Champions (1987, 2005)	TBD
Slovenia	Host nation	22 May 2025	16th	1993	2025	16	Champions (2017)	TBD
Spain	Host nation	22 May 2025	34th	1935	2025	33	Champions (2009, 2011, 2015, 2022)	TBD
