= Georg Vinogradov =

Estonian basketball player

Personal information
- Born: 15 May 1915 Pavlovsk, Russian Empire
- Died: 21 January 2011 (aged 95) Montreal, Canada

Georg Vinogradov (18 April 1915 – 12 January 2011) was a Russian-born Estonian basketball player.

Vinogradov was born in the town of Pavlovsk near Saint Petersburg, then capital city of Russia. After emigrating with his family to Estonia, Vinogradov attended schools in Tallinn; he graduated from the Russian Gymnasium in 1933, Russia. After emigrating with his family to Estonia, Vinogradov attended schools in Tallinn. He graduated from the Russian Gymnasium in 1933, then enrolled at the University of Tartu in 1935 to study economics. He began playing basketball under coaches Alexei Selenoi and Herbert Niiler. He competed mainly on the Russ and ÜENÜTO teams, and from 1936 until 1939, on the Estonia men's national basketball team. He was a member of the Estonian team at the 1936 Summer Olympics in Berlin but did not play in any games.

Vinogradov won 5th place at the European Basketball Championship in 1939, won a silver medal and bronze medal in 1937 at the World Student Games, and silver medal in volleyball in 1939. He was a member of the board of the Estonian Handball Association in 1944.

During World War II, Vinogradov escaped the 1944 Soviet invasion of Estonia and became a refugee in Sweden. In 1949, he moved on to Canada, and later settled there permanently. He died in Montreal, Canada in 2011, aged 95. He is buried in Mount Royal Cemetery in Montreal.
