= Valdeko Valdmäe =

Estonian basketball and volleyball player

Valdeko Valdmäe (until 1937 Valdeko Velt; 5 May 1913 – 20 May 2001) was an Estonian basketball and volleyball player.

He was born in Tartu. He studied economy at the University of Tartu.

He began his basketball career under the guidance of Herbert Niiler. He played in several clubs: Tartu NMKÜ, Tallinna Kalev, Tartu Kalev. He was a member of Estonian national basketball team.

Following the reoccupation and annexation of Estonia by the Soviet Union In 1944, he fled to Germany where he stayed at Geislingen displaced persons camp. Later he moved to Australia.

He is buried at Sydney's Rookwood Cemetery.
