= Alo Suurna =

Estonian basketball player (1913–2008)

Alo Suurna (until 1936 Albert Schultz; 9 May 1913 – 8 December 2008) was an Estonian basketball player.

He was born in Tartu. 1934–1935 he studied forestry, and 1935–1938 economy at Tartu University.

He began playing basketball in 1928, coached by Herbert Niiler. He played at the club Tartu NMKÜ, which won Estonian championships in 1934, 1936 and 1937.

1939 he was basketball coach in Finland, and was also a member of Finland men's national basketball team. In 1944 he moved to Sweden.

He also played volleyball (in 1934 he was a winner of the Estonian championships).
