= Jaak Salumets =

Estonian basketball player and coach

Personal information
- Born: January 30, 1949 (age 77) Paide, then part of Estonian SSR, Soviet Union
- Listed height: 6 ft 4 in (1.93 m)

Career information
- Playing career: 1967–1979
- Position: Forward

Career history

Playing
- 1968–1979: Kalev

Coaching
- 1985–1991: Kalev
- 1991–1993: Namika Lahti
- 1993–1994: Žalgiris Kaunas
- 1994–1997: Kalev
- 1997–1998: Nybit
- 1993–1997: Estonia

Career highlights
- As player: Estonian SSR Champion (1968, 1971); As head coach: 2× Estonian League champion (1995, 1996); Lithuanian champion (1994); USSR League champion (1991)
Medals
Men's basketball
Representing Soviet Union
EuroBasket
| Bronze medal – third place | Spain 1973 | USSR |

Jaak Salumets (born 30 January 1949 in Paide) is an Estonian retired professional basketball player and coach who played mostly at the forward position. Salumets is also a former Estonian Reform Party politician who was a member of the Riigikogu (Estonian parliament) from 2007 to 2011.

== Early life and career ==
Jaak Salumets was born in Paide and started his basketball career in his hometown. Soon he was discovered by basketball coaches in TPI (present day TTÜ) and made his way through to the Soviet youth team and Tallinn Kalev. In 1968 he won the European Junior Championships with the national team, scoring 33 points in the final against Yugoslavia and deserved the attention of senior team coaches. Two years later he was invited to the senior team by Alexander Gomelsky, but then 19-year-old Jaak refused, explaining the decision as "I was too young and wanted to concentrate on studies". Gomelsky understood this as a personal insult and Salumets did not receive any opportunities to play under Gomelsky's led Soviet Union national basketball team anymore. In 1970, Estonian SSR managed to take a historical win over Team USA. Jaak Salumets scored 25 points against latter NBA star Julius Erving. The Estonian considers this as his best game he ever played.

== National team and Tallinna Kalev ==
Even though he did not have a chance to play under Alexander Gomelsky anymore, he made the breakthrough when Vladimir Kondrashin was appointed as the head coach of the national team, the once rejected Estonian was given an opportunity. He was in the shortlist for the 1972 Olympic team, but was replaced with Gennadi Volnov. Salumets finally won his first and last prize, bronze medal in EuroBasket 1973. After the only major tournament he got in conflict with the new head coach as well and was ruled out of the national team permanently.

== Final years and coaching ==
Jaak Salumets did not win anything spectacular, besides playing in the top flight of the Soviet basketball. In 1979 Salumets concluded his career as a player and took a break from professional basketball. 6 years later, in 1985 he became the head coach of Tallinn Kalev, his former team, which struggled to show decent results in both Soviet and Estonian SSR championships. With the new coach Kalev improved his game and won surprisingly the last Soviet basketball championships held, in 1991. The team consisted of players like Olympic champion Tiit Sokk, latter Panathinaikos B.C. shooter Aivar Kuusmaa, Gert Kullamäe, and George Jackson, the first and also last American player in the Soviet Union basketball league. Shortly after the great triumph he was offered to become the mentor of Soviet Union national basketball team and BC Avtodor Saratov.

The years following dissolution of the Soviet Union Salumets moved abroad to coach Finnish BC NMKY Lahti, but he also became the coach of the Estonia national basketball team, who reached 6th place at the EuroBasket 1993. After successful summer with the national team he was contracted by Lithuanian giant BC Žalgiris and achieved first place for newly recognized Lithuanian Basketball League. However, it was a one-year spell with the 'Grunwald' and Salumets moved back to Estonia to his last stint with Kalev. He managed to contract the biggest prospect of Estonia, Martin Müürsepp, who had been in contract with European powerhouse Maccabi Tel Aviv, for the 1995–96 season. This is believed to be last big success for Jaak Salumets as a coach, as Kalev won the prestigious Haarlem Basketball Week tournament. In the way to the win, Estonian champions defeated Australia national basketball team in final-four, who reached the semi-final at the 1996 Summer Olympics following year and PBC CSKA Moscow in the grand final. The same season Martin Müürsepp was drafted by Utah Jazz to the NBA and went on to represent teams such as Miami Heat (traded from Jazz), Dallas Mavericks and CSKA Moscow.

From 2016 to 2020, Salumets was the president of the Estonian Basketball Association.

== Achievements with club ==
Kalev Tallinn

- Soviet Union League Champion: 1991
- Soviet Estonian Championship: 1968, 1971
- Estonian Championship: 1995, 1996

Žalgiris Kaunas

- Lithuanian Championship: 1994
