= Maik Kotsar =

Estonian basketball player

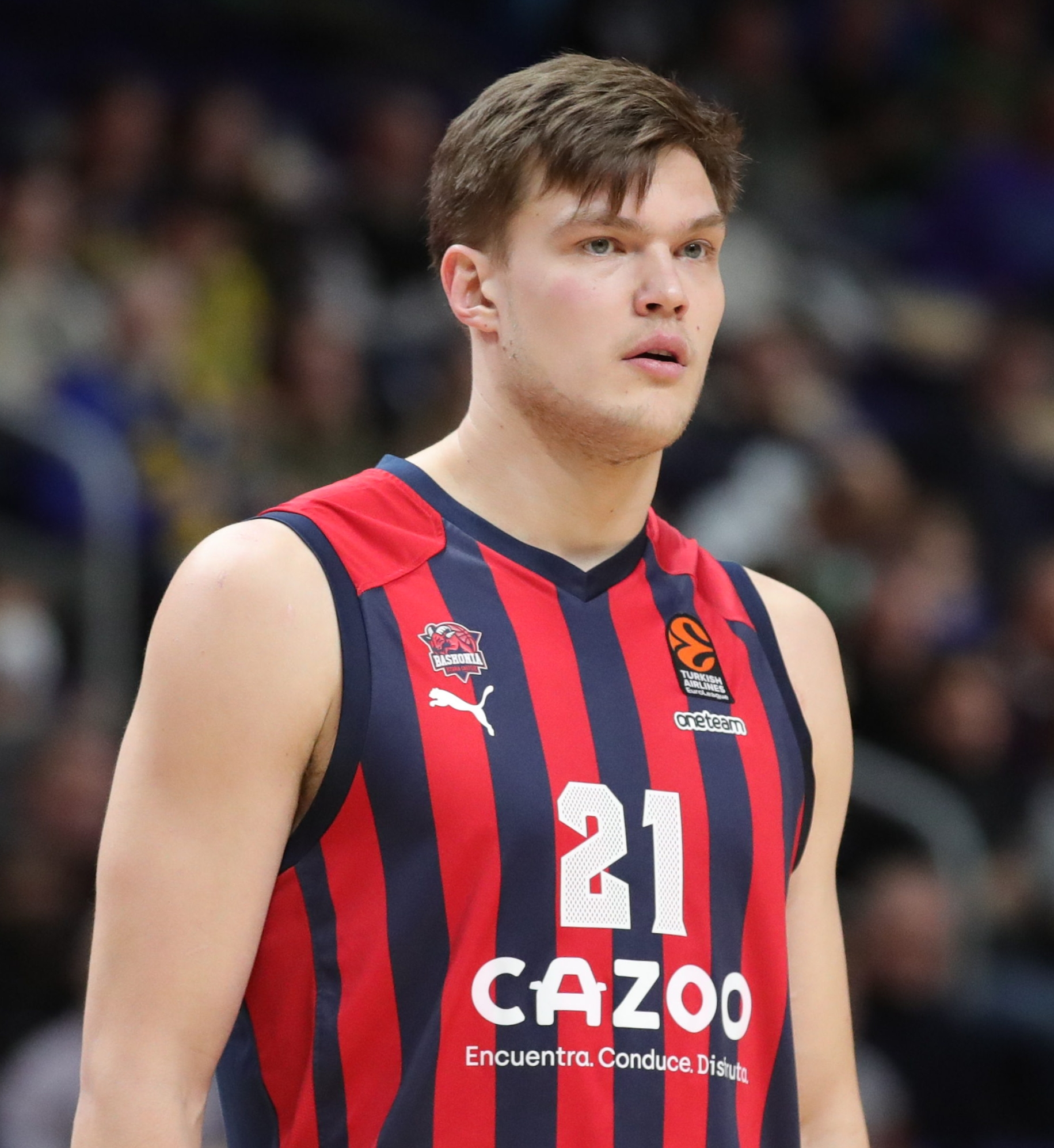
- Kotsar with Baskonia in 2023

No. 21 – Yokohama B-Corsairs
- Position: Center
- League: B.League

Personal information
- Born: 22 December 1996 (age 29) Tallinn, Estonia
- Listed height: 2.11 m (6 ft 11 in)
- Listed weight: 122.5 kg (270 lb)

Career information
- High school: Audentes Sports Gymnasium (Tallinn, Estonia); Sunrise Christian Academy (Bel Aire, Kansas)
- College: South Carolina (2016–2020)
- NBA draft: 2020: undrafted
- Playing career: 2015–present

Career history
- 2011–2015: Audentes
- 2020–2022: Hamburg Towers
- 2022–2024: Baskonia
- 2024–present: Yokohama B-Corsairs

Career highlights
- All-Bundesliga First Team (2022); All-Bundesliga Second Team (2021); Second-team All-SEC (2020)

Maik-Kalev Kotsar (born 22 December 1996) is an Estonian professional basketball player for the Yokohama B-Corsairs of the Japanese B.League. He played two seasons for Saski Baskonia of the Spanish Liga ACB and the EuroLeague. He played college basketball for South Carolina Gamecocks. Kotsar has played for the Estonia men's national 3x3 team. Listed at 6 feet 11 inches (2.11 m) and 270 pounds (122 kg), he plays the center position. He also represents the Estonian national basketball team internationally.

== College career ==
On 7 March 2016, Kotsar committed to play for the South Carolina Gamecocks. In his freshman year, Kotsar saw action in all 37 games with 33 starts, averaging 5.8 points and 4.8 rebounds per game as South Carolina advanced to its first-ever Final Four, losing 73–77 to Gonzaga. Kotsar earned second-team All-SEC honors after averaging 11.2 points, 6.3 rebounds, 2.3 assists, 1.5 steals and 1.1 blocks per game during his senior season.

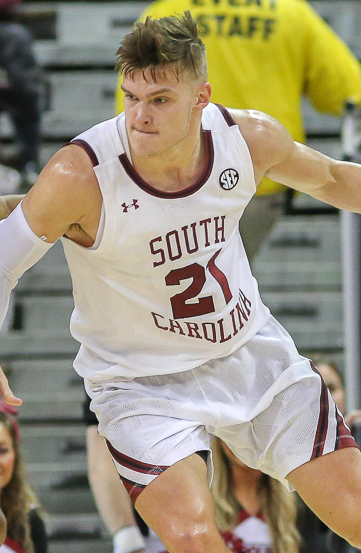
Kotsar playing for South Carolina in March 2020

Maik Kotsar attended the University of South Carolina's Darla Moore School of Business. He majored in Finance and minored in Management. By the time of his graduation he had been named to the President's List, was on the Athletics Director's Honor Roll and had been named to the SEC Honor Roll all four years, and was named to the NABC (National Association of Basketball Coaches) Honors Court. Possibly his most notable academic achievement came his senior year when he was named University of South Carolina's Male Scholar Athlete of the Year. This award is given each year to one graduating senior with exceptional and outstanding academic achievement.

== Professional career ==
On 16 August 2020, Kotsar signed with the Hamburg Towers of the Basketball Bundesliga. In both seasons with the Hamburg side, he averaged 14.2 points per game in Bundesliga play.

On 25 July 2022, he put pen to paper on a deal with Saski Baskonia of the Spanish Liga ACB. Kotsar recorded 21 points, 9 rebounds, 4 assists and 1 block in his EuroLeague debut in Baskonia's 81–71 victory over Valencia. With the PIR of 31, he became the MVP of the first round. His second MVP of the round came from a 93–87 victory over ALBA Berlin on 28 March 2023 recording 23 points, 10 rebounds, 2 assists, 2 blocks and a PIR of 40.

In July 2024, Kotsar moved to Japan after signing with Yokohama B-Corsairs in the B.League 1. He will reunite with his former national team coach Jukka Toijala.

== National team career ==
Kotsar made his debut for the Estonian national team on 29 June 2018, in a 2019 FIBA Basketball World Cup qualifier against Great Britain, scoring 8 points in a 65–74 away defeat.

== 3x3 ==
Kotsar's 3x3 career started in the U18 division in 2013 with the Sprite Streetball 2013 Tallinn tournament where he advanced to the U18 Estonia Finals and eventually the 2013 FIBA 3x3 World Championships on September 26, 2013. Kotsar continued to compete 3x3 through 2014 and 2015. His FIBA 3x3 career returned from hiatus in 2018 Ghetto Basket Pro Camp in Riga on May 10 of that year. His team would advance all the way to the FIBA 3x3 World Cup tournament. Kotsar's Estonia Men's 3x3 team would be defeated by the Poland national 3x3 team who would themselves go on to win 3rd place in the entire tournament after being eliminated in the semifinals. The Estonian 3x3 Men's Team's run came to an end at the preliminary stage pools at 3rd place of the 2018 FIBA 3x3 World Cup – Men's tournament and they took home 9th place.

== Career statistics ==
Legend
GP	Games played	GS	Games started	MPG	Minutes per game
FG%	Field-goal percentage	3P%	3-point field-goal percentage	FT%	Free-throw percentage
RPG	Rebounds per game	APG	Assists per game	SPG	Steals per game
BPG	Blocks per game	PPG	Points per game	PIR	Performance index rating
**Bold**	Career high

=== EuroLeague ===
Year	Team	GP	GS	MPG	FG%	3P%	FT%	RPG	APG	SPG	BPG	PPG	PIR
2022–23	Baskonia	34	28	**20.25**	**.658**	—	0.575	**4.3**	**1.4**	**0.7**	**0.4**	**9.3**	**13.3**
2023–24	Baskonia	**39**	**29**	18.05	.518	—	**0.687**	3.3	1.2	**0.7**	0.3	5.6	7.8
Career		73	57	19.10	.588	—	0.631	3.8	1.3	0.7	0.3	7.3	10.4

=== EuroCup ===
Year	Team	GP	GS	MPG	FG%	3P%	FT%	RPG	APG	SPG	BPG	PPG	PIR
2021–22	Hamburg Towers	16	6	26.8	.604	—	.667	6.6	1.4	1.2	0.3	13.4	17.2
Career		16	6	26.8	.604	—	.667	6.6	1.4	1.2	0.3	13.4	17.2

=== Domestic leagues ===
Year	Team	League	GP	MPG	FG%	3P%	FT%	RPG	APG	SPG	BPG	PPG
2020–21	(Germany) Hamburg Towers	BBL	36	29.3	.577	.000	.727	6.6	1.7	1.1	.3	14.8
2021–22	(Germany) Hamburg Towers	BBL	34	27.6	.613	.000	.671	7.6	1.9	.8	.2	14.2
2022–23	(Spain) Baskonia	ACB	34	20.3	.614	.000	.718	5.0	1.5	.7	.3	9.3
2023–24	(Spain) Baskonia	ACB	33	17.6	.585	.333	.612	3.2	1.3	.6	.2	6.5

=== College ===
Year	Team	GP	GS	MPG	FG%	3P%	FT%	RPG	APG	SPG	BPG	PPG
2016–17	South Carolina	**37**	**33**	23.9	.490	—	.396	4.8	.7	.7	.4	5.8
2017–18	South Carolina	33	**33**	26.5	.426	.222	.566	4.8	1.4	.9	.5	8.0
2018–19	South Carolina	30	24	23.4	.438	**.500**	.443	4.7	.9	1.0	.9	6.7
2019–20	South Carolina	31	31	**30.5**	**.497**	.000	**.690**	**6.3**	**2.3**	**1.5**	**1.1**	**11.2**
Career		131	121	26.0	.464	.265	.541	5.1	1.3	1.0	.7	7.8

=== National team ===
Team	Tournament	Pos.	GP	PPG	RPG	APG
Estonia	EuroBasket 2022	19th	5	12.2	5.6	2.0
