= Leonid Saar =

Estonian sportsperson (1913–2010)

Leonid Saar (15 February 1913, in Mõisaküla – 26 January 2010, in Bogart, Georgia) was an Estonian basketball player, ice hockey player, and footballer. He competed in the 1936 Summer Olympics on the Estonia men's national basketball team.

Saar studied at the University of Tartu's Faculty of Law between 1934 and 1943. Saar initially played football for Tallinna SK Siirius and in 1938 and 1942, was part of the team that were the winners of the Estonian Cup. He later trained and played ice hockey under the supervision of Heinrich Paal. Saar was a member of the Estonia men's national ice hockey team eight times, and both the Estonia men's national basketball team and Estonia national football team twice.

Following the Soviet occupation of Estonia in 1944, Saar fled to Sweden, then to Canada in 1951. He later settled in the United States.
