= Evald Mahl =

Estonian basketball player

Personal information
- Born: 14 April 1915 Tartu, Governorate of Livonia, Russian Empire
- Died: 18 January 2001 (aged 85) Des Moines, United States

Evald Mahl (14 April 1915 – 18 January 2001) was an Estonian basketball player. He competed in the 1936 Summer Olympics.

Mahl was born in Tartu, in the Governorate of Livonia of the Russian Empire (now Estonia), the son of Peeter and Pauline (née Martin) Mahl. He began playing basketball in 1927. He was the 1934, 1936, 1937, and 1944 Estonian national basketball champion. He also competed in volleyball at the 1934 Estonian Masters and competed in baseball and athletics. During World War II, he fled Estonia for Germany. Mahl later moved to Canada before settling in the United States. He lived in Des Moines from 1951 onward. He is buried at Glendale Cemetery in Des Moines, Iowa.
