= Matthias Tass =

Estonian basketball player

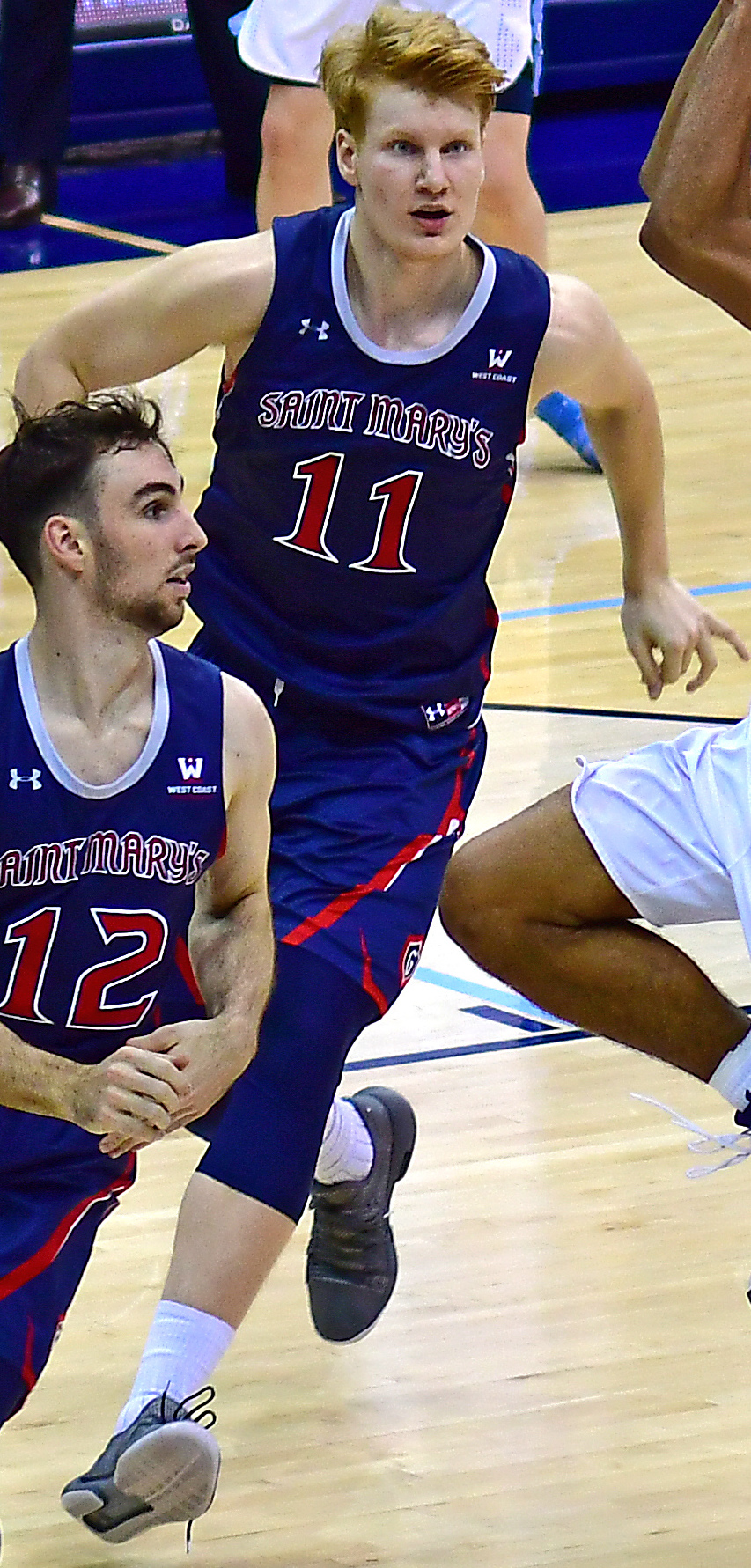
- Tass with the Saint Mary's Gaels in 2019

No. 13 – Start Lublin
- Position: Power forward / center
- League: PLK

Personal information
- Born: 23 March 1999 (age 27) Tallinn, Estonia
- Listed height: 2.08 m (6 ft 10 in)
- Listed weight: 111 kg (245 lb)

Career information
- High school: Audentes Sports Gymnasium (Tallinn, Estonia)
- College: Saint Mary's (2018–2022)
- NBA draft: 2022: undrafted
- Playing career: 2016–present

Career history
- 2016–2017: BC Kalev
- 2017–2018: TTÜ
- 2022: Aquila Basket Trento
- 2022: →MKS Dąbrowa Górnicza
- 2022–2023: Baxi Manresa
- 2023–2025: Filou Oostende
- 2025–2026: Legia Warsaw
- 2026–present: Start Lublin

Career highlights
- Polish League champion (2026); 2× Belgian League champion (2024, 2025); Belgian Cup winner (2025); BNXT League champion (2024); Estonian League champion (2017); Estonian Cup winner (2016); Estonian League Best Young Player (2018); First-team All-WCC (2022)
Medals
Men's basketball
Representing Estonia
FIBA Europe U-16 Championship Division B
Gold medal – first place	2015 Bulgaria	U16 Team
FIBA Europe U-18 Championship Division B
Bronze medal – third place	2017 Estonia	U18 Team

Matthias Tass (born 23 March 1999) is an Estonian basketball player for Start Lublin of the Polish Basketball League (PLK). Standing at 2.08 m (6 ft 10 in), he plays at the power forward and center positions. He played college basketball for the Saint Mary's Gaels.

== College career ==
His second season in college was cut short as a result of a torn ACL in right knee in December 2019. Coming into his junior season, Tass was named to the Preseason All-West Coast Conference team. He averaged 10.9 points and 5.3 rebounds per game as a junior. As a senior, Tass was named first-team All-West Coast Conference.

== Professional career ==
He has played for TTÜ of the Korvpalli Meistriliiga (KML) and the Baltic Basketball League (BBL). Before joining TTÜ in December 2017 he played for Estonian champions Kalev/Cramo.

On August 14, 2022, he has signed with Aquila Basket Trento of the LBA. On August 20, 2022, Tass joined MKS Dąbrowa Górnicza of the Polish Basketball League on loan.

On November 13, 2022, he signed with Baxi Manresa of the Liga ACB.

On July 10, 2025, he signed with Legia Warsaw of the Polish Basketball League (PLK).

On June 25, 2026, he signed with Start Lublin of the Polish Basketball League (PLK).

== Career statistics ==
Legend
GP	Games played	GS	Games started	MPG	Minutes per game
FG%	Field goal percentage	3P%	3-point field goal percentage	FT%	Free throw percentage
RPG	Rebounds per game	APG	Assists per game	SPG	Steals per game
BPG	Blocks per game	PPG	Points per game	**Bold**	Career high

=== College ===
Year	Team	GP	GS	MPG	FG%	3P%	FT%	RPG	APG	SPG	BPG	PPG
2018–19	Saint Mary's	**34**	0	14.8	.495	**.250**	.667	3.1	.6	.5	.3	3.7
2019–20	Saint Mary's	14	13	23.4	.534	–	.750	3.6	**2.2**	.6	**1.3**	6.6
2020–21	Saint Mary's	24	24	**29.3**	.509	.222	.617	5.3	1.7	**.7**	.8	10.9
2021–22	Saint Mary's	**34**	**34**	28.9	**.559**	.111	**.796**	**6.1**	2.1	.5	.7	**12.6**
Career		106	71	23.7	.532	.182	.724	4.7	1.5	.5	.7	8.6

=== Domestic leagues ===
Season	Team	League	GP	MPG	FG%	3P%	FT%	RPG	APG	SPG	BPG	PPG
2016–17	Kalev/Cramo	KML	13	12.0	.531	.200	.765	2.4	.7	.0	.5	4.9
2017–18	Kalev/Cramo	KML	4	17.8	.273	.167	1.000	4.3	1.5	.3	1.0	5.3
2017–18	TTÜ	KML	15	28.1	.444	.314	.615	6.5	1.5	.9	1.8	12.8

=== National team ===
Team	Tournament	Pos.	GP	PPG	RPG	APG
Estonia	EuroBasket 2022	19th	5	1.8	1.6	1.0
Estonia	EuroBasket 2025	19th	5	7.2	4.0	1.8

=== Estonian national youth teams ===
Year	Tournament	National Team	GP	GS	MPG	FG%	3P%	FT%	RPG	APG	SPG	BPG	PPG
2014	2014 FIBA Europe Under-16 Championship Division B	Estonia U-16	9	0	17.1	.455	.000	.250	4.3	.6	.9	.8	2.3
2015	2015 FIBA Europe Under-16 Championship Division B	Estonia U-16	8	8	23.4	.438	.000	.671	7.8	1.1	1.0	2.2	7.8
2016	2016 FIBA Europe Under-18 Championship Division B	Estonia U-18	8	–	34.0	.554	.000	.577	11.0	2.9	1.0	3.1	13.4
2017	2017 FIBA U18 European Championship Division B	Estonia U-18	8	8	25.2	.552	.333	.591	8.4	2.5	1.3	2.6	11.4

== Awards and accomplishments ==
=== Professional career ===
Kalev/Cramo

- Estonian League champion: 2017
- Estonian Cup winner: 2016

=== Individual ===
- Estonian League Best Young Player: 2018
