= Estonian Basketball Association =

Sports governing body in Estonia

- Sport: Basketball
- Jurisdiction: Estonia
- Founded: 14 December 1923; 30 November 1989
- Affiliation: FIBA
- Regional affiliation: FIBA Europe
- Headquarters: Tallinn
- President: Priit Sarapuu
- Men's coach: Heiko Rannula
- Women's coach: Toomas Annuk

Official website
- www.basket.ee
- (Estonia)

The Estonian Basketball Association (Estonian: Eesti Korvpalliliit) is the governing body of basketball in Estonia. It was founded in 1923, and joined FIBA in 1934. After 1940 though, they suspended operations due to being occupied by the Soviet Union.

The Estonian Basketball Association operates the Estonian men's national team and Estonian women's national team. They organize national competitions throughout Estonia, for both the men's and women's senior teams and also the youth national basketball teams.

The top professional league in Estonia is the Korvpalli Meistriliiga.

== Presidents ==
- 1989–1993 Aadu Kana
- 1993–2000 Priit Vilba
- 2000–2012 Peep Aaviksoo
- 2012–2016 Jüri Ratas
- 2016–2020 Jaak Salumets
- 17.12.2020– Priit Sarapuu

== National basketball teams ==
- Estonia national basketball team
- Estonia men's national under-20 basketball team
- Estonia men's national under-18 basketball team
- Estonia men's national under-16 basketball team
- Estonia women's national basketball team
- Estonia women's national under-20 basketball team
- Estonia women's national under-18 basketball team
- Estonia women's national under-16 basketball team
- Estonia men's national 3x3 team
- Estonia women's national 3x3 team
