= Jukka Toijala =

Finnish basketball coach and former player (born 1972)

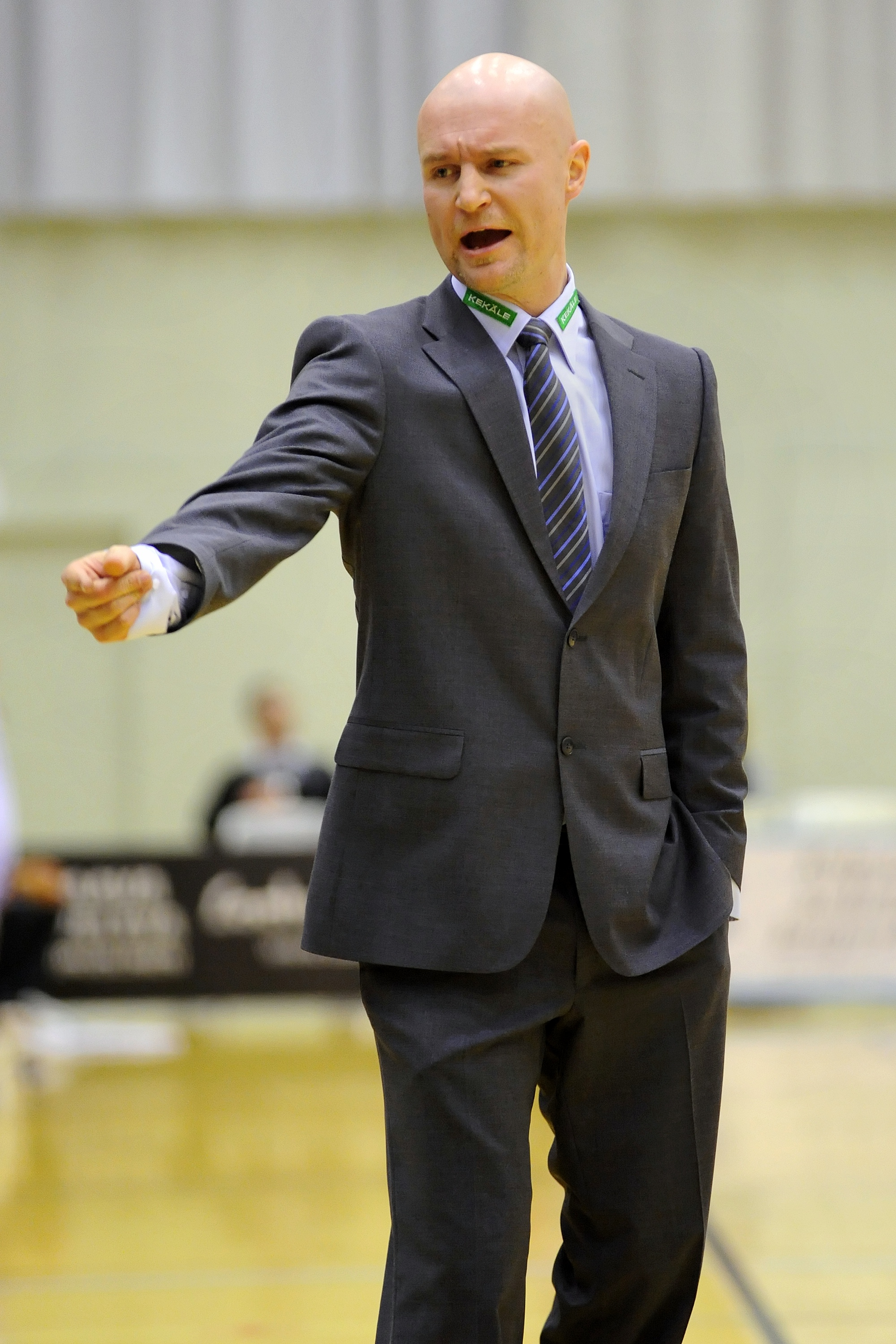
- Toijala coaching Kataja in 2010.

Yokohama B-Corsairs
- Title: Assistant coach
- League: B.League

Personal information
- Born: 9 May 1972 (age 54) Kouvola, Finland

Career information
- Playing career: 1993–2006
- Position: Guard
- Coaching career: 2006–present

Career history

Playing
- 1993–1997: Kouvot
- 1998: Echo Houthalen
- 1998–2000: Kouvot
- 2001–2003: Kataja
- 2003–2006: Kouvot

Coaching
- 2006–2010: Kouvot
- 2010–2016: Kataja
- 2010–2019: Finland (assistant)
- 2016–2018: Steaua Bucuresti
- 2018–2019: Trefl Sopot
- 2019: HBA-Märsky
- 2019–2024: Estonia
- 2024–present: Yokohama B-Corsairs (assistant)

Jukka Toijala (born 9 May 1972) is a Finnish professional basketball coach and former player, who is currently working as the assistant coach of the Yokohama B-Corsairs in Japan's B.League. Previously he worked as the head coach of the Estonia national team during 2019–2024.

== Coaching career ==
=== Kouvot ===
After announcing his retirement from playing career, Toijala stayed in Kouvola with Kouvot and was named the head coach of the team in March 2006, after Risto Piipari.

=== Kataja Basket ===
In 2010, Toijala decided to stay in Finland and signed a deal with Finnish team Kataja Basket. He departed the club in 2016.

=== Steaua București ===
Toijala worked as the head coach of Steaua București in the Romanian Liga Națională from 2016 until 2018. Toijala led Steaua to the finals of the Romanian league twice, eventually falling short on both occasions. Due to political turmoil inside the club, Toijala was released in October 2018. The club later sued Toijala and four players under contract to the court to avoid paying them salaries for the ongoing 2018–19 season.

=== Trefl Sopot ===
After his release, he worked as a head coach of Polish club Trefl Sopot of the Polish Basketball League in 2018–2019.

In 2019, Toijala worked briefly also as the head coach of HBA-Märsky in the Finnish second league.

During 2010–2019, Toijala worked also as the assistant coach of the senior Finnish national basketball team.

=== Estonia ===
On 23 October 2019, Jukka Toijala was named the head coach of the Estonia senior national team. Toijala led Estonia to qualify for EuroBasket 2022 final tournament, where the team eventually finished 19th place. After a successful three-year spell, it was announced on 23 November 2022 that Toijala had extended his contract with Estonia, signing a deal until the end of February 2026.

=== Yokohama B-Corsairs (assistant) ===
In late June 2024, Toijala invoked a foreign transfer release clause in his contract, and joined the coaching staff of Lassi Tuovi in Yokohama B-Corsairs in Japan's B.League 1 as the assistant coach.
