= Märt Rosenthal =

Estonian professional basketball player

No. 1 – Tartu Ülikool
- Position: Shooting guard
- League: Korvpalli Meistriliiga; Estonian-Latvian Basketball League

Personal information
- Born: 15 March 1999 (age 27) Tartu, Estonia
- Listed height: 1.93 m (6 ft 4 in)
- Listed weight: 95 kg (209 lb)

Career information
- Playing career: 2015–present

Career history
- 2015–2019: Tartu Ülikool
- 2014–2018: →BC Tartu
- 2019–2021: BC Pärnu
- 2021–2024: Tartu Ülikool
- 2024–2025: Stal Ostrów Wielkopolski
- 2025–2026: BC Kalev
- 2026–present: Tartu Ülikool

Career highlights
- KML All-Star Five (2024); Estonian Cup winner (2021); Estonian Cup MVP (2021); KML Best Defender (2021)
Medals
Men's basketball
Representing Estonia
FIBA Europe U-16 Championship Division B
Gold medal – first place	2015 Bulgaria	U16 Team
FIBA Europe U-18 Championship Division B
Bronze medal – third place	2017 Estonia	U18 Team

Märt Rosenthal (born 15 March 1999) is an Estonian professional basketball player for BC Kalev of the Korvpalli Meistriliiga and the Estonian-Latvian Basketball League. He also represents the Estonian national team internationally. Standing at 1.93 m (6 ft 4 in), he plays at the shooting guard position.

== National team career ==
Rosenthal made his debut for the Estonian national team on 21 February 2021, in a EuroBasket 2022 qualifier against Russia, scoring 4 points in a 52–75 defeat.

He represented the Estonian national team at EuroBasket 2025, where he played in four games total.

== Career statistics ==
=== National team ===
Team	Tournament	Pos.	GP	PPG	RPG	APG
Estonia	EuroBasket 2025	19th	4	2.0	1.3	1.8
