= Joonas Riismaa =

Estonian professional basketball player

No. 25 – Dinamo Sassari
- Position: Shooting guard
- League: Lega Basket Serie A

Personal information
- Born: 6 March 2002 (age 24) Rapla, Estonia
- Listed height: 1.99 m (6 ft 6 in)
- Listed weight: 90 kg (198 lb)

Career information
- Playing career: 2018–present

Career history
- 2018–2022: Pistoia Basket 2000
- 2018–2020: →Basket Montale
- 2022–2024: New Basket Brindisi
- 2024–2026: Pallacanestro Cantù
- 2025–2026: →Derthona Basket
- 2026–present: Dinamo Sassari

Career highlights
- Italian Second League champion (2025)
Medals
Men's basketball
Representing Estonia
FIBA Europe U-20 Championship Division B
Bronze medal – third place	2022 Georgia	U20 Team

Joonas Riismaa (born 6 March 2002) is an Estonian professional basketball player for Dinamo Sassari of the Lega Basket Serie A (LBA). He also represents the Estonian national team.

== Professional career ==
Riismaa played youth basketball with Mens Sana Basketball Academy. In 2018, he signed a junior contract with Pistoia Basket. After playing for Pistoia's under-18 and reserve teams from 2018 to 2020, Riismaa made his debut for the senior team in 2020.

On 11 July 2022, Riismaa signed a contract with Happy Casa Brindisi of the Lega Basket Serie A (LBA) and the FIBA Europe Cup.

Riismaa became Italian Serie A2 champion in 2025 with Pallacanestro Cantù, averaging 4.5 points and 2.4 rebounds per game.

On September 8, 2025, he was loaned to Derthona Basket of the Italian Lega Basket Serie A (LBA).

== National team career ==
Riismaa helped the Estonian U20 national team win the bronze medal at the Division B tournament of the 2022 FIBA U20 European Championship.

== Career statistics ==
=== National team ===
Team	Tournament	Pos.	GP	PPG	RPG	APG
Estonia	EuroBasket 2025	19th	5	2.6	2.0	0.8
