= Kaspar Treier =

Estonian basketball player

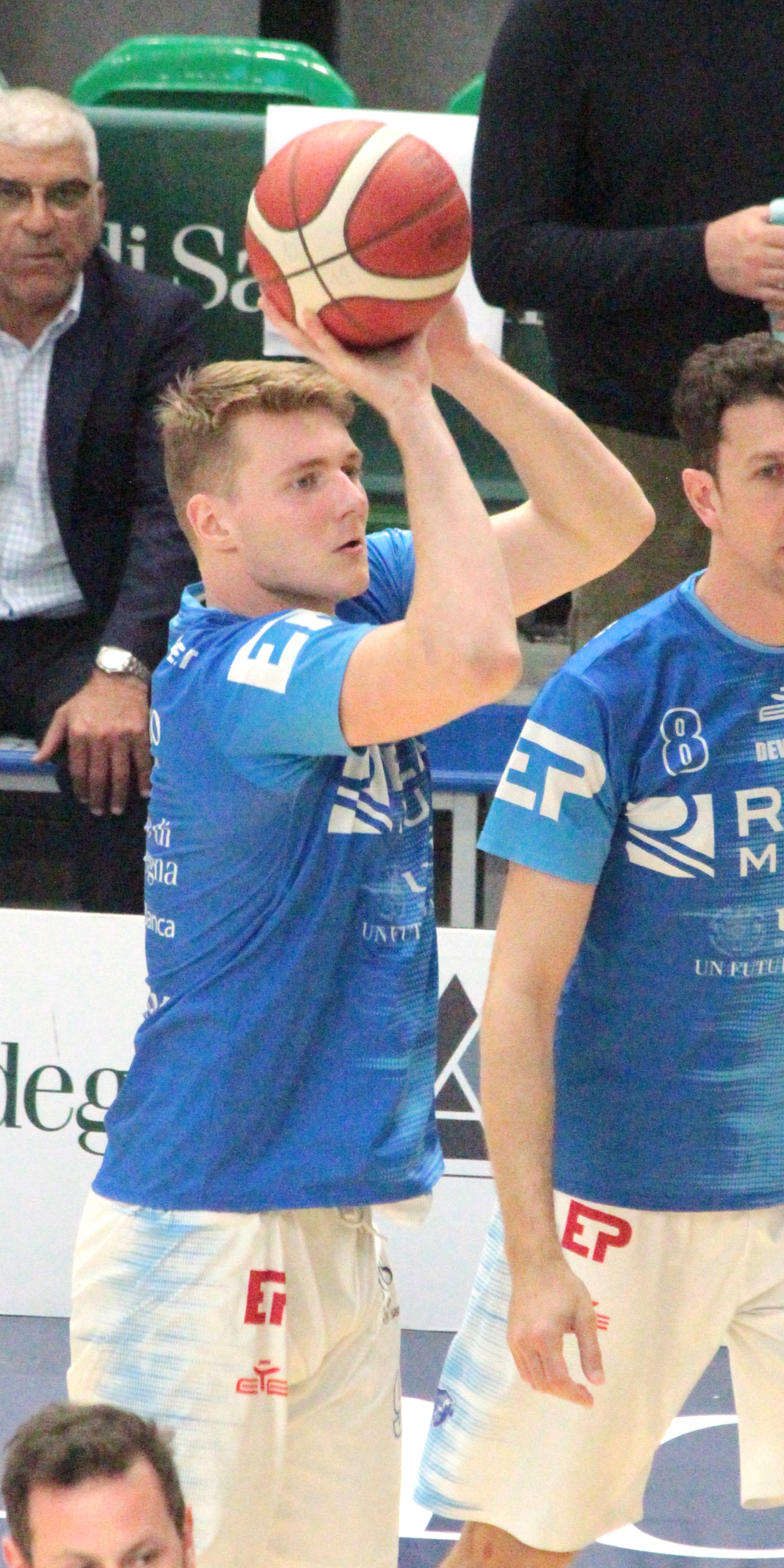
- Treier in 2023

Movistar Estudiantes
- Position: Small forward
- League: Primera FEB

Personal information
- Born: 19 September 1999 (age 27) Tartu, Estonia
- Listed height: 2.04 m (6 ft 8 in)
- Listed weight: 105 kg (231 lb)

Career history
- 2016–2017: PMS Basketball
- 2017–2019: Poderosa Montegranaro
- 2019–2020: Basket Ravenna
- 2020–2024: Dinamo Sassari
- 2024–2026: Napoli Basket
- 2026–present: Estudiantes
Medals
Men's basketball
Representing Estonia
FIBA Europe U-16 Championship Division B
Gold medal – first place	2015 Bulgaria	U16 Team
FIBA Europe U-18 Championship Division B
Bronze medal – third place	2017 Estonia	U18 Team

Kaspar Treier (born 19 September 1999) is an Estonian professional basketball player for Estudiantes of the Primera FEB. He also represents the Estonian national basketball team internationally. Standing at 2.04 m (6 ft 8 in), he plays at the small forward position.

== Professional career ==
Treier began playing basketball with Erkmaa academy before moving to PMS Basketball in August 2014.

On 4 August 2017, Treier signed with Poderosa Montegranaro of the Serie A2.

In 2017 he won Italian Championship Under 21 and he was named MVP.

On 10 June 2019, Treier signed with Felice Scandone of the Lega Basket Serie A (LBA).

In July 2019, Treier signed with Basket Ravenna of the Serie A2 Basket (LNP)

On 3 July 2020, Treier signed a three-year deal with Dinamo Sassari of the Lega Basket Serie A (LBA).

On June 13, 2024, he signed with Napoli Basket of the Italian Lega Basket Serie A (LBA). He renewed his contract with the team on June 28, 2025, signing a new two-years deal.

== National team career ==
With national Team Under 16 he won the European Division B in 2015. Treier made his debut for the Estonian national team on 30 November 2018, in a 2019 FIBA Basketball World Cup qualifier against Georgia.

== Career statistics ==
=== National team ===
Team	Tournament	Pos.	GP	PPG	RPG	APG
Estonia	EuroBasket 2025	19th	5	7.6	3.6	1.2
