= Kasper Suurorg =

Estonian professional basketball player

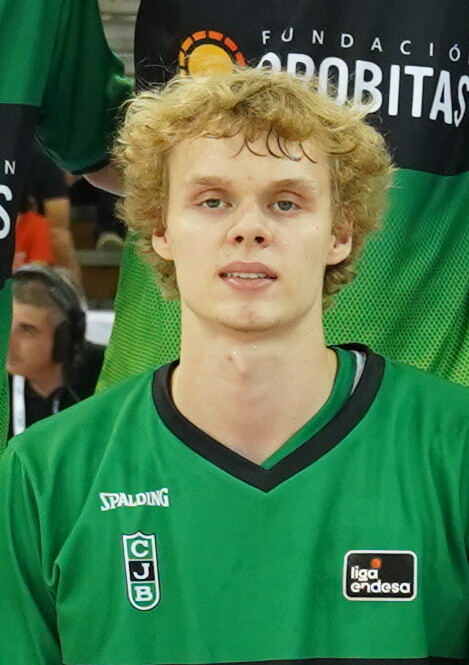
- Kasper Suurorg in 2022

No. 11 – AMW Arka Gdynia
- Position: Point guard
- League: PLK

Personal information
- Born: 27 May 2002 (age 24) Tallinn, Estonia
- Listed height: 2.00 m (6 ft 7 in)
- Listed weight: 86 kg (190 lb)

Career information
- College: St. Francis Brooklyn (2021–2022)
- Playing career: 2017–present

Career history
- 2017–2018: G4S Noorteliiga
- 2020–2021: BC Pärnu
- 2022–2023: Joventut Badalona
- 2022–2023: →CB Prat
- 2023–2024: TalTech
- 2024–2025: BC Kalev
- 2025–2026: Trefl Sopot
- 2026–present: Arka Gdynia

Career highlights
- Polish Cup winner (2026); Estonian League champion (2025); Estonian Cup winner (2025)
Medals
Men's basketball
Representing Estonia
FIBA Europe U-20 Championship Division B
Bronze medal – third place	2022 Georgia	U20 Team

Kasper Suurorg (born 27 May 2002) is an Estonian professional basketball player for Arka Gdynia of the Polish Basketball League (PLK). Standing at 2.00 m (6 ft 7 in), he plays at the point guard position. Suurorg has also represented the Estonian national basketball team internationally.

== Career statistics ==
Legend
GP	Games played	GS	Games started	MPG	Minutes per game
FG%	Field-goal percentage	3P%	3-point field-goal percentage	FT%	Free-throw percentage
RPG	Rebounds per game	APG	Assists per game	SPG	Steals per game
BPG	Blocks per game	PPG	Points per game	PIR	Performance index rating
**Bold**	Career high

=== Domestic leagues ===
Season	Team	League	GP	MPG	FG%	3P%	FT%	RPG	APG	SPG	BPG	PPG
2020–21	(Estonia) Pärnu Sadam	LEBL	14	14.8	.429	.448	.633	3.3	1.0	.4	.7	4.6
2022–23	(Spain) CB Prat	LEB Plata	21	16.9	.404	.342	.692	1.8	2.2	.4	.0	6.0
2023–24	(Estonia) TalTech	LEBL	28	20.3	.439	.256	.633	3.3	1.0	.4	.7	17.8

=== College ===
Year	Team	GP	GS	MPG	FG%	3P%	FT%	RPG	APG	SPG	BPG	PPG
2021–22	St. Francis Brooklyn	15	0	9.3	.313	.250	.769	1.2	.5	.4	.1	2.3

== National team career ==
Kasper Suurorg has represented Estonian U16, U18, U20 teams. He won bronze medal with Estonian U20 team at the 2022 FIBA U20 European Championship.

Since 2022 he is part of the Estonian national team when he played against Finland and scoring 2 points.
