= Sander Raieste =

Estonian basketball player

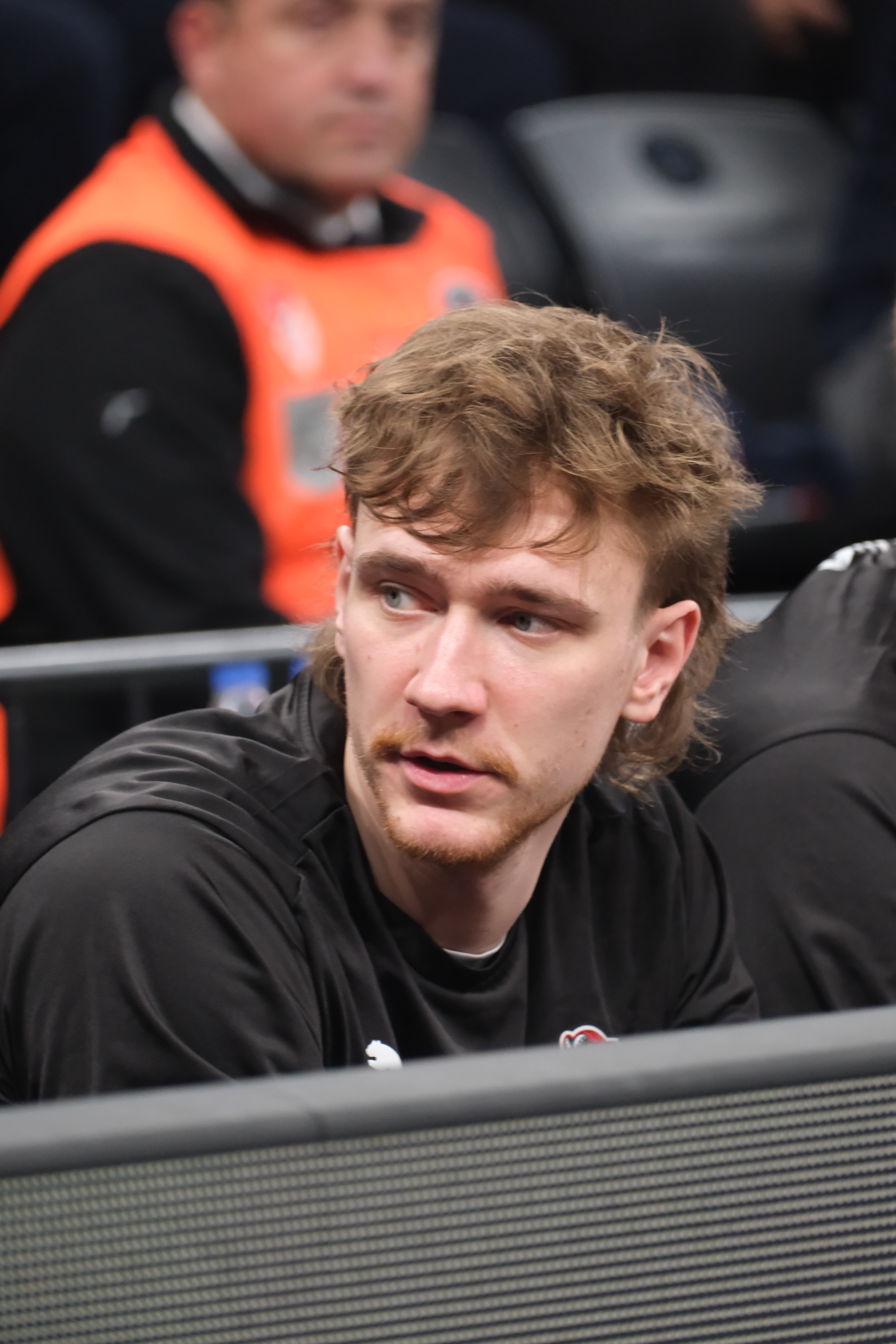
- Raieste in 2025

No. 2 – UCAM Murcia
- Position: Small forward
- League: Liga ACB; Champions League

Personal information
- Born: 31 March 1999 (age 27) Tallinn, Estonia
- Listed height: 2.04 m (6 ft 8 in)
- Listed weight: 92 kg (203 lb)

Career information
- Playing career: 2013–present

Career history
- 2013–2015: Viimsi
- 2014–2016: Audentes/Noortekoondis
- 2016–2025: Baskonia
- 2017–2019: →Baskonia B
- 2019–2020: →BC Kalev
- 2025–present: Murcia

Career highlights
- Liga ACB champion (2020)
Medals
Men's basketball
Representing Estonia
FIBA Europe U-16 Championship Division B
Gold medal – first place	2015 Bulgaria	U16 Team

Sander Raieste (born 31 March 1999) is an Estonian professional basketball player for the UCAM Murcia of the Liga ACB. Standing at 2.04 m (6 ft 8 in), he plays at the small forward position. He also represents the Estonian national basketball team internationally.

== Professional career ==
Raieste began playing basketball with Viimsi and Audentes.

On 12 August 2016, Raieste signed a five-year contract with Baskonia. He was loaned to Kalev/Cramo in the 2019–20 season, averaging 5.9 points and 3.3 rebounds per game. Raieste signed a four-year extension with Baskonia on 4 August 2020.

On July 12, 2025, he signed with UCAM Murcia of the Liga ACB.

== National team career ==
Raieste made his debut for the Estonian national team on 29 June 2018, in a 2019 FIBA Basketball World Cup qualifier against Great Britain, scoring 5 points in a 65–74 away defeat.

== Career statistics ==
Legend
GP	Games played	GS	Games started	MPG	Minutes per game
FG%	Field-goal percentage	3P%	3-point field-goal percentage	FT%	Free-throw percentage
RPG	Rebounds per game	APG	Assists per game	SPG	Steals per game
BPG	Blocks per game	PPG	Points per game	PIR	Performance index rating
**Bold**	Career high

=== EuroLeague ===
Year	Team	GP	GS	MPG	FG%	3P%	FT%	RPG	APG	SPG	BPG	PPG	PIR
2020–21	Baskonia	10	5	4.1	.300	**.500**	—	.9	.1	.1	—	0.7	0.3
2021–22	Baskonia	10	0	6.2	**.583**	.429	—	**1.1**	.3	.2	**.1**	1.7	**1.8**
2022–23	Baskonia	19	2	6.9	.440	.182	.000	**1.1**	**.3**	.2	**.1**	1.3	0.5
2023–24	Baskonia	**30**	**8**	6.7	.355	.222	—	.7	.2	.1	.0	0.8	0.3
2024–25	Baskonia	14	2	**9.7**	.444	.429	**.800**	.8	.6	.2	**.1**	**2.6**	1.6
Career		83	17	6.7	.424	.352	.571	.9	.3	.2	.0	1.3	0.9

=== Domestic leagues ===
Year	Team	League	GP	MPG	FG%	3P%	FT%	RPG	APG	SPG	BPG	PPG
2014–15	(Estonia) Audentes	KML	6	17.3	.385	.364	.727	3.3	1.8	1.0	—	5.3
2015–16	(Estonia) Audentes	KML	26	24.5	.404	.239	.729	3.6	1.3	1.1	.5	7.6
2017–18	(Spain) Baskonia B	LEB Plata	30	24.5	.484	.372	.563	5.3	2.1	.7	.5	9.4
2018–19	(Spain) Baskonia B	LEB Plata	33	28.3	.429	.276	.719	5.1	2.3	.9	.3	11.0
2019–20	(Estonia) BC Kalev	LEBL	25	19.4	.581	.383	.781	3.8	1.7	.8	.2	7.5
2019–20	(Estonia) BC Kalev	VTBUL	19	14.0	.509	.389	.615	2.6	.5	.5	.2	3.8
2020–21	(Spain) Baskonia	ACB	21	7.3	.483	.400	.600	.8	.5	.6	—	1.7
2021–22	(Spain) Baskonia	ACB	15	6.1	.071	.000	.500	.5	.1	.1	—	0.2
2022–23	(Spain) Baskonia	ACB	27	12.7	.375	.306	.722	1.8	.4	.4	.1	2.7
2023–24	(Spain) Baskonia	ACB	29	9.3	.464	.333	.857	.9	.4	.2	.0	2.3
2024–25	(Spain) Baskonia	ACB	22	9.1	.531	.565	.750	1.1	.5	.1	.1	2.1

=== National team ===
Team	Tournament	Pos.	GP	PPG	RPG	APG
Estonia	EuroBasket 2022	19th	5	3.0	2.8	1.2
Estonia	EuroBasket 2025	19th	5	3.4	3.0	0.8
