= Melwin Pantzar =

Swedish basketball player

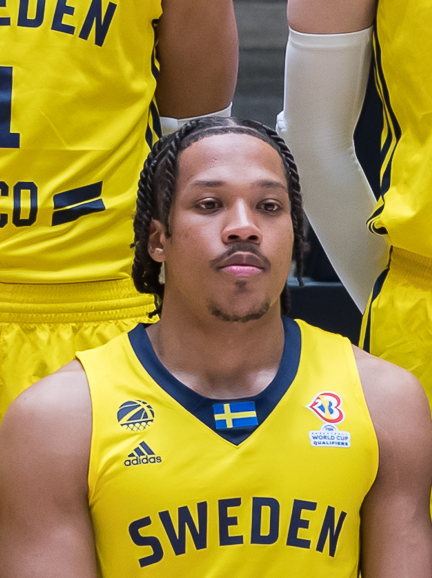
- Pantzar with the Swedish national team in 2023

No. 19 – Unicaja Málaga
- Position: Point guard
- League: Liga ACB; Champions League

Personal information
- Born: April 10, 2000 (age 26) Stockholm, Sweden
- Listed height: 1.90 m (6 ft 3 in)

Career information
- NBA draft: 2022: undrafted
- Playing career: 2018–present

Career history
- 2018–2019: Real Madrid
- 2019–2020: Monaco
- 2020–2021: Valladolid
- 2021: Manresa
- 2021–2023: Valladolid
- 2023–2025: Bilbao Basket
- 2025–present: Unicaja Málaga
- 2025–2026: →Bilbao Basket

Career highlights
- 2× FIBA Europe Cup champion (2025, 2026); FIBA Europe Cup Final MVP (2025); Liga ACB champion (2019)

Jan Patrick Melwin Pantzar (born April 10, 2000) is a Swedish professional basketball player for Unicaja Málaga of the Spanish Liga ACB and the Basketball Champions League (BCL). Standing at 6 ft 3 inches (1.90 m), Pantzar plays as a point guard.

== Early life and youth career ==
Pantzar was born in Stockholm, Sweden, to a Gambian father and Swedish mother. He played in the youth ranks of Swedish club Solna Vikings before joining the junior team of Real Madrid in 2016. He played for Real Madrid B for two seasons before making his professional debut with the senior team.

== Professional career ==
Playing only one season with Real Madrid, Pantzar helped the team win a Spanish Supercup (2018) and the season's Liga ACB trophy (2018-19).

In September 2019, Pantzar signed for Monaco of the LNB Élite and EuroCup. He would mainly play for the U21 team.

Pantzar joined Real Valladolid of the LEB Oro in July 2020.

Pantzar signed for Manresa at the end of the 2020-21 ACB season, only playing one game for the Catalans.

After the brief spell with Manresa, Pantzar signed with Valladolid again in July 2021, spending two more seasons with the LEB Oro team.

Pantzar joined Bilbao Basket in June 2023, signing a 2 season contract with the Basque team. With Bilbao, Pantzar won the 2024–25 FIBA Europe Cup and was named the tournament's Final MVP. On June 26, 2025, Bilbao announced an agreement had been reached with Unicaja for the transfer of Pantzar, but that the Swede would remain with the Basque team for a one more season as a loan player.

== Career statistics ==
Legend
GP	Games played	GS	Games started	MPG	Minutes per game
FG%	Field-goal percentage	3P%	3-point field-goal percentage	FT%	Free-throw percentage
RPG	Rebounds per game	APG	Assists per game	SPG	Steals per game
BPG	Blocks per game	PPG	Points per game	PIR	Performance index rating
**Bold**	Career high

=== Domestic leagues ===
Year	Team	League	GP	MPG	FG%	3P%	FT%	RPG	APG	SPG	BPG	PPG
2023–24	(Spain) Bilbao	ACB	33	21.1	.505	.333	.762	3.1	2.5	1.0	.2	8.7
2024–25	(Spain) Bilbao	ACB	34	24.8	.445	.319	.808	2.9	3.8	1.2	.1	9.8

=== National team ===
Team	Tournament	Pos.	GP	PPG	RPG	APG
Sweden	EuroBasket 2025	16th	6	9.8	3.8	3.7
