= Žiga Samar =

Slovenian basketball player

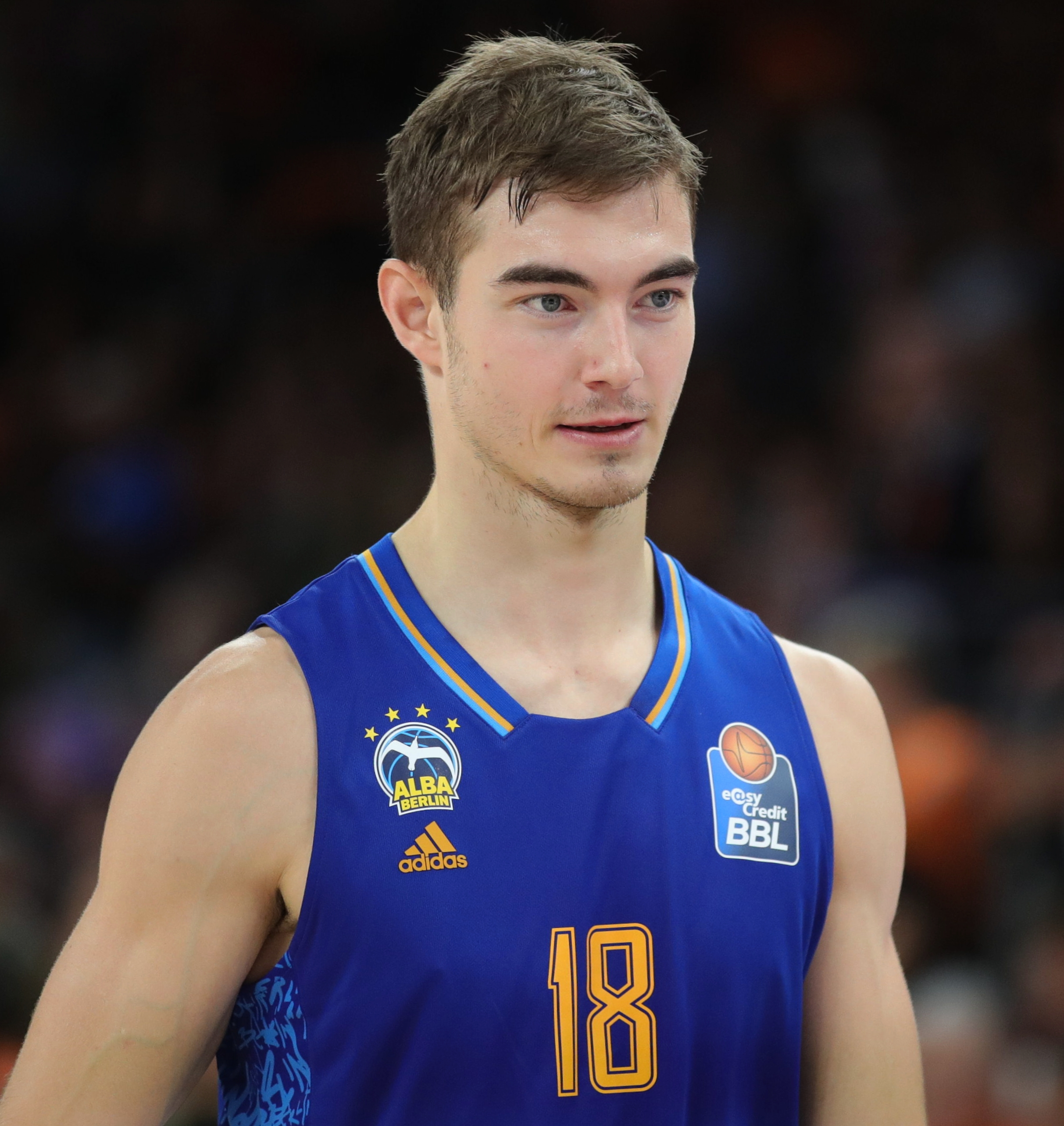
- Samar with Alba Berlin in 2023

No. 5 – San Pablo Burgos
- Position: Point guard
- League: Liga ACB; EuroCup

Personal information
- Born: 26 January 2001 (age 25) Jesenice, Slovenia
- Listed height: 1.97 m (6 ft 6 in)
- Listed weight: 83 kg (183 lb)

Career information
- NBA draft: 2022: undrafted
- Playing career: 2019–present

Career history
- 2017–2019: Real Madrid B
- 2019–2022: Fuenlabrada
- 2019–2020: → Zamora
- 2022–2025: Alba Berlin
- 2022–2023: → Hamburg Towers
- 2025: → Gran Canaria
- 2025–2026: Gran Canaria
- 2026–present: San Pablo Burgos

Career highlights
- Spanish League All-Young Players Team (2022)
Medals
Men's basketball
Representing Slovenia
FIBA U18 European Championship
Bronze medal – third place	2019 Greece	Team

Žiga Samar (born 26 January 2001) is a Slovenian professional basketball player for San Pablo Burgos of the Spanish Liga ACB and the EuroCup. He is a 1.97 m tall point guard.

== Professional career ==
Samar made his professional debut for Real Madrid B in the Liga EBA during the 2017–18 season.

On 19 August 2019 Samar signed a four-year contract with Spanish team Fuenlabrada. For the 2019–20 season he was loaned to Zamora of the LEB Plata.

On 22 July 2022 he signed with Alba Berlin of the Basketball Bundesliga (BBL). On 5 August 2022 Samar joined fellow Bundesliga side Hamburg Towers on loan.

=== 2023–24 season ===
On 5 October 2023, Samar made his EuroLeague debut, finishing the game against FC Bayern Munich (basketball) with 5 points (2/5 FG), 1 rebound, 3 assists, and 1 turnover in 16 minutes of play.

=== Spain (2024–present) ===
After signing and playing for CB Gran Canaria during the 2025–26 season, Samar signed for San Pablo Burgos of the Spanish Liga ACB on June 12, 2026.

On June 12, 2026, he signed with San Pablo Burgos of the Spanish Liga ACB and the EuroCup.

== Career statistics ==
Legend
GP	Games played	GS	Games started	MPG	Minutes per game
FG%	Field-goal percentage	3P%	3-point field-goal percentage	FT%	Free-throw percentage
RPG	Rebounds per game	APG	Assists per game	SPG	Steals per game
BPG	Blocks per game	PPG	Points per game	PIR	Performance index rating
**Bold**	Career high

=== EuroLeague ===
Year	Team	GP	GS	MPG	FG%	3P%	FT%	RPG	APG	SPG	BPG	PPG	PIR
2023–24	Alba Berlin	**14**	3	12.4	.360	**.400**	**.857**	**1.4**	2.2	**.8**	—	3.4	2.5
2024–25	Alba Berlin	**14**	1	**13.6**	**.422**	**.400**	.813	1.3	**2.9**	.7	—	**4.1**	**4.6**
Career		28	4	13.0	.389	.400	.826	1.4	2.5	.8	—	3.8	3.6

=== EuroCup ===
Year	Team	GP	GS	MPG	FG%	3P%	FT%	RPG	APG	SPG	BPG	PPG	PIR
2022–23	Hamburg Towers	19	10	25.7	.410	.309	.806	2.8	6.1	1.1	.1	9.8	11.1
Career		19	10	25.7	.410	.309	.806	2.8	6.1	1.1	.1	9.8	11.1

=== Domestic leagues ===
Year	Team	League	GP	MPG	FG%	3P%	FT%	RPG	APG	SPG	BPG	PPG
2019–20	(Spain) Zamora	LEB Plata	25	26.6	.415	.290	.708	3.7	3.8	1.1	.2	10.6
2020–21	(Spain) Fuenlabrada	ACB	34	10.5	.441	.216	.750	1.3	1.8	.4	.0	3.1
2021–22	(Spain) Fuenlabrada	ACB	30	20.7	.485	.471	.769	2.7	4.7	1.0	.1	7.6
2022–23	(Germany) Hamburg Towers	BBL	34	24.0	.383	.250	.798	3.0	5.9	1.3	.1	8.2
2023–24	(Germany) Alba Berlin	BBL	17	16.2	.367	.292	.632	1.7	4.9	.6	.1	3.7
