= Herbert Niiler =

Estonian basketball player and coach

Personal information
- Born: 27 April 1905 Tallinn
- Died: 13 April 1982 (aged 76) Zelienople, Pennsylvania

Career history

Coaching
- Tartu NMKÜ
- Tartu Kalev
- 1929–1940: Estonia

Herbert Aleksander Juhan Niiler (27 April 1905 – 13 April 1982) was an Estonian American basketball player and coach.

Niiler was born in Tallinn. He received a degree in physical education from Springfield College in 1928 and then introduced basketball to Estonia. He coached the Estonia men's national basketball team in the 1936 Summer Olympics, where the team placed 9th. He also led Estonia to EuroBasket 1937 and EuroBasket 1939, finishing both in 5th place.

In 1945, he fled from the Soviet occupation with his family via Sweden and Germany to the United States, where they resided in Pittsburgh from 1949 onward.

Niiler died at North Hills Passavant Hospital in 1982.

== Family ==
Oceanographer Pearn P. Niiler is his son.
