= HC Panter =

Ice hockey team in Tallinn, Estonia

- City: Tallinn
- League: OHL
- Founded: 2001
- Home arena: Haabersti Ice Hall
- Colours: Black, red, white
- Head coach: Mikko Mäenpää
- Captain: Rasmus Kiik
- Website: hcpanter.ee

Championships
- Meistriliiga: 2004, 2023

HC Panter are a professional ice hockey team based in Tallinn, Estonia. They compete in the Optibet Hockey League (OHL). The team plays its home games at Haabersti Ice Hall. They have won two Estonian championships since their founding in 2001.

== History ==
The team was founded in 2001 by Rein Mölder and Olle Sildre. HC Panter played in the Meistriliiga from 2001 to 2006, winning the championship in 2004. After ceasing operations from 2006 to 2011, the team once again played in the Meistriliiga from 2011 to 2016. Afterwards, the club focused more on youth development. The team was reactivated in 2020 and won the Estonian championship in 2023. HC Panter subsequently joined the Optibet Hockey League in 2023, finishing the regular season in fourth place out of nine teams.

== Season-by-season record ==
Note: GP = Games played, W = Wins, OTW = Overtime wins, T = Ties, OTL = Overtime losses, L = Losses, Pts = Points, GF = Goals for, GA = Goals against

=== Meistriliiga ===
Season	GP	W	OTW	T	OTL	L	Pts	GF	GA	Finish	Playoffs
2001–02	10	6	—	1	—	3	13	55	44	3rd, Tallinn	Did not qualify
2001–02	10	2	—	1	—	7	5	44	56	5th, Final phase	Did not qualify
2002–03	20	11	—	1	—	8	23	88	75	4th	Won Third-place games, 3–1 (Kohtla-Järve CHC)
2003–04	16	5	—	4	—	7	14	57	62	3rd	Won Championship, 2–1 (Narva PSK)
2004–05	16	8	1	2	1	4	29	72	46	2nd	Lost Championship, 1–3 (HK Stars)
2005–06	16	10	0	0	1	5	31	84	48	3rd	Won Third-place games, 2–0 (Narva PSK)
2011–12	16	11	1	—	0	4	35	75	64	2nd	Lost Third-place games, 0–2 (Viiking Sport)
2012–13	16	5	0	—	0	11	15	95	80	4th	Lost Third-place game (Narva PSK)
2013–14	20	7	0	—	0	13	21	94	105	4th	Lost Third-place games, 0–2 (Narva PSK)
2014–15	16	5	0	—	1	10	16	61	79	4th	Won Third-place game (Viru-Sputnik)
2015–16	14	5	0	—	2	7	17	57	53	2nd	—
2020–21	16	8	0	—	2	6	18	69	62	3rd	—
2021–22	24	13	1	—	1	9	29	103	90	4th	Won Third-place game (HC Everest)
2022–23	24	19	0	—	1	4	39	132	67	2nd	Lost Championship, 1–3 (HK Kurbads)^{[a]}
2023–24	16	1	0	—	0	15	2	41	94	5th	Did not qualify
2024–25	20	7	1	—	1	11	17	76	82	5th	Did not qualify

- ^{a} HC Panter were still crowned Estonian champions due to HK Kurbads being a Latvian team.

=== OHL ===
Season	GP	W	OTW	OTL	L	Pts	GF	GA	Finish	Playoffs
2023–24	32	17	2	0	13	38	122	106	4th	Lost Quarterfinals, 1–3 (HK Prizma)
2024–25	36	16	5	3	12	45	114	122	3rd	Lost Semifinals, 0–4 (HK Zemgale)
2025–26	40	12	4	2	22	34	115	163	6th	Lost Quarterfinals, 0–3 (Liepāja)

== Team and league honours ==
Estonian Championship

- 2003–04, 2022–23

Kārlis Skrastiņš Award

- Saveli Novikov: 2023–24
