= Toivo Suursoo =

Estonian ice hockey player and coach

- Born: 13 November 1975 (age 50) Tallinn, then part of Estonian SSR, Soviet Union
- Height: 1.81 m (5 ft 11 in)
- Weight: 90 kg (198 lb; 14 st 2 lb)
- Position: Right wing
- Shot: Right
- Played for: Krylya Sovetov Moscow; TPS; Adirondack Red Wings; Malmö Redhawks; Cincinnati Mighty Ducks; Luleå HF; Neftekhimik Nizhnekamsk; Herning Blue Fox; Riga 2000; Amur Khabarovsk; Keramin Minsk; IF Troja-Ljungby; Tartu Kalev-Välk; IK Oskarshamn; Swindon Wildcats; Mörrums GoIS; Lions de Lyon; Kongsvinger Knights
- National team: Estonia
- NHL draft: 283rd overall, 1994; Detroit Red Wings
- Playing career: 1990–2012

Toivo Suursoo (born 13 November 1975) is an Estonian ice hockey coach and former professional player.

Suursoo was selected by the Detroit Red Wings with the 283rd overall pick in the 1994 NHL entry draft, becoming the first player born in Estonia, to be drafted in the National Hockey League (NHL). Suursoo played for Red Wings' affiliates, the Adirondack Red Wings and the Cincinnati Mighty Ducks in the American Hockey League (AHL), but was unable to earn an NHL deal.

Internationally, Suursoo competed for Estonia.

== Career statistics ==
=== Regular season and playoffs ===
			Regular season					Playoffs
Season	Team	League	GP	G	A	Pts	PIM	GP	G	A	Pts	PIM
1990–91	LNSK Narva	EML	—	—	—	—	—	—	—	—	—	—
1991–92	Tallinn JSK	EML	—	—	—	—	—	—	—	—	—	—
1992–93	Narva Kreenholm	EML	—	—	—	—	—	—	—	—	—	—
1993–94	Krylya Sovetov Moscow	IHL	33	3	0	3	8	—	—	—	—	—
1994–95	Krylya Sovetov Moscow	IHL	47	10	5	15	36	4	0	0	0	4
1994–95	Soviet Wings	IHL	10	3	1	4	19	—	—	—	—	—
1995–96	Krylya Sovetov Moscow	IHL	47	6	4	10	36	—	—	—	—	—
1996–97	TPS	SM-l	50	11	8	19	64	12	2	3	5	4
1997–98	TPS	SM-l	38	17	5	22	46	4	2	1	3	2
1998–99	Adirondack Red Wings	AHL	2	0	0	0	0	—	—	—	—	—
1998–99	MIF Redhawks	SEL	29	8	6	14	57	8	4	3	7	12
1999–00	MIF Redhawks	SEL	32	6	5	11	24	1	0	0	0	0
2000–01	Cincinnati Mighty Ducks	AHL	51	14	12	26	37	—	—	—	—	—
2001–02	Luleå HF	SEL	48	15	3	18	57	5	0	0	0	0
2002–03	MIF Redhawks	SEL	34	10	8	18	36	—	—	—	—	—
2003–04	Malmö Redhawks	SEL	22	2	0	2	35	—	—	—	—	—
2003–04	Neftekhimik Nizhnekamsk	RSL	25	3	4	7	43	5	0	0	0	6
2004–05	Herning Blue Fox	DEN	26	14	10	24	66	16	6	5	11	33
2005–06	Riga 2000	BXL	45	26	10	36	46	2	1	1	2	0
2006–07	Amur Khabarovsk	RSL	19	3	4	7	16	—	—	—	—	—
2006–07	Keramin Minsk	BXL	14	3	6	9	33	10	6	2	8	6
2007–08	Herning Blue Fox	DEN	41	19	15	34	59	12	5	4	9	16
2008–09	Keramin Minsk	BXL	33	11	10	21	28	—	—	—	—	—
2008–09	IF Troja-Ljungby	Allsv	9	2	5	7	6	2	2	2	4	2
2009–10	Tartu Kalev-Välk	EML	1	1	0	1	0	—	—	—	—	—
2009–10	IK Oskarshamn	Allsv	34	8	8	16	32	—	—	—	—	—
2010–11	Swindon Wildcats	EPIHL	24	13	9	22	43	—	—	—	—	—
2010–11	Mörrums GoIS	SWE-1	10	2	4	6	6	—	—	—	—	—
2011–12	Lions de Lyon	FRA-1	5	0	1	1	18	—	—	—	—	—
2011–12	Kongsvinger Knights	NOR-1	15	7	13	20	8	—	—	—	—	—
IHL totals			127	19	9	28	80	4	0	0	0	4
SM-liiga totals			88	28	13	41	110	16	4	4	8	6
AHL totals			53	14	12	26	37	—	—	—	—	—
SEL totals			165	41	22	63	209	14	4	3	7	12
RSL totals			44	6	8	14	59	5	0	0	0	6
DEN totals			67	33	25	58	125	28	11	9	20	49
BXL totals			92	40	26	66	107	12	7	3	10	6

=== International statistics ===
Year	Team	Event	Result	GP	G	A	Pts	PIM
2003	Estonia	WC-D1	22nd	3	1	1	2	4
2007	Estonia	WC-D1	23rd	4	2	2	4	4
2011	Estonia	WC-D1	27th	5	1	1	2	4
Senior totals				12	4	4	8	12
