= Dmitri Suur =

Estonian ice hockey player (born 1975)

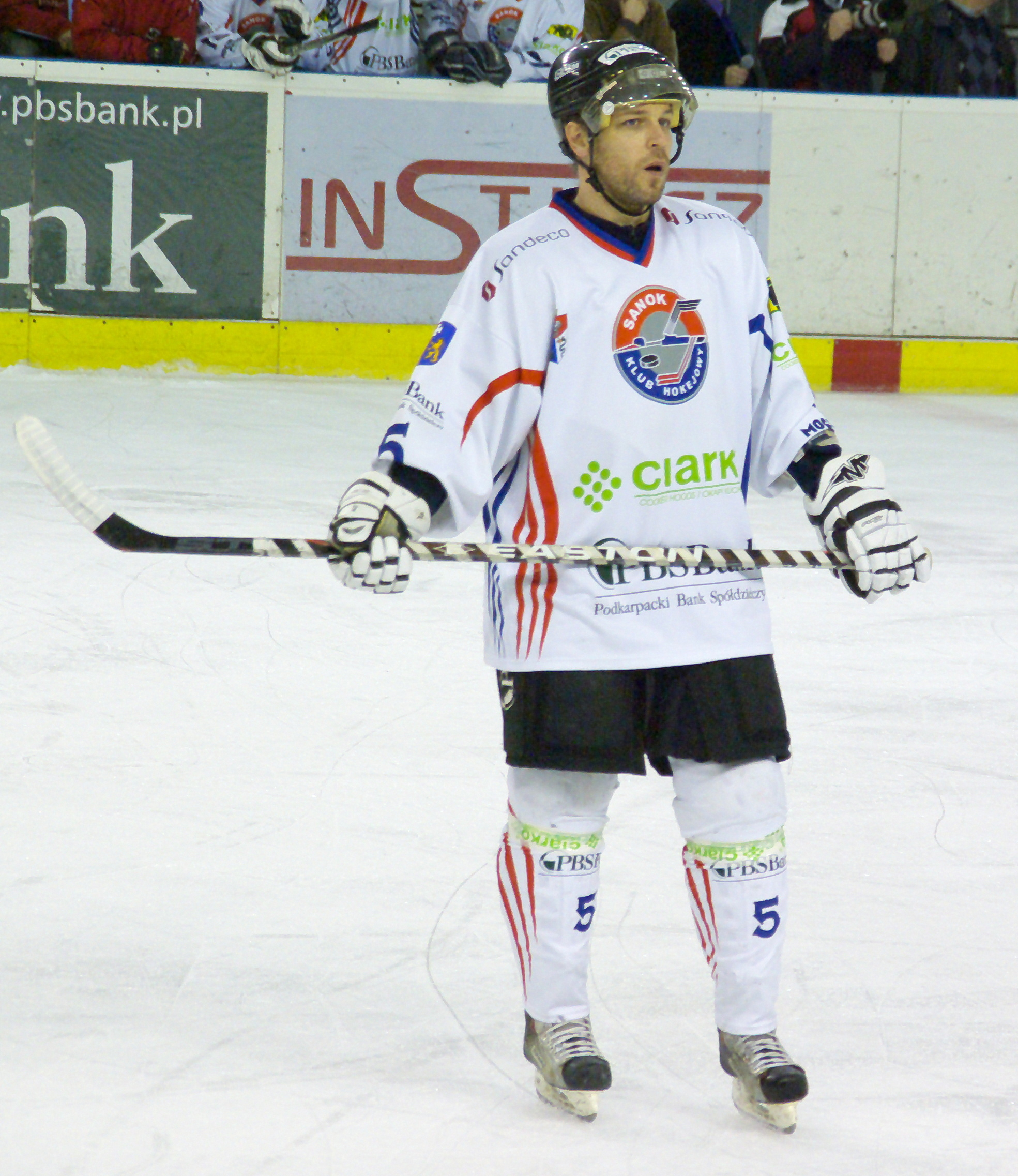
- Born: February 25, 1975 (age 51) Tallinn, then part of Estonian SSR, Soviet Union
- Height: 6 ft 2 in (188 cm)
- Weight: 211 lb (96 kg; 15 st 1 lb)
- Position: Defence
- Shot: Right
- Ekstraliga team Former teams: KH Sanok; HK Ardo Nitra; Adirondack Frostbite; HC Karlovy Vary; HC Slovan Bratislava; Detroit Vipers; Flint Generals; Winston-Salem IceHawks; Pārdaugava Rīga
- National team: Estonia
- Playing career: 1990–2013

Dmitri Suur (before marriage Dmitri Rodin, Russian: Дмитрий Суур (Родин); born February 25, 1975) is an Estonian professional ice hockey player. He currently plays for the Sheffield Steeldogs of the English Premier Ice Hockey League.

Best defenseman at 1995 World Junior Ice Hockey Championships Pool C2.

He was a former Russian citizen and received Estonian citizenship in 2005.

== Career statistics ==
			Regular season					Playoffs
Season	Team	League	GP	G	A	Pts	PIM	GP	G	A	Pts	PIM
1990–91	Narva PSK	Estonia	—	—	—	—	—	—	—	—	—	—
1991–92	Tallinna JSK	Estonia	—	—	—	—	—	—	—	—	—	—
1992–93	Tallinna JSK	Estonia	—	—	—	—	—	—	—	—	—	—
1992–93	Krylya Sovetov Moscow-2	Russia2	32	2	2	4	38	—	—	—	—	—
1993–94	Krylya Sovetov Moscow-2	Russia3	41	5	3	8	47	—	—	—	—	—
1994–95	Pardaugava Riga	Russia	21	0	0	0	14	—	—	—	—	—
1995–96	North Battleford North Stars	SJHL	63	16	41	57	118	—	—	—	—	—
1996–97	Utah Grizzlies	IHL	3	0	0	0	4	—	—	—	—	—
1996–97	Detroit Vipers	IHL	10	0	0	0	4	—	—	—	—	—
1996–97	Flint Generals	CoHL	58	7	25	32	35	11	0	0	0	6
1997–98	Rochester Americans	AHL	1	0	1	1	0	—	—	—	—	—
1997–98	Detroit Vipers	IHL	6	0	0	0	2	—	—	—	—	—
1997–98	Michigan K-Wings	IHL	2	0	1	1	0	—	—	—	—	—
1997–98	Long Beach Ice Dogs	IHL	5	1	0	1	4	—	—	—	—	—
1997–98	Flint Generals	UHL	32	3	21	24	16	—	—	—	—	—
1997–98	Winston-Salem IceHawks	UHL	28	6	10	16	10	—	—	—	—	—
1998–99	Winston-Salem IceHawks	UHL	73	11	44	55	57	5	1	4	5	4
1999–00	Detroit Vipers	IHL	9	0	0	0	6	—	—	—	—	—
1999–00	Flint Generals	UHL	60	11	36	47	63	7	0	1	1	6
2000–01	HC Slovan Bratislava	Slovakia	47	4	11	15	87	5	1	2	3	2
2001–02	HC Karlovy Vary	Czech	50	1	4	5	79	—	—	—	—	—
2002–03	HC Energie Karlovy Vary	Czech	44	3	2	5	36	—	—	—	—	—
2003–04	HC Energie Karlovy Vary	Czech	41	0	3	3	38	—	—	—	—	—
2004–05	HC Energie Karlovy Vary	Czech	33	0	4	4	24	—	—	—	—	—
2005–06	Herning Blue Fox	Denmark	2	0	0	0	4	—	—	—	—	—
2005–06	Adirondack Frostbite	UHL	59	3	17	20	111	6	0	1	1	12
2006–07	HK Stars	Estonia	5	3	5	8	18	—	—	—	—	—
2006–07	HK Nitra	Slovakia	25	0	5	5	59	6	0	1	1	8
2007–08	HK Nitra	Slovakia	19	1	1	2	50	—	—	—	—	—
2007–08	Podhale Nowy Targ	Poland	17	5	9	14	38	—	—	—	—	—
2008–09	HC Csíkszereda	MOL Liga	31	8	16	24	80	—	—	—	—	—
2008–09	HC Csíkszereda	Romania	14	3	5	8	79	—	—	—	—	—
2009–10	Podhale Nowy Targ	Poland	55	10	26	36	131	—	—	—	—	—
2010–11	KH Sanok	Poland	36	3	13	16	48	10	2	6	8	18
2011–12	Hull Stingrays	EIHL	44	7	17	24	89	3	0	1	1	4
2012–13	Sheffield Steeldogs	EPIHL	22	1	3	4	32	—	—	—	—	—
2012–13	Telford Tigers	EPIHL	5	0	1	1	4	—	—	—	—	—
2012–13	Hull Stingrays	EIHL	26	1	7	8	36	—	—	—	—	—
AHL totals			1	0	1	1	0	—	—	—	—	—
Czech totals			168	4	13	17	177	—	—	—	—	—
EIHL totals			70	8	24	32	125	3	0	1	1	4
EPIHL totals			27	1	4	5	36	—	—	—	—	—
IHL totals			35	1	1	2	20	—	—	—	—	—
Poland totals			108	18	48	66	217	10	2	6	8	18
Russia2 totals			32	2	2	4	38	—	—	—	—	—
Slovakia totals			91	5	17	22	196	11	1	3	4	10
UHL (CoHL) totals			310	41	153	194	292	29	1	6	7	28
