= Evgeny Varlamov =

Russian ice hockey player

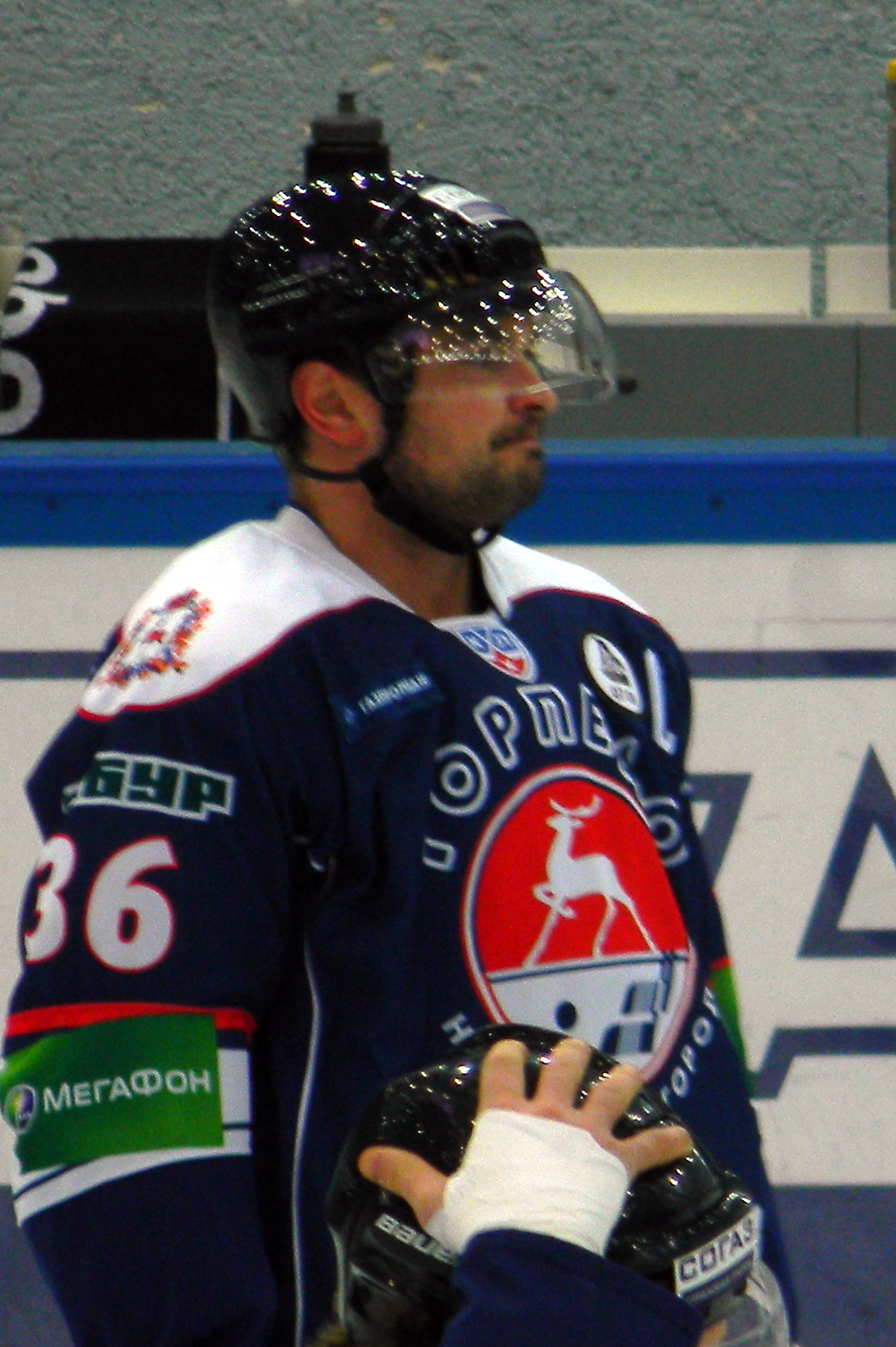
- Born: December 7, 1976 (age 49) Staraya Russa, Russian SFSR, Soviet Union
- Height: 6 ft 0 in (183 cm)
- Weight: 218 lb (99 kg; 15 st 8 lb)
- Position: Defence
- Shot: Right
- Played for: Krylya Sovetov Moscow; Ak Bars Kazan; Metallurg Magnitogorsk; Torpedo Nizhny Novgorod
- Playing career: 1995–2013

Evgeny Viktorovich Varlamov (born December 7, 1976) is a Russian former professional ice hockey defenceman.

Varlamov began his career in Estonia with Tallinna JSK and represented the country in junior level before making six senior international appearances for Russia. He played in the Russian Superleague and Kontinental Hockey League for Krylya Sovetov Moscow, Ak Bars Kazan, Metallurg Magnitogorsk and Torpedo Nizhny Novgorod.

== Career statistics ==
| | | | Regular season | | | | | Playoffs |
| Season | Team | League | GP | G | A | Pts | PIM | GP | G | A | Pts | PIM |
|---|---|---|---|---|---|---|---|---|---|---|---|---|
| 1991–92 | Tallinna JSK | Estonia | — | — | — | — | — | — | — | — | — | — |
| 1992–93 | Tallinna JSK | Estonia | — | — | — | — | — | — | — | — | — | — |
| 1993–94 | JSK/Monstera Tallinn | Estonia | — | — | — | — | — | — | — | — | — | — |
| 1993–94 | Krylya Sovetov Moscow-2 | Russia3 | 16 | 0 | 0 | 0 | 8 | — | — | — | — | — |
| 1994–95 | Monstera Tallinn | Estonia | — | — | — | — | — | — | — | — | — | — |
| 1994–95 | Krylya Sovetov-2 Moscow | Russia2 | 58 | 7 | 5 | 12 | 58 | — | — | — | — | — |
| 1995–96 | Krylya Sovetov Moscow | Russia | 6 | 0 | 0 | 0 | 2 | — | — | — | — | — |
| 1995–96 | Krylya Sovetov-2 Moscow | Russia2 | 46 | 5 | 5 | 10 | 82 | — | — | — | — | — |
| 1996–97 | Krylya Sovetov Moscow | Russia | 39 | 2 | 6 | 8 | 26 | — | — | — | — | — |
| 1996–97 | Krylya Sovetov Moscow-2 | Russia3 | 2 | 0 | 0 | 0 | 4 | — | — | — | — | — |
| 1997–98 | Krylya Sovetov Moscow | Russia | 30 | 1 | 5 | 6 | 40 | — | — | — | — | — |
| 1997–98 | Ak Bars Kazan | Russia | — | — | — | — | — | 5 | 0 | 0 | 0 | 6 |
| 1998–99 | Ak Bars Kazan | Russia | 23 | 1 | 4 | 5 | 16 | 13 | 1 | 1 | 2 | 55 |
| 1998–99 | Ak Bars Kazan-2 | Russia3 | 6 | 1 | 3 | 4 | 10 | — | — | — | — | — |
| 1999–00 | Ak Bars Kazan | Russia | 25 | 2 | 6 | 8 | 59 | 14 | 2 | 0 | 2 | 26 |
| 1999–00 | Ak Bars Kazan-2 | Russia3 | 7 | 0 | 2 | 2 | 6 | — | — | — | — | — |
| 2000–01 | Ak Bars Kazan | Russia | 35 | 5 | 3 | 8 | 117 | 4 | 0 | 0 | 0 | 2 |
| 2001–02 | Ak Bars Kazan | Russia | 30 | 1 | 1 | 2 | 18 | 3 | 0 | 0 | 0 | 2 |
| 2001–02 | Ak Bars Kazan-2 | Russia3 | 5 | 4 | 3 | 7 | 2 | — | — | — | — | — |
| 2002–03 | Ak Bars Kazan | Russia | 31 | 1 | 6 | 7 | 30 | 3 | 0 | 0 | 0 | 0 |
| 2002–03 | Ak Bars Kazan-2 | Russia3 | 1 | 0 | 2 | 2 | 0 | — | — | — | — | — |
| 2003–04 | Metallurg Magnitogorsk | Russia | 50 | 6 | 7 | 13 | 77 | 14 | 1 | 4 | 5 | 8 |
| 2004–05 | Metallurg Magnitogorsk | Russia | 45 | 10 | 15 | 25 | 32 | 5 | 0 | 0 | 0 | 4 |
| 2004–05 | Metallurg Magnitogorsk-2 | Russia3 | 1 | 0 | 1 | 1 | 0 | — | — | — | — | — |
| 2005–06 | Metallurg Magnitogorsk | Russia | 49 | 6 | 10 | 16 | 133 | 8 | 0 | 1 | 1 | 0 |
| 2006–07 | Metallurg Magnitogorsk | Russia | 45 | 9 | 9 | 18 | 75 | 15 | 3 | 8 | 11 | 24 |
| 2007–08 | Metallurg Magnitogorsk | Russia | 52 | 8 | 18 | 26 | 57 | 13 | 2 | 4 | 6 | 34 |
| 2008–09 | Metallurg Magnitogorsk | KHL | 43 | 2 | 16 | 18 | 53 | 8 | 1 | 1 | 2 | 22 |
| 2009–10 | Metallurg Magnitogorsk | KHL | 49 | 4 | 9 | 13 | 40 | 9 | 0 | 2 | 2 | 8 |
| 2010–11 | Metallurg Magnitogorsk | KHL | 41 | 2 | 3 | 5 | 22 | 20 | 2 | 6 | 8 | 12 |
| 2011–12 | Torpedo Nizhny Novgorod | KHL | 47 | 4 | 12 | 16 | 32 | 6 | 1 | 1 | 2 | 35 |
| 2011–12 | Torpedo Nizhny Novgorod | KHL | 24 | 3 | 5 | 8 | 8 | — | — | — | — | — |
| KHL totals | | | 204 | 15 | 45 | 60 | 155 | 43 | 4 | 10 | 14 | 77 |
| Russia totals | | | 460 | 52 | 90 | 142 | 682 | 97 | 9 | 18 | 27 | 161 |
