= 2008–09 Meistriliiga (ice hockey) season =

Estonian national championships in ice hockey

2008–09 Meistriliiga season
- League: Meistriliiga
- Sport: Ice hockey
- Number of teams: 5
- Champion: HK Stars Tallinn

Meistriliiga seasons
- ← 2007–08 2009–10 →

The 2008–09 Meistriliiga season was the 19th season of the Meistriliiga, the top level of ice hockey in Estonia. Five teams participated in the league, and HK Stars Tallinn won the championship.

== Regular season ==
	Club	GP	W	OTW	T	OTL	L	GF–GA	Pts
1.	Tartu Välk 494	21	15	0	0	1	5	141:69	46
2.	HK Stars Tallinn	21	12	1	0	1	7	131:85	39
3.	Narva PSK	21	10	2	0	0	9	106:104	34
4.	Kohtla-Järve Viru Sputnik	21	8	0	0	1	12	89:120	25
5.	Estonian Juniors	12	0	0	0	0	12	37:126	0

== Playoffs ==
=== Semifinals ===
- Narva PSK – HK Stars Tallinn 1:2 (4:3, 2:7, 0:3)
- Tartu Välk 494 – Kohtla-Järve Viru Sputnik 0:2 (4:5, 4:6)

=== 3rd place ===
- Tartu Välk 494 – Narva PSK 7:2

=== Final ===
- HK Stars Tallinn – Kohtla-Järve Viru Sputnik 3:1 (4:5 n.P., 6:4, 11:0, 7:2)
