= 2007–08 Meistriliiga (ice hockey) season =

Estonian national championships in ice hockey

2007–08 Meistriliiga season
- League: Meistriliiga
- Sport: Ice hockey
- Number of teams: 6
- Champion: Tartu Välk 494

Meistriliiga seasons
- ← 2006–07 2008–09 →

The 2007–08 Meistriliiga season was the 18th season of the Meistriliiga, the top level of ice hockey in Estonia. Six teams participated in the league, and Tartu Välk 494 won the championship.

== Standings ==
	Club	GP	W	OTW	T	OTL	L	GF–GA	Pts
1.	Tartu Välk 494	20	16	2	0	0	2	190:51	52
2.	HK Stars Tallinn	20	16	0	0	2	2	176:54	50
3.	Narva PSK	20	13	1	0	0	6	100:66	41
4.	HC Purikad Tallinn	20	7	0	0	0	13	87:132	21
5.	Estonian Juniors	20	4	0	0	0	16	73:163	12
6.	Kohtla-Järve Viru Sputnik	20	1	0	0	1	18	50:210	4
