= Aleksandr Vinogradov (ice hockey) =

Russian ice hockey player

- Born: 20 June 1970 (age 55) Kazan, Soviet Union
- Height: 175 cm (5 ft 9 in)
- Weight: 85 kg (187 lb; 13 st 5 lb)
- Position: Winger
- Shot: Right
- Played for: SK Uritskogo Kazan; Sokol Novocheboksarsk; SKA Saint Petersburg; Luleå HF; Skellefteå AIK; Lyon Hockey Club; ES Weißwasser; HC Vityaz Podolsk; HC Lipetsk; Krylya Sovetov Moscow; HC Sibir Novosibirsk; Tallinna HK Stars
- National team: Russia
- Playing career: 1987–2006

Aleksandr Vinogradov (born 20 June 1970) is a Russian ice hockey player. He competed in the men's tournament at the 1994 Winter Olympics.

== Career statistics ==
=== Regular season and playoffs ===
			Regular season					Playoffs
Season	Team	League	GP	G	A	Pts	PIM	GP	G	A	Pts	PIM
1987–88	SK Uritskogo Kazan	URS.2	2	0	0	0	0	—	—	—	—	—
1988–89	Sokol Novocheboksarsk	URS.3	19	2	0	2	0	—	—	—	—	—
1989–90	SKA–2 Leningrad	URS.3	66	19	13	32	32	—	—	—	—	—
1990–91	SKA Leningrad	URS	20	2	3	5	4	—	—	—	—	—
1990–91	SKA–2 Leningrad	URS.3	4	1	1	2	2	—	—	—	—	—
1991–92	SKA St. Petersburg	CIS.2	54	13	3	16	18	—	—	—	—	—
1991–92	SKA–2 St. Petersburg	CIS.3	2	0	0	0	0	—	—	—	—	—
1992–93	SKA St. Petersburg	IHL	31	8	3	11	14	—	—	—	—	—
1992–93	SKA–2 St. Petersburg	RUS.2	4	2	1	3	2	—	—	—	—	—
1993–94	SKA St. Petersburg	IHL	46	13	10	23	56	6	2	1	3	4
1994–95	SKA St. Petersburg	IHL	46	11	11	22	65	2	0	0	0	28
1994–95	SKA–2 St. Petersburg	RUS.2	4	1	0	1	2	—	—	—	—	—
1995–96	SKA St. Petersburg	IHL	50	16	9	25	26	2	0	0	0	2
1996–97	Luleå HF	SEL	27	4	3	7	41	—	—	—	—	—
1996–97	Skellefteå AIK	SWE.2	10	8	4	12	33	—	—	—	—	—
1997–98	SKA St. Petersburg	RSL	44	7	7	14	36	2	0	0	0	0
1997–98	SKA–2 St. Petersburg	RUS.3	2	4	2	6	0	—	—	—	—	—
1998–99	SKA St. Petersburg	RSL	7	1	0	1	4	—	—	—	—	—
1998–99	SKA–2 St. Petersburg	RUS.3	11	5	7	12	54	—	—	—	—	—
1998–99	LHC Les Lions	FRA	27	16	19	35	64	—	—	—	—	—
1999–2000	LHC Les Lions	FRA	7	2	2	4	8	—	—	—	—	—
1999–2000	ES Weißwasser	DEU.2	40	13	20	33	34	—	—	—	—	—
2000–01	Vityaz Podolsk	RSL	42	5	3	8	52	—	—	—	—	—
2001–02	HC Lipetsk	RUS.2	54	18	20	38	54	12	6	4	10	12
2002–03	Krylya Sovetov Moscow	RSL	19	4	4	8	14	—	—	—	—	—
2003–04	Sibir Novosibirsk	RSL	35	4	7	11	16	—	—	—	—	—
2003–04	Sibir–2 Novosibirsk	RUS.3	2	0	0	0	0	—	—	—	—	—
2004–05	Tallinna HK Stars	EST
2005–06	Tallinna HK Stars	EST
IHL totals			173	48	33	81	161	10	2	1	3	34
RSL totals			147	21	21	42	122	2	0	0	0	0

=== International ===
Year	Team	Event	GP	G	A	Pts	PIM
1994	Russia	OG	8	3	2	5	4
Senior totals			8	3	2	5	4

"Alexander Vinogradov". Elite Prospects.
