= 2017–18 EML season =

Estonian national championships in ice hockey

- League: Meistriliiga
- Sport: Ice hockey
- Duration: 30 September 2017 – 24 March 2018
- Number of games: 46
- Number of teams: 4

Regular season
- Season champions: HC Viking

Finals
- Champions: HC Viking
- Runners-up: Tartu Kalev-Välk

Meistriliiga seasons
- ← 2016–17 2018–19 →

The 2017–18 EML season (also known as the Nordic Power Hokiliiga for sponsorship reasons) was the 78th season of the Meistriliiga, the top level of ice hockey in Estonia. The season began on 30 September 2017 and concluded on 24 March 2018, with HC Viking winning the Estonian Championship over Tartu Kalev-Välk in four games.

== Teams ==
Team	City	Arena	Capacity
HC Viking	Tallinn	Tondiraba Ice Hall	7,700
HC Vipers	Tallinn	Tondiraba Ice Hall	7,700
Narva PSK	Narva	Narva Ice Hall	1,300
Tartu Kalev-Välk	Tartu	Lõunakeskus Ice Hall	

== Regular season ==
=== League table ===
Pos	Team	Pld	W	OTW	OTL	L	GF	GA	GD	Pts
1	HC Viking	18	11	0	1	6	86	75	+11	34
2	Tartu Kalev-Välk	18	10	1	1	6	79	53	+26	33
3	Narva PSK	18	8	0	1	9	81	86	−5	25
4	HC Vipers	18	4	2	0	12	70	102	−32	16

Source: Estonian Ice Hockey Association
Rules for classification: 1) points; 2) head-to-head points; 3) head-to-head goal difference; 4) head-to-head number of goals scored; 5) result against closest best-ranked team outside tied teams; 6) result against second-best ranked team outside tied teams; 7) seeding before tournament.

== Playoffs ==
=== Bracket ===
Semi-finals
1	HC Viking	2
4	HC Vipers	1
2	Tartu Kalev-Välk	2
3	Narva PSK	0

Finals
1	HC Viking	3
2	Tartu Kalev-Välk	1
Third place
3	Narva PSK	0
4	HC Vipers	1
