= 2003–04 Meistriliiga (ice hockey) season =

Estonian national championships in ice hockey

The 2003–04 Meistriliiga season was the 14th season of the Meistriliiga, the top level of ice hockey in Estonia. Five teams participated in the league, and HK Panter-Hansa Sport Tallinn won the championship.

== Regular season ==
	Club	GP	W	T	L	GF–GA	Pts
1.	Tartu Välk 494	16	14	2	0	99:30	30
2.	HK Stars Tallinn	16	10	2	4	88:49	22
3.	HC Panter-Hansa Sport Tallinn	16	5	4	7	57:62	14
4.	PSK Narva	16	6	1	9	44:61	13
5.	Kohtla-Järve Viru Sputnik	16	0	1	15	29:115	1

== Playoffs ==
=== Semifinals ===
- Tartu Välk 494 - PSK Narva 1:2 (3:0, 0:4, 1:3)
- HK Stars Tallinn - HC Panter-Hansa Sport Tallinn 3:4

=== 3rd place ===
- Tartu Välk 494 - HK Stars Tallinn 6:9

=== Final ===
- HC Panter-Hansa Sport Tallinn - PSK Narva 2:1 (0:2, 6:3, 5:2)
