= 2000–01 Meistriliiga (ice hockey) season =

Estonian national championships in ice hockey

The 2000–01 Meistriliiga season was the 11th season of the Meistriliiga, the top level of ice hockey in Estonia. Four teams participated in the league, and HK Narva 2000 won the championship.

== Standings ==
	Club	GP	W	T	L	GF–GA	Pts
1.	HK Narva 2000	18	14	1	3	102:47	29
2.	Tartu Välk 494	18	12	2	4	90:50	26
3.	HK Central Kohtla-Järve	18	7	1	10	86:88	15
4.	HC Tallinna Jeti	18	1	0	17	40:133	2
