= 2016–17 Meistriliiga (ice hockey) season =

Estonian national championships in ice hockey

2016–17 Meistriliiga season
- League: Meistriliiga
- Sport: Ice hockey
- Duration: 22 October 2016 – 25 March 2017
- Number of teams: 4
- TV partner(s): Delfi TV
- Season champions: HC Viking
- Finals champions: Narva PSK
- Runners-up: HC Viking

Meistriliiga seasons
- ← 2015–16 2017–18 →

The 2016–17 Meistriliiga season was the 77th season of the Meistriliiga, the top level of ice hockey in Estonia. The season began on 22 October 2016 and ended on 25 March 2017 with Narva PSK winning their 18th Estonian Championship trophy.

== Teams ==
Team	City	Arena	Capacity
Estonia Junior Team	Tallinn		
HC Tallinn	Tallinn	Škoda Ice Hall	1,000
HC Viking	Tallinn	Tondiraba Ice Hall	7,700
Narva PSK	Narva	Narva Ice Hall	1,300

== Regular season ==
=== League table ===
Pos	Team	Pld	W	OTW	OTL	L	GF	GA	GD	Pts	Qualification
1	HC Viking	12	9	0	0	3	95	42	+53	27	Advance to Finals
2	HC Tallinn	12	7	0	0	5	74	54	+20	21	Advance to Semifinals
3	Narva PSK	12	7	0	0	5	71	54	+17	21	Advance to Semifinals
4	Estonia Junior Team	12	1	0	0	11	37	127	−90	3	

Updated to match(es) played on unknown. Source: Estonian Ice Hockey Association
Rules for classification: 1) points; 2) head-to-head points; 3) head-to-head goal difference; 4) head-to-head number of goals scored; 5) result against closest best-ranked team outside tied teams; 6) result against second-best ranked team outside tied teams; 7) seeding before tournament.

== Playoffs ==
=== Bracket ===
Semifinal			Final
			1	HC Viking	1
2	HC Tallinn	0	3	Narva PSK	3
3	Narva PSK	2
