= 2005–06 Meistriliiga (ice hockey) season =

Estonian national championships in ice hockey

The 2005–06 Meistriliiga season was the 16th season of the Meistriliiga, the top level of ice hockey in Estonia. Five teams participated in the league, and HK Stars Tallinn won the championship.

== Regular season ==
	Club	GP	W	OTW	T	OTL	L	GF–GA	Pts
1.	Tartu Välk 494	16	11	0	0	0	5	91:49	33
2.	HK Stars Tallinn	16	11	0	0	0	5	92:57	33
3.	HC Panter Tallinn	16	10	0	0	1	5	84:48	31
4.	Narva PSK	16	7	1	0	0	8	75:79	23
5.	Kohtla-Järve Viru Sputnik	16	0	0	0	0	16	21:130	0

== Playoffs ==
=== Semifinals ===
- Tartu Välk 494 - Narva PSK 2:0 (11:2, 9:1)
- HK Stars Tallinn - HC Panter Tallinn 2:0 (6:3, 8:3)

=== 3rd place ===
- HC Panter Tallinn - Narva PSK 2:0 (6:0, 4:2)

=== Final ===
- Tartu Välk 494 - HK Stars Tallinn 0:3 (2:6, 5:6, 1:6)
