= List of ice hockey teams in Estonia =

This is the list of ice hockey teams operating (or was operated) in Estonia. The list is incomplete.

Name	Location	Home arena	Further info	Image
HC Everest				
KSK Tiigrid Tallinn	Tallinn			
Kohtla-Järve Viru Sputnik				
Narva PSK				
HC Viking Tallinn				
HC Vipers Tallinn				

== Unsorted ==
- ATP Kohtla-Järve
- Central Kohtla-Järve (HK Central Kohtla-Järve)
- Dünamo Tallinn (HC Dünamo Tallinn)
- Estonian Juniors
- Dünamo Tartu (HC Dünamo Tartu)
- Jõgeva HK (HK Jõgeva)
- Karud HK (HK Karud)
- Karud-Monstera Tallinn (HK Karud-Monstera Tallinn, JSK Monstera Tallinn, Monstera Tallinn, SK Monstera)
- Kohtla-Järve Central
- Kohtla-Järve ChC
- Kohtla-Järve HK Keemik (Keemik Kohtla-Järve)
- Narva LNSK (LNSK Narva)
- Ordo Narva (SK Ordo Narva) (ice sledge hockey club)
- Sillamäe Kalev (HC Sillamäe Kalev)
- Sokol Tallinn (HC Sokol Tallinn)
- Talleks Tallinn (Tallinn Talleks)
- Tallinn Ekskavaator
- Tallinn LTM
- Tallinn Sport
- Tallinn Taksopark
- Tallinn Tempo
- Tallinna Eagles (HC Eagles Tallinn)
- Tallinna Hokitsenter
- Tallinna Jeti (HC Tallinna Jeti)
- Tallinna JSK
- Tallinna Viiking Sport (HC Tallinna Viiking Sport)
- Tartu ASK
- Tartu Hokiklubi (Hokiklubi Tartu, HK Tartu)
- Tartu Linnameeskond (Linnameeskond Tartu)
- THK-88 Tallinn
- Vipers Tallinn (HK Vipers Tallinn, HK Vipers)
- Visa-Tiigrid Tallinn (HC Visa-Tiigrid Tallinn)
- YSK Tallinn
