= 2006–07 Meistriliiga (ice hockey) season =

Estonian national championships in ice hockey

The 2006–07 Meistriliiga season was the 17th season of the Meistriliiga, the top level of ice hockey in Estonia. Five teams participated in the league, and HK Stars Tallinn won the championship.

== Regular season ==
	Club	GP	W	OTW	T	OTL	L	GF–GA	Pts
1.	HK Stars Tallinn	24	20	0	0	1	3	154:71	61
2.	Tartu Välk 494	24	16	0	1	0	7	193:76	49
3.	Narva PSK	24	14	0	1	0	9	118:80	43
4.	Tallinna Eagles	24	8	1	0	0	15	100:99	26
5.	Kohtla-Järve Viru Sputnik	24	0	0	0	0	24	38:277	0

== Playoffs ==
=== Quarterfinals ===
- Kohtla-Järve Viru Sputnik - Tartu Välk 494 0:2 (0:20, 4:22)
- Tallinna Eagles - Narva PSK 0:2 (4:5, 1:3)

=== Semifinals ===
- Narva PSK - Tartu Välk 494 2:0 (3:2, 7:3)

=== Final ===
- HK Stars Tallinn - Narva PSK 2:1 (1:7, 4:2, 3:2)
