= 2018–19 EML season =

Estonian national championships in ice hockey

- League: Meistriliiga
- Sport: Ice hockey
- Duration: 29 September 2018 – 9 March 2019
- Number of teams: 4

Championship
- Season champions: Välk 494

Cup

Meistriliiga seasons
- ← 2017–18 2019–20 →

The 2018–19 EML season (also known as the Coolbet Hokiliiga for sponsorship reasons) was the 79th season of the Meistriliiga, the top level of ice hockey in Estonia. The season began on 29 September 2018.

== Teams ==
Team	City	Arena	Capacity
HC Everest Kohtla-Järve	Kohtla-Järve	Kohtla-Järve Ice Hall	700
Narva PSK	Narva	Narva Ice Hall	1,300
Tallinna Kalev/Viking	Tallinn	Tondiraba Ice Hall	7,700
Välk 494	Tartu	Lõunakeskus Ice Hall	

== Championship ==
=== League table ===
Pos	Team	Pld	W	OTW	OTL	L	GF	GA	GD	Pts
1	Välk 494	18	15	1	0	2	143	44	+99	47
2	Tallinna Kalev/Viking	18	10	0	2	6	94	76	+18	32
3	Narva PSK	18	6	3	0	9	73	104	−31	24
4	HC Everest Kohtla-Järve	18	1	0	2	15	48	134	−86	5

Source: Estonian Ice Hockey Association
Rules for classification: 1) points; 2) head-to-head points; 3) head-to-head goal difference; 4) head-to-head number of goals scored; 5) result against closest best-ranked team outside tied teams; 6) result against second-best ranked team outside tied teams; 7) seeding before tournament.

== Cup ==
=== Bracket ===
Semi-finals
1	Välk 494	3
4	HC Everest	0
2	Tallinna Kalev/Viking	1
3	Narva PSK	3

Finals
1	Välk 494	2
3	Narva PSK	0
