= 1997–98 Meistriliiga (ice hockey) season =

Estonian national championships in ice hockey

The 1997–98 Meistriliiga season was the eighth season of the Meistriliiga, the top level of ice hockey in Estonia. Five teams participated in the league, and Kreenholm Narva won the championship.

== Regular season ==
	Club	GP	W	T	L	GF–GA	Pts
1.	Tartu Välk 494	24	20	2	2	197:53	42
2.	Kreenholm Narva	24	20	2	2	160:150	42
3.	Central Kohtla-Järve	24	12	0	12	146:82	24
4.	THK-88 Tallinn	24	4	0	20	47:203	8
5.	KSK Tiigrid Tallinn	24	2	0	22	55:217	4

== Final ==
- Tartu Välk 494 - Kreenholm Narva 3:4 OT
