= 2004–05 Meistriliiga (ice hockey) season =

Estonian national championships in ice hockey

The 2004–05 Meistriliiga season was the 15th season of the Meistriliiga, the top level of ice hockey in Estonia. Five teams participated in the league, and HK Stars Tallinn won the championship.

== Regular season ==
	Club	GP	W	OTW	L	OTL	L	GF–GA	Pts
1.	Tartu Välk 494	16	11	0	3	1	1	89:37	37
2.	HC Panter Tallinn	16	8	1	2	1	4	72:46	29
3.	Narva PSK	16	8	1	2	0	5	68:45	28
4.	HK Stars Tallinn	16	7	0	1	0	8	80:61	22
5.	Kohtla-Järve Viru Sputnik	16	0	0	0	0	16	27:147	0

== Playoffs ==
=== Semifinals ===
- Tartu Välk 494 – HK Stars Tallinn 1:2 (2:1, 2:4, 0:1)
- HC Panter Tallinn – Narva PSK 2:1 (4:3, 0:2, 3:1)

=== 3rd place ===
- Tartu Välk 494 – Narva PSK 1:2 (3:1, 2:5, 3:4)

=== Final ===
- HC Panter Tallinn – HK Stars Tallinn 1:3 (6:3, 3:5, 4:5 n.P., 2:5)
