= 2010–11 Meistriliiga (ice hockey) season =

Estonian national championships in ice hockey

2011–12 Meistriliiga season
- League: Meistriliiga
- Sport: Ice hockey
- Number of teams: 3
- Champion: Tartu Välk 494

Meistriliiga seasons
- ← 2009–10 2011–12 →

The 2010–11 Meistriliiga season was the 21st season of the Meistriliiga, the top level of ice hockey in Estonia. Three teams participated in the league, and Tartu Välk 494 won the championship.

== Regular season ==
	Club	GP	W	OTW	T	OTL	L	GF–GA	Pts
1.	Kohtla-Järve Viru Sputnik	12	11	0	0	0	1	74:57	30
2.	Tartu Välk 494	12	6	0	0	0	6	69:61	25
3.	HK TTK-GMP Tallinn	12	1	0	0	0	11	66:91	17

== Final ==
- Kohtla-Järve Viru Sputnik – Tartu Välk 494 2:3 (9:8 SO, 2:3, 11:2, 5:6, 3:5)
