= 2011–12 Meistriliiga (ice hockey) season =

Estonian national championships in ice hockey

2011–12 Meistriliiga season
- League: Meistriliiga
- Sport: Ice hockey
- Number of teams: 5
- Champion: Tartu Kalev-Välk

Meistriliiga seasons
- ← 2010–11 2012–13 →

The 2011–12 Meistriliiga season was the 22nd season of the Meistriliiga, the top level of ice hockey in Estonia. Five teams participated in the league, and Tartu Kalev-Välk won the championship.

== Regular season ==
| | Club | GP | W | OTW | OTL | L | GF–GA | Pts |
|---|---|---|---|---|---|---|---|---|
| 1. | Tartu Kalev-Välk | 16 | 14 | 0 | 0 | 2 | 101:44 | 42 |
| 2. | HC Panter-Purikad | 16 | 11 | 1 | 0 | 4 | 75:64 | 35 |
| 3. | Kohtla-Järve Viru Sputnik | 16 | 7 | 1 | 0 | 8 | 77:80 | 23 |
| 4. | Tallinn Viking Sport | 16 | 5 | 0 | 1 | 10 | 49:66 | 16 |
| 5. | Narva PSK | 16 | 1 | 0 | 1 | 14 | 51:99 | 4 |

== Playoffs ==
=== Semifinals ===
- Tartu Kalev-Välk – Tallinn Viking Sport 3:1 (1:3, 4:2, 4:1, 5:3)
- Kohtla-Järve Viru Sputnik – HC Panter-Purikad 3:0 (6:2, 5:2, 8:1)

=== 3rd place ===
- HC Panter-Purikad – Tallinn Viking Sport 0:2 (one game only)

=== Final ===
- Tartu Kalev-Välk – Kohtla-Järve Viru Sputnik 3:1 (3:2, 1:2, 8:2, 5:3)
