= Estonian Ice Hockey Association =

Sports governing body in Estonia

Estonia
- Association name: Eesti Jäähokiliit
- IIHF Code: EST
- Founded: 1935
- President: Rauno Parras
- IIHF men's ranking: 28
- IIHF women's ranking: 40

The Estonian Ice Hockey Association (Estonian: Eesti Jäähokliit) is the national governing body of ice hockey in Estonia. Estonian membership in the International Ice Hockey Federation dated back to the 1930s, which had expired after the annexation of these countries by the Soviet Union in 1940 and 1945 respectively, was renewed after their sovereignty was re-established in the 1990s.

The main task of the Ice Hockey Association is to popularize and develop ice hockey in the Republic of Estonia.

There are 14 clubs, 1,303 players (125 of them play in Unibet Hokiliiga), 10 indoor ice arenas and 23 outdoor ice rinks in the country.

26 referees officiating the games of the Estonian championship in all age classes.

The largest arena: Tondiraba (the main arena holds 5,840 spectators) in Tallinn.

== Unibet Hokiliiga ==
Unibet Hokiliiga is the top-tier ice hockey league in Estonia. The league consists of five teams. Regular season 2023–24 results:

1. Narva PSK
2. Välk 494
3. Viru Sputnik
4. HC Everest
5. HC Panter

#	Team	P	W	OT W	OT L	L	GF	GA	Diff	P
1	Narva PSK	16	13	1	0	2	102	51	51	28
2	Välk 494	16	11	0	0	5	121	75	46	22
3	Viru Sputnik	16	9	0	1	6	76	83	−7	19
4	HC Everest	16	5	0	0	11	60	97	−37	10
5	HC Panter	16	1	0	0	15	41	94	−53	2

== See also ==
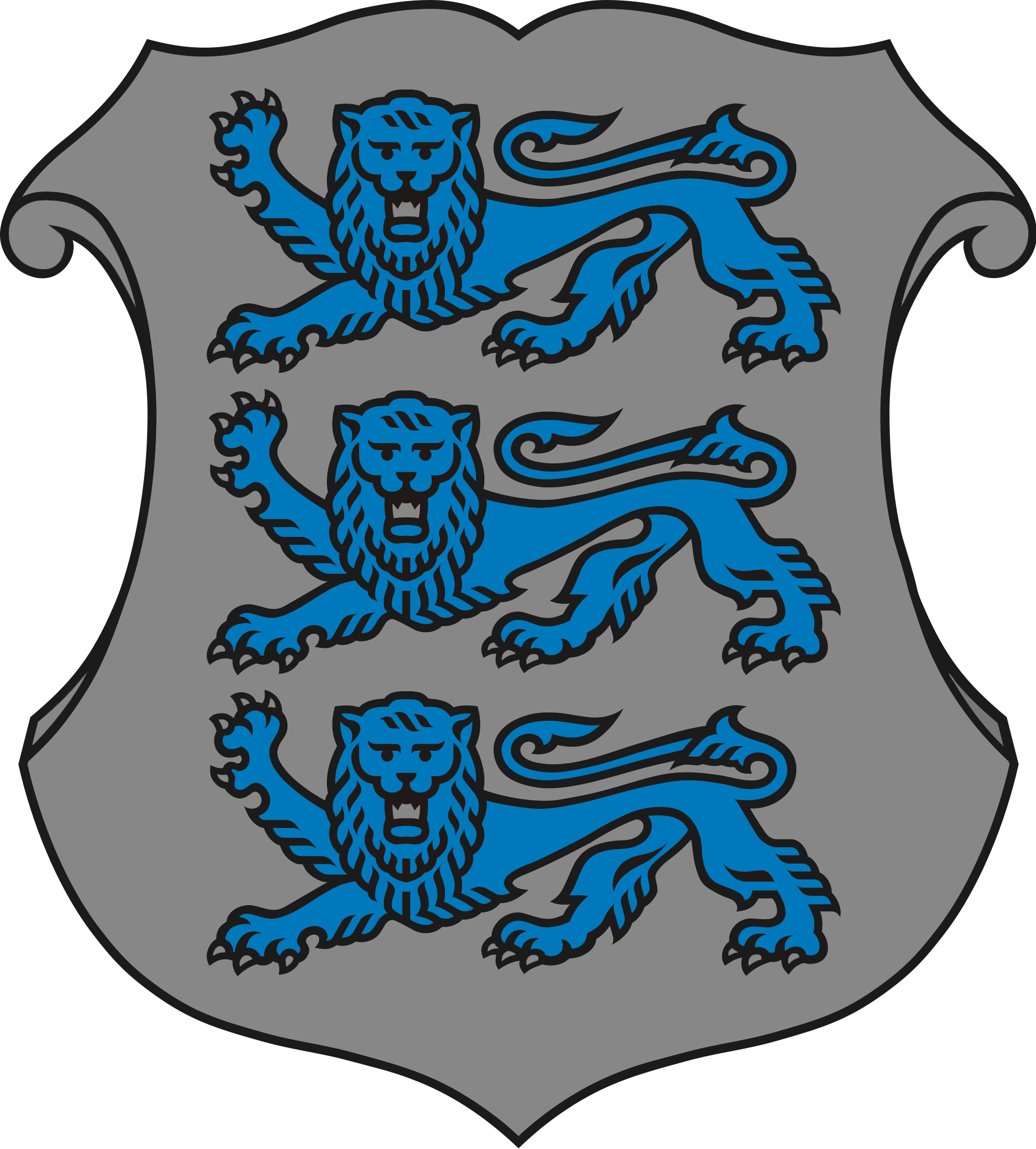
Former Estonia national ice hockey team logo.

- Estonia men's national ice hockey team
- Estonia men's national junior ice hockey team
- Estonia men's national under-18 ice hockey team
- Estonia women's national ice hockey team
- List of ice hockey teams in Estonia
