= 1999–2000 Meistriliiga (ice hockey) season =

Estonian national championships in ice hockey

The 1999–00 Meistriliiga season was the tenth season of the Meistriliiga, the top level of ice hockey in Estonia. Four teams participated in the league, and Tartu Valk 494 won the championship.

== Standings ==
	Club	GP	W	T	L	GF–GA	Pts
1.	Tartu Välk 494	18	15	1	2	102:39	31
2.	HK Narva 2000	18	12	1	5	88:48	25
3.	Kohtla-Järve Central	18	8	0	10	72:88	16
4.	HC Tallinna Viiking Sport	18	0	0	18	26:113	0
