= Andrei Gavrilov (ice hockey) =

Russian ice hockey player

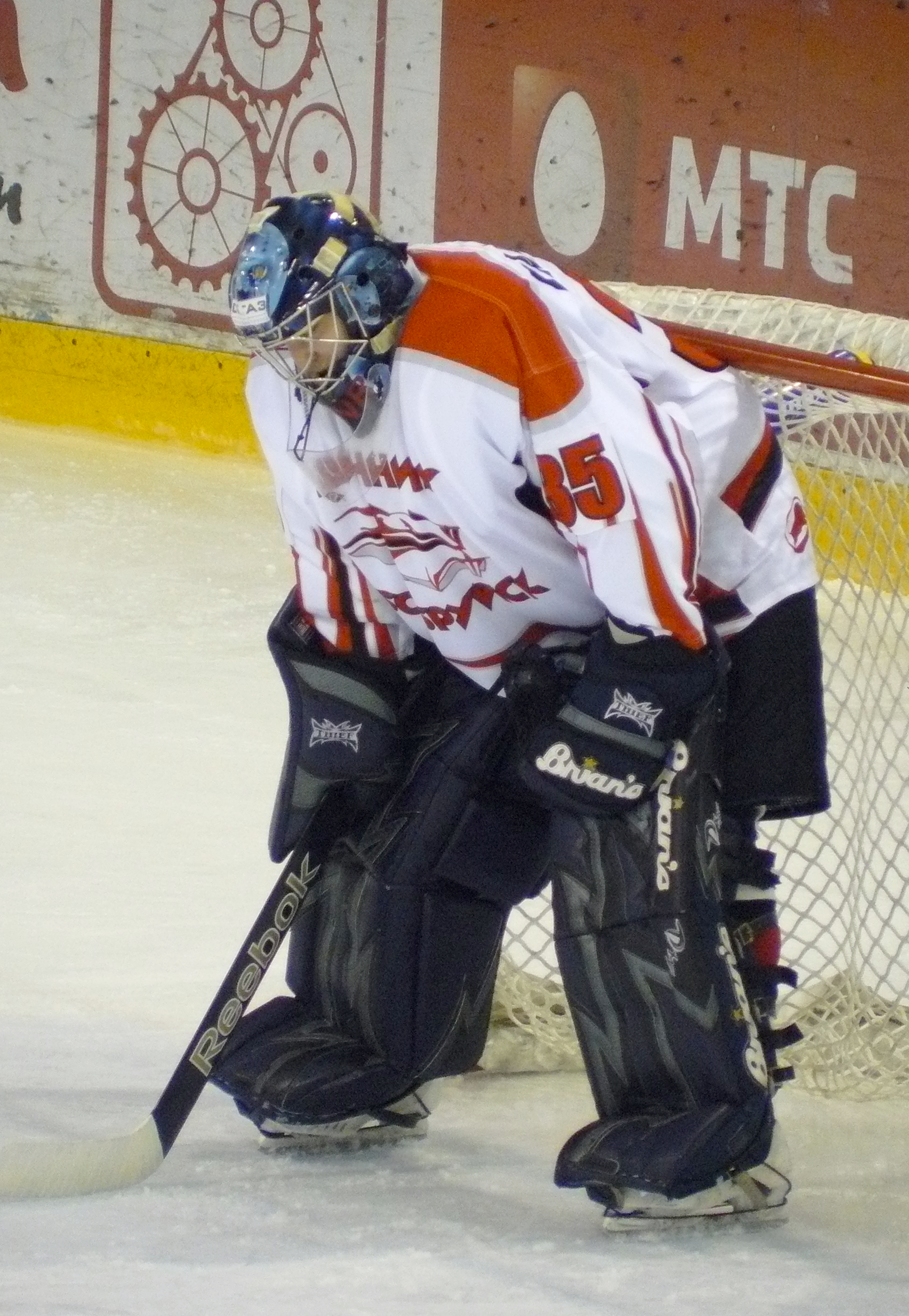
- Born: November 8, 1987 (age 37); St. Petersburg, Russian SFSR
- Height: 6 ft 2 in (188 cm)
- Weight: 207 lb (94 kg; 14 st 11 lb)
- Position: Goaltender
- Catches: Left
- EHL team Former teams: Everest Kohtla-Järve; HC Vityaz Podolsk; Atlant Moscow Oblast; HC Sochi; Salavat Yulaev Ufa
- Playing career: 2006–present

Andrei Gavrilov (born November 8, 1987) is a Russian professional ice hockey goaltender who currently plays for Everest Kohtla-Järve of the Estonian Hockey League (EHL). He has previously played with HC Vityaz Podolsk, Atlant Moscow Oblast, HC Sochi and Salavat Yulaev Ufa in the Kontinental Hockey League (KHL). He joined Salavat Yulaev on a one-year contract as a free agent on July 29, 2016.
