= 1997–98 IIHF Continental Cup =

The Continental Cup 1997–98 was the first edition of the IIHF Continental Cup. The season started on September 19, 1997, and finished on December 28, 1997.

The tournament was won by HC Košice, who won the final group.

== Preliminary round ==
=== Group A ===
(Székesfehérvár, Hungary)

Team #1	Score	Team #2
Alba Volán Székesfehérvár (Hungary)	11:2	(Spain) FC Barcelona
HK Sportina Bled (Slovenia)	13:0	(Spain) FC Barcelona
Alba Volán Székesfehérvár (Hungary)	6:5	(Slovenia) HK Sportina Bled

=== Group A standings ===
Rank	Team	Points
1	(Hungary) Alba Volán Székesfehérvár	4
2	(Slovenia) HK Sportina Bled	2
3	(Spain) FC Barcelona	0

=== Group B ===
(Jesenice, Slovenia)

Team #1	Score	Team #2
KS Unia Oświęcim (Poland)	9:2	(Croatia) KHL Medveščak
HK Acroni Jesenice (Slovenia)	5:2	(Croatia) KHL Medveščak
HK Acroni Jesenice (Slovenia)	2:3	(Poland) KS Unia Oświęcim

=== Group B standings ===
Rank	Team	Points
1	(Poland) KS Unia Oświęcim	4
2	(Slovenia) HK Acroni Jesenice	2
3	(Croatia) KHL Medveščak	0

=== Group C ===
(Belgrade, Yugoslavia)

Team #1	Score	Team #2
Dunaferr SE (Hungary)	8:2	(Spain) CH Jaca
KHK Crvena zvezda (Federal Republic of Yugoslavia)	3:18	(Hungary) Dunaferr SE
KHK Crvena zvezda (Federal Republic of Yugoslavia)	4:7	(Spain) CH Jaca

=== Group C standings ===
Rank	Team	Points
1	(Hungary) Dunaferr SE	4
2	(Spain) CH Jaca	2
3	(Federal Republic of Yugoslavia) KHK Crvena zvezda	0

=== Group D ===
(Riga, Latvia)

Team #1	Score	Team #2
Tivali Minsk (Belarus)	11:2	(Lithuania) SC Energija
Juniors Riga (Latvia)	12:0	(Estonia) Kohtla-Järve Viru Sputnik
Tivali Minsk (Belarus)	4:2	(Estonia) Kohtla-Järve Viru Sputnik
Juniors Riga (Latvia)	7:1	(Lithuania) SC Energija
SC Energija (Lithuania)	4:2	(Estonia) Kohtla-Järve Viru Sputnik
Juniors Riga (Latvia)	1:1	(Belarus) Tivali Minsk

=== Group D standings ===
Rank	Team	Points	DIF
1	(Latvia) Juniors Riga	5	+18
2	(Belarus) Tivali Minsk	5	+11
3	(Lithuania) SC Energija	2	
4	(Estonia) Kohtla-Järve Viru Sputnik	0	

=== Group E ===
(Miercurea Ciuc, Romania)

Team #1	Score	Team #2
Lions Jerusalem (Israel)	5:3	(Bulgaria) HC Slavia Sofia
SC Miercurea Ciuc (Romania)	11:0	(Turkey) Ankara Büyükşehir
HC Slavia Sofia (Bulgaria)	12:0	(Turkey) Ankara Büyükşehir
SC Miercurea Ciuc (Romania)	7:2	(Israel) Lions Jerusalem
Lions Jerusalem (Israel)	6:2	(Turkey) Ankara Büyükşehir
SC Miercurea Ciuc (Romania)	4:1	(Bulgaria) HC Slavia Sofia

=== Group E standings ===
Rank	Team	Points
1	(Romania) SC Miercurea Ciuc	6
2	(Israel) Lions Jerusalem	4
3	(Bulgaria) HC Slavia Sofia	2
4	(Turkey) Ankara Büyükşehir	0

== First Group Stage ==
=== Group F ===
(Herning, Denmark)

Team #1	Score	Team #2
Vålerenga (Norway)	4:3	(France) Reims HC
Herning IK (Denmark)	3:4	(Hungary) Alba Volán Székesfehérvár
Vålerenga (Norway)	11:1	(Hungary) Alba Volán Székesfehérvár
Herning IK (Denmark)	2:2	(France) Reims HC
Reims HC (France)	8:6	(Hungary) Alba Volán Székesfehérvár
Herning IK (Denmark)	2:2	(Norway) Vålerenga

=== Group F standings ===
Rank	Team	Points
1	(Norway) Vålerenga	5
2	(France) Reims HC	3
3	(Hungary) Alba Volán Székesfehérvár	2
4	(Denmark) Herning IK	2

=== Group G ===
(Nijmegen, Netherlands)

Team #1	Score	Team #2
Tilburg Trappers (Netherlands)	3:4	(Norway) Trondheim Black Panthers
Van Heumen Tigers Nijmegen (Netherlands)	7:6	(Denmark) Esbjerg IK
Trondheim Black Panthers (Norway)	4:2	(Denmark) Esbjerg IK
Van Heumen Tigers Nijmegen (Netherlands)	2:5	(Netherlands) Tilburg Trappers
Tilburg Trappers (Netherlands)	3:3	(Denmark) Esbjerg IK
Van Heumen Tigers Nijmegen (Netherlands)	1:1	(Norway) Trondheim Black Panthers

=== Group G standings ===
Rank	Team	Points
1	(Norway) Trondheim Black Panthers	5
2	(Netherlands) Tilburg Trappers	3
3	(Netherlands) Van Heumen Tigers Nijmegen	3
4	(Denmark) Esbjerg IK	1

=== Group H ===
(Ljubljana, Slovenia)

Team #1	Score	Team #2
EC KAC (Austria)	5:3	(Hungary) Ferencvárosi TC
HDD Olimpija Ljubljana (Slovenia)	1:7	(Poland) KS Unia Oświęcim
EC KAC (Austria)	3:3	(Poland) KS Unia Oświęcim
HDD Olimpija Ljubljana (Slovenia)	2:2	(Hungary) Ferencvárosi TC
KS Unia Oświęcim (Poland)	4:0	(Hungary) Ferencvárosi TC
HDD Olimpija Ljubljana (Slovenia)	0:9	(Austria) EC KAC

=== Group H standings ===
Rank	Team	Points	GF
1	(Austria) EC KAC	5	17
2	(Poland) KS Unia Oświęcim	5	14
3	(Hungary) Ferencvárosi TC	1	
4	(Slovenia) HDD Olimpija Ljubljana	1	

=== Group J ===
(Nowy Targ, Poland)

Team #1	Score	Team #2
ŠKP Poprad (Slovakia)	6:6	(Hungary) Dunaferr SE
Podhale Nowy Targ (Poland)	3:2	(Latvia) Essamika Ogre
ŠKP Poprad (Slovakia)	9:2	(Latvia) Essamika Ogre
Podhale Nowy Targ (Poland)	4:1	(Hungary) Dunaferr SE
Dunaferr SE (Hungary)	8:1	(Latvia) Essamika Ogre
Podhale Nowy Targ (Poland)	4:3	(Slovakia) ŠKP Poprad

=== Group J standings ===
Rank	Team	Points
1	(Poland) Podhale Nowy Targ	6
2	(Slovakia) ŠKP Poprad	3
3	(Hungary) Dunaferr SE	3
4	(Latvia) Essamika Ogre	0

=== Group K ===
(Tartu, Estonia)

Team #1	Score	Team #2
Juniors Riga (Latvia)	2:1	(Ukraine) Sokil Kiev
Tartu Kalev-Välk (Estonia)	6:2	(Romania) SC Miercurea Ciuc
Sokil Kiev (Ukraine)	4:0	(Romania) SC Miercurea Ciuc
Tartu Kalev-Välk (Estonia)	2:2	(Latvia) Juniors Riga
Juniors Riga (Latvia)	10:2	(Romania) SC Miercurea Ciuc
Tartu Kalev-Välk (Estonia)	2:6	(Ukraine) Sokil Kiev

=== Group K standings ===
Rank	Team	Points
1	(Latvia) Juniors Riga	5
2	(Ukraine) Sokil Kiev	4
3	(Estonia) Tartu Kalev-Välk	3
4	(Romania) SC Miercurea Ciuc	0

=== Group L ===
(Magnitogorsk, Russia)

Team #1	Score	Team #2
Metallurg Magnitogorsk (Russia)	5:1	(Russia) Avangard Omsk
Avangard Omsk (Russia)	6:2	(Kazakhstan) Torpedo Ust-Kamenogorsk
Metallurg Magnitogorsk (Russia)	3:1	(Kazakhstan) Torpedo Ust-Kamenogorsk

=== Group L standings ===
Rank	Team	Points
1	(Russia) Metallurg Magnitogorsk	4
2	(Russia) Avangard Omsk	2
3	(Kazakhstan) Torpedo Ust-Kamenogorsk	0

(Germany) Eisbären Berlin, (France) Grenoble MH, (Slovakia) HC Košice, (Czech Republic) HC Železárny Třinec, (Belarus) Polymir Novopolotsk, (Russia) Salavat Yulaev Ufa, : bye

== Second Group Stage ==
=== Group M ===
(Berlin, Germany)

Team #1	Score	Team #2
Grenoble MH (France)	3:2	(Norway) Vålerenga
Eisbären Berlin (Germany)	7:0	(Norway) Trondheim Black Panthers
Vålerenga (Norway)	8:3	(Norway) Trondheim Black Panthers
Eisbären Berlin (Germany)	3:2	(France) Grenoble MH
Grenoble MH (France)	15:3	(Norway) Trondheim Black Panthers
Eisbären Berlin (Germany)	4:1	(Norway) Vålerenga

=== Group M standings ===
Rank	Team	Points
1	(Germany) Eisbären Berlin	6
2	(France) Grenoble MH	4
3	(Norway) Vålerenga	2
4	(Norway) Trondheim Black Panthers	0

=== Group N ===
(Třinec, Czech Republic)

Team #1	Score	Team #2
HC Košice (Slovakia)	5:1	(Poland) Podhale Nowy Targ
HC Železárny Třinec (Czech Republic)	10:2	(Austria) EC KAC
HC Košice (Slovakia)	2:2	(Austria) EC KAC
HC Železárny Třinec (Czech Republic)	0:5	(Poland) Podhale Nowy Targ
EC KAC (Austria)	4:3	(Poland) Podhale Nowy Targ
HC Železárny Třinec (Czech Republic)	1:2	(Slovakia) HC Košice

=== Group N standings ===
Rank	Team	Points
1	(Slovakia) HC Košice	5
2	(Austria) EC KAC	3
3	(Poland) Podhale Nowy Targ	2
4	(Czech Republic) HC Železárny Třinec	2

=== Group O ===
(Novopolotsk, Belarus)

Team #1	Score	Team #2
Salavat Yulaev Ufa (Russia)	3:2	(Russia) Metallurg Magnitogorsk
Polymir Novopolotsk (Belarus)	2:5	(Latvia) Juniors Riga
Salavat Yulaev Ufa (Russia)	2:0	(Latvia) Juniors Riga
Polymir Novopolotsk (Belarus)	1:4	(Russia) Metallurg Magnitogorsk
Metallurg Magnitogorsk (Russia)	7:3	(Latvia) Juniors Riga
Polymir Novopolotsk (Belarus)	2:5	(Russia) Salavat Yulaev Ufa

=== Group O standings ===
Rank	Team	Points
1	(Russia) Salavat Yulaev Ufa	6
2	(Russia) Metallurg Magnitogorsk	4
3	(Latvia) Juniors Riga	2
4	(Belarus) Polymir Novopolotsk	0

(Finland) Ilves : bye

== Final Group Stage ==
(Tampere, Finland)

Team #1	Score	Team #2
HC Košice (Slovakia)	5:2	(Germany) Eisbären Berlin
Ilves (Finland)	6:3	(Russia) Salavat Yulaev Ufa
HC Košice (Slovakia)	2:2	(Russia) Salavat Yulaev Ufa
Ilves (Finland)	4:5	(Germany) Eisbären Berlin
Eisbären Berlin (Germany)	4:3	(Russia) Salavat Yulaev Ufa
Ilves (Finland)	4:5	(Slovakia) HC Košice

=== Final Group standings ===
Rank	Team	Points
1	(Slovakia) HC Košice	5
2	(Germany) Eisbären Berlin	4
3	(Finland) Ilves	2
4	(Russia) Salavat Yulaev Ufa	1
