= 1998–99 Meistriliiga (ice hockey) season =

Ninth season of the Meistriliiga, the top level of ice hockey in Estonia

The 1998–99 Meistriliiga season was the ninth season of the Meistriliiga, the top level of ice hockey in Estonia. Four teams participated in the league, and Tartu Valk 494 won the championship.

== Standings ==
	Club	GP	W	T	L	GF–GA	Pts
1.	Tartu Välk 494	24	19	2	3	142:68	40
2.	HK Narva 2000	24	15	2	7	104:76	32
3.	Tallinna Hokitsenter	24	7	2	15	87:117	16
4.	Kohtla-Järve Central	24	3	2	19	66:138	8
