= TKK Tallinn =

Estonian ice hockey club

- City: Tallinn, Estonia
- League: Meistriliiga
- Founded: 2010
- Home arena: Jeti Ice Hall
- Colours
- Head coach: Aleksejs Bihanovs

TKK Tallinn is an Estonian ice hockey team playing in the Meistriliiga. The club is based in the Estonian capital, Tallinn and the home arena is Jeti Ice Hall. TKK Tallinn has played in Meistriliiga since it was established in 2010.

== Roster ==
- G (Estonia) Aleksei Arno 04.07.1994
- G (Estonia) Adam Kombe 04.08.1991
- G (Estonia) Georgi Oršitš 13.02.1994
- G (Latvia) Romāns Šumihins 09.06.1991
- D (Estonia) Vladislav Dotskin 19.04.1994
- D (Estonia) Kaupo Kaljuste 15.12.1981
- D (Estonia) Raiko Kiik 27.07.1991
- D (Estonia) Anton Levkovits 25.04.1983
- D (Estonia) Alexander Maier 06.07.1994
- D (Estonia) Ilja Ponomarjov 08.11.1991
- D (Estonia) Vjacheslav Sakovits 11.09.1991
- D (Estonia) Mark Samorukov 09.02.1989
- D (Estonia) Sergei Tsernikov 27.03.1993
- D (Estonia) Olavi Vürst 03.06.1991
- F (Estonia) Edgar Baranin 03.04.1990
- F (Estonia) Ivan Bazanov 25.03.1986
- F (Estonia) Maksin Borovikov 13.02.1992
- F (Estonia) Artur Bostrov 02.09.1991
- F (Estonia) Artur Fedoruk 04.01.1992
- F (Estonia) Martin Filippov ??.??.????
- F (Estonia) Anton Gurtovoi 03.03.1993
- F (Estonia) Martin Gut 17.10.1992
- F (Estonia) Rainer Komi 13.05.1992
- F (Finland) Tero Kotilainen 15.08.1982
- F (Finland) Ville Lapinkorpi 09.06.1981
- F (Estonia) Keven Leppimann 05.01.1992
- F (Estonia) Artjom Ossipenkov 29.09.1989
- F (Estonia) Kirill Postolaki 04.03.1990
- F (Estonia) Mark Punger 08.01.1993
- F (Estonia) Marko Sarapuu 13.08.1991
- F (Estonia) Mark Spirin 24.11.1993
- F (Estonia) Kristjan Valk 27.01.1981
