= Tartu Välk 494 =

Tartu Välk 494 may refer to:

- 2003–2007 name of FC Santos Tartu, football club from Tartu, Estonia
- Another name for Tartu Kalev-Välk, ice hockey team from Tartu, Estonia
