= 1995–96 Meistriliiga (ice hockey) season =

Sports season

The 1995–96 Meistriliiga season was the sixth season of the Meistriliiga, the top level of ice hockey in Estonia. Five teams participated in the league, and Kreenholm Narva won the championship.

== Standings ==
	Club	GP	W	T	L	GF–GA	Pts
1.	Kreenholm Narva	20	17	1	2	130:57	35
2.	THK-88 Tallinn	20	16	1	3	125:58	33
3.	LNSK Narva	20	9	1	10	101:99	19
4.	YSK Tallinn	20	5	1	14	78:112	11
5.	Keemik Kohtla-Järve	20	1	0	19	38:146	2
