= Aleksandr Vinogradov =

Aleksandr Vinogradov may refer to:

- Aleksandr Vinogradov (canoeist) (born 1951), Russian sprint canoeist
- Aleksandr Vinogradov (ice hockey) (born 1970), Russian ice hockey player
- Aleksandr Vinogradov (writer) (1930–2011), Soviet and Russian journalist and writer

== See also ==
- Alexander Vinogradov (disambiguation)
