= 2013–14 IIHF Continental Cup =

The Continental Cup 2013–14 was the 17th edition of the IIHF Continental Cup. The season has started on 27 September 2013, and finished on 12 January 2014.

The Super Final was played in Rouen, France on the 10–12 January 2014.

The points system used in this tournament was: the winner in regular time won 3 points, the loser 0 points; in case of a tie, an overtime and a penalty shootout is played, the winner in penalty shootouts or overtime won 2 points and the loser won 1 point.

== First Group Stage ==
=== Group A ===
(Belgrade, Serbia)

Team #1	Score	Team #2
CSKA Sofia (Bulgaria)	4:1	(Spain) CD Hielo Bipolo
HK Partizan (Serbia)	3:8	(Estonia) Tallinn Viiking-Sport
Tallinn Viiking-Sport (Estonia)	5:2	(Spain) CD Hielo Bipolo
HK Partizan (Serbia)	5:3	(Bulgaria) CSKA Sofia
Tallinn Viiking-Sport (Estonia)	5:3	(Bulgaria) CSKA Sofia
HK Partizan (Serbia)	1:10	(Spain) CD Hielo Bipolo

=== Group A standings ===
Rank	Team	Points
1	(Estonia) Tallinn Viiking-Sport	9
2	(Spain) CD Hielo Bipolo	3
3	(Bulgaria) CSKA Sofia	3
4	(Serbia) HK Partizan	3

== Second Group Stage ==
=== Group B ===
(Nottingham, Great Britain)

Team #1	Score	Team #2
HK Juniors (Latvia)	8:3	(Netherlands) HYS The Hague
Nottingham Panthers (United Kingdom)	5:3	(Spain) CD Hielo Bipolo
HK Juniors (Latvia)	7:2	(Spain) CD Hielo Bipolo
Nottingham Panthers (United Kingdom)	7:3	(Netherlands) HYS The Hague
HYS The Hague (Netherlands)	5:3	(Spain) CD Hielo Bipolo
Nottingham Panthers (United Kingdom)	3:1	(Latvia) HK Juniors

=== Group B standings ===
Rank	Team	Points
1	(United Kingdom) Nottingham Panthers	9
2	(Latvia) HK Juniors	6
3	(Netherlands) HYS The Hague	3
4	(Spain) CD Hielo Bipolo^{[a]}	0

- ^{a} Tallinn Viiking-Sport, the winners of Group A didn't fly to Nottingham due to visa problems and were replaced by Group A runners-up CD Hielo Bipolo.

=== Group C ===
(Dunaújváros, Hungary)

Team #1	Score	Team #2
KS Cracovia (Poland)	2:0	(Slovenia) HK Slavija Ljubljana
DAB-Docler (Hungary)	3:2 (SO)	(Romania) HSC Csíkszereda
KS Cracovia (Poland)	2:0	(Romania) HSC Csíkszereda
DAB-Docler (Hungary)	3:0	(Slovenia) HK Slavija Ljubljana
HSC Csíkszereda (Romania)	2:1	(Slovenia) HK Slavija Ljubljana
DAB-Docler (Hungary)	5:3	(Poland) KS Cracovia

=== Group C standings ===
Rank	Team	Points
1	(Hungary) DAB-Docler	8
2	(Poland) KS Cracovia	6
3	(Romania) HSC Csíkszereda	4
4	(Slovenia) HK Slavija Ljubljana	0

== Third Group Stage ==
=== Group D ===
(Asiago, Italy)

Team #1	Score	Team #2
Toros Neftekamsk (Russia)	4:3	(United Kingdom) Nottingham Panthers
HC Asiago (Italy)	3:1	(Kazakhstan) Yertis Pavlodar
Nottingham Panthers (United Kingdom)	2:1	(Kazakhstan) Yertis Pavlodar
HC Asiago (Italy)	6:2	(Russia) Toros Neftekamsk
Yertis Pavlodar (Kazakhstan)	4:2	(Russia) Toros Neftekamsk
HC Asiago (Italy)	3:2	(United Kingdom) Nottingham Panthers

=== Group D standings ===
Rank	Team	Points
1	(Italy) HC Asiago	9
2	(Kazakhstan) Yertis Pavlodar	3
3	(United Kingdom) Nottingham Panthers	3
4	(Russia) Toros Neftekamsk	3

=== Group E ===
(Vojens, Denmark)

Team #1	Score	Team #2
Stavanger Oilers (Norway)	4:3 (SO)	(Belarus) HK Neman Grodno
SønderjyskE Ishockey (Denmark)	1:2	(Hungary) DAB-Docler
Stavanger Oilers (Norway)	9:1	(Hungary) DAB-Docler
SønderjyskE Ishockey (Denmark)	0:1 (OT)	(Belarus) HK Neman Grodno
HK Neman Grodno (Belarus)	3:1	(Hungary) DAB-Docler
SønderjyskE Ishockey (Denmark)	1:3	(Norway) Stavanger Oilers

=== Group E standings ===
Rank	Team	Points
1	(Norway) Stavanger Oilers	8
2	(Belarus) HK Neman Grodno	6
3	(Hungary) DAB-Docler	3
4	(Denmark) SønderjyskE Ishockey	1

== Final stage ==
=== Final Group ===
(Rouen, France)

Team #1	Score	Team #2
HC Donbass (Ukraine)	3:2 (SO)	(Norway) Stavanger Oilers
Dragons de Rouen (France)	0:6	(Italy) HC Asiago
HC Donbass (Ukraine)	5:1	(Italy) HC Asiago
Dragons de Rouen (France)	2:6	(Norway) Stavanger Oilers
Stavanger Oilers (Norway)	7:2	(Italy) HC Asiago
Dragons de Rouen (France)	4:3 (SO)	(Ukraine) HC Donbass

=== Final Group standings ===
Rank	Team	Points
1	(Norway) Stavanger Oilers	7
2	(Ukraine) HC Donbass	6
3	(Italy) HC Asiago	3
4	(France) Dragons de Rouen	2
