= 1996–97 Meistriliiga (ice hockey) season =

Estonian national championships in ice hockey

The 1996–97 Meistriliiga season was the seventh season of the Meistriliiga, the top level of ice hockey in Estonia. Five teams participated in the league, and Tartu Valk 494 won the championship.

== Standings ==
	Club	GP	W	T	L	GF–GA	Pts
1.	Tartu Välk 494	20	18	0	2	154:57	36
2.	Kreenholm Narva	20	17	0	3	142:69	34
3.	YSK Tallinn	20	10	0	10	142:115	20
4.	Keemik Kohtla-Järve	20	4	0	16	62:137	8
5.	THK-88 Tallinn	20	1	0	19	48:170	2
