= 2009–10 Meistriliiga (ice hockey) season =

Estonian national championships in ice hockey

2009–10 Meistriliiga season
- League: Meistriliiga
- Sport: Ice hockey
- Duration: October 3, 2009 – March 28, 2010
- Teams: 3

Regular season
- Champion: Kohtla-Järve Viru Sputnik

Meistriliiga seasons
- ← 2008–09 2010–11 →

The 2009–10 Meistriliiga was a season of the Meistriliiga, the top professional ice hockey league in Estonia.

== Teams ==
2009–10 Meistriliiga teams

Three teams participated in the 2009–10 edition of the Meistriliiga:

Kohtla-Järve Viru Sputnik
Narva PSK
Tartu Välk 494

== Standings ==
	Team	GP	W	OTW	OTL	L	GF	GA	PTS
1	Kohtla-Järve Viru Sputnik	16	8	2	2	4	74	57	30
2	Narva PSK	16	5	4	2	5	69	61	25
3	Tartu Välk 494	16	5	0	2	9	66	91	17
