= 2002–03 Meistriliiga (ice hockey) season =

Estonian national championships in ice hockey

The 2002–03 Meistriliiga season was the 13th season of the Meistriliiga, the top level of ice hockey in Estonia. Eight teams participated in the league, and Tartu Valk 494 won the championship.

== Regular season ==
=== Group A ===
	Club	GP	W	T	L	GF–GA	Pts
1.	Tartu Välk 494	20	19	0	1	132:33	38
2.	HK Karud-Monstera Tallinn	20	7	2	11	94:96	16
3.	Kohtla-Järve ChC	20	6	3	11	66:87	15
4.	HK Vipers Tallinn	20	5	3	12	60:93	13

=== Group B ===
	Club	GP	W	T	L	GF–GA	Pts
1.	HK Narva 2000	20	13	4	3	99:48	30
2.	HK Stars Tallinn	20	10	3	7	94:81	23
3.	HC Panter Tallinn	20	11	1	8	93:75	23
4.	HC Visa-Tiigrid Tallinn	20	1	0	19	50:175	2

== Playoffs ==
=== Quarterfinals ===
- HK Stars Tallinn - Kohtla-Järve ChC 4:6
- HK Karud-Monstera Tallinn - HC Panter Tallinn 2:3

=== Semifinals ===
- Tartu Välk 494 - Kohtla-Järve ChC 4:0
- HK Narva 2000 - HC Panter Tallinn 4:3 n.V.

=== 3rd place ===
- Kohtla-Järve ChC - HC Panter Tallinn 1:3

=== Final ===
- Tartu Välk 494 - HK Narva 2000 4:1
