= 2001–02 Meistriliiga (ice hockey) season =

Estonian national championships in ice hockey

The 2001–02 Meistriliiga season was the 12th season of the Meistriliiga, the top level of ice hockey in Estonia. Nine teams participated in the league, and Tartu Valk 494 won the championship.

== First round ==
=== Tallinn Group ===
	Club	GP	W	T	L	GF–GA	Pts
1.	HK Vipers	10	9	0	1	66:42	18
2.	HK Karud	10	6	1	3	60:47	13
3.	HC Panter	10	6	1	3	55:44	13
4.	SK Monstera	10	5	0	5	53:52	10
5.	Visa-Tiigrid	10	2	0	8	39:66	4
6.	HC Tallinna Jeti	10	1	0	9	35:57	2

=== Viru Group ===
	Club	GP	W	T	L	GF–GA	Pts
1.	Tartu Välk 494	4	3	1	0	22:12	7
2.	HK Narva 2000	4	2	1	1	17:14	5
3.	HK Central Kohtla-Järve	4	0	0	4	12:25	0

== Final round ==
	Club	GP	W	T	L	GF–GA	Pts
1.	Tartu Välk 494	10	9	1	0	71:22	19
2.	HK Narva 2000	10	8	1	1	63:25	17
3.	HK Vipers	10	4	0	6	40:72	8
4.	HK Karud	10	2	2	6	33:61	6
5.	HK Central Kohtla-Järve	10	2	1	7	37:52	5
6.	HC Panter	10	2	1	7	44:56	5

== Playoffs ==
=== Semifinals ===
- HK Vipers - HK Narva 2000 1:6/3:7
- HK Karud - Tartu Välk 494 3:9/2:8

=== 3rd place ===
- HK Karud - HK Vipers 3:4

=== Final ===
- Tartu Välk 494 - HK Narva 2000 7:1/4:2
