= Alexander Vinogradov =

Alexander Vinogradov may refer to:

- Alexander Vinogradov (bass) (born 1976), Russian bass opera singer
- Alexander Pavlovich Vinogradov (1895–1975), Soviet geochemist
- Alexander Vinogradov (ice hockey) (1918–1988), Russian ice hockey player

== See also ==
- Aleksandr Vinogradov (disambiguation)
