= Kalev Tallinn =

Multi-sport club in Tallinn

Kalev Tallinn was a multi-sport organisation in Tallinn, Estonia. Current clubs are independent, some have been re-established.

== Association football ==
Kalev's football team was formed as Jalgpalliselts Meteor (Football Union Meteor) in 1909 and changed to its present name in 1911, when it joined the all-Estonian sports organisation Estonian Sports Association Kalev.

Kalev's football team was re-established in 2002 as JK Tallinna Kalev and now also has a women's team and several youth teams.

== Bandy ==
During its first years, Kalev Tallinn also was a successful club in the sport of bandy. The club became Estonian champions of this sport in 1916, 1917 and 1918.

== Basketball ==
- KK Kalev (1920–2005)
- BC Tallinna Kalev (1998–2024)

== Ice hockey ==
Kalev used to play in the ice hockey Meistriliiga, winning the title seven times in 1934, 1937, 1958, 1959, 1960, 1961 and 1962.

== Rugby ==
There is a non-associated rugby team under the name Tallinna Kalev RFC.
