= Estonian Cup (ice hockey) =

National ice hockey competition in Estonia

The Estonian Cup was the national ice hockey cup competition in Estonia. It was held in 1996, 1997, 1998, and 2007. Tartu Välk 494 won the most cups, with two.

== Champions ==
Season	Champion	Runner-up	Score(s)
1996	Narva Kreenholm	THK-88 Tallinn	4–2
1997	Tartu Kalev-Välk	Keemik Kohtla-Järve	1–3, 7–1
1998	Tartu Välk 494	Central Kohtla-Järve	5–5 (2–1 SO), 7–3, 8–4
2007	Tallinn Stars	Narva PSK	1–7, 4–2, 3–2
