= Sergejs Višegorodcevs =

Latvian ice hockey player

- Born: May 22, 1976 (age 48); Riga, Latvian SSR, Soviet Union
- Height: 6 ft 3 in (191 cm)
- Weight: 198 lb (90 kg; 14 st 2 lb)
- Position: Defence
- Shot: Left
- Played for: Pārdaugava Rīga; Juniors Riga; HK Vital Riga; HC CSKA Moscow; HK Riga 2000; HK Liepājas Metalurgs; Odense Bulldogs; ASK/Ogre; HK Concept Riga; HK Ozolnieki/Monarhs; Ours de Villard-de-Lans
- Playing career: 1993–2013

Sergejs Višegorodcevs (born May 22, 1976) is a Latvian former professional ice hockey defenceman.

== Career ==
Višegorodcevs played in the Russian Superleague for CSKA Moscow from 1996 to 1998 and again from 2001 to 2002. He also played the Metal Ligaen in Denmark for the Odense Bulldogs and the Ligue Magnus in France for Ours de Villard-de-Lans.

He also played for the Minnesota Blue Ox in Roller Hockey International during the 1999 RHI season.

== Career statistics ==
			Regular season					Playoffs
Season	Team	League	GP	G	A	Pts	PIM	GP	G	A	Pts	PIM
1993–94	Pardaugava Riga	Latvia	24	4	6	10	50	—	—	—	—	—
1994–95	Pardaugava Riga-2	Latvia	22	3	7	10	75	—	—	—	—	—
1995–96	Juniors Riga	EEHL	35	1	5	6	40	—	—	—	—	—
1995–96	Juniors Riga	Latvia	—	—	—	—	—	—	—	—	—	—
1996–97	HK Vital Riga	Latvia	3	0	1	1	38	—	—	—	—	—
1996–97	HC CSKA Moscow	Russia	24	0	2	2	4	—	—	—	—	—
1997–98	HC CSKA Moscow	Russia	23	0	2	2	20	—	—	—	—	—
1998–99	San Diego Gulls	WCHL	51	3	24	27	28	11	1	1	2	4
1999–00	San Diego Gulls	WCHL	42	5	5	10	62	—	—	—	—	—
2000–01	San Diego Gulls	WCHL	34	1	8	9	44	—	—	—	—	—
2000–01	Gislaveds SK	Allsvenskan	13	2	2	4	18	—	—	—	—	—
2001–02	HC CSKA Moscow	Russia	11	0	0	0	22	—	—	—	—	—
2001–02	HC CSKA Moscow-2	Russia3	3	0	0	0	4	—	—	—	—	—
2001–02	HK Riga 2000	EEHL	12	1	3	4	48	—	—	—	—	—
2002–03	Metalurgs Liepaja	EEHL	4	1	1	2	2	—	—	—	—	—
2002–03	Metalurgs Liepaja	Latvia	—	0	0	0	2	—	—	—	—	—
2002–03	Memphis RiverKings	CHL	48	7	7	14	28	—	—	—	—	—
2003–04	HK Riga 2000	EEHL	6	0	1	1	40	—	—	—	—	—
2003–04	HK Riga 2000	Latvia	6	2	3	5	8	—	—	—	—	—
2004–05	Jacksonville Barracudas	SPHL	15	3	4	7	7	—	—	—	—	—
2004–05	Asheville Aces	SPHL	17	1	1	2	9	—	—	—	—	—
2004–05	Rockford IceHogs	UHL	14	0	2	2	2	—	—	—	—	—
2005–06	Odense Bulldogs	Denmark	25	4	9	13	57	5	0	1	1	8
2006–07	Odense Bulldogs	Denmark	13	0	0	0	8	—	—	—	—	—
2007–08	ASK/Ogre	Latvia	15	1	4	5	30	6	1	1	2	10
2008–09	HK Concept Riga	Latvia	25	2	14	16	26	—	—	—	—	—
2010–11	HK Concept Riga	Latvia	33	5	16	21	107	—	—	—	—	—
2011–12	HK Ozolnieki/Monarhs	Latvia	10	0	4	4	6	—	—	—	—	—
2011–12	Ours de Villard-de-Lans	France	16	3	6	9	16	—	—	—	—	—
2012–13	Chevaliers du Lac d'Annecy	France2	25	2	4	6	69	—	—	—	—	—
Latvia totals			138	17	55	72	342	6	1	1	2	10
