= 1994–95 Meistriliiga (ice hockey) season =

Estonian national championships in ice hockey

The 1994–95 Meistriliiga season was the fifth season of the Meistriliiga, the top level of ice hockey in Estonia. Five teams participated in the league, and Kreenholm Narva won the championship.

== Regular season ==
	Club	GP	W	T	L	GF–GA	Pts
1.	Kreenholm Narva	8	8	0	0	60:17	16
2.	Monstera Tallinn	8	5	1	2	74:30	11
3.	THK-88 Tallinn	8	2	1	5	25:41	5
4.	LNSK Narva	8	2	0	6	28:63	4
5.	Keemik Kohtla-Järve	8	2	0	6	22:58	4

== Playoffs ==
=== Semifinals ===
- THK-88 Tallinn - Kreenholm Narva 0:3 (2:10, 1:2, 3:10)
- Monstera Tallinn - LNSK Narva 0:3 (5:7, 0:5, 0:5) (Forfeit)

=== 3rd place ===
- THK-88 Tallinn - Monstera Tallinn 3:0 (5:0, 5:0, 5:0 ) (Forfeit)

=== Final ===
- Kreenholm Narva - LNSK Narva 5:0 (3:2, 11:3, 14:0, 11:2, 4:3)
