= CD Hielo Bipolo =

ESCOR BAKH
- City: Vitoria-Gasteiz, Spain
- League: 2014–15 season Did not play
- Founded: 2012
- Home arena: BAKH Center
- Website: bipolo.es

Club Deportivo Hielo Bipolo, also known as Escor BAKH by sponsorship reasons, is an ice hockey team in Vitoria-Gasteiz, Spain. They play in the Liga Nacional de Hockey Hielo, the top level of ice hockey in Spain.

== History ==
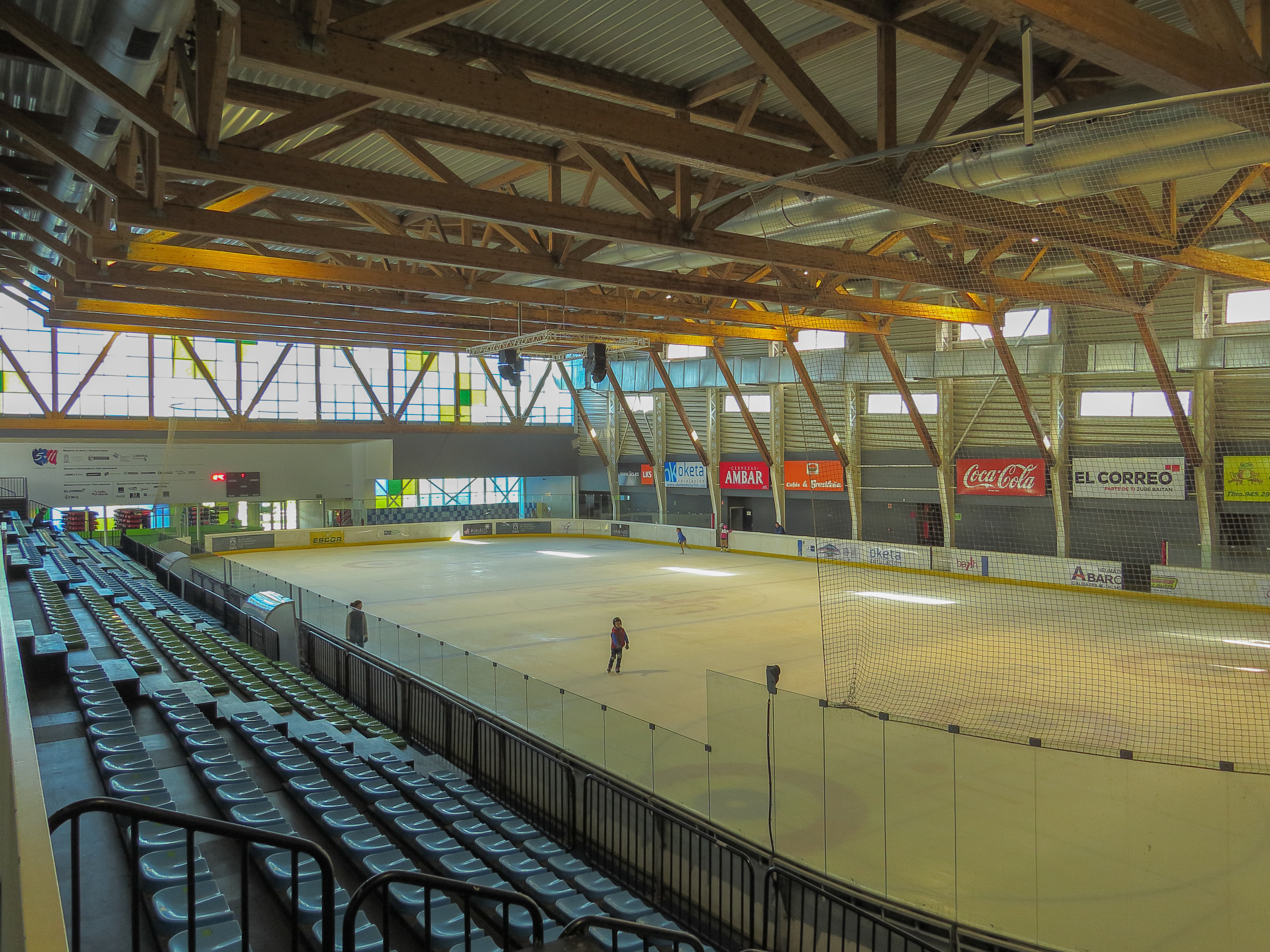
The ice rink at BAKH, where Hielo Bipolo used to play its games.

CD Hielo Bipolo was founded in 2012. In 2013, the team achieved its first national league and qualified to play the 2013–14 IIHF Continental Cup.

In September 2014, the senior ice hockey team of the club ceased in activity.

== Achievements ==
- Spanish League: (2)
  - 2012–13, 2013–14
- Spanish Cup: (1)
  - 2014
- Spanish Supercup: (1)
  - 2013
