= 1993–94 Meistriliiga (ice hockey) season =

Estonian national championships in ice hockey

The 1993–94 Meistriliiga season was the fourth season of the Meistriliiga, the top level of ice hockey in Estonia. Seven teams participated in the league, and Kreenholm Narva won the championship.

== First round ==
	Club	GP	W	T	L	GF–GA	Pts
1.	Kreenholm Narva	12	12	0	0	144:21	24
2.	JSK Monstera Tallinn	12	10	0	2	116:29	20
3.	Keemik Kohtla-Järve	12	8	0	4	84:58	16
4.	HK Tartu	12	5	0	7	62:88	10
5.	LNSK Narva	12	3	0	9	48:87	6
6.	THK-88 Tallinn	12	3	0	9	41:130	6
7.	HK Jõgeva	12	1	0	11	38:120	2

== Final round ==
	Club	GP	W	T	L	GF–GA	Pts
1.	Kreenholm Narva	12	12	0	0	112:12	24
2.	JSK Monstera Tallinn	12	6	1	5	78:37	13
3.	Keemik Kohtla-Järve	12	5	1	6	48:64	11
4.	Hokiklubi Tartu	12	0	0	12	16:141	0

== 5th–7th Place ==
	Club	GP	W	T	L	GF–GA	Pts
5.	HK Jõgeva	6	5	0	1	18:14	10
6.	Narva LNSK	6	3	0	3	39:23	6
7.	THK-88 Tallinn	6	1	0	5	19:39	2
