= List of Estonian bandy champions =

The list of Estonian bandy champions starts as early as in 1916, when Estonias was a province in the Russian Empire, where bandy already was a popular sport. Just some years later, following the Russian Revolution, Estonia became independent. The championship was held semi-regularly until 1953, from 1941 for the then Estonian SSR.

== Estonian bandy champions ==
Year	Champion
1916	Tallinna Kalev
1917	Tallinna Kalev
1918	Tallinna Kalev
1919	no championship
1920	Tallinna Sport
1921	Tallinna Sport
1922	Tallinna Sport
1923	Tallinna Sport
1924	Tallinna Sport
1925	no championship
1926	Tallinna Kalev
1927	Tallinna Hokiklubi
1928	Tallinna Sport
1929	Tallinna Sport
1930	Tallinna Sport
1931	Tallinna Sport
1932	Tallinna Sport
1933	Tallinna Kalev
1934	Tallinna Kalev
1935	Tallinna Sport
1936–40	no championships
1941	Tallinna Dünamo
1942–46	no championships
1947	Tallinna BLTSK
1948–49	no championships
1950	Tallinna BLTSK I
1951	Tallinna BLTSK
1952	Tallinna BLTSK
1953	Tallinna BLTSK

- BLTSK = Balti Laevastik Tallinn SK (Baltflot, Балтфлот).
- Tallinna ÜENÜ = Ülemaaline Eesti Noorsoo Ühendus (Tallinna osakond)

== Links ==
- sporditulemused
