= 2009–10 IIHF Continental Cup =

The Continental Cup 2009–10 was the 13th edition of the IIHF Continental Cup. The season started on September 25, 2009, and finished on January 15, 2010.

The tournament was won by Red Bull Salzburg, who led the final group.

The points system used in this tournament was: the winner in regular time won 3 points, the loser 0 points; in case of a tie, an overtime and a penalty shootout is played, the winner in penalty shootouts or overtime won 2 points and the loser won 1 point.

== First Group Stage ==
=== Group A ===
(Ankara, Turkey)

Team #1	Score	Team #2
Polis Akademisi (Turkey)	3:7	(Bulgaria) HC Slavia Sofia
FC Barcelona (Spain)	14:1	(Israel) Ice Time Herzliya
Polis Akademisi (Turkey)	8:3	(Israel) Ice Time Herzliya
FC Barcelona (Spain)	3:1	(Bulgaria) HC Slavia Sofia
HC Slavia Sofia (Bulgaria)	11:2	(Israel) Ice Time Herzliya
Polis Akademisi (Turkey)	1:13	(Spain) FC Barcelona

=== Group A standings ===
Rank	Team	Points
1	(Spain) FC Barcelona	9
2	(Bulgaria) HC Slavia Sofia	6
3	(Turkey) Polis Akademisi	3
4	(Israel) Ice Time Herzliya	0

== Second Group Stage ==
=== Group B ===
(Miercurea Ciuc, Romania)

Team #1	Score	Team #2
Újpesti TE (Hungary)	9:3	(Spain) FC Barcelona
SC Miercurea Ciuc (Romania)	3:4	(Netherlands) HYS The Hague
Újpesti TE (Hungary)	2:6	(Netherlands) HYS The Hague
SC Miercurea Ciuc (Romania)	11:2	(Spain) FC Barcelona
FC Barcelona (Spain)	1:9	(Netherlands) HYS The Hague
SC Miercurea Ciuc (Romania)	5:0	(Hungary) Újpesti TE

=== Group B standings ===
Rank	Team	Points
1	(Netherlands) HYS The Hague	9
2	(Romania) SC Miercurea Ciuc	6
3	(Hungary) Újpesti TE	3
4	(Spain) FC Barcelona	0

=== Group C ===
(Kraków, Poland)

Team #1	Score	Team #2
SC Energija (Lithuania)	2:3 (OT)	(Estonia) Tartu Välk 494
Cracovia (Poland)	3:2	(Kazakhstan) Saryarka Karaganda
Saryarka Karaganda (Kazakhstan)	4:1	(Lithuania) SC Energija
Cracovia (Poland)	9:3	(Estonia) Tartu Välk 494
Saryarka Karaganda (Kazakhstan)	8:0	(Estonia) Tartu Välk 494
Cracovia (Poland)	7:5	(Lithuania) SC Energija

=== Group C standings ===
Rank	Team	Points
1	(Poland) Cracovia	9
2	(Kazakhstan) Saryarka Karaganda	6
3	(Estonia) Tartu Välk 494	2
4	(Lithuania) SC Energija	1

(United Kingdom) Sheffield Steelers, (Slovenia) HDK Maribor, (Italy) HC Bolzano, (Austria) Red Bull Salzburg, (Ukraine) Sokil Kiev, (Latvia) Liepājas Metalurgs : bye

== Third Group Stage ==
=== Group D ===
(Bolzano, Italy)

Team #1	Score	Team #2
Sheffield Steelers (United Kingdom)	4:3	(Netherlands) HYS The Hague
HC Bolzano (Italy)	6:2	(Slovenia) HDK Maribor
HDK Maribor (Slovenia)	4:5	(United Kingdom) Sheffield Steelers
HC Bolzano (Italy)	3:0	(Netherlands) HYS The Hague
HYS The Hague (Netherlands)	4:1	(Slovenia) HDK Maribor
HC Bolzano (Italy)	3:4 (SO)	(United Kingdom) Sheffield Steelers

=== Group D standings ===
Rank	Team	Points
1	(United Kingdom) Sheffield Steelers	8
2	(Italy) HC Bolzano	7
3	(Netherlands) HYS The Hague	3
4	(Slovenia) HDK Maribor	0

=== Group E ===
(Liepāja, Latvia)

Team #1	Score	Team #2
Red Bull Salzburg (Austria)	6:5	(Ukraine) Sokil Kiev
Liepājas Metalurgs (Latvia)	6:5	(Poland) Cracovia
Cracovia (Poland)	2:1 (OT)	(Ukraine) Sokil Kiev
Liepājas Metalurgs (Latvia)	3:4	(Austria) Red Bull Salzburg
Red Bull Salzburg (Austria)	5:2	(Poland) Cracovia
Liepājas Metalurgs (Latvia)	3:5	(Ukraine) Sokil Kiev

=== Group E standings ===
Rank	Team	Points
1	(Austria) Red Bull Salzburg	9
2	(Ukraine) Sokil Kiev	4
3	(Latvia) Liepājas Metalurgs	3
4	(Poland) Cracovia	2

(France) Grenoble Brûleurs de Loups, (Belarus) Yunost Minsk : bye

== Final stage ==
=== Final Group ===
(Grenoble, France)

Team #1	Score	Team #2
Red Bull Salzburg (Austria)	5:3	(Belarus) Yunost Minsk
Grenoble Brûleurs de Loups (France)	2:5	(United Kingdom) Sheffield Steelers
Red Bull Salzburg (Austria)	6:1	(United Kingdom) Sheffield Steelers
Grenoble Brûleurs de Loups (France)	3:2 (SO)	(Belarus) Yunost Minsk
Yunost Minsk (Belarus)	4:1	(United Kingdom) Sheffield Steelers
Grenoble Brûleurs de Loups (France)	4:9	(Austria) Red Bull Salzburg

=== Final Group standings ===
Rank	Team	Points
1	(Austria) Red Bull Salzburg	9
2	(Belarus) Yunost Minsk	4
3	(United Kingdom) Sheffield Steelers	3
4	(France) Grenoble Brûleurs de Loups	2
