= Jeti Ice Hall =

Indoor arena in Tallinn

- Jeti jäähall
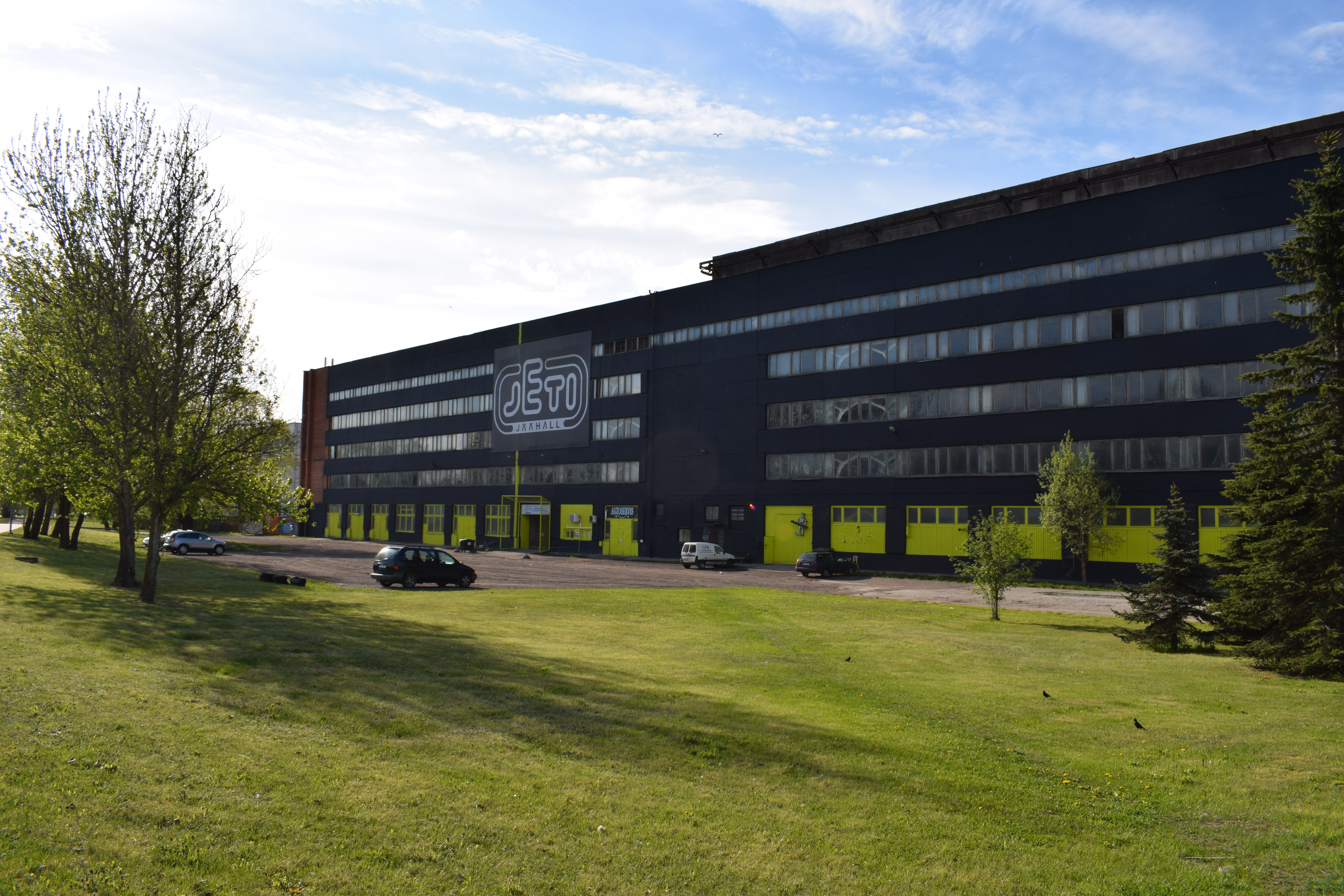
- Jeti jäähall
- Interactive map of Jeti Ice Hall
- Address: Suur-Sõjamäe 14b, 11415 Tallinn, Estonia
- Location: Tallinn, Estonia
- Coordinates: 59°25′20″N 24°48′57″E

Construction
- Opened: 2000

Website
- www.jeti.ee

Jeti Ice Hall (Estonian: Jeti jäähall) is an ice arena in Tallinn, Estonia.

The hall was opened in 2000.

The hall's capacity is 100.

The hall has an ice arena with dimensions of 30 x 60 m.

The hall is used by the following ice hockey clubs: HC Magic Wings Tallinn, HC Viking Tallinn, HK Mark Winner Tallinn, HK Crazy Bears.

From 2005, the hall is a place for Tallinn Cup curling tournament.
