= 2011–12 FFHG Division 1 season =

The 2011–12 FFHG Division 1 season was contested by 14 teams, and saw the Scorpions de Mulhouse win the championship. They were promoted to the Ligue Magnus as result. The Jokers de Cergy-Pontoise and the Lynx de Valence were relegated to FFHG Division 2.

== Regular season ==
	Team	GP	W	OTW	OTL	L	Pts	GF	GA	Diff
1.	Aigles de Nice	26	18	3	2	3	44	136	74	+62
2.	Scorpions de Mulhouse	26	16	3	3	4	41	121	62	+59
3.	Albatros de Brest	26	15	5	1	5	41	135	74	+51
4.	Phénix de Reims	26	14	1	4	7	34	136	95	+41
5.	Orques d'Anglet	26	14	2	1	9	33	94	80	+14
6.	Lions de Lyon	26	12	3	3	8	33	114	95	+19
7.	Vipers de Montpellier	26	11	2	3	10	29	101	96	+5
8.	Coqs de Courbevoie	26	8	2	5	11	25	106	145	-39
9.	Boxers de Bordeaux	26	7	4	1	14	23	106	122	-16
10.	Bélougas de Toulouse-Blagnac	26	9	1	2	14	22	73	114	-41
11.	Corsaires de Dunkerque	26	7	2	3	14	21	89	117	-28
12.	Avalanche Mont-Blanc	26	9	1	1	15	21	96	108	-12
13.	Jokers de Cergy	26	7	3	0	16	20	78	136	-58
14.	Lynx de Valence	26	3	0	3	20	9	79	146	-67

== Playoffs ==
Quarter-finals
Aigles de Nice	2
Coqs de Courbevoie	0
Phénix de Reims	2
Orques d'Anglet	0
Albatros de Brest	2
Lions de Lyon	0
Scorpions de Mulhouse	2
Vipers de Montpellier	0

Semi-finals
Aigles de Nice	2
Phénix de Reims	1
Albatros de Brest	0
Scorpions de Mulhouse	2

Final
Aigles de Nice	0
Scorpions de Mulhouse	2
