= Juniors Riga =

Latvian ice hockey club

- City: Riga, Latvia
- League: Latvian Hockey Higher League
- Founded: 1993
- Home arena: Rīgas Sporta pils

Franchise history
- 1993-1997: Juniors Rīga
- 1997-2000: Juniors Essamika Rīga

The Juniors Riga were an ice hockey team in Riga, Latvia. They played in the Latvian Hockey Higher League and the Eastern European Hockey League.

== History ==
The Juniors Riga were founded in 1993 and first took part in the Latvian Hockey Higher League. With the establishment of the East European Hockey League in 1996, the Juniors were included in this multinational league, and finished runner-up in their first season. They joined the LHL for the semifinals this year. A year later, Juniors Riga were EEHL champions by defeating Sokil Kiev in five games.

They participated in the 1997–98 IIHF Continental Cup.

Before the 1997-98 season, the team found a new sponsor, so they were renamed Essamika Juniors Riga. They finished fourth in the EEHL.

Due to financial problems, an affiliation with LB Prizma Riga was set up for 1998. The affiliate played in the LHL as LB/Essamika/Juniors-82 Riga.

The club folded after the 1999-00 season, in which they participated in the Latvian Hockey League and the EEHL Division B.

== Notable players ==
- Ģirts Ankipāns
- Armands Bērziņš
- Edijs Brahmanis
- Raitis Ivanāns
- Vladimirs Mamonovs
- Sergejs Višegorodcevs
- Jānis Sprukts
- Jēkabs Rēdlihs
