= 1990–91 Meistriliiga (ice hockey) season =

Estonian national championships in ice hockey

The 1990–91 Meistriliiga season was the first season of the Meistriliiga, the top level of ice hockey in Estonia. Five teams participated in the league, and Kreenholm Narva B won the championship.

== Standings ==
	Club	GP	W	T	L	Goals	Pts
1.	Kreenholm Narva B	15	13	1	1	142:80	27
2.	TVMK Tallinn	15	8	1	6	122:110	17
3.	LNSK Narva	15	4	1	10	83:108	9
4.	Keemik Kohtla-Järve	15	3	1	11	75:104	7
5.	Talleks Tallinn	8	1	2	5	28:48	4
