= 1992–93 Meistriliiga (ice hockey) season =

Estonian national championships in ice hockey

The 1992–93 Meistriliiga season was the third season of the Meistriliiga, the top level of ice hockey in Estonia. Eight teams participated in the league, and Kreenholm Narva won the championship.

== Final round ==
	Club	GP	W	T	L	GF–GA	Pts
1.	Kreenholm Narva	24	19	0	5	172:89	38
2.	Tallinna JSK	24	11	1	12	112:115	23
3.	Keemik Kohtla-Järve	24	8	3	13	97:127	19
4.	LNSK Narva	24	6	4	14	96:146	16

== 5th place ==
	Club	GP	W	T	L	GF–GA	Pts
5.	HK Tartu	12	10	1	1	52:20	21
6.	HK Jõgeva	12	5	1	6	39:40	11
7.	Tiigrid Tallinn	12	4	3	5	38:31	11
8.	ATP Kohtla-Järve	12	1	3	8	28:66	5

=== 6th place game ===
- HK Jõgeva – Tiigrid Tallinn 3:1
