= 1991–92 Meistriliiga (ice hockey) season =

Estonian national championships in ice hockey

The 1991–92 Meistriliiga season was the second season of the Meistriliiga, the top level of ice hockey in Estonia. Nine teams participated in the league, and Kreenholm Narva won the championship.

== First round ==
	Club	GP	W	T	L	GF–GA	Pts
1.	Keemik Kohtla-Järve	8	8	0	0	93:13	16
2.	Kreenholm Narva	8	7	0	1	67:29	14
3.	Tallinna JSK	8	6	0	2	69:38	12
4.	TVMK Tallinn	8	5	0	3	64:34	10
5.	Linnameeskond Tartu	8	4	0	4	39:45	8
6.	Talleks Tallinn	8	3	0	5	71:56	6
7.	ATP Kohtla-Järve	8	1	0	7	29:99	2
8.	HK Jõgeva	8	1	0	7	20:78	2
9.	Kalev Sillamäe	8	1	0	7	9:69	2

== Final round ==
	Club	GP	W	T	L	GF–GA	Pts
1.	Kreenholm Narva	28	23	1	4	231:92	47
2.	Tallinna JSK	28	19	0	9	200:143	38
3.	TVMK Tallinn	28	16	2	10	194:159	34
4.	Keemik Kohtla-Järve	28	15	3	10	213:121	33
5.	Talleks Tallinn	28	12	0	16	178:184	24
6.	Linnameeskond Tartu	28	5	0	23	72:194	10
