= Lõunakeskus Ice Hall =

Ice arena in Tartu, Estonia

- Lounakeskus jäähall
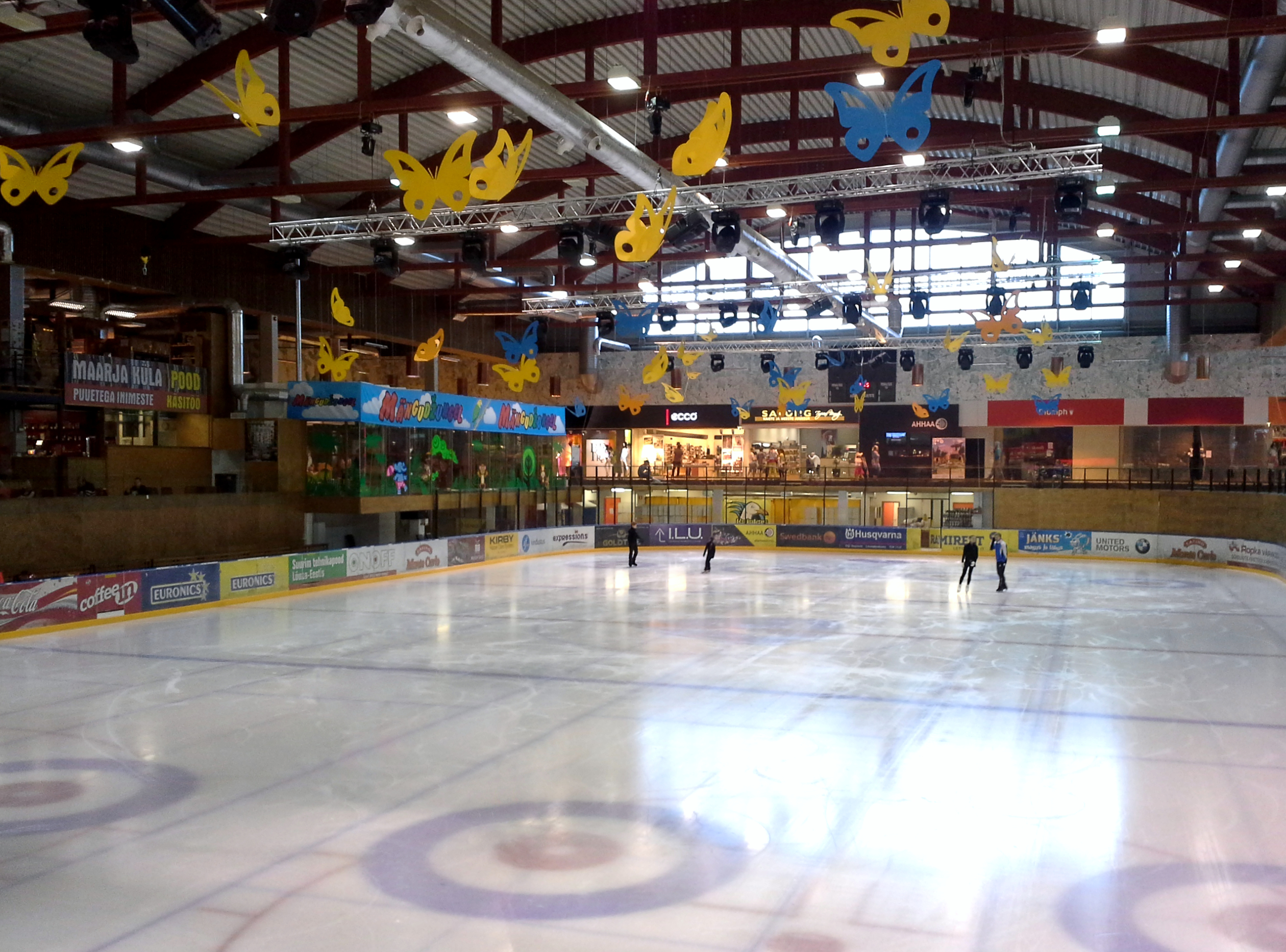
- Lõunakeskus Ice Hall in 2013
- Interactive map of Lõunakeskus Ice Hall
- Address: Riia 185c, 51014 Tartu, Estonia
- Location: Tartu, Estonia
- Coordinates: 58°21′24″N 26°40′33″E

Website
- astri.ee/lounakeskus/jaahall/

Lõunakeskus Ice Hall (Estonian: Lõunakeskuse jäähall) is an ice arena in Lõunakeskus, Tartu, Estonia.

The hall was opened in 2005.

The hall's capacity is 600.

The hall has an ice arena with dimensions of 30 x 60 m.

The hall is used by two ice hockey clubs: Tartu Välk 494 and HK Kajakas Tartu.

In 2008, the hall was a place for 2008 Estonian Figure Skating Championships.
