= HC Viking Tallinn =

Ice hockey team in Tallinn, Estonia

HC Viking
- City: Tallinn, Estonia
- League: Meistriliiga (EML)
- Founded: 2014
- Home arena: Tondiraba Ice Hall (capacity: 7,700)
- Colours
- Head coach: Igor Andryuschenko
- Captain: Maksim Ivanov
- Website: hcviking.ee

HC Viking are an ice hockey team based in Tallinn, Estonia. They are members of the Meistriliiga (EML). They have won one Estonian Championship since their founding in 2014. HC Viking play their home games at Tondiraba Ice Hall.

== History ==
HC Viking was founded in 2014 by Anatoli Sizov and Igor Saveljev as a successor of the two-time Estonian champions HK Viiking Sport. The club won their first Estonian Championship trophy in the 2017–18 EML season.

== Season-by-season record ==
This is a list of seasons completed by HC Viking.

Note: GP = Games played, W = Wins, OTW = Overtime wins, OTL = Overtime losses, L = Losses, Pts = Points, GF = Goals for, GA = Goals against

Season	GP	W	OTW	OTL	L	Pts	GF	GA	Finish	Playoffs
2014–15	16	14	0	1	1	43	87	37	1st	Did not qualify
2016–17	12	9	0	0	3	27	95	42	1st	Lost in finals, 1–3 (Narva PSK)
2017–18	18	11	0	1	6	34	86	75	1st	Champions, 3–1 (Tartu Kalev-Välk)
2018–19	18	10	0	2	6	32	94	76	2nd	Lost in semi-finals, 1–3 (Narva PSK)

== Awards and trophies ==
Estonian Championship

- 2017–18
