= Meistriliiga (ice hockey) =

Estonian ice hockey league

Unibet Hokiliiga
- Current season, competition or edition: 2026/27 UHL Season
- Association: Estonian Ice Hockey Association
- Sport: Ice hockey
- Founded: 1934
- No. of teams: 5
- Country: Estonia
- Headquarters: Tallinn, Estonia
- Most recent champion: Viru Sputnik (Viru Sputnik won in 2025/26 season)
- Most titles: Narva PSK (19 titles)
- Broadcaster: Eesti Hoki TV - https://www.eestihoki.tv/et/home
- Website: www.eestihoki.ee/liigad/unibet-hokiliiga

The Meistriliiga (EML), also known as the Unibet Hokiliiga for sponsorship reasons, is the top-tier ice hockey league in Estonia. The league consists of five teams.

There are 28 referees in the country who officiate at Estonian championship games in all age classes. The work of hockey referees is organized by the ref in chief of Estonian hockey referees Maksim Toode.

The Estonian champion has the right to represent the country at the Continental Cup of Hockey.

== History ==
The league was formed in the 1990-91 season. Since 1945–46, Estonian teams had participated in the Estonian SSR Championship. Prior to the country's annexation and incorporation into the Soviet Union, the Estonian Championship had been contested in interwar Estonia from 1934 to 1940. In the 2017–18 season, the league was known as the Nordic Power Hokiliiga. In the 2018-23 the name of the league was Coolbet Hokiliiga.

Narva PSK has dominated the league at the outset, winning the first six championships and eight of the first 11 seasons. Since winning their first title in 1997, Tartu Välk 494 has been the most consistently successful team in the Meistriliiga since the league started, having won a total of nine championships. HK Stars claimed four titles in five years from 2005 to 2009.

In the 2022-23 season, the tournament acquired international status, with 7 teams participating in the championship: 5 from Estonia (HC Panter, Välk 494, Narva PSK, HC Everest, Viru Sputnik) and 2 from Latvia (HK Kurbads, HS Riga). The team that won the championship that year was HK Kurbads.

In the 2023-24 season the name of the league was Unibet Hokiliiga, seven years later the Narva hockey players were able to win the Estonian championship and will represent the country in the 2024-25 IIHF Continental Cup in Group B, the games of which will be held in Narva.

The league retained its name for the 2024–25 season, with the capital's Vipers joining the five teams that played in the previous season.

== Teams ==
Team	City	Arena	Capacity	Founded
HC Everest Kohtla-Järve	Kohtla-Järve	Kohtla-Järve Ice Hall	1,000	2012
HC Vipers	Tallinn	Tondiraba Ice Hall	5,840	2014
Kohtla-Järve Viru Sputnik	Kohtla-Järve	Kohtla-Järve Ice Hall	1,000	2003
Narva PSK	Narva	Narva Ice Hall	1,500	1956
Tartu Välk 494	Tartu	Astri Arena	600	1994

== Title holders ==
=== Estonian Championship ===
- 1934: Tallinn Kalev
- 1935: not played
- 1936: Tartu ASK
- 1937: Tallinn Kalev
- 1938: not played
- 1939: Tartu ASK
- 1940: Tallinn Sport
- 1941–1945: not played

=== Estonian SSR Championship ===
- 1946: Dünamo Tallinn
- 1947: Dünamo Tartu
- 1948: Dünamo Tallinn
- 1949: Dünamo Tallinn
- 1950: Tallinn LTM
- 1951: Tallinn LTM
- 1952: Dünamo Tallinn
- 1953: Dünamo Tallinn
- 1954: Dünamo Tallinn
- 1955: Dünamo Tartu
- 1956: Kohtla-Järve Kalev
- 1957: Dünamo Tartu
- 1958: Tallinn Kalev
- 1959: Tallinn Kalev
- 1960: Tallinn Kalev
- 1961: Tallinn Kalev
- 1962: Tallinn Kalev
- 1963: Tallinn Ekskavaator
- 1964: Tallinn Taksopark
- 1965: Tallinn Tempo
- 1966: Tallinn Ekskavaator
- 1967: Narva Kreenholm
- 1968: Tallinn Tempo
- 1969: Narva Kreenholm
- 1970: Kohtla-Järve HK Keemik
- 1971: Narva Kreenholm
- 1972: Kohtla-Järve HK Keemik
- 1973: Narva Kreenholm
- 1974: Kohtla-Järve HK Keemik
- 1975: Narva Kreenholm
- 1976: Kohtla-Järve HK Keemik
- 1977: Kohtla-Järve HK Keemik
- 1978: Tallinn Talleks
- 1979: Kohtla-Järve HK Keemik
- 1980: Kohtla-Järve HK Keemik
- 1981: Tallinn Talleks
- 1982: Sillamäe Kalev
- 1983: Kohtla-Järve HK Keemik
- 1984: Kohtla-Järve HK Keemik
- 1985: Kohtla-Järve HK Keemik
- 1986: Narva Kreenholm
- 1987: Kohtla-Järve HK Keemik
- 1988: Narva Kreenholm
- 1989: Kohtla-Järve HK Keemik
- 1990: Narva Kreenholm II

=== Meistriliiga ===
- 1991: Narva Kreenholm II
- 1992: Narva Kreenholm
- 1993: Narva Kreenholm
- 1994: Narva Kreenholm
- 1995: Narva Kreenholm
- 1996: Narva Kreenholm
- 1997: Tartu Välk 494
- 1998: Narva Kreenholm
- 1999: Tartu Välk 494
- 2000: Tartu Välk 494
- 2001: Narva 2000
- 2002: Tartu Välk 494
- 2003: Tartu Välk 494
- 2004: HC Panter
- 2005: HK Stars
- 2006: HK Stars
- 2007: HK Stars
- 2008: Tartu Kalev-Välk
- 2009: HK Stars
- 2010: Kohtla-Järve Viru Sputnik
- 2011: Tartu Kalev-Välk
- 2012: Tartu Kalev-Välk
- 2013: Viiking Sport
- 2014: Viiking Sport
- 2015: Tartu Kalev-Välk
- 2016: Narva PSK
- 2017: Narva PSK
- 2018: HC Viking
- 2019: Tartu Välk 494
- 2020: Tartu Välk 494
- 2021: Tartu Välk 494
- 2022: Tartu Välk 494
- 2023: HK Kurbads
- 2024: Narva PSK
- 2025: Tartu Välk 494
- 2026: Viru Sputnik

== Titles by team ==
Titles	Team	Season
19	Narva PSK	1967, 1969, 1971, 1973, 1975, 1986, 1988, 1990, 1991, 1992, 1993, 1994, 1995, 1996, 1998, 2001, 2016, 2017, 2024
14	Tartu Kalev-Välk	1997, 1999, 2000, 2002, 2003, 2008, 2011, 2012, 2015, 2019, 2020, 2021, 2022, 2025
13	Kohtla-Järve HK Keemik	1956, 1970, 1972, 1974, 1976, 1977, 1979, 1980, 1983, 1984, 1985, 1987, 1989
7	Tallinn Kalev	1934, 1937, 1958, 1959, 1960, 1961, 1962
6	Dünamo Tallinn	1946, 1948, 1949, 1952, 1953, 1954
4	HK Stars	2005, 2006, 2007, 2009
3	Dünamo Tartu	1947, 1955, 1957
3	HC Viking	2013, 2014, 2018
2	Tartu ASK	1936, 1939
2	Tallinn LTM	1950, 1951
2	Tallinn Ekskavaator	1963, 1966
2	Tallinn Tempo	1965, 1968
2	Tallinn Talleks	1978, 1981
2	Kohtla-Järve Viru Sputnik	2010, 2026
1	Tallinn Sport	1940
1	Tallinn Taksopark	1964
1	Sillamäe Kalev	1982
1	HC Panter	2004
1	HK Kurbads	2023

== Estonian Youth Championships ==
The remaining leagues of the Estonian ice hockey championship are divided by age. In U8-U19 classes children can play according to the birth years of their age groups. In addition, a team can have up to 3 players who are one year older in their age group if they were born in the last three months of the previous year. As an exception, there is a special permit for girls who may be older than this age group by up to 2 years.

Purpose of the competition:

1. Identify Estonian youth ice hockey champions in the age groups U19, U16, U14.
2. To promote children's hockey in the age groups U12, U10 and U8 throughout Estonia.
3. Find out the candidates for the U-20 and U-18 teams.
4. To popularize ice hockey in the Republic of Estonia.

=== Season 2023-2024 ===
For the 2023-24 season, the following age groups were formed: U20, U17, U14, U12-1 (full rink championship matches); U12-2 (half rink championship matches); U10-1, U10-2, U8 (championship matches on a third of the rink).

==== U20 ====
There were 2 teams represented in the U20 class:

1. HC Panter/HK Tornaado (Tallinn)
2. Narva PSK (Narva)

The teams had 4 meetings with each other (2 at home and 2 away), each meeting lasted 3 periods of 20 minutes. Final standings of the winners:

U20
Place	Team	Points
1	HC Panter/HK Tornaado	7
2	Narva PSK	1

==== U17 ====
There were 6 teams represented in the U17 class:

1. SK Kajakas/HC Everest (Tartu, Kohtla-Järve)
2. Narva PSK (Narva)
3. HC Vipers (Tallinn)
4. HK Tornaado (Tallinn)
5. SK Viru Sputnik (Kohtla-Järve)
6. HC Panter (Tallinn)

Each team played 4 meetings (2 at home and 2 away), each game lasted 3 periods of 20 minutes. Final standings of the winners:

U17
Place	Team	Points
1	SK Kajakas/HC Everest	33
2	Narva PSK	27
3	HC Vipers	24

==== U14 ====
There were 11 teams represented in the U14 class:

1. HK Tornaado Sinine (Tallinn)
2. SK Kajakas (Tartu)
3. HC Vipers 11 (Tallinn)
4. Narva PSK (Narva)
5. HC Vipers 10 (Tallinn)
6. HC Panter Must (Tallinn)
7. HK Tornaado Kollane (Tallinn)
8. Narva PSK 2 (Narva)
9. SK Viru Sputnik (Kohtla-Järve)
10. HC Panter Punane (Tallinn)
11. HC Everest (Kohtla-Järve)

At the first stage, each team played one game with each, then, based on the results of the first round, the teams were divided into two groups U14-1 (the first 6 teams) and U14-2 (the last 5 teams) and in these groups they played 2 games each with each one. The first round the teams played 3 periods of 15 minutes. Second round: U14-1 - 3 periods of 15 minutes; U14-2 - 2 periods of 20 minutes. Final standings of the winners:

U14-1
Place	Team	Points
1	HK Tornaado Sinine	19
2	Narva PSK	14
3	HC Vipers 11	10

U14-2
Place	Team	Points
1	HK Tornaado Kollane	16
2	SK Viru Sputnik	12
3	Narva PSK 2	8

==== U12-1 ====
There were 7 teams represented in the U12-1 class:

1. HK Tornaado (Tallinn)
2. SK Kajakas (Tartu)
3. HC Vipers 2012 (Tallinn)
4. Narva PSK (Narva)
5. HC Vipers 2013 (Tallinn)
6. HC Panter (Tallinn)
7. SK Viru Sputnik (Kohtla-Järve)

Starting from the U12-1 class and up to U8, teams do not keep score during the game and the final score in all matches was 0:0.

In the U12-1 group, each team played 3 games with each other (1 away and 2 at home or 1 at home and 2 away), each game lasted 2 periods of 20 minutes.

==== U12-2 ====
There were 6 teams represented in the U12-2 class:

1. JHK/SOFTCOM (Jõgeva)
2. SK Kajakas (Tartu)
3. HC Vipers (Tallinn)
4. Narva PSK (Narva)
5. Viljandi Hokiklubi (Viljandi)
6. HC Panter (Tallinn)
7. HC Everest (Kohtla-Järve)

From U12-2 to U8, each game lasts 24 minutes.

In the U12-2 class each team had 3 meetings (1 away and 2 at home or 1 at home and 2 away). The teams played in a 4v4 format.

==== U10-1 ====
There were 8 teams represented in the U10-1 class:

1. HK Tornaado (Tallinn)
2. SK Kajakas (Tartu)
3. HC Vipers 2014 (Tallinn)
4. Narva PSK 1 (Narva)
5. HC Vipers 2015 (Tallinn)
6. HC Panter (Tallinn)
7. Narva PSK 2 (Narva)
8. SK Viru Sputnik (Kohtla-Järve)

From class U10-1 to U8, teams play in a 3v3 format.

Each team in the U10-1 class played 2 games (1 home and 1 away).

==== U10-2 ====
There were 4 teams represented in the U10-1 class:

1. HC Vipers 2014/2015 (Tallinn)
2. HC Panter (Tallinn)
3. HC Everest (Kohtla-Järve)
4. HK Tornaado (Tallinn)

Each team had 4 meetings (2 at home and 2 away).

==== U8 ====
There were 11 teams represented in the U8 class:

1. HK Tornaado Sinine (Tallinn)
2. SK Kajakas (Tartu)
3. HC Vipers (Tallinn)
4. Narva PSK Must (Narva)
5. JHK/SOFTCOM (Jõgeva)
6. HC Panter Must (Tallinn)
7. HK Tornaado Kollane (Tallinn)
8. Narva PSK Valge (Narva)
9. SK Viru Sputnik (Kohtla-Järve)
10. HC Panter Punane (Tallinn)
11. HC Everest (Kohtla-Järve)

Children of the youngest class of the Estonian hockey championship played with a blue puck.

Notes

1. Before 1999 as Narva Kreenholm, and 1999–2003 as Narva 2000.
2. 1952–1961 as Kohtla-Järve Kalev, 1961–1969 as Kohtla-Järve PK, 1969–1997 as Kohtla-Järve HK Keemik, 1997–2001 as Kohtla-Järve Central, and since 2004 as Kohtla-Järve HK Keemik.
3. 1994–2007 as Tartu Välk 494.
4. 2010–2014 as Viiking Sport.
