= Tallinna HK Stars =

Estonian ice hockey club

- Association: Eesti Jäähoki Liit
- League: Meistriliiga
- Based in: Tallinn
- Arena: Linnahall
- Head coach: Juri Tsepilov
- Manager: Igor Skuratovski
- Championships: 2006–07

Tallinna HK Stars were a professional Estonian ice hockey team. They won the 2006–07 Estonian Championship.

== Roster ==
Goaltenders:

- (Estonia) Viktor Seliverstov 26.08.1990

Defencemen:

- 75 (Estonia) Roman Potsinok 10.02.1975 180/90
- 59 (Estonia) Dmitri Kalenda 10.03.1991 182/71
- 19 (Estonia) Kaupo Kaljuste 15.12.1981 189/86
- 07 (Estonia) Dmitri Suur 25.02.1975 180/96
- 55 (Estonia) Ilja Tsegotov 07.10.1986 185/90
- 02 (Russia) Daniil Osipov 20.12.81 180/80

Forwards:

- 44 (Estonia) Edgar Baranin 03.04.1990 182/74
- 79 (Estonia) Maksim Ivanov 05.06.1979 175/72
- 31 (Finland) Jussi Nieminen 20.03.1982 185/91
- 71 (Estonia) Aleksandr Kuznetsov 29.01.1985 176/95
- 24 (Estonia) Mihhail Kozlov 24.04.1975 180/81
- 77 (Estonia) Andrei Zorin 07.02.1974 175/83
- 17 (Estonia) Paul Sillandi 10.06.1983 185/80
- 83 (Estonia) Roman Razumovski 07.01.1983 180/70
- 41 (Russia) Mikhail Merkulov 25.06.1975 170/67
- 21 (Russia) Aleksandr Vinogradov 20.06.1970 175/85
- 69 (Estonia) Arkadi Zaitsev 01.03.1990 190/70
- 22 (Estonia) Kirill Postolaki 04.03.1990 185/85
- 29 (Estonia) Evgeny Nokhrin 31.10.76 180/77
- 28 (Estonia) Eduard Valiullin 28.11.1966 177/87
- 25 (Russia) Igor Starkovsky 18.05.1965 180/86
- 96 (Estonia) Andrei Lukin 26.02.89 188/75
