= Tartu Kalev-Välk =

Ice hockey team in Tartu, Estonia

Tartu Välk 494
- City: Tartu, Estonia
- League: Coolbet Hokiliiga; 1994–present
- Founded: 1994
- Home arena: Lõunakeskus Ice Hall (capacity: 600)
- Colours
- Head coach: Alexei Bogdanov
- Website: Tartu Välk 494

Franchise history
- 1994–2007: Tartu Välk 494
- 2007–2018: Tartu Kalev-Välk
- 2018–: Tartu Välk 494

Tartu Välk 494 is a professional ice hockey team based in Tartu, Estonia. The team competes in the Meistriliiga, the highest league in Estonia. The team plays its home games at the Lõunakeskus Ice Hall.

== History ==
Tartu Välk 494 was founded in April 1994, and the team won their first Meistriliiga Championship in 1997. Since then, team have gone on to win the league a further 14 times, with the most recent victory coming in 2025. In addition, they have twice won the now-defunct Estonian Cup, in 1997 and 1998.

By performing well in the Meistriliiga, Välk 494 have subsequently represented Estonia in continental competition on several occasions, initially during the 1997–98 IIHF Continental Cup where they finished 3rd in the group, after suffering losses to Latvian side Juniors Riga and the Ukrainian Sokil Kyiv, but they did manage a victory over Romanian outfit SC Miercurea Ciuc. They played in the Continental Cup the following year, finishing 2nd in their group having beaten HK Vojvodina and KHK Crvena zvezda, both Yugoslavian teams, but suffering a heavy loss to Ukrainian side HC Berkut-Kyiv. The 2009–10 Cup saw Välk 494 represent Estonia once again, beating the Lithuanian side SC Energija in Overtime, whilst suffering heavy losses against Kazakhstan's Saryarka Karaganda and KS Cracovia Kraków of Poland. Välk 494 would once again participate in the 2011–12 edition, comfortably beating Turkish side Başkent Yıldızları, before being beaten themselves by White Caps Turnhout of Belgium.

In 2020 Välk 494 took place in the inaugural Baltic Hockey League, a competition made up of two teams from each of Estonia, Latvia and Lithuania. They finished top of their group after beating Kaunas Hockey, however, their final game against HK Mogo was cancelled after 4 of the Välk 494 squad tested positive for COVID-19. Despite this, both Välk 494 and HK Mogo qualified for the final round, as both teams had already beaten the Lithuanian team. The finals of the tournament are scheduled to take place in February 2021, having been postponed from December 2020 to several HK Mogo players contracting the virus.

=== Name ===
Välk is the Estonian word for lightning, whilst the 494 in the team name refers to the month and year the club was founded. From their inception through to 2007 the team was known as Tartu Välk 494, before changing their name to Tartu Kalev-Välk. This moniker lasted until 2018, when the team reverted to the Välk 494 brand.

== Roster ==
Updated December 30, 2024.

Goaltenders
Number		Player	Catches	Acquired	Place of Birth
1	(Latvia)	Ervins Muštukovs	-	2022	Riga, Latvia
30	(Estonia)	Kristjan Särki	-	2022	Tartu, Estonia
31	(Estonia)	Daniil Seppenen	-	2023	Narva, Estonia
33	(Estonia)	Juri Bahturin	L	2019	Tartu, Estonia

Defencemen
Number		Player	Shoots	Position	Acquired	Place of Birth
2	(Estonia)	Matvei Kalamees	-	D	2024	Tartu, Estonia
9	(Latvia)	Andrejs Bogdanovs	-	D	2024	Riga, Latvia
17	(Estonia)	Anatoli Jakovlev	L	D	2010	Narva, Estonia
18	(Latvia)	Georgijs Pujacs	-	D	2024	Riga, Latvia
26	(Estonia)	Taavi Ahman	L	D	2021	Tartu, Estonia
71	(Latvia)	Aleksejs Popovs	-	D	2022	Riga, Latvia
79	(Latvia)	Didzis Jansons	-	D	2023	Riga, Latvia
88	(Latvia)	Aleksanders Galkins	-	D	2024	Daugavpils, Latvia
99	(Estonia)	Ilja Simagin	-	D	2021	Narva, Estonia

Forwards
Number		Player	Shoots	Position	Acquired	Place of Birth
5	(Estonia)	Mihail Polzunov	-	F	2024	Tartu, Estonia
11	(Latvia)	Nikita Zantmans	-	F	2022	Riga, Latvia
12	(Estonia)	Dmitri Kuznetsov	L	F	2017	Tartu, Estonia
16	(Estonia)	Otar Sakhokia	L	F	2021	Tartu, Estonia
19	(Estonia)	Harri Koll	L	F	2019	Jõhvi, Estonia
27	(Estonia)	Aleksander Bogdanov	-	F	2023	Narva, Estonia
38	(Estonia)	Marcos Timmusk	-	F	2023	Tartu, Estonia
77	(Estonia)	Vassili Titarenko	R	F	2004	Kohtla-Järve, Estonia
78	(Estonia)	Andrei Solovjov	-	F	2023	Tartu, Estonia
87	(Ukraine)	Oleksii Voitsekhovskyi	L	F	2018	Kyiv, Ukraine
92	(Latvia)	Kirills Tambijevs	-	F	2022	Riga, Latvia
95	(Estonia)	Olev Kork	-	F	2013	Tartu, Estonia

== Honours ==
Meistriliiga Championships:

- 1997, 1999, 2000, 2002, 2003, 2008, 2011, 2012, 2015, 2019, 2020, 2021, 2022, 2025

Estonian Cup:

- 1997 & 1998
