= Kohtla-Järve Viru Sputnik =

Estonian ice hockey team

Viru Sputnik
- City: Kohtla-Järve, Estonia
- League: Unibet Hokiliiga
- Founded: 2003
- Home arena: Kohtla-Järve Ice Hall
- Colours
- Website: www.virusputnik.ee

Viru Sputnik is a professional ice hockey team based in Kohtla-Järve, Estonia. The team competes in the Meistriliiga, the highest league in Estonia. The team plays its home arena at Kohtla-Järve Ice Hall.

== Estonian Championship (Meistriliiga) history ==
The team regularly participated in the Meistriliiga hockey league from its inception until the 2016–2017 season. It won the title once, in the 2010 season.

The team returned to Meistriliiga competition for the 2021–2022 season.

== Honours ==
Meistriliiga Championships:

- 2010, 2026
