= Narva PSK =

Ice hockey team in narva, Estonia

- City: Narva, Estonia
- League: Unibet Hokiliiga
- Founded: 1956; 70 years ago
- Home arena: Narva Jäähall (capacity: 1,500)
- Colours
- General manager: Leonid Gulov
- Head coach: Ilya Ilin
- Captain: Georgi Vassiljev
- Website: https://uus.npsk.ee/

Narva PSK (Estonian: Narva Paemurru Spordikool) is an amateur ice hockey team based in Narva, Estonia. The team competes in the Unibet Hokiliiga, the highest league in Estonia. The team plays its home games at the Narva Ice Hall.

== History ==
"Krenholm" from Narva was one of the most decorated hockey clubs in Estonia. It first became champion in 1967. Before the collapse of the USSR, it was champion 8 times. It became champion 8 more times during the years of independence.

Due to financial problems, the club was disbanded in 2010, but in 2011 it was recreated as "Narva PSK".

In February 2016, it became champion of Estonia ahead of schedule. In March 2017, the team won gold medals again and in the autumn of the same year, they competed in the 2017–18 IIHF Continental Cup, where they were in the same group as HC Donbass of Ukraine, Polish side GKS Tychy and Latvian outfit HK Kurbads, but failed to pass the second round of qualification, finishing fourth in the group.

Narva PSK were originally scheduled to be part of the inaugural Baltic Hockey League, however they were unable to participate as a result of the COVID-19 pandemic, and subsequently HC Everest took their place.

In 2024, seven years later, Narva hockey players won the Estonian championship and again represented the country in the IIHF Continental Cup in group B, the games of which were held in Narva.

Over the following two seasons (2024/2025 and 2025/2026), PSK reached the finals of the Estonian Championship but lost both times, walking away with only the silver medal.

== Honours ==
Estonian Championships:

Gold medal (19): 1967, 1969, 1971, 1973, 1975, 1986, 1988, 1990, 1991, 1992, 1993, 1994, 1995, 1996, 1998, 2001, 2016, 2017, 2024

Silver medal (16): 1968, 1970, 1974, 1980, 1981, 1987, 1997, 1999, 2000, 2002, 2003, 2004, 2015, 2019, 2025, 2026

Bronze medal (10): 1982, 1983, 1984, 1985, 1989, 2005, 2007, 2008, 2013, 2014

== PSK age groups at the Estonian Championships and their results ==
Season 2023–24
Group	Number of players	Coach	Place in the group
Unibet	28	Ilja Ilin	1
U20	21	Vladimir Tsiprovski	2
U17	20	Vladimir Tsiprovski	2
U14-1	15	Aleksandr Šljapnikov	2
U14-2	15	Aleksandr Šljapnikov	3
U12-1	12	Rais Davletkildejev	-
U12-2	11	Rais Davletkildejev	-
U10-1	14 + 14	Igor Ossipenkov	-
U8	13 +14	Ilja Ilin	-

Season 2024–25
Group	Number of players	Coach	Place in the group
Unibet	26	Ilja Ilin	2
U19	14	Vladimir Tsiprovski	3
U16	15	Aleksandr Šljapnikov	3
U14	16	Aleksandr Šljapnikov	3
U12-1	13	Maksim Anohhin	-
U10-1	12	Igor Ossipenkov	-
U8	14	Ilja Ilin	-

Season 2025-26
Group	Number of players	Coach	Place in the group
Unibet	25	Ilja Ilin	2
U19	21	Vladimir Tsiprovski	3
U16	20	Aleksandr Šljapnikov	3
U14	26	Maksim Anohhin	4
U12-1	21	Igor Ossipenkov	-
U10-1	16	Ilja Ilin	-
U10-2	14	Ilja Ilin	-
U8	12 + 18	Igor Ossipenkov / Maksim Anohhin	-

== Notable coaches ==
- Alexander Romantsov
- Rais Davletkildejev
- Vladimir Tsiprovski
- Aleksander Kolpakov
- Igor Ossipenkov
- Aleksandr Šljapnikov
