= Estonian Basketball All-Star Game =

- Status: Inactive
- Inaugurated: 2000-01
- Most recent: 2005-06
- Organizer: Korvpalli Meistriliiga

The Estonian Basketball All-Star Game was an annual basketball event in Estonia, organised by the Korvpalli Meistriliiga. It was established in 2000. The event was mostly held at the end or the beginning of the year and consisted of an all-star game, a three-point shoot contest and slam-dunk exhibition. Many ledendary Estonian players like Martin Müürsepp and Aivar Kuusmaa have played in the All-Star Game.

== List of games ==
Bold: Team that won the game.

Year	Date	Team	Score	Team	MVP
2000	December 29	**All Stars**	**122**-115	Tartu Rock	
2002	February 17	Estonian NT	116-116	League All-Stars	(Estonia) Andre Pärn
2005		**Imports**	**121**-102	Estonia	(United States) Jermaine Green
2006		All Stars	91-**110**	**Aivar Kuusmaa Dream Team**	(Estonia) Martin Müürsepp

== Score sheets (2000-2006) ==
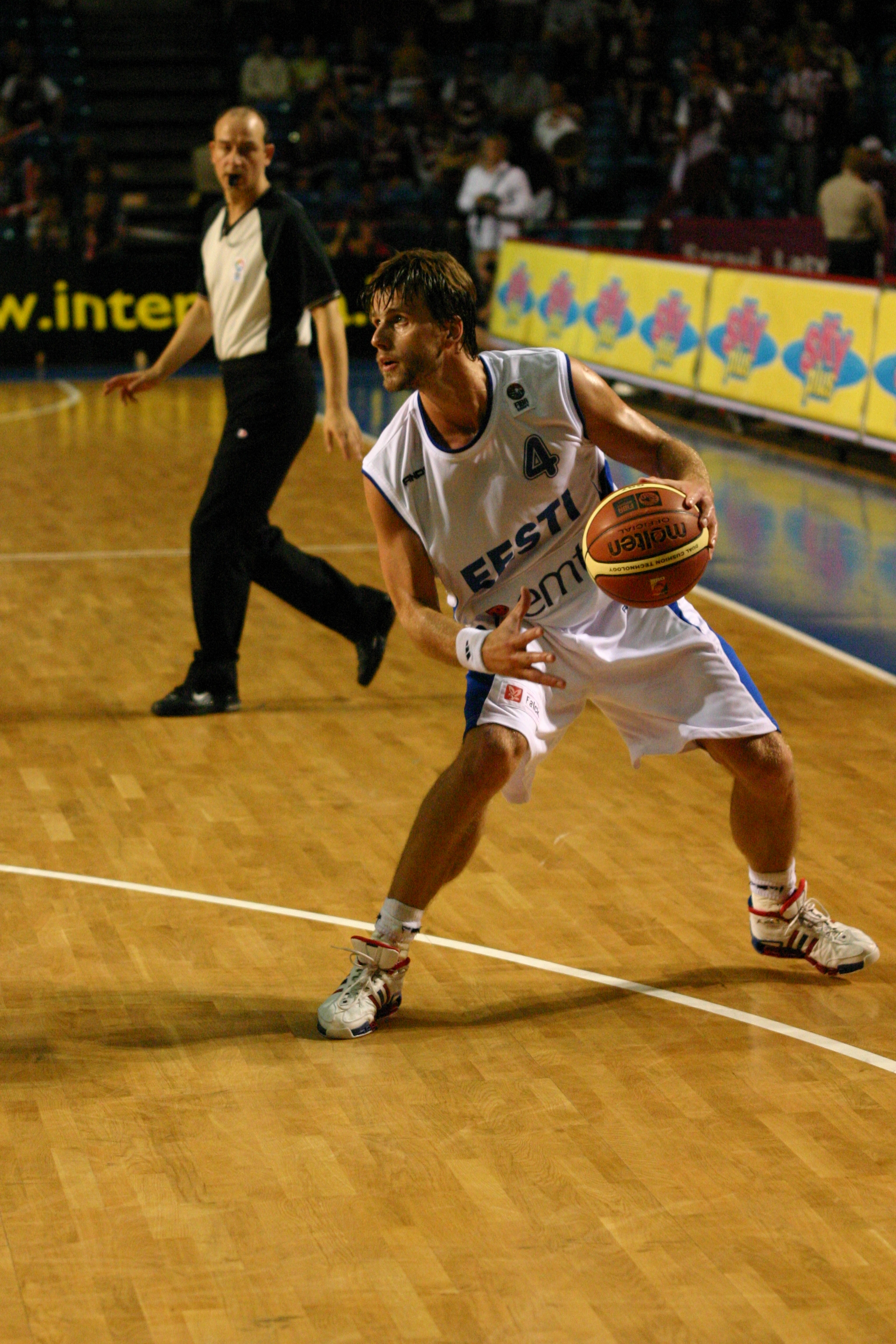
Tanel Tein was the winner in the 2000 Three-Point Shoot Contest.

- All-Star Game 2000-01:

DATE: 29 December 2000
VENUE: Saku Suurhall, Tallinn
SCORE: All-Stars – Tartu Rock 122–115

Tartu Rock:

All-Stars: Rauno Pehka, Aivar Kuusmaa, Toomas Liivak, Jaanus Liivak, Tanel Tein, Toomas Kandimaa, Indrek Rumma, Dustin Berrien, Gerald Eaker, Margus Metstak. Coach: Andres Sober and Juri Neissaar

Topscorers: Indrek Varblane 25 (Tartu Rock) - Aivar Kuusmaa 24)

- All-Star Game 2001-02:

DATE: 17 February 2002
VENUE:
SCORE: All-Stars – Estonian NT 116–116

Topscorers: Andre Parn 25, Aivar Kuusmaa 18, Kandimaa 15 (Estonian NT) - Shanks 18, Igor Kurashov 16, Pihela 14 (All Stars)

- All-Star Game 2004-05:

DATE:
VENUE:
SCORE: Imports – Estonia 121–102

Imports: Jermaine Green 26, Mindaugas Mockus 17, Mielke 12, Airosius 11, Vaskys 11, Frier 10, Raziulis 9, Bogdanov 9, Skadas 8, Beacham 8, Gonzalez (DNP). Head coach Andres Sober

Estonia: Lokutshievski 16, Tagamets 15, Tanel Sokk 15, Armpalu 14, Paade 11, Dorbek 9, Riis 9, Kaljula 7, Makke 4, Rannula 2, Vasar (DNP). Head coach: Tonu Lust

- All-Star Game 2005-06:

DATE:
VENUE: Saku Suurhall, Tallinn, att: 5.000
SCORE: Aivar Kuusma Dream Team - Estonian League All Stars 110–91

Estonian League All Stars: Marko Riis, Marek Doronin, Tanel Sokk

Aivar Kuusma Dream Team: Aivar Kuusmaa, Martin Müürsepp, Gert Kullamae

== Three-Point Shoot Contest ==
Year	Player	Team
2000	(Estonia) Tanel Tein	Tartu Rock
2002	(Estonia) Rauno Pehka	BC Kalev
2006	(Estonia) Gert Kullamäe	Tartu Rock

== Slam-Dunk champions ==
Year	Player	Team
2000	(United States) (Mexico) Gerald Eaker	BC Kalev
2002	(Estonia) Janar Talts	TTÜ-A. Le Coq
2006	(Estonia) Marko Riis	Triobet/Dalkia

== Topscorers ==
Year	Player	Points	Team
2000	(Estonia) Indrek Varblane	25	Tartu Rock
2002	(Estonia) Andre Parn	25	TTÜ/A. Le Coq
2005	(United States) Jermaine Green	26	Rakvere JK Tarvas
2006	(Estonia) Martin Müürsepp	26	(Russia) UNICS Kazan

== Players with most appearances ==
Player	All-Star	Editions	Notes
(Estonia) Aivar Kuusmaa	3	2000–01, 2001–02, 2005-06	The 2006 edition was his last ever career match after 307 games and 5474 points in the Estonian League
(Estonia) Tanel Sokk	2	2004–05, 2005-06	
(Estonia) Marko Riis	2	2004–05, 2005-06	1x Slam dunk winner

== See also ==
- KML All-Star Five
- Baltic Basketball All-Star Game
