= 2007–08 FIBA EuroCup =

FIBA EuroCup
- Season: 2007–08
- Teams: 32

Finals
- Champions: (Latvia) Barons LMT (1st title)
- Runners-up: (Belgium) Dexia Mons-Hainaut
- Third place: (Cyprus) EKA AEL
- Fourth place: (Estonia) Tartu Ülikool/Rock
- Final Four MVP: (Lithuania) Giedrius Gustas

Statistical leaders
Points	(United States) Adrian Henning	20.6
Rebounds	(Nigeria) Kenny Adeleke	11.0
Assists	(Croatia) Jakov Vladović	6.8

The 2007-08 FIBA EuroCup was the fifth season of FIBA's European professional competition and the last under the name EuroCup which is now used for the formerly known ULEB Cup. The competition, which was renamed the FIBA EuroChallenge in July 2008, featured 38 competing teams, from 23 countries following the abolition of the FIBA EuroCup Challenge in 2007. The draw for the groups was held on August 5, 2007, at the Kempinski Hotel in Munich.

The 2007–08 FIBA EuroCup, organized by FIBA Europe, was the fifth season of the competition regarded as the third-strongest pan-European club basketball competition, behind the Euroleague and ULEB Cup, the latter of which was renamed the Eurocup for 2008–09.

== Format ==
In all, 38 teams were involved. Teams from the lowest ranked countries or teams who took a lower place in their national championship played in elimination round 1. The winners of elimination round 1 met teams who took a higher place in their national championship in Elimination Round 2. The winners from Elimination Round 2, advanced to the group stage (qualifying round). After the group stage, teams played a Quarter Final Round and then a Final Four.

=== Elimination rounds ===
In all in elimination round 1, 12 teams. Each team plays two games (home and away). The winners from elimination round 1 advance to elimination round 2. There also two games (home and away). The winners of elimination round 2 advance to the group stage (the qualifying round).

=== Qualifying round ===
In all in the group 16 teams. It: Group A, Group B, Group C, Group D. The matches plays round-robin competition (home and away). Top two places advance to the quarter-final.

=== Quarter-final ===
Top two places of the groups advance to quarter-finals. The quarter-final games will be played two game (if need three games). The winners of the quarter-final round advance to the Final Four.

=== Final Four ===
The Final Four matches include the semi-finals and final, and the match for third place. It was held on April 18 and April 20, in Cyprus, Spyros Kyprianou Arena.

== Team allocation ==
There were 6 domestic champions and 3 runners-up. The labels in the parentheses show how each team qualified for the place of its starting round (TH: title holders;):

- 1st, 2nd, 3rd, 4th, 5th, etc.: League position after eventual Playoffs
- CW: Cup winners

(Greece) PAOK (6th)	(Russia) Lokomotiv Rostov (5th)	(Croatia) Zagreb (3rd)	(France) Cholet (7th)
(Greece) Olympia Larissa (7th)	(Russia) Spartak Saint Petersburg (8th)	(Croatia) Cedevita Zagreb (5th)	(France) BCM Gravelines (8th)
(Greece) Maroussi (8th)	(Russia) CSK VSS-Samara (9th)	(Romania) Elba Timişoara (4th)	(Belgium) Dexia Mons-Hainaut (6th)
(Greece) AEK Athens (9th)	(Russia) Ural Great (10th)	(Romania) U Mobitelco Cluj-Napoca (5th)	(Bosnia and Herzegovina) Igokea (3rd)
(Greece) Olympiada Patras (10th)	(Ukraine) Cherkaski Mavpy (3rd)	(Bulgaria) Spartak Pleven (6th)	(Czech Republic) Prostějov (3rd)
(Cyprus) Proteas EKA AEL (1st)	(Ukraine) Khimik (4th)	(Denmark) Bakken Bears (1st)	(Estonia) Tartu Rock (1st)
(Cyprus) APOEL (2nd)	(Ukraine) Dnipro (6th)	(Finland) Lappeenranta (6th)	(Georgia (country)) Energy Invest Rustavi (1st)
(Cyprus) Keravnos (3rd)	(Ukraine) Odesa (9th)	(Iceland) KR (2nd)	(Israel) Ironi Nahariya (5th)
(North Macedonia) Strumica 2005 (1st)	(Latvia) Barons/LMT (3rd)	(Turkey) Banvit (7th)	(Sweden) Plannja (1st)
(Netherlands) MyGuide Amsterdam (6th)	(Slovenia) Zlatorog Laško (4th)		

== Preliminary rounds ==
=== First elimination round ===
Team 1	Agg.	Team 2	1st leg	2nd leg
Energy Invest Rustavi (Georgia (country))	140–188	(Netherlands) MyGuide Amsterdam	77–87	63–101
Dnipro (Ukraine)	146–145	(Romania) Elba Timişoara	64–74	82–71
Cedevita Zagreb (Croatia)	145–147	(North Macedonia) Strumica 2005	76–72	69–75
Spartak Pleven (Bulgaria)	147–156	(Greece) Olympiada Patras	76–71	71–85
Spartak Saint Petersburg (Russia)	174–162	(Ukraine) Odesa	86–76	88–86
Igokea (Bosnia and Herzegovina)	139–133	(Denmark) Bakken Bears	68–62	71–71

=== Second elimination round ===
Team 1	Agg.	Team 2	1st leg	2nd leg
Olympiada Patras (Greece)	126–157	(Russia) Ural Great	66–80	60–77
Spartak Saint Petersburg (Russia)	146–140	(Greece) Maroussi	62–65	84–75
Strumica (North Macedonia)	126–154	(Russia) Lokomotiv Rostov	57–67	69–87
Igokea (Bosnia and Herzegovina)	171–179	(Ukraine) Khimik	102–80	69–99
Barons LMT (Latvia)	161–160	(Israel) Ironi Nahariya	81–77	80–83
MyGuide Amsterdam (Netherlands)	125–161	(Belgium) Dexia Mons-Hainaut	63–73	62–88
Dnipro (Ukraine)	122–168	(Cyprus) AEL Limassol	53–64	69–104
Plannja (Sweden)	143–175	(Russia) CSK VSS-Samara	73–91	70–84
KR (Iceland)	162–191	(Turkey) Banvit	79–96	83–95
Zlatorog Laško (Slovenia)	146–155	(Greece) Olympia Larissa	64–72	82–83
Lappeenranta (Finland)	173–166	(Cyprus) Keravnos	87–71	86–95
Tartu Ülikool/Rock (Estonia)	170–141	(Czech Republic) Prostějov	94–69	76–72
PAOK (Greece)	150–139	(Romania) U Mobitelco Cluj-Napoca	79–74	71–65
AEK Athens (Greece)	146–160	(France) Cholet	91–82	55–78
Zagreb (Croatia)	185–150	(France) BCM Gravelines	85–62	100–88
APOEL (Cyprus)	173–178	(Ukraine) Cherkaski Mavpy	90–74	83–104

== Qualifying round ==
A total number of sixteen teams participated in the qualifying round. They were divided over four groups of in each four teams. The top two teams in each group advance to quarter-final playoffs. The matches were played in a round-robin competition.

=== Group A ===
Pos	Team	Pld	W	L	PF	PA	PD	Pts	Qualification	TAR	SAM	LAP	PAOK
1	(Estonia) Tartu University Rock	6	5	1	481	438	+43	11	Advance to quarter-finals	—	77–57	78–72	90–80
2	(Russia) CSK VSS-Samara	6	5	1	459	426	+33	11	Advance to quarter-finals	77–65	—	94–82	80–61
3	(Finland) Lappeenranta	6	1	5	483	506	−23	7		94–102	76–78	—	83–74
4	(Greece) PAOK Marfin	6	1	5	418	471	−53	7		58–69	65–73	80–76	—

Source: EuroCup

=== Group B ===
Pos	Team	Pld	W	L	PF	PA	PD	Pts	Qualification	MON	URA	MAV	BAN
1	(Belgium) Dexia Mons-Hainaut	6	4	2	449	422	+27	10	Advance to quarter-finals	—	81–60	72–67	85–81
2	(Russia) Ural Great	6	4	2	461	429	+32	10	Advance to quarter-finals	60–58	—	93–73	77–74
3	(Ukraine) Cherkaski Mavpy	6	3	3	465	507	−42	9		76–72	72–101	—	87–81
4	(Turkey) Banvit	6	1	5	473	490	−17	7		78–81	71–70	88–90	—

Source: EuroCup

=== Group C ===
Pos	Team	Pld	W	L	PF	PA	PD	Pts	Qualification	AEL	ZAG	OLY	SPA
1	(Cyprus) Proteas EKA AEL	6	4	2	494	455	+39	10	Advance to quarter-finals	—	103–80	91–71	72–71
2	Zagreb Croatia Osiguranje	6	4	2	460	461	−1	10	Advance to quarter-finals	82–77	—	63–58	80–76
3	(Greece) Olympia Larissa	6	3	3	400	416	−16	9		74–70	64–63	—	58–63
4	(Russia) Spartak Saint Petersburg	6	1	5	436	458	−22	7		77–81	83–92	66–75	—

Source: EuroCup

=== Group D ===
Pos	Team	Pld	W	L	PF	PA	PD	Pts	Qualification	BAR	KHI	LOK	CHO
1	(Latvia) Barons LMT	6	4	2	463	439	+24	10	Advance to quarter-finals	—	78–84	87–75	76–66
2	(Ukraine) Khimik	6	4	2	449	436	+13	10	Advance to quarter-finals	65–71	—	78–62	75–72
3	(Russia) Lokomotiv Rostov	6	2	4	423	438	−15	8		69–73	76–65	—	84–64
4	(France) Cholet	6	2	4	430	461	−31	8		80–78	77–82	71–66	—

Source: EuroCup

== Quarter-finals ==
Team 1	Agg.	Team 2	Game 1	Game 2	Game 3
Tartu University Rock (Estonia)	2–1	(Russia) Ural Great	78–75	61–68	89–77
Dexia Mons-Hainaut (Belgium)	2–0	(Russia) CSK VSS-Samara	92–66	87–86	
Proteas EKA AEL (Cyprus)	2–0	(Ukraine) Khimik	70–65	87–76	
Barons LMT (Latvia)	2–1	Zagreb Croatia Osiguranje	67–58	74–80	96–91

== Final Four ==
The Final Four was held from 18 until 20 April 2008 in Limassol, Spyros Kyprianou Arena.

Semi-finals
18 April
(Estonia) Tartu University Rock	82
(Latvia) Barons LMT	88
18 April
(Belgium) Dexia Mons-Hainaut	70
(Cyprus) Proteas EKA AEL	55

Final
20 April
(Latvia) Barons LMT	63
(Belgium) Dexia Mons-Hainaut	62
Third place
20 April
(Estonia) Tartu University Rock	70
(Cyprus) Proteas EKA AEL	79
