= List of basketball clubs in Estonia =

This is the list of basketball clubs operating in Estonia. The list is incomplete.

Name	Location (city/town)	Existing years	Further info	Image/logo
Audentes/Noortekoondis				
KK Baltika				
KK HITO				
Triobet/Dalkia				
BC Kalev	Tallinn			
Kohila SK				
BC Kraft Mööbel/Kohila				
Pärnu basketball team				
BC Rakvere Tarvas				
Rapla KK				
TTÜ-A. Le Coq				

== Unsorted ==
- Audentese Spordiklubi (for women)
- BIG/new balance Rapla
- Ehitustööriist/TTÜ
- EKE Projekt
- EMÜ basketball team
- Fausto BC (BC Fausto)
- G4S Noorteliiga (for women)
- Harju KEK
- Kalev/Rapla BC (BC Kalev/Rapla)
- Keskrajooni SK
- Kuremaa SK
- Kuressaare SK
- Rakvere KK (KK Rakvere)
- Rakvere Palliklubi (Rakvere PK)
- Taba 89 KK (KK Taba 89)
- Tallinna Kalev (1991–2005) (Tallinna Kalev (basketball club))
- Tallinna Metallist
- Tallinna NMKÜ
- Tallinna Russ
- Tallinna Standard
- Tallinna Ülikool KK (KK Tallinna Ülikool (for women))
- Tallinna Võitleja
- Tartu Fausto BC (BC Tartu Fausto)
- Tartu KK
- Tartu Maja
- Tartu NMKÜ
- Tartu Ülikool/Kalev (for women)
- Tarvas RSK (RSK Tarvas)
- TPÜ/Kiili
- Viimsi KK (KK Viimsi)
- Võru KK
