= Margus Metstak =

Estonian basketball player (born 1961)

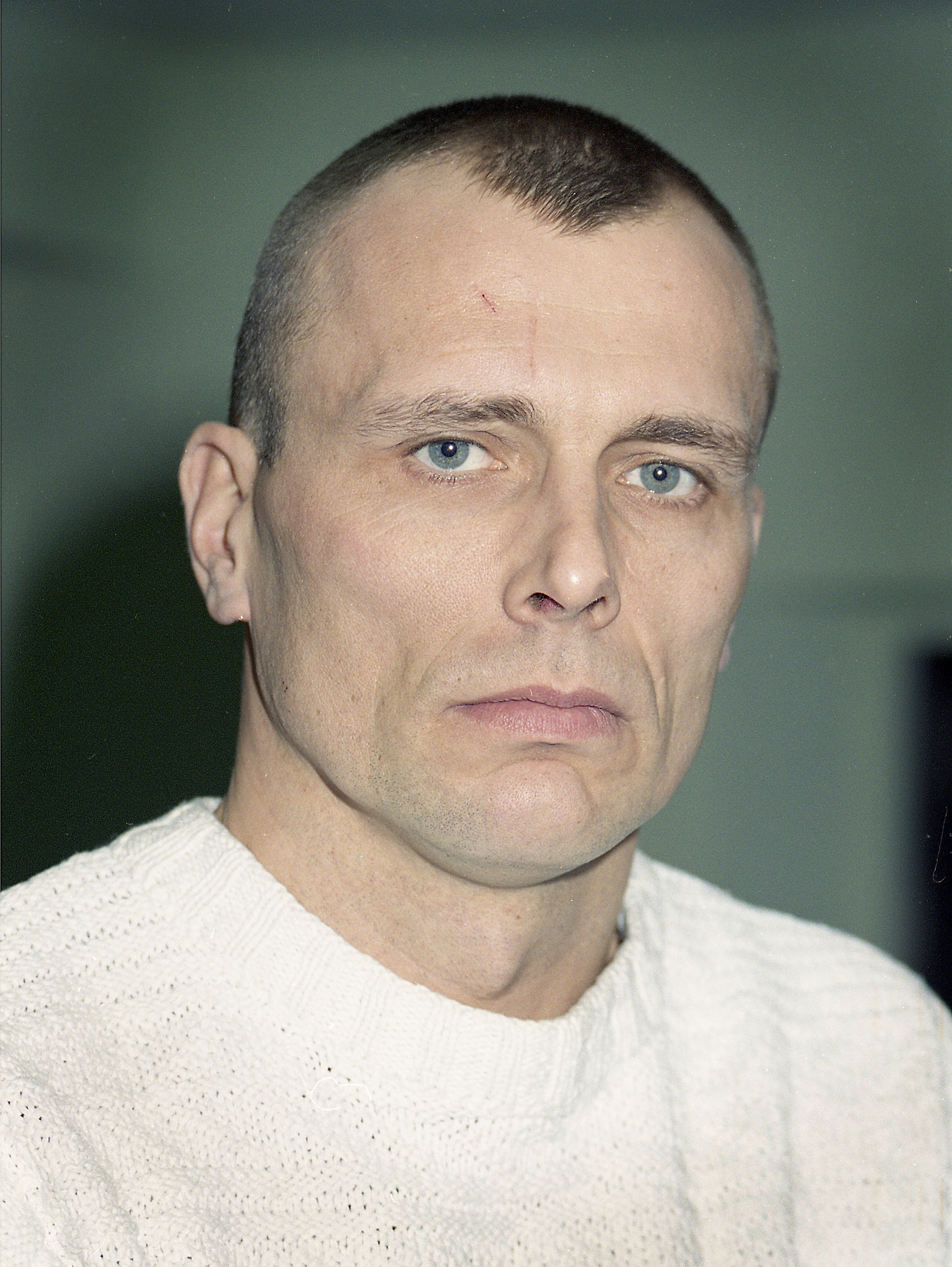
- Margus Metstak (1999)

Personal information
- Born: 16 June 1961 (age 65) Kallavere, Estonia
- Listed height: 6 ft 9 in (2.06 m)
- Listed weight: 242 lb (110 kg)

Career information
- Playing career: 1979–2007
- Position: Center

Career history
- 1981–1989: TPI
- 1989–1991: Kalev
- 1991–1992: Namika Lahti
- 1992–1993: Amicale
- 1993–1994: Speyer
- 1994–1995: Paderborn Baskets
- 1995–1996: Kalev
- 1996–2001: Tallinna Ülikoolid-A. Le Coq
- 2001–2002: Czarni Słupsk
- 2002–2003: TTÜ/A. Le Coq
- 2003–2007: BC Tallinna Kalev

Career highlights
- USSR League champion (1991); 5× Estonian Champion (1984, 1985, 1996, 1997, 1999); 5× Estonian Cup Winner (1992, 1996, 2001); 3x Estonian Basketball Player of the Year (1995, 1997, 1998)

Margus Metstak (born 16 June 1961) is a retired Estonian professional basketball player who played mostly at the center position.

== Club career ==
=== Early career ===
Margus Metstak started his career at the age of 18 with Tallinn Pedagogical Institute for whom he played in Estonian SSR Championships until the dissolution of the Soviet Union. However, he improved and went on to play professionally for Soviet Union top-flight team Kalev Tallinn. In 1982, only his second year as a professional, the team reached the semi-finals of the Soviet Basketball Cup and took the bronze medal.

=== Soviet champion ===
The biggest breakthrough came in 1991, when Kalev won the Soviet Union Basketball League and became the last official champions of the collapsed empire (in fact, there was a league functioning with the same association the following year, but with only clubs from Commonwealth of Independent States competing). Kalev won the regular season with 18–4 record. In quarter-finals they beat ASK Kyiv 2–0 (90:75, 100:91) and went on to play in the semi-finals against Latvian BK VEF Rīga. The Latvian team won the first game 94–87, but Kalev managed to win two games in a row (107:90, 113:96) and the series overall 2–1. In the finals Estonians won both games against BC Spartak Saint Petersburg and won the first and last Soviet championship for Kalev.

=== Foreign clubs ===
Metstak played briefly for Korisliiga team NMKY Lahti in late 1990, before returning to Estonia in January 1991. Following the big triumph, he went back to Finland for a season, before making a brief move to Luxembourg's team Amicale Basket. After being one of the main figures of Estonia national basketball team's successful EuroBasket 1993 in Germany, Margus Metstak received offers to play in Basketball Bundesliga for TSV Speyer and Paderborn Baskets, respectively. For the 2001–2002 season, at the age of 40, he earned his last contract from abroad, joining Polish side Czarni Słupsk.

=== Last years ===
After the spell with the Polish team, the then 41-year-old center moved to TTÜ/A. Le Coq. Metstak played the last few years of his career with his hometown club, BC Pirita, as a semi-professional. He has been working as a coach for TTÜ/Kalev and re-established BC Tallinna Kalev.

== National team ==
Metstak's national career started in 1981, when he represented Estonian SSR national team. In 1991, when Estonia regained their independence from Soviet Union, he was a regular center for the Estonia national basketball team.

=== 1993 European Championships ===
Margus Metstak was on the squad for both the EuroBasket 1993 and EuroBasket 2001 competitions, the only times Estonia has qualified for that tournament. In 1993, the Estonian team surprised all of Europe, winning group D ahead of eventual European champion Germany and strong ex-Yugoslavian side Slovenia. In the knock-out stages they lost to Russia, beat Bosnia and Herzegovina and were beaten in the 5th-place game by Spain. This meant that Estonia would not qualify to the 1994 FIBA World Championship.

=== 2001 European Championships ===
In 2001, 40-year-old Metstak scored 8.3 points and took 6 rebounds per game, when Estonia finished in the disappointing last place. Margus Metstak is to date the oldest basketballer to play at the EuroBasket.

== Books ==
- Lään, Vello; Ibrus, Märt (2006). Eesti korvpall portreed. Eesti Korvpalliliit. pp. 289–297. ISBN 9949-406-68-4.
