= Estonian Basketball Player of the Year =

Estonian award

The Estonian Basketball Player of the Year is an annual award given to the best performing Estonian basketball player of the respective season. From 1995 to 2001 the award was decided by a poll of Estonian sports journalists and given by the magazine Sporditäht. Until 1999, only players who played for a domestic club were eligible for the award. In 2001, players who represented the Estonian national team were added to the vote. Since 2004, the award has been presented by the Estonian Basketball Association. The current holder of the award is Siim-Sander Vene.

== Winners ==
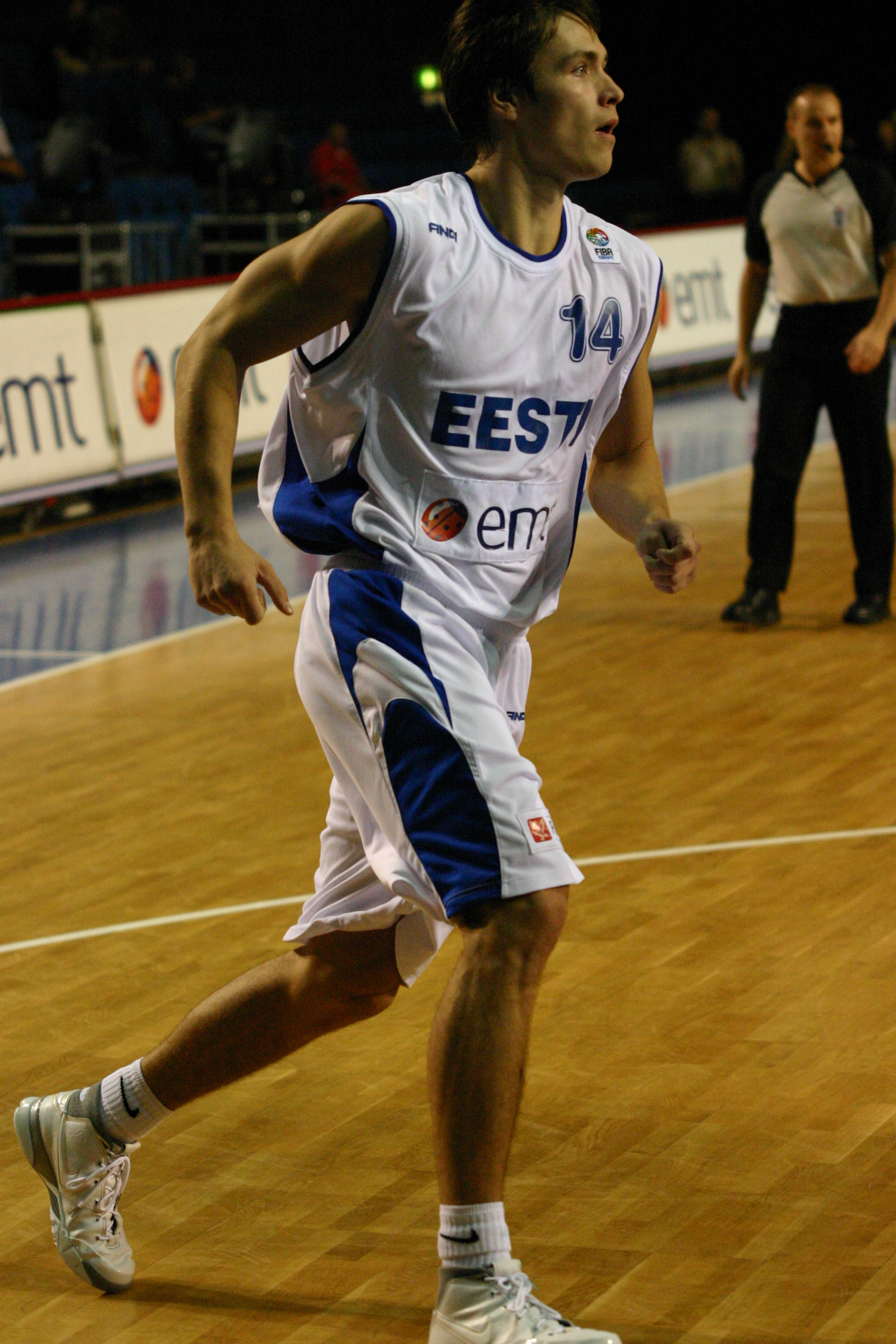
Kristjan Kangur has won the award a record eight times.

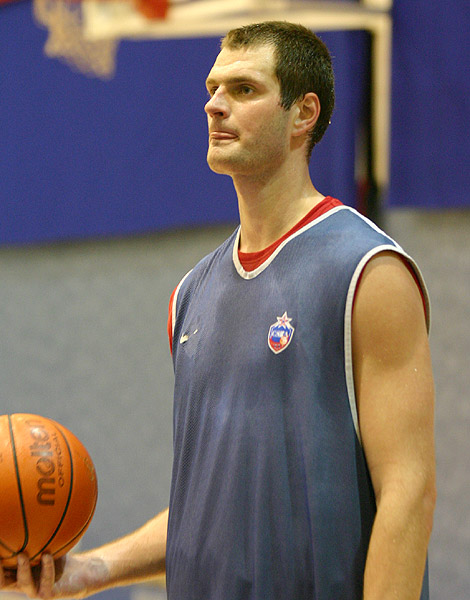
Martin Müürsepp has won the award four times.

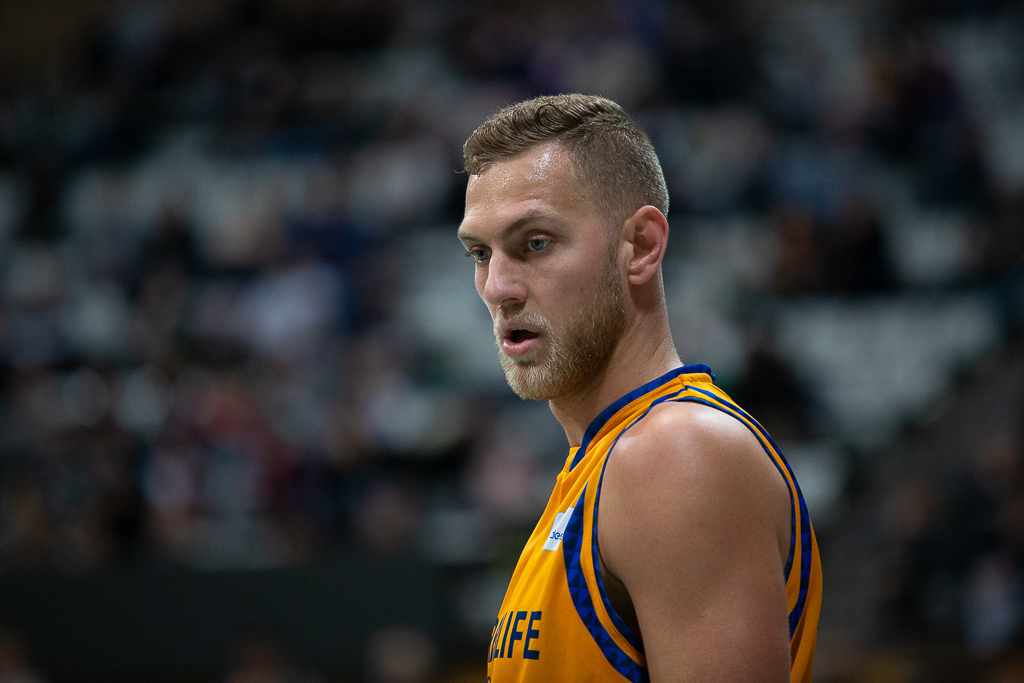
Siim-Sander Vene is a three-time winner.

	Denotes player who is still active
Player (X)	Denotes the number of times the player has won the award

Year	Player	Position	Team	Ref
1995	Margus Metstak	Center	(Estonia) Kalev	
1996	Martin Müürsepp	Forward	(Estonia) Kalev	
1997	Margus Metstak (2)	Center	(Estonia) Tallinn	
1998	Margus Metstak (3)	Center	(Estonia) Tallinn	
1999	Gert Kullamäe	Guard	(Estonia) Kalev	
2000–01	Martin Müürsepp (2)	Forward	(Greece) AEK	
2003–04	Martin Müürsepp (3)	Forward	(Russia) UNICS Kazan	
2004–05	Martin Müürsepp (4)	Forward	(Russia) CSKA Moscow	
2005–06	Gert Kullamäe (2)	Guard	(Netherlands) EiffelTowers Den Bosch	
2006–07	Valmo Kriisa	Guard	(Estonia) Kalev/Cramo	
2007–08	Tanel Tein	Guard	(Estonia) Tartu Ülikool/Rock	
2008–09	Kristjan Kangur	Forward	(Estonia) Kalev/Cramo	
2009–10	Kristjan Kangur (2)	Forward	(Italy) Canadian Solar Bologna	
2010–11	Kristjan Kangur (3)	Forward	(Italy) Cimberio Varese	
2011–12	Kristjan Kangur (4)	Forward	(Italy) Cimberio Varese	
2012–13	Kristjan Kangur (5)	Forward	(Italy) Montepaschi Siena	
2013–14	Kristjan Kangur (6)	Forward	(Italy) EA7 Emporio Armani Milan	
2014–15	Kristjan Kangur (7)	Forward	(Italy) Openjobmetis Varese	
2015–16	Kristjan Kangur (8)	Forward	(Italy) Openjobmetis Varese	
2016–17	Siim-Sander Vene	Forward	(Russia) Nizhny Novgorod	
2017–18	Siim-Sander Vene (2)	Forward	(Italy) Openjobmetis Varese	
2018–19	Siim-Sander Vene (3)	Forward	(Spain) Herbalife Gran Canaria	

== Multiple-time winners ==
Rank	Player	Awards	Years
1	Kristjan Kangur	8	2009, 2010, 2011, 2012, 2013, 2014, 2015, 2016
2	Martin Müürsepp	4	1996, 2001, 2004, 2005
3	Margus Metstak	3	1995, 1997, 1998
3	Siim-Sander Vene	3	2017, 2018, 2019
5	Gert Kullamäe	2	1999, 2006
