= Toomas Kandimaa =

Estonian basketball player and coach

Tartu Ülikool
- Position: Assistant coach
- League: Korvpalli Meistriliiga; Estonian-Latvian Basketball League

Personal information
- Born: 19 June 1975 (age 51) Elva, Estonia
- Listed height: 1.94 m (6 ft 4 in)

Career information
- Playing career: 1990–2007
- Coaching career: 2009–present

Career history

Playing
- 1990–1991: Tartu Maja
- 1991–1992: Taba 89
- 1992–1993: Tartu
- 1993–1996: Baltika
- 1996–2003: Tartu Ülikool
- 2003–2005: Nybit
- 2005–2006: Tartu Ülikool
- 2006–2007: Valga

Coaching
- 2009–2020: Tartu Ülikool (assistant)
- 2020–2021: Tartu Ülikool
- 2021–present: Tartu Ülikool (assistant)

Career highlights
- 2× Estonian League champion (2000, 2001); KML All-Star Five (2002); As assistant coach: Estonian League champion (2026); Estonian Cup winner (2026)

Toomas Kandimaa (born 19 June 1975) is an Estonian basketball coach and former professional player who is currently the assistant coach for University of Tartu of the Korvpalli Meistriliiga. Kandimaa represented the Estonian national basketball team internationally.

== Estonian national team ==
As a member of the Estonian national team, Kandimaa competed at the EuroBasket 1993 and the EuroBasket 2001.
