= Varblane =

Varblane is an Estonian surname meaning sparrow.

The surname and its variants, Warblanne, Warblene, Wärblane, were given to villagers at the beginning of the 19th century after the serfdom was abolished in Estonia. Before that Estonian peasants did not have surnames. Since the surname is of Estonian origin, it did not undergo the change during the Estonization campaign in the interwar period.

Notable people with the surname include:

- Indrek Varblane (born 1958), Estonian volleyball player
- Hannes Varblane (1949–2022), Estonian poet
- Lembitu Varblane (1923–2013), Estonian teacher
- Mihkel Varblane (born 1999), Estonian volleyball player
- Reet Varblane (1952–2023), Estonian art historian
- Urmas Varblane (born 1961), Estonian economist
