= Andre Pärn =

Estonian basketball player

Personal information
- Born: September 21, 1977 (age 49) Tallinn, then part of Estonian SSR, Soviet Union
- Listed height: 6 ft 6 in (1.98 m)
- Listed weight: 200 lb (91 kg)

Career information
- Playing career: 1993–2015
- Position: Power forward
- Number: 22

Career history
- 1993–1994: Asto
- 1994–2000: Kalev
- 2000–2001: Plannja Basket
- 2001–2002: Leuven Bears
- 2002: Hotronic
- 2002–2004: TTÜ/A. Le Coq
- 2004–2005: BIG/new balance Rapla
- 2005–2006: BC Kalev
- 2006–2007: Pirita
- 2007–2008: Rakvere Tarvas
- 2008–2010: Tallinna Kalev
- 2010–2011: TTÜ/Kalev
- 2011–2015: Rapla

Andre Pärn (born 21 September 1977) is an Estonian former basketball player.

Andre Pärn started his basketball career in hometown Asto at the age of 16. Next season he moved to Estonian powerhouse Kalev until 2000. During the time, he won multiple national championships and cups. After six seasons with Kalev, Pärn moved to Swedish Plannja Basket where he played a successful season. The same summer he was a member of the Estonia national basketball team which played in the EuroBasket 2001 competition. He played his last game in December 2015 in Rapla.

Following the tournament with Team Estonia, he had his last foreign spell in Belgium with Leuven Bears. His later achievements include another Estonian championship title in 2006 but also a silver medal from the 3on3 Street ball World Championship in Moscow, Russia.

== Achievements ==
- Estonian Championship: 1993–94, 1994–95, 1995–96, 1997–98, 2005–06
- Streetball World Championships:
  - Runner-up: 2010
