= 1928 KML season =

1928 Estonian national championships in basketball

Korvpalli Meistriliiga
- Season: 1928
- Duration: 1 April 1928
- Games played: 1
- Teams: 2

Finals
- Champions: Tallinna Vitjas; 1st title
- Runners-up: Tallinna NMKÜ

The 1928 Korvpalli Meistriliiga was the 3rd season of the Estonian basketball league.

A single game was held on 1 April 1928 with Tallinna Vitjas defeating Tallinna NMKÜ 42–22.
