= Maarten van Gent =

Dutch basketball coach (1947–2025)

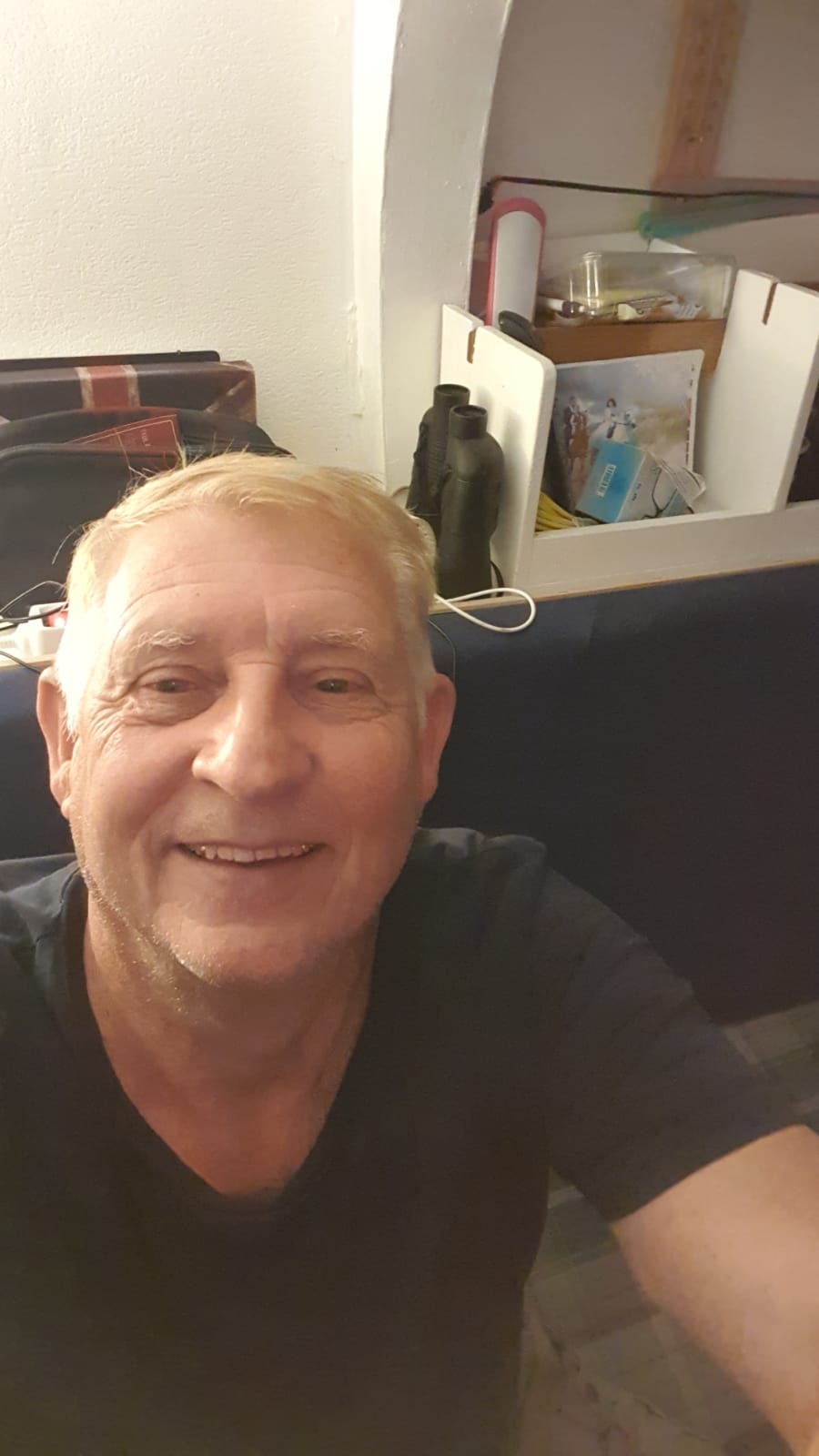

Biographical details
- Born: 22 March 1947; Rotterdam, Netherlands
- Died: 14 April 2025 (aged 78); Rakvere, Estonia

Coaching career (HC unless noted)

Club:
- 1970–1975: AMVJ Rotterdam
- 1975–1980: Frisol Rowic Dordrecht
- 1980–1982: Nationale Nederlanden Donar
- 1983–1984: Hatrans Haaksbergen
- 1984: Rotterdam Zuid
- 1984–1985: Sunair Oostende
- 1985–1988: Hellas Gent
- 1988–1989: Sunair Oostende
- 1989: Maccabi Brussels
- 1990–1991: BSW Weert
- 1991: Houthalen
- 1995: Houthalen
- 1996–1998: Tallinna Kalev
- 2000–2004: Ehitustööriist
- 2008–2009: Rotterdam Challengers
- 2009–2010: EiffelTowers

National team:
- 1997–1999: Estonia
- 2001–2003: Netherlands

Accomplishments and honors

Championships
- Dutch Champion (1982); Belgian Champion (1985); Estonian Champion (1996); Belgian Cup Winner (1985, 1989)

Awards
- DBL Coach of the Year (1984); KML Coach of the Year (1998)

Maarten Herman van Gent (22 March 1947 – 14 April 2025) was a Dutch basketball coach, manager, scout and businessman.

== Biography ==
Van Gent was born on 22 March 1947. He started playing basketball at age 17. He also played korfball and soccer in college. After serving in the Royal Netherlands Army in 1968, he became a physical education teacher. In 1970, at age 23, van Gent started coaching basketball teams. The first team was AMVJ Rotterdam. After five years with the team, he started coaching Frisol Rowic in Dordrecht. In 1982, he won the Dutch Championship with Nationale Nederlanden Donar. From 1984 to 1990, van Gent coached in Belgium and won the Belgian Championship in 1985 with Sunair Oostende. He quit coaching in 1991 after he was fired from Houthalen basketball team.

In 1992, he moved to Estonia and started working as a basketball agent for Globe Sports Management in Europe. In 1996, he started coaching again, this time in Estonia. He won the Estonian Championship in 1996 with Tallinna Kalev. From 1997 to 1999, he was also the coach of the Estonia national team. From 2000 to 2004 he coached Ehitustööriist and the Netherlands national team. In 2005, he again quit coaching and concentrated on business and managing. He also worked for three years as a scout for the NBA team the New York Knicks.

Van Gent returned to coaching in the 2008–2009 season at Rotterdam and again in the 2009–2010 season at EiffelTowers in Den Bosch after both teams fired their previous coaches during the season.

Maarten van Gent owned a real estate company named "Vangent Holding OU". He died in Rakvere, Estonia on 14 April 2025, at the age of 78.
