= Hugo Raudsepp =

Estonian writer and politician

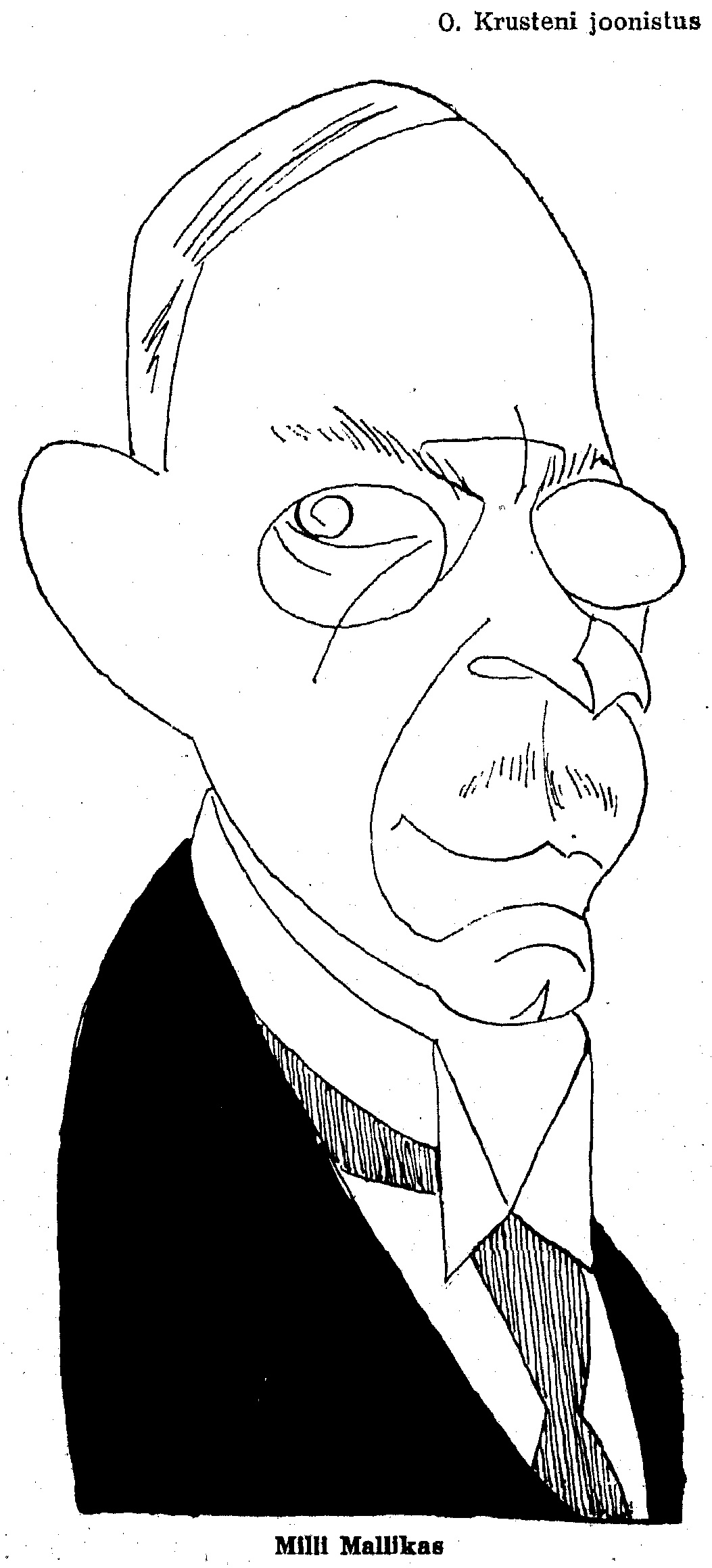
- Caricature of Hugo Raudsepp by Otto Krusten (1932)
- Born: 10 July 1883; Vaimastvere, Kreis Dorpat, Governorate of Livonia
- Died: 15 September 1952 (aged 69); Ozerlag, Irkutsk Oblast
- Writing career
- Period: 1920–1949
- Notable work: Mikumärdi

Hugo Raudsepp (10 July 1883 – 15 September 1952) was an influential and prolific Estonian playwright and politician. In 1951 he was deported to the Irkutsk region by the Soviet authorities, where he died.

== Life ==
Victor Paul Hugo Raudsepp was born the son of a distiller of Vaimastvere Manor. He first attended the local village and parish schools, then until 1900 the city school of Tartu. Subsequently, he worked as a clerk in a small retail businesses in Rakke Parish. After 1907, he worked as a literary critic, journalist and columnist in various newspapers. Between 1917 and 1920, he was politically active, acting as deputy mayor of Viljandi and working at the Secretariat of the Estonian Constituent Assembly. Thereafter, his political involvement waned. From 1920 to 1924 Raudsepp was a literary critic for the newspaper Vaba Maa. In 1924, he contracted tuberculosis which took a year of recovery. He became a freelance writer in Elva, and in Tartu from 1936. After the end of World War II Raudsepp lived in Tallinn. While writing he became one of the leading writers of comedies and dramas in Estonia.

In 1950 Raudsepp became a "nonperson" and was deported in 1951 after being arrested by the Soviet occupation regime. He was sentenced to ten years of exile in Siberia with hard labor. In September 1952 he died there during construction of the Baikal-Amur Mainline.

== Literary work ==
Hugo Raudsepp debuted after the First World War, with his anthology of short stories Sidemed ja sõlmed (Neck ties and knots) published in 1919. However he was especially known for his twenty plays in Estonia, which were among the most popular of his time. He often wrote under his pseudonym Milli Mallikas. Raudsepp's stage work began with Demobiliseeritud perekonnaisa (Demobilized Father) in 1923. The plays are mostly comedies, cryptically addressing the political issues of the day with satire. His breakthrough on the stage came with the piece Mikumärdi in 1929, a social parody that relentlessly exposed the ambitions and hollow self-esteem through the character of farmer Mikumärdi, the romantically adventurous female summer guests and a salesman from the city. It also achieved success in Finland and in Latvia. The subsequent drama Vedelvorst (The Idler) (1932) became a blockbuster. Hugo Raudsepp published his only novel Viimne eurooplane in 1941.

== Works ==
- Sidemed ja sõlmed (short stories, 1919)
- Imbi (novel, 1920)
- Kirju rida (short stories, 1921)
- Vested (I-II, 1921 and 1924)
- Euroopa uuemast kirjandusest (Literature, 1921)
- Ekspressionism (Literature, 1922)
- Lääne-Euroopa sentimentalism ja haletundeline vool Eesti kirjanduses (Literature, 1923)
- Demobiliseeritud perekonnaisa (Drama, 1923)
- Ameerika Kristus (Drama, 1926)
- Kikerpilli linnapead (Drama, 1926)
- Ristteed (short story collection, 1926)
- Sinimandria (Drama, 1927)
- Kohtumõistja Simson (Drama, 1927)
- Siinai tähistel (Drama, 1928)
- Püha Miikaeli selja taga (Drama, 1928)
- Mikumärdi (Drama, 1929)
- Mait Metsanurk ja tema aeg (essay-monograph, 1929)
- Põrunud aru õnnistus (Drama, 1931)
- Vedelvorst (Drama, 1932)
- Salongis ja kongis (Drama, 1933)
- Isand Maikello sisustab oma raamatukappi (Drama, 1934)
- Roosad prillid (Drama, 1934)
- Jumala veskid (stories, 1936)
- Lipud tormis (Drama, 1937)
- Mees, kelle käes on trumbid (Drama, 1938)
- Roheline Tarabella (Drama, 1938)
- Mustahamba (Drama, 1939)
- Kompromiss (Drama, 1940)
- Viimne eurooplane (novel, 1941)
- Kivisse raiutud (short story collection, 1942)
- Rotid (Drama, 1946)
- Tagatipu Tiisenoosen (Drama, 1946)
- Minu esimesed kodud. Mälestused I (Memoirs, 1947)
- Tillereinu peremehed (Drama, 1948)
- Küpsuseksam (Drama, 1949)
- Lasteaed (Drama, 1949)
- Vaheliku vapustused (drama, posthumously in 2003)

== Citations and references ==
=== Cited sources ===
- Gabrielle H. Cody, Evert Sprinchorn. The Columbia encyclopedia of modern drama, Volume 1 (2007 ed.). Columbia University Press. ISBN 0-231-14422-9. - Total pages: 1721
- Cornelius Hasselblatt. Katastrophe und Depression in den dreißiger Jahren – George Orwell und Hugo Raudsepp (in German). Acta Baltica 33.
- Cornelius Hasselblatt. Geschichte der estnischen Literatur: von den Anfängen bis zur Gegenwart (in German) (when ed.). Walter de Gruyter. ISBN 3-11-018025-1. - Total pages: 869
- Kevin O'Connor. Culture and customs of the Baltic states (2006 ed.). Greenwood Publishing Group. ISBN 0-313-33125-1. - Total pages: 274
- John Gassner, Edward Quinn. The Reader's Encyclopedia of World Drama (when ed.). Courier Dover Publications. ISBN 0-486-42064-7. - Total pages: 1040
- Toivo U. Raun. Estonia and the Estonians (when ed.). Hoover Press. ISBN 0-8179-2852-9. - Total pages: 366
- Joseph T. Shipley. Encyclopedia of Literature -, Volume 1 (2007 ed.). Read Books. ISBN 1-4067-0135-1. - Total pages: 588
