= Aleksei Tammiste =

Estonian basketball player

Personal information
- Born: July 29, 1946 (age 79) Türi, then part of Estonian SSR, Soviet Union
- Listed height: 186 cm (6 ft 1 in)

Career information
- Playing career: 1963–1984
- Position: guard

Career history
- 1963–1965: Tartu EMT
- 1965–1968: Kalev
- 1968–1977: TRÜ
- 1977–1984: Harju KEK

Aleksei Tammiste
Medal record

Men's basketball

Representing Soviet Union

EuroBasket
Gold medal – first place	West Germany 1971	USSR

Aleksei Tammiste (born July 29, 1946) is a retired Estonian professional basketball player, who competed for the Soviet Union. He won a gold medal at the 1971 EuroBasket Championship held in West Germany. During his career Tammiste won 10 Estonian league titles, the most domestic titles won by and Estonian basketball player. Elected to the Hall of fame of Estonian basketball in 2010.

== Achievements ==
=== National team ===
- European Championship: 1971

=== Club ===
- Estonian SSR Championship: 1967, 1968, 1969, 1970, 1972, 1973, 1975, 1976, 1977, 1979
