= Augenijus Vaškys =

Lithuanian basketball player

Personal information
- Born: Lithuanian SSR, Soviet Union
- Listed height: 6 ft 6 in (1.98 m)
- Listed weight: 190 lb (86 kg)

Career information
- Playing career: 1993–2011
- Position: Point guard Shooting guard

Career history

Playing
- 1993–1998: Olimpas Plungė
- 1998–1999: Bnei Herzliya
- 1998–2000: Astoria Bydgoszcz
- 2000–2001: Pogon Ruda Slaska
- 2001–2003: Czarni Slupsk
- 2003–2005: Tartu Ülikool/Rock
- 2005–2006: BC Siauliai
- 2006–2007: Namika Lahti
- 2008: Fausto-Tartu Kalev BC
- 2009: Naglis-Adakris Palangos
- 2010–2011: BC Mažeikiai

Coaching
- 2009–2010: Valga/CKE Inkasso
- 2012–2018: BC Telšiai
- 2018-present: BC Mažeikiai

Career highlights
- KML Most Valuable Player (2004); All-KML First Team (2004); Estonian Champion (2004); Estonian Cup winner (2004)

Augenijus Vaškys is a retired Lithuanian professional basketball player. He has played professionally in Lithuania, Israel, Poland, Estonia and Finland. Vaskys' most successful seasons include playing in Poland in Czarni Slupsk as well in Estonia in Tartu Ülikool/Rock. Was the coach of the Estonian basketball team KK Valga.

== Honours ==
- Lithuanian League
  - Runner-up: 1996–97
  - Third place: 2005–06
- Estonian League: 2003–04
  - Runner-up: 2004–05
- Estonian Cup: 2004
- Finnish League
  - Runner-up: 2006–07
- Baltic League
  - Third place: 2005–06
