= 2007–08 FIBA EuroCup Group A =

Basketball tournament group stage

These are the Group A Results and Standings:

Key to colors
Top two places in each group advance to Quarter-finals
Eliminated

== Standings ==
	Team	Pld	W	L	PF	PA	Diff
1.	(Estonia) Tartu Ülikool/Rock	6	5	1	481	438	+43
2.	(Russia) CSK VSS Samara	6	5	1	459	426	+33
3.	(Finland) Lappeenrannan	6	1	5	483	506	-23
4.	(Greece) PAOK BC	6	1	5	418	471	-53

== Results/Fixtures ==
All times given below are in Central European Time.

=== Game 1 ===
December 11, 2007

December 11
19:00

CSK VSS Samara (Russia)	94–82	(Finland) Lappeenrannan
Scoring by quarter: 22-27, 24-24, 22-19, 26-12

Samara

December 11
20:30

PAOK BC (Greece)	58–69	(Estonia) Tartu Ülikool/Rock
Scoring by quarter: 13-16, 9-15, 10-25, 26-13

Thessaloniki

=== Game 2 ===
December 17–18, 2007

December 17
18:30

Lappeenrannan (Finland)	83–74	(Greece) PAOK BC
Scoring by quarter: 25-24, 27-7, 15-25, 16-18

Lappeenranta

December 18
20:30

Tartu Ülikool/Rock (Estonia)	77–57	(Russia) CSK VSS Samara
Scoring by quarter: 25-13, 17-19, 22-11, 13-14

Tartu

=== Game 3 ===
January 7–8, 2008

January 7
18:30

Lappeenrannan (Finland)	94–102	(Estonia) Tartu Ülikool/Rock
Scoring by quarter: 16-25, 30-25, 19-30, 29-22

Lappeenranta

January 8
20:30

PAOK BC (Greece)	65–73; OT (OT)	(Russia) CSK VSS Samara
Scoring by quarter: 10-11, 19-18, 22-14, 12-20, Overtime: 2-10

Thessaloniki

=== Game 4 ===
January 15, 2008

January 15
18:30

Lappeenrannan (Finland)	76–78	(Russia) CSK VSS Samara
Scoring by quarter: 21-14, 17-24, 22-21, 16-19

Lappeenranta

January 15
19:00

Tartu Ülikool/Rock (Estonia)	90–80	(Greece) PAOK BC
Scoring by quarter: 29-13, 27-20, 15-28, 19-19

Tartu

=== Game 5 ===
January 22, 2008

January 22
19:00

CSK VSS Samara (Russia)	77–65	(Estonia) Tartu Ülikool/Rock
Scoring by quarter: 25-18, 26-25, 10-10, 16-12

Samara

January 22
20:30

PAOK BC (Greece)	80–76	(Finland) Lappeenrannan
Scoring by quarter: 23-32, 23-17, 23-13, 11-14

Thessaloniki

=== Game 6 ===
January 29, 2008

January 29
19:00

CSK VSS Samara (Russia)	80–61	(Greece) PAOK BC
Scoring by quarter: 17-16, 24-14, 20-16, 19-15

Samara

January 29
19:00

Tartu Ülikool/Rock (Estonia)	78–72	(Finland) Lappeenrannan
Scoring by quarter: 13-22, 22-19, 27-14, 16-17

Tartu
