= Indrek Varblane =

Estonian basketball player

Indrek Varblane (born 5 May 1968) is an Estonian basketball player.

He was born in Tallinn. He has studied at Estonian Sports Gymnasium (TSIK).

He began his basketball career at the age of 15, coached by Pearn Pressraud. Later his coaches were Üllar Kerde and Jaanus Levkoi. He has played in the clubs Asto-Basket, BC Tallinn, Baltika, BC Nybit and Pirita BM. He has been a member of Estonia men's national basketball team.
