= Vaimastvere =

Village in Estonia

Coordinates: 58°49′N 26°17′E

- Village
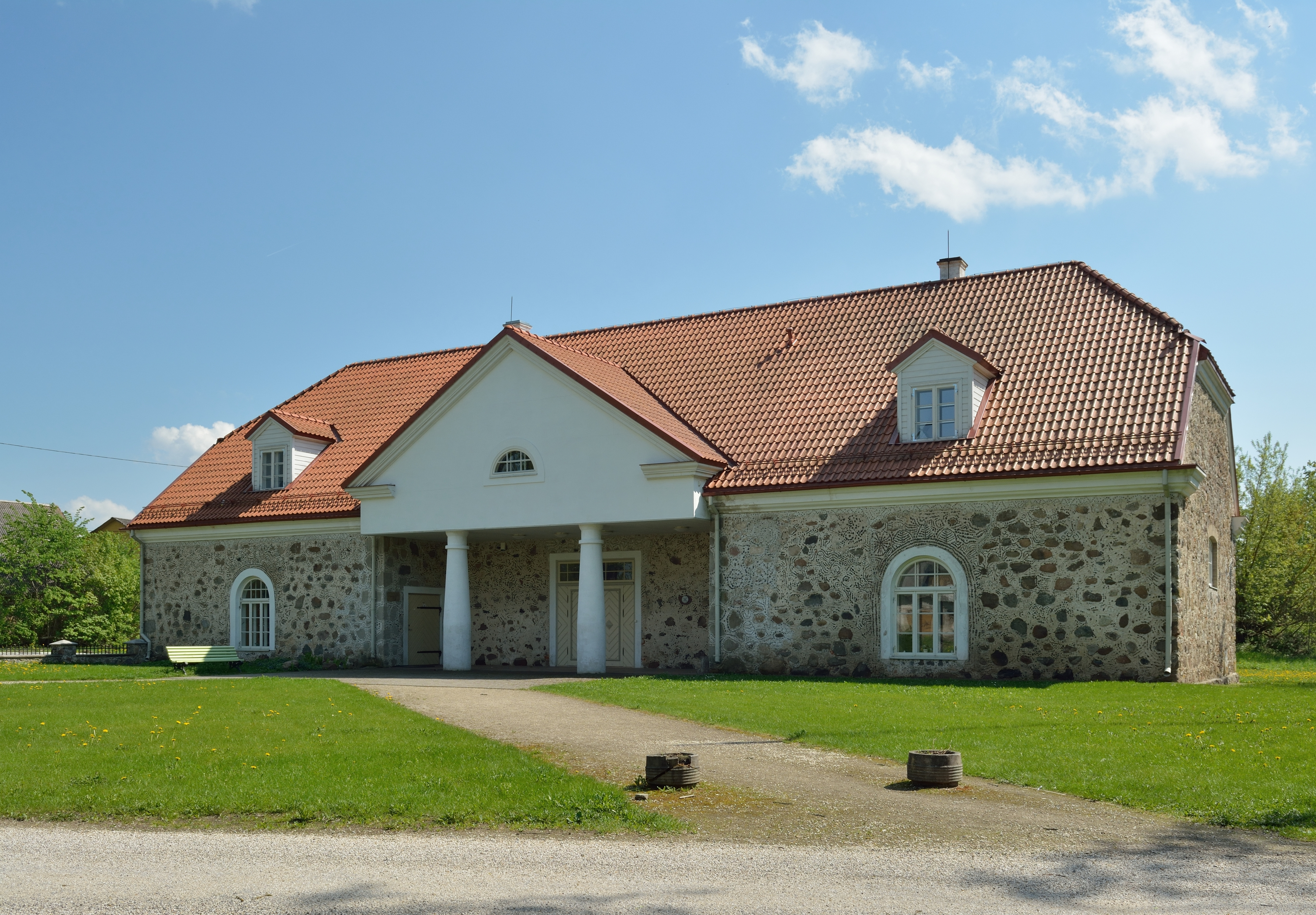
- Vaimastvere manor outbuilding
- Interactive map of Vaimastvere
- Country: Estonia
- County: Jõgeva County
- Parish: Jõgeva Parish
- Time zone: UTC+2 (EET)
  - Summer (DST): UTC+3 (EEST)

Vaimastvere (German: Waimastfer) is a village in Jõgeva Parish, Jõgeva County in eastern Estonia.

== Details ==
Playwright Hugo Raudsepp (1883–1952) and basketball player Aleksander Illi (1912–2000) were born in Vaimastvere.

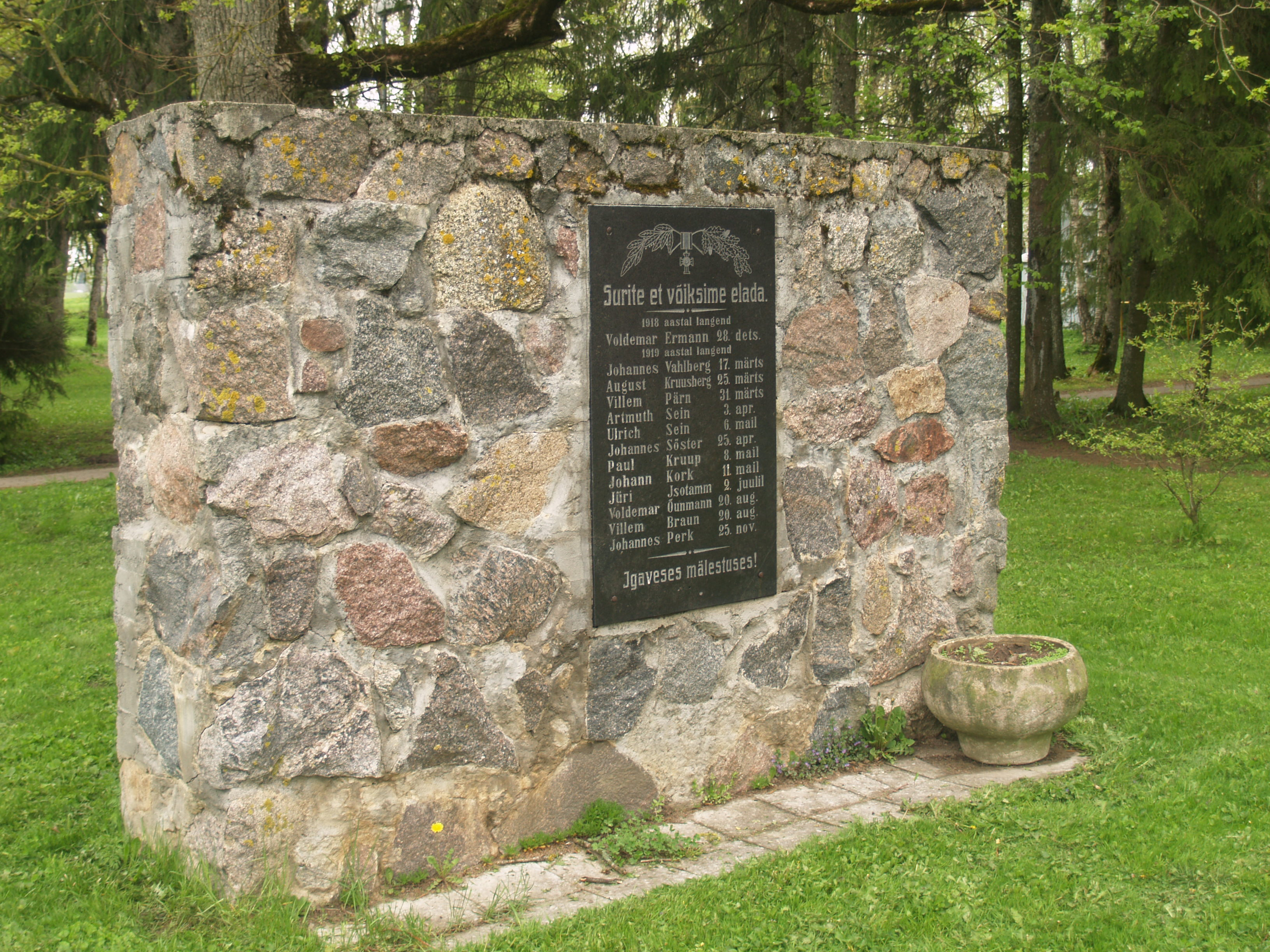
Memorial to local men killed while serving in the Estonian Land Forces during the Estonian War of Independence
