= 1925 KML season =

1925 Estonian national championships in basketball

Korvpalli Meistriliiga
- Season: 1925
- Duration: 15 March 1925 – 28 March 1925
- Games played: 3
- Teams: 3

Finals
- Champions: Tallinna Sport; 1st title
- Runners-up: Tallinna Kalev
- Third place: Tallinna NMKÜ

1925 Korvpalli Meistriliiga was the inaugural season of the Estonian basketball league.

The season started on 15 March 1925 and concluded on 28 March 1925 with Tallinna Sport winning their 1st Estonian League title.

== Teams ==
Team	Location	Arena	Capacity
Tallinna Kalev	Tallinn	Harjuoru gym	
Tallinna NMKÜ	Tallinn	Harjuoru gym	
Tallinna Sport	Tallinn	Harjuoru gym	

== Fixtures and results ==
15 March 1925

Tallinna Kalev	31–9	Tallinna NMKÜ

Harjuoru gym, Tallinn

22 March 1925

Tallinna Sport	22–13	Tallinna Kalev

Harjuoru gym, Tallinn

28 March 1925

Tallinna Sport	16–35	Tallinna NMKÜ

Harjuoru gym, Tallinn
