= Siim-Sander Vene =

Estonian basketball player (born 1990)

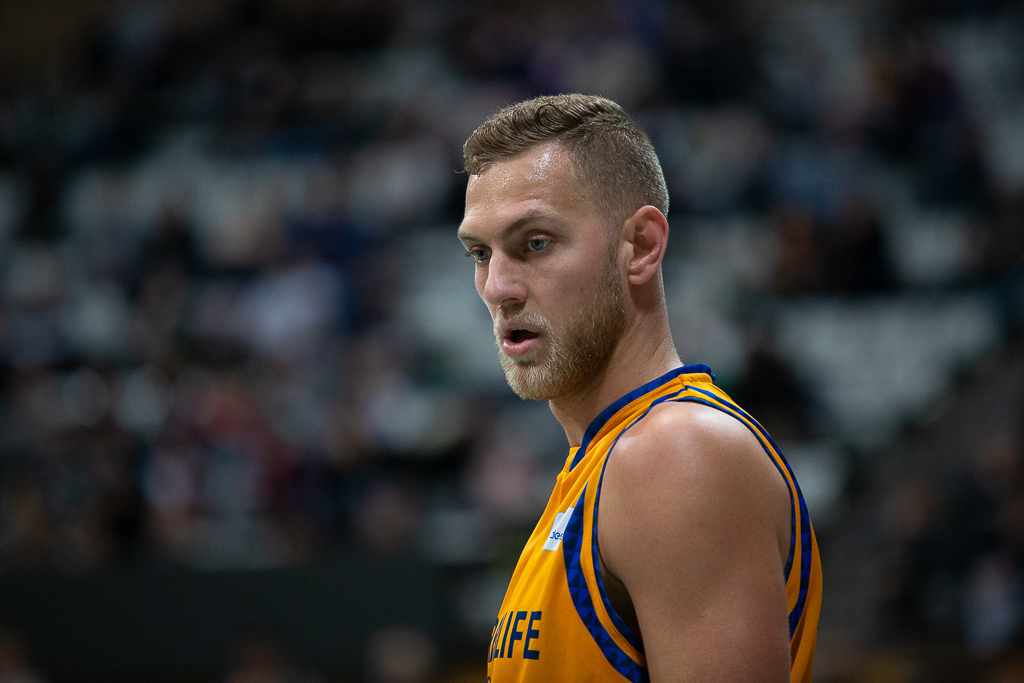
- Vene with Gran Canaria in 2019

Free agent
- Position: Small forward / power forward

Personal information
- Born: 12 November 1990 (age 36) Tartu, Estonia, Soviet Union
- Listed height: 2.03 m (6 ft 8 in)
- Listed weight: 97 kg (214 lb)

Career information
- NBA draft: 2012: undrafted
- Playing career: 2005–present

Career history
- 2005–2006: TTÜ
- 2006–2016: Žalgiris
- 2006–2008: →Žalgiris-Arvydas Sabonis school
- 2008–2009: →Kaunas Triobet
- 2010: →KK Kaunas
- 2010–2011: →Ludwigsburg
- 2011–2012: →BC Baltai Kaunas
- 2012: →VEF Rīga
- 2012–2013: →BC Prienai
- 2016–2017: Nizhny Novgorod
- 2017: Reggiana
- 2018: Varese
- 2018: Manresa
- 2018: Fuenlabrada
- 2018–2019: Gran Canaria
- 2019–2020: Varese
- 2020–2021: Fuenlabrada
- 2021–2022: Limoges CSP
- 2022: Varese
- 2022–2023: Hapoel Jerusalem
- 2023–2024: San Pablo Burgos
- 2024–2025: Stal Ostrów Wielkopolski
- 2025–2026: Šiauliai

Career highlights
- 3× Lithuanian League champion (2014–2016); 2× Lithuanian Cup winner (2013, 2015); Latvian League champion (2012); Baltic League champion (2010); NKL champion (2008); NIJT champion (2007); 3× Estonian Player of the Year (2017–2019)

Siim-Sander Vene (born 12 November 1990) is an Estonian professional basketball player who last played for Šiauliai of the Lietuvos krepšinio lyga (LKL). Standing at 2.03 m (6 ft 8 in), he plays both the small forward and power forward positions. Vene represents the Estonian national basketball team internationally, and was named Estonian Basketball Player of the Year in 2017, 2018 and 2019.

== Professional career ==
Vene began playing basketball with Siili Palliklubi and TTÜ. In 2006, Vene moved to Lithuania and joined Žalgiris' junior team Žalgiris-Arvydas Sabonis school. With Žalgiris, Vene won the Nike International Junior Tournament in 2007 and the Nacionalinė krepšinio lyga (NKL) in 2008. Vene was loaned to Kaunas Triobet of the Lietuvos krepšinio lyga (LKL) for the 2008–09 season.

In the 2009–10 Euroleague, Vene averaged 2 points, 1.8 rebounds and 0.2 assists per game.

In October 2010, Vene was loaned to Kaunas, and in December 2010, to Ludwigsburg of the Basketball Bundesliga (BBL).

In 2011, Vene joined Baltai (former Kaunas) on loan from Žalgiris. In February 2012, he was loaned to VEF Rīga of the Latvijas Basketbola Līga (LBL).

On 27 September 2012, Vene was loaned to Prienai. Prienai finished the 2012–13 season in fourth place.

In July 2013, Vene returned to Žalgiris. In the 2013–14 Euroleague, Vene averaged 3 points, 2.6 rebounds and 0.6 assists per game, as Žalgiris reached Top 16. Vene won his first Lithuanian Championship in the 2013–14 season, after defeating Neptūnas 4 games to 2 in the finals. In the 2014–15 season, Vene averaged 3.4 points, 1.2 rebounds and 0.5 assists per game in the Euroleague and won his second Lithuanian Championship, after Žalgiris defeated league rivals Lietuvos rytas 4–0 in the finals. In the 2015–16 Euroleague, Žalgiris once again reached Top 16, but failed to advance to the playoffs with a 2–12 record. Vene averaged 3.3 points, 1.6 rebounds and 0.7 assists per game. He won his third consecutive Lithuanian Championship in the 2015–16 season, after Žalgiris defeated Neptūnas in the finals.

On 8 August 2016, Vene signed with Nizhny Novgorod of the VTB United League. He was named Estonian Basketball Player of the Year in 2017.

On 16 August 2017, Vene signed with Reggiana of the Lega Basket Serie A (LBA). On 29 September, he was sidelined for three months due to a leg injury and didn't play any games for Reggiana. On 4 January 2018, it was announced that Vene will sign for LBA club Varese for the remainder of the 2017–18 season. On 21 June 2018, he was named Estonian Basketball Player of the Year for the second consecutive year.

On 5 September 2018, Vene signed a six-week deal with Manresa of the Liga ACB as a replacement for the injured Justin Doellman. He was released from the team when his contract ended. He signed with another Liga ACB team Fuenlabrada in December 2018. Only a week later Vene moved to another Liga ACB team Gran Canaria after making use of his opt-out for signing with a EuroLeague team.

On 1 July 2019 he signed contract with Varese of the LBA. He returns to Varese after a season with three different Spanish teams. On 24 May 2020 Vene signed a contract with Fuenlabrada, making a return to the Spanish club where he had already a stint in 2018.

On 28 September 2021, he signed a 2-month contract with Limoges CSP of the LNB Pro A.

On 4 January 2022, he signed with Pallacanestro Varese of the Italian Lega Basket Serie A (LBA).

On 9 August 2022, he signed with Hapoel Jerusalem of the Israeli Premier League. While on the team, Vene played a significant role particularly in a number of clutch wins, including over Maccabi Tel Aviv, and over Lenovo Tenerife in the semi-finals of the Basketball Champions League Final Four.

On 22 August 2025, he signed with Šiauliai of the Lithuanian Basketball League (LKL).

On 17 August 2026, Vene signed a training-deal with Derthona Basket of the Lega Basket Serie A.

== National team career ==
Vene was a member of the Estonian national under-18 basketball team that competed at the 2007 FIBA Europe Under-18 Championship and finished the tournament in 12th place. Vene averaged 12.1 points, 5 rebounds and 1 assist per game.

As a member of the senior Estonian national team, Vene competed at the EuroBasket 2015, averaging 10 points, 6.4 rebounds and 1.6 assists per game. Estonia finished the tournament in 20th place.

Vene was named the captain of the Estonian national team in 2020 ahead of the EuroBasket 2021 qualification games.

== Personal life ==
Vene's father, Priit, and mother, Lea, were both basketballers. His father is now a basketball coach. Vene's younger brother, Kent-Kaarel, is also a professional basketball player.

== Career statistics ==
Legend
GP	Games played	GS	Games started	MPG	Minutes per game
FG%	Field-goal percentage	3P%	3-point field-goal percentage	FT%	Free-throw percentage
RPG	Rebounds per game	APG	Assists per game	SPG	Steals per game
BPG	Blocks per game	PPG	Points per game	PIR	Performance index rating
**Bold**	Career high

=== EuroLeague ===
Year	Team	GP	GS	MPG	FG%	3P%	FT%	RPG	APG	SPG	BPG	PPG	PIR
2009–10	Žalgiris	6	0	10.9	.417	.000	.500	1.8	.2	.0	**.2**	2.0	1.2
2013–14	Žalgiris	5	0	13.7	.462	**.500**	**1.000**	**2.6**	.6	.2	**.2**	3.0	3.8
2014–15	Žalgiris	14	0	9.2	.450	.438	.714	1.2	.5	**.5**	.0	3.4	2.6
2015–16	Žalgiris	**20**	1	12.1	**.491**	.300	.833	1.6	**.7**	.4	**.2**	3.3	3.1
2018–19	Gran Canaria	18	**4**	**15.0**	.478	.389	.842	1.2	.6	**.5**	.0	**6.8**	**5.1**
Career		63	5	11.2	.471	.357	.789	1.5	.6	.4	.1	4.2	2.8

=== Domestic leagues ===
Season	Team	League	GP	MPG	FG%	3P%	FT%	RPG	APG	SPG	BPG	PPG
2007–08	Žalgiris-2	(Lithuania) LKL	2	19.2	.300	.167	.000	4.5	2.0	.0	.0	3.5
2008–09	Kaunas Triobet	(Lithuania) LKL	19	19.0	.400	.326	1.000	3.3	.4	.8	.3	5.2
2009–10	Žalgiris	(Lithuania) LKL	12	13.5	.441	.308	.625	3.0	.8	.7	.3	3.3
2010–11	Kaunas	(Lithuania) LKL	9	29.3	.490	.472	.714	4.2	1.3	1.6	.4	13.4
2010–11	EnBW Ludwigsburg	(Germany) BBL	19	15.6	.378	.346	.800	1.1	.6	.4	.2	4.5
2011–12	Baltai	(Lithuania) LKL	15	26.1	.362	.328	.600	3.4	1.5	1.3	.2	8.0
2011–12	VEF Rīga	(Latvia) LBL	5	21.8	.394	.385	.500	4.6	1.2	.6	.2	6.6
2012–13	Prienai	(Lithuania) LKL	26	28.2	.502	.243	.789	5.6	2.5	1.3	.7	11.8
2013–14	Žalgiris	(Lithuania) LKL	5	12.4	.400	.000	1.000	2.8	1.0	.4	.0	2.4
2014–15	Žalgiris	(Lithuania) LKL	46	14.6	.508	.333	.826	2.9	.9	.6	.3	5.4
2015–16	Žalgiris	(Lithuania) LKL	43	14.0	.514	.286	.788	2.9	.7	.5	.2	4.3
2016–17	Nizhny Novgorod	(Russia) VTB	24	24.2	.448	.337	.756	2.7	2.0	.5	.2	10.4
2017–18	Pallacanestro Varese	(Italy) LBA	20	24.9	.465	.393	.913	3.9	2.6	1.0	.2	8.3
2018–19	Manresa	(Spain) ACB	6	22.0	.467	.414	1.000	3.0	.8	.3	.2	10.0
2018–19	Fuenlabrada	(Spain) ACB	1	20.6	.571	.571	1.000	2.0	2.0	.0	.0	14.0
2018–19	Gran Canaria	(Spain) ACB	18	13.2	.344	.243	.333	1.3	.3	.2	.3	3.0
2019–20	Pallacanestro Varese	(Italy) LBA	19	25.5	.510	.422	.833	4.2	2.3	.6	.1	10.8
2020–21	Fuenlabrada	(Spain) ACB	12	21.2	.391	.286	.750	2.3	1.0	.6	.0	6.0
2021–22	Limoges CSP	(France) LNB	7	13.1	.417	.286	1.000	1.3	1.3	.3	.0	3.7
2021–22	Pallacanestro Varese	(Italy) LBA	18	28.2	.486	.383	.786	4.6	1.6	.7	.3	12.2

=== Estonia national team ===
Year	Tournament	National Team	GP	GS	MPG	FG%	3P%	FT%	RPG	APG	SPG	BPG	PPG
2005	2005 U-16 European Championship Division B	Estonia U-16	6	4	28.0	.448	.444	.583	5.2	.0	1.5	.2	13.8
2006	2006 U-16 European Championship Division B	Estonia U-16	9	9	34.3	.372	.328	.378	9.6	3.3	2.8	1.4	16.0
2007	2007 U-18 European Championship	Estonia U-18	8	2	26.5	.430	.333	.667	5.0	1.0	1.9	.8	12.1
2007	2007 U-20 European Championship Division B	Estonia U-20	8	0	13.3	.300	.050	.500	3.3	.3	.9	.0	3.8
2009	EuroBasket 2009 Qualification Relegation Round	Estonia	5	0	14.4	.400	.300	.500	2.2	.2	.4	.8	4.0
2011	EuroBasket 2011 Division B	Estonia	3	0	7.7	.250	.000	1.000	.0	.7	.3	.0	1.3
2012	EuroBasket 2013 Qualification	Estonia	10	1	25.9	.551	.370	.571	6.8	1.9	.7	.5	14.0
2013	EuroBasket 2015 First Qualification Round	Estonia	4	0	21.3	.290	.286	.833	3.3	1.5	1.0	1.5	6.3
2015	EuroBasket 2015	Estonia	5	2	23.2	.340	.100	.667	6.4	1.6	.6	.2	7.8
2018	2019 Basketball World Cup Qualification	Estonia	4	4	29.0	.490	.286	.750	3.2	2.2	2.8	.0	15.5
2020	EuroBasket 2022 qualification	Estonia	2	2	31.2	.542	.500	1.000	4.5	1.5	.5	.0	18.5
2021–22	2023 Basketball World Cup Qualification	Estonia	7		26.6	.262	.176	.857	4.1	2.3	.4	.1	7.4
2022	EuroBasket 2022	Estonia	5		21.1	.465	.400	.875	1.6	1.0	.6	.2	11.4

== Awards and accomplishments ==
=== Professional career ===
Žalgiris-Arvydas Sabonis school

- Nike International Junior Tournament champion: 2007
- Lithuanian 2nd division champion: 2008

Žalgiris

- 3× Lithuanian League champion: 2014, 2015, 2016
- Baltic Basketball League champion: 2010
- Lithuanian Cup champion: 2015

VEF Rīga

- Latvian League champion: 2012

Prienai

- Lithuanian Cup champion: 2013

=== Individual ===
- Estonian Basketball Player of the Year: 2017, 2018, 2019
