= 2007–08 FIBA EuroCup Group B =

Basketball tournament group stage

These are the Group B Results and Standings:

Key to colors
Top two places in each group advance to Quarter-finals
Eliminated

== Standings ==
	Team	Pld	W	L	PF	PA	Diff
1.	(Belgium) Mons-Hainaut	6	4	2	449	422	+27
2.	(Russia) Ural Great	6	4	2	461	429	+32
3.	(Ukraine) Cherkasky	6	3	3	465	507	-42
4.	(Turkey) Banvit	6	1	5	473	490	-17

== Results/Fixtures ==
All times given below are in Central European Time.

=== Game 1 ===
December 11, 2007

December 11
18:00

Banvit (Turkey)	78–81	(Belgium) Mons-Hainaut
Scoring by quarter: 18-26, 14-26, 28-22, 18-7

Balikesir

December 11
20:30

Cherkasky (Ukraine)	72–101	(Russia) Ural Great
Scoring by quarter: 11-24, 18-28, 18-31, 25-18

Cherkasy

=== Game 2 ===
December 18, 2007

December 18
19:30

Ural Great (Russia)	77–74	(Turkey) Banvit
Scoring by quarter: 19-19, 20-28, 21-14, 17-13

Ural

December 18
20:00

Mons-Hainaut (Belgium)	72–67	(Ukraine) Cherkasky
Scoring by quarter: 22-13, 21-19, 10-15, 19-20

Mons

=== Game 3 ===
January 8, 2008

January 8
20:30

Banvit (Turkey)	88–90	(Ukraine) Cherkasky
Scoring by quarter: 26-24, 15-27, 21-22, 26-17

Balikesir

January 9
20:30

Ural Great (Russia)	60–58	(Belgium) Mons-Hainaut
Scoring by quarter: 16-19, 13-12, 15-10, 16-17

Ural

=== Game 4 ===
January 15, 2008

January 15
19:30

Ural Great (Russia)	93–73	(Ukraine) Cherkasky
Scoring by quarter: 26-19, 21-21, 24-12, 22-21

Ural

January 15
20:00

Mons-Hainaut (Belgium)	85–81	(Turkey) Banvit
Scoring by quarter: 26-16, 21-17, 18-21, 20-27

Mons

=== Game 5 ===
January 22, 2008

January 22
18:00

Banvit (Turkey)	71–70	(Russia) Ural Great
Scoring by quarter: 23-14, 19-22, 11-22, 18-12

Balikesir

January 22
19:30

Cherkasky (Ukraine)	76–72	(Belgium) Mons-Hainaut
Scoring by quarter: 19-18, 14-15, 22-18, 21-21

Cherkasy

=== Game 6 ===
January 29, 2008

January 29
19:30

Cherkasky (Ukraine)	87–81	(Turkey) Banvit
Scoring by quarter: 26-18, 22-18, 21-24, 18-21

Cherkasy

January 29
20:00

Mons-Hainaut (Belgium)	81–60	(Russia) Ural Great
Scoring by quarter: 21-12, 21-14, 21-17, 18-17

Mons
