= KK Baltika =

Estonian basketball team

Baltika
- Founded: 1989; 36 years ago
- Dissolved: 1998
- History: Baltika (1989–1998)
- Arena: Kalev Sports Hall
- Location: Tallinn

KK Baltika was an Estonian professional basketball club founded in 1989 and dissolved in 1998. The club played in the Estonian Korvpalli Meistriliiga.

The team played its home games at Kalev Sports Hall.

== History ==
Founded in 1989, the team was named after its title sponsor Baltika Group and competed in the Estonian Korvpalli Meistriliiga. Baltika reached the league finals in the 1993–94 KML season and the 1996–97 KML season but failed to win the title. In 1997, the team won the Estonian Basketball Cup, after defeating Tartu in the finals. Baltika pulled out of the Korvpalli Meistriliiga after the 1997–98 KML season and dissolved.
