= Aleksander Illi =

Estonian basketball player

Personal information
- Born: 22 December 1912 Vaimastvere, Governorate of Livonia
- Died: 25 January 2000 (aged 87) Saue, Estonia

Aleksander Illi (22 December 1912 – 25 January 2000) was an Estonian basketball player. He competed in the 1936 Summer Olympics.
