= 2007–08 FIBA EuroCup Group C =

European basketball results

These are the Group C Results and Standings:

Key to colors
Top two places in each group advance to Quarter-finals
Eliminated

== Standings ==
	Team	Pld	W	L	PF	PA	Diff
1.	(Cyprus) AEL Limassol	6	4	2	494	455	+39
2.	(Croatia) KK Zagreb	6	4	2	460	461	-1
3.	(Greece) Olympia Larissa	6	3	3	400	416	-16
4.	(Russia) Spartak	6	1	5	436	458	-22

== Results/Fixtures ==
All times given below are in Central European Time.

=== Game 1 ===
December 11, 2007

December 11
18:00

KK Zagreb (Croatia)	80–76	(Russia) Spartak
Scoring by quarter: 15-15, 20-23, 21-22, 24-16

Zagreb

December 11
20:00

Olympia Larissa (Greece)	74–70	(Cyprus) AEL Limassol
Scoring by quarter: 10-16, 25-20, 25-10, 14-24

Larissa

=== Game 2 ===
December 18–19, 2007

December 18
19:30

Spartak (Russia)	66–75	(Greece) Olympia Larissa
Scoring by quarter: 22-18, 17-14, 16-18, 11-25

St.Petersburg

December 19
19:30

AEL Limassol (Cyprus)	103–80	(Croatia) KK Zagreb
Scoring by quarter: 30-22, 22-24, 25-20, 26-14

Limassol

=== Game 3 ===
January 8, 2008

January 8
18:00

KK Zagreb (Croatia)	82–77	(Cyprus) AEL Limassol
Scoring by quarter: 19-14, 22-18, 27-16, 14-29

Zagreb

January 8
20:00

Olympia Larissa (Greece)	58–63	(Russia) Spartak
Scoring by quarter: 14-15, 25-18, 13-14, 6-16

Larissa

=== Game 4 ===
January 15, 2008

January 15
19:30

Spartak (Russia)	83–92	(Croatia) KK Zagreb
Scoring by quarter: 23-20, 21-16, 15-21, 24-35

St.Petersburg

January 15
19:45

AEL Limassol (Cyprus)	91–71	(Greece) Olympia Larissa
Scoring by quarter: 27-23, 18-13, 24-17, 22-18

Limassol

=== Game 5 ===
January 22, 2008

January 22
19:30

Spartak (Russia)	77–81	(Cyprus) AEL Limassol
Scoring by quarter: 22-20, 25-15, 16-18, 14-28

St.Petersburg

January 22
20:00

Olympia Larissa (Greece)	64–63	(Croatia) KK Zagreb
Scoring by quarter: 19-15, 22-18, 12-13, 11-17

Larissa

=== Game 6 ===
January 29, 2008

January 29
18:00

KK Zagreb (Croatia)	63–58	(Greece) Olympia Larissa
Scoring by quarter: 19-18, 13-11, 22-18, 9-11

Zagreb

January 29
19:45

AEL Limassol (Cyprus)	72–71	(Russia) Spartak
Scoring by quarter: 19-30, 14-18, 24-9, 15-14

Limassol
