= Edgar Naarits =

Estonian basketball coach

Edgar Naarits (22 July 1920 – 4 May 2004) is an Estonian basketball coach and sport pedagogue.

He was born in Tartu. 1943–1944 he graduated from a sport school in Moscow.

In 1937 he founded Tartu Kalev basketball team.

During World War II, he was mobilized into Red Army. He got injured.

1945–1970 he taught at Tartu State University's Institute of Physical Education. 1976–1995 he was the headmaster of Tartu Basketball School. He has coached many basketball clubs and national teams (1946–1956 Estonia men's national basketball team, 1947–1976 Estonia women's national basketball team).

Awards:

- 1957: Merited Coach of Soviet Union
- 1999: Order of the White Star, IV class
- 2002: (Estonian: riiklik spordi elutööpreemia)
- 2020: chosen to the Hall of Fame of Estonian Basketball
