= University of Tartu men's basketball team =

Estonian basketball club

Tartu Ülikool Maks & Moorits
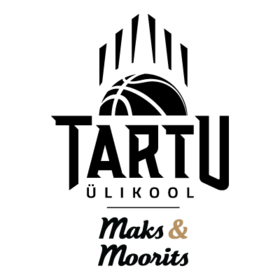
- Leagues: KML; EstLatBL; Europe Cup
- Founded: 1937; 89 years ago
- History: List: Tartu EASK (1937–1940); Tartu ÜSK (1948–1953); TRÜ (1954–1989); Tartu Ülikool (1989–present)
- Arena: University of Tartu Sports Hall
- Capacity: 2,600
- Location: Tartu, Estonia
- Team colors: White, Black
- Team manager: Mailis Pokk
- Head coach: Aivar Kuusmaa
- Team captain: Martin Paasoja
- Championships: 1 Soviet Championship; 27 Estonian Championships; 18 Estonian Cups; 1 BBL Cup
- Website: basket.ut.ee
Home	Away

Tartu Ülikooli korvpallimeeskond (English: University of Tartu men's basketball team), also known as Tartu Ülikool Maks & Moorits for sponsorship reasons, is a professional basketball team based in Tartu, Estonia. They are a part of the University of Tartu Academic Sports Club. The team plays in the Estonian-Latvian Basketball League and the Korvpalli Meistriliiga (KML). Their home arena is the University of Tartu Sports Hall.

University of Tartu teams have won a record 27 Estonian League championships, a record 18 Estonian Cup titles and one Soviet Union League championship.

== History ==
Founded in 1937 as Tartu Eesti Akadeemiline Spordiklubi (Tartu Estonian Academic Sports Club), the team won the regional tournament and were promoted to the Estonian Championship. Coached by player-coach Aleksander Illi and led by Ralf Viksten, the team won the championship in 1938. Tartu EASK won two more titles in 1939 and 1940, led by player-coach Oskar Erikson and top scorer Heino Veskila. The team's success was cut short by World War II and the Soviet occupation.

The university team returned to the Estonian Championship in 1948. On 28 August 1948, they beat Tartu Dünamo by a record score of 132–6, with Ilmar Kullam scoring 40 points. Led by player-coach Edgar Naarits, the team won five consecutive Estonian League titles from 1948 to 1952. They also won the Soviet Union League in 1949. Ernst Ehaveer took over as the head coach ahead of the 1956 season, and guided the team to another Estonian championship that same year. Jaak Lipso joined the team prior to the 1957 season and led them to two more championships in 1958 and 1959. The team began to struggle after Lipso left in 1960. They returned to dominance in the late 1960s, this time led by Aleksei Tammiste. The team won eight Estonian championships between 1969 and 1978. Soon after, the team entered into a period of decline.

The team continued to struggle after the restoration of Estonia's independence. In the 1990s, Tartu was represented in the league by Korvpalliklubi Tartu (Basketball Club Tartu). They reached the finals in 1996 but were swept in three games by BC Kalev. The team made their debut in a European competition by competing in the 1999–2000 season of the Saporta Cup, but failed to advance past the preliminary round.

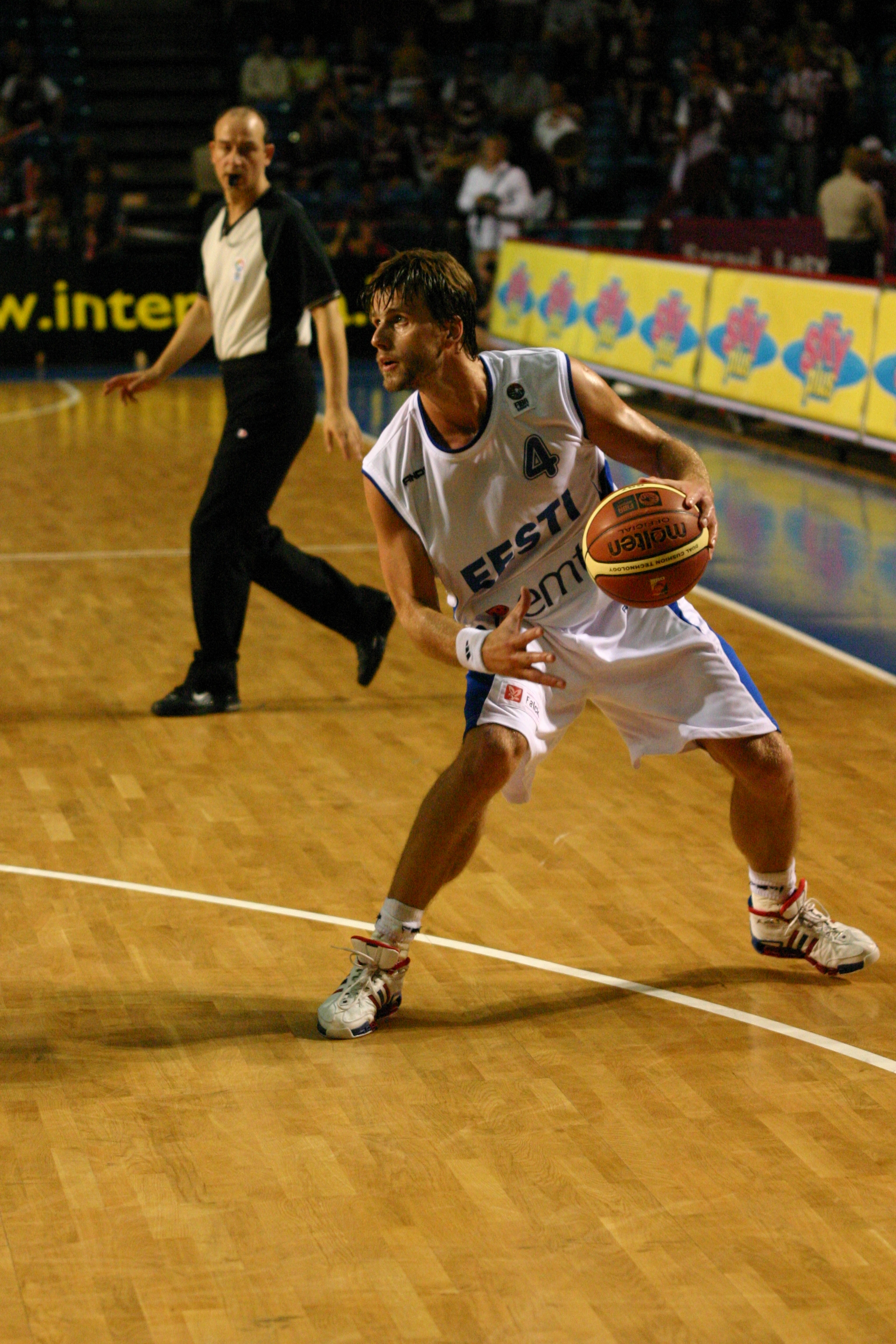
Tanel Tein led Tartu to five league championships between 2000 and 2010.

In March 2000, they were taken over by the University of Tartu Sports Club, ushering in a new era for the team. The team now known as Tartu Ülikool-Delta won the Estonian Cup in 2000, beating Nybit in the finals. In the 2000 league playoffs, they defeated BC Jüri Basket and Nybit en route to facing Tallinna Kalev in the finals. Tartu Ülikool-Delta won the series 3–0, ending a 22-year championship drought for the city. In July 2000, Jüri Neissaar was hired as head coach, replacing Teet Laur. Tartu Ülikool-Delta successfully defended both titles in 2001. The team swept Tallinna Ülikoolid-A. Le Coq in three games in the league finals. Point guard and team leader Tanel Tein won his first Most Valuable Player Award at the end of the season.

From 2001 to 2016, Tartu Ülikool was sponsored by Saku's Rock beer brand and Rock was frequently used to refer to the team. They were unable to defend their league title, losing to Tallinna Kalev in the finals in 2002. Despite that, Tein was named the league's Most Valuable Player for the second season in a row. In the 2002–03 season, TÜ/Rock won the Estonian Cup but finished third in the league. After the season, Neissaar was replaced by assistant Tõnu Lust. Led by Augenijus Vaškys, the team won the KML championship in the 2003–04 season by defeating EBS/Nybit, four games to two in the finals. Vaškys was named the KML Most Valuable Player. TÜ/Rock won another Estonian Cup in the 2004–05 season. They also made their debut in the Baltic Basketball League (BBL). After the 2005–06 season, Tein was named the league MVP for the third time. In July 2006, TÜ/Rock hired Algirdas Brazys as head coach, with predecessors Paavo Russak and Tõnu Lust continuing as assistant coaches. In the 2007 KML Finals, TÜ/Rock, led by Tein, Martin Müürsepp and Gert Kullamäe, faced off against BC Kalev/Cramo, to whom they had lost in the two previous finals. TÜ/Rock went on to win the series 4–2. Tein was named the KML Finals MVP.

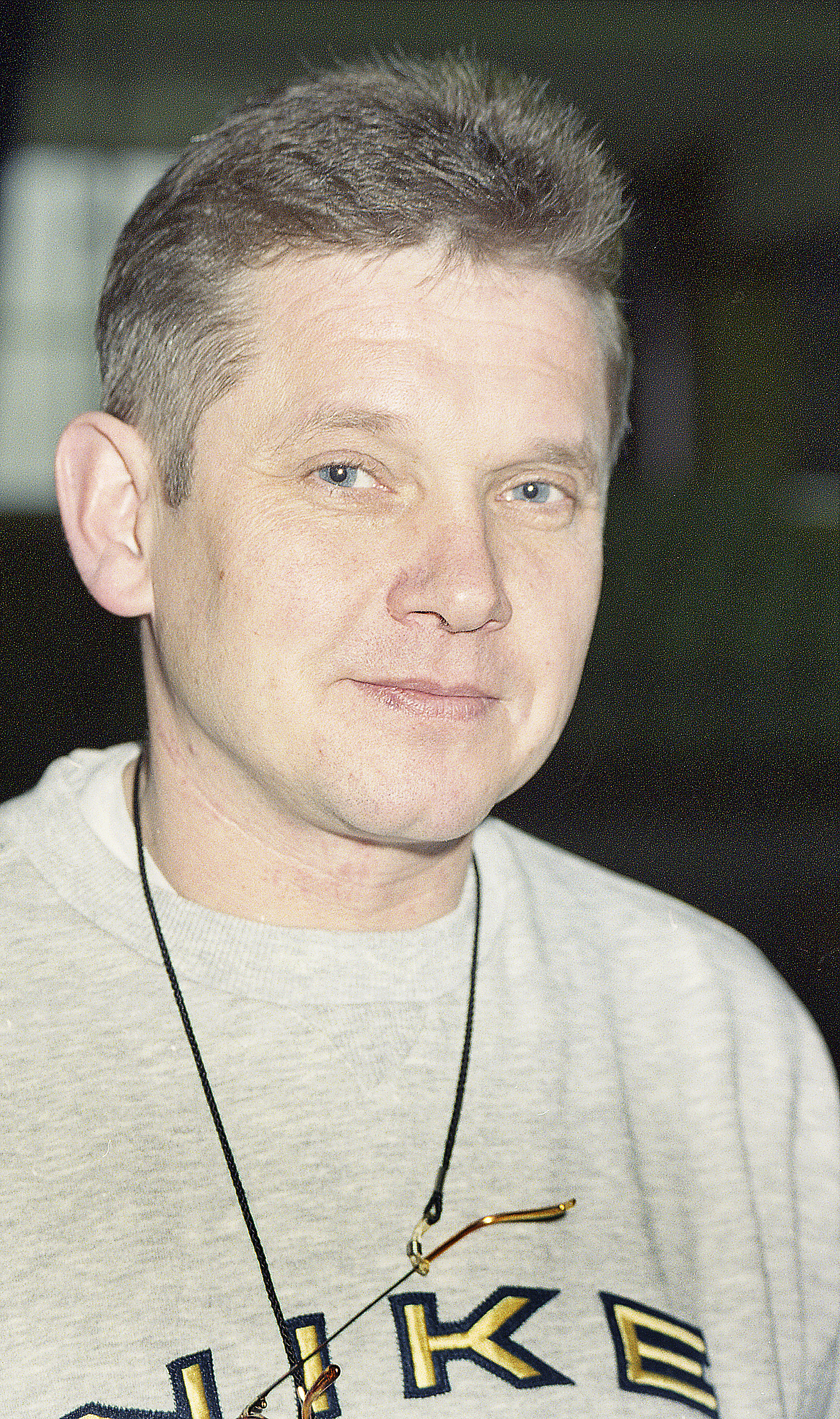
Üllar Kerde guided the team to the EuroCup Final Four in 2008.

In June 2007, Üllar Kerde was hired as the new head coach. Under Kerde, the team reached the Final Four of the EuroCup in 2008. However, they lost to eventual champions Barons LMT 88–82 in the semifinal and to Proteas EKA AEL 79–70 in the third place game. TÜ/Rock successfully defended their KML title by defeating BC Kalev/Cramo in a four-game sweep in the finals. Brian Cusworth was named both the Finals MVP and the league MVP. After a poor start in both the Baltic Basketball League and the EuroChallenge, Kerde was relieved of his duties on 19 December 2008 and replaced by assistant Indrek Visnapuu. Under Visnapuu's leadership, TÜ/Rock reached the Baltic Basketball League Final Four for the first time in team history, beating rivals BC Kalev/Cramo 71–68 in overtime and winning the series 2–1. They lost to Žalgiris 83–74 in the semifinal, but beat ASK Riga 77–68 in the third place game. TÜ/Rock were unable to defend their KML title in 2009, losing to BC Kalev/Cramo in the finals. The team, however, won both the Estonian Cup and the KML championship in the 2009–10 season. They won their 25th Estonian championship by beating BC Rakvere Tarvas 4–2 in the KML Finals. Janar Talts was named the Finals MVP. The team added two more Estonian Cups in 2010 and 2011. On 24 January 2012, Visnapuu resigned and was replaced by his assistant and former Tartu Ülikool guard Gert Kullamäe. The team won two more Estonian Cups in 2013 and 2014. In 2015, TÜ/Rock once again faced BC Kalev/Cramo in the KML Finals, winning the series 4–1. Tanel Kurbas won the Finals MVP award. They finished runner-up to Šiauliai in the Baltic Basketball League in 2016.

In 2018, the Estonian-Latvian Basketball League was formed. Tartu Ülikool reached the playoffs in the league's inaugural season, where they lost to BC Kalev/Cramo in the quarterfinals. On 19 December 2021, Tartu Ülikool Maks & Moorits defeated BC Kalev/Cramo 82–73 in the Estonian Cup final to win their first trophy in seven years. The team finished the 2022–23 Estonian-Latvian Basketball League season in third place. They lost to BC Prometey 89–67 in the semifinal but beat BC Kalev/Cramo 63–60 in the third place game.

== Sponsorship naming ==
- Raidor: 1992–1994
- Tartu Gaas: 1994–1995
- SK Polaris: 1997–1999
- Tartu Ülikool-Delta: 1999–2001
- Tartu Ülikool/Rock: 2001–2011, 2012–2016
- Tartu Ülikool Maks & Moorits: 2020–present

== Logos ==
Rock sponsorship logo
(until 2016)

Non-commercial logo
(2016–2018)

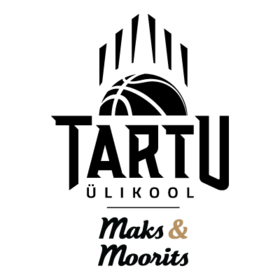
Maks & Moorits sponsorship logo
(2020–present)

== Home arenas ==
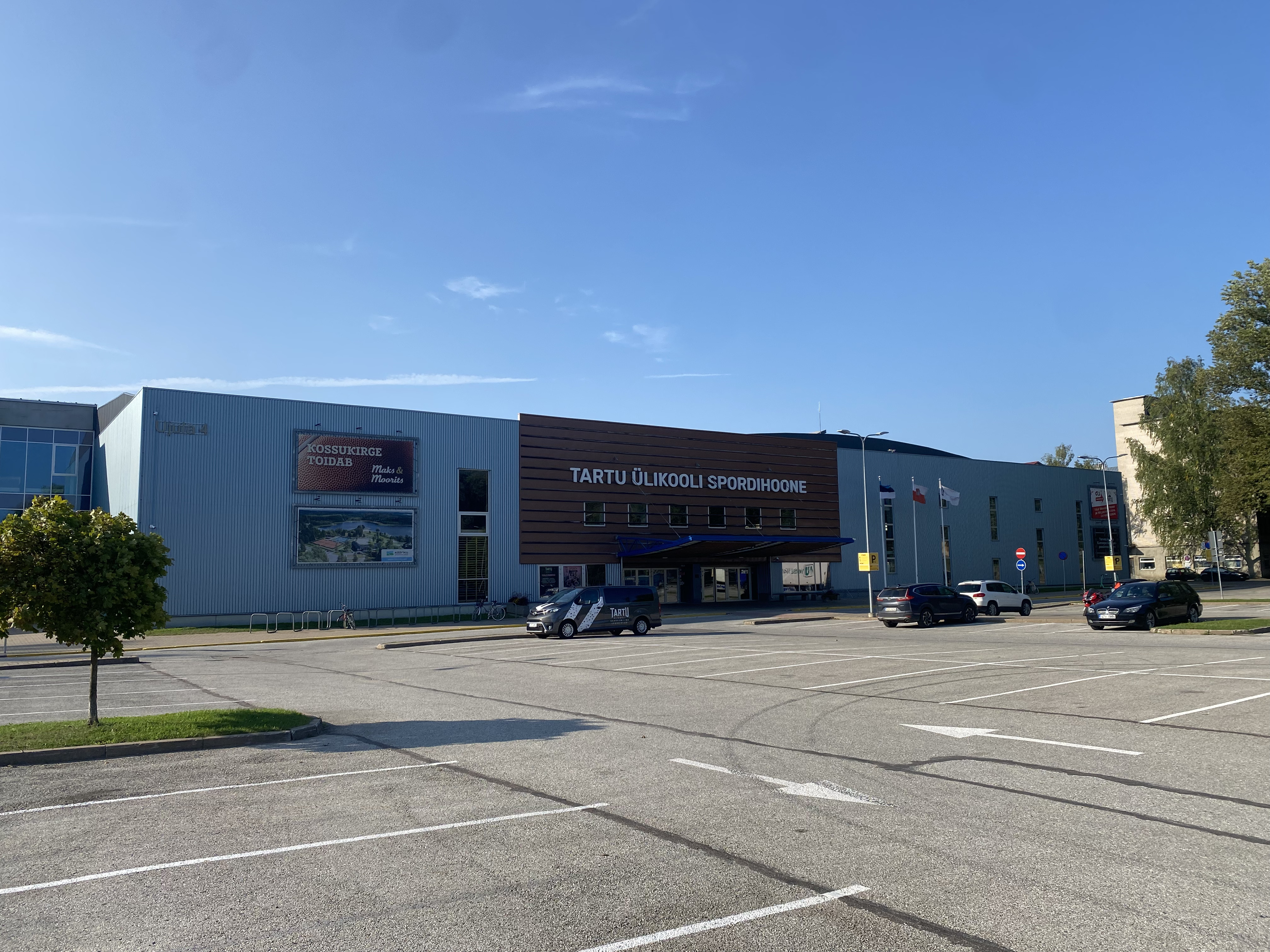
University of Tartu Sports Hall

- Estonian University of Life Sciences Sports Hall (1960–1981)
- University of Tartu Sports Hall (1982–present)

== Players ==
=== Current roster ===
Note: Flags indicate national team eligibility at FIBA-sanctioned events. Players may hold other non-FIBA nationalities not displayed.

Tartu Ülikool Maks & Moorits roster
Players
Coaches

Pos.	No.	Nat.	Name	Ht.	Wt.	Age
PG	0	(Estonia)	Lepp, Tanel	1.91 m (6 ft 3 in)	83 kg (183 lb)	19 – 15 August 2007
SG	1	(Estonia)	Rosenthal, Märt	1.93 m (6 ft 4 in)	86 kg (190 lb)	27 – 15 March 1999
SG	2	(Estonia)	Valge, Robert	1.90 m (6 ft 3 in)	86 kg (190 lb)	29 – 20 April 1997
SF	3	(Estonia)	Hint, Aleksander Oliver	1.97 m (6 ft 6 in)	94 kg (207 lb)	26 – 27 May 2000
PF	4	(United States)	Maidoh, Chris	2.03 m (6 ft 8 in)	101 kg (223 lb)	26 – 18 July 2000
PF	5	(Estonia)	Perv, Thor Andreas	1.98 m (6 ft 6 in)	94 kg (207 lb)	19 – 16 May 2007
SG	7	(United States)	Smith-McEwen, Mack	1.85 m (6 ft 1 in)	96 kg (212 lb)	28 – 28 January 1998
SF	11	(United States)	Palek III, Keith	2.01 m (6 ft 7 in)	100 kg (220 lb)	23 – 1 June 2003
SG	12	(Ukraine)	Kaziuk, Yevhen	2.00 m (6 ft 7 in)	92 kg (203 lb)	18 – 16 February 2008
SF	16	(Estonia)	Andre, Rasmus	2.00 m (6 ft 7 in)	97 kg (214 lb)	22 – 26 May 2004
PG	18	(Estonia)	Roos, Rando	1.82 m (6 ft 0 in)	84 kg (185 lb)	22 – 18 September 2004
C	20	(Estonia)	Nurger, Rauno	2.05 m (6 ft 9 in)	107 kg (236 lb)	32 – 24 November 1993
PF	22	(Egypt)	El-Sheikh, Omar	2.05 m (6 ft 9 in)	97 kg (214 lb)	28 – 14 May 1998
C	34	(Ukraine)	Sinnik, Vladyslav	2.03 m (6 ft 8 in)	97 kg (214 lb)	19 – 31 January 2007
SG	40	(Estonia)	Paasoja, Martin (C)	1.88 m (6 ft 2 in)	87 kg (192 lb)	33 – 4 January 1993

Head coach

- (Estonia) Aivar Kuusmaa

Assistant coach(es)

- (Estonia) Olari Narits
- (Estonia) Toomas Kandimaa

Legend

- (C) Team captain
- Injured

- Roster
Updated: 8 October 2026

=== Depth chart ===
Pos.	Starting 5	Bench 1	Bench 2
C	Chris Maidoh	Rauno Nurger	Vladyslav Sinnik
PF	Omar El-Sheikh	Keith Palek III	Yevhen Kaziuk
SF	Rasmus Andre	Aleksander Oliver Hint	Thor Andreas Perv
SG	Mack Smith-McEwen	Robert Valge	Tanel Lepp
PG	Märt Rosenthal	Martin Paasoja	Rando Roos

=== Squad changes for/during the 2026–27 season ===
==== In ====
No.	Pos.	Nat.	Name	Moving from	
3	SF	(Estonia)	Aleksander Oliver Hint	BC Pärnu	(Estonia)
4	C	(United States)	Chris Maidoh	LWD Basket	(Netherlands)
22	SF	(Egypt)	Omar El-Sheikh	Maine Celtics	(United States)
7	SG	(United States)	Mack Smith-McEwen	MZT Skopje	(North Macedonia)
0	G	(Estonia)	Tanel Lepp	Tartu Ülikool/Estiko	(Estonia)
11	F	(United States)	Keith Palek III	Missouri State Bears	(United States)
1	SG	(Estonia)	Märt Rosenthal	BC Kalev	(Estonia)
5	PF	(Estonia)	Thor Andreas Perv	Reinar Halliku KK	(Estonia)

==== Out ====
No.	Pos.	Nat.	Name	Moving to	
0	PG	(United States)	Bryce McBride	Valmiera Glass VIA	(Latvia)
3	C	(United States)	Dylan Painter	Rapid București	(Romania)
4	SG	(Estonia)	Hannes Saar	Kalev	(Estonia)
5	PG	(Estonia)	Rait-Riivo Laane	Keila Basket	(Estonia)
9	PF	(Estonia)	Karl Johan Lips	Stal Ostrów Wielkopolski	(Poland)
11	PF	(Estonia)	Karl Gustav Jurtšenko	Viimsi	(Estonia)
27	SG	(Estonia)	Kaur-Erik Suurorg	BC Pärnu	(Estonia)
35	PF	(Estonia)	Markus Ilver	Legia Warsaw	(Poland)

== Head coaches ==
- (Estonia) Aleksander Illi 1937
- (Estonia) Oskar Erikson 1938–1940
- (Estonia) Edgar Naarits 1948–1955
- (Estonia) Ernst Ehaveer 1956–1983
- (Estonia) Arne Laos 1983–1992
- (Estonia) Jüri Neissaar 1992–1997, 2000–2003
- (Estonia) Teet Laur 1997–2000
- (Estonia) Tõnu Lust 2003–2005
- (Estonia) Paavo Russak 2005–2006
- (Lithuania) Algirdas Brazys 2006–2007
- (Estonia) Üllar Kerde 2007–2008
- (Estonia) Indrek Visnapuu 2008–2012
- (Estonia) Gert Kullamäe 2012–2017
- (Estonia) Priit Vene 2017–2020, 2024
- (Estonia) Toomas Kandimaa 2020–2021
- (Latvia) Nikolajs Mazurs 2021–2023
- (Latvia) Gundars Vētra 2023–2024
- (Estonia) Aivar Kuusmaa 2024–present

== Season by season ==
Season	Tier	Division	Pos.	Estonian Cup	Baltic competitions		Other competitions		European competitions	
1999–00	1	EKKA	1st	Champion					2 Saporta Cup	PR
2000–01	1	EKKA	1st	Champion			NEBL Challenge Cup	T9		
2001–02	1	EKKA	2nd	Runner-up			NEBL Challenge Cup	T12		
2002–03	1	KML	3rd	Champion					3 FIBA Europe Champions Cup	QR
2003–04	1	KML	1st	Quarterfinalist					4 FIBA Europe Cup	QR
2004–05	1	KML	2nd	Champion	Baltic Basketball League	10th			4 FIBA Europe Cup	CQF
2005–06	1	KML	2nd	Runner-up	Baltic Basketball League	12th				
2006–07	1	KML	1st	Runner-up	Baltic Basketball League	9th			4 FIBA EuroCup Challenge	PR
2007–08	1	KML	1st	Runner-up	Baltic Basketball League	8th			3 FIBA EuroCup	4th
2008–09	1	KML	2nd	Quarterfinalist	Baltic Basketball League	3rd			2 Eurocup	QR1
2008–09	1	KML	2nd	Quarterfinalist	Baltic Basketball League	3rd			3 EuroChallenge	RS
2009–10	1	KML	1st	Champion	Baltic Basketball League	5th			3 EuroChallenge	RS
2010–11	1	KML	2nd	Champion	Baltic Basketball League	5th			3 EuroChallenge	RS
2011–12	1	KML	2nd	Champion	Baltic Basketball League	12th				
2012–13	1	KML	2nd	Quarterfinalist	Baltic Basketball League	QF			3 EuroChallenge	RS
2013–14	1	KML	2nd	Champion	Baltic Basketball League	3rd			3 EuroChallenge	QF
2014–15	1	KML	1st	Champion	Baltic Basketball League	4th			3 EuroChallenge	L16
2015–16	1	KML	2nd	Runner-up	Baltic Basketball League	RU			3 FIBA Europe Cup	R32
2016–17	1	KML	3rd	Runner-up	Baltic Basketball League	3rd			3 Champions League	QR2
2016–17	1	KML	3rd	Runner-up	Baltic Basketball League	3rd			4 FIBA Europe Cup	RS
2017–18	1	KML	2nd		Baltic Basketball League	3rd			4 FIBA Europe Cup	QR2
2018–19	1	KML	5th		Estonian-Latvian Basketball League	6th				
2019–20	1	KML	4th (Note: The season was cancelled due to the COVID-19 pandemic.)		Estonian-Latvian Basketball League	–			4 FIBA Europe Cup	QR
2020–21	1	KML	6th	Quarterfinalist	Estonian-Latvian Basketball League	RS				
2021–22	1	KML	2nd	Champion	Estonian-Latvian Basketball League	8th	European North Basketball League	4th		
2022–23	1	KML	2nd	Third place	Estonian-Latvian Basketball League	3rd	European North Basketball League	RS		
2023–24	1	KML	2nd	Runner-up	Estonian-Latvian Basketball League	5th	European North Basketball League	QF		
2024–25	1	KML	2nd	Runner-up	Estonian-Latvian Basketball League	6th	European North Basketball League	RS		
2025–26	1	KML	1st	Champion	Estonian-Latvian Basketball League	RU			4 FIBA Europe Cup	RS
2026–27	1	KML		TBD	Estonian-Latvian Basketball League				4 FIBA Europe Cup	RS

== Trophies and awards ==
=== Trophies ===
- Estonian League

Winners (27): 1937–38, 1938–39, 1939–40, 1947–48, 1948–49, 1949–50, 1950–51, 1951–52, 1955–56, 1957–58, 1958–59, 1968–69, 1969–70, 1971–72, 1972–73, 1974–75, 1975–76, 1976–77, 1977–78, 1999–2000, 2000–01, 2003–04, 2006–07, 2007–08, 2009–10, 2014–15, 2025–26

- Estonian Cup

Winners (18): 1950, 1952, 1956, 1958, 1974, 1976, 1979, 2000, 2001, 2002, 2004, 2009, 2010, 2011, 2013, 2014, 2021, 2026

- Soviet Union League

Winners (1): 1948–49

- BBL Cup

Winners (1): 2010

=== Individual awards ===
KML Most Valuable Player

- Tanel Tein – 2001, 2002, 2006
- Augenijus Vaškys – 2004
- Brian Cusworth – 2008

KML Finals MVP

- Tanel Tein – 2007
- Brian Cusworth – 2008
- Janar Talts – 2010
- Tanel Kurbas – 2015
- Bryce McBride – 2026

KML Best Defender

- Janar Talts – 2015, 2016

KML Best Young Player

- Veljo Vares – 2001
- Rain Veideman – 2011
- Arnas Velička – 2019

KML Coach of the Year

- Jüri Neissaar – 2001
- Tõnu Lust – 2004
- Üllar Kerde – 2008
- Gert Kullamäe – 2015

KML All-Star Five

- Tarmo Kikerpill – 2001, 2002, 2004, 2005
- Toomas Liivak – 2001
- Tanel Tein – 2001, 2006, 2007, 2008
- Toomas Kandimaa – 2002
- Augenijus Vaškys – 2004
- Vallo Allingu – 2004, 2006
- Marek Doronin – 2005
- Gert Kullamäe – 2007
- Brian Cusworth – 2008
- Janar Talts – 2008, 2009, 2010, 2014, 2015, 2018
- George Tsintsadze – 2008, 2009
- Scott Morrison – 2010
- Sten Sokk – 2011
- Bill Amis – 2012
- Tanel Kurbas – 2014
- Augustas Pečiukevičius – 2014
- Janari Jõesaar – 2017
- Tanel Sokk – 2018
- Märt Rosenthal – 2022, 2024
- Emmanuel Wembi – 2022
- Ty Gordon – 2023
- Omar El-Sheikh – 2025
- Karl Johan Lips – 2025
- Markus Ilver – 2026
- Dylan Painter – 2026

Estonian Cup MVP

- Vallo Allingu – 2011
- Augustas Pečiukevičius – 2013
- Janar Talts – 2014
- Märt Rosenthal – 2021
- Karl Johan Lips – 2026

Estonian–Latvian League Regular Season MVP

- Karl Johan Lips – 2026

Estonian–Latvian League All-Star Five

- Ty Gordon – 2023
- Markus Ilver – 2026
- Karl Johan Lips – 2026

== Notable players ==
Note: Flags indicate national team eligibility at FIBA-sanctioned events. Players may hold other non-FIBA nationalities not displayed.

Criteria

To appear in this section a player must have either:

- Set a club record or won an individual award while at the club
- Played at least one official international match for their national team at any time
- Played at least one official NBA match at any time.

- (Estonia) Vallo Allingu
- (Estonia) Marek Doronin
- (Estonia) Timo Eichfuss
- (Estonia) Kregor Hermet
- (Estonia) Janari Jõesaar
- (Estonia) Toomas Kandimaa
- (Estonia) Tarmo Kikerpill
- (Estonia) Kristjan Kitsing
- (Estonia) Kerr Kriisa
- (Estonia) Anatoli Krikun
- (Estonia) Heino Kruus
- (Estonia) Ilmar Kullam
- (Estonia) Gert Kullamäe
- (Estonia) Tanel Kurbas
- (Estonia) Mart Laga
- (Estonia) Jaak Lipso
- (Estonia) Joann Lõssov
- (Estonia) Martin Müürsepp
- (Estonia) Märt Rosenthal
- (Estonia) Sten Sokk
- (Estonia) Tanel Sokk
- (Estonia) Janar Talts
- (Estonia) Aleksei Tammiste
- (Estonia) Tanel Tein
- (Estonia) Rain Veideman
- (Estonia) Heino Veskila
- (Georgia (country)) Giorgi Tsintsadze
- (Lithuania) Augustas Pečiukevičius
- (Lithuania) Augenijus Vaškys
- (Lithuania) Arnas Velička
- (United States) Bill Amis
- (United States) Brian Cusworth
- (United States) Ty Gordon
- (United States) Scott Morrison
