= Üllar Kerde =

Estonian basketball coach

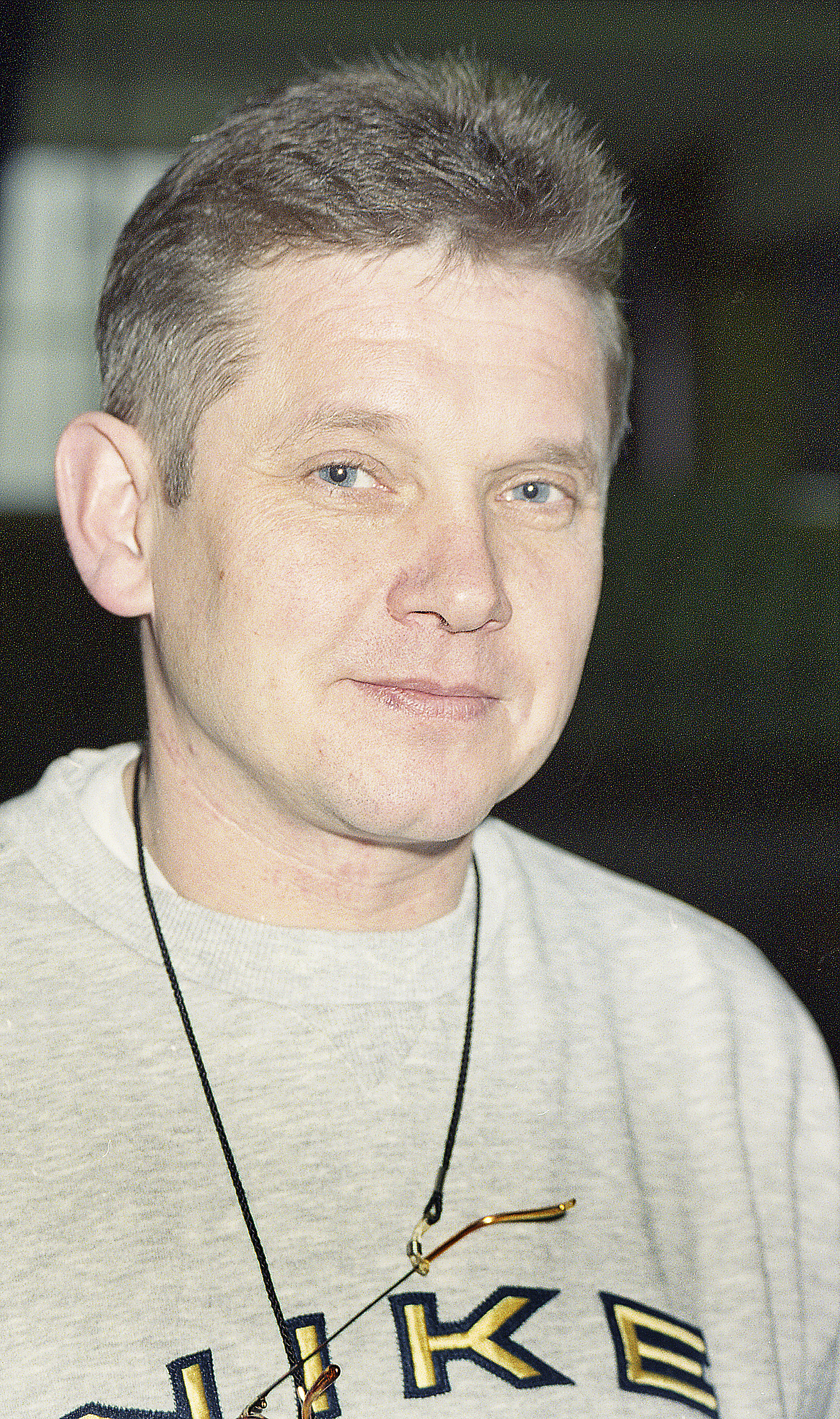
Üllar Kerde in 1999

Üllar Kerde (born 1 April 1954) is an Estonian basketball coach. Currently he is the coach of BC Dynamo Moscow. He has also been the coach of Estonia national basketball team leading it to the EuroBasket 2001 which Estonia finished 14th.

Kerde was born in Tallinn. In his club career, he coached Estonia's top team Tartu Ülikool/Rock and TTÜ KK. Kerde led Tartu Ülikool/Rock to EuroCup final four in 2007/2008 season and won the Estonian Championship title by beating BC Kalev/Cramo in four games.
