= Korvpalli Meistriliiga =

Estonian basketball league for the highest division

- Founded: 1925; 101 years ago
- First season: 1925
- Country: Estonia
- Confederation: FIBA Europe
- Number of teams: 7
- Level on pyramid: 1
- Relegation to: I liiga
- Domestic cup: Estonian Cup
- International cup(s): Champions League; FIBA Europe Cup
- Current champions: Tartu Ülikool (27th title) (2025–26)
- Most championships: Tartu Ülikool (27 titles)
- TV partners: Delfi TV, Inspira
- Website: basket.ee
- 2026 KML Playoffs

The Korvpalli Meistriliiga (KML), known as Optibet Korvpalli Meistriliiga for sponsorship reasons, is the top-tier men's basketball league in Estonia. The league is organized by the Estonian Basketball Association and played under FIBA rules.

The competition was founded in 1925. From the 1998–99 season until the end of the 2001–02 season the league was organized by the Eesti Korvpalliklubide Assotsiatsioon (English: Estonian Basketball Clubs' Association). As of the 2018–19 season, Estonian-Latvian Basketball League regular season games count towards the KML standings, followed by KML Play-offs. The most successful team in the competition is Tartu Ülikool (University of Tartu), with 26 titles.

== History ==
=== Names of the competition ===
- 1994–1998: Eesti Meeste Korvpalliliiga (EMKL)
- 1998–2002: Eesti Korvpalliklubide Assotsiatsioon (EKKA)
- 2002–present: Korvpalli Meistriliiga (KML)

=== Title sponsorship ===
- 2002–2004: Peugeot Korvpalli Meistriliiga
- 2004–2009: Ühispanga/SEB Korvpalli Meistriliiga
- 2009–2013: G4S Korvpalli Meistriliiga
- 2013–2018: Alexela Korvpalli Meistriliiga
- 2018–2019: OlyBet Korvpalli Meistriliiga
- 2019–2024: PAF Korvpalli Meistriliiga
- 2026–present: Optibet Korvpalli Meistriliiga

== Current teams ==
Location of teams in 2026–27 KML

Team	Home city	Arena	Capacity
BC Pärnu	Pärnu	Pärnu Sports Hall	1,820
Bigbank/Kalev	Tallinn	Tondiraba Sports Center	5,840
Bigbank/Kalev	Tallinn	Kalev Sports Hall	1,700
Bigbank/Kalev	Tallinn	Nord Sports Hall	1,066
Keila Basket	Keila	Keila Health Center	800
Keila KK	Keila	Keila Health Center	800
TalTech/ALEXELA	Tallinn	TalTech Sports Hall	1,000
Tartu Ülikool Maks & Moorits	Tartu	University of Tartu Sports Hall	2,600
Viimsi	Haabneeme	Forus Sports Center	500

== Title holders ==
- 1925: Tallinna Sport
- 1927: Tallinna Kalev
- 1928: Tallinna Vitjas
- 1929: Tallinna Russ
- 1930: Tallinna Kalev
- 1931: Tallinna Kalev
- 1932: Tallinna Russ
- 1933: Tallinna Russ
- 1934: Tartu NMKÜ
- 1935: Tallinna NMKÜ
- 1936: Tartu NMKÜ
- 1937: Tartu NMKÜ
- 1938: Tartu EASK
- 1939: Tartu EASK
- 1940: Tartu EASK
- 1941: Tallinna Dünamo
- 1942: Tartu Kalev
- 1944 Summer: Tartu Kalev
- 1944 Winter: Tallinna Kalev
- 1945: Tallinna Kalev
- 1946: Tallinna Kalev
- 1947: Tallinna Kalev
- 1948: Tartu ÜSK
- 1949: Tartu ÜSK
- 1950: Tartu ÜSK
- 1951: Tartu ÜSK
- 1952: Tartu ÜSK
- 1953: Tallinna Kalev
- 1954: Tallinna Kalev
- 1955: Tallinna Kalev
- 1956: TRÜ
- 1957: EPA
- 1958: TRÜ
- 1959: TRÜ
- 1960: EPA
- 1961: TPI I
- 1962: TPI I
- 1963: TPI I
- 1964: TPI I
- 1965: TPI I
- 1966: TPI I
- 1967: Tallinna Kalev
- 1968: Tallinna Kalev
- 1969: TRÜ
- 1970: TRÜ
- 1971: Tallinna Kalev
- 1972: TRÜ
- 1973: TRÜ
- 1974: Harju KEK
- 1975: TRÜ
- 1976: TRÜ
- 1977: TRÜ
- 1977–78: TRÜ
- 1978–79: Harju KEK
- 1980: Standard
- 1981: Metallist
- 1981–82: Standard
- 1982–83: Standard
- 1983–84: TPI I
- 1984–85: TPI I
- 1985–86: Standard
- 1986–87: Standard
- 1987–88: Standard
- 1988–89: Standard
- 1989–90: Standard
- 1990–91: Asto
- 1991–92: BC Kalev
- 1992–93: BC Rafter
- 1993–94: Asto
- 1994–95: BC Kalev/Auma
- 1995–96: BC Kalev
- 1996–97: BC Tallinn
- 1997–98: BC Kalev
- 1998–99: BC Tallinn
- 1999–00: Tartu Ülikool-Delta
- 2000–01: Tartu Ülikool-Delta
- 2001–02: Tallinna Kalev
- 2002–03: Tallinna Kalev
- 2003–04: TÜ/Rock
- 2004–05: Ehitustööriist
- 2005–06: BC Kalev/Cramo
- 2006–07: TÜ/Rock
- 2007–08: TÜ/Rock
- 2008–09: BC Kalev/Cramo
- 2009–10: TÜ/Rock
- 2010–11: BC Kalev/Cramo
- 2011–12: BC Kalev/Cramo
- 2012–13: BC Kalev/Cramo
- 2013–14: BC Kalev/Cramo
- 2014–15: TÜ/Rock
- 2015–16: BC Kalev/Cramo
- 2016–17: BC Kalev/Cramo
- 2017–18: BC Kalev/Cramo
- 2018–19: BC Kalev/Cramo
- 2019–20: Cancelled due to the COVID-19 pandemic.
- 2020–21: BC Kalev/Cramo
- 2021–22: Pärnu Sadam
- 2022–23: BC Kalev/Cramo
- 2023–24: BC Kalev/Cramo
- 2024–25: BC Kalev/Cramo
- 2025–26: Tartu Ülikool Maks & Moorits

== Finals ==
Season	Champion	Series	Runner-up	Champion's coach	Finals MVP
1992–93	BC Rafter	2–0	Asto	(Estonia) Riho Soonik	Not awarded
1993–94	Asto	2–1	Baltika	(Estonia) Jaanus Levkoi	Not awarded
1994–95	BC Kalev/Auma	3–1	BC Tallinn	(Estonia) Jaak Salumets	Not awarded
1995–96	BC Kalev	3–0	KK Tartu	(Estonia) Jaak Salumets	Not awarded
1996–97	BC Tallinn	3–1	Baltika	(Estonia) Üllar Kerde	Not awarded
1997–98	BC Kalev	3–1	BC Tallinn	(Netherlands) Maarten van Gent	Not awarded
1998–99	BC Tallinn	3–0	Nybit	(Estonia) Üllar Kerde	Not awarded
1999–00	Tartu Ülikool-Delta	3–0	Tallinna Kalev	(Estonia) Teet Laur	Not awarded
2000–01	Tartu Ülikool-Delta	3–0	Tallinna Ülikoolid-A. Le Coq	(Estonia) Jüri Neissaar	Not awarded
2001–02	Tallinna Kalev	3–2	Tartu Rock	(Estonia) Üllar Kerde	Not awarded
2002–03	Tallinna Kalev	4–2	TTÜ/A. Le Coq	(Estonia) Andres Sõber	Not awarded
2003–04	TÜ/Rock	4–2	EBS/Nybit	(Estonia) Tõnu Lust	Not awarded
2004–05	Ehitustööriist	4–3	TÜ/Rock	(Estonia) Allan Dorbek	Not awarded
2005–06	BC Kalev/Cramo	4–3	TÜ/Rock	(Estonia) Aivar Kuusmaa	(United States) James Williams
2006–07	TÜ/Rock	4–2	Tallinna BC Kalev/Cramo	(Lithuania) Algirdas Brazys	(Estonia) Tanel Tein
2007–08	TÜ/Rock	4–0	Tallinna BC Kalev/Cramo	(Estonia) Üllar Kerde	(United States) Brian Cusworth
2008–09	BC Kalev/Cramo	4–2	TÜ/Rock	(New Zealand) Nenad Vučinić	(Estonia) Kristjan Kangur
2009–10	TÜ/Rock	4–2	BC Rakvere Tarvas	(Estonia) Indrek Visnapuu	(Estonia) Janar Talts
2010–11	BC Kalev/Cramo	4–0	TÜ/Rock	(Estonia) Aivar Kuusmaa	(Latvia) Armands Šķēle
2011–12	BC Kalev/Cramo	4–0	Tartu Ülikool	(Estonia) Aivar Kuusmaa	(Estonia) Tanel Sokk
2012–13	BC Kalev/Cramo	4–0	TÜ/Rock	(Estonia) Alar Varrak	(Estonia) Tanel Sokk
2013–14	BC Kalev/Cramo	4–0	TÜ/Rock	(Estonia) Alar Varrak	(Romania) Vlad Moldoveanu
2014–15	TÜ/Rock	4–1	BC Kalev/Cramo	(Estonia) Gert Kullamäe	(Estonia) Tanel Kurbas
2015–16	BC Kalev/Cramo	4–1	TÜ/Rock	(Estonia) Alar Varrak	(Latvia) Rolands Freimanis
2016–17	BC Kalev/Cramo	4–0	AVIS UTILITAS Rapla	(Estonia) Alar Varrak	(Bulgaria) Branko Mirković
2017–18	BC Kalev/Cramo	4–0	Tartu Ülikool	(Lithuania) Donaldas Kairys	(Estonia) Kristjan Kangur
2018–19	BC Kalev/Cramo	3–0	Tallinna Kalev/TLÜ	(Lithuania) Donaldas Kairys	(Bulgaria) Branko Mirković
2019–20	Not held due to the COVID-19 pandemic.				
2020–21	BC Kalev/Cramo	3–1	Pärnu Sadam	(Latvia) Roberts Štelmahers	(United States) Chavaughn Lewis
2021–22	Pärnu Sadam	3–0	Tartu Ülikool Maks & Moorits	(Estonia) Heiko Rannula	(Latvia) Andris Misters
2022–23	BC Kalev/Cramo	3–0	Tartu Ülikool Maks & Moorits	(Estonia) Heiko Rannula	(Ukraine) Oleksandr Kovliar
2023–24	BC Kalev/Cramo	3–0	Tartu Ülikool Maks & Moorits	(Estonia) Heiko Rannula	(United States) Ben Shungu
2024–25	BC Kalev/Cramo	3–2	Tartu Ülikool Maks & Moorits	(Estonia) Indrek Reinbok	(Finland) Severi Kaukiainen
2025–26	Tartu Ülikool Maks & Moorits	3–2	Kalev/Cramo	(Estonia) Aivar Kuusmaa	(United States) Bryce McBride

== Titles by team ==
Team	Titles	Champion years
Tartu Ülikool (Note: Includes results as Tartu EASK, Tartu ÜSK and TRÜ)	27	1938, 1939, 1940, 1948, 1949, 1950, 1951, 1952, 1956, 1958, 1959, 1969, 1970, 1972, 1973, 1975, 1976, 1977, 1978, 2000, 2001, 2004, 2007, 2008, 2010, 2015, 2026
Tallinna Kalev (Note: Folded in 2005)	20	1927, 1930, 1931, 1944, (Note: Winter tournament) 1945, 1946, 1947, 1953, 1954, 1955, 1967, 1968, 1971, 1992, 1993, 1995, 1996, 1998, 2002, 2003
Kalev (Note: Includes results as Ehitustööriist)	15	2005, 2006, 2009, 2011, 2012, 2013, 2014, 2016, 2017, 2018, 2019, 2021, 2023, 2024, 2025
TPI	8	1961, 1962, 1963, 1964, 1965, 1966, 1984, 1985
Standard	8	1980, 1982, 1983, 1986, 1987, 1988, 1989, 1990
Tallinna Russ (Note: Includes results as Tallinna Vitjas)	4	1928, 1929, 1932, 1933
TTÜ-A. Le Coq (Note: Includes results as Asto and BC Tallinn)	4	1991, 1994, 1997, 1999
Tartu NMKÜ	3	1934, 1936, 1937
Tartu Kalev	2	1942, 1944 (Note: Summer tournament)
EPA	2	1957, 1960
Harju KEK	2	1974, 1979
Tallinna Sport	1	1925
Tallinna NMKÜ	1	1935
Tallinna Dünamo	1	1941
Metallist	1	1981
Pärnu	1	2022

== All Star Game ==
Korvpalli Meistriliiga used to organize the Estonian All-Star Game since 2000-01 before the merge with the Latvian league. The All-Star Game continued even after the Baltic Basketball All-Star Game was introduced.

=== Notable players ===
Player	All-Star
(Estonia) Tanel Sokk	2005, 2006
(Estonia) Aivar Kuusmaa	2000, 2002, 2006
(Estonia) Martin Müürsepp	2006
(Estonia) Tanel Tein	2001
(Estonia) Janar Talts	2002

== Awards ==
- KML Most Valuable Player Award
- KML Finals Most Valuable Player Award
- KML Best Defender Award
- KML Best Young Player Award
- KML Coach of the Year Award
- KML All-Star Five

== See also ==
- Estonian-Latvian Basketball League
- Estonian Basketball Cup
