= TTÜ-A. Le Coq =

Estonian basketball club

- Founded: 1989; 36 years ago
- Dissolved: 2002
- History: Asto (1989–1994); BC Tallinn (1994–1999); Tallinna Ülikoolid-A. Le Coq (1999–2001); TTÜ-A. Le Coq (2001–2002)
- Arena: TTÜ Sports Hall
- Location: Tallinn

TTÜ-A. Le Coq was an Estonian professional basketball club founded in 1989 and dissolved in 2002. They played in the Estonian League.

The team won 4 Estonian League championships and 1 Estonian Cup.

The team played its home games at TTÜ Sports Hall.

== History ==
Founded as Asto Basket in 1989, the team won two Estonian League championships in 1990–91 and 1993–94. In 1994, the club was renamed BC Tallinn and won two more titles in 1996–97 and 1998–99. In 1999, the club was renamed Tallinna Ülikoolid-A. Le Coq and won the Estonian Cup. The club folded after the 2001–02 season, when the main sponsors Tallinn University of Technology and A. Le Coq shifted their support to Hotronic.

== Honours ==
=== League ===
- Estonian League: 4

1990–91, 1993–94, 1996–97, 1998–99

=== Cups ===
- Estonian Cup: 1

1999
