= 2014 KML Playoffs =

Estonian national championships in basketball

The 2014 KML Playoffs was the final phase of the 2013–14 KML season. The playoffs began on 16 April and ended on 21 May. The tournament concluded with Kalev/Cramo defeating TÜ/Rock 4 games to 0 in the finals. Vlad Moldoveanu was named KML Finals MVP.

== Bracket ==
Quarter-finals
1	TÜ/Rock	3
8	Valga/Maks & Moorits	0
4	TTÜ	1
5	Tallinna Kalev	3
2	Kalev/Cramo	3
7	TYCO Rapla	0
3	Rakvere Tarvas	3
6	Pärnu	0

Semi-finals
1	TÜ/Rock	3
5	Tallinna Kalev	0
2	Kalev/Cramo	3
3	Rakvere Tarvas	0

Finals
1	TÜ/Rock	0
2	Kalev/Cramo	4
Third place
3	Rakvere Tarvas	2
5	Tallinna Kalev	1

== Quarter-finals ==
The quarter-finals are best-of-5 series.

=== TÜ/Rock vs. Valga/Maks & Moorits ===
16 April
19:00

Boxscore

TÜ/Rock	82–57	Valga/Maks & Moorits
Scoring by quarter: 22-8, 24-22, 22-15, 14-12
Pts: Simpson 13; Rebs: Dilys 13; Asts: Simpson 5		Pts: Myrick 20; Rebs: Myrick 11; Asts: Peterson 3

University of Tartu Sports Hall, Tartu
Attendance: 300
Referees: Mihkel Männiste, Rain Peerandi, Janek Saluse

18 April
17:00

Boxscore

Valga/Maks & Moorits	54–86	TÜ/Rock
Scoring by quarter: 15-22, 10-31, 17-9, 12-24
Pts: Evart 15; Rebs: Myrick 9 Asts: Ortega 5		Pts: four players 12; Rebs: Toome 8 Asts: Simpson 5

Valga Sports Hall, Valga
Attendance: 200
Referees: Madis Allik, Aare Halliko, Rain Peerandi

21 April
19:00

Boxscore

TÜ/Rock	94–76	Valga/Maks & Moorits
Scoring by quarter: 31-30, 21-14, 17-19, 25-13
Pts: Talts 20; Rebs: three players 7 Asts: Simpson 7		Pts: Myrick 23; Rebs: three players 6 Asts: Ortega 4
TÜ/Rock wins series 3–0

University of Tartu Sports Hall, Tartu
Attendance: 200
Referees: Indrek Kelement, Ranno Konks, Andres Tobi

=== Kalev/Cramo vs. TYCO Rapla ===
15 April
19:00

Boxscore

Kalev/Cramo	83–68	TYCO Rapla
Scoring by quarter: 26-16, 15-14, 16-20, 26-18
Pts: Arbet, Moldoveanu 20; Rebs: Moldoveanu 13; Asts: Moldoveanu 4		Pts: three players 13; Rebs: Fifolt 8 Asts: Dorbek 5

Saku Arena, Tallinn
Attendance: 300
Referees: Oliver Jakobson, Indrek Kelement, Rain Peerandi

21 April
19:30

Boxscore

TYCO Rapla	63–83	Kalev/Cramo
Scoring by quarter: 8-15, 15-19, 12-26, 28-23
Pts: Kaldre 16; Rebs: Fifolt 10; Asts: Dorbek, Metsalu 3		Pts: Kitsing 15; Rebs: Elegar 13; Asts: Millage 7

Sadolin Sports Hall, Rapla
Attendance: 869
Referees: Jegor Mitrofanski, Rain Rannamets, Timo Suslov

22 April
19:00

Boxscore

Kalev/Cramo	87–70	TYCO Rapla
Scoring by quarter: 27-12, 22-22, 19-22, 19-14
Pts: Millage 26; Rebs: Elegar 12; Asts: Sokk, Veideman 4		Pts: Šišić 18; Rebs: Šišić 11; Asts: Laane, Šišić 3
Kalev/Cramo wins series 3–0

Otepää Sports Hall, Otepää
Attendance: 300
Referees: Aleksei Mohov, Rain Peerandi, Mart Uuehendrik

=== Rakvere Tarvas vs. Pärnu ===
13 April
18:00

Boxscore

Rakvere Tarvas	86–53	Pärnu
Scoring by quarter: 13-20, 28-8, 21-10, 24-15
Pts: Umbraško 18; Rebs: Umbraško 6 Asts: Ļaksa, Saare 3		Pts: Raadik 14; Rebs: Vahter 8 Asts: Raap 2

Rakvere Sports Hall, Rakvere
Attendance: 450
Referees: Aleksei Mohov, Timo Suslov, Mart Uuehendrik

15 April
19:00

Boxscore

Pärnu	72–86	Rakvere Tarvas
Scoring by quarter: 16-36, 17-15, 23-10, 16-25
Pts: Raadik, Vahter 15; Rebs: Raadik 12; Asts: Raap 6		Pts: Ļaksa 19; Rebs: Gustas 9 Asts: Gustas 11

Pärnu Sports Hall, Pärnu
Attendance: 300
Referees: Aare Halliko, Jegor Mitrofanski, Rain Rannamets

18 April
19:00

Boxscore

Rakvere Tarvas	76–54	Pärnu
Scoring by quarter: 22-13, 14-12, 12-11, 28-18
Pts: Saare 18; Rebs: Gustas 12; Asts: Gustas 7		Pts: Vahter 10; Rebs: Raadik 12; Asts: Raap 3
Rakvere Tarvas wins series 3–0

Rakvere Sports Hall, Rakvere
Attendance: 525
Referees: Oliver Jakobson, Ranno Konks, Andres Tobi

=== TTÜ vs. Tallinna Kalev ===
9 April
19:00

Boxscore

Tallinna Kalev	72–59	TTÜ
Scoring by quarter: 22-8, 16-15, 18-22, 16-14
Pts: Saks 20; Rebs: Ampim 14; Asts: Lindmets 5		Pts: Järveläinen, Puidet 10; Rebs: Puidet 10; Asts: Puidet 5

Kalev Sports Hall, Tallinn
Attendance: 250
Referees: Oliver Jakobson, Rain Peerandi, Timo Suslov

11 April
18:30

Boxscore

TTÜ	75–66	Tallinna Kalev
Scoring by quarter: 12-15, 16-19, 16-17, 31-15
Pts: Akenpärg 24; Rebs: Raadik 9 Asts: four players 3		Pts: Tamm 18; Rebs: Mims 10; Asts: Roos 5

TTÜ Sports Hall, Tallinn
Attendance: 450
Referees: Madis Allik, Aare Halliko, Mihkel Männiste

13 April
16:00

Boxscore

TTÜ	63–64	Tallinna Kalev
Scoring by quarter: 17-14, 20-16, 11-22, 15-12
Pts: Raadik 15; Rebs: Puidet 11; Asts: Puidet 6		Pts: Lindmets 16; Rebs: Ampim 11; Asts: Ampim 3

TTÜ Sports Hall, Tallinn
Attendance: 350
Referees: Rain Rannamets, Janek Saluse, Andres Tobi

23 April
19:00

Boxscore

Tallinna Kalev	60–58	TTÜ
Scoring by quarter: 16-10, 13-18, 15-17, 16-13
Pts: Tamm 15; Rebs: Roos 7 Asts: Lindmets 4		Pts: Akenpärg 13; Rebs: Raadik 12; Asts: Puidet 4
Tallinna Kalev wins series 3–1

Kalev Sports Hall, Tallinn
Attendance: 150
Referees: Aare Halliko, Mihkel Männiste, Aleksei Mohov

== Semi-finals ==
The semi-finals are best-of-5 series.

=== TÜ/Rock vs. Tallinna Kalev ===
30 April
19:00

Boxscore

TÜ/Rock	75–48	Tallinna Kalev
Scoring by quarter: 24-8, 18-12, 15-8, 18-20
Pts: Dorbek, Kurbas 14; Rebs: three players 9 Asts: Simpson 7		Pts: Roos 13; Rebs: Mims 10; Asts: Liivak, Roos 3

University of Tartu Sports Hall, Tartu
Attendance: 500
Referees: Jegor Mitrofanski, Aleksei Mohov, Rain Peerandi

3 May
17:00

Boxscore

Tallinna Kalev	52–72	TÜ/Rock
Scoring by quarter: 17-14, 6-20, 16-23, 13-15
Pts: Lindmets 15; Rebs: Ampim 8 Asts: six players 1		Pts: Kurbas 20; Rebs: Toome 13; Asts: Meister, Talts 4

Kalev Sports Hall, Tallinn
Attendance: 250
Referees: Madis Allik, Indrek Kelement, Timo Suslov

5 May
19:00

Boxscore

TÜ/Rock	84–70	Tallinna Kalev
Scoring by quarter: 24-26, 16-17, 27-12, 17-15
Pts: Talts 22; Rebs: Talts 10; Asts: Simpson 4		Pts: Tamm 18; Rebs: Mims 11; Asts: Roos 3
TÜ/Rock wins series 3–0

University of Tartu Sports Hall, Tartu
Attendance: 250
Referees: Ranno Konks, Mihkel Männiste, Andres Tobi

=== Kalev/Cramo vs. Rakvere Tarvas ===
29 April
19:00

Boxscore

Kalev/Cramo	95–69	Rakvere Tarvas
Scoring by quarter: 31-19, 17-14, 19-21, 28-15
Pts: Millage 25; Rebs: Elegar 11; Asts: Veideman 4		Pts: Kurg 15; Rebs: Umbraško 9 Asts: Ļaksa, Metsaru 2

Saku Arena, Tallinn
Attendance: 900
Referees: Aare Halliko, Rauno Peerandi, Rain Rannamets

2 May
19:00

Boxscore

Rakvere Tarvas	78–88	Kalev/Cramo
Scoring by quarter: 15-29, 16-24, 25-17, 22-18
Pts: Ļaksa 23; Rebs: Saage 7 Asts: three players 3		Pts: Millage 21; Rebs: Elegar 11; Asts: Veideman 5

Rakvere Sports Hall, Rakvere
Attendance: 1000
Referees: Mihkel Männiste, Timo Suslov, Andres Tobi

4 May
17:00

Boxscore

Kalev/Cramo	99–68	Rakvere Tarvas
Scoring by quarter: 22-20, 26-17, 30-10, 21-21
Pts: Elegar 18; Rebs: Elegar 11; Asts: Millage 4		Pts: Gustas 18; Rebs: Ļaksa 9 Asts: Gustas 3
Kalev/Cramo wins series 3–0

Kalev Sports Hall, Tallinn
Attendance: 800
Referees: Oliver Jakobson, Rauno Peerandi, Janek Saluse

== Third place ==
The finals are best-of-3 series.

=== Rakvere Tarvas vs. Tallinna Kalev ===
9 May
18:00

Boxscore

Tallinna Kalev	84–72	Rakvere Tarvas
Scoring by quarter: 24-20, 18-27, 19-11, 23-14
Pts: Paiste 28; Rebs: Paiste, Tamm 10; Asts: Tamm 4		Pts: Kurg, Umbraško 15; Rebs: Umbraško 7 Asts: Gustas 4

Kalev Sports Hall, Tallinn
Attendance: 600
Referees: Oliver Jakobson, Aleksei Mohov, Rain Peerandi

12 May
19:00

Boxscore

Rakvere Tarvas	81–80	Tallinna Kalev
Scoring by quarter: 12-19, 24-24, 23-18, 22-19
Pts: Gustas 21; Rebs: Leppik 8 Asts: Saare 4		Pts: Ampim 24; Rebs: Paiste 10; Asts: Tamm 4

Rakvere Sports Hall, Rakvere
Attendance: 850
Referees: Aare Halliko, Ranno Konks, Rain Rannamets

14 May
19:00

Boxscore

Rakvere Tarvas	84–62	Tallinna Kalev
Scoring by quarter: 25-12, 26-12, 19-23, 14-15
Pts: Ļaksa 26; Rebs: Umbraško 8 Asts: Gustas 8		Pts: Paiste 22; Rebs: three players 6 Asts: Roos 3
Rakvere Tarvas wins series 2–1

Rakvere Sports Hall, Rakvere
Attendance: 1015
Referees: Aare Halliko, Rain Peerandi, Timo Suslov

== Finals ==
The finals are best-of-7 series.

=== TÜ/Rock vs. Kalev/Cramo ===
11 May
17:00

Boxscore

TÜ/Rock	72–75	Kalev/Cramo
Scoring by quarter: 17-27, 14-17, 13-11, 28-20
Pts: Toome 16; Rebs: Dorbek 6 Asts: Kurbas 3		Pts: Moldoveanu 27; Rebs: Elegar 16; Asts: Millage, Veideman 4

University of Tartu Sports Hall, Tartu
Attendance: 1600
Referees: Aare Halliko, Janek Saluse, Andres Tobi

13 May
19:00

Boxscore

TÜ/Rock	84–87	Kalev/Cramo
Scoring by quarter: 23-27, 12-19, 23-22, 26-19
Pts: Kurbas 22; Rebs: Toome 11; Asts: Simpson 8		Pts: Moldoveanu 19; Rebs: Elegar 11; Asts: Millage 4

University of Tartu Sports Hall, Tartu
Attendance: 1800
Referees: Mihkel Männiste, Rain Peerandi, Timo Suslov

19 May
19:00

Boxscore

Kalev/Cramo	80–64	TÜ/Rock
Scoring by quarter: 21-18, 21-14, 24-20, 14-12
Pts: Arbet 14; Rebs: Moldoveanu 13; Asts: Millage 3		Pts: Talts 13; Rebs: Talts 7 Asts: Dorbek, Simpson 3

Saku Arena, Tallinn
Attendance: 3700
Referees: Aare Halliko, Aleksei Mohov, Timo Suslov

21 May
19:00

Boxscore

Kalev/Cramo	83–72	TÜ/Rock
Scoring by quarter: 25-15, 18-21, 19-18, 21-18
Pts: Moldoveanu 19; Rebs: Moldoveanu 11; Asts: Sokk, Veideman 1		Pts: Eichfuss 17; Rebs: Dorbek 6 Asts: Simpson 5
Kalev/Cramo wins series 4–0

Saku Arena, Tallinn
Attendance: 2300
Referees: Aare Halliko, Mihkel Männiste, Rain Peerandi
