= 2024–25 Meistriliiga (ice hockey) season =

2024–25 Unibet Hokiliiga
- League: Meistriliiga
- Sport: Ice hockey
- Duration: 14 September 2024 – 28 March 2025
- Games: Regular season: 140; Postseason: 13
- Teams: 10

Regular season
- Season champions: Tartu Välk 494
- Runners-up: Kohtla-Järve Viru Sputnik

Playoffs
- Finals champions: Tartu Välk 494
- Runners-up: Narva PSK

Meistriliiga seasons
- ← 2023–24 2025–26 →

The 2024–25 Meistriliiga season was the 85th season of professional ice hockey in Estonia. Due to sponsorship, the Meistriliiga was known as the 'Unibet Hokiliiga'. The regular season ran from 14 September 2024 to 2 March 2025 with Tartu Välk 494 finishing atop the standings. The postseason ran from 8 March to 6 April 2025. Tartu Välk 494 defeated Narva PSK 3 games to 1 for the league championship.

== Membership changes ==
- HC Vipers Tallinn rejoined the league after being dormant since 2022.

== Teams ==
2024–25 Unibet Hokiliiga teams.

Team	City	Arena	Coach
HC Everest Kohtla-Järve	Kohtla-Järve	Kohtla-Järve Ice Hall	(Russia) Anatoli Dubkov
Kohtla-Järve Viru Sputnik	Kohtla-Järve	Kohtla-Järve Ice Hall	(Estonia) Vadim Bazura
Narva PSK	Narva	Narva Ice Hall	(Russia) Ilja Iljin
Tallinn HC Panter	Tallinn	Haabersti Ice Hall	(Finland) Mikko Mäenpää
HC Vipers Tallinn	Tallinn	Tondiraba Ice Hall	(Hungary) Bálint Fekti
Tartu Välk 494	Tartu	Astri Arena	(Estonia) Alexei Bogdanov

== Standings ==
=== Regular season ===
Pos	Team	Pld	W	OTW	OTL	L	GF	GA	GD	Pts	Qualification
1	Tartu Välk 494	20	14	1	1	4	122	73	+49	45	Advanced to Semifinals
2	Kohtla-Järve Viru Sputnik	20	10	3	2	5	103	72	+31	38	Advanced to Semifinals
3	Narva PSK	20	12	1	0	7	128	84	+44	38	Advanced to Semifinals
4	HC Everest Kohtla-Järve	20	10	0	2	8	114	102	+12	32	Advanced to Semifinals
5	Tallinn HC Panter	20	7	1	1	11	76	82	−6	24	
6	HC Vipers Tallinn	20	1	0	0	19	52	182	−130	3	

Source: Standings
Rules for classification: 1) Points; 2) Head-to-head points.

=== Statistics ===
==== Scoring leaders ====
Player	Team	Pos	GP	G	A	Pts	PIM
(Israel) Yakov Naumov	HC Everest Kohtla-Järve	C	20	25	30	55	8
(Estonia) Maksim Berezhonov	Narva PSK	F	17	25	27	52	4
(Ukraine) Oleksei Voytsekhovsky	Tartu Välk 494	F	19	14	27	41	20
(Russia) Kirill Iljin	Narva PSK	F	15	8	32	40	109
(Canada) Mickaël Hébert	Kohtla-Järve Viru Sputnik	C	19	17	21	38	42
(Estonia) Nikita Kirillov	Narva PSK	F	18	12	23	35	2
(Estonia) Georgi Vassiljev	Narva PSK	F	20	13	19	32	16
(Estonia) Vassili Titarenko	Tartu Välk 494	RW	17	12	18	30	8
(Estonia) Maksim Turovski	Kohtla-Järve Viru Sputnik	F	18	11	19	30	8
(Israel) Oskar Levin	HC Everest Kohtla-Järve	D	20	5	25	30	12

==== Leading goaltenders ====
The following goaltenders led the league in goals against average, provided that they have played at least 1/3 of their team's minutes.

Player	Team	GP	TOI	GA	SO	SV%	GAA
(Estonia) Daniil Seppenen	Tartu Välk 494	13	544	25	0	.910	2.76
(Estonia) Sergei Andrejev	Kohtla-Järve Viru Sputnik	10	535	25	1	.918	3.14
(Estonia) Hans Kristjan Tisler	Tallinn HC Panter	10	428	28	0	.876	3.65

== Playoffs ==
=== Bracket ===
Semifinals (best-of-5)
1	Tartu Välk 494	1	1	5	4*	7
4	HC Everest Kohtla-Järve	6	3	4	3	5
2	Kohtla-Järve Viru Sputnik	5	7	2	2	2
3	Narva PSK	3	6	5	4	13

Championship (best-of-5)
1	Tartu Välk 494	4	2	7	7	-
3	Narva PSK	2	5	2	2	-
Third Place
2	Kohtla-Järve Viru Sputnik	0
4	HC Everest Kohtla-Järve	1

Note: * denotes overtime period(s)
