= List of indoor arenas in Estonia =

The following is a list of indoor arenas in Estonia, ordered by capacity. The venues are by their final capacity after construction for seating-only events. There is more capacity if standing room is included (e.g. for concerts) or extra seats added.

== Current arenas ==
Image	Venue	Capacity	Location	Home team	Inaugurated	Ref
	Unibet Arena	7,200	Tallinn	Estonia men's national basketball team, BC Kalev	2001	
	Tondiraba Ice Hall	7,700	Tallinn	Estonia men's national ice hockey team, HC Vipers	2014	
	Rakvere Sports Hall	2,747	Rakvere	BC Rakvere Tarvas	2004	
	University of Tartu Sports Hall	2,600	Tartu	University of Tartu basketball team, Tartu Volleyball	1982	
	A. Le Coq Sports Hall	2,500	Tartu	Tartu Volleyball	2006	
	Kohtla-Järve Ice Hall	2,000	Kohtla-Järve	HC Everest, Viru Sputnik	1986	
	Pärnu Sports Hall	1,820	Pärnu	BC Pärnu, Pärnu VK	2009	
	Kalev Sports Hall	1,700	Tallinn	KK Kalev, BC Kalev, HC Tallinn	1962	
	Narva Ice Hall	1,500	Narva	Narva PSK	1992	
	Nord Sports Hall	1,066	Tallinn	BC Kalev	2002	
	Kuressaare Sports Hall	1,015	Kuressaare	Saaremaa VK	2004	
	Paide E-Piim Sports Hall	1,009	Paide		2009	
	TalTech Sports Hall	1,000	Tallinn	TalTech Basketball, TalTech Volleyball	1975	
	Sadolin Sports Hall	1,000	Rapla	Rapla KK	2010	
	Forus Sports Centre	1,000	Viimsi	KK Viimsi	2018	
	Märjamaa Sports Hall	920	Märjamaa		2020	
	Jõhvi Sports Hall	800	Jõhvi		2009	
	Põlva Mesikäpa Hall	742	Põlva	Põlva Serviti	2003	
	Viljandi Sports Hall	680	Viljandi	Viljandi HC	1959	
	Hiiumaa Sports Centre	678	Kärdla		2021	
	Lõunakeskus Ice Hall	600	Tartu	Tartu Välk 494	2005	
	Narva Sport Centre	600	Narva		2005	
	Võru Sports Centre	600	Võru	Võru VK	2006	
	Wiedemann Sports Hall	600	Haapsalu		2001	
	Valga Sports Hall	561	Valga	BC Valga	2005	
	Kehra Sports Hall	550	Kehra	HC Kehra	2004	
	Lasnamäe Indoor Arena	510	Tallinn		2002	
	Audentes Sports Centre	500	Tallinn	Audentes/Noortekoondis; VK Selver Tallinn	2003	
	Škoda Ice Hall	500	Tallinn	Tallinn HC Panter	2002	
	Kohila Sports Centre	300	Kohila		2004	
	Põltsamaa Felixhall	250	Põltsamaa		2005	
	Tapa Sports Centre	240	Tapa	SK Tapa	2002	
	Kadaka Sports Hall	140	Tallinn		1993	
	Torma Sports Hall	100	Torma		2006	
	Aura Center		Tartu			
	Jeti Ice Hall		Tallinn		2000	
	Kalev Spa Water Park		Tallinn			
	Keila Health Centre		Keila	Keila Basket; Keila KK		
	Sõle Sports Centre		Tallinn		2017	
	Tallinn Sports Hall		Tallinn		1996	
	Viljandi Ice Hall		Viljandi		2007	
	Pärnu kesklinna koolide võimla		Pärnu			
	Otepää Sports Hall		Otepää			
	Wiru Sports Centre		Kohtla-Järve		2021	

== Proposed arenas ==
Arena	Capacity	City	Refs.
New National Sports Arena	10,000–15,000	Pärnu, Tallinn or Tartu	

== See also ==
- List of indoor arenas in Europe
- List of indoor arenas by capacity
