= 2021–22 EML season =

Estonian national championships in ice hockey

- League: Meistriliiga
- Sport: Ice hockey
- Duration: 25 September 2021 – 23 April 2022
- Number of teams: 7

Championship
- Season champions: Välk 494

Cup
- Champions: Välk 494 (13th title)
- Runners-up: HK Kurbads

Meistriliiga seasons
- ← 2020–21 2022–23 →

The 2021–22 EML season (also known as the Coolbet Hokiliiga for sponsorship reasons) was the 82nd season of the Meistriliiga, the top level of ice hockey in Estonia. The season began on 25 September 2021.

== Teams ==
Team	City	Arena	Capacity
HC Everest	Kohtla-Järve	Kohtla-Järve Ice Hall	700
(Latvia) HK Kurbads	Riga	Kurbads Ledus Halle	1,500
Narva PSK	Narva	Narva Ice Hall	1,500
HC Panter	Tallinn	Škoda Ice Arena	500
Välk 494	Tartu	Lõunakeskus Ice Hall	600
Viru Sputnik	Kohtla-Järve	Kohtla-Järve Ice Hall	700
Vipers	Tallinn	Tondiraba Ice Hall	5,840

== Regular season ==
=== League table ===
Pos	Team	Pld	W	OTW	OTL	L	GF	GA	GD	Pts	Qualification
1	Välk 494	24	20	1	1	2	172	83	+89	43	Qualification to play-offs
2	HK Kurbads	24	17	0	2	5	143	78	+65	36	Qualification to play-offs
3	HC Everest	24	16	0	0	8	139	81	+58	32	Qualification to play-offs
4	HC Panter	24	13	1	1	9	103	90	+13	29	Qualification to play-offs
5	HC Vipers	24	7	2	0	15	104	131	−27	18	
6	Narva PSK	24	4	1	1	18	97	173	−76	11	
7	Viru Sputnik	24	1	1	1	21	57	179	−122	5	

Source: Estonian Ice Hockey Association
Rules for classification: 1) points; 2) head-to-head points; 3) head-to-head goal difference; 4) head-to-head number of goals scored; 5) result against closest best-ranked team outside tied teams; 6) result against second-best ranked team outside tied teams; 7) seeding before tournament.

=== Results ===
Home	Away						
Home	HC Panter	Välk 494	Kurbads	HC Vipers	V. Sputnik	HC Everest	Narva PSK
HC Panter	–	1–4; 3–6	5–2; 2–4	4–2; 5–1	3–2 OT; 5–0	3–5; 5–2	7–3; 10–5
Välk 494	12–3; 7–2	–	6–3; 3–2 GWS	10–3; 10–2	10–1; 13–5	8–5; 4–3	13–5; 8–1
HK Kurbads	4–2; 5–2	6–3; 8–4	–	3–4 GWS; 5–1	8–4; 12–3	2–6; 4–6	7–5; 12–2
HC Vipers	2–8; 2–5	6–5 OT; 4–7	2–5; 4–7	–	12–3; 12–6	9–5; 0–5	12–6; 1–4
Viru Sputnik	4–7; 0–5 WO	1–4; 3–5	0–13; 1–6	4–5; 0–5 WO	–	3–7; 0–5 WO	2–12; 1–5
HC Everest	1–5; 10–3	5–7; 2–6	2–7; 3–2	9–2; 5–0	12–4; 5–0	–	10–2; 12–0
Narva PSK	3–5; 4–3 OT	5–8; 4–9	4–9; 4–7	3–10; 7–3	5–6; 3–4 GWS	3–5; 2–9	–
OT - Overtime. GWS - Shootout. WO - Walkover.

== Play-offs ==
Semi-finals
1	Välk 494	2
4	HC Panter	0
2	HK Kurbads	2
3	HC Everest	1

Finals
1	Välk 494	3
2	HK Kurbads	0
Third place
3	HC Everest	0
4	HC Panter	1

=== Semi-finals ===
Välk 494 – HC Panter 2-0
26.03.2022	Välk 494	HC Panter	7-2
27.03.2022	HC Panter	Välk 494	1-6
Välk 494 won the series 2–0.

HK Kurbads – HC Everest 2-1
26.03.2022	HK Kurbads	HC Everest	5-4
27.03.2022	HC Everest	HK Kurbads	1-5
02.04.2022	HK Kurbads	HC Everest	2-1
Kurbads won the series 2–1.

=== Third place ===
17 April 2022	HC Everest	1–2 (0–0, 1–2, 0–0)	HC Panter

=== Finals ===
Välk 494 – HK Kurbads 3–0
06.04.2022	HK Kurbads	Välk 494	2-4
16.04.2022	Välk 494	HK Kurbads	4-2
23.04.2022	Välk 494	HK Kurbads	3-1
Välk 494 won the series 3–0.

== Final rankings ==
Gold medal	Välk 494
Silver medal	Kurbads
Bronze medal	Panter
4	Everest
5	Vipers
6	Narva PSK
7	Viru Sputnik
