= 2015–16 Meistriliiga (ice hockey) season =

Estonian national championships in ice hockey

2015–16 Meistriliiga
- League: Meistriliiga
- Sport: Ice hockey
- Duration: 10 October 2015 – 19 March 2016
- Teams: 4
- Season champions: Narva PSK
- Top scorer: Aleksandr Bogdanov (PSK)

Meistriliiga seasons
- ← 2014–15 2016–17 →

The 2015–16 Meistriliiga season was the 76th season of the Meistriliiga, the top level of ice hockey in Estonia, since the league's formation in 1934. The season started on 10 October 2015 and concluded on 19 March 2016. On 27 February 2016, Narva PSK won the title with three games to spare after a 5–1 home win over Kohtla-Järve Viru Sputnik. It was their first league title since 2001 and their 17th Estonian league title overall.

== Teams ==
Team	City	Arena	Capacity
HC Panter	Tallinn	Škoda Ice Hall	5,840
PSK	Narva	Narva Ice Hall	1,500
Viru Sputnik	Kohtla-Järve	Kohtla-Järve Ice Hall	2,000

== Results ==
=== League table ===
Pos	Team	Pld	W	OTW	OTL	L	GF	GA	GD	Pts
1	Narva PSK (C)	14	11	1	0	2	65	35	+30	35
2	Tallinn HC Panter	14	5	0	2	7	57	53	+4	17
3	Kohtla-Järve Viru Sputnik	14	5	1	0	8	52	64	−12	17
4	Estonia Junior Team (Note: Estonia U20 team joined the league for one away round as a part of their training program for the 2016 World Junior Ice Hockey Championships, while Estonia U18 team joined the league for one away round as a part of their training program for the 2016 IIHF World U18 Championships. The Estonia Junior Team is ineligible to compete for the league title.)	6	1	0	0	5	24	46	−22	3

First match(es) will be played: 23 April 2016. Source: Estonian Ice Hockey Association
Rules for classification: 1) points; 2) head-to-head points; 3) head-to-head goal difference; 4) head-to-head number of goals scored; 5) result against closest best-ranked team outside tied teams; 6) result against second-best ranked team outside tied teams; 7) seeding before tournament.
(C) Champion
