= 2014–15 Meistriliiga (ice hockey) season =

Estonian national championships in ice hockey

2014–15 Meistriliiga
- League: Meistriliiga
- Sport: Ice hockey
- Duration: 4 October 2014 – 29 March 2015
- Number of teams: 5

Regular season
- Season champions: Tallinn HC Viking (stripped)
- Runners-up: Tartu Kalev-Välk
- Top scorer: Aleksandr Bogdanov (PSK)

Playoffs
- Champions: Tartu Kalev-Välk
- Runners-up: Narva PSK

Meistriliiga seasons
- ← 2013–14 2015–16 →

The 2014–15 Meistriliiga season was the 75th season of the Meistriliiga, the top level of ice hockey in Estonia, since the league's formation in 1934. The title was won by Tartu Kalev-Välk who defeated Narva PSK in the finals.

== Teams ==
Team	City	Arena	Capacity
HC Panter	Tallinn	Škoda Ice Hall	5,840
HC Viking	Tallinn	Tondiraba Ice Hall	500
Kalev-Välk	Tartu	Lõunakeskus	600
PSK	Narva	Narva Ice Hall	1,500
Viru Sputnik	Kohtla-Järve	Kohtla-Järve Ice Hall	2,000

== Regular season ==
R	Team	GP	W	L	OTL	OTW	GF	GA	Pts
1	Tallinn HC Viking^{[a]}	16	14	0	1	1	87	37	43
2	Tartu Kalev-Välk	16	8	1	1	6	83	55	27
3	Narva PSK	16	7	2	0	7	78	79	25
4	Tallinn HC Panter	16	5	0	1	10	51	79	16
5	Kohtla-Järve Viru Sputnik	16	2	1	1	12	55	115	9

Despite finishing the regular season first, Tallinn HC Viking were stripped of their playoffs spot due to unpaid debts.

== Playoffs ==
Semifinals
1	Tartu Kalev-Välk	2
4	Kohtla-Järve Viru Sputnik	0
2	Narva PSK	2
3	Tallinn HC Panter	1

Finals
1	Tartu Kalev-Välk	2
2	Narva PSK	0
