= 2000 North European Basketball League =

Season of the North European Basketball League

North European Basketball League
- Season: 2000
- Teams: 14

NEBL'2000 was the first complete season of the North European Basketball League. The tournament was held during the 1999-2000 basketball season on 5 January – 16 April 2000.

After holding Promotion Cup, teams from four more countries – Germany, Russia, Ukraine and Denmark – took part in NEBL'2000.

League accepted the participation of Magic M7 from Sweden, with which Earvin "Magic" Johnson entered into an agreement.

CSKA won the tournament by defeating Lietuvos rytas in the final.

Andrius Giedraitis from Lietuvos rytas was named as the Most valuable player.

== Clubs ==
Country (League)	Teams
Denmark (Basketligaen)	Great Danes Copenhagen
Estonia (KML)	Kalev Tallinn
Finland (Korisliiga)	TeamWARE ToPo Helsinki
Finland (Korisliiga)	Honka Espoo
Germany (BBL)	Skyliners Frankfurt
Latvia (LBL)	Ventspils
Latvia (LBL)	Brocēni-LMT Rīga
Lithuania (LKL)	Lietuvos rytas Vilnius
Lithuania (LKL)	Žalgiris Kaunas
Lithuania (LKL)	Alita Alytus
Russia (Super League A)	CSKA Moscow
Sweden (Basketligan)	Magic M7 Borås
Sweden (Basketligan)	Plannja Basket Luleå
Ukraine (SuperLeague)	Kyiv Kiev

== Regular season ==
Key to colors
Teams advance to Final Four.
Teams advance to eight-finals.

	Team	Pld	W	L	PF	PA	Diff	Tie-break
1.	(Russia) CSKA	13	12	1	1239	953	+286	
2.	(Lithuania) Lietuvos rytas	13	11	2	1172	1032	+140	1–0
3.	(Lithuania) Žalgiris	13	11	2	1386	1086	+300	0–1
4.	(Ukraine) Kyiv	13	9	4	1384	1236	+148	
5.	(Estonia) Kalev	13	7	6	1301	1288	+13	1–0
6.	(Sweden) Magic M7	13	7	6	1257	1329	–72	0–1
7.	(Latvia) Ventspils	13	6	7	1246	1193	+53	
8.	(Sweden) Plannja Basket	13	5	8	1158	1257	–99	3–0
9.	(Finland) TeamWARE ToPo	13	5	8	1146	1321	–175	2–1
10.	(Finland) Honka	13	5	8	1185	1300	–115	1–2
11.	(Latvia) Brocēni-LMT	13	5	8	1055	1124	–69	0–3
12.	(Germany) Skyliners	13	4	9	922	1002	–80	
13.	(Lithuania) Alita	13	3	10	1054	1147	–93	
14.	(Denmark) Great Danes	13	1	12	859	1096	–237	

== Results ==
	(Denmark) MGD	(Lithuania) ALI	(Germany) SKY	(Latvia) LMT	(Finland) HON	(Finland) TOP	(Sweden) PLA	(Latvia) VEN	(Sweden) MM7	(Estonia) KAL	(Ukraine) KYI	(Lithuania) ŽAL	(Lithuania) LRY
(Russia) CSKA Moscow	112-82	90-62	79-67	108-81	94-91	108-68	106-57	104-84	86-88	107-82	89-77	60-57	96-77
(Lithuania) Lietuvos rytas	74-62	92-75	85-64	94-85	89-77	106-74	79-63	103-84	78-84	95-80	93-87	107-101	
(Lithuania) Žalgiris Kaunas	91-58	109-78	74-73	99-74	106-70	96-80	99-56	91-63	106-81	96-61	108-80		
(Ukraine) Kyiv	90-73	111-100	93-84	97-77	89-75	95-78	100-85	75-58	95-92	85-95			
(Estonia) Kalev	86-64	86-85	73-82	75-89	86-89	86-77	102-87	90-88	101-82				
(Sweden) Magic M7	85-71	89-79	86-72	88-97	93-97	74-73	93-84	76-89					
(Latvia) Ventspils	81-63	98-80	73-75	74-79	97-73	83-73	75-65						
(Sweden) Plannja Basket	61-63	96-76	83-72	77-71	101-63	79-60							
(Finland) TeamWARE ToPo Helsinki	85-83	93-81	72-66	93-88	91-86								
(Finland) Honka Playboys	90-69	62-92	75-59	92-81									
(Latvia) Brocēni-LMT	85-75	90-83	58-69										
(Germany) Skyliners	76-68	63-83											
(Lithuania) Alita	80-68												

Source: Worldbasket.com

== Play-offs ==
=== Eight-finals ===
Team 1	Agg.	Team 2	1st leg	2nd leg
Žalgiris (Lithuania)	153–145	(Finland) Honka	80–84	73–61
Kyiv (Ukraine)	210–129	(Finland) TeamWARE ToPo	104–78	106–51
Kalev (Estonia)	198–164	(Sweden) Plannja Basket	104–91	94–73
Magic M7 (Sweden)	146–201	(Latvia) Ventspils	65–92	81–109

=== Quarterfinals ===
Team 1	Agg.	Team 2	1st leg	2nd leg
Žalgiris (Lithuania)	157–140	(Latvia) Ventspils	76–69	81–71
Kyiv (Ukraine)	198–180	(Estonia) Kalev	95–95	103–85

== Final four ==
=== Semifinal 1 ===
15 April 2000
17:00

CSKA (Russia)	105–88	(Ukraine) Kyiv
Scoring by quarter: 24–29, 28–20, 28–15, 25–24
Pts: Panov 23		Pts: C.McCants 21

Vilnius Sports Palace, Vilnius
Attendance: 3,000
Referees: Romualdas Brazauskas (LTU), Richard Stokes (ENG)

=== Semifinal 2 ===
15 April 2000
19:00

Lietuvos rytas (Lithuania)	74–67	(Lithuania) Žalgiris
Scoring by quarter: 20–16, 18–13, 21–15, 15–23
Pts: Elliott 19		Pts: M.Žukauskas 17

Vilnius Sports Palace, Vilnius
Attendance: 3,500
Referees: Mikhail Davydov (RUS), Efim Resser (GER)

=== Third-place game ===
16 April 2000
17:00

Kyiv (Ukraine)	88–110	(Lithuania) Žalgiris
Scoring by quarter: 14–20, 22–29, 27–28, 25–33
Pts: Medvedenko 21		Pts: Slanina 22

Vilnius Sports Palace, Vilnius
Attendance: 3,500
Referees: Mikhail Davydov (RUS), Efim Resser (GER)

=== Final ===
16 April 2000
19:00

Lietuvos rytas (Lithuania)	77–95	(Russia) CSKA
Scoring by quarter: 18–24, 18–30, 28–19, 13–22
Pts: Giedraitis 25		Pts: Daineko 32

Vilnius Sports Palace, Vilnius
Attendance: 4,500
Referees: Volodymyr Drabikovskyi (UKR), Richard Stokes (ENG)

== Final standings ==
Pos	Team
1.	CSKA
2.	Lietuvos rytas
3.	Žalgiris
4.	Kyiv
5.	Kalev
6.	Ventspils
7.	Magic M7
8.	Plannja Basket
9.	TeamWARE ToPo
10.	Honka
11.	Brocēni-LMT
12.	Skyliners
13.	Alita
14.	Great Danes
