= Roman Derlyuk =

Russian ice hockey player (born 1986)

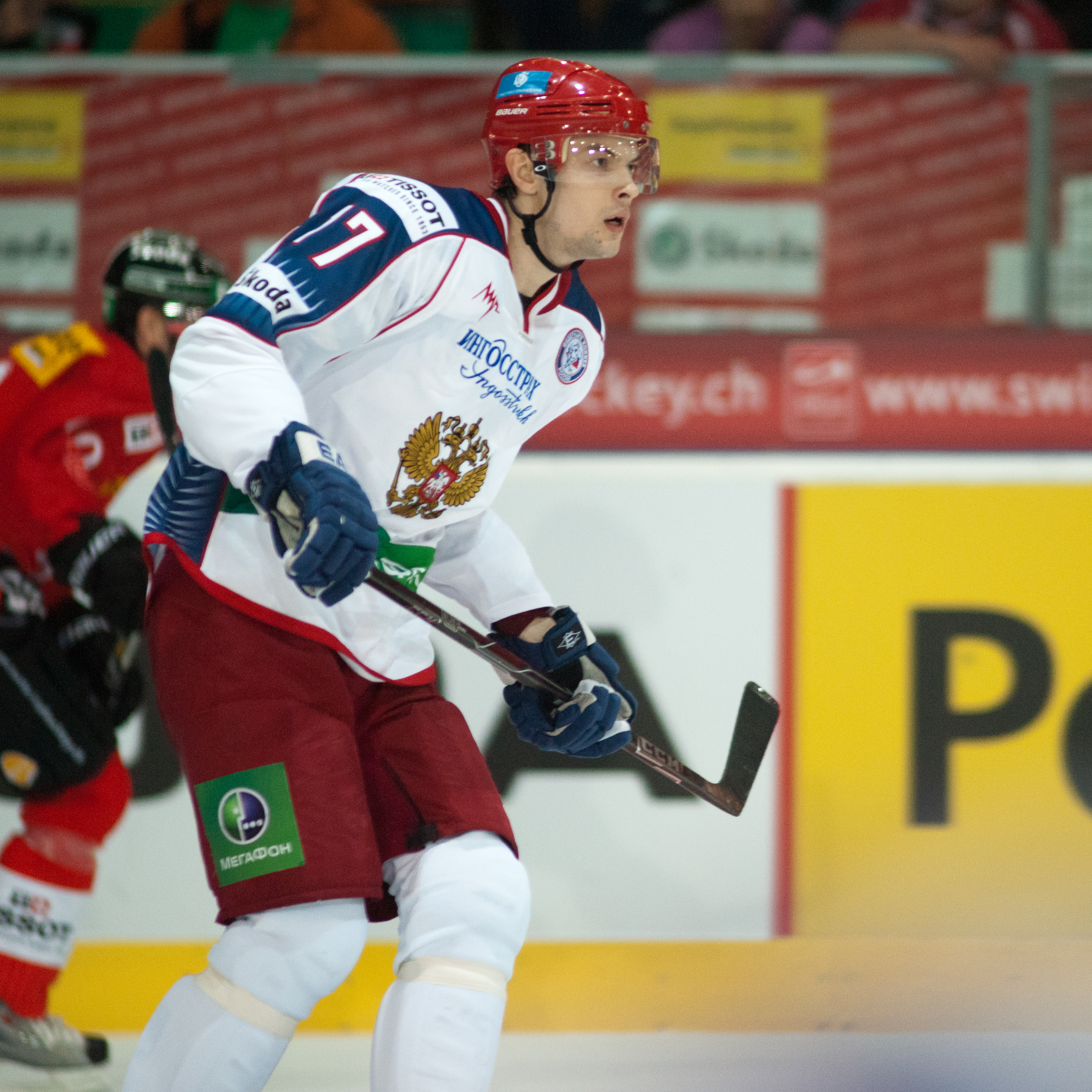
- Born: October 27, 1986 (age 39) Leningrad, USSR
- Height: 6 ft 3 in (191 cm)
- Weight: 198 lb (90 kg; 14 st 2 lb)
- Position: Defence
- Shoots: Left
- team Former teams: Free agent SKA St. Petersburg; HC MVD; HC Dynamo Moscow; San Antonio Rampage; Salavat Yulaev Ufa; HC Sochi; Torpedo Nizhny Novgorod
- NHL draft: 164th overall, 2005; Florida Panthers
- Playing career: 2005–present

Roman Derlyuk (born October 27, 1986) is a Russian professional ice hockey defenceman. He is currently a free agent having last played for HC Košice of the Slovak Extraliga. He was selected by Florida Panthers in the 6th round (164th overall) of the 2005 NHL entry draft.

== Playing career ==
Prior to coming to North America, Derlyuk played six seasons in the Russian major leagues. On June 1, 2011 the Florida Panthers announced that Derlyuk had agreed to a one-year, entry-level deal with the National Hockey League team. In the 2011–12 season, Derlyuk failed to make the Panthers roster and was assigned to American Hockey League affiliate, the San Antonio Rampage for the duration of the campaign.

Derlyuk returned to Russian club, HC Dynamo Moscow the following year. On October 29, 2014, Derlyuk was traded by Dynamo to HC Sochi for cash considerations.

== Career statistics ==
			Regular season					Playoffs
Season	Team	League	GP	G	A	Pts	PIM	GP	G	A	Pts	PIM
2001–02	Izhorets St. Petersburg	RUS.3	17	0	0	0	8	—	—	—	—	—
2002–03	Izhorets St. Petersburg	RUS.3	19	0	0	0	16	—	—	—	—	—
2003–04	Lokomotiv St. Petersburg	RUS.3	56	2	7	9	92	—	—	—	—	—
2004–05	Spartak St. Petersburg	RUS.2	51	0	3	3	74	—	—	—	—	—
2005–06	SKA St. Petersburg	RSL	32	0	3	3	63	2	1	0	1	0
2005–06	SKA–2 St. Petersburg	RUS.3	9	1	5	6	6	—	—	—	—	—
2006–07	SKA St. Petersburg	RSL	6	0	1	1	4	—	—	—	—	—
2006–07	SKA–2 St. Petersburg	RUS.3	6	1	4	5	6	—	—	—	—	—
2006–07	HC MVD	RSL	19	0	3	3	14	—	—	—	—	—
2006–07	HC–2 MVD	RUS.4	2	0	2	2	0	—	—	—	—	—
2007–08	HC MVD	RSL	26	3	3	6	26	3	0	0	0	2
2007–08	HC–2 MVD	RUS.3	24	1	5	6	36	—	—	—	—	—
2008–09	HC MVD	KHL	54	3	8	11	50	—	—	—	—	—
2009–10	THK Tver	RUS.2	2	0	0	0	25	—	—	—	—	—
2009–10	HC MVD	KHL	25	2	7	9	34	15	1	3	4	16
2010–11	Dynamo Moscow	KHL	44	5	9	14	18	6	0	2	2	8
2011–12	San Antonio Rampage	AHL	69	2	9	11	31	10	1	0	1	6
2012–13	Dynamo Moscow	KHL	27	2	2	4	10	11	2	0	2	4
2012–13	Dynamo Balashikha	VHL	2	0	0	0	0	—	—	—	—	—
2013–14	Dynamo Moscow	KHL	31	1	3	4	41	1	0	0	0	2
2014–15	Dynamo Moscow	KHL	9	0	1	1	2	—	—	—	—	—
2014–15	HC Sochi	KHL	40	1	8	9	13	4	0	0	0	6
2015–16	Salavat Yulaev Ufa	KHL	43	1	2	3	32	2	0	0	0	2
2016–17	HC Sochi	KHL	11	0	0	0	12	—	—	—	—	—
2016–17	Torpedo Nizhny Novgorod	KHL	3	0	0	0	0	1	0	0	0	0
2017–18	Neman Grodno	BLR	26	1	9	10	12	15	1	2	3	14
2018–19	Neman Grodno	BLR	39	2	10	12	40	—	—	—	—	—
2018–19	HC Košice	SVK	8	1	3	4	2	6	0	1	1	8
2021–22	HC Vipers Tallinn	EST	7	2	6	8	2	—	—	—	—	—
RSL totals			83	3	10	13	107	6	1	0	1	2
KHL totals			287	15	40	55	212	40	3	5	8	38
