= 2013–14 KML season =

Estonian national championships in basketball

Alexela Korvpalli Meistriliiga^{1}
- Season: 2013–14
- Duration: 27 September 2013 – 21 May 2014
- Games played: 130 (Regular season); 26 (Playoffs)
- Teams: 9
- TV partner(s): TV6, Delfi TV

Regular season
- Top seed: TÜ/Rock
- Season MVP: (Romania) Vlad Moldoveanu

Finals
- Champions: Kalev/Cramo; 7th title
- Runners-up: TÜ/Rock
- Third place: Rakvere Tarvas
- Fourth place: Tallinna Kalev
- Finals MVP: (Romania) Vlad Moldoveanu

Awards
- Best Defender: (Estonia) Gregor Arbet
- Best Young Player: (Estonia) Sander Saare
- Coach of the Year: (Estonia) Alar Varrak

Statistical leaders
Points	(United States) Joe Prophet	19.33
Rebounds	(United States) Frank Elegar	8.77
Assists	(Lithuania) Giedrius Gustas	4.59
- All statistics correct as of 13 September 2014.^{1} Sponsored league name, referring to Alexela.

The 2013–14 Alexela Korvpalli Meistriliiga was the 89th season of the Estonian basketball league and the first under the title sponsorship of Alexela. Kalev/Cramo came into the season as defending champions of the 2012–13 KML season.

The season started on 27 September 2013 and concluded on 21 May 2014 with Kalev/Cramo defeating TÜ/Rock 4 games to 0 in the 2014 KML Finals to win their 7th Estonian League title.

== Teams ==
Locations of the 2013–14 Alexela Korvpalli Meistriliiga teams

Team	Location	Arena	Capacity	Head coach
Kalev/Cramo	Tallinn	Saku Arena	7,500	(Estonia) Alar Varrak
TÜ/Rock	Tartu	University of Tartu Sports Hall	4,000	(Estonia) Gert Kullamäe
Rakvere Tarvas	Rakvere	Rakvere Sports Hall	3,000	(Estonia) Andres Sõber
TYCO Rapla	Rapla	Sadolin Sports Hall	5,000	(Estonia) Aivar Kuusmaa
TTÜ	Tallinn	TTÜ Sports Hall	2,000	(Estonia) Tiit Sokk
Valga/Maks & Moorits	Valga	Valga Sports Hall	2,000	(Latvia) Sandis Buškevics
Pärnu	Pärnu	Pärnu Sports Hall	2,000	(Serbia) Darko Ivanović
Tallinna Kalev	Tallinn	Kalev Sports Hall	6,950	(Estonia) Kalle Klandorf
HITO	Jõhvi	Jõhvi Sports Hall	500	(Estonia) Priit Sternhof

=== Coaching changes ===
Pre-season
Team	Outgoing coach	Incoming coach
Pärnu	(Estonia) Priit Vene	(Serbia) Darko Ivanović
In-season
Team	Outgoing coach	Incoming coach
TYCO Rapla	(Estonia) Indrek Ruut	(Estonia) Aivar Kuusmaa

== Regular season ==
During the regular season teams will play 4 rounds for 32 games (2 at home and 2 away) with following exceptions:

- Kalev/Cramo will play 1 round at home against teams other than TÜ/Rock (1 round at home and 2 rounds away in total).
- TÜ/Rock will play 1 round at home against teams other than Kalev/Cramo (1 round at home and 2 rounds away in total).

Double points will be awarded to teams winning those games.

=== League table ===
Pos	Team	Pld	W	L	Pts	PCT	Qualification
1	TÜ/Rock	32	30	2	62	.938	Qualification to Playoffs
2	Kalev/Cramo	32	29	3	61	.906	Qualification to Playoffs
3	Rakvere Tarvas	32	23	9	55	.719	Qualification to Playoffs
4	TTÜ	32	16	16	48	.500	Qualification to Playoffs
5	Tallinna Kalev	32	14	18	46	.438	Qualification to Playoffs
6	Pärnu	32	14	18	46	.438	Qualification to Playoffs
7	TYCO Rapla	32	10	22	42	.313	Qualification to Playoffs
8	Valga/Maks & Moorits	32	6	26	38	.188	Qualification to Playoffs
9	HITO	32	2	30	34	.063	

Updated to match(es) played on 8 April 2014. Source: KML (2013/2014)

=== First half of the season ===
Home \ Away	KAL	ROC	TAR	RAP	TTÜ	VAL	PÄR	TAL	HIT
Kalev/Cramo		68–75	86–60	81–50	78–63	79–62	91–51	92–68	87–67
TÜ/Rock	75–78		77–58	77–62	101–66	101–56	78–50	60–40	118–90
Rakvere Tarvas	83–73	67–90		81–61	88–76	79–64	97–54	81–59	122–65
TYCO Rapla	61–87	60–71	59–86		68–74	96–61	86–75	73–75	80–67
TTÜ	78–85	40–66	65–90	76–50		67–61	65–59	75–67	83–58
Valga/Maks & Moorits	55–75	60–87	68–84	58–56	63–70		54–69	81–86	85–64
Pärnu	51–68	68–105	63–74	78–72	66–78	64–59		63–58	97–56
Tallinna Kalev	70–79	65–85	64–109	73–69	65–55	50–54	64–55		96–62
HITO	69–86	68–107	102–118	61–83	75–98	55–70	78–82	58–80	

Legend: Blue = home team win; Yellow = draw; Red = away team win.

=== Second half of the season ===
Home \ Away	KAL	ROC	TAR	RAP	TTÜ	VAL	PÄR	TAL	HIT
Kalev/Cramo		87–77							
TÜ/Rock	86–81								
Rakvere Tarvas	79–85	76–96		80–68	81–71	78–70	91–55	101–66	110–79
TYCO Rapla	59–82	69–78	67–66		79–64	79–72	66–74	82–63	107–83
TTÜ	61–80	57–80	56–63	73–64		66–56	58–59	59–58	91–60
Valga/Maks & Moorits	56–83	64–82	60–87	63–68	77–74		57–71	54–71	86–58
Pärnu	46–86	53–73	56–75	74–47	57–85	76–69		78–75	88–63
Tallinna Kalev	53–88	72–84	97–64	75–68	57–63	86–64	70–69		84–54
HITO	65–111	80–105	67–100	79–71	69–73	77–64	73–88	87–97	

Legend: Blue = home team win; Yellow = draw; Red = away team win.

== Playoffs ==
The playoffs began on 16 April and ended on 21 May. The tournament concluded with Kalev/Cramo defeating TÜ/Rock 4 games to 0 in the 2014 KML Finals.

=== Bracket ===
Quarter-finals
1	TÜ/Rock	3
8	Valga/Maks & Moorits	0
4	TTÜ	1
5	Tallinna Kalev	3
2	Kalev/Cramo	3
7	TYCO Rapla	0
3	Rakvere Tarvas	3
6	Pärnu	0

Semi-finals
1	TÜ/Rock	3
5	Tallinna Kalev	0
2	Kalev/Cramo	3
3	Rakvere Tarvas	0

Finals
1	TÜ/Rock	0
2	Kalev/Cramo	4
Third place
3	Rakvere Tarvas	2
5	Tallinna Kalev	1

== Individual statistics ==
Players qualify to this category by having at least 50% games played.

=== Points ===
Rank	Player	Team	Games	Points	PPG
1	(United States) Joe Prophet	HITO	15	290	19.33
2	(Ghana) Asenso Ampim	Tallinna Kalev	26	389	14.96
3	(Estonia) Siim Laur	HITO	29	426	14.69
4	(Lithuania) Giedrius Gustas	Rakvere Tarvas	39	540	13.85
5	(Romania) Vlad Moldoveanu	Kalev/Cramo	32	443	13.84

=== Rebounds ===
Rank	Player	Team	Games	Rebounds	RPG
1	(United States) Frank Elegar	Kalev/Cramo	30	263	8.77
2	(Ghana) Asenso Ampim	Tallinna Kalev	26	211	8.12
3	(Serbia) Nemanja Miljković	Pärnu	30	235	7.83
4	(Estonia) Jaan Puidet	TTÜ	30	222	7.40
5	(United States) Ferg Myrick	Valga/Maks & Moorits	20	147	7.35

=== Assists ===
Rank	Player	Team	Games	Assists	APG
1	(Lithuania) Giedrius Gustas	Rakvere Tarvas	39	179	4.59
2	(Estonia) Jaan Puidet	TTÜ	30	133	4.43
3	(Estonia) Erik Keedus	TTÜ	34	145	4.26
4	(Spain) Miguel Ortega	Valga/Maks & Moorits	20	78	3.90
5	(United States) Vincent Simpson	TÜ/Rock	35	133	3.80

== Awards ==
=== MVP ===
- (Romania) Vlad Moldoveanu (Kalev/Cramo)

=== Finals MVP ===
- (Romania) Vlad Moldoveanu (Kalev/Cramo)

=== Best Defender ===
- (Estonia) Gregor Arbet (Kalev/Cramo)

=== Best Young Player ===
- (Estonia) Sander Saare (Rakvere Tarvas)

=== Coach of the Year ===
- (Estonia) Alar Varrak (Kalev/Cramo)

=== All-KML team ===
Pos	Player	Team
PG	(Lithuania) Augustas Pečiukevičius	TÜ/Rock
SG	(Estonia) Rain Veideman	Kalev/Cramo
SF	(Estonia) Tanel Kurbas	TÜ/Rock
PF	(Estonia) Janar Talts	TÜ/Rock
C	(United States) Frank Elegar	Kalev/Cramo

=== Player of the Month ===
Month	Player	Team
October	(Lithuania) Giedrius Gustas	Rakvere Tarvas
November	(Lithuania) Augustas Pečiukevičius	TÜ/Rock
December	(Estonia) Joonas Järveläinen	TTÜ
January	(Lithuania) Vilmantas Dilys	TÜ/Rock
February	(Latvia) Juris Umbraško	Rakvere Tarvas
March	(Estonia) Rait-Riivo Laane	TYCO Rapla
April	(Estonia) Raido Roos	Tallinna Kalev

== See also ==
- 2013–14 Eurocup Basketball
- 2013–14 EuroChallenge
- 2013–14 VTB United League
- 2013–14 Baltic Basketball League
