= 2013–14 Meistriliiga (ice hockey) season =

Estonian national championships in ice hockey

2013–14 Meistriliiga season
- League: Meistriliiga
- Sport: Ice hockey
- Teams: 6
- Champion: Tallinn Viiking Sport

Meistriliiga seasons
- 2012–13 2014–15

The 2013–14 Meistriliiga season was the 24th season of the Meistriliiga, the top level of ice hockey in Estonia. Six teams participated in the league, and Tallinn Viiking Sport won the championship.

== Regular season ==
	Club	GP	W	OTW	OTL	L	GF–GA	Pts
1.	Tallinn Viiking Sport	19	17	2	0	0	211:36	55
2.	Tartu Kalev-Välk	19	14	0	2	3	158:46	44
3.	Narva PSK	20	13	0	0	7	146:70	39
4.	Tallinn HC Panter Purikad	20	7	0	0	13	94:105	21
5.	Kohtla-Järve Viru Sputnik	20	6	0	0	14	90:172	18
6.	Everest Kohtla-Järve	20	0	0	0	20	39:309	0

== Playoffs ==
=== Semifinals ===
- Tallinn Viiking Sport – Tallinn HC Panter Purikad 2:0 (10:1, 13:2)
- Narva PSK – Tartu Kalev-Välk 1:1 (4:5, 3:1)

=== 3rd place game ===
- Narva PSK – Tallinn HC Panter Purikad 2:0 (5:2, 4:3 OT)

=== Final ===
- Tallinn Viiking Sport – Tartu Kalev-Välk 3:0 (4:3, 7:0, 4:3 OT)
