= KK HITO =

Estonian basketball team

Korvpalliklubi HITO
- Leagues: Korvpalli Meistriliiga
- Founded: 1989
- Arena: Jõhvi Sports Hall (capacity: 600)
- Location: Jõhvi, Estonia
- Team colors: Yellow and Blue
- President: (Estonia) Raul Rõõmus
- Head coach: (Estonia) Priit Sternhof
- Championships: none
- Website: Official website

Korvpalliklubi HITO is an Estonian basketball team, based in Jõhvi. The team is currently a member of the Korvpalli Meistriliiga. HITO play their home games at the Jõhvi Sports Hall.

== Players ==
=== Current roster ===
Note: Flags indicate national team eligibility at FIBA-sanctioned events. Players may hold other non-FIBA nationalities not displayed.

KK HITO roster
Players
Coaches

| Pos. | No. | Nat. | Name | Ht. | Wt. | Age |
|---|---|---|---|---|---|---|
| PG | 4 | (United States) | Prophet, Joseph | 1.95 m (6 ft 5 in) | | 36 – 3 August 1988 |
| PG | 5 | (Estonia) | Post, Siim-Markus | 1.82 m (6 ft 0 in) | | 28 – 13 February 1997 |
| SG | 6 | (Estonia) | Laur, Siim | 1.91 m (6 ft 3 in) | | 37 – 21 August 1987 |
| PG | 8 | (Estonia) | Kool, Jarko | 1.89 m (6 ft 2 in) | | 33 – 7 January 1992 |
| SG | 9 | (Estonia) | Roosimägi, Urmet | 1.90 m (6 ft 3 in) | | 29 – 24 June 1995 |
| C | 11 | (Estonia) | Trumm, Edvard | 1.94 m (6 ft 4 in) | | 41 – 27 July 1983 |
| SF | 12 | (Estonia) | Laanemets, Markus | 1.93 m (6 ft 4 in) | | 32 – 21 August 1992 |
| SG | 14 | (Estonia) | Lehismets, Andrus | 1.91 m (6 ft 3 in) | | 33 – 2 April 1991 |
| SF | 15 | (Estonia) | Veedla, Janek | 1.95 m (6 ft 5 in) | | 36 – 20 June 1988 |
| SF | 20 | (Estonia) | Saar, Jalmar-Joosep | 1.90 m (6 ft 3 in) | | 31 – 15 March 1993 |
| PF | 21 | (Estonia) | Uueküla, Tõnis | 2.01 m (6 ft 7 in) | | 36 – 30 August 1988 |
| PF | 23 | (Estonia) | Tambre, Georg | 1.96 m (6 ft 5 in) | | 30 – 15 April 1994 |
| PF | 32 | (Estonia) | Kirsimaa, Mario | 2.06 m (6 ft 9 in) | | 31 – 2 August 1993 |

Head coach

- (Estonia) Priit Sternhof

Assistant coach(es)

- (Estonia) Priit Käen
- (Estonia) Raul Rõõmus

Legend

- (C) Team captain
- Injured

- Roster
Updated: March 9, 2014

=== Depth chart ===
| Pos. | Starting 5 | Bench 1 | Bench 2 | Bench 3 |
|---|---|---|---|---|
| C | Mario Kirsimaa |
| PF | Edvard Trumm | Georg Tambre |
| SF | Tõnis Uueküla | Markus Laanemets |
| SG | Siim Laur | Jalmar-Joosep Saar | Janek Veedla | Urmet Roosimägi |
| PG | Joseph Prophet | Jarko Kool |

== History ==
| Season | KML | Cup | Coach | Roster |
|---|---|---|---|---|
| 2012–13 | 9th | | Priit Sternhof | Aleksis Anijärv, Mario Kirsimaa, Jarko Kool, Markus Laanemets, Siim Laur, Andrus Lehismets, Jalmar-Joosep Saar, Sander Saare, Artur Saariste, Margo Tali, Georg Tambre, Edvard Trumm, Riho Unt, Tõnis Uueküla |
| 2013–14 | 9th | | Priit Sternhof | Jeff Harper, Mario Kirsimaa, Jarko Kool, Markus Laanemets, Siim Laur, Andrus Lehismets, Rasmus Luud, Siim-Markus Post, Joseph Prophet, Erik Raud, Urmet Roosimägi, Jalmar-Joosep Saar, Georg Tambre, Edvard Trumm, Tõnis Uueküla, Janek Veedla |
