= Giedrius Gustas =

Lithuanian basketball player

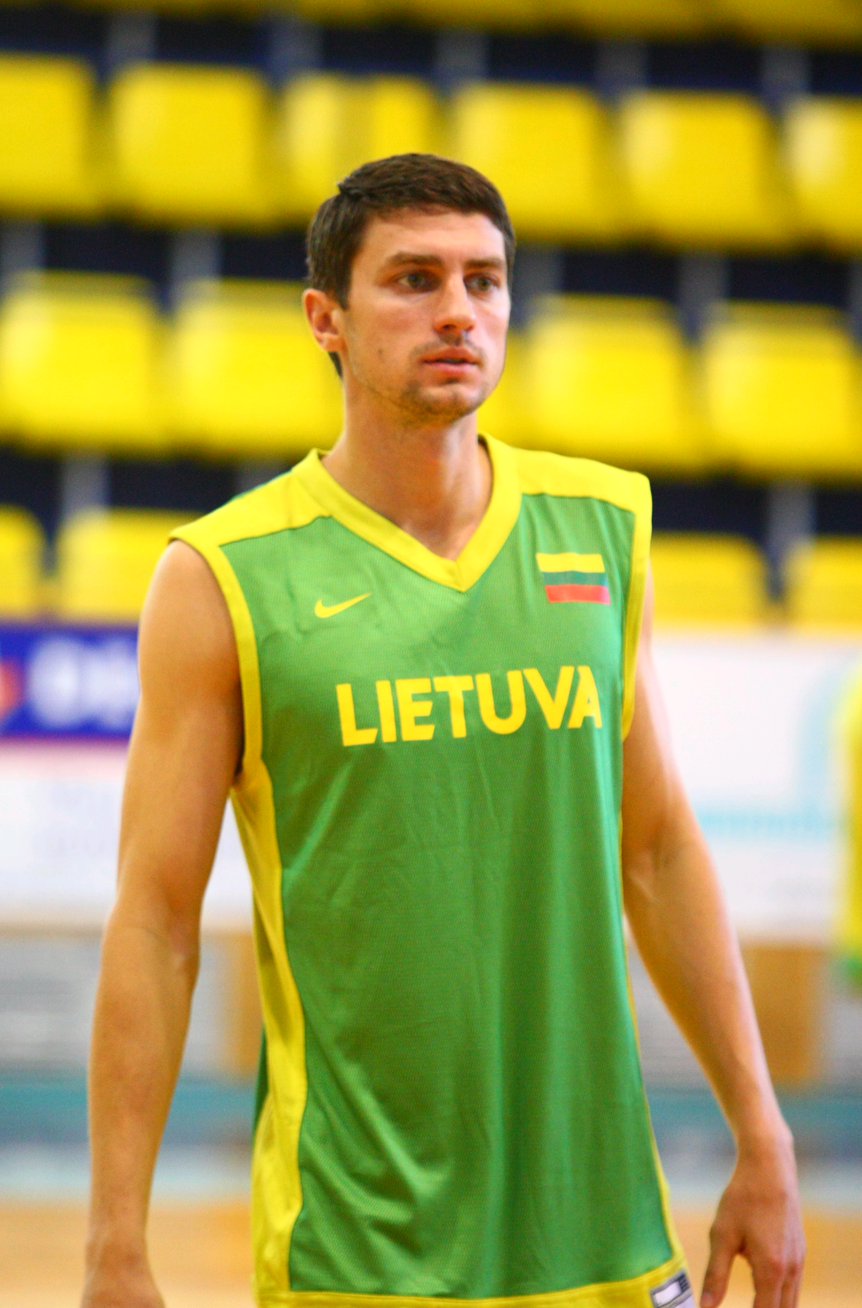
- Gustas playing with the Lithuanian national team.

Personal information
- Born: 4 March 1980 (age 46) Kaunas, Lithuania
- Listed height: 1.90 m (6 ft 3 in)
- Listed weight: 84 kg (185 lb)

Career information
- Playing career: 1998–2016
- Position: Point guard / shooting guard

Career history

Playing
- 1998–2004: Žalgiris Kaunas
- 2004–2005: Lokomotiv Rostov
- 2005–2006: Barons LMT
- 2006–2007: Dynamo Moscow Region
- 2007–2009: Barons LMT
- 2009–2010: Kavala Panorama GS
- 2010–2011: Trefl Sopot
- 2011–2012: Turów Zgorzelec
- 2012–2013: Neptūnas Klaipėda
- 2013–2014: Rakvere Tarvas
- 2014–2016: Dzūkija Alytus

Coaching
- 2016: Dzūkija Alytus (assistant)

Career highlights
- As player: EuroLeague champion (1999); FIBA EuroCup champion (2008); FIBA EuroCup Final Four MVP (2008); NEBL champion (1999); 4× Lithuanian League champion (1999, 2001, 2003–2004); Latvian League champion (2008)
Medals
Men's basketball
Representing Lithuania
EuroBasket
Gold medal – first place	2003 Sweden
Bronze medal – third place	2007 Spain

Giedrius Gustas (born 4 March 1980) is a former Lithuanian professional basketball player. At the height of 1.90 m (6'2 3/4") tall and a weight of 86 kg (190 lbs.), he mainly played at the point guard position. During his club playing career, as a member of Žalgiris Kaunas, he won the EuroLeague championship in 1999. As a member of the Barons LMT, he won the Europe Cup championship in 2008. He was also a member of the senior Lithuanian national team, and with Lithuania, he won the gold medal at the 2003 EuroBasket and the bronze medal at the 2007 EuroBasket.

== Early years and life ==
Giedrius Gustas graduated from the Arvydas Sabonis basketball school. He started his training being at eight with the Lithuanian basketball coach Ramūnas Šalūga. He was a member of the 1980s boys' generation, the first generation to graduate from Sabonis' basketball school. 1996 played for the Lithuanian junior basketball team. 1998 together with R. Javtokas, A. Macijauskas, D. Zavackas, G. Kadžiulis, T. Nagis, played for the Lithuanian youth basketball team. In 1998, Giedrius Gustas graduated from the Kaunas V. Kuprevičiaus (former Kaunas 32) primary school.

== Professional career ==
Giedrius Gustas joined the Lithuanian League club Žalgiris Kaunas, in 1998. With Žalgiris, he won the NEBL championship, the EuroLeague championship, and the Lithuanian League championship in 1999. In 2008, while he was playing with the Latvian League club Barons LMT, he won the FIBA EuroCup championship, and he was also named the league's Final Four MVP.

In 2009, Giedrius Gustas joined the Greek League club EKK Kavala.

== National team career ==
Giedrius Gustas played with the junior national teams of Lithuania. With Lithuania's Under-18 junior national team, he played at the 1998 FIBA Europe Under-18 Championship.

Giedrius Gustas was also a member of the senior Lithuanian national team. With Lithuania, he played at the 2006 FIBA World Championship. He also played at the 2003 EuroBasket, where he won a gold medal, the 2005 EuroBasket, and the 2007 EuroBasket, where he won a bronze medal. With Lithuania, he played in 72 games and scored a total of 298 points.

== Coaching and managerial career ==
On 31 August 2016, Giedrius Gustas announced his retirement as a player, and he became the assistant basketball coach of the Lithuanian League club Dzūkija Alytus. From 2016 to 2017, he worked as the Sports Director of Dzūkija Alytus. In 2018, Giedrius Gustas became a member of the Lithuanian Basketball Federation's board and the Director of the Lithuanian Women's League.

== Personal life ==
In 2017, Giedrius Gustas graduated from Vytautas Magnus University with a Bachelor's degree in Business Administration and Management. Two years later, Giedrius Gustas graduated from the same institution with a Master's degree in Marketing and Sales.

== Career awards and achievements ==
As player

- NEBL champion: 1999
- EuroLeague champion: 1999
- 4× Lithuanian League champion: 1999, 2001, 2003, 2004
- Lithuanian League Runner-up: 2002
- EuroBasket Gold: 2003
- Latvian League Runner-up: 2006
- EuroBasket Bronze: 2007
- FIBA EuroCup champion: 2008
- FIBA EuroCup Final Four MVP: 2008
- Latvian League champion: 2008
- Polish League 3rd place: 2011
- Lithuanian League 3rd place: 2013
- Estonian League 3rd place: 2014
