= 2012–13 Meistriliiga (ice hockey) season =

Estonian national championships in ice hockey

2012–13 Meistriliiga season
- League: Meistriliiga
- Sport: Ice hockey
- Number of teams: 5
- Champion: Tallinn Viiking Sport

Meistriliiga seasons
- ← 2011–12 2013–14 →

The 2012–13 Meistriliiga season was the 23rd season of the Meistriliiga, the top level of ice hockey in Estonia. Five teams participated in the league, and Tallinn Viiking Sport won the championship.

== Regular season ==
| | Club | GP | W | OTW | OTL | L | GF–GA | Pts |
|---|---|---|---|---|---|---|---|---|
| 1. | Tallinn Viiking Sport | 16 | 12 | 1 | 1 | 2 | 126:42 | 39 |
| 2. | Narva PSK | 16 | 11 | 0 | 0 | 5 | 92:79 | 33 |
| 3. | Tartu Kalev-Välk | 16 | 9 | 1 | 1 | 5 | 90:63 | 30 |
| 4. | Tallinn HC Panter Purikad | 16 | 5 | 0 | 0 | 11 | 95:80 | 15 |
| 5. | Kohtla-Järve Viru Sputnik | 16 | 0 | 0 | 0 | 16 | 45:184 | 0 |

== Playoffs ==
=== Semifinals ===
- Tallinn Viiking Sport – Tallinn HC Panter Purikad 3:0 (15:3, 7:1, 5:3)
- Narva PSK – Tartu Kalev-Välk 1:3 (3:8, 3:7, 5:4, 3:9)

=== 3rd place game ===
- Narva PSK – Tallinn HC Panter Purikad 7:4

=== Final ===
- Tallinn Viiking Sport – Tartu Kalev-Välk 3:1 (3:2, 0:2, 4:3, 4:3)
