= Andrei Aleksandrov =

Russian association football player

Personal information
- Full name: Andrei Leonidovich Aleksandrov
- Date of birth: 9 February 1968
- Height: 1.86 m (6 ft 1 in)
- Position: Goalkeeper

Senior career*
Years	Team	Apps	(Gls)
1991	Kirovets Saint Petersburg	0	(0)
1992	Galaks Saint Petersburg	34	(0)
1993	Zenit Saint Petersburg	4	(0)
1994	Prometei-Dynamo Saint Petersburg	24	(0)
1995	Saturn-1991 Saint Petersburg	17	(0)
1995	Metallurg Pikalyovo	4	(0)
1996	Karelia-Erzi Petrozavodsk	6	(0)
1997	Dynamo Saint Petersburg	23	(0)
1998	FC Kondopoga		
1999	Spartak-Orekhovo	7	(0)
2000	Salyut-Energiya Belgorod		
- * Club domestic league appearances and goals

Andrei Leonidovich Aleksandrov (Russian: Андрей Леонидович Александров; born 9 February 1968) is a former Russian football player.

== Club career ==
He played in lower leagues of Russian football, including three seasons in the second-tier Russian Football National League.

Playing for Galaks in 1992 in the away game against FC Volochanin Vyshny Volochyok (1–1) he saved the first three penalty kicks, and when the referee appointed the fourth one he took off his pants and turned to him, for which he was shown a red card.
