= Viljandi Ice Hall =

Ice hall in Viljandi, Estonia

- Viljandi jäähall
- Interactive map of Viljandi Ice Hall
- Address: Puidu 8, Viljandi, 71020 Viljandi maakond, Estonia
- Location: Viljandi, Estonia
- Coordinates: 58°20′58″N 25°34′39″E

Construction
- Opened: 2006

Website
- www.viljandijaahall.ee

Viljandi Ice Hall (Estonian: Viljandi jäähall) is an ice arena in Viljandi, Estonia.

The hall was opened in 2006.

The hall has an ice arena with dimensions of 30 x 60 m.

The hall is used by two ice hockey clubs/teams: Estonia U20 and Viljandi Hokiklubi.
