= Māris Ļaksa =

Latvian basketball player

Māris Ļaksa (born 8 September 1981 in Ventspils) is a retired Latvian professional basketball forward. In 2012, he was a member of BC Rakvere Tarvas. He also played for the Latvia national basketball team. His father, Jānis Ļaksa, is a basketball coach.
