= Janis Vahter =

Estonian basketball player (born 1991)

No. 4 – Tallinna Kalev
- Position: Small forward
- League: Korvpalli Meistriliiga, BBL Challenge Cup

Personal information
- Born: August 22, 1986 (age 40) Kuressaare, Estonia
- Listed height: 6 ft 4 in (1.93 m)
- Listed weight: 205 lb (93 kg)

Career information
- Playing career: 2004–present

Career history
- 2004–2005: Tallinna Kalev
- 2005–2008: Nybit
- 2008–2009: Tallinna Kalev
- 2009–2012: Rakvere Tarvas
- 2012–2013: Tallinna Kalev
- 2013–2015: BC Pärnu
- 2015–present: Tallinna Kalev

Janis Vahter (born 21 January 1991 in Tallinn, Estonia) is an Estonian professional basketball player. He is currently playing for TLÜ/Kalev at the small forward position.

== Club career ==
Janis Vahter started his basketball career with Tallinna Kalev in 2004. He then played 3 seasons with Dalkia/Nybit (last season Triobet/Dalkia). For 2009–2010 season he joined BC Rakvere Tarvas and won his fifth KML medal. He has played for Tarvas for three seasons and has won most of his honours with the team, including being BBL Challenge Cup 2011-12 vice-champion.

== Honours ==
- Korvpalli Meistriliiga
  - Runner-up: 2009–10
  - 3rd place: 2004–05, 2005–06, 2009–10, 2011–12
- Estonian Basketball Cup
  - Runner-up: 2010–11
  - 3rd place: 2011–12
- BBL Challenge Cup
  - Runner-up: 2011–12
