= Paide E-Piim Sports Hall =

Sports venue in Estonia

- Paide E-Piim spordihall
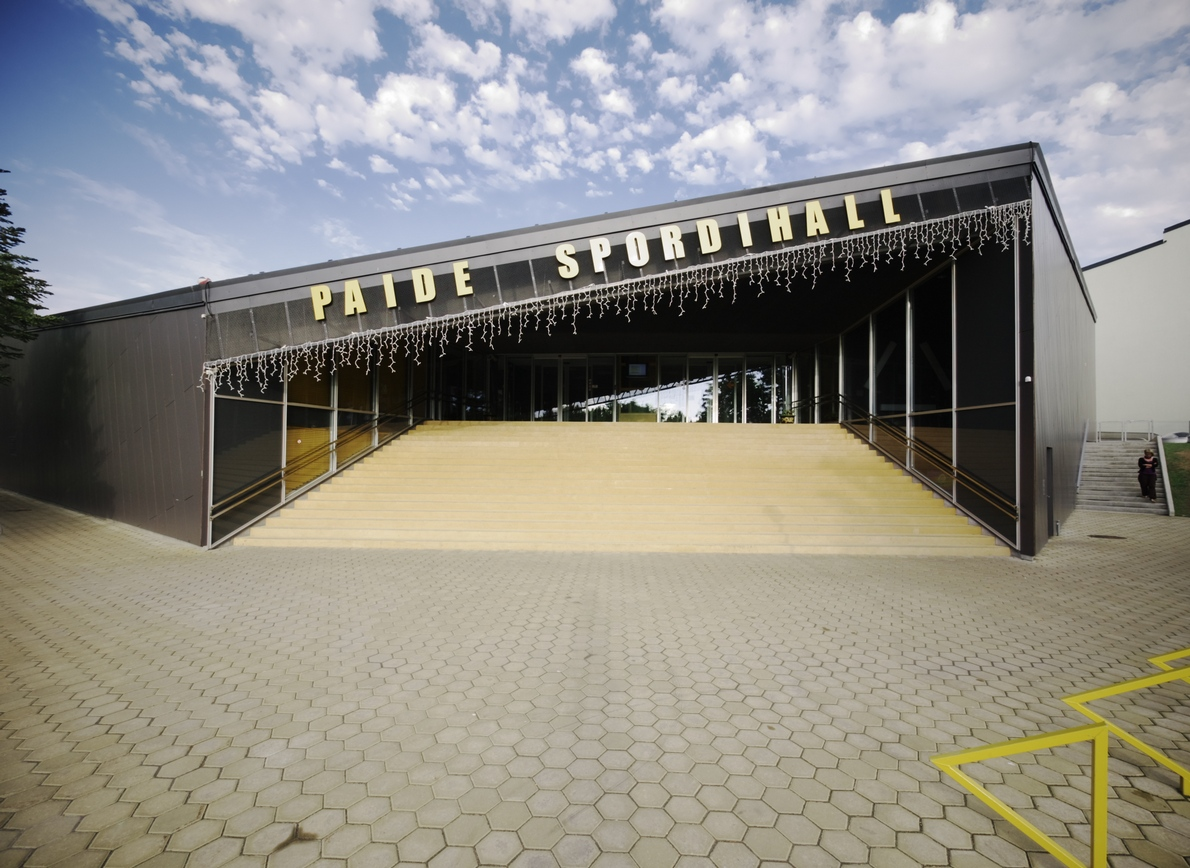
- Paide E-Piim Sports Hall
- Interactive map of Paide E-Piim Sports Hall
- Address: Aiavilja 1, Paide, 72712 Järva maakond, Estonia
- Location: Paide, Estonia
- Coordinates: 58°53′11″N 25°33′53″E

Construction
- Architect: Salto Architects

Website
- www.paidesport.ee/index.php?mid=2

Paide E-Piim Sports Hall (Estonian: Paide E-Piim spordihall) is a sport venue in Paide, Estonia.

The hall was opened on 20 February 2009. On 1 February 2012, the hall was named to E-Piim Sports Hall (Estonian: E-Piim Spordihall).

The hall's capacity is about 800.

The hall has a sport hall with area of 1400 m^{2}.
