= Vlad Moldoveanu =

Romanian basketball player

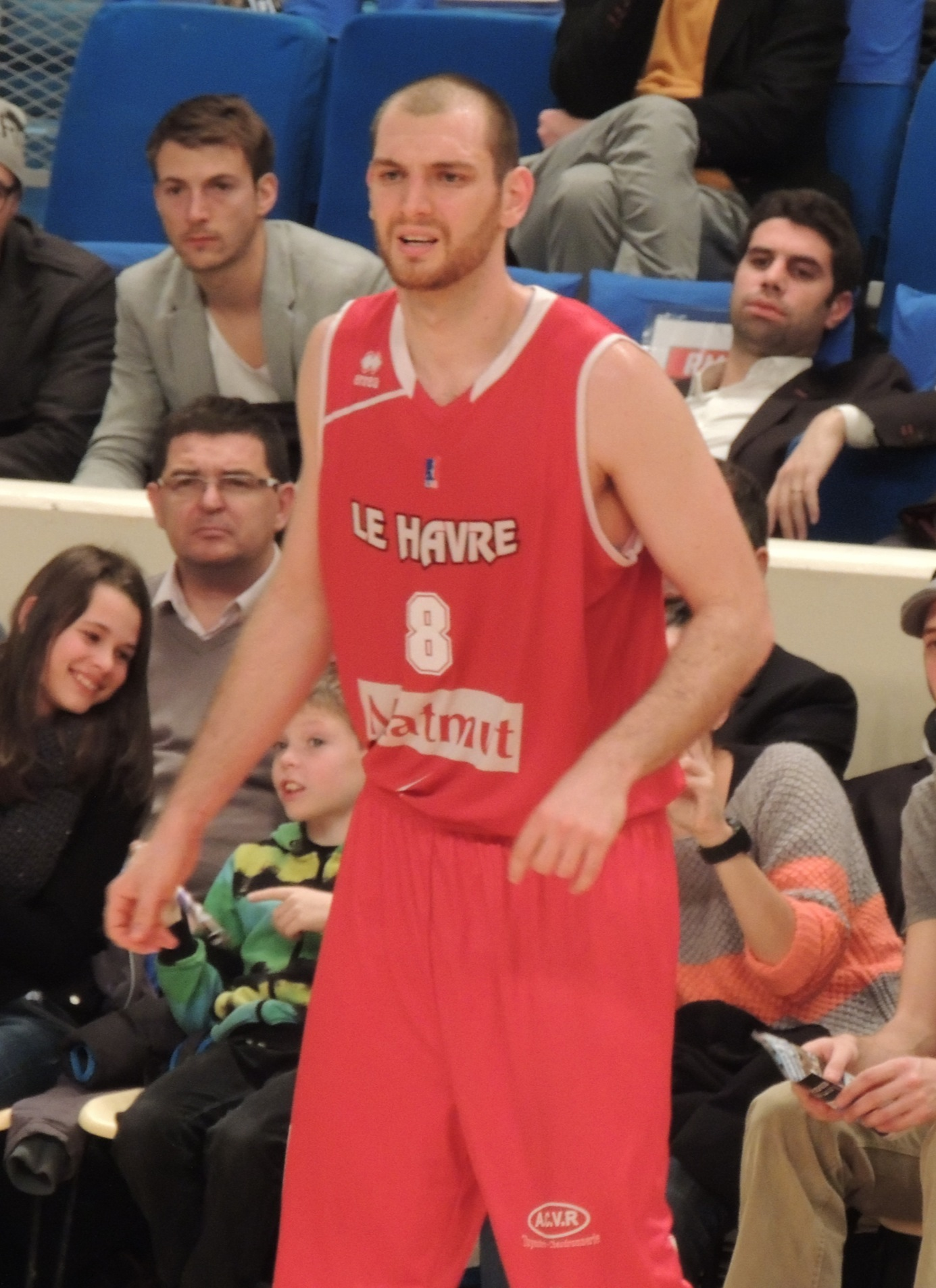
- Moldoveanu with Le Havre in 2012

Personal information
- Born: 11 February 1988 (age 38) Bucharest, Romania
- Listed height: 6 ft 9 in (2.06 m)
- Listed weight: 231 lb (105 kg)

Career information
- High school: St. John's College HS (Washington, D.C.)
- College: George Mason (2007–2009); American (2009–2011)
- NBA draft: 2011: undrafted
- Playing career: 2011–2023
- Position: Power forward

Career history
- 2011–2012: Benetton Treviso
- 2012–2013: Le Havre
- 2013–2014: BC Kalev
- 2014–2015: Turów Zgorzelec
- 2015–2016: Stelmet Zielona Góra
- 2016–2017: U-BT Cluj-Napoca
- 2017–2018: Büyükçekmece
- 2018–2019: U-BT Cluj-Napoca
- 2019–2020: Ifaistos Limnou
- 2020–2022: Voluntari
- 2022–2023: Dinamo București

Career highlights
- Romanian League champion (2017); Polish League champion (2016); Estonian League champion (2014); 3× Romanian Cup winner (2017, 2021, 2022); 2× Romanian Super Cup winner (2015, 2016); 2× Polish Super Cup winner (2015, 2016); 3× Romanian Player of the Year (2012, 2013, 2017); Estonian League Finals MVP (2014); 2× First-team All-Patriot League (2010, 2011)

Vlad-Sorin Moldoveanu (born 11 February 1988) is a Romanian former professional basketball player who last played for Dinamo Bucharest. He also represents the Romanian national basketball team in international competition. Standing at 6 ft 9 in (2.06 m), he played at the power forward position. After finishing his career with Dinamo, Vlad became a FIBA licensed agent and started his own company, VM Hoops Agency.

== Early life ==
Moldoveanu, a 6'9" forward from Bucharest, is the son of former Romanian women's basketball player Carmen Tocală (born 1962).

== College career ==
After earning All-Metropolitan honors at St. John's College High School in Washington, DC, he began playing college basketball at George Mason University, where he played sparingly and averaged 2.3 points and 2.1 rebounds per game over two seasons. He then transferred to American University, where he enjoyed a breakout junior year. Moldoveanu averaged 18.1 points and 6.5 rebounds per game and was named first team All-Patriot League. As a senior in 2010–11, he increased his scoring to 20.1 per game and was again named first team all-conference. In his last year of college, he was also named to the Reese's College All-Star Game and was the Oscar Robertson Player of the Week for the week of 9 January 2011, after averaging 31.5 points and 9.5 rebounds per game during that week.

During his collegiate career, he scored 1,098 points.

== Professional career ==
After going undrafted in the 2011 NBA draft, Moldoveanu signed a contract with the Italian team Benetton Treviso. In his first season as a professional player, he averaged 6.7 points per game in 37 games. For the 2012–13 season, he signed with the French team Le Havre. In 2012 and 2013, he has been named the Romanian Player of the Year. In August 2013, he signed a one-year deal with Kalev/Cramo.

On 18 July 2014 he signed a contract with the Polish team Turów Zgorzelec. On 11 July 2015 he signed with Stelmet Zielona Góra. On 20 June 2016 he signed with U-Banca Transilvania.

On 4 July 2017 Moldoveanu signed with Turkish club Büyükçekmece Basketbol for the 2017–18 season.

On 10 July 2018 Moldoveanu returned to U-BT Cluj-Napoca.

On 2 August 2019 Moldoveanu moved to Greece and signed with Ifaistos Limnou.

== National team career ==
Moldoveanu represents the Romanian national basketball team. He played at the EuroBasket 2017 and was the team's leading scorer and rebounder.

== Awards and accomplishments ==
=== Club ===
Kalev/Cramo

- Korvpalli Meistriliiga: (2014)

Turow Zgorzelec

- Polish Basketball Super Cup : (2015)

Zielona Góra

- Polish Basketball League: (2016)
- Polish Basketball Super Cup : (2016)

U-BT Cluj-Napoca

- Liga Națională: (2017)
- Romanian Cup: (2017)
- 2x Super Cup: (2017,2019)

Voluntari

- 2× Romanian Cup: (2021, 2022)

=== Individual ===
- All-Tournament FIBA Europe Under-18 Championship First Team: 2006
- D.C. All-Metro First Team: 2007
- All-Patriot League First Team: 2010, 2011
- NABC Division I All-District 13 First Team: 2011
- College All-Star Game Participant (Houston, Texas, USA)
- KML Finals MVP: (2014)
- KML Best Foreigner: (2014)
- 3× Romanian League Player of the Year: (2012, 2013, 2017)
- Second Team All-Bosman in PLK: (2016)
- First Team All-Romanian League: (2017)
- Romanian League Forward of the Year: (2017)
