= 1999 NEBL Promotion Cup =

Basketball tournament

North European Basketball League
- Season: 1999
- Teams: 8

NEBL Promotion Cup 1999 was the first test run tournament of the North European Basketball League. The tournament was held during the 1998-99 basketball season on 23 January – 5 April 1999. The tournament included 8 teams from Lithuania, Latvia, Estonia, Sweden and Finland.

BC Žalgiris won the tournament by defeating ASK/Brocēni/LMT in the final. BC Lietuvos rytas finished in third place by defeating Plannja Basket.

The Prize fund for the Final Four competitions equaled $100,000. The winner of the NEBL Promotion Cup was awarded with $45,000 cheque, the other finalist received $25,000, 3rd-place winner - $20,000 and 4th best team got $10,000.

== NEBL Promotion Cup clubs ==
Teams in the 1999 North European Basketball League
Blue: Group A; Red: Group B.

Domestic league positions after playoffs of the previous season shown in parentheses.

Country (League)	Teams
Estonia (KML)	Kalev Tallinn (1st)
Finland (Korisliiga)	TeamWARE ToPo Helsinki (1st)
Latvia (LBL)	ASK Brocēni-LMT Rīga (1st)
Latvia (LBL)	Ventspils (2nd)
Lithuania (LKL)	Žalgiris Kaunas (1st)
Lithuania (LKL)	Lietuvos rytas Vilnius (5th)
Lithuania (LKL)	Alita Alytus (8th)
Sweden (Basketligan)	Plannja Basket Luleå (2nd)

== Group stage ==
During the group stage, each team played 10 games. A team faced opponents in own group twice (6 games) and each team from the other group once (4 games).

Key to colors
Top two teams in each group advance to Final Four.

Group A

	Team	Pld	W	L	PF	PA	Diff	(Latvia) LMT	(Lithuania) LRY	(Finland) TOP	(Lithuania) ALI
1.	(Latvia) ASK Brocēni-LMT	10	8	2	963	903	+60	-	95-80	88-81	101-84
2.	(Lithuania) Lietuvos rytas	10	6	4	934	916	+18	120-116	-	89-88	89-65
3.	(Finland) TeamWARE ToPo	10	4	6	871	889	–18	90-92	89-92	-	91-84
4.	(Lithuania) Alita	10	3	7	807	853	–46	81-93	72-97	82-87	-

Group B

	Team	Pld	W	L	PF	PA	Diff	(Lithuania) ŽAL	(Sweden) PLA	(Latvia) VEN	(Estonia) KAL
1.	(Lithuania) Žalgiris	10	10	0	970	748	+222	-	95-72	92-88	104-71
2.	(Sweden) Plannja Basket	10	6	4	878	897	–19	80-107	-	84 - 77	93-80
3.	(Latvia) Ventspils	10	3	7	846	920	–74	77-103	98-83	-	79-68
4.	(Estonia) Kalev	10	0	10	821	964	–143	73-105	101-107	80-86	-

Second round scores
	(Lithuania) ŽAL	(Sweden) PLA	(Latvia) VEN	(Estonia) KAL
(Latvia) LMT	84-105	89-83	92-81	111-92
(Lithuania) LRY	85-88	90-96	114-91	103-91
(Finland) TOP	57-92	87-93	107-88	94-89
(Lithuania) ALI	61-79	72-83	97-84	82-78

Source: Worldbasket.com

== Final Four ==
=== Semifinal 1 ===
4 April 1999

Boxscore

Žalgiris (Lithuania)	103–75	(Lithuania) Lietuvos rytas
Scoring by quarter: 25–17, 25–20, 29–14, 24–24
Pts: Masiulis 15; Rebs: E. Žukauskas 9 Asts: Edney 7		Pts: Giedraitis 20; Rebs: Kazlauskas, Šiškauskas 6 Asts: Giedraitis 6

Vilnius Sports Palace, Vilnius
Attendance: 800
Referees: Nikolaos Mpotitsis (SWE), Roman Ryzhyk (UKR)

=== Semifinal 2 ===
4 April 1999

Boxscore

Plannja Basket (Sweden)	81–87	(Latvia) ASK Brocēni-LMT
Scoring by quarter: 23–20, 20–29, 22–21, 16–17
Pts: Elliott 19; Rebs: Heiden, Banks 9 Asts: Aulander, Heiden, Elliott 4		Pts: Holden 21; Rebs: Šneps 9 Asts: Šneps 3

Vilnius Sports Palace, Vilnius
Attendance: 800
Referees: Carl Jungebrand (FIN), Romualdas Brazauskas (LTU)

=== Third-place game ===
5 April 1999

Boxscore

Lietuvos rytas (Lithuania)	95–87	(Sweden) Plannja Basket
Scoring by quarter: 25–17, 20–16, 25–23, 25–31
Pts: Giedraitis 33; Rebs: Matulis 11; Asts: Jasikevičius 9		Pts: Elliott 26; Rebs: Aulander 7 Asts: Aulander 6

Vilnius Sports Palace, Vilnius
Attendance: 3,000
Referees: Roman Ryzhyk (UKR), Juris Kokainis (LAT)

=== Final ===
5 April 1999

Boxscore

ASK Brocēni-LMT (Latvia)	81–83	(Lithuania) Žalgiris
Scoring by quarter: 21–29, 19–16, 18–14, 23–24
Pts: S. Valters 18; Rebs: Sturm, Šneps 8 Asts: Šneps 4		Pts: Edney 21; Rebs: E. Žukauskas 14; Asts: Edney 7

Vilnius Sports Palace, Vilnius
Attendance: 3,500
Referees: Carl Jungebrand (FIN), Nikolaos Mpotitsis (SWE)

== Final standings ==
Pos	Team
1.	Žalgiris
2.	ASK Brocēni-LMT
3.	Lietuvos rytas
4.	Plannja Basket
5.	TeamWARE ToPo
6.	Alita
7.	Ventspils
8.	Kalev

== All-NEBL Team'99 ==
Coaches of all teams, which participated in the 1999 NEBL Promotion Cup, selected All-NEBL Team'99:

All-NEBL Team'99
Player	Team
(United States) Eric Elliott (MVP)	Plannja Basket
(Lithuania) Andrius Giedraitis	Lietuvos rytas
(Latvia) Edgars Šneps	ASK Brocēni-LMT
(Lithuania) Saulius Štombergas	Žalgiris
(Lithuania) Eurelijus Žukauskas	Žalgiris

== See also ==
- 1998-99 FIBA Euroleague
- 1998-99 FIBA Saporta Cup
- 1998-99 FIBA Korać Cup
