= Dennis Mims =

American professional basketball player (born 1980)

Free agent
- Position: Power forward

Personal information
- Born: October 15, 1980 (age 46) Union, South Carolina, U.S.
- Listed height: 6 ft 9 in (2.06 m)
- Listed weight: 235 lb (107 kg)

Career information
- High school: Freedom (Morganton, North Carolina)
- College: Virginia Tech (1999–2001); Indiana (Pennsylvania) (2001–2002)
- NBA draft: 2002: undrafted
- Playing career: 2002–present

Career history
- 2002–2003: Cimbeiro Aironi Novara
- 2003–2004: As Sadd Sports Club
- 2004: Dakota Wizards
- 2004–2005: London Towers
- 2005: TED Kolejliler
- 2005: Astoria Bydgoszcz
- 2005: Kotwica Kołobrzeg
- 2006: Tampereen Pyrintö
- 2006: Pitatas Bogota
- 2006–2007: Ormanspor
- 2007–2008: Yeşilyurt
- 2008–2009: Beşiktaş Cola Turka
- 2009–2010: İstanbul Büyükşehir Belediyespor
- 2010: Sichuan Blue Whales
- 2010–2011: İTÜ Istanbul
- 2011: Al Ahli Sanaa
- 2011–2012: Giants Düsseldorf
- 2012–2013: Trepça
- 2013: Palanga
- 2014: Tallinna Kalev
- 2014–2015: Marler BC

Dennis Mims (born October 15, 1980) is an American professional basketball player. He assumes Turkish citizenship. He joined Beşiktaş Cola Turka for 2008–09 season. Played in China, Eurocup, Baltic cup, Asian and Balkan cup competitions.
