= North European Basketball League =

International basketball league in Europe between 1998–2003

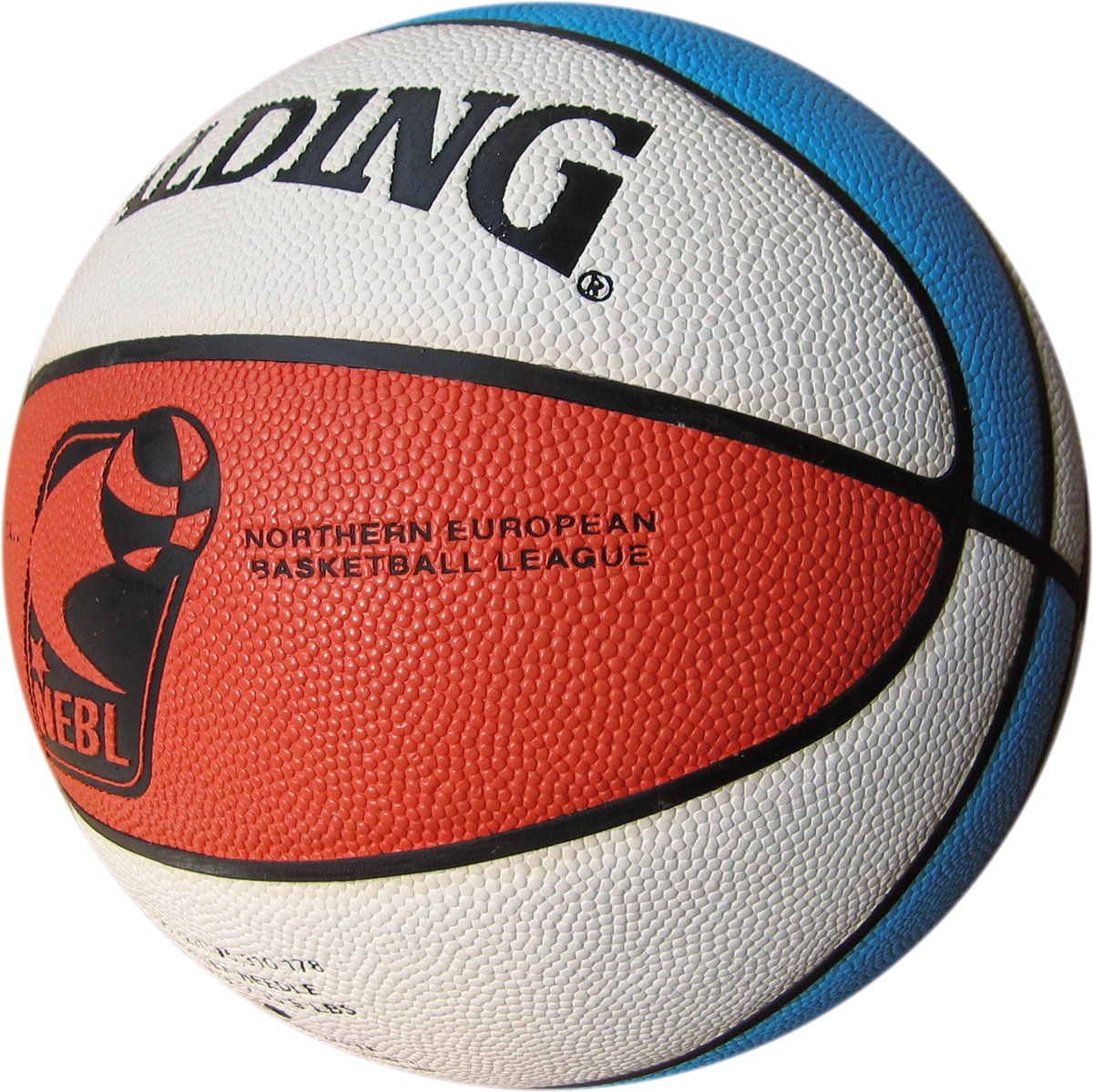
The first official basketball ball of the North European Basketball League (NEBL).

The North European Basketball League, or Northern European Basketball League (NEBL), was a short-lived regional professional basketball league. It was founded in 1998, by Šarūnas Marčiulionis and Dmitry Buriak. The league was the first commercial project of a regional league in Europe, and initially intended for participation of the best basketball teams from five countries - Lithuania, Latvia, Estonia, Sweden, and Finland.

== History ==
In 1999, the first North European Basketball League competition took place, involving eight teams, from the aforementioned countries. Eventually, the tournament started to lose its regional characteristics, as it began involving more clubs from Central (Germany, Poland, Czech Republic), Western (Belgium, the Netherlands), and Eastern (Russia, Ukraine, Belarus, Bulgaria, Romania) Europe; then, from Southern Europe (Macedonia, FR Yugoslavia), and even from Israel and Turkey. There were 31 teams, from 19 countries (from Israel to the United Kingdom), participating in the 2001–02 season's tournament. The Final Four of the NEBL, was always played in Vilnius, Lithuania.

By 2002, top clubs like CSKA Moscow, Žalgiris, and Maccabi, had lost their interest in the competition, in favor of the newly organized, and much more commercially attractive, EuroLeague. In the season 2002–03 season, a body (group stage) of the tournament was not held – the four best teams of the Northern Conference FIBA Champions Cup played for the last NEBL title in a Final Four.

The NEBL would later be transformed (since 2004) into Baltic Basketball League (BBL), with basketball teams from Lithuania, Latvia, and Estonia participating in it.

== Results ==
Season	Winner	Final score	Finalist	Total clubs	Total countries
1999 (Promo)	(Lithuania) Žalgiris Kaunas	83–81	(Latvia) ASK/Brocēni/LMT Riga	V8	5
2000	(Russia) CSKA Moscow	95–77	(Lithuania) Lietuvos rytas Vilnius	14	9
2000–01	(Russia) Ural Great Perm	88–81	(Lithuania) Žalgiris Kaunas	16	12
2001–02	(Lithuania) Lietuvos rytas Vilnius	79–74	(Russia) Ural Great Perm	31	19
2002–03	(Russia) UNICS Kazan	93–90	(Lithuania) Lietuvos rytas Vilnius	4	3

== See also ==
- European North Basketball League
- European Women's Basketball League
- Baltic Basketball League
