= HC Everest Kohtla-Järve =

Ice hockey team in Kohtla-Järve, Estonia

- City: Kohtla-Järve, Estonia
- League: Unibet Hokiliiga
- Founded: 2011
- Home arena: Kohtla-Järve Ice Hall (capacity: 2,000)
- Colours
- Head coach: Alexander Smetanin
- Captain: Andrei Parshin
- Website: HC Everest

Franchise history
- 2013–2020: Everest Kohtla-Järve
- 2020–: HC Everest Kohtla-Järve

HC Everest Kohtla-Järve is a professional ice hockey team based in Kohtla-Järve, Estonia. The team competes in the Unibet Hokiliiga, the highest league in Estonia. The team plays its home games at the Kohtla-Järve Ice Hall.

== History ==
HC Everest were founded in 2011, and since 2013 have played, sporadically, in the Meistriliiga. Originally playing under the name of Everest Kohtla-Järve, the team changed their name to HC Everest Kohtla-Järve in 2020.

In 2020 HC Everest took part in the inaugural Baltic Hockey League, a competition made up of two teams from each of Estonia, Latvia and Lithuania. Narva PSK were originally slated to represent Estonia in the competition alongside Tartu Välk 494, however, Narva were unable to participate as a result of the COVID-19 pandemic, and subsequently HC Everest took their place. They finished last in their group, losing to Lithuanian side Hockey Punks Vilnius and HK Liepāja of Latvia, as a result they did not progress to the final group.

== Youth teams ==
HC Everest operates youth ice hockey teams in different age categories in Estonia. The club is based in Kohtla-Järve, and its youth teams participate in Estonian youth ice hockey competitions organised by the Estonian Ice Hockey Association.

During the 2026–27 season, HC Everest's youth programme includes teams in the U8, U10-2, U12-2, U16 and U19 age categories. The teams compete against youth teams from clubs across Estonia, including Narva PSK, HC Vipers, HC Panter, HK Tornaado and SK Viru Sputnik. Some fixtures also involve cooperation between clubs.

The club invites children of different ages to join its ice hockey training groups. Its youth programme provides opportunities for young players to develop their skating and hockey skills and gain experience through organised matches and competitions.

All statitics about the games are registered in eestihoki.ee

Updated October 10th, 2026.

== Unibet leauge roster for 2026/27 season ==
Goaltenders
#	N	Player	Born	Acquired	Place of Birth
#73	(Finland)	Niilo Ekola	2005	2026	Nokia, Finland
#29	(Estonia)	Marek Motskevitsus	2004	2019	Narva, Estonia

Defencemen
#	N	Player	Born	Position	Acquired	Place of Birth
#90	(Estonia)	Andrei Aleksandrov	1990	D	2026	Narva, Estonia
#3	(Israel)	Oskar Levin	1996	D	2018	Tel Aviv, Israel
#95	(Estonia)	Mihhail Lupanov	2002	D	2019	Kohtla-Järve, Estonia
#8	(Estonia)	Dmitri Patrušev	1998	D	2023	Kohtla-Järve, Estonia
#55	(Estonia)	Aleksandr Smetanin	2008	D	2023	Kohtla-Järve, Estonia
#7	(Poland)	Hubert Szarzynski	2006	D	2026	Sanok, Poland

Forwards
#	N	Player	Born	Position	Acquired	Place of Birth
#89	(Russia)	Alexander Bogdanov	1989	F	2026	Narva, Estonia
#77	(Estonia)	Andrei Filonik	2008	F	2026	Kohtla-Järve, Estonia
#79	(Estonia)	Alexander V. Ilyin	2005	F	2026	Tartu, Estonia
#92	(Estonia)	Daniel Jakubovits	2008	F	2023	Kohtla-Järve, Estonia
#96	(Russia)	Anton Margolin	2007	F	2026	Saint Petersburg, Russia
#10	(Estonia)	Igor Krivorukov	1992	F	2020	Kohtla-Järve, Estonia
#17	(Estonia)	Aleksandr Tihhomirov	1999	RW	2026	Kohtla-Järve, Estonia
#57	(Bulgaria)	Stefan Pirotski	2005	F	2020	Sofia, Bulgaria
#27	(Russia)	Andrei Parshin	1998	F	2019	Saint Petersburg, Russia
#91	(Estonia)	Maksim Urlihh	1991	F	2026	Kohtla-Järve, Estonia
#9	(Russia)	Alexander Saprykin	1991	F	2026	Narva, Estonia
#19	(Estonia)	Nikita Zaitsev	1990	F	2026	Kohtla-Järve, Estonia
