= Vilnius Palace of Concerts and Sports =

Indoor arena in Vilnius, Lithuania

- Sporto rūmai
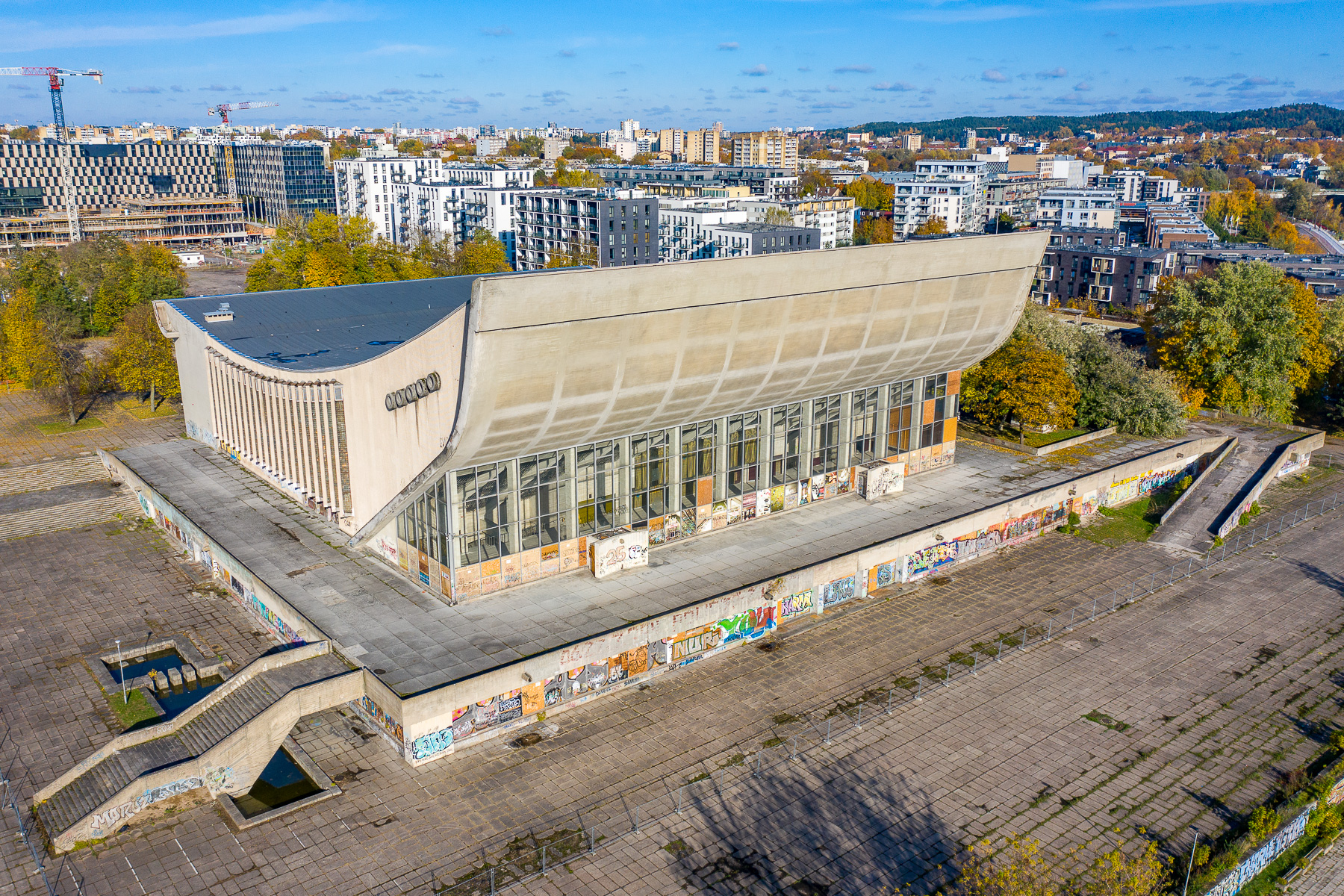
- Interactive map of Vilnius Palace of Concerts and Sports
- Full name: Vilnius Palace of Concerts and Sports
- Location: Vilnius, Lithuania
- Coordinates: 54°41′27″N 25°17′28″E
- Capacity: 4,400

Construction
- Opened: 1971
- Closed: 2004

Vilnius Palace of Concerts and Sports (Lithuanian: Sporto rūmai) is an indoor arena in Vilnius, Lithuania. The venue was opened in 1971. It was deemed unsafe and closed in 2004. Plans to reconstruct the venue received significant opposition from the Jewish community as the site is located on the grounds of the oldest Jewish cemetery in Vilnius.

The arena was capable of holding 4,400 spectators. It was primarily used for volleyball and basketball. In October 1988, the arena was the site of the Inaugural Congress of Sąjūdis, the Reform movement which led Lithuania in achieving independence from the Soviet Union. It was also the site of the public funeral of 13 Lithuanians killed by Soviet troops at the Vilnius Television Tower during the January Events of 1991.

The arena hosted 1975 World Women's Handball Championship and 1986 FIBA World Championship for Women.

The arena is emblematic of Communist Modernism. It is one of the few remaining sports arenas in this architectural style. Three other examples are -the Wiener Stadthalle in Vienna, the Hala Olivia in Gdańsk, Poland, and the now destroyed Volgar Sports Palace in Tolyatti, Russia.

== Controversy ==
The venue is located on the site of the Piramónt cemetery, the oldest Jewish cemetery in Vilnius, which dates back to the late fifteenth century, when Vilnius was the capital of the Grand Duchy of Lithuania. Russian authorities closed the cemetery in 1831. The Soviet authorities destroyed the cemetery in 1949–1950 during the construction of Žalgiris Stadium.

In August 2015, Lithuania's Chief Rabbi Chaim Burshtein was dismissed by the Lithuanian Jews after he made a public statement opposing the conversion of the arena into a convention center. In 2016–2017, a petition opposing the convention center received 38,000 signatures, many from descendants of Lithuanian Jews now living in other countries.

New plans for transforming the Palace of Concerts and Sports into a modern convention center were announced in December 2019. The plans were discussed and approved by the Lithuanian Jewish community and by the London-based Committee for the Preservation of Jewish Cemeteries in Europe. However, more than 50,000 signatures have been collected against the plan and a descendant of people buried in the cemetery sued the owners of the venue at the Vilnius District Court to halt the works. The plaintiff was later joined by more than a hundred others.
