= Jaan Puidet =

Estonian basketball player

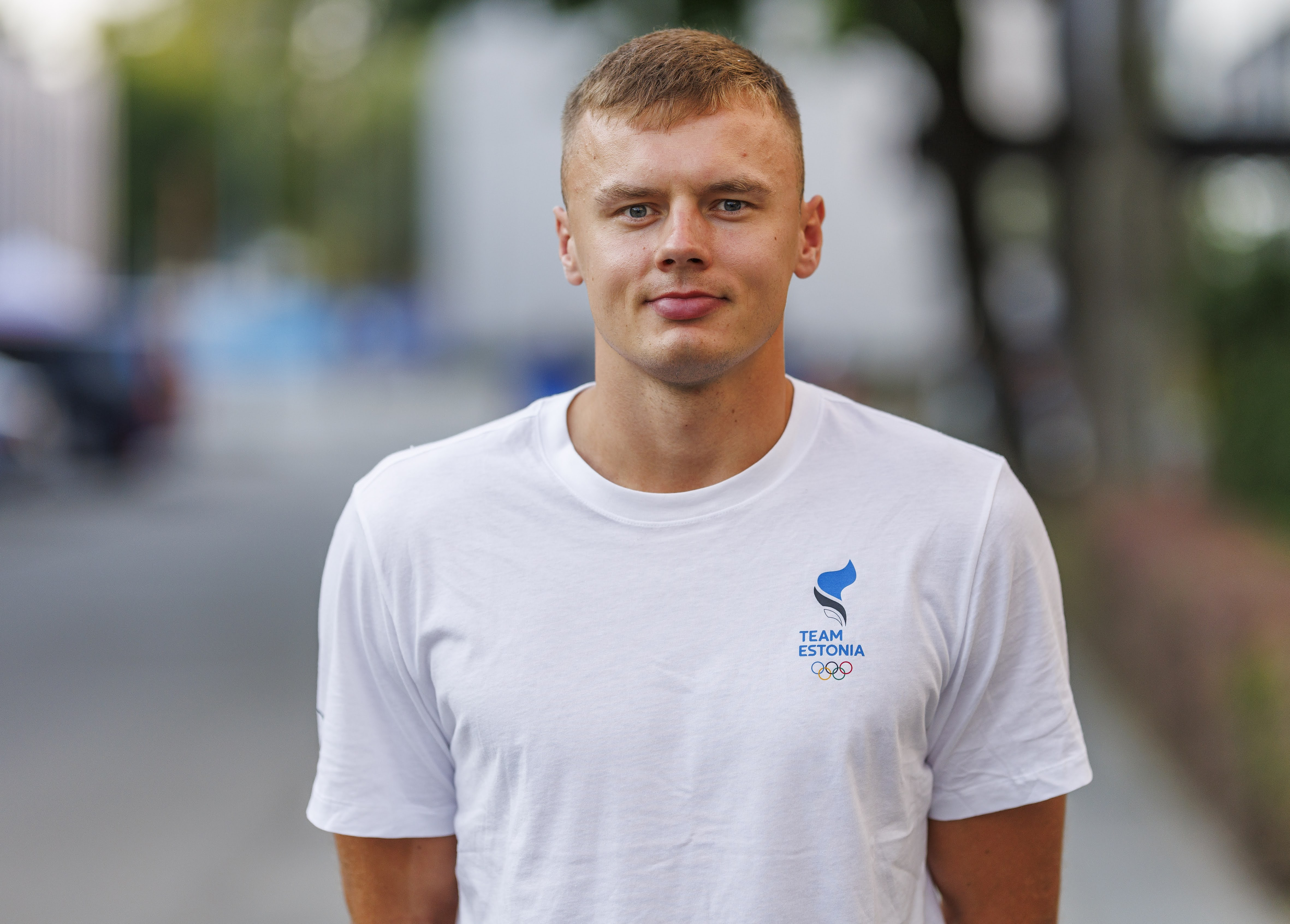
- Jaan Puidet (2023)

No. 9 – TalTech
- Position: Shooting guard
- League: Korvpalli Meistriliiga; Latvian–Estonian Basketball League; European North Basketball League

Personal information
- Born: 4 January 1992 (age 34) Tallinn, Estonia
- Listed height: 6 ft 3 in (1.91 m)
- Listed weight: 185 lb (84 kg)

Career information
- Playing career: 2008–present

Career history
- 2008–2009: Kuremaa
- 2009–2010: Pärnu
- 2010–2011: BC Kalev
- 2011–2015: TTÜ
- 2015–2018: Jämtland Basket
- 2018–2019: TalTech
- 2019–2020: Jämtland Basket
- 2020: TalTech
- 2020–2026: Real Valladolid
- 2026–present: TalTech

Career highlights
- Estonian League champion (2011); ISBL champion (2013); Estonian League Best Young Player (2009)
Medals
Representing Estonia
Men's basketball
FIBA Europe U-20 Championship Division B
| Silver medal – second place | 2011 Bosnia and Herzegovina | U20 Team |

Jaan Puidet (born 4 January 1992) is an Estonian professional basketball player for TalTech of the Estonian–Latvian Basketball League. He is a 6 ft 3 in (1.91 m) tall shooting guard. He has also represented the Estonia men's national basketball team internationally.

== Professional career ==
=== Estonia ===
Jaan Puidet won the Best Young Player award in 2009. In 2011, he won the Korvpalli Meistriliiga title with Kalev/Cramo. From 2011 to 2015, Puidet played for another Estonian league team, TTÜ.

Sweden

In 2015 he signed with Jämtland Basket of the Basketligan. Puidet returned to TTÜ in 2018.

Spain

Despite Puidet started the 2020–2021 season with TalTech team, On 10 December 2020, Puidet accepted the offer from Spanish second division team Real Valladolid and left TalTech Basketball Team.

== Estonian national team ==
Puidet has been participating in international basketball with the Estonia men's national basketball team since 2015.

== Career statistics ==
Legend
| GP | Games played | GS | Games started | MPG | Minutes per game |
| FG% | Field-goal percentage | 3P% | 3-point field-goal percentage | FT% | Free-throw percentage |
| RPG | Rebounds per game | APG | Assists per game | SPG | Steals per game |
| BPG | Blocks per game | PPG | Points per game | PIR | Performance index rating |
| **Bold** | Career high |

=== Domestic leagues ===
| Season | Team | League | GP | MPG | FG% | 3P% | FT% | RPG | APG | SPG | BPG | PPG |
|---|---|---|---|---|---|---|---|---|---|---|---|---|
| 2008–09 | Kuremaa | KML | 14 | 29.4 | .389 | .283 | .619 | 5.7 | 1.2 | 1.7 | .7 | 10.2 |
| 2009–10 | Pärnu | KML | - | - | - | - | - | - | - | - | - | - |
| 2010–11 | Kalev/Cramo | KML | 11 | 14.0 | .392 | .250 | .666 | 2.8 | 1.0 | .9 | .2 | 3.3 |
| 2011–12 | TTÜ | KML | 9 | 17.1 | .367 | .125 | .450 | 4.1 | 1.7 | .6 | .2 | 3.6 |
| 2012–13 | TTÜ | KML | 27 | 26.4 | .467 | .293 | .777 | 5.0 | 2.1 | 1.5 | .3 | 8.7 |
| 2013–14 | TTÜ | KML | 30 | 30.6 | .393 | .264 | .711 | 7.4 | 4.4 | 1.0 | .4 | 9.1 |
| 2014–15 | TTÜ | KML | 27 | 32.6 | .365 | .242 | .750 | 8.3 | 4.3 | 1.3 | .4 | 9.4 |
| 2015–16 | Jämtland Basket | Basketligan | 21 | 23.5 | .451 | .303 | .750 | 3.8 | 1.9 | .9 | .4 | 5.7 |
| 2016–17 | Jämtland Basket | Basketligan | 34 | 24.1 | .442 | .319 | .849 | 5.2 | 1.6 | .9 | .2 | 7.6 |
| 2017–18 | Jämtland Basket | Basketligan | 28 | 27.6 | .587 | .395 | .651 | 6.9 | 3.1 | 1.0 | .2 | 8.6 |
| 2018–19 | TalTech | LEBL | 25 | 29.1 | .471 | .355 | .762 | 6.7 | 4.8 | 1.5 | .4 | 13.4 |
| 2019–20 | Jämtland Basket | Basketligan | 19 | 30.4 | .511 | .353 | .769 | 5.8 | 3.8 | 1.2 | .3 | 9.4 |
| 2020–21 | TalTech | LEBL | 12 | 29.9 | .413 | .309 | .750 | 6.7 | 3.1 | 1.4 | .7 | 11.3 |
| 2020–21 | Real Valladolid | LEB Oro | 14 | 22.3 | .540 | .417 | .688 | 2.5 | 1.0 | .4 | .1 | 6.7 |
| 2021–22 | Real Valladolid | LEB Oro | 38 | 21.8 | .454 | .400 | .655 | 2.9 | 1.4 | .8 | .1 | 6.2 |

=== Estonia national team ===
| Year | Tournament | National Team | GP | GS | MPG | FG% | 3P% | FT% | RPG | APG | SPG | BPG | PPG |
|---|---|---|---|---|---|---|---|---|---|---|---|---|---|
| 2008 | 2008 U-16 European Championship Division B | Estonia U-16 | 7 | | 28.1 | .392 | .346 | .870 | 7.3 | 1.4 | 1.1 | .9 | 13.0 |
| 2009 | 2009 U-18 European Championship Division B | Estonia U-18 | 9 | | 29.9 | .387 | .292 | .727 | 5.8 | 1.6 | 1.1 | .3 | 7.0 |
| 2010 | 2010 U-18 European Championship Division B | Estonia U-18 | 8 | | 20.0 | .385 | .059 | .733 | 5.2 | 1.1 | 1.2 | .5 | 5.2 |
| 2011 | 2011 U-20 European Championship Division B | Estonia U-20 | 9 | | 19.0 | .440 | .385 | .875 | 7.3 | 1.2 | 1.1 | .5 | 7.0 |
| 2012 | 2012 U-20 European Championship | Estonia U-20 | 9 | | 26.7 | .417 | .237 | .500 | 4.4 | 1.8 | .8 | .4 | 10.1 |
| 2013 | 2013 Summer Universiade | Estonia Universiade | 8 | | 30.1 | .379 | .385 | .812 | 5.8 | 2.6 | .9 | .4 | 7.8 |
| 2015 | 2015 Summer Universiade | Estonia Universiade | 7 | | 25.3 | .323 | .130 | .500 | 4.4 | 2.0 | 1.1 | .6 | 7.1 |
| 2017 | 2019 Basketball World Cup Pre-Qualifiers | Estonia | 4 | | 11.5 | .273 | .000 | 1.000 | 2.2 | 1.5 | .7 | .0 | 2.0 |
| 2017 | 2019 Basketball World Cup Qualifiers | Estonia | 2 | | 3.5 | .000 | .000 | .000 | 1.0 | .5 | .5 | .0 | 0.0 |

== Awards and accomplishments ==
=== Professional career ===
- 1× Estonian League champion (2011)
- 1x International Students Basketball League champion (2013)
- Estonian Best Young Player (2009)
