= Narva Ice Hall =

Sports venue in Narva, Estonia

- Narva jäähall
- Interactive map of Narva Ice Hall
- Address: 26. Juuli 4, 20104 Narva, Estonia
- Location: Narva, Estonia
- Coordinates: 59°21′52″N 28°11′00″E

Tenant
- Narva PSK

Narva Ice Hall (Estonian: Narva jäähall) is an ice arena in Narva, Estonia.

The hall was opened in 2003.

Its capacity is 1500.

The hall has an ice arena with dimensions of 30 x 60 m and is used by the ice hockey club Narva PSK.
