= Haabersti Ice Hall =

Indoor ice rink in Tallinn

- Škoda jäähall
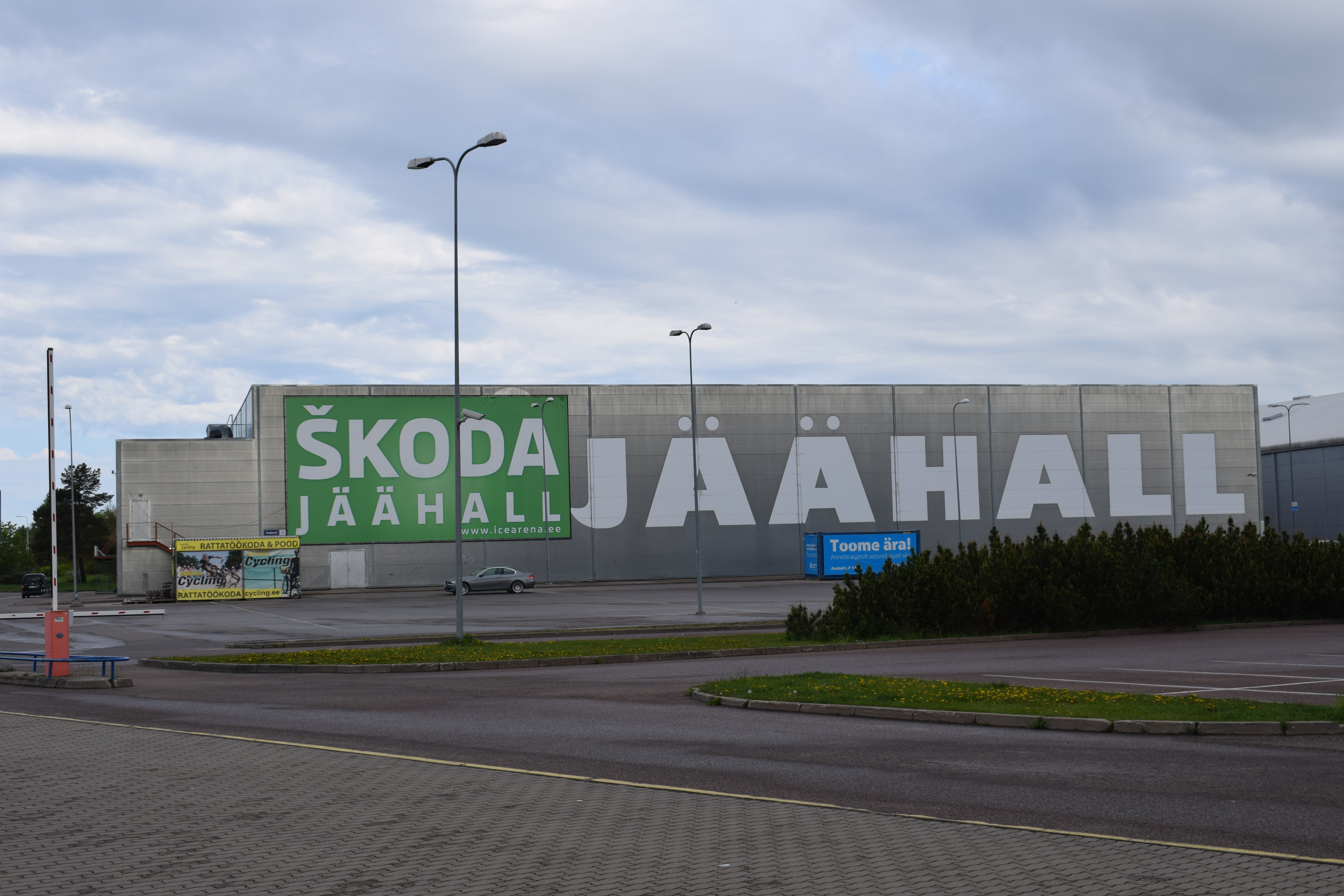
- Škoda Ice Hall
- Interactive map of Haabersti Ice Hall
- Address: Haabersti 1, 13516 Tallinn, Estonia
- Location: Tallinn, Estonia
- Coordinates: 59°25′34″N 24°38′40″E

Website
- Official website

Škoda Ice Hall (Estonian: Škoda jäähall; before 2013 Premia Ice Hall) is an ice arena in Tallinn, Estonia.

The hall was opened in winter 2002.

The hall has two ice rinks, both with dimensions of 28 x 58 m.

The hall is used by the HC Panter and HC Purikad Tallinn ice hockey clubs, as well as handball club HC Tallinn. Several Meistriliiga games have taken place in the hall.
