= Kohtla-Järve Ice Hall =

Ice arena in Kohtla-Järve, Estonia

- Kohtla-Järve jäähall
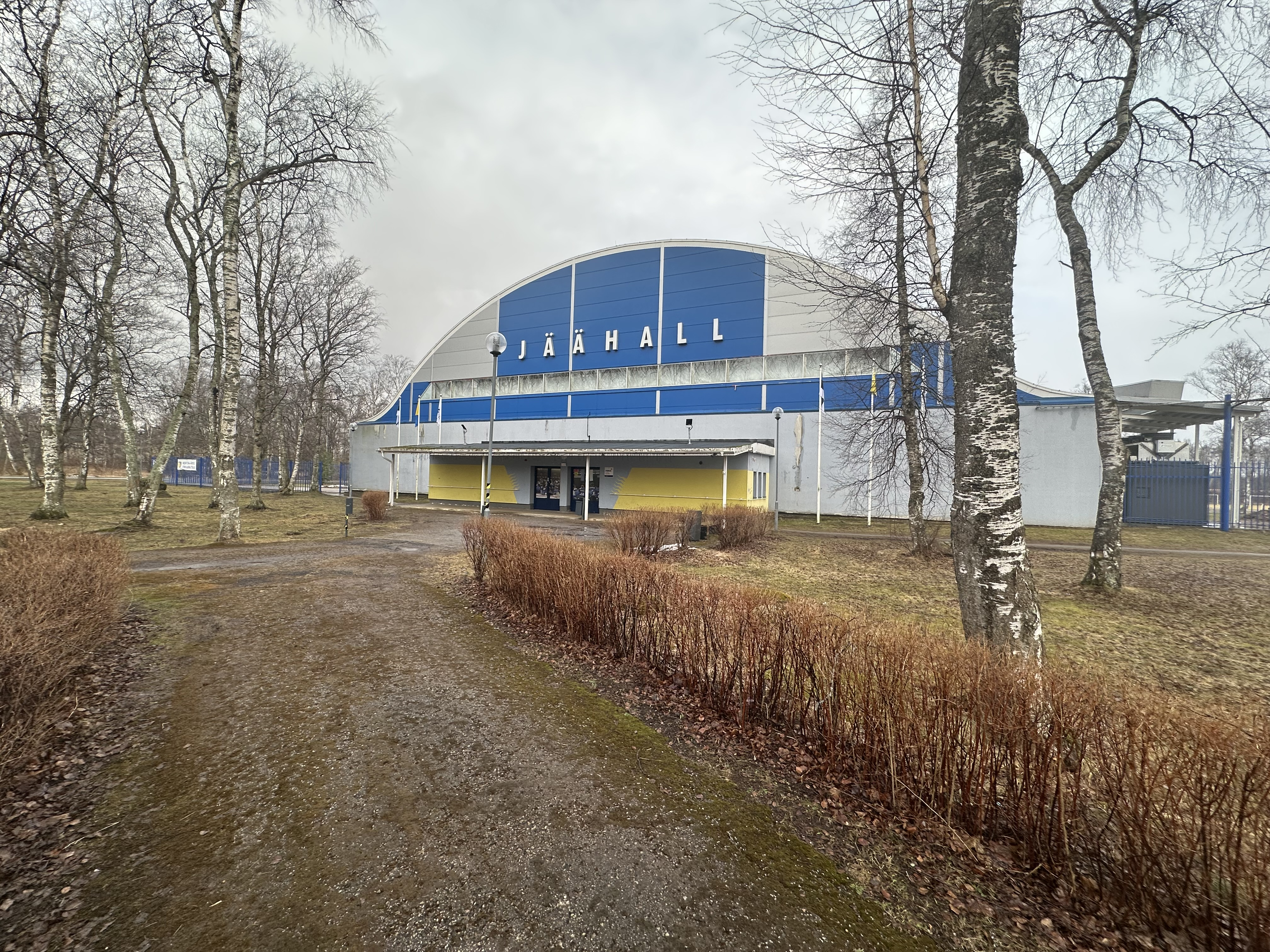
- Interactive map of Kohtla-Järve Ice Hall
- Address: Spordi 4, Kohtla-Järve, 30328 Ida-Viru maakond, Estonia
- Location: Kohtla-Järve, Estonia
- Coordinates: 59°23′52″N 27°15′26″E

Website
- k-jsk.ee/index.php/et/

Kohtla-Järve Ice Hall (Estonian: Kohtla-Järve jäähall) is an ice arena in Kohtla-Järve, Estonia.

The hall was opened in 1986. The last major reconstructions were made in 1997.

The hall's capacity is 2000.

The hall has an ice arena with dimensions of 30 x 60 m.

The hall is used by two ice hockey clubs: Kohtla-Järve Viru Sputnik and Kohtla-Järve Everest.
