= HC Vipers Tallinn =

Ice hockey team in Tallinn, Estonia

HC Vipers
- City: Tallinn, Estonia
- League: UnibetHokiliiga
- Founded: 2011
- Home arena: Tondiraba Ice Hall (capacity: 5,840)
- Colours
- Website: HC Vipers

HC Vipers Tallinn is a professional ice hockey team based in Tallinn, Estonia. The team competes in the Meistriliiga, the highest league in Estonia. The team plays its home games at the Tondiraba Ice Hall.

== History ==
HC Vipers were founded in 2011, and have been sporadic members of the Meistriliiga, first playing in the league during the 2017–18 season.Originally playing under the name of HC Vipers, the team changed their name to HC Vipers Tallinn in 2020.
