= Valmo Kriisa =

Estonian basketball player

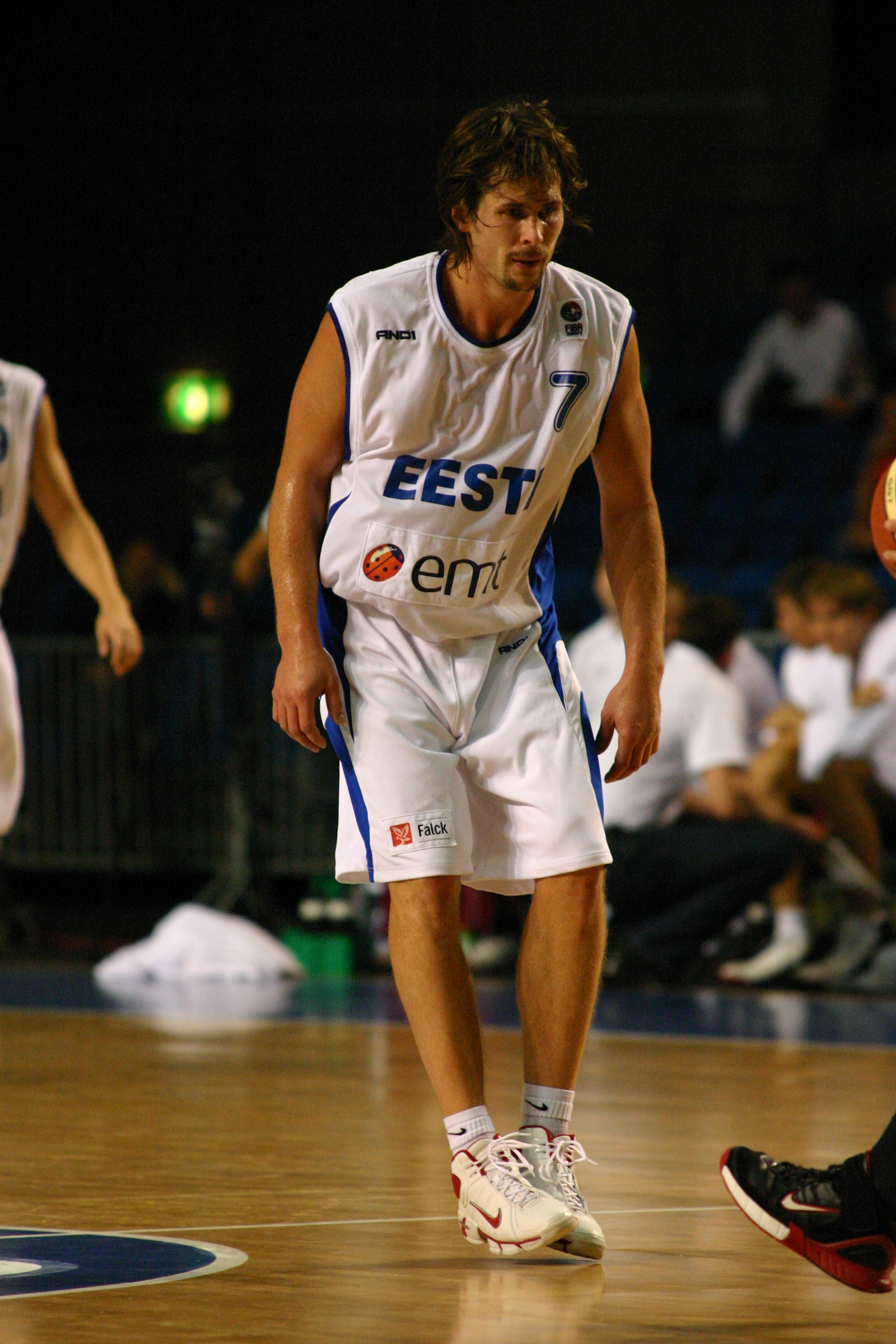
- Kriisa in 2006

Personal information
- Born: 18 May 1974 (age 52) Pärnu, then part of Estonian SSR, Soviet Union
- Listed height: 6 ft 3 in (1.91 m)
- Listed weight: 198 lb (90 kg)

Career information
- Playing career: 1990–2017, 2022
- Position: Point guard / shooting guard
- Number: 7

Career history
- 1990–1997: Tartu
- 1997–2000: Nybit
- 2000–2001: Södertälje BBK
- 2001–2003: Tallinna Kalev
- 2003–2006: Hanzevast Capitals
- 2006–2009: BC Kalev
- 2009–2010: Rakvere Tarvas
- 2010–2011: TTÜ/Kalev
- 2011–2012: Rakvere Tarvas
- 2012–2015: University of Tartu
- 2015–2017: Valga-Valka/Maks & Moorits
- 2022: Tallinna Kalev

Career highlights
- 4× Estonian League champion (2002, 2003, 2009, 2015); Dutch League champion (2004); 7× Estonian Cup winner (1998, 2001, 2006–2008, 2013, 2014); Dutch Cup winner (2005); Estonian Player of the Year (2007); Estonian League MVP (2010); Estonian League Best Defender (2007); 2× Estonian League First Team (2007, 2010); 2× Estonian League All-Star (2004, 2007)

Valmo Kriisa (born 18 May 1974) is an Estonian former professional basketball player.

== Career ==
Kriisa played at the point guard and shooting guard positions. Kriisa started his senior club career with "KK Tartu" team (Tartu Ülikool/Rock) in 1990 and after 96–97 season he moved to "Nybit". He spent the 2000–01 season in Sweden with Södertälje BBK.

Kriisa then returned to Estonia, signed for two seasons with "BC Kalev" and won the Estonian Championship titles in 2002 and 2003. On seasons 2003–2006 he played for the Dutch Eredivisie team Hanzevast Capitals. During this period he won the Dutch Championship in 2004. After three seasons in The Netherlands, Kriisa came back to Estonia and joined BC Kalev/Cramo. He spent three seasons with Kalev winning one Estonian Championship. In 2007 he was named the Estonian Basketball Player of the Year.

Kriisa spent the 2009-10 season with BC Rakvere Tarvas helping the team to the Estonian league finals for the first time. Though Tarvas lost to Tartu Ülikool/Rock, Kriisa was named the KML Most Valuable Player. In the 2010-11 season Kriisa played for TTÜ/Kalev.

Beginning in 1995, Kriisa was a member of the Estonia men's national basketball team and was also a member of the Estonian EuroBasket 2001 squad.

== Personal life ==
He is the father of Kerr Kriisa, who has played U.S. college basketball at the University of Arizona and West Virginia University and will play his final season of college basketball in 2024–25 at the University of Kentucky.

== Honours ==
=== Club ===
Nybit

- Estonian Basketball Cup: 1998

Tallinna Kalev

- Korvpalli Meistriliiga: 2001–02, 2002–03
- Estonian Basketball Cup: 2001

Hanzevast Capitals

- Dutch Basketball League: 2003–04
- Dutch Cup: 2005

Kalev/Cramo

- Korvpalli Meistriliiga: 2008–09
- Estonian Basketball Cup: 2006, 2007, 2008

University of Tartu

- Korvpalli Meistriliiga: 2014–15
- Estonian Basketball Cup: 2013, 2014

=== Individual ===
- Estonian Basketball Player of the Year: 2007
- KML Most Valuable Player: 2010
- KML Best Defender: 2007
- All-KML First Team: 2007, 2010
- KML All-Star: 2004. 2007
