= KML Coach of the Year Award =

Estonian sport award

The KML Coach of the Year (Estonian: Korvpalli Meistriliiga aasta treener) is an award for the top-tier professional basketball league in Estonia, the Korvpalli Meistriliiga (KML).

== Winners ==
Season	Coach	Team
1996–97	(Estonia) Üllar Kerde	BC Tallinn
1997–98	(Netherlands) Maarten van Gent	BC Kalev
1998–99	(Estonia) Üllar Kerde	BC Tallinn
1999–00	(Estonia) Üllar Kerde	Tallinna Kalev
2000–01	(Estonia) Jüri Neissaar	Tartu Ülikool-Delta
2001–02	(Estonia) Tiit Sokk	Nybit
2002–03	(Estonia) Andres Sõber	Tallinna Kalev
2003–04	(Estonia) Tõnu Lust	Tartu Ülikool/Rock
2004–05	(Estonia) Allan Dorbek	Ehitustööriist
2005–06	(Estonia) Aivar Kuusmaa	BC Kalev/Cramo
2006–07	(Serbia) Veselin Matić	BC Kalev/Cramo
2007–08	(Estonia) Üllar Kerde	Tartu Ülikool/Rock
2008–09	(New Zealand) Nenad Vučinić	BC Kalev/Cramo
2009–10	(Estonia) Andres Sõber	BC Rakvere Tarvas
2010–11	(Estonia) Aivar Kuusmaa	BC Kalev/Cramo
2011–12	(Estonia) Aivar Kuusmaa	BC Kalev/Cramo
2012–13	(Estonia) Alar Varrak	BC Kalev/Cramo
2013–14	(Estonia) Alar Varrak	BC Kalev/Cramo
2014–15	(Estonia) Gert Kullamäe	Tartu Ülikool/Rock
2015–16	(Estonia) Alar Varrak	BC Kalev/Cramo
2016–17	(Estonia) Aivar Kuusmaa	AVIS UTILITAS Rapla
2017–18	(Lithuania) Donaldas Kairys	BC Kalev/Cramo
2018–19	(Lithuania) Donaldas Kairys	BC Kalev/Cramo
2020–21	(Latvia) Roberts Štelmahers	BC Kalev/Cramo
2021–22	(Estonia) Heiko Rannula	Pärnu Sadam

== See also ==
- Korvpalli Meistriliiga
- KML Most Valuable Player Award
- KML Finals Most Valuable Player Award
- KML Best Defender Award
- KML Best Young Player Award
- KML All-Star Five
