= KML All-Star Five =

Estonian basketball award

KML All-Star Five (Estonian: Korvpalli Meistriliiga tähtede viisik) is an award for the top-tier professional basketball league in Estonia, the Korvpalli Meistriliiga (KML). It is the yearly selection of the league's top five basketball players, by position.

== KML All-Star Five by season ==
Season	Pos	Player	Team
1997–98	PG	(Estonia) Rauno Pehka	BC Kalev
1997–98	SG	(Estonia) Gert Kullamäe	BC Kalev
1997–98	SF	(Estonia) Indrek Rumma	BC Tallinn
1997–98	PF	(Estonia) Margus Metstak	BC Tallinn
1997–98	C	(Estonia) Marek Noormets	Nybit
1998–99	PG	(Estonia) Jaanus Liivak	SK Polaris
1998–99	SG	(Estonia) Aivar Kuusmaa	BC Tallinn
1998–99	SF	(Estonia) Indrek Rumma	BC Tallinn
1998–99	PF	(United States) Larry Daniels	BC Kalev
1998–99	C	(Estonia) Margus Metstak	BC Tallinn
1999–00	PG	(Estonia) Rauno Pehka	Tallinna Ülikoolid-A. Le Coq
1999–00	SG	(Estonia) Aivar Kuusmaa	Tallinna Kalev
1999–00	SF	(Estonia) Gert Kullamäe	Tallinna Kalev
1999–00	PF	(Estonia) Andre Pärn	Tallinna Kalev
1999–00	C	(Estonia) Margus Metstak	Tallinna Ülikoolid-A. Le Coq
2000–01	PG	(Estonia) Toomas Liivak	Tartu Ülikool-Delta
2000–01	SG	(Estonia) Indrek Varblane	Nybit
2000–01	SF	(Estonia) Tanel Tein	Tartu Ülikool-Delta
2000–01	PF	(Estonia) Tarmo Kikerpill	Tartu Ülikool-Delta
2000–01	C	(Estonia) Margus Metstak	Tallinna Ülikoolid-A. Le Coq
2001–02	PG	(Estonia) Rauno Pehka	Tallinna Kalev
2001–02	SG	(Estonia) Aivar Kuusmaa	TTÜ-A. Le Coq
2001–02	SF	(Estonia) Toomas Kandimaa	Tartu Rock
2001–02	PF	(Estonia) Tarmo Kikerpill	Tartu Rock
2001–02	C	(Russia) Igor Kurashov	Hotronic
2002–03	PG	(Estonia) Rauno Pehka	Tallinna Kalev
2002–03	SG	(Estonia) Aivar Kuusmaa	TTÜ/A. Le Coq
2002–03	SF	(Estonia) Andre Pärn	TTÜ/A. Le Coq
2002–03	PF	(Estonia) Kristjan Kangur	Tallinna Kalev
2002–03	C	(United States) Larry Daniels	Tallinna Kalev
2003–04	PG	(Estonia) Rauno Pehka	TTÜ/A. Le Coq
2003–04	SG	(Lithuania) Augenijus Vaškys	TÜ/Rock
2003–04	SF	(Estonia) Erki Kivinukk	Pirita TOP Spa
2003–04	PF	(Estonia) Tarmo Kikerpill	TÜ/Rock
2003–04	C	(Estonia) Vallo Allingu	TÜ/Rock
2004–05	PG	(Spain) Víctor González	Ehitustööriist
2004–05	SG	(United States) Howard Frier	Ehitustööriist
2004–05	SF	(Estonia) Marek Doronin	TÜ/Rock
2004–05	PF	(Estonia) Tarmo Kikerpill	TÜ/Rock
2004–05	C	(Estonia) Ardo Ärmpalu	Rakvere
2005–06	PG	(Estonia) Tanel Sokk	Dalkia/Nybit
2005–06	SG	(Estonia) Tanel Tein	TÜ/Rock
2005–06	SF	(Estonia) Gregor Arbet	Dalkia/Nybit
2005–06	PF	(Estonia) Rait Keerles	BC Kalev/Cramo
2005–06	C	(Estonia) Vallo Allingu	TÜ/Rock
2006–07	PG	(Estonia) Valmo Kriisa	BC Kalev/Cramo
2006–07	SG	(Estonia) Tanel Tein	TÜ/Rock
2006–07	SF	(Estonia) Gert Kullamäe	TÜ/Rock
2006–07	PF	(Estonia) Kristjan Kangur	BC Kalev/Cramo
2006–07	C	(United States) Travis Reed	BC Kalev/Cramo
2007–08	PG	(Georgia (country)) Giorgi Tsintsadze	TÜ/Rock
2007–08	SG	(Estonia) Tanel Tein	TÜ/Rock
2007–08	SF	(Estonia) Kristjan Kangur	BC Kalev/Cramo
2007–08	PF	(Estonia) Janar Talts	TÜ/Rock
2007–08	C	(United States) Brian Cusworth	TÜ/Rock
2008–09	PG	(United States) John Linehan	BC Kalev/Cramo
2008–09	SG	(Georgia (country)) Giorgi Tsintsadze	TÜ/Rock
2008–09	SF	(Estonia) Kristjan Kangur	BC Kalev/Cramo
2008–09	PF	(Estonia) Janar Talts	TÜ/Rock
2008–09	C	(United States) Nate Fox	BC Kalev/Cramo
2009–10	PG	(Estonia) Valmo Kriisa	Rakvere Tarvas
2009–10	SG	(Estonia) Rain Veideman	Rakvere Tarvas
2009–10	SF	(United States) Charron Fisher	BC Kalev/Cramo
2009–10	PF	(Estonia) Janar Talts	TÜ/Rock
2009–10	C	(United States) Scott Morrison	TÜ/Rock
2010–11	PG	(Estonia) Sten Sokk	TÜ/Rock
2010–11	SG	(Latvia) Armands Šķēle	BC Kalev/Cramo
2010–11	SF	(Estonia) Gregor Arbet	BC Kalev/Cramo
2010–11	PF	(Estonia) Heigo Erm	Piimameister Otto/Rapla
2010–11	C	(United States) Bambale Osby	TTÜ/Kalev
2011–12	PG	(Estonia) Tanel Sokk	BC Kalev/Cramo
2011–12	SG	(Estonia) Janar Soo	Piimameister Otto/Rapla
2011–12	SF	(Estonia) Gregor Arbet	BC Kalev/Cramo
2011–12	PF	(United States) Bill Amis	Tartu Ülikool
2011–12	C	(Latvia) Kaspars Cipruss	Rakvere Tarvas
2012–13	PG	(Estonia) Tanel Sokk	BC Kalev/Cramo
2012–13	SG	(United States) Brandis Raley-Ross	Rakvere Tarvas
2012–13	SF	(Latvia) Juris Umbraško	Rakvere Tarvas
2012–13	PF	(United States Virgin Islands) Frank Elegar	BC Kalev/Cramo
2012–13	C	(Senegal) Bamba Fall	BC Kalev/Cramo
2013–14	PG	(Lithuania) Augustas Pečiukevičius	TÜ/Rock
2013–14	SG	(Estonia) Rain Veideman	BC Kalev/Cramo
2013–14	SF	(Estonia) Tanel Kurbas	TÜ/Rock
2013–14	PF	(Estonia) Janar Talts	TÜ/Rock
2013–14	C	(United States Virgin Islands) Frank Elegar	BC Kalev/Cramo
2014–15	PG	(Brazil) Scott Machado	BC Kalev/Cramo
2014–15	SG	(United States) Brandis Raley-Ross	Rakvere Tarvas
2014–15	SF	(Estonia) Gregor Arbet	BC Kalev/Cramo
2014–15	PF	(Estonia) Janar Talts	TÜ/Rock
2014–15	C	(Croatia) Domagoj Bubalo	TYCO Rapla
2015–16	PG	(Estonia) Sten Sokk	BC Kalev/Cramo
2015–16	SG	(Estonia) Gregor Arbet	BC Kalev/Cramo
2015–16	SF	(Estonia) Indrek Kajupank	AVIS Rapla
2015–16	PF	(Estonia) Kristjan Kitsing	TTÜ
2015–16	C	(Saint Vincent and the Grenadines) Shawn King	BC Kalev/Cramo
2016–17	PG	(Bulgaria) Branko Mirković	BC Kalev/Cramo
2016–17	SG	(Estonia) Martin Paasoja	AVIS UTILITAS Rapla
2016–17	SF	(Estonia) Janari Jõesaar	Tartu Ülikool
2016–17	PF	(Estonia) Indrek Kajupank	AVIS UTILITAS Rapla
2016–17	C	(Netherlands) Thomas van der Mars	AVIS UTILITAS Rapla
2017–18	PG	(Estonia) Tanel Sokk	Tartu Ülikool
2017–18	SG	(United States) Isaiah Briscoe	BC Kalev/Cramo
2017–18	SF	(United States) Dominique Hawkins	AVIS UTILITAS Rapla
2017–18	PF	(Montenegro) Bojan Subotić	BC Kalev/Cramo
2017–18	C	(Estonia) Janar Talts	Tartu Ülikool
2018–19	PG	(United States) Chavaughn Lewis	BC Kalev/Cramo
2018–19	SG	(United States) Damarcus Harrison	Tallinna Kalev/TLÜ
2018–19	SF	(United States) Demetre Rivers	Pärnu Sadam
2018–19	PF	(Estonia) Toomas Raadik	TalTech
2018–19	C	(United States) Arnett Moultrie	BC Kalev/Cramo
2020–21	PG	(United States) Marcus Keene	BC Kalev/Cramo
2020–21	SG	(Finland) Edon Maxhuni	Pärnu Sadam
2020–21	SF	(Estonia) Janari Jõesaar	BC Kalev/Cramo
2020–21	PF	(Latvia) Roberts Freimanis	AVIS UTILITAS Rapla
2020–21	C	(United States) Devin Thomas	BC Kalev/Cramo
2021–22	PG	(United States) Alterique Gilbert	Pärnu Sadam
2021–22	SG	(Estonia) Märt Rosenthal	Tartu Ülikool Maks & Moorits
2021–22	SF	(Estonia) Robert Valge	Pärnu Sadam
2021–22	PF	(Estonia) Mihkel Kirves	Pärnu Sadam
2021–22	C	(United States) Emmanuel Wembi	Tartu Ülikool Maks & Moorits
2022–23	PG	(United States) Ty Gordon	Tartu Ülikool Maks & Moorits
2022–23	SF	(Estonia) Hugo Toom	BC Kalev/Cramo
2022–23	SF	(Estonia) Artur Konontšuk	BC Kalev/Cramo
2022–23	PF	(Estonia) Mihkel Kirves	Pärnu Sadam
2022–23	C	(Estonia) Karl Johan Lips	Viimsi/Sportland
2023–24	PG	(Estonia) Siim-Markus Post	Pärnu Sadam
2023–24	SG	(Estonia) Märt Rosenthal	Tartu Ülikool Maks & Moorits
2023–24	SF	(Estonia) Mikk Jurkatamm	BC Kalev/Cramo
2023–24	PF	(Estonia) Tormi Niits	AVIS UTILITAS Rapla
2023–24	C	(Chile) Manny Suárez	BC Kalev/Cramo
2024–25	SG	(Estonia) Stefan Vaaks	BC Kalev/Cramo
2024–25	SF	(Estonia) Hugo Toom	BC Kalev/Cramo
2024–25	SF	(Estonia) Rasmus Andre	TalTech/ALEXELA
2024–25	SF	(Egypt) Omar El-Sheikh	Tartu Ülikool Maks & Moorits
2024–25	PF	(Estonia) Karl Johan Lips	Tartu Ülikool Maks & Moorits
2025–26	PG	(United States) Devin Harris	Transcom Pärnu
2025–26	SF	(Estonia) Hugo Toom	Kalev/Cramo
2025–26	PF	(Estonia) Oliver Metsalu	TalTech/ALEXELA
2025–26	PF	(Estonia) Markus Ilver	Tartu Ülikool Maks & Moorits
2025–26	C	(United States) Dylan Painter	Tartu Ülikool Maks & Moorits

== See also ==
- Korvpalli Meistriliiga
- KML Most Valuable Player Award
- KML Finals Most Valuable Player Award
- KML Best Defender Award
- KML Best Young Player Award
- KML Coach of the Year
