= KML Best Young Player Award =

Estonian sport award

The KML Best Young Player Award (Estonian: Korvpalli Meistriliiga parim noormängija) is an award for the top-tier professional basketball league in Estonia, the Korvpalli Meistriliiga.

== Winners ==
Season	Player	Team
1999–00	(Estonia) Indrek Suur	Tallinna Kalev
2000–01	(Estonia) Veljo Vares	Tartu Ülikool-Delta
2001–02	(Estonia) Erik Dorbek	Tallinna Kalev
2002–03	(Estonia) Tanel Sokk	Nybit
2003–04	(Estonia) Kristo Saage	Rakvere
2004–05	(Estonia) Gert Dorbek	Tallinna Kalev
2005–06	(Estonia) Sten Sokk	Noortekoondis/Audentes
2006–07	(Estonia) Sten Sokk	Dalkia/Nybit
2007–08	(Estonia) Sten Sokk	Triobet/Dalkia
2009–10	(Estonia) Rain Veideman	BC Rakvere Tarvas
2010–11	(Estonia) Rain Veideman	Tartu Ülikool/Rock
2011–12	(Estonia) Rait-Riivo Laane	Piimameister Otto/Rapla
2012–13	(Estonia) Rait-Riivo Laane	TYCO Rapla
2013–14	(Estonia) Sander Saare	Rakvere Tarvas
2014–15	(Estonia) Siim-Markus Post	Audentes/Noortekoondis
2015–16	(Estonia) Norman Käbin	Pärnu Sadam
2016–17	(Estonia) Siim-Markus Post	Rakvere Tarvas/Palmse Metall
2017–18	(Estonia) Matthias Tass	TTÜ
2018–19	(Lithuania) Arnas Velička	Tartu Ülikool
2020–21	(Estonia) Hugo Toom	Pärnu Sadam
2021–22	(Estonia) Ralf Küttis	TalTech/Optibet

== See also ==
- Korvpalli Meistriliiga
- KML Most Valuable Player Award
- KML Finals Most Valuable Player Award
- KML Best Defender Award
- KML Coach of the Year
- KML All-Star Five
