= Kristjan Kangur =

Estonian basketball player

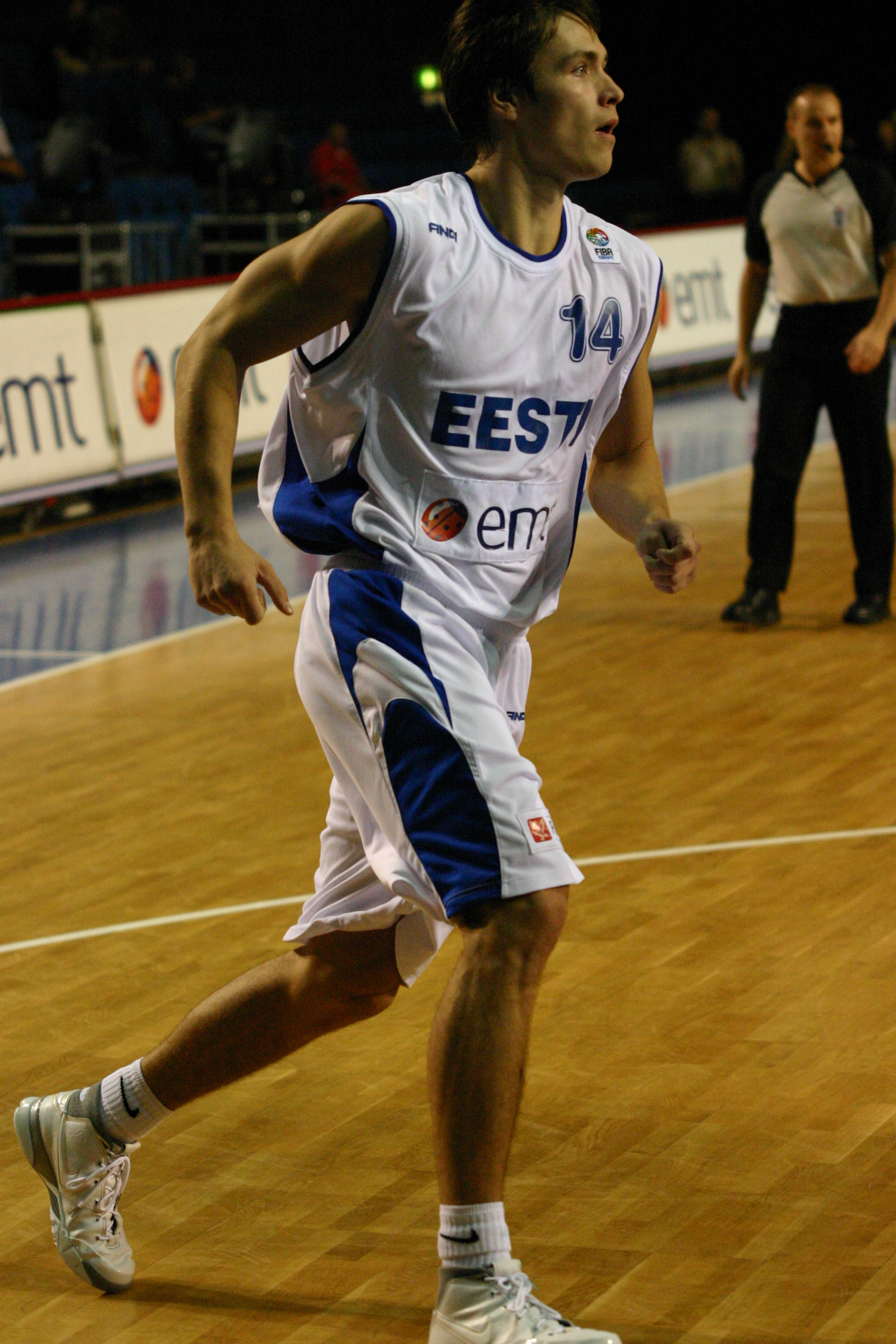
- Kangur for Estonia in 2006

Estonia
- Title: Assistant coach

Personal information
- Born: 23 October 1982 (age 44) Pärnu, then part of Estonian SSR, Soviet Union
- Listed height: 6 ft 8 in (2.03 m)
- Listed weight: 238 lb (108 kg)

Career information
- NBA draft: 2004: undrafted
- Playing career: 2000–2023
- Position: Small forward

Career history

Playing
- 2000–2004: Kalev
- 2004–2006: Bayer Giants Leverkusen
- 2006–2009: BC Kalev
- 2009–2010: ASVEL Basket
- 2010: Virtus Bologna
- 2010–2011: Pallacanestro Varese
- 2011–2013: Montepaschi Siena
- 2011–2012: →Pallacanestro Varese
- 2013–2014: Olimpia Milano
- 2014–2015: Pallacanestro Varese
- 2015: Laboral Kutxa Baskonia
- 2015–2017: Pallacanestro Varese
- 2017–2020: BC Kalev
- 2020–2021: TalTech
- 2021: Pärnu Sadam
- 2021–2022: BC Kalev
- 2022–2023: Tallinna Kalev

Coaching
- 2024–2025: BC Kalev (assistant)
- 2025–present: Estonia (assistant)

Career highlights
- 5× Estonian League champion (2002, 2003, 2009, 2018, 2019); 2× Italian League champion (2013, 2014); 4× Estonian Cup winner (2001, 2006–2008); Italian Cup champion (2013); French League Cup winner (2010); French Supercup winner (2009); 8× Estonian Player of the Year (2009–2016); 2× Estonian League Finals MVP (2009, 2018); 4× Estonian League First Team (2003, 2007–2009); 3× Estonian League All-Star (2004, 2007, 2018); Baltic League All-Star (2008); As assistant coach: Estonian League champion (2025); Estonian Cup winner (2025)

Kristjan Kangur (born 23 October 1982) is an Estonian professional basketball coach and former player who currently serves as an assistant coach for Estonian national team. He is 2.03 m (6 ft 8 in) tall, and played at both the small forward and power forward positions.

== Professional career ==
=== 2000–2010 ===
Kangur started his professional career in 2000, when he signed with Tallinn Kalev. He stayed with the team for the next three years winning the Estonian Championship titles in 2002 and 2003. He also won the Estonian Cup in 2001. Despite his young age, Kangur was one of the top performers in the Estonian league averaging 11.2 points and 7.3 rebounds in the 2002–03 season and 15.7 points and 6.2 rebounds in the 2003–04 season.

Good performances in Estonia earned Kangur his first foreign contract in 2004 when he signed with Bayer Giants Leverkusen of the German Bundesliga where he spent the next two seasons. After two years in Germany he returned to Estonia and signed with Kalev/Cramo. He stayed with the team until the end of the 2008–09 season winning three Estonian Cups and one Estonian Championship. Kangur was a solid leader for Kalev during those three seasons. He averaged 11.4 points and 4.9 rebounds in the 2009 play-offs and was awarded the MVP of Estonian League Finals.

In July 2009 Kangur signed a deal with French Pro A top team ASVEL Basket. He averaged 5.9 points and 2.0 rebounds in his debut season of the EuroLeague as well as 5.1 points and 2.0 rebounds in Pro A. Though Kangur won the French Supercup and French League Cup with ASVEL, the season was a disappointment to the team as they narrowly missed out the EuroLeague Top 16 phase and didn't reach to the playoffs of their domestic league.

=== 2010–2017 ===
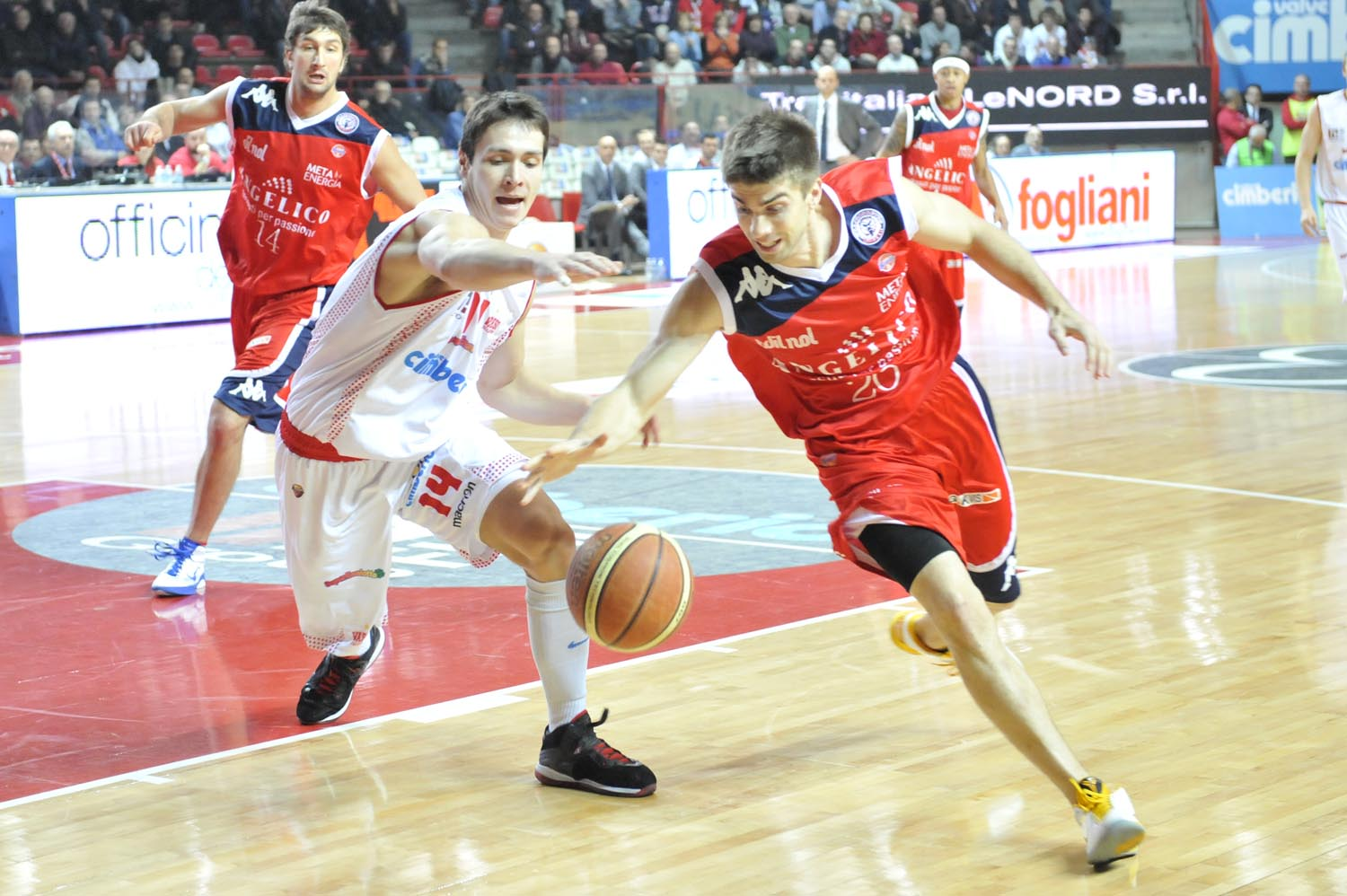
Kangur fighting for the ball with Jeffrey Viggiano of Angelico Biella in January 2011

Kangur signed with Italian top team Virtus Bologna just before the Italian league play-offs in May 2010. He played five games for the Bologna team averaging 7.6 points with a field goal percentage of 90% on two-pointers and 100% on three-pointers. For the 2010–11 season Kangur signed with Pallacanestro Varese. He was one of the top players in the team averaging 9.9 points and 5.4 rebounds in 32 games. In July 2011 Kangur signed a three-year deal with Italian powerhouse Montepaschi Siena but was loaned to Varese for the 2011–2012 season. In his second year in Varese he posted similar numbers with 10.9 points and 5.2 rebounds in 36 games and earned himself a place in Siena's roster.

During his tenure with Siena Kangur won both the Italian Cup and the Italian League and also reached to the Top 16 phase of the EuroLeague. He showed a high-quality game on both sides of the court by being one of the top defensive players in the team and also hitting 23 three-pointers with 56.1% accuracy in the EuroLeague Regular Season.

On 3 September 2013, he signed with Emporio Armani Milano. At Milan he was reunited with coach Luca Banchi who coached him last season at Siena, and also with fellow player David Moss with whom he played together in Siena and Bologna. On 21 October, Kangur had a back surgery in Milan which forced him off the court for almost two months. He played his first official game for Milano on 16 December against Victoria Libertas Pesaro in the Italian League. Kangur helped Milano to reach the 2013–14 Euroleague Quarterfinals where they lost to eventual champions Maccabi Tel Aviv. Kangur helped Milano to finish the season with the Italian title by defeating Montepaschi Siena thus ending Siena's seven-year winning streak at the Italian Championships. This was Milano's 26th domestic title and their first title since 1996.

On 11 August 2014, he returned after two years to Pallacanestro Varese. In November 2014 Kangur had second back surgery and wasn't able to play until January 2015. All in all, the season was a disappointment for Kangur and the Varese team as they finished 11th in the Italian League.

On 11 October 2015, Kangur signed a two-month deal with the Spanish team Laboral Kutxa Baskonia to replace injured Tornike Shengelia. He became the first ever Estonian basketball player who had played in the Spanish ACB League. Kangur was released from the team after his contract expired on 22 November. He represented Baskonia in six Euroleague games averaging 2.0 points and 1.8 rebounds and in three ACB games averaging 3.7 points and 3.3 rebounds.

After the short stint in Spain, Kangur returned to Varese for the rest of the season. The team narrowly missed out of the Italian League play-offs, finishing 9th. Kangur and Varese also took part in the inaugural season of the FIBA Europe Cup. The team reached the final where they were defeated by Fraport Skyliners of the Basketball Bundesliga with the score 62–66. In June 2016, Kangur signed a new two-year deal with Varese. Varese finished the 2016–17 season on a disappointing 12th place and Kangur parted ways with the team in July 2017.

=== 2017–present ===
After eight seasons playing abroad Kangur returned to Estonia and rejoined with his former club Kalev/Cramo on 6 September 2017. With Kalev/Cramo Kangur won his fourth Estonian League title and was named MVP of Estonian League Finals for the second time in his career. On the season, he averaged 6.9 points and 4.5 rebounds per game. He re-signed with the club on 8 September 2018 to play in the newly formed Latvian-Estonian Basketball League (LEBL). Kalev/Cramo finished the first LEBL season in third place and defended the home league title giving Kangur his fifth Estonian Championship. The next season was cut short due to the COVID-19 pandemic.

Kangru left Kalev/Cramo after three seasons and signed with TalTech in September 2020. He parted ways with TalTech in mid-season to join his hometown club Pärnu Sadam in February 2021.

On 14 October 2021, Kangur signed with Kalev/Cramo in the Latvian–Estonian Basketball League.

== Estonian national team ==
Kangur represented Estonia for the first time in youth level at the 2002 FIBA Europe Under-20 Championship Qualifying Round. In his first game, he was the top scorer for Estonia with 18 points in 23 minutes against Denmark. Kangur also played at the 2003 Summer Universiade.

He made his debut for the Estonia national basketball team on 20 November 2002, at the age of 20. He scored 4 points in 8 minutes during EuroBasket 2003 Qualification Semi-Final Round game against Belarus. Since then, he has been a certain selection for the national team representing Estonia at the 2005, 2007, 2009, 2013 and 2015 EuroBasket qualification tournaments. His national team career high score is 26 points against Iceland in autumn 2012, during the EuroBasket 2013 qualification.

On 1 September 2013, Kangur and the Estonian national team gained a spot for the 2015 European Championships by beating Bulgaria in a two-legged final of the EuroBasket 2015 First Qualification Round. In September 2015, Estonia made its fifth appearance at the EuroBasket final tournament and the first since 2001. Kangur was the captain of the national team and played in all five games during the group stage averaging 7.4 points and 3.2 rebounds. Estonia won one game in Group D and was eliminated after the group stage.

From 2011 to 2016, Kangur was the captain of the Estonian national team. He withdrew from the team before the 2017 EuroBasket qualification tournament to treat his injuries and Rain Veideman was named the captain of the national team. Kangur was called back to the national team in 2017 and he also resumed his captaincy to lead the team in the 2019 World Cup qualification games.

Kangur and his long-time friends Janar Talts and Gregor Arbet played their national team farewell game on 21 February 2019 against Serbia. Estonia won the game 71–70, Kangur scored 4 points in 20 minutes.

== Honours ==
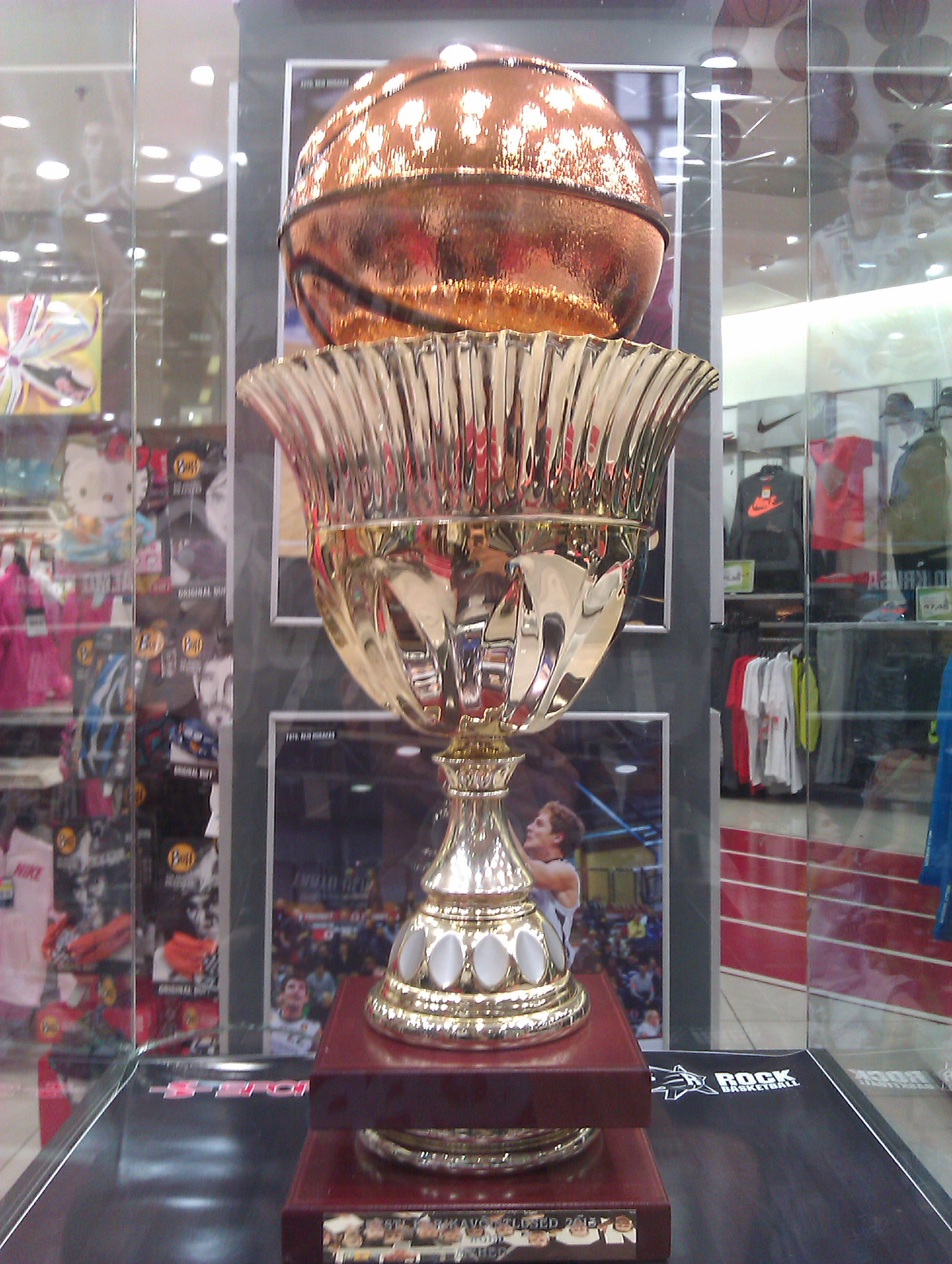
Kristjan Kangur has won the Estonian Cup four times in his career.

=== Club ===
Tallinna Kalev

- Korvpalli Meistriliiga: 2001–02, 2002–03
- Estonian Basketball Cup: 2001

Kalev/Cramo

- Korvpalli Meistriliiga: 2008–09, 2017–18, 2018–19
- Estonian Basketball Cup: 2006, 2007, 2008

ASVEL Basket

- French Supercup: 2009
- French League Cup: 2010

Montepaschi Siena

- Lega Basket Serie A: 2012–13
- Italian Basketball Cup: 2013

Emporio Armani Milano

- Lega Basket Serie A: 2013–14

=== Individual ===
- Estonian Basketball Player of the Year: 2009, 2010, 2011, 2012, 2013, 2014, 2015, 2016
- KML Finals Most Valuable Player: 2009, 2018
- All-KML First Team: 2003, 2007, 2008, 2009
- KML All-Star: 2004, 2007, 2018
- BBL All-Star: 2008

== Career statistics ==
Legend
GP	Games played	GS	Games started	MPG	Minutes per game
FG%	Field-goal percentage	3P%	3-point field-goal percentage	FT%	Free-throw percentage
RPG	Rebounds per game	APG	Assists per game	SPG	Steals per game
BPG	Blocks per game	PPG	Points per game	PIR	Performance index rating
**Bold**	Career high

=== EuroLeague ===
Year	Team	GP	GS	MPG	FG%	3P%	FT%	RPG	APG	SPG	BPG	PPG	PIR
2009–10	ASVEL Basket	10	0	14.8	**.600**	**.667**	.833	2.0	.7	.1	.1	5.9	4.9
2012–13	Montepaschi Siena	**24**	**13**	**23.8**	.450	.418	.833	**3.5**	**1.3**	**.7**	**.2**	**8.6**	**8.5**
2013–14	Emporio Armani Milano	17	0	16.8	.375	.368	**1.000**	1.9	.6	.4	.2	3.9	2.8
2015–16	Laboral Kutxa Baskonia	6	0	12.9	.444	.333	.500	1.8	.8	.0	.0	2.0	1.8
Career		57	13	18.9	.451	.424	.829	2.6	.9	.4	.1	6.0	5.5

=== Domestic leagues ===
Season	Team	League	GP	MPG	FG%	3P%	FT%	RPG	APG	SPG	BPG	PPG
2000–01	Tallinna Kalev	KML	32	14.4	.588	.000	.588	2.6	.4	.5	.2	5.8
2001–02	Tallinna Kalev	KML	27	10.7	.651	.000	.388	2.7	.8	.4	.4	4.8
2002–03	Tallinna Kalev	KML	38	25.3	.529	.413	.551	7.3	1.2	1.3	.4	11.2
2003–04	Tallinna Kalev	KML	21	32.6	.432	.336	.545	6.2	1.9	1.8	.5	15.7
2004–05	Bayer Giants Leverkusen	BBL	23	10.1	.487	.286	.500	2.3	.4	.2	.1	3.9
2005–06	Bayer Giants Leverkusen	BBL	30	16.1	.444	.220	.553	3.5	.9	.6	.3	6.5
2006–07	Kalev/Cramo	KML	27	22.4	.525	.232	.662	5.4	1.6	1.1	.4	9.3
2007–08	Kalev/Cramo	KML	26	28.1	.512	.353	.712	5.8	1.6	1.5	.2	13.3
2008–09	Kalev/Cramo	KML	30	26.3	.487	.427	.657	4.5	1.4	1.1	.2	11.8
2009–10	ASVEL Basket	Pro A	28	16.4	.388	.365	.833	2.2	.9	.4	.9	5.1
2009–10	Virtus Bologna	LBA	5	16.0	.941	1.000	.000	1.8	.2	1.0	.2	7.6
2010–11	Pallacanestro Varese	LBA	32	25.4	.436	.353	.788	5.4	.8	1.6	.2	9.9
2011–12	Pallacanestro Varese	LBA	36	28.5	.468	.409	.750	5.2	1.9	1.4	.4	10.9
2012–13	Montepaschi Siena	LBA	49	21.3	.445	.398	.600	3.7	1.0	.9	.1	7.4
2013–14	Emporio Armani Milano	LBA	39	14.8	.359	.323	.667	2.5	.6	.4	.1	3.7
2014–15	Pallacanestro Varese	LBA	18	31.4	.392	.414	.750	6.2	1.9	1.0	.2	7.8
2015–16	Laboral Kutxa Baskonia	ACB	3	16.0	.500	.200	–	3.3	.7	.3	.3	3.7
2015–16	Pallacanestro Varese	LBA	19	25.3	.569	.459	.732	3.9	1.6	.7	.1	8.1
2016–17	Pallacanestro Varese	LBA	30	24.2	.401	.254	.862	3.8	.9	.7	.2	5.3
2017–18	Kalev/Cramo	KML	31	19.8	.481	.245	.750	4.4	2.5	.7	.1	7.3
2018–19	Kalev/Cramo	LEBL	24	18.0	.462	.400	.740	4.0	2.0	.7	.0	6.1
2019–20	Kalev/Cramo	LEBL	17	16.0	.431	.333	.846	2.9	1.6	.6	.0	3.5
2020–21	TalTech	LEBL	14	25.7	.417	.264	.844	5.9	2.7	.6	.2	10.1
2020–21	Pärnu Sadam	LEBL										

=== Estonia national team ===
Year	Tournament	National Team	GP	GS	MPG	FG%	3P%	FT%	RPG	APG	SPG	BPG	PPG
2001	2002 U-20 European Championship Qualification	Estonia U-20	5		18.4	.469	.167	.286	4.0	.6	.4	.0	6.6
2002–03	EuroBasket 2003 Qualification	Estonia	4	0	11.5	.583	1.000	.333	1.8	.5	.2	.0	4.2
2005	EuroBasket 2005 Additional Qualifying Round	Estonia	4	1	26.5	.500	.143	.538	5.2	1.2	1.0	.2	9.5
2006	EuroBasket 2007 Qualification	Estonia	6	6	23.3	.273	.072	.435	5.5	.8	.8	.6	5.8
2007	EuroBasket 2007 Additional Qualifying Round	Estonia	4	4	28.2	.379	.500	.600	7.2	.7	.5	1.0	8.5
2008	EuroBasket 2009 Qualification	Estonia	6	6	32.3	.428	.529	.733	7.8	2.8	.6	.3	12.2
2009	EuroBasket 2009 Qualification Relegation Round	Estonia	6	6	30.3	.377	.214	.670	7.5	2.2	1.6	.0	12.0
2010–11	EuroBasket 2011 Division B	Estonia	6	6	26.6	.377	.304	.455	7.8	2.2	1.0	.5	10.5
2012	EuroBasket 2013 Qualification	Estonia	10	10	26.8	.495	.347	.857	5.0	2.7	1.0	.3	13.3
2013	EuroBasket 2015 First Qualification Round	Estonia	6	3	25.3	.319	.150	.818	7.2	1.0	1.7	.0	7.0
2015	EuroBasket 2015	Estonia	5	2	23.4	.344	.385	.909	3.2	1.0	.7	.0	7.4
2017	2019 Basketball World Cup Pre-Qualifiers	Estonia	4	2	26.1	.357	.182	.818	6.5	4.0	.3	.3	7.8
2018–19	2019 Basketball World Cup Qualification	Estonia	6	4	18.1	.481	.400	.571	3.5	1.7	.3	.2	6.3
