= Sten Sokk =

Estonian basketball player (born 1989)

No. 5 – Reinar Halliku Korvpallikool
- Position: Point guard
- League: Saku I liiga

Personal information
- Born: 14 February 1989 (age 37) Tallinn, then part of Estonian SSR, Soviet Union
- Listed height: 1.84 m (6 ft 0 in)
- Listed weight: 80 kg (176 lb)

Career information
- NBA draft: 2011: undrafted
- Playing career: 2005–present

Career history
- 2005–2006: Audentes/Noortekoondis
- 2006–2008: Triobet/Dalkia
- 2008–2012: Tartu Ülikool
- 2012–2013: Olimpi Tbilisi
- 2013–2014: Universitatea Craiova
- 2014: Rakvere Tarvas
- 2015: Dynamo Moscow
- 2015–2018: BC Kalev
- 2018–2019: Iraklis Thessaloniki
- 2019–2022: BC Kalev
- 2022–2023: Charilaos Trikoupis Messolonghi
- 2023–2024: Iraklis Thessaloniki
- 2024–present: Reinar Halliku Korvpallikool

Career highlights
- 4× Estonian League champion (2010, 2016–2018); 6× Estonian Cup winner (2009–2011, 2015, 2016, 2020); 3× Estonian League Best Young Player (2006–2008); 2× Estonian League First Team (2011, 2016)

Sten "Timmu" Sokk (born 14 February 1989) is an Estonian professional basketball player. He is a 1.84 m (6 ft 0 in) tall point guard. He represents the Estonian national basketball team internationally.

== Professional career ==
Sokk began playing basketball in his father's, Tiit Sokk's, basketball school. He began his professional career in 2005 with Noortekoondis/Audentes of the Korvpalli Meistriliiga. On his first season in the KML, Sokk averaged 7.04 points per game and won the KML Best Young Player Award.

In 2006, Sokk joined Dalkia/Nybit, coached by his father. He was named KML Best Young Player twice more in 2007 and 2008.

On 5 August 2008, Sokk joined TÜ/Rock, where he signed for the next four seasons. With TÜ/Rock, he won his first Estonian Championship in the 2009–10 season, after TÜ/Rock defeated Rakvere Tarvas 4 games to 2 in the finals and was named to the All-KML Team in the 2010–11 season.

In September 2012, he signed for Olimpi Tbilisi of the Georgian Superliga. Olimpi Tbilisi finished the 2012–13 season as runners-up.

On 3 August 2013, Sokk signed for Universitatea Craiova of the Liga Națională.

On 6 September 2014, Sokk signed for Rakvere Tarvas. On 22 December 2014, he left the club to join Dynamo Moscow of the Russian Basketball Super League, signing the contract on 9 January 2015.

On 17 September 2015, Sokk signed for Kalev/Cramo. He won his second Estonian Championship in the 2015–16 season, after Kalev/Cramo defeated his former team TÜ/Rock in the finals, and was named to the All-KML Team.

On 13 January 2022, Sokk signed for Charilaos Trikoupis Messolonghi B.C. and on 2023 he returned to Iraklis Thessaloniki B.C..

== Estonian national team ==
Sokk was a member of the Estonian national under-18 basketball team that competed at the 2007 FIBA Europe Under-18 Championship and finished the tournament in 12th place.

As a member of the senior Estonian national basketball team, Sokk competed at the EuroBasket 2015, averaging 6 points, 2.6 rebounds and 4.2 assists in 29 minutes per game. Estonia finished the tournament in 20th place.

== Personal life ==
Sokk's father, Tiit Sokk, is a basketball coach and a retired professional basketball player who won a gold medal in the 1988 Summer Olympics with the Soviet Union national basketball team. His older brother, Tanel, is also a professional basketball player and represents the Estonian national basketball team internationally.

== Awards and accomplishments ==
=== Professional career ===
TÜ/Rock

- Estonian League champion: 2010
- 3× Estonian Cup champion: 2009, 2010, 2011
- BBL Cup champion: 2010

Kalev/Cramo

- 3× Estonian League champion: 2016, 2017, 2018
- 2× Estonian Cup champion: 2015, 2016

=== Individual ===
- 3× KML Best Young Player: 2006, 2007, 2008
- 2× All-KML Team: 2011, 2016
