= Martin Müürsepp =

Estonian basketball player (born 1974)

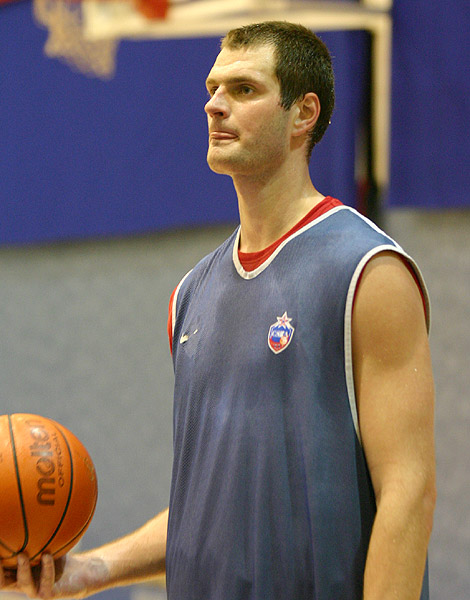
- Müürsepp with CSKA Moscow in 2004

BC Pärnu
- Title: Assistant coach
- League: Korvpalli Meistriliiga; Estonian-Latvian Basketball League; Europe Cup

Personal information
- Born: 26 September 1974 (age 52) Tallinn, then part of Estonian SSR, Soviet Union
- Listed height: 6 ft 9 in (2.06 m)
- Listed weight: 235 lb (107 kg)

Career information
- NBA draft: 1996: 1st round, 25th overall pick
- Drafted by: Utah Jazz
- Playing career: 1990–2010
- Position: Power forward / center
- Number: 31, 13
- Coaching career: 2010–present

Career history

Playing
- 1990: TPedI
- 1991: Andris
- 1992–1993: Alvik BBK
- 1993–1996: Maccabi Tel Aviv
- 1993–1994: →Maccabi Darom Tel Aviv
- 1994–1995: →Hapoel Haifa
- 1995–1996: →Kalev
- 1996–1997: Miami Heat
- 1997–1998: Dallas Mavericks
- 1998: Nybit
- 1999: Aris Thessaloniki
- 1999–2001: AEK Athens
- 2001–2002: UNICS Kazan
- 2002: Dynamo Moscow
- 2002–2003: Ural Great Perm
- 2003–2004: UNICS Kazan
- 2004–2005: CSKA Moscow
- 2005–2006: UNICS Kazan
- 2006–2007: Tartu Ülikool
- 2007: Melbourne Tigers
- 2008–2009: Kalev
- 2010: Rakvere Tarvas

Coaching
- 2010–2017: Kalev (assistant)
- 2013: Belarus (assistant)
- 2018–2019: Tallinna Kalev/TLÜ (assistant)
- 2019–2021: Tallinna Kalev/TLÜ
- 2021: Tallinna Kalev/TLÜ (assistant)
- 2021–2022: Rakvere Tarvas
- 2022–2024: Pärnu (assistant)
- 2024–2026: Haljala NGU
- 2026–present: Pärnu (assistant)

Career highlights
- As player: FIBA Saporta Cup champion (2000); FIBA Europe League champion (2004); FIBA Europe League Finals MVP (2004); 2× Estonian League champion (1996, 2007); 2× Estonian Cup winner (1991, 1996); 2× Greek Cup winner (2000, 2001); Russian League champion (2005); Russian Cup winner (2005); 4× Estonian Player of the Year (1996, 2001, 2004, 2005); As assistant coach: 6× Estonian League champion (2011–2014, 2016, 2017); 2× Estonian Cup winner (2015, 2016); As head coach: Estonian League Newcomer of the Year (2019)

Career NBA statistics
- Points: 389 (4.7 ppg)
- Rebounds: 181 (2.2 rpg)
- Assists: 50 (0.6 apg)
- Stats at NBA.com
- Stats at Basketball Reference

Martin Müürsepp (Estonian pronunciation: [ˈmɑrˈtin ˈmyːrˈsepˑ]; born 26 September 1974) is an Estonian professional basketball coach and former player, who currently serves as an assistant coach for BC Pärnu of the Korvpalli Meistriliiga. Widely regarded as one of Estonia's greatest basketball players of all time, he is the first Estonian to have played in the National Basketball Association (NBA).

Müürsepp won the FIBA Saporta Cup in 2000, and the FIBA Europe League in 2004, earning the Europe League Finals MVP award in the process. He represented the senior Estonian national team internationally.

== Early life ==
Müürsepp was born in Tallinn, to Hilja Volter, who worked in a barbecue restaurant, and Suido Müürsepp, a truck driver. He attended the Tallinn Secondary School No. 39, the Tallinn Secondary School No. 43, and the Tallinn Secondary School No. 49, leaving without graduating in 1991. Müürsepp started playing basketball when he was nine years old. His first coach was Andres Sõber. He made his Estonian League debut in 1990, at age 15, playing for TPedI. In 1991, Müürsepp won the Estonian Cup with Andris.

== Professional career ==
=== Early years (1992–1996) ===
In 1992, Müürsepp joined Alvik BBK of the Swedish League.

In 1993, Müürsepp signed a 12-year, $5 million contract with Israeli powerhouse Maccabi Tel Aviv. He subsequently played for Maccabi Tel Aviv's farm team Maccabi Darom Tel Aviv and Hapoel Haifa. In 1995, Müürsepp was loaned to Estonian champions BC Kalev for the 1995–1996 season. Müürsepp helped BC Kalev to defend the league title and win the Estonian Cup. He averaged 16.9 points, 6.2 rebounds and 1.0 assists per game in the league.

=== Miami Heat (1996–1997) ===
On 26 June 1996, Müürsepp was selected with the 25th overall pick in the 1996 NBA draft by the Utah Jazz. The Jazz then traded him to the Miami Heat for a 2000 first-round draft pick. On 12 September 1996, Müürsepp signed a three-year, $1.8 million contract with the Heat. Müürsepp made his NBA debut on 21 December 1996, playing the final 82 seconds of the game and recording 2 points, one rebound and one assist in a 86–66 victory over the Houston Rockets. He appeared in 10 games, and averaged 1.7 points, 0.5 rebounds and 0.3 assists per game for the Heat.

=== Dallas Mavericks (1997–1998) ===
On 14 February 1997, the Heat traded Müürsepp, Predrag Danilović and Kurt Thomas to the Dallas Mavericks in exchange for Jamal Mashburn. He made his debut for the Mavericks a day later, scoring 2 points in a 99–84 loss against the Utah Jazz. In the 1996–97 season, Müürsepp averaged 4.3 points, 1.9 rebounds and 0.5 assists per game for the Mavericks. He missed the first 14 games of the 1997–98 season due to a foot injury. On 5 March 1998, Müürsepp scored a career-high 24 points in a 119–109 win over the Los Angeles Clippers. He appeared in 41 games, with 7 starts, for the team during the 1997–98 season, averaging 5.7 points, 2.8 rebounds, 0.7 assists and 0.7 steals per game.

=== NBA lockout (1998–1999) ===
On 24 June 1998, the Mavericks traded Müürsepp, Pat Garrity, Bubba Wells and a 1999 first-round draft pick to the Phoenix Suns for Steve Nash. Due to the 1998–99 NBA lockout, the season did not start until 5 February 1999. During the lockout, Müürsepp made two appearances in the Estonian League, playing for Nybit. The Estonian Basketball Association was subsequently fined for allowing him to play without the permission of FIBA. On 23 January 1999, the Suns traded Müürsepp, Mark Bryant, Bubba Wells and a 1999 first-round draft pick to the Chicago Bulls for Luc Longley.

=== Greece (1999–2001) ===
On 1 February 1999, Müürsepp signed with Aris Thessaloniki of the Greek League. In May 1999, he was suspended by the Hellenic Basketball Association for three months for use of ephedrine.

On 15 July 1999, Müürsepp signed with AEK Athens on a one-year, $700,000 contract with an option to extend for another season. He helped AEK win the FIBA Saporta Cup in 2000 and back-to-back Greek Cups in 2000 and 2001. The team also reached the 2001 Euroleague semifinals where they were eliminated by Baskonia. In 17 Euroleague games, Müürsepp recorded 8.6 points, 4.9 rebounds and 0.7 assists per game.

=== Russia (2001–2006) ===
In September 2001, Müürsepp signed a one-year contract with Russian club UNICS Kazan.

On 14 August 2002, Müürsepp signed with Dynamo Moscow on a one-year contract. However, he left the club in November 2002 after they failed to pay his wages for the second month in a row. In December 2002, Müürsepp signed with Ural Great Perm for the remainder of the season.

On 18 June 2003, Müürsepp re-signed with UNICS Kazan. In the 2003–04 FIBA Europe League season, he led the team to their first European trophy in the club's history and was named the Europe League Finals MVP, scoring a game-high 22 points in 87–63 victory over Maroussi.

On 17 June 2004, Müürsepp signed a one-year contract with Russian powerhouse CSKA Moscow. He helped the team win the Russian League and the Russian Cup titles in 2005. CSKA Moscow also reached 2005 Euroleague Final Four, but lost in the semifinal against Baskonia and then to Panathinaikos in the third-place game. Over 24 Euroleague games, Müürsepp averaged 8.0 points, 3.3 rebounds and 0.9 assists per game.

On 11 July 2005, Müürsepp returned to UNICS Kazan for a second time, signing a one-year contract.

=== Final years (2006–2010) ===
On 27 June 2006, Müürsepp returned to Estonia by signing a one-year contract with Tartu Ülikool/Rock. He helped TÜ/Rock win the Estonian League title in 2007, averaging 11.2 points, 5.1 rebounds and 1.9 assists per game.

On 23 August 2007, Müürsepp signed a one-year contract with the Melbourne Tigers of the National Basketball League (NBL). He was released by the Tigers in December 2007 after picking up an ankle injury.

On 28 February 2008, Müürsepp signed with BC Kalev/Cramo while still recovering from his ankle injury. He left BC Kalev/Cramo after the 2008–09 season without playing in a single official game for the club.

On 26 February 2010, Müürsepp joined BC Rakvere Tarvas, where he was reunited with Andres Sõber, his first coach. He retired after the 2009–10 season.

== National team career ==
Müürsepp was a member of the Soviet Union junior national team that finished fifth at the 1991 European Championship for Cadets, averaging 10.6 points per game. He also represented the Estonian junior national team.

Müürsepp made his debut for the senior Estonia national basketball team in 1993. He was an integral part of the Estonian team that qualified for the 2001 European Championship, where they lost all three of their preliminary round games and finished 14th. Müürsepp, who led the team in scoring, averaged 18.3 points, 5.7 rebounds and 0.7 assists per game. He finished his national team career in 2007.

== Coaching career ==
Müürsepp began his coaching career in 2010 as an assistant coach for BC Kalev/Cramo, a position he held until November 2017. He won six Estonian League titles and two Estonian Cups with BC Kalev/Cramo.

In 2013, Müürsepp served as an assistant coach for the Belarus national basketball team during the EuroBasket 2015 first qualification round.

On 6 January 2018, Müürsepp was named as an assistant coach for Tallinna Kalev/TLÜ under new head coach Gert Kullamäe. He was promoted to the head coach position in January 2019 following Kullamäe's mid-season departure. Müürsepp guided Tallinna Kalev/TLÜ to their first-ever KML Finals in 2019, for which he was named KML Newcomer of the Year.

On 1 July 2021, Müürsepp was hired as head coach of Rakvere Tarvas. The team finished the 2021–22 Estonian-Latvian Basketball League season in 13th place.

On 21 November 2022, Müürsepp was hired as assistant coach of Pärnu Sadam, where he was reunited with head coach Gert Kullamäe.

On 20 August 2024, Müürsepp was hired as head coach of Haljala NGU in Saku 2 liiga.

== Career statistics ==
Legend
| GP | Games played | GS | Games started | MPG | Minutes per game |
| FG% | Field-goal percentage | 3P% | 3-point field-goal percentage | FT% | Free-throw percentage |
| RPG | Rebounds per game | APG | Assists per game | SPG | Steals per game |
| BPG | Blocks per game | PPG | Points per game | PIR | Performance index rating |
| **Bold** | Career high |

=== NBA ===
==== Regular season ====
| Year | Team | GP | GS | MPG | FG% | 3P% | FT% | RPG | APG | SPG | BPG | PPG |
|---|---|---|---|---|---|---|---|---|---|---|---|---|
| 1996–97 | Miami | 10 | 0 | 2.9 | .357 | .250 | .429 | .5 | .3 | .0 | .1 | 1.7 |
| 1996–97 | Dallas | 32 | 0 | 10.0 | .419 | .150 | .679 | 1.9 | .5 | .4 | **.3** | 4.3 |
| 1997–98 | Dallas | **41** | **7** | **14.7** | **.435** | **.421** | **.761** | **2.8** | **.7** | **.7** | **.3** | **5.7** |
| Career | | 83 | 7 | 11.5 | .425 | .323 | .693 | 2.2 | .6 | .5 | .3 | 4.7 |

=== Euroleague ===
| Year | Team | GP | GS | MPG | FG% | 3P% | FT% | RPG | APG | SPG | BPG | PPG | PIR |
|---|---|---|---|---|---|---|---|---|---|---|---|---|---|
| 2000–01 | AEK Athens | 17 | **14** | **21.5** | .423 | .235 | .490 | **4.9** | .7 | **.9** | **.2** | **8.6** | 7.0 |
| 2004–05 | CSKA Moscow | **24** | 6 | 17.5 | **.528** | **.462** | **.645** | 3.3 | **.9** | .7 | **.2** | 8.0 | **7.6** |
| Career | | 41 | 20 | 19.1 | .475 | .333 | .575 | 4.0 | .8 | .8 | .2 | 8.3 | 7.4 |

== See also ==
- List of European basketball players in the United States
- List of foreign NBA players
