= KML Finals Most Valuable Player Award =

Estonian sport award

The KML Finals Most Valuable Player Award (Estonian: Korvpalli Meistriliiga finaalseeria kõige väärtuslikum mängija) is an award for the top-tier professional basketball league in Estonia, the Korvpalli Meistriliiga (KML).

== Winners ==
Season	Player	Team
2005–06	(United States) James Williams	BC Kalev/Cramo
2006–07	(Estonia) Tanel Tein	Tartu Ülikool/Rock
2007–08	(United States) Brian Cusworth	Tartu Ülikool/Rock
2008–09	(Estonia) Kristjan Kangur	BC Kalev/Cramo
2009–10	(Estonia) Janar Talts	Tartu Ülikool/Rock
2010–11	(Latvia) Armands Šķēle	BC Kalev/Cramo
2011–12	(Estonia) Tanel Sokk	BC Kalev/Cramo
2012–13	(Estonia) Tanel Sokk	BC Kalev/Cramo
2013–14	(Romania) Vlad Moldoveanu	BC Kalev/Cramo
2014–15	(Estonia) Tanel Kurbas	Tartu Ülikool/Rock
2015–16	(Latvia) Rolands Freimanis	BC Kalev/Cramo
2016–17	(Bulgaria) Branko Mirković	BC Kalev/Cramo
2017–18	(Estonia) Kristjan Kangur	BC Kalev/Cramo
2018–19	(Bulgaria) Branko Mirković	BC Kalev/Cramo
2020–21	(United States) Chavaughn Lewis	BC Kalev/Cramo
2021–22	(Latvia) Andris Misters	Pärnu Sadam
2022–23	(Ukraine) Oleksandr Kovliar	BC Kalev/Cramo
2023–24	(United States) Ben Shungu	BC Kalev/Cramo
2024–25	(Finland) Severi Kaukiainen	BC Kalev/Cramo
2025–26	(United States) Bryce McBride	Tartu Ülikool Maks & Moorits

== See also ==
- Korvpalli Meistriliiga
- KML Most Valuable Player Award
- KML Best Defender Award
- KML Best Young Player Award
- KML Coach of the Year
- KML All-Star Five
