= KML Most Valuable Player Award =

Estonian sport award

The KML Most Valuable Player Award (Estonian: Korvpalli Meistriliiga kõige väärtuslikum mängija) is an award for the top-tier professional basketball league in Estonia, the Korvpalli Meistriliiga (KML).

== Winners ==
=== MVP ===
Season	Player	Team
1996–97	(Estonia) Rauno Pehka	BC Tallinn
1997–98	(Estonia) Gert Kullamäe	BC Kalev
1998–99	(Estonia) Aivar Kuusmaa	BC Tallinn
1999–00	(Estonia) Gert Kullamäe (2)	Tallinna Kalev
2000–01	(Estonia) Tanel Tein	Tartu Ülikool-Delta
2001–02	(Estonia) Tanel Tein	Tartu Rock
2002–03	(Estonia) Aivar Kuusmaa (2)	TTÜ/A. Le Coq
2003–04	(Lithuania) Augenijus Vaškys	Tartu Ülikool/Rock
2004–05	(United States) Howard Frier	Ehitustööriist
2005–06	(Estonia) Tanel Tein (3)	Tartu Ülikool/Rock
2006–07	(United States) Travis Reed	BC Kalev/Cramo
2007–08	(United States) Brian Cusworth	Tartu Ülikool/Rock

=== Regular Season MVP ===
Season	Player	Team
2016–17	(Netherlands) Thomas van der Mars	AVIS UTILITAS Rapla

== Players with most awards ==
Player	Editions	Notes
(Estonia) Tanel Tein	3	2001, 2002, 2006
(Estonia) Aivar Kuusmaa	2	1999, 2003
(Estonia) Gert Kullamäe	2	1998, 2000

== See also ==
- Korvpalli Meistriliiga
- KML Finals Most Valuable Player Award
- KML Best Defender Award
- KML Best Young Player Award
- KML Coach of the Year
- KML All-Star Five
