= Tanel Sokk =

Estonian basketball player (born 1985)

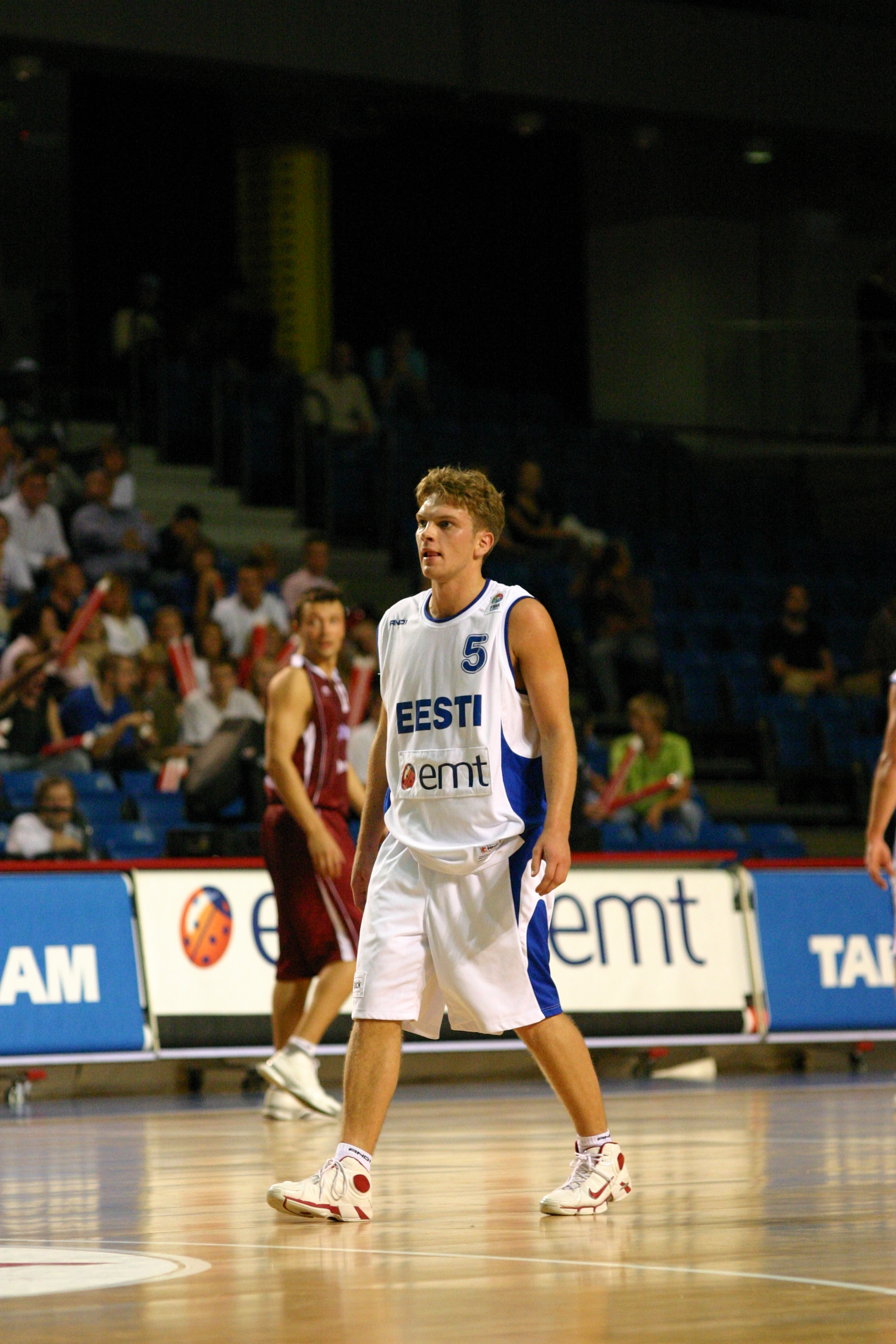
- Sokk in 2006

TalTech
- Title: Assistant coach
- League: Korvpalli Meistriliiga; Latvian–Estonian Basketball League; European North Basketball League

Personal information
- Born: 20 January 1985 (age 41) Tallinn, then part of Estonian SSR, Soviet Union
- Listed height: 1.88 m (6 ft 2 in)
- Listed weight: 84 kg (185 lb)

Career information
- NBA draft: 2007: undrafted
- Playing career: 2002–2022
- Position: Point guard

Career history

Playing
- 2002–2006: Nybit
- 2006–2014: BC Kalev
- 2014–2018: Tartu Ülikool
- 2018–2019: BC Kalev
- 2019–2020: Tallinna Kalev/TLÜ
- 2020–2022: Taltech

Coaching
- 2025–present: TalTech (assistant)

Career highlights
- Titles: 7× Estonian League champion (2009, 2011–2015, 2019); 4× Estonian Cup winner (2006–2008, 2014); Awards: 2× Estonian League Finals MVP (2012–2013); VTB United League Top Estonian Player (2013); Estonian League Best Young Player (2003); 3× Estonian League First Team (2006, 2012–2013)
Medals
Men's basketball
Assistant Coach for Estonia
FIBA Europe U-18 Championship Division B
Silver medal – second place	2025 Romania	U18 Team

Tanel Sokk (born 20 January 1985) is a former Estonian professional basketball player who currently serves as an assistant coach for TalTech of the Korvpalli Meistriliiga and the Estonian-Latvian Basketball League. Standing at 1.88 m (6 ft 2 in), he played at the point guard position. He has also represented the Estonian national basketball team internationally.

== Professional career ==
Sokk began playing basketball in his father's, Tiit Sokk's, basketball school. He began his professional career in 2002 with Nybit of the Korvpalli Meistriliiga, coached by his father. On his first season in the KML, Sokk averaged 13.12 points per game and won the KML Best Young Player Award.

Dalkia/Nybit finished the 2005–06 season in third place. Sokk averaged 14.22 points per game and was named to the All-KML Team.

In 2006, Sokk signed for Kalev/Cramo. He won his first Estonian Championship in the 2008–09 season, when Kalev/Cramo defeated TÜ/Rock 4 games to 2 in the KML Finals. From 2011 to 2014, Sokk won four consecutive Estonian Championships with Kalev/Cramo. In 2012 and 2013, he won the KML Finals Most Valuable Player Award and was named to the All-KML Team.

Sokk joined TÜ/Rock for the 2014–15 season but had to postpone his debut for the team until 17 October 2014 due to an injury. He won his sixth Estonian Championship, after TÜ/Rock defeated his former team Kalev/Cramo in the KML Finals, winning the series 4 games to 1.

== Estonian national team ==
As a member of the senior Estonian national basketball team, Sokk competed at the EuroBasket 2015, averaging 1 point and 0.5 rebounds per game, in 8.5 minutes. Estonia finished the tournament in 20th place.

== Personal life ==
Sokk's father, Tiit Sokk, is a basketball coach and a retired professional basketball player who won a gold medal in the 1988 Summer Olympics with the Soviet Union national basketball team. His younger brother, Sten, is also a professional basketball player and represents the Estonian national basketball team internationally.

== Awards and accomplishments ==
=== Professional career ===
Kalev/Cramo

- 6× Estonian League champion: 2009, 2011, 2012, 2013, 2014, 2019
- 3× Estonian Cup champion: 2006, 2007, 2008

University of Tartu

- Estonian League champion: 2015
- Estonian Cup champion: 2014

=== Individual ===
- 2× KML Finals Most Valuable Player Award: 2012, 2013
- KML Best Young Player Award: 2003
- 3× All-KML Team: 2006, 2012, 2013
- VTB United League Top Estonian Player: 2013
