= 2005–06 KML season =

Estonian national championships in basketball

SEB Korvpalli Meistriliiga^{1}
- Season: 2005–06
- Duration: 5 October 2005 – 30 May 2006
- Teams: 7

Regular season
- Top seed: BC Kalev/Cramo
- Season MVP: (Estonia) Tanel Tein

Finals
- Champions: BC Kalev/Cramo; 2nd title
- Runners-up: TÜ/Rock
- Third place: Dalkia/Nybit
- Fourth place: Pirita BM
- Finals MVP: (United States) James Williams

Awards
- Best Young Player: (Estonia) Sten Sokk
- Coach of the Year: (Estonia) Aivar Kuusmaa

Statistical leaders
Points	(United States) J. S. Nash	15.37
Rebounds	(Lithuania) Saulius Dumbliauskas	9.00
Assists	(Estonia) Tanel Sokk	3.96
- ^{1} Sponsored league name, referring to SEB.

The 2005–06 SEB Korvpalli Meistriliiga was the 15th season of the Estonian basketball league and the second under the title sponsorship of SEB. Including the competition's previous incarnations, this was the 81st season of the Estonian men's basketball league.

The season started on 5 October 2005 and concluded on 30 May 2006 with BC Kalev/Cramo defeating TÜ/Rock 4 games to 3 in the 2006 KML Finals to win their 2nd Estonian League title.

== Regular season ==
=== League table ===
Pos	Team	Pld	W	L	Pts	PCT	Qualification
1	BC Kalev/Cramo	24	21	3	45	.875	Qualification to Play-offs
2	TÜ/Rock	24	18	6	42	.750	Qualification to Play-offs
3	Dalkia/Nybit	24	16	8	40	.667	Qualification to Play-offs
4	Pirita BM	24	16	8	40	.667	Qualification to Play-offs
5	Rakvere PK	24	9	15	33	.375	Qualification to Play-offs
6	Rapla	24	4	20	28	.167	Qualification to Play-offs
7	Noortekoondis/Audentes	24	0	24	24	.000	

== Play-offs ==
=== Bracket ===
Quarter-finals
4	Pirita BM	2
5	Rakvere PK	0
3	Dalkia/Nybit	2
6	Rapla	0

Semi-finals
1	BC Kalev/Cramo	3
4	Pirita BM	0
2	TÜ/Rock	3
3	Dalkia/Nybit	2

Finals
1	BC Kalev/Cramo	4
2	TÜ/Rock	3
Third place
3	Dalkia/Nybit	2
4	Pirita BM	0

== Awards ==
=== MVP ===
- (Estonia) Tanel Tein (TÜ/Rock)

=== Finals MVP ===
- (United States) James Williams (BC Kalev/Cramo)

=== Best Young Player Award ===
- (Estonia) Sten Sokk (Noortekoondis/Audentes)

=== Coach of the Year ===
- (Estonia) Aivar Kuusmaa (BC Kalev/Cramo)

=== KML All-Star Five ===
Pos	Player	Team
PG	(Estonia) Tanel Sokk	Dalkia/Nybit
SG	(Estonia) Tanel Tein	TÜ/Rock
SF	(Estonia) Gregor Arbet	Dalkia/Nybit
PF	(Estonia) Rait Keerles	BC Kalev/Cramo
C	(Estonia) Vallo Allingu	TÜ/Rock
