= Tanel Tein =

Estonian basketball player

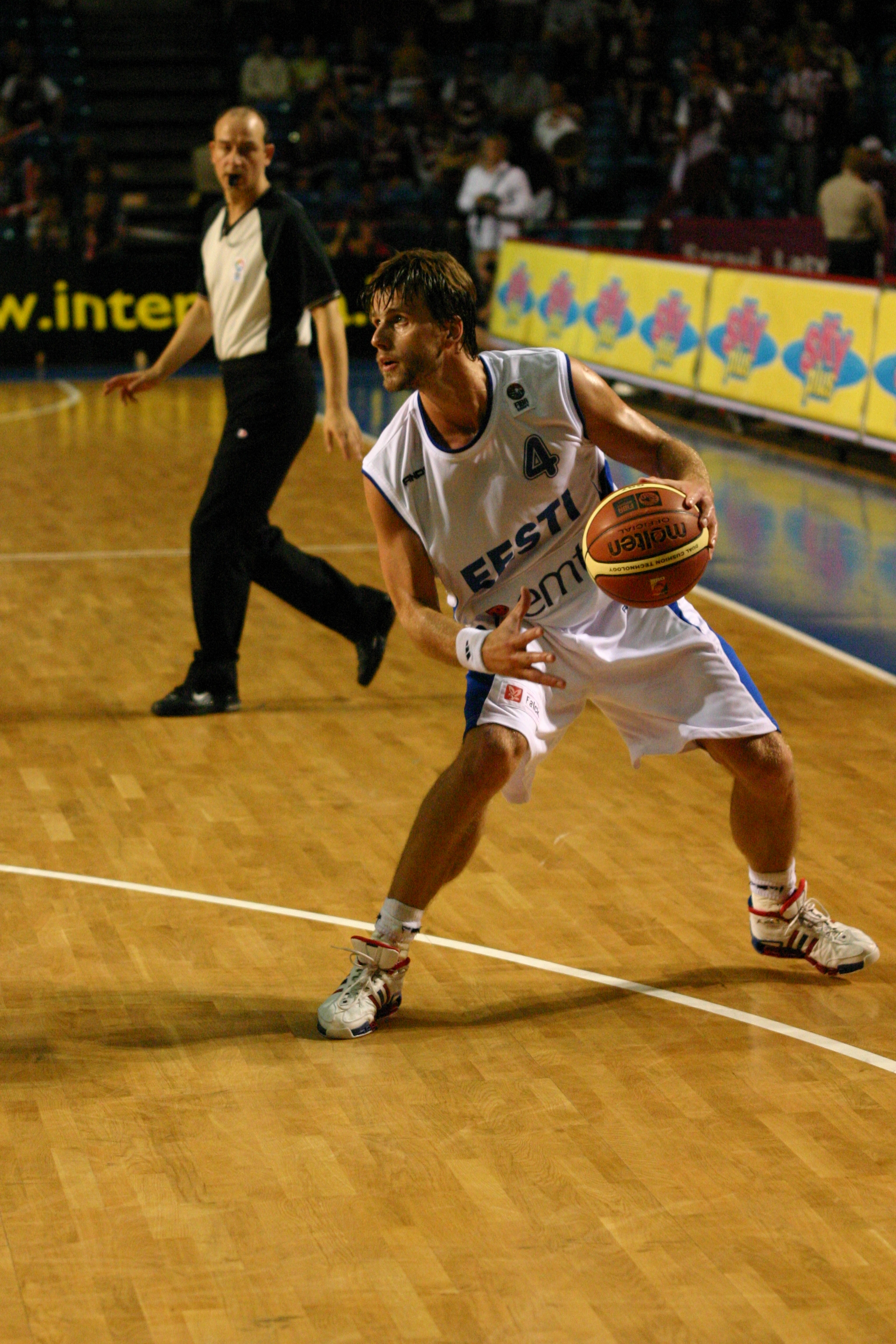
- Tein playing for Estonia in 2006

Personal information
- Born: 10 January 1978 (age 48) Tartu, then part of Estonian SSR, Soviet Union
- Listed height: 1.93 m (6 ft 4 in)
- Listed weight: 94 kg (207 lb)

Career information
- College: St. Francis (NY) (1998–1999)
- Playing career: 1993–2010
- Position: Shooting guard

Career history
- 1993–1998: Tartu
- 1999–2003: University of Tartu
- 2003–2004: Śląsk Wrocław
- 2004–2005: Alba Berlin
- 2005: Dynamo Moscow Region
- 2005–2010: University of Tartu

Career highlights
- 5× Estonian League champion (2000, 2001, 2007, 2008, 2010); 3× Estonian Cup winner (2000–2002); Polish Cup winner (2004); Estonian Player of the Year (2008); 3× Estonian League MVP (2001, 2002, 2006); Estonian League Play-offs MVP (2000); Estonian League Finals MVP (2007); 4× All-Estonian League Team (2001, 2006–2008)

Tanel Tein (born 10 January 1978) is an Estonian politician and former professional basketball player. He was named Estonian Player of the Year in 2008. Tein played one season of college basketball for the St. Francis Terriers.

== Professional career ==
Tein started his career playing for hometown team Tartu in 1993 and led them to two Estonian championships (2000, 2001) and three Estonian Cups (2000–2002). In July 2003, he signed with Śląsk Wrocław of the Polish Basketball League and the Euroleague, and won the Polish Cup in 2004. Tein subsequently played for Alba Berlin and Dynamo Moscow Region, before returning to University of Tartu in November 2005. He went on to win three more Estonian championships in 2007, 2008, 2010.

== National team career ==
Tein began playing for the Estonian national basketball team in 1998. He played with Estonia at the EuroBasket 2001, averaging 5.3 points, 2.7 rebounds and 2.7 assists per game. The team finished the tournament with a 0–3 record for 14th place.

== Controversy ==
On 11 June 2010, Tein attracted media attention after being brought down by rescuers from a pedestrian bridge in Tartu, where he had fallen asleep drunk.

== Career statistics ==
Legend
GP	Games played	GS	Games started	MPG	Minutes per game
FG%	Field-goal percentage	3P%	3-point field-goal percentage	FT%	Free-throw percentage
RPG	Rebounds per game	APG	Assists per game	SPG	Steals per game
BPG	Blocks per game	PPG	Points per game	PIR	Performance index rating
**Bold**	Career high

=== Euroleague ===
Year	Team	GP	GS	MPG	FG%	3P%	FT%	RPG	APG	SPG	BPG	PPG	PIR
2003–04	Śląsk Wrocław	14	14	29.9	.413	.315	.875	2.9	.8	1.2	.1	8.1	7.9

=== College ===
Year	Team	GP	GS	MPG	FG%	3P%	FT%	RPG	APG	SPG	BPG	PPG
1998–99	St. Francis (NY)	26	...	...	.418	.452	.813	2.3	1.6	.8	.2	5.3

== Awards and accomplishments ==
- 5× Estonian League champion: 2000, 2001, 2007, 2008, 2010
- 3× Estonian Cup winner: 2000, 2001, 2002
- Polish Cup winner: 2004
- Estonian Player of the Year: 2008
- 3× Estonian League MVP: 2001, 2002, 2006
- Estonian League Play-offs MVP: 2000
- Estonian League Finals MVP: 2007
- 4× All-Estonian League Team: 2001, 2006, 2008, 2008
