= 1927 KML season =

1927 Estonian national championships in basketball

Korvpalli Meistriliiga
- Season: 1927
- Duration: 12 February 1927 – 27 March 1927
- Games played: 6
- Teams: 4

Finals
- Champions: Tallinna Kalev; 1st title
- Runners-up: Tallinna Sport
- Third place: Tallinna NMKÜ
- Fourth place: Tallinna Võitleja

The 1927 Korvpalli Meistriliiga was the 2nd season of the Estonian basketball league.

The season started on 12 February 1927 and concluded on 27 March 1927 with Tallinna Kalev winning their 1st Estonian League title.
