= 2016–17 KML season =

Estonian national championships in basketball

Alexela Korvpalli Meistriliiga^{1}
- Season: 2016–17
- Duration: 2 October 2016 – 22 May 2017
- Games played: 110 (Regular season); 26 (Playoffs)
- Teams: 9
- TV partner(s): TV6, Delfi TV

Regular season
- Top seed: BC Kalev/Cramo
- Season MVP: (Netherlands) Thomas van der Mars

Finals
- Champions: BC Kalev/Cramo (9th title)
- Runners-up: AVIS UTILITAS Rapla
- Third place: Tartu Ülikool
- Fourth place: Pärnu Sadam
- Finals MVP: (Bulgaria) Branko Mirković

Awards
- Best Defender: (Estonia) Mihkel Kirves
- Best Young Player: (Estonia) Siim-Markus Post
- Coach of the Year: (Estonia) Aivar Kuusmaa

Statistical leaders
Points	(Serbia) Đorđe Dželetović	18.31
Rebounds	(Netherlands) Thomas van der Mars	12.32
Assists	(Estonia) Tanel Sokk	5.32
- ^{1}Sponsored league name, referring to Alexela.

The 2016–17 Korvpalli Meistriliiga season (also known as the Alexela Korvpalli Meistriliiga for sponsorship reasons) was the 92nd season of top-tier basketball in Estonia. BC Kalev/Cramo came into the season as defending champions of the 2015–16 season.

The season began on 2 October 2016 and concluded on 22 May 2017 with BC Kalev/Cramo defeating AVIS UTILITAS Rapla 4 games to 0 in the finals to win their 9th Estonian Championship.

== Teams ==
=== Venues and locations ===
Locations of the 2016–17 Korvpalli Meistriliiga teams

Team	Home city	Arena	Capacity
AVIS UTILITAS Rapla	Rapla	Sadolin Sports Hall	818
BC Kalev/Cramo	Tallinn	Saku Suurhall	7,200
BC Valga-Valka/Maks & Moorits	Valga	Valga Sports Hall	561
G4S Noorteliiga	Tallinn	Audentes Sports Center	1,030
Pärnu Sadam	Pärnu	Pärnu Sports Hall	1,820
Rakvere Tarvas/Palmse Metall	Rakvere	Rakvere Sports Hall	2,747
Tartu Ülikool	Tartu	University of Tartu Sports Hall	1,650
TLÜ/Kalev	Tallinn	Audentes Sports Center	1,030
TTÜ KK	Tallinn	TTÜ Sports Hall	1,000

=== Personnel and sponsorship ===
Team	Head coach	Captain	Kit manufacturer	Shirt sponsor
AVIS UTILITAS Rapla	(Estonia) Aivar Kuusmaa	(Estonia) Indrek Kajupank	Spalding	Avis
BC Kalev/Cramo	(Estonia) Alar Varrak	(Estonia) Gregor Arbet	Nike	Cramo
BC Valga-Valka/Maks & Moorits	(Latvia) Kristaps Zeids	(Estonia) Renato Lindmets	SMV	Maks & Moorits
G4S Noorteliiga	(Estonia) Indrek Visnapuu	(Estonia) Karl Robin Jürjens	Peak	G4S
Pärnu Sadam	(Estonia) Heiko Rannula	(Estonia) Silver Leppik	Nike	Port of Pärnu
Rakvere Tarvas/Palmse Metall	(Estonia) Andres Sõber	(Estonia) Mario Paiste	Nike	Rakvere
Tartu Ülikool	(Estonia) Gert Kullamäe	(Estonia) Tanel Sokk	Nike	University of Tartu
TLÜ/Kalev	(Estonia) Raido Roos	(Estonia) Reimo Tamm	Peak	City of Tallinn
TTÜ KK	(Estonia) Rait Käbin	(Estonia) Kiur Akenpärg	Erreà	Tallinn University of Technology

=== Coaching changes ===
Team	Outgoing coach	Manner of departure	Date of vacancy	Position in table	Incoming coach	Date of appointment
Pärnu Sadam	(Estonia) Mait Käbin	Mutual consent	1 June 2016	Pre-season	(Estonia) Heiko Rannula	1 September 2016
TLÜ/Kalev	(Estonia) Kalle Klandorf	Mutual consent	1 January 2017	8th	(Estonia) Raido Roos	1 January 2017
BC Valga-Valka/Maks & Moorits	(Latvia) Juris Umbraško	Sacked	10 February 2017	8th	(Latvia) Kristaps Zeids	10 February 2017

== Regular season ==
During the regular season teams will play 4 rounds for 32 games (2 at home and 2 away) with following exceptions:

- Tartu Ülikool will play 1 round at home against teams other than BC Kalev/Cramo (1 round at home and 2 rounds away in total).
- BC Kalev/Cramo will play 2 rounds away against teams other than Tartu Ülikool (2 rounds away in total).
- G4S Noorteliiga will play 2 rounds (1 round at home and 1 round away in total).

Double points will be awarded to teams winning those games.

=== League table ===
Pos	Team	Pld	W	L	Pts	PCT	Qualification
1	BC Kalev/Cramo	32	29	3	61	.906	Qualification to Playoffs
2	Tartu Ülikool	32	29	3	61	.906	Qualification to Playoffs
3	AVIS UTILITAS Rapla	32	20	12	52	.625	Qualification to Playoffs
4	Pärnu Sadam	32	17	15	49	.531	Qualification to Playoffs
5	TTÜ KK	32	16	16	48	.500	Qualification to Playoffs
6	BC Valga-Valka/Maks & Moorits	32	12	20	44	.375	Qualification to Playoffs
7	TLÜ/Kalev	32	12	20	44	.375	Qualification to Playoffs
8	Rakvere Tarvas/Palmse Metall	32	9	23	41	.281	Qualification to Playoffs
9	G4S Noorteliiga	32	0	32	32	.000	

Source: Korvpalli Meistriliiga

=== Results ===
Home \ Away	RAP	KAL	VAL	G4S	PÄR	TRV	TRT	TLK	TTÜ
AVIS UTILITAS Rapla		82–66	87–59	83–57	75–62	90–67	73–79	79–76	101–91
AVIS UTILITAS Rapla		77–80	80–78		93–91	92–57	65–68	63–70	89–83
BC Kalev/Cramo							86–63		
BC Kalev/Cramo							85–75		
BC Valga-Valka/Maks & Moorits	76–82	73–79		108–53	80–91	89–106	67–89	77–74	78–92
BC Valga-Valka/Maks & Moorits	70–72	76–83			89–99	100–70	56–82	87–103	66–68
G4S Noorteliiga	64–81	69–102	75–80		69–83	75–107	59–102	62–87	64–71
G4S Noorteliiga		59–112							
Pärnu Sadam	65–59	62–94	86–93	101–55		69–81	68–81	73–49	82–79
Pärnu Sadam	64–49	71–74	74–90			87–72	62–67	75–84	76–67
Rakvere Tarvas/Palmse Metall	61–81	77–107	85–86	83–65	75–86		77–105	70–80	82–80
Rakvere Tarvas/Palmse Metall	61–91	77–103	76–97		70–93		67–91	69–88	65–83
Tartu Ülikool	96–66	77–76	85–69	88–57	88–69	110–64		86–65	94–72
Tartu Ülikool		69–71							
TLÜ/Kalev	74–98	64–74	76–88	94–67	80–88	61–65	63–110		67–68
TLÜ/Kalev	76–72	64–88	59–84		69–75	86–87	67–97		85–92
TTÜ KK	100–82	84–89	98–87	83–75	89–71	94–72	64–75	62–82	
TTÜ KK	85–78	80–108	102–77		71–85	92–86	54–85	73–80	

Source: Korvpalli Meistriliiga
Legend: Blue = home team win; Yellow = draw; Red = away team win.

== Playoffs ==
The playoffs began on 10 April and ended on 22 May. The tournament concluded with BC Kalev/Cramo defeating AVIS UTILITAS Rapla 4 games to 0 in the finals.

=== Bracket ===
Quarterfinals
1	BC Kalev/Cramo	3
8	Rakvere Tarvas/Palmse Metall	0
4	Pärnu Sadam	3
5	TTÜ KK	0
2	Tartu Ülikool	3
7	TLÜ/Kalev	0
3	AVIS UTILITAS Rapla	3
6	BC Valga-Valka/Maks & Moorits	0

Semifinals
1	BC Kalev/Cramo	3
4	Pärnu Sadam	0
2	Tartu Ülikool	1
3	AVIS UTILITAS Rapla	3

Finals
1	BC Kalev/Cramo	4
3	AVIS UTILITAS Rapla	0
Third place
2	Tartu Ülikool	3
4	Pärnu Sadam	0

== Individual statistics ==
Players qualify to this category by having at least 50% games played.

=== Points ===
Rank	Name	Team	Games	Points	PPG
1	(Serbia) Đorđe Dželetović	TLÜ/Kalev	16	293	18.31
2	(Estonia) Joonas Järveläinen	TTÜ KK	28	478	17.07
3	(Croatia) Domagoj Bubalo	Pärnu Sadam	25	412	16.48
4	(Estonia) Sten Olmre	TTÜ KK	28	439	15.68
5	(Netherlands) Thomas van der Mars	AVIS UTILITAS Rapla	38	587	15.45

=== Rebounds ===
Rank	Name	Team	Games	Rebounds	RPG
1	(Netherlands) Thomas van der Mars	AVIS UTILITAS Rapla	38	468	12.32
2	(Croatia) Domagoj Bubalo	Pärnu Sadam	25	201	8.04
3	(Estonia) Joonas Järveläinen	TTÜ KK	28	219	7.82
4	(Estonia) Madis Soodla	G4S Noorteliiga	13	98	7.54
5	(Australia) Venky Jois	Tartu Ülikool	31	228	7.35

=== Assists ===
Rank	Name	Team	Games	Assists	APG
1	(Estonia) Tanel Sokk	Tartu Ülikool	31	165	5.32
2	(Estonia) Sten Sokk	BC Kalev/Cramo	25	108	4.32
3	(Estonia) Norman Käbin	Pärnu Sadam	20	82	4.10
4	(Estonia) Sten Olmre	TTÜ KK	28	113	4.04
5	(Estonia) Mario Paiste	Rakvere Tarvas/Palmse Metall	24	88	3.67

== All-Star Game ==
The 2017 All-Star Game was played on 16 February 2017 in Tallinn at the Saku Suurhall. Team Blue won the game 159–152 (139–136). The MVP of the game was Rain Veideman, who scored 37 points.

Team White
Pos	Player	Team
Starters
G	(United States) Demonte Harper	BC Kalev/Cramo
G	(Estonia) Martin Paasoja	AVIS UTILITAS Rapla
F	(Estonia) Janari Jõesaar	Tartu Ülikool
F	(Estonia) Karl Johan Lips	Rakvere Tarvas/Palmse Metall
C	(Netherlands) Thomas van der Mars	AVIS UTILITAS Rapla
Reserves
G	(Estonia) Carlos Jürgens	G4S Noorteliiga
G	(Estonia) Kristo Saage	TLÜ/Kalev
G	(United States) Mandell Thomas	Tartu Ülikool
F	(Estonia) Erik Keedus	BC Kalev/Cramo
F	(United States) Mark Tollefsen	BC Kalev/Cramo
F	(Estonia) Kristjan Voolaid	AVIS UTILITAS Rapla
C	(Croatia) Domagoj Bubalo	Pärnu Sadam
Head coach: (Estonia) Aivar Kuusmaa (AVIS UTILITAS Rapla)

Team Blue
Pos	Player	Team
Starters
G	(Slovenia) Domen Bratož	AVIS UTILITAS Rapla
G	(Estonia) Rain Veideman	BC Kalev/Cramo
F	(Estonia) Indrek Kajupank	AVIS UTILITAS Rapla
F	(Estonia) Janar Talts	Tartu Ülikool
C	(United States) Mickell Gladness	BC Kalev/Cramo
Reserves
G	(Estonia) Sten Olmre	TTÜ KK
G	(Estonia) Sten Sokk	BC Kalev/Cramo
G	(Puerto Rico) Rasham Suárez	AVIS UTILITAS Rapla
F	(Estonia) Taavi Jurkatamm	G4S Noorteliiga
F	(Estonia) Saimon Sutt	Pärnu Sadam
F	(Latvia) Ivars Žvīgurs	BC Valga-Valka/Maks & Moorits
C	(Estonia) Reinar Hallik	Pärnu Sadam
Head coach: (Estonia) Gert Kullamäe (Tartu Ülikool)

16 February 2017	Team White	152–159	Team Blue	Tallinn
18:30	Scoring by quarter: 34–32, 34–32, 34–43, 50–52
	Pts: Jõesaar 22; Rebs: Paasoja 9 Asts: Saage 8 PIR: van der Mars 28	Boxscore	Pts: Veideman 37; Rebs: Gladness 11; Asts: five players 5 PIR: Veideman 41	Arena: Saku Suurhall; Attendance: 4,400; Referees: Rain Peerandi, Madis Allik, Ivo Kitsing

== Awards ==
=== Most Valuable Player ===
- (Netherlands) Thomas van der Mars (AVIS UTILITAS Rapla)

=== Finals Most Valuable Player ===
- (Bulgaria) Branko Mirković (BC Kalev/Cramo)

=== Best Defender ===
- (Estonia) Mihkel Kirves (Pärnu Sadam)

=== Best Young Player ===
- (Estonia) Siim-Markus Post (Rakvere Tarvas/Palmse Metall)

=== Coach of the Year ===
- (Estonia) Aivar Kuusmaa (AVIS UTILITAS Rapla)

=== All-KML Team ===
Pos	Player	Team
PG	(Bulgaria) Branko Mirković	BC Kalev/Cramo
SG	(Estonia) Martin Paasoja	AVIS UTILITAS Rapla
SF	(Estonia) Janari Jõesaar	Tartu Ülikool
PF	(Estonia) Indrek Kajupank	AVIS UTILITAS Rapla
C	(Netherlands) Thomas van der Mars	AVIS UTILITAS Rapla

=== Player of the Month ===
Month	Player	Team
October	(Estonia) Sten Olmre	TTÜ KK
November	(Netherlands) Thomas van der Mars	AVIS UTILITAS Rapla
December	(Estonia) Reinar Hallik	Pärnu Sadam
January	(Serbia) Đorđe Dželetović	TLÜ/Kalev
February	(Croatia) Domagoj Bubalo	AVIS UTILITAS Rapla
March	(Estonia) Janari Jõesaar	Tartu Ülikool

== See also ==
- 2016–17 Basketball Champions League
- 2016–17 FIBA Europe Cup
- 2016–17 VTB United League
- 2016–17 Baltic Basketball League
- 2016–17 Latvian Basketball League
