= Tiit Sokk =

Estonian basketball player and coach

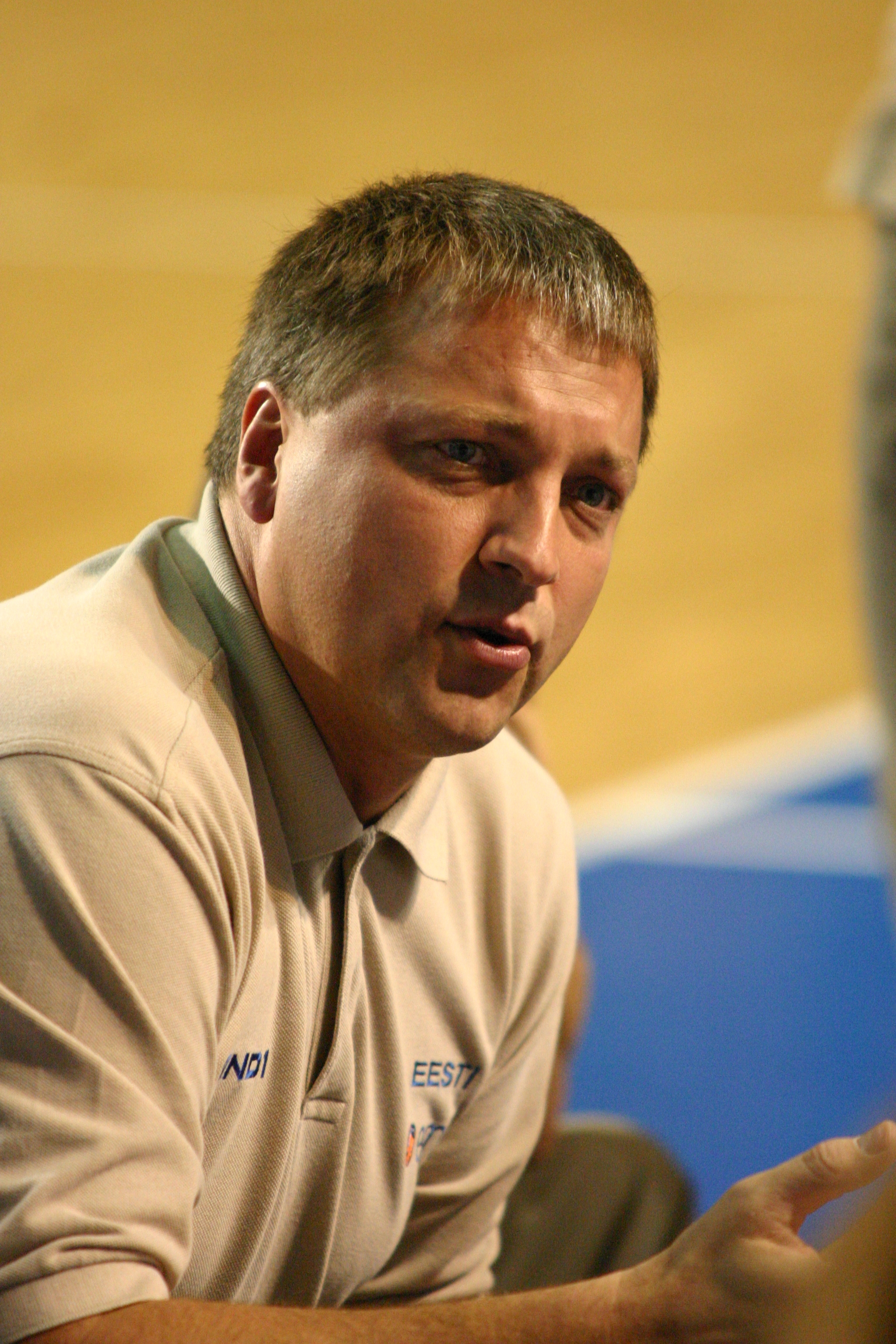
- Sokk coaching Estonia in 2006

Personal information
- Born: 15 November 1964 (age 61) Tartu, then part of Estonian SSR, Soviet Union
- Listed height: 6 ft 3 in (1.91 m)
- Listed weight: 218 lb (99 kg)

Career information
- Playing career: 1979–1998
- Position: Point guard
- Coaching career: 1998–present

Career history

Playing
- 1979–1984: Kalev
- 1984–1986: Dynamo Moscow
- 1986–1992: Kalev
- 1992–1996: Panathinaikos
- 1996–1997: Kalev
- 1997–1998: Aris

Coaching
- 1998–2008: Triobet/Dalkia
- 2006–2010: Audentes/Noortekoondis
- 2010: BC Kalev (assistant)
- 2010–2014: TTÜ
- 2014–present: Betoonimeister/Tskk/Nord

Career highlights
- As player: Estonian Basketball Hall Of Fame (2010); Estonian Sportsman of the Year (1991); USSR League champion (1991); 2× Estonian SSR champion (1984, 1985); Estonian League champion (1992); 3× Estonian SSR Cup winner (1983, 1984, 1986); 2× Greek Cup winner (1993, 1996); As coach: 2× I Liiga (2007, 2017); International Student Basketball League (2013)
Medals
Men's basketball
Representing Soviet Union
Summer Olympics
Gold medal – first place	1988 Seoul
FIBA World Cup
Silver medal – second place	1986 Spain
Silver medal – second place	1990 Argentina
EuroBasket
Bronze medal – third place	1989 Yugoslavia

Tiit Sokk (born 15 November 1964) is an Estonian former professional basketball player and current coach. Often cited as one of the very best European point guards of his generation, he is widely recognized as the greatest Estonian basketball player in history. Elected to the Hall of fame of Estonian basketball in 2010.

== Professional career ==
Sokk was awarded the Estonian best male athlete award in 1988. He won the Soviet Union League title in 1991 with Kalev Tallinn, and ended his career as a player in 1997, after playing a season with Aris in Greece.

== National team career ==
Sokk's most notable achievement was winning the Olympic gold medal as a member of the Soviet Union national team at the 1988 Summer Olympics. He also won two FIBA World Cup silver medals in 1986 and 1990, as well as the bronze medal at EuroBasket 1989.

== Coaching career ==
After his playing career, Sokk founded a basketball school in Estonia (Tiit Soku Korvpallikool), and coached in the Estonian Basketball League. He also was head coach of the Estonia national team during two different stints from 2004–2007 and 2009–2019.

== Personal life ==
Sokk has two sons, Tanel and Sten, who are also professional basketball players.

== Achievements ==
Kalev Tallinn

- 2× Soviet Estonian champion: 1984, 1985
- Soviet Union League champion: 1991
- Estonian League champion: 1992
- Estonian Basketball Hall of Fame: 2010

Panathinaikos

- 3× Greek League runner-up: 1993, 1995, 1996
- 2× Greek Cup winner: 1993, 1996

Awards
Preceded by Jüri Jaanson	Estonian Sportsman of the Year; 1991	Succeeded by Kaido Kaaberma
