= BC Tarvas =

Estonian basketball club

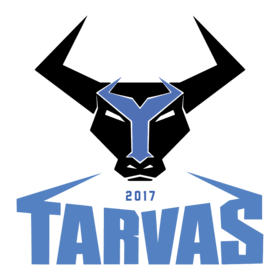
- Leagues: Korvpalli Meistriliiga; Estonian-Latvian Basketball League
- Founded: Rakvere Tarvas (2006–2017); BC Tarvas (2017–present)
- Arena: Rakvere Sports Hall
- Capacity: 2,747
- Location: Rakvere, Estonia
- Team colors: White, Blue, Black
- Head coach: Vaido Rego
- Championships: 1 Estonian Cup
Home	Away

BC Tarvas are a professional basketball club based in Rakvere, Estonia. The club competes in the Estonian-Latvian Basketball League. Their home arena is the Rakvere Sports Hall.

== History ==
=== 2006–2017 ===
Rakvere Tarvas was founded in 2006 by Andres Sõber and joined the top-tier Korvpalli Meistriliiga (KML) for the 2006–07 season, replacing another Rakvere based team, the financially troubled Rakvere Palliklubi. The team name Tarvas, meaning Aurochs in Estonian, is the symbol of Rakvere and is derived from the historic name of Rakvere, Tarvanpea (Aurochs' head). Rakvere Tarvas finished the 2006–07 regular season in 6th place, reaching the playoffs, where the team was eliminated in the quarterfinals.

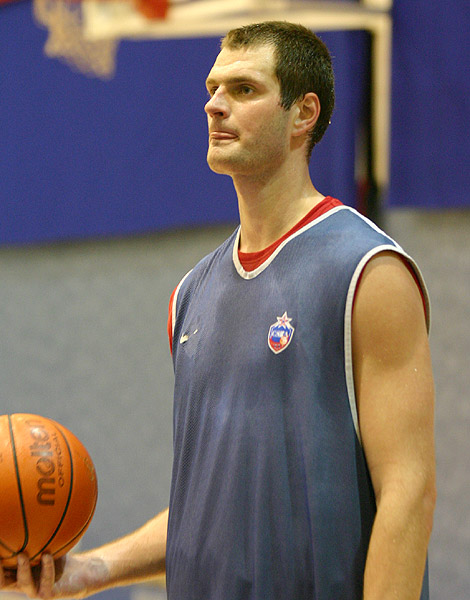
Martin Müürsepp played for Tarvas in the 2009–10 season and coached the team in the 2021–2022 season.

Sõber strengthened the team significantly during the 2009 off-season by signing point guard Valmo Kriisa, young shooting guard Rain Veideman and centers Richard Anderson and Reinar Hallik. In February 2010, they were joined by forward Martin Müürsepp. Rakvere Tarvas finished the 2009–10 regular season in second place and reached the finals in the playoffs. In the finals, Rakvere Tarvas faced the top-seeded TÜ/Rock and lost the series 2 games to 4, despite winning the first 2 games. Kriisa and Veideman were named to the All-KML Team, while Sõber won the Coach of the Year award. After the season, Rakvere Tarvas lost several star players, including Kriisa, Müürsepp and Veideman, and failed to repeat their success in the 2010–11 season, finishing in fourth place. Rakvere Tarvas also joined the Baltic Basketball League for the 2010–11 season, but failed to advance past the group stage of the Challenge Cup competition.

Rakvere Tarvas' logo

Rakvere Tarvas spent the 2011 off-season rebuilding. The team re-acquired Valmo Kriisa and signed Latvian players Kaspars Cipruss, Rinalds Sirsniņš and Juris Umbraško. In response, some Rakvere Tarvas fans started showing their support by attending games wearing Latvian national team uniforms. Rakvere Tarvas finished the 2011–12 regular season in third place and reached the semifinals in the playoffs, where the team was defeated by BC Kalev/Cramo. The team placed third in the final standings, after defeating Rapla 2 games to 0 in the third place games.

On 22 December 2012, Rakvere Tarvas won their first Estonian Cup, beating Rapla in the final 81–64. The team came third in the 2012–13 season, once again defeating Rapla in the third place games. Reimo Tamm was the KML top scorer with 16.36 points per game, while Brandis Raley-Ross and Juris Umbraško were named to the All-KML Team. Rakvere Tarvas competed in the 2013–14 EuroChallenge but failed to advance past the group stage with a 1–5 record. The team finished the 2013–14 season in third place, losing the semifinals against BC Kalev/Cramo 0 games to 3 and defeating Tallinna Kalev in the third place games 2 games to 1. Rakvere Tarvas folded after the 2016–17 season.

=== 2017–present ===
For the 2017–18 season, a new Rakvere club, RSK Tarvas, was created. In 2019, they won the second tier I liiga and were promoted to the Estonian-Latvian Basketball League.

== Home arena ==
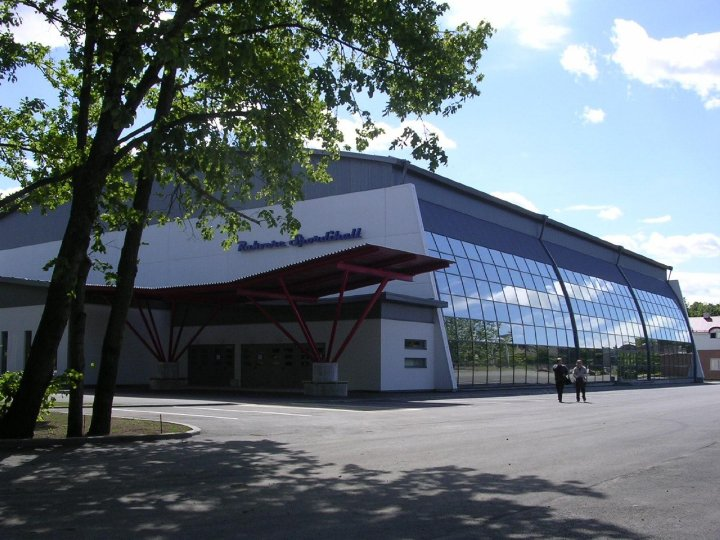
Rakvere Sports Hall is the home arena of BC Tarvas

- Rakvere Sports Hall

== Coaches ==
- Andres Sõber 2006–2017
- Madis Putko 2017–2018
- Juris Umbraško 2018–2021
- Martin Müürsepp 2021–2022
- Vaido Rego 2022–present

== Season by season ==
Season	Tier	Division	Pos.	Estonian Cup	Regional competitions		European competitions	
2006–07	1	Korvpalli Meistriliiga	6th	Quarterfinalist				
2007–08	1	Korvpalli Meistriliiga	9th	Quarterfinalist				
2008–09	1	Korvpalli Meistriliiga	6th	Quarterfinalist				
2009–10	1	Korvpalli Meistriliiga	2nd	Quarterfinalist				
2010–11	1	Korvpalli Meistriliiga	4th	Runner-up	BBL Challenge Cup	RS		
2011–12	1	Korvpalli Meistriliiga	3rd	Third place	BBL Challenge Cup	RU		
2012–13	1	Korvpalli Meistriliiga	3rd	Champion	Baltic Basketball League	QF	3 EuroChallenge	QR
2013–14	1	Korvpalli Meistriliiga	3rd	Third place	Baltic Basketball League	T16	3 EuroChallenge	RS
2014–15	1	Korvpalli Meistriliiga	4th	Runner-up	Baltic Basketball League	T16		
2015–16	1	Korvpalli Meistriliiga	5th	Quarterfinalist	Baltic Basketball League	T16		
2016–17	1	Korvpalli Meistriliiga	8th	Quarterfinalist	Baltic Basketball League	RS		
2017–18	3	II liiga	1st					
2018–19	2	I liiga	1st					
2019–20	1	Korvpalli Meistriliiga	5th (Note: The season was cancelled due to the COVID-19 pandemic.)		Estonian-Latvian Basketball League	–		
2020–21	1	Korvpalli Meistriliiga	4th	Runner-up	Estonian-Latvian Basketball League	RS		
2021–22	1	Korvpalli Meistriliiga	8th	Quarterfinalist	Estonian-Latvian Basketball League	13th		
2022–23	1	Korvpalli Meistriliiga	9th	Quarterfinalist	Estonian-Latvian Basketball League	16th		

== Trophies and awards ==
=== Trophies ===
Estonian League

- Runners-up (1): 2009–10

Estonian Cup

- Winners (1): 2012
- Runners-up (3): 2010, 2014, 2020

=== Individual awards ===
KML Best Young Player

- Rain Veideman – 2010
- Sander Saare – 2014
- Siim-Markus Post – 2017

KML Coach of the Year

- Andres Sõber – 2010

KML All-Star Five

- Brandis Raley-Ross – 2013, 2015
- Valmo Kriisa – 2010
- Rain Veideman – 2010
- Kaspars Cipruss – 2012
- Juris Umbraško – 2013
