= Märt Kermon =

Estonian basketball player and coach

Märt Kermon (born 17 May 1940) is an Estonian basketballer and basketball coach.

He was born in Tallinn. In 1965 he graduated from Tallinn Pedagogical Institute's Faculty of Physical Education.

He started his basketball exercising under the guidance of Märt Sepik. He was a member of basketball club Tallinna Kalev which won championships in 1967, 1968 and 1971.

In 1963 he started his training career. 1983–1985 he was the head coach of Estonia men's basketball team. 1997–2001 he was secretary-general of Estonian Basketball Association.

Awards:

- 1989 Merited Coach of Estonian SSR
- 2013 (Estonian: Eesti Kultuurkapitali kehakultuuri ja spordi sihtkapitali elutööpreemia)
