= James Williams (basketball) =

American basketball player

- Born: Bronx, New York, U.S.
- Occupation: American streetball basketball

James "Speedy" Williams is an American streetball basketball player from New York City. He attended Morris High School in The Bronx. He played at Medgar Evers College where he averaged 26 points per game, later going on to play with the Harlem Globetrotters and the Continental Basketball Association. He played 10 seasons with the United States Basketball League and the Harlem Wizards. He was named in ESPN's "Elite 24: Rucker Park legends".

He served as an advisor and played a role in the film Above The Rim. It was alleged that he along with Kerry Thompson made a big living playing in drug money sponsored basketball games.

== Notable wins ==
Williams was the winner in the March to the Garden Tournament and the 1 on 1 tournament winner at Madison Square Garden.
