= TalTech Basketball =

Estonian basketball club

TalTech/ALEXELA
- Leagues: Korvpalli Meistriliiga; Latvian–Estonian Basketball League; European North Basketball League
- Founded: 1951; 75 years ago
- History: List: TPI (1951–1989); TTÜ (1989–2018); TalTech (2018–present)
- Arena: TalTech Sports Hall
- Capacity: 1,000
- Location: Tallinn, Estonia
- Team colors: Navy blue, White, Magenta
- Main sponsor: Alexela
- Head coach: Alar Varrak
- Team captain: Oliver Metsalu
- Championships: 8 Estonian Championships; 8 Estonian Cups
- Website: taltech.ee/spordiklubi/korvpall
| Home | Away |

TalTech Basketball, also known as TalTech/ALEXELA for sponsorship reasons, is a professional basketball team based in Tallinn, Estonia. They are a part of the Tallinn University of Technology Sports Club. The team plays in the Estonian-Latvian Basketball League and the Korvpalli Meistriliiga (KML). Their home arena is the TalTech Sports Hall.

Tallinn University of Technology teams have won eight Estonian League championships and eight Estonian Cup titles.

== History ==
Basketball was first played at Tallinn Tehnikum, the predecessor of the Tallinn University of Technology, on 4 February 1928, when the Tallinn Tehnikum team defeated the visiting University of Tartu 21–19. TPI Spordiklubi (Tallinn Polytechnic Institute Sports Club) was formed in 1948. TPI made their debut in the Estonian Championship in 1951 under coach Jaroslav Dudkin, who would stay with the team for the next 32 seasons. They established themselves as a major force in Estonian basketball in the 1960s, when Tõnno Lepmets and Priit Tomson led the team to six consecutive league titles from 1961 to 1966. August Sokk took over as head coach in 1982 and guided the team, led by his son Tiit Sokk and Margus Metstak, to two more championships in 1984 and 1985. In 1989, TPI changed its name back to TTÜ. The team began to struggle in the early 1990s as more professional basketball clubs joined the top division, and after the 1993–94 season, they withdrew from the league.

In 1999, TTÜ became affiliated with Tallinna Ülikoolid-A. Le Coq (formerly BC Tallinn). In 2001, the team moved to the newly renovated TTÜ Sports Hall and changed their name to TTÜ-A. Le Coq. After the 2001–02 season concluded, TTÜ and A. Le Coq shifted their sponsorship to BC Hotronic, who changed their name to TTÜ/A. Le Coq. Coached by Heino Enden and led by veterans Aivar Kuusmaa and Rauno Pehka, the team won the Estonian Cup in 2003.

On 6 September 2005, TTÜ announced that they will withdraw from the forthcoming KML season. They returned to the league for the 2006–07 season. In 2010, TTÜ Korvpalliklubi merged operations with Tallinna Kalev and became TTÜ/Kalev. However, the partnership ended after just one season, and TTÜ Korvpalliklubi continued independently. They have won the International Students Basketball League (ISBL) three times, in 2013, 2016 and 2017. In 2018, the university adopted TalTech as its official abbreviation.

== Rivalries ==
=== Tartu Ülikool ===
The rivalry between TalTech and Tartu Ülikool is one of the prestigious matchups in Estonian basketball, also referred as the "universities derby". Both teams want to prove their strength and fight for victory, making every game between them competitive and intense. Since both of these clubs are university teams, they especially attract thousands of college students as fans from both universities. In every game both universities are represented with both fan clubs which mostly consists of college students. In 2024, a challenge trophy called August Soku Trophy was introduced. Everytime these two teams meet, the game winner takes trophy with them. The trophy is named after a legendary Estonian basketball player and coach August Sokk who won Estonian championships playing for Tartu and as a head coach with TPI (Tallinn Polytechnic Institute).

== Sponsorship naming ==
- TTÜ/A. Le Coq: 2001–2005
- TalTech/OPTIBET: 2021–2024
- TalTech/ALEXELA: 2024–present

== Home arenas ==
- TalTech Sports Hall (1975–present)

== Players ==
=== Current roster ===
Note: Flags indicate national team eligibility at FIBA-sanctioned events. Players may hold other non-FIBA nationalities not displayed.

TalTech/ALEXELA roster
Players
Coaches

| Pos. | No. | Nat. | Name | Ht. | Wt. | Age |
|---|---|---|---|---|---|---|
| PG | 1 | (Estonia) | Post, Siim-Markus | 1.84 m (6 ft 0 in) | 85 kg (187 lb) | 29 – 13 February 1997 |
| PF | 2 | (Estonia) | Jurkatamm, Taavi | 2.04 m (6 ft 8 in) | 90 kg (198 lb) | 29 – 10 October 1997 |
| SF | 5 | (Estonia) | Metsla, Tormi Joonatan | 1.98 m (6 ft 6 in) | 87 kg (192 lb) | 21 – 5 January 2005 |
| PF | 6 | (Estonia) | Metsalu, Oliver (C) | 1.96 m (6 ft 5 in) | 90 kg (198 lb) | 32 – 4 December 1993 |
| PF | 7 | (Estonia) | Poljakov, Mark | 2.01 m (6 ft 7 in) | 102 kg (225 lb) | 17 – 7 March 2009 |
| PG | 8 | (Estonia) | Kaljula, Daniel | 1.86 m (6 ft 1 in) | 70 kg (154 lb) | 17 – 27 March 2009 |
| SG | 9 | (Estonia) | Puidet, Jaan | 1.94 m (6 ft 4 in) | 90 kg (198 lb) | 34 – 4 January 1992 |
| SG | 10 | (Estonia) | Sutt, Saimon | 2.00 m (6 ft 7 in) | 89 kg (196 lb) | 31 – 12 April 1995 |
| PG | 11 | (Estonia) | Suurorg, Holger | 1.91 m (6 ft 3 in) | 82 kg (181 lb) | 19 – 7 September 2007 |
| PG | 14 | (Estonia) | Ilves, Gregor | 1.90 m (6 ft 3 in) | 78 kg (172 lb) | 27 – 13 January 1999 |
| PF | 19 | (Estonia) | Niits, Tormi | 1.98 m (6 ft 6 in) | 96 kg (212 lb) | 28 – 19 May 1998 |
| PG | 22 | (Estonia) | Suurorg, Oliver | 1.95 m (6 ft 5 in) | 82 kg (181 lb) | 26 – 8 January 2000 |
| PF | 24 | (Estonia) | Sonntak, Karl Mattias | 2.03 m (6 ft 8 in) | 98 kg (216 lb) | 19 – 19 March 2007 |
| SG | 31 | (Estonia) | Rikberg, Jorgen | 1.91 m (6 ft 3 in) | 89 kg (196 lb) | 24 – 9 March 2002 |

Head coach

- (Estonia) Alar Varrak

Assistant coach(es)

- (Estonia) Tanel Sokk

Legend

- (C) Team captain
- Injured

- Roster
Updated: 9 October 2026

=== Depth chart ===
| Pos. | Starting 5 | Bench 1 | Bench 2 |
|---|---|---|---|
| C | Taavi Jurkatamm | Karl Mattias Sonntak |
| PF | Oliver Metsalu | Tormi Metsla | Mark Poljakov |
| SF | Tormi Niits | Jorgen Rikberg | Saimon Sutt |
| SG | Jaan Puidet | Gregor Ilves | Holger Suurorg |
| PG | Siim-Markus Post | Oliver Suurorg | Daniel Kaljula |

=== Squad changes for/during the 2026–27 season ===
==== In ====
| No. | Pos. | Nat. | Name | Moving from | |
|---|---|---|---|---|---|
| 31 | SG | (Estonia) | Jorgen Rikberg | Viimsi | (Estonia) |
| 5 | SF | (Estonia) | Tormi Metsla | Virtus Imola | (Italy) |
| 24 | F | (Estonia) | Karl Mattias Sonntak | BC Pärnu | (Estonia) |
| 11 | PG | (Estonia) | Holger Suurorg | Audentese Spordigümnaasium | (Estonia) |
| 9 | SG | (Estonia) | Jaan Puidet | Real Valladolid | (Spain) |
| 14 | PG | (Estonia) | Gregor Ilves | BC Pärnu | (Estonia) |
| 4 | F | (Estonia) | Mark Poljakov | TalTech BS/Scanweld | (Estonia) |

==== Out ====
| No. | Pos. | Nat. | Name | Moving to | |
|---|---|---|---|---|---|
| 3 | PG | (Estonia) | Meiko Lindeberg | Keila Basket | (Estonia) |
| 5 | PG | (Estonia) | Kaarel Välb | Viimsi | (Estonia) |
| 11 | PF | (Estonia) | Kristjan Kitsing | To career end | |
| 15 | PG | (Estonia) | Ran Andre Pehka | To career end | |
| 23 | PF | (Estonia) | Ivo Van Tamm | BK Liepāja | (Latvia) |

== Coaches ==
- Jaroslav Dudkin 1950–1982
- August Sokk 1982–1986
- Andres Liinat 1987
- Märt Kermon 1987–1989
- Alar Sõnajalg 1989–1992, 1993–1994
- Mihkel Reinsalu 1992–1993
- Heino Lill 2004–2005, 2011–2012, 2014–2015
- Priit Vene 2005–2007
- Aivar Kuusmaa 2007–2010
- Üllar Kerde 2010–2011
- Tiit Sokk 2012–2014
- Rait Käbin 2015–2019
- Gert Kullamäe 2019
- Kris Killing 2019–2021
- Alar Varrak 2021–present

== Season by season ==
| Season | Tier | Division | Pos. | Estonian Cup | Baltic competitions | | Regional competitions | |
|---|---|---|---|---|---|---|---|---|
| 2006–07 | 1 | KML | 9th | First round | | | | |
| 2007–08 | 1 | KML | 10th | First round | | | | |
| 2008–09 | 1 | KML | 3rd | Runner-up | BBL Challenge Cup | QF | | |
| 2009–10 | 1 | KML | 4th | Third place | BBL Challenge Cup | 4th | | |
| 2010–11 | 1 | KML | 3rd | Fourth place | Baltic Basketball League | 13th | | |
| 2011–12 | 1 | KML | 5th | Fourth place | BBL Challenge Cup | QF | | |
| 2012–13 | 1 | KML | 5th | Quarterfinalist | Baltic Basketball League | RS | | |
| 2013–14 | 1 | KML | 5th | Quarterfinalist | | | | |
| 2014–15 | 1 | KML | 7th | Fourth place | Baltic Basketball League | RS | | |
| 2015–16 | 1 | KML | 7th | Fourth place | Baltic Basketball League | RS | | |
| 2016–17 | 1 | KML | 5th | Quarterfinalist | Baltic Basketball League | EF | | |
| 2017–18 | 1 | KML | 7th | | Baltic Basketball League | RS | | |
| 2018–19 | 1 | KML | 4th | | Estonian-Latvian Basketball League | 5th | | |
| 2019–20 | 1 | KML | 7th (Note: The season was cancelled due to the COVID-19 pandemic.) | | Estonian-Latvian Basketball League | – | | |
| 2020–21 | 1 | KML | 5th | Quarterfinalist | Estonian-Latvian Basketball League | RS | | |
| 2021–22 | 1 | KML | 4th | Third place | Estonian-Latvian Basketball League | 7th | | |
| 2022–23 | 1 | KML | 6th | Fourth place | Estonian-Latvian Basketball League | 9th | European North Basketball League | RS |
| 2023–24 | 1 | KML | 5th | Quarterfinalist | Estonian-Latvian Basketball League | 9th | | |
| 2024–25 | 1 | KML | 4th | Third place | Estonian-Latvian Basketball League | 9th | | |
| 2025–26 | 1 | KML | 3rd | Third place | Estonian-Latvian Basketball League | 6th | European North Basketball League | R16 |
| 2026–27 | 1 | KML | TBD | TBD | Estonian-Latvian Basketball League | | European North Basketball League | RS |

== Trophies and awards ==
=== Trophies ===
- Estonian League

Winners (8): 1960–61, 1961–62, 1962–63, 1963–64, 1964–65, 1965–66, 1983–84, 1984–1985

- Estonian Cup

Winners (8): 1960, 1961, 1962, 1964, 1966, 1967, 1970, 2003

- International Students Basketball League

Winners (3): 2012–13, 2015–16, 2016–17

=== Individual awards ===
KML Best Young Player

- Matthias Tass – 2018
- Ralf Küttis – 2022

KML All-Star Five

- Bambale Osby – 2011
- Kristjan Kitsing – 2016
- Toomas Raadik – 2019
- Rasmus Andre – 2025
- Oliver Metsalu – 2026
