= Erki Kivinukk =

Estonian basketball player

Erki Kivinukk (born 6 February 1973) is an Estonian basketball player.

He was born in Tallinn. In 1991 he graduated from Estonian Sports Gymnasium, and 2001 Tallinn Pedagogical Institute's Faculty of Physical Education.

He began his basketball career in 1984, coached by Avo Mae. He has played in BC Asto, BC Kalev and BC Tallinn. 1993–2003 he was a member of Estonia men's national basketball team.
