= KK Kalev =

Estonian basketball team

- Nickname: Kalev
- Leagues: USSR Premier Basketball League; Korvpalli Meistriliiga
- Founded: 1920
- Dissolved: 2005
- History: Kalev (1920–1994); Kalev/Auma (1994-95); Kalev (1995–2005)
- Arena: Kalev Sports Hall
- Location: Tallinn, Estonia
- Team colors: Blue, White
- Championships: 1 Soviet Championship; 18 Estonian Championships; 9 Estonian Cups
| Home | Away |

Kalev (also known as Tallinn Kalev, Korvpalliklubi Kalev) was a professional basketball club from Tallinn, Estonia. The team played in the Estonian Basketball League and in the Soviet Union Basketball League. Their home arena was Kalev Sports Hall.

Kalev was a professional basketball team representing Estonia in Soviet Union Basketball League until 1992; thereafter Kalev was designed like a national team with the best 12 players from all over Estonia.

== History ==
Kalev was founded in 1920 with the eponymous sports Estonian society. Kalev became winner of the second to last championship of the USSR Premier Basketball League in 1991 and in 1991–92 season the team became runner-up of the open Commonwealth of Independent States league. After the collapse of the Soviet Union leading players left to play in European basketball clubs. In the season 1993–94 the club almost collapsed, and a year later, in season 1994–95, played in the Estonian Championship already under brand Kalev/Auma. In the 1995–96 season the team is regaining its former name in saw the return of Martin Müürsepp and Margus Metstak, and in the 1996–97 season Tiit Sokk returned from Panathinaikos. In the 1999–98 season for the club signed Rauno Pehka and Gert Kullamäe who returned to the team Sergei Babenko and American players. In the same season Tiit Sokk leaves from Tallinn to play in Greece. In the 1999–2000 season the club won the champion of Estonia. The season 2004–05 became runner-up of the Estonian Cup. The next season the historic Kalev merged into BC Kalev/Cramo.

Kalev is often confused with Estonian team Tallinna/Kalev TLÜ, which has no connections with KK Kalev.

== Honours & achievements ==
USSR League

- Winners (1): 1990–91
- Runners-up (1): 1991–92

USSR Cup

- Runners-up (1): 1977–78

Estonian League

- Winners (18): 1927, 1930, 1931, 1943, 1944 (winter), 1945, 1946, 1947, 1967, 1968, 1971, 1991–92, 1992–93, 1994–95, 1995–96, 1997–98, 2001–02, 2002–03,

Estonian Cup

- Winners (9): 1946, 1948, 1968, 1969, 1972, 1991–92, 1992–93, 1995–96, 2000-01

== Notable players ==
=== Players on the NBA draft ===
| Position | Player | Year | Round | Pick | Drafted by |
|---|---|---|---|---|---|
| PF/C | (Estonia) Martin Müürsepp | 1996 | 1st round | 25th | Utah Jazz, traded to Miami Heat |

Note: Flags indicate national team eligibility at FIBA-sanctioned events. Players may hold other non-FIBA nationalities not displayed.

Criteria

To appear in this section a player must have either:

- Set a club record or won an individual award while at the club
- Played at least one official international match for their national team at any time
- Played at least one official NBA match at any time.

- (Estonia) Jaak Salumets
- (Estonia) Heino Enden
- (Estonia) Jaak Lipso
- (Estonia) Tiit Sokk
- (Estonia) Aleksei Tammiste
- (Estonia) Joann Lõssov
- (Estonia) Martin Müürsepp
- (Estonia) Margus Metstak
- (Estonia) Gert Kullamäe
- (Estonia) Aivar Kuusmaa
- (Estonia) Valmo Kriisa
- (Estonia) Rauno Pehka
- (Estonia) Kristjan Kangur
