= 2007–08 KML season =

Estonian national championships in basketball

SEB Korvpalli Meistriliiga^{1}
- Season: 2007–08
- Duration: 3 October 2007 – 21 May 2008
- Teams: 10

Regular season
- Top seed: TÜ/Rock

Finals
- Champions: TÜ/Rock; 24th title
- Runners-up: Tallinna Kalev/Cramo
- Third place: Fausto
- Fourth place: Pirita
- Finals MVP: (United States) Brian Cusworth

Statistical leaders
Points	(Estonia) Veljo Vares	19.50
Rebounds	(United States) Greg McQuay	11.24
Assists	(Georgia (country)) Giorgi Tsintsadze	4.62
- ^{1} Sponsored league name, referring to SEB.

The 2007–08 SEB Korvpalli Meistriliiga is the 17th season of the Estonian basketball league and the fourth under the title sponsorship of SEB. Including the competition's previous incarnations, this is the 83rd season of the Estonian men's basketball league. TÜ/Rock came into the season as defending champions of the 2006–07 KML season.

The season started on 3 October 2007 and concluded on 21 May 2008 with TÜ/Rock defeating Tallinna Kalev/Cramo 4 games to 0 in the 2008 KML Finals to win their 24th Estonian League title.

== Regular season ==
=== League table ===
Pos	Team	Pld	W	L	Pts	PCT	Qualification
1	TÜ/Rock	36	33	3	69	.917	Qualification to Playoffs
2	Tallinna Kalev/Cramo	36	33	3	69	.917	Qualification to Playoffs
3	Pirita	36	23	13	59	.639	Qualification to Playoffs
4	Triobet/Dalkia	36	22	14	58	.611	Qualification to Playoffs
5	Fausto	36	20	16	56	.556	Qualification to Playoffs
6	Valga Welg	36	18	18	54	.500	Qualification to Playoffs
7	Pärnu/Catwees	36	10	26	46	.278	Qualification to Playoffs
8	Kraft Mööbel/Kohila	36	8	28	44	.222	Qualification to Playoffs
9	Rakvere Tarvas	36	7	29	43	.194	
10	TTÜ	36	6	30	42	.167	

Updated to match(es) played on 21 May 2008. Source: KML (2007/2008)

== Playoffs ==
The playoffs began on 18 April 2008 and ended on 21 May 2008. The tournament concluded with TÜ/Rock defeating Tallinna Kalev/Cramo 4 games to 0 in the 2008 KML Finals.

=== Bracket ===
Quarter-finals
1	TÜ/Rock	2
8	Kraft Mööbel/Kohila	0
4	Triobet/Dalkia	1
5	Fausto	2
2	Tallinna Kalev/Cramo	2
7	Pärnu/Catwees	0
3	Pirita	2
6	Valga Welg	0

Semi-finals
1	TÜ/Rock	3
5	Fausto	0
2	Tallinna Kalev/Cramo	3
3	Pirita	0

Finals
1	TÜ/Rock	4
2	Tallinna Kalev/Cramo	0
Third place
3	Pirita	0
5	Fausto	2
