= BC Tallinna Kalev =

Estonian basketball club

Tallinna Kalev
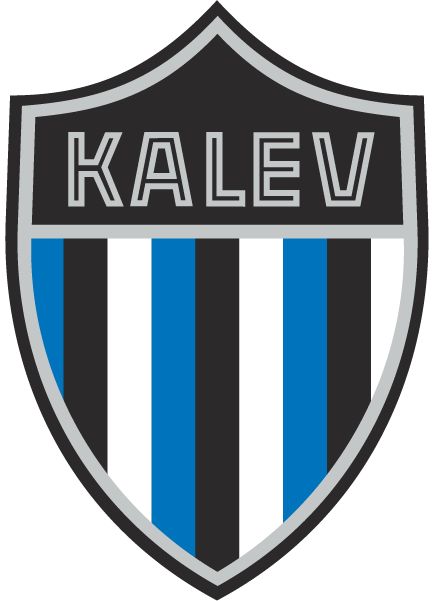
- Founded: 2002; 24 years ago
- History: Pirita Palliklubi (2002–2008); Tallinna Kalev (2008–2024)
- Arena: Nord Sports Hall
- Capacity: 980
- Location: Tallinn, Estonia
- Team colors: Blue, White
Home	Away

Tallinna Kalev are a basketball team based in Tallinn, Estonia. The team was founded in 2002 as Pirita Palliklubi and played in the Korvpalli Meistriliiga (KML) from 2002 to 2024.

== History ==
The team was founded in 2002 as Pirita Palliklubi (Pirita Ball Club), the same year they joined the Korvpalli Meistriliiga (KML), the top tier of Estonian basketball. In their first season, they reached the Estonian Cup final, but lost 76–92 to TÜ/Rock.

Prior to the 2008–09 season, BC Pirita joined the Tallinn Sports Association Kalev and changed their name to Tallinna Kalev. In July 2010, Tallinna Kalev merged operations with TTÜ Korvpalliklubi. They played as TTÜ/Kalev and TTÜ/Kalev II through the 2010–11 season. However, the partnership ended after just one season, and Tallinna Kalev continued independently.

In 2014, the team became affiliated with Tallinn University (TLÜ). They made their debut in a European competition by competing in the 2016–17 season of the FIBA Europe Cup, but failed to advance past the group stage. Coached by former NBA player Martin Müürsepp, Tallinna Kalev/TLÜ made the KML Finals for the first time in team history in 2019. However, they were swept in three games by defending champion BC Kalev/Cramo.

For the 2022–23 season, Tallinna Kalev merged operations with Audentes Sports Club. The team withdrew from the top-tier competitions following the 2023–24 season.

== Sponsorship naming ==
- Tallinn Kalev/SNABB: 2023–2024

== Home arenas ==
- Pirita TOP Sports Center (2002–2004)
- Pirita Business School Sports Hall (2004–2009)
- TTÜ Sports Hall (2010–2011)
- Kalev Sports Hall (2009–2010, 2011–2016, 2017–2018)
- Sõle Sports Center (2018–2022)
- Audentes Sports Center (2016–2017, 2022–2023)
- Nord Cramo Sports Hall (2021–2022, 2023–2024)

== Players ==
=== Current roster ===
Note: Flags indicate national team eligibility at FIBA-sanctioned events. Players may hold other non-FIBA nationalities not displayed.

Tallinna Kalev/SNABB roster
Players
Coaches

Pos.	No.	Nat.	Name	Ht.	Wt.	Age
SG	0	(Estonia)	Paiste, Mario	1.88 m (6 ft 2 in)	84 kg (185 lb)	37 – 3 September 1989
SG	1	(Estonia)	Metsaorg, Georg Oliver	1.91 m (6 ft 3 in)	75 kg (165 lb)	21 – 27 April 2005
PF	3	(Estonia)	Mäeorg, Daniil	2.02 m (6 ft 8 in)	86 kg (190 lb)	22 – 31 December 2003
PG	4	(United States)	Hardy, Bailey Joel	1.88 m (6 ft 2 in)	75 kg (165 lb)	26 – 6 July 2000
SG	5	(Estonia)	Evestus, Artur	1.92 m (6 ft 4 in)	74 kg (163 lb)	21 – 6 September 2005
PF	6	(Estonia)	Allemann, Georg	2.01 m (6 ft 7 in)	102 kg (225 lb)	25 – 11 March 2001
SF	9	(Estonia)	Keedus, Erik	1.99 m (6 ft 6 in)	95 kg (209 lb)	36 – 27 April 1990
PF	11	(United States)	Lilly, Daquan Romel	2.01 m (6 ft 7 in)	96 kg (212 lb)	29 – 9 August 1997
PF	14	(United States)	Moore, James	2.00 m (6 ft 7 in)	96 kg (212 lb)	28 – 6 October 1997
PF	15	(Estonia)	Raadik, Toomas	2.02 m (6 ft 8 in)	108 kg (238 lb)	36 – 15 August 1990
PG	20	(Estonia)	Loigu, Andre	1.84 m (6 ft 0 in)	86 kg (190 lb)	25 – 25 July 2001
SF	23	(Estonia)	Jaakson, Mark-Andreas	2.00 m (6 ft 7 in)	85 kg (187 lb)	26 – 15 February 2000
SG	24	(United States)	Raley-Ross, Brandis	1.88 m (6 ft 2 in)	91 kg (201 lb)	39 – 6 February 1987
PG	43	(Estonia)	Schmalz, Eric	1.88 m (6 ft 2 in)	86 kg (190 lb)	27 – 12 September 1999
C	51	(Ukraine)	Tykhonov, Dmytro	2.07 m (6 ft 9 in)	122 kg (269 lb)	34 – 19 January 1992

Head coach

- (Estonia) Kalle Klandorf

Assistant coach(es)

- (Estonia) Karl Reismann

Legend

- (C) Team captain
- Injured

- Roster
Updated: 26 January 2024

=== Depth chart ===
Pos.	Starting 5	Bench 1	Bench 2
C	Dmytro Tykhonov	James Moore
PF	Toomas Raadik	Mark-Andreas Jaakson	Georg Allemann
SF	Erik Keedus	Lorenzo Ferrell
SG	Mario Paiste	Brandis Raley-Ross
PG	Bailey Hardy	Eric Schmalz	Andre Loigu

== Coaches ==
- Kalle Klandorf 2002–2010, 2012–2017, 2017–2018, 2023–2024
- Üllar Kerde 2010–2011
- Indrek Reinbok 2011–2012
- Raido Roos 2017
- Gert Kullamäe 2018–2019
- Martin Müürsepp 2019–2021
- Valdo Lips 2021
- Brett Nõmm 2021–2022
- Rauno Pehka 2022–2023

== Season by season ==
Season	Tier	Division	Pos.	Estonian Cup	Baltic competitions		European competitions	
2002–03	1	KML	5th	Runner-up				
2003–04	1	KML	4th	Quarterfinalist				
2004–05	1	KML	4th	Semifinalist	BBL Division 2	RS		
2005–06	1	KML	4th	Third place	Baltic Basketball League	17th		
2006–07	1	KML	5th	Quarterfinalist				
2007–08	1	KML	4th	Third place				
2008–09	1	KML	5th	Third place	BBL Challenge Cup	12th		
2009–10	1	KML	6th	Quarterfinalist	BBL Challenge Cup	QF		
2010–11	1	KML	7th	Quarterfinalist				
2011–12	1	KML	6th	Quarterfinalist				
2012–13	1	KML	8th	Fourth place	Baltic Basketball League	RS		
2013–14	1	KML	4th	Quarterfinalist	Baltic Basketball League	RS		
2014–15	1	KML	8th	Quarterfinalist	Baltic Basketball League	RS		
2015–16	1	KML	4th	Third place	Baltic Basketball League	EF		
2016–17	1	KML	7th	First round	Baltic Basketball League	EF	4 FIBA Europe Cup	RS
2017–18	1	KML	6th		Baltic Basketball League	QF		
2018–19	1	KML	2nd		Estonian-Latvian Basketball League	10th		
2019–20	1	KML	6th (Note: The season was cancelled due to the COVID-19 pandemic.)		Estonian-Latvian Basketball League	–		
2020–21	1	KML	7th	Fourth place	Estonian-Latvian Basketball League	RS		
2021–22	1	KML	7th	Quarterfinalist	Estonian-Latvian Basketball League	14th		
2022–23	1	KML	8th	Quarterfinalist	Estonian-Latvian Basketball League	14th		
2023–24	1	KML	8th		Estonian-Latvian Basketball League	16th		

== Trophies and awards ==
=== Trophies ===
- Estonian League

Runners-up (1): 2018–19

- Estonian Cup

Runners-up (1): 2002

=== Individual awards ===
Newcomer of the Year

- Martin Müürsepp – 2019

KML All-Star Five

- Erki Kivinukk – 2004
- Damarcus Harrison – 2019
