= 2006–07 KML season =

Estonian national championships in basketball

SEB Korvpalli Meistriliiga^{1}
- Season: 2006–07
- Duration: 4 October 2006 – 29 May 2007
- Teams: 10

Regular season
- Top seed: TÜ/Rock

Finals
- Champions: TÜ/Rock; 23rd title
- Runners-up: Tallinna Kalev/Cramo
- Third place: Fausto
- Fourth place: Dalkia/Nybit
- Finals MVP: (Estonia) Tanel Tein

Statistical leaders
Points	(Estonia) Jesper Parve	21.00
Rebounds	(United States) Ivano Newbill	13.09
Assists	(Estonia) Rait Käbin	4.15
- ^{1} Sponsored league name, referring to SEB.

The 2006–07 SEB Korvpalli Meistriliiga was the 16th season of the Estonian basketball league and the third under the title sponsorship of SEB. Including the competition's previous incarnations, this was the 82nd season of the Estonian men's basketball league. Tallinna Kalev/Cramo came into the season as defending champions of the 2005–06 KML season.

The season started on 4 October 2006 and concluded on 29 May 2007 with TÜ/Rock defeating Tallinna Kalev/Cramo 4 games to 2 in the 2007 KML Finals to win their 23rd Estonian League title.

== Regular season ==
=== League table ===
Pos	Team	Pld	W	L	Pts	PCT	Qualification
1	TÜ/Rock	36	33	3	69	.917	Qualification to Playoffs
2	Tallinna Kalev/Cramo	36	31	5	67	.861	Qualification to Playoffs
3	Tartu Fausto	36	25	11	61	.694	Qualification to Playoffs
4	Dalkia/Nybit	36	20	16	56	.556	Qualification to Playoffs
5	TTP/Pirita	36	18	18	54	.500	Qualification to Playoffs
6	Rakvere Tarvas	36	17	19	53	.367	Qualification to Playoffs
7	Kalev/Rapla	36	15	21	51	.417	Qualification to Playoffs
8	Valga Welg	36	15	21	51	.417	Qualification to Playoffs
9	TTÜ	36	4	32	40	.111	
10	Pärnu	36	2	34	38	.056	

Updated to match(es) played on 29 May 2007. Source: KML (2006/2007)

== Playoffs ==
The playoffs began on 11 April 2007 and ended on 29 May 2007. The tournament concluded with TÜ/Rock defeating Tallinna Kalev/Cramo 4 games to 2 in the 2007 KML Finals.

=== Bracket ===
Quarter-finals
1	TÜ/Rock	2
8	Valga Welg	0
4	Dalkia/Nybit	2
5	TTP/Pirita	0
2	Tallinna Kalev/Cramo	2
7	Kalev/Rapla	0
3	Tartu Fausto	2
6	Rakvere Tarvas	0

Semi-finals
1	TÜ/Rock	3
4	Dalkia/Nybit	1
2	Tallinna Kalev/Cramo	3
3	Tartu Fausto	0

Finals
1	TÜ/Rock	4
2	Tallinna Kalev/Cramo	2
Third place
3	Tartu Fausto	2
4	Dalkia/Nybit	1
