= Triobet/Dalkia =

Estonian basketball club

- Founded: 1992; 33 years ago
- Dissolved: 2008
- History: Dublant (1992–1993); Nybit (1993–2007); Triobet/Dalkia (2007–2008)
- Arena: Audentes Sports Center
- Location: Tallinn

Triobet/Dalkia (also known as Nybit) was an Estonian professional basketball club founded in 1992 and dissolved in 2008. The club played in the Estonian Korvpalli Meistriliiga.

The team won 1 Estonian Cup.

The team played its home games at Audentes Sports Center.

== History ==
Founded in 1992 as Dublant, the team changed its name to Nybit in 1993. In 1998, the team won the Estonian Basketball Cup. Nybit reached the Korvpalli Meistriliiga finals in the 1998–99 KML season and the 2003–04 KML season but failed to win the title. In 2007, the team changed its name to Triobet/Dalkia. The team was dissolved in 2008.

== Honours ==
=== Cups ===
- Estonian Cup: 1

1998
