= University of Tartu basketball team past rosters =

Rosters of Estonian basketball club

The University of Tartu basketball team past rosters are for the rosters of the University of Tartu basketball team, a professional basketball team based in Tartu, Estonia.

Note: The following page shows rosters players who have reached the Final Four of an international cup or championship.

== 1948/49 ==
Titles

- Soviet Union Champion
- (Estonian Soviet Socialist Republic) Estonian SSR Champion

Roster

- (Soviet Union) / (Estonia) Ernst Ehaveer
- (Soviet Union) / (Estonia) Uno Kiivet
- (Soviet Union) / (Estonia) Heino Krevald
- (Soviet Union) / (Estonia) Heino Kruus
- (Soviet Union) / (Estonia) Viktor Laats
- (Soviet Union) / (Estonia) Georg Rekker
- (Soviet Union) / (Estonia) Harri Russak
- (Soviet Union) / (Estonia) Joosep Toim
- Head coach: Edgar Naarits

== 1949/50 ==
Titles

- (Estonian Soviet Socialist Republic) Estonian SSR Champion

Honors

- Soviet Union Championship Runner-up

Roster

- (Soviet Union) / (Estonia) Aavo Alla
- (Soviet Union) / (Estonia) Ernst Ehaveer
- (Soviet Union) / (Estonia) Heino Krevald
- (Soviet Union) / (Estonia) Erich Kübarsepp
- (Soviet Union) / (Estonia) Viktor Laats
- (Soviet Union) / (Estonia) Heino Raudsik
- (Soviet Union) / (Estonia) Arnold Sahva
- (Soviet Union) / (Estonia) Joosep Toim
- Head coach: Edgar Naarits

== 1950/51 ==
Titles

- (Estonian Soviet Socialist Republic) Estonian SSR Champion

Honors

- Soviet Union Championship Final Tournament (3rd place)

Roster

- (Soviet Union) / (Estonia) Heldur Aljaste
- (Soviet Union) / (Estonia) Ernst Ehaveer
- (Soviet Union) / (Estonia) Ervin Erik
- (Soviet Union) / (Estonia) Heldur Jaanson
- (Soviet Union) / (Estonia) Viktor Laats
- (Soviet Union) / (Estonia) Valter Lenk
- (Soviet Union) / (Estonia) Madis Norvik
- (Soviet Union) / (Estonia) Heino Raudsik
- (Soviet Union) / (Estonia) Georg Rekker
- (Soviet Union) / (Estonia) Harri Russak
- Head coach: Edgar Naarits

== 2007/08 ==
Titles

- (Estonia) Estonian League Champion

Honors

- (Europe) FIBA EuroCup Final Four (4th place)
- (Estonia) Estonian Basketball Cup Finalist

Roster

- #4 (Estonia) Kristo Aab
- #5 (Estonia) Silver Leppik
- #7 (Estonia) Tanel Tein
- #8 (Georgia (country)) Giorgi Tsintsadze
- #9 (United States) Brian Cusworth
- #10 (Estonia) Vallo Allingu
- #11 (Estonia) Marek Doronin
- #12 (Estonia) Asko Paade
- #13 (Lithuania) Kęstutis Šeštokas
- #14 (Estonia) Gert Kullamäe
- #15 (Estonia) Janar Talts
- Head coach: (Estonia) Üllar Kerde
- Assistant coach: (Estonia) Indrek Visnapuu
- Assistant coach: (Estonia) Paavo Russak

== 2008/09 ==
Honors

- Baltic Basketball League Final Four (3rd place)
- (Estonia) Estonian League Championship Runner-up

Roster

- #4 (Estonia) Kristo Aab
- #5 (Estonia) Sten-Timmu Sokk
- #6 (United States) Tanoka Beard
- #7 (Estonia) Tanel Tein
- #8 (Georgia (country)) Giorgi Tsintsadze
- #9 (Estonia) Timo Eichfuss
- #10 (Estonia) Vallo Allingu
- #11 (Estonia) Marek Doronin
- #12 (Estonia) Asko Paade
- #13 (Georgia (country)) Viktor Sanikidze
- #14 (Estonia) Gert Kullamäe
- #15 (Estonia) Janar Talts
- #31 (Estonia) Silver Leppik
- #33 (Estonia) Kristjan Kitsing
- Head coach: (Estonia) Indrek Visnapuu
- Assistant coach: (Estonia) Paavo Russak

== 2025/26 ==
Honors

- Latvian–Estonian Basketball League Runner–up
- (Estonia) Estonian League Champions
- (Estonia) Estonian Cup Winners

Roster

- #0 (United States) Bryce McBride
- #2 (Estonia) Robert Valge
- #3 (United States) Dylan Painter
- #4 (Estonia) Hannes Saar
- #5 (Estonia) Rait-Riivo Laane
- #8 (United States) Malcolm Bernard
- #9 (Estonia) Karl Johan Lips
- #16 (Estonia) Rasmus Andre
- #18 (Estonia) Rando Roos
- #20 (Estonia) Rauno Nurger
- #35 (Estonia) Markus Ilver
- #40 (Estonia) Martin Paasoja
- Head coach: (Estonia) Aivar Kuusmaa
- Assistant coach: (Estonia) Toomas Kandimaa
- Assistant coach: (Estonia) Olari Narits
