= Estonian Basketball Cup =

Estonian basketball competition

Estonian Cup
- Current season, competition or edition: 2025–26 Estonian Basketball Cup
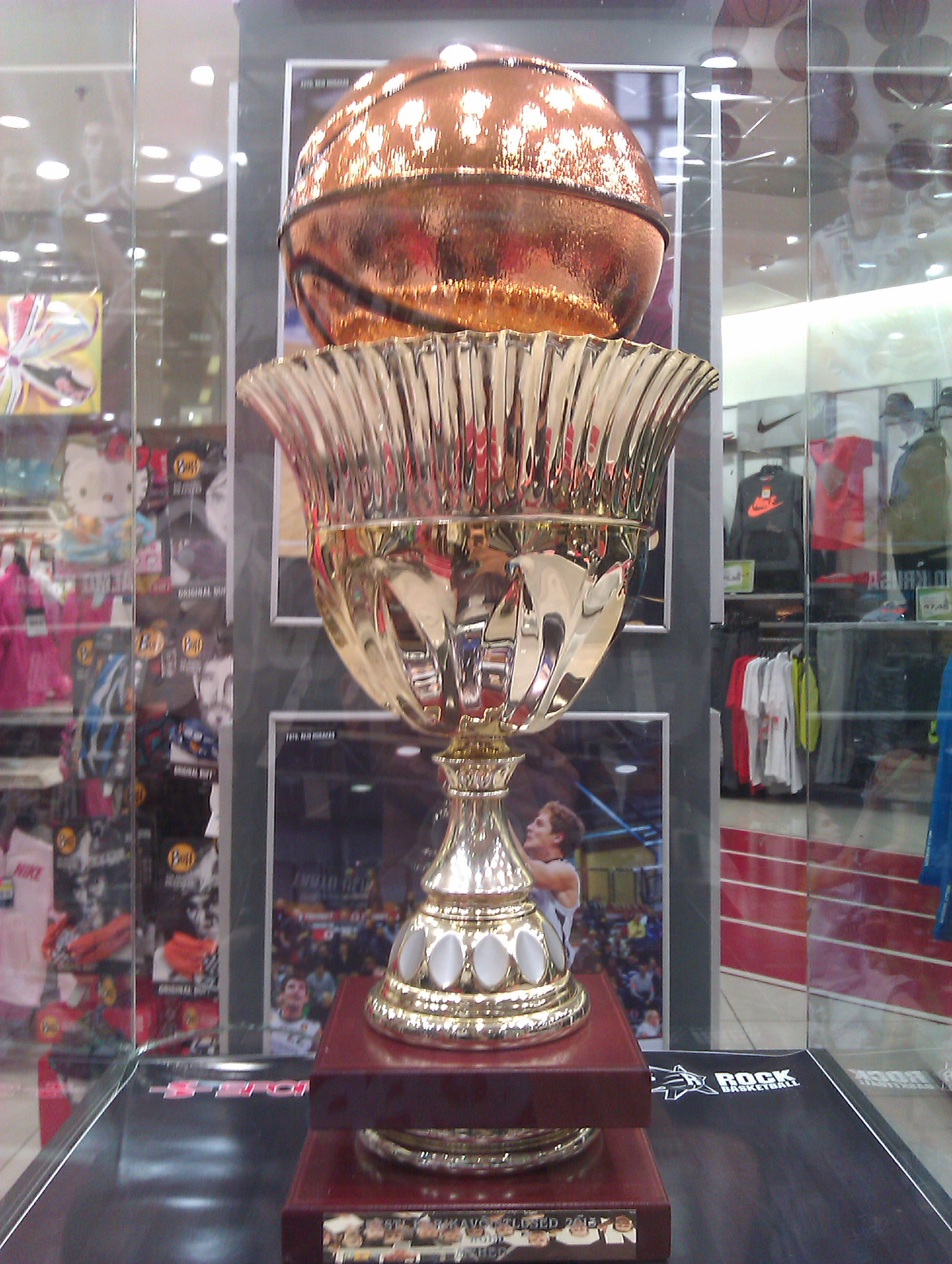
- Sport: Basketball
- Founded: 1946
- CEO: Priit Sarapuu
- Country: Estonia
- Continent: (European Union) Europe
- Most recent champions: Tartu Ülikool Maks & Moorits (18th title)
- Most titles: Tartu Ülikool (18 titles)
- Broadcaster: Delfi TV
- Related competitions: Estonian League
- Website: basket.ee

The Estonian Cup (Estonian: Eesti karikavõistlused), also known as the Utilitas Basketball Cup for sponsorship reasons, is an annual cup competition for Estonian basketball teams. It is organized by the Estonian Basketball Association.

Until the 2000–01 season, the cup tournament was held in the end of the season in spring. In 2001, the tournament was moved to the first half of the season, and two Estonian Basketball Cup tournaments were held within the same calendar year.

== Winners ==
- 1946: Kalev
- 1947: Not held
- 1948: Kalev
- 1949: Not held
- 1950: Tartu ÜSK
- 1951: Not held
- 1952: Tartu ÜSK
- 1953–1955: Not held
- 1956: TRÜ
- 1957: EPA
- 1958: TRÜ
- 1959: EPA
- 1960: TPI
- 1961: TPI
- 1962: TPI
- 1963: EPA
- 1964: TPI
- 1965: EPA
- 1966: TPI
- 1967: TPI
- 1968: Kalev
- 1969: Kalev
- 1970: TPI
- 1971: Keskrajoon
- 1972: Kalev
- 1973: EKE Projekt
- 1974: TRÜ
- 1975: Not held
- 1976: TRÜ
- 1977–1978: Not held
- 1979: TRÜ
- 1980: Standard
- 1981: Standard
- 1982: Metallist
- 1983–1987: Not held
- 1988: Harju KEK
- 1989: Harju KEK
- 1990–1991: Not held
- 1992: Kalev
- 1993: Kalev/Rafter
- 1994–1995: Not held
- 1996: Kalev
- 1997: Not held
- 1998: Nybit
- 1999: Tallinn
- 2000: Tartu Ülikool Delta
- 2001: Tartu Ülikool Delta
- 2001: Kalev
- 2002: Tartu Ülikool Rock
- 2003: TTÜ/A. Le Coq
- 2004: Tartu Ülikool Rock
- 2005: Kalev Cramo
- 2006: Kalev Cramo
- 2007: Kalev Cramo
- 2008: Kalev Cramo
- 2009: Tartu Ülikool Rock
- 2010: Tartu Ülikool Rock
- 2011: Tartu Ülikool Rock
- 2012: Rakvere Tarvas
- 2013: Tartu Ülikool Rock
- 2014: Tartu Ülikool Rock
- 2015: Kalev Cramo
- 2016: Kalev Cramo
- 2017–2019: Not held
- 2020: Kalev Cramo
- 2021: Tartu Ülikool
- 2022: Kalev Cramo
- 2024: Kalev Cramo
- 2025: Kalev Cramo
- 2026: Tartu Ülikool Maks & Moorits

== Finals ==
Year	Date	Winner	Score	Runners-up	Venue	Location	MVP	Ref.
2001	15 December 2001	Tallinna Kalev	94–78	Tartu Rock	Haapsalu Gymnasium	Haapsalu	Not awarded	
2002	21 December 2002	TÜ/Rock	92–76	Pirita	Keila Health Center	Keila	Not awarded	
2003	28 September 2003	TTÜ/A. Le Coq	88–68	Tallinna Kalev	Pärnu Rabahall	Pärnu	Not awarded	
2004	17 October 2004	TÜ/Rock	89–85	Tallinna Kalev	Viljandi Sports Hall	Viljandi	Not awarded	
2005	2 October 2005	BC Kalev/Cramo	70–64	TÜ/Rock	Kuressaare Sports Center	Kuressaare	Not awarded	
2006	24 September 2006	Tallinna BC Kalev/Cramo	97–92	TÜ/Rock	A. Le Coq Sports Hall	Tartu	Not awarded	
2007	30 September 2007	Tallinna BC Kalev/Cramo	71–62	TÜ/Rock	Rakvere Sports Hall	Rakvere	Not awarded	
2008	10 October 2008	BC Kalev/Cramo	90–61	TTÜ Korvpalliklubi	A. Le Coq Sports Hall	Tartu	Not awarded	
2009	11 October 2009	TÜ/Rock	67–55	Tallinna BC Kalev/Cramo	Saku Suurhall	Tallinn	Not awarded	
2010	30 December 2010	TÜ/Rock	81–51	BC Rakvere Tarvas	Rakvere Sports Hall	Rakvere	Not awarded	
2011	30 December 2011	Tartu Ülikool	87–81	BC Kalev/Cramo	Pärnu Sports Hall	Pärnu	(Estonia) Vallo Allingu	
2012	22 December 2012	BC Rakvere Tarvas	81–64	TYCO Rapla	A. Le Coq Sports Hall	Tartu	(Latvia) Māris Ļaksa	
2013	22 December 2013	TÜ/Rock	71–69	BC Kalev/Cramo	University of Tartu Sports Hall	Tartu	(Lithuania) Augustas Pečiukevičius	
2014	21 December 2014	TÜ/Rock	84–66	Rakvere Tarvas	Rakvere Sports Hall	Rakvere	(Estonia) Janar Talts	
2015	20 December 2015	BC Kalev/Cramo	73–55	TÜ/Rock	Kuressaare Sports Center	Kuressaare	(Estonia) Rain Veideman	
2016	18 December 2016	BC Kalev/Cramo	71–66	Tartu Ülikool	Pärnu Sports Hall	Pärnu	(United States) Demonte Harper	
2020	20 December 2020	BC Kalev/Cramo	95–56	Rakvere Tarvas	Rakvere Sports Hall	Rakvere	(Estonia) Kregor Hermet	
2021	19 December 2021	Tartu Ülikool Maks & Moorits	82–73	BC Kalev/Cramo	University of Tartu Sports Hall	Tartu	(Estonia) Märt Rosenthal	
2022	18 December 2022	BC Kalev/Cramo	77–64	Viimsi/Sportland	Narva Sports Center	Narva	(Estonia) Hugo Toom	
2024	17 February 2024	BC Kalev/Cramo	76–68	Tartu Ülikool Maks & Moorits	Kuressaare Sports Center	Kuressaare	(Finland) Severi Kaukiainen	
2025	15 February 2025	BC Kalev/Cramo	93–86	Tartu Ülikool Maks & Moorits	Nord Sports Hall	Tallinn	(Finland) Severi Kaukiainen	
2026	21 February 2026	Tartu Ülikool Maks & Moorits	86–75	Kalev/Cramo	Unibet Arena	Tallinn	(Estonia) Karl Johan Lips	

== Titles by team ==
Team	Winners	Winning years
Tartu Ülikool	18	1950, 1952, 1956, 1958, 1974, 1976, 1979, 2000, 2001 (2000–2001), 2002, 2004, 2009, 2010, 2011, 2013, 2014, 2021, 2026
BC Kalev	10	2005, 2006, 2007, 2008, 2015, 2016, 2020, 2022, 2024, 2025
Kalev	9	1946, 1948, 1968, 1969, 1972, 1992, 1993, 1996, 2001 (2001–2002)
TPI	7	1960, 1961, 1962, 1964, 1966, 1967, 1970
EPA	4	1957, 1959, 1963, 1965
Standard	2	1980, 1981
Harju KEK	2	1988, 1989
Keskrajoon	1	1971
EKE Projekt	1	1973
Metallist	1	1982
Nybit	1	1998
Tallinn	1	1999
TTÜ/A. Le Coq	1	2003
Rakvere Tarvas	1	2012

== Winning rosters ==
1998–99 Tallinn

Vjatšeslav Botškarjov, Arko Kask, Erki Kivinukk, Aivar Kuusmaa, Mait Käbin, Olev-Illimar Luiga, Margus Metstak, Indrek Rumma, Indrek Ruut, Kauri Sild, Meelis Songe, Raoul Suurorg, Tair Tenno, Rivo Turro, Reemo Veski (Coach: Üllar Kerde)

1999–00 Tartu Ülikool-Delta

Marek Doronin, Tanel Kaljula, Toomas Kandimaa, Tarmo Kikerpill, Aigar Kristovald, Marti Lasn, Jaanus Liivak, Toomas Liivak, Vallo Reinkort, Andrus Renter, Tanel Tein, Veljo Vares, Indrek Visnapuu (Coach: Teet Laur)

2000–01 Tartu Ülikool-Delta

Marek Doronin, Toomas Kandimaa, Tarmo Kikerpill, Aigar Kristovald, Jaanus Liivak, Toomas Liivak, Kuldar Lossmann, Rolandas Mačiulaitis, Ardi Niinepuu, Asko Paade, Rain Peerandi, Heiko Rannula, Vallo Reinkort, Tanel Tein, Veljo Vares, Antti Vasar (Coach: Jüri Neissaar)

2001–02 Kalev

Erik Dorbek, Priit Ilver, Tarmo Juhanson, Tanel Kaljula, Kristjan Kangur, Andres Kilk, Valmo Kriisa, Andrey Laletin, Kristjan Makke, Rauno Pehka, Indrek Rumma, Dan Shanks, Seth Sundberg, Alar Varrak (Coach: Üllar Kerde)

2002–03 Tartu Ülikool/Rock

Vallo Allingu, Marek Doronin, Toomas Kandimaa, Tarmo Kikerpill, Silver Leppik, Toomas Liivak, Asko Paade, Heiko Rannula, Vallo Reinkort, Andrus Renter, Tanel Tein, Antti Vasar, Martin Viiask (Coach: Jüri Neissaar)

2003–04 TTÜ/A. Le Coq

Mindaugas Budzinauskas, Larry Daniels, Gert Dorbek, Kert Kesküla, Karmo Allikas, Petri Virtanen, Andre Pärn, Aivar Kuusmaa, Krzysztof Wilangowski, Ivo Uibukant, Leho Kraav, Rauno Pehka (Coach: Heino Enden)

2004–05 Tartu Ülikool/Rock

Heiko Rannula, Rain Peerandi, Martin Viiask, Kristo Aab, Silver Leppik, Tarmo Kikerpill, Vallo Allingu, Marek Doronin, Asko Paade, Antti Vasar, Augenijus Vaškys, Marko Raamat (Coach: Tõnu Lust)

2005–06 Kalev/Cramo

Turner Battle, Erik Dorbek, Gert Dorbek, Karl-Peeter Dorbek, Víctor González, Tanel Kaljula, Rait Keerles, Sten Möldre, Heiko Niidas, Andre Pärn, Kristo Saage, Reimo Tamm, Veljo Vares, Ardo Ärmpalu (Coach: Aivar Kuusmaa)

2006–07 Kalev/Cramo

James Allen, Gregor Arbet, Erik Dorbek, Tanel Kaljula, Kristjan Kangur, Rait Keerles, Valmo Kriisa, Heiko Niidas, Travis Reed, Tanel Sokk (Coach: Veselin Matić)

2007–08 Kalev/Cramo

Marlon Parmer, Tanel Sokk, Martin Viiask, Valmo Kriisa, Bojan Pelkić, Vladimir Vuksanović, Travis Reed, Rait Keerles, Gregor Arbet, Kristjan Kangur, Kristo Saage (Coach: Veselin Matić)

2008–09 Kalev/Cramo

Gregor Arbet, Nate Fox, Indrek Kajupank, Kristjan Kangur, Rait Keerles, Valmo Kriisa, Tanel Kurbas, John Linehan, Martin Müürsepp, Josh Pace, Rain Raadik, Tanel Sokk, Viljar Veski (Coach: Nenad Vučinić)

2009–10 Tartu Ülikool/Rock

Sten Sokk, Todd Abernethy, Vallo Allingu, Janar Talts, Silver Leppik, Martin Viiask, Timo Eichfuss, Asko Paade, Sven Kaldre, Scott Morrison, Kristjan Kitsing (Coach: Indrek Visnapuu)

2010–11 Tartu Ülikool/Rock

Vallo Allingu, Marek Doronin, Timo Eichfuss, Kristjan Evart, Callistus Eziukwu, Joonas Järveläinen, Tanel Kurbas, Silver Leppik, Asko Paade, Rain Raadik, Sten Sokk, Janar Talts, Giorgi Tsintsadze, Rain Veideman (Coach: Indrek Visnapuu)

2011–12 Tartu Ülikool

Vallo Allingu, Marek Doronin, Timo Eichfuss, Taavi Leok, Tanel Kurbas, Silver Leppik, Asko Paade, Bill Amis, Sten Sokk, Kristo Saage, Rain Veideman, Kristjan Evart, Rain Raadik (Coach: Indrek Visnapuu)

2012–13 Rakvere Tarvas

Mihkel Schleicher, Brandis Raley-Ross, Renato Lindmets, Māris Ļaksa, Kaido Saks, Reimo Tamm, Raimond Tribuntsov, Andri Metsaru, Oliver Metsalu, Juris Umbraško, Kevin Täpp (Coach: Andres Sõber)

2013–14 Tartu Ülikool/Rock

Kent-Kaarel Vene, Gert Dorbek, Valmo Kriisa, Janar Talts, Timo Eichfuss, Saimon Sutt, Marek Doronin, Augustas Pečiukevičius, Kristen Meister, Vilmantas Dilys, Joosep Toome, Tanel Kurbas, Vincent Simpson (Coach: Gert Kullamäe)

2014–15 Tartu Ülikool/Rock

Tanel Sokk, Kent-Kaarel Vene, Gert Dorbek, Valmo Kriisa, Janar Talts, Timo Eichfuss, Saimon Sutt, Marek Doronin, Augustas Pečiukevičius, Kristen Meister, Karolis Petrukonis, Joosep Toome, Tanel Kurbas (Coach: Gert Kullamäe)

2015–16 Kalev/Cramo

Gregor Arbet, Josh Boone, Martin Dorbek, Rolands Freimanis, Silver Jurno, Erik Keedus, Sten Olmre, Brandis Raley-Ross, Sten Sokk, Janar Soo, Rain Veideman (Coach: Alar Varrak)

2016–17 Kalev/Cramo

Gregor Arbet, Martin Dorbek, Aleksandr Gavrilov, Mickell Gladness, Demonte Harper, Silver Jurno, Erik Keedus, Vitali Liutych, Cedric Simmons, Sten Sokk, Matthias Tass, Mark Tollefsen, Rain Veideman (Coach: Alar Varrak)

2020–21 Kalev/Cramo

Devin Thomas, Marcus Keene, Sten Sokk, Tanel Kurbas, Maurice Kemp, Kregor Hermet, Jānis Kaufmanis, Rauno Nurger, Janari Jõesaar, Martin Dorbek, Indrek Sunelik (Coach: Roberts Štelmahers)

2021–22 Tartu Ülikool

Märt Rosenthal, Adomas Drungilas, Edmunds Elksnis, Hendrik Eelmäe, Emmanuel Wembi, Robin Kivi, Kaspar Sepp, Lamonte Bearden, Oliver Suurorg, Patrik Saal, Joonas Anton Jürgenstein, Patrik Peemot (Coach: Nikolajs Mazurs)

2021–22 Kalev/Cramo

Taavi Jurkatamm, Alterique Gilbert, Wesley Van Beck, Tanel Kurbas, Artur Konontšuk, Hugo Toom, Kaspar Kitsing, Zigmārs Raimo, Martin Dorbek, Mārtiņš Meiers, Kristjan Kitsing, Oleksandr Kovliar (Coach: Heiko Rannula)

2023–24 Kalev/Cramo

Leemet Böckler, Martin Dorbek, Kregor Hermet, Mikk Jurkatamm, Kaspar Kitsing, Severi Kaukiainen, Mihkel Kirves, Tanel Kurbas, Rauno Nurger, Ben Shungu, Manny Suárez (Coach: Heiko Rannula)

2025–26 Tartu Ülikool

Rasmus Andre, Malcolm Bernard, Markus Ilver, Karl Gustav Jurtšenko, Rait-Riivo Laane, Karl Johan Lips, Bryce McBride, Rauno Nurger, Martin Paasoja, Dylan Painter, Hannes Saar, Robert Valge (Coach: Aivar Kuusmaa)

== See also ==
- Korvpalli Meistriliiga
