= Gregor Arbet =

Estonian basketball player

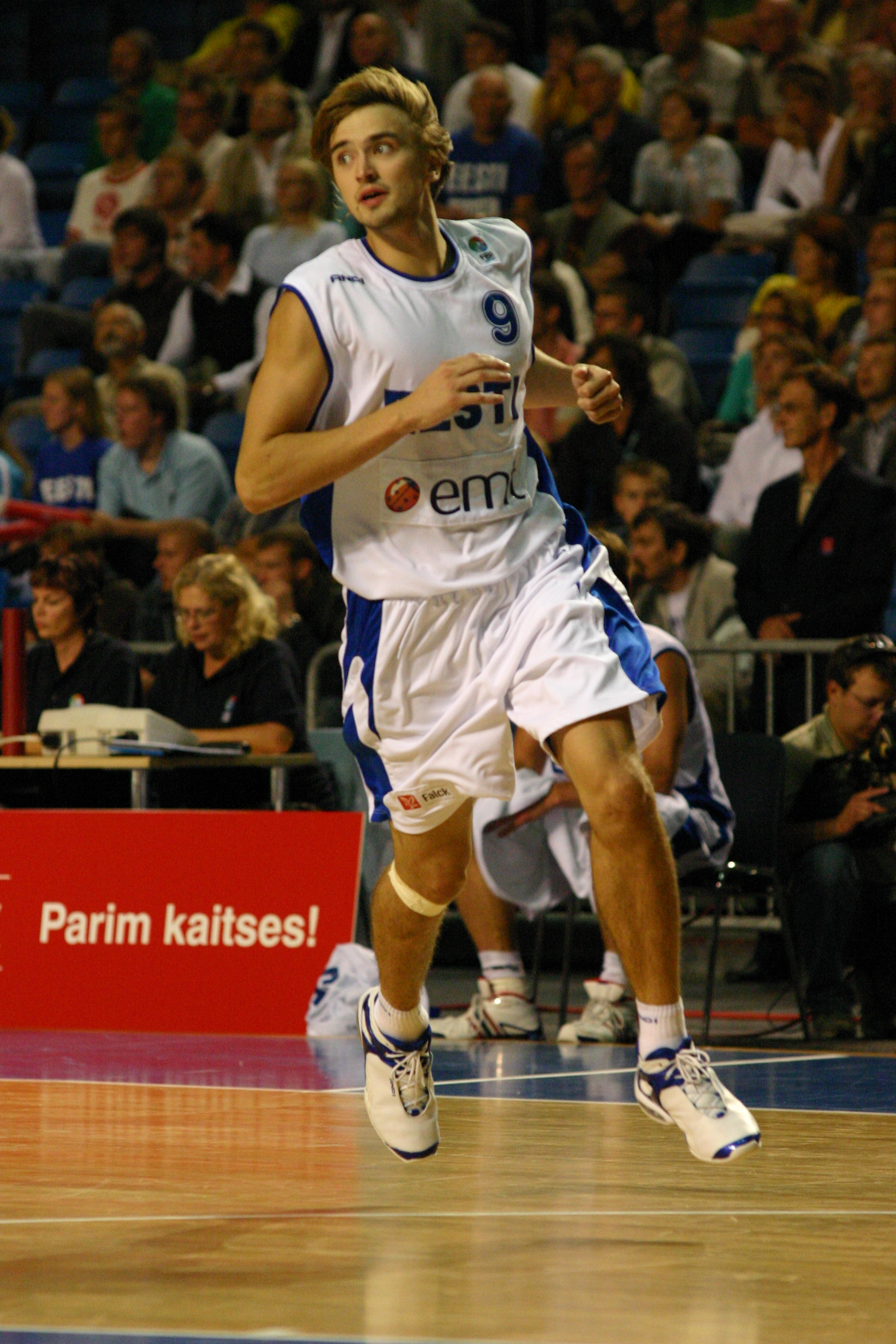
- Arbet in 2006

TalTech
- Title: Assistant coach
- League: Korvpalli Meistriliiga; Latvian-Estonian Basketball League

Personal information
- Born: 19 June 1983 (age 43) Tallinn, then part of Estonian SSR, Soviet Union
- Listed height: 1.96 m (6 ft 5 in)
- Listed weight: 90 kg (198 lb)

Career information
- NBA draft: 2005: undrafted
- Playing career: 2000–2020
- Position: Shooting guard / small forward
- Number: 13 (club), 9 (national team)
- Coaching career: 2020–present

Career history

Playing
- 2000–2002: Ehitustööriist/Kalev
- 2002–2004: Kalev
- 2004–2005: DJK Würzburg
- 2005–2006: Dalkia/Nybit
- 2006–2013: BC Kalev
- 2013: Kavala
- 2013–2014: Rethymno Aegean
- 2014–2018: BC Kalev
- 2018–2020: TalTech

Coaching
- 2020–: TalTech (assistant)

Career highlights
- VTB United League Hall of Fame (2019); VTB United League Top Estonian Player (2016); 8× Estonian League champion (2003, 2009, 2011, 2012, 2014, 2016–2018); 5× Estonian Cup winner (2006–2008, 2015, 2016); Estonian League Best Defender (2014); 5× Estonian League First Team (2006, 2011, 2012, 2015, 2016)

Gregor Arbet (born 19 June 1983) is a former Estonian professional basketball player and the current assistant coach for TalTech of the Estonian Korvpalli Meistriliiga. He is a 1.96 m (6 ft 5 in) tall shooting guard and small forward. He represented the Estonian national basketball team internationally from 2002 to 2019.

== Professional career ==
Arbet began his professional career in 2000 with Ehitustööriist of the Korvpalli Meistriliiga (KML). In 2002, Arbet signed with the Estonian champions Kalev. In 2003, he won his first Estonian Championship, after Kalev defeated TTÜ/A. Le Coq in the finals.

In 2004, he joined DJK Würzburg. In 2005, the club resigned from the Basketball Bundesliga and stopped competing. Arbet returned to Estonia and joined Dalkia/Nybit. Dalkia/Nybit finished the 2005–06 season in third place and Arbet was named to the All-KML Team.

In 2006, Arbet signed for Kalev (former Ehitustööriist). With Kalev, Arbet won his second Estonian Championship in the 2008–09 season, when Kalev defeated University of Tartu 4 games to 2 in the finals. He won two more Estonian Championship in 2011 and 2012 and was named to the All-KML Team in both seasons.

On 14 January 2013, Arbet left Kalev to join Kavala of the Greek Basket League. Kavala finished the 2012–13 season last, in 14th place, while Arbet averaged 10.7 points, 3.4 rebounds and 1.3 assists per game.

On 26 September 2013, Arbet signed for Rethymno Aegean. He left the club in January 2014 and returned to Kalev. Arbet won his fifth Estonian Championship in the 2013–14 season, after Kalev swept University of Tartu in the finals, and was named KML Best Defender. Kalev failed to defend the title in the 2014–15 season and finished as runners-ups. At the conclusion of the season, Arbet was named to the All-KML Team. He won his sixth Estonian Championship in the 2015–16 season, after Kalev defeated University of Tartu in the finals, winning the series 4 games to 1 and was once again named to the All-KML Team. In the 2015–16 VTB United League season, Arbet averaged 10.4 points, 3.4 rebounds and 1.5 assists per game and was named VTB United League Top Estonian Player.

== National team career ==
As a member of the senior Estonian national basketball team, Arbet competed at the EuroBasket 2015, averaging 11.6 points, 2.4 rebounds and 0.8 assists in 28 minutes per game. He was the team's scoring leader with 26 points in a 78–71 victory against Ukraine, Estonia's first EuroBasket victory since 1993. Estonia finished the tournament in 20th place.

== Personal life ==
Arbet's sister Kerdu Arbet-Lenear is retired basketball player who represented the Estonian women's national basketball team internationally.

Arbet has a son, Geron (born 14 June 2013), with his wife Ly Siht.

== Awards and accomplishments ==
=== Professional career ===
Tallinna Kalev

- Estonian League champion: 2003

Kalev

- 7× Estonian League champion: 2009, 2011, 2012, 2014, 2016, 2017, 2018
- 5× Estonian Cup winner: 2006, 2007, 2008, 2015, 2016

=== Individual ===
- KML Best Defender: 2014
- 5× All-KML Team: 2006, 2011, 2012, 2015, 2016
- VTB United League Top Estonian Player: 2016
- VTB United League Hall of Fame: 2019
