= 2009–10 KML season =

Estonian national championships in basketball

G4S Korvpalli Meistriliiga^{1}
- Season: 2009–10
- Duration: 13 October 2009 – 14 May 2010
- Teams: 8

Regular season
- Top seed: TÜ/Rock

Finals
- Champions: TÜ/Rock; 25th title
- Runners-up: Rakvere Tarvas
- Third place: Tallinna Kalev/Cramo
- Fourth place: TTÜ
- Finals MVP: (Estonia) Janar Talts

Statistical leaders
Points	(United States) Charron Fisher	22.41
Rebounds	(United States) Brett McGee	10.96
Assists	(Estonia) Valmo Kriisa	4.51
- ^{1} Sponsored league name, referring to G4S.

The 2009–10 G4S Korvpalli Meistriliiga was the 85th season of the Estonian basketball league and the first under the title sponsorship of G4S. Tallinna Kalev/Cramo came into the season as defending champions of the 2008–09 KML season.

The season started on 13 October 2009 and concluded on 14 May 2010 with TÜ/Rock defeating Rakvere Tarvas 4 games to 2 in the 2015 KML Finals to win their 25th Estonian League title.

== Teams ==
Team	Location	Arena	Capacity	Head coach
Kuremaa/Tartu	Põltsamaa	Põltsamaa Felixhall		(Estonia) Priit Paama
Pärnu	Pärnu	Pärnu Sports Hall	2,000	(Estonia) Rait Käbin
Rakvere Tarvas	Rakvere	Rakvere Sports Hall	3,000	(Estonia) Andres Sõber
Tallinna Kalev	Tallinn	Kalev Sports Hall	6,950	(Estonia) Kalle Klandorf
Tallinna Kalev/Cramo	Tallinn	Saku Arena	7,500	(Estonia) Alar Varrak (New Zealand) Nenad Vučinić
TTÜ	Tallinn	TTÜ Sports Hall	2,000	(Estonia) Aivar Kuusmaa
TÜ/Rock	Tartu	University of Tartu Sports Hall	4,000	(Estonia) Indrek Visnapuu
Valga/CKE Inkasso	Valga	Valga Sports Hall	2,000	(Lithuania) Augenijus Vaškys

== Regular season ==
=== League table ===
Pos	Team	Pld	W	L	Pts	PCT	Qualification
1	TÜ/Rock	28	23	5	51	.821	Qualification to Playoffs
2	Rakvere Tarvas	28	22	6	50	.786	Qualification to Playoffs
3	TTÜ	28	20	8	48	.714	Qualification to Playoffs
4	Tallinna Kalev/Cramo	28	19	9	47	.679	Qualification to Playoffs
5	Valga/CKE Inkasso	28	11	17	39	.393	Qualification to Playoffs
6	Tallinna Kalev	28	9	19	37	.321	Qualification to Playoffs
7	Pärnu	28	7	21	35	.250	
8	Kuremaa/Tartu	28	1	27	29	.036	

Updated to match(es) played on 25 March 2010. Source: KML (2009/2010)

== Playoffs ==
The playoffs began on 28 March 2010 and ended on 14 May 2010. The tournament concluded with TÜ/Rock defeating Rakvere Tarvas 4 games to 2 in the 2010 KML Finals.

=== Bracket ===
Quarterfinals
4	Tallinna Kalev/Cramo	2
5	Valga/CKE Inkasso	1
3	TTÜ	2
6	Tallinna Kalev	1

Semifinals
1	TÜ/Rock	3
4	Tallinna Kalev/Cramo	2
2	Rakvere Tarvas	3
3	TTÜ	2

Finals
1	TÜ/Rock	4
2	Rakvere Tarvas	2
Third place
3	TTÜ	0
4	Tallinna Kalev/Cramo	2

== Individual statistics ==
Players qualify to this category by having at least 50% games played.

=== Points ===
Rank	Player	Team	Games	Points	PPG
1	(United States) Charron Fisher	Tallinna Kalev/Cramo	29	650	22.41
2	(United States) Brett McGee	Kuremaa/Tartu	26	498	19.15
3	(United States) Travis Reed	Tallinna Kalev	26	430	16.54
4	(United States) Nicholas Covington	Tallinna Kalev	29	476	16.41
5	(Estonia) Valmo Kriisa	Rakvere Tarvas	37	589	15.92

=== Rebounds ===
Rank	Player	Team	Games	Rebounds	RPG
1	(United States) Brett McGee	Kuremaa/Tartu	26	285	10.96
2	(United States) Travis Reed	Tallinna Kalev	26	240	9.23
3	(Estonia) Joosep Toome	TÜ/Rock	36	317	8.81
4	(United States) Charron Fisher	Tallinna Kalev/Cramo	29	244	8.41
5	(Lithuania) Giedrius Rinkevičius	Valga/CKE Inkasso	15	120	8.00

=== Assists ===
Rank	Player	Team	Games	Assists	APG
1	(Estonia) Valmo Kriisa	Rakvere Tarvas	37	167	4.51
2	(Estonia) Tanel Sokk	Tallinna Kalev/Cramo	26	96	3.69
3	(Estonia) Heiko Rannula	Valga/CKE Inkasso	29	93	3.21
4	(United States) Derek Winston	Kuremaa/Tartu	25	66	2.64
5	(Estonia) Kristo Saage	Rakvere Tarvas	36	94	2.61

== Awards ==
=== Finals MVP ===
- (Estonia) Janar Talts (TÜ/Rock)

=== Coach of the Year ===
- (Estonia) Andres Sõber (Rakvere Tarvas)

=== All-KML Team ===
Pos	Player	Team
PG	(Estonia) Valmo Kriisa	Rakvere Tarvas
SG	(Estonia) Rain Veideman	Rakvere Tarvas
SF	(United States) Charron Fisher	Tallinna Kalev/Cramo
PF	(Estonia) Janar Talts	TÜ/Rock
C	(United States) Scott Morrison	TÜ/Rock
