= 2012–13 KML season =

Estonian national championships in basketball

G4S Korvpalli Meistriliiga^{1}
- Season: 2012–13
- Duration: 10 October 2012 – 17 May 2013
- Games played: 114 (Regular season); 26 (Playoffs)
- Teams: 9
- TV partner(s): ETV2

Regular season
- Top seed: Kalev/Cramo

Finals
- Champions: Kalev/Cramo; 6th title
- Runners-up: TÜ/Rock
- Third place: Rakvere Tarvas
- Fourth place: TYCO Rapla
- Finals MVP: (Estonia) Tanel Sokk

Awards
- Best Defender: (Estonia) Martin Dorbek
- Best Young Player: (Estonia) Rait-Riivo Laane
- Coach of the Year: (Estonia) Alar Varrak

Statistical leaders
Points	(Estonia) Reimo Tamm	16.36
Rebounds	(Estonia) Rain Raadik	11.38
Assists	(Lithuania) Augustas Pečiukevičius	5.29
- ^{1} Sponsored league name, referring to G4S.

The 2012–13 G4S Korvpalli Meistriliiga was the 88th season of the Estonian basketball league and the fourth under the title sponsorship of G4S. Kalev/Cramo came into the season as defending champions of the 2011–12 KML season.

The season started on 10 October 2012 and concluded on 17 May 2013 with Kalev/Cramo defeating TÜ/Rock 4 games to 0 in the finals to win their 6th Estonian League title.

== Teams ==
Locations of the 2012–13 G4S Korvpalli Meistriliiga teams

Team	Location	Arena	Capacity	Head coach
Kalev/Cramo	Tallinn	Saku Suurhall Arena	7,500	(Estonia) Alar Varrak
TÜ/Rock	Tartu	University of Tartu Sports Hall	4,000	(Estonia) Gert Kullamäe
Rakvere Tarvas	Rakvere	Rakvere Sports Hall	3,000	(Estonia) Andres Sõber
TYCO Rapla	Rapla	Sadolin Sports Hall	5,000	(Estonia) Indrek Ruut
TTÜ	Tallinn	TTÜ Sports Hall	2,000	(Estonia) Tiit Sokk
Tallinna Kalev	Tallinn	Kalev Sports Hall	6,950	(Estonia) Kalle Klandorf
Pärnu	Pärnu	Pärnu Sports Hall	2,000	(Estonia) Priit Vene
Valga/Maks & Moorits	Valga	Valga Sports Hall	2,000	(Estonia) Tarmo Petter
HITO	Jõhvi	Jõhvi Sports Hall	500	(Estonia) Priit Sternhof

== Regular season ==
Pos	Team	GP	W	L	Pts	PCT	Qualification
1	Kalev/Cramo	32	28	4	60	.875	Qualification to Playoffs
2	TÜ/Rock	32	28	4	60	.875	Qualification to Playoffs
3	Rakvere Tarvas	32	20	12	52	.625	Qualification to Playoffs
4	TTÜ	32	16	16	48	.500	Qualification to Playoffs
5	TYCO Rapla	32	14	18	46	.438	Qualification to Playoffs
6	Pärnu	32	13	19	45	.406	Qualification to Playoffs
7	Valga/Maks & Moorits	32	13	19	45	.406	Qualification to Playoffs
8	Tallinna Kalev	32	9	23	41	.281	Qualification to Playoffs
9	HITO	32	3	29	35	.094	

== Playoffs ==
Quarter-finals
1	Kalev/Cramo	3
8	Tallinna Kalev	0
4	TTÜ	0
5	TYCO Rapla	3
2	TÜ/Rock	3
7	Valga/Maks & Moorits	0
3	Rakvere Tarvas	3
6	Pärnu	1

Semi-finals
1	Kalev/Cramo	3
5	TYCO Rapla	0
2	TÜ/Rock	3
3	Rakvere Tarvas	0

Finals
1	Kalev/Cramo	4
2	TÜ/Rock	0
Third place
5	TYCO Rapla	1
3	Rakvere Tarvas	2

== Individual statistics ==
Players qualify to this category by having at least 50% games played.

=== Points ===
Rank	Player	Team	Games	Points	PPG
1	(Estonia) Reimo Tamm	Rakvere Tarvas	36	589	16.36
2	(Lithuania) Augustas Pečiukevičius	Pärnu	31	503	16.23
3	(Latvia) Māris Ļaksa	Rakvere Tarvas	38	572	15.05
4	(United States) Brandis Raley-Ross	Rakvere Tarvas	31	465	15.00
5	(Estonia) Kiur Akenpärg	TTÜ	30	450	15.00

=== Rebounds ===
Rank	Player	Team	Games	Rebounds	RPG
1	(Estonia) Rain Raadik	Pärnu	29	330	11.38
2	(United States) Emmanuel Okoye	Tallinna Kalev	31	330	10.65
3	(United States) Frank Elegar	Kalev/Cramo	23	208	9.04
4	(Estonia) Edvard Trumm	HITO	27	211	8.19
5	(Estonia) Renato Lindmets	Rakvere Tarvas	26	192	7.38

=== Assists ===
Rank	Player	Team	Games	Assists	APG
1	(Lithuania) Augustas Pečiukevičius	Pärnu	31	164	5.29
2	(Estonia) Erik Keedus	TTÜ	31	148	4.77
3	(United States) Justin Ingram	TÜ/Rock	24	105	4.38
4	(United States) Brandis Raley-Ross	Rakvere Tarvas	31	125	4.03
5	(Estonia) Reimo Tamm	Rakvere Tarvas	36	139	3.86

== Awards ==
=== Finals MVP ===
- (Estonia) Tanel Sokk (Kalev/Cramo)

=== Best Defender ===
- (Estonia) Martin Dorbek (TYCO Rapla)

=== Best Young Player ===
- (Estonia) Rait-Riivo Laane (TYCO Rapla)

=== Coach of the Year ===
- (Estonia) Alar Varrak (Kalev/Cramo)

=== All-KML team ===
Pos	Player	Team
PG	(Estonia) Tanel Sokk	Kalev/Cramo
SG	(United States) Brandis Raley-Ross	Rakvere Tarvas
SF	(Latvia) Juris Umbraško	Rakvere Tarvas
PF	(United States) Frank Elegar	Kalev/Cramo
C	(Senegal) Bamba Fall	Kalev/Cramo

=== Player of the Month ===
Month	Player	Team
October	(Estonia) Reimo Tamm	Rakvere Tarvas
November	(Estonia) Renato Lindmets	Rakvere Tarvas
December	(Lithuania) Augustas Pečiukevičius	Pärnu
January	(Estonia) Heiko Rannula	Valga/Maks & Moorits
February	(Estonia) Rain Raadik	Pärnu
March	(United States) Frank Elegar	Kalev/Cramo

== See also ==
- 2012–13 EuroChallenge
- 2012–13 VTB United League
- 2012–13 Baltic Basketball League
