= Alar Varrak =

Estonian basketball player and coach

TalTech
- Title: Head coach
- League: Korvpalli Meistriliiga; Latvian–Estonian Basketball League; European North Basketball League

Personal information
- Born: April 20, 1982 (age 44) Jõgeva, then part of Estonian SSR, Soviet Union
- Listed height: 6 ft 0 in (1.83 m)

Career information
- Playing career: 1999–2005
- Position: Point guard
- Coaching career: 2006–present

Career history

Playing
- 1999–2002: Tallinna Kalev
- 2002–2003: Ehitustööriist/Kalev
- 2003–2004: Tallinna Kalev
- 2004–2005: Audentese Ülikool

Coaching
- 2006–2007: Noortekoondis/Audentes (assistant)
- 2007–2008: Noortekoondis/Triobet
- 2007–2008: Triobet/Dalkia (assistant)
- 2008–2017: Estonia (assistant)
- 2008–2012: BC Kalev (assistant)
- 2012–2017: BC Kalev
- 2018: Dzūkija Alytus
- 2018–2019: Estonia (assistant)
- 2019: Ural Yekaterinburg
- 2020–2021: BC Kalev (assistant)
- 2021–present: TalTech

Career highlights
- As player: Korvpalli Meistriliiga champion (2002); Estonian Basketball Cup winner (2001); As coach: 3× KML Coach of the Year (2013, 2014, 2016); 7× Korvpalli Meistriliiga champion (2009, 2011–2014, 2016, 2017); 4× Estonian Basketball Cup winner (2008, 2015, 2016, 2020); I Liiga champion (2007)
Medals
Men's basketball
Head Coach for Estonia
FIBA Europe U-20 Championship Division B
Bronze medal – third place	2022 Georgia	U20 Team

Alar Varrak (born 20 April 1982) is an Estonian basketball coach and a former point guard. He is the head coach of TalTech/ALEXELA of in the Estonian–Latvian Basketball League.

== Career ==
Varrak was born in Jõgeva, and spent his short playing career in the Estonian League. In 2008 he became the assistant coach of Kalev/Cramo and succeeded Aivar Kuusmaa as the head coach on 24 November 2012. Varrak was fired from Kalev/Cramo in November 2017. In January 2018 he became the head coach of Lithuanian League team Dzūkija Alytus. He left for health reasons in April. In July 2018 he was elected as the sporting director of the Estonian Basketball Association. He resigned from the sporting director position in July 2019 and signed with Russian Basketball Super League 1 team Ural Yekaterinburg. He was fired from the team in November 2019 due to poor results.

== Personal life ==
His half brother is Brett Nõmm who is also a professional basketball coach.

== Achievements with club ==
=== As player ===
Tallinna Kalev

- Korvpalli Meistriliiga (1): 2001–02
- Estonian Basketball Cup (1): 2001

=== As coach ===
Noortekoondis/Audentes

- I Liiga (1): 2007

Kalev/Cramo

- Korvpalli Meistriliiga (7): 2008–09, 2010–11, 2011–12, 2012–13, 2013–14, 2015–16, 2016–17
- Estonian Basketball Cup (4): 2008, 2015, 2016, 2020

== Season by season results as head coach ==
Abbreviations:
SF; semi finals.
T16; top sixteen.
RS; regular season (group stage).
QR2; qualification round 2.
DNP; did not participate.

League	Club	Season	Domestic Competitions		Regional Competitions		European Competitions	
League	Club	Season	Championship	Cup	BBL	VTB	Competition	Position
Korvpalli Meistriliiga	Kalev/Cramo	2012–13	1st	3rd	3rd	RS	DNP	
Korvpalli Meistriliiga	Kalev/Cramo	2013–14	1st	2nd	DNP	RS	2 EuroCup	RS
Korvpalli Meistriliiga	Kalev/Cramo	2014–15	2nd	3rd	T16	9th	DNP	
Korvpalli Meistriliiga	Kalev/Cramo	2015–16	1st	1st	DNP	14th	3 Europe Cup	RS
Korvpalli Meistriliiga	Kalev/Cramo	2016–17	1st	1st	4th	11th	DNP	
Korvpalli Meistriliiga	Kalev/Cramo	2017–18	(fired)	No comp.	DNP	(fired)	3 Champions League	QR2
Lietuvos krepšinio lyga	Dzūkija Alytus	2017–18	(resigned)	SF	DNP	DNP	DNP	
Super League 1	Ural Yekaterinburg	2019–20	(fired)	(fired)	No comp.	DNP	DNP	

== See also ==
- Estonia national basketball team
- Estonian League
- Kalev/Cramo
