= 2014–15 KML season =

Estonian national championships in basketball

Alexela Korvpalli Meistriliiga^{1}
- Season: 2014–15
- Duration: 4 October 2014 – 22 May 2015
- Games played: 108 (Regular season); 31 (Playoffs)
- Teams: 9
- TV partner(s): TV6, Delfi TV

Regular season
- Top seed: TÜ/Rock

Finals
- Champions: TÜ/Rock; 26th title
- Runners-up: Kalev/Cramo
- Third place: TYCO Rapla
- Fourth place: Rakvere Tarvas
- Finals MVP: (Estonia) Tanel Kurbas

Awards
- Best Defender: (Estonia) Janar Talts
- Best Young Player: (Estonia) Siim-Markus Post
- Coach of the Year: (Estonia) Gert Kullamäe

Statistical leaders
Points	(United States) Brandis Raley-Ross	22.11
Rebounds	(Latvia) Jurijs Aleksejevs	10.63
Assists	(United States) Scott Machado	4.50
- All statistics correct as of 22 May 2015.^{1} Sponsored league name, referring to Alexela.

The 2014–15 Alexela Korvpalli Meistriliiga was the 90th season of the Estonian basketball league and the second under the title sponsorship of Alexela. Kalev/Cramo came into the season as defending champions of the 2013–14 KML season.

The season started on 4 October 2014 and concluded on 22 May 2015 with TÜ/Rock defeating Kalev/Cramo 4 games to 1 in the 2015 KML Finals to win their 26th Estonian League title.

== Teams ==
Locations of the 2014–15 Alexela Korvpalli Meistriliiga teams

Team	Location	Arena	Capacity	Head coach
Kalev/Cramo	Tallinn	Saku Arena	7,500	(Estonia) Alar Varrak
TÜ/Rock	Tartu	University of Tartu Sports Hall	4,000	(Estonia) Gert Kullamäe
Rakvere Tarvas	Rakvere	Rakvere Sports Hall	3,000	(Estonia) Andres Sõber
TLÜ/Kalev	Tallinn	Kalev Sports Hall	6,950	(Estonia) Kalle Klandorf
TTÜ	Tallinn	TTÜ Sports Hall	2,000	(Estonia) Heino Lill
Pärnu	Pärnu	Pärnu Sports Hall	2,000	(Estonia) Mait Käbin
TYCO Rapla	Rapla	Sadolin Sports Hall	5,000	(Estonia) Aivar Kuusmaa
Valga/Maks & Moorits	Valga	Valga Sports Hall	2,000	(Latvia) Varis Krūmiņš
Audentes/Noortekoondis	Tallinn	Audentes Sports Center		(Estonia) Indrek Visnapuu

== Coaching changes ==
Pre-season
Team	Outgoing coach	Incoming coach
Valga/Maks & Moorits	(Latvia) Sandis Buškevics	(Latvia) Varis Krūmiņš
TTÜ	(Estonia) Tiit Sokk	(Estonia) Heino Lill
Pärnu	(Serbia) Darko Ivanović	(Estonia) Mait Käbin

== Regular season ==
During the regular season teams will play 4 rounds for 32 games (2 at home and 2 away) with following exceptions:

- Kalev/Cramo will play 1 round at home and 1 away (1 at home and 1 away in total).
- TÜ/Rock will play 1 round at home (1 at home and 2 away in total).
- Audentes/Noortekoondis will play 1 round at home and 1 away (1 at home and 1 away in total).

Double points will be awarded to teams winning those games.

=== League table ===
Pos	Team	Pld	W	L	Pts	PCT	Qualification
1	TÜ/Rock	32	26	6	58	.813	Qualification to Playoffs
2	Kalev/Cramo	32	26	6	58	.813	Qualification to Playoffs
3	TYCO Rapla	32	21	11	53	.656	Qualification to Playoffs
4	Rakvere Tarvas	32	20	12	52	.625	Qualification to Playoffs
5	Pärnu	32	15	17	47	.469	Qualification to Playoffs
6	Valga/Maks & Moorits	32	15	17	47	.469	Qualification to Playoffs
7	TTÜ	32	12	20	44	.375	Qualification to Playoffs
8	TLÜ/Kalev	32	7	25	39	.219	Qualification to Playoffs
9	Audentes	32	2	30	34	.063	

Updated to match(es) played on 4 April 2015. Source: KML

=== First half of the season ===
Home \ Away	KAL	ROC	TAR	TLÜ	TTÜ	PÄR	RAP	VAL	AUD
Kalev/Cramo		68–57	89–80	105–63	80–70	94–56	86–65	77–83	123–46
TÜ/Rock	66–54		93–85	72–56	86–77	90–63	68–74	90–62	121–61
Rakvere Tarvas	79–89	75–71		89–67	80–76	87–94	73–65	95–93	101–73
TLÜ/Kalev	52–89	54–85	82–80		78–67	71–79	54–68	85–79	83–91
TTÜ	62–88	51–78	53–70	79–64		90–70	69–84	91–89	120–44
Pärnu	62–88	58–98	91–79	65–49	56–64		77–75	82–78	116–75
TYCO Rapla	69–96	64–87	61–68	86–65	89–71	92–68		77–61	98–51
Valga/Maks & Moorits	92–88	61–65	85–97	73–66	100–91	86–80	68–83		92–72
Audentes/Noortekoondis	46–102	42–99	79–92	77–94	62–96	62–100	59–88	72–112	

Legend: Blue = home team win; Yellow = draw; Red = away team win.

=== Second half of the season ===
Home \ Away	KAL	ROC	TAR	TLÜ	TTÜ	PÄR	RAP	VAL	AUD
Kalev/Cramo									
TÜ/Rock									
Rakvere Tarvas		57–85		97–60	91–93	102–76	80–84	101–73	
TLÜ/Kalev		72–93	60–90		71–65	81–94	63–81	73–64	
TTÜ		55–75	78–82	78–50		82–76	71–68	84–89	
Pärnu		88–69	73–91	84–70	73–64		68–76	92–73	
TYCO Rapla		68–84	66–69	93–81	86–78	80–75		72–64	
Valga/Maks & Moorits		72–89	71–83	88–61	77–76	80–71	70–73		
Audentes/Noortekoondis									

Legend: Blue = home team win; Yellow = draw; Red = away team win.

== Playoffs ==
The playoffs began on 7 April and ended on 22 May. The tournament concluded with TÜ/Rock defeating Kalev/Cramo 4 games to 1 in the 2015 KML Finals.

=== Bracket ===
Quarter-finals
1	TÜ/Rock	3
8	TLÜ/Kalev	0
4	Rakvere Tarvas	3
5	Pärnu	2
2	Kalev/Cramo	3
7	TTÜ	0
3	TYCO Rapla	3
6	Valga/Maks & Moorits	1

Semi-finals
1	TÜ/Rock	3
4	Rakvere Tarvas	2
2	Kalev/Cramo	3
3	TYCO Rapla	0

Finals
1	TÜ/Rock	4
2	Kalev/Cramo	1
Third place
3	TYCO Rapla	2
4	Rakvere Tarvas	1

== Individual statistics ==
Players qualify to this category by having at least 50% games played.

=== Points ===
Rank	Player	Team	Games	Points	PPG
1	(United States) Brandis Raley-Ross	Rakvere Tarvas	37	818	22.11
2	(Latvia) Jurijs Aleksejevs	Valga/Maks & Moorits	30	535	17.83
3	(Latvia) Reinis Strupovičs	Valga/Maks & Moorits	30	523	17.43
4	(Croatia) Domagoj Bubalo	TYCO Rapla	25	401	16.04
5	(United States) Keith Benson	Kalev/Cramo	14	224	16.00

=== Rebounds ===
Rank	Player	Team	Games	Rebounds	RPG
1	(Latvia) Jurijs Aleksejevs	Valga/Maks & Moorits	30	319	10.63
2	(Estonia) Janar Talts	TÜ/Rock	32	290	9.06
3	(Lithuania) Robertas Grabauskas	TLÜ/Kalev	31	269	8.68
4	(Estonia) Jaan Puidet	TTÜ	27	223	8.26
5	(United States) David Haughton	Rakvere Tarvas	35	279	7.97

=== Assists ===
Rank	Player	Team	Games	Assists	APG
1	(United States) Scott Machado	Kalev/Cramo	20	90	4.50
2	(Latvia) Sandis Silavs	Pärnu	31	136	4.39
3	(Estonia) Rait-Riivo Laane	TYCO Rapla	36	155	4.31
4	(Estonia) Jaan Puidet	TTÜ	27	116	4.30
5	(Lithuania) Augustas Pečiukevičius	TÜ/Rock	26	108	4.15

== Awards ==
=== Finals MVP ===
- (Estonia) Tanel Kurbas (TÜ/Rock)

=== Best Defender ===
- (Estonia) Janar Talts (TÜ/Rock)

=== Best Young Player ===
- (Estonia) Siim-Markus Post (Audentes/Noortekoondis)

=== Coach of the Year ===
- (Estonia) Gert Kullamäe (TÜ/Rock)

=== All-KML team ===
Pos	Player	Team
PG	(United States) Scott Machado	Kalev/Cramo
SG	(United States) Brandis Raley-Ross	Rakvere Tarvas
SF	(Estonia) Gregor Arbet	Kalev/Cramo
PF	(Estonia) Janar Talts	TÜ/Rock
C	(Croatia) Domagoj Bubalo	TYCO Rapla

=== Player of the Month ===
Month	Player	Team
October	(Latvia) Kristers Zeidaks	TYCO Rapla
November	(United States) Brandis Raley-Ross	Rakvere Tarvas
December	(Latvia) Jurijs Aleksejevs	Valga/Maks & Moorits
January	(Estonia) Janar Talts	TÜ/Rock
February	(Croatia) Domagoj Bubalo	TYCO Rapla
March	(United States) Brandis Raley-Ross	Rakvere Tarvas

== See also ==
- 2014–15 EuroChallenge
- 2014–15 VTB United League
- 2014–15 Baltic Basketball League
