= Rain Veideman =

Estonian basketball player (born 1991)

Haljala NGU
- Position: Shooting guard
- League: I liiga

Personal information
- Born: 1 October 1991 (age 35) Haljala, Estonia
- Listed height: 1.92 m (6 ft 4 in)
- Listed weight: 90 kg (198 lb)

Career information
- NBA draft: 2013: undrafted
- Playing career: 2008–present

Career history
- 2008–2009: Kuremaa
- 2009–2010: Rakvere Tarvas
- 2010–2013: Tartu Ülikool
- 2012: →BBC Bayreuth
- 2013–2017: BC Kalev
- 2017–2018: APU Udine
- 2018: Rapla
- 2018–2019: Stings Mantova
- 2019: Rakvere Tarvas
- 2019–2020: Eurobasket Roma
- 2020–2021: Rostock Seawolves
- 2021: Stings Mantova
- 2021–2022: KK Viimsi
- 2022–2023: BC Tallinna Kalev
- 2023–2025: Tartu Ülikool
- 2025–present: Haljala NGU

Career highlights
- 2× Estonian League champion (2014, 2016); 4× Estonian Cup winner (2010, 2011, 2015, 2016); Baltic League Cup winner (2010); 2× All-Estonian League Team (2010, 2014); Estonian League Best Young Player (2011); Estonian League All-Star (2017); Estonian League All-Star Game MVP (2017); 2× VTB United League Top Estonian Player (2014, 2015)
Medals
Representing Estonia
Men's basketball
FIBA Europe U-20 Championship Division B
Silver medal – second place	2011 Bosnia and Herzegovina	U20 Team

Rain Veideman (born 1 October 1991) is an Estonian professional basketball player for Haljala NGU of the Saku I liiga. He has also represented the Estonian national basketball team internationally. Standing at a height of 1.92 m (6 ft 4 in), he primarily plays the shooting guard position.

== Professional career ==
Veideman began playing basketball with sPORTKUNDA/Rakvere. He began his professional career in 2008, at the age of 17, with Kuremaa of the Korvpalli Meistriliiga. Kuremaa finished the 2008–09 season in last place, despite Veideman averaging 10.9 points per game.

In 2009, he transferred to Rakvere Tarvas. The team finished the 2009–10 season as runners-up, with Veideman averaging 15.1 points per game. He was named to the All-KML Team.

In 2010, Veideman signed for the Estonian champions TÜ/Rock. In the 2010–11 season, Veideman averaged 15.6 points per game and won the KML Best Young Player Award. On 4 February 2012, Veideman was loaned to Bayreuth of the Basketball Bundesliga for the remainder of the season. In Germany, Veideman averaged 7.5 points per game as Bayreuth finished the 2011–12 season in 13th place. Veideman returned to TÜ/Rock for the 2012–13 season.

On 30 July 2013, Veideman signed for Kalev/Cramo. Kalev/Cramo won the 2013–14 Estonian League championship. Veideman averaged 9.2 points per game and was named to the All-KML Team. In the 2013–14 VTB United League season, Veideman averaged 8.7 points per game and was named Top Estonian Player of the league. He averaged 11.7 points per game in the 2014–15 VTB United League season and was named Top Estonian Player for the second time. Veideman won his second Estonian Championship in the 2015–16 season, after Kalev/Cramo defeated TÜ/Rock in the finals, winning the series 4 games to 1.

On 5 March 2017, Veideman left Kalev/Cramo and signed for G.S.A. Udine of the Serie A2. He stayed with the team for the next season. Veideman returned to Estonia in the beginning of 2018–19 season and signed with AVIS Utilitas Rapla. In December 2018 he signed with Pompea Mantovana and returned to Italian Serie A2. He scored 28 points in 30 minutes on his debut against Hertz Cagliari. He started the 2019–20 season in his hometown club Rakvere Tarvas. In December 2019 Veideman started his third stint in Italy as he signed with Serie A2 team Eurobasket Roma.

On 11 August 2021, Veideman signed with KK Viimsi of the Latvian-Estonian Basketball League.

== Estonian national team ==
Veideman was a member of the Estonian national under-18 basketball team that competed at the 2008 FIBA Europe Under-18 Championship and finished the tournament last, in 16th place.

As a member of the senior Estonian national basketball team, Veideman competed at the EuroBasket 2015, averaging 10 points, 5.4 rebounds and 4 assists per game, in 32.6 minutes. Estonia finished the tournament in 20th place.

Veideman was named captain of the national team for the EuroBasket 2017 qualifiers.

== Awards and accomplishments ==
=== Professional career ===
TÜ/Rock

- 2× Estonian Cup champion: 2010, 2011
- BBL Cup champion: 2010

Kalev/Cramo

- 2× Estonian League champion: 2014, 2016
- 2× Estonian Cup champion: 2015, 2016

=== Individual ===
- 2× All-KML Team: 2010, 2014
- KML Best Young Player Award: 2010, 2011
- 2× VTB United League Top Estonian Player: 2014, 2015
- KML All-Star: 2017
- KML All-Star MVP: 2017

== Career statistics ==
Legend
GP	Games played	GS	Games started	MPG	Minutes per game
FG%	Field-goal percentage	3P%	3-point field-goal percentage	FT%	Free-throw percentage
RPG	Rebounds per game	APG	Assists per game	SPG	Steals per game
BPG	Blocks per game	PPG	Points per game	PIR	Performance index rating
**Bold**	Career high

=== Domestic leagues ===
Season	Team	League	GP	MPG	FG%	3P%	FT%	RPG	APG	SPG	BPG	PPG
2008–09	Kuremaa	KML	16	25.3	.424	.346	.641	4.4	1.9	1.6	.6	10.9
2009–10	Rakvere Tarvas	KML	32	33.7	.425	.297	.762	3.8	1.9	1.8	.1	15.1
2010–11	TÜ/Rock	KML	35	25.6	.430	.328	.797	3.3	2.2	1.8	.2	11.6
2011–12	TÜ/Rock	KML	16	31.0	.503	.380	.773	3.7	2.8	2.1	.1	15.6
2011–12	Bayreuth	BBL	14	24.2	.415	.359	.657	2.4	1.9	.9	.2	7.5
2012–13	TÜ/Rock	KML	20	24.3	.466	.365	.894	2.7	1.7	1.3	.2	10.2
2013–14	Kalev/Cramo	KML	34	24.8	.427	.345	.771	2.5	2.2	1.1	.4	9.2
2014–15	Kalev/Cramo	KML	20	25.7	.419	.320	.879	3.5	2.5	.8	.1	11.8
2015–16	Kalev/Cramo	KML	28	23.1	.482	.346	.794	3.7	2.2	1.0	.1	13.1
2016–17	Kalev/Cramo	KML	17	23.9	.428	.280	.830	3.1	3.2	.9	.1	11.5
2016–17	G.S.A. Udine	Serie A2	7	32.1	.361	.294	.951	4.7	3.7	.6	.3	17.0
2017–18	G.S.A. Udine	Serie A2	27	30.7	.384	.324	.833	3.7	3.2	.9	.1	12.8
2018–19	Avis Utilitas Rapla	LEBL	11	33.4	.489	.255	.830	4.7	4.1	1.8	.4	17.8
2018–19	Pompea Mantovana	Serie A2	25	33.1	.397	.286	.826	2.9	3.3	1.3	.0	14.8
2019–20	RSK Tarvas	LEBL	11	36.2	.480	.341	.887	3.4	4.3	1.4	.0	18.5
2019–20	Eurobasket Roma	Serie A2	12	30.1	.426	.280	.738	2.7	2.3	.5	.1	13.6

=== Estonia national team ===
Year	Tournament	National Team	GP	GS	MPG	FG%	3P%	FT%	RPG	APG	SPG	BPG	PPG
2007	2007 U-16 European Championship Division B	Estonia U-16	7	6	22.9	.429	.273	.760	3.1	1.3	2.0	.1	12.6
2008	2008 U-18 European Championship	Estonia U-18	6	4	26.2	.426	.273	.844	3.8	1.2	2.0	.3	13.2
2009	2009 U-18 European Championship Division B	Estonia U-18	8	7	31.4	.536	.325	.857	3.0	2.3	2.1	.0	18.9
2010–11	EuroBasket 2011 Division B	Estonia	6	1	22.5	.431	.455	.889	1.3	1.7	.8	.2	11.3
2011	2011 U-20 European Championship Division B	Estonia U-20	9	9	32.0	.523	.342	.789	4.0	3.6	3.0	.1	17.2
2012	EuroBasket 2013 Qualification	Estonia	1	0	4.0	.000	.000	.000	.0	1.0	.0	.0	.0
2013	EuroBasket 2015 First Qualification Round	Estonia	7	0	22.7	.561	.500	.455	1.9	1.3	.6	.3	11.4
2015	EuroBasket 2015	Estonia	5	4	32.6	.381	.333	.923	5.4	4.0	.4	.0	10.0
2016	EuroBasket 2017 Qualification	Estonia	6	6	32.0	.451	.308	.852	3.8	4.3	1.5	.2	15.8
2017	2019 Basketball World Cup Pre-Qualifiers	Estonia	4	2	32.2	.431	.273	.688	2.5	2.8	1.3	.3	15.3
2017–19	2019 Basketball World Cup Qualification	Estonia	8	3	26.0	.297	.167	.650	2.8	3.6	1.0	.0	6.9
