= Tarmo Kikerpill =

Estonian basketball player

Personal information
- Born: June 13, 1977 (age 49); Elva, Estonia
- Listed height: 6 ft 5 in (1.96 m)
- Listed weight: 220 lb (100 kg)

Career information
- Playing career: 1994–2010
- Position: Small forward
- Number: 9

Career history
- 1994–2005: Tartu Ülikool/Rock
- 2005–2006: Czarni Słupsk
- 2006–2007: Tartu Ülikool/Rock
- 2007–2008: Czarni Słupsk
- 2008–2009: AEK Athens
- 2009–2010: Valga/CKE Inkasso

Career highlights
- 4×Estonian Champion (2000–2001, 2004, 2007); 4×Estonian Cup Winner (2000–2002, 2004); 3×All-KML First Team (2001, 2004, 2007)

Career statistics
- Points: ?
- Rebounds: ?
- Assists: ?

Tarmo Kikerpill (born June 13, 1977) is a retired Estonian professional basketball player. He is 1.96 m (6 ft 5 in) in height and he played at the small forward or power forward position.

== Pro career ==
Kikerpill started his professional basketball career in 1994 with Tartu Ülikool/Rock in the Estonian League. He won four Estonian League Championships with the team. In 2005, he moved abroad for the first time, joining the Polish League club Energy Czarn Slupsk. After a brief return to Tartu Ülikool/Rock for the 2006–2007 season, Kikerpill re-joined Energy Czarn Slupsk, where he spent the 2007–2008 season. In the summer of 2008, Kikerpill started playing with the famous Greek League club AEK Athens BC. After playing a year there, Kikerpill returned to Estonia to play for Valga/CKE Inkasso. In August 2010, Kikerpill announced his retirement from professional basketball.

== Estonian national team ==
Kikerpill was also a member of the Estonian national basketball team.

=== Honours ===
==== Tartu Ülikool/Rock ====
- 4-time Estonian Champion: (2000, 2001, 2004, 2007)
- 4-time Estonian Cup Winner: (2000, 2001, 2002, 2004)
