= Janar Talts =

Estonian basketball player (born 1983)

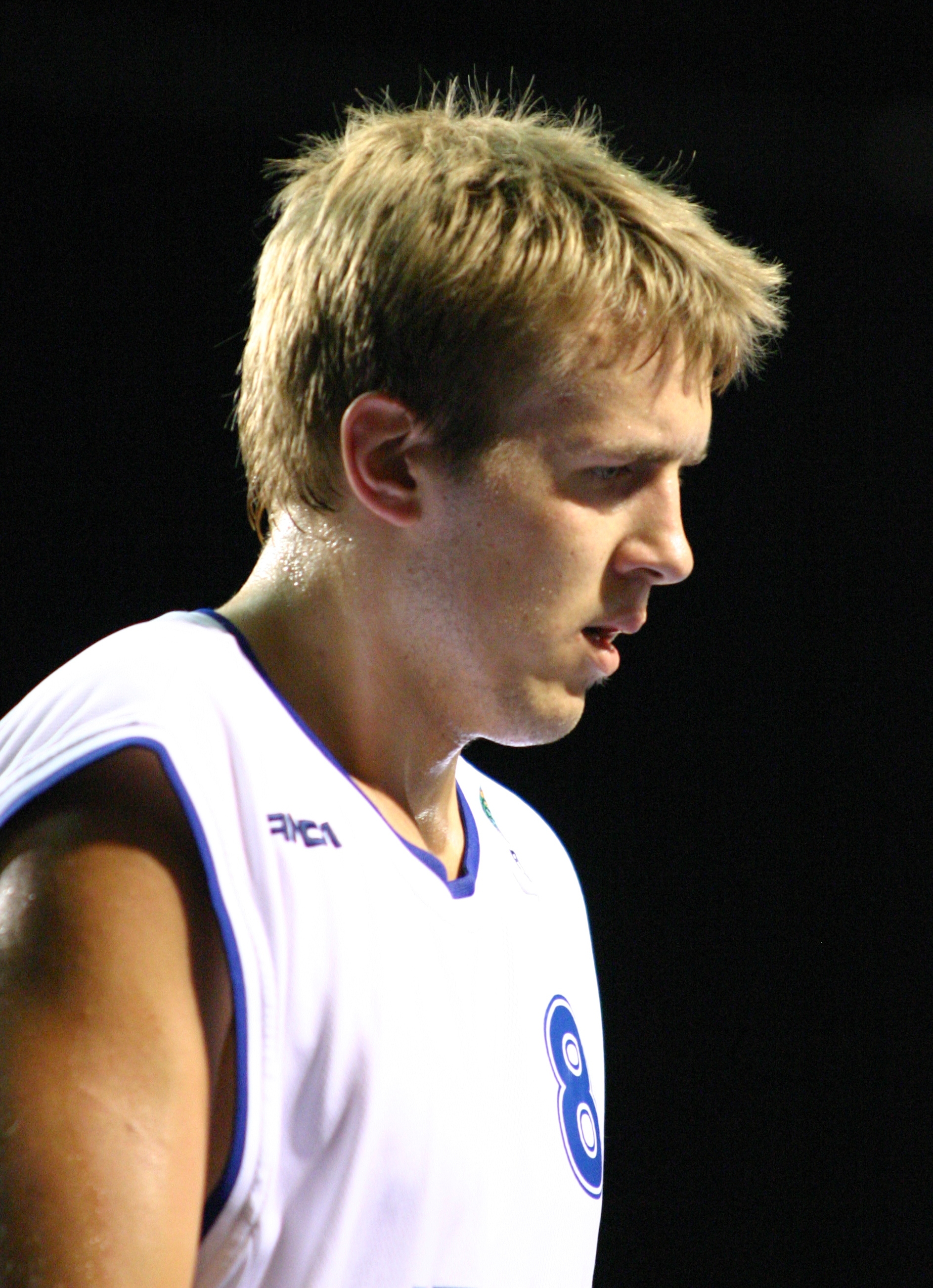
- Talts in 2006

University of Tartu
- Position: Sporting director
- League: Latvian–Estonian Basketball League

Personal information
- Born: 7 April 1983 (age 43) Tallinn, then part of Estonian SSR, Soviet Union
- Listed height: 2.07 m (6 ft 9 in)
- Listed weight: 102 kg (225 lb)

Career information
- NBA draft: 2005: undrafted
- Playing career: 2001–2019

Career history
- 2001–2002: TTÜ-A. Le Coq
- 2002–2004: Tallinna Kalev
- 2004–2007: RheinEnergie Köln
- 2007–2010: University of Tartu
- 2011: Krasnye Krylya Samara
- 2011–2013: Cimberio Varese
- 2013–2018: University of Tartu
- 2018–2019: Tallinna Kalev/TLÜ

Career highlights
- 4× Estonian League champion (2003, 2008, 2010, 2015); German League champion (2006); 4× Estonian Cup winner (2009, 2010, 2013, 2014); 2× German Cup winner (2005, 2007); German Super Cup winner (2006); Baltic Basketball League Cup winner (2010); Estonian League Finals MVP (2010); Estonian Cup MVP (2014); 2× Estonian League Best Defender (2015, 2016); 6× Estonian League First Team (2008–2010, 2014, 2015, 2018); 2× Estonian League All-Star (2002, 2018)

Janar Talts (born 7 April 1983) is a former Estonian professional basketball player who is the sporting director of University of Tartu basketball team. Standing at 2.07 m (6 ft 9 in), he played at the power forward and center positions. He represented the Estonian national basketball team internationally.

== Professional career ==
Talts began his professional career in 2001 with TTÜ-A. Le Coq of the Korvpalli Meistriliiga.

In 2002, Talts signed for the Estonian champions Tallinna Kalev. With Tallinna Kalev, he won his first Estonian Championship in the 2002–03 season, after Tallinna Kalev defeated TTÜ/A. Le Coq 4 games to 2 in the KML Finals.

In 2004, Talts joined RheinEnergie Köln of the Basketball Bundesliga, where he signed for the next three seasons. RheinEnergie Köln won the German Championship in the 2005–06 season, after defeating Alba Berlin 3 games to 1 in the Finals. RheinEnergie Köln competed in the 2006–07 Euroleague season, but failed to advance past the group stage with a 2–12 record. Talts averaged 2.9 points and 3.2 rebounds per game.

In 2007, Talts returned to Estonia and signed for TÜ/Rock. TÜ/Rock reached Final Four in the 2007–08 FIBA EuroCup season, but were defeated in the semifinals by Barons LMT 82–88 and in the third place game by AEL Limassol 70–79. Talts won his second Estonian Championship in the 2007–08 season, after TÜ/Rock swept Kalev/Cramo in the KML Finals and was named to the All-KML Team. After finishing the 2008–09 season as runners-up, TÜ/Rock won the 2009–10 Estonian League championship, defeating Kalev/Cramo in the Finals. Talts was named Finals Most Valuable Player and was also named to the All-KML Team.

On 30 December 2010, Talts left TÜ/Rock to join Krasnye Krylya Samara of the Russian Professional Basketball League. Talts left Krasnye Krylya Samara after only three months and joined Cimberio Varese of the Serie A.

On 15 August 2013, returned to TÜ/Rock. TÜ/Rock finished the 2013–14 season as runners-up. Talts averaged 10.81 points and 6.39 rebounds during the season and was named to the All-KML Team. He won his fourth Estonian Championship in the 2014–15 season, after TÜ/Rock defeated Kalev/Cramo in the KML Finals, winning the series 4 games to 1. Talts won the Best Defender Award and was named to the All-KML Team. TÜ/Rock failed to defend the title in the 2015–16 season, losing to Kalev/Cramo in the KML Finals, but Talts was once again named Best Defender.

== Estonian national team ==
As a member of the senior Estonian national basketball team, Talts competed at the EuroBasket 2015, averaging 10.4 points, 0.4 assists, and 4 rebounds in 22.2 minutes per game. Estonia finished the tournament in 20th place.

== Career statistics ==
Legend
GP	Games played	GS	Games started	MPG	Minutes per game
FG%	Field-goal percentage	3P%	3-point field-goal percentage	FT%	Free-throw percentage
RPG	Rebounds per game	APG	Assists per game	SPG	Steals per game
BPG	Blocks per game	PPG	Points per game	PIR	Performance index rating
**Bold**	Career high

=== Euroleague ===
Year	Team	GP	GS	MPG	FG%	3P%	FT%	RPG	APG	SPG	BPG	PPG	PIR
2006–07	RheinEnergie	13	11	16.3	.283	.172	.636	3.2	.5	.3	.6	2.9	1.2
Career		13	11	16.3	.283	.172	.636	3.2	.5	.3	.6	2.9	1.2

== Awards and accomplishments ==
=== Professional career ===
Tallinna Kalev

- Estonian League champion: 2003

RheinEnergie Köln

- German League champion: 2006
- 2× German Cup champion: 2005, 2007
- German Super Cup champion: 2006

TÜ/Rock

- 3× Estonian League champion: 2008, 2010, 2015
- 4× Estonian Cup champion: 2009, 2010, 2013, 2014
- BBL Cup champion: 2010

=== Individual ===
- KML Finals Most Valuable Player: 2010
- 2× KML Best Defender: 2015, 2016
- 6× All-KML Team: 2008, 2009, 2010, 2014, 2015, 2018
- 2× KML All-Star: 2002, 2018
