= Martin Jurtom =

Estonian former basketball player

Personal information
- Born: 11 March 1994 (age 32) Tallinn, Estonia
- Listed height: 2.00 m (6 ft 7 in)
- Listed weight: 90 kg (198 lb)
- Position: Power forward, small forward

Career history
- 2010–2013: Audentes
- 2011–2012: Tallinna Kalev
- 2012–2014: Rapla
- 2013–2014: → New Basket Brindisi
- 2014–2015: Rakvere Tarvas
- 2015: Junior Casale
- 2015–2018: Tallinna Kalev/TLÜ
- 2016–2017: → TLÜ/Kalev II
- 2018–2019: Valga
- 2019–2021: BC Tallinna Kalev
Medals
Men's 3x3 basketball
Representing Estonia
FIBA Under-18 World Cup Dunk Contest
Silver medal – second place	2012 Spain	Team

Martin Jurtom (born 11 March 1994) is a retired basketball player from Estonia. Standing at 2.00 m (6 ft 7 in), he played at the power forward and small forward positions.

Jurtom has also competed in 3x3 basketball and in 2020, created a basketball-themed board game, SofaHoop.
