= Rain Raadik =

Estonian basketball player

Valga
- Position: Power forward / center
- League: Korvpalli Meistriliiga; Latvijas Basketbola Līga

Personal information
- Born: 17 May 1989 (age 37) Pärnu, then part of Estonian SSR, Soviet Union
- Listed height: 2.08 m (6 ft 10 in)
- Listed weight: 110 kg (243 lb)

Career information
- NBA draft: 2011: undrafted
- Playing career: 2005–present

Career history
- 2005–2009: Audentes
- 2006–2007: Pärnu
- 2007–2008: Triobet
- 2008–2009: Kalev
- 2009: → Kalev II
- 2009–2010: Rakvere Tarvas
- 2010–2012: University of Tartu
- 2010–2012: → University of Tartu II
- 2012–2013: Pärnu
- 2013–2014: Rakvere Tarvas
- 2014: TTÜ
- 2014–2015: EDO Pointe-Noire
- 2015–2016: Pärnu
- 2016–2018: Valga
- 2020-present: Valentino Basket Castellaneta

Career highlights
- KML champion (2009)

Rain Raadik (born 17 May 1989) is an Estonian professional basketball player who plays for Valentino Basket Castellaneta of the Serie C Italian Basketball League. He is a 2.08 m (6 ft 10 in) tall power forward and center. He also represented the Estonian national basketball team internationally.

== Estonian national team ==
Raadik was a member of the junior Estonian national team that finished 12th in the 2007 FIBA Europe Under-18 Championship. He averaged 5.1 points and 4.3 rebounds per game.

== Awards and accomplishments ==
=== Professional career ===
Kalev

- Estonian League champion: 2009

University of Tartu

- 2× Estonian Cup champion: 2010, 2011
