= Tanel Kurbas =

Estonian basketball player (born 1988)

BC Kalev
- Position: Team manager / Assistant coach
- League: Korvpalli Meistriliiga; Latvian–Estonian Basketball League

Personal information
- Born: 8 May 1988 (age 38) Tallinn, then part of Estonian SSR, Soviet Union
- Listed height: 1.97 m (6 ft 6 in)
- Listed weight: 90 kg (198 lb)

Career information
- NBA draft: 2010: undrafted
- Playing career: 2005–2026

Career history
- 2005–2008: Audentes
- 2006–2008: Triobet/Dalkia
- 2008–2010: BC Kalev
- 2010–2016: Tartu Ülikool
- 2016–2017: Södertälje Kings
- 2017–2018: Patrioti Levice
- 2018: GTK Gliwice
- 2018–2026: BC Kalev

Career highlights
- 7× Estonian League champion (2009, 2015, 2019, 2021, 2023, 2024, 2025); 4× Estonian Cup winner (2008, 2020, 2024, 2025); Slovak League champion (2018); Estonian League Finals MVP (2015); Estonian League First Team (2014)
Medals
Men's basketball
Representing Estonia
FIBA Europe U-18 Championship Division B
Silver medal – second place	2006 Romania	U18 Team

Tanel Kurbas (born 8 May 1988) is a former Estonian professional basketball player who currently is team manager and assistant coach for BC Kalev of the Korvpalli Meistriliiga. Standing at 1.97 m (6 ft 6 in), he played at the shooting guard and small forward positions. He also represented the Estonian national basketball team internationally.

== Professional career ==
Kurbas began playing basketball with Tiit Sokk's basketball school. He made his Korvpalli Meistriliiga (KML) debut in the 2005–06 season with Noortekoondis/Audentes. In 2006, he joined Dalkia/Nybit.

In 2008, Kurbas signed for Kalev. He won his first Estonian Championship in the 2008–09 season. Kurbas averaged 8.3 points and 2.4 rebounds per game.

On 22 July 2010, Kurbas signed for Estonian champions Tartu Ülikool. In the 2013–14 season, Kurbas averaged 9 points, 2.2 rebounds and 1.6 assists per game and was named to the All-KML Team. He won his second Estonian Championship in the 2014–15 season, after TÜ/Rock defeated Kalev/Cramo in the finals, winning the series 4 games to 1. Kurbas was named KML Finals Most Valuable Player.

On 26 July 2016, Kurbas signed a one-year contract with Swedish champions Södertälje Kings.

== Estonian national team ==
As a member of the senior Estonian national basketball team, Kurbas competed at the EuroBasket 2015. During the tournament, he averaged 5.3 points, 2 rebounds, 1 assist in 19.3 minutes per game. Estonia finished the tournament in 20th place.

== Awards and accomplishments ==
=== Professional career ===
Kalev

- Estonian League champion: 2009, 2019
- Estonian Cup champion: 2008, 2020

University of Tartu

- Estonian League champion: 2015
- 4× Estonian Cup champion: 2010, 2011, 2013, 2014

Patrioti Levice

- Slovak League champion: 2018

=== Individual ===
- KML Finals Most Valuable Player: 2015
- All-KML Team: 2014
