= Sten Olmre =

Estonian basketball player

TTÜ
- Position: Shooting guard

Personal information
- Born: January 31, 1995 (age 31) Tallinn, Estonia
- Listed height: 6 ft 3 in (1.91 m)
- Listed weight: 183 lb (83 kg)

Career history
- 2010–2014: Audentes
- 2011–2012: Pärnu
- 2014–2016: Kalev
- 2016–2020: TalTech

Career highlights
- KML champion (2016); Estonian Cup winner (2015)

Sten Olmre (born 31 January 1995) is an Estonian former professional basketball player.
