= Martin Viiask =

Estonian basketball player

Personal information
- Born: 27 April 1983 (age 43) Tartu, then part of Estonian SSR, Soviet Union
- Listed height: 6 ft 9 in (2.06 m)
- Listed weight: 233 lb (106 kg)

Career information
- Playing career: 2000–2010
- Position: Power forward
- Number: 6

Career history
- 2000–2001: Ehitustööriist
- 2001–2007: Tartu Ülikool/Rock
- 2007–2008: BC Kalev
- 2008: Kuremaa
- 2008–2009: TTÜ
- 2009–2010: Tartu Ülikool/Rock

Martin Viiask (born 27 April 1983) is a former Estonian professional basketball player.

Viiask was born in Tartu. He started his senior club career in 2000 in Ehitustööriist. In the next year signed with Tartu Ülikool/Rock and played there until 2007, when he signed with Estonian rival Kalev/Cramo. He has also played for Kuremaa and TTÜ. His last season was with Tartu Ülikool/Rock on 2009–2010. He has also been a member of the Estonia national basketball team. He had a number of injuries during his career. As of 2023 he works as a real estate broker in Tartu.

== Honours ==
Tartu Ülikool/Rock

- Korvpalli Meistriliiga: 2003–04, 2006–07, 2009–10
- Estonian Basketball Cup: 2002, 2004, 2009

Kalev/Cramo

- Estonian Basketball Cup: 2007
