= Timo Eichfuss =

Estonian basketball player

Personal information
- Born: 19 November 1988 (age 37) Muhu, Estonia
- Listed height: 2.00 m (6 ft 7 in)
- Listed weight: 105 kg (231 lb)

Career information
- Playing career: 2004–2020
- Position: Power forward

Career history
- 2004–2006: Rakvere
- 2006–2008: Rakvere Tarvas
- 2008–2016: University of Tartu
- 2016–2017: Rakvere Tarvas
- 2017: BC Kalev
- 2017–2018: BC Pärnu Sadam
- 2018–2020: Valga
- 2020: University of Tartu

Career highlights
- 3× KML champion (2010, 2015, 2017)

Timo Eichfuss (born 19 November 1988) is a former Estonian professional basketball player. He is a 2.00 m (6 ft 7 in) tall power forward. He represented the Estonian national basketball team internationally.

== Club career ==
Timo Eichfuss started his basketball career in Rakvere Palliklubi and youth system and went on to make his debut in Korvpalli Meistriliiga at the age of 17 with the senior team. After three seasons with Rakvere Tarvas he signed with University of Tartu in 2008.

== Awards and accomplishments ==
=== Professional career ===
University of Tartu

- 2× Estonian League champion: 2010, 2015

Kalev/Cramo

- Estonian League champion: 2017
