= Silver Leppik =

Estonian basketball player

Personal information
- Born: 31 March 1983 (age 43) Siimusti, Estonia
- Listed height: 6 ft 1 in (1.85 m)
- Listed weight: 188 lb (85 kg)

Career information
- Playing career: 2001–2017
- Position: Shooting guard

Career history
- 2001–2002: Camofex
- 2002–2013: University of Tartu
- 2013–2014: Rakvere Tarvas
- 2014–2017: Pärnu

Silver Leppik (born 31 March 1983) is an Estonian retired professional basketball player. Standing at 1.85 m (6 ft 1 in), he played at the shooting guard position. He was a member of the Estonia national basketball team in 2005 and 2011.

== Awards and accomplishments ==
=== Professional career ===
University of Tartu

- 4× Estonian League champion: 2004, 2007, 2008, 2010
- 5× Estonian Cup champion: 2002, 2004, 2009, 2010, 2011
- BBL Cup champion: 2010
