= Brandis Raley-Ross =

American basketball player (born 1987)

No. 1 – Saigon Heat
- Position: Point guard
- League: VBA

Personal information
- Born: February 6, 1987 (age 39) Charlotte, North Carolina, U.S.
- Listed height: 6 ft 3 in (1.91 m)
- Listed weight: 200 lb (91 kg)

Career information
- High school: Gaston Day School (Gastonia, North Carolina)
- College: South Carolina (2006–2010)
- NBA draft: 2010: undrafted
- Playing career: 2011–present

Career history
- 2011: Iskra Svit
- 2011–2012: Tallinna Kalev
- 2012–2013: Rakvere Tarvas
- 2013–2014: Panelefsiniakos
- 2014–2015: Rakvere Tarvas
- 2015–2016: Kalev/Cramo
- 2016: Lietkabelis
- 2016: Rakvere Tarvas
- 2016: Erie BayHawks
- 2016–2017: Beroe
- 2017–2018: Mornar Bar
- 2018: Cibona
- 2018: Al Ittihad Tripoli
- 2019: Mornar Bar
- 2020: Eastern Long Lions
- 2020–2021: Tallinna Kalev
- 2021–2022: Eastern Long Lions
- 2023–2024: Tallinna Kalev
- 2024: Bima Perkasa Jogja
- 2024: Nalaikh Bison
- 2025: Prawira Bandung
- 2025–2026: Khovd Falcons
- 2026-present: Saigon Heat

Career highlights
- M league winner (2025); M league finals MVP (2025); All-IBL Second Team (2025); Montenegrin League champion (2018); 2× Estonian Cup winner (2012, 2015); Bulgarian Cup winner (2017); 2× All-KML First Team (2013, 2015)

Brandis Raley-Ross (born February 6, 1987) is an American professional basketball player for the Saigon Heat of the Vietnam Basketball Association (VBA). He played college basketball for the South Carolina Gamecocks. He is married to Ashley Raley-Ross, Head Women's Basketball Coach at Florida Tech.

== Professional career ==
On October 30, 2016, Raley-Ross was selected by the Erie BayHawks with the 98th pick of the 2016 NBA Development League draft. On December 8, he was waived by the BayHawks. In eight games, he averaged 4.1 points, 2.0 rebounds and 1.1 assists in 19.3 minutes.

In July 2017, he signed for Mornar Bar. In July 2018, he signed for Cibona. Cibona parted ways with him on December 24, 2018.

In February 2024, Raley-Ross joined the Bima Perkasa Jogja of the Indonesian Basketball League (IBL) to replace Martyce Kimbrough.

=== Nalaikh Bison (2024) ===
In Octoberthe 2024, Raley-Ross joined the Nalaikh Bison of The League..

=== Khovd Falcons (2025) ===
During the 2024-2025 season he left the team and joined Khovd Falcons of M League and won the championships and became the finals MVP. He also win in  The League play-in games and had chance to play in 2025-2026 season. He joined Khovd Falcons next season and left on march. He Raley-Ross averaged 22.2 points,3.7 rebounds, 3.7 assists, 1.4 steals.

In December 2024, he left the team. In March 2025, Raley-Ross joined the Prawira Bandung of the Indonesian Basketball League, replacing John Murry. On 28th June 2025, in a playoff match against Satria Muda Pertamina, Raley-Ross dropped 40 points, 7 rebounds, and 4 assists in their 78-72 win, bringing Satria Muda to a game three.
