= Andres Sõber =

Estonian basketball player & coach (born 1956)

Keila KK
- Title: Head coach

Personal information
- Born: 25 April 1956 (age 70) Harku, Estonia
- Listed height: 182 cm (6 ft 0 in)

Career information
- Playing career: 1976–1983
- Position: Point guard
- Coaching career: 1990–present

Career history

Playing
- 1976–1983: Kalev

Coaching
- 1990–1996: Lappeenrannan NMKY
- 1996–2000: Helsinki Torpan Pojat
- 2000–2002: TTÜ/A. Le Coq
- 2002–2005: Kalev
- 2006–2017: Rakvere Tarvas
- 2012–2016: Estonia (assistant)
- 2024–present: Keila KK
Medals
Men's basketball
Head coach for Estonia
FIBA Europe U-20 Championship Division B
Silver medal – second place	2011 Bosnia and Herzegovina	U20 Team

Andres Sõber (born 25 April 1956) is an Estonian basketball coach and former professional player.

== Career ==
=== Youth coach ===
Sõber has been noted as one of the most successful youth coaches in Estonia. After retiring from professional basketball, he held basketball trainings for boys in Mustamäe district of Tallinn. With the team, which was frequently represented as Estonian SSR youth team, they won everything possible in their country, but also achieved valuable results over the Soviet Union. During the time, he was the first coach of the only Estonian to play in the NBA, Martin Müürsepp.

=== Finland and Estonia ===
After eight years of working with youngsters, Sõber spent 2 years making a living at the Tallinn Pedagogical Institute. He then moved to Finland, where he first served as a youth coach again, but soon became to conduct several Korisliiga teams. Eventually Sõber came back to Estonia, having been in Finland for 10 years, to coach TTÜ/A. Le Coq. With the Tallinn University of Technology based team he did not achieve anything remarkable for two seasons and he moved to Estonian powerhouse Kalev, with whom they became Estonian champions.

=== Rakvere Tarvas ===
In 2005, Kalev and another minor Estonian team, Rakvere announced their bankruptcy and Andres Sõber was looking for new challenges. He considered coaching youth again, but then decided to establish new brand in Estonian basketball, Rakvere Tarvas. Despite financial problems and struggling to reach play-offs in the domestic league, they managed to get decent results and put bigger teams under pressure. The most important idea of the team was the symbiosis of the best local players, young players and some support from abroad.

The breakthrough season was 2009–10, when Andres Sõber managed to form a team, which consisted of experienced players, such as former Dutch champion Valmo Kriisa, NBA player Martin Müürsepp, young prospect Rain Veideman, member of the Canada men's national basketball team Richard Elias Anderson and basketballers ranked out of stronger squads (TÜ/Rock, BC Kalev/Cramo), Kristo Saage, Rain Raadik and Sven Kaldre for instance. They reached the finals, where they lost the series 4–2 to TÜ/Rock, despite leading 2-0 after two away games. The following year most of the team changed, as key players earned better contracts to bigger clubs.

== National team ==
Sõber played for Estonian Soviet Socialist Republic during his stint with Kalev Tallinn in 1976–83. He has been the head coach of Estonia U20 team since 2011, leading the team to win B Division and earn promotion to 2012. In 2012, head coach of the Estonia national basketball team, Tiit Sokk, included Andres Sõber to the national team to become the assistant coach for the EuroBasket 2013 qualifying round.

== Personal ==
Sõber is a father-in-law to former NFL football player Dave Ragone. He is also Estonian singer Anne Veski's high-school classmate.
