= Toomas Liivak =

Estonian basketball player

Personal information
- Born: 10 September 1970 (age 56) Tartu, then part of Estonian SSR, Soviet Union
- Listed height: 1.86 m (6 ft 1 in)

Career information
- Playing career: 1990–2009
- Position: Shooting guard

Career history
- 1990–1991: Tartu Maja
- 1991–1992: Taba 89
- 1992–2003: University of Tartu
- 2003–2004: Nybit
- 2004–2005: Rakvere
- 2005–2007: Valga
- 2007–2009: → Valga II

Career highlights
- 2× KML champion (2000–2001); All-KML Team (2001)

Toomas Liivak (born 10 September 1970) is an Estonian retired professional basketball player. Liivak represented the Estonian national basketball team internationally.

== Estonian national team ==
As a member of the Estonian national team, Liivak competed at the EuroBasket 2001, averaging 1 point, 0.7 rebounds and 0.7 assists in 5 minutes per game. Estonia finished the tournament in 14th place.
