= Vallo Allingu =

Estonian basketball player

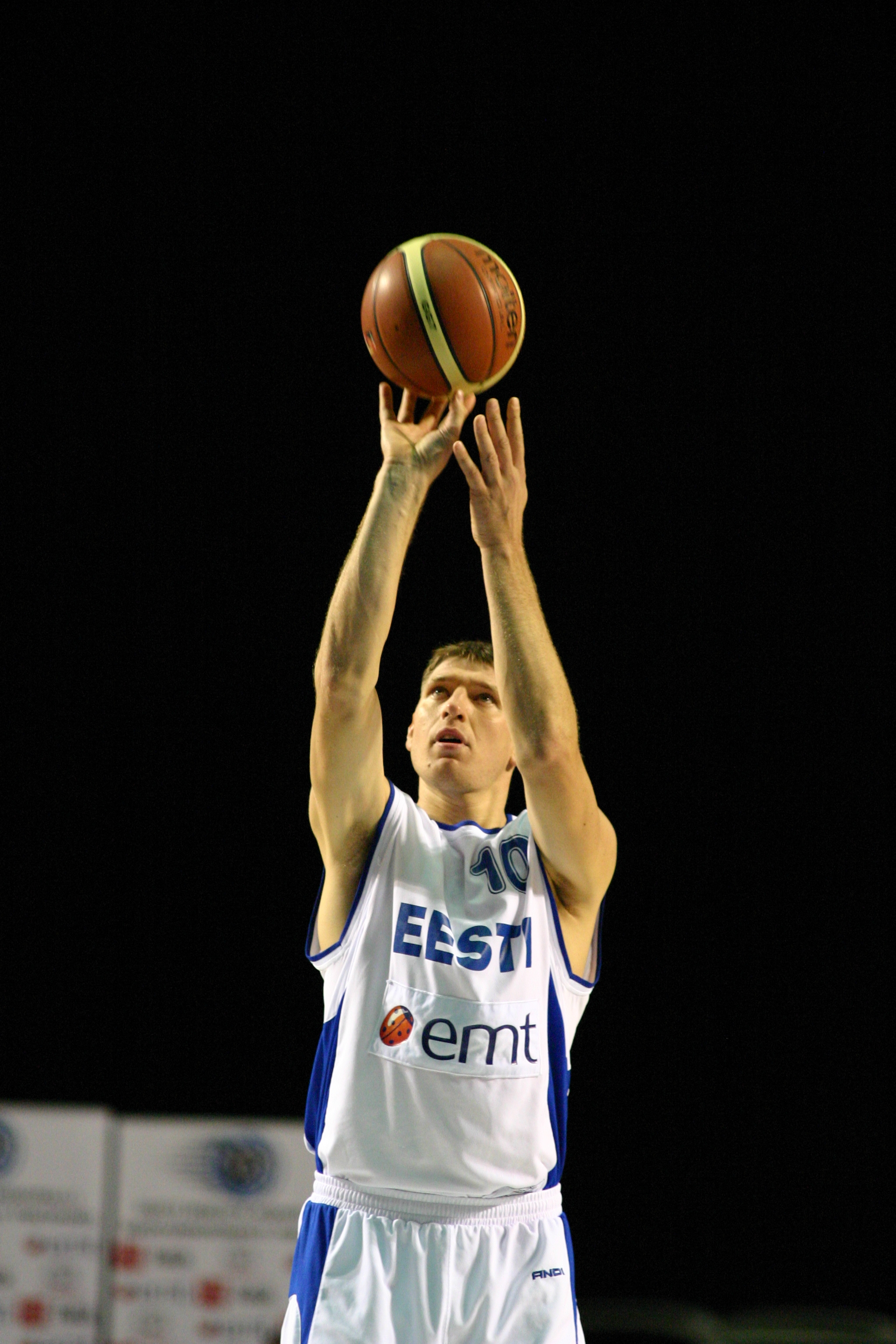

Personal information
- Born: 11 January 1978 (age 48) Jõgeva, then part of Estonian SSR, Soviet Union
- Listed height: 6 ft 9 in (2.06 m)
- Listed weight: 240 lb (109 kg)

Career information
- Playing career: 1998–2013
- Position: Center
- Number: 10

Career history
- 1998–1999: Puuviljaparadiis
- 2000–2002: KK Rakvere
- 2002–2013: Tartu Ülikool/Rock

Career highlights
- Estonian Cup MVP (2011)

Vallo Allingu (born 11 January 1978 in Jõgeva) is a retired Estonian professional basketballer who last played for Tartu Ülikool/Rock at the center position. Allingu started his senior club career with Korvpalli Meistriliiga teams like "Puuviljaparadiis" and KK Rakvere. In 2002 he joined with Tartu Ülikool/Rock and won the Estonian Championship titles in 2004, 2007, 2008 and 2010. Vallo Allingu was a member of the Estonia national basketball team. He made his national team debut in 2001 against Latvia national basketball team.

== Honours ==
- 2003–04 Estonian League (Tartu Ülikool/Rock)
- 2004–05 Estonian Cup (Tartu Ülikool/Rock)
- 2006–07 Estonian League (Tartu Ülikool/Rock)
- 2007–08 Estonian League (Tartu Ülikool/Rock)
- 2009–10 Estonian Cup (Tartu Ülikool/Rock)
- 2009–10 Estonian League (Tartu Ülikool/Rock)
- 2010–11 BBL Cup (Tartu Ülikool/Rock)
- 2010–11 Estonian Cup (Tartu Ülikool/Rock)
- 2011–12 Estonian Cup (Tartu Ülikool)
