= Kuressaare Sports Center =

Sports venue in Kuressaare, Estonia

- Kuressaare Spordikeskus
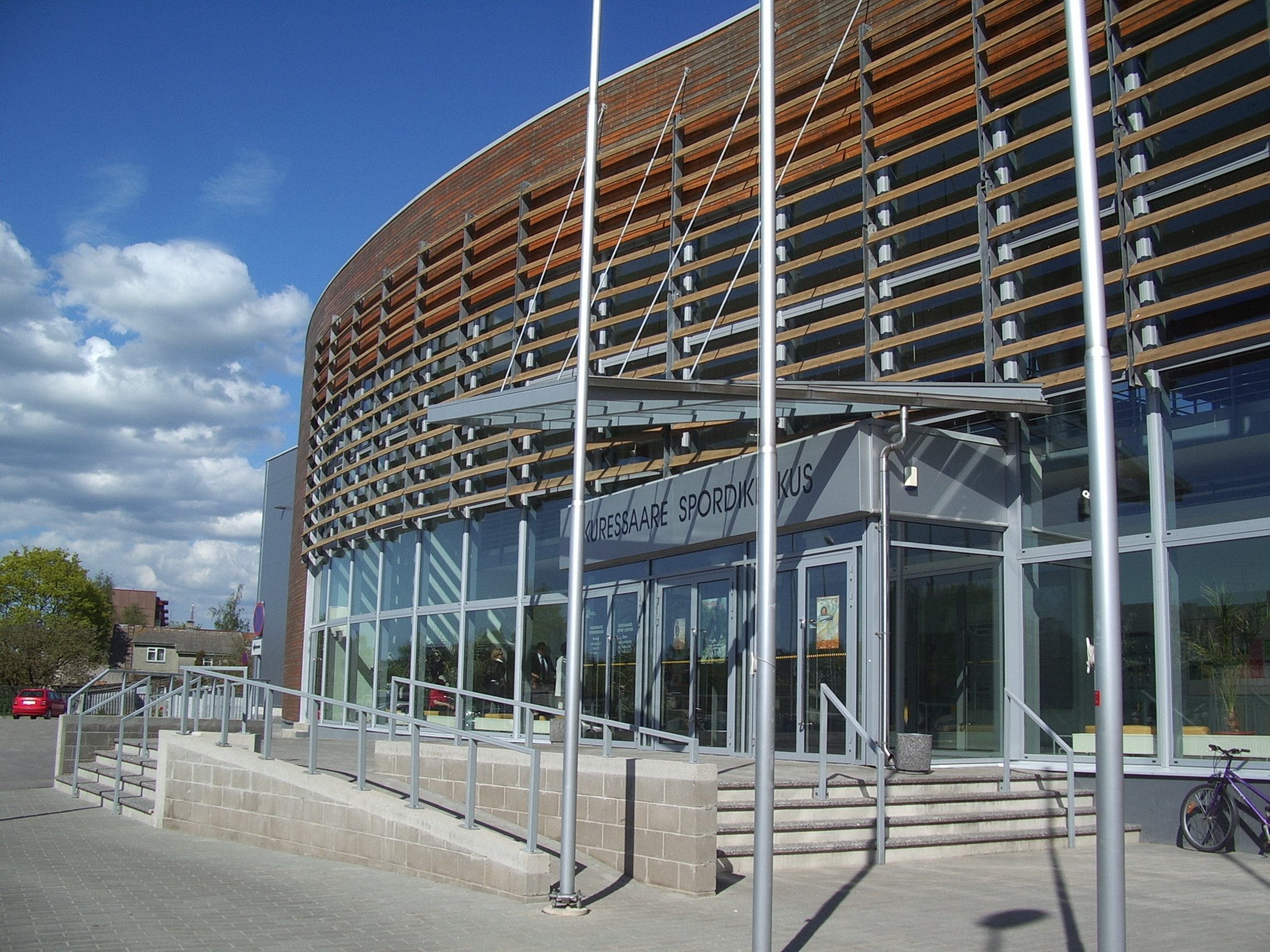
- Kuressaare Sports Centre in 2007
- Interactive map of Kuressaare Sports Center
- Address: Vallimaa 16a, Kuressaare, 93819 Saare maakond, Estonia
- Location: Kuressaare, Estonia
- Coordinates: 58°15′31″N 22°29′10″E

Construction
- Opened: 2004

Website
- www.kuressaarespordikeskus.ee

Kuressaare Sports Center (Estonian: Kuressaare Spordikeskus) is a sport hall in Kuressaare, Saare County, Estonia. The centre was opened in 2004 and is managed by Saaremaa Spordikool.

The centre is the home arena for the volleyball club Saaremaa VK.
