= Aivar Kuusmaa =

Estonian basketball player and coach

Tartu Ülikool
- Title: Head coach
- League: Korvpalli Meistriliiga; Estonian-Latvian Basketball League

Personal information
- Born: 12 June 1967 (age 59) Tallinn, then part of Estonian SSR, Soviet Union
- Listed height: 186 cm (6 ft 1 in)
- Listed weight: 209 lb (95 kg)

Career information
- Playing career: 1983–2005
- Position: Shooting guard
- Number: 5
- Coaching career: 2005–present

Career history

Playing
- 1983–1984: TSIK
- 1985–1986: Standard
- 1986–1987: Rīgas ASK
- 1988–1989: Kalev
- 1989–1990: Youngstown Pride
- 1990–1993: Kalev
- 1993–1996: Panathinaikos
- 1996–1998: Baltika
- 1998–1999: Tallinn
- 1999–2000: Kalev
- 2000–2001: Liege Basket
- 2001–2004: TTÜ-A. Le Coq
- 2004–2005: BC Kalev

Coaching
- 2005–2006: BC Kalev
- 2006–2007: BC Kalev (assistant)
- 2007–2008: Estonia U-20
- 2007–2010: TTÜ KK
- 2010–2012: BC Kalev
- 2014–2018: Rapla KK
- 2018–2019: Estonia U-20
- 2020–2024: Audentes/Noortekoondis
- 2024–present: Tartu Ülikool

Career highlights
- As player: 2× KML Most Valuable Player (1999, 2003); 4× Estonian League champion (1992, 1993, 1999, 2000); 2× Estonian Cup winner (1999, 2003); 3× Estonian SSR League champion (1986, 1988, 1989); Latvian SSR League champion (1987); World Basketball League (1990); USSR League champion (1991); Greek Cup winner (1996); 4× KML All-Star Five (1999, 2000, 2002, 2003); As head coach: 4× Estonian League champion (2006, 2011, 2012, 2026); 3× Estonian Cup winner (2005, 2006, 2026); 4× KML Coach of the Year (2006, 2011, 2012, 2017)
Medals
Men's basketball
Representing Soviet Union
FIBA Europe U-18 Championship
Silver medal – second place	1986 Austria	U18 Team

Aivar Kuusmaa (born 12 June 1967) is an Estonian basketball coach and former professional basketball player who currently serves as head coach for Tartu Ülikool of the Latvian-Estonian Basketball League. He played mostly at the shooting guard position.

He won the USSR Premier Basketball League in 1991 as a member of the Tallinn Kalev basketball team. Kuusmaa mostly played in Estonia, but he also spent three seasons in Greece, with Panathinaikos and one season in Belgium, with Liege Basket. Also, during the service in the Soviet Army, Kuusmaa was stationed in Latvian SSR and played in the local army sports club Rīgas ASK. After retiring in 2005 he has been coaching BC Kalev/Cramo (2005–2007 & 2010–2012), TTÜ KK (2007–2010) and AVIS Utilitas Rapla (2014–2018). Kuusmaa has also greek citizenship under the surname Magoulas. Elected to the Hall of fame of Estonian basketball in 2020.

== Achievements ==
As a player

- 1985–86 Estonian SSR Championship (Standard)
- 1986–87 Latvian SSR Championship (Rīgas ASK)
- 1987–88 Estonian SSR Championship (Standard)
- 1988–89 Estonian SSR Championship (Tallinna Kalev)
- 1989–90 World Basketball League Championship (Youngstown Pride)
- 1990–91 Soviet Union Championship (Tallinna Kalev)
- 1991–92 Estonian League Championship (Tallinna Kalev)
- 1992–93 Estonian League Championship (Tallinna Kalev)
- 1995–96 Greek Basketball Cup (Panathinaikos)
- 1998–99 Estonian Basketball Cup (Tallinn)
- 1998–99 Estonian League Championship (Tallinn)
- 1999–00 Estonian League Championship (Tallinna Kalev)
- 2003–04 Estonian Basketball Cup (TTÜ/A.Le Coq)

As a coach

- 2005–06 Estonian Basketball Cup (Kalev/Cramo)
- 2005–06 Estonian League Championship (Kalev/Cramo)
- 2006–07 Estonian Basketball Cup (Kalev/Cramo)
- 2010–11 Estonian League Championship (Kalev/Cramo)
- 2011–12 Estonian League Championship (Kalev/Cramo)

== Season by season results as head coach ==
Abbreviations:
QF; quarter-finals.
T16; top sixteen.
R1; first round.
DNP; did not participate.

League	Club	Season	Domestic Competitions		Baltic Basketball League		VTB United League	European Competitions	
League	Club	Season	Championship	Cup	Competition	Position	VTB United League	Competition	Position
Korvpalli Meistriliiga	Kalev/Cramo	2005–06	1st	1st	Baltic League	9th	DNP	3 EuroCup	GS
Korvpalli Meistriliiga	TTÜ	2007–08	10th	R1	DNP		DNP	DNP	
Korvpalli Meistriliiga	TTÜ	2008–09	3rd	2nd	Challenge Cup	QF	DNP	DNP	
Korvpalli Meistriliiga	TTÜ	2009–10	4th	3rd	Challenge Cup	4th	DNP	DNP	
Korvpalli Meistriliiga	Kalev/Cramo	2010–11	1st	3rd	Baltic League	9th	GS	DNP	
Korvpalli Meistriliiga	Kalev/Cramo	2011–12	1st	2nd	Baltic League	QF	GS	DNP	
Korvpalli Meistriliiga	AVIS Utilitas Rapla	2014–15	3rd	QF	Baltic League	T16	DNP	DNP	
Korvpalli Meistriliiga	AVIS Utilitas Rapla	2015–16	3rd	T16	Baltic League	T16	DNP	DNP	
Korvpalli Meistriliiga	AVIS Utilitas Rapla	2016–17	2nd	QF	Baltic League	T16	DNP	DNP	
Korvpalli Meistriliiga	AVIS Utilitas Rapla	2017–18	3rd	No competition	Baltic League	QF	DNP	DNP	
LEBL	AVIS Utilitas Rapla	2018–19	(resigned)	No competition	No competition		DNP	DNP	

== Books ==
- Lään, Vello; Ibrus, Märt (2006). Eesti korvpall portreed. Eesti Korvpalliliit. pp. 299–308. ISBN 9949-406-68-4.
