= Indrek Visnapuu =

Estonian basketball player and coach

Free agent
- Title: Head coach

Personal information
- Born: May 4, 1976 (age 50) Tartu, then part of Estonian SSR, Soviet Union

Career information
- Playing career: 1993–2003
- Position: Point guard
- Coaching career: 2002–present

Career history

Playing
- 1993–1994: Tartu
- 1997–2000: University of Tartu
- 2000–2002: Hotronic
- 2002–2003: TPÜ/Kiili
- 2003: TTÜ/A. Le Coq
- 2003–2004: TPÜ/Kiili
- 2004–2005: Ehitustööriist/TTÜ
- 2006–2007: TLÜ/Kiili

Coaching
- 2002–2004: TTÜ/A. Le Coq (assistant)
- 2005–2007: Estonia U-18
- 2005–2006: Estonia (assistant)
- 2007–2008: Tartu Ülikool/Rock (assistant)
- 2008: Estonia U-20
- 2008–2012: Tartu Ülikool/Rock
- 2012–2019: Audentes/Noortekoondis
- 2016: Estonia U-20
- 2017–2019: Estonia (assistant)
- 2018–2019: Estonia U-18

Career highlights
- As player: KML champion (2000); Estonian Cup champion (2000); As assistant coach: KML champion (2008); Estonian Cup champion (2003); As head coach: KML champion (2010); 3× Estonian Cup champion (2009–2011)

Indrek Visnapuu (born 4 May 1976) is an Estonian basketball coach and former player, who last coached Audentes/Noortekoondis of the Korvpalli Meistriliiga (KML).

== Playing career ==
Visnapuu made his Korvpalli Meistriliiga debut on 2 October 1993 with Tartu.

In 1997, Visnapuu joined Polaris (University of Tartu). He won his first Estonian Championship in the 1999–2000 season.

In 2000, he signed for Hotronic.

In 2003, Visnapuu signed for TTÜ/A. Le Coq.

== Coaching career ==
Visnapuu's coaching career began in 2002, when he became an assistant coach at TTÜ/A. Le Coq, while he was still an active 26-year-old player.

From 2005 to 2007, Visnapuu served as the head coach of the Estonian national under-18 basketball team and from 2005 to 2006, as the assistant coach of the Estonian men's national basketball team.

In 2007, Visnapuu became an assistant coach at his former team University of Tartu. On 20 December 2008, he replaced Üllar Kerde as the head coach. On 14 May 2010, Visnapuu won the Estonian Championship with Tartu, after defeating Rakvere Tarvas 4 games to 2 in the finals. On 24 January 2012, Visnapuu resigned from the team.

In September 2012, he became the head coach of Audentes/Noortekoondis.

== Awards and accomplishments ==
=== Playing achievements ===
University of Tartu

- Estonian League champion: 2000
- Estonian Cup champion: 2000

=== Coaching achievements ===
TTÜ/A. Le Coq

- Estonian Cup champion: 2003 (assistant coach)

University of Tartu

- Estonian League champion: 2008 (assistant coach), 2010
- Estonian Cup champion: 2009, 2010, 2011
- BBL Cup champion: 2010
