= Erik Keedus =

Estonian basketball player

TalTech Basketball
- Position: Shooting guard / small forward
- League: Korvpalli Meistriliiga

Personal information
- Born: 27 April 1990 (age 36) Tallinn, then part of Estonian SSR, Soviet Union
- Listed height: 1.98 m (6 ft 6 in)
- Listed weight: 96 kg (212 lb)

Career information
- College: TalTech University
- NBA draft: 2012: undrafted
- Playing career: 2007–present

Career history
- 2007–2014: TTÜ
- 2014–2019: Kalev/Cramo
- 2019–2020: Rapla
- 2020–: TalTech

Career highlights
- 4× Estonian League (2016–2019); 2× Estonian Cup (2015, 2016)

Erik Keedus (born 27 April 1990) is an Estonian professional basketball player for TalTech of the Estonian Korvpalli Meistriliiga. He is a 1.98 m (6 ft 6 in) tall shooting guard and small forward. Keedus represents the Estonian national basketball team internationally.

== Professional career ==
Keedus began playing basketball with Siili Palliklubi and TTÜ. He began his professional career in 2007 with TTÜ of the Estonian Korvpalli Meistriliiga. In 2013, Keedus helped TTÜ win the inaugural season of the International Students Basketball League.

On 9 September 2014, Keedus signed for the Estonian champions Kalev/Cramo. Kalev/Cramo finished the 2014–15 season as runners-up. Keedus won his first Estonian Championship in the 2015–16 season, after Kalev/Cramo defeated TÜ/Rock in the finals.

== Estonian national team ==
Keedus was a member of the Estonian national under-18 basketball team that competed at the 2008 FIBA Europe Under-18 Championship. The team finished the tournament last, in 16th place. Keedus averaged 5.3 points, 4 rebounds and 1.7 assists per game.

As a member of the senior Estonian national basketball team, Keedus competed at the EuroBasket 2015, averaging 4.5 points and 1.5 rebounds in 19 minutes per game. Estonia finished the tournament in 20th place.

== Awards and accomplishments ==
=== Professional career ===
TTÜ

- International Students Basketball League champion: 2013

Kalev/Cramo

- 4× Estonian League champion: 2016, 2017, 2018, 2019
- 2× Estonian Cup champion: 2015, 2016
