= Marek Doronin =

Estonian professional basketball player

Tartu Ülikool
- Title: Team manager
- League: Korvpalli Meistriliiga; Estonian-Latvian Basketball League

Personal information
- Born: 9 January 1983 (age 43) Tartu, Estonia
- Listed height: 6 ft 6.75 in (2.00 m)
- Listed weight: 212 lb (96 kg)

Career information
- Playing career: 1998–2016
- Position: Small forward

Marek Doronin (born 9 January 1983) is a former Estonian professional basketball player. He has played his whole career in Tartu Ülikool/Rock.

== Honours ==
- Won 7 Estonian Championships (2000, 2001, 2004, 2007, 2008, 2010, 2015)
- Won 9 Estonian Cups (2000, 2001, 2002, 2004, 2009, 2010, 2011, 2013, 2014)
- Won 1 BBL Cup (2010)
