= Rauno Nurger =

Estonian basketball player

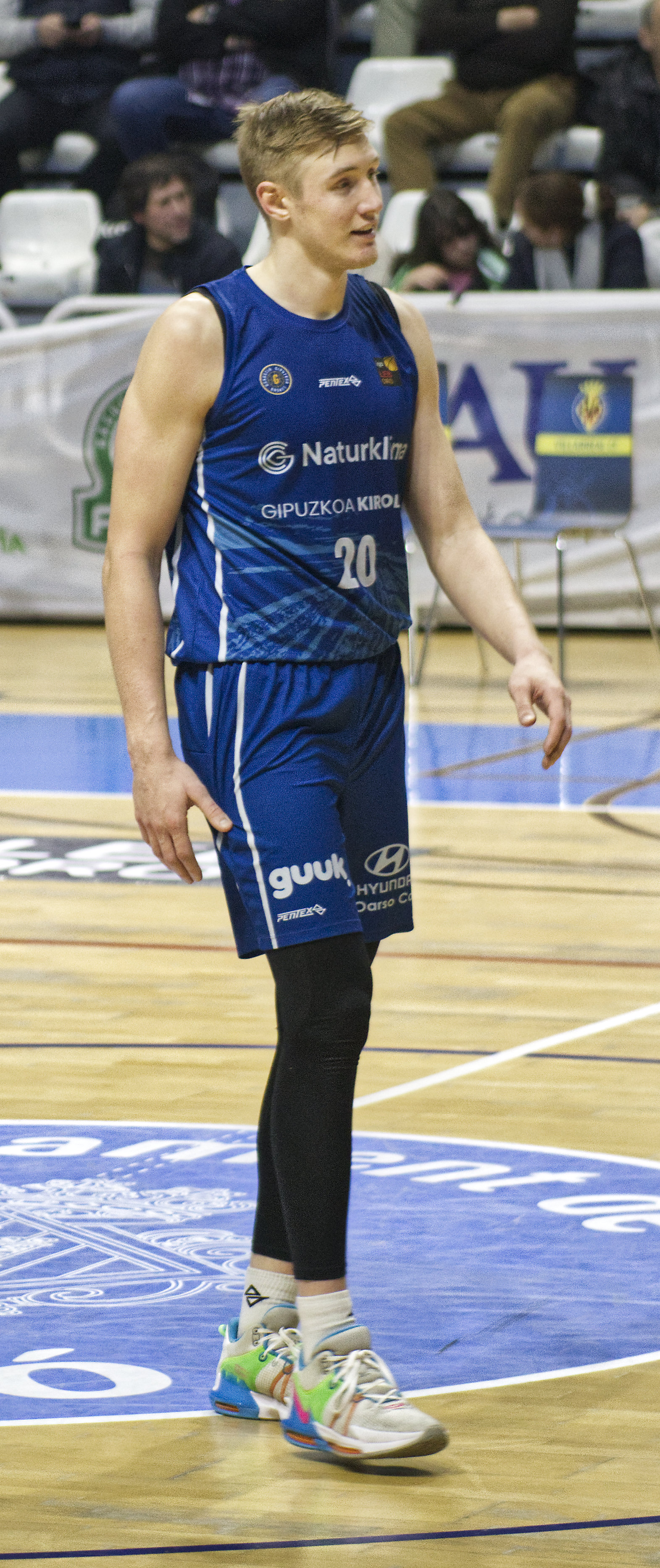
- Rauno Nurger (2023)

No. 20 – Tartu Ülikool
- Position: Power forward / center
- League: Korvpalli Meistriliiga; Latvian–Estonian Basketball League

Personal information
- Born: November 24, 1993 (age 32) Keila, Estonia
- Listed height: 2.08 m (6 ft 10 in)
- Listed weight: 105 kg (231 lb)

Career information
- High school: Sunrise Christian Academy (Bel Aire, Kansas)
- College: Wichita State (2014–2018)
- NBA draft: 2018: undrafted
- Playing career: 2011–present

Career history
- 2011–2012: Tallinna Kalev
- 2012–2013: Rapla
- 2018–2019: Peñas Huesca
- 2019–2020: Breogán
- 2020–2022: BC Kalev
- 2022–2023: Gipuzkoa Basket
- 2023–2024: BC Kalev
- 2024–present: Tartu Ülikool

Career highlights
- Estonian League champion (2024); MVC All-Bench Team (2017); 2× Estonian Cup winner (2020, 2024); Latvian–Estonian League champion (2021)

Rauno Nurger (born 24 November 1993) is an Estonian basketball player for Tartu Ülikool of the Korvpalli Meistriliiga. He is a 2.08 m (6 ft 10 in) tall power forward and center. Nurger played college basketball for the Wichita State Shockers.

== High school career ==
Nurger played for Sunrise Christian Academy in Bel Aire, Kansas. He averaged 10 points and 9 rebounds for the postgraduate team during 2013–14 season.

== College career ==
Nurger originally signed with Ole Miss but was released from his letter of intent following a coaching change. He then committed to Wichita State in the early summer of 2014. In his freshman year Nurger appeared in 24 games off the bench, averaging 2.3 points and 1.2 rebounds in 8.8 minutes. He scored four points in his collegiate debut against New Mexico State on November 11, 2014, and also played a season-high 20 minutes. Nurger scored a season-high 15 points on 5-of-9 shooting against Saint Louis on December 6, 2014. As a sophomore he had planned to redshirt the 2015–16 season while focusing on strength and skill development but was forced into duty after an injury to senior Anton Grady on November 27, 2015. He removed his redshirt in the season's sixth game on November 29, 2015, against Iowa. In his sophomore year Nurger appeared in 28 games off the bench, averaging 1.6 points and 1.2 rebounds in 7.6 minutes. In his junior year Nurger appeared in all 36 games with five starts as he averaged 5.0 points and 2.7 rebounds in 14.1 minutes. He was ranked third on the team with 15 blocks. Noted as an effective screener and three-point sniper (13-of-28) he was the first Shocker's player off the bench in 15 games and was chosen to the MVC All-Bench Team selection. Nurger helped Wichita State win the 2017 Missouri Valley Conference tournament as they defeated Illinois State 71–51 in the championship game. Nurger ended his college career as one of nine Shockers to participate in more than 100 career victories as Wichita State.

College recruiting
Name	Hometown	School	Height	Weight	Commit date
Rauno Nurger; PF	Keila, Estonia	Sunrise Christian Academy	6 ft 10 in (2.08 m)	230 lb (100 kg)	Jun 3, 2014
Rauno Nurger; PF	Recruit ratings: Scout: Rivals: (70)				

== Professional career ==
As a teenager, Nurger played two seasons in the Estonian League for Rapla and Tallinna Kalev teams. On August 16, 2018, he signed with Peñas Huesca of the LEB Oro. He stayed in Spain for the next season playing for Leche Río Breogán of the LEB Oro. In July 2020 he signed with Kalev/Cramo and returned to his native Estonia. In September 2022, he went back to play in LEB Oro, this time for Gipuzkoa Basket.

== National team career ==
Nurger made his debut for the Estonian national team on 29 June 2018, in a 2019 FIBA Basketball World Cup qualifier against Great Britain, scoring 8 points in a 65–74 away defeat.

== Career statistics ==
Legend
GP	Games played	GS	Games started	MPG	Minutes per game
FG%	Field-goal percentage	3P%	3-point field-goal percentage	FT%	Free-throw percentage
RPG	Rebounds per game	APG	Assists per game	SPG	Steals per game
BPG	Blocks per game	PPG	Points per game	PIR	Performance index rating
**Bold**	Career high

=== College ===
Year	Team	GP	GS	MPG	FG%	3P%	FT%	RPG	APG	SPG	BPG	PPG
2014–15	Wichita State	24	0	8.8	.474	.278	.700	1.2	.2	.1	**.4**	2.3
2015–16	Wichita State	28	0	7.6	.421	.083	.611	1.2	.1	.1	.3	1.6
2016–17	Wichita State	**36**	**5**	**14.1**	**.525**	**.464**	**.722**	**2.8**	**.6**	.1	**.4**	**5.0**
2017–18	Wichita State	33	2	13.4	.514	.296	.706	**2.8**	.5	**.2**	**.4**	4.4
Career		121	7	11.4	.502	.318	.698	2.1	.4	.1	.4	3.5

=== Domestic leagues ===
Season	Team	League	GP	MPG	FG%	3P%	FT%	RPG	APG	SPG	BPG	PPG
2011–12	Tallinna Kalev	KML	6	6.8	.250	.000	.750	1.7	.2	.2	.0	1.2
2011–12	Rapla	KML	11	12.6	.471	.000	.824	2.6	.3	.1	.2	4.2
2012–13	Rapla	KML	31	11.5	.462	.000	.596	2.8	.4	.3	.3	3.8
2018–19	Peñas Huesca	LEB Oro	33	26.1	.592	.154	.784	6.3	1.0	.5	.8	13.3
2019–20	Breogán	LEB Oro	24	19.6	.523	.111	.717	4.0	.5	.5	.5	7.2

=== Estonia national team ===
Year	Tournament	National Team	GP	GS	MPG	FG%	3P%	FT%	RPG	APG	SPG	BPG	PPG
2012	2012 FIBA Europe Under-20 Championship	Estonia U-20	9	8	28.0	.449	.000	.605	5.7	.8	.4	1.4	10.3
2013	2013 FIBA Europe Under-20 Championship	Estonia U-20	9	8	25.6	.535	.250	.467	5.4	.9	.3	1.8	10.2
2018–19	2019 Basketball World Cup Qualification	Estonia	6	2	15.3	.522	.250	.625	2.7	.0	.3	.3	5.0
2020	EuroBasket 2022 qualification	Estonia	2		10.1	.750	–	1.000	3.5	.0	.0	.0	4.0
