= Heino Lill =

Estonian basketball player and coach

Heino Lill (born 13 February 1944 in Tartu) is an Estonian basketball coach and former basketballer.

In 1963–197, he played for the Estonian national basketball team and for BC Tallinna Kalev. In 1978–1980, he was a coach of the Estonian national basketball team and also of BC Tallinna Kalev. In 1990–2001, he was a coach of two Finnish teams, Kuopio and Karkkila.

Since 2001, he has been the head of TTÜ Sport Centre.

In 2014, he was awarded with the Order of the White Star, V class.
