= Kristo Saage =

Estonian basketball player

No. 1 – Tere Kadrina Karud
- Position: Point guard
- League: Saku I Liiga

Personal information
- Born: 2 February 1985 (age 41) Rakvere, then part of Estonian SSR, Soviet Union
- Listed height: 1.85 m (6 ft 1 in)
- Listed weight: 82 kg (181 lb)

Career information
- NBA draft: 2007: undrafted
- Playing career: 2001–present

Career history
- 2001–2004: Rakvere
- 2004–2006: BC Kalev
- 2005–2006: →Kalev II
- 2006: Tartu Fausto
- 2006–2007: Rakvere Tarvas
- 2007: BC Kalev
- 2007: →Kalev II
- 2008: Tamsalu Los Toros
- 2008–2011: Rakvere Tarvas
- 2011: KK Kaunas
- 2011–2013: University of Tartu
- 2013–2014: Rakvere Tarvas
- 2014–2016: Valga
- 2016–2018: TLÜ/Kalev
- 2018–2019: RSK Tarvas
- 2022–present: Tere Kadrina Karud

Career highlights
- Estonian League champion (2005); KML Best Young Player (2004)

Kristo Saage (born 2 February 1985) is an Estonian professional basketball player who plays for Tere Kadrina Karud of the Saku I Liiga. He is a 1.85-metre-tall (6 ft 1 in) point guard. He also represented the Estonian national basketball team internationally.

== Club career ==
Kristo Saage started his basketball career in hometown BC Rakvere Tarvas (then KK Rakvere) at the age of 17. In 2004 Saage signed a deal with Estonian top team BC Kalev/Cramo. He mainly played as a substitution player, who got about 20 minutes per game. With his 3 years spell with BC Kalev/Cramo he became the Estonian champion twice and the Estonian Basketball Cup winner once.

Saage moved to play basketball for BC Rakvere Tarvas once again, sharing his tenure at the first half of the season with now-defunct BC Fausto Tartu, averaging 13.0 points and 3.8 rebounds in 2006–07 season. The following season he spent in BC Kalev/Cramo as a benchboy, so after a year in Tallinn he rejoined BC Rakvere Tarvas.

After achieving Tarvas's highest place in the KML, Saage had an offer from abroad and on 3 January 2011 it was announced that his career continued in Lithuania with KK Kaunas, where he played until the end of the 2011–12 LKL season. After a successful national team summer he signed a contract with the University of Tartu.

== International career ==
Kristo Saage has represented Estonia since junior levels. He first came to prominence in 2004 when he played vital role beating strong Serbia and Montenegro U20, scoring 17 points and playing all 40 minutes. Since 2011 he has been included to Estonian senior team.

== Awards and accomplishments ==
=== Professional career ===
Kalev/Cramo

- Estonian League champion: 2005
- 2× Estonian Cup champion: 2005, 2007

University of Tartu

- Estonian Cup champion: 2011
