= Asko Paade =

Estonian basketball player

No. 12 – Tartu Ülikool
- Position: Power forward
- League: KML; BBL

Personal information
- Born: September 6, 1984 (age 42) Tartu, then part of Estonian SSR, Soviet Union
- Listed height: 6 ft 8.75 in (2.05 m)
- Listed weight: 234 lb (106 kg)

Career information
- Playing career: 2000–2012

Asko Paade (born 6 September 1984) is an Estonian basketball player who last played for Estonian basketball team Tartu Ülikool.

He was also a member of Estonia national basketball team in 2003–2005.

== Honours ==
- 2002–03 Estonian Cup (Tartu Ülikool/Rock)
- 2003–04 Estonian League (Tartu Ülikool/Rock)
- 2004–05 Estonian Cup (Tartu Ülikool/Rock)
- 2006–07 Estonian League (Tartu Ülikool/Rock)
- 2007–08 Estonian League (Tartu Ülikool/Rock)
- 2009–10 Estonian Cup (Tartu Ülikool/Rock)
- 2009–10 Estonian League (Tartu Ülikool/Rock)
- 2010–11 BBL Cup (Tartu Ülikool/Rock)
- 2010–11 Estonian Cup (Tartu Ülikool/Rock)
- 2011–12 Estonian Cup (Tartu Ülikool)
