= Audentese Spordigümnaasium =

Estonian basketball team

- Leagues: I liiga
- Founded: 1967; 58 years ago
- History: List: Tallinna Spordiinternaatkool (1967–1990); Eesti Spordigümnaasium (1990–2000); Audentese Spordigümnaasium (2000–present)
- Arena: Audentes Sports Centre
- Capacity: 1,030
- Location: Tallinn, Estonia
- Team colors: Black, Red, White
- Head coach: Martin Rausberg
- Website: Official website
Home	Away

Audentese Spordigümnaasium (known as TSIK, Audentes and G4S Noorteliiga) is a basketball team based in Tallinn, Estonia. The team plays currently in the Saku I Liiga (Second division in Estonia), in the past Audentes SG/Noortekoondis played also in KML (First division in Estonia). The team was founded as division of the Audentes School, which is the biggest sports school in Estonia and it gives the chance to program's players to study and play basketball at the same time. Their home arena is the Audentes Sports Centre.

Audentes/Noortekoondis is also known to have the best talents from all over Estonia.

== Coaches ==
- Rauno Pehka 2011–2012
- Indrek Visnapuu 2012–2019
- Howard Frier 2019–2020
- Aivar Kuusmaa 2020–2024
- Martin Rausberg 2024–present

== Season by season ==
Season	Tier	Division	Pos.	Postseason	RS	PO	Estonian Cup
2010–11	2	I Liiga	6	–	1–9	–	–
2011–12	2	I Liiga	6	–	2–8	–	–
2012–13	2	I Liiga	6	Quarterfinalist	6–8	3–2	–
2013–14	2	I Liiga	7	–	4–10	–	Round of 32
2014–15	1	Korvpalli Meistriliiga	9	–	1–15	–	–
2015–16	1	Korvpalli Meistriliiga	9	–	0–29	–	Round of 16
2016–17	1	Korvpalli Meistriliiga	9	–	0–16	–	Round of 16
2017–18	1	Korvpalli Meistriliiga	8	–	0–14	–	–

== Players ==
Notable players

Note: Flags indicate national team eligibility at FIBA-sanctioned events. Players may hold other non-FIBA nationalities not displayed.

Criteria

To appear in this section a player must have either:

- Set a club record or won an individual award while at the club
- Played at least one official international match for their national team at any time
- Played at least one official NBA match at any time.

- (Estonia) Sten Sokk
- (Estonia) Kristian Kullamäe
- (Estonia) Siim-Markus Post
- (Estonia) Henri Drell
- (Estonia) Sander Raieste
- (Estonia) Erik Keedus
- (Estonia) Tanel Kurbas
- (Estonia) Aivar Kuusmaa
- (Estonia) Rauno Pehka
- (Estonia) Reinar Hallik
- (Estonia) Kregor Hermet
- (Estonia) Maik-Kalev Kotsar
