= BC Valga-Valka =

Estonian basketball club

Valga-Valka/Maks & Moorits
- Leagues: Latvian–Estonian Basketball League
- Founded: 2001; 25 years ago
- History: Valga KK (2001–2015); BC Valga-Valka (2015–2020)
- Arena: Valga Sports Hall
- Capacity: 561
- Location: Valga, Estonia
- Team colors: Blue, White
Home

BC Valga-Valka was a professional basketball club representing the twin towns of Valga, Estonia and Valka, Latvia. Their home arena was the Valga Sports Hall. From 2015 to 2018 the team uniquely competed in both Estonian and Latvian domestic top leagues.

== History ==
Valga Korvpallikool (Valga Basketball School) was founded in 2001. In 2006, the team won the third tier II Liiga and was promoted to the top tier Korvpalli Meistriliiga (KML). Valga finished the 2006–07 regular season in eighth place and advanced to the playoffs, where they were defeated in the quarterfinals by eventual champions University of Tartu, losing the series 0–2.

Valga finished the 2008–09 regular season in fourth place. In the playoffs, Valga defeated Tallinna Kalev in the quarterfinals, winning the series 3–2, but were swept by University of Tartu in the semifinals. The team faced TTÜ in the third place games, losing the series 0–2 and placing fourth in the final standings. Valga also made their debut in the Baltic Basketball League (BBL) in the 2008–09 season, but failed to advance past the group stage of the Challenge Cup competition.

In July 2015, it was announced that Valga will join the Latvian Basketball League (LBL) for the 2015–16 season, thus becoming the first club to simultaneously compete in both the Estonian and the Latvian League. Valga finished the 2015–16 regular season in sixth place. In the playoffs, the team faced VEF Rīga in the quarterfinals and lost the series 0–3.

== Sponsorship naming ==
Valga has had several denominations through the years due to its sponsorship:

- Valga Welg/Kolmvedu: 2005–2006
- Valga Welg: 2006–2008
- Valga/CKE Inkasso: 2009–2011
- BC Valga/Maks & Moorits: 2012–2015
- BC Valga-Valka/Maks & Moorits: 2015–2020

== Home arena ==
- Valga Sports Hall (2005–2020)

== Players ==
=== Current roster ===
Note: Flags indicate national team eligibility at FIBA-sanctioned events. Players may hold other non-FIBA nationalities not displayed.

Valga-Valka/Maks & Moorits roster
Players
Coaches

| Pos. | No. | Nat. | Name | Ht. | Wt. | Age |
|---|---|---|---|---|---|---|
| SG | 1 | (United States) | King, Dashawn | 1.90 m (6 ft 3 in) | 93 kg (205 lb) | 34 – 16 February 1992 |
| PG | 2 | (Latvia) | Endzels, Elvis | 1.88 m (6 ft 2 in) | 80 kg (176 lb) | 32 – 10 August 1994 |
| SG | 3 | (Estonia) | Kaldre, Tom | 1.90 m (6 ft 3 in) | 80 kg (176 lb) | 28 – 27 June 1998 |
| SG | 4 | (Estonia) | Meister, Kristen | 1.93 m (6 ft 4 in) | 85 kg (187 lb) | 33 – 9 September 1993 |
| PG | 5 | (United States) | Wilson, Clay | 1.90 m (6 ft 3 in) | 77 kg (170 lb) | 34 – 13 August 1992 |
| C | 6 | (United States) | Montgomery, Carl | 2.03 m (6 ft 8 in) | 98 kg (216 lb) | 37 – 15 January 1989 |
| PF | 9 | (Estonia) | Eichfuss, Timo (C) | 2.00 m (6 ft 7 in) | 105 kg (231 lb) | 37 – 19 November 1988 |
| SF | 10 | (Estonia) | Peterson, Robert | 1.93 m (6 ft 4 in) | 92 kg (203 lb) | 36 – 27 March 1990 |
| PF | 11 | (Estonia) | Jurtom, Martin | 2.00 m (6 ft 7 in) | 89 kg (196 lb) | 32 – 11 March 1994 |
| SF | 22 | (Latvia) | Miglinieks, Kristaps | 1.96 m (6 ft 5 in) | 95 kg (209 lb) | 36 – 22 January 1990 |
| C | 33 | (Latvia) | Sīpoliņš, Guntis | 2.07 m (6 ft 9 in) | 95 kg (209 lb) | 32 – 10 November 1993 |

Head coach

- (Russia) Mikhail Karpenko

Legend

- (C) Team captain
- Injured

- Roster
Updated: 6 November 2018

=== Depth chart ===
| Pos. | Starting 5 | Bench 1 | Bench 2 |
|---|---|---|---|
| C | Guntis Sīpoliņš | Carl Montgomery |
| PF | Timo Eichfuss | Martin Jurtom |
| SF | Kristaps Miglinieks | Robert Peterson |
| SG | Dashawn King | Tom Kaldre | Kristen Meister |
| PG | Clay Wilson | Elvis Endzels |

== Coaches ==
- (Estonia) Jaanus Liivak 2005–2009
- (Lithuania) Augenijus Vaškys 2009–2010
- (Estonia) Andrus Renter 2010–2011
- (Dominican Republic) Ozell Wells 2011
- (Latvia) Varis Krūmiņš 2011–2012, 2014–2016
- (Estonia) Tarmo Petter 2012
- (Latvia) Sandis Buškevics 2012–2014
- (Latvia) Juris Umbraško 2016–2017
- (Latvia) Kristaps Zeids 2017–2018
- (Latvia) Armands Misus 2018
- (Russia) Mikhail Karpenko 2018–2019
- (Serbia) Marko Zarkovič 2019–2020

== Season by season ==
| Season | Tier | Division | Pos. | W–L | Estonian Cup | Latvian Basketball League | | | Baltic Basketball League | | |
|---|---|---|---|---|---|---|---|---|---|---|---|
| 2005–06 | 3 | II Liiga | 1st | 19–3 | Round of 16 | – | – | – | – | – | – |
| 2006–07 | 1 | Korvpalli Meistriliiga | 8th | 14–20 | Fourth place | – | – | – | – | – | – |
| 2007–08 | 1 | Korvpalli Meistriliiga | 6th | 18–16 | Quarterfinalist | – | – | – | – | – | – |
| 2008–09 | 1 | Korvpalli Meistriliiga | 4th | 17–19 | Quarterfinalist | – | – | – | BBL Challenge Cup | RS | 4–10 |
| 2009–10 | 1 | Korvpalli Meistriliiga | 5th | 11–18 | Quarterfinalist | – | – | – | BBL Challenge Cup | RS | 1–7 |
| 2010–11 | 1 | Korvpalli Meistriliiga | 5th | 15–21 | Quarterfinalist | – | – | – | – | – | – |
| 2011–12 | 1 | Korvpalli Meistriliiga | 8th | 3–24 | Quarterfinalist | – | – | – | – | – | – |
| 2012–13 | 1 | Korvpalli Meistriliiga | 7th | 13–18 | Quarterfinalist | – | – | – | Baltic Basketball League | RS | 2–8 |
| 2013–14 | 1 | Korvpalli Meistriliiga | 8th | 6–27 | Quarterfinalist | – | – | – | Baltic Basketball League | RS | 0–12 |
| 2014–15 | 1 | Korvpalli Meistriliiga | 6th | 12–19 | Quarterfinalist | – | – | – | Baltic Basketball League | RS | 4–8 |
| 2015–16 | 1 | Korvpalli Meistriliiga | 8th | 10–22 | Quarterfinalist | Latvijas Basketbola Līga | QF | 11–12 | – | – | – |
| 2016–17 | 1 | Korvpalli Meistriliiga | 6th | 10–20 | Fourth place | Latvijas Basketbola Līga | RS | 3–15 | – | – | – |
| 2017–18 | 1 | Korvpalli Meistriliiga | 5th | 13–17 | – | Latvijas Basketbola Līga | QF | 6–13 | – | – | – |
