= TTÜ/A. Le Coq =

Estonian basketball club

- Founded: 2000; 25 years ago
- Dissolved: 2004
- History: BC Hotronic (2000–2002); TTÜ/A. Le Coq (2002–2004)
- Arena: TTÜ Sports Hall
- Location: Tallinn

TTÜ/A. Le Coq was an Estonian professional basketball club founded in 2000 and dissolved in 2004. The club played in the Estonian League.

The team played its home games at TTÜ Sports Hall.

== History ==
Founded in 2000 as BC Hotronic, the club changed its name to TTÜ/A. Le Coq in 2002, after title sponsors A. Le Coq and Tallinn University of Technology. TTÜ/A. Le Coq finished the 2002–03 season as runners-up behind Tallinna Kalev, losing the finals 2–4. The club dissolved in 2004.
