= 2008–09 KML season =

Estonian national championships in basketball

SEB Korvpalli Meistriliiga^{1}
- Season: 2008–09
- Duration: 15 October 2008 – 1 June 2009
- Teams: 8

Regular season
- Top seed: TÜ/Rock

Finals
- Champions: Kalev/Cramo; 3rd title
- Runners-up: TÜ/Rock
- Third place: TTÜ
- Fourth place: Valga
- Finals MVP: (Estonia) Kristjan Kangur

Statistical leaders
| Points | (Estonia) Kristo Saage | 16.24 |
| Rebounds | (Estonia) Raido Ringmets | 11.04 |
| Assists | (Georgia (country)) Giorgi Tsintsadze | 4.20 |
- ^{1} Sponsored league name, referring to SEB.

The 2008–09 SEB Korvpalli Meistriliiga is the 18th season of the Estonian basketball league and the fifth under the title sponsorship of SEB. Including the competition's previous incarnations, this is the 84th season of the Estonian men's basketball league. TÜ/Rock came into the season as defending champions of the 2007–08 KML season.

The season started on 15 October 2008 and concluded on 1 June 2009 with Kalev/Cramo defeating TÜ/Rock 4 games to 2 in the 2009 KML Finals to win their 3rd Estonian League title.

== Teams ==
| Team | Location | Arena | Capacity |
|---|---|---|---|
| Kalev/Cramo | Tallinn | Saku Suurhall | 7,200 |
| Kuremaa | Tallinn | Torma Sports Hall | |
| Pärnu/Catwees | Pärnu | Pärnu kesklinna koolide võimla | |
| Rakvere Tarvas | Rakvere | Rakvere Sports Hall | 2,747 |
| Tallinna Kalev | Tallinn | Pirita Gymnasium of Economics | |
| TTÜ | Tallinn | TTÜ Sports Hall | 1,000 |
| TÜ/Rock | Tartu | University of Tartu Sports Hall | 1,650 |
| Valga | Valga | Valga Sports Hall | 561 |

== Regular season ==
=== League table ===
| Pos | Team | Pld | W | L | Pts | PCT | Qualification |
|---|---|---|---|---|---|---|---|
| 1 | TÜ/Rock | 28 | 26 | 2 | 54 | .929 | Qualification to Playoffs |
| 2 | Kalev/Cramo | 28 | 23 | 5 | 51 | .821 | Qualification to Playoffs |
| 3 | TTÜ | 28 | 17 | 11 | 45 | .607 | Qualification to Playoffs |
| 4 | Valga | 28 | 14 | 14 | 42 | .500 | Qualification to Playoffs |
| 5 | Tallinna Kalev | 28 | 11 | 17 | 39 | .393 | Qualification to Playoffs |
| 6 | Rakvere Tarvas | 28 | 10 | 18 | 38 | .357 | Qualification to Playoffs |
| 7 | Pärnu/Catwees | 28 | 8 | 20 | 36 | .286 | |
| 8 | Kuremaa | 28 | 3 | 25 | 13 | .107 | |

Updated to match(es) played on 1 June 2009. Source: KML (2008/2009)

== Playoffs ==
The playoffs began on 23 April 2009 and ended on 1 June 2009. The tournament concluded with Kalev/Cramo defeating TÜ/Rock 4 games to 2 in the 2009 KML Finals.

=== Bracket ===
Quarter-finals
4 | Valga | 3
5 | Tallinna Kalev | 2
3 | TTÜ | 3
6 | Rakvere Tarvas | 0

Semi-finals
1 | TÜ/Rock | 3
4 | Valga | 0
2 | Kalev/Cramo | 3
3 | TTÜ | 0

Finals
1 | TÜ/Rock | 2
2 | Kalev/Cramo | 4
Third place
3 | TTÜ | 2
4 | Valga | 0

== Individual statistics ==
Players qualify to this category by having at least 50% games played.

=== Points ===
| Rank | Player | Team | Games | Points | PPG |
|---|---|---|---|---|---|
| 1 | (Estonia) Kristo Saage | Rakvere Tarvas | 29 | 471 | 16.24 |
| 2 | (Russia) Evgeny Belousov | Tallinna Kalev | 21 | 336 | 16.00 |
| 3 | (Estonia) Heigo Erm | Pärnu/Catwees | 21 | 310 | 14.76 |
| 4 | (Georgia (country)) Viktor Sanikidze | TÜ/Rock | 29 | 422 | 14.55 |
| 5 | (Estonia) Veljo Vares | Tallinna Kalev | 30 | 435 | 14.50 |

=== Rebounds ===
| Rank | Player | Team | Games | Rebounds | RPG |
|---|---|---|---|---|---|
| 1 | (Estonia) Raido Ringmets | Pärnu/Catwees | 26 | 287 | 11.04 |
| 2 | (Canada) Richard Anderson | Valga | 35 | 300 | 8.57 |
| 3 | (Georgia (country)) Viktor Sanikidze | TÜ/Rock | 29 | 222 | 7.66 |
| 4 | (Estonia) Joosep Toome | TTÜ | 33 | 241 | 7.30 |
| 5 | (United States) Nate Fox | Kalev/Cramo | 23 | 164 | 7.13 |

=== Assists ===
| Rank | Player | Team | Games | Assists | APG |
|---|---|---|---|---|---|
| 1 | (Georgia (country)) Giorgi Tsintsadze | TÜ/Rock | 30 | 126 | 4.20 |
| 2 | (United States) John Linehan | Kalev/Cramo | 26 | 94 | 3.62 |
| 3 | (Estonia) Heiko Rannula | Valga | 36 | 120 | 3.33 |
| 4 | (Estonia) Sven Pugonen | Rakvere Tarvas | 27 | 82 | 3.04 |
| 5 | (Estonia) Raido Roos | Valga | 31 | 91 | 2.94 |

== Awards ==
=== Finals MVP ===
- (Estonia) Kristjan Kangur (Kalev/Cramo)
