= 2015 KML Playoffs =

Estonian national championships in basketball

The 2015 KML Playoffs was the final phase of the 2014–15 KML season. The playoffs began on 7 April and ended on 22 May. The tournament concluded with TÜ/Rock defeating Kalev/Cramo 4 games to 1 in the finals. Tanel Kurbas was named KML Finals MVP.

== Bracket ==
Quarter-finals
1	TÜ/Rock	3
8	TLÜ/Kalev	0
4	Rakvere Tarvas	3
5	Pärnu	2
2	Kalev/Cramo	3
7	TTÜ	0
3	TYCO Rapla	3
6	Valga/Maks & Moorits	1

Semi-finals
1	TÜ/Rock	3
4	Rakvere Tarvas	2
2	Kalev/Cramo	3
3	TYCO Rapla	0

Finals
1	TÜ/Rock	4
2	Kalev/Cramo	1
Third place
3	TYCO Rapla	2
4	Rakvere Tarvas	1

== Quarter-finals ==
The quarter-finals are best-of-5 series.

=== TÜ/Rock vs. TLÜ/Kalev ===
10 April
19:00

Boxscore

TÜ/Rock	90–63	TLÜ/Kalev
Scoring by quarter: 21–13, 19–14, 27–14, 23–22
Pts: Talts 18; Rebs: Toome 13; Asts: Sokk 6		Pts: Maduabum 13; Rebs: Grabauskas 7 Asts: Roos, Tamm 3

University of Tartu Sports Hall, Tartu
Attendance: 800
Referees: Rain Rannamets, Indrek Kelement, Jegor Mitrofanski

14 April
19:00

Boxscore

TLÜ/Kalev	62–101	TÜ/Rock
Scoring by quarter: 17–25, 13–25, 17–27, 15–24
Pts: Tamm 14; Rebs: Grabauskas 5 Asts: four players 2		Pts: Pečiukevičius, Toome 18; Rebs: Toome 8 Asts: Pečiukevičius 4

Kalev Sports Hall, Tallinn
Attendance: 350
Referees: Timo Suslov, Rauno Peerandi, Risto Visnapuu

16 April
19:00

Boxscore

TÜ/Rock	86–62	TLÜ/Kalev
Scoring by quarter: 18–15, 29–15, 16–9, 23–23
Pts: Talts 23; Rebs: Toome 9 Asts: Pečiukevičius 4		Pts: Belousov 15; Rebs: Grabauskas 7 Asts: Droney, Roos 4
TÜ/Rock wins series 3–0

University of Tartu Sports Hall, Tartu
Attendance: 250
Referees: Mart Uuehendrik, Janek Saluse, Ivo Kitsing

=== Kalev/Cramo vs. TTÜ ===
7 April
19:00

Boxscore

Kalev/Cramo	90–62	TTÜ
Scoring by quarter: 24–12, 14–12, 28–21, 24–17
Pts: Dorbek 20; Rebs: Dorbek 9 Asts: Dorbek 10		Pts: three players 15; Rebs: Järveläinen, Makke 10; Asts: Kaja 5

Kalev Sports Hall, Tallinn
Attendance: 600
Referees: Rain Peerandi, Indrek Kelement, Toomas Nõmmiste

18 April
18:30

Boxscore

TTÜ	80–92 (OT)	Kalev/Cramo
Scoring by quarter: 25–19, 19–18, 14–21, 18–18, Overtime: 4–16
Pts: Makke 26; Rebs: Arnold 9 Asts: Puidet 4		Pts: Veideman 26; Rebs: Benson 17; Asts: Veideman 5

TTÜ Sports Hall, Tallinn
Attendance: 450
Referees: Janek Saluse, Aleksei Mohov, Rauno Peerandi

18 April
18:30

Boxscore

Kalev/Cramo	101–52	TTÜ
Scoring by quarter: 28–10, 27–11, 26–21, 20–10
Pts: Machado 23; Rebs: Machado 11; Asts: Machado 6		Pts: Akenpärg 14; Rebs: Raudla 9 Asts: Akenpärg 3
Kalev/Cramo wins series 3–0

Kalev Sports Hall, Tallinn
Attendance: 400
Referees: Timo Suslov, Mihkel Männiste, Ranno Konks

=== TYCO Rapla vs. Valga/Maks & Moorits ===
10 April
19:00

Boxscore

TYCO Rapla	77–80	Valga/Maks & Moorits
Scoring by quarter: 14–20, 14–23, 27–16, 22–21
Pts: Ežerskis 19; Rebs: Keerles 11; Asts: Laane 5		Pts: Strupovičs 19; Rebs: Aleksejevs 12; Asts: Saage, Strupovičs 2

Sadolin Sports Hall, Rapla
Attendance: 950
Referees: Timo Suslov, Mihkel Männiste, Madis Allik

13 April
19:00

Boxscore

Valga/Maks & Moorits	67–84	TYCO Rapla
Scoring by quarter: 16–19, 19–24, 16–16, 16–25
Pts: Strupovičs 25; Rebs: Saage 7 Asts: Aleksejevs, Saage 4		Pts: Keerles 22; Rebs: Keerles 12; Asts: Laane 6

Valga Sports Hall, Valga
Attendance: 500
Referees: Rain Peerandi, Janek Saluse, Aleksei Mohov

16 April
19:00

Boxscore

TYCO Rapla	65–61	Valga/Maks & Moorits
Scoring by quarter: 16–16, 23–13, 8–18, 18–14
Pts: Bubalo 20; Rebs: Keerles 10; Asts: Laane 6		Pts: Strupovičs 18; Rebs: Aleksejevs 8 Asts: Saage 3

Sadolin Sports Hall, Rapla
Attendance: 970
Referees: Aare Halliko, Tanel Suslov, Jegor Mitrofanski

18 April
18:00

Boxscore

Valga/Maks & Moorits	69–88	TYCO Rapla
Scoring by quarter: 8–32, 19–18, 18–18, 24–20
Pts: Aleksejevs 18; Rebs: Aleksejevs 14; Asts: Saage 4		Pts: Soo 19; Rebs: Barksdale 9 Asts: Laane 5
TYCO Rapla wins series 3–1

Valga Sports Hall, Valga
Attendance: 500
Referees: Rain Peerandi, Rain Rannamets, Madis Allik

=== Rakvere Tarvas vs. Pärnu ===
9 April
19:00

Boxscore

Rakvere Tarvas	87–77	Pärnu
Scoring by quarter: 15–22, 21–22, 24–20, 27–13
Pts: Raley-Ross 36; Rebs: Haughton 11; Asts: Špan 5		Pts: Silavs 17; Rebs: Lindmets 7 Asts: Raap 5

Rakvere Sports Hall, Rakvere
Attendance: 800
Referees: Tanel Suslov, Mihkel Männiste, Ranno Konks

12 April
17:00

Boxscore

Pärnu	75–66	Rakvere Tarvas
Scoring by quarter: 23–23, 22–12, 16–14, 14–17
Pts: Miljković, Vahter 12; Rebs: Lindmets 6 Asts: Silavs 10		Pts: Raley-Ross 20; Rebs: Haughton 9 Asts: Raley-Ross 4

Pärnu Sports Hall, Pärnu
Attendance: 750
Referees: Aare Halliko, Madis Allik, Aleksei Mohov

15 April
19:00

Boxscore

Rakvere Tarvas	80–90	Pärnu
Scoring by quarter: 13–25, 26–19, 21–25, 20–21
Pts: Raley-Ross 18; Rebs: Raley-Ross 9 Asts: Špan 4		Pts: Raap 19; Rebs: Silavs 8 Asts: Raap 7

Rakvere Sports Hall, Rakvere
Attendance: 850
Referees: Tanel Suslov, Rain Peerandi, Rain Rannamets

17 April
18:00

Boxscore

Pärnu	50–65	Rakvere Tarvas
Scoring by quarter: 14–24, 10–17, 12–14, 14–10
Pts: Kirves, Leppik 12; Rebs: Kirves 7 Asts: Silavs 3		Pts: Hallik 19; Rebs: Haughton 14; Asts: Špan, Umbraško 3

Pärnu Sports Hall, Pärnu
Attendance: 950
Referees: Mart Uuehendrik, Timo Suslov, Janek Saluse

19 April
17:00

Boxscore

Rakvere Tarvas	75–71	Pärnu
Scoring by quarter: 26–15, 19–25, 14–15, 16–16
Pts: Hallik 21; Rebs: Hallik 8 Asts: three players 4		Pts: Silavs 18; Rebs: Lindmets 7 Asts: Silavs 6
Rakvere Tarvas wins series 3–2

Rakvere Sports Hall, Rakvere
Attendance: 1,200
Referees: Tanel Suslov, Rain Peerandi, Aleksei Mohov

== Semi-finals ==
The quarter-finals are best-of-5 series.

=== TÜ/Rock vs. Rakvere Tarvas ===
24 April
19:00

Boxscore

TÜ/Rock	81–84 (OT)	Rakvere Tarvas
Scoring by quarter: 18–14, 20–18, 9–21, 15–9, Overtime: 5–5, 14–17
Pts: Talts 18; Rebs: Talts 12; Asts: Sokk, Talts 4		Pts: Raley-Ross 41; Rebs: Raley-Ross 13; Asts: Špan 4

University of Tartu Sports Hall, Tartu
Attendance: 1,500
Referees: Mart Uuehendrik, Timo Suslov, Rain Rannamets

29 April
19:00

Boxscore

Rakvere Tarvas	65–71	TÜ/Rock
Scoring by quarter: 14–19, 17–18, 16–15, 18–19
Pts: Raley-Ross 26; Rebs: Haughton, Umbraško 7 Asts: Raley-Ross 4		Pts: Pečiukevičius 19; Rebs: Talts 19; Asts: Pečiukevičius 6

Rakvere Sports Hall, Rakvere
Attendance: 1,800
Referees: Aare Halliko, Rain Peerandi, Janek Saluse

2 May
17:00

Boxscore

TÜ/Rock	86–73	Rakvere Tarvas
Scoring by quarter: 19–17, 23–13, 21–16, 23–27
Pts: Talts 23; Rebs: Talts 12; Asts: Sokk 5		Pts: Raley-Ross 24; Rebs: Haughton 8 Asts: three players 2

University of Tartu Sports Hall, Tartu
Attendance: 1,800
Referees: Tanel Suslov, Mihkel Männiste, Rauno Peerandi

5 May
19:00

Boxscore

Rakvere Tarvas	89–81	TÜ/Rock
Scoring by quarter: 19–17, 20–19, 24–23, 26–22
Pts: Raley-Ross 28; Rebs: Haughton 8 Asts: Hallik 7		Pts: Sokk 25; Rebs: Talts 10; Asts: Talts 4

Rakvere Sports Hall, Rakvere
Attendance: 1,300
Referees: Aare Halliko, Mart Uuehendrik, Jegor Mitrofanski

6 May
19:00

Boxscore

TÜ/Rock	60–57	Rakvere Tarvas
Scoring by quarter: 14–17, 21–17, 9–11, 16–12
Pts: Sokk 18; Rebs: Dorbek 8 Asts: Sokk, Talts 4		Pts: Raley-Ross 16; Rebs: Haughton 11; Asts: Raley-Ross 7
TÜ/Rock wins series 3–2

University of Tartu Sports Hall, Tartu
Attendance: 2,000
Referees: Tanel Suslov, Rain Peerandi, Mihkel Männiste

=== Kalev/Cramo vs. TYCO Rapla ===
26 April
17:00

Boxscore

Kalev/Cramo	78–56	TYCO Rapla
Scoring by quarter: 12–20, 31–9, 18–16, 17–11
Pts: Benson 24; Rebs: Benson 12; Asts: Machado 8		Pts: Keerles 12; Rebs: Keerles 15; Asts: Laane 4

Saku Suurhall, Tallinn
Attendance: 1,600
Referees: Timo Suslov, Mihkel Männiste, Ranno Konks

28 April
19:00

Boxscore

TYCO Rapla	58–91	Kalev/Cramo
Scoring by quarter: 12–35, 19–13, 11–30, 16–13
Pts: Bubalo 14; Rebs: Bubalo, Paasoja 4 Asts: Laane 9		Pts: Veideman 24; Rebs: Kitsing 8 Asts: Veideman 6

Sadolin Sports Hall, Rapla
Attendance: 1,010
Referees: Aare Halliko, Rain Peerandi, Jegor Mitrofanski

4 May
19:00

Boxscore

Kalev/Cramo	94–71	TYCO Rapla
Scoring by quarter: 17–22, 26–14, 21–18, 30–17
Pts: Benson, Pecherov 18; Rebs: Keedus, Singler 6 Asts: Machado 6		Pts: Bubalo 16; Rebs: Bubalo 5 Asts: Bubalo, Soo 4
Kalev/Cramo wins series 3–0

Saku Suurhall, Tallinn
Attendance: 1,200
Referees: Tanel Suslov, Madis Allik, Aleksei Mohov

== Third place games ==
The finals are best-of-3 series.

=== TYCO Rapla vs. Rakvere Tarvas ===
11 May
19:00

Boxscore

Rakvere Tarvas	70–64	TYCO Rapla
Scoring by quarter: 21–19, 12–15, 15–21, 22–9
Pts: Raley-Ross 22; Rebs: Haughton 14; Asts: Hallik, Špan 3		Pts: Barksdale, Paasoja 12; Rebs: Barksdale 6 Asts: Bubalo 3

Rakvere Sports Hall, Rakvere
Attendance: 1,300
Referees: Mart Uuehendrik, Janek Saluse, Rauno Peerandi

13 May
19:00

Boxscore

TYCO Rapla	76–61	Rakvere Tarvas
Scoring by quarter: 18–19, 20–14, 19–8, 19–20
Pts: Bubalo 17; Rebs: Barksdale 9 Asts: Ežerskis, Laane 5		Pts: Umbraško 15; Rebs: Haughton 6 Asts: Špan 4

Sadolin Sports Hall, Rapla
Attendance: 1,100
Referees: Tanel Suslov, Timo Suslov, Madis Allik

15 May
19:00

Boxscore

TYCO Rapla	87–64	Rakvere Tarvas
Scoring by quarter: 19–19, 20–26, 24–12, 24–7
Pts: Bubalo 24; Rebs: Barksdale, Bubalo 6 Asts: Paasoja 5		Pts: Raley-Ross 22; Rebs: Haughton 10; Asts: Raley-Ross 5
TYCO Rapla wins series 2–1

Sadolin Sports Hall, Rapla
Attendance: 1,500
Referees: Mart Uuehendrik, Rain Peerandi, Jegor Mitrofanski

== Finals ==
The finals are best-of-7 series.

=== TÜ/Rock vs. Kalev/Cramo ===
14 May
19:00

Boxscore

TÜ/Rock	63–77	Kalev/Cramo
Scoring by quarter: 10–15, 15–15, 15–22, 23–25
Pts: Toome 16; Rebs: Talts 12; Asts: Kriisa 4		Pts: Veideman 17; Rebs: Benson, Machado 8 Asts: Machado 7

University of Tartu Sports Hall, Tartu
Attendance: 2,200
Referees: Tanel Suslov, Mihkel Männiste, Jegor Mitrofanski

16 May
17:00

Boxscore

TÜ/Rock	68–61	Kalev/Cramo
Scoring by quarter: 13–20, 20–6, 24–20, 11–15
Pts: Kurbas 21; Rebs: Talts 12; Asts: Kurbas, Talts 2		Pts: Benson, Machado 17; Rebs: Machado 13; Asts: Machado 4

University of Tartu Sports Hall, Tartu
Attendance: 2,000
Referees: Rain Peerandi, Timo Suslov, Mihkel Männiste

18 May
19:00

Boxscore

Kalev/Cramo	66–77	TÜ/Rock
Scoring by quarter: 18–17, 13–13, 16–17, 19–30
Pts: Machado 25; Rebs: Benson 12; Asts: Machado, Veideman 4		Pts: Kurbas 19; Rebs: Kurbas 10; Asts: Sokk 6

Saku Suurhall, Tallinn
Attendance: 4,250
Referees: Aare Halliko, Tanel Suslov, Ranno Konks

20 May
19:00

Boxscore

Kalev/Cramo	61–77	TÜ/Rock
Scoring by quarter: 14–27, 17–21, 18–16, 12–13
Pts: Benson 21; Rebs: Benson 9 Asts: Machado 5		Pts: Kurbas 21; Rebs: Talts 11; Asts: Sokk 5

Saku Suurhall, Tallinn
Attendance: 4,000
Referees: Aare Halliko, Rain Peerandi, Aleksei Mohov

22 May
19:00

Boxscore

TÜ/Rock	86–67	Kalev/Cramo
Scoring by quarter: 21–22, 29–12, 15–21, 21–12
Pts: Sokk 21; Rebs: Eichfuss 7 Asts: Sokk 8		Pts: Benson 22; Rebs: Benson, Šķēle 7 Asts: Machado, Šķēle 4
TÜ/Rock wins series 4–1

University of Tartu Sports Hall, Tartu
Attendance: 1,899
Referees: Aare Halliko, Tanel Suslov, Jegor Mitrofanski
