= 2011–12 KML season =

Estonian national championships in basketball

KML season 2011–12
- League: G4S Korvpalli Meistriliiga
- Sport: Basketball
- Duration: October 4, 2011 – May 26, 2012
- Total attendance: 1,394 (playoffs average)
- TV partner: ETV2

Regular season
- Top seed: University of Tartu
- Season MVP: Kaspars Cipruss (BC Rakvere Tarvas)
- Top scorer: Reinis Strupovics (Valga/CKE Inkasso) 20.92
- Finals champions: BC Kalev/Cramo
- Runners-up: University of Tartu
- Finals MVP: Tanel Sokk (BC Kalev/Cramo)

KML seasons
- ← 2010–11 2012–13 →

The Korvpalli Meistriliiga 2011–12 (KML) was the eighty-eighth season of top-tier basketball in Estonia. The season began in October 2011 and ended on 17 May 2012. The defending champion BC Kalev/Cramo won its 5th league title.

== Team information ==
=== Stadia and locations ===
KML season 2011–12 – Club Locations

Team	Home city	Stadium	Capacity
BC Kalev/Cramo	Tallinn	Saku Suurhall; Kalev Sports Hall	7,200; 1,000
BC Rakvere Tarvas	Rakvere	Rakvere Sports Hall	2,422
KK Pärnu	Pärnu	Pärnu Sports Hall	2,000
Piimameister Otto/Rapla	Rapla	Sadolin Sports Hall	1,000
BC Tallinna Kalev	Tallinn	Kalev Sports Hall	1,000
TTÜ KK	Tallinn	TTÜ Sports Hall	1,050
University of Tartu	Tartu	Tartu University Sports Hall	4,000
Valga/CKE Inkasso	Valga	Valga Sports Hall	1,000

== Regular season ==
	Team	Pld	W	L	PF	PA	Diff	Qualification
1	University of Tartu	28	25	3	2447	2008	+439	Qualified for the semifinals
2	BC Kalev/Cramo	28	23	5	2220	1685	+535	Qualified for the semifinals
3	BC Rakvere Tarvas	28	19	9	2324	2028	+296	Qualified for the quarterfinals
4	Piimameister Otto/Rapla	28	14	14	2114	2120	-6	Qualified for the quarterfinals
5	TTÜ KK	28	12	16	2136	2223	–87	Qualified for the quarterfinals
6	BC Tallinna Kalev	28	12	16	2050	2219	–169	Qualified for the quarterfinals
7	KK Pärnu	28	4	24	2002	2542	–540	
8	Valga/CKE Inkasso	28	3	25	1870	2338	–468	Relegation play-offs

== Play-offs ==
Quarterfinals
4	PMO/Rapla	3
5	TTÜ KK	1
3	BC Rakvere Tarvas	3
6	BC Tallinna Kalev	0

Semifinals
1	University of Tartu	3
4	PMO/Rapla	0
2	BC Kalev/Cramo	3
3	BC Rakvere Tarvas	0

Finals
1	University of Tartu	0
2	BC Kalev/Cramo	4
Third place
3	BC Rakvere Tarvas	2
4	PMO/Rapla	0

== Play-off games ==
Quarter-finals

April 6
19:00

Report

Tarvas	94–76	Kalev
Scoring by quarter: 22–25, 25–15, 21–11, 26–25
Pts: Sirsniņš, Cipruss 20; Rebs: Cipruss 14; Asts: Sirsniņš 9		Pts: Kurg, Raley-Ross 17; Rebs: Fedorchuk 9 Asts: three players 2

Rakvere Sports Hall, Rakvere
Attendance: 1,231
Referees: A. Halliko, R. Peerandi, R. Rannamets

April 8
17:00

Report

Rapla	92–65	TTÜ
Scoring by quarter: 25-20, 27–16, 23–19, 17–10
Pts: Laane 24; Rebs: Kajupank 7 Asts: Laane 8		Pts: Akenpärg 19; Rebs: Kaja 7 Asts: Arnold 4

Sadolin Sports Hall, Rapla
Attendance: 911
Referees: T. Suslov, R. Peerandi, I. Kelement

April 9
19:00

Report

Kalev	82–92	Tarvas
Scoring by quarter: 13–29, 23–19, 23–15, 23–29
Pts: Shaw 27; Rebs: Shaw 9 Asts: Kurg 7		Pts: Hallik 18; Rebs: Cipruss 11; Asts: Dorbek 4

Kalev Sports Hall, Tallinn
Attendance: 500
Referees: A. Tobi, O. Jakobson, J. Saluse

April 10
18:30

Report

TTÜ	73–72	Rapla
Scoring by quarter: 26–13, 16–17, 22–18, 9–24
Pts: Makke 21; Rebs: Keedus 11; Asts: Pilk, Arnold 4		Pts: Kaldre 18; Rebs: Pärn 8 Asts: Laane, Soo 4

TTÜ Sports Hall, Tallinn
Attendance: 1,300
Referees: A. Halliko, O. Jakobson, J. Vendel

April 12
19:00

Report

Rapla	69–58	TTÜ
Scoring by quarter: 21–20, 13-9, 13-17, 22-12
Pts: Soo 19; Rebs: Laane 11; Asts: Rait-Riivo Laane 7		Pts: Pilk 16; Rebs: Pilk 8 Asts: Pilk, Raudla 2

Sadolin Sports Hall, Rapla
Attendance: 1,012
Referees: A. Tobi, T. Suslov, R. Rannamets

April 13
19:00

Report

Tarvas	89–76	Kalev
Scoring by quarter: 20-22, 25-16, 22-21, 22-17
Pts: Cipruss 23; Rebs: Vahter, Dorbek 8 Asts: Hallik 5		Pts: Raley-Ross 23; Rebs: Raley-Ross 11; Asts: Raley-Ross 6

Rakvere Sports Hall, Rakvere
Attendance: 1,234
Referees: Ta. Suslov, Ti. Suslov, M. Allik

April 14
19:00

Report

TTÜ	62–68	Rapla
Scoring by quarter: 18-14, 13-23, 15-8, 16-23
Pts: Makke 16; Rebs: Keedus, Puidet 9 Asts: Pilk 6		Pts: Laane 15; Rebs: Pärn 7 Asts: Laane, Soo 2

TTÜ Sports Hall, Tallinn
Attendance: 1,500
Referees: T. Suslov, A. Halliko, J. Saluse

Semi-finals

April 20
20:00

Report

UT	108–70	Rapla
Scoring by quarter: 30-7, 22-19, 27-26, 29-18
Pts: Kurbas 24; Rebs: Saage 9 Asts: Sokk 8		Pts: Soo 22; Rebs: Pärn 5 Asts: Laane 5

Tartu University Sports Hall, Tartu
Attendance: 1,000
Referees: T. Suslov, R. Peerandi, R. Rannamets

April 23
20:00

Report

Kalev/Cramo	92–84	Tarvas
Scoring by quarter: 25-18, 18-15, 17-30, 32-21
Pts: Šķēle 19; Rebs: Fall, Dorbek 6 Asts: Sokk 10		Pts: Sirsniņš 26; Rebs: Cipruss 10; Asts: Sirsniņš 5

Kalev Sports Hall, Tallinn
Attendance: 1,100
Referees: A. Halliko, A. Tobi, J. Saluse

April 25
20:00

Report

Rapla	72–81	UT
Scoring by quarter: 20-23, 20-20, 16-14, 16-24
Pts: Pärn 19; Rebs: Pärn 10; Asts: Laane 4		Pts: Sokk 26; Rebs: Allingu 9 Asts: Sokk 4

Sadolin Sports Hall, Rapla
Attendance: 1,121
Referees: A. Halliko, A. Tobi, O. Jakobson

April 27
20:00

Report

Tarvas	65–66	Kalev/Cramo
Scoring by quarter: 7-10, 16-11, 23-19, 19-26
Pts: Sirsniņš 17; Rebs: Cipruss 14; Asts: three players 2		Pts: Sokk 18; Rebs: Ulyanko 9 Asts: Tanel Sokk 3

Rakvere Sports Hall, Rakvere
Attendance: 1,500
Referees: M. Uuehendrik, T. Suslov, O. Jakobson

April 29
16:00

Report

UT	95–56	Rapla
Scoring by quarter: 27-13, 20-12, 23-20, 25-11
Pts: Kurbas 17; Rebs: Allingu, Raadik 8 Asts: Sokk, Kriisa 6		Pts: Kaldre 12; Rebs: Nurger 5 Asts: Laane 3

Tartu University Sports Hall, Tartu
Attendance: 600
Referees: M. Uuehendrik, T. Suslov, I. Kelement

May 1
20:00

Report

Kalev/Cramo	91–69	Tarvas
Scoring by quarter: 22-26, 16-10, 22-19, 31-14
Pts: Ulyanko 20; Rebs: Fall 10; Asts: four players 4		Pts: Cipruss 16; Rebs: Umbraško 8 Asts: Sirsniņš 6

Kalev Sports Hall, Tallinn
Attendance: 1,000
Referees: T. Suslov, R. Peerandi, R. Rannamets

3rd place play-off

May 5
17:00

Report

Rapla	66–105	Tarvas
Scoring by quarter: 16-26, 19-23, 19-26, 12-30
Pts: Pärn 16; Rebs: Pärn 6 Asts: Jurtom 4		Pts: Cipruss 27; Rebs: Umbraško 12; Asts: Sirsniņš 5

Sadolin Sports Hall, Rapla
Attendance: 882
Referees: A. Tobi, T. Suslov, J. Saluse

May 7
19:00

Report

Tarvas	69–58	Rapla
Scoring by quarter: 17-14, 13-16, 21-14, 18-14
Pts: Umbraško 22; Rebs: Umbraško, Hallik 10; Asts: Dorbek 6		Pts: Kajupank 15; Rebs: Ringmets 15; Asts: Laane 5

Rakvere Sports Hall, Rakvere
Attendance: 800
Referees: A. Halliko, T. Suslov, O. Jakobson

Finals

May 10
20:00

Report

UT	63–75	Kalev/Cramo
Scoring by quarter: 20-23, 15-16, 18-19, 10-17
Pts: S. Sokk 12; Rebs: Amis 7 Asts: Kriisa 4		Pts: T. Sokk, Arbet 13; Rebs: Fall 11; Asts: T. Sokk 4

Tartu University Sports Hall, Tartu
Attendance: 2,000
Referees: T. Suslov, A. Tobi, M. Uuehendrik

May 12
16:00

Report

UT	66–84	Kalev/Cramo
Scoring by quarter: 21-26, 16-14, 13-24, 16-20
Pts: Allingu 17; Rebs: Allingu 7 Asts: three players 3		Pts: Ulyanko 19; Rebs: Ulyanko 9 Asts: three players 3

Tartu University Sports Hall, Tartu
Attendance: 1,800
Referees: A. Halliko, T. Suslov, O. Jakobson

May 15
20:00

Report

Kalev/Cramo	87–76 (OT)	UT
Scoring by quarter: 11-20, 22-16, 22-11, 15-23, Overtime: 17-6
Pts: Šķēle 17; Rebs: Fall 16; Asts: three players 3		Pts: Allingu 16; Rebs: Allingu 9 Asts: S. Sokk 5

Saku Suurhall, Tallinn
Attendance: 3,500
Referees: A. Tobi, T. Suslov, R. Peerandi

May 17
20:00

Report

Kalev/Cramo	72–65	UT
Scoring by quarter: 21-16, 9-15, 20-14, 22-20
Pts: Fall 18; Rebs: Fall 19; Asts: three players 3		Pts: Amis 19; Rebs: S. Sokk, Allingu 5 Asts: S. Sokk 6

Saku Suurhall, Tallinn
Attendance: 3,500
Referees: A. Halliko, M. Uuehendrik, R. Rannamets

Korvpalli Meistriliiga 2012 Champions

BC Kalev/Cramo
5th title

== Stats Leaders ==
=== Points ===
Rank	Name	Team	Points	Games	PPG
1.	(Latvia) Reinis Strupovics	Valga/CKE Inkasso	272	13	20.92
2.	(Estonia) Toomas Raadik	KK Pärnu	490	27	18.15
3.	(United States) Brandis Raley-Ross	BC Tallinna Kalev	431	25	17.24
4.	(Estonia) Janar Soo	Piimameister Otto/Rapla	459	27	17.00
5.	(Latvia) Kaspars Cipruss	BC Rakvere Tarvas	435	26	16.73

=== Rebounds ===
Rank	Name	Team	Rebounds	Games	RPG
1.	(Latvia) Kaspars Cipruss	BC Rakvere Tarvas	264	26	10.15
2.	(Russia) Aleksei Fedorchuk	BC Tallinna Kalev	189	23	8.22
3.	(United States) Andrew Arnold	TTÜ KK	205	25	8.20
4.	(Latvia) Lauris Blaus	Valga/CKE Inkasso	90	11	8.18
5.	(Estonia) Toomas Raadik	KK Pärnu	210	27	7.78

=== Assists ===
Rank	Name	Team	Assists	Games	APG
1.	(Estonia) Rait-Riivo Laane	Piimameister Otto/Rapla	111	27	4.11
2.	(Estonia) Sten-Timmu Sokk	University of Tartu	66	17	3.88
3.	(Estonia) Illimar Pilk	TTÜ KK	88	25	3.52
4.	(Estonia) Valmo Kriisa	University of Tartu	96	28	3.43
5.	(Estonia) Martin Dorbek	BC Rakvere Tarvas	88	26	3.38

== Awards ==
=== Regular season MVP ===
- Kaspars Cipruss – BC Rakvere Tarvas

=== Finals MVP ===
- Tanel Sokk – BC Kalev/Cramo

=== All-KML team ===
Position	Player	Team
PG	(Estonia) Tanel Sokk	BC Kalev/Cramo
SG	(Estonia) Janar Soo	Piimameister Otto/Rapla
SF	(Estonia) Gregor Arbet	BC Kalev/Cramo
PF	(United States) Bill Amis	University of Tartu
C	(Latvia) Kaspars Cipruss	BC Rakvere Tarvas

=== Best Coach ===
- Aivar Kuusmaa – BC Kalev/Cramo

=== Best Young Player ===
- Rait-Riivo Laane – Piimameister Otto/Rapla

=== Best Defensive Player ===
- Bamba Fall – BC Kalev/Cramo

=== Player of the month ===
Month	Player	Team	Source
October	(Estonia) Janar Soo	Piimameister Otto/Rapla	
November	(Estonia) Rait-Riivo Laane	Piimameister Otto/Rapla	
December	(Latvia) Kaspars Cipruss	BC Rakvere Tarvas	
January	(Estonia) Toomas Raadik	KK Pärnu	
February	(Estonia) Valmo Kriisa	University of Tartu	
March	(Estonia) Reinar Hallik	BC Rakvere Tarvas	

Last updated: 11 June 2012.
Source: KML

== See also ==
- VTB United League 2011–12
- Baltic Basketball League 2011–12
