= Joosep Toome =

Estonian basketball player and coach

University of Tartu
- Position: Assistant coach

Personal information
- Born: 21 June 1985 (age 41) Tartu, then part of Estonian SSR, Soviet Union
- Listed height: 2.08 m (6 ft 10 in)
- Listed weight: 110 kg (243 lb)

Career information
- NBA draft: 2007: undrafted
- Playing career: 2005–2015
- Coaching career: 2015–present

Career history

Playing
- 2005–2008: Kalev/Cramo
- 2006–2007: → Kalev/Rapla (loan)
- 2008–2010: TTÜ
- 2010–2012: Kalev/Cramo
- 2012–2015: University of Tartu

Coaching
- 2016–2018: Estonia U-16 (assistant)
- 2017–: University of Tartu (assistant)
- 2018–: Estonia U-14 (assistant)

Career highlights
- 4× Estonian League champion (2006, 2011, 2012, 2015)

Joosep Toome (born 21 June 1985) is an Estonian basketball coach and former professional player who is currently an assistant coach for University of Tartu of the Korvpalli Meistriliiga.

Standing at 2.08 m (6 ft 10 in), he played at the center position. He also represented the Estonian national basketball team internationally.

== Professional career ==
Toome began playing basketball with Kalevi Pojad junior team and TTÜ. He began his professional career in 2005 with Kalev of the Korvpalli Meistriliiga. Kalev finished the 2005–06 season winning the Estonian Championship, after a 4–3 series win in the KML finals against University of Tartu.

In 2008, Toome left Kalev and transferred to TTÜ.

In 2010, he returned to Kalev. Toome won two more Estonian Championships in 2011 and 2012, before leaving the club after the 2011–12 season.

In 2012, Toome signed for University of Tartu. He won the 2014–15 Estonian League championship, after University of Tartu defeated his former team Kalev in the finals, winning the series 4–1. On 15 September 2015, it was announced Toome will be requiring knee surgery and will miss the 2015–16 season.

== Estonian national team ==
As a member of the senior Estonian national basketball team, Toome competed at the EuroBasket 2015, averaging 3.4 points, 2 rebounds and 0.6 assists per game, in 12.8 minutes.

== Awards and accomplishments ==
=== Professional career ===
Kalev

- 3× Estonian League champion: 2006, 2011, 2012

University of Tartu

- Estonian League champion: 2015
- Estonian Cup champion: 2013
