= Janar =

Male given name

- Gender: Male
- Language: Estonian

Origin
- Region of origin: Estonia

Janar is an Estonian masculine given name. People bearing the name Janar include:

- Janar Soo (born 1991), Estonian basketball player
- Janar Talts (born 1983), Estonian basketball player
- Janar Toomet (born 1989), Estonian footballer
