= ULEB Cup 2007–08 Regular Season Group G =

These are the Group G Standings and Results:

Key to colors
Top three places in each group, plus five highest-ranked four-places teams, advance to Top 32
Eliminated

== Standings ==
	Team	Pld	W	L	PF	PA	Diff
1.	(Spain) Kalise Gran Canaria	10	8	2	820	752	68
2.	(France) Adecco ASVEL Villeurbanne	10	6	4	864	809	55
3.	(Greece) Panionios Forthnet	10	5	5	822	818	4
4.	(Poland) Asco Śląsk Wrocław	10	5	5	785	760	25
5.	(Germany) Ludwigsburg	10	3	7	811	852	-41
6.	(Estonia) BC Kalev/Cramo	10	3	7	727	838	-111

== Results/Fixtures ==
All times given below are in Central European Time.

=== Game 1 ===
November 6, 2007

November 6
18:00

BC Kalev/Cramo (Estonia)	81–68	(Greece) Panionios Forthnet
Scoring by quarter: 30-12, 13-20, 23-21, 15-15

Tallinn

November 6
19:30

Ludwigsburg (Germany)	72–90	(France) Adecco ASVEL
Scoring by quarter: 25-28, 21-15, 16-25, 10-22

Ludwigsburg

November 6
19:30

ASCO Śląsk (Poland)	71–63	(Spain) Gran Canaria
Scoring by quarter: 25-14, 15-17, 13-16, 18-16

Wrocław

=== Game 2 ===
November 13, 2007

November 13
18:00

Panionios Forthnet (Greece)	72–61	(Poland) ASCO Śląsk
Scoring by quarter: 18-11, 18-16, 17-19, 19-15

Athens

November 13
20:30

Adecco ASVEL (France)	91–95	(Estonia) BC Kalev/Cramo

Villeurbanne

November 13
21:00

Gran Canaria (Spain)	89–73	(Germany) Ludwigsburg
Scoring by quarter: 16-15, 29-20, 19-23, 25-15

Las Palmas

=== Game 3 ===
November 20, 2007

November 20
18:00

BC Kalev/Cramo (Estonia)	67–80	(Spain) Gran Canaria
Scoring by quarter: 12-24, 12-25, 20-19, 23-12

Tallinn

November 20
18:10

Panionios Forthnet (Greece)	91–98 (OT)	(France) Adecco ASVEL
Scoring by quarter: 19-19, 26-24, 17-13, 19-25, 10-17

Athens

November 20
19:30

ASCO Śląsk (Poland)	107–93	(Germany) Ludwigsburg
Scoring by quarter: 22-20, 32-21, 18-28, 35-24

Wrocław

=== Game 4 ===
November 27, 2007

November 27
18:00

BC Kalev/Cramo (Estonia)	92–88	(Germany) Ludwigsburg
Scoring by quarter: 22-21, 23-20, 29-21, 18-26

Tallinn

November 27
19:30

ASCO Śląsk (Poland)	78–65	(France) Adecco ASVEL
Scoring by quarter: 33-17, 9-14, 16-22, 20-12

Wrocław

November 27
21:00

Gran Canaria (Spain)	82–73	(Greece) Panionios Forthnet
Scoring by quarter: 17-17, 26-15, 15-21, 24-20

Las Palmas

=== Game 5 ===
December 4, 2007

December 4
18:00

BC Kalev/Cramo (Estonia)	61–79	(Poland) ASCO Śląsk
Scoring by quarter: 17-23, 10-18, 18-18, 16-20

Tallinn

December 4
20:30

Adecco ASVEL (France)	94–86	(Spain) Gran Canaria
Scoring by quarter: 32-22, 21-23, 24-22, 17-19

Villeurbanne

December 5
20:00

Ludwigsburg (Germany)	77–85	(Greece) Panionios Forthnet
Scoring by quarter: 15-19, 18-27, 14-14, 30-25

Ludwigsburg

=== Game 6 ===
December 11, 2007

December 11
18:00

Panionios Forthnet (Greece)	90–66	(Estonia) BC Kalev/Cramo
Scoring by quarter: 25-15, 27-17, 15-18, 23-16

Athens

December 11
20:30

Adecco ASVEL (France)	81–74	(Germany) Ludwigsburg
Scoring by quarter: 21-19, 18-20, 30-14, 12-21

Villeurbanne

December 11
21:00

Gran Canaria (Spain)	82–71	(Poland) ASCO Śląsk
Scoring by quarter: 17-15, 21-20, 21-21, 23-15

Las Palmas

=== Game 7 ===
December 18, 2007

December 18
18:00

BC Kalev/Cramo (Estonia)	63–91	(France) Adecco ASVEL
Scoring by quarter: 29-23, 12-16, 13-27, 9-25

Tallinn

December 18
19:30

ASCO Śląsk (Poland)	92–94	(Greece) Panionios Forthnet
Scoring by quarter: 22-23, 21-21, 23-22, 26-28

Wrocław

December 18
20:00

Ludwigsburg (Germany)	71–90	(Spain) Gran Canaria
Scoring by quarter: 15-20, 16-20, 20-14, 20-36

Ludwigsburg

=== Game 8 ===
January 8, 2008

January 8
20:00

Ludwigsburg (Germany)	81–70	(Poland) ASCO Śląsk
Scoring by quarter: 21-17, 19-16, 22-16, 19-21

Ludwigsburg

January 8
20:30

Adecco ASVEL (France)	87–89	(Greece) Panionios Forthnet
Scoring by quarter: 28-23, 20-25, 22-20, 17-21

Villeurbanne

January 8
21:00

Gran Canaria (Spain)	80–75	(Estonia) BC Kalev/Cramo
Scoring by quarter: 28-22, 21-15, 13-22, 18-16

Las Palmas

=== Game 9 ===
January 15, 2008

January 15
18:00

Panionios Forthnet (Greece)	74–79	(Spain) Gran Canaria
Scoring by quarter: 17-25, 18-16, 20-13, 19-25

Athens

January 15
20:00

Ludwigsburg (Germany)	87–62	(Estonia) BC Kalev/Cramo
Scoring by quarter: 23-14, 20-19, 25-16, 19-13

Ludwigsburg

January 15
20:30

Adecco ASVEL (France)	84–72	(Poland) ASCO Śląsk
Scoring by quarter: 17-9, 18-26, 32-14, 17-23

Villeurbanne

=== Game 10 ===
January 22, 2008

January 22
20:00

Gran Canaria (Spain)	89–83	(France) Adecco ASVEL
Scoring by quarter: 32-19, 13-21, 28-21, 16-22

Las Palmas

January 22
20:00

ASCO Śląsk (Poland)	84–65	(Estonia) BC Kalev/Cramo
Scoring by quarter: 22-12, 24-20, 15-11, 23-22

Wrocław

January 22
20:00

Panionios Forthnet (Greece)	86–95	(Germany) Ludwigsburg
Scoring by quarter: 23-26, 25-29, 21-24, 17-16

Athens
