= 2004–05 KML season =

Estonian national championships in basketball

SEB Ühispanga Korvpalli Meistriliiga^{1}
- Season: 2004–05
- Duration: 20 October 2004 – 29 May 2005
- Teams: 9

Regular season
- Top seed: Ehitustööriist
- Season MVP: (United States) Howard Frier

Finals
- Champions: Ehitustööriist (1st title)
- Runners-up: TÜ/Rock
- ^{1} Sponsored league name, referring to SEB Ühispank.

The 2004–05 Korvpalli Meistriliiga (KML) season was the 80th season of the premier basketball competition for men's teams in Estonia.

The season began on 20 October 2004 and ended on 29 May 2005, with Ehitustööriist defeating TÜ/Rock four games to three in the KML Finals to win their first Estonian championship.

== Regular season ==
Pos	Team	Pld	W	L	Pts	PCT	Qualification
1	TÜ/Rock	16	12	4	28	.750	Advance to Baltic Basketball League
2	Ehitustööriist	16	12	4	28	.750	Advance to Baltic Basketball League
3	Tallinna Kalev	16	12	4	28	.750	Advance to second round
4	Rakvere PK	16	11	5	27	.688	Advance to second round
5	Dalkia/Nybit	16	9	7	25	.563	Advance to second round
6	Pirita BM	16	8	8	24	.500	Advance to second round
7	BIG/new balance Rapla	16	4	12	20	.250	Advance to second round
8	TTÜ/A. Le Coq	16	3	13	19	.188	Advance to second round
9	Audentese Ülikool	16	1	15	17	.063	Advance to second round

Source: Sport24.ee

== Second round ==
Pos	Team	Pld	W	L	Pts	PCT	Qualification
1	Dalkia/Nybit	24	20	4	44	.833	Advance to playoffs
2	Rakvere PK	24	19	5	43	.792	Advance to playoffs
3	Tallinna Kalev	24	16	8	40	.667	Advance to playoffs
4	Pirita BM	24	11	13	35	.458	Advance to playoffs
5	BIG/new balance Rapla	24	7	17	31	.292	Advance to playoffs
6	TTÜ/A. Le Coq	24	6	18	30	.250	Advance to playoffs
7	Audentese Ülikool	24	5	19	29	.208	

Source: Sport24.ee

== Playoffs ==
Quarterfinals
1	Ehitustööriist	2
8	TTÜ/A. Le Coq	0
4	Rakvere PK	1
5	Tallinna Kalev	2
2	TÜ/Rock	2
7	BIG/new balance Rapla	0
3	Dalkia/Nybit	1
6	Pirita BM	2

Semifinals
1	Ehitustööriist	3
5	Tallinna Kalev	0
2	TÜ/Rock	3
6	Pirita BM	0

Finals
1	Ehitustööriist	4
2	TÜ/Rock	3
Third place
5	Tallinna Kalev	2
6	Pirita BM	1

== Awards ==
=== KML Most Valuable Player ===
- (United States) Howard Frier (Ehitustööriist)

=== KML Coach of the Year ===
- (Estonia) Allan Dorbek (Ehitustööriist)

=== KML Best Young Player ===
- (Estonia) Gert Dorbek (Tallinna Kalev)

=== KML All-Star Five ===
Position	Player	Team
PG	(Spain) Víctor González	Ehitustööriist
SG	(United States) Howard Frier	Ehitustööriist
SF	(Estonia) Marek Doronin	TÜ/Rock
PF	(Estonia) Tarmo Kikerpill	TÜ/Rock
C	(Estonia) Ardo Ärmpalu	Rakvere PK
