= Dorbek =

Dorbek is a surname. Notable people with the surname include:

- Gert Dorbek (born 1985), Estonian basketball player
- Martin Dorbek (born 1991), Estonian basketball player
