= 2008–09 Baltic Basketball League =

Baltic Basketball League 2008–09 was the fifth edition of Baltic Basketball League.

== Teams for the Baltic Basketball League 2008–09 ==
Country	Teams	Teams
Lithuania	4	BC Lietuvos Rytas	BC Žalgiris	Šiauliai	Nevėžis Kedainiai
Latvia	4	ASK Riga	BK Ventspils	Barons LMT	SK Valmiera
Estonia	2	Tartu Ülikool/Rock	BC Kalev/Cramo

== Teams for the Baltic Basketball League Challenge Cup 2008–09 ==
Country	Teams	Teams
Lithuania	7	BC Aisčiai	BC Alytus	Kaunas TRIOBET	KK Neptūnas	BC Sakalai	BC Arvi-Sūduva	BC Techasas
Latvia	5	ASK/Buki	BK Ķeizarmežs	BK Liepājas lauvas	BK VEF Rīga	BK Zemgale
Estonia	3	Tallinna Kalev	TTÜ KK	Valga Welg
Sweden	1	Dolphins Norrköping

== Elite Division ==
=== Regular season standings ===
	Team	W	L	PF	PA	Diff
1	(Lithuania) BC Lietuvos Rytas	14	4	1604	1438	+166
2	(Lithuania) Žalgiris Kaunas	13	5	1465	1329	+136
3	(Estonia) BC Kalev/Cramo	12	6	1420	1331	+ 89
4	(Latvia) ASK Riga	12	6	1429	1369	+ 60
5	(Lithuania) Šiauliai	10	8	1435	1463	– 28
6	(Estonia) Tartu Ülikool/Rock	8	10	1398	1430	– 32
7	(Latvia) BK Ventspils	7	11	1336	1448	−112
8	(Latvia) Barons LMT	7	11	1368	1385	– 17
9	(Latvia) SK Valmiera	5	13	1436	1550	−114
10	(Lithuania) Nevėžis Kedainiai	2	16	1285	1433	−148

==== Quarterfinals ====
ASK Riga vs BC Šiauliai

LTV7

March 24
19:50

Report

ASK Riga (Latvia)	75–76	(Lithuania) BC Šiauliai
Scoring by quarter: 18-13, 17-24, 17-23, 23-16
Pts: Grafs 18; Rebs: Grafs 6 Asts: Vītols 4		Pts: Vileita 14; Rebs: Kuzminskas 7 Asts: Kuzminskas 4
0-1

Arena Riga
Attendance: 1000
Referees: Atso Matsalu
Virginijus Dovidavicius
Juris Kokainis

LTV & LTV7

March 28
16:05

Report

BC Šiauliai (Lithuania)	44–61	(Latvia) ASK Riga
Scoring by quarter: 14-19, 13-12, 10-14, 7-16
Pts: Two players 12; Rebs: Praškevičius 8 Asts: Two players 2		Pts: Kalve 15; Rebs: Grafs 11; Asts: Two players 4
1-1

Šiauliai Arena
Attendance: 3250
Referees: Aare Halliko
Tomas Jasevicius
Oskars Lucis

Viasat Sport Baltic

April 1
19:05

Report

ASK Riga (Latvia)	83–70	(Lithuania) BC Šiauliai
Scoring by quarter: 20-9, 25-15, 18-24, 20-22
Pts: Helmanis 24; Rebs: Kalve 7 Asts: Mažutis 6		Pts: Kadžiulis 20; Rebs: Maceina 10; Asts: Three players 4
2-1

Arena Riga
Attendance: 2500
Referees: Atso Matsalu
Kestutis Pilipauskas
Ingus Baumanis

BC Kalev/Cramo vs Tartu Ülikool/Rock

ETV

March 24
19:05

Report

BC Kalev/Cramo (Estonia)	70–76	(Estonia) Tartu Ülikool/Rock
Scoring by quarter: 15-26, 19-13, 18-22, 18-15
Pts: Linehan 19; Rebs: Linehan 7 Asts: Linehan 5		Pts: Sanikidze 19; Rebs: Talts 9 Asts: Tein 4
0-1

Saku Suurhall
Attendance: 5500
Referees: Kestutis Pilipauskas
Tanel Suslov
Mindaugas Vecerskis

ETV

March 28
16:00

Report

Tartu Ülikool/Rock (Estonia)	56–84	(Estonia) BC Kalev/Cramo
Scoring by quarter: 14-20, 9-29, 21-17, 12-18
Pts: Kullamäe 16; Rebs: Talts 7 Asts: Sokk 2		Pts: Linehan 20; Rebs: Kangur 8 Asts: Fox 5
1-1

Tartu University Sports Hall
Attendance: 3000
Referees: Olegs Latisevs
Andres Tobi
Ingus Baumanis

ETV

April 1
18:50

Report

BC Kalev/Cramo (Estonia)	68–71 (OT)	(Estonia) Tartu Ülikool/Rock
Scoring by quarter: 13-19, 12-14, 26-12, 8-14, Overtime: 9-12
Pts: Linehan 15; Rebs: Kangur 13; Asts: Fox 3		Pts: Beard 17; Rebs: Beard 11; Asts: Tsintsadze 7
1-2

Saku Suurhall
Attendance: 6000
Referees: Juris Kokainis
Martynas Gudas
Jurgis Laurinavicius

==== Semifinals ====
LTV7 & LTV

April 24
16:30

Report

BC Lietuvos Rytas (Lithuania)	85–76	(Latvia) ASK Riga
Scoring by quarter: 22-12, 28-21, 19-23, 16-20
Pts: Bjelica 19; Rebs: Petravičius 8 Asts: Lukauskis 4		Pts: Kalve 22; Rebs: Kalve 9 Asts: Runkauskas 3

Tartu University Sports Hall
Attendance: 3000
Referees: Kestutis Pilipauskas
Juris Kokainis
Aare Halliko

ETV

April 24
19:00

Report

BC Žalgiris (Lithuania)	83–74	(Estonia) Tartu Ülikool/Rock
Scoring by quarter: 19-28, 25-16, 19-17, 20-13
Pts: Šalenga 22; Rebs: Jankūnas 8 Asts: Two players 3		Pts: Beard 20; Rebs: Two players 6 Asts: Two players 4

Tartu University Sports Hall
Attendance: 4000
Referees: Atso Matsalu
Virginijus Dovidavicius
Olegs Latisevs

==== Third place game ====
ETV & LTV7

April 25
16:00

Report

ASK Riga (Latvia)	68–77	(Estonia) Tartu Ülikool/Rock
Scoring by quarter: 29-11, 10-26, 11-19, 18-21
Pts: Kalve 15; Rebs: Grafs 11; Asts: Helmanis 2		Pts: Beard 20; Rebs: Sanikidze 11; Asts: Tsintsadze 6

Tartu University Sports Hall
Attendance: 3000
Referees: Kestutis Pilipauskas
Juris Kokainis
Aare Halliko

==== Final ====
LTV & LTV7 & ETV2

April 25
18:30

Report

BC Lietuvos Rytas (Lithuania)	97–74	(Lithuania) BC Žalgiris
Scoring by quarter: 26-25, 26-24, 22-6, 23-19
Pts: Eidson 41; Rebs: Eidson 8 Asts: Eidson 8		Pts: Šalenga 26; Rebs: Klimavičius 9 Asts: Two players 3

Tartu University Sports Hall
Attendance: 2500
Referees: Atso Matsalu
Virginijus Dovidavicius
Olegs Latisevs

=== Bracket ===
Quarter-finals
(Lithuania) BC Lietuvos Rytas	-
-
(Latvia) ASK Riga	2
(Lithuania) Šiauliai	1
(Estonia) Tartu Ülikool/Rock	2
(Estonia) BC Kalev/Cramo	1
(Lithuania) Žalgiris Kaunas	-
-

Semi-finals
(Lithuania) BC Lietuvos Rytas	85
(Latvia) ASK Riga	76
(Estonia) Tartu Ülikool/Rock	74
(Lithuania) Žalgiris Kaunas	83

Final
(Lithuania) BC Lietuvos Rytas	97
(Lithuania) Žalgiris Kaunas	74
Third place
(Latvia) ASK Riga	68
(Estonia) Tartu Ülikool/Rock	77
