= Damian Forrest =

American basketball player

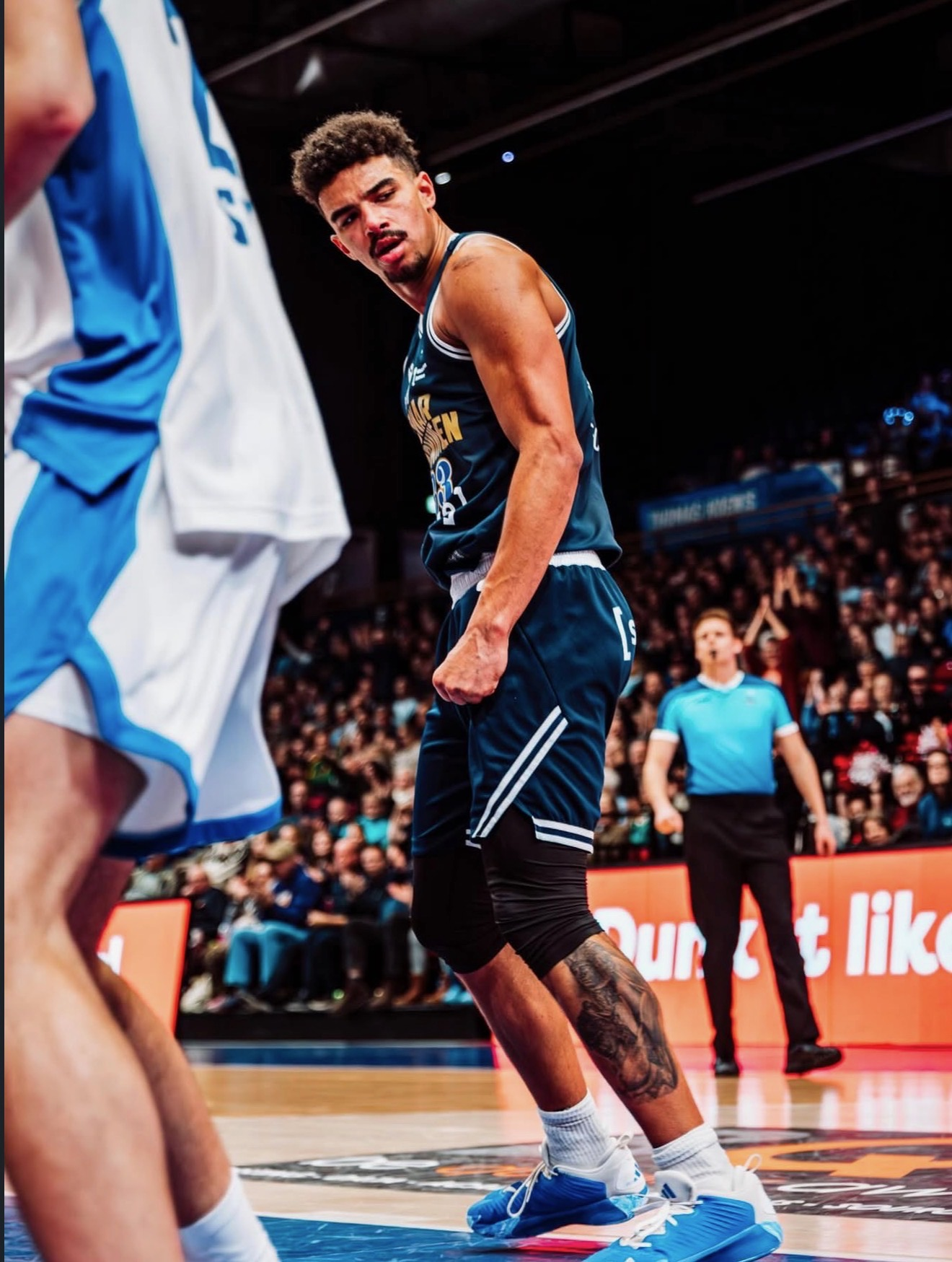
- Forrest playing for Donar in 2026

No. 33 – BC Kalev
- Position: Center
- League: Korvpalli Meistriliiga; Latvian–Estonian Basketball League; Europe Cup

Personal information
- Born: June 15, 2001 (age 25) Fort Collins, Colorado, U.S.
- Listed height: 6 ft 9 in (2.06 m)

Career information
- College: North Alabama (2021–2024)
- Playing career: 2024–present

Career history
- 2024–2025: Nürnberg Falcons
- 2025–2026: Donar
- 2026–present: BC Kalev

Career highlights
- Dutch Cup winner (2026); Dutch Cup finals MVP (2026)

Damian Forrest (born June 15, 2001) is an American professional basketball player for BC Kalev in the Korvpalli Meistriliiga, Latvian–Estonian Basketball League and the Europe Cup.

== Professional career ==
Forrest started his professional career with the Nürnberg Falcons, playing in the German ProA. He scored an average of 9,1 points and 5,1 rebounds. The Falcons ended on the 14th place that year.

In 2025 he accepted an offer from Donar Groningen, which plays in the BNXT League and in the European competition the ENBL. With Donar he won the Dutch Cup, achieving the first prize of his career. During the cup final, his performance of 30 points and 9 rebounds earned him the Finals MVP reward.

On 31 July, Forrest signed with BC Kalev of the Korvpalli Meistriliiga and Latvian–Estonian Basketball League. The club also qualified for the group stage of the Europe Cup
