= Brett Nõmm =

Estonian professional basketball coach (born 1994)

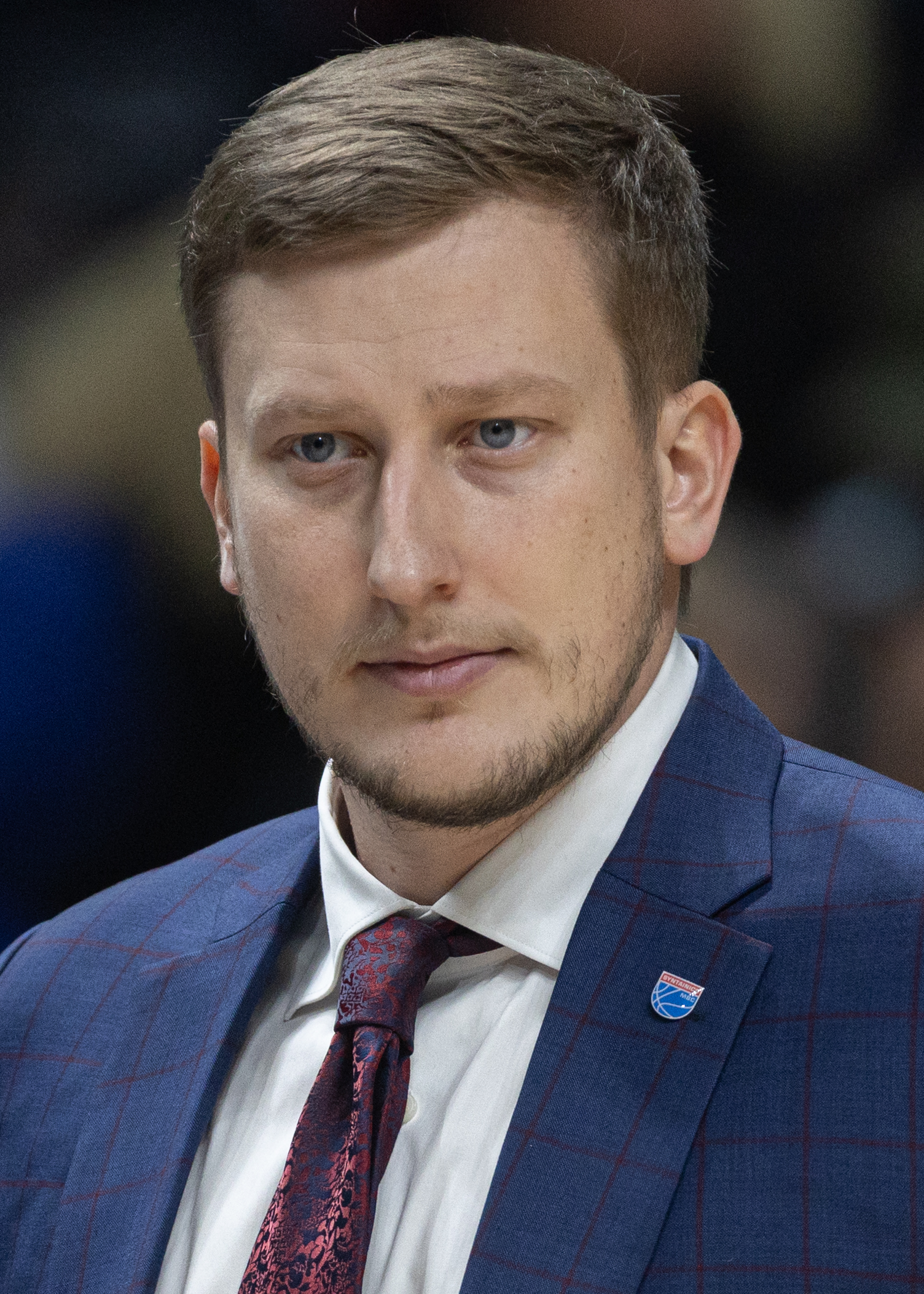

BC Kalev
- Position: Head coach
- League: Korvpalli Meistriliiga; Estonian-Latvian Basketball League

Personal information
- Born: 28 April 1994 (age 32) Jõgeva, Estonia
- Coaching career: 2018–present

Career history

Playing
- 2014–2015: Pärnu

Coaching
- 2018–2021: Tallinna Kalev (assistant)
- 2021–2022: Tallinna Kalev
- 2022–2023: Kalev (assistant)
- 2023–2025: Rapla
- 2024–2025: Estonia (assistant)
- 2025: Kalev (assistant)
- 2025–2026: Mitteldeutscher BC (assistant)
- 2026–present: Kalev
- 2026–present: Estonia (assistant)

Career highlights
- As assistant coach: Estonian League champion (2023)
Medals
Men's basketball
Head Coach for Estonia
FIBA Europe U-16 Championship Division B
Gold medal – first place	2024 North Macedonia	U16 Team

Brett Nõmm (born 28 April 1994) is an Estonian professional basketball coach and former player who currently serves as head coach for BC Kalev of the Korvpalli Meistriliiga and Estonian-Latvian Basketball League and as assistant coach for Estonian national team.

== Coaching career ==
Brett Nõmm started his coaching career in 2018 at Tallinna Kalev as an assistant coach when he took part of the Estonian Basketball Association program. For 2021–22 season he became the head coach for Tallinna Kalev.

For the next season he moved to Kalev/Cramo where he was assistant coach from 2022 to 2023. At the end of 2023 he went to AVIS UTILITAS Rapla where he became head coach. After moving to Rapla, he led Rapla to third place in two consecutive Estonian basketball seasons in 2024 and 2025. For the 2025/26 season Nõmm rejoined Kalev, but on 4 October 2025 it was announced that he will leave the club.

After leaving Kalev, Brett joined the German club Mitteldeutscher BC of the Basketball Bundesliga as an assistant coach.

=== Estonian national team ===
Brett Nõmm was head coach for Estonian U16 team and won gold medal at the 2024 FIBA U16 EuroBasket Division B tournament.

When Heiko Rannula became the head coach for Estonia men's national basketball team, then Brett was hired as an assistant coach for Estonia next to Indrek Reinbok. Nõmm represented Estonian national team at the EuroBasket 2025.

== Personal life ==
His half brother is Alar Varrak who is also a professional basketball coach.
