= 2010–11 KML season =

Estonian national championships in basketball

- League: Korvpalli Meistriliiga
- Sport: Basketball
- Teams: 9

Regular season
- Top seed: Kalev/Cramo

Finals
- Champions: Kalev/Cramo
- Runners-up: TÜ/Rock
- Finals MVP: (Latvia) Armands Šķēle

KML seasons
- ← 2009–10 2011–12 →

The 2010–11 KML season was the 87th season of top-tier basketball in Estonia. It is sponsored by G4S and thus officially known as the G4S Korvpalli Meistriliiga. Defending champions were TÜ/Rock.

== Team information ==
Team	Location	Stadium	Capacity	Head coach
Kalev/Cramo	Tallinn	Saku Suurhall	7,200	(Estonia) Aivar Kuusmaa
Rakvere Tarvas	Rakvere	Rakvere Spordihall	2,422	(Estonia) Andres Sõber
Pärnu	Pärnu	Pärnu Spordihall	2,000	(Estonia) Rait Käbin
Piimameister Otto/Rapla	Rapla	Sadolin Spordihoone	1,000	(Estonia) Indrek Ruut
TTÜ/Kalev	Tallinn	TTÜ Spordihoone	1,050	(Estonia) Üllar Kerde
TTÜ/Kalev II	Tallinn	TTÜ Spordihoone	1,050	(Estonia) Indrek Reinbok
TÜ/Rock	Tartu	TÜ Spordihoone	4,000	(Estonia) Indrek Visnapuu
Valga/CKE Inkasso	Valga	Valga Spordihoone	1,000	(Estonia) Andrus Renter
Võru	Võru	Võru Sports Centre		(Estonia) Teet Laur

== Regular season ==
Rank	Team	MP	W	L	PF	PA	PCT	Qualification
1.	Kalev/Cramo	32	29	3	2800	2236	.906	Qualified for Champion Playoffs
2.	TÜ/Rock	32	28	4	2912	2218	.875	Qualified for Champion Playoffs
3.	TTÜ/Kalev	32	25	7	2853	2408	.781	Qualified for Champion Playoffs
4.	Rakvere Tarvas	32	16	16	2678	2637	.500	Qualified for Champion Playoffs
5.	Valga/CKE Inkasso	32	14	18	2519	2642	.438	Qualified for Champion Playoffs
6.	Piimameister Otto/Rapla	32	13	19	2463	2622	.406	Qualified for Champion Playoffs
7.	TTÜ/Kalev II	32	10	22	2416	2637	.313	
8.	Pärnu	32	8	24	2423	2853	.250	
9.	Võru	32	1	31	2163	2974	.031	

Source: 2010/2011 Alexela Korvpalli Meistriliiga põhiturniir (in Estonian)

== Play-offs ==
Quarterfinals
4	Rakvere Tarvas	3
5	Valga/CKE Inkasso	1
3	TTÜ/Kalev	3
6	Piimameister Otto/Rapla	1

Semifinals
1	Kalev/Cramo	3
4	Rakvere Tarvas	0
2	TÜ/Rock	3
3	TTÜ/Kalev	0

Finals
1	Kalev/Cramo	4
2	TÜ/Rock	0
Third place
3	TTÜ/Kalev	2
4	Rakvere Tarvas	1

== Awards ==
=== Finals MVP ===
- (Latvia) Armands Šķēle – Kalev/Cramo

=== Best Young Player ===
- (Estonia) Rain Veideman – TÜ/Rock

=== Coach of the Year ===
- (Estonia) Aivar Kuusmaa – Kalev/Cramo

=== All-KML team ===
Pos	Player	Team
PG	(Estonia) Sten Sokk	TÜ/Rock
SG	(Latvia) Armands Šķēle	Kalev/Cramo
SF	(Estonia) Gregor Arbet	Kalev/Cramo
PF	(Estonia) Heigo Erm	Piimameister Otto/Rapla
C	(United States) Bambale Osby	TTÜ/Kalev
