= Kuuba =

Kuuba is an Estonian surname meaning "Cuba". Notable people with the surname include:

- Gregor Kuuba (born 2003), Estonian basketball player
- Kristin Kuuba (born 1997), Estonian badminton player
