= Reinar Hallik =

Estonian basketball player

Personal information
- Born: 5 January 1984 (age 42) Narva, then part of Estonian SSR, Soviet Union
- Listed height: 2.08 m (6 ft 10 in)
- Listed weight: 105 kg (231 lb)

Career information
- NBA draft: 2006: undrafted
- Playing career: 2001–2017
- Position: Power forward / center

Career history
- 2001–2002: Hotronic
- 2001–2003: Audentes
- 2003–2004: Tallinna Kalev
- 2004–2005: Myleasecar Giants
- 2005: Audentes
- 2005–2006: Dalkia/Nybit
- 2006: → Rakvere
- 2006: Rakvere Tarvas
- 2006–2007: Sallén Basket
- 2007–2008: LrNMKY
- 2008–2009: Valga
- 2009–2010: Rakvere Tarvas
- 2010–2011: USAP Basket
- 2011–2012: Rakvere Tarvas
- 2012: U-Mobitelco Cluj
- 2013–2014: Universitatea Craiova
- 2014: Oradea
- 2014–2015: Kalev/Cramo
- 2015: → Rakvere Tarvas
- 2015–2016: Falco Szombathely
- 2016: University of Tartu
- 2016–2017: Pärnu

Career highlights
- Finnish Cup champion (2007); Romanian Liga Națională runner-up: 2014 (CSM Oradea); Baltic Basketball League runner-up: 2016 (Tartu Ülikool/Rock); Estonian league silver: 2010 (Rakvere Tarvas); Estonian league bronze: 2012 (Rakvere Tarvas)

Reinar Hallik (born 5 January 1984) is an Estonian retired professional basketball player. Standing at 2.08 m (6 ft 10 in), he played at the power forward position.

Hallik represented the Estonian national basketball team internationally since 2012.

== Professional career ==
Hallik began his professional career in 2001 with Hotronic of the Korvpalli Meistriliiga. In the next season, he played for Audentes.

In 2003, Hallik signed for Estonian champions Tallinna Kalev.

In 2004, Hallik joined Myleasecar Giants of the Dutch Basketball League. In January 2005, he returned to Estonia and rejoined Audentes.

In 2005, Hallik joined Dalkia/Nybit. In January 2006, he was loaned to Rakvere. In the 2005–06 season, Hallik averaged 7.1 points and 5.1 rebounds per game.

In July 2006, Hallik signed for Sallén Basket of the Swedish Basketligan, but spent most of the preseason with Rakvere Tarvas, helping the club in Estonian Cup games, before joining the Swedish club in October.

In June 2007, Hallik joined Finnish Korisliiga champions LrNMKY. On 9 December 2007, he won the Finnish Cup. On 29 January 2008, he left LrNMKY and returned to Estonia. On 6 February 2008, he signed for Valga Welg.

In 2009, Hallik signed for Rakvere Tarvas. In the 2009–10 season, Hallik averaged 11.7 points and 4.9 rebounds per game. Rakvere Tarvas finished the regular season in second place and reached the finals in the playoffs, but lost the series to University of Tartu 2–4.

On 28 June 2010, Hallik joined French Nationale 2 club USAP Basket.

Hallik returned to Rakvere Tarvas for the 2011–12 season. Rakvere Tarvas finished the season in third place, while Hallik averaged 14.4 points and 6 rebounds per game.

On 15 August 2012, Hallik signed for U-Mobitelco Cluj of the Romanian Liga Națională. On 1 January 2013, he left the club and joined Universitatea Craiova.

On 6 February 2014, Hallik signed with Oradea. Oradea finished the 2013–14 season as runners-up, losing to Asesoft Ploiești 2–3 in the finals.

On 20 August 2014, Hallik signed with Estonian champions Kalev/Cramo. On 20 January 2015, he was loaned to Rakvere Tarvas for the remainder of the 2014–15 season.

On 20 September 2015, Hallik signed with Falco Szombathely of the Hungarian Nemzeti Bajnokság I/A. In February 2016, he left the club and returned to Estonia, where he signed for Estonian champions University of Tartu for the remainder of the 2015–16 season. University of Tartu failed to defend the title, losing to Kalev/Cramo in the finals.

On 4 July 2016, Hallik joined Pärnu. He retired from professional basketball after the 2016–17 season.

== Estonian national team ==
Member of U14, U16, U18, U20 youth boys Estonian national team. As a member of the senior (76 official games) Estonian national basketball team, Hallik competed at the EuroBasket 2015, Despite the limited playing time, Hallik has been a fan favorite because of his likable character and streaky three-point shooting. During his tenure with the national team, Estonian supporters chanted on many occasions for Hallik to be substituted in when he was on the bench.

== Post-playing career ==
In 2017, Hallik founded Reinar Halliku Korvpallikool, aiming to support the integration of Estonian- and Russian-speaking youth through sport. In 2022 the club won U16 Boys championship. In 2023 the club finished in EYBL U16 Boys 4th. In 2023 the club won silver medal in U16 boys championship. In 2024 the club won bronze medal in U17 Boys EYBL. In 2024 the club won U19 Boys championship. in 2025 the club won silver medal in Estonian 2nd league. (Saku II liiga) In 2025 the club won silver medal in U19 boys championship. In 2025, the club won the Estonian First League (Saku I esiliiga), earning sporting rights to play in the top division the following season.

== Awards and accomplishments ==
- Finnish Cup champion: 2017 (Lappeenranta NMKY)
- Romanian Liga Națională runner-up: 2014 (CSM Oradea)
- Baltic Basketball League runner-up: 2016 (Tartu Ülikool/Rock)
- Estonian league silver: 2010 (Rakvere Tarvas)
- Estonian league bronze: 2012 (Rakvere Tarvas)
- Ida-Viru Kultuurkapital annual prize: 2020 (for dedication to basketball development)
