= Howard Frier =

American-Estonian basketball player

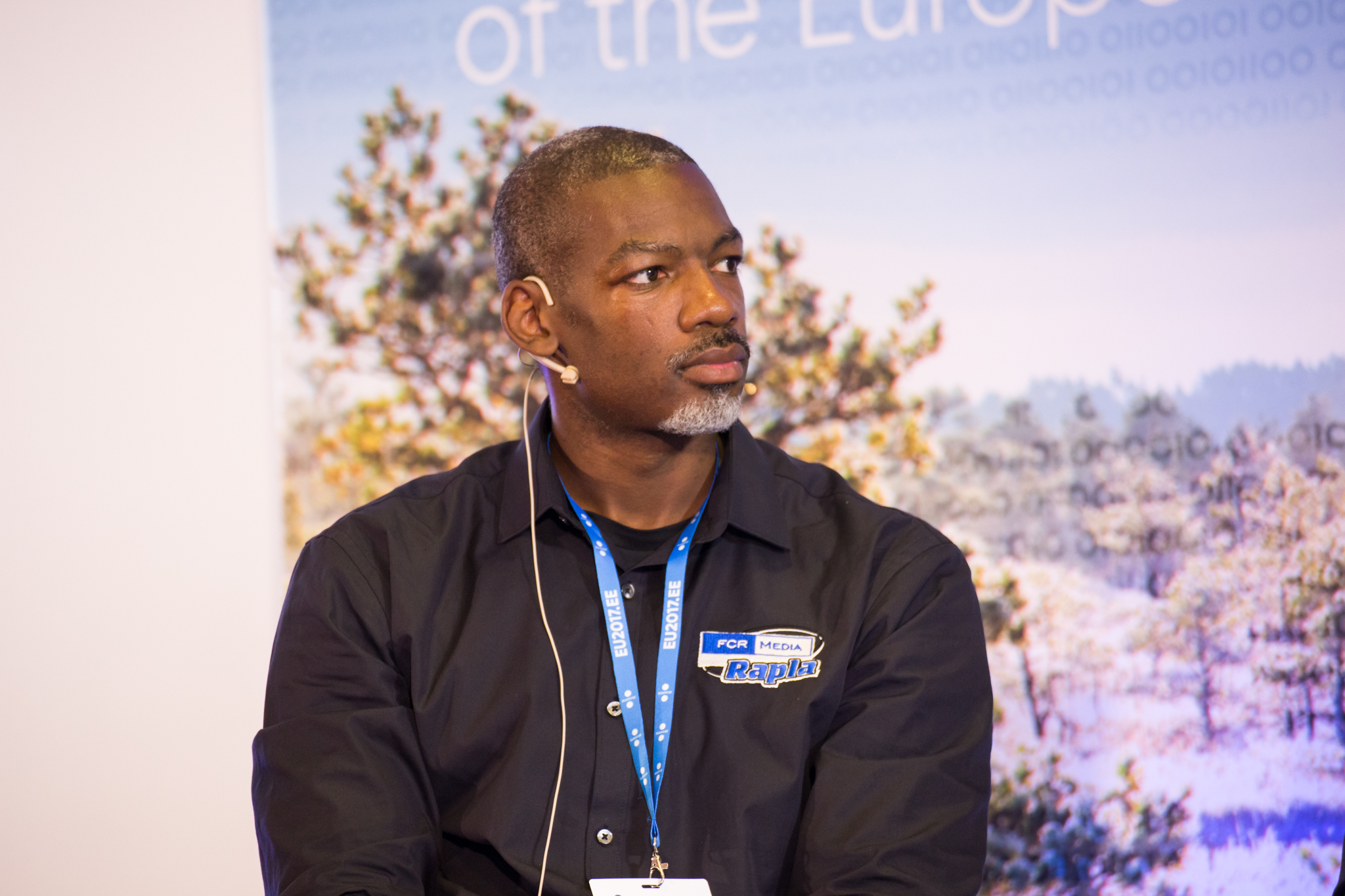
- Frier in 2017

Personal information
- Born: March 31, 1976 (age 50) Suffolk, Virginia, U.S.
- Listed height: 6 ft 3 in (1.91 m)
- Listed weight: 188 lb (85 kg)

Career information
- High school: Nansemond River (Suffolk, Virginia)
- College: Colorado (1994–1998)
- NBA draft: 1998: undrafted
- Playing career: 1998–2011
- Position: Point guard / shooting guard
- Number: 7

Career history
- 1998–2000: Rochester Skeeters
- 2000–2001: Wardieh Rosaire
- 2001: Fargo-Moorhead Beez
- 2001–2004: Oberwaltersdorf
- 2004–2006: BC Kalev
- 2006–2007: Ockelbo BBK
- 2007: Polpak Swiecie
- 2007: BC Kraft Mööbel
- 2007–2008: BC Kalev
- 2009: Tampereen Pyrintö
- 2009: Górnik Wałbrzych
- 2009–2010: Uppsala Basket
- 2010–2011: BC Rakvere Tarvas

Career highlights
- KML MVP (2005); KML Finals MVP (2005)

Howard Fletcher Frier (born March 31, 1976) is an American-Estonian former basketball player.

Howard played college basketball for the Colorado Buffaloes averaging 4.5 points and 3.8 rebounds in his senior year. After graduating he played two seasons in the International Basketball Association League for Rochester Skeeters. After that he shortly played for Wardich Rosaire in Lebanon and Fargo-Moorhead Beez in IBA League.

Frier's European career started in Austria, where he played three seasons for Oberwaltersdorf basketball club. In 2004 Frier signed a deal with Estonian top team BC Kalev/Cramo. He instantly became a lead player and one of the top performers in the team. His excellent performances in the KML finals helped Kalev beat Tartu Ülikool/Rock with the games 4–3 and bring the team's first Estonian League title and season MVP title to Howard. He averaged 13.9 points and 3 rebounds in the play-offs. Frier stayed with Kalev and in 2005–2006 season he helped the team to win a second consecutive Estonian championship averaging 12.9 points and 4.1 rebounds in the play-offs.

Howard then went to Sweden to play for Ockelbo BBK, he also shortly played in Poland and then returned to Estonia. He started the season with BC Kraft Mööbel and his good performances caught Kalev/Cramo's attention. The Kalev fans gave a warm welcome to the former team star. In 2009 January he played one game for Tampereen Pyrintö in Finland and then signed with Górnik Wałbrzych in Poland.

== Achievements ==
- Estonian National Championship: 2004–05, 2005–06
  - Runner-up: 2007–08
- Estonian League MVP 2004–05
- Estonian League Finals MVP 2004–05
