= Kristjan Makke =

Estonian basketball player

Personal information
- Born: March 12, 1981 (age 45) Kohtla-Järve, then part of Estonian SSR, Soviet Union
- Listed height: 6 ft 9 in (2.06 m)
- Listed weight: 237 lb (108 kg)

Career information
- High school: Quincy (Quincy, Illinois)
- College: Western Illinois (1999–2001)
- Playing career: 1996–present
- Position: Center; Power forward

Career history
- 1996–1998: KK Kalev
- 2001–2004: BC Kalev / Ehitustööriist
- 2004–2005: Audentese Ülikool
- 2005–2008: Nybit

Kristjan Makke (born March 12, 1981, in Kohtla-Järve) is an Estonian professional basketballer. He is currently playing for TTÜ KK at the center/forward position. Makke started his senior club career at the age of fifteen with "BC Kalev" in 1996. After that he attended high school and college in the United States. In 2001, he moved to Tallinna Kalev. He played there until December 2002 and then moved to Ehitustööriist where he spent the next season also. In 2004–05 Makke played for Audentese Ülikool and then signed with Nybit. After three seasons in the team Makke joined TTÜ KK. He is currently the captain of the team.

Kristjan Makke is also a member of the Estonia national basketball team and has been a member of the Estonian EuroBasket squad in 2003, 2007, and 2009.

== Honours ==
- 1997–98 Estonian League (BC Kalev)
- 2001–02 Estonian Cup (Tallinna Kalev)
- 2001–02 Estonian League (Tallinna Kalev)
