= Nate Fox =

American basketball player

Personal information
- Born: April 14, 1977 Plainfield, Illinois, U.S.
- Died: December 22, 2014 (aged 37) Bloomingdale, Illinois, U.S.
- Listed height: 6 ft 9 in (2.06 m)
- Listed weight: 230 lb (104 kg)

Career information
- High school: Plainfield (Plainfield, Illinois)
- College: Boston College (1995–1997); Maine (1998–2000)
- NBA draft: 2000: undrafted
- Playing career: 2000–2012
- Position: Power forward / center

Career history
- 2000–2001: Aveiro Esgueira
- 2001: CB Ciudad de Huelva
- 2001: Aveiro Esgueira
- 2001–2002: Barreirense
- 2002–2003: Bayer Giants Leverkusen
- 2003–2004: Ramat Hasharon
- 2004: Basket Groot Leuven
- 2004: MPC Capitals
- 2005–2008: Bayer Giants Leverkusen
- 2008–2009: BC Kalev
- 2009–2010: NY Phantoms Braunschweig
- 2011: STB Le Havre
- 2011–2012: Okapi Aalstar

Career highlights
- All-KML First Team (2009); First-team All-America East (2000)

Nate Fox (April 14, 1977 – December 22, 2014) was an American professional basketball player.

Fox played college basketball for the University of Maine Black Bears, averaging 17.5 points and 7.5 rebounds in his senior year.

After graduating, he played in Europe. From 2000 until 2002 he played in Portugal before signing with Bayer Giants Leverkusen in Germany. For the next two seasons Fox played in Israel, Belgium and The Netherlands. In 2005, he returned to Bayer Giants Leverkusen and became one of the best players in Basketball Bundesliga and a leader at his team. In March 2008 he received a worldwide suspension for seven and a half months after a positive doping test and was fired from Leverkusen. After the suspension ended Fox signed with BC Kalev/Cramo. Fox was one of the best players in the Baltic League and he received the Baltic Basketball League MVP of the Month award in December 2008. For the 2009–10 season Fox moved back to Bundesliga basketball, playing for the New Yorker Phantoms Braunschweig. In February 2011 he signed with French club STB Le Havre.

== Death ==
Fox was shot to death shortly after 9:30 p.m on December 22, 2014, in the driveway of his Bloomingdale, Illinois, home. The shooter was Hinsdale, Illinois, businessman Jeffrey Wayne Keller, who was convicted on May 26, 2017, of first-degree murder for the killing.

== Achievements ==
- 2008–09 Estonian Cup (BC Kalev/Cramo)
- 2008–09 Estonian League (BC Kalev/Cramo)
- 2011–12 Belgian Cup (Okapi Aalstar)
