= Rait-Riivo Laane =

Estonian basketball player

No. 4 – Keila Basket
- Position: Point guard
- League: Korvpalli Meistriliiga; Estonian-Latvian Basketball League

Personal information
- Born: 24 May 1993 (age 33) Kohila, Estonia
- Listed height: 1.79 m (5 ft 10 in)
- Listed weight: 75 kg (165 lb)

Career information
- NBA draft: 2015: undrafted
- Playing career: 2008–present

Career history
- 2008–2012: Kohila
- 2010–2015: Rapla KK
- 2012–2013: → Rapla II
- 2015–2016: TTÜ
- 2016–2018: Ethnikos Piraeus
- 2018–2019: Ippokratis Kos
- 2019–2020: Rapla
- 2020–2021: CSM Miercurea Ciuc
- 2021–2022: Viimsi
- 2022–2025: Rapla KK
- 2025–2026: Academic Plovdiv
- 2026: Tartu Ülikool
- 2026–present: Keila Basket

Career highlights
- Estonian League champion (2026); 2× KML Best Young Player (2012–2013)

Rait-Riivo Laane (born 24 May 1993) is an Estonian professional basketball player for Keila Basket of the Korvpalli Meistriliiga and Latvian-Estonian Basketball League. He is a 1.79 m (5 ft 10 in) tall point guard. He also represents the Estonian national basketball team internationally.

== Awards and accomplishments ==
=== Individual ===
- 2× KML Best Young Player: 2012, 2013
