= Gert Dorbek =

Estonian retired basketball player

Personal information
- Born: 10 June 1985 (age 41) Tallinn, then part of Estonian SSR, Soviet Union
- Listed height: 1.93 m (6 ft 4 in)
- Listed weight: 93 kg (205 lb)

Career information
- NBA draft: 2007: undrafted
- Playing career: 2002–2018
- Position: Shooting guard

Career history
- 2002–2003: Nybit
- 2003–2004: TTÜ/A. Le Coq
- 2004–2005: Tallinna Kalev
- 2005–2006: BC Kalev
- 2006–2008: Triobet/Dalkia
- 2008: Tallinna Kalev
- 2008–2009: Ferro-ZNTU
- 2009: Tallinna Kalev
- 2009–2013: BC Kalev
- 2013–2017: Tartu Ülikool
- 2017–2018: Rapla

Career highlights
- 5× KML champion (2006, 2011–2013, 2015); KML Best Young Player (2005)

Gert Dorbek (born 10 June 1985) is an Estonian retired basketball player. He is a 1.93 m (6 ft 4 in) tall shooting guard. He has also represented the Estonian national basketball team internationally.

== Professional career ==
Dorbek began playing basketball in Tiit Sokk's basketball school. He began his professional career in 2002 with Nybit of the Korvpalli Meistriliiga (KML).

In 2003, Dorbek signed for TTÜ/A. Le Coq. TTÜ/A. Le Coq finished the 2003–04 season in third place. After the season, the club dissolved due to financial and ownership struggles.

In 2004, Dorbek joined Tallinna Kalev. The team finished the 2004–05 season in third place. Dorbek averaged 16.11 points per game and was named KML Best Young Player. After the season, Kalev too was hit by financial problems and dissolved.

In 2005, Dorbek signed for the Estonian champions Kalev/Cramo. He won his first Estonian Championship in the 2005–06 season.

In 2006, Dorbek returned to Dalkia/Nybit. The team changed its name to Triobet/Dalkia in 2007 and dissolved in 2008.

On 1 October 2008, Dorbek joined Tallinna Kalev (former Pirita), but left the club in November to join Ferro-ZNTU of the Ukrainian Basketball League. Ferro-ZNTU terminated his contract on 25 March 2009 and Dorbek returned to Tallinna Kalev.

In 2009, Dorbek returned to Kalev/Cramo. With Kalev/Cramo, he won the three consecutive Estonian Championships in 2011, 2012 and 2013.

On 15 August 2013, Dorbek signed with University of Tartu. He won his fifth Estonian Championship in the 2014–15 season, after University of Tartu defeated his former team Kalev/Cramo in the finals, winning the series 4 games to 1.

On 22 August 2017, Dorbek signed with Rapla.

== Estonian national team ==
As a member of the senior Estonian national basketball team, Dorbek competed at the EuroBasket 2015, averaging 2 rebounds per game, in 4.5 minutes. Estonia finished the tournament in 20th place.

== Personal life ==
Dorbek's uncle, Aivar Kuusmaa, is a basketball coach and a retired professional basketball player. He is also a distant cousin of basketball coach Allan Dorbek and his sons Karl-Peeter, Erik and Martin Dorbek.

== Awards and accomplishments ==
=== Professional career ===
TTÜ/A. Le Coq

- Estonian Cup champion: 2003

Kalev/Cramo

- 4× Estonian League champion: 2006, 2011, 2012, 2013
- Estonian Cup champion: 2005

TÜ/Rock

- Estonian League champion: 2015
- 2× Estonian Cup champion: 2013, 2014

=== Individual ===
- KML Best Young Player: 2005
