= Janar Soo =

Estonian basketball player

Personal information
- Born: January 17, 1991 (age 35) Kohila, Estonia
- Listed height: 6 ft 6 in (1.98 m)
- Listed weight: 205 lb (93 kg)

Career information
- Playing career: 2008–2017
- Position: Shooting guard

Career history
- 2008–2009: Pärnu
- 2010–2015: Rapla
- 2015–2016: BC Kalev
- 2016–2017: Tartu Ülikool
Medals
Representing Estonia
Men's basketball
FIBA U20 European Championship
Silver medal – second place	2011 Bosnia and Herzegovina	National team

Janar Soo (born 17 January 1991) is a former Estonian professional basketball player who played at the shooting guard position. He retired in January 2017 due to knee injuries.

== Estonian national team ==
Soo has represented the Estonia men's national basketball team in 2015.
