= Valga Sports Hall =

Sports hall in Estonia

Valga Spordihoone
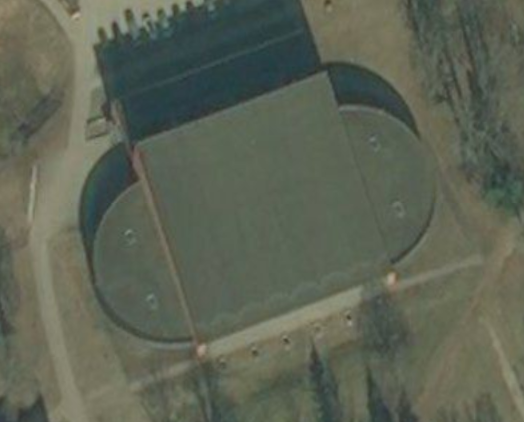
- Interactive map of Valga Spordihoone
- Location: Kungla 31, Valga, Estonia
- Coordinates: 57°46′43.78″N 26°3′0.16″E
- Owner: SA Valga Sport
- Operator: SA Valga Sport
- Capacity: Basketball: 561

Construction
- Opened: 2005

Tenant
- BC Valga (KML) (2005–present)

Website
- Official website

The Valga Sports Hall (Estonian: Valga Spordihoone) is a multi-purpose indoor arena complex in Valga. It was opened in 2005 and is the current home arena of the Estonian Basketball League team BC Valga.
