= Armands Šķēle =

Latvian basketball player (born 1983)

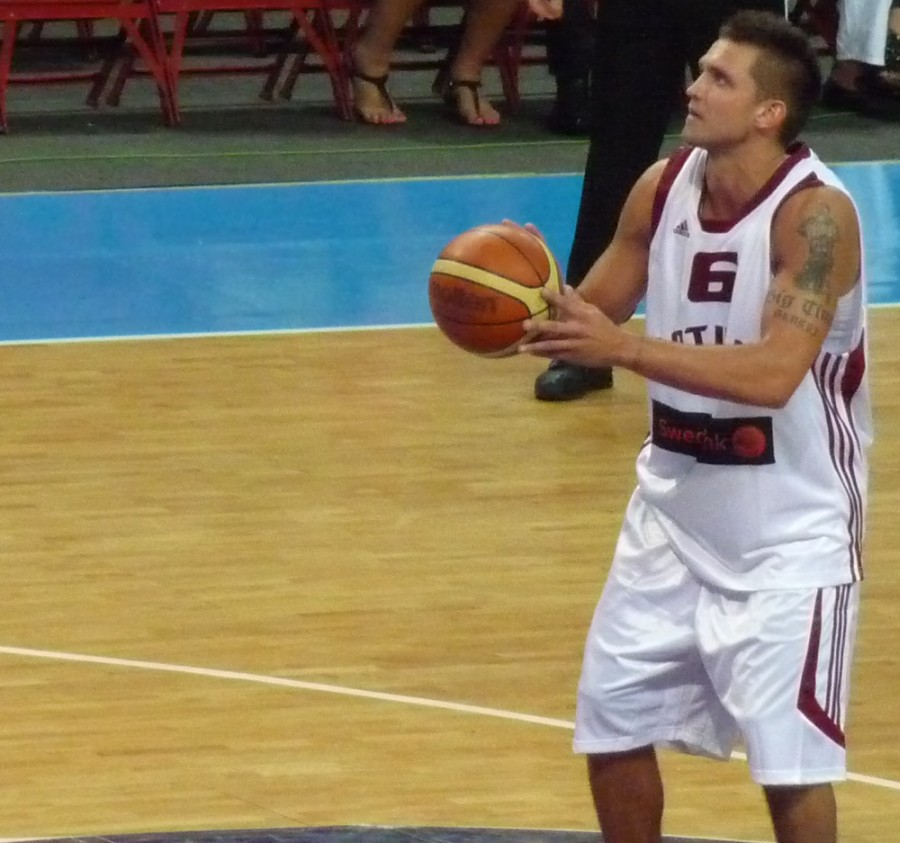
- Armands Šķēle in 2009

Personal information
- Born: 4 September 1983 (age 43) Riga, Latvia
- Listed height: 6 ft 3 1/2 in (1.92 m)
- Listed weight: 200 lb (91 kg)

Career information
- Playing career: 1999–2017
- Position: Shooting guard
- Number: 22

Career history
- 1999–2001: BK Brocēni
- 2001–2004: Anwil Włocławek
- 2004–2005: Liège Basket
- 2005–2006: Spirou Charleroi
- 2006–2009: Barons LMT
- 2009: Basket Napoli
- 2010: BK Ventspils
- 2011: Ferro-ZNTU
- 2011–2013: BC Kalev
- 2013–2014: Gamateks Pamukkale Üniversitesi
- 2014–2015: BC Kalev
- 2015: Barons/LDz
- 2015–2016: Valmiera/ORDO
- 2016–2017: VEF Rīga

Career highlights
- 3× LBL champion (2008, 2016, 2017); 3× KML champion (2011, 2012, 2013); FIBA EuroCup champion (2008); PLK champion (2003); LBL Finals MVP (2008); KML Finals MVP (2011); 5× LBL All-Star (2007, 2008, 2009, 2016, 2017); Baltic League All Star (2008); FIBA EuroCup All Star (2008); FIBA Europe League All Star (2004); PLK Best Young Player (2004)

Armands Šķēle (born 4 September 1983) is a Latvian former professional basketball player who played as a shooting guard. Šķēle was a member of the Latvian National Team, representing Latvia in five EuroBasket tournaments and earning 99 caps. In 2008, he won the EuroCup with Barons LMT.

== Professional career ==
Šķēle began his professional career with Brocēni, which was one of the leading clubs in Latvia at the time. In 2001, he signed a multi-year contract with Polish club Anwil Włocławek. Under head coach Andrej Urlep, he established himself as a key player for the team. His playing style was compared in media reports to Serbian guard Aleksandar Đorđević. He won the Polish League championship with Anwil in the 2002–03 season.

In 2004, Šķēle was linked with a potential move to Real Madrid, where he was considered as a possible backup to Louis Bullock. However, no agreement was reached. In the same year, he declared for the 2004 NBA draft.

After leaving Anwil, Šķēle played two seasons in Belgium before returning to Latvia in 2006, when he signed with Barons LMT. In 2008, he helped Barons win the EuroCup and the Latvian Basketball League championship.

In 2009, he joined Italian club Basket Napoli, but the club declared bankruptcy during the season. He subsequently finished the season with BK Ventspils.

In 2011, he briefly signed with Ukrainian club Ferro-ZNTU before moving to Estonia to join BC Kalev/Cramo. With Kalev/Cramo, he won three consecutive Estonian League championships (2010–11, 2011–12, 2012–13).

In 2015, he signed with Valmiera/ORDO and won the Latvian League championship in the 2015–16 season. He won another Latvian League title with VEF Rīga in 2016–17, helping the team reach the VTB League playoffs.

== Latvian National Team ==
Armands Šķēle made his Latvian National Team debut on 20 November 2002 in a win against Poland. In 2009, following EuroBasket 2009, the Latvian Basketball Association suspended him from the national team, citing disciplinary issues. He later returned to represent Latvia.

Šķēle played at EuroBasket 2003, EuroBasket 2005, EuroBasket 2007, EuroBasket 2009 and EuroBasket 2013. In total, he made 99 appearances for the national team.

== Trivia ==
He was nicknamed "Big Time". In April 2012, during an Estonian League playoff game, Šķēle made a behind-the-back shot that gained significant attention online.

== Family ==
His younger brother, Aigars, is also a professional basketball player.

== Autobiography ==
In December 2020, Šķēle's autobiography, Starp dzīvi un basketbolu, was published. In it, Šķēle talks about his career and various events that took place in his life. In September 2025, the book was published in Estonian.

== Honours ==
- 1998–99 Latvian League (BK Brocēni)
- 2002–03 Polish League (Anwil Włocławek)
- 2004–05 Belgian Cup (Liège Basket)
- 2004–05 Belgian SuperCup (Liège Basket)
- 2007–08 Latvian League (Barons LMT)
- 2007–08 FIBA EuroCup (Barons LMT)
- 2010–11 Estonian League (BC Kalev/Cramo)
- 2011–12 Estonian League (BC Kalev/Cramo)
- 2012–13 Estonian League (BC Kalev/Cramo)
- 2015–16 Latvian League (Valmiera/ORDO)
- 2016–17 Latvian League (VEF Rīga)
