= BC Kalev =

Estonian basketball club

Bigbank/Kalev
- Nickname: Kalev, Kalevlased
- Leagues: Korvpalli Meistriliiga; Estonian-Latvian Basketball League; Europe Cup
- Founded: 1998; 28 years ago
- History: List: Canon ENM (1998–1999); Ehitustööriist (1999–2005); BC Kalev (2005–present)
- Arena: Kalev Sports Hall; Nord Sports Hall
- Capacity: 1,700; 1,066
- Location: Tallinn, Estonia
- Team colors: White, Blue
- Main sponsor: Bigbank
- President: Toomas Linamäe
- General manager: Ramo Kask
- Head coach: Brett Nõmm
- Team captain: Martin Dorbek
- Championships: 1 Estonian-Latvian Championship; 15 Estonian Championships; 10 Estonian Cups
- Website: bckalev.ee
Home	Away

BC Kalev, also known as Bigbank/Kalev for sponsorship reasons, is a professional basketball club based in Tallinn, Estonia. The team plays in the Korvpalli Meistriliiga (KML), the Estonian-Latvian Basketball League and the FIBA Europe Cup. Their home arena is the Kalev Sports Hall.

BC Kalev have been the most successful Estonian basketball club in the last two decades, having won one Estonian-Latvian League championship, 15 Estonian League championships and 10 Estonian Cup titles.

== History ==
=== 1998–2005: early years ===
Founded in 1998, the club started out as Canon Eesti noortemeeskond (Canon Estonia junior team). The team was coached by Allan Dorbek and played their home games at Kalev Sports Hall. The club's first season was a disappointment as they finished in last place without winning a single game. In 1999, Ehitustööriist became the official name sponsor of the team. In 2003, the club merged operations with Audentes and became Ehitustööriist/Audentes. However, the merger only lasted one season and Ehitustööriist continued independently.

Ehitustööriist moved to the new Saku Suurhall, now Unibet Arena, for the 2004–05 season. The team also made their debut in the Baltic Basketball League (BBL). In 2005, they won their first Estonian championship, defeating Tartu Ülikool/Rock four games to three in the finals. Howard Frier was named the KML Most Valuable Player (MVP).

=== 2005–2026: BC Kalev/Cramo ===
Coming off their first ever championship, Ehitustööriist leased the trademark "BC Kalev" from AS Kalev and became BC Kalev/Cramo, the trademark BC Kalev was firstly owned by the company Wiklar bilansis. After Wiklar bankruptcy the BC Kalev trademark was bought by BC Rakvere Tarvas. In 2002 the name was sold to AS Kalev. Allan Dorbek, who had been with the team since the start, was replaced as head coach by Aivar Kuusmaa. On 2 October 2005, BC Kalev/Cramo won their first Estonian Cup, defeating TÜ/Rock 70–64 in the final. They also made their debut in a European competition by competing in the 2005–06 season of the FIBA EuroCup, but failed to advance past the group stage. The team successfully defended their Estonian League title in 2006. In the finals, BC Kalev/Cramo edged TÜ/Rock four games to three, winning the deciding seventh game 69–68. James Williams was named the KML Finals MVP. Despite guiding the team to a second consecutive KML championship, Kuusmaa was replaced as head coach by Veselin Matić ahead of the 2006–07 season.

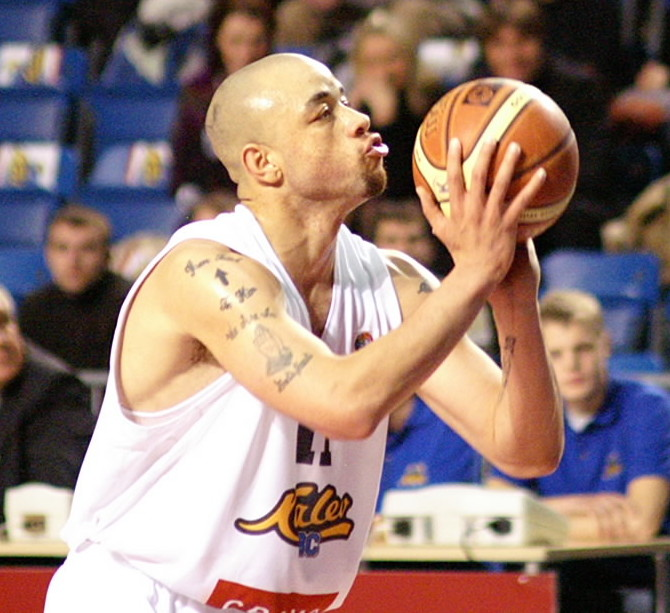
Travis Reed was named both BBL MVP and KML MVP in 2007.

In the 2006–07 season, BC Kalev/Cramo won their second Estonian Cup, but were unable to defend their league title, losing to rivals TÜ/Rock in the finals. The team also finished top-six in the Baltic Basketball League. Travis Reed was named Most Valuable Player in both the BBL and the KML, while Valmo Kriisa won the Estonian Basketball Player of the Year award. The team saw limited success in Europe, reaching the second round in the 2006–07 FIBA EuroCup and competing in the 2007–08 ULEB Cup, where they failed to advance past the group stage. The team won another Estonian Cup in 2007. Prior to the 2008–09 season, Nenad Vučinić was hired as the new head coach. BC Kalev/Cramo went on to win their fourth consecutive Estonian Cup. In the 2009 KML Finals, the team defeated TÜ/Rock four games to two, to win their third Estonian League title. Kristjan Kangur was named KML Finals MVP and Estonian Basketball Player of the Year, but left the team after the 2008–09 season. In July 2009, they joined the newly established VTB United League. In December 2009, Vučinić left BC Kalev/Cramo and was succeeded by assistant coach Alar Varrak. The team struggled in the 2009–10 KML season and finished the regular season in fourth place. In the playoffs, BC Kalev/Cramo lost to TÜ/Rock in the semifinals, but beat TTÜ Korvpalliklubi in the series for the third place.

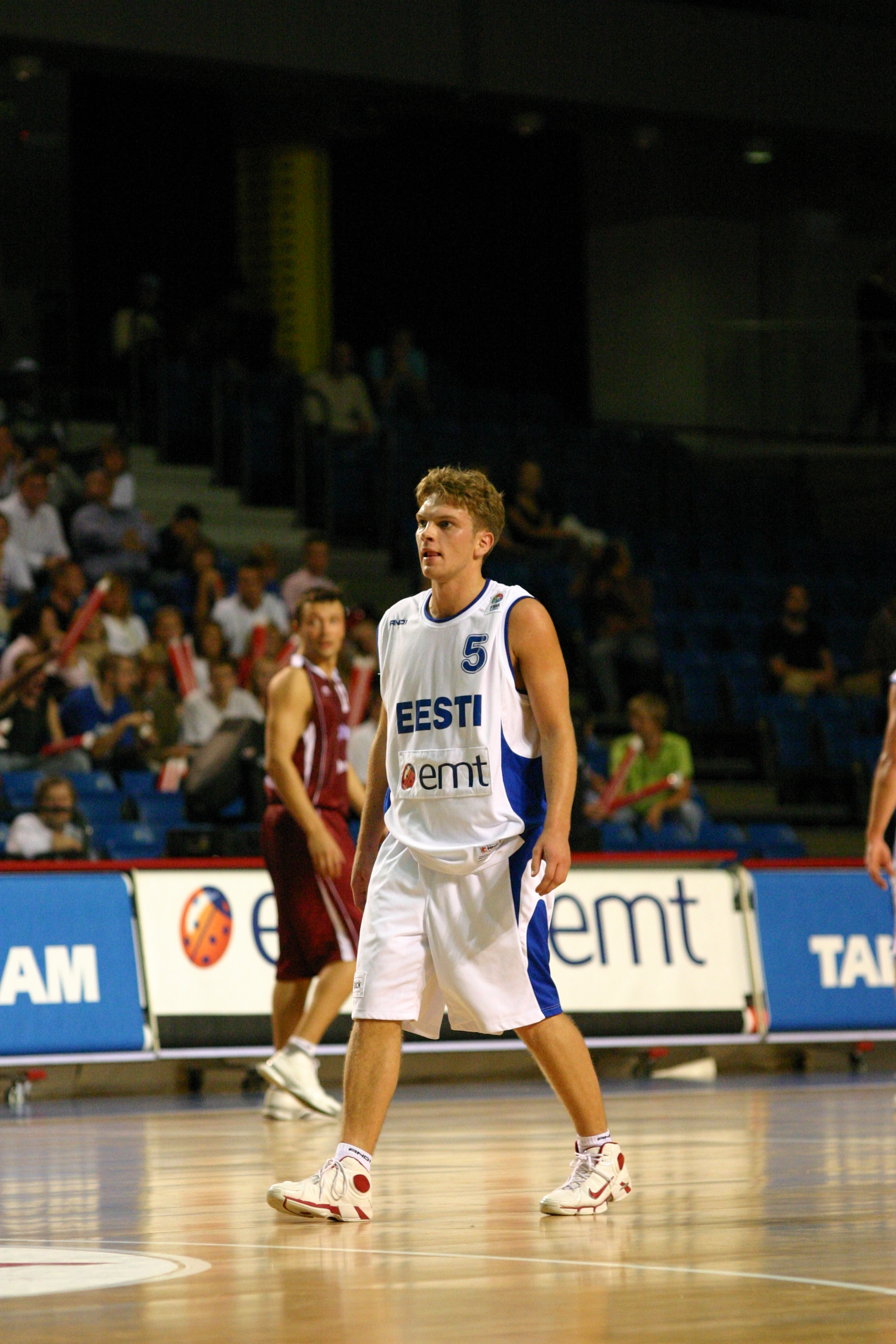
Tanel Sokk was a two-time KML Finals MVP (2012 and 2013).

Aivar Kuusmaa returned to coach BC Kalev/Cramo prior to the 2010–11 season. The team finished the regular season in first place and swept the playoffs, beating TÜ/Rock in four games in the finals. Armands Šķēle won the KML Finals MVP award. Led by Gregor Arbet and Tanel Sokk, BC Kalev/Cramo successfully defended their title in the 2011–12 season, defeating Tartu Ülikool in another four-game sweep in the finals. Sokk was named MVP for the series.

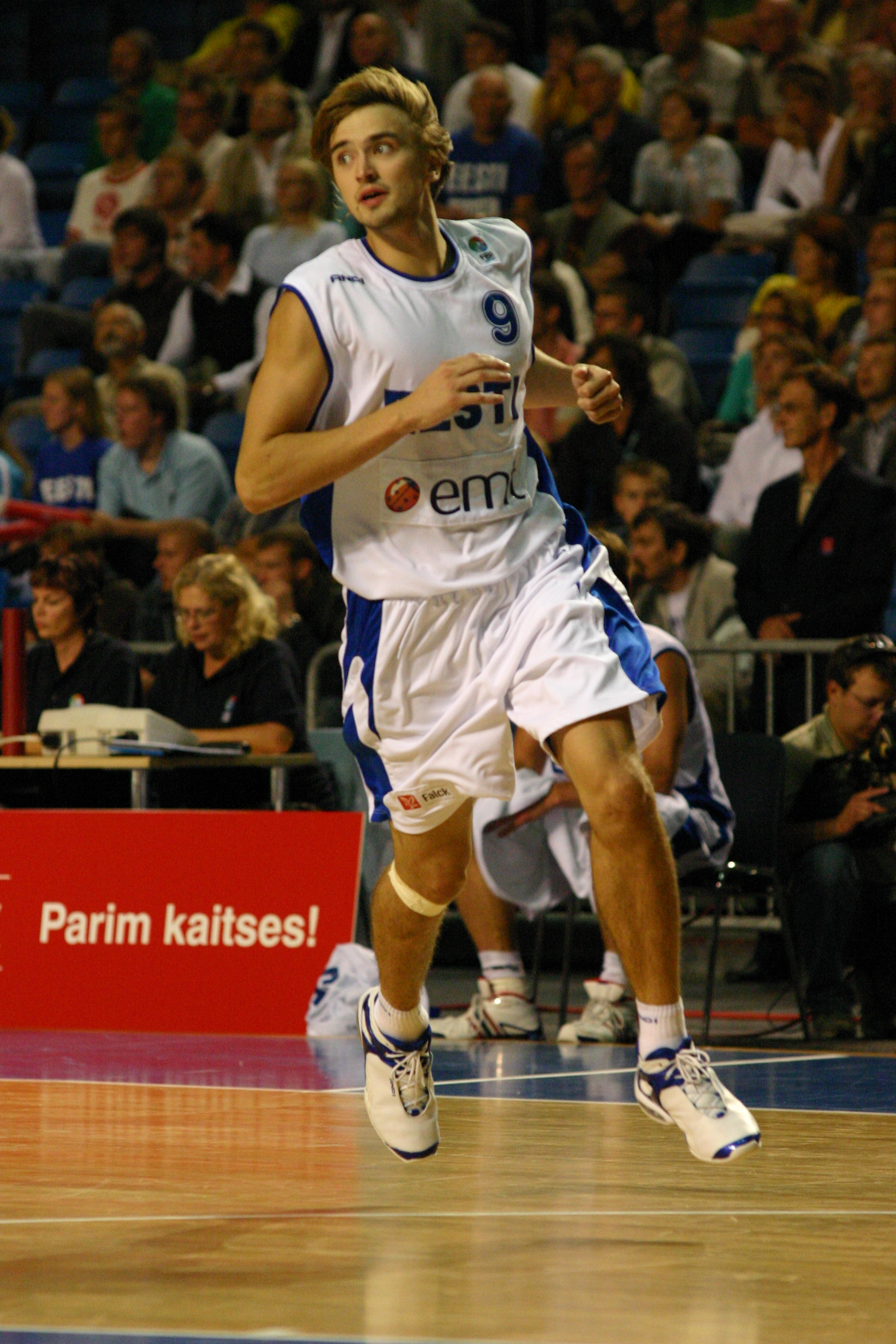
Gregor Arbet helped BC Kalev/Cramo win seven KML titles.

BC Kalev/Cramo struggled early in the 2012–13 season and on 24 November 2012, Kuusmaa was fired and replaced by assistant coach Alar Varrak. However, despite the poor start, the team finished the regular season in first place and again swept the playoffs, beating TÜ/Rock in the finals as Tanel Sokk claimed his second straight KML Finals MVP. They also placed third in the Baltic Basketball League. The team, led by Frank Elegar, Vlad Moldoveanu and Rain Veideman, played in the Eurocup in the 2013–14 season, but failed to advance past the group stage. BC Kalev/Cramo, however, continued to be successful in the Estonian League as they swept the playoffs for the fourth consecutive season, once again defeating TÜ/Rock in the finals, with Moldoveanu being named Finals MVP. In 2015, BC Kalev/Cramo, led by Scott Machado, once again faced TÜ/Rock in the KML Finals, only this time losing the series 4–1.

BC Kalev/Cramo won their fifth Estonian Cup in 2015. The team finished the 2015–16 KML regular season undefeated and extended their winning streak in the quarter- and semifinals. In the finals, they once again faced TÜ/Rock, winning the series 4–1. Rolands Freimanis was named the KML Finals MVP. In 2016, BC Kalev/Cramo won another Estonian Cup. They successfully defended their KML title in the 2016–17 season, sweeping AVIS UTILITAS Rapla in four games in the finals. Branko Mirković won the Finals MVP award. In November 2017, Varrak was fired after a poor start to the season and replaced by Donaldas Kairys. Under Kairys, the team, led by Isaiah Briscoe, won their third consecutive KML championship in 2018 by sweeping Tartu Ülikool in four games in the finals. Kristjan Kangur, who returned to the club after eight years, was named Finals MVP.

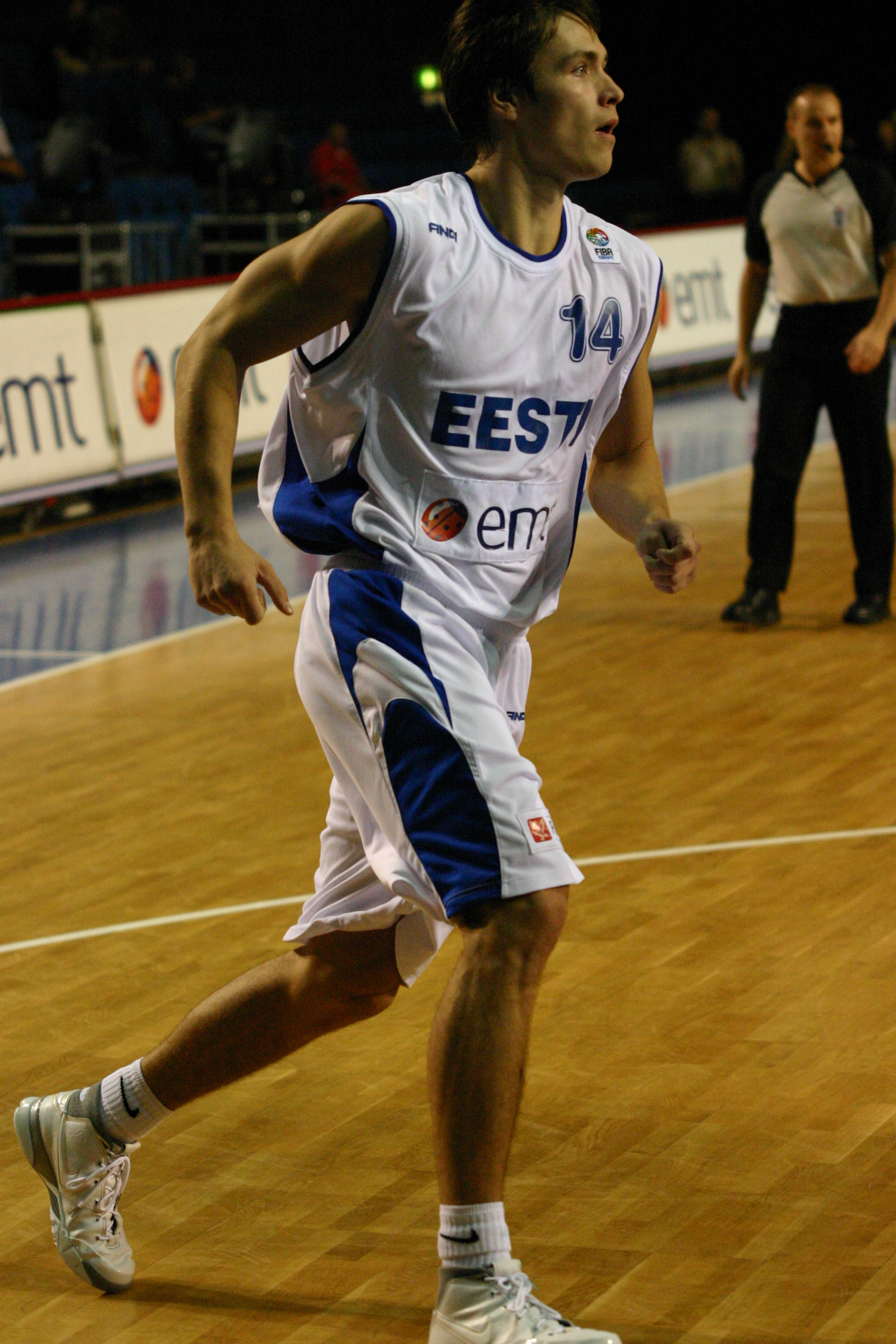
Kristjan Kangur led the team to three KML titles and was named KML Finals MVP twice.

In 2018, the Estonian-Latvian Basketball League was formed. BC Kalev/Cramo finished the league's inaugural season in third place. They lost to VEF Riga 90–80 in the semifinals but beat BK Ogre 87–85 in the third place game. With Arnett Moultrie leading the charge, they made the VTB United League playoffs for the first time in team history in 2019, but were swept in three games by UNICS Kazan in the quarterfinals. BC Kalev/Cramo also won their fourth consecutive KML title in 2019, sweeping Tallinna Kalev/TLÜ in three games in the finals. Branko Mirković was named KML Finals MVP for the second time. Kairys left the team in June 2019, and was replaced as head coach by Roberts Štelmahers. The 2019–20 season was halted and ultimately cancelled due to the COVID-19 pandemic, with no champions declared. The 2020–21 season proved to be the most successful in the club's history. On 20 December 2020, BC Kalev/Cramo won their seventh Estonian Cup, beating Rakvere Tarvas in the final. The team went on to win their first Estonian-Latvian Basketball League title, defeating VEF Riga 86–75 in the final. Maurice Kemp was awarded MVP of the final tournament. Led by Marcus Keene and Chavaughn Lewis, BC Kalev/Cramo also clinched their 12th Estonian championship by defeating Pärnu Sadam three games to one in the KML Finals. Lewis won the Finals MVP award. On 24 February 2022, they withdrew from the VTB United League due to the Russian invasion of Ukraine, ending their 13-year stay in the league. In the 2022 KML Playoffs, BC Kalev/Cramo were defeated by the eventual champions Pärnu Sadam in the semifinals, making it the first time the team missed the KML Finals since 2010. In the series for third place, they beat TalTech/OPTIBET.

After the 2021–22 season, Štelmahers was replaced as head coach by Heiko Rannula, who had previously coached Pärnu Sadam. They won their eighth Estonian Cup, beating Viimsi/Sportland in the final. BC Kalev/Cramo made it to the FIBA Europe Cup semifinals in 2023, where they were defeated by Cholet Basket. Led by Artur Konontšuk and Oleksandr Kovliar, the team swept through the 2023 KML Playoffs, defeating Tallinna Kalev/Audentes, Viimsi/Sportland, and Tartu Ülikool Maks & Moorits to win their 13th KML championship. Kovliar was named the KML Finals MVP.

== Sponsorship naming ==
- Canon ENM: 1998–1999
- Ehitustööriist: 1999–2005
- BC Kalev/Cramo: 2005–2026
- Bigbank/Kalev: 2026–present

== Logos ==
BC Kalev
(2005–2016)

BC Kalev/Cramo
(2016–2020)

BC Kalev/Cramo uncolored
(2018–2020)

BC Kalev/Cramo
(2020–2026)

== Home arenas ==
For hosting bigger games, Kalev is using Unibet Arena and Tondiraba Sports Center as home arenas.

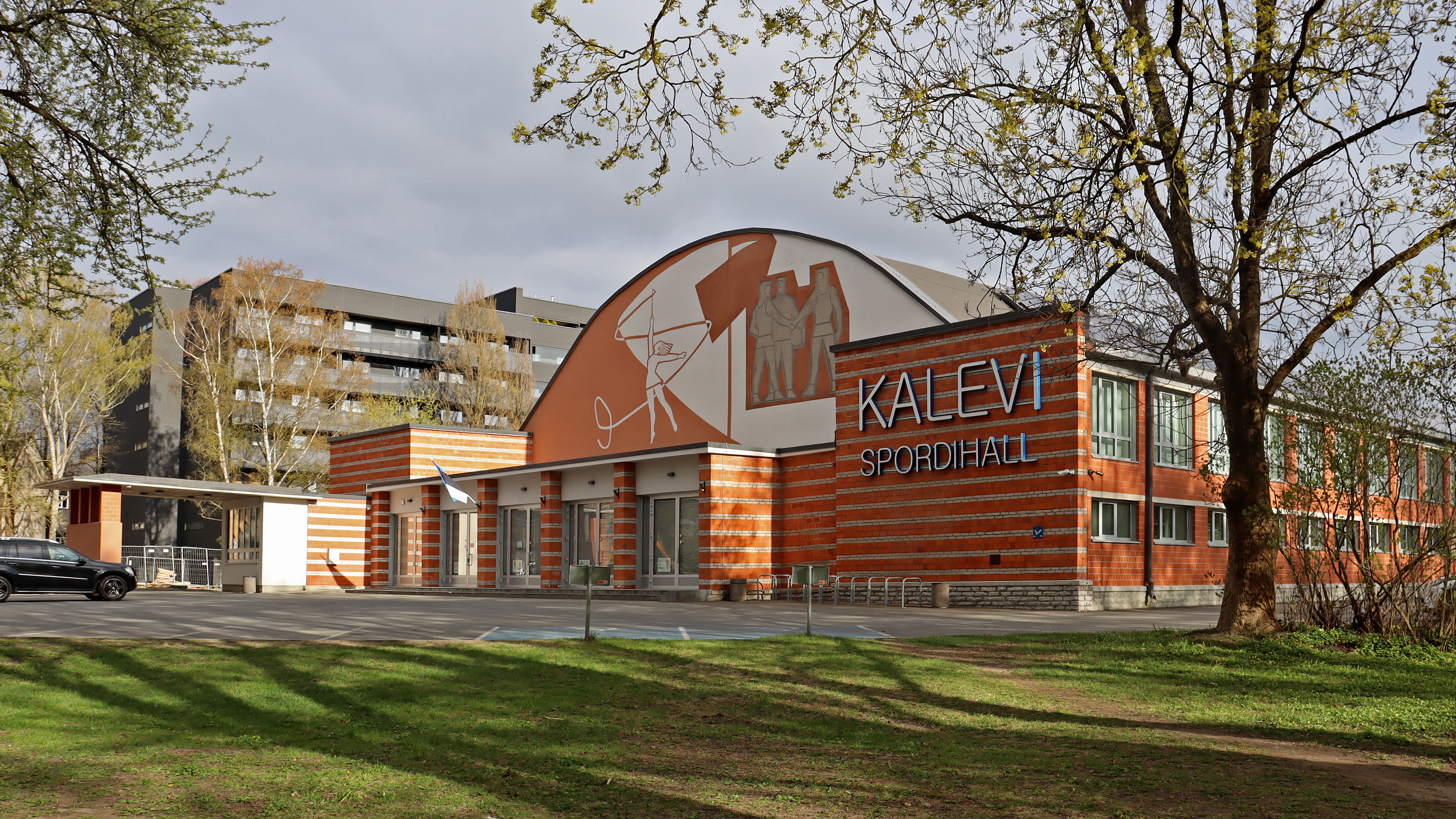
Kalev Sports Hall

- Kalev Sports Hall (1998–2002, 2005–2015, 2017–present)
- Valtu Sports Hall (2002–2003)
- Audentes Sports Center (2003–2004)
- Saku Suurhall (2004–2021), renamed Unibet Arena.

== Players ==
=== Current roster ===
Note: Flags indicate national team eligibility at FIBA-sanctioned events. Players may hold other non-FIBA nationalities not displayed.

Bigbank/Kalev roster
Players
Coaches

Pos.	No.	Nat.	Name	Ht.	Wt.	Age
PF	0	(United States)	Jelks, Stephon	1.99 m (6 ft 6 in)	104 kg (229 lb)	30 – 4 July 1996
PG	1	(United States)	Falko, Jacob	1.90 m (6 ft 3 in)	80 kg (176 lb)	26 – 2 November 2000
PG	2	(Estonia)	Vuks, Kaspar	1.90 m (6 ft 3 in)	84 kg (185 lb)	18 – 7 June 2008
PF	3	(Estonia)	Saal, Patrik	2.06 m (6 ft 9 in)	107 kg (236 lb)	26 – 16 June 2000
SG	4	(Estonia)	Saar, Hannes	1.98 m (6 ft 6 in)	94 kg (207 lb)	25 – 10 October 2001
SG	5	(United States)	Allen, KeVaughn	1.88 m (6 ft 2 in)	90 kg (198 lb)	31 – 10 October 1995
PG	7	(Estonia)	Vuks, Rasmus	1.92 m (6 ft 4 in)	86 kg (190 lb)	18 – 7 June 2008
SF	11	(Estonia)	Kuuba, Gregor (injured)	2.01 m (6 ft 7 in)	95 kg (209 lb)	23 – 8 October 2003
PF	13	(United States)	McCormack, Owen	2.05 m (6 ft 9 in)	108 kg (238 lb)	25 – 16 March 2001
PG	22	(Estonia)	Dorbek, Martin (injured) (C)	1.94 m (6 ft 4 in)	85 kg (187 lb)	35 – 21 January 1991
SF	24	(Estonia)	Põder, Stenver	1.97 m (6 ft 6 in)	91 kg (201 lb)	18 – 4 April 2008
C	33	(United States)	Forrest, Damian	2.06 m (6 ft 9 in)	110 kg (243 lb)	25 – 15 June 2001
SG	41	(Estonia)	Jürgens, Carlos	1.95 m (6 ft 5 in)	90 kg (198 lb)	28 – 27 October 1998
C	88	(Latvia)	Mālmanis, Rinalds	2.04 m (6 ft 8 in)	108 kg (238 lb)	30 – 12 April 1996

Head coach

- (Estonia) Brett Nõmm

Assistant coach(es)

- (Estonia) Kris Killing
- (Estonia) Tanel Kurbas

Physiotherapist(s)

- (Estonia) Priit Lehismets
- (Estonia) Henriette Porila

Legend

- (C) Team captain
- Injured

- Roster
Updated: 12 November 2026

=== Depth chart ===
Pos.	Starting 5	Bench 1	Bench 2
C	Damian Forrest	Rinalds Mālmanis
PF	Owen McCormack	Patrik Saal	Gregor Kuuba
SF	Hannes Saar	Stenver Põder
SG	Carlos Jürgens	Martin Dorbek	Rasmus Vuks
PG	KeVaughn Allen	Jacob Falko	Kaspar Vuks

=== Squad changes for/during the 2026–27 season ===
==== In ====
No.	Pos.	Nat.	Name	Moving from	
4	SG	(Estonia)	Hannes Saar	Tartu Ülikool	(Estonia)
5	G	(United States)	KeVaughn Allen	Medi Bayreuth	(Germany)
3	PF	(Estonia)	Patrik Saal	Keila Basket	(Estonia)
7	PG	(Estonia)	Rasmus Vuks	KK Rae Koss	(Estonia)
2	PG	(Estonia)	Kaspar Vuks	KK Rae Koss	(Estonia)
13	C	(United States)	Owen McCormack	Bristol Flyers	(United Kingdom)
33	C	(United States)	Damian Forrest	Donar	(Netherlands)
88	PF	(Latvia)	Rinalds Mālmanis	KR Reykjavik	(Iceland)
41	PG	(Estonia)	Carlos Jürgens	CB Ourense	(Spain)
1	PG	(United States)	Jacob Falko	ÍR Reykjavik	(Iceland)

==== Out ====
No.	Pos.	Nat.	Name	Moving to	
0	PG	(Estonia)	Erik Makke	Stephen F. Austin	(United States)
00	C	(Latvia)	Iļja Kurucs	Georgia Tech	(United States)
1	PF	(Estonia)	Märt Rosenthal	Tartu Ülikool	(Estonia)
5	PG	(United States)	Tyson Acuff	free agent	
7	SG	(Estonia)	Kristen Kasemets	BK Ventspils	(Latvia)
8	SF	(Estonia)	Tanel Kurbas	To career end	
9	PG	(Finland)	Severi Kaukiainen	House of Talents Spurs	(Belgium)
15	PF	(Latvia)	Anrijs Miška	Start Lublin	(Poland)
10	SF	(Estonia)	Hugo Toom	Astoria Bydgoszcz	(Poland)

== Head coaches ==
- (Estonia) Allan Dorbek 1998–2003, 2004–2005
- (Netherlands) Maarten van Gent 2003–2004
- (Estonia) Aivar Kuusmaa 2005–2006, 2010–2012
- (Serbia) Veselin Matić 2006–2008
- (New Zealand) Nenad Vučinić 2008–2009
- (Estonia) Alar Varrak 2010, 2012–2017
- (Lithuania) Donaldas Kairys 2017–2019
- (Latvia) Roberts Štelmahers 2019–2022
- (Estonia) Heiko Rannula 2022–2025
- (Estonia) Indrek Reinbok 2025
- (Finland) Anton Mirolybov 2025–2026
- (Estonia) Brett Nõmm 2026–present

== Season by season ==
Season	Tier	Division	Pos.	Estonian Cup	Baltic competitions		Other competitions		European competitions	
1998–99	1	EKKA	6th							
1999–00	1	EKKA	7th							
2000–01	1	EKKA	7th	Semifinalist						
2001–02	1	EKKA	7th							
2002–03	1	KML	7th	Quarterfinalist						
2003–04	1	KML	5th	Semifinalist						
2004–05	1	KML	1st	Quarterfinalist	Baltic Basketball League	7th				
2005–06	1	KML	1st	Champion	Baltic Basketball League	9th			3 FIBA EuroCup	R1
2006–07	1	KML	2nd	Champion	Baltic Basketball League	6th			3 FIBA EuroCup	R2
2007–08	1	KML	2nd	Champion	Baltic Basketball League	6th			2 ULEB Cup	RS
2008–09	1	KML	1st	Champion	Baltic Basketball League	5th			3 EuroChallenge	RS
2009–10	1	KML	3rd	Runner-up	Baltic Basketball League	7th	VTB United League	RS		
2010–11	1	KML	1st	Third place	Baltic Basketball League	9th	VTB United League	RS		
2011–12	1	KML	1st	Runner-up	Baltic Basketball League	7th	VTB United League	RS		
2012–13	1	KML	1st	Third place	Baltic Basketball League	3rd	VTB United League	RS		
2013–14	1	KML	1st	Runner-up			VTB United League	RS	2 Eurocup	RS
2014–15	1	KML	2nd	Third place	Baltic Basketball League	EF	VTB United League	9th		
2015–16	1	KML	1st	Champion			VTB United League	14th	3 FIBA Europe Cup	RS
2016–17	1	KML	1st	Champion	Baltic Basketball League	4th	VTB United League	11th		
2017–18	1	KML	1st				VTB United League	12th	3 Champions League	QR2
2018–19	1	KML	1st		Estonian-Latvian Basketball League	3rd	VTB United League	7th		
2019–20	1	KML	1st (Note: The season was cancelled due to the COVID-19 pandemic.)		Estonian-Latvian Basketball League	–	VTB United League	–		
2020–21	1	KML	1st	Champion	Estonian-Latvian Basketball League	C	VTB United League	10th		
2021–22	1	KML	3rd	Runner-up	Estonian-Latvian Basketball League	5th	VTB United League	WD (Note: The club withdrew from the league due to the Russian invasion of Ukraine.)	3 Champions League	RS
2022–23	1	KML	1st	Champion	Estonian-Latvian Basketball League	4th	European North Basketball League	RS	4 FIBA Europe Cup	SF
2023–24	1	KML	1st	Champion	Estonian-Latvian Basketball League	RU			3 Champions League	QR
2023–24	1	KML	1st	Champion	Estonian-Latvian Basketball League	RU			4 FIBA Europe Cup	RS
2024–25	1	KML	1st	Champion	Estonian-Latvian Basketball League	3rd			3 Champions League	QR
2024–25	1	KML	1st	Champion	Estonian-Latvian Basketball League	3rd			4 FIBA Europe Cup	SR
2025–26	1	KML	2nd	Runner-up	Estonian-Latvian Basketball League	4th			3 Champions League	QR
2025–26	1	KML	2nd	Runner-up	Estonian-Latvian Basketball League	4th			4 FIBA Europe Cup	RS
2026–27	1	KML		TBD	Estonian-Latvian Basketball League				4 FIBA Europe Cup	RS

== Trophies and awards ==
=== Trophies ===
- Estonian League

Winners (15): 2004–05, 2005–06, 2008–09, 2010–11, 2011–12, 2012–13, 2013–14, 2015–16, 2016–17, 2017–18, 2018–19, 2020–21, 2022–23, 2023–24, 2024–25
Runners-up (3): 2006–07, 2007–08, 2014–15

- Estonian Cup

Winners (10): 2005, 2006, 2007, 2008, 2015, 2016, 2020, 2022, 2024, 2025
Runners-up (4): 2009, 2011, 2013, 2021, 2026

- Estonian-Latvian League

Winners (1): 2020–21
Runners-up (1): 2023–24

- FIBA Europe Cup
  - Semifinals (1): 2022–23

=== Individual awards ===
KML Most Valuable Player

- Howard Frier – 2005
- Travis Reed – 2007

KML Finals MVP

- James Williams – 2006
- Kristjan Kangur – 2009, 2018
- Armands Šķēle – 2011
- Tanel Sokk – 2012, 2013
- Vlad Moldoveanu – 2014
- Rolands Freimanis – 2016
- Branko Mirković – 2017, 2019
- Chavaughn Lewis – 2021
- Oleksandr Kovliar – 2023
- Ben Shungu – 2024
- Severi Kaukiainen – 2025

KML Best Defender

- Bamba Fall – 2012
- Gregor Arbet – 2014

KML Coach of the Year

- Allan Dorbek – 2005
- Aivar Kuusmaa – 2006, 2011, 2012
- Veselin Matić – 2007
- Nenad Vučinić – 2009
- Alar Varrak – 2013, 2014, 2016
- Donaldas Kairys – 2018, 2019
- Roberts Štelmahers – 2021

KML All-Star Five

- Howard Frier – 2005
- Víctor González – 2005
- Rait Keerles – 2006
- Kristjan Kangur – 2007, 2008, 2009
- Valmo Kriisa – 2007
- Travis Reed – 2007
- Nate Fox – 2009
- John Linehan – 2009
- Charron Fisher – 2010
- Gregor Arbet – 2011, 2012, 2015, 2016
- Armands Šķēle – 2011
- Tanel Sokk – 2012, 2013
- Frank Elegar – 2013, 2014
- Bamba Fall – 2013
- Rain Veideman – 2014
- Scott Machado – 2015
- Shawn King – 2016
- Sten Sokk – 2016
- Branko Mirković – 2017
- Isaiah Briscoe – 2018
- Bojan Subotić – 2018
- Chavaughn Lewis – 2019
- Arnett Moultrie – 2019
- Janari Jõesaar – 2021
- Marcus Keene – 2021
- Devin Thomas – 2021
- Artur Konontšuk – 2023
- Hugo Toom – 2023, 2025, 2026
- Mikk Jurkatamm – 2024
- Manny Suárez – 2024
- Stefan Vaaks – 2025

Estonian Cup MVP

- Rain Veideman – 2015
- Demonte Harper – 2016
- Kregor Hermet – 2020
- Hugo Toom – 2022
- Severi Kaukiainen – 2024, 2025

Estonian-Latvian League Finals MVP

- Maurice Kemp – 2021

Estonian-Latvian League All-Star Five

- Janari Jõesaar – 2021
- Maurice Kemp – 2021
- Oleksandr Kovliar – 2023
- Kregor Hermet – 2024
- Ben Shungu – 2024
- Stefan Vaaks – 2025
- Hugo Toom – 2026

BBL Most Valuable Player

- Travis Reed – 2007

VTB United League Young Player of the Year

- Isaiah Briscoe – 2018

== Notable players ==
Note: Flags indicate national team eligibility at FIBA-sanctioned events. Players may hold other non-FIBA nationalities not displayed.

Criteria

To appear in this section a player must have either:

- Set a club record or won an individual award while at the club
- Played at least one official international match for their national team at any time
- Played at least one official NBA match at any time.

- (Estonia) Gregor Arbet
- (Estonia) Gert Dorbek
- (Estonia) Kregor Hermet
- (Estonia) Mikk Jurkatamm
- (Estonia) Janari Jõesaar
- (Estonia) Kristjan Kangur
- (Estonia) Kristjan Kitsing
- (Estonia) Artur Konontšuk
- (Estonia) Valmo Kriisa
- (Estonia) Martin Müürsepp
- (Estonia) Sander Raieste
- (Estonia) Sten Sokk
- (Estonia) Tanel Sokk
- (Estonia) Matthias Tass
- (Estonia) Hugo Toom
- (Estonia) Stefan Vaaks
- (Estonia) Rain Veideman
- (Brazil) Scott Machado
- (Chile) Manny Suárez
- (Latvia) Rolands Freimanis
- (Latvia) Armands Šķēle
- (Romania) Vlad Moldoveanu
- (Saint Vincent and the Grenadines) Shawn King
- (Senegal) Bamba Fall
- (Serbia) (Bulgaria) Branko Mirković
- (United States) Keith Benson
- (United States) Josh Boone
- (United States) Isaiah Briscoe
- (United States) Nate Fox
- (United States) (Estonia) Howard Frier
- (United States) Mickell Gladness
- (United States) Demonte Harper
- (United States) Marcus Keene
- (United States) Maurice Kemp
- (United States) Chavaughn Lewis
- (United States) Keith McLeod
- (United States) Arnett Moultrie
- (United States) Travis Reed
- (United States) Ben Shungu
- (United States) Cedric Simmons
- (United States) Devin Thomas
- (United States) Tony Wroten
- (United States Virgin Islands) (Guyana) Frank Elegar
