= BC Kalev past rosters =

Estonian basketball club BC Kalev/Cramo past rosters

BC Kalev/Cramo’s past and current rosters — including players featured in the 2025-26 season such as Tyson Acuff, Anrijs Miska, Kregor Hermet, Tanel Kurbas, and others — can be found at RealGM’s international rosters listing.

Note: The following page shows rosters who have won either a domestic or an international cup or championship.

== 2004–05 ==
Titles

- (Estonia) Estonian Championship (1st)

Roster

- #4 (Estonia) Tanel Kaljula (C)
- #5 (Estonia) Veljo Vares
- #6 (Estonia) Henri Ausmaa
- #7 (Estonia) Martin Uusmaa
- #8 (Estonia) Karl-Peeter Dorbek
- #9 (Estonia) Kristo Saage
- #10 (Estonia) Heiko Niidas
- #11 (Estonia) Reimo Tamm
- #12 (Estonia) Rait Keerles
- #14 (Estonia) Tõnu Uusmaa
- #15 (Spain) Víctor González
- #21 (Estonia) Erik Dorbek
- #22 (United States) Howard Frier
- #23 (United States) Nathan Mielke
- Head coach: (Estonia) Allan Dorbek
- Assistant coach: (Estonia) Heino Rebane

== 2005–06 ==
Titles

- (Estonia) Estonian Cup (1st)
- (Estonia) Estonian Championship (2nd)

Roster

- #4 (Estonia) Tanel Kaljula (C)
- #5 (Estonia) Veljo Vares
- #6 (Estonia) Gert Dorbek
- #7 (Estonia) Erik Dorbek
- #8 (Estonia) Karl-Peeter Dorbek
- #9 (Estonia) Kristo Saage
- #10 (Estonia) Heiko Niidas
- #11 (Estonia) Reimo Tamm
- #12 (Estonia) Ardo Ärmpalu
- #13 (Estonia) Sten Möldre
- #14 (Estonia) Andre Pärn
- #15 (Spain) Víctor González
- #21 (Estonia) Joosep Toome **
- #22 (United States) Turner Battle *
- #22 (United States) James Williams **
- #23 (United States) Howard Frier **
- #25 (Estonia) Rait Keerles
- Head coach: (Estonia) Aivar Kuusmaa
- Assistant coach: (Estonia) Allan Dorbek

* Only Estonian Cup
** Only Estonian Championship

== 2006–07 ==
Titles

- (Estonia) Estonian Cup (2nd)

Roster

- #4 (Estonia) Tanel Kaljula (C)
- #5 (Estonia) Tanel Sokk
- #6 (Estonia) Erik Dorbek
- #7 (Estonia) Valmo Kriisa
- #9 (United States) James Allen
- #10 (Estonia) Heiko Niidas
- #11 (United States) Travis Reed
- #13 (Estonia) Gregor Arbet
- #14 (Estonia) Kristjan Kangur
- #25 (Estonia) Rait Keerles
- Head coach: (Serbia) Veselin Matić
- Assistant coach: (Estonia) Aivar Kuusmaa
- Assistant coach: (Estonia) Mart Mäesalu

== 2007–08 ==
Titles

- (Estonia) Estonian Cup (3rd)

Roster

- #4 (United States) Marlon Parmer
- #5 (Estonia) Tanel Sokk
- #6 (Estonia) Martin Viiask
- #7 (Estonia) Valmo Kriisa (C)
- #9 (Bosnia and Herzegovina) Bojan Pelkic
- #10 (Serbia) Vladimir Vuksanović
- #11 (United States) Travis Reed
- #12 (Estonia) Rait Keerles
- #13 (Estonia) Gregor Arbet
- #14 (Estonia) Kristjan Kangur
- #22 (Estonia) Kristo Saage
- Head coach: (Serbia) Veselin Matić
- Assistant coach: (Estonia) Priit Vene
- Assistant coach: (Estonia) Mart Mäesalu

== 2008–09 ==
Titles

- (Estonia) Estonian Cup (4th)
- (Estonia) Estonian Championship (3rd)

Roster

- #5 (Estonia) Tanel Sokk
- #6 (Estonia) Rain Raadik
- #7 (Estonia) Valmo Kriisa (C)
- #8 (Estonia) Tanel Kurbas
- #9 (United States) Josh Pace
- #10 (United States) John Lewis Linehan
- #11 (Estonia) Indrek Kajupank
- #13 (Estonia) Gregor Arbet
- #14 (Estonia) Kristjan Kangur
- #15 (Estonia) Viljar Veski
- #25 (Estonia) Rait Keerles
- #32 (United States) Nate Fox
- #33 (Estonia) Martin Müürsepp *
- #42 (United States) Kevin Lyde **
- Head coach: (New Zealand) Nenad Vučinić
- Assistant coach: (Estonia) Alar Varrak
- Assistant coach: (Estonia) Mart Mäesalu

* Only Estonian Cup
** Only Estonian Championship

== 2010–11 ==
Titles

- (Estonia) Estonian Championship (4th)

Roster

- #5 (Estonia) Tanel Sokk
- #6 (Estonia) Gert Dorbek
- #8 (Estonia) Kristo Orula
- #9 (Estonia) Joosep Toome
- #10 (Estonia) Kaido Saks
- #11 (Estonia) Reimo Tamm
- #13 (Estonia) Gregor Arbet
- #21 (Estonia) Marko Riis
- #22 (Latvia) Armands Šķēle
- #25 (Estonia) Rait Keerles (C)
- #32 (United States) Michael Dunigan
- #33 (Estonia) Kristjan Kitsing
- Head coach: (Estonia) Aivar Kuusmaa
- Assistant coach: (Estonia) Martin Müürsepp
- Assistant coach: (Estonia) Alar Varrak

== 2011–12 ==
Titles

- (Estonia) Estonian Championship (5th)

Roster

- #4 (Belarus) Pavel Ulyanko
- #5 (Estonia) Tanel Sokk
- #6 (Estonia) Gert Dorbek (C)
- #9 (Estonia) Joosep Toome
- #10 (Estonia) Kaido Saks
- #11 (Estonia) Reimo Tamm
- #13 (Estonia) Gregor Arbet
- #21 (Estonia) Marko Riis
- #22 (Latvia) Armands Šķēle
- #24 (Senegal) Bamba Fall
- #31 (United States) Anthony Nelson
- #33 (Estonia) Kristjan Kitsing
- Head coach: (Estonia) Aivar Kuusmaa
- Assistant coach: (Estonia) Martin Müürsepp
- Assistant coach: (Estonia) Alar Varrak

== 2012–13 ==
Titles

- (Estonia) Estonian Championship (6th)

Roster

- #5 (Estonia) Tanel Sokk
- #6 (Estonia) Gert Dorbek
- #9 (Estonia) Kristo Mangelsoo
- #10 (United States) Tyshawn Abbott
- #11 (United States) Keith McLeod
- #12 (Estonia) Indrek Kajupank
- #15 (United States Virgin Islands) Frank Elegar
- #22 (Latvia) Armands Šķēle
- #23 (Estonia) Toomas Raadik
- #24 (Senegal) Bamba Fall
- #25 (Estonia) Rait Keerles
- #55 (United States) Gary Wilkinson (C)
- Head coach: (Estonia) Alar Varrak
- Assistant coach: (Estonia) Martin Müürsepp

== 2013–14 ==
Titles

- (Estonia) Estonian Championship (7th)

Roster

- #4 (United States) Curtis Millage
- #5 (Estonia) Tanel Sokk (C)
- #6 (Estonia) Rain Veideman
- #8 (Estonia) Kristjan Makke
- #9 (Estonia) Kristo Mangelsoo
- #10 (United States) Tyshawn Abbott
- #12 (Estonia) Indrek Kajupank
- #13 (Estonia) Gregor Arbet
- #14 (Romania) Vlad Moldoveanu
- #15 (United States Virgin Islands) Frank Elegar
- #24 (Senegal) Bamba Fall
- #33 (Estonia) Kristjan Kitsing
- Head coach: (Estonia) Alar Varrak
- Assistant coach: (Estonia) Martin Müürsepp
- Assistant coach: (Estonia) Rait Käbin

== 2015–16 ==
Titles

- (Estonia) Estonian Cup (5th)
- (Estonia) Estonian Championship (8th)

Roster

- #5 (Estonia) Sten Sokk
- #6 (Estonia) Rain Veideman
- #7 (Estonia) Sten Olmre
- #8 (Estonia) Janar Soo
- #9 (United States) Josh Boone *
- #11 (Estonia) Martin Dorbek
- #12 (United States) Sharaud Curry **
- #13 (Estonia) Gregor Arbet (C)
- #17 (Croatia) Mario Delaš **
- #24 (Latvia) Rolands Freimanis
- #25 (Estonia) Silver Jurno
- #31 (Estonia) Erik Keedus
- #33 (Saint Vincent and the Grenadines) Shawn King **
- #44 (United States) Brandis Raley-Ross *
- Head coach: (Estonia) Alar Varrak
- Assistant coach: (Estonia) Martin Müürsepp

* Only Estonian Cup
** Only Estonian Championship

== 2016–17 ==
Titles

- (Estonia) Estonian Cup (6th)
- (Estonia) Estonian Championship (9th)

Roster

- #5 (Estonia) Sten Sokk
- #6 (Estonia) Rain Veideman *
- #9 (Estonia) Matthias Tass
- #10 (Belarus) Vitali Liutych
- #12 (United States) Cedric Simmons
- #13 (Estonia) Gregor Arbet (C)
- #15 (Russia) Alexander Gavrilov *
- #15 (Estonia) Timo Eichfuss **
- #18 (Bulgaria) Branko Mirković **
- #21 (Estonia) Martin Dorbek
- #22 (United States) Demonte Harper *
- #25 (Estonia) Silver Jurno
- #30 (Estonia) Egert Haller **
- #31 (Estonia) Erik Keedus
- #32 (United States) Mickell Gladness
- Head coach: (Estonia) Alar Varrak
- Assistant coach: (Estonia) Martin Müürsepp
- Assistant coach: (Estonia) Indrek Reinbok

* Only Estonian Cup
** Only Estonian Championship

== 2017–18 ==
Titles

- (Estonia) Estonian Championship (10th)

Roster

- #1 (United States) Isaiah Briscoe
- #5 (Estonia) Sten Sokk
- #7 (Montenegro) Bojan Subotić
- #11 (Netherlands) Thomas van der Mars
- #13 (Estonia) Gregor Arbet
- #14 (Estonia) Kristjan Kangur (C)
- #15 (Estonia) Madis Soodla
- #18 (Bulgaria) Branko Mirković
- #21 (Estonia) Janari Jõesaar
- #22 (Estonia) Martin Dorbek
- #31 (Estonia) Erik Keedus
- Head coach: (Lithuania) Donaldas Kairys
- Assistant coach: (Lithuania) Giedrius Žibėnas
- Assistant coach: (Estonia) Indrek Reinbok

== 2018–19 ==
Titles

- (Estonia) Estonian Championship (11th)

Roster

- #5 (Estonia) Tanel Sokk
- #7 (Belarus) Maksim Salash
- #8 (Estonia) Tanel Kurbas
- #14 (Estonia) Kristjan Kangur (C)
- #15 (Estonia) Madis Soodla
- #18 (Bulgaria) Branko Mirković
- #22 (Estonia) Martin Dorbek
- #23 (United States) Arnett Moultrie
- #31 (Estonia) Erik Keedus
- #33 (Estonia) Kristjan Kitsing
- #40 (United States) Chavaughn Lewis
- #50 (United States) Reggie Lynch
- Head coach: (Lithuania) Donaldas Kairys
- Assistant coach: (Estonia) Indrek Reinbok
- Assistant coach: (Estonia) Martin Rausberg
- Assistant coach: (United States) Russell Bergman

== 2020–21 ==
Titles

- (Estonia) Estonian Cup (7th)
- (Estonia) Estonian Championship (12th)
- Latvian-Estonian League (1st)

Roster

- #2 (United States) Devin Thomas
- #3 (United States) Marcus Keene
- #5 (Estonia) Sten Sokk
- #8 (Estonia) Tanel Kurbas
- #9 (United States) Maurice Kemp
- #11 (Estonia) Georg Kask
- #13 (Estonia) Kregor Hermet
- #18 (Latvia) Jānis Kaufmanis
- #20 (Estonia) Rauno Nurger
- #21 (Estonia) Janari Jõesaar
- #22 (Estonia) Martin Dorbek (C)
- #24 (Estonia) Indrek Sunelik
- #32 (Dominican Republic) Marques Townes *
- #40 (United States) Chavaughn Lewis
- Head coach: (Latvia) Roberts Štelmahers
- Assistant coach: (Latvia) Akselis Vairogs
- Assistant coach: (Estonia) Indrek Reinbok
- Assistant coach: (Estonia) Alar Varrak

* Estonian Championship and Latvian-Estonian League

== 2022–23 ==
Titles

- (Estonia) Estonian Cup (8th)
- (Estonia) Estonian Championship (13th)

Roster

- #2 (Estonia) Taavi Jurkatamm
- #3 (United States) Alterique Gilbert
- #5 (United States) Wesley Van Beck
- #8 (Estonia) Tanel Kurbas
- #9 (Estonia) Artur Konontšuk
- #10 (Estonia) Hugo Toom
- #13 (Estonia) Kaspar Kitsing
- #14 (Latvia) Zigmārs Raimo
- #22 (Estonia) Martin Dorbek (C)
- #30 (Latvia) Mārtiņš Meiers
- #33 (Estonia) Kristjan Kitsing
- #50 (Ukraine) Oleksandr Kovliar
- Head coach: (Estonia) Heiko Rannula
- Assistant coach: (Estonia) Indrek Reinbok
- Assistant coach: (Estonia) Brett Nõmm

== 2023–24 ==
Titles

- (Estonia) Estonian Cup (9th)
- (Estonia) Estonian Championship (14th)

Roster

- #3 (Estonia) Kaspar Kitsing
- #6 (United States) Ben Shungu
- #7 (Estonia) Mikk Jurkatamm
- #8 (Estonia) Tanel Kurbas
- #9 (Finland) Severi Kaukiainen
- #10 (Estonia) Hugo Toom
- #11 (Estonia) Leemet Böckler
- #12 (Estonia) Mihkel Kirves
- #13 (Estonia) Kregor Hermet
- #20 (Estonia) Rauno Nurger
- #22 (Estonia) Martin Dorbek (C)
- #31 (Latvia) Jānis Bērziņš
- #44 (Chile) Manny Suárez
- Head coach: (Estonia) Heiko Rannula
- Assistant coach: (Estonia) Indrek Reinbok

== 2024–25 ==
Titles

- (Estonia) Estonian Cup (10th)
- (Estonia) Estonian Championship (15th)

Roster

- #2 (Estonia) Kasper Suurorg
- #3 (Estonia) Kaspar Kitsing
- #4 (Ivory Coast) (United States) Patrick Tapé
- #7 (Estonia) Stefan Vaaks
- #8 (Estonia) Tanel Kurbas
- #9 (Finland) Severi Kaukiainen
- #10 (Estonia) Hugo Toom
- #11 (Estonia) Leemet Böckler
- #12 (Estonia) Gregor Kuuba
- #13 (Estonia) Kregor Hermet
- #15 (Latvia) Anrijs Miška
- #22 (Estonia) Martin Dorbek (C)
- #33 (Latvia) Mārtiņš Meiers
- #42 (Sweden) Elijah Clarence*
- Head coach: (Estonia) Indrek Reinbok/ (Estonia) Heiko Rannula*
- Assistant coach: (Estonia) Kris Killing
- Assistant coach: (Estonia) Kristjan Kangur

* Only Estonian Cup
