= 2018 KML Playoffs =

Estonian national championships in basketball

The 2018 KML Playoffs was the postseason tournament of the Korvpalli Meistriliiga's 2017–18 season. The playoffs began on 17 April and ended on 24 May. The tournament concluded with BC Kalev/Cramo defeating Tartu Ülikool 4 games to 0 in the finals. Kristjan Kangur was named KML Finals MVP.

== Bracket ==
Quarter-finals
4	BC Valga-Valka/Maks & Moorits	1
5	Pärnu Sadam	3
3	AVIS UTILITAS Rapla	3
6	Tallinna Kalev/TLÜ	2

Semi-finals
1	BC Kalev/Cramo	3
5	Pärnu Sadam	0
2	Tartu Ülikool	3
3	AVIS UTILITAS Rapla	0

Finals
1	BC Kalev/Cramo	4
2	Tartu Ülikool	0
Third place
3	AVIS UTILITAS Rapla	3
5	Pärnu Sadam	1

== Quarterfinals ==
The quarterfinals are best-of-five series.

=== AVIS UTILITAS Rapla v Tallinna Kalev/TLÜ ===
18 April 2018	AVIS UTILITAS Rapla	69–73 (Series: 0–1)	Tallinna Kalev/TLÜ	Rapla
19:00	Scoring by quarter: 20–21, 21–20, 11–15, 17–17
	Pts: Kajupank 15; Rebs: Bubalo 12; Asts: Kaldre 8 PIR: Bubalo 16	Boxscore	Pts: Locke 26; Rebs: Fall 11; Asts: Akenpärg 3 PIR: Locke 31	Arena: Sadolin Sports Hall; Attendance: 490; Referees: Aare Halliko, Jegor Mitrofanski, Aleksei Mohov

22 April 2018	Tallinna Kalev/TLÜ	72–70 (Series: 2–0)	AVIS UTILITAS Rapla	Tallinn
18:00	Scoring by quarter: 21–11, 19–15, 13–26, 19–18
	Pts: Fall, Tamm 20; Rebs: Fall 11; Asts: Tamm 6 PIR: Fall 30	Boxscore	Pts: Hawkins 23; Rebs: Upson 11; Asts: Hawkins 5 PIR: Hawkins 28	Arena: Kalev Sports Hall; Attendance: 460; Referees: Tanel Suslov, Mihkel Männiste, Ranno Konks

25 April 2018	AVIS UTILITAS Rapla	73–71 (Series: 1–2)	Tallinna Kalev/TLÜ	Rapla
19:00	Scoring by quarter: 19–14, 17–21, 17–15, 20–21
	Pts: Hawkins 25; Rebs: Upson 13; Asts: Kaldre 6 PIR: Hawkins 25	Boxscore	Pts: Tamm 19; Rebs: Fall 12; Asts: Tamm 4 PIR: Tamm 21	Arena: Sadolin Sports Hall; Attendance: 720; Referees: Rain Peerandi, Mart Uuehendrik, Ivo Kitsing

27 April 2018	Tallinna Kalev/TLÜ	64–93 (Series: 2–2)	AVIS UTILITAS Rapla	Tallinn
19:00	Scoring by quarter: 12–29, 15–26, 21–23, 16–15
	Pts: Akenpärg, Locke 11; Rebs: Fall 7 Asts: Tamm 3 PIR: Fall 13	Boxscore	Pts: Cressler 24; Rebs: Upson 10; Asts: Hawkins 8 PIR: Hawkins 30	Arena: Kalev Sports Hall; Attendance: 700; Referees: Aare Halliko, Mihkel Männiste, Alex Talisainen

29 April 2018	AVIS UTILITAS Rapla	90–66 (Series: 3–2)	Tallinna Kalev/TLÜ	Rapla
18:00	Scoring by quarter: 24–15, 26–19, 19–24, 21–8
	Pts: Cressler 31; Rebs: Dorbek, Upson 8 Asts: Hawkins 7 PIR: Cressler 30	Boxscore	Pts: Locke 19; Rebs: Fall 12; Asts: Paiste, Tamm 3 PIR: Locke 24	Arena: Sadolin Sports Hall; Attendance: 780; Referees: Aare Halliko, Tanel Suslov, Mart Uuehendrik

=== BC Valga-Valka/Maks & Moorits v Pärnu Sadam ===
17 April 2018	BC Valga-Valka/Maks & Moorits	85–93 (Series: 0–1)	Pärnu Sadam	Valga
19:00	Scoring by quarter: 21–17, 24–24, 22–24, 18–28
	Pts: Lasenbergs 20; Rebs: Raadik 7 Asts: Leimanis 5 PIR: Haller 16	Boxscore	Pts: Post 28; Rebs: Sutt 8 Asts: Post 9 PIR: Post 26	Arena: Valga Sports Hall; Attendance: 275; Referees: Rain Peerandi, Mart Uuehendrik, Alex Talisainen

20 April 2018	Pärnu Sadam	85–89 (Series: 1–1)	BC Valga-Valka/Maks & Moorits	Pärnu
19:00	Scoring by quarter: 16–19, 21–26, 23–22, 25–22
	Pts: Kirves 18; Rebs: Miljković 10; Asts: Post 9 PIR: Miljković 24	Boxscore	Pts: Lasenbergs 28; Rebs: Raadik 11; Asts: Ziediņš 5 PIR: Lasenbergs 29	Arena: Pärnu Sports Hall; Attendance: 720; Referees: Tanel Suslov, Jegor Mitrofanski, Ranno Konks

23 April 2018	BC Valga-Valka/Maks & Moorits	60–64 (Series: 1–2)	Pärnu Sadam	Valga
19:00	Scoring by quarter: 19–17, 12–19, 17–9, 12–19
	Pts: Ziediņš 15; Rebs: Raadik 8 Asts: Leimanis 4 PIR: Ziediņš 16	Boxscore	Pts: Raap 15; Rebs: three players 6 Asts: Sutt 5 PIR: Raap 25	Arena: Valga Sports Hall; Attendance: 250; Referees: Aare Halliko, Mihkel Männiste, Aleksei Mohov

26 April 2018	Pärnu Sadam	90–66 (Series: 3–1)	BC Valga-Valka/Maks & Moorits	Pärnu
19:00	Scoring by quarter: 18–12, 24–16, 27–25, 21–13
	Pts: Kirves 19; Rebs: Miljković 13; Asts: Post 3 PIR: Miljković 30	Boxscore	Pts: Lasenbergs 14; Rebs: Ziediņš 9 Asts: Peterson 4 PIR: Lasenbergs 24	Arena: Pärnu Sports Hall; Attendance: 750; Referees: Rain Peerandi, Tanel Suslov, Ivo Kitsing

== Semifinals ==
The quarterfinals are best-of-five series.

=== BC Kalev/Cramo v Pärnu Sadam ===
1 May 2018	BC Kalev/Cramo	105–48 (Series: 1–0)	Pärnu Sadam	Tallinn
19:10	Scoring by quarter: 24–21, 26–14, 28–9, 27–4
	Pts: Jõesaar, van der Mars 23; Rebs: Subotić 10; Asts: Briscoe 9 PIR: van der Mars 34	Boxscore	Pts: Post 15; Rebs: Miljković 9 Asts: three players 2 PIR: Miljković 15	Arena: Kalev Sports Hall; Attendance: 570; Referees: Aare Halliko, Mihkel Männiste, Alex Talisainen

5 May 2018	Pärnu Sadam	67–93 (Series: 0–2)	BC Kalev/Cramo	Pärnu
17:10	Scoring by quarter: 13–26, 15–22, 17–23, 22–22
	Pts: Post 21; Rebs: three players 4 Asts: Post 6 PIR: Post 23	Boxscore	Pts: Briscoe 16; Rebs: van der Mars 12; Asts: Sokk 4 PIR: van der Mars 24	Arena: Pärnu Sports Hall; Attendance: 300; Referees: Mart Uuehendrik, Ranno Konks, Jegor Mitrofanski

7 May 2018	BC Kalev/Cramo	95–74 (Series: 3–0)	Pärnu Sadam	Tallinn
19:10	Scoring by quarter: 30–15, 17–23, 22–21, 26–15
	Pts: van der Mars 20; Rebs: van der Mars 13; Asts: Kangur, Mirković 5 PIR: van der Mars 31	Boxscore	Pts: Post 21; Rebs: Kirves 7 Asts: Raap 6 PIR: Kirves, Post 19	Arena: Kalev Sports Hall; Attendance: 400; Referees: Tanel Suslov, Aleksei Mohov, Ivo Kitsing

=== Tartu Ülikool v AVIS UTILITAS Rapla ===
2 May 2018	Tartu Ülikool	75–63 (Series: 1–0)	AVIS UTILITAS Rapla	Tartu
19:10	Scoring by quarter: 21–15, 25–11, 11–16, 18–21
	Pts: Sokk 27; Rebs: Talts 8 Asts: Čižauskas 5 PIR: Engström, Sokk 23	Boxscore	Pts: Hawkins 15; Rebs: Upson 8 Asts: Kaldre 6 PIR: Hawkins 16	Arena: University of Tartu Sports Hall; Attendance: 600; Referees: Mart Uuehendrik, Rain Peerandi, Aleksei Mohov

4 May 2018	AVIS UTILITAS Rapla	65–74 (Series: 0–2)	Tartu Ülikool	Rapla
19:10	Scoring by quarter: 19–15, 13–17, 11–23, 22–19
	Pts: Cressler 18; Rebs: Kaldre 6 Asts: Hawkins 3 PIR: Bubalo 14	Boxscore	Pts: Čižauskas 17; Rebs: Kazakauskas 9 Asts: Čižauskas 5 PIR: Kazakauskas 21	Arena: Sadolin Sports Hall; Attendance: 670; Referees: Tanel Suslov, Aare Halliko, Ivo Kitsing

8 May 2018	Tartu Ülikool	75–64 (Series: 3–0)	AVIS UTILITAS Rapla	Tartu
19:10	Scoring by quarter: 15–13, 13–15, 20–15, 27–21
	Pts: Cook 16; Rebs: Cook, Talts 12; Asts: Čižauskas 9 PIR: Cook 22	Boxscore	Pts: Hawkins 14; Rebs: Hawkins 9 Asts: Hawkins 11; PIR: Hawkins 31	Arena: University of Tartu Sports Hall; Attendance: 520; Referees: Rain Peerandi, Mihkel Männiste, Ranno Konks

== Third place games ==
The third place games are best-of-five series.

=== AVIS UTILITAS Rapla v Pärnu Sadam ===
14 May 2018	AVIS UTILITAS Rapla	84–77 (Series: 1–0)	Pärnu Sadam	Rapla
19:10	Scoring by quarter: 21–22, 23–20, 18–12, 22–23
	Pts: Kajupank 23; Rebs: Bubalo 14; Asts: Hawkins 7 PIR: Bubalo, Kajupank 22	Boxscore	Pts: Sutt 19; Rebs: Miljković 6 Asts: Post 6 PIR: Eichfuss 15	Arena: Sadolin Sports Hall; Attendance: 520; Referees: Aare Halliko, Mihkel Männiste, Jegor Mitrofanski

16 May 2018	Pärnu Sadam	73–67 (Series: 1–1)	AVIS UTILITAS Rapla	Pärnu
19:10	Scoring by quarter: 12–15, 17–11, 27–21, 17–20
	Pts: Kirves, Post 15; Rebs: Kirves 12; Asts: Sutt 9 PIR: Kirves 23	Boxscore	Pts: Upson 16; Rebs: Upson 12; Asts: Cressler, Dorbek 4 PIR: Upson 24	Arena: Pärnu Sports Hall; Attendance: 600; Referees: Rain Peerandi, Mart Uuehendrik, Aleksei Mohov

19 May 2018	AVIS UTILITAS Rapla	90–79 (Series: 2–1)	Pärnu Sadam	Rapla
19:10	Scoring by quarter: 29–19, 12–22, 21–14, 28–24
	Pts: Kaldre 21; Rebs: Kaldre 8 Asts: Cressler 6 PIR: Kaldre 33	Boxscore	Pts: Post 27; Rebs: Post 11; Asts: Post 5 PIR: Post 37	Arena: Sadolin Sports Hall; Attendance: 600; Referees: Aare Halliko, Tanel Suslov, Ivo Kitsing

22 May 2018	Pärnu Sadam	75–79(OT) (Series: 1–3)	AVIS UTILITAS Rapla	Pärnu
19:10	Scoring by quarter: 19–15, 16–19, 13–8, 15–21, Overtime: 12–16
	Pts: Kirves 23; Rebs: Miljković 12; Asts: Raap 6 PIR: Kirves 19	Boxscore	Pts: Hawkins 29; Rebs: Kajupank 8 Asts: Kajupank 5 PIR: Hawkins 25	Arena: Pärnu Sports Hall; Attendance: 700; Referees: Aare Halliko, Mart Uuehendrik, Ranno Konks

== Finals ==
The finals are best-of-seven series.

=== BC Kalev/Cramo v Tartu Ülikool ===
15 May 2018	BC Kalev/Cramo	98–95 (Series: 1–0)	Tartu Ülikool	Tallinn
19:00	Scoring by quarter: 25–20, 30–14, 25–27, 18–34
	Pts: Briscoe 17; Rebs: Kangur 12; Asts: Mirković, Sokk 5 PIR: Kangur 31	Boxscore	Pts: Čižauskas 31; Rebs: Kazakauskas 8 Asts: Čižauskas 6 PIR: Čižauskas 37	Arena: Saku Suurhall; Attendance: 1,200; Referees: Tanel Suslov, Rain Peerandi, Mihkel Männiste

17 May 2018	BC Kalev/Cramo	103–85 (Series: 2–0)	Tartu Ülikool	Tallinn
19:00	Scoring by quarter: 24–30, 34–20, 25–24, 20–11
	Pts: Subotić 19; Rebs: van der Mars 8 Asts: Kangur 6 PIR: Mirković, Subotić 24	Boxscore	Pts: Kitsing 19; Rebs: Talts 10; Asts: Sokk, Talts 4 PIR: Kazakauskas 22	Arena: Kalev Sports Hall; Attendance: 900; Referees: Aare Halliko, Mart Uuehendrik, Ranno Konks

21 May 2018	Tartu Ülikool	82–102 (Series: 0–3)	BC Kalev/Cramo	Tartu
19:10	Scoring by quarter: 15–29, 17–20, 22–29, 28–24
	Pts: Čižauskas 29; Rebs: Kazakauskas, Kitsing 6 Asts: Talts 8 PIR: Čižauskas 26	Boxscore	Pts: Briscoe 27; Rebs: Subotić 8 Asts: Dorbek 6 PIR: Briscoe 34	Arena: University of Tartu Sports Hall; Attendance: 950; Referees: Rain Peerandi, Tanel Suslov, Jegor Mitrofanski

24 May 2018	Tartu Ülikool	83–99 (Series: 0–4)	BC Kalev/Cramo	Tartu
19:10	Scoring by quarter: 24–20, 21–24, 20–31, 18–24
	Pts: Kitsing 21; Rebs: Kazakauskas 8 Asts: Čižauskas 6 PIR: Kazakauskas 24	Boxscore	Pts: Briscoe 20; Rebs: Jõesaar, Kangur 8 Asts: Mirković 6 PIR: Kangur, Mirković 20	Arena: University of Tartu Sports Hall; Attendance: 950; Referees: Tanel Suslov, Mart Uuehendrik, Ivo Kitsing
