= 2017–18 KML season =

Estonian national championships in basketball

Alexela Korvpalli Meistriliiga^{1}
- Season: 2017–18
- Duration: 5 October 2017 – 24 May 2018
- Games played: 98 (Regular season); 23 (Playoffs)
- Teams: 8
- TV partners: TV6, Delfi TV

Regular season
- Top seed: BC Kalev/Cramo

Finals
- Champions: BC Kalev/Cramo (10th title)
- Runners-up: Tartu Ülikool
- Third place: AVIS UTILITAS Rapla
- Fourth place: Pärnu Sadam
- Finals MVP: (Estonia) Kristjan Kangur

Statistical leaders
Points	(United States) Dominique Hawkins	16.96
Rebounds	(United States) Levi Giese	9.20
Assists	(Estonia) Tanel Sokk	5.03
- ^{1}Sponsored league name, referring to Alexela.

The 2017–18 Korvpalli Meistriliiga season (also known as the Alexela Korvpalli Meistriliiga for sponsorship reasons) was the 93rd season of top-tier basketball in Estonia.

The season began on 5 October 2017 and concluded on 24 May 2017 with BC Kalev/Cramo defeating Tartu Ülikool 4 games to 0 in the finals to win their 10th Estonian Championship.

== Teams ==
Locations of the 2017–18 Korvpalli Meistriliiga teams

=== Venues and locations ===
Team	Home city	Arena	Capacity
G4S Noorteliiga	Tallinn	Audentes Sports Centre	1,030
BC Kalev/Cramo	Tallinn	Kalev Sports Hall	1,870
BC Kalev/Cramo	Tallinn	Saku Suurhall	7,200
Pärnu Sadam	Pärnu	Pärnu Sports Hall	1,820
AVIS UTILITAS Rapla	Rapla	Sadolin Sports Hall	818
Tallinna Kalev/TLÜ	Tallinn	Kalev Sports Hall	1,870
TTÜ KK	Tallinn	TTÜ Sports Hall	1,000
Tartu Ülikool	Tartu	University of Tartu Sports Hall	1,650
BC Valga-Valka/Maks & Moorits	Valga	Valga Sports Hall	561

=== Personnel and sponsorship ===
Team	Head coach	Captain	Kit manufacturer	Shirt sponsor
G4S Noorteliiga	(Estonia) Indrek Visnapuu	(Estonia) Ron Arnar Pehka	Peak	G4S
BC Kalev/Cramo	(Lithuania) Donaldas Kairys	(United States) Cedric Simmons	Nike	Cramo
Pärnu Sadam	(Estonia) Heiko Rannula	(Estonia) Rannar Raap	Nike	Port of Pärnu
AVIS UTILITAS Rapla	(Estonia) Aivar Kuusmaa	(Estonia) Indrek Kajupank	Spalding	AVIS
Tallinna Kalev/TLÜ	(Estonia) Gert Kullamäe	(Estonia) Reimo Tamm	Adidas	City of Tallinn
TTÜ KK	(Estonia) Rait Käbin	(Estonia) Rain Koort	Nike	Tallinn University of Technology
Tartu Ülikool	(Estonia) Priit Vene	(Estonia) Tanel Sokk	Nike	University of Tartu
Valga-Valka/Maks & Moorits	(Latvia) Kristaps Zeids	(Estonia) Robert Peterson	Teamshield	Maks & Moorits

=== Coaching changes ===
Team	Outgoing coach	Manner of departure	Date of vacancy	Position in table	Incoming coach	Date of appointment
Tartu Ülikool	(Estonia) Gert Kullamäe	Mutual consent	23 May 2017	Pre-season	(Estonia) Priit Vene	13 June 2017
Tallinna Kalev/TLÜ	(Estonia) Raido Roos	Sacked	30 October 2017	4th	(Estonia) Kalle Klandorf	30 October 2017
BC Kalev/Cramo	(Estonia) Alar Varrak	Sacked	22 November 2017	1st	(Lithuania) Donaldas Kairys	24 November 2017
Tallinna Kalev/TLÜ	(Estonia) Kalle Klandorf	Mutual consent	6 January 2018	6th	(Estonia) Gert Kullamäe	6 January 2018

== Regular season ==
During the regular season teams will play 4 rounds for 28 games (2 at home and 2 away) with following exception:

- G4S Noorteliiga will play 2 rounds (1 round at home and 1 round away in total).

Double points will be awarded to teams winning those games.

=== League table ===
Pos	Team	Pld	W	L	PF	PA	PD	PCT	Qualification
1	BC Kalev/Cramo	26	25	1	2367	1754	+613	.962	Advance to Semifinals
2	Tartu Ülikool	26	19	7	2170	1939	+231	.731	Advance to Semifinals
3	AVIS UTILITAS Rapla	26	15	11	2039	1986	+53	.577	Advance to Quarterfinals
4	BC Valga-Valka/Maks & Moorits	26	12	14	2111	2149	−38	.462	Advance to Quarterfinals
5	Pärnu Sadam	26	11	15	2019	1989	+30	.423	Advance to Quarterfinals
6	Tallinna Kalev/TLÜ	26	10	16	1931	2077	−146	.385	Advance to Quarterfinals
7	TTÜ KK	26	6	20	1988	2118	−130	.231	
8	G4S Noorteliiga	14	0	14	835	1448	−613	.000	

Source: Turniiritabel

=== Results ===
Home \ Away	G4S	KAL	PÄR	RAP	TLÜ	TTÜ	TÜ	VAL	G4S	KAL	PÄR	RAP	TLÜ	TTÜ	TÜ	VAL
G4S Noorteliiga		44–112	67–110	80–103	63–94	48–89	71–100	84–108								
BC Kalev/Cramo	126–51		88–72	78–76	98–53	90–63	86–70	97–73			89–68	84–70	97–64	85–62	73–75	92–66
Pärnu Sadam	107–56	78–87		73–78	72–78	85–80	70–82	83–66		86–93		70–75	68–72	74–64	64–83	79–95
AVIS UTILITAS Rapla	92–60	53–90	74–71		65–64	88–80	84–78	79–90		65–100	73–80		94–64	92–76	73–89	91–75
TLÜ/Kalev	108–66	59–84	76–80	56–78		85–91	85–77	87–73		72–86	68–75	76–70		63–76	64–95	87–68
TTÜ KK	101–46	71–86	53–80	72–73	75–82		79–83	89–85		92–105	67–76	75–97	77–79		74–88	81–88
Tartu Ülikool	88–59	68–73	78–62	75–64	90–80	79–71		82–70		82–90	84–67	77–65	87–78	79–84		98–86
BC Valga-Valka/Maks & Moorits	110–40	67–91	93–87	77–67	99–77	97–74	91–87			54–87	70–82	76–100	73–60	85–72	76–96	

Updated to match(es) played on unknown. Source: Tulemused
Legend: Blue = home team win; Red = away team win.

== Playoffs ==
The playoffs began on 17 April and ended on 24 May 2018. The tournament concluded with BC Kalev/Cramo defeating Tartu Ülikool 4 games to 0 in the finals.

=== Bracket ===
Quarter-finals
4	BC Valga-Valka/Maks & Moorits	1
5	Pärnu Sadam	3
3	AVIS UTILITAS Rapla	3
6	Tallinna Kalev/TLÜ	2

Semi-finals
1	BC Kalev/Cramo	3
5	Pärnu Sadam	0
2	Tartu Ülikool	3
3	AVIS UTILITAS Rapla	0

Finals
1	BC Kalev/Cramo	4
2	Tartu Ülikool	0
Third place
3	AVIS UTILITAS Rapla	3
5	Pärnu Sadam	1

== Individual statistics ==
Players qualify to this category by having at least 50% games played.

=== Points ===
Rank	Name	Team	Games	Points	PPG
1	(United States) Dominique Hawkins	AVIS UTILITAS Rapla	23	390	16.96
2	(Lithuania) Vytenis Čižauskas	Tartu Ülikool	27	444	16.44
3	(United States) Nolan Cressler	AVIS UTILITAS Rapla	34	551	16.21
4	(United States) Isaiah Briscoe	BC Kalev/Cramo	24	383	15.96
5	(United States) Levi Giese	TTÜ KK	20	316	15.80

=== Rebounds ===
Rank	Name	Team	Games	Rebounds	RPG
1	(United States) Levi Giese	TTÜ KK	20	184	9.20
2	(Senegal) Bamba Fall	Tallinna Kalev/TLÜ	31	272	8.77
3	(Sweden) Carl Engström	Tartu Ülikool	30	229	7.63
4	(Estonia) Rain Raadik	BC Valga-Valka/Maks & Moorits	30	225	7.50
5	(Lithuania) Julius Kazakauskas	Tartu Ülikool	21	151	7.19

=== Assists ===
Rank	Name	Team	Games	Assists	APG
1	(Estonia) Tanel Sokk	Tartu Ülikool	29	146	5.03
2	(Lithuania) Vytenis Čižauskas	Tartu Ülikool	27	134	4.96
3	(United States) Dominique Hawkins	AVIS UTILITAS Rapla	23	103	4.48
4	(United States) Isaiah Briscoe	BC Kalev/Cramo	24	104	4.33
5	(Estonia) Norman Käbin	TTÜ KK	26	109	4.19

== All-Star Game ==
The 2018 All-Star Game was played on 16 February 2018 in Tallinn at the Saku Suurhall. Team Olybet LBL won the game 127–126 in overtime. The MVP of the game was Isaiah Briscoe, who scored 39 points.

(Estonia) Team Alexela KML
Pos	Player	Team
Starters
G	(United States) Isaiah Briscoe	BC Kalev/Cramo
G	(Estonia) Saimon Sutt	Pärnu Sadam
F	(Estonia) Janar Talts	Tartu Ülikool
F	(Estonia) Kristjan Kangur (C)	BC Kalev/Cramo
C	(United States) Cedric Simmons	BC Kalev/Cramo
Reserves
G	(United States) Dominique Hawkins	AVIS UTILITAS Rapla
G	(Estonia) Sten Olmre	TTÜ KK
G	(Estonia) Kristo Saage	Tallinna Kalev/TLÜ
G	(Estonia) Egert Haller	BC Valga-Valka/Maks & Moorits
F	(Estonia) Indrek Kajupank	AVIS UTILITAS Rapla
F	(Estonia) Mihkel Kirves	Pärnu Sadam
F	(United States) Devonte Upson	AVIS UTILITAS Rapla
C	(Senegal) Bamba Fall	Tallinna Kalev/TLÜ
Head coach: (Lithuania) Donaldas Kairys (BC Kalev/Cramo)

(Latvia) Team Olybet LBL
Pos	Player	Team
Starters
G	(Latvia) Aigars Šķēle	BK Ventspils
G	(Latvia) Edgars Jeromanovs (C)	BK Jūrmala
F	(Latvia) Roberts Freimanis	BK Ventspils
F	(Latvia) Kristaps Miglinieks	BC Valga-Valka/Maks & Moorits
C	(Latvia) Jurijs Aleksejevs	BK Jēkabpils
Reserves
G	(Latvia) Jānis Kaufmanis	Valmiera/ORDO
G	(Latvia) Mārcis Vītols	BK Ogre
G	(Mexico) Alex Pérez	VEF Rīga
G	(Latvia) Haralds Kārlis	Valmiera/ORDO
G	(Latvia) Toms Leimanis	BC Valga-Valka/Maks & Moorits
F	(Latvia) Linards Jaunzems	Latvijas Universitāte
F	(Latvia) Mareks Mejeris	VEF Rīga
C	(Latvia) Viktors Iļjins	Valmiera/ORDO
Head coach: (Latvia) Roberts Štelmahers (BK Ventspils)

16 February 2018	Team Alexela KML (Estonia)	126–127OT	(Latvia) Team Olybet LBL	Tallinn
18:30	Scoring by quarter: 33–41, 24–32, 31–29, 33–19, Overtime: 5–6
	Pts: Briscoe 39; Rebs: Kangur, Sutt 6 Asts: five players 3 PIR: Briscoe 33	Boxscore	Pts: Freimanis 19; Rebs: Freimanis, Mejeris 6 Asts: Pérez 7 PIR: Leimanis, Pérez 22	Arena: Saku Suurhall; Referees: Madis Allik, Aleksei Mohov, Ivar Kitsing

== Awards ==
=== Finals Most Valuable Player ===
- (Estonia) Kristjan Kangur (BC Kalev/Cramo)

=== Best Young Player ===
- (Estonia) Matthias Tass (BC Kalev/Cramo / TTÜ KK)

=== Best Defender ===
- (Estonia) Mihkel Kirves (Pärnu Sadam)

=== Coach of the Year ===
- (Lithuania) Donaldas Kairys (BC Kalev/Cramo)

=== KML All-Star Five ===
Pos	Player	Team
PG	(Estonia) Tanel Sokk	Tartu Ülikool
SG	(United States) Isaiah Briscoe	BC Kalev/Cramo
SF	(United States) Dominique Hawkins	AVIS UTILITAS Rapla
PF	(Serbia) Bojan Subotić	BC Kalev/Cramo
C	(Estonia) Janar Talts	Tartu Ülikool

=== Player of the Month ===
Month	Player	Team
October	(Estonia) Egert Haller	BC Valga-Valka/Maks & Moorits
November	(Senegal) Bamba Fall	Tallinna Kalev/TLÜ
December	(Estonia) Janari Jõesaar	BC Kalev/Cramo
January	(Bulgaria) Branko Mirković	BC Kalev/Cramo
February	(Estonia) Janar Talts	Tartu Ülikool
March	(Estonia) Kristjan Kitsing	Tartu Ülikool

== See also ==
- 2017–18 Basketball Champions League
- 2017–18 FIBA Europe Cup
- 2017–18 VTB United League
- 2017–18 Baltic Basketball League
- 2017–18 Latvian Basketball League
