= KML Best Defender Award =

Estonian sport award

The KML Best Defender Award (Estonian: Korvpalli Meistriliiga parim kaitsemängija) is an award for the top-tier professional basketball league in Estonia, the Korvpalli Meistriliiga.

== Winners ==
Season	Player	Team
2011–12	(Senegal) Bamba Fall	BC Kalev/Cramo
2012–13	(Estonia) Martin Dorbek	TYCO Rapla
2013–14	(Estonia) Gregor Arbet	BC Kalev/Cramo
2014–15	(Estonia) Janar Talts	Tartu Ülikool/Rock
2015–16	(Estonia) Janar Talts	Tartu Ülikool/Rock
2016–17	(Estonia) Mihkel Kirves	Pärnu Sadam
2017–18	(Estonia) Mihkel Kirves	Pärnu Sadam
2018–19	(Estonia) Mihkel Kirves	Pärnu Sadam
2020–21	(Estonia) Märt Rosenthal	Pärnu Sadam

== See also ==
- Korvpalli Meistriliiga
- KML Most Valuable Player Award
- KML Finals Most Valuable Player Award
- KML Best Young Player Award
- KML Coach of the Year
- KML All-Star Five
