= Ozell =

Ozell is both a given name and a surname.

Notable people with the given name include:

- Ozell Jones (1960–2006), American basketball player
- Ozell Sutton (1925–2015), African-American Marine
- Ozell Wells (born 1977), Dominican-American basketball coach

Notable people with the surname include:

- John Ozell (died 1743), British translator and accountant
- Sunny Ozell (born 1978), American singer and songwriter
