= Luperón =

Luperón may refer to:

== People ==
- Gregorio Luperón (1839–1897), president of the Dominican Republic 1879–1880
- Ramón Luperón (born 1946), Cuban rower

== Other uses ==
- Luperón, Dominican Republic, a town on the northern coast of the Dominican Republic
- Gregorio Luperón International Airport, an airport in the northern Dominican Republic
- Gregorio Luperón metro station, a metro station in Santo Domingo
- Gregorio Luperón High School for Math & Science, a high school in New York City
