= BC Kraft Mööbel/Kohila =

Estonian basketball club

- Leagues: Korvpalli Meistriliiga
- Founded: 2001
- Arena: Kohila Sports Hall (capacity 800)
- Location: Kohila, Estonia
- Team colors: White and Red
- Head coach: Ozell Wells
- Website: http://www.koss.ee
Home	Away

BC Kraft Mööbel/Kohila is a basketball club based in Kohila, Estonia that played in the Korvpalli Meistriliiga, the premier professional basketball league in Estonia, during the 2007-2008 season.

== Players ==
=== Roster for the 2007-2008 season ===
- Heigo Erm (EST)
- Greg Mcquay (USA)
- #4 Rauno Tamm (EST)
- #6 Martin Uusmaa (EST)
- #7 Anton Batanov (EST)
- #8 Karl-Peeter Dorbek (EST)
- #9 Reimo Tamm (EST)
- #10 Martin Lang (EST)
- #11 Sander Saat (EST)
- #12 Raido Pomerants (EST)
- #14 Peeter Kraavik (EST)
- #15 Heiko Niidas (EST)

== Coaches ==
- Ozell Wells (USA) (head coach)
- Jüri Pritsin (EST)
