= Kalle Klandorf =

Estonian politician and basketball coach

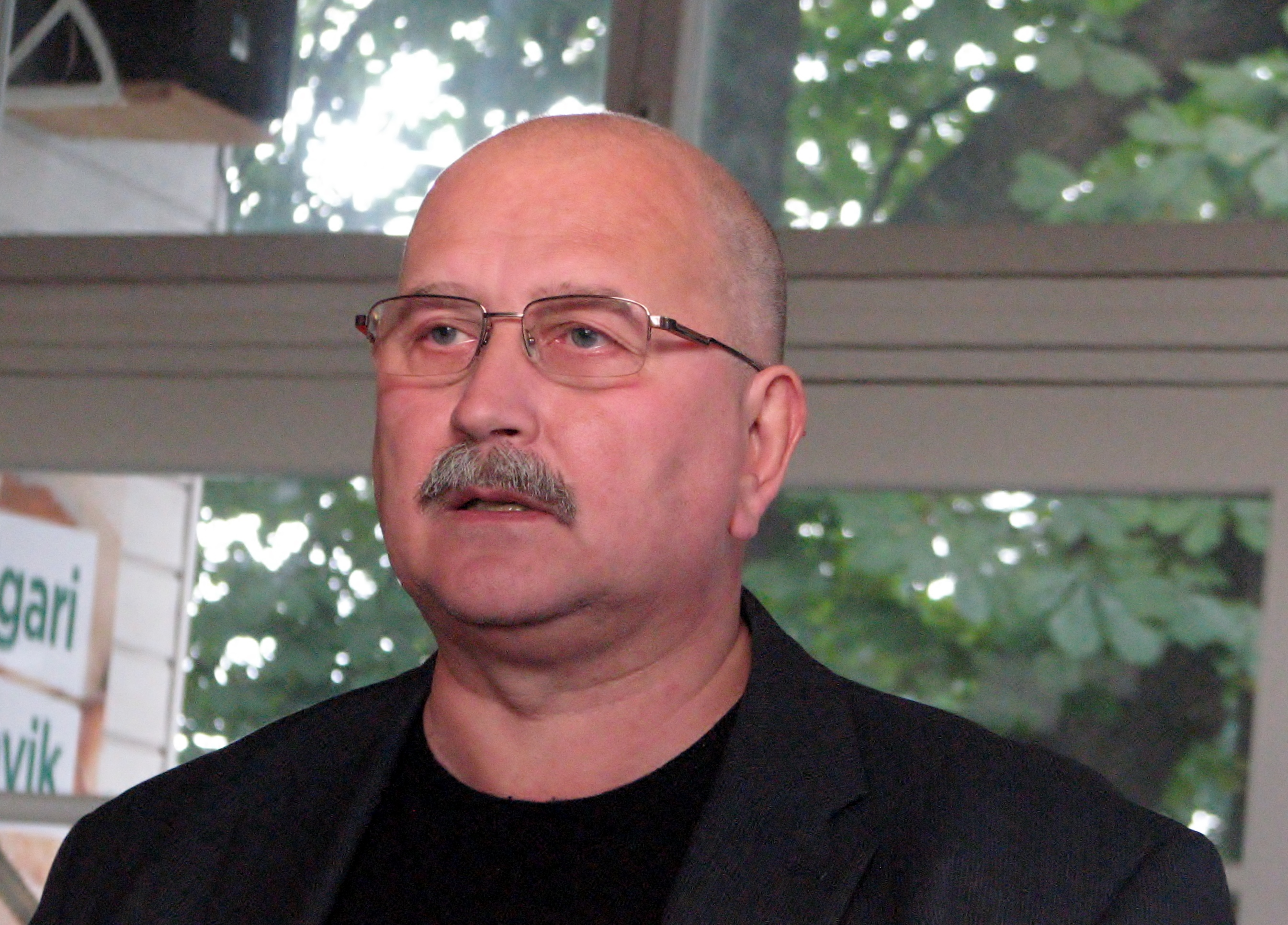
Kalle Klandorf

Kalle Klandorf (born 7 January 1956 in Tallinn) is an Estonian politician, basketball coach and sport figure.

Since 1995 he has coached the teams who play in Meistriliiga. 2012-2016 he was the principal coach of Tallinna Kalev.

1993-1995 he was the president of Estonian Dance Sport Association. Since 2014 he is the president of Estonian Boxing Association.

2005-2011 he was the elder of Lasnamäe District. 2011–2021 he was vice-mayor of Tallinn.

In 2006 he was awarded with Order of the Cross of the Eagle, IV class.
