= Ozell Wells =

American basketball coach

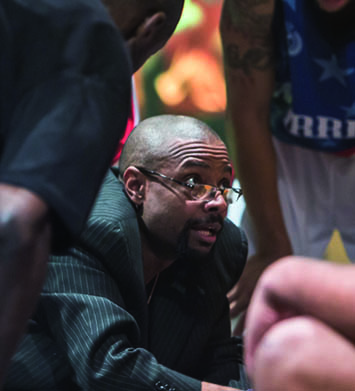
- Ozell Wells during a timeout

Personal information
- Born: January 4, 1977 (age 49) Detroit, Michigan

Career information
- High school: Cass Technical (Detroit, Michigan)
- Position: Head coach / Scout
- Coaching career: 1999–present

Career history

Coaching
- 1999–2000: Dakota Wizards and Grand Rapids Hoops (scout/assistant)
- 2000–2001: Al Hilal (Saudi Arabia)
- 2002: Tijuana Diablos (Mexico)
- 2003–2004: Zhejiang Wanma (assistant; China)
- 2004: Al-Jalaa SC (Syria)
- 2004–2005: Pueblo Nuevo, CUPES, and Gregorio Luperon (Dominican Republic)
- 2005–2006: Neptune Basketball Club (Ireland)
- 2006: Halcones de Guamúchil (Mexico)
- 2006–2007: Luxembourg national team and BC Mess (assistant/head coach; Luxembourg)
- 2007–2008: BC Kraft Mööbel/Kohila (Estonia)
- 2009: Yemen national team (Yemen)
- 2010: Trinidad and Tobago women's national team (Trinidad and Tobago)
- 2010–2011: Brunei Barracudas (Brunei)
- 2011–2012: Valga KK (Estonia)
- 2014–2016: TSG Solingen (Germany)
- 2016: Panteras de San Marcos (Dominican Republic)
- 2015–present: Ambassador: All In Sport ASD; Trieste, Italy
Medals
Representing Luxembourg
Men's basketball
Games of the Small States of Europe
Silver medal – second place	2007 Games of the Small States of Europe	National Team of Luxembourg

Ozell Wells (born January 4, 1977) is a Dominican American basketball coach, scout, ordained minister, entrepreneur, author, lecturer and businessman.

== Career ==
=== 1998-2009 ===
He began scouting professional basketball talents in 1998, he worked with the Detroit Pistons doing youth camps and clinics at schools. In the same period he served as Director of Scouting with Eurosport Enterprises in Montreal, Canada, shortly thereafter, he worked with the Grand Rapids Hoops in the Continental Basketball Association, after the demise of the CBA in 2000, he travelled to Riyadh, Saudi Arabia to coach Al Hilal.

He went to Tijuana, Mexico to coach the Tijuana Diablos in 2001, after Mexico he coached in the short lived NWBL, which was a minor league to the WNBA with the Grand Rapids Blizzard.

His next stop was in China with Zhejiang Wanma of the Chinese Basketball Association in 2003–2004, later that year, he went to Syria and coached Al-Jalaa SC, losing in the finals.

In 2004, he went to Dominican Republic and coached Pueblo Nuevo, CUPES and Gregorio Luperon, all clubs playing at different times of the year.

At the end of 2005, he returned to the Detroit Pistons, working in training camp, as a translator and an assistant for the coaching staff.

His next clubs were in Europe, where he coached in Ireland with Neptune Basketball Club during the season 2005–2006 and in Luxembourg with Wiltz Sangliers and BC Mess during the season 2006–2007.

In 2006 he went to Mexico to coach the Halcones de Guamúchil during Mexico's CIBACOPA.

In 2006–2007 he worked with the National Team of Luxembourg as an assistant coach (Youth & Senior Men), where he won 2nd place in the 2007 Games of the Small States of Europe.

In 2007, he moved to Estonia and coached BC Kraft Mööbel/Kohila, losing in the Korvpalli Meistriliiga quarterfinals.

After a sabbatical year, in 2009 he coached the Yemen National Basketball Team in the Arabian Championships, he then spent time in the Middle East, working in Bahrain and in Palestine.

=== 2010–2020 ===
In 2010, he coached the Women National Team of Trinidad and Tobago in the Centrobasket Games & Central American and Caribbean Games, in 2010, he also started Rebote Spordiklubi MTÜ in Estonia.

In 2010–2011, he coached in the ASEAN Basketball League, with the Brunei Barracudas.

In 2011, he signed in Estonia in Korvpalli Meistriliiga, as the head coach of Valga KK.

He also coached the Evolution Academy of Belgium in the 2012 Euro-Espoirs Tournoi in Duoai, Callais, France; where the team won 3rd place in the event.

At the end of 2012, Wells coached in the Netherlands at the annual Basketball Days International Tournament, winning the bronze medal.

In 2013, his club Rebote SK MTÜ signed a partnership with Global Basketball, whereby Wells scouts talent, international games and consults with federations, clubs and players.

He is also serving as the Director of International Scouting with TransAtlantic Basketball

In January 2014, Ozell Wells authored and published "MONEY", subsequently translated into French, Spanish & German.

In summer 2014, his club Rebote SK signed a partnership with HOOPLIFE in Poland, whereby Wells scouts & trains youth talents.

Wells also was a featured lecturer at the 2014 & 2015 ESTVIA physiotherapist conferences.

December 2014, Wells collaborated with a group of authors to publish "FLEETING MOMENTS"

In September 2014, he went to Germany, Solingen and coach for the TSG Solingen.

2015 Wells contracted with All in Sport ASD as an Ambassador

In 2016 returned home to work with Panteras de San Marcos (Dominican Republic)

2020, Strategic partnership with N.U.B.A (New Unified Basketball Association ) using his long pedigree of experience in the international basketball market as well as established relationships with current NBA executives.

With over 20 years of experience, he has worked in various basketball-related roles across multiple countries and leagues, including three national team organisations. In addition to his work as a professional coach, he is a lecturer, writer, and basketball analyst specialising in international basketball.

The objective of this partnership is to develop a range of projects and structure. He will work to create further global visibility for the brand.

2020, also saw him invited into the world's largest anthology, MIRAKEE.

== Personal life ==
Wells has a son.

Wells is also a Christian minister. Ordained in 1994 by Joy In Jesus Christian Center, in 2001, he founded The Holistic Alliance. Starting the Alianza Holistico SRL in Dominican Republic in 2004, he proceeded to witness to youth at local schools and churches throughout the country. In 2012, he partnered in creating Prince of Peace Film Group.

== Awards and honors ==
- 2002: XBL League finalist
- 2004: Syrian Basketball League finalist
- 2005: Dominican Republic Puerto Plata Regional League finalist
- 2006: Mexico

CIBACOPA ALL-STAR GAME

- 2007: 2007 Games of the Small States of Europe Silver Medal
- 2007: Korvpalli Meistriliiga, Estonia's National Cup Quarterfinalist
- 2008: Korvpalli Meistriliiga, Estonia's National Championship Quarterfinalist
- 2009: Palestine "Al Quds" Tournament finalist
- 2009: Morocco Arab Nations Cup
- 2010: Palestine PBBA Cup finalist
- 2010: Puerto Rico CENTROBASKET Championships
- 2010: Puerto Rico Central American and Caribbean Games
- 2011: Harjumaa Korvpallilit, Estonia Basketball Championship winner
- 2011: Harjumaa Korvpallilit, Estonia Coach of the Year
- 2011: Korvpalli Meistriliiga, Estonia's National Cup Quarterfinalist
- 2012: France "Euro-Espoirs" Bronze Medal Winner
- 2012: Holland BASKETBALLDAYS Bronze Medal Winner
- 2015: All in Sport Summer League Finalist(Italy)
- 2015: All in Sport All Star Game (Italy)
- 2015: Dudi Krainieri Summer League Finalist (Italy)
- 2015: Dudi Krainieri All Star Game (Italy)

== Books ==
- CO-AUTHOR (2020). MIRAKEE : (World's Largest Anthology).
- Wells, Ozell (2016). MONEY: 100 year old money laws & their real world application audible (1st ed.). Amazon. ASIN B01MCYRYZF.
- Wells, Ozell (2014). MONEY: 100 year old money rules & their real world application (1st ed.). Amazon. ASIN B00I4C9KRK.
- Wells, Ozell (2014). ARGENT: lois d'argent 100 ans et leur application du monde reel. Amazon. ASIN B00IMEZ6UK.
- Wells, Ozell (2014). DINERO: Dinero gobierna 100 años de edad y su aplicación en el mundo real. Amazon. ASIN B00JOSLKK8.
- Petelin, Carol (2014). FLEETING MOMENTS. Amazon. ASIN B00QCRZGQ8.
