= Indrek Reinbok =

Estonian professional basketball coach (born 1976)

Estonia
- Position: Assistant coach

Personal information
- Born: 21 July 1976 (age 50) Tallinn, then part of Estonian SSR, Soviet Union
- Listed height: 1.90 m (6 ft 3 in)
- Listed weight: 85 kg (187 lb)
- Coaching career: 2010–present

Career history

Playing
- 2000–2002: Nybit
- 2005–2008: Pirita
- 2008–2010: Tallinna Kalev

Coaching
- 2010–2011: TTÜ/Kalev (assistant)
- 2011–2012: Tallinna Kalev
- 2016–2025: BC Kalev (assistant)
- 2020–present: Estonia (assistant)
- 2025: BC Kalev

Career highlights
- As head coach: Estonian League champion (2025); As assistant coach: 6× Estonian League champion (2017, 2018, 2019, 2021, 2023, 2024; 5× Estonian Cup winner (2016, 2020, 2022, 2024, 2025); Latvian-Estonian League champion (2021)
Medals
Men's basketball
Assistant Coach for Estonia
FIBA Europe U-18 Championship Division B
Bronze medal – third place	2017 Estonia	U18 Team

Indrek Reinbok (born 21 July 1976) is an Estonian professional basketball coach and former player who most recently served as head coach for BC Kalev and currently as assistant coach for Estonian national team.

== Coaching career ==
Reinbok graduated the FIBA Europe Coaching Certificate training in 2013 and is owning the FIBA coach license.

Since 2016 Indrek is working as an assistant coach for Kalev/Cramo. As an assistant coach Reinbok has won Estonian Basketball League six times and once Estonian-Latvian Basketball League in 2021 with Kalev. Reinbok became the head coach of Kalev in February 2025 when Heiko Rannula left.

=== Estonian national team ===
He has worked as a head coach for the Estonian U20 youth team. In 2019 he was selected as an assistant coach for the Estonian men's national team. Reinbok has represented Estonian national team as an assistant coach both in EuroBasket 2022 and 2025.
