= Donaldas Kairys =

Lithuanian basketball player and coach

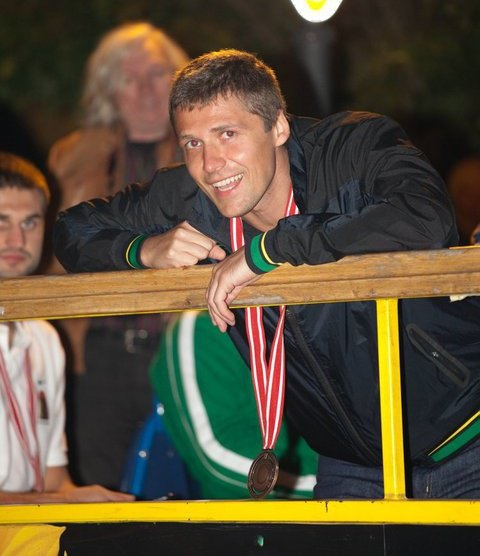
- Donaldas Kairys in 2010

Personal information
- Born: 6 March 1977 (age 49) Šilutė, Lithuanian SSR, Soviet Union
- Listed height: 6 ft 3 in (1.91 m)

Career information
- College: WWC (1996–1997)
- Playing career: 1997–1998
- Position: Guard
- Coaching career: 2005–present

Career history

Playing
- 1997–1998: Šilutė

Coaching
- 2005–2006: Khimki (assistant)
- 2006: Lietuvos rytas Vilnius (assistant)
- 2007–2008: CSKA Moscow (assistant)
- 2008: ASK Riga (assistant)
- 2008–2009: ASK Riga
- 2011: Lokomotiv Kuban (assistant)
- 2011–2012: Dnipro-Azot
- 2012–2013: Dnipro-Azot (assistant)
- 2013–2014: Tsmoki-Minsk
- 2014–2016: Energa Czarni
- 2017–2019: BC Kalev
- 2019–2020: Olympiacos (assistant)
- 2020: Avtodor Saratov
- 2020–2021: Rytas Vilnius
- 2021–2022: Hapoel Jerusalem (assistant)
- 2022–2023: Juventus Utena

Career highlights
- Head coach: Belarusian League champion (2014); 2× Estonian League champion (2018, 2019); Estonian League Coach of the Year (2018, 2019); Assistant coach: EuroLeague champion (2008); Russian League champion (2008)
Medals
Men's basketball
Representing Lithuania
FIBA World Cup
Bronze medal – third place	2010 Turkey
EuroBasket
Bronze medal – third place	2007 Spain

Donaldas Kairys (born 6 March 1977) is a Lithuanian professional basketball coach and former player.

== Coaching career ==
On 4 February 2020, Kairys was signed by Avtodor Saratov as head coach. He left the position after the season ended.

On 9 June 2020, Kairys was named head coach of Rytas Vilnius. On 16 January 2021, Kairys was fired after two decisive losses

== National teams career ==
Kairys served as assistant coach for the Lithuania national basketball team from 2006 to 2012.
