= Kristo Mangelsoo =

Estonian basketball player

Personal information
- Born: March 6, 1993 (age 33) Estonia
- Listed height: 205 cm (6 ft 9 in)
- Listed weight: 198 lb (90 kg)

Career information
- Playing career: 2012–present
- Position: Small forward
- Number: 9

Career history
- 2010–2011: BC Kalev/G4S
- 2011–2012: BC Kalev II
- 2012–2014: Kalev/Cramo

Kristo Mangelsoo (born 6 March 1993) is a former Estonian professional basketball player.

Mangelsoo started playing basketball in Viljandi and joined Kalev/Cramo when he was 17. He made his debut in the club in 2012. Mangelsoo decided to retire from basketball in 2014.
