= Toms Leimanis =

Latvian basketball player

Free Agent
- Position: Point guard / shooting guard

Personal information
- Born: August 7, 1994 (age 32) Ventspils, Latvia
- Listed height: 6 ft 2.8 in (1.90 m)
- Listed weight: 190 lb (86 kg)

Career information
- NBA draft: 2006: undrafted
- Playing career: 2012–present

Career history
- 2012–2014: Ventspils
- 2014–2016: Liepājas Lauvas
- 2016–2017: Ventspils
- 2017–2018: Liepājas Lauvas
- 2018: Valga-Valka
- 2018–2019: Koroivos
- 2019–2020: Valladolid
- 2020–2021: Tsmoki-Minsk
- 2021–2022: BC Odesa
- 2022: BC Neptūnas
- 2022–2024: Estudiantes
- 2024–2025: Obradoiro
- 2025: Diablos Rojos del México
- 2025: VEF Rīga
- 2026-: KR

Career highlights
- Baltic League champion (2013); Estonia/Latvia League All Star (2018); Latvian League champion (2014); Belarusian Premier League (basketball) champion (2021)
Medals
Men's basketball
Representing Latvia
FIBA Europe Under-20 Championship
Silver medal – second place	2013 Estonia	National Team

Toms Elvis Leimanis (born August 7, 1994) is a Latvian professional basketball player. Standing at 1.90 m (6 ft 3 in), Leimanis plays both point guard and shooting guard positions. He also serves as a member of the Latvian national basketball team.

== Professional career ==
Leimanis started his career with Ventspils, with which he made his first professional career in the Baltic League. During his first two seasons, his playing time was not big, but he managed to win with Ventspils the Baltic League in 2013 and the Latvian League in 2014.

The following two years, he played with Liepājas Lauvas. At his second year, in 62 matches at the Latvian and Baltic League, he averaged 8.4 points and 3.9 assists in 23.2 minutes per game. In the 2016–17 season, he returned to Ventspils, making his debut also in the Basketball Champions League. Overall in 41 games in the year in all competitions, Leimanis averaged 4.4 points and 1.3 assists in 12 minutes per game.

At the start of the 2017–18 season, he joined Liepājas Lauvas for a second stint. After making really good appearances with the team, he finished the season with Valga-Valka of the Latvian–Estonian Basketball League.

On July 17, 2018, he joined Koroivos of the Greek 2nd Division.

On July 4, 2019, he joined Ciudad de Valladolid of the LEB Oro (Spanish 2nd Division). On July 14, 2020, Leimanis signed with Tsmoki-Minsk of the VTB United League.

After a year in Minsk, Leimanis signed with BC Odesa in Ukraine. Playing for Odesa he averaged 13.5 points on 41% shooting from three point distance. After the season was cut short in Ukraine, Leimanis signed with Neptunas in Lithuania to finish the season there.

In August 2022, he joined CB Estudiantes.

== Latvian National Team ==
Leimanis has played for Latvian U16, U18 and U20 National Team as well as Senior National Team. In July 2013, Leimanis was part of Latvia's historic run at U20 European Championship in Tallinn, Estonia, which was highlighted by making the finals. Leimanis made Senior National Team debut on 25 February 2022. Having the debut he started the game in starting 5, played 21 minutes and helped the team win against Belgium. Leimanis helped the team to qualify for 2023 FIBA Basketball World Cup, for first time in Latvian National Team's history.

== Honors and awards ==
=== Club career ===
- Baltic League: (2013)
- Latvian League: (2014)
- Belarusian Premier League (basketball): (2021)

=== National team ===
- FIBA Europe U-20 Championship Runner Up: (2013)
