= Kayel Locke =

American basketball player (born 1994)

Free agent
- Position: Small forward

Personal information
- Born: August 18, 1994 (age 32) Baltimore, Maryland, U.S.
- Listed height: 6 ft 4 in (1.93 m)
- Listed weight: 240 lb (109 kg)

Career information
- High school: McDonogh School (Owings Mills, Maryland)
- College: UNC Greensboro (2012–2016)
- NBA draft: 2016: undrafted
- Playing career: 2016–present

Career history
- 2016–2017: Bashkimi
- 2017–2018: Helsinki Seagulls
- 2018: Tallinna Kalev
- 2018–2019: Landstede Zwolle
- 2019: Rain or Shine Elasto Painters
- 2019–2020: FC Porto
- 2020–2021: Landstede Hammers
- 2021: Abejas de León
- 2021–2022: Belfius Mons-Hainaut

Career highlights
- Dutch League champion (2019)

Kayel Locke (born August 18, 1994) is an American professional basketball player who last played for Belfius Mons-Hainaut of the BNXT League.

== College career ==
Locke played college basketball for UNC Greensboro, where he averaged 12.6 points and 5.7 rebounds per game as a junior. He finished his senior season second on the team in scoring and rebounding with 12.6 points and 5.4 rebounds per game. Locke was first in program history in games played with 130, sixth in scoring with 1,522 points and also sixth in rebounding with 652 career rebounds.

== Professional career ==
Locke signed his first professional contract in September 2016, signing with Bashkimi of the Balkan league. He also played for teams in Latvia, Finland, Estonia and the Netherlands. In October 2019 he signed with Rain or Shine Elasto Painters. In November 2019, Locke signed with FC Porto in Portugal.

On September 2, 2020, Locke returned to Landstede Hammers for a second stint. In summer 2021, he joined Abejas de León of the Liga Nacional de Baloncesto Profesional and averaged 8.9 points and 4.4 rebounds per game. On December 14, 2021, Locke signed with Belfius Mons-Hainaut of the BNXT League. He parted ways with the team on January 6, 2022.

== Personal life ==
Locke is the son of Vanessa and Kyle Locke, both of whom played college basketball at Coppin State. His brother Noah played basketball at Florida before transferring to Louisville. His sister Paris plays for the McDonogh School team.
