= Estonian Dance Sport Association =

Sports governing body in Estonia

Estonian Dance Sport Association (abbreviation EDSA; Estonian: Eesti Tantsuspordi Liit) is one of the sport governing bodies in Estonia which deals with dance sport.

EDSA is established on 23 November 1991. EDSA was a member of World DanceSport Federation and is a member of Estonian Olympic Committee.
