= Rait Keerles =

Estonian basketball player (born 1980)

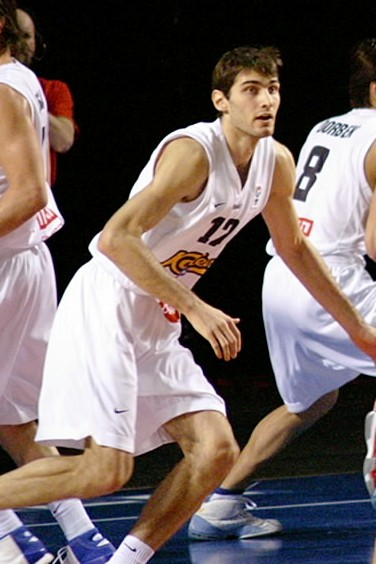
- Rait Keerles in 2007

Personal information
- Born: 22 November 1980 (age 45) Paide, then part of Estonian SSR, Soviet Union
- Listed height: 6 ft 7 in (2.01 m)
- Listed weight: 212 lb (96 kg)

Career information
- Playing career: 1997–2015
- Position: Power forward

Career history
- 1997–1998: KK Kalev
- 1998–1999: Canon ENM
- 1999–2000: Tallinna Kalev
- 2000–2011: Ehitustööriist / BC Kalev
- 2011–2012: Gloria Giants Düsseldorf
- 2012–2013: BC Kalev
- 2013–2014: Rakvere Tarvas
- 2014: CS Energia Rovinari
- 2014–2015: TYCO Rapla

Career highlights
- All-KML First Team (2006)

Rait Keerles (born 22 November 1980) is a retired Estonian professional basketball player. Keerles started his professional career in 1997, when he signed with BC Kalev. He has also played for Canon ENM and BC Tallinna Kalev before signing with BC Kalev/Cramo (previously known as Ehitustööriist). With the team he won four Estonian Cups and four Estonian Championship gold medals. From 2009 to 2011 Keerles was the captain of the team. In July 2011, Keerles signed with Gloria Giants Düsseldorf of the German 2. Bundesliga. After the season Keerles decided to return to his former club BC Kalev/Cramo. For the 2013–14 season he signed with Rakvere Tarvas but left the team with mutual consent to play for CS Energia Rovinari in Romania. For the 2014–15 season he returned to Estonia to play his last professional season for TYCO Rapla. He has also been a member of the Estonia national basketball team in 2002–03 and 2008–09 seasons.

== Honours ==
- 1997–98 Estonian League (BC Kalev)
- 2004–05 Estonian League (Ehitustööriist)
- 2005–06 Estonian Cup (BC Kalev/Cramo)
- 2005–06 Estonian League (BC Kalev/Cramo)
- 2006–07 Estonian Cup (BC Kalev/Cramo)
- 2007–08 Estonian Cup (BC Kalev/Cramo)
- 2008–09 Estonian Cup (BC Kalev/Cramo)
- 2008–09 Estonian League (BC Kalev/Cramo)
- 2010–11 Estonian League (BC Kalev/Cramo)
- 2012–13 Estonian League (BC Kalev/Cramo)
- 2013–14 Romanian Cup (Energia Rovinari)
