= Māris Ziediņš (basketball) =

Latvian basketball player

No. 8 – Tallinna Kalev
- Position: Power forward
- League: LEBL

Personal information
- Born: March 24, 1990 (age 36) Valmiera, Latvia
- Listed height: 2.03 m (6 ft 8 in)
- Listed weight: 100 kg (220 lb)

Career information
- Playing career: 2008–present

Career history
- 2008–2015: BK Valmiera
- 2015–2016: Jūrmala/Fēnikss
- 2016–2017: BK Ventspils
- 2017: Avis Rapla
- 2018: Valga-Vala
- 2018-2019: Valmiera Glass ViA
- 2019: BK Jūrmala
- 2019–2020: Traiskirchen Lions
- 2020–2021: Valmiera Glass ViA
- 2021–present: BC Tallinna Kalev

Māris Ziediņš (born March 3, 1990) is a Latvian professional basketball player from Strenči, Latvia, who currently plays for BC Tallinna Kalev in the top tier Latvian–Estonian Basketball League
