= Nemanja Miljković =

Serbian basketball player (1990–2020)

Personal information
- Born: 17 May 1990 Leskovac, SR Serbia, Yugoslavia
- Died: 10 December 2020 (aged 30)
- Listed height: 2.06 m (6 ft 9 in)

Career information
- NBA draft: 2012: undrafted
- Playing career: 2008–2018
- Position: Power forward

Career history
- 2008–2009: Zemun Lasta
- 2010–2011: BC Vienna
- 2012–2013: LOGO Grosuplje
- 2013–2014: Pärnu
- 2014: Vršac
- 2014: Trikala Aries
- 2015: Levickí Patrioti
- 2015: Pärnu
- 2015–2016: Levicki Patrioti
- 2016–2017: Al Ahli
- 2017: Kumanovo
- 2018: Pärnu

Nemanja Miljković (17 May 1990 – 10 December 2020) was a Serbian professional basketball player. He played the power forward position.

Miljković died on 10 December 2020 after a long and severe illness.
