= Vytenis Čižauskas =

Lithuanian basketball player (born 1992)

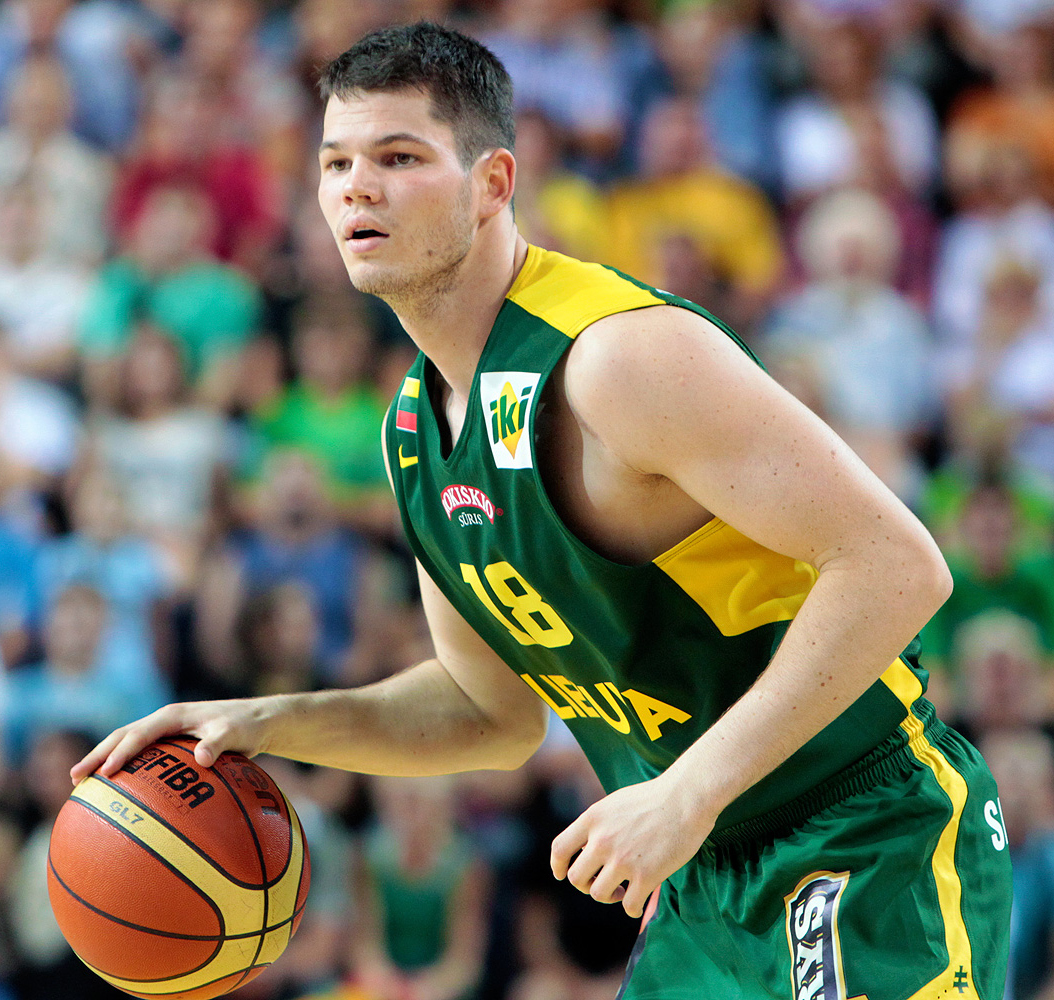
- Vytenis Čižauskas with Lithuania men's national basketball team

KK Jurbarkas Karys
- Position: Point guard
- League: NKL

Personal information
- Born: 16 September 1992 (age 34) Kaišiadorys, Lithuania
- Listed height: 6 ft 2 in (1.88 m)
- Listed weight: 177 lb (80 kg)

Career information
- NBA draft: 2014: undrafted
- Playing career: 2009–present

Career history
- 2007–2014: Žalgiris Kaunas
- 2007-2008: →Žalgiris-Arvydas Sabonis school
- 2009: →Kaunas Triobet
- 2009–2010: →Kaunas Aisčiai
- 2010–2011: →Žalgiris-Arvydas Sabonis school
- 2011: →Kėdainiai Nevėžis
- 2011–2012: →Kaunas Baltai
- 2012–2013: →CB Valladolid
- 2014: BC Lietkabelis
- 2014–2015: Valmiera/Ordo
- 2015–2016: Crailsheim Merlins
- 2016-2017: Vytautas Prienai-Birštonas
- 2017–2018: Tartu Ülikool
- 2018–2020: Akhisar Belediyespor
- 2020–2021: MKS Dąbrowa Górnicza
- 2021: Dzūkija Alytus
- 2021–2022: Nevėžis–OPTIBET
- 2022: Boulazac Basket Dordogne
- 2022-2024: CSM Constanța
- 2024-2025: BC Šiauliai
- 2025: M Basket Mažeikiai
- 2025-2026: Legnano Basket Knights
- 2026-present: Jurbarkas-Karys

Career highlights
- Baltic League champion (2017); LKL champion (2014); European Youth Olympic Festival MVP (2007)
Medals
Men's basketball
Representing Lithuania
FIBA Europe Under-20 Championship
Gold medal – first place	2012 Slovenia	U-20 Team
FIBA World Under-19 Championship
Gold medal – first place	2011 Latvia	U-19 Team
FIBA Europe Under-18 Championship
Gold medal – first place	2010 Lithuania	U-18 Team
FIBA Europe Under-16 Championship
Gold medal – first place	2008 Italy	U-16 Team
European Youth Olympic Festival
Gold medal – first place	2007 Serbia	Team competition

Vytenis Čižauskas (born 16 September 1992) is a Lithuanian professional basketball player. He plays the point guard position.

== Career ==
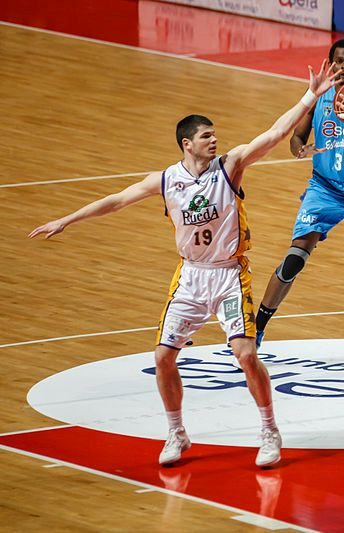
Čižauskas with CB Valladolid.

From an early age, Čižauskas played for the Žalgiris youth team. In his second season, he led the team in points and assists; as a consequence, he was promoted to Kaunas Triobet of BBL.

In March 2009, he was moved to Žalgiris' main roster; however, the young point guard saw limited playing time in the LKL. After leaving Žalgiris, Čižauskas played for various local Lithuanian team until joining CB Valladolid of Liga ACB on loan from Žalgiris. He averaged a mediocre 2.6 points per game and 0.8 assists per game coming off the bench.

In September 2013, he returned to Žalgiris and debuted in the Euroleague tournament. On 9 December 2014 he signed with Latvian team BK Valmiera.

On 1 January 2022, he has signed with Boulazac Basket Dordogne of the LNB Pro B.

== International career ==
He won five gold medals with Lithuania national teams: European Youth Summer Olympic Festival (U-15) and was named MVP in 2007, Europe U-16 in 2008, Europe U-18 in 2010, World U-19 in 2011 and Europe U-20 in 2012. He was a candidate for Lithuania national basketball team, which participated in EuroBasket 2013.
