= Branko Mirković =

Serbian-Bulgarian basketball player

Personal information
- Born: 5 October 1982 (age 44) Belgrade, SR Serbia, SFR Yugoslavia
- Listed height: 1.90 m (6 ft 3 in)
- Listed weight: 85 kg (187 lb)

Career information
- NBA draft: 2004: undrafted
- Playing career: 2003–2021
- Position: Point guard

Career history
- 2003–2005: Smederevo 1953
- 2005–2007: Pelister Bitola
- 2007–2009: Rilski Sportist
- 2009–2010: Lukoil Academic
- 2010–2011: Igokea
- 2011–2013: Rilski Sportist
- 2013–2016: Tsmoki-Minsk
- 2016–2017: CSM Oradea
- 2017–2020: BC Kalev
- 2020–2021: Pieno žvaigždės Pasvalys

Career highlights
- Balkan League champion (2009); Belarusian League champion (2014); Bulgarian League champion (2010); Estonian League champion (2017, 2018, 2019); Estonian League Finals MVP (2017, 2019); Belarusian Cup champion (2014, 2015)

Branko Mirković (Serbian Cyrillic: Бранко Мирковић, Bulgarian: Бранко Миркович; born 5 October 1982) is a Serbian-Bulgarian former professional basketball player. He played at the point guard position.

== Professional career ==
During his career, Mirković played for KK Smederevo 1953, KK Pelister, BC Rilski Sportist, PBC Lukoil Academic and KK Igokea.

On 24 July 2013 he signed with BC Tsmoki-Minsk.

On 21 June 2020 he signed with Pieno žvaigždės Pasvalys of the Lithuanian Basketball League.

== Bulgarian national basketball team ==
In 2013, Mirković accepted to play for the Bulgaria national basketball team after which he received a Bulgarian passport. With the national team, he led all players at FIBA EuroBasket 2015 qualification in minutes played, while averaging 12 points, 4 assists and 5.2 rebounds per game.

== See also ==
- List of foreign basketball players in Serbia
