= Gregorio Luperón High School for Math & Science =

Public school in New York City

Gregorio Luperón High School for Math and Science
- Secundaria Gregorio Luperón

Location
- 501 West 165th Street; New York City, (New York County), New York 10032; United States; 40°50′17″N 73°56′18″W

Information
- School type: Public (government funded), secondary (Spanish/English bilingual)
- Established: 1992
- Status: open
- School board: New York City Department of Education
- NCES District ID: 3600083
- CEEB code: 333749
- NCES School ID: 360008301265
- Principal: Yecenia Delarosa
- Faculty: 23.80 (on an FTE basis)
- Grades: 9–12
- Enrollment: 486 (2011)
  - Grade 9: 253
  - Grade 10: 79
  - Grade 11: 77
  - Grade 12: 77
- Student to teacher ratio: 20.42
- Hours in school day: 7:40–4:20
- Campus type: Urban
- Colors: White and blue
- Website: www.glhs.nyc
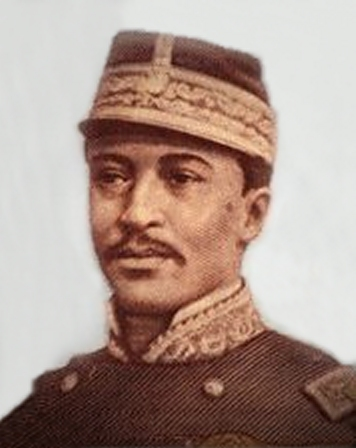
- Gregorio Luperón, the school's namesake

The Gregorio Luperón High School for Math & Science (in Spanish: Secundaria Gregorio Luperón) is located in District 6 of the borough of Manhattan, New York, United States The school is named after General Gregorio Luperón, a Dominican president, military general, businessman, liberal politician, freemason, and Statesman who was one of the leaders in the Restoration of the Dominican Republic after the Spanish annexation in 1863.

== History ==
Luperón was founded in 1992 as a transitional program for newly arrived Spanish-speaking immigrants, in 2001 it was converted into a full 4-year diploma-granting high school. It graduated its first class in 2003.

== Course offerings ==
- Aviation
- ESL
- Spanish
- Math
- Science
- Music
- Robotics
- AP Spanish Language
- AP Spanish Literature
- AP Music
- AP Biology
- AP Calculus
- AP Computer Science, in partnership with TEALS
- AP Physics

== Extracurricular activities ==
- FIRST Robotics Competition
- FIRST Tech Challenge
- Club A.M.A.S.
- Student Council
- Newspaper
- HIV/AIDS Awareness
- Karate
- Yoga
- Drama Club
- Video Production
- Baseball Team
- Volleyball Team
- Basketball Team

== New building ==
For more than twelve years, Luperón had problems with overcrowded hallways, faulty air conditioning and heating, and a lack of gym and lab facilities. Parents and students worked on a campaign to move to a larger space. After many petitions, protests, and public hearings, they achieved their goal: In 2008, a new edifice was constructed at a cost of $41 million, including not just laboratories and a gymnasium, but a larger library, better internet access, and music and art classrooms.
