= Isaiah Briscoe =

American basketball player (born 1996)

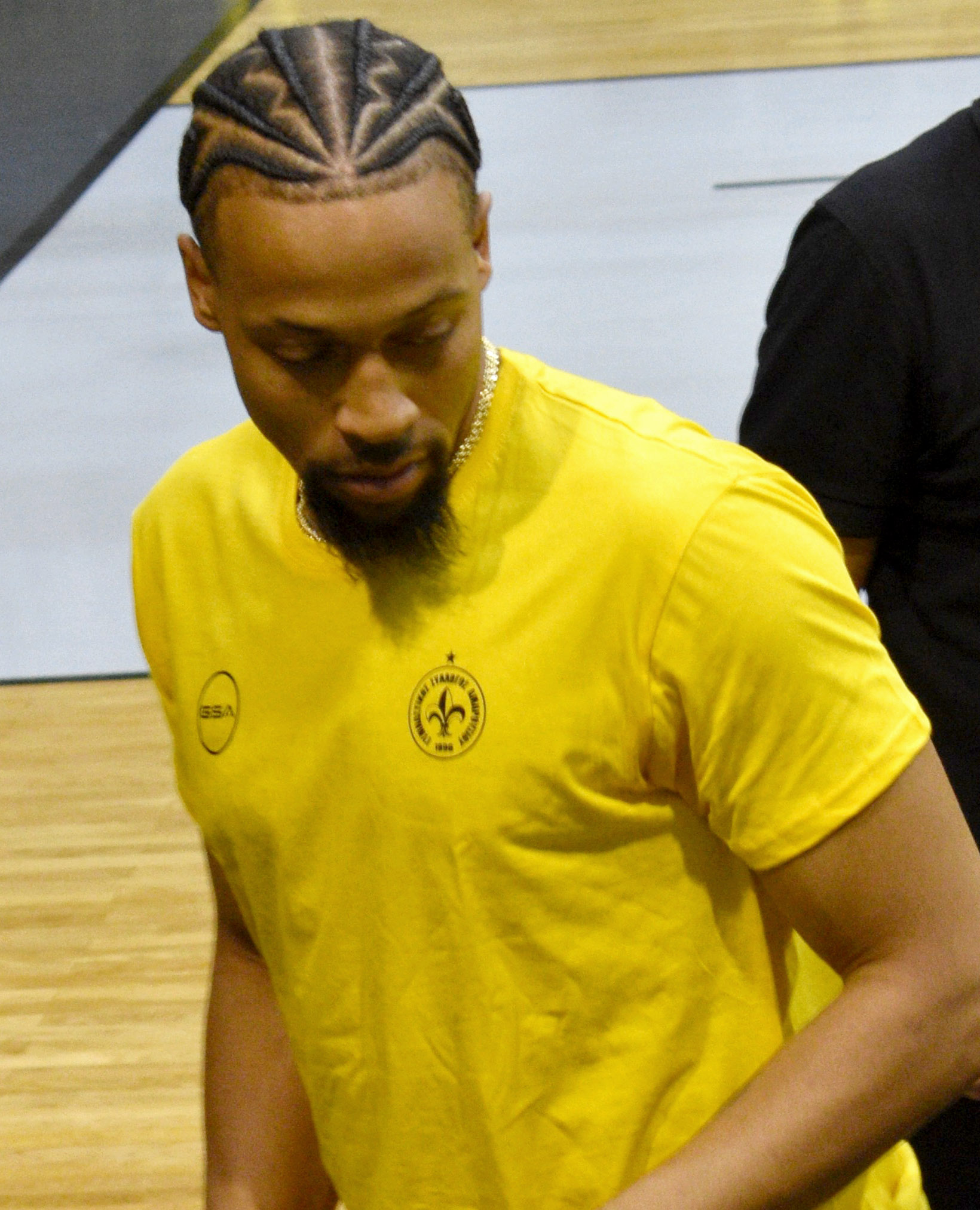
- Briscoe in 2023

No. 44 – APR
- Position: Point guard / shooting guard
- League: NBL Rwanda; BAL

Personal information
- Born: April 13, 1996 (age 30) Newark, New Jersey, U.S.
- Listed height: 6 ft 3 in (1.91 m)
- Listed weight: 227 lb (103 kg)

Career information
- High school: St. Benedict's Prep (Newark, New Jersey); Roselle Catholic (Roselle, New Jersey)
- College: Kentucky (2015–2017)
- NBA draft: 2017: undrafted
- Playing career: 2017–present

Career history
- 2017–2018: BC Kalev
- 2018–2019: Orlando Magic
- 2018: →Lakeland Magic
- 2019–2020: ratiopharm Ulm
- 2020: King Szczecin
- 2021–2022: Iowa Wolves
- 2022–2023: APU Udine
- 2023–2024: Maroussi
- 2024–2025: Kaohsiung Steelers
- 2025: Borneo Hornbills
- 2025: Jiangxi Ganchi
- 2025–2026: Fujian Sturgeons
- 2026: South China
- 2026–present: APR

Career highlights
- P. League+ points leader (2025); P. League+ assists leader (2025); NBL–China scoring leader (2025); VTB United League Young Player of the Year (2018); Estonian League champion (2018); Estonia-Latvia All Star Game MVP (2018); McDonald's All-American (2015); First-team Parade All-American (2015)
- Stats at NBA.com
- Stats at Basketball Reference
Medals
Men's basketball
Representing the United States
FIBA Americas U18 Championship
Gold medal – first place	2014 United States	National team

Isaiah Jamal Briscoe (born April 13, 1996) is an American professional basketball player for APR of the Rwanda Basketball League (RBL), and the Basketball Africa League (BAL). He was ranked among the top point guards in the national class of 2015 by Rivals.com, Scout.com and ESPN. He completed his senior year at Roselle Catholic High School in 2015, and then played two seasons of college basketball for the Kentucky Wildcats.

== Early life ==
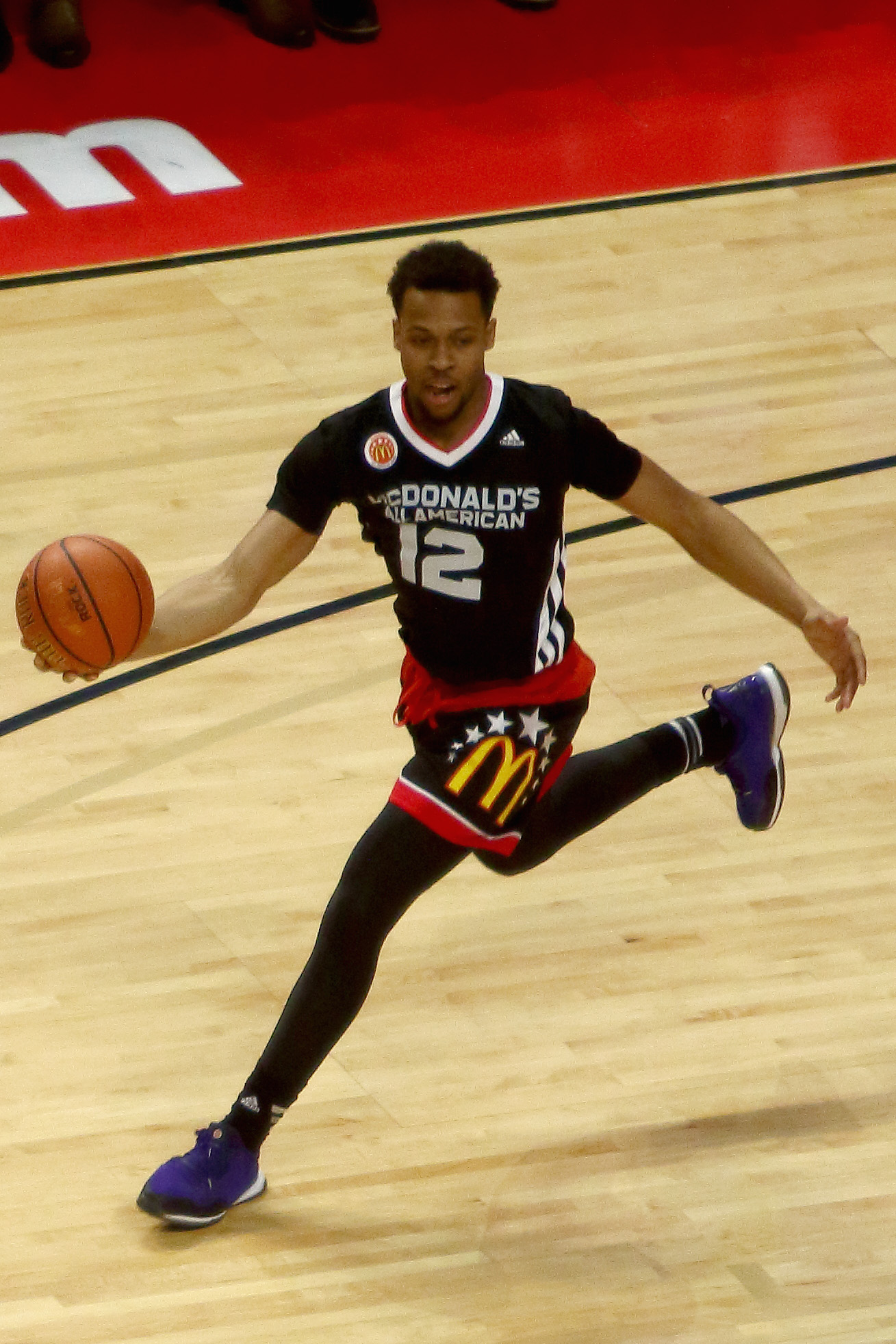
Briscoe in the 2015 McDonald's All-America game

Briscoe was born in Newark, New Jersey. He grew up in Newark until his later years when he moved to Union, New Jersey. His father, George Briscoe, is a hall of famer and former guard at Stockton State College, his sister, Iasia Hemingway, played at Syracuse University. When he was in seventh grade, he was not selected to an elite AAU team, which fueled his determination. After his eighth-grade year at Kawameeh Middle School in Union, Briscoe repeated the grade at Good Shepherd Academy in Irvington. He was invited to the LeBron James Skills Academy. Briscoe played well, using his body to get to the rim, he was advanced physically for his age. Briscoe was one of only three players from the 2015 class to be invited. After the eighth grade, He attended Saint Benedict's Preparatory School. He teamed with point guard Tyler Ennis, to lead the Gray Bees to the brink of an ESPN National High School Invitational championship. They lost on a last-second 3-pointer to Montverde Academy, 67–65. Briscoe had 11 points in the game. Isaiah averaged 15.1 points, 4.6 assists, 3.5 rebounds and 2.3 steals his sophomore season for the 32–2 Gray Bees. Briscoe transferred to Roselle Catholic High School for his junior year, where he was coached by Dave Boff. He led the team to state titles in 2014 and 2015, scoring 27 points in his final high school game to lead Roselle Catholic to a win in the state's overall Tournament of Champions. As a senior, Briscoe averaged 21 points, five rebounds and three assists per game. He models his game after Deron Williams and Tyreke Evans. Prior to his senior year, Briscoe led the AAU New Jersey Playaz to the championship at the 2014 Nike Peach Jam in South Carolina. He posted averages of 19.2 points and 5 assists over 23 total games in the Nike Elite Youth Basketball League (EYBL) in 2014. Isaiah finished as Rivals.com #10 nationally ranked player and the #1 point guard in the class of 2015.

He committed to Kentucky on November 13, 2014, live on ESPNU, becoming the third highest ranked point guard that John Calipari signed at the school. "(UK) puts me in the best position to play basketball after college," Briscoe said. "Calipari puts you on the highest stage. The last couple years, all his point guards have been in the NBA. I'm just trying to be the next one." He chose Kentucky over St. John's. He was the nation's consensus top point guard, was ranked No. 13 overall player by ESPN and Scout, No. 10 by Rivals, and No. 12 by 24/7 Sports recruiting services. He helped lead Team USA at the 2014 FIBA Americans U18 Championships to a gold medal. He was a first-team Parade All-American in 2015. He was a McDonald's All-American Game, Jordan Brand Classic, and Nike Hoop Summit game selection.

== College career ==
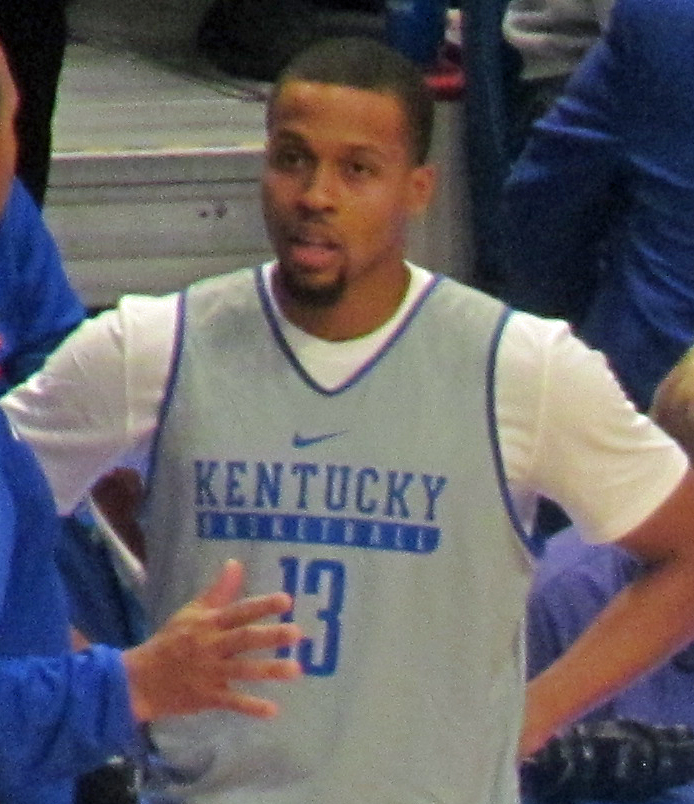
Briscoe in Kentucky's 2016 Blue-White scrimmage

As a freshman, Briscoe averaged 9.6 points and 5.3 rebounds per game. However, he struggled with his shooting particularly from outside, hitting only 14 percent of his attempts from behind the arc. Coming into his sophomore season, he worked at playing more of a point guard role. He posted 12.1 points, 5.4 rebounds, and 4.2 assists per game as a sophomore.

At the conclusion of his sophomore season, Briscoe announced that he would forgo his final two years of collegiate eligibility and enter the 2017 NBA draft joining teammates De'Aaron Fox, Malik Monk, and Bam Adebayo becoming the fourth Kentucky Wildcat to do so.

== Professional career ==
=== Kalev/Cramo (2017–2018) ===
After going undrafted in the 2017 NBA draft, Briscoe joined the Philadelphia 76ers for the 2017 NBA Summer League. In six games for the 76ers, he averaged 5.5 points and 2.2 assists per game. On September 14, 2017, he signed a training camp contract with the Portland Trail Blazers. He was waived by the Trail Blazers on October 13, 2017, after appearing in six preseason games. Briscoe signed with Estonian club Kalev/Cramo. On February 16, 2018, Briscoe scored 50 points as he took home MVP honors at the Estonia/Latvia All Star Game. On June 9, 2018, Briscoe won the VTB United League Young Player of the Year award, given to the league's best player under age 23. In the 2017–18 season Briscoe averaged 18.5 points, 3.4 rebounds, 4.2 assists, and 1.6 steals in 26.7 minutes per game.

=== Orlando Magic (2018–2019) ===
On July 6, 2018, Briscoe signed with the Orlando Magic. He made his NBA debut on October 19, 2018, recording 10 points and 3 assists off the bench in a 88–120 loss to the Charlotte Hornets. On April 4, 2019, Briscoe was waived by the Orlando Magic.

=== ratiopharm Ulm (2019–2020) ===
On October 25, 2019, ratiopharm Ulm of the Basketball Bundesliga (BBL) announced that Briscoe had signed with them. He averaged 7.6 points, 2.6 rebounds and 2.1 assists per game for the team.

=== King Szczecin (2020) ===
On February 1, 2020, he has signed with King Szczecin of the PLK. He played in three games for the team (averaging 15.7 points, 3.0 rebounds and 3.3 assists per game) before the season was shortened due to COVID-19 outbreak.

=== Iowa Wolves (2021–2022) ===
On October 26, 2021, Briscoe signed with the Iowa Wolves.

=== Kaohsiung Steelers (2024–2025) ===
On September 9, 2024, Briscoe signed with the Kaohsiung 17LIVE Steelers of the P. League+.

=== Borneo Hornbills (2025) ===
On April 26, 2025, Briscoe signed with the Borneo Hornbills of the Indonesian Basketball League (IBL), replacing Brandon McCoy.

=== Big 3 ===
Since 2023, Briscoe has been playing for the Trilogy in the Big 3 league.

== Personal life ==
Briscoe is a third cousin of Kyrie Irving.

== Career statistics ==
Legend
GP	Games played	GS	Games started	MPG	Minutes per game
FG%	Field goal percentage	3P%	3-point field goal percentage	FT%	Free throw percentage
RPG	Rebounds per game	APG	Assists per game	SPG	Steals per game
BPG	Blocks per game	PPG	Points per game	**Bold**	Career high

=== NBA ===
==== Regular season ====
Year	Team	GP	GS	MPG	FG%	3P%	FT%	RPG	APG	SPG	BPG	PPG
2018–19	Orlando	39	0	14.3	.399	.324	.577	1.9	2.2	.3	.1	3.5
Career		39	0	14.3	.399	.324	.577	1.9	2.2	.3	.1	3.5

=== College ===
Year	Team	GP	GS	MPG	FG%	3P%	FT%	RPG	APG	SPG	BPG	PPG
2015–16	Kentucky	34	33	**32.2**	.439	.135	.460	5.3	3.1	**1.0**	.1	9.6
2016–17	Kentucky	**36**	**36**	30.4	**.470**	**.288**	**.635**	**5.4**	**4.2**	.8	**.2**	**12.1**
Career		70	69	31.3	.455	.229	.555	5.4	3.7	.9	.2	10.9
