= Heiko Niidas =

Estonian basketball player

No. 15 – Tallinna Kalev
- Position: Center
- League: KML

Personal information
- Born: 15 March 1983 (age 43) Tallinn, then part of Estonian SSR, Soviet Union
- Listed height: 6 ft 9 in (2.06 m)

Career information
- Playing career: 2001–2009

Heiko Niidas (born 15 March 1983) is a former Estonian professional basketball player. Niidas debuted in Korvpalli Meistriliiga in 2001. He won Estonian league title in 2003, 2005 and 2006 and cup in 2005 and 2006. He belonged to the Estonian national team from 2003 to 2006. Niidas ended his basketball career at the age of 26 due to injuries.
