= Reimo Tamm =

Estonian basketball player (born 1984)

No. 11 – BC Tallinna Kalev
- Position: Point guard
- League: Korvpalli Meistriliiga, Baltic Basketball League

Personal information
- Born: December 29, 1984 (age 41) Viljandi, then part of Estonian SSR, Soviet Union
- Listed height: 6 ft 1 in (1.85 m)
- Listed weight: 191 lb (87 kg)

Career information
- Playing career: 2003–present

Career history
- 2003–2005: Ehitustööriist
- 2005–2006: BC Kalev/Cramo
- 2006–2007: BC Kalev/Rapla
- 2007–2008: BC Kraft Mööbel/Kohila
- 2008–2010: TTÜ KK
- 2010–2012: BC Kalev/Cramo
- 2012–2013: BC Rakvere Tarvas
- 2013–present: BC Tallinna Kalev

Career highlights
- Estonian Champion (2005, 2006, 2011, 2012); Estonian Cup (2005, 2006, 2012); BBL Cup: 2012

Reimo Tamm (born 29 December 1984 in Viljandi) is an Estonian professional basketball player. He plays for the Estonian club BC Tallinna Kalev at the point guard position. He has been a member of the Estonia national basketball team.

== Honours ==
- Korvpalli Meistriliiga: 2005, 2006, 2011, 2012
- Estonian Basketball Cup: 2005, 2006, 2012
- BBL Cup: 2012
