= Indrek Kajupank =

Estonian basketball player

No. 22 – Rapla
- Position: Small forward / power forward
- League: Latvian-Estonian Basketball League

Personal information
- Born: 15 May 1988 (age 38) Kihelkonna, Estonia
- Listed height: 2.00 m (6 ft 7 in)
- Listed weight: 98 kg (216 lb)

Career information
- NBA draft: 2010: undrafted
- Playing career: 2008–present

Career history
- 2005–2007: Kuressaare SK
- 2006–2008: Audentes/Noortekoondis
- 2007–2008: Triobet/Dalkia
- 2008–2010: Kalev/Cramo
- 2009–2010: → Kalev II
- 2010–2013: Rapla KK
- 2013–2015: Kalev/Cramo
- 2014: → Kalev II
- 2015–2020: Rapla
- 2020–2022: TalTech
- 2022–2023: BC Tallinna Kalev
- 2024–present: Rapla

Career highlights
- 3× KML champion (2009–2013–2014); 2xAll-KML Team (2016–2017)

Indrek Kajupank (born 15 May 1988) is an Estonian professional basketball player for BC Tallinna Kalev of the Latvian-Estonian Basketball League. He is a 2.00 m (6 ft 7 in) tall small forward and power forward. He also represents the Estonian national basketball team internationally.

== Awards and accomplishments ==
=== Professional career ===
Kalev

- 3× Estonian League champion:2009, 2013, 2014

=== Individual ===
- 2xAll-KML Team: 2016–2017
