= Bamba Fall =

Senegalese basketball player (born 1986)

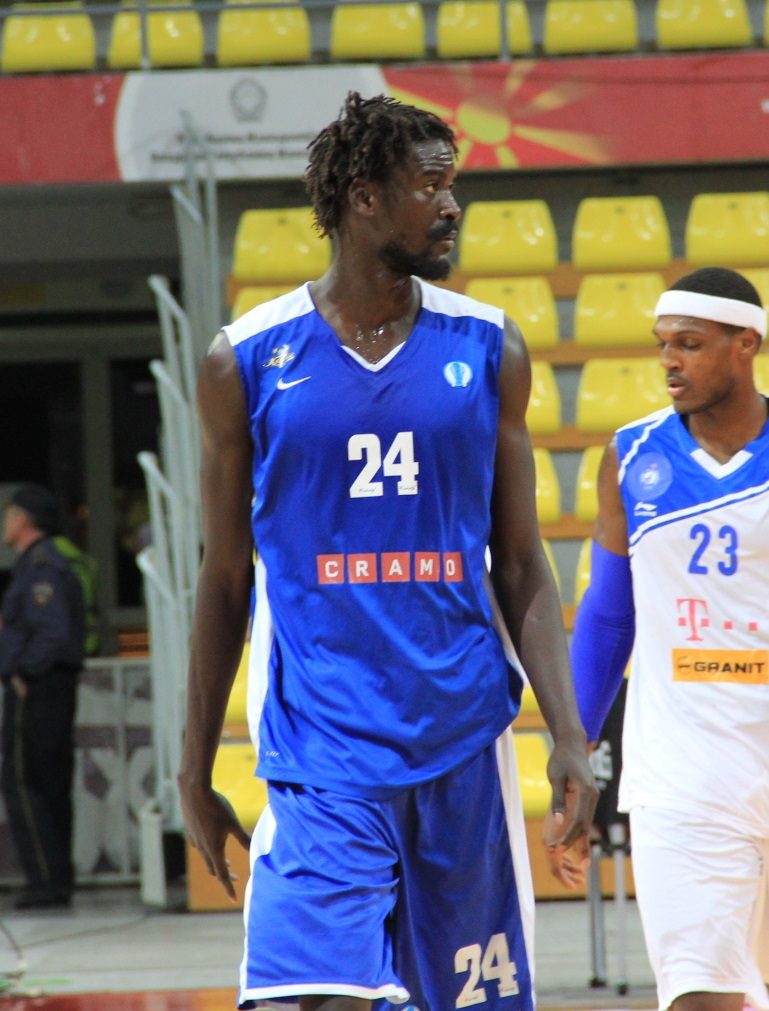
- Fall with BC Kalev/Cramo against MZT Skopje in November 2013

Palencia Baloncesto
- Position: Center
- League: LEB Oro

Personal information
- Born: May 27, 1986 (age 40) Saint-Louis, Senegal
- Listed height: 7 ft 1 in (2.16 m)
- Listed weight: 236 lb (107 kg)

Career information
- High school: Oak Hill Academy (Mouth of Wilson, Virginia)
- College: SMU (2005–2009)
- NBA draft: 2008: undrafted
- Playing career: 2009–present

Career history
- 2009: Hapoel Afula
- 2009: Hapoel Gilboa Galil
- 2009–2010: Hapoel Lev Hasharon
- 2010–2011: Maine Red Claws
- 2011–2014: BC Kalev
- 2014–2015: VEF Rīga
- 2015: Sigal Prishtina
- 2015–2017: Azad University
- 2017–2019: TLÜ/Kalev
- 2019–2020: Fundación Lucentum
- 2020–2021: Fundación CB Granada
- 2020–2021: Palencia Baloncesto

Career highlights
- LBL champion (2015); 3x Estonian champion (2012–2014); All-KML First Team (2013); All-KML Defensive Team (2012); KML Defensive Player of the Year (2012); VTB United League blocks leader (2013)

Bamba Fall (born May 27, 1986) is a Senegalese professional basketball player who currently plays for Fundación CB Granada of the Spanish LEB Oro league. He played college basketball for the Southern Methodist University and represents the Senegal national basketball team in international competition.

== College career ==
Fall attended Oak Hill Academy from 2003 to 2005. While at Oak Hill, the team finished ranked #1 in the country both years Fall attended. Fall began attending SMU in 2005 and since then has played in 43 games (18 as a freshman, 25 as a sophomore) and averaged a career high of 7.1 points per game in 2006-2007 while also leading Conference USA in blocked shots (19th nationally). He was also voted to the conference all-defensive team in 2006–2007.

== International career ==
Chosen to represent Senegal in July 2007, Fall was the youngest player on the Senegalese national team that finished in ninth place at the FIBA Africa Championship 2007 in Angola.

== Professional career ==
Fall started his professional career in Israel where he signed for Hapoel Afula from the Israeli Basketball Super League in September 2009, but was released before he played for the team and moved to Hapoel Gilboa Galil, where he played one game before being released again.

Then he moved to Hapoel Lev Hasharon from the National League where he averaged 12.8 pts and 9.4 rebounds in 27 minutes of play in a span of 12 games, which followed in him choosing to leave in order to go back to Senegal to obtain a new visa in order to finish his season in the NBA Development League.

In August 2011, Fall signed a three-year contract with BC Kalev/Cramo of Estonia. He was chosen as the KML Defensive Player of the Year after his first season with the team.

In July 2014, he signed with the Latvian team VEF Rīga.

In October 2017, Fall signed TLÜ/Kalev, team in Estonian Korvpalli Meistriliiga (KML).

In September 2019, he signed with a basketball team HLA Alicante (LEB Oro), Spain

In August 2020, he signed with Fundación CB Granada (LEB Oro), Spain

In July 2021, he signed with Palencia Baloncesto (LEB Oro), Spain
