= 2025–26 Latvian–Estonian Basketball League =

Optibet Latvian–Estonian Basketball League^{1}
- Season: 2025–26
- Duration: 30 September 2025 – 8 April 2026
- Teams: 14
- TV partners: Delfi TV, Inspira, TV4, Best4Sport TV

Regular season
- Season MVP: (Estonia) Karl Johan Lips

Finals
- Champions: (Latvia) Valmiera Glass VIA
- Runners-up: (Estonia) Tartu Ülikool Maks & Moorits
- Third place: (Latvia) VEF Rīga
- Fourth place: (Estonia) Kalev/Cramo
- Finals MVP: (New Zealand) Aniwaniwa Tait-Jones

Statistical leaders
Rebounds	(United States) Thompson	10.7
Assists	(Lithuania) Stenionis	7.6

Records
- Biggest home win: Kalev/Cramo 123–65 Keila Coolbet (15 November 2025)
- Biggest away win: Viimsi 69–108 TalTech/ALEXELA (2 November 2025)
- Highest scoring: Keila KK 119–115 Latvijas Universitāte (7 March 2026)
- Highest attendance: 3,123; Rīgas Zeļļi 90–74 Viimsi (10 January 2026)
- Lowest attendance: 70; Latvijas Universitāte 91–77 Viimsi (14 March 2026)

The 2025–26 Latvian–Estonian Basketball League, known as Optibet Latvian-Estonian Basketball League for sponsorship reasons, is the eighth season of the Latvian–Estonian Basketball League, the premier basketball competition for men's teams in Latvia and Estonia.

== Teams ==
The number of teams decreased from 15 to 14, due to Utilitas Rapla leaving the league.

=== Venues and locations ===
Location of teams in 2025–26 Latvian–Estonian Basketball League

Team	Home city	Arena	Capacity
(Latvia) BK Liepāja	Liepāja	Liepāja Olympic Center	2,542
(Latvia) BK Ogre	Ogre	Arēna Ogre	1,700
(Latvia) BK Ventspils	Ventspils	Ventspils Olympic Center	3,085
(Estonia) Kalev/Cramo	Tallinn	Tondiraba Sports Center	7,700
(Estonia) Kalev/Cramo	Tallinn	Kalev Sports Hall	1,700
(Estonia) Kalev/Cramo	Tallinn	Nord Sports Hall	1,066
(Estonia) Keila Coolbet	Keila	Keila Health Center	800
(Estonia) Keila KK	Keila	Keila Health Center	800
(Latvia) Latvijas Universitāte	Riga	O. Kalpaka RTDP	258
(Latvia) Rīgas Zeļļi	Riga	Latvian Team Sports Hall	3,000
(Estonia) TalTech/ALEXELA	Tallinn	TalTech Sports Hall	1,000
(Estonia) Tartu Ülikool Maks & Moorits	Tartu	University of Tartu Sports Hall	2,600
(Estonia) Transcom Pärnu	Pärnu	Pärnu Sports Hall	1,820
(Latvia) Valmiera Glass VIA	Valmiera	Valmiera Olympic Center	1,500
(Latvia) VEF Rīga	Riga	Rimi Olympic Sports Center	830
(Estonia) Viimsi	Haabneeme	Forus Sports Center	500

=== Coaching changes ===
Pre-season
Team	Outgoing coach	Incoming coach
(Latvia) Valmiera Glass VIA	(Latvia) Nikolajs Mazurs	(Latvia) Kaspars Vecvagars
(Latvia) Latvijas Universitāte	(Latvia) Gunārs Gailītis	(Latvia) Marts Ozolinkēvičs
In-season
Team	Outgoing coach	Incoming coach
(Estonia) Kalev/Cramo	(Estonia) Indrek Reinbok	(Finland) Anton Mirolybov
(Latvia) Rīgas Zeļļi	(Latvia) Juris Umbraško	(Latvia) Dāvis Čoders

== Regular season ==
=== League table ===
Pos	Team	Pld	W	L	PF	PA	PD	PCT	Qualification
1	(Estonia) Tartu Ülikool Maks & Moorits	26	21	5	2226	2047	+179	.808	Qualification to play-offs
2	(Latvia) VEF Rīga	26	21	5	2334	2025	+309	.808	Qualification to play-offs
3	(Latvia) Valmiera Glass VIA	26	20	6	2422	2102	+320	.769	Qualification to play-offs
4	(Estonia) Kalev/Cramo	26	20	6	2505	2108	+397	.769	Qualification to play-offs
5	(Latvia) Rīgas Zeļļi	26	20	6	2374	2072	+302	.769	Qualification to play-offs
6	(Estonia) TalTech/ALEXELA	26	17	9	2199	2121	+78	.654	Qualification to play-offs
7	(Latvia) BK Ventspils	26	17	9	2348	2199	+149	.654	Qualification to play-offs
8	(Estonia) Transcom Pärnu	26	11	15	2055	2066	−11	.423	Qualification to play-offs
9	(Latvia) BK Ogre	26	11	15	2149	2126	+23	.423	
10	(Estonia) Viimsi	26	7	19	1942	2308	−366	.269	
11	(Latvia) BK Liepāja	26	5	21	2085	2294	−209	.192	
12	(Estonia) Keila KK	26	5	21	2140	2491	−351	.192	
13	(Latvia) Latvijas Universitāte	26	4	22	2132	2536	−404	.154	
14	(Estonia) Keila Coolbet	26	3	23	2048	2464	−416	.115	

Updated to match(es) played on 13 March 2026. Source: EstLatBL.com

=== Results ===
Home \ Away	BKL	OGR	BKV	KAL	KCB	KEI	LAT	ZEL	TCH	TRT	PRN	VAL	VEF	VMS
BK Liepāja	—	80–83	82–89	94–97	96–89	82–86	84–103	77–79	71–80	81–87	83–90	78–83	74–86	80–83
BK Ogre	76–83	—	70–71	111–101	95–66	112–99	101–106	65–87	76–78	78–83	71–60	90–77	92–94	77–67
BK Ventspils	104–69	83–85	—	84–109	95–83	117–93	105–88	100–95	80–84	75–85	80–71	85–99	78–87	113–88
Kalev/Cramo	99–73	104–93	92–99	—	123–65	117–70	95–58	72–100	91–78	68–80	100–81	99–87	92–88	110–73
Keila Coolbet	88–91	71–97	80–81	68–111	—	93–83	91–81	88–102	79–90	65–95	64–81	74–110	89–99	62–75
Keila KK	79–89	74–90	80–84	73–98	96–90	—	119–115	69–91	79–81	93–96	70–97	74–96	80–105	82–77
Latvijas Universitāte	83–102	68–81	96–118	67–102	101–96	75–103	—	65–109	61–81	83–119	73–97	70–98	73–89	91–77
Rīgas Zeļļi	109–76	90–83	81–90	70–92	94–83	108–73	99–77	—	96–65	76–78	83–75	82–80	80–77	90–74
TalTech/ALEXELA	95–76	80–77	86–80	84–98	86–63	110–82	109–92	86–95	—	77–82	86–78	83–91	75–102	86–55
Tartu Ülikool Maks & Moorits	87–77	65–59	71–106	72–85	90–79	89–83	103–86	83–80	76–78	—	83–71	86–81	95–78	89–57
Transcom Pärnu	85–69	85–71	73–82	78–86	98–82	76–72	72–71	76–83	76–83	70–91	—	62–78	62–72	88–75
Valmiera Glass VIA	95–81	86–65	93–99	90–79	97–80	86–81	114–94	121–103	96–78	99–79	92–85	—	110–77	90–64
VEF Rīga	83–71	90–74	76–69	90–85	105–62	122–74	87–78	88–97	98–72	76–67	90–80	85–74	—	83–60
Viimsi	76–71	78–77	83–81	82–100	92–98	95–73	85–77	64–95	69–108	86–93	76–88	69–99	62–107	—

Updated to match(es) played on 4 March 2026. Source: EstLatBL.com
Legend: Blue = home team win; Red = away team win.
Matches with lighter background shading were decided after overtime.

== Play-offs ==
=== Quarter-finals ===
Team 1	Agg.	Team 2	1st leg	2nd leg	3rd leg
Tartu Ülikool Maks & Moorits (Estonia)	2–0	(Estonia) Transcom Pärnu	80–71	89–88 (OT)	
VEF Rīga (Latvia)	2–1	(Latvia) BK Ventspils	77–54	69–72	90–71
Valmiera GLASS VIA (Latvia)	2–0	(Estonia) TalTech/ALEXELA	105–80	83–74	
Kalev/Cramo (Estonia)	2–1	(Latvia) Rīgas Zeļļi	69–83	93–86	102–100 (OT)

==== Tartu Ülikool Maks & Moorits vs. Transcom Pärnu ====
20 March 2025	Tartu Ülikool Maks & Moorits (Estonia)	80–71 (Series: 1–0)	(Estonia) Transcom Pärnu	Tartu
19:00	Scoring by quarter: 12–21, 25–20, 22–13, 21–17
	Pts: Bernard 23; Rebs: Lips 16; Asts: Bernard 8 PIR: Bernard 32	Boxscore	Pts: Harris 23; Rebs: Eelmäe 7 Asts: Harris 5 PIR: Harris 25	Arena: University of Tartu Sports Hall; Attendance: 1,667; Referees: I. Kitsing, R. Baumanis, R. Konks

23 March 2025	Transcom Pärnu (Estonia)	88–89(OT) (Series: 0–2)	(Estonia) Tartu Ülikool Maks & Moorits	Pärnu
20:00	Scoring by quarter: 20–16, 15–13, 20–23, 19–22, Overtime: 14–15
	Pts: Harris, Mohamed 23; Rebs: Eelmäe 8 Asts: Harris 7 PIR: Mohamed 26	Boxscore	Pts: Ilver 29; Rebs: Bernard 10; Asts: Bernard 7 PIR: Bernard 35	Arena: Pärnu Sports Hall; Attendance: 888; Referees: G. Salinš, R. Helmšteins, A. Mohov

==== VEF Rīga vs. BK Ventspils ====
18 March 2025	VEF Rīga (Latvia)	77–54 (Series: 1–0)	(Latvia) BK Ventspils	Riga
19:30	Scoring by quarter: 19–18, 23–13, 11–10, 24–13
	Pts: Ķilps 14; Rebs: Huffman 10; Asts: Stokes 5 PIR: Hollis, Huffman 18	Boxscore	Pts: Cash 13; Rebs: Thomas 9 Asts: Birkāns 7 PIR: Cash 12	Arena: Rimi Olympic Center; Attendance: 595; Referees: H. Laas, J. Rozenbergs, R. Repelis

22 March 2025	BK Ventspils (Latvia)	72–69 (Series: 1–1)	(Latvia) VEF Rīga	Ventspils
17:00	Scoring by quarter: 23–18, 11–24, 23–15, 15–12
	Pts: Shelton 19; Rebs: Thomas 10; Asts: Zaķis 5 PIR: Thomas 26	Boxscore	Pts: Ķilps 15; Rebs: Ročak 9 Asts: Hollis, Stokes 4 PIR: Huffman 18	Arena: Ventspils Olympic Center; Attendance: 612; Referees: M. Kozlovskis, M. Uuehendrik, A. Mohov

24 March 2025	VEF Rīga (Latvia)	90–71 (Series: 2–1)	(Latvia) BK Ventspils	Riga
19:00	Scoring by quarter: 29–23, 19–27, 19–5, 23–16
	Pts: Hollis, Huffman 19; Rebs: three players 9 Asts: four players 4 PIR: Hollis 30	Boxscore	Pts: Shelton 16; Rebs: Shelton 10; Asts: Shelton 6 PIR: Shelton 27	Arena: Rimi Olympic Center; Attendance: 667; Referees: G. Salins, M. Kozlovskis, I. Kitsing

==== Valmiera Glass VIA vs. TalTech/ALEXELA ====
18 March 2025	Valmiera Glass VIA (Latvia)	105–80 (Series: 1–0)	(Estonia) TalTech/ALEXELA	Valmiera
19:00	Scoring by quarter: 22–19, 33–21, 19–19, 31–21
	Pts: Kohs 19; Rebs: Kohs 7 Asts: Stenionis; PIR: Kohs 30	Boxscore	Pts: Post 16; Rebs: Metsalu 6 Asts: Metsalu 5 PIR: Metsalu 21	Arena: Valmiera Olympic Center; Attendance: 882; Referees: M. Uuehendrik, M. Rozenfelds, I. Kitsing

23 March 2025	TalTech/ALEXELA (Estonia)	74–83 (Series: 0–2)	(Latvia) Valmiera Glass VIA	Tallinn
18:30	Scoring by quarter: 19–27, 21–17, 20–22, 14–17
	Pts: Pehka 18; Rebs: Jurkatamm 10; Asts: Välb 5 PIR: Sutt 15	Boxscore	Pts: Pacher 28; Rebs: four players 7 Asts: Vītols 7 PIR: Pacher 37	Arena: TalTech Sports Hall; Attendance: 496; Referees: A. Aunkroger, R. Värv, A. Petrovs

==== Kalev/Cramo vs. Rīgas Zeļļi ====
20 March 2025	Kalev/Cramo (Estonia)	69–83 (Series: 0–1)	(Latvia) Rīgas Zeļļi	Tallinn
19:30	Scoring by quarter: 21–16, 16–18, 18–26, 14–23
	Pts: Toom 18; Rebs: Toom 8 Asts: Kaukiainen 5 PIR: Toom 17	Boxscore	Pts: Fidler 26; Rebs: Anigwe 11; Asts: Lukashov 6 PIR: Fidler 35	Arena: Nord Sports Hall; Attendance: 826; Referees: R. Värv, E. Tukiss, J. Bruveris

22 March 2025	Rīgas Zeļļi (Latvia)	86–93 (Series: 1–1)	(Estonia) Kalev/Cramo	Riga
19:00	Scoring by quarter: 21–27, 22–26, 23–17, 20–23
	Pts: Fidler 21; Rebs: Mačoha 8 Asts: Fidler 6 PIR: Mačoha 23	Boxscore	Pts: Rosenthal 22; Rebs: Toom 7 Asts: Rosenthal 7 PIR: Rosenthal 29	Arena: Daugava Sports Hall; Attendance: 579; Referees: O. Latisevs, H. Laas, R. Konks

25 March 2025	Kalev/Cramo (Estonia)	102–100(OT) (Series: 2–1)	(Latvia) Rīgas Zeļļi	Tallinn
19:00	Scoring by quarter: 24–21, 23–26, 20–22, 20–18, Overtime: 15–13
	Pts: Toom 22; Rebs: Jelks 8 Asts: Kaukiainen 7 PIR: Miška 21	Boxscore	Pts: Fidler 25; Rebs: Fidler 12; Asts: Lukashov, Shabazz 5 PIR: Fidler 29	Arena: Nord Sports Hall; Attendance: 1,014; Referees: R. Värv, R. Helmšteins, R. Repelis

=== Semi-finals ===
Team 1	Agg.	Team 2	1st leg	2nd leg	3rd leg
Tartu Ülikool Maks & Moorits (Estonia)	2–1	(Estonia) Kalev/Cramo	98–85	83–86	89–81
VEF Rīga (Latvia)	1–2	(Latvia) Valmiera Glass VIA	79–67	83–97	87–89

==== Tartu Ülikool Maks & Moorits vs. Kalev/Cramo ====
28 March 2025	Tartu Ülikool Maks & Moorits (Estonia)	98–85 (Series: 1–0)	(Estonia) Kalev/Cramo	Tartu
19:00	Scoring by quarter: 22–19, 26–29, 27–26, 23–11
	Pts: Ilver 25; Rebs: Lips 15; Asts: Lips 7 PIR: Ilver 38	Boxscore	Pts: Kaukiainen 17; Rebs: Rosenthal 8 Asts: Kaukiainen 4 PIR: Acuff 20	Arena: University of Tartu Sports Hall; Attendance: 2,118; Referees: O. Latisevs, R. Konks, A. Mohov

1 April 2025	Kalev/Cramo (Estonia)	86–83 (Series: 1–1)	(Estonia) Tartu Ülikool Maks & Moorits	Tallinn
19:00	Scoring by quarter: 22–13, 21–22, 20–30, 21—16
	Pts: Makke 18; Rebs: Miška 10; Asts: Rosenthal 5 PIR: Miška 16	Boxscore	Pts: Lips 25; Rebs: Lips 14; Asts: Paasoja, Lips 4 PIR: Lips 44	Arena: Nord Sports Hall; Attendance: 1,093; Referees: M. Männiste, M. Volskis, M. Senkevičs

3 April 2025	Tartu Ülikool Maks & Moorits (Estonia)	89–81 (Series: 2–1)	(Estonia) Kalev/Cramo	Tartu
19:00	Scoring by quarter: 15–30, 28–16, 26–16, 20–19
	Pts: Painter 29; Rebs: Lips 13; Asts: Bernard 5 PIR: Painter 47	Boxscore	Pts: Toom 24; Rebs: Jelks 12; Asts: Rosenthal 6 PIR: Toom 26	Arena: University of Tartu Sports Hall; Attendance: 2,707; Referees: M. Männiste, M. Rozenfelds, R. Konks

==== VEF Rīga vs. Valmiera Glass Via ====
29 March 2025	VEF Rīga (Latvia)	79–67 (Series: 1–0)	(Latvia) Valmiera Glass VIA	Riga
17:00	Scoring by quarter: 21–18, 20–20, 23–18, 15–11
	Pts: Hollis 17; Rebs: Huffman 16; Asts: Stokes 6 PIR: Huffman 33	Boxscore	Pts: Pajić 14; Rebs: Pajić 10; Asts: Stenionis 8 PIR: Kohs 18	Arena: Rimi Olympic Center; Attendance: 926; Referees: A. Aunkrogers, I. Kitsing, E. Binders-Coders

1 April 2025	Valmiera Glass VIA (Latvia)	97–83 (Series: 1–1)	(Latvia) VEF Rīga	Valmiera
19:00	Scoring by quarter: 16–26, 23–22, 33–18, 25–17
	Pts: Stenionis 25; Rebs: Pajić 12; Asts: Vītols, Stenionis 5 PIR: Stenionis 35	Boxscore	Pts: Ročak 19; Rebs: Huffman 7 Asts: Stokes 4 PIR: Ročak 19	Arena: Valmiera Olympic Center; Attendance: 1,416; Referees: H. Laas, J. Rozenbergs, M. Uuehendrik

3 April 2025	VEF Rīga (Latvia)	87–89 (Series: 1–2)	(Latvia) Valmiera Glass VIA	Riga
16:00	Scoring by quarter: 15–28, 29–13, 20–20, 23–28
	Pts: Huffman 25; Rebs: Huffman 16; Asts: Būmeisters 6 PIR: Huffman 45	Boxscore	Pts: three players 16; Rebs: Tait-Jones 7 Asts: Stenionis 8 PIR: Stenionis, Tait-Jones 22	Arena: Rimi Olympic Center; Attendance: 938; Referees: G. Saliņš, I. Kitsing, R. Helmšteins

=== Bronze medal game ===
==== VEF Rīga vs. Kalev/Cramo ====
7 April 2026	VEF Rīga (Latvia)	87–72	(Estonia) Kalev/Cramo	Riga
19:00	Scoring by quarter: 19–22, 22–18, 22–10, 24–22
	Pts: Huffman 23; Rebs: Huffman 10; Asts: Andževs 4 PIR: Hollis, Huffman 32	Boxscore	Pts: Miška 15; Rebs: Jelks 7 Asts: Makke, Miška 4 PIR: Miška 18	Arena: Rimi Olympic Center; Attendance: 418; Referees: E. Binders-Coders, R. Konks, A. Mohov

=== Final ===
==== Tartu Ülikool Maks & Moorits vs. Valmiera Glass VIA ====
8 April 2026	Tartu Ülikool Maks & Moorits (Estonia)	95–100	(Latvia) Valmiera Glass VIA	Tartu
19:00	Scoring by quarter: 26–26, 17–29, 34–22, 18–23
	Pts: McBride 25; Rebs: Lips 10; Asts: Bernard, Lips 6 PIR: Lips 23	Boxscore	Pts: Tait-Jones 27; Rebs: Tait-Jones 13; Asts: Stenionis 7 PIR: Tait-Jones 35	Arena: University of Tartu Sports Hall; Attendance: 2,865; Referees: R. Helmšteins, M. Uuehendrik, E. Tukišs

== Bracket ==
Quarter-finals
1	(Estonia) Tartu Ülikool Maks & Moorits	2
8	(Estonia) Transcom Pärnu	0
4	(Estonia) Kalev/Cramo	2
5	(Latvia) Rīgas Zeļļi	1
2	(Latvia) VEF Rīga	2
7	(Latvia) BK Ventspils	1
3	(Latvia) Valmiera Glass VIA	2
6	(Estonia) TalTech/ALEXELA	0

Semi-finals
1	(Estonia) Tartu Ülikool Maks & Moorits	2
4	(Estonia) Kalev/Cramo	1
2	(Latvia) VEF Rīga	1
3	(Latvia) Valmiera Glass VIA	2

Finals
1	(Estonia) Tartu Ülikool Maks & Moorits	95
3	(Latvia) Valmiera Glass VIA	100
Third place
2	(Latvia) VEF Rīga	87
4	(Estonia) Kalev/Cramo	72

== Awards ==
=== Regular Season MVP ===
- (Estonia) Karl Johan Lips ( (Estonia) Tartu Ülikool Maks & Moorits)

=== Finals MVP ===
- (New Zealand) Aniwaniwa Tait-Jones ( (Latvia) Valmiera Glass VIA)

=== All-Star Five ===
Pos.	Player	Team
PG	(Lithuania) Dominykas Stenionis	(Latvia) Valmiera Glass VIA
SF	(Estonia) Hugo Toom	(Estonia) Kalev/Cramo
PF	(Estonia) Karl Johan Lips	(Estonia) Tartu Ülikool Maks & Moorits
PF	(Estonia) Markus Ilver	(Estonia) Tartu Ülikool Maks & Moorits
C	(United States) Brandon Huffman	(Latvia) VEF Rīga

=== MVP of the Month ===
Month	Player	Team	Ref.
October	(Lithuania) Dominykas Stenionis	(Latvia) Valmiera Glass VIA	
November	(United States) Frankie Fidler	(Latvia) Rīgas Zeļļi	
December	(United States) Cameron Shelton	(Latvia) BK Ventspils	
January	(Latvia) Anrijs Miška	(Estonia) Kalev/Cramo	
February	(Estonia) Karl Johan Lips	(Estonia) Tartu Ülikool Maks & Moorits	

== Attendances to arenas ==
=== Average attendances ===
Pos	Team	Total	High	Low	Average
1	Tartu Ülikool Maks & Moorits	24,841	2,865	746	1,461
2	Rīgas Zeļļi	14,493	3,123	323	1,035
3	Transcom Pärnu	11,524	1,580	485	823
4	Valmiera Glass VIA	12,241	1,416	504	816
5	Kalev/Cramo	11,637	1,482	373	727
6	TalTech/ALEXELA	9,802	2,128	426	700
7	BK Ventspils	9,188	1,078	457	656
8	VEF Rīga	9,651	938	268	536
9	BK Ogre	6,932	1,234	350	533
10	BK Liepāja	5,697	900	167	438
11	Viimsi	4,472	507	241	344
12	Keila KK	4,299	671	178	330
13	Keila Coolbet	4,177	853	160	321
14	Latvijas Universitāte	2,076	315	70	159
	League total	131,030	3,123	70	634

Source: EstLatBL.com

== Clubs in European competitions ==
FIBA competitions
Team	Competition	Progress
(Latvia) VEF Rīga	Champions League	Regular season
(Estonia) Kalev/Cramo	Champions League	Qualifying round
(Estonia) Kalev/Cramo	FIBA Europe Cup	Regular season
(Estonia) Tartu Ülikool Maks & Moorits	FIBA Europe Cup	Regular season
(Estonia) Transcom Pärnu	FIBA Europe Cup	Qualifying round

Regional competitions
Team	Competition	Progress
(Latvia) Rīgas Zeļļi	European North Basketball League	Quarter-finals
(Estonia) TalTech/ALEXELA	European North Basketball League	Round of 16
(Latvia) Valmiera Glass VIA	European North Basketball League	Round of 16
(Estonia) Keila Coolbet	European North Basketball League	Regular season

== See also ==
- 2026 KML Playoffs
