= 2025–26 Estonian Basketball Cup =

Tournament details
- Country: Estonia
- Dates: 16–21 February 2026
- Teams: 8
- Defending champions: Kalev/Cramo

Final positions
- Champions: Tartu Ülikool Maks & Moorits
- Runners-up: Kalev/Cramo
- Third place: TalTech/ALEXELA

Tournament statistics
- Attendance: 5,843

Awards
- MVP: (Estonia) Karl Johan Lips

The 2025–26 Estonian Basketball Cup, also known as Utilitas Basketball Cup for sponsorship reasons, was the 59th edition of the Estonian Basketball Cup.

Kalev/Cramo was the defending champions. Tartu Ülikool Maks & Moorits won the cup by defeating Kalev/Cramo in the final game 86–75. Tartu won the cup after a five year break since their last triumph was in 2021.

== Bracket ==
Quarterfinals; 16–17 February
Kalev/Cramo	109
Hepa Rapla	64
Transcom Pärnu	75
Keila Coolbet	79
Tartu Ülikool Maks & Moorits	83
Keila KK	61
TalTech/ALEXELA	95
Viimsi	76

Semifinals; 18–19 February
Kalev/Cramo	107
Keila Coolbet	78
Tartu Ülikool Maks & Moorits	80
TalTech/ALEXELA	70

Final; 21 February
Kalev/Cramo	75
Tartu Ülikool Maks & Moorits	86
Third place
TalTech/ALEXELA	86
Keila Coolbet	69

== Quarterfinals ==
=== Kalev/Cramo vs. Hepa Rapla ===
16 February 2026	Hepa Rapla	64–109	Kalev/Cramo	Rapla
19:00	Scoring by quarter: 10–34, 17–23, 27–25, 10–27
	Pts: Ratas 13; Rebs: Kaldre, Ratas 4 Asts: Kaldre, Šein 4 PIR: Ratas 13	Boxscore	Pts: Kaukiainen 22; Rebs: Miška 14; Asts: Kaukiainen 7 PIR: Kaukiainen 31	Arena: Sadolin Sports Hall; Attendance: 589; Referees: Egert Tiidor, Rauno Kobin, Andris Smorodin

=== Transcom Pärnu vs. Keila Coolbet ===
16 February 2026	Transcom Pärnu	75–79(OT)	Keila Coolbet	Pärnu
19:00	Scoring by quarter: 18–20, 15–23, 19–14, 20–15, Overtime: 3–7
	Pts: Harris 18; Rebs: Harris 11; Asts: Harris 5 PIR: Harris 27	Boxscore	Pts: Maletic 29; Rebs: Thompson 14; Asts: Küttis 5 PIR: Thompson 32	Arena: Pärnu Sports Hall; Attendance: 428; Referees: Mihkel Männiste, Hendrik Laas, Madis Allik

=== Tartu Ülikool Maks & Moorits vs. Keila KK ===
17 February 2026	Tartu Ülikool Maks & Moorits	83–61	Keila KK	Tartu
19:00	Scoring by quarter: 20–21, 28–12, 18–15, 17–13
	Pts: Andre 14; Rebs: Painter 9 Asts: Paasoja 6 PIR: Painter 18	Boxscore	Pts: Sats 21; Rebs: Muhammad 15; Asts: Paige 4 PIR: Muhammad 19	Arena: University of Tartu Sports Hall; Attendance: 679; Referees: Mart Uuehendrik, Risto Visnapuu, Marcus Sadõhov

=== TalTech/ALEXELA vs. Viimsi ===
17 February 2026	TalTech/ALEXELA	95–76	Viimsi	Tallinn
18:30	Scoring by quarter: 17–20, 27–14, 18–20, 33–22
	Pts: Suurorg 30; Rebs: Jurkatamm, Niits 9 Asts: Post 8 PIR: Suurorg 30	Boxscore	Pts: Rikberg 17; Rebs: Baker 6 Asts: Kuusmaa 5 PIR: Rikberg 18	Arena: TalTech Sports Hall; Attendance: 417; Referees: Rainis Värv, Aleksei Mohov, Reijo Nano

== Semifinals ==
=== Kalev/Cramo vs. Keila Coolbet ===
18 February 2026	Kalev/Cramo	107–78	Keila Coolbet	Tallinn
19:00	Scoring by quarter: 24–24, 27–21, 22–8, 34–25
	Pts: Kaukiainen 23; Rebs: Kuuba 10; Asts: Kaukiainen 6 PIR: Kaukiainen 30	Boxscore	Pts: Lenk 29; Rebs: Küttis, Thompson 6 Asts: Lenk 3 PIR: Lenk 33	Arena: Nord Sports Hall; Attendance: 327; Referees: Hendrik Laas, Madis Allik, Rauno Kobin

=== Tartu Ülikool Maks & Moorits vs. TalTech/ALEXELA ===
19 February 2026	Tartu Ülikool Maks & Moorits	80–70	TalTech/ALEXELA	Tartu
19:00	Scoring by quarter: 15–25, 28–8, 24–22, 13–15
	Pts: Bernard 21; Rebs: Bernard 9 Asts: Bernard 4 PIR: Bernard 30	Boxscore	Pts: Metsalu 14; Rebs: Metsalu, Post 7 Asts: Post 7 PIR: Metsalu, Niits 19	Arena: University of Tartu Sports Hall; Attendance: 1,308; Referees: Rainis Värv, Ranno Konks, Aleksei Mohov

== Third place game ==
21 February 2026	TalTech/ALEXELA	86–69	Keila Coolbet	Tallinn
16:00	Scoring by quarter: 26–26, 15–17, 29–9, 16–17
	Pts: Metsalu 24; Rebs: Jurkatamm 18; Asts: Pehka 7 PIR: Jurkatamm 27	Boxscore	Pts: Maletic 17; Rebs: Thompson 7 Asts: Küttis 8 PIR: Saal 17	Arena: TalTech Sports Hall; Attendance: 397

== Final ==
21 February 2026	Kalev/Cramo	75–86	Tartu Ülikool Maks & Moorits	Tallinn
19:00	Scoring by quarter: 17–29, 25–22, 21–13, 12–22
	Pts: Toom, Kaukiainen 13; Rebs: Miška 7 Asts: Makke 4 PIR: Toom, Miška 17	Boxscore	Pts: Lips 27; Rebs: Ilver 9 Asts: Lips, McBride 5 PIR: Lips 30	Arena: Unibet Arena; Attendance: 1,968; Referees: Mihkel Männiste, Rainis Värv, Hendrik Laas

== See also ==
- 2026 KML Playoffs
