= 2025 KML Playoffs =

Estonian basketball league season

Korvpalli Meistriliiga
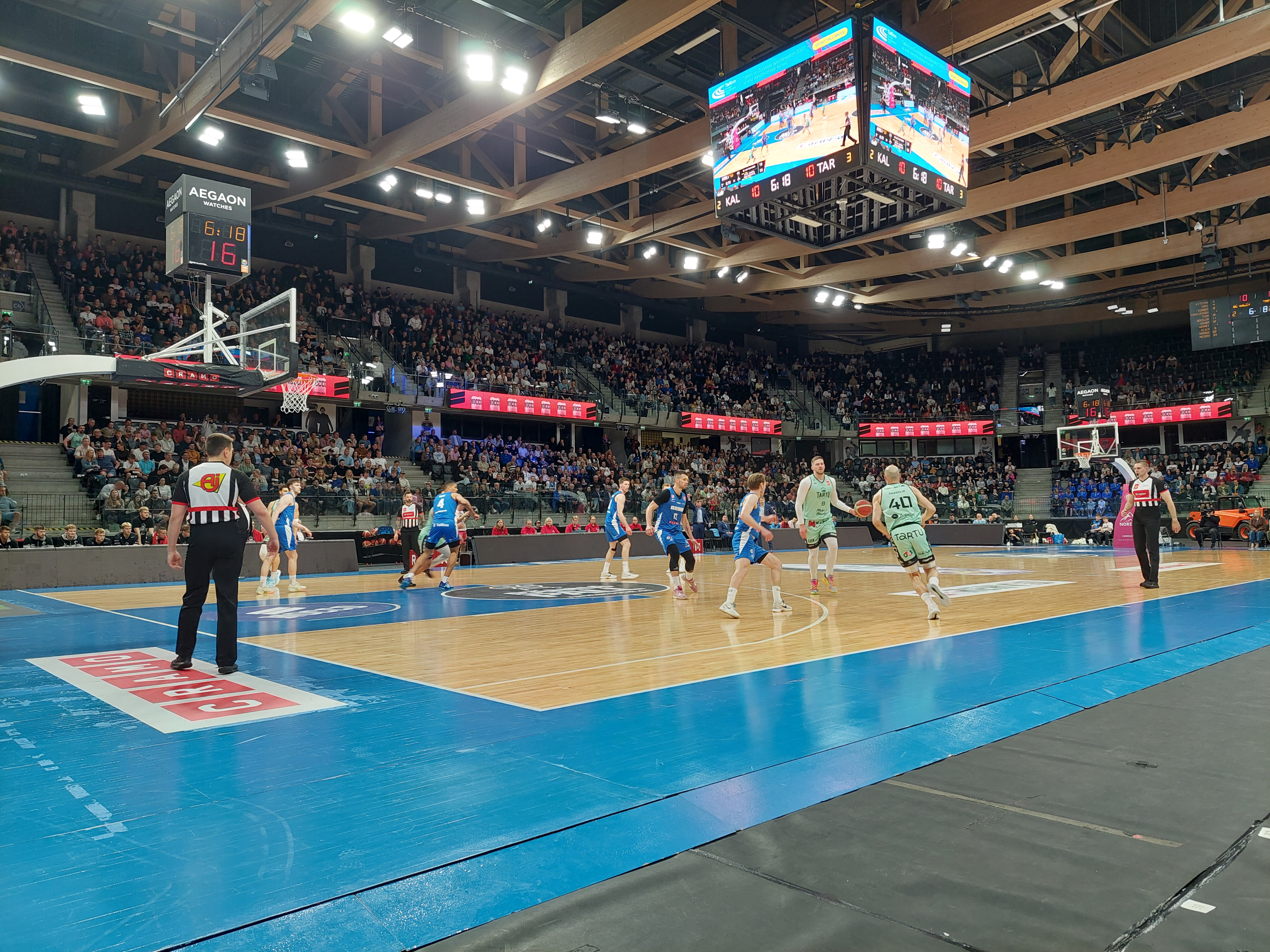
- Game 5 of the finals between Kalev and Tartu
- Season: 2024–25
- Duration: 14 April – 31 May
- Games played: 33
- Teams: 8
- TV partners: Delfi TV, Inspira

Finals
- Champions: BC Kalev/Cramo (15th title)
- Runners-up: Tartu Ülikool Maks & Moorits
- Third place: UTILITAS RAPLA
- Fourth place: TalTech/ALEXELA
- Finals MVP: (Finland) Severi Kaukiainen

Statistical leaders
Points	(United States) Javeon Jones	24.7
Rebounds	(United States) (Austria) Bryce Douvier	11.4
Assists	(Finland) Severi Kaukiainen	5.9
Index Rating	(United States) Javeon Jones	28.3

Records
- Biggest home win: UTILITAS RAPLA 100–69 Pärnu Sadam (23 April 2024)
- Biggest away win: Viimsi 74–104 Tartu Ülikool Maks & Moorits (25 April 2025)
- Highest scoring: BC Kalev/Cramo 112–82 Keila KK (24 April 2025)
- Highest attendance: 4,623; BC Kalev/Cramo 91–75 Tartu Ülikool Maks & Moorits (31 May 2025)
- Lowest attendance: 361; Viimsi 59–78 Tartu Ülikool Maks & Moorits (18 April 2025)

The 2025 KML Playoffs is the postseason tournament held to determine the 2024–25 champions of the Korvpalli Meistriliiga (KML). The playoffs began on 14 April 2025 and ended on 31 May with BC Kalev/Cramo defeating Tartu Ülikool Maks & Moorits in the finals.

== Teams ==
Location of teams in 2024–25 KML

Team	Home city	Arena	Capacity
BC Kalev/Cramo	Tallinn	Unibet Arena	7,200
BC Kalev/Cramo	Tallinn	Tondiraba Sports Center	5,840
BC Kalev/Cramo	Tallinn	Kalev Sports Hall	1,700
Keila Coolbet	Keila	Keila Health Center	800
Keila KK	Keila	Keila Health Center	800
Pärnu Sadam	Pärnu	Pärnu Sports Hall	1,820
TalTech/ALEXELA	Tallinn	TalTech Sports Hall	1,000
Tartu Ülikool Maks & Moorits	Tartu	University of Tartu Sports Hall	2,600
UTILITAS RAPLA	Rapla	Sadolin Sports Hall	958
Viimsi	Haabneeme	Forus Sports Center	500

== Regular season ==
The club rankings were determined by the results of the 2024–25 Estonian-Latvian Basketball League regular season.

Pos	Team	Pld	W	L	PF	PA	PD	PCT	Qualification
1	(Estonia) BC Kalev/Cramo	28	24	4	2478	2079	+399	.857	Qualification to playoffs
2	(Estonia) Tartu Ülikool Maks & Moorits	28	17	11	2301	2270	+31	.607	Qualification to playoffs
3	(Estonia) TalTech/ALEXELA	28	14	14	2259	2326	−67	.500	Qualification to playoffs
4	(Estonia) UTILITAS RAPLA	28	14	14	2312	2288	+24	.500	Qualification to playoffs
5	(Estonia) Pärnu Sadam	28	11	17	2273	2385	−112	.393	Qualification to playoffs
6	(Estonia) Keila Coolbet	28	8	20	2149	2378	−229	.286	Qualification to playoffs
7	(Estonia) Viimsi	28	5	23	2019	2407	−388	.179	Qualification to playoffs
8	(Estonia) Keila KK	28	4	24	2068	2533	−465	.143	Qualification to playoffs

== Bracket ==
Quarterfinals
1	BC Kalev/Cramo	3
8	Keila KK	0
4	UTILITAS RAPLA	3
5	Pärnu Sadam	2
2	Tartu Ülikool Maks & Moorits	3
7	Viimsi	1
3	TalTech/ALEXELA	3
6	Keila Coolbet	0

Semifinals
1	BC Kalev/Cramo	3
4	UTILITAS RAPLA	0
2	Tartu Ülikool Maks & Moorits	3
3	TalTech/ALEXELA	2

Finals
1	BC Kalev/Cramo	3
2	Tartu Ülikool Maks & Moorits	2
Third place
3	TalTech/ALEXELA	2
4	UTILITAS RAPLA	3

== Quarterfinals ==
All times are in Eastern European Summer Time (UTC+03:00)

The quarterfinals are best-of-five series.

=== BC Kalev/Cramo vs. Keila KK ===
17 April 2025	BC Kalev/Cramo	99–76 (Series: 1–0)	Keila KK	Tallinn
19:00	Scoring by quarter: 35–11, 24–22, 26–19, 14–24
	Pts: Vaaks 17; Rebs: Hermet, Kuuba 9 Asts: Dorbek 8 PIR: Vaaks 23	Boxscore	Pts: Kaldre 20; Rebs: Jones 9 Asts: three players 3 PIR: Kaldre 21	Arena: Kalev Sports Hall; Attendance: 413; Referees: Ivo Kitsing, Rain Peerandi, Reijo Krismar Nano

20 April 2025	Keila KK	81–92 (Series: 0–2)	BC Kalev/Cramo	Keila
18:00	Scoring by quarter: 18–23, 29–22, 18–26, 16–21
	Pts: Jones 30; Rebs: Jones 6 Asts: Jones 5 PIR: Jones 34	Boxscore	Pts: Hermet 25; Rebs: Hermet 9 Asts: Dorbek 11; PIR: Hermet 38	Arena: Keila Health Center; Attendance: 424; Referees: Ranno Konks, Egert Tiidor, Risto Visnapuu

24 April 2025	BC Kalev/Cramo	112–82 (Series: 3–0)	Keila KK	Tallinn
19:00	Scoring by quarter: 35–22, 27–25, 29–12, 21–23
	Pts: Hermet 17; Rebs: Tapé 10; Asts: Dorbek 7 PIR: Hermet 28	Boxscore	Pts: Jones 26; Rebs: Jones 8 Asts: Sats 5 PIR: Jones 31	Arena: Kalev Sports Hall; Attendance: 427; Referees: Hendrik Laas, Erik Tserr, Aleksei Mohov

=== Tartu Ülikool Maks & Moorits vs. Viimsi ===
15 April 2025	Tartu Ülikool Maks & Moorits	81–76 (Series: 1–0)	Viimsi	Tartu
19:00	Scoring by quarter: 29–9, 15–22, 16–20, 21–25
	Pts: Lips 19; Rebs: El-Sheikh 9 Asts: Flood 7 PIR: Lips 23	Boxscore	Pts: Rikberg 21; Rebs: Rikberg 5 Asts: Kuusmaa 5 PIR: Rikberg 28	Arena: University of Tartu Sports Hall; Attendance: 637; Referees: Rainis Värv, Mart Uuehendrik, Egert Tiidor

18 April 2025	Viimsi	59–78 (Series: 0–2)	Tartu Ülikool Maks & Moorits	Viimsi
19:00	Scoring by quarter: 13–21, 12–17, 17–25, 17–15
	Pts: Pajić 14; Rebs: Hint 13; Asts: Hint, Reinart 4 PIR: Rikberg 21	Boxscore	Pts: Lips 16; Rebs: El-Sheikh 8 Asts: Paasoja 4 PIR: Lips 19	Arena: Forus Sports Center; Attendance: 361; Referees: Mihkel Männiste, Rain Peerandi, Aleksei Mohov

22 April 2025	Tartu Ülikool Maks & Moorits	77–80(OT) (Series: 2–1)	Viimsi	Tartu
19:00	Scoring by quarter: 16–23, 15–16, 19–15, 16–12, Overtime: 11–14
	Pts: Paasoja 26; Asts: Paasoja 7 PIR: Paasoja 21	Boxscore	Pts: Rikberg 22; Rebs: Pajić 13; Asts: Kuusmaa 6 PIR: Rikberg 26	Arena: University of Tartu Sports Hall; Attendance: 667; Referees: Aare Halliko, Ivo Kitsing, Reijo Krismar Nano

25 April 2025	Viimsi	74–104 (Series: 1–3)	Tartu Ülikool Maks & Moorits	Viimsi
19:00
	Pts: Rikberg, Pajić 15; Rebs: Three players 5 Asts: Kuusmaa 8 PIR: Rikberg 24	Boxscore	Pts: Henry 19; Rebs: El-Sheikh 14; Asts: El-Sheikh 5 PIR: El-Sheikh 30	Arena: Forus Sports Center; Attendance: 613; Referees: Rainis Värv, Hendrik Laas, Erik Tserr

=== TalTech/ALEXELA vs. Keila Coolbet ===
14 April 2025	TalTech/ALEXELA	79–66 (Series: 1–0)	Keila Coolbet	Tallinn
18:30	Scoring by quarter: 18–15, 18–20, 20–16, 23–15
	Pts: Andre 21; Rebs: Jurkatamm 15; Asts: Pehka 8 PIR: Jurkatamm 33	Boxscore	Pts: Trapp 14; Rebs: Kovalov 15; Asts: Trapp 4 PIR: Kovalov 24	Arena: TalTech Sports Hall; Attendance: 696; Referees: Rain Peerandi, Erik Tserr, Aleksei Mohov

17 April 2025	Keila Coolbet	63–76 (Series: 0–2)	TalTech/ALEXELA	Keila
19:30	Scoring by quarter: 21–14, 15–17, 16–25, 11–20
	Pts: Trapp 16; Rebs: Trapp 6 Asts: Küttis 4 PIR: Kovalov, Trapp 15	Boxscore	Pts: Andre 15; Rebs: Metsalu 9 Asts: Metsalu 4 PIR: Jurkatamm, Metsalu 19	Arena: Keila Health Center; Attendance: 573; Referees: Hendrik Laas, Rainis Värv, Risto Visnapuu

21 April 2025	TalTech/ALEXELA	84–70 (Series: 3–0)	Keila Coolbet	Tallinn
18:30	Scoring by quarter: 13–15, 29–20, 25–12, 17–23
	Pts: Jürgens 26; Rebs: Jürgens 7 Asts: Jürgens 6 PIR: Jürgens 43	Boxscore	Pts: three players 16; Rebs: Kovalov 10; Asts: Trapp 4 PIR: Küttis, Kovalov 22	Arena: TalTech Sports Hall; Attendance: 681; Referees: Mihkel Männiste, Mart Uuehendrik, Ranno Konks

=== UTILITAS RAPLA vs. Pärnu Sadam ===
16 April 2025	UTILITAS RAPLA	87–66 (Series: 1–0)	Pärnu Sadam	Rapla
19:00	Scoring by quarter: 23–14, 22–19, 22–21, 20–12
	Pts: McCreary 18; Rebs: Niits 12; Asts: Laane 9 PIR: McCreary 21	Boxscore	Pts: Douvier 22; Rebs: Douvier, Shevchenko 9 Asts: Suurorg 5 PIR: Douvier 26	Arena: Sadolin Sports Hall; Attendance: 855; Referees: Mihkel Männiste, Hendrik Laas, Ranno Konks

19 April 2025	Pärnu Sadam	82–75 (Series: 1–1)	UTILITAS RAPLA	Pärnu
17:00	Scoring by quarter: 16–25, 24–20, 18–14, 24–16
	Pts: Douvier 21; Rebs: Douvier 13; Asts: Suurorg 6 PIR: Douvier 37	Boxscore	Pts: Niits 22; Rebs: McCreary 13; Asts: Laane 6 PIR: Niits 20	Arena: Pärnu Sports Hall; Attendance: 1,017; Referees: Aare Halliko, Ivo Kitsing, Erik Tserr

23 April 2025	UTILITAS RAPLA	100–69 (Series: 2–1)	Pärnu Sadam	Rapla
19:00	Scoring by quarter: 23–23, 21–16, 20–12, 36–18
	Pts: Eelmäe, Ruubel 17; Rebs: Niits 10; Asts: McKissic 13; PIR: McKissic 29	Boxscore	Pts: Valge 22; Rebs: Douvier 10; Asts: Suurorg, Douvier 4 PIR: Douvier 22	Arena: Sadolin Sports Hall; Attendance: 628; Referees: Rain Peerandi, Rainis Värv, Egert Tiidor

26 April 2025	Pärnu Sadam	92–82 (Series: 2–2)	UTILITAS RAPLA	Pärnu
17:00	Scoring by quarter: 13–19, 33–23, 24–21, 22–19
	Pts: Aav 20; Rebs: Douvier 15; Asts: Suurorg 8 PIR: Douvier 33	Boxscore	Pts: Eelmäe 20; Rebs: McCreary 7 Asts: McKissic 7 PIR: McCreary 25	Arena: Pärnu Sports Hall; Attendance: 1,112; Referees: Aare Halliko, Mihkel Männiste, Ranno Konks

29 April 2025	UTILITAS RAPLA	95–69 (Series: 3–2)	Pärnu Sadam	Rapla
19:00	Scoring by quarter: 23–17, 25–16, 26–19, 21–17
	Pts: McKissic 26; Rebs: Niits 9 Asts: McKissic 7 PIR: McKissic 34	Boxscore	Pts: Valge 17; Rebs: Douvier 10; Asts: Suurorg 5 PIR: Douvier 17	Arena: Sadolin Sports Hall; Attendance: 925; Referees: Rain Peerandi, Hendrik Laas, Rainis Värv

== Semifinals ==
All times are in Eastern European Summer Time (UTC+03:00)

The semifinals are best-of-five series.

=== BC Kalev/Cramo vs. UTILITAS RAPLA ===
3 May 2025	BC Kalev/Cramo	88–64 (Series: 1–0)	UTILITAS RAPLA	Tallinn
19:00	Scoring by quarter: 26–19, 19–14, 20–14, 23–17
	Pts: Kurbas, Vaaks 16; Rebs: Tapé 5 Asts: Böckler, Kaukiainen 5 PIR: Kurbas 23	Boxscore	Pts: Niits 20; Rebs: Eelmäe 8 Asts: three players 3 PIR: Niits 25	Arena: Nord Sports Hall; Attendance: 603; Referees: Aare Halliko, Ivo Kitsing, Erik Tserr

6 May 2025	UTILITAS RAPLA	92–101 (Series: 0–2)	BC Kalev/Cramo	Rapla
19:00	Scoring by quarter: 22–29, 22–27, 24–22, 24–23
	Pts: Niits 19; Rebs: Eelmäe 8 Asts: Niits, McKissic 5 PIR: Eelmäe 26	Boxscore	Pts: Hermet 22; Rebs: Kuuba 6 Asts: Kaukiainen 12; PIR: Hermet 25	Arena: Sadolin Sports Hall; Attendance: 670; Referees: Rain Peerandi, Hendrik Laas, Ranno Konks

9 May 2025	BC Kalev/Cramo	96–79 (Series: 3–0)	UTILITAS RAPLA	Tallinn
19:00	Scoring by quarter: 19–10, 32–18, 22–29
	Pts: Dorbek 22; Asts: Dorbek 6 PIR: Dorbek 28	Boxscore	Pts: Ruubel 14; Rebs: Niits 8 Asts: Niits 4 PIR: Niits 20	Arena: Kalev Sports Hall; Attendance: 696; Referees: Mihke Männiste, Rainis Värv, Egert Tiidor

=== Tartu Ülikool Maks & Moorits vs. TalTech/ALEXELA ===
2 May 2025	Tartu Ülikool Maks & Moorits	74–69 (Series: 1–0)	TalTech/ALEXELA	Tartu
19:00	Scoring by quarter: 22–19, 23–20, 14–16, 15–14
	Pts: Lips 20; Rebs: El-Sheikh 9 Asts: Lips 5 PIR: Lips 26	Boxscore	Pts: Andre 20; Rebs: Metsalu 9 Asts: Metsalu 3 PIR: Andre 25	Arena: University of Tartu Sports Hall; Attendance: 2,156; Referees: Rain Peerandi, Rainis Värv, Ranno Konks

5 May 2025	TalTech/ALEXELA	86–80 (Series: 1–1)	Tartu Ülikool Maks & Moorits	Tallinn
18:30	Scoring by quarter: 20–22, 17–16, 19–23, 30–19
	Pts: Metsalu, Andre 18; Rebs: Metsalu 9 Asts: Jürgens 6 PIR: Andre 35	Boxscore	Pts: El-Sheikh 19; Rebs: El-Sheikh 7 Asts: Flood 9 PIR: Lips 22	Arena: TalTech Sports Hall; Attendance: 1,671; Referees: Mihkel Männiste, Hendrik Laas, Egert Tiidor

8 May 2025	Tartu Ülikool Maks & Moorits	79–69 (Series: 2–1)	TalTech/ALEXELA	Tartu
19:00	Scoring by quarter: 18–16, 24–20, 15–9, 22–24
	Pts: Lips 21; Rebs: El-Sheikh 9 Asts: Henry, Flood 4 PIR: Lips 29	Boxscore	Pts: Kitsing 15; Rebs: Metsalu 6 Asts: Pehka, Metsalu 3 PIR: Kitsing, Jürgens 10	Arena: University of Tartu Sports Hall; Attendance: 2,204; Referees: Aare Halliko, Mart Uuehendrik, Ivo Kitsing

11 May 2025	TalTech/ALEXELA	87–82 (Series: 2–2)	Tartu Ülikool Maks & Moorits	Tallinn
17:00	Scoring by quarter: 17–16, 30–18, 19–31, 21–17
	Pts: Andre 23; Rebs: Jurkatamm 7 Asts: Metsalu 4 PIR: Andre 36	Boxscore	Pts: Lips 19; Rebs: El-Sheikh 10; Asts: Flood 4 PIR: El-Sheikh 21	Arena: TalTech Sports Hall; Attendance: 1,369; Referees: Rain Peerandi, Rainis Värv, Hendrik Laas

13 May 2025	Tartu Ülikool Maks & Moorits	88–59 (Series: 3–2)	TalTech/ALEXELA	Tartu
19:00	Scoring by quarter: 20–18, 21–15, 18–15, 29–11
	Pts: Lips 20; Rebs: El-Sheikh 14; Asts: Flood 6 PIR: El-Sheikh 32	Boxscore	Pts: Pehka 22; Rebs: Jurkatamm 7 Asts: Jürgens, Metsalu 2 PIR: Jurkatamm 22	Arena: University of Tartu Sports Hall; Attendance: 2,437; Referees: Aare Halliko, Rain Peerandi, Mihkel Männiste

== Third place games ==
=== TalTech/ALEXELA vs. UTILITAS RAPLA ===
15 May 2025	TalTech/ALEXELA	90–73 (Series: 1–0)	UTILITAS RAPLA	Tallinn
18:30	Scoring by quarter: 26–18, 23–18, 25–15, 16–22
	Pts: Pehka 28; Rebs: Jurkatamm 8 Asts: Pehka 8 PIR: Pehka 34	Boxscore	Pts: Krūmiņš 17; Rebs: Niits 9 Asts: Laane 4 PIR: Stankovic 25	Arena: TalTech Sports Hall; Attendance: 489; Referees: Aare Halliko, Mihkel Männiste, Hendrik Laas

19 May 2025	UTILITAS RAPLA	84–69 (Series: 1–1)	TalTech/ALEXELA	Rapla
19:00	Scoring by quarter: 24–15, 21–21, 13–19, 26–14
	Pts: McCreary 23; Rebs: Niits 9 Asts: Laane 8 PIR: McCreary 23	Boxscore	Pts: Andre 22; Rebs: Jurkatamm, Sunelik 6 Asts: Jürgens 6 PIR: Jürgens 21	Arena: Sadolin Sports Hall; Attendance: 587; Referees: Rain Peerandi, Mart Uuehendrik, Ranno Konks

21 May 2025	TalTech/ALEXELA	91–67 (Series: 2–1)	UTILITAS RAPLA	Tallinn
18:30	Scoring by quarter: 14–19, 27–17, 25–17, 25–14
	Pts: Andre 21; Rebs: three players 7 Asts: Jürgens, Pehka 5 PIR: Andre 27	Boxscore	Pts: McKissic 14; Rebs: Niits 6 Asts: McKissic 4 PIR: Niits 19	Arena: TalTech Sports Hall; Attendance: 497; Referees: Mihkel Männiste, Ivo Kitsing, Egert Tiidor

24 May 2025	UTILITAS RAPLA	83–76 (Series: 2–2)	TalTech/ALEXELA	Rapla
17:00	Scoring by quarter: 22–19, 23–22, 12–18, 26–17
	Pts: Niits 19; Rebs: Niits, McCreary 8 Asts: Laane 4 PIR: Niits, Laane 23	Boxscore	Pts: Kitsing 16; Rebs: Kitsing 7 Asts: Pehka 6 PIR: Kitsing 24	Arena: Sadolin Sports Hall; Attendance: 644; Referees: Hendrik Laas, Rainis Värv, Erik Tserr

26 May 2025	TalTech/ALEXELA	76–91 (Series: 2–3)	UTILITAS RAPLA	Tallinn
18:30	Scoring by quarter: 17–29, 21–15, 20–28, 18–19
	Pts: Jürgens 18; Rebs: Jurkatamm 8 Asts: Pehka 6 PIR: Kitsing 16	Boxscore	Pts: McCreary 19; Rebs: Niits 14; Asts: Laane 7 PIR: Niits 32	Arena: TalTech Sports Hall; Attendance: 872; Referees: Rain Peerandi, Mart Uuehendrik, Ranno Konks

== Finals ==
=== BC Kalev/Cramo vs. Tartu Ülikool Maks & Moorits ===
20 May 2025	BC Kalev/Cramo	80–86 (Series: 0–1)	Tartu Ülikool Maks & Moorits	Tallinn
19:00	Scoring by quarter: 20–25, 13–22, 28–28, 19–11
	Pts: Vaaks 24; Rebs: Hermet 9 Asts: Kaukiainen 8 PIR: Kaukiainen 27	Boxscore	Pts: Flood 21; Rebs: El-Sheikh 20; Asts: El-Sheikh 4 PIR: El-Sheikh 42	Arena: Kalev Sports Hall; Attendance: 1,401; Referees: Aare Halliko, Rain Peerandi, Hendrik Laas

22 May 2025	Tartu Ülikool Maks & Moorits	90–92 (Series: 1–1)	BC Kalev/Cramo	Tartu
19:00	Scoring by quarter: 26–27, 18–18, 13–26, 33–21
	Pts: Paasoja 28; Rebs: Lips, El-Sheikh 9 Asts: Flood 5 PIR: Paasoja 29	Boxscore	Pts: Kaukiainen 18; Rebs: Hermet 8 Asts: Dorbek, Kaukiainen 5 PIR: Kaukiainen 20	Arena: University of Tartu Sports Hall; Attendance: 2,466; Referees: Mihkel Männiste, Rainis Värv, Ivo Kitsing

27 May 2025	BC Kalev/Cramo	88–81 (Series: 2–1)	Tartu Ülikool Maks & Moorits	Tallinn
19:00	Scoring by quarter: 17–22, 29–18, 19–19, 23–22
	Pts: Böckler 19; Rebs: Kuuba 9 Asts: Kaukiainen 11; PIR: Kaukiainen 19	Boxscore	Pts: Lips, Henry 16; Rebs: El-Sheikh 10; Asts: Lips 4 PIR: Lips, El-Sheikh 17	Arena: Unibet Arena; Attendance: 3,216; Referees: Rain Peerandi, Hendrik Laas, Ranno Konks

29 May 2025	Tartu Ülikool Maks & Moorits	75–72 (Series: 2–2)	BC Kalev/Cramo	Tartu
19:00	Scoring by quarter: 21–21, 22–21, 15–11, 17–19
	Pts: Paasoja 22; Rebs: El-Sheikh 16; Asts: Lips 4 PIR: Lips 23	Boxscore	Pts: Kaukiainen 15; Rebs: Hermet 7 Asts: Dorbek 5 PIR: Kurbas, Dorbek 13	Arena: University of Tartu Sports Hall; Attendance: 2,572; Referees: Rainis Värv, Hendrik Laas, Erik Tserr

31 May 2025	BC Kalev/Cramo	91–75 (Series: 3–2)	Tartu Ülikool Maks & Moorits	Tallinn
19:00	Scoring by quarter: 31–22, 17–11, 16–23, 27–19
	Pts: Toom 19; Rebs: Tapé 7 Asts: Kaukiainen 8 PIR: Kaukiainen 21	Boxscore	Pts: Lips, Flood 16; Rebs: El-Sheikh 10; Asts: Lips 5 PIR: Lips 20	Arena: Tondiraba Sports Center; Attendance: 4,623; Referees: Rainis Värv, Hendrik Laas, Erik Tserr

== Awards ==
=== KML Finals MVP ===
Player	Club	Ref.
(Finland) Severi Kaukiainen	(Estonia) BC Kalev/Cramo	

=== All-KML Team ===
Position	Player	Team
SG	(Estonia) Stefan Vaaks	BC Kalev/Cramo
SF	(Estonia) Hugo Toom	BC Kalev/Cramo
SF	(Estonia) Rasmus Andre	TalTech/ALEXELA
SF	(Egypt) Omar El-Sheikh	Tartu Ülikool Maks & Moorits
PF	(Estonia) Karl Johan Lips	Tartu Ülikool Maks & Moorits

== Attendances ==
=== Average attendances ===
Pos	Team	Total	High	Low	Average
1	Tartu Ülikool Maks & Moorits	13,139	2,572	637	1,877
2	BC Kalev/Cramo	11,379	4,623	413	1,625
3	Pärnu Sadam	2,129	1,112	1,017	1,064
4	TalTech/ALEXELA	5,786	1,671	489	826
5	UTILITAS RAPLA	4,309	925	587	718
6	Keila Coolbet	573	573	573	573
7	Viimsi	974	613	361	487
8	Keila KK	424	424	424	424
	League total	39,202	4,623	316	949

== Statistics ==
=== Points ===
Rank	Name	Team	Games	Points	PPG
1	(United States) Javeon Jones	Keila KK	3	74	24.67
2	(Estonia) Jorgen Rikberg	Viimsi	4	71	17.75
3	(United States) (Austria) Bryce Douvier	Pärnu Sadam	5	87	17.40

=== Rebounds ===
Rank	Name	Team	Games	Rebounds	RPG
1	(United States) (Austria) Bryce Douvier	Pärnu Sadam	5	57	11.40
2	(Egypt) Omar El-Sheikh	Tartu Ülikool Maks & Moorits	14	157	11.21
3	(Ukraine) Artem Kovalov	Keila Coolbet	3	30	10.00

=== Assists ===
Rank	Name	Team	Games	Assists	APG
1	(Finland) Severi Kaukiainen	BC Kalev/Cramo	11	65	5.91
2	(Estonia) Oliver Suurorg	Pärnu Sadam	5	28	5.60
3	(Estonia) Kaspar Kuusmaa	Viimsi	4	22	5.50

=== PIR ===
Rank	Name	Team	Games	PIR	PPG
1	(United States) Javeon Jones	Keila KK	3	85	28.33
2	(United States) (Austria) Bryce Douvier	Pärnu Sadam	5	135	27.00
3	(Estonia) Jorgen Rikberg	Viimsi	4	99	24.75

== See also ==
- 2024–25 Latvian–Estonian Basketball League
