= 2026 KML Playoffs =

Estonian basketball league season

Optibet Korvpalli Meistriliiga
- Season: 2025–26
- Duration: 10 April – 29 May 2026
- Games played: 26
- Teams: 7
- TV partners: Delfi TV, Inspira

Finals
- Champions: Tartu Ülikool Maks & Moorits (27th title)
- Runners-up: Kalev/Cramo
- Third place: TalTech/ALEXELA
- Fourth place: Transcom Pärnu
- Finals MVP: (United States) Bryce McBride

Statistical leaders
Points	(Canada) Marko Maletic	26.0
Rebounds	(United States) Isaiah Thompson	10.7
Assists	(United States) Devin Harris	6.9

Records
- Biggest away win: Keila Coolbet 74–101 Kalev/Cramo (15 April 2026)
- Highest scoring: Kalev/Cramo 116–109 Tartu Ülikool Maks & Moorits (26 May 2026)
- Highest attendance: 3,766; Kalev/Cramo 116–109 Tartu Ülikool Maks & Moorits (26 May 2026)
- Lowest attendance: 247; Keila Coolbet 74–101 Kalev/Cramo (15 April 2026)

The 2026 KML Playoffs was the postseason tournament held to determine the 2025–26 champions of the Korvpalli Meistriliiga (KML). The playoffs began on 10 April 2026 and ended on 29 May with Tartu Ülikool Maks & Moorits defeating Kalev/Cramo in the finals after eleven years.

Kalev/Cramo were the defending champions.

== Teams ==
Location of teams in 2025–26 KML

Team	Home city	Arena	Capacity
Kalev/Cramo	Tallinn	Tondiraba Sports Center	5,840
Kalev/Cramo	Tallinn	Nord Sports Hall	1,066
Keila Coolbet	Keila	Keila Health Center	800
Keila KK	Keila	Keila Health Center	800
TalTech/ALEXELA	Tallinn	TalTech Sports Hall	1,000
Tartu Ülikool Maks & Moorits	Tartu	University of Tartu Sports Hall	2,600
Transcom Pärnu	Pärnu	Pärnu Sports Hall	1,820
Viimsi	Haabneeme	Forus Sports Center	500

=== Personnel and sponsorship ===
Team	Head coach	Captain	Kit manufacturer	Shirt sponsor
(Estonia) Kalev/Cramo	(Finland) Anton Mirolybov	(Estonia) Martin Dorbek	Nike	Paf
(Estonia) Keila Coolbet	(Estonia) Peep Pahv		Nike	CityAlko
(Estonia) Keila KK	(Estonia) Andres Sõber		Nike	
(Estonia) TalTech/ALEXELA	(Estonia) Alar Varrak	(Estonia) Oliver Metsalu	Nike	Alexela
(Estonia) Tartu Ülikool Maks & Moorits	(Estonia) Aivar Kuusmaa	(Estonia) Martin Paasoja	Teamspirit	Maks & Moorits
(Estonia) Transcom Pärnu	(Estonia) Kristjan Evart	(Estonia) Sverre Aav	Nike	Transcom
(Estonia) Viimsi	(Estonia) Valdo Lips		Nike	Hausers

== Regular season ==
The club rankings were determined by the results of the 2025–26 Estonian-Latvian Basketball League regular season.

Pos	Team	Pld	W	L	PF	PA	PD	PCT	Qualification
1	Tartu Ülikool Maks & Moorits	26	21	5	2226	2047	+179	.808	Qualification to semifinals
2	Kalev/Cramo	26	20	6	2505	2108	+397	.769	Qualification to quarterfinals
3	TalTech/ALEXELA	26	17	9	2199	2121	+78	.654	Qualification to quarterfinals
4	Transcom Pärnu	26	11	15	2055	2066	−11	.423	Qualification to quarterfinals
5	Viimsi	26	7	19	1942	2308	−366	.269	Qualification to quarterfinals
6	Keila KK	26	5	21	2140	2491	−351	.192	Qualification to quarterfinals
7	Keila Coolbet	26	3	23	2048	2464	−416	.115	Qualification to quarterfinals

Source: Korvpalli Meistriliiga

== Bracket ==
Quarterfinals
4	Transcom Pärnu	3
5	Viimsi	0
2	Kalev/Cramo	3
7	Keila Coolbet	0
3	TalTech/ALEXELA	3
6	Keila KK	0

Semifinals
1	Tartu Ülikool Maks & Moorits	3
4	Transcom Pärnu	2
2	Kalev/Cramo	3
3	TalTech/ALEXELA	1

Finals
1	Tartu Ülikool Maks & Moorits	3
2	Kalev/Cramo	2
Third place
3	TalTech/ALEXELA	3
4	Transcom Pärnu	0

== Quarterfinals ==
All times are in Eastern European Summer Time (UTC+03:00)

The quarterfinals are best-of-five series.

=== Kalev/Cramo vs. Keila Coolbet ===
12 April 2026	Kalev/Cramo	106–101 (Series: 1–0)	Keila Coolbet	Kuressaare
17:00	Scoring by quarter: 28–15, 28–31, 32–22, 18–33
	Pts: Miška 31; Rebs: three players 5 Asts: Jelks 9 PIR: Miška 39	Boxscore	Pts: Maletic 32; Rebs: Thompson 10; Asts: Hill 4 PIR: Thompson 43	Arena: Kuressaare Sports Center; Attendance: 709; Referees: Mihkel Männiste, Madis Allik, Reijo Krismar Nano

15 April 2026	Keila Coolbet	74–101 (Series: 0–2)	Kalev/Cramo	Keila
19:30	Scoring by quarter: 23–28, 10–24, 18–24, 23–25
	Pts: Maletic 24; Rebs: Thompson, Maletic 8 Asts: Küttis 4 PIR: Küttis 23	Boxscore	Pts: Makke 20; Rebs: Kurucs, Jelks 8 Asts: Rosenthal 9 PIR: Makke 22	Arena: Keila Health Center; Attendance: 247; Referees: Hendrik Laas, Ivo Kitsing, Ranno Konks

18 April 2026	Kalev/Cramo	105–76 (Series: 3–0)	Keila Coolbet	Tallinn
19:00	Scoring by quarter: 35–23, 18–11, 31–24, 21–18
	Pts: Miška, Acuff 21; Rebs: Kurucs 9 Asts: Kaukiainen 11; PIR: Miška 26	Boxscore	Pts: Thompson 24; Rebs: Thompson 14; Asts: Hill 4 PIR: Thompson 34	Arena: Nord Sports Hall; Attendance: 401; Referees: Rainis Värv, Egert Tiidor, Rauno Kobin

=== TalTech/ALEXELA vs. Keila KK ===
11 April 2026	TalTech/ALEXELA	83–58 (Series: 1–0)	Keila KK	Tallinn
17:00	Scoring by quarter: 18–14, 14–21, 24–12, 27–11
	Pts: Pehka 15; Rebs: three players 9 Asts: Suurorg 6 PIR: Pehka 21	Boxscore	Pts: Idowu 15; Rebs: Idowu 9 Asts: Idowu 2 PIR: Idowu 19	Arena: TalTech Sports Hall; Attendance: 643; Referees: Mart Uuehendrik, Ivo Kitsing, Rauno Kobin

14 April 2026	Keila KK	65–73 (Series: 0–2)	TalTech/ALEXELA	Keila
19:00	Scoring by quarter: 18–23, 15–15, 13–23, 19–12
	Pts: Schmalz 26; Rebs: Schmalz 9 Asts: Morris 5 PIR: Schmalz 33	Boxscore	Pts: Metsalu 18; Rebs: Jurkatamm 15; Asts: Välb 5 PIR: Metsalu 28	Arena: Keila Health Center; Attendance: 412; Referees: Rainis Värv, Hendrik Laas, Aleksei Mohov

17 April 2026	TalTech/ALEXELA	110–81 (Series: 3–0)	Keila KK	Tallinn
18:30	Scoring by quarter: 23–11, 34–26, 27–22, 26–22
	Pts: three players 19; Rebs: Niits, Metsalu 7 Asts: Metsalu 9 PIR: Metsalu 32	Boxscore	Pts: Morris 27; Rebs: Idowu 9 Asts: Sats 5 PIR: Morris 29	Arena: TalTech Sports Hall; Attendance: 468; Referees: Rain Peerandi, Madis Allik, Risto Visnapuu

=== Transcom Pärnu vs. Viimsi ===
10 April 2026	Transcom Pärnu	87–81 (Series: 1–0)	Viimsi	Pärnu
19:00	Scoring by quarter: 19–24, 27–23, 30–19, 11–15
	Pts: Hint 18; Rebs: Hint 9 Asts: Harris 11; PIR: Hint 30	Boxscore	Pts: Kuusmaa 22; Rebs: Baker 7 Asts: Rikberg 4 PIR: Baker 29	Arena: Pärnu Sports Hall; Attendance: 642; Referees: Mihkel Männiste, Aleksei Mohov, Egert Tiidor

13 April 2026	Viimsi	81–96 (Series: 0–2)	Transcom Pärnu	Viimsi
18:30	Scoring by quarter: 25–37, 20–15, 17–24, 19–20
	Pts: Rikberg 21; Rebs: Rikberg, Baker 6 Asts: Kuusmaa 4 PIR: Rikberg 22	Boxscore	Pts: Harris 21; Rebs: Hint 7 Asts: Harris 5 PIR: Harris 31	Arena: Forus Sports Center; Attendance: 521; Referees: Mart Uuehendrik, Ranno Konks, Risto Visnapuu

16 April 2026	Transcom Pärnu	94–69 (Series: 3–0)	Viimsi	Pärnu
19:00	Scoring by quarter: 21–13
	Pts: Hint 17; Rebs: Hint 14; Asts: Harris 8 PIR: Hint 25	Boxscore	Pts: Pere 15; Rebs: Reinart 5 Asts: Kuusmaa 6 PIR: Baker 11	Arena: Pärnu Sports Hall; Attendance: 618; Referees: Mihkel Männiste, Rainis Värv, Reijo Krismar Nano

== Semifinals ==
All times are in Eastern European Summer Time (UTC+03:00)

The semifinals are best-of-five series.

=== Tartu Ülikool Maks & Moorits vs. Transcom Pärnu ===
27 April 2026	Tartu Ülikool Maks & Moorits	76–84 (Series: 0–1)	Transcom Pärnu	Tartu
19:00	Scoring by quarter: 25–17, 19–23, 23–17, 9–27
	Pts: Painter 20; Rebs: Lips 14; Asts: Lips 7 PIR: Lips 30	Boxscore	Pts: Hint 22; Rebs: Hint 8 Asts: Harris 10; PIR: Mohamed 26	Arena: University of Tartu Sports Hall; Attendance: 1,202; Referees: Rain Peerandi, Rainis Värv, Hendrik Laas

30 April 2026	Transcom Pärnu	101–81 (Series: 2–0)	Tartu Ülikool Maks & Moorits	Pärnu
19:00	Scoring by quarter: 21–26, 29–22, 24–22, 28–11
	Pts: Harris 31; Rebs: Johansson 8 Asts: Harris 7 PIR: Harris 47	Boxscore	Pts: McBride 16; Rebs: Painter 7 Asts: Paasoja, McBride 3 PIR: Paasoja 17	Arena: Pärnu Sports Hall; Attendance: 1,218; Referees: Mihkel Männiste, Ivo Kitsing, Ranno Konks

4 May 2026	Tartu Ülikool Maks & Moorits	82–75 (Series: 1–2)	Transcom Pärnu	Tartu
19:00	Scoring by quarter: 30–20, 15–16, 20–15, 17–24
	Pts: Ilver 17; Rebs: Ilver 12; Asts: Painter 4 PIR: Painter 29	Boxscore	Pts: Harris 21; Rebs: Harris 6 Asts: Harris 8 PIR: Harris 33	Arena: University of Tartu Sports Hall; Attendance: 1,411; Referees: Rain Peerandi, Mart Uuehendrik, Hendrik Laas

7 May 2026	Transcom Pärnu	63–70 (Series: 2–2)	Tartu Ülikool Maks & Moorits	Pärnu
19:00	Scoring by quarter: 17–19, 24–17, 9–14, 13–20
	Pts: Harris 21; Rebs: Harris 8 Asts: Harris, Johansson 4 PIR: Harris 22	Boxscore	Pts: Ilver 20; Rebs: Ilver 11; Asts: Paasoja 5 PIR: Ilver 26	Arena: Pärnu Sports Hall; Attendance: 1,548; Referees: Mihkel Männiste, Rainis Värv, Rauno Kobin

9 May 2026	Tartu Ülikool Maks & Moorits	76–72 (Series: 3–2)	Transcom Pärnu	Tartu
19:00	Scoring by quarter: 23–15, 12–19, 20–24, 21–17
	Pts: Paasoja 19; Rebs: Painter 9 Asts: Paasoja 4 PIR: Painter 25	Boxscore	Pts: Harris 22; Rebs: Eelmäe 8 Asts: Harris 7 PIR: Harris, Mohamed 23	Arena: University of Tartu Sports Hall; Attendance: 2,511; Referees: Rain Peerandi, Mihkel Männiste, Ivo Kitsing

=== Kalev/Cramo vs. TalTech/ALEXELA ===
28 April 2026	Kalev/Cramo	79–72 (Series: 1–0)	TalTech/ALEXELA	Tallinn
19:00	Scoring by quarter: 19–14, 19–15, 18–20, 23–23
	Pts: Makke 26; Rebs: Jelks 13; Asts: Jelks 6 PIR: Makke 27	Boxscore	Pts: Niits 32; Rebs: Metsalu 7 Asts: Post 5 PIR: Niits 35	Arena: Nord Sports Hall; Attendance: 688; Referees: Mihkel Männiste, Hendrik Laas, Rauno Kobin

1 May 2026	TalTech/ALEXELA	72–80 (Series: 0–2)	Kalev/Cramo	Tallinn
17:00	Scoring by quarter: 23–21, 17–27, 20–12, 12–20
	Pts: Metsalu 14; Rebs: Post 10; Asts: Post 8 PIR: Metsalu 18	Boxscore	Pts: Kaukiainen 18; Rebs: Miška 11; Asts: Kaukiainen 6 PIR: Kaukiainen 27	Arena: TalTech Sports Hall; Attendance: 1,176; Referees: Rain Peerandi, Rainis Värv, Ranno Konks

5 May 2026	Kalev/Cramo	77–78 (Series: 2–1)	TalTech/ALEXELA	Tallinn
19:00	Scoring by quarter: 26–20, 17–20, 17–16, 17–22
	Pts: Toom 17; Rebs: Jelks 9 Asts: Jelks 6 PIR: Jelks 25	Boxscore	Pts: Metsalu 25; Rebs: Niits 10; Asts: three players 3 PIR: Metsalu 23	Arena: Nord Sports Hall; Attendance: 673; Referees: Mihkel Männiste, Ivo Kitsing, Rauno Kobin

8 May 2026	TalTech/ALEXELA	82–95 (Series: 1–3)	Kalev/Cramo	Tallinn
18:30	Scoring by quarter: 24–16, 21–29, 16–26, 21–24
	Pts: Niits 23; Rebs: Metsalu 7 Asts: three players 4 PIR: Metsalu 30	Boxscore	Pts: Miška 23; Rebs: Jelks 8 Asts: Rosenthal 6 PIR: Miška 30	Arena: TalTech Sports Hall; Attendance: 1,014; Referees: Rain Peerandi, Rainis Värv, Hendrik Laas

== Third place games ==
=== TalTech/ALEXELA vs. Transcom Pärnu ===
13 May 2026	TalTech/ALEXELA	88–85(OT) (Series: 1–0)	Transcom Pärnu	Tallinn
18:30	Scoring by quarter: 23–22, 9–22, 15–18, 31–16, Overtime: 10–7
	Pts: Post 24; Rebs: Jurkatamm 10; Asts: Post 8 PIR: Post 24	Boxscore	Pts: Harris 19; Rebs: Hint, Johnson 7 Asts: Eelmäe, Harris 4 PIR: Johnson	Arena: TalTech Sports Hall; Attendance: 623; Referees: Mihkel Männiste, Ranno Konks, Rauno Kobin

15 May 2026	Transcom Pärnu	72–79 (Series: 0–2)	TalTech/ALEXELA	Pärnu
	Scoring by quarter: 14–19, 21–17, 18–22, 19–21
	Pts: Harris 21; Rebs: Mohamed 7 Asts: Harris 7 PIR: Harris 26	Boxscore	Pts: Metsalu 24; Rebs: Metsalu 10; Asts: Post 6 PIR: Metsalu 30	Arena: Pärnu Sports Hall; Attendance: 814; Referees: Rain Peerandi, Rainis Värv, Ivo Kitsing

17 May 2026	TalTech/ALEXELA	97–77 (Series: 3–0)	Transcom Pärnu	Tallinn
17:00	Scoring by quarter: 24–27, 19–31, 24–10, 30–9
	Pts: Post 31; Rebs: Metsalu 13; Asts: three players 5 PIR: Metsalu 25	Boxscore	Pts: Harris 22; Rebs: Harris, Johnson 5 Asts: Harris 5 PIR: Harris 27	Arena: TalTech Sports Hall; Attendance: 647; Referees: Hendrik Laas, Ranno Konks, Rauno Kobin

== Finals ==
=== Tartu Ülikool Maks & Moorits vs. Kalev/Cramo ===
16 May 2026	Tartu Ülikool Maks & Moorits	83–78 (Series: 1–0)	Kalev/Cramo	Tartu
19:00	Scoring by quarter: 19–21, 22–15, 11–23, 31–19
	Pts: McBride 20; Rebs: Painter 10; Asts: Lips, Bernard 5 PIR: Painter 26	Boxscore	Pts: Jelks 18; Rebs: Jelks 11; Asts: Rosenthal 7 PIR: Jelks 29	Arena: University of Tartu Sports Hall; Attendance: 2,311; Referees: Rain Peerandi, Hendrik Laas, Ranno Konks

20 May 2026	Kalev/Cramo	81–82 (Series: 0–2)	Tartu Ülikool Maks & Moorits	Tallinn
	Scoring by quarter: 21–28, 18–15, 18–17, 24–22
	Pts: Toom 22; Rebs: Miška 12; Asts: Kaukiainen 4 PIR: Toom 25	Boxscore	Pts: Paasoja 21; Rebs: Lips 10; Asts: Bernard 7 PIR: Ilver 19	Arena: Tondiraba Sports Center; Attendance: 2,736; Referees: Mihkel Männiste, Rainis Värv, Ivo Kitsing

23 May 2026	Tartu Ülikool Maks & Moorits	77–83 (Series: 2–1)	Kalev/Cramo	Tartu
19:00	Scoring by quarter: 31–22, 13–17, 18–16, 15–28
	Pts: Bernard, McBride 19; Rebs: Lips 12; Asts: Paasoja 5 PIR: Bernard 23	Boxscore	Pts: Toom 23; Rebs: Jelks 11; Asts: Rosenthal 6 PIR: Jelks 29	Arena: University of Tartu Sports Hall; Attendance: 2,795; Referees: Rain Peerandi, Hendrik Laas, Rauno Kobin

26 May 2026	Kalev/Cramo	116–109(OT) (Series: 2–2)	Tartu Ülikool Maks & Moorits	Tallinn
19:00	Scoring by quarter: 28–29, 26–21, 24–25, 18–21, Overtime: 20–13
	Pts: Toom 27; Rebs: Jelks 10; Asts: three players 5 PIR: Toom 33	Boxscore	Pts: Painter 22; Rebs: Painter 14; Asts: Bernard 9 PIR: Painter 39	Arena: Tondiraba Sports Center; Attendance: 3,766; Referees: Mihkel Männiste, Rainis Värv, Ranno Konks

29 May 2026	Tartu Ülikool Maks & Moorits	85–65 (Series: 3–2)	Kalev/Cramo	Tartu
19:00	Scoring by quarter: 20–18, 23–18, 17–15, 25–19
	Pts: Ilver 23; Rebs: Painter 14; Asts: Bernard 5 PIR: Painter 41	Boxscore	Pts: Kaukiainen 16; Rebs: Jelks 13; Asts: Rosenthal 6 PIR: Jelks, Kaukiainen 14	Arena: University of Tartu Sports Hall; Attendance: 2,734; Referees: Rain Peerandi, Mihkel Männiste, Ivo Kitsing

== Awards ==
=== KML Finals MVP ===
Player	Club	Ref.
(United States) Bryce McBride	(Estonia) Tartu Ülikool Maks & Moorits	

=== KML All-Star Five ===
Position	Player	Team
PG	(United States) Devin Harris	Transcom Pärnu
SF	(Estonia) Hugo Toom	Kalev/Cramo
PF	(Estonia) Oliver Metsalu	TalTech/ALEXELA
PF	(Estonia) Markus Ilver	Tartu Ülikool Maks & Moorits
C	(United States) Dylan Painter	Tartu Ülikool Maks & Moorits

== Attendances ==
=== Average attendances ===
Pos	Team	Total	High	Low	Average
1	Tartu Ülikool Maks & Moorits	12,964	2,795	1,202	2,160
2	Kalev/Cramo	8,973	3,766	401	1,495
2	Transcom Pärnu	4,870	1,548	618	974
3	TalTech/ALEXELA	4,571	1,176	468	761
5	Viimsi	521	521	521	521
6	Keila KK	412	412	412	412
7	Keila Coolbet	247	247	247	247
	League total	32,456	3,766	247	922

== See also ==
- 2025–26 Estonian Basketball Cup
- 2025–26 Latvian–Estonian Basketball League
