= Stefan Vaaks =

Estonian professional basketball player (born 2005)

No. 7 – Illinois Fighting Illini
- Position: Shooting guard
- Conference: Big Ten Conference

Personal information
- Born: 8 May 2005 (age 21) Tabasalu, Estonia
- Listed height: 6 ft 7 in (2.01 m)
- Listed weight: 215 lb (98 kg)

Career information
- College: Providence (2025–2026); Illinois (2026–present)
- Playing career: 2023–present

Career history
- 2023–2024: Viimsi
- 2024–2025: BC Kalev

Career highlights
- Estonian League champion (2025); KML All-Star Five (2025); Latvian–Estonian League All-Star Five (2025); Estonian Cup winner (2025); Big East All-Freshman Team (2026)

Stefan Vaaks (born 8 May 2005) is an Estonian college basketball player for the Illinois Fighting Illini of the Big Ten Conference. He previously played for the Providence Friars. Vaaks has also represented the Estonian national basketball team internationally.

== College career ==
On 4 April 2025, it was announced that Vaaks will play for the Providence Friars basketball team in the 2025–26 season. In the Big East Tournament, Vaaks scored 28 points against Butler. Vaaks was also chosen to the Big East All-Freshman Team. He averaged 15.8 points and 3.2 assists per game, while shooting 35% from 3-point range. Vaaks transferred to Illinois for his sophomore season.

== Professional career ==
Spending four years in CB Estudiantes academy, Vaaks came back to Estonia and signed with Viimsi of the Latvian–Estonian Basketball League for the 2023–24 season.

Vaaks left Viimsi to Kalev/Cramo after the season start. That season he won the Estonian Cup, became the Estonian champion with Kalev and was chosen to the Latvian-Estonian League All-Star Five.

== National team career ==
Vaaks has represented the Estonian U18 Team at the 2023 FIBA U18 European Championship Division B tournament.

In 2025, he made a debut for the Estonian national team in EuroBasket 2025 qualification tournament against North Macedonia, scoring 4 points in a 84–65 win.

== Career statistics ==
Legend
GP	Games played	GS	Games started	MPG	Minutes per game
FG%	Field goal percentage	3P%	3-point field goal percentage	FT%	Free throw percentage
RPG	Rebounds per game	APG	Assists per game	SPG	Steals per game
BPG	Blocks per game	PPG	Points per game	**Bold**	Career high

=== Domestic leagues ===
Season	Team	League	GP	MPG	FG%	3P%	FT%	RPG	APG	SPG	BPG	PPG
2023–24	(Estonia) Viimsi	LEBL	26	27.3	.436	.355	.699	2.5	1.8	1.3	.3	15.6
2024–25	(Estonia) Viimsi	LEBL	1	26.4	.46.5	.500	1.000	6.0	1.0	.0	.0	13.0
2024–25	(Estonia) BC Kalev	LEBL	29	24.3	.483	.331	.750	3.3	2.5	1.4	.4	15.2

=== College ===
Year	Team	GP	GS	MPG	FG%	3P%	FT%	RPG	APG	SPG	BPG	PPG
2025–26	Providence	**31**	**22**	**31.5**	**.403**	**.350**	**.839**	**2.5**	**3.2**	**.8**	**.3**	**15.8**
Career		31	22	31.5	.403	.350	.839	2.5	3.2	.8	.3	15.8
