= Karl Johan Lips =

Estonian basketball player (born 1996)

No. 9 – Stal Ostrów Wielkopolski
- Position: Power forward
- League: PLK

Personal information
- Born: 20 July 1996 (age 30) Tallinn, Estonia
- Listed height: 2.00 m (6 ft 7 in)
- Listed weight: 106 kg (234 lb)

Career information
- Playing career: 2011–present

Career history
- 2011–2012: Viimsi
- 2012–2014: Audentes
- 2013–2014: → Audentes II
- 2014–2017: Rapla
- 2014–2016: → Rapla II
- 2016–2017: → Kohila
- 2017: Rakvere Tarvas
- 2017–2018: Pärnu
- 2018–2021: Tallinna Kalev
- 2021: Viimsi
- 2021–2022: Chieti
- 2022–2023: Viimsi
- 2023–2024: Balkan Botevgrad
- 2024: Chieti
- 2024–2026: Tartu Ülikool
- 2026–present: Stal Ostrów Wielkopolski

Career highlights
- Estonian League champion (2026); Estonian Cup winner (2026); Latvian–Estonian League Season MVP (2026); Latvian–Estonian League All-Star Five (2026); Estonian Cup MVP (2026); 2× KML All-Star Five (2023, 2025)

Karl Johan Lips (born 20 July 1996) is an Estonian professional basketball player for Stal Ostrów Wielkopolski of the Polish Basketball League (PLK). Standing at 2.00 m (6 ft 7 in), he plays at the power forward position. He also represents the Estonian national team.

== Youth career ==
Lips began playing basketball with the youth teams of Viimsi.

== Professional career ==
Lips started his professional career with Rapla of the Korvpalli Meistriliiga during the 2014–15 season. On 2 February 2017, he left Rapla, and signed with Rakvere Tarvas, until the end of the season.

On 4 August 2017, Lips signed with Pärnu.

He joined Tallinna Kalev ahead of the 2018–19 season.

On 30 July 2021, Lips returned to his boyhood club Viimsi. However, on 17 November, it was announced that he would join Chieti of the Serie A2 on a two-month contract, replacing the injured Cameron Jackson. He returned to Viimsi on 31 January 2022.

On 21 July 2023, Lips signed with the reigning Bulgarian League champions Balkan Botevgrad. On 3 January 2024, his contract was terminated. On 11 January, he signed with his former club Chieti until the end of the season.

On 7 July 2024, Lips signed with Tartu Ülikool. He was named the Estonian-Latvian League regular season Most Valuable Player (MVP) in 2026.

On June 13, 2026, he signed with Stal Ostrów Wielkopolski of the Polish Basketball League (PLK).

== National team career ==
=== Senior national team ===
Lips made his debut for the Estonian national team at the 2027 FIBA World Cup qualifiers.

=== 3x3 basketball ===
Lips represented Estonia at the 2019 FIBA 3x3 World Cup and the 2021 FIBA 3x3 Europe Cup.
