= Gian Clavell =

Puerto Rican basketball player

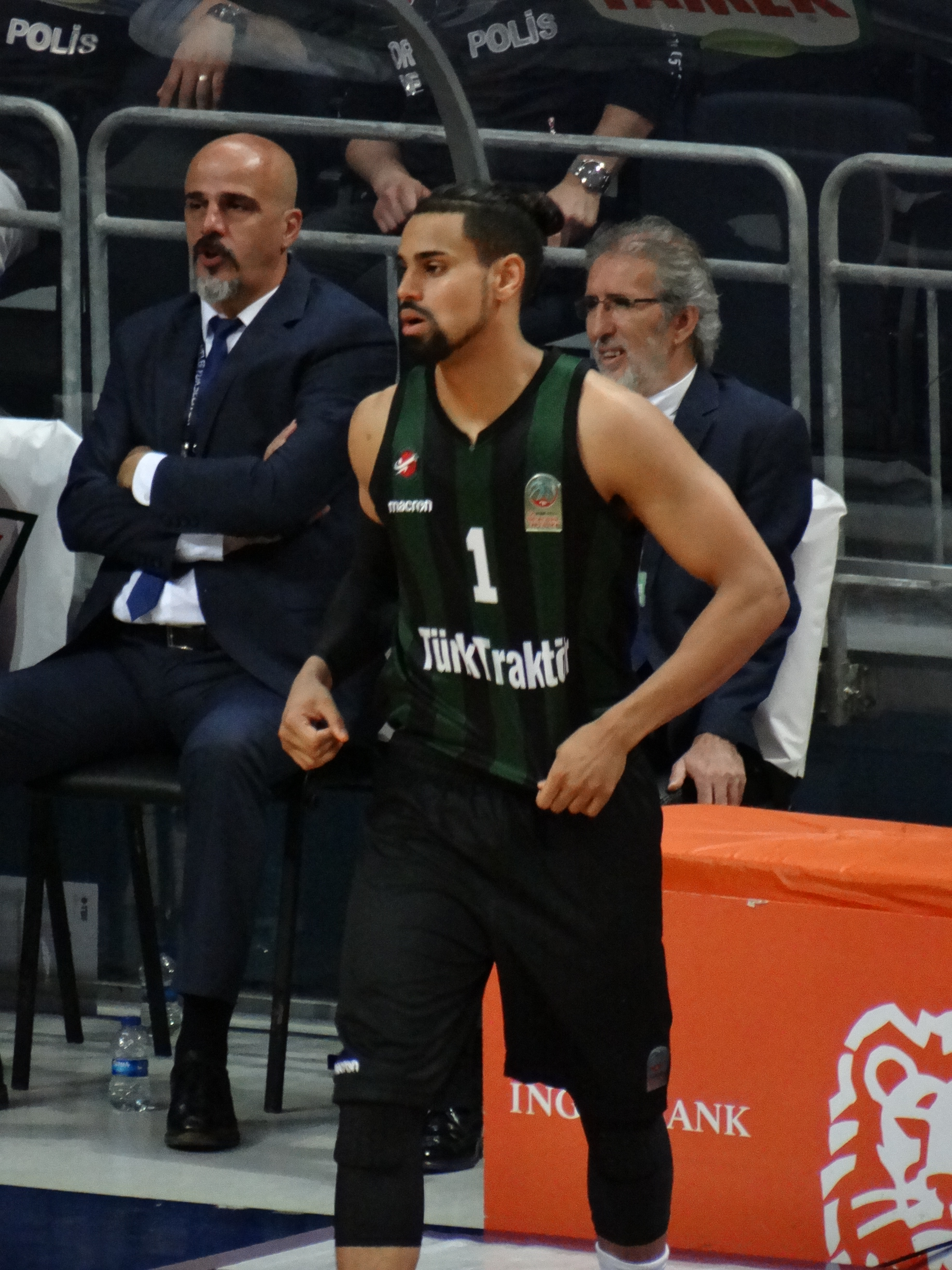
- Clavell with Büyükşehir Belediyesi in 2018

No. 3 – Bashkimi
- Position: Shooting guard / point guard
- League: Kosovo Basketball Superleague

Personal information
- Born: November 26, 1993 (age 32) Mayagüez, Puerto Rico
- Listed height: 6 ft 4 in (1.93 m)
- Listed weight: 185 lb (84 kg)

Career information
- High school: Hialeah Gardens (Hialeah Gardens, Florida)
- College: Northwest Kansas (2012–2014); Colorado State (2014–2017)
- NBA draft: 2017: undrafted
- Playing career: 2017–present

Career history
- 2017: Brujos de Guayama
- 2017: Dallas Mavericks
- 2017: →Texas Legends
- 2018: Büyükşehir Belediyesi
- 2018–2019: Estudiantes
- 2019–2020: Bursaspor
- 2020–2021: Avtodor Saratov
- 2021: Promitheas Patras
- 2021–2022: Budivelnyk
- 2022–2023: Cangrejeros de Santurce
- 2022–2024: Prometey
- 2024–2025: Piratas de Quebradillas
- 2024–2025: Granada
- 2025: CS Vâlcea 1924
- 2025: AEK Athens
- 2026: Piratas de Quebradillas
- 2026–present: Bashkimi

Career highlights
- 2× Latvian-Estonian Basketball League champion (2023, 2024); 2× Latvian–Estonian Basketball League Final MVP (2023, 2024); AP Honorable mention All-American (2017); Mountain West Player of the Year (2017); First-team All-Mountain West (2017); Mountain West All-Defensive Team (2017)
- Stats at NBA.com
- Stats at Basketball Reference
Medals
Men's basketball
Representing Puerto Rico
Central American and Caribbean Games
Gold medal – first place	2018 Barranquilla	Team

Gian Louis Clavell López (born November 26, 1993) is a Puerto Rican professional basketball player for Bashkimi of the Kosovo Basketball Superleague. He played three seasons of college basketball for the Colorado State Rams, earning Mountain West Conference Player of the Year honors in 2017. He also represents the Puerto Rican national team.

== College career ==
Clavell played college basketball for Northwest Kansas between 2012 and 2014 and then Colorado State between 2014 and 2017. He was named Mountain West Conference Player of the Year in 2017, becoming the first CSU Ram to win the award.

== Professional career ==
After graduating from college, Clavell had a three-game stint with Brujos de Guayama in Puerto Rico prior to the 2017 NBA draft. After going undrafted, he joined the Miami Heat for the 2017 NBA Summer League. On July 23, 2017, he signed a partially-guaranteed deal with the Dallas Mavericks to join the preseason roster. His contract would later be converted to a two-way deal, meaning throughout his time with the Mavericks, he would split playing time between Dallas and their NBA G League affiliate, the Texas Legends. He played seven NBA games before being waived by the Mavericks on November 17, 2017.

In January 2018, Clavell joined Sakarya BB of the Turkish Super League (BSL).

In July 2018, Clavell joined the Golden State Warriors for the 2018 NBA Summer League. On August 3, 2018, he signed a one-year deal with Movistar Estudiantes of the Liga ACB.

In July 2019, Clavell joined the Portland Trail Blazers for 2019 NBA Summer League. On December 11, 2019, he signed with Frutti Extra Bursaspor of the Turkish BSL. In 12 games to finish the 2019–20 season, he averaged 18.7 points, 3.5 rebounds, 1.7 assists and 1.6 steals per game.

On October 24, 2020, Clavell signed with Avtodor Saratov of the VTB United League. In April 2021, he joined Promitheas Patras of the Greek Basket League. He appeared in 11 games to finish the season.

On August 11, 2021, Clavell signed with Budivelnyk Kyiv of the Ukrainian Basketball SuperLeague.

In 2022, Clavell played for Cangrejeros de Santurce of the Baloncesto Superior Nacional. In 35 games, he averaged 15.0 points, 2.9 rebounds and 2.5 assists per game.

On June 24, 2022, Clavell signed with Prometey of the Latvian-Estonian Basketball League. After another stint with Cangrejeros de Santurce in 2023, he returned to Prometey for the 2023–24 season.

In 2024, Clavell played for Piratas de Quebradillas of the BSN.

== National team career ==
Clavell represents Puerto Rico at the international level. He was part of the team that helped Puerto Rico qualify for the 2024 Summer Olympics after defeating both Italy in the semifinals and Lithuania in the final of one of four 2024 FIBA Men's Olympic Qualifying Tournaments.

== Personal life ==
Clavell's brother, Gilberto, is also a professional basketball player and played college basketball at Sam Houston State.

On March 1, 2025, Clavell's wife announced on Instagram that he had a brush with death due to complications from appendicitis. He had been admitted to the ICU on February 26 but had a febrile seizure due to the severe infection.

== Career statistics ==
Legend
GP	Games played	GS	Games started	MPG	Minutes per game
FG%	Field goal percentage	3P%	3-point field goal percentage	FT%	Free throw percentage
RPG	Rebounds per game	APG	Assists per game	SPG	Steals per game
BPG	Blocks per game	PPG	Points per game	**Bold**	Career high

=== NBA ===
==== Regular season ====
Year	Team	GP	GS	MPG	FG%	3P%	FT%	RPG	APG	SPG	BPG	PPG
2017–18	Dallas	7	0	9.1	.333	.400	1.000	1.0	.4	.3	.0	2.9

=== BSN ===
Year	Team	GP	GS	MPG	FG%	3P%	FT%	RPG	APG	SPG	BPG	PPG
2022	Cangrejeros	26	26	30.1	.396	.320	.700	2.9	2.5	.846	.269	14.8
