= Latvian–Estonian Basketball League Awards =

The Latvian–Estonian Basketball League Awards are the awards given to the top individual performers of each season's edition of Latvian-Estonian Basketball League, which is the top-tier men's basketball league in Latvia and Estonia.

== Regular Season MVP ==
Season	MVP	Club	Ref.
2024–25	(Ukraine) Issuf Sanon	(Latvia) VEF Rīga	
2025–26	(Estonia) Karl Johan Lips	(Estonia) Tartu Ülikool Maks & Moorits	

== Finals MVP ==
Season	Final Four MVP	Club	Ref.
2018–19	(Latvia) Rihards Lomažs	(Latvia) BK Ventspils	
2019–20	Not awarded due to the COVID-19 pandemic.		
2020–21	(United States) Maurice Kemp	(Estonia) BC Kalev/Cramo	
2021–22	(United States) Jalen Riley	(Latvia) VEF Riga	
2022–23	(Puerto Rico) Gian Clavell	(Ukraine) BC Prometey	
2023–24	(Puerto Rico) Gian Clavell	(Ukraine) BC Prometey	
2024–25	(Ukraine) Vyacheslav Bobrov	(Latvia) VEF Riga	
2025–26	(New Zealand) Aniwaniwa Tait-Jones	(Latvia) Valmiera Glass VIA	

== All-Star Five ==
Season	Ref.	Pos.	Player	Team
2020–21		PG	(United States) Kyle Allman Jr.	(Latvia) VEF Riga
2020–21		PG	(United States) Brandon Childress	(Estonia) AVIS UTILITAS Rapla
2020–21		SF	(Estonia) Janari Jõesaar	(Estonia) BC Kalev/Cramo
2020–21		SF	(Latvia) Rihards Kuksiks	(Latvia) BK Ogre
2020–21		PF	(United States) Maurice Kemp	(Estonia) BC Kalev/Cramo
2021–22		PG	(United States) Jalen Riley	(Latvia) VEF Riga
2021–22		PG	(Ukraine) Vitaliy Zotov	(Latvia) VEF Riga
2021–22		SG	(Estonia) Robert Valge	(Estonia) Pärnu Sadam
2021–22		C	(Finland) Alexander Madsen	(Latvia) VEF Riga
2021–22		C	(United States) Tyler Roberson	(Estonia) KK Viimsi/Sportland
2022–23		PG	(Puerto Rico) Gian Clavell	(Ukraine) BC Prometey
2022–23		PG	(United States) Ty Gordon	(Estonia) Tartu Ülikool Maks & Moorits
2022–23		PG	(Ukraine) Oleksandr Kovliar	(Estonia) BC Kalev/Cramo
2022–23		PG	(Latvia) Kristers Zoriks	(Latvia) VEF Riga
2022–23		C	(Czech Republic) Ondřej Balvín	(Ukraine) BC Prometey
2023–24		G/F	(United States) Ronald March	(Ukraine) BC Prometey
2023–24		PG	(United States) Ben Shungu	(Estonia) BC Kalev/Cramo
2023–24		PF	(Estonia) Kregor Hermet	(Estonia) BC Kalev/Cramo
2023–24		C	(Puerto Rico) Arnaldo Toro	(Latvia) VEF Riga
2023–24		C	(Czech Republic) Ondřej Balvín	(Ukraine) BC Prometey
2024–25		PG	(Ukraine) Issuf Sanon	(Latvia) VEF Rīga
2024–25		SG	(Estonia) Stefan Vaaks	(Estonia) BC Kalev/Cramo
2024–25		SF	(Ukraine) Vyacheslav Bobrov	(Latvia) VEF Rīga
2024–25		PF	(Latvia) Kristaps Dārgais	(Latvia) BK Ogre
2024–25		C	(Latvia) Krišs Helmanis	(Latvia) Rīgas Zeļļi
2025–26		PG	(Lithuania) Dominykas Stenionis	(Latvia) Valmiera Glass VIA
2025–26		SF	(Estonia) Hugo Toom	(Estonia) Kalev/Cramo
2025–26		PF	(Estonia) Karl Johan Lips	(Estonia) Tartu Ülikool Maks & Moorits
2025–26		PF	(Estonia) Markus Ilver	(Estonia) Tartu Ülikool Maks & Moorits
2025–26		C	(United States) Brandon Huffman	(Latvia) VEF Rīga
