= Sven Kaldre =

Estonian basketball player

Rapla KK
- Title: Team manager
- League: I liiga

Personal information
- Born: October 31, 1991 (age 35) Kärasi, Estonia
- Listed height: 6 ft 6 in (1.98 m)
- Listed weight: 192 lb (87 kg)

Career information
- Playing career: 2008–2025
- Position: Shooting guard

Career history

Playing
- 2008: Valga
- 2009: Kuremaa
- 2009: Tartu Ülikool
- 2010: Rakvere Tarvas
- 2011–2014: Rapla
- 2014–2015: Força Lleida
- 2015–2023: Rapla
- 2024–2025: Keila KK

Coaching
- 2025–present: Rapla
Medals
Representing Estonia
Men's basketball
FIBA U20 European Championship
Silver medal – second place	2011 Bosnia and Herzegovina	U20 Team

Sven Kaldre (born 31 October 1991) is an Estonian former professional basketball player, and current team manager for Rapla. He played as a shooting guard during his playing career.

== International career ==
Kaldre is a member of the Estonia men's national basketball team since 2014.
