= Keila Basket =

Estonian basketball club

- Leagues: Korvpalli Meistriliiga; Estonian-Latvian Basketball League
- Founded: 2022; 4 years ago
- History: Keila Basket (2022–present)
- Arena: Keila Health Center
- Capacity: 800
- Location: Keila, Estonia
- Team colors: Black, White
- Head coach: Peep Pahv
- Website: keilabasket.ee
Home	Away

Keila Basket is a basketball team based in Keila, Estonia. The team plays in the Estonian-Latvian Basketball League, Korvpalli Meistriliiga (KML) and European North Basketball League (ENBL). Their home arena is the Keila Health Center.

== History ==
After Keila Basket parted their ways with Keila KK, they started to use Tallinna Kalev's license to play in the Estonian–Latvian Basketball League and in the Korvpalli Meistriliiga under the name of Keila Coolbet.

== Sponsorship naming ==
- Keila Coolbet: 2023–2026

== Home arena ==
- Keila Health Center (2022–present)

== Players ==
=== Current roster ===
Note: Flags indicate national team eligibility at FIBA-sanctioned events. Players may hold other non-FIBA nationalities not displayed.

Keila Basket roster
Players
Coaches

Pos.	No.	Nat.	Name	Ht.	Wt.	Age
PG	1	(United States)	Tillmon, Jordan	1.90 m (6 ft 3 in)	84 kg (185 lb)	24 – 27 January 2002
SG	2	(Estonia)	Sepik, Kermo	1.92 m (6 ft 4 in)	84 kg (185 lb)	20 – 24 May 2006
PG	3	(Estonia)	Lindeberg, Meiko	1.91 m (6 ft 3 in)	85 kg (187 lb)	21 – 31 August 2005
PG	4	(Estonia)	Laane, Rait-Riivo	1.79 m (5 ft 10 in)	79 kg (174 lb)	33 – 24 May 1993
PG	8	(Estonia)	Pahv, Margus (C)	1.91 m (6 ft 3 in)	92 kg (203 lb)	25 – 30 October 2000
PF	9	(Estonia)	Midri, Marten	2.00 m (6 ft 7 in)	98 kg (216 lb)	18 – 9 January 2008
PF	10	(United States)	Harge, John	2.02 m (6 ft 8 in)	108 kg (238 lb)	26 – 12 June 2000
SF	13	(United States)	Chargois, Seth	1.98 m (6 ft 6 in)	86 kg (190 lb)	24 – 15 May 2002
PG	16	(Estonia)	Tamkivi, Roland	1.93 m (6 ft 4 in)	91 kg (201 lb)	26 – 1 September 2000
PG	19	(Estonia)	Kivimägi, Andries	1.79 m (5 ft 10 in)	76 kg (168 lb)	18 – 14 November 2007
SG	21	(Estonia)	Lenk, Christopher	1.91 m (6 ft 3 in)	85 kg (187 lb)	21 – 12 December 2004
PF	22	(Latvia)	Salmiņš, Pēteris	2.05 m (6 ft 9 in)	95 kg (209 lb)	25 – 27 April 2001
SF	25	(Estonia)	Avarsalu, Markus Robin	1.94 m (6 ft 4 in)	94 kg (207 lb)	19 – 18 January 2007
SG	30	(Estonia)	Koitmaa, Karl	1.96 m (6 ft 5 in)	85 kg (187 lb)	17 – 26 November 2008

Head coach

- (Estonia) Peep Pahv

Assistant coach(es)

- (Estonia) Rait-Riivo Laane

Legend

- (C) Team captain
- Injured

- Roster
Updated: 24 October 2026

=== Depth chart ===
Pos.	Starting 5	Bench 1	Bench 2
C	Pēteris Salmiņš
PF		Marten Midri	Margus Pahv
SF	Christopher Lenk	Roland Tamkivi	Markus Robin Avarsalu
SG	Jordan Tillmon	Kermo Sepik	Karl Koitmaa
PG	Rait Riivo Laane	Meiko Lindeberg	Andries Kivimägi

== Head coaches ==
- Peep Pahv 2022–present

== Season by season ==
Season	Tier	Division	Pos.	Estonian Cup	Baltic competitions		European competitions	
2022–23	1	KML	7th	First round	Estonian-Latvian Basketball League	12th		
2023–24	1	KML	6th	Quarterfinalist	Estonian-Latvian Basketball League	12th	ENBL	6th (group stage)
2024–25	1	KML	6th	Quarterfinalist	Estonian-Latvian Basketball League	12th	European North Basketball League	RS
2025–26	1	KML	7th	Fourth place	Estonian-Latvian Basketball League	14th	European North Basketball League	RS
