= KK Viimsi =

Basketball team in Estonia

Viimsi
- Leagues: Korvpalli Meistriliiga; Estonian-Latvian Basketball League
- Founded: 30 October 2002; 23 years ago
- History: Korvpalliklubi Viimsi (2002–present)
- Arena: Forus Sports Center
- Capacity: 500
- Location: Haabneeme, Viimsi, Estonia
- Team colors: White, Black, Orange
- CEO: Tanel Einaste
- Head coach: Valdo Lips
- Website: kkviimsi.ee
Home	Away

Korvpalliklubi Viimsi (English: Basketball Club Viimsi) is a professional basketball club based in Haabneeme, Viimsi, Estonia. The team plays in the Estonian-Latvian Basketball League and the Korvpalli Meistriliiga (KML). Their home arena is the Forus Sports Center.

== History ==
KK Viimsi was founded in 2002 by Tanel Einaste, Anti Kalle and Teet Tiisvelt. In 2021, the team won the Estonian second division title and joined the Estonian-Latvian Basketball League. They reached the playoffs in their first season in the league. KK Viimsi/Sportland defeated BK Ventspils the quarterfinals and Pärnu Sadam in the semifinal to advance to the championship game, where they lost to VEF Riga, 64–95.

== Sponsorship naming ==
- KK Viimsi/Noto: 2017–2021
- KK Viimsi/Sportland: 2021–2023

== Home arenas ==
- Viimsi School Sports Hall (2011–2018)
- Forus Sports Center (2018–present)

== Players ==
=== Current roster ===
Note: Flags indicate national team eligibility at FIBA-sanctioned events. Players may hold other non-FIBA nationalities not displayed.

Viimsi roster
Players
Coaches

Pos.	No.	Nat.	Name	Ht.	Wt.	Age
C	0	(United States)	Buom, Mayuom	2.08 m (6 ft 10 in)		25 – 7 October 2001
SG	3	(Estonia)	Küttis, Ralf	1.97 m (6 ft 6 in)	81 kg (179 lb)	24 – 11 May 2002
PG	5	(Estonia)	Välb, Kaarel	1.93 m (6 ft 4 in)	81 kg (179 lb)	22 – 12 September 2004
PF	8	(Estonia)	Urvik, Erki	2.05 m (6 ft 9 in)	104 kg (229 lb)	24 – 7 May 2002
PF	11	(Estonia)	Jurtšenko, Karl Gustav	2.03 m (6 ft 8 in)	98 kg (216 lb)	22 – 10 February 2004
SF	13	(Estonia)	Kokk, Kristjan	2.01 m (6 ft 7 in)	90 kg (198 lb)	25 – 9 October 2001
SF	14	(Estonia)	Sünd, Kevin	1.97 m (6 ft 6 in)	95 kg (209 lb)	25 – 11 November 2000
C	17	(Estonia)	Suvi, Gert	2.11 m (6 ft 11 in)	102 kg (225 lb)	20 – 4 April 2006
PF	20	(Estonia)	Rannaste, Kristo	1.93 m (6 ft 4 in)	86 kg (190 lb)	19 – 28 March 2007
SG	21	(Estonia)	Tassa, Aleksander	1.95 m (6 ft 5 in)	92 kg (203 lb)	22 – 12 February 2004
SG	24	(Estonia)	Kask, Christian Elmar	1.92 m (6 ft 4 in)		18 – 12 October 2008
PF	32	(Estonia)	Kilk, Karmo	1.94 m (6 ft 4 in)	88 kg (194 lb)	21 – 23 January 2005
SF	44	(Estonia)	Reinart, Ken-Martti (C)	1.96 m (6 ft 5 in)	95 kg (209 lb)	23 – 10 February 2003
SG	50	(Estonia)	Pere, Oliver	1.94 m (6 ft 4 in)	88 kg (194 lb)	23 – 7 September 2003
SF	76	(Estonia)	Naska, Karl	1.93 m (6 ft 4 in)		18 – 27 February 2008
PF	88	(Estonia)	Sarap, Artur	2.00 m (6 ft 7 in)	81 kg (179 lb)	19 – 22 November 2006

Head coach

- (Estonia) Valdo Lips

Assistant coach(es)

- (Ukraine) Dmytro Kolomyichenko
- (Estonia) Martin Toomas

Legend

- (C) Team captain
- Injured

- Roster
Updated: 8 October 2026

=== Depth chart ===
Pos.	Starting 5	Bench 1	Bench 2
C	Mayuom Buom	Gert Suvi	Ken-Martti Reinart
PF	Erki Urvik	Karl Gustav Jurtsenko	Kristjan Kokk
SF	Ralf Küttis	Artur Sarap	Kevin Sünd
SG	Oliver Pere	Aleksander Tassa	Karmo Kilk
PG	Kaarel Välb	Christian Elmar Kask

== Head coaches ==
- Tanel Einaste 2011–2012, 2014–2015
- Valdo Lips 2013–2015, 2016–2021, 2021–present
- Indrek Ruut 2015–2016
- Martin Toomas 2021

== Season by season ==
Season	Tier	Division	Pos.	Estonian Cup	Baltic competitions	
2015–16	3	II liiga	25th			
2016–17	3	II liiga	1st	Second round		
2017–18	2	I liiga	7th			
2018–19	2	I liiga	3rd			
2019–20	2	I liiga	2nd (Note: The season was cancelled due to the COVID-19 pandemic.)			
2020–21	2	I liiga	1st	Quarterfinalist		
2021–22	1	KML	5th	Fourth place	Estonian-Latvian Basketball League	RU
2022–23	1	KML	4th	Runner-up	Estonian-Latvian Basketball League	8th
2023–24	1	KML	7th	Fourth place	Estonian-Latvian Basketball League	15th
2024–25	1	KML	7th	Quarterfinalist	Estonian-Latvian Basketball League	13th
2025–26	1	KML	5th	Quarterfinalist	Estonian-Latvian Basketball League	10th

== Trophies and awards ==
=== Trophies ===
- Estonian-Latvian League

Runners-up (1): 2021–22

- Estonian Cup

Runners-up (1): 2022

- Estonian 2nd League

Winners (1): 2020–21

- Estonian 3rd League

Winners (1): 2016–17

=== Individual awards ===
KML All-Star Five

- Karl Johan Lips – 2023

Estonian-Latvian League All-Star Five

- Tyler Roberson – 2022
