= Gregor Kuuba =

Estonian professional basketball player

No. 11 – BC Kalev
- Position: Small forward
- League: Korvpalli Meistriliiga; Estonian-Latvian Basketball League

Personal information
- Born: 8 October 2003 (age 23) Estonia
- Listed height: 2.01 m (6 ft 7 in)
- Listed weight: 96 kg (212 lb)

Career information
- Playing career: 2021–present

Career history
- 2021–2022: Libertas Livorno
- 2022–2024: Benedetto Cento
- 2024: TalTech
- 2024–present: BC Kalev

Career highlights
- Estonian League champion (2025); Estonian Cup winner (2025)
Medals
Men's basketball
Representing Estonia
FIBA Europe U-20 Championship Division B
Bronze medal – third place	2022 Georgia	U20 Team

Gregor Kuuba (born 8 October 2003) is an Estonian professional basketball player for BC Kalev of the Korvpalli Meistriliiga and the Estonian-Latvian Basketball League. Standing at 2.01 m, he plays at the small forward position.

== Professional career ==
For the 2022–23 season he signed with Benedetto Cento and started to play in Serie A2 league. He left the team at the end on 2024 since he didn't get playing time.

In the beginning of 2024, Gregor moved back to Estonia and signed with TalTech. After the end of the season he moved to Kalev/Cramo for the 2024–25 season and became the Estonian League champion at the end of season.

== National team career ==
Gregor Kuuba has represented Estonian U16, U18, U20 teams. He won bronze medal with Estonian U20 team at the 2022 FIBA U20 European Championship.

== Personal life ==
His sister is an Estonian badminton player Kristin Kuuba.
