= I liiga =

- Founded: 1992; 34 years ago
- Country: Estonia
- Confederation: FIBA Europe
- Number of teams: 12
- Level on pyramid: 2
- Promotion to: Korvpalli Meistriliiga
- Relegation to: II liiga
- Current champions: Paide Betmaster (2) (2025–26)
- Most championships: Kadrina Karud (3) Sk Nord/Betoonimeister (3)
- Website: basket.ee

The I liiga, also known as Saku I liiga for sponsorship reasons, is the second-tier basketball league in Estonia.

== Current teams ==
Teams for the 2026–27 season.

Team	Home city	Arena	Capacity
Audentese Spordigümnaasium	Tallinn	Audentes Sports Center	1,030
Eesti Maaülikool/Evocon	Tartu	Estonian University of Life Sciences Sports Hall	550
Haapsalu Herilased	Haapsalu	Haapsalu Wiedemann Sports Hall	600
Haljala NGU	Haljala	Rakvere Sports Hall	2,747
Paide Betmaster	Paide	Paide E-Piim Sports Hall	1,009
Rae Koss/Hansaviimistlus	Jüri	Jüri Sports Hall	485
Hepa Rapla	Rapla	Sadolin Sports Hall	958
Reinar Halliku Korvpallikool	Tallinn	Sports Center RING Sport	500
ROCK TARTU TERMINAL	Tartu	Turu Sports Hall	120
Tamsalu Los Toros Taltech/Citysport	Tallinn	TalTech Sports Hall	1,000
Tartu Ülikool/Estiko	Tartu	University of Tartu Sports Hall	2,600
Tere Kadrina Karud	Kadrina	Rakvere Sports Hall	2,747
