= Markus Ilver =

Estonian basketball player (born 2002)

No. 35 – Legia Warsaw
- Position: Power forward
- League: PLK; Champions League

Personal information
- Born: 30 January 2002 (age 24) Tallinn, Estonia
- Listed height: 2.06 m (6 ft 9 in)
- Listed weight: 102 kg (225 lb)

Career information
- College: Wisconsin (2021–2025)
- Playing career: 2018–present

Career history
- 2018: Audentes II
- 2018–2019: Audentes
- 2025–2026: Tartu Ülikool
- 2026–present: Legia Warsaw

Career highlights
- Estonian League champion (2026); Polish Supercup winner (2026); Estonian Cup winner (2026); Latvian–Estonian League All-Star Five (2026); KML All-Star Five (2026)
Medals
Men's basketball
Representing Estonia
FIBA Europe U-20 Championship Division B
Bronze medal – third place	2022 Georgia	U20 Team

Markus Ilver (born 30 January 2002) is an Estonian basketball player for Legia Warsaw of the Polish Basketball League (PLK). Standing at 2.06 m (6 ft 9 in), he plays at the power forward position. He played college basketball for the Wisconsin Badgers. Ilver also represents the Estonian national basketball team internationally.

== College career ==
On 16 April 2021, it was announced that Ilver will join the Wisconsin Badgers basketball team for the 2021–22 season.

== Professional career ==
Markus Ilver made his first professional contract with Tartu Ülikool. He won the Estonian Cup and championship with Tartu in the 2026 season. Ilver was also chosen to the KML All-Star Five.

On July 1, 2026, it was announced that Ilver will join Legia Warsaw where Heiko Rannula is head coach. He won the Polish Basketball Supercup at the start of the season and scored 25 points in the final.

== National team career ==
Markus Ilver made his debut for the Estonian national team on 1 December 2025 against Czechia, playing 21 minutes and scoring 11 points.

== Career statistics ==
Legend
GP	Games played	GS	Games started	MPG	Minutes per game
FG%	Field-goal percentage	3P%	3-point field-goal percentage	FT%	Free-throw percentage
RPG	Rebounds per game	APG	Assists per game	SPG	Steals per game
BPG	Blocks per game	PPG	Points per game	PIR	Performance index rating
**Bold**	Career high

=== College ===
Year	Team	GP	GS	MPG	FG%	3P%	FT%	RPG	APG	SPG	BPG	PPG
2021–22	Wisconsin	8	0	3.6	.125	.000	.750	.5	.0	.0	.0	.6
2022–23	Wisconsin	18	0	**6.6**	.297	.238	**1.000**	.9	**.2**	.1	.0	**1.6**
2023–24	Wisconsin	**27**	0	5.9	.314	.250	.667	**1.3**	**.2**	**.2**	**.1**	1.1
2024–25	Wisconsin	20	0	3.5	**.357**	**.333**	**1.000**	.5	.1	.1	**.1**	**1.6**
Career		73	0	5.2	.306	.253	.846	.9	.1	.1	.1	1.3
