= Siim-Markus Post =

Estonian professional basketball player

No. 1 – TalTech
- Position: Point guard / shooting guard
- League: Korvpalli Meistriliiga; Latvian–Estonian Basketball League; European North Basketball League

Personal information
- Born: 13 February 1997 (age 29) Kohtla-Järve, Estonia
- Listed height: 1.84 m (6 ft 0 in)
- Listed weight: 87 kg (192 lb)

Career history
- 2013–2014: HITO
- 2012–2013: →HITO II
- 2013–2016: Audentes/Noortekoondis
- 2016–2017: Rakvere Tarvas
- 2017–2020: BC Pärnu
- 2020–2021: Tallinna Kalev
- 2021–2022: BC Pärnu
- 2022–2023: KK Viimsi
- 2023–2024: BC Pärnu
- 2024–present: TalTech

Career highlights
- KML All-Star Five (2024); 2× Estonian League Best Young Player (2015, 2017)

Siim-Markus Post (born 13 February 1997) is an Estonian professional basketball player for TalTech of the Estonian–Latvian Basketball League. He also represents the Estonian national team. Standing at 1.84 m (6 ft 0 in), he plays at the point guard position.

== National team career ==
Post made his debut for the Estonian national team on 26 July 2020, in a 84–67 victory over Latvia.

== Awards and accomplishments ==
=== Individual ===
- 2× Estonian League Best Young Player: (2015, 2017)
