= Frankie Fidler =

American basketball player (born 2003)

No. 35 – Sabah BC
- Position: Small forward
- League: Azerbaijan Basketball League; Champions League

Personal information
- Born: April 25, 2003 (age 23) Bellevue, Nebraska, U.S.
- Listed height: 6 ft 7 in (2.01 m)
- Listed weight: 217 lb (98 kg)

Career information
- High school: Bellevue West High School (Bellevue, Nebraska)
- College: Omaha (2021-24); Michigan State (2024-25)
- NBA draft: 2025: undrafted
- Playing career: 2025–present

Career history
- 2025–2026: Rīgas Zeļļi
- 2026–present: Sabah BC

Frankie William Fidler (born April 25, 2003) is an American professional basketball player for Sabah BC of the Azerbaijan Basketball League (ABL).

== College career ==
Spent three years at Omaha and was named First Team All-Summit Conference in 2023-24 after averaging 20.1 points per game, 6.3 rebounds and 2.6 assists per game. In 2024 transferred to Michigan State. Appeared in all 37 games, starting seven times. Averaged 7.0 points per game, while adding 3.3 rebounds in 16.2 minutes per game.

== Professional career ==
=== Rīgas Zeļļi (2025–2026) ===
On August 19, 2025, Fidler signed with Rīgas Zeļļi to play in the Latvian-Estonian Basketball League and European North Basketball League.

=== Sabah BC (2026–present) ===
On August 12, 2026, he signed with Sabah BC of the Azerbaijan Basketball League.

== Personal life ==
Frankie is the son of Chris and Sandy Fidler. He has a brother, Louis, and a sister, Ruby. Louis played basketball at Morningside University.
