= Martin Paasoja =

Estonian basketball player

No. 40 – Tartu Ülikool
- Position: Shooting guard
- League: Korvpalli Meistriliiga; Estonian-Latvian Basketball League

Personal information
- Born: 4 January 1993 (age 33) Kärdla, Estonia
- Listed height: 1.91 m (6 ft 3 in)
- Listed weight: 86 kg (190 lb)

Career information
- NBA draft: 2015: undrafted
- Playing career: 2009–present

Career history
- 2009–2012: BC Pärnu
- 2012–2017: Rapla KK
- 2017–2018: SCM CSU Craiova
- 2018–2019: Psychikou
- 2019–2020: BC Kalev
- 2020–2021: Real Valladolid
- 2021–2022: Rapla KK
- 2022–2023: ÍR
- 2023–2024: Rapla KK
- 2024–present: Tartu Ülikool

Career highlights
- Estonian League champion (2026); Estonian Cup winner (2026); KML All-Star Five (2017)

Martin Paasoja (born 4 January 1993) is an Estonian professional basketball player for Tartu Ülikool of the Korvpalli Meistriliiga. He is a 1.91 m (6 ft 3 in) tall shooting guard. He also represents the Estonian national basketball team internationally.

== Professional career ==
In September 2022, Paasoja signed with ÍR of the Úrvalsdeild karla.

In April 2023, Paasoja joined Venezuelan top-tier team Centauros de Portuguesa.

== Estonian national team ==
Paasoja was a member of the junior Estonian national team that finished 15th in the 2012 FIBA Europe Under-20 Championship and 19th in the 2013 FIBA Europe Under-20 Championship.

== Career statistics ==
Legend
| GP | Games played | GS | Games started | MPG | Minutes per game |
| FG% | Field-goal percentage | 3P% | 3-point field-goal percentage | FT% | Free-throw percentage |
| RPG | Rebounds per game | APG | Assists per game | SPG | Steals per game |
| BPG | Blocks per game | PPG | Points per game | PIR | Performance index rating |
| **Bold** | Career high |

=== Domestic leagues ===
| Season | Team | League | GP | MPG | FG% | 3P% | FT% | RPG | APG | SPG | BPG | PPG |
|---|---|---|---|---|---|---|---|---|---|---|---|---|
| 2009–10 | Pärnu | KML | 18 | 12.0 | .361 | .316 | .435 | 1.8 | .2 | .6 | .1 | 4.2 |
| 2010–11 | Pärnu | KML | 30 | 24.1 | .371 | .364 | .585 | 4.1 | .8 | 1.5 | .2 | 8.5 |
| 2011–12 | Pärnu | KML | 3 | 28.2 | .235 | .222 | .800 | 4.3 | 1.0 | 2.3 | .0 | 8.7 |
| 2012–13 | Rapla | KML | 37 | 23.5 | .425 | .320 | .702 | 3.5 | 1.6 | 1.0 | .2 | 7.6 |
| 2013–14 | Rapla | KML | 33 | 20.7 | .354 | .229 | .646 | 3.1 | 1.1 | 1.3 | .3 | 7.0 |
| 2014–15 | Rapla | KML | 20 | 25.4 | .405 | .306 | .769 | 3.8 | 1.8 | .9 | .1 | 8.9 |
| 2015–16 | Rapla | KML | 39 | 25.9 | .397 | .252 | .775 | 2.9 | 2.3 | 1.0 | .2 | 8.5 |
| 2016–17 | Rapla | KML | 38 | 30.3 | .416 | .333 | .791 | 3.9 | 2.7 | 1.0 | .2 | 11.5 |
| 2017–18 | SCM CSU Craiova | Liga Națională | 30 | 23.6 | .481 | .392 | .810 | 2.1 | 2.4 | 1.2 | .0 | 11.0 |
| 2018–19 | Psychikou | Greek A2 | 30 | 32.9 | .459 | .299 | .771 | 4.8 | 2.1 | 1.7 | .1 | 15.5 |
| 2019–20 | Kalev/Cramo | LEBL | 19 | 15.2 | .438 | .308 | .829 | 1.6 | 2.3 | 1.1 | .1 | 8.2 |

=== Estonia national team ===
| Year | Tournament | National Team | GP | GS | MPG | FG% | 3P% | FT% | RPG | APG | SPG | BPG | PPG |
|---|---|---|---|---|---|---|---|---|---|---|---|---|---|
| 2010 | 2010 FIBA Europe Under-18 Championship Division B | Estonia U-18 | 8 | 0 | 13.4 | .489 | .125 | .538 | 2.0 | .4 | 1.1 | .5 | 6.9 |
| 2011 | 2011 FIBA Europe Under-18 Championship Division B | Estonia U-18 | 3 | 1 | 22.7 | .125 | .000 | .667 | 2.7 | 3.0 | 1.3 | .0 | 2.0 |
| 2012 | 2012 FIBA Europe Under-20 Championship | Estonia U-20 | 9 | 5 | 28.4 | .424 | .270 | .733 | 6.2 | 1.2 | 1.0 | .0 | 11.7 |
| 2013 | 2013 FIBA Europe Under-20 Championship | Estonia U-20 | 9 | 8 | 28.5 | .350 | .319 | .567 | 5.3 | 1.2 | 2.2 | .4 | 11.3 |
| 2015 | 2015 Summer Universiade | Estonia Universiade | 7 | | 14.0 | .258 | .083 | .800 | 1.7 | .3 | .6 | .0 | 3.0 |
| 2016 | EuroBasket 2017 Qualification | Estonia | 6 | 0 | 6.5 | .444 | .000 | 1.000 | .8 | .5 | .2 | .2 | 1.7 |
| 2017 | 2019 Basketball World Cup Pre-Qualifiers | Estonia | 4 | 2 | 17.6 | .571 | .333 | .571 | 2.8 | 2.2 | .6 | .0 | 5.5 |
| 2017–19 | 2019 Basketball World Cup Qualification | Estonia | 11 | 6 | 15.3 | .488 | .286 | .600 | 1.5 | 1.0 | .9 | .1 | 5.5 |
