= Keila KK =

Basketball team in Estonia

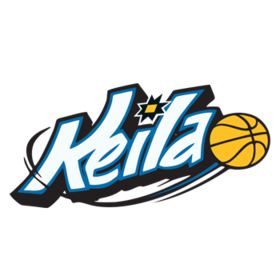
- League: Korvpalli Meistriliiga; Estonian-Latvian Basketball League
- Founded: 2010; 16 years ago
- History: Keila Korvpallikool (2010–present)
- Arena: Keila Health Center
- Capacity: 800
- Location: Keila, Estonia
- Team colors: White, Blue
- Head coach: Alessio Landra
- Website: keilakk.eu
Home	Away

Keila Korvpallikool (English: Keila Basketball School) is a basketball team based in Keila, Estonia. The team plays in the Estonian-Latvian Basketball League and the Korvpalli Meistriliiga (KML). Their home arena is the Keila Health Center.

== History ==
Keila Korvpallikool was founded in 2010. Keila's first team joined the Estonian-Latvian Basketball League for the 2022–23 season.

Keila KK parted ways with Keila Basket in 2024 and will countinue next season separately under their own license in the Estonian-Latvian Basketball League and in the Korvpalli Meistriliiga.

== Sponsorship naming ==
- Keila Coolbet: 2023–2024

== Home arenas ==
- Keila Health Center (2012–present)

== Players ==
=== Current roster ===
Note: Flags indicate national team eligibility at FIBA-sanctioned events. Players may hold other non-FIBA nationalities not displayed.

Keila KK roster
Players
Coaches

Pos.	No.	Nat.	Name	Ht.	Wt.	Age
PF	1	(United States)	Carr, Phillip	2.06 m (6 ft 9 in)	97 kg (214 lb)	31 – 20 October 1995
SG	2	(Estonia)	Aav, Sverre	1.93 m (6 ft 4 in)	86 kg (190 lb)	24 – 3 January 2002
SF	3	(Estonia)	Ermakov, Kirill	1.87 m (6 ft 2 in)	75 kg (165 lb)	16 – 23 February 2010
PG	5	(Estonia)	Rumm, Remi-Andero	1.84 m (6 ft 0 in)		19 – 25 February 2007
PF	7	(Belgium)	Mark, Tom	2.01 m (6 ft 7 in)	91 kg (201 lb)	25 – 15 January 2001
SF	9	(Estonia)	Rüütel, Eke	2.05 m (6 ft 9 in)	80 kg (176 lb)	22 – 27 May 2004
SG	10	(United States)	Carter, PJ	1.93 m (6 ft 4 in)	83 kg (183 lb)	25 – 7 October 2001
PF	11	(Ukraine)	Shymanskyi, Vitalii	2.05 m (6 ft 9 in)	107 kg (236 lb)	23 – 11 March 2003
PF	12	(Estonia)	Aimre, Henri	2.04 m (6 ft 8 in)	84 kg (185 lb)	19 – 9 February 2007
C	13	(Estonia)	Matute Perner, Karl Andres	2.05 m (6 ft 9 in)	94 kg (207 lb)	25 – 6 March 2001
PG	21	(Estonia)	Kirsipuu, Johannes	1.88 m (6 ft 2 in)	82 kg (181 lb)	24 – 4 February 2002
SF	40	(Estonia)	Peemot, Patrik (C)	1.90 m (6 ft 3 in)	85 kg (187 lb)	25 – 7 August 2001
PF	42	(Estonia)	Põldroos, Jakob Raiden	1.87 m (6 ft 2 in)	90 kg (198 lb)	18 – 18 January 2008

Head coach

- (Italy) Alessio Landra

Assistant coach(es)

- (Estonia) Joosep Indermitte
- (Estonia) Oliver Uuspõld

Legend

- (C) Team captain
- Injured

- Roster
Updated: 22 October 2026

=== Depth chart ===
Pos.	Starting 5	Bench 1	Bench 2
C	Vitalii Shymanskyi	Karl Andres Matute Perner
PF	Tom Mark	Patrik Peemot	Henri Aimre
SF	Colin Golson Jr.	Eke Rüütel
SG	Sverre Aav	PJ Carter
PG	Johannes Kirsipuu	Remi Andero Rumm

== Coaches ==
- (Estonia) Märt Kermon 2012–2014
- (Estonia) Peep Pahv 2014–2024
- (Estonia) Andres Sõber 2024–2026
- (Italy) Alessio Landra 2026–present

== Season by season ==
Season	Tier	Division	Pos.	Estonian Cup	Baltic competitions		Regional competitions	
2015–16	3	II liiga	22nd	First round				
2016–17	3	II liiga	6th	First round				
2017–18	3	II liiga	6th					
2018–19	3	II liiga	4th					
2019–20	3	II liiga	1st (Note: The season was cancelled due to the COVID-19 pandemic.)					
2020–21	2	I liiga	9th	Second round				
2021–22	2	I liiga	3rd	Second round				
2022–23*	1	KML	7th	First round	Estonian-Latvian Basketball League	12th		
2023–24*	1	KML	6th	Quarterfinalist	Estonian-Latvian Basketball League	12th	European North Basketball League	RS
2024–25	1	KML	8th	Quarterfinalist	Estonian-Latvian Basketball League	14th		
2025–26	1	KML	6th	Quarterfinalist	Estonian-Latvian Basketball League	12th		

* technically played by Keila Basket
