= BC Pärnu =

Estonian basketball team

- Leagues: Korvpalli Meistriliiga; Estonian-Latvian Basketball League; Europe Cup
- Founded: 2000; 26 years ago
- History: KK Pärnu (2000–2017); KK Paulus (2017–present)
- Arena: Pärnu Sports Hall
- Capacity: 1,820
- Location: Pärnu, Estonia
- Team colors: White, Black, Blue
- Head coach: Kristjan Evart
- Championships: 1 Estonian Championship
- Website: bcparnu.ee
Home	Away

BC Pärnu is a professional basketball club based in Pärnu, Estonia. The team plays in the Estonian-Latvian Basketball League and the Korvpalli Meistriliiga (KML). Their home arena is the Pärnu Sports Hall. In 2022, the team won their first and only KML title.

== History ==
Korvpalliklubi Pärnu (English: Basketball Club Pärnu) was founded in 2000. In 2006, the team joined the Korvpalli Meistriliiga (KML), the top tier of Estonian basketball. They also made their debut in the Baltic Basketball League (BBL) in 2012. On 12 July 2017, KK Pärnu announced that they will withdraw from the forthcoming KML season due to financial difficulties. However, the team would stay in the KML after reaching an agreement with KK Paulus.

In 2018, the Estonian-Latvian Basketball League was formed. Pärnu Sadam reached the playoffs in the league's inaugural season, where they lost to BK Ventspils in the quarterfinals. In the 2019 KML Playoffs, Pärnu Sadam defeated AVIS UTILITAS Rapla in the quarterfinals, but lost to BC Kalev/Cramo in the semifinals. In the third-place games, they defeated TalTech. Pärnu Sadam made the KML Finals for the first time in team history in 2021. However, they could not overcome BC Kalev/Cramo and lost the series three games to one. The team finished the 2021–22 Estonian-Latvian Basketball League season in third place. They lost 81–83 to KK Viimsi/Sportland in the semifinal but beat BK Ogre 84–77 in the third place game. In the 2022 KML Playoffs, Pärnu Sadam defeated AVIS UTILITAS Rapla the quarterfinals and the defending champion BC Kalev/Cramo in the semifinals to advance to the finals for the second consecutive year. They swept Tartu Ülikool Maks & Moorits in three games to win their first Estonian championship. Andris Misters was named the KML Finals MVP.

Heiko Rannula, who had coached the team since 2014, left Pärnu after the 2021–22 season to join BC Kalev/Cramo. After failing to qualify for the Champions League, the team played in the FIBA Europe Cup, but didn't advance past the regular season. Pärnu Sadam were unable to defend their KML title, falling in the semifinals to Tartu Ülikool Maks & Moorits. They did, however, beat Viimsi/Sportland in the third-place series.

== Sponsorship naming ==
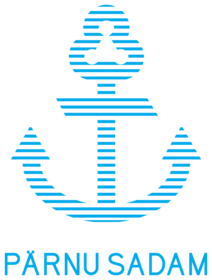
BC Pärnu logo from 2015 to 2025.

- KK Pärnu/Catwees: 2007–2009
- Pärnu Sadam (Port of Pärnu): 2015–2025
- Transcom Pärnu: 2025–2026

== Home arenas ==
- Pärnu School Gymnasium (2006–2009)
- Pärnu Sports Hall (2009–present)

== Players ==
=== Current roster ===
Note: Flags indicate national team eligibility at FIBA-sanctioned events. Players may hold other non-FIBA nationalities not displayed.

BC Pärnu roster
Players
Coaches

Pos.	No.	Nat.	Name	Ht.	Wt.	Age
PG	0	(Latvia)	Birkāns, Renārs	1.86 m (6 ft 1 in)	82 kg (181 lb)	29 – 26 June 1997
PG	1	(United States)	Jones, Javeon	1.85 m (6 ft 1 in)	75 kg (165 lb)	26 – 12 February 2000
SF	3	(Estonia)	Hermet, Roger	1.96 m (6 ft 5 in)	85 kg (187 lb)	19 – 4 October 2007
PF	5	(Estonia)	Eelmäe, Hendrik	1.98 m (6 ft 6 in)	85 kg (187 lb)	26 – 26 October 2000
SG	7	(Estonia)	Roman, Jesper	1.90 m (6 ft 3 in)	78 kg (172 lb)	18 – 7 September 2008
PF	8	(Estonia)	Kirves, Mihkel (C)	2.00 m (6 ft 7 in)	89 kg (196 lb)	29 – 6 December 1996
PF	10	(Georgia (country))	Tsartsidze, Tsotne	2.02 m (6 ft 8 in)	90 kg (198 lb)	26 – 28 March 2000
C	15	(Latvia)	Dubults, Klāvs	2.04 m (6 ft 8 in)	91 kg (201 lb)	30 – 16 August 1996
PF	16	(Estonia)	Lootus, Kaspar	2.00 m (6 ft 7 in)	88 kg (194 lb)	25 – 19 March 2001
SG	20	(Finland)	Heinonen, Joona	1.90 m (6 ft 3 in)	79 kg (174 lb)	22 – 21 May 2004
SF	27	(Estonia)	Suurorg, Kaur Erik	1.98 m (6 ft 6 in)	85 kg (187 lb)	22 – 27 May 2004
PG	55	(Ukraine)	Sydorov, Illya	1.82 m (6 ft 0 in)	75 kg (165 lb)	29 – 4 December 1996

Head coach

- (Estonia) Kristjan Evart

Assistant coach(es)

- (Estonia) Gert Kullamäe
- (Estonia) Martin Müürsepp

Legend

- (C) Team captain
- Injured

- Roster
Updated: 10 November 2026

=== Depth chart ===
Pos.	Starting 5	Bench 1	Bench 2
C	Klāvs Dubults	Tsotne Tsartsidze
PF	Mihkel Kirves	Kaspar Lootus
SF	Hendrik Eelmäe	Roger Hermet
SG	Joona Heinonen	Javeon Jones	Kaur Erik Suurorg
PG	Illya Sydorov	Renārs Birkāns	Jesper Roman

=== Squad changes for/during the 2026–27 season ===
==== In ====
No.	Pos.	Nat.	Name	Moving from	
8	PF/C	(Estonia)	Mihkel Kirves	BC Jonava	(Lithuania)
15	PF/C	(Latvia)	Klāvs Dubults	Landstede Hammers	(Netherlands)
55	PG	(Ukraine)	Illya Sydorov	BK VEF Rīga	(Latvia)
1	CG	(United States)	Javeon Christopher Jones	Keila KK	(Estonia)
20	PG	(Finland)	Joona Heinonen	Kouvot	(Finland)
27	SF	(Estonia)	Kaur Erik Suurorg	Tartu Ülikool	(Estonia)
	CG	(Estonia)	Jesper Roman	Audentese SG/Swedbank	(Estonia)
13	G/F	(Estonia)	Roger Hermet	Audentese SG/Swedbank	(Estonia)
10	PF/C	(Georgia (country))	Tsotne Tsartsidze	IR Reykjavik	(Iceland)

== Head coaches ==
- (Estonia) Indrek Ruut 2006–2009
- (Estonia) Rait Käbin 2009–2012
- (Estonia) Priit Vene 2012–2013
- (Serbia) Darko Ivanović 2013–2014
- (Estonia) Mait Käbin 2014–2016
- (Estonia) Heiko Rannula 2016–2022
- (Estonia) Toomas Annuk 2022
- (Estonia) Gert Kullamäe 2022–2024
- (Ukraine) Vitaly Stepanovskyy 2024
- (Estonia) Kristjan Evart 2024–present

== Season by season ==
Season	Tier	Division	Pos.	Estonian Cup	Baltic competitions		European competitions	
2006–07	1	KML	10th	Quarterfinalist				
2007–08	1	KML	7th	Quarterfinalist				
2008–09	1	KML	7th	Fourth place				
2009–10	1	KML	7th	Fourth place				
2010–11	1	KML	8th	Quarterfinalist				
2011–12	1	KML	7th	Quarterfinalist				
2012–13	1	KML	6th		Baltic Basketball League	T16		
2013–14	1	KML	6th	Fourth place	Baltic Basketball League	RS		
2014–15	1	KML	5th	Quarterfinalist	Baltic Basketball League	EF		
2015–16	1	KML	6th	Quarterfinalist	Baltic Basketball League	EF		
2016–17	1	KML	4th	Third place	Baltic Basketball League	EF		
2017–18	1	KML	4th		Baltic Basketball League	QF		
2018–19	1	KML	3rd		Estonian-Latvian Basketball League	8th		
2019–20	1	KML	3rd (Note: The season was cancelled due to the COVID-19 pandemic.)		Estonian-Latvian Basketball League	–		
2020–21	1	KML	2nd	Third place	Estonian-Latvian Basketball League	T6		
2021–22	1	KML	1st	Quarterfinalist	Estonian-Latvian Basketball League	3rd	4 FIBA Europe Cup	QR
2022–23	1	KML	3rd	Quarterfinalist	Estonian-Latvian Basketball League	11th	3 Champions League	QR
2022–23	1	KML	3rd	Quarterfinalist	Estonian-Latvian Basketball League	11th	4 FIBA Europe Cup	RS
2023–24	1	KML	4th	Third place	Estonian-Latvian Basketball League	8th	4 FIBA Europe Cup	QT
2024–25	1	KML	5th	Quarterfinalist	Estonian-Latvian Basketball League	11th	4 FIBA Europe Cup	RS
2025–26	1	KML	4th	Quarterfinalist	Estonian-Latvian Basketball League	8th	4 FIBA Europe Cup	Q
2026–27	1	KML		TBD	Estonian-Latvian Basketball League		4 FIBA Europe Cup	RS

== Trophies and awards ==
=== Trophies ===
- Estonian League

Winners (1): 2021–2022
Runners-up (1): 2020–2021

=== Individual awards ===
KML Finals MVP

- Andris Misters – 2022

KML Best Defender

- Mihkel Kirves – 2017, 2018, 2019
- Märt Rosenthal – 2021

KML Best Young Player

- Norman Käbin – 2016
- Hugo Toom – 2021

KML Coach of the Year

- Heiko Rannula – 2022

KML All-Star Five

- Demetre Rivers – 2019
- Edon Maxhuni – 2021
- Alterique Gilbert – 2022
- Mihkel Kirves – 2022, 2023
- Robert Valge – 2022
- Devin Harris – 2026

Estonian-Latvian League All-Star Five

- Robert Valge – 2022
