= Nord Sports Hall =

Sports venue in Tallinn

- Nord Spordihoone
- Interactive map of Nord Sports Hall
- Former names: Tiit Soku Korvpallikool (2002–2018)
- Location: Tervise 21, Mustamäe, Tallinn, Estonia
- Coordinates: 59°23′42″N 24°42′2″E
- Owner: AS Tallinna Arendused
- Operator: MTÜ Spordiklubi Nord
- Capacity: Basketball: 1,066

Construction
- Opened: 2002

Tenants
- BC Tallinna Kalev (2021–2022, 2023–2024); BC Kalev (2025–present)

Website
- Official website

Nord Sports Hall (Estonian: Nord Spordihoone) is a multi-purpose indoor arena in Mustamäe, Tallinn. It was opened in 2002 and is owned by the City of Tallinn company AS Tallinna Arendused. It can hold up to 1,066 people.

== History ==
=== Tiit Sokk Basketballschool ===
The hall was built for olympic winner Tiit Soku's personal basketball school. It was one of the first sports halls built in Estonia which construction was privately funded.

=== Nord Sports Hall ===
In June 2018, City of Tallinn bought the hall from Tiit Sokk for two million euros. Since then the owner of the hall is Tallinn company AS Tallinna Arendused. After the deal, they started looking for a tenant, which became Nord Sports Club.

== See also ==
- List of indoor arenas in Estonia
