= University of Tartu Sports Hall =

Sport hall in Tartu, Estonia

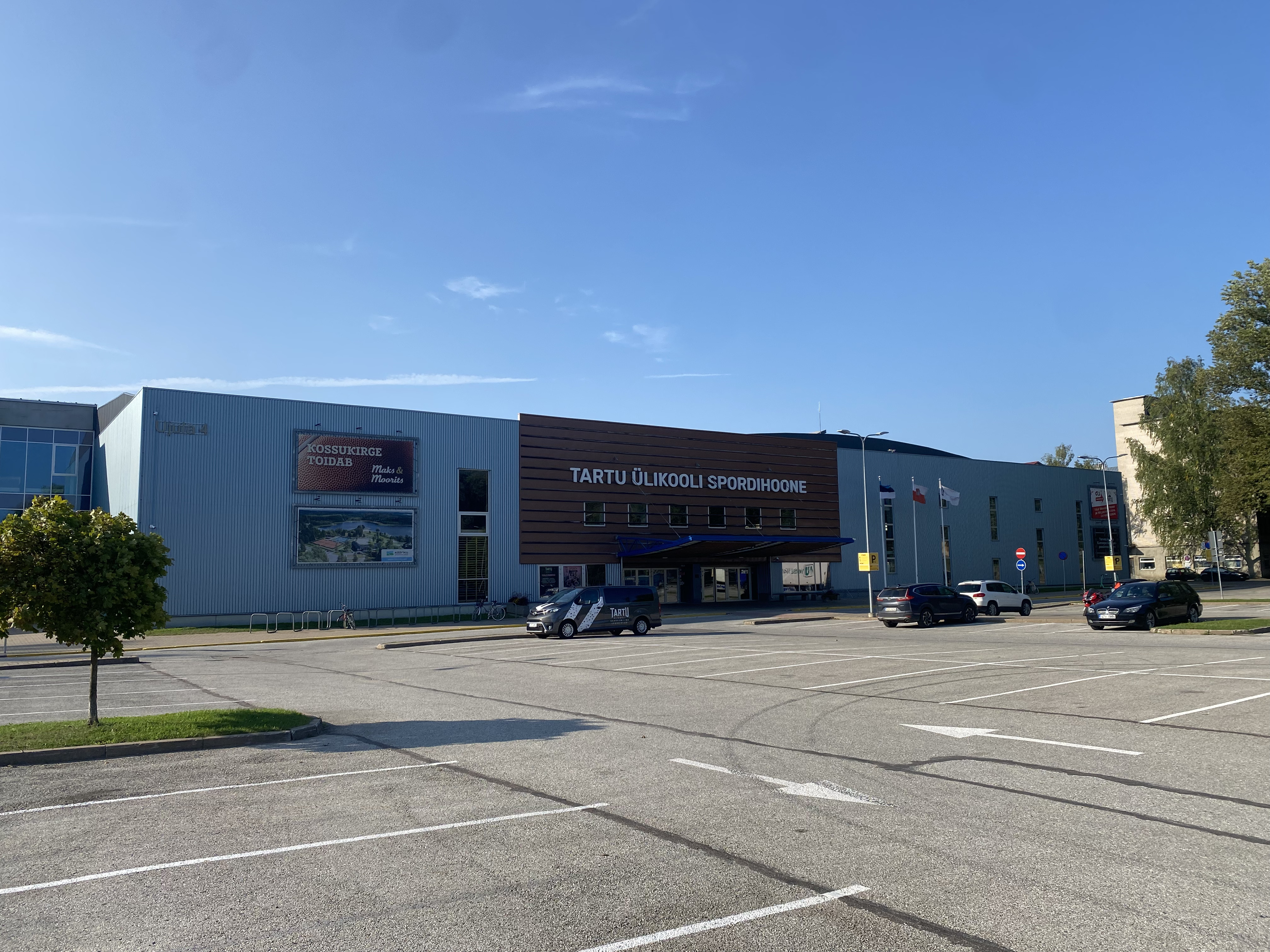
- Interactive map of University of Tartu Sports Hall
- Location: Ujula 4, Tartu, Estonia
- Coordinates: 58°23′19.1″N 26°43′19.71″E
- Owner: University of Tartu Academic Sports Club
- Capacity: Basketball: 2,600

Construction
- Opened: 1982

Tenants
- University of Tartu basketball team (1982–present); Tartu Volleyball

Website
- Official website

University of Tartu Sports Hall (Estonian: Tartu Ülikooli Spordihoone) is a multi-purpose indoor arena complex in Tartu. It was opened in 1982 and is owned by the University of Tartu Academic Sports Club.

It's located on the left bank of the Emajõgi, in Ülejõe neighbourhood.

== See also ==
- List of indoor arenas in Estonia
