= TalTech Sports Hall =

Sports venue in Tallinn

TalTech Spordihoone
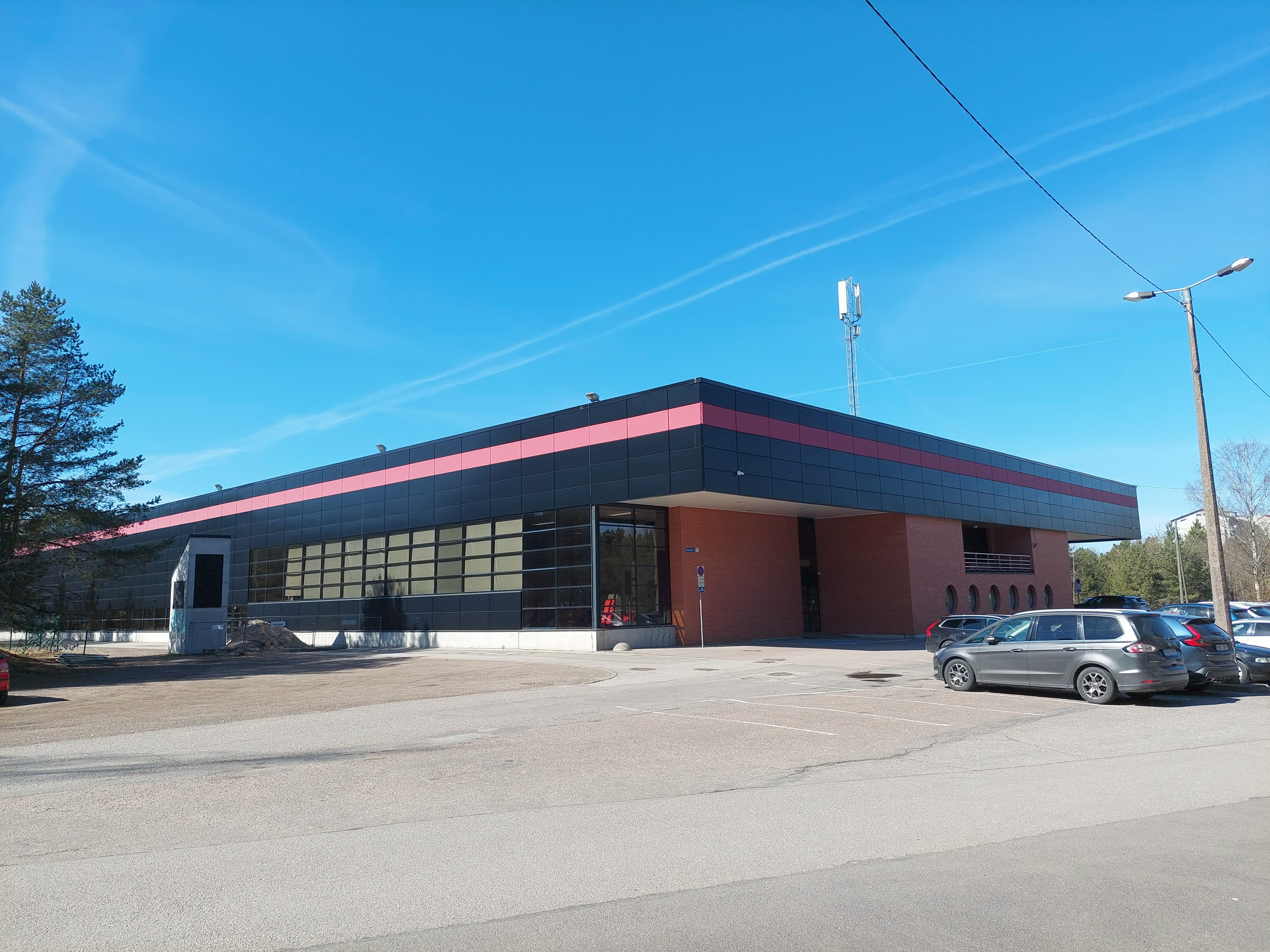
- TalTech Sports Hall in 2026
- Interactive map of TalTech Spordihoone
- Location: Männiliiva 7, Tallinn, Estonia
- Coordinates: 59°23′36.78″N 24°40′41.29″E
- Owner: Tallinn University of Technology
- Capacity: Basketball: 1,000

Construction
- Opened: 1975

Tenants
- TalTech Basketball (KML) (1985–present); TTÜ VK

Website
- Official website

The TalTech Sports Hall (Estonian: TalTech Spordihoone) is a multi-purpose indoor arena complex in Mustamäe, Tallinn. It was opened in 1975 and renovated in 2001. It is the current home arena of the TalTech Basketball team.

360° view on the Tallinn University of Technology sports hall

== See also ==
- List of indoor arenas in Estonia
