= 2021 KML playoffs =

Estonian national championships in basketball

Tournament details
- Dates: 19 April – 17 May 2021
- Season: 2020–21
- Teams: 7

Final positions
- Champions: BC Kalev/Cramo (12th title)

The 2021 KML playoffs was the postseason tournament of the Korvpalli Meistriliiga's 2020–21 season. The playoffs began on 19 April and ended on 17 May. The games were played without spectators due to COVID-19 pandemic. The tournament concluded with BC Kalev/Cramo defeating Pärnu Sadam three games to one in the finals. Chavaughn Lewis was named KML Finals MVP.

== Bracket ==
Quarterfinals
4	Rakvere Tarvas	2
5	TalTech	0
2	Pärnu Sadam	2
7	Tallinna Kalev/TLÜ	0
3	AVIS UTILITAS Rapla	2
6	Tartu Ülikool Maks & Moorits	1

Semifinals
1	BC Kalev/Cramo	3
4	Rakvere Tarvas	0
2	Pärnu Sadam	3
3	AVIS UTILITAS Rapla	0

Finals
1	BC Kalev/Cramo	3
2	Pärnu Sadam	1
Third place
3	AVIS UTILITAS Rapla	3
4	Rakvere Tarvas	2

== Quarterfinals ==
The quarterfinals are best-of-three series.

=== Pärnu Sadam vs. Tallinna Kalev/TLÜ ===
19 April Game 1	Pärnu Sadam	88–76 (Series: 1–0)	Tallinna Kalev/TLÜ	Pärnu
19:00	Scoring by quarter: 18–21, 24–22, 17–19, 29–14
	Pts: Jaunzems, Valge 15; Rebs: Kangur, Kirves 11; Asts: Kangur, Rosenthal 5 PIR: Kangur, Toom 19	Report	Pts: Paiste, Williams 21; Rebs: McLaughlin 10; Asts: Lips 6 PIR: Williams 23	Arena: Pärnu Sports Hall; Referees: Rain Peerandi, Alex Talisainen, Hendrik Laas

22 April Game 2	Tallinna Kalev/TLÜ	68–78 (Series: 0–2)	Pärnu Sadam	Tallinn
19:00	Scoring by quarter: 15–15, 20–13, 23–19, 10–31
	Pts: Williams 19; Rebs: Lips 11; Asts: Williams 5 PIR: Williams 22	Report	Pts: Jaunzems 20; Rebs: Jaunzems 8 Asts: Maxhuni, Rosenthal 5 PIR: Jaunzems 26	Arena: Sõle Sports Centre; Referees: Aare Halliko, Ranno Konks, Rainis Värv

=== AVIS UTILITAS Rapla vs. Tartu Ülikool Maks & Moorits ===
20 April Game 1	AVIS UTILITAS Rapla	67–77 (Series: 0–1)	Tartu Ülikool Maks & Moorits	Rapla
20:00	Scoring by quarter: 17–25, 22–8, 16–18, 12–26
	Pts: S. Kaldre 16; Rebs: Aminu 12; Asts: Sutt 7 PIR: Aminu 29	Report	Pts: Barton 22; Rebs: Wembi 11; Asts: Barton 7 PIR: Wembi 29	Arena: Sadolin Sports Hall; Referees: Rain Peerandi, Mart Uuehendrik, Rainis Värv

23 April Game 2	Tartu Ülikool Maks & Moorits	54–74 (Series: 1–1)	AVIS UTILITAS Rapla	Tartu
18:00	Scoring by quarter: 13–12, 13–24, 16–13, 12–25
	Pts: Eelmäe 14; Rebs: Wembi 13; Asts: Barton, Wembi 4 PIR: Wembi 18	Report	Pts: Childress 21; Rebs: three players 7 Asts: T. Kaldre 6 PIR: Childress 24	Arena: University of Tartu Sports Hall; Referees: Mihkel Männiste, Alex Talisainen, Janek Saluse

24 April Game 3	AVIS UTILITAS Rapla	83–55 (Series: 2–1)	Tartu Ülikool Maks & Moorits	Rapla
19:00	Scoring by quarter: 19–14, 25–16, 17–15, 22–10
	Pts: Childress 20; Rebs: Aminu 9 Asts: Childress 7 PIR: Childress 24	Report	Pts: three players 10; Rebs: Suurorg 6 Asts: Suurorg 4 PIR: Suurorg 14	Arena: Sadolin Sports Hall; Referees: Aare Halliko, Rain Peerandi, Ranno Konks

=== Rakvere Tarvas vs. TalTech ===
20 April Game 1	Rakvere Tarvas	86–75 (Series: 1–0)	TalTech	Rakvere
18:00	Scoring by quarter: 19–29, 30–27, 20–14, 17–5
	Pts: Gludītis 22; Rebs: Hayes 8 Asts: Harris 9 PIR: Harris 28	Report	Pts: Raadik 16; Rebs: Metsalu 7 Asts: Metsalu 3 PIR: Raadik 18	Arena: Rakvere Sports Hall; Referees: Mihkel Männiste, Ranno Konks, Janek Saluse

24 April Game 2	TalTech	69–71 (Series: 0–2)	Rakvere Tarvas	Tallinn
17:00	Scoring by quarter: 20–17, 17–13, 15–25, 17–16
	Pts: Metsalu 22; Rebs: Matute Perner 11; Asts: Keedus, Metsalu 4 PIR: Metsalu 25	Report	Pts: Harris 17; Rebs: Saaremäel 7 Asts: three players 3 PIR: Harris 28	Arena: TalTech Sports Hall; Referees: Mart Uuehendrik, Alex Talisainen, Hendrik Laas

== Semifinals ==
The quarterfinals are best-of-five series.

=== BC Kalev/Cramo vs. Rakvere Tarvas ===
30 April Game 1	BC Kalev/Cramo	108–100(OT) (Series: 1–0)	Rakvere Tarvas	Tallinn
18:00	Scoring by quarter: 32–22, 14–21, 22–26, 30–29, Overtime: 10–2
	Pts: Lewis 26; Rebs: Thomas 11; Asts: Dorbek 10; PIR: Thomas 32	Report	Pts: Gludītis 30; Rebs: Hayes 11; Asts: Harris 9 PIR: Harris 25	Arena: Kalev Sports Hall; Referees: Mihkel Männiste, Ranno Konks, Rainis Värv

2 May Game 2	Rakvere Tarvas	83–98 (Series: 0–2)	BC Kalev/Cramo	Rakvere
17:00	Scoring by quarter: 23–26, 15–30, 24–24, 21–18
	Pts: Haller 23; Rebs: Hayes, Niits 5 Asts: Harris 8 PIR: Haller 20	Report	Pts: Lewis 28; Rebs: Thomas 8 Asts: Thomas 7 PIR: Lewis 42	Arena: Rakvere Sports Hall; Referees: Rain Peerandi, Tanel Suslov, Janek Saluse

3 May Game 3	BC Kalev/Cramo	91–78 (Series: 3–0)	Rakvere Tarvas	Tallinn
19:00	Scoring by quarter: 24–20, 27–13, 22–21, 18–24
	Pts: Lewis 20; Rebs: Thomas 8 Asts: Dorbek 4 PIR: Thomas 32	Report	Pts: Gludītis 22; Rebs: Harris 6 Asts: Harris 10; PIR: Harris 29	Arena: Kalev Sports Hall; Referees: Aare Halliko, Alex Talisainen, Hendrik Laas

=== Pärnu Sadam vs. AVIS UTILITAS Rapla ===
29 April Game 1	Pärnu Sadam	76–69 (Series: 1–0)	AVIS UTILITAS Rapla	Pärnu
19:00	Scoring by quarter: 17–11, 10–19, 25–19, 24–20
	Pts: Maxhuni 21; Rebs: Kirves 11; Asts: Kangur 6 PIR: Maxhuni 21	Report	Pts: Freimanis 18; Rebs: Doorson, Freimanis 9 Asts: Childress 7 PIR: Freimanis 22	Arena: Pärnu Sports Hall; Referees: Tanel Suslov, Mart Uuehendrik, Hendrik Laas

1 May Game 2	AVIS UTILITAS Rapla	72–79 (Series: 0–2)	Pärnu Sadam	Rapla
17:00	Scoring by quarter: 18–18, 17–21, 14–19, 23–21
	Pts: Childress 24; Rebs: Doorson, Freimanis 8 Asts: T. Kaldre 4 PIR: Childress 35	Report	Pts: Maxhuni, Valge 16; Rebs: Blaus 9 Asts: Kirves 6 PIR: Jaunzems 22	Arena: Sadolin Sports Hall; Referees: Aare Halliko, Ranno Konks, Alex Talisainen

4 May Game 3	Pärnu Sadam	67–60 (Series: 3–0)	AVIS UTILITAS Rapla	Pärnu
19:00	Scoring by quarter: 16–21, 16–15, 15–9, 20–15
	Pts: Maxhuni 14; Rebs: Kirves 9 Asts: Rosenthal 3 PIR: four players 12	Report	Pts: Childress 12; Rebs: Freimanis 13; Asts: Childress 5 PIR: Freimanis 15	Arena: Pärnu Sports Hall; Referees: Rain Peerandi, Mihkel Männiste, Rainis Värv

== Third place games ==
The third place games are best-of-five series.

=== AVIS UTILITAS Rapla vs. Rakvere Tarvas ===
7 May Game 1	AVIS UTILITAS Rapla	73–77 (Series: 0–1)	Rakvere Tarvas	Rapla
18:00	Scoring by quarter: 20–15, 21–21, 12–25, 20–16
	Pts: Sutt 16; Rebs: Aminu 11; Asts: Ilves, T. Kaldre 5 PIR: Sutt 20	Report	Pts: Gludītis 29; Rebs: Hayes 10; Asts: Harris 5 PIR: Gludītis 26	Arena: Sadolin Sports Hall; Referees: Mihkel Männiste, Mart Uuehendrik, Ranno Konks

9 May Game 2	Rakvere Tarvas	73–90 (Series: 1–1)	AVIS UTILITAS Rapla	Rakvere
17:00	Scoring by quarter: 18–17, 16–18, 23–31, 16–24
	Pts: Haller 20; Rebs: Gludītis 6 Asts: Gludītis 8 PIR: Gludītis 19	Report	Pts: Aminu 21; Rebs: Aminu, Freimanis 9 Asts: Aminu 6 PIR: Aminu 36	Arena: Rakvere Sports Hall; Referees: Aare Halliko, Tanel Suslov, Hendrik Laas

11 May Game 3	AVIS UTILITAS Rapla	79–82 (Series: 1–2)	Rakvere Tarvas	Rapla
19:00	Scoring by quarter: 17–23, 23–11, 17–23, 22–25
	Pts: S. Kaldre 18; Rebs: Freimanis 11; Asts: T. Kaldre 7 PIR: Freimanis 21	Report	Pts: Haller 26; Rebs: Niits 9 Asts: Gludītis 7 PIR: Haller 26	Arena: Sadolin Sports Hall; Referees: Rain Peerandi, Mart Uuehendrik, Rainis Värv

13 May Game 4	Rakvere Tarvas	71–74 (Series: 2–2)	AVIS UTILITAS Rapla	Rakvere
19:00	Scoring by quarter: 16–18, 19–23, 17–18, 19–15
	Pts: Lindmets 18; Rebs: Niits 6 Asts: Harris 8 PIR: Harris 26	Report	Pts: Freimanis 16; Rebs: three players 9 Asts: T. Kaldre 5 PIR: Sutt 21	Arena: Rakvere Sports Hall; Referees: Mihkel Männiste, Mart Uuehendrik, Alex Talisainen

14 May Game 5	AVIS UTILITAS Rapla	84–81 (Series: 3–2)	Rakvere Tarvas	Rapla
18:00	Scoring by quarter: 12–19, 26–16, 29–14, 17–32
	Pts: Aminu 18; Rebs: Aminu 10; Asts: Sutt 8 PIR: Aminu 25	Report	Pts: Gludītis 23; Rebs: Harris 10; Asts: Harris 8 PIR: Harris 30	Arena: Sadolin Sports Hall; Referees: Aare Halliko, Tanel Suslov, Mihkel Männiste

== Finals ==
The finals are best-of-five series.

=== BC Kalev/Cramo vs. Pärnu Sadam ===
8 May Game 1	BC Kalev/Cramo	76–81 (Series: 0–1)	Pärnu Sadam	Tallinn
17:00	Scoring by quarter: 20–13, 18–21, 13–19, 25–28
	Pts: Thomas 18; Rebs: Thomas 10; Asts: Keene, Thomas 5 PIR: Thomas 31	Report	Pts: Jaunzems 24; Rebs: Kangur 13; Asts: Maxhuni 10; PIR: Jaunzems 33	Arena: Kalev Sports Hall; Referees: Aare Halliko, Tanel Suslov, Alex Talisainen

12 May Game 2	Pärnu Sadam	80–85 (Series: 1–1)	BC Kalev/Cramo	Pärnu
19:00	Scoring by quarter: 24–22, 14–18, 19–22, 23–23
	Pts: Maxhuni 34; Rebs: Kangur 15; Asts: Maxhuni 5 PIR: Maxhuni 31	Report	Pts: Lewis 23; Rebs: Thomas 14; Asts: Keene 7 PIR: Lewis 23	Arena: Pärnu Sports Hall; Referees: Mihkel Männiste, Ranno Konks, Janek Saluse

15 May Game 3	BC Kalev/Cramo	68–53 (Series: 2–1)	Pärnu Sadam	Tallinn
17:00	Scoring by quarter: 18–12, 26–9, 14–14, 10–18
	Pts: Keene 24; Rebs: Jõesaar 8 Asts: Keene 5 PIR: Keene 29	Report	Pts: Blaus, Suurorg 14; Rebs: Blaus 8 Asts: Maxhuni 4 PIR: Blaus 18	Arena: Kalev Sports Hall; Referees: Aare Halliko, Tanel Suslov, Hendrik Laas

17 May Game 4	Pärnu Sadam	70–96 (Series: 1–3)	BC Kalev/Cramo	Pärnu
19:00	Scoring by quarter: 22–21, 25–32, 12–21, 11–22
	Pts: Maxhuni 26; Rebs: Kangur, Rosenthal 5 Asts: Maxhuni 5 PIR: Maxhuni 30	Report	Pts: Lewis 31; Rebs: Thomas 10; Asts: Keene 8 PIR: Lewis 43	Arena: Pärnu Sports Hall; Referees: Aare Halliko, Rain Peerandi, Rainis Värv
