= 2022–23 Latvian–Estonian Basketball League =

Latvian–Estonian Basketball League
- Season: 2022–23
- Duration: 30 September 2022 – 8 April 2023
- Games played: 254
- Teams: 16
- TV partner(s): Delfi, Inspira, LTV7, Sportacentrs.com, TV4

Finals
- Champions: (Ukraine) BC Prometey
- Runners-up: (Latvia) VEF Rīga
- Third place: (Estonia) Tartu Ülikool Maks & Moorits
- Fourth place: (Estonia) BC Kalev/Cramo
- Finals MVP: (Puerto Rico) Gian Clavell

Statistical leaders
Points	(Croatia) Matej Radunić	21.4
Rebounds	(Latvia) Kristaps Dārgais	9.7
Assists	(Latvia) Renārs Birkāns	7.1

Records
- Biggest home win: BC Prometey 106–50 BC Tarvas (16 October 2022)
- Biggest away win: Valmiera GLASS VIA 58–115 BC Prometey (7 October 2022)
- Winning streak: 19 games BC Prometey
- Losing streak: 12 games BC Tarvas
- Highest attendance: 5,050; VEF Rīga 73–92 BC Prometey (11 February 2023)

The 2022–23 Latvian–Estonian Basketball League, known as the Paf Latvian–Estonian Basketball League for sponsorship reasons, was the fifth season of the Latvian–Estonian Basketball League, the premier basketball competition for men's teams in Latvia and Estonia. Nine Estonian and six Latvian teams were joined by Ukrainian team BC Prometey, who went on to win the league.

== Competition format ==
The regular season consisted of two rounds, followed by the quarter-finals and the Final Four.

== Teams ==
Following the 2022 Russian invasion of Ukraine, teams from Ukraine started looking for opportunities to join leagues abroad. On 17 June 2022, it was announced that the 2020–21 Ukrainian Basketball SuperLeague champions BC Prometey will join Latvian-Estonian Basketball League for the 2022–23 season. The team was to play its home games in Riga.

On 21 July 2022, Keila KK joined the league after finishing third in the second division of the Estonian league system.

16 teams was the highest number of teams participating in the league since its establishment.

=== Venues and locations ===
Location of teams in 2022–23 Latvian–Estonian Basketball League

Team	Home city	Arena	Capacity
(Estonia) AVIS UTILITAS Rapla	Rapla	Sadolin Sports Hall	958
(Estonia) BC Kalev/Cramo	Tallinn	Kalev Sports Hall	1,700
(Estonia) BC Kalev/Cramo	Tallinn	Nord Cramo Sports Hall	980
(Ukraine) BC Prometey	Riga	Rimi Olympic Sports Center	830
(Estonia) BC Tarvas	Rakvere	Rakvere Sports Hall	2,747
(Latvia) BK Liepāja	Liepāja	Liepāja Olympic Center	2,542
(Latvia) BK Ogre	Ogre	Ogre 1st Secondary School	500
(Latvia) BK Ventspils	Ventspils	Ventspils Olympic Center	3,085
(Estonia) Keila KK	Keila	Keila Health Center	800
(Latvia) Latvijas Universitāte	Riga	Rimi Olympic Sports Center	830
(Estonia) Pärnu Sadam	Pärnu	Pärnu Sports Hall	1,820
(Estonia) Tallinna Kalev/Audentes	Tallinn	Audentes Sports Center	1,030
(Estonia) TalTech/OPTIBET	Tallinn	TalTech Sports Hall	1,000
(Estonia) Tartu Ülikool Maks & Moorits	Tartu	University of Tartu Sports Hall	2,600
(Latvia) Valmiera GLASS VIA	Valmiera	Valmiera Olympic Center	1,500
(Latvia) VEF Rīga	Riga	Arena Riga	11,200
(Latvia) VEF Rīga	Riga	Rimi Olympic Sports Center	830
(Estonia) Viimsi/Sportland	Haabneeme	Forus Sports Center	500

=== Personnel and sponsorship ===
Team	Head coach	Captain	Kit manufacturer	Shirt sponsor
(Estonia) AVIS UTILITAS Rapla	(Croatia) Arnel Dedić	(Estonia) Sven Kaldre	Spalding	Hepa
(Estonia) BC Kalev/Cramo	(Estonia) Heiko Rannula	(Estonia) Martin Dorbek	Nike	Unibet
(Ukraine) BC Prometey	(Czech Republic) Ronen Ginzburg	(Ukraine) Denys Lukashov	Nike	Budinvest
(Estonia) BC Tarvas	(Estonia) Vaido Rego	(Estonia) Renato Lindmets	Spalding	Spadematron
(Latvia) BK Liepāja	(Latvia) Artūrs Visockis-Rubenis	(Latvia) Renārs Birkāns	Nike	Cleanr Grupa
(Latvia) BK Ogre	(Latvia) Uldis Švēde	(Latvia) Kristaps Dārgais	Nike	Ogre
(Latvia) BK Ventspils	(Latvia) Gints Fogels	(Latvia) Andrejs Šeļakovs	Joma	Ventspils
(Estonia) Keila KK	(Estonia) Peep Pahv	(Latvia) Mārcis Vītols	Nike	Utilitas
(Latvia) Latvijas Universitāte	(Latvia) Gunārs Gailītis	(Latvia) Edvards Mežulis	Nike	University of Latvia
(Estonia) Pärnu Sadam	(Estonia) Gert Kullamäe	(Estonia) Mihkel Kirves	Nike	Betsafe
(Estonia) Tallinna Kalev/Audentes	(Estonia) Rauno Pehka	(Estonia) Kristjan Kangur	Spalding	Tallinn
(Estonia) TalTech/Optibet	(Estonia) Alar Varrak	(Estonia) Erik Keedus	Nike	Optibet
(Estonia) Tartu Ülikool Maks & Moorits	(Latvia) Nikolajs Mazurs	(Estonia) Märt Rosenthal	Spalding	Maks & Moorits
(Latvia) Valmiera GLASS VIA	(Latvia) Oskars Virsis	(Latvia) Valters Vēveris	Spalding	Valmiera Glass
(Latvia) VEF Rīga	(Latvia) Jānis Gailītis	(Latvia) Artis Ate		Balta
(Estonia) Viimsi/Sportland	(Estonia) Valdo Lips	(Estonia) Karl Johan Lips	Nike	Sportland

== Regular season ==
=== League table ===
Pos	Team	Pld	W	L	PF	PA	PD	PCT	Qualification
1	(Ukraine) BC Prometey	30	29	1	2860	2154	+706	.967	Qualification to playoffs
2	(Estonia) BC Kalev/Cramo	30	25	5	2622	2191	+431	.833	Qualification to playoffs
3	(Latvia) VEF Rīga	30	24	6	2520	2084	+436	.800	Qualification to playoffs
4	(Estonia) Tartu Ülikool Maks & Moorits	30	20	10	2447	2278	+169	.667	Qualification to playoffs
5	(Latvia) BK Ventspils	30	19	11	2601	2427	+174	.633	Qualification to playoffs
6	(Estonia) AVIS UTILITAS Rapla	30	18	12	2364	2238	+126	.600	Qualification to playoffs
7	(Latvia) BK Ogre	30	17	13	2371	2324	+47	.567	Qualification to playoffs
8	(Estonia) Viimsi/Sportland	30	15	15	2423	2455	−32	.500	Qualification to playoffs
9	(Estonia) TalTech/OPTIBET	30	12	18	2342	2414	−72	.400	
10	(Latvia) BK Liepāja	30	12	18	2348	2541	−193	.400	
11	(Estonia) Pärnu Sadam	30	12	18	2364	2383	−19	.400	
12	(Estonia) Keila KK	30	11	19	2368	2631	−263	.367	
13	(Latvia) Latvijas Universitāte	30	10	20	2184	2308	−124	.333	
14	(Estonia) Tallinna Kalev/Audentes	30	7	23	2297	2447	−150	.233	
15	(Latvia) Valmiera GLASS VIA	30	6	24	2209	2787	−578	.200	
16	(Estonia) BC Tarvas	30	3	27	2180	2838	−658	.100	

Source: estlatbl.com

=== Results ===
Home \ Away	RAP	KAL	BCP	TRV	BKL	OGR	BKV	KEI	LAT	PAR	TLK	TCH	TRT	VIA	VEF	VMS
AVIS UTILITAS Rapla	—	67–79	73–95	98–64	75–71	81–71	78–87	67–59	77–62	73–76	74–63	83–70	71–78	96–64	71–74	103–84
BC Kalev/Cramo	77–83	—	94–80	111–65	90–94	99–68	91–72	83–56	77–68	81–70	101–64	105–69	75–71	101–73	78–66	87–74
BC Prometey	89–81	83–79	—	106–50	96–91	109–56	101–94	107–68	94–76	94–59	94–65	89–67	101–64	104–75	81–71	107–72
BC Tarvas	59–102	73–85	66–95	—	96–90	81–75	69–88	85–102	76–78	84–114	83–106	72–88	87–99	102–83	71–97	77–80
BK Liepāja	69–71	92–93	67–88	70–69	—	68–99	72–60	89–84	88–91	102–98	86–83	77–76	65–84	83–69	98–93	97–79
BK Ogre	92–75	78–100	79–86	93–66	81–68	—	88–94	97–76	85–71	81–68	72–68	80–64	75–86	88–55	80–90	88–74
BK Ventspils	82–74	76–86	83–90	98–59	102–55	78–79	—	93–86	83–71	91–84	90–76	84–71	84–99	108–63	99–92	100–90
Keila KK	71–85	66–108	69–117	96–71	75–85	81–87	75–86	—	78–80	90–92	103–100	87–71	80–75	104–96	76–88	91–87
Latvijas Universitāte	61–66	66–73	57–83	99–56	86–78	61–63	70–78	89–84	—	73–59	87–82	53–73	59–81	100–60	56–79	64–82
Pärnu Sadam	66–81	78–83	71–77	103–80	90–58	85–71	81–75	89–66	81–65	—	77–93	78–83	86–91	72–60	63–71	87–86
Tallinna Kalev/Audentes	90–73	68–78	74–83	92–59	81–83	56–63	92–96	78–82	76–75	62–97	—	79–62	72–78	76–87	61–67	81–92
TalTech/OPTIBET	83–89	84–102	82–115	107–86	84–58	79–80	91–84	85–62	84–67	85–79	78–83	—	69–81	87–60	60–73	91–77
Tartu Ülikool Maks & Moorits	73–51	67–73	73–91	98–76	89–62	65–80	65–78	69–89	82–68	79–68	72–70	83–53	—	110–79	70–77	106–86
Valmiera GLASS VIA	76–107	56–96	58–115	87–79	86–89	87–85	98–86	88–94	72–88	83–82	91–77	72–102	88–95	—	60–102	71–83
VEF Rīga	81–62	91–67	73–92	104–47	81–76	75–67	100–81	95–48	82–70	85–41	93–60	75–69	89–77	89–53	—	65–72
Viimsi/Sportland	72–77	73–70	67–98	94–72	82–67	78–70	81–91	89–60	76–73	80–70	71–69	101–75	76–87	87–59	78–102	—

Source: estlatbl.com
Legend: Blue = home team win; Red = away team win.
Matches with lighter background shading were decided after overtime.

== Playoffs ==
Playoffs started on 24 March 2023. On 9 March, it was announced that the Final Four tournament will take place in Tallinn on 7 and 8 April.

=== Quarterfinals ===
Team 1	Agg.	Team 2	1st leg	2nd leg	3rd leg
BC Prometey (Ukraine)	2–1	(Estonia) Viimsi/Sportland	91–69	105–107	59–57
BC Kalev/Cramo (Estonia)	2–0	(Latvia) BK Ogre	76–70	83–66	
VEF Rīga (Latvia)	2–0	(Estonia) AVIS UTILITAS Rapla	77–54	94–89	
Tartu Ülikool Maks & Moorits (Estonia)	2–1	(Latvia) BK Ventspils	80–90	88–79	92–69

==== BC Prometey vs. Viimsi/Sportland ====
25 March 2023	BC Prometey (Ukraine)	91–69 (Series: 1–0)	(Estonia) Viimsi/Sportland	Riga
17:00 (GMT)	Scoring by quarter: 30–16, 18–20, 21–18, 22–15
	Pts: Sydorov 15; Rebs: Lypovyy 9 Asts: Agada 6	Box Score	Pts: Harris 19; Rebs: Harris 8 Asts: Harris, Post 6	Arena: Rimi Olympic Center; Attendance: 168; Referees: K. Konstantinovs, H. Laas, E. Tiidor

1 April 2023	Viimsi/Sportland (Estonia)	107–105(OT) (Series: 1–1)	(Ukraine) BC Prometey	Haabneeme
17:00 (GMT)	Scoring by quarter: 27–25, 21–18, 24–23, 16–22, Overtime: 19–17
	Pts: Lips 24; Rebs: Toppin 14; Asts: Harris 9	Box Score	Pts: Clavell 33; Rebs: Balvín 17; Asts: Clavell 10	Arena: Forus Sports Center; Attendance: 593; Referees: A. Halliko, M. Rozenfelds, R. Misirovs

3 April 2023	BC Prometey (Ukraine)	59–57 (Series: 2–1)	(Estonia) Viimsi/Sportland	Riga
18:30 (GMT)	Scoring by quarter: 17–10, 10-20, 14-18, 18-9
	Pts: Balvín 18; Rebs: Balvín 12; Asts: Clavell 4	Box Score	Pts: Lips 15; Rebs: Harris 9 Asts: Harris 5	Arena: Rimi Olympic Center; Attendance: 129; Referees: O. Lucis, M. Männiste, R. Värv

==== BC Kalev/Cramo vs. BK Ogre ====
24 March 2023	BC Kalev/Cramo (Estonia)	76–70 (Series: 1–0)	(Latvia) BK Ogre	Tallinn
19:00 (GMT)	Scoring by quarter: 19–16, 18–21, 24–10, 15–23
	Pts: Toom 25; Rebs: Toom 8 Asts: Gilbert 4	Box Score	Pts: Lasenbergs 17; Rebs: Dārgais 13; Asts: Lasenbergs 6	Arena: Kalev Sports Hall; Attendance: 374; Referees: R. Peerandi, E. Tukišs, J. Brūveris

1 April 2023	BK Ogre (Latvia)	66–83 (Series: 0–2)	(Estonia) BC Kalev/Cramo	Ogre
17:00 (GMT)	Scoring by quarter: 15–27, 26–24, 13–18, 12–24
	Pts: Talton 19; Rebs: Dārgais 9 Asts: Talton 8	Box Score	Pts: Hermet 23; Rebs: Kurbas, Toom 5 Asts: Dorbek, Van Beck 6	Arena: Ogre 1st Secondary School; Referees: O. Lucis, M. Männiste, R. Värv

==== VEF Rīga vs. AVIS UTILITAS Rapla ====
24 March 2023	VEF Rīga (Latvia)	77–54 (Series: 1–0)	(Estonia) AVIS UTILITAS Rapla	Riga
19:30 (GMT)	Scoring by quarter: 26–9, 13–13, 23–18, 15–14
	Pts: Clarence 14; Rebs: Brooks 9 Asts: Cosey 4	Box Score	Pts: Cheese 21; Rebs: Cheese 9 Asts: Kaldre, Laane 3	Arena: Rimi Olympic Center; Attendance: 800; Referees: A. Aunkrogers, R. Värv, R. Kobin

28 March 2023	AVIS UTILITAS Rapla (Estonia)	89–94 (Series: 0–2)	(Latvia) VEF Rīga	Rapla
19:00 (GMT)	Scoring by quarter: 14–30, 23–17, 26–19, 26–28
	Pts: Laane 23; Rebs: Niits 7 Asts: Laane 8	Box Score	Pts: Gulbis, Zoriks 19; Rebs: Brooks 7 Asts: Zoriks 7	Arena: Sadolin Sports Hall; Attendance: 413; Referees: M. Uuehendrik, J. Rozenbergs, E. Kājiņš

==== Tartu Ülikool Maks & Moorits vs. BK Ventspils ====
24 March 2023	Tartu Ülikool Maks & Moorits (Estonia)	80–90 (Series: 0–1)	(Latvia) BK Ventspils	Tartu
19:00 (GMT)	Scoring by quarter: 20–25, 19–22, 22–25, 19–18
	Pts: Rosenthal 24; Rebs: Pavelka 14; Asts: Rosenthal 4	Box Score	Pts: Ausējs 27; Rebs: Wembi 10; Asts: Jaunzems 7	Arena: University of Tartu Sports Hall; Attendance: 1,028; Referees: G. Saliņš, R. Konks, R. Helmšteins

29 March 2023	BK Ventspils (Latvia)	79–88 (Series: 1–1)	(Estonia) Tartu Ülikool Maks & Moorits	Ventspils
19:00 (GMT)	Scoring by quarter: 23–24, 20–26, 15–15, 21–23
	Pts: Sīpoliņš 19; Rebs: Sīpoliņš 14; Asts: Jaunzems 5	Box Score	Pts: Voinalovych 21; Rebs: three players 5 Asts: Rosenthal 5	Arena: Ventspils Olympic Center; Attendance: 1,050; Referees: O. Lucis, R. Värv, H. Laas

1 April 2023	Tartu Ülikool Maks & Moorits (Estonia)	92–69 (Series: 2–1)	(Latvia) BK Ventspils	Tartu
17:00 (GMT)	Scoring by quarter: 31–25, 13–12, 17–17, 31–17
	Pts: Gordon 23; Rebs: Pavelka 16; Asts: Böckler 7	Box Score	Pts: Sīpoliņš 15; Rebs: Jaunzems, Gandia-Rosa 7 Asts: Jaunzems, Gandia-Rosa 3	Arena: University of Tartu Sports Hall; Attendance: 1,341; Referees: R. Peerandi, A. Aunkrogers, E. Tukišs

== Final Four ==
Final Four was held from 7 to 8 April at Unibet Arena in Tallinn, Estonia.

Semifinals
1	(Ukraine) BC Prometey	89
4	(Estonia) Tartu Ülikool Maks & Moorits	67
2	(Estonia) BC Kalev/Cramo	65
3	(Latvia) VEF Rīga	83

Final
1	(Ukraine) BC Prometey	77
3	(Latvia) VEF Rīga	62
Third place
4	(Estonia) Tartu Ülikool Maks & Moorits	63
2	(Estonia) BC Kalev/Cramo	60

=== Semifinals ===
7 April 2023	BC Prometey (Ukraine)	89–69	(Estonia) Tartu Ülikool Maks & Moorits	Tallinn
16:00 (GMT)	Scoring by quarter: 18–12, 27–11, 22–18, 22–26
	Pts: Sydorov 20; Rebs: Balvín 13; Asts: Balvín 5	Box Score	Pts: Gordon 24; Rebs: Pavelka 9 Asts: Suurorg 5	Arena: Unibet Arena; Attendance: 631; Referees: K. Konstantinovs, M. Kozlovskis, M. Männiste

7 April 2023	BC Kalev/Cramo (Estonia)	65–83	(Latvia) VEF Rīga	Tallinn
19:00 (GMT)	Scoring by quarter: 11–14, 22–20, 13–25, 19–24
	Pts: Kovliar 18; Rebs: Konontšuk 7 Asts: Van Beck 3	Box Score	Pts: Clarance 25; Rebs: Brooks 10; Asts: three players 3	Arena: Unibet Arena; Attendance: 1,246; Referees: A. Halliko, O. Lucis, H. Laas

=== Third place game ===
8 April 2023	Tartu Ülikool Maks & Moorits (Estonia)	63–60	(Estonia) BC Kalev/Cramo	Tallinn
14:00 (GMT)	Scoring by quarter: 14–8, 20–16, 10–21, 19–15
	Pts: Gordon 26; Rebs: Eelmäe 12; Asts: Gordon 5	Box Score	Pts: Meiers 20; Rebs: Kitsing 13; Asts: Kovliar 5	Arena: Unibet Arena; Attendance: 707; Referees: M. Kozlovskis, K. Konstantinovs, H. Laas

=== Final ===
8 April 2023	BC Prometey (Ukraine)	77–62	(Latvia) VEF Rīga	Tallinn
17:00 (GMT)	Scoring by quarter: 20–21, 24–16, 22–14, 11–11
	Pts: Clavell 21; Rebs: Balvín 10; Asts: Sanon 7	Box Score	Pts: Zoriks 21; Rebs: three players 5 Asts: Zoriks 3	Arena: Unibet Arena; Attendance: 423; Referees: A. Halliko, O. Lucis, M. Männiste

== Statistics ==
As of 9 April 2023.

=== Points ===
Rank	Name	Team	PPG
1.	(Croatia) Matej Radunić	(Estonia) Keila KK	21.4
2.	(United States) Ty Gordon	(Estonia) Tartu Ülikool Maks & Moorits	19.8
3.	(United States) Malik Toppin	(Estonia) Viimsi/Sportland	18.5
4.	(United States) Tervell Beck	(Latvia) Valmiera GLASS VIA	18.3
5.	(Latvia) Kārlis Šiliņš	(Latvia) BK Liepāja	18.0

=== Rebounds ===
Rank	Name	Team	RPG
1.	(Latvia) Kristaps Dārgais	(Latvia) BK Ogre	9.7
2.	(Slovakia) Tomáš Pavelka	(Estonia) Tartu Ülikool Maks & Moorits	9.4
3.	(Estonia) Kristjan Kangur	(Estonia) Tallinna Kalev/Audentes	9.3
4.	(Lithuania) Rokas Gadiliauskas	(Estonia) Tallinna Kalev/Audentes	9.0
5.	(Latvia) Kārlis Šiliņš	(Latvia) BK Liepāja	8.7

=== Assists ===
Rank	Name	Team	APG
1.	(Latvia) Renārs Birkāns	(Latvia) BK Liepāja	7.1
2.	(Estonia) Rait-Riivo Laane	(Estonia) AVIS UTILITAS Rapla	6.3
3.	(Estonia) Märt Rosenthal	(Estonia) Tartu Ülikool Maks & Moorits	6.1
4.	(United States) Devin Harris	(Estonia) Viimsi/Sportland	6.0
5.	(Estonia) Siim-Markus Post	(Estonia) Viimsi/Sportland	5.9

== Awards ==
=== MVP of the Month ===
Month	Player	Team	Ref.
2022
October	(Latvia) Kārlis Šiliņš	(Latvia) BK Liepāja	
November	(Ukraine) Andrii Voinalovych	(Estonia) Tartu Ülikool Maks & Moorits	
December	(Lithuania) Tadas Pažėra	(Estonia) Pärnu Sadam	
2023
January	(Latvia) Kārlis Šiliņš	(Latvia) BK Liepāja	
February	(Croatia) Matej Radunic	(Estonia) Keila KK	

=== Final Four MVP ===
(Puerto Rico) Gian Clavell ( (Ukraine) BC Prometey)

=== All-Final Four Team ===
- (Puerto Rico) Gian Clavell ( (Ukraine) BC Prometey)
- (Latvia) Kristers Zoriks ( (Latvia) VEF Rīga)
- (United States) Ty Gordon ( (Estonia) Tartu Ülikool Maks & Moorits)
- (Ukraine) Oleksandr Kovliar ( (Estonia) BC Kalev/Cramo)
- (Czech Republic) Ondřej Balvín ( (Ukraine) BC Prometey)

== Clubs in European competitions ==
Team	Competition	Progress
(Ukraine) BC Prometey	EuroCup	Semifinals
(Latvia) VEF Rīga	Champions League	Regular season
(Estonia) Pärnu Sadam	Champions League	Qualifying rounds
(Estonia) Pärnu Sadam	FIBA Europe Cup	Regular season
(Estonia) BC Kalev/Cramo	FIBA Europe Cup	Semifinals
