= 2019 KML Playoffs =

Estonian national championships in basketball

KML Play-offs
- Season: 2019
- Dates: 9 April – 22 May 2019
- Games played: 20
- Teams: 6

Finals
- Champions: BC Kalev/Cramo (11th title)
- Runners-up: Tallinna Kalev/TLÜ
- Third place: Pärnu Sadam
- Fourth place: TalTech
- Finals MVP: (Bulgaria) Branko Mirković

The 2019 KML Play-offs was the tournament to determine the Korvpalli Meistriliiga champions for the 2018–19 season. This season saw the introduction of the Estonian-Latvian Basketball League, replacing the KML regular season, with the top six Estonian teams advancing to the KML play-offs. The play-offs began on 9 April and concluded on 22 May with BC Kalev/Cramo defeating Tallinna Kalev/TLÜ 3 games to 0 in the finals to win their 11th Estonian Championship.

== Teams ==
=== Venues and locations ===
Locations of the 2019 KML Play-offs teams

Team	Home city	Arena	Capacity
AVIS UTILITAS Rapla	Rapla	Sadolin Sports Hall	818
BC Kalev/Cramo	Tallinn	Kalev Sports Hall	1,700
Pärnu Sadam	Pärnu	Pärnu Sports Hall	1,820
Tallinna Kalev/TLÜ	Tallinn	Sõle Sports Centre	153
TalTech	Tallinn	TalTech Sports Hall	1,000
Tartu Ülikool	Tartu	University of Tartu Sports Hall	2,600

=== Personnel and sponsorship ===
Team	Head coach	Captain	Kit manufacturer	Shirt sponsor
AVIS UTILITAS Rapla	(Estonia) Toomas Annuk	(Estonia) Indrek Kajupank	Spalding	Fenikss Casino
BC Kalev/Cramo	(Lithuania) Donaldas Kairys	(Estonia) Kristjan Kangur	Nike	Cramo
Pärnu Sadam	(Estonia) Heiko Rannula	(Estonia) Rannar Raap	Nike	Port of Pärnu
Tallinna Kalev/TLÜ	(Estonia) Martin Müürsepp	(Estonia) Mario Paiste	Nike	City of Tallinn
TalTech	(Estonia) Rait Käbin	(Estonia) Jaan Puidet	Nike	Tallinn University of Technology
Tartu Ülikool	(Estonia) Priit Vene	(Lithuania) Julius Kazakauskas	Nike	University of Tartu

== Play-off bracket ==
Quarter-finals
4	AVIS UTILITAS Rapla	1
5	Pärnu Sadam	3
3	Tartu Ülikool	1
6	Tallinna Kalev/TLÜ	3

Semi-finals
1	BC Kalev/Cramo	3
5	Pärnu Sadam	0
2	TalTech	0
6	Tallinna Kalev/TLÜ	3

Finals
1	BC Kalev/Cramo	3
6	Tallinna Kalev/TLÜ	0
Third place
2	TalTech	0
5	Pärnu Sadam	3

== Quarter-finals ==
The quarter-finals are best-of-five series.

=== Tartu Ülikool vs. Tallinna Kalev/TLÜ ===
9 April	Tartu Ülikool	78–73 (Series: 1–0)	Tallinna Kalev/TLÜ	Tartu
19:00	Scoring by quarter: 17–17, 19–23, 17–20, 25–13
	Pts: Velička 32; Rebs: Kazakauskas 10; Asts: Velička 6 PIR: Velička 42	Boxscore	Pts: Nofflet 25; Rebs: Buchanan 18; Asts: Nofflet 5 PIR: Buchanan 35	Arena: University of Tartu Sports Hall; Attendance: 450; Referees: Tanel Suslov, Rain Peerandi, Janek Saluse

13 April	Tallinna Kalev/TLÜ	87–70 (Series: 1–1)	Tartu Ülikool	Tallinn
16:00	Scoring by quarter: 14–16, 26–15, 22–17, 25–22
	Pts: McGhee 25; Rebs: Buchanan 11; Asts: Buchanan, McGhee 3 PIR: McGhee 33	Boxscore	Pts: Hermet 17; Rebs: Hermet, Kazakauskas 6 Asts: Velička 7 PIR: Hermet 17	Arena: Sõle Sports Centre; Attendance: 160; Referees: Mihkel Männiste, Ranno Konks, Alex Talisainen

17 April	Tartu Ülikool	77–83 (Series: 1–2)	Tallinna Kalev/TLÜ	Tartu
19:00	Scoring by quarter: 23–20, 18–19, 13–25, 23–19
	Pts: Kazakauskas 30; Rebs: Kazakauskas 9 Asts: Velička 13; PIR: Kazakauskas 39	Boxscore	Pts: Lips 20; Rebs: Buchanan 8 Asts: McGhee 6 PIR: Harrison 15	Arena: University of Tartu Sports Hall; Attendance: 400; Referees: Rain Peerandi, Janek Saluse, Jegor Mitrofanski

19 April	Tallinna Kalev/TLÜ	97–96(OT) (Series: 3–1)	Tartu Ülikool	Viimsi
17:00	Scoring by quarter: 16–24, 23–21, 27–17, 18–22, Overtime: 13–12
	Pts: Harrison 23; Rebs: Buchanan 13; Asts: McGhee 6 PIR: Buchanan 30	Boxscore	Pts: Velička 29; Rebs: Kazakauskas 7 Asts: Velička 7 PIR: Velička 36	Arena: Karulaugu Sports Centre; Attendance: 200; Referees: Tanel Suslov, Ranno Konks, Alex Talisainen

=== AVIS UTILITAS Rapla vs. Pärnu Sadam ===
10 April	AVIS UTILITAS Rapla	60–83 (Series: 0–1)	Pärnu Sadam	Rapla
19:00	Scoring by quarter: 20–8, 12–21, 15–23, 13–31
	Pts: Kaldre, Williams 16; Rebs: Mickelson 13; Asts: Kaldre 4 PIR: Kaldre 18	Boxscore	Pts: Kirves 15; Rebs: Alston 10; Asts: Raap 7 PIR: Raap 17	Arena: Sadolin Sports Hall; Referees: Aare Halliko, Mihkel Männiste, Alex Talisainen

14 April	Pärnu Sadam	82–57 (Series: 2–0)	AVIS UTILITAS Rapla	Pärnu
17:00	Scoring by quarter: 15–14, 24–18, 21–9, 22–16
	Pts: Rivers 21; Rebs: Alston, Kirves 10; Asts: Post 5 PIR: Kirves 23	Boxscore	Pts: Mickelson 13; Rebs: Jonāts, Kajupank 6 Asts: Ilves 4 PIR: Kaldre 14	Arena: Pärnu Sports Hall; Referees: Tanel Suslov, Ranno Konks, Jegor Mitrofanski

16 April	AVIS UTILITAS Rapla	82–80 (Series: 1–2)	Pärnu Sadam	Rapla
19:00	Scoring by quarter: 21–20, 15–24, 15–19, 31–17
	Pts: Kaldre 21; Rebs: Jonāts 11; Asts: Ilves 8 PIR: Jonāts 27	Boxscore	Pts: Alston, Kirves 18; Rebs: Wade-Chatman 6 Asts: Post, Wade-Chatman 9 PIR: Kirves 22	Arena: Sadolin Sports Hall; Referees: Rain Peerandi, Janek Saluse, Alex Talisainen

20 April	Pärnu Sadam	88–76 (Series: 3–1)	AVIS UTILITAS Rapla	Pärnu
17:00	Scoring by quarter: 28–21, 19–19, 21–17, 20–19
	Pts: Kirves 26; Rebs: Kirves 8 Asts: Post 9 PIR: Kirves 36	Boxscore	Pts: Williams 19; Rebs: Hawkins 6 Asts: Kaldre 5 PIR: Williams 18	Arena: Pärnu Sports Hall; Attendance: 700; Referees: Tanel Suslov, Jegor Mitrofanski, Ranno Konks

== Semi-finals ==
The semi-finals are best-of-five series.

=== BC Kalev/Cramo vs. Pärnu Sadam ===
26 April	BC Kalev/Cramo	91–85 (Series: 1–0)	Pärnu Sadam	Tallinn
19:00	Scoring by quarter: 19–21, 21–20, 30–13, 21–31
	Pts: Moultrie 30; Rebs: Kangur 8 Asts: Wroten 8 PIR: Moultrie 36	Boxscore	Pts: Wade-Chatman 31; Rebs: Alston 10; Asts: Post 5 PIR: Wade-Chatman 29	Arena: Kalev Sports Hall; Attendance: 350; Referees: Aare Halliko, Mihkel Männiste, Alex Talisainen

29 April	Pärnu Sadam	62–102 (Series: 0–2)	BC Kalev/Cramo	Pärnu
19:00	Scoring by quarter: 17–22, 18–25, 15–27, 12–28
	Pts: Rivers 21; Rebs: three players 5 Asts: Kirves, Raap 4 PIR: Kirves 24	Boxscore	Pts: Lewis 18; Rebs: Salash 8 Asts: Wroten 8 PIR: Wroten 22	Arena: Pärnu Sports Hall; Attendance: 530; Referees: Rain Peerandi, Tanel Suslov, Janek Saluse

30 April	BC Kalev/Cramo	89–72 (Series: 3–0)	Pärnu Sadam	Tallinn
17:30	Scoring by quarter: 23–17, 21–17, 30–16, 15–22
	Pts: Lynch 17; Rebs: Moultrie 9 Asts: Wroten 9 PIR: Lynch 24	Boxscore	Pts: Wade-Chatman 14; Rebs: Kirves 8 Asts: three players 3 PIR: Wade-Chatman 15	Arena: Kalev Sports Hall; Attendance: 232; Referees: Aare Halliko, Mart Uuehendrik, Ranno Konks

=== TalTech vs. Tallinna Kalev/TLÜ ===
25 April	TalTech	75–78 (Series: 0–1)	Tallinna Kalev/TLÜ	Tallinn
19:00	Scoring by quarter: 21–15, 16–17, 20–23, 18–23
	Pts: Metsalu, Puidet 16; Rebs: Puidet 7 Asts: Käbin, Puidet 7 PIR: Puidet 21	Boxscore	Pts: Harrison 24; Rebs: Talts 7 Asts: Lips 4 PIR: Harrison 26	Arena: TalTech Sports Hall; Attendance: 640; Referees: Rain Peerandi, Mart Uuehendrik, Janek Saluse

27 April	Tallinna Kalev/TLÜ	94–86 (Series: 2–0)	TalTech	Tallinn
17:00	Scoring by quarter: 22–18, 24–23, 17–24, 31–21
	Pts: McGhee 27; Rebs: three players 6 Asts: three players 3 PIR: McGhee 30	Boxscore	Pts: Metsalu 19; Rebs: Giese 7 Asts: Käbin, Puidet 4 PIR: Raadik 16	Arena: Nord Cramo Sports Hall; Attendance: 225; Referees: Aare Halliko, Mihkel Männiste, Ranno Konks

30 April	TalTech	92–97 (Series: 0–3)	Tallinna Kalev/TLÜ	Tallinn
19:00	Scoring by quarter: 27–29, 21–22, 32–17, 12–29
	Pts: Arbet, Puidet 18; Rebs: Giese, Puidet 9 Asts: Käbin 9 PIR: Puidet 19	Boxscore	Pts: McGhee 25; Rebs: Buchanan 9 Asts: McGhee, Talts 3 PIR: Buchanan 33	Arena: TalTech Sports Hall; Attendance: 612; Referees: Rain Peerandi, Mihkel Männiste, Jegor Mitrofanski

== Third place games ==
The third place games are best-of-five series.

=== TalTech vs. Pärnu Sadam ===
5 May	TalTech	68–75 (Series: 0–1)	Pärnu Sadam	Tallinn
17:00	Scoring by quarter: 20–16, 11–17, 20–21, 17–21
	Pts: Giese 16; Rebs: Raadik 9 Asts: Käbin 3 PIR: Giese 17	Boxscore	Pts: Rivers 21; Rebs: Kirves 11; Asts: Sutt, Wade-Chatman 4 PIR: Rivers 29	Arena: TalTech Sports Hall; Attendance: 485; Referees: Tanel Suslov, Mart Uuehendrik, Ranno Konks

8 May	Pärnu Sadam	79–73(OT) (Series: 2–0)	TalTech	Pärnu
19:00	Scoring by quarter: 13–11, 18–22, 13–15, 22–18, Overtime: 13–7
	Pts: Wade-Chatman 17; Rebs: Alston 11; Asts: Wade-Chatman 7 PIR: Wade-Chatman 26	Boxscore	Pts: Schmalz 26; Rebs: Giese 9 Asts: Schmalz 3 PIR: Schmalz 26	Arena: Pärnu Sports Hall; Attendance: 700; Referees: Tanel Suslov, Mihkel Männiste, Alex Talisainen

10 May	TalTech	63–89 (Series: 0–3)	Pärnu Sadam	Tallinn
19:00	Scoring by quarter: 19–23, 20–17, 19–22, 5–27
	Pts: Viilup 17; Rebs: Giese 8 Asts: Käbin 4 PIR: Giese 19	Boxscore	Pts: Kirves 24; Rebs: Kirves 11; Asts: Sutt, Wade-Chatman 8 PIR: Kirves 33	Arena: TalTech Sports Hall; Attendance: 490; Referees: Mihkel Männiste, Mart Uuehendrik, Janek Saluse

== Finals ==
The finals are best-of-five series.

=== BC Kalev/Cramo vs. Tallinna Kalev/TLÜ ===
16 May	BC Kalev/Cramo	87–78 (Series: 1–0)	Tallinna Kalev/TLÜ	Tallinn
19:00	Scoring by quarter: 20–23, 16–18, 25–17, 26–20
	Pts: Lewis 21; Rebs: Moultrie 7 Asts: Mirković 6 PIR: Moultrie 23	Boxscore	Pts: Harrison 21; Rebs: Buchanan 13; Asts: Harrison 4 PIR: Buchanan 23	Arena: Kalev Sports Hall; Attendance: 600; Referees: Aare Halliko, Mihkel Männiste, Jegor Mitrofanski

20 May	Tallinna Kalev/TLÜ	73–101 (Series: 0–2)	BC Kalev/Cramo	Tallinn
19:00	Scoring by quarter: 14–27, 19–29, 22–22, 18–23
	Pts: three players 13; Rebs: Buchanan 8 Asts: Buchanan 3 PIR: Buchanan 20	Boxscore	Pts: Mirković 16; Rebs: Lynch 5 Asts: Lewis 8 PIR: Mirković 25	Arena: Kalev Sports Hall; Attendance: 450; Referees: Rain Peerandi, Alex Talisainen

22 May	BC Kalev/Cramo	105–83 (Series: 3–0)	Tallinna Kalev/TLÜ	Tallinn
19:00	Scoring by quarter: 32–28, 32–10, 20–25, 21–20
	Pts: Kitsing, Mirković 20; Rebs: Lynch 11; Asts: Lewis 8 PIR: Lewis, Mirković 24	Boxscore	Pts: Harrison 19; Rebs: Buchanan 11; Asts: Loik, Talts 3 PIR: Saks 19	Arena: Kalev Sports Hall; Attendance: 770; Referees: Mart Uuehendrik, Ranno Konks, Janek Saluse

== Awards ==
=== Finals Most Valuable Player ===
- (Bulgaria) Branko Mirković (BC Kalev/Cramo)

=== Best Young Player ===
- (Lithuania) Arnas Velička (Tartu Ülikool)

=== Best Defender ===
- (Estonia) Mihkel Kirves (Pärnu Sadam)

=== Newcomer of the Year ===
- (Estonia) Martin Müürsepp (Tallinna Kalev/TLÜ)

=== Coach of the Year ===
- (Lithuania) Donaldas Kairys (BC Kalev/Cramo)

=== All-Star Five ===
Pos	Player	Team
PG	(United States) Chavaughn Lewis	BC Kalev/Cramo
SG	(United States) Damarcus Harrison	Tallinna Kalev/TLÜ
SF	(United States) Demetre Rivers	Pärnu Sadam
PF	(Estonia) Toomas Raadik	TalTech
C	(United States) Arnett Moultrie	BC Kalev/Cramo
