= 2023 KML Playoffs =

Estonian national championships in basketball

PAF Korvpalli Meistriliiga^{1}
- Season: 2022–23
- Duration: 12 April – 27 May 2023
- Teams: 8

Finals
- Champions: BC Kalev/Cramo (13th title)
- Runners-up: Tartu Ülikool Maks & Moorits
- Third place: Pärnu Sadam
- Fourth place: Viimsi/Sportland
- Finals MVP: (Ukraine) Oleksandr Kovliar

Statistical leaders
Points	(United States) Ty Gordon	19.0
Rebounds	(Estonia) Mihkel Kirves	10.2
Assists	(Estonia) Rait-Riivo Laane	7.0
- ^{1} Sponsored league name, referring to PAF.

The 2023 KML Playoffs was the postseason tournament held to determine the 2022–23 champions of the Korvpalli Meistriliiga (KML). The playoffs began on 12 April 2023 and ended on 27 May with BC Kalev/Cramo defeating Tartu Ülikool Maks & Moorits in the finals.

== Qualified teams ==
The club rankings were determined by the results of the 2022–23 Estonian-Latvian Basketball League regular season.

Pos	Team	Pld	W	L	PF	PA	PD	PCT	Qualification
1	BC Kalev/Cramo	30	25	5	2622	2191	+431	.833	Qualification to playoffs
2	Tartu Ülikool Maks & Moorits	30	20	10	2447	2278	+169	.667	Qualification to playoffs
3	AVIS UTILITAS Rapla	30	18	12	2364	2238	+126	.600	Qualification to playoffs
4	Viimsi/Sportland	30	15	15	2423	2455	−32	.500	Qualification to playoffs
5	TalTech/OPTIBET	30	12	18	2342	2414	−72	.400	Qualification to playoffs
6	Pärnu Sadam	30	12	18	2364	2383	−19	.400	Qualification to playoffs
7	Keila KK	30	11	19	2368	2631	−263	.367	Qualification to playoffs
8	Tallinna Kalev/Audentes	30	7	23	2297	2447	−150	.233	Qualification to playoffs
9	BC Tarvas	30	3	27	2180	2838	−658	.100	

Source: basket.ee

== Bracket ==
Quarterfinals
1	BC Kalev/Cramo	3
8	Tallinna Kalev/Audentes	0
4	Viimsi/Sportland	3
5	TalTech/OPTIBET	0
2	Tartu Ülikool Maks & Moorits	3
7	Keila KK	0
3	AVIS UTILITAS Rapla	2
6	Pärnu Sadam	3

Semifinals
1	BC Kalev/Cramo	3
4	Viimsi/Sportland	0
2	Tartu Ülikool Maks & Moorits	3
6	Pärnu Sadam	2

Finals
1	BC Kalev/Cramo	3
2	Tartu Ülikool Maks & Moorits	0
Third place
4	Viimsi/Sportland	2
6	Pärnu Sadam	3

== Quarterfinals ==
All times are in Eastern European Summer Time (UTC+03:00)

The quarterfinals are best-of-five series.

=== BC Kalev/Cramo vs. Tallinna Kalev/Audentes ===
16 April 2023	BC Kalev/Cramo	84–73 (Series: 1–0)	Tallinna Kalev/Audentes	Tallinn
15:00	Scoring by quarter: 23–22, 23–24, 15–17, 23–10
	Pts: Dorbek 25; Rebs: Dorbek, Hermet 8 Asts: Kovliar 7 PIR: Dorbek 28	Boxscore	Pts: Paiste 18; Rebs: Gadiliauskas 7 Asts: Veideman 7 PIR: Gadiliauskas 24	Arena: Kalev Sports Hall; Attendance: 369; Referees: R. Peerandi, I. Kitsing, R. Peerandi

19 April 2023	Tallinna Kalev/Audentes	64–92 (Series: 0–2)	BC Kalev/Cramo	Tallinn
19:00	Scoring by quarter: 16–24, 18–22, 10–22, 20–24
	Pts: Veideman 16; Rebs: Kangur 8 Asts: Paiste 4 PIR: Gadiliauskas 19	Boxscore	Pts: Konontšuk, Van Beck 14; Rebs: Konontšuk 7 Asts: Dorbek 7 PIR: Konontšuk 22	Arena: Audentes Sports Center; Attendance: 374; Referees: M. Männiste, A. Mohov, I. Kelement

22 April 2023	BC Kalev/Cramo	84–38 (Series: 3–0)	Tallinna Kalev/Audentes	Tallinn
17:00	Scoring by quarter: 21–9, 21–11, 21–7, 21–11
	Pts: Toom 12; Rebs: Konontšuk 8 Asts: Toom 5 PIR: Toom 22	Boxscore	Pts: three players 6 Rebs: Gadiliauskas 8 Asts: Simpson 3 PIR: Kangur 8	Arena: Nord Cramo Sports Hall; Attendance: 281; Referees: A. Halliko, H. Laas, M. Allik

=== Tartu Ülikool Maks & Moorits vs. Keila KK ===
14 April 2023	Tartu Ülikool Maks & Moorits	65–60 (Series: 1–0)	Keila KK	Tartu
19:00	Scoring by quarter: 15–18, 22–16, 12–17, 16–9
	Pts: Gordon 22; Rebs: Eelmäe, Gordon 10; Asts: Suurorg 7 PIR: Eelmäe 23	Boxscore	Pts: Myronenko 16; Rebs: Myronenko 11; Asts: Vītols 5 PIR: Myronenko 22	Arena: University of Tartu Sports Hall; Attendance: 1,008; Referees: M. Männiste, R. Värv, I. Kitsing

18 April 2023	Keila KK	61–83 (Series: 0–2)	Tartu Ülikool Maks & Moorits	Keila
19:30	Scoring by quarter: 21–23, 22–19, 10–27, 8–14
	Pts: Myronenko 16; Rebs: Mikhieiev 8 Asts: Vītols 7 PIR: Myronenko 23	Boxscore	Pts: Böckler, Gordon 19; Rebs: James 10; Asts: Suurorg 6 PIR: James 27	Arena: Keila Health Center; Attendance: 622; Referees: M. Männiste, R. Värv, I. Kitsing

23 April 2023	Tartu Ülikool Maks & Moorits	95–74 (Series: 3–0)	Keila KK	Tartu
16:00	Scoring by quarter: 19–23, 33–13, 28–16, 15–22
	Pts: Gordon 21; Rebs: Eelmäe, Pavelka 9 Asts: Böckler 8 PIR: Pavelka, Voinalovych 26	Boxscore	Pts: Saks 17; Rebs: Mikhieiev 8 Asts: Vītols 8 PIR: Saks 20	Arena: University of Tartu Sports Hall; Attendance: 687; Referees: R. Peerandi, R. Värv, E. Tiidor

=== AVIS UTILITAS Rapla vs. Pärnu Sadam ===
13 April 2023	AVIS UTILITAS Rapla	95–93(OT) (Series: 1–0)	Pärnu Sadam	Rapla
19:00	Scoring by quarter: 19–27, 13–23, 24–11, 23–18, Overtime: 16–14
	Pts: Stephens 24; Rebs: Woods 9 Asts: Laane 9 PIR: Woods 32	Boxscore	Pts: Kirves 27; Rebs: Kirves 11; Asts: Hart 9 PIR: Kirves 37	Arena: Sadolin Sports Hall; Attendance: 948; Referees: A. Halliko, H. Laas, R. Kobin

17 April 2023	Pärnu Sadam	83–71 (Series: 1–1)	AVIS UTILITAS Rapla	Pärnu
19:00	Scoring by quarter: 20–16, 21–24, 19–13, 23–18
	Pts: Kirves 24; Rebs: Sutt 10; Asts: Sutt 4 PIR: Kirves 30	Boxscore	Pts: Cheese 20; Rebs: Woods 16; Asts: Laane 6 PIR: Tomić 28	Arena: Pärnu Sports Hall; Attendance: 824; Referees: R. Peerandi, R. Värv, I. Kitsing

21 April 2023	AVIS UTILITAS Rapla	72–80 (Series: 1–2)	Pärnu Sadam	Rapla
19:00	Scoring by quarter: 19–33, 16–15, 14–14, 23–18
	Pts: Cheese 21; Rebs: Niits, Tomić 5 Asts: Laane 6 PIR: Cheese 22	Boxscore	Pts: Hart 26; Rebs: Kirves 7 Asts: Hart 7 PIR: Hart 33	Arena: Sadolin Sports Hall; Attendance: 650; Referees: M. Männiste, R. Värv, R. Konks

25 April 2023	Pärnu Sadam	58–75 (Series: 2–2)	AVIS UTILITAS Rapla	Pärnu
19:00	Scoring by quarter: 13–16, 18–21, 14–16, 13–22
	Pts: Kirves 15; Rebs: Kirves 11; Asts: Sutt 4 PIR: Kirves 21	Boxscore	Pts: Cheese 18; Rebs: Tomić 10; Asts: Laane 5 PIR: Tomić 20	Arena: Pärnu Sports Hall; Attendance: 1,049; Referees: R. Peerandi, A. Halliko, I. Kitsing

28 April 2023	AVIS UTILITAS Rapla	65–78 (Series: 3–2)	Pärnu Sadam	Rapla
19:00	Scoring by quarter: 14–21, 14–21, 20–16, 17–20
	Pts: Kaldre 14; Rebs: Tomić 9 Asts: Laane 9 PIR: Tomić 17	Boxscore	Pts: McCarthy 22; Rebs: Kirves 8 Asts: Hart 7 PIR: Kirves 24	Arena: Sadolin Sports Hall; Attendance: 988; Referees: M. Männiste, R. Värv, R. Konks

=== Viimsi/Sportland vs. TalTech/OPTIBET ===
12 April 2023	Viimsi/Sportland	85–79 (Series: 1–0)	TalTech/OPTIBET	Haabneeme
19:30	Scoring by quarter: 17–19, 25–16, 21–27, 22–17
	Pts: Lips 21; Rebs: Lips 11; Asts: Harris 9 PIR: Lips 39	Boxscore	Pts: Gludītis 21; Rebs: Metsalu 9 Asts: Gludītis 7 PIR: Gludītis 21	Arena: Forus Sports Center; Attendance: 516; Referees: R. Peerandi, M. Uuehendrik, R. Konks

16 April 2023	TalTech/OPTIBET	77–88 (Series: 0–2)	Viimsi/Sportland	Tallinn
17:00	Scoring by quarter: 22–24, 15–22, 16–16, 24–26
	Pts: Ilves 19; Rebs: Ilves 8 Asts: Keedus 4 PIR: Ilves 20	Boxscore	Pts: Toppin 21; Rebs: Toppin 10; Asts: Post 12; PIR: Toppin 30	Arena: TalTech Sports Hall; Attendance: 707; Referees: R. Värv, H. Laas, E. Tiidor

20 April 2023	Viimsi/Sportland	66–60 (Series: 3–0)	TalTech/OPTIBET	Haabneeme
19:30	Scoring by quarter: 14–13, 16–16, 20–21, 16–10
	Pts: Harris, Zaķis 16; Rebs: Lips, Toppin 12; Asts: Post 3 PIR: Lips 26	Boxscore	Pts: Metsalu 26; Rebs: Metsalu 11; Asts: Ilves 5 PIR: Metsalu 29	Arena: Forus Sports Center; Attendance: 691; Referees: A. Halliko, M. Männiste, I. Kitsing

== Semifinals ==
All times are in Eastern European Summer Time (UTC+03:00)

The semifinals are best-of-five series.

=== BC Kalev/Cramo vs. Viimsi/Sportland ===
3 May 2023	BC Kalev/Cramo	88–73 (Series: 1–0)	Viimsi/Sportland	Tallinn
19:30	Scoring by quarter: 17–23, 26–20, 26–23, 19–7
	Pts: Kovliar 18; Rebs: Dorbek, Konontšuk 7 Asts: Gilbert 6 PIR: Kovliar 20	Boxscore	Pts: Zaķis 17; Rebs: Harris, Zaķis 6 Asts: Post 6 PIR: Zaķis 20	Arena: Kalev Sports Hall; Attendance: 562; Referees: A. Halliko, R. Värv, E. Tiidor

6 May 2023	Viimsi/Sportland	62–86 (Series: 0–2)	BC Kalev/Cramo	Haabneeme
17:00	Scoring by quarter: 15–22, 14–24, 18–20, 15–20
	Pts: Toppin 16; Rebs: Toppin 9 Asts: Harris 7 PIR: Harris 30	Boxscore	Pts: Van Beck 19; Rebs: Jurkatamm, Toom 5 Asts: Gilbert 7 PIR: Gilbert 20	Arena: Forus Sports Center; Attendance: 852; Referees: M. Männiste, R. Konks, R. Kobin

9 May 2023	BC Kalev/Cramo	78–76 (Series: 3–0)	Viimsi/Sportland	Tallinn
19:30	Scoring by quarter: 22–19, 19–28, 27–19, 10–10
	Pts: Konontšuk 16; Rebs: Konontšuk 9 Asts: Dorbek 4 PIR: Konontšuk 23	Boxscore	Pts: Lips 27; Rebs: Toppin 5 Asts: Post 7 PIR: Lips 32	Arena: Kalev Sports Hall; Attendance: 488; Referees: R. Peerandi, R. Värv, H. Laas

=== Tartu Ülikool Maks & Moorits vs. Pärnu Sadam ===
2 May 2023	Tartu Ülikool Maks & Moorits	56–71 (Series: 0–1)	Pärnu Sadam	Tartu
19:00	Scoring by quarter: 15–19, 17–21, 13–15, 11–16
	Pts: Gordon 13; Rebs: Pavelka 9 Asts: Gordon 6 PIR: Pavelka 24	Boxscore	Pts: Hart 15; Rebs: Kirves 9 Asts: McCarthy, Sutt 3 PIR: McCarthy 25	Arena: University of Tartu Sports Hall; Attendance: 1,031; Referees: M. Männiste, M. Uuehendrik, I. Kitsing

5 May 2023	Pärnu Sadam	81–95 (Series: 1–1)	Tartu Ülikool Maks & Moorits	Pärnu
19:00	Scoring by quarter: 30–26, 19–20, 12–24, 20–25
	Pts: Kirves 31; Rebs: Kirves 14; Asts: Hart, Sutt 3 PIR: Kirves 45	Boxscore	Pts: Gordon 25; Rebs: Gordon, Pavelka 6 Asts: Gordon 4 PIR: Voinalovych 20	Arena: Pärnu Sports Hall; Attendance: 1,121; Referees: H. Laas, R. Konks, R. Värv

8 May 2023	Tartu Ülikool Maks & Moorits	72–71 (Series: 2–1)	Pärnu Sadam	Tartu
19:00	Scoring by quarter: 20–23, 20–16, 14–17, 18–15
	Pts: Gordon, Voinalovych 18; Rebs: James 9 Asts: Böckler, Suurorg 4 PIR: Pavelka 21	Boxscore	Pts: Kirves 22; Rebs: Kirves 13; Asts: Sutt 5 PIR: Kirves 35	Arena: University of Tartu Sports Hall; Attendance: 1,253; Referees: A. Halliko, M. Männiste, M. Uuehendrik

10 May 2023	Pärnu Sadam	85–79 (Series: 2–2)	Tartu Ülikool Maks & Moorits	Pärnu
19:00	Scoring by quarter: 19–15, 17–29, 28–20, 21–15
	Pts: Kirves 21; Rebs: Kirves 12; Asts: Hart, Valge 3 PIR: Kirves 29	Boxscore	Pts: Gordon, Voinalovych 23; Rebs: Gordon 8 Asts: Rosenthal 9 PIR: Gordon 29	Arena: Pärnu Sports Hall; Attendance: 945; Referees: A. Halliko, R. Konks, I. Kitsing

12 May 2023	Tartu Ülikool Maks & Moorits	78–68 (Series: 3–2)	Pärnu Sadam	Tartu
19:00	Scoring by quarter: 14–10, 22–18, 17–25, 25–15
	Pts: three players 13; Rebs: Pavelka 11; Asts: Suurorg 4 PIR: Pavelka 22	Boxscore	Pts: Kirves 20; Rebs: Kirves 11; Asts: Valge 4 PIR: Kirves 24	Arena: University of Tartu Sports Hall; Attendance: 1,657; Referees: A. Halliko, M. Uuehendrik, R. Konks

== Third place games ==
All times are in Eastern European Summer Time (UTC+03:00)

The quarterfinals are best-of-five series.

=== Viimsi/Sportland vs. Pärnu Sadam ===
16 May 2023	Viimsi/Sportland	86–87(OT) (Series: 0–1)	Pärnu Sadam	Haabneeme
19:30	Scoring by quarter: 15–13, 19–17, 24–26, 19–21, Overtime: 9–10
	Pts: Lips 23; Rebs: Harris 10; Asts: Post 6 PIR: Harris 32	Boxscore	Pts: Valge 18; Rebs: Tamm 13; Asts: Hart 6 PIR: Tamm 21	Arena: Forus Sports Center; Attendance: 617; Referees: R. Värv, H. Laas, I. Kitsing

20 May 2023	Pärnu Sadam	78–82 (Series: 1–1)	Viimsi/Sportland	Pärnu
17:00	Scoring by quarter: 14–19, 21–20, 16–17, 27–26
	Pts: Valge 16; Rebs: Kirves 13; Asts: Hart 9 PIR: Hart 23	Boxscore	Pts: Toppin 21; Rebs: Toppin 13; Asts: Harris, Post 7 PIR: Toppin 35	Arena: Pärnu Sports Hall; Attendance: 580; Referees: M. Männiste, R. Konks, E. Tiidor

22 May 2023	Viimsi/Sportland	71–80 (Series: 1–2)	Pärnu Sadam	Haabneeme
19:30	Scoring by quarter: 13–14, 22–20, 19–23, 17–23
	Pts: Zaķis 14; Rebs: Toppin 10; Asts: Post 9 PIR: Harris 20	Boxscore	Pts: Hart 27; Rebs: Hart, Kirves 9 Asts: Valge 4 PIR: Hart 33	Arena: Forus Sports Center; Attendance: 703; Referees: A. Halliko, R. Värv, R. Kobin

24 May 2023	Pärnu Sadam	72–95 (Series: 2–2)	Viimsi/Sportland	Pärnu
19:00	Scoring by quarter: 19–21, 17–32, 17–20, 19–22
	Pts: Kirves, Valge 11; Rebs: Kirves 7 Asts: Aav, Hart 4 PIR: Kirves 14	Boxscore	Pts: Post 21; Rebs: Lips 7 Asts: Post 9 PIR: Post 34	Arena: Pärnu Sports Hall; Attendance: 843; Referees: M. Uuehendrik, R. Konks, H. Laas

26 May 2023	Viimsi/Sportland	69–91 (Series: 2–3)	Pärnu Sadam	Haabneeme
19:30	Scoring by quarter: 24–19, 13–26, 17–26, 15–20
	Pts: Lips 18; Rebs: Zaķis 9 Asts: Post 7 PIR: Lips 22	Boxscore	Pts: Hart 28; Rebs: Kirves 7 Asts: Hart 4 PIR: Hart 35	Arena: Forus Sports Center; Attendance: 1,323; Referees: A. Halliko, M. Männiste, M. Uuehendrik

== Finals ==
All times are in Eastern European Summer Time (UTC+03:00)

The quarterfinals are best-of-five series.

=== BC Kalev/Cramo vs. Tartu Ülikool Maks & Moorits ===
18 May 2023	BC Kalev/Cramo	71–65 (Series: 1–0)	Tartu Ülikool Maks & Moorits	Tallinn
19:30	Scoring by quarter: 13–18, 23–14, 16–21, 19–12
	Pts: Kovliar 21; Rebs: Hermet 8 Asts: Gilbert, Kovliar 3 PIR: Hermet 28	Boxscore	Pts: Gordon 16; Rebs: Gordon, Pavelka 7 Asts: Gordon, Kivi 3 PIR: Pavelka 16	Arena: Kalev Sports Hall; Attendance: 902; Referees: M. Männiste, H. Laas, I. Kitsing

23 May 2023	Tartu Ülikool Maks & Moorits	73–90 (Series: 0–2)	BC Kalev/Cramo	Tartu
19:00	Scoring by quarter: 17–24, 18–31, 23–17, 15–18
	Pts: Gordon 25; Rebs: Voinalovych 5 Asts: Gordon 7 PIR: Gordon 26	Boxscore	Pts: Konontšuk 23; Rebs: Konontšuk 7 Asts: Gilbert 8 PIR: Konontšuk 28	Arena: University of Tartu Sports Hall; Attendance: 2,057; Referees: M. Männiste, R. Konks, R. Kobin

27 May 2023	BC Kalev/Cramo	89–82 (Series: 3–0)	Tartu Ülikool Maks & Moorits	Tallinn
18:00	Scoring by quarter: 16–19, 20–24, 26–19, 27–20
	Pts: Kovliar 25; Rebs: Konontšuk 6 Asts: Kovliar 6 PIR: Kovliar 29	Boxscore	Pts: Gordon 18; Rebs: Böckler 6 Asts: James 4 PIR: Gordon 20	Arena: Kalev Sports Hall; Attendance: 1,102; Referees: A. Halliko, M. Männiste, R. Värv

== Awards ==
=== KML Finals MVP ===
- (Ukraine) Oleksandr Kovliar (BC Kalev/Cramo)

=== All-KML Team ===
Position	Player	Team
PG	(United States) Ty Gordon	Tartu Ülikool Maks & Moorits
SG	(Estonia) Hugo Toom	BC Kalev/Cramo
SF	(Estonia) Artur Konontšuk	BC Kalev/Cramo
PF	(Estonia) Mihkel Kirves	Pärnu Sadam
C	(Estonia) Karl Johan Lips	Viimsi/Sportland

== Individual statistics ==
=== Points ===
Rank	Name	Team	Games	Points	PPG
1	(United States) Ty Gordon	Tartu Ülikool Maks & Moorits	11	209	19.00
2	(Estonia) Mihkel Kirves	Pärnu Sadam	15	267	17.80
3	(United States) Tyler Cheese	AVIS UTILITAS Rapla	5	87	17.40

=== Rebounds ===
Rank	Name	Team	Games	Rebounds	RPG
1	(Estonia) Mihkel Kirves	Pärnu Sadam	15	153	10.20
2	(Estonia) Oliver Metsalu	TalTech/OPTIBET	3	27	9.00
3	(United States) Malik Toppin	Viimsi/Sportland	11	88	8.00

=== Assists ===
Rank	Name	Team	Games	Assists	APG
1	(Estonia) Rait-Riivo Laane	AVIS UTILITAS Rapla	5	35	7.00
2	(Estonia) Siim-Markus Post	Viimsi/Sportland	11	75	6.82
3	(Latvia) Mārcis Vītols	Keila KK	3	20	6.67

== See also ==
- 2022–23 Latvian–Estonian Basketball League
