= Sutt (surname) =

Family name

Origin
- Language: Estonian
- Meaning: "European river lamprey" (Lampetra fluviatilis)
- Region of origin: Estonia

Sutt is an Estonian language surname, a colloquial name for the European river lamprey (Estonian: jõesilm).

As of 1 January 2021, 201 men and 223 women in Estonia have the surname Sutt. Sutt is ranked the 296th most common surname for men in Estonia and 288th for women. The surname Sutt is most common in Pärnu County, where 22.00 per 10,000 inhabitants of the county bear the surname.

Notable people bearing the surname Sutt include:

- Andres Sutt (born 1967), politician.
- Hugo Sutt (1912–1940), opera and operetta baritone
- Roland Sutt (born 1972), drummer (Vennaskond)
- Saimon Sutt (born 1995), basketball player
- Toomas Sutt (1938–1994), philosopher of science and biologist-geneticist
