= 2020–21 KML season =

Estonian basketball championships

PAF Korvpalli Meistriliiga^{1}
- Season: 2020–21
- Duration: 10 October 2020 – 17 April 2021 (regular season); 19 April 2021 – 17 May 2021 (play-offs)
- Teams: 7

Finals
- Champions: BC Kalev/Cramo; 12th Estonian title
- Runners-up: Pärnu Sadam
- Third place: AVIS UTILITAS Rapla
- Fourth place: Rakvere Tarvas
- Finals MVP: Chavaughn Lewis
- ^{1}Sponsored league name, referring to PAF.

The 2020–21 Korvpalli Meistriliiga (KML) season, also known as PAF Korvpalli Meistriliiga for sponsorship reasons, was the 95th season of the top-tier basketball league in Estonia.

The play-offs began on 19 April 2021 and ended on 17 May with BC Kalev/Cramo defeating Pärnu Sadam in the finals for their 12th Estonian Championship.

== Teams ==
=== Venues and locations ===
Location of teams in 2020–21 Korvpalli Meistriliiga

Team	Home city	Arena	Capacity
AVIS UTILITAS Rapla	Rapla	Sadolin Sports Hall	958
BC Kalev/Cramo	Tallinn	Kalev Sports Hall	1,700
Pärnu Sadam	Pärnu	Pärnu Sports Hall	1,820
Rakvere Tarvas	Rakvere	Rakvere Sports Hall	2,747
Tallinna Kalev/TLÜ	Tallinn	Sõle Sports Centre	153
TalTech	Tallinn	TalTech Sports Hall	1,000
Tartu Ülikool Maks & Moorits	Tartu	University of Tartu Sports Hall	2,600

=== Personnel and sponsorship ===
Team	Head coach	Captain	Kit manufacturer	Shirt sponsor
AVIS UTILITAS Rapla	(Estonia) Toomas Annuk	(Latvia) Roberts Freimanis	Spalding	Fenix Bet & Casino
BC Kalev/Cramo	(Latvia) Roberts Štelmahers	(Estonia) Martin Dorbek	Nike	Unibet
Pärnu Sadam	(Estonia) Heiko Rannula	(Latvia) Lauris Blaus	Joma	Betsafe
Rakvere Tarvas	(Latvia) Juris Umbraško	(Estonia) Renato Lindmets	Spalding	Rakvere
Tallinna Kalev/TLÜ	(Estonia) Valdo Lips	(Estonia) Mario Paiste	Nike	Tallinn
TalTech	(Estonia) Kris Killing	(Estonia) Oliver Metsalu	Nike	Tallinn University of Technology
Tartu Ülikool Maks & Moorits	(Estonia) Toomas Kandimaa	(Estonia) Robin Kivi	Spalding	Maks & Moorits

=== Coaching changes ===
Team	2019–20 season	2020–21 season
Off-season
Tartu Ülikool Maks & Moorits	(Estonia) Priit Vene	(Estonia) Toomas Kandimaa
In-season
Tallinna Kalev/TLÜ	(Estonia) Martin Müürsepp	(Estonia) Valdo Lips

== Regular season ==
Team standings are calculated as follows:

1. Four rounds of Estonian-Latvian Basketball League regular season games.
2. Two rounds of Korvpalli Meistriliiga regular season games.
3. BC Kalev/Cramo's Estonian-Latvian Basketball League third and fourth round games are counted twice.

Any games postponed and not rearranged until 17 April 2021 are cancelled and regular season standings are determined by winning percentage.

=== League table ===
Pos	Team	Pld	W	L	PF	PA	PD	PCT	Qualification
1	BC Kalev/Cramo	34	32	2	2399	1901	+498	.941	Qualification to semifinals
2	Pärnu Sadam	34	25	9	2718	2468	+250	.735	Qualification to quarterfinals
3	AVIS UTILITAS Rapla	34	20	14	2573	2483	+90	.588	Qualification to quarterfinals
4	Rakvere Tarvas	32	12	20	2436	2511	−75	.375	Qualification to quarterfinals
5	TalTech	31	11	20	2209	2454	−245	.355	Qualification to quarterfinals
6	Tartu Ülikool Maks & Moorits	34	11	23	2420	2713	−293	.324	Qualification to quarterfinals
7	Tallinna Kalev/TLÜ	31	4	27	2340	2639	−299	.129	Qualification to quarterfinals

Source: Korvpalli Meistriliiga

=== Results ===
Home \ Away	RAP	KAL	PÄR	TRV	TLK	TCH	TRT
AVIS UTILITAS Rapla	—	—	64–72	83–81	96–88	—	81–65
BC Kalev/Cramo	—	—	—	—	—	—	—
Pärnu Sadam	—	—	—	93–62	77–66	101–73	84–62
Rakvere Tarvas	72–84	—	58–87	—	86–89	90–77	80–76
Tallinna Kalev/TLÜ	72–87	—	—	—	—	—	—
TalTech	71–87	—	83–95	—	—	—	78–95
Tartu Ülikool Maks & Moorits	67–77	—	77–89	104–101	86–61	—	—

Source: Korvpalli Meistriliiga
Legend: Blue = home team win; Red = away team win.

== Playoffs ==
The play-offs began on 19 April and ended on 17 May. The tournament concluded with BC Kalev/Cramo defeating Pärnu Sadam three games to one in the finals.

=== Bracket ===
Quarterfinals
4	Rakvere Tarvas	2
5	TalTech	0
2	Pärnu Sadam	2
7	Tallinna Kalev/TLÜ	0
3	AVIS UTILITAS Rapla	2
6	Tartu Ülikool Maks & Moorits	1

Semifinals
1	BC Kalev/Cramo	3
4	Rakvere Tarvas	0
2	Pärnu Sadam	3
3	AVIS UTILITAS Rapla	0

Finals
1	BC Kalev/Cramo	3
2	Pärnu Sadam	1
Third place
3	AVIS UTILITAS Rapla	3
4	Rakvere Tarvas	2

== Awards ==
=== Finals Most Valuable Player ===
- (United States) Chavaughn Lewis (BC Kalev/Cramo)

=== Best Young Player ===
- (Estonia) Hugo Toom (Pärnu Sadam)

=== Best Defender ===
- (Estonia) Märt Rosenthal (Pärnu Sadam)

=== Coach of the Year ===
- (Latvia) Roberts Štelmahers (BC Kalev/Cramo)

=== All-KML Team ===
Pos	Player	Team
PG	(United States) Marcus Keene	BC Kalev/Cramo
SG	(Finland) Edon Maxhuni	Pärnu Sadam
SF	(Estonia) Janari Jõesaar	BC Kalev/Cramo
PF	(Latvia) Roberts Freimanis	AVIS UTILITAS Rapla
C	(United States) Devin Thomas	BC Kalev/Cramo

== See also ==
- 2020–21 Latvian–Estonian Basketball League
- 2020–21 VTB United League
- 2020–21 Basketball Champions League
- 2020–21 FIBA Europe Cup
