= Heiko Rannula =

Estonian professional basketball coach (born 1983)

Legia Warsaw
- Title: Head coach
- League: Polish Basketball League; Basketball Champions League

Personal information
- Born: 28 July 1983 (age 43) Ilmatsalu, Estonia

Career information
- Playing career: 2001–2014
- Position: Point guard
- Coaching career: 2015–present

Career history

Playing
- 2001–2006: Tartu Ülikool
- 2006–2010: Valga-Valka
- 2010: BC Kalev
- 2011: Rakvere Tarvas
- 2011: Forssan Koripojat
- 2011–2012: Garonne ASPTT Basket
- 2012–2013: Valga-Valka
- 2013–2014: BC Pärnu

Coaching
- 2015–2016: BC Pärnu (assistant)
- 2016–2022: BC Pärnu
- 2020–2024: Estonia (assistant)
- 2022–2025: BC Kalev
- 2024–present: Estonia
- 2025–present: Legia Warsaw

Career highlights
- As player: 2× Estonian League champion (2001, 2004); 2× Estonian Cup winner (2002, 2004); As head coach: 2× Polish League champion (2025, 2026); 3× Estonian League champion (2022, 2023, 2024); Polish Supercup winner (2026); 3× Estonian Cup winner (2022, 2024, 2025); Estonian League Coach of the Year (2022)

Heiko Rannula (born 28 July 1983) is an Estonian professional basketball coach and former player, who is currently a head coach for Legia Warsaw of the Polish Basketball League (PLK), and for Estonian National Team.

== Playing career ==
Heiko Rannula graduated from Tartu Karlova Gymnasium in 2001. He started training with Jüri Neissaare. He has played in the Estonian youth (U16) and junior (U20) teams. He has also been a member of the Estonian National team. Rannula is the Estonian youth champion in the U16 and U20 age classes. He became the Estonian champion with Tartu team in 2001 and 2004, in addition to winning the Estonian Cup in 2002 and 2004. He played for several Estonian basketball clubs.

== Coaching career ==
He started working as an assistant coach at KK Pärnu in 2015, but was promoted the head coach in 2016. Under his guidance, the club has won a bronze medal at the Estonian league in 2019 and a silver medal in 2021. In 2022, he became the Estonian Champion. In summer 2022, Rannula became the head coach for Estonian most ambitious team BC Kalev.

On February 18, 2025, it was announced that he signed with Legia Warsaw of the Polish Basketball League (PLK). Club held 6th position at the time. Rannula led Legia Warsaw to the Polish championship after a 56-year hiatus.

He has worked as an assistant coach for the Estonian U18 and U20 youth teams. Since 2019, he is the assistant coach of the Estonian men's national team. Rannula became the head coach of the Estonian National Team in June 2024 when Jukka Toijala left.

== Coaching record ==
Abbreviations:
SF; semi finals.
QF; quarter finals.
EF; eight finals.
SR; second round.
RS; regular season (group stage).
QR; qualification round.
CNX; cancelled.
DNF; did not finish.
DNP; did not participate.

League	Club	Season	Domestic Competitions		Regional Competitions			European Competitions	
League	Club	Season	Championship	Cup	BBL	LEBL	ENBL	Competition	Position
Korvpalli Meistriliiga	BC Pärnu	2016–17	4th	3rd	EF	No competition	No competition	DNP	
Korvpalli Meistriliiga	BC Pärnu	2017–18	4th	No competition	QF	No competition	No competition	DNP	
Korvpalli Meistriliiga	BC Pärnu	2018–19	3rd	No competition	No competition	8th	No competition	DNP	
Korvpalli Meistriliiga	BC Pärnu	2019–20	CNX	No competition	No competition	CNX	No competition	DNP	
Korvpalli Meistriliiga	BC Pärnu	2020–21	2nd	3rd	No competition	Top 6	No competition	DNP	
Korvpalli Meistriliiga	BC Pärnu	2021–22	1st	QF	No competition	3rd	DNP	4 FIBA Europe Cup	QR
Korvpalli Meistriliiga	BC Kalev	2022–23	1st	1st	No competition	4th	RS	4 FIBA Europe Cup	SF
Korvpalli Meistriliiga	BC Kalev	2023–24	1st	1st	No competition	2nd	DNP	4 FIBA Europe Cup	RS
Korvpalli Meistriliiga	BC Kalev	2024–25	DNP	1st	No competition	DNF	DNP	4 FIBA Europe Cup	SR
Polish Basketball League	Legia Warsaw	2024–25	1st	DNP	No competition	DNP		DNP	
Polish Basketball League	Legia Warsaw	2025–26	1st	QF	No competition	DNP		3 Champions League	RS
