= Artur Konontšuk =

Estonian basketball player

No. 34 – Rostock Seawolves
- Position: Small forward
- League: Basketball Bundesliga; EuroCup

Personal information
- Born: 9 May 2000 (age 26) Pärnu, Estonia
- Listed height: 2.00 m (6 ft 7 in)
- Listed weight: 101 kg (223 lb)

Career information
- College: Southern Miss (2019–2021)
- NBA draft: 2022: undrafted

Career history
- 2014–2015: Paulus
- 2016–2017: Kadrina Karud
- 2017–2018: Pärnu
- 2017–2018: →Paulus
- 2018–2019: Get Better Academy
- 2021–2022: Pärnu
- 2022–2023: Kalev
- 2023–2024: Granada
- 2024–2025: Oldenburg
- 2025–2026: Bursaspor
- 2026–present: Rostock Seawolves

Career highlights
- 2× Estonian League champion (2022, 2023); KML All-Star Five (2023)

Artur Konontšuk (born 9 May 2000) is an Estonian professional basketball player for Rostock Seawolves of the Basketball Bundesliga (BBL) and the EuroCup. Standing at 2.00 m (6 ft 7 in), he plays at the small forward position. He also represents the Estonian national basketball team internationally.

== Professional career ==
On 17 August 2021, Konontšuk signed a one-year contract with his hometown team Pärnu Sadam. In the 2021–22 KML season, he helped his team to their first Estonian League championship.

On 13 July 2022, Konontšuk signed a one-year deal with an option for one more season with BC Kalev. With Kalev, he reached FIBA Europe Cup play-offs and was the leader in efficiency during the first leg of quarter-finals. He was named FIBA Europe Cup MVP in March.

On July 25, 2025, he signed with Bursaspor Basketbol of the Basketbol Süper Ligi (BSL).

On June 18, 2026, he signed with Rostock Seawolves of the Basketball Bundesliga and the EuroCup.

== National team career ==
Konontšuk made his debut for the Estonian national team on 11 November 2022, in a 2023 FIBA Basketball World Cup qualifier against Sweden. He also represented the Estonian national team at EuroBasket 2025.

== Career statistics ==
Legend
GP	Games played	GS	Games started	MPG	Minutes per game
FG%	Field goal percentage	3P%	3-point field goal percentage	FT%	Free throw percentage
RPG	Rebounds per game	APG	Assists per game	SPG	Steals per game
BPG	Blocks per game	PPG	Points per game	**Bold**	Career high

=== College ===
Year	Team	GP	GS	MPG	FG%	3P%	FT%	RPG	APG	SPG	BPG	PPG
2019–20	Southern Miss	**29**	**20**	**26.3**	**.426**	.289	**.711**	**3.6**	**1.0**	**.5**	**.3**	**6.7**
2020–21	Southern Miss	25	4	16.1	.358	**.317**	.571	2.7	**1.0**	.2	.2	4.6
Career		54	24	21.6	.398	.301	.673	3.2	1.0	.4	.3	5.7

=== National team ===
Team	Tournament	Pos.	GP	PPG	RPG	APG
Estonia	EuroBasket 2025	19th	5	11.4	3.0	1.2

== Awards and accomplishments ==
- Estonian League champion: 2022
- FIBA Europe Cup MVP of the March 2023.
