= Janari Jõesaar =

Estonian basketball player

No. 23 – Start Lublin
- Position: Shooting guard / small forward
- League: PLK

Personal information
- Born: 8 December 1993 (age 32) Tartu, Estonia
- Listed height: 1.98 m (6 ft 6 in)
- Listed weight: 94 kg (207 lb)

Career information
- High school: Sunrise Christian Academy (Bel Aire, Kansas)
- College: Ole Miss (2013–2014); Texas–Pan American (2014–2015)
- NBA draft: 2016: undrafted
- Playing career: 2015–present

Career history
- 2015: Rapla
- 2015–2016: Rakvere Tarvas
- 2016–2017: Tartu Ülikool
- 2017–2019: BC Kalev
- 2019: Canarias
- 2019–2020: BC Kalev
- 2020: Manresa
- 2020–2021: BC Kalev
- 2021–2022: Medi Bayreuth
- 2022–2024: Anwil Włocławek
- 2024–2025: Dziki Warszawa
- 2025–2026: Bosna BH Telecom
- 2026–present: Start Lublin

Career highlights
- Bosnian League champion (2026); Latvian–Estonian League champion (2021); Latvian–Estonian League All-Star Five (2021); 2× Estonian League champion (2018, 2021); Bosnian Cup winner (2026); Estonian Cup winner (2020); KML All-Star Five (2017); VTB United League All-Star (2019); Latvian–Estonian League All-Star (2019); Latvian–Estonian League All-Star Game MVP (2019); Second-team All-WAC (2015); WAC All-Newcomer Team (2015)

Janari Jõesaar (born 8 December 1993) is an Estonian professional basketball player for Start Lublin of the Polish Basketball League (PLK). He is a 1.98 m (6 ft 6 in) tall small forward. He played college basketball for the Ole Miss Rebels and the Texas–Pan American Broncs. He also represents the Estonian national basketball team internationally.

== College career ==
In his sophomore season, Jõesaar earned second-team All-WAC honors after leading Texas–Pan American in scoring with 16.9 points per game.

College recruiting
Name	Hometown	School	Height	Weight	Commit date
Janari Jõesaar; SF	Bel Aire, KS	Sunrise Christian	6 ft 6 in (1.98 m)	180 lb (82 kg)	Nov 1, 2012
Janari Jõesaar; SF	Recruit ratings: Scout: Rivals: (NR)				
Overall recruit ranking: Scout: Not Ranked Rivals: Not Ranked ESPN: Not Ranked
Note: In many cases, Scout, Rivals, 247Sports, On3, and ESPN may conflict in their listings of height and weight.; In these cases, the average was taken. ESPN grades are on a 100-point scale.; Sources: "Ole Miss 2013 Basketball Commitments". Rivals.; "2013 Ole Miss Basketball Commits". Scout.; "ESPN". ESPN.; "Scout.com Team Recruiting Rankings". Scout.; "2013 Team Ranking". Rivals.

== Professional career ==
In 2015, Jõesaar joined Rapla during the preseason, but left after making just three appearances in the Estonian Basketball Cup. On 27 October 2015, he joined Rakvere Tarvas.

On 24 February 2019 Jõesaar signed a 1.5-year contract with Liga ACB team Iberostar Tenerife.

In June 2020 he signed a 2-year contract with Baxi Manresa.

On June 16, 2021, he has signed with Medi Bayreuth of the Basketball Bundesliga.

On July 22, 2022, he has signed with Anwil Włocławek of the Polish Basketball League.

On June 24, 2024, he signed with Dziki Warszawa of the Polish Basketball League (PLK).

On July 22, 2026, he signed with Start Lublin of the Polish Basketball League (PLK).

== National team career ==
Jõesaar has represented the Estonian national team since 2014. He represented Estonia in the 2015 Summer Universiade in Gwangju, finishing in eighth place.

== Career statistics ==
Legend
GP	Games played	GS	Games started	MPG	Minutes per game
FG%	Field-goal percentage	3P%	3-point field-goal percentage	FT%	Free-throw percentage
RPG	Rebounds per game	APG	Assists per game	SPG	Steals per game
BPG	Blocks per game	PPG	Points per game	PIR	Performance index rating
**Bold**	Career high

=== College ===
Year	Team	GP	GS	MPG	FG%	3P%	FT%	RPG	APG	SPG	BPG	PPG
2013–14	Ole Miss	12	0	4.3	**.474**	.250	.800	1.5	.1	.3	.0	2.3
2014–15	Texas–Pan American	**31**	**31**	**34.0**	.460	**.378**	**.817**	**6.6**	**2.4**	**1.3**	**.6**	**16.9**
Career		43	31	25.7	.461	.372	.816	5.2	1.8	1.0	.4	12.8

=== Domestic leagues ===
Season	Team	League	GP	MPG	FG%	3P%	FT%	RPG	APG	SPG	BPG	PPG
2015–16	Rakvere Tarvas	KML	28	18.4	.478	.390	.826	5.4	.8	.8	.4	9.5
2016–17	University of Tartu	KML	33	24.8	.468	.318	.773	5.5	1.5	1.3	.6	10.8
2017–18	Kalev/Cramo	KML	24	21.0	.535	.400	.811	4.1	2.1	1.0	.5	9.9
2018–19	Kalev/Cramo	LEBL	17	22.4	.525	.308	.945	4.7	2.2	1.8	.6	11.2
2018–19	Iberostar Tenerife	ACB	6	12.1	.500	.500	.000	2.3	.5	.5	.0	3.0
2019–20	Kalev/Cramo	LEBL	19	19.1	.554	.364	.852	5.3	1.8	1.3	.6	10.5
2020–21	Manresa	ACB	4	14.6	.278	.200	.333	2.3	.3	.8	.3	3.5
2020–21	Kalev/Cramo	LEBL	13	25.5	.522	.435	.846	5.0	1.9	1.2	.3	10.6
2022–23	KK Włocławek	PLK	3	24.7	.526	.545	1.000	6.3	2.3	1.0	.0	9.0
2023–24	KK Włocławek	PLK	30	20.2	.457	.351	.846	5.6	1.1	.8	.1	7.0

=== Estonia national team ===
Year	Tournament	National Team	GP	GS	MPG	FG%	3P%	FT%	RPG	APG	SPG	BPG	PPG
2010	2010 U-18 European Championship Division B	Estonia U-18	8	8	31.5	.465	.200	.684	8.3	.8	1.3	.6	12.3
2011	2011 U-18 European Championship Division B	Estonia U-18	7	7	29.3	.459	.222	.609	6.7	1.7	2.0	.6	12.3
2015	2015 Summer Universiade	Estonia Universiade	7	4	22.0	.417	.385	.615	5.0	1.3	1.4	.1	11.6
2017	2019 Basketball World Cup Pre-Qualifiers	Estonia	1	0	17.0	.500	.333	1.000	3.0	.0	.0	.0	13.0
2018–19	2019 Basketball World Cup Qualification	Estonia	5	3	21.2	.478	.143	.500	5.4	1.6	1.4	.8	5.2
2020–21	EuroBasket 2022 qualification	Estonia	6	6	28.4	.417	.333	.733	4.3	2.2	1.2	.3	7.7
