= Tyler Cheese =

American basketball player (born 1996)

No. 4 – Czarni Słupsk
- Position: Shooting guard
- League: PLK

Personal information
- Born: November 13, 1996 (age 30) Albany, Georgia, U.S.
- Listed height: 6 ft 5 in (1.96 m)
- Listed weight: 202 lb (92 kg)

Career information
- High school: Albany (Albany, Georgia); Combine Academy (Lincolnton, North Carolina)
- College: Florida SouthWestern (2016–2018); Akron (2018–2020)
- NBA draft: 2020: undrafted
- Playing career: 2020–present

Career history
- 2020: Universo Treviso
- 2020: Vilpas Vikings
- 2021: Pelister
- 2021–2022: Team Ehingen Urspring
- 2022–2023: Rapla KK
- 2023–2024: Sokół Łańcut
- 2024: Soles de Santo Domingo
- 2024: Stade Rochelais Basket
- 2024–2025: MKS Dąbrowa Górnicza
- 2025–2026: Bora
- 2026: Panteras de Aguascalientes
- 2026–present: Czarni Słupsk

Career highlights
- Second-team All-MAC (2020); First-team All-Suncoast (2018); Second-team All-Suncoast (2017)

Tyler Cheese (born November 13, 1996) is an American professional basketball player for Czarni Słupsk of the Polish Basketball League (PLK). He played college basketball for Florida SouthWestern and Akron.

== High school career ==
Cheese played three years at Albany High School and led the team to the Class AAAA state tournament as a junior. He transferred to Combine Academy in North Carolina. As a senior, Cheese averaged 17.3 points, 6.6 rebounds, and 5.2 assists per game while shooting 41 percent from behind the three-point arc, earning All-State recognition. In April 2016, he signed with Florida SouthWestern over Florida and Chipola.

== College career ==
In his freshman season at Florida SouthWestern State College, Cheese averaged 10.6 points, 3.5 rebounds and two assists per game, earning Second Team All-Suncoast Conference honors. As a sophomore, he averaged 15.1 points, a team-high 6.6 assists and 5.3 rebounds per game and was named to the First Team All-Suncoast. Cheese scored a career-high 40 points against IMG Academy and recorded the first two triple-doubles in program history. He continued his career at NCAA Division I program Akron. On February 23, 2019, Cheese scored a junior season-high 27 points in a 70–58 win over Miami (Ohio). He averaged 11.1 points, 4.9 rebounds and 2.5 assists per game as a junior. On February 27, 2020, Cheese received a one-game suspension for bumping into an official in a game against Bowling Green. In his senior season, he averaged 15.7 points, 4.8 rebounds and 3.4 assists per game and earned Second Team All-Mid-American Conference honors.

== Professional career ==
On July 8, 2020, Cheese signed his first professional contract with Universo Treviso of the Italian Lega Basket Serie A. He played three games averaging four points per game. On October 26, 2020, Cheese signed with Vilpas Vikings of the Korisliiga. After averaging seven points per game in four games, he requested to leave for personal reasons on November 18. On July 21, 2021, Cheese signed with Pelister of the Macedonian League. Later in 2021, he joined Team Ehingen Urspring of the German ProA.

On September 25, 2024, Cheese signed with Stade Rochelais Basket of the LNB Pro A.

On November 25, 2024, he signed with MKS Dąbrowa Górnicza of the Polish Basketball League (PLK).

On November 9, 2026, he signed with Czarni Słupsk of the Polish Basketball League (PLK).

== Personal life ==
He is the son of Victoria Cheese and has a sister, Shyneshia, and a brother, Deron. His father died when he was five years old.
