= Valmiera Fibreglass =

Company based in Valmiera, Latvia

AS VALMIERAS STIKLA ŠĶIEDRA
- Industry: Manufacturing
- Founded: July 18, 1963
- Headquarters: Cempu iela 13, Valmiera, Latvia
- Number of locations: Valmiera, Latvia; Sherborne, Dorset, United Kingdom
- Area served: Worldwide
- Revenue: 117,796,363 euro (2023)
- Net income: 1,394,004 euro (2023)
- Total assets: 114,932,555 euro (2023)
- Number of employees: 1,274 (2020)
- Parent: VALMIERAS STIKLA ŠĶIEDRA, AS
- Subsidiaries: VALMIERA GLASS UK Ltd.
- Website: valmiera-glass.com

Joint stock company (an abbreviation in Latvian – AS) VALMIERAS STIKLA ŠĶIEDRA is one of the leading European glass fibre manufacturers with almost 60 years’ experience, covering all production stages of glass fibre starting from fiberglass production to finished products. The company is located in Latvia (Valmiera) and together with its subsidiary VALMIERA GLASS UK Ltd. in the United Kingdom forms VALMIERA GLASS GROUP.

== Operation ==
Both companies have long history. 1963 is considered to be the foundation of AS VALMIERAS STIKLA ŠĶIEDRA, when the first glass fibre products were released at the factory. The subsidiary, on the other hand, was set up in the United Kingdom before 1740 (the earliest written evidence).

The core business areas are glass fibre research, glass fibre product development, production and trade, employing around 1270 people. The GROUP’S holding company VALMIERAS STIKLA ŠĶIEDRA, AS specializes in manufacturing glass fibre and glass fibre products using three different types of glass: E-glass with a temperature resistance of 600+°C, HR-glass with a temperature resistance of 800+°C and SiO2-glass with a temperature resistance of 1000+°C. The glass fibre production of VALMIERAS STIKLA ŠĶIEDRA, AS is used for further processing, in technical (electrical, thermal and acoustic) insulation materials and as finished materials in mechanical engineering, construction, and elsewhere.

The British subsidiary VALMIERA GLASS UK Ltd., based in Sherborne, Dorset, produces fiberglass products which are most commonly used for the aviation industry, thermal insulation and architecture. The subsidiary specializes in fiberglass weaving, fabric coating and laminating.

The companies sell its products in more than 50 countries around the world, reaching a total of 96% of total exports. The key sales markets: European Union, North America, CIS and other countries.

The companies operate in accordance with:

- ISO 9001:2015 Quality Management System Standard (Latvian and UK companies);
- ISO 50001:2018 Energy Management Standard (Latvian company);
- ISO 14001:2015 Environment Management Standard (Latvian company);
- ISO 45001:2018 Occupational Health and Safety Management Standard (Latvian company).

Major shareholders of the joint stock company (November 2021): Luxembourg alternative investment company Duke I S.à r.l. (98.05%), P-D Management Industries-Technologies GmbH (0.52%), others (1.43%).
