= Ty Gordon =

American basketball player (born 1998)

No. 0 – Pizza Bulls Bordo Bandırma
- Position: Point guard
- League: BSL

Personal information
- Born: October 20, 1998 (age 28) Tunica, Mississippi, U.S.
- Listed height: 6 ft 1 in (1.85 m)
- Listed weight: 200 lb (91 kg)

Career information
- High school: Horn Lake (Hernando, Mississippi)
- College: Northwest Mississippi CC (2017–2019); Troy (2019–2020); Nicholls (2020–2022)
- NBA draft: 2022: undrafted
- Playing career: 2022–present

Career history
- 2022–2023: BC Gargždai-SC
- 2023: Tartu Ülikool
- 2023–2024: ERA Nymburk
- 2024–2025: Trabzonspor
- 2025–present: Bandırma Bordo Basketbol

Career highlights
- Türkiye Basketbol Ligi champion (2025); KML All-Star Five (2023); Southland Player of the Year (2022); 2x First-team All-Southland (2021, 2022)

Jitaurious Tykyvion Gordon (born October 20, 1998) is an American professional basketball player for Pizza Bulls Bordo Bandırma of the Basketbol Süper Ligi (BSL). He played college basketball player for the Northwest Mississippi Rangers, the Troy Trojans and the Nicholls Colonels.

== High school career ==
Gordon attended Horn Lake High School. As a junior, he scored 50 points against Lake Cormorant High School. Gordon averaged 26.2 points per game as a senior.

== College career ==
Gordon began his college career at Northwest Mississippi Community College, where he was a two-time all-conference selection and averaged 20.6 points per game. He transferred to Troy following his sophomore season. Gordon averaged 12.1 points and 3.2 assists per game as a junior. Following the season, he transferred to Nicholls. As a senior, Gordon averaged 14.6 points, 3.6 rebounds, and 3.7 assists per game, earning First-Team All-Southland honors. On February 17, 2022, he scored a career-high 31 points in an 82–73 win against McNeese State. As a fifth-year senior, Gordon averaged 21.4 points, 3.4 rebounds and 3.1 assists per game. He was named the Southland Player of the Year as well as First Team All-Southland.

== Professional career ==
On October 23, 2022, Gordon joined the Memphis Hustle training camp roster. However, he did not make the final roster.

On December 9, 2022, Gordon signed with BC Gargždai-SC of the Lithuanian Basketball League (LKL).

On October 1, 2023, he signed with ERA Nymburk of the National Basketball League.

On June 17, 2024, he signed with Manisa BB of the Turkish Basketbol Süper Ligi (BSL).

On September 12, 2024, he signed with Trabzonspor of the Türkiye Basketbol Ligi (TBL). He renewed his contract with the team on July 7, 2025, signing a new one-year deal.

On October 30, 2025, he signed with Bandırma Bordo Basketbol of the Türkiye Basketbol Ligi (TBL). On January 7, 2026, Gordon received a Hoops Agents TBL Player of the Week award. He had the game-high 26 points and 9 assists in his team's win.
