= Edon Maxhuni =

Finnish basketball player (born 1998)

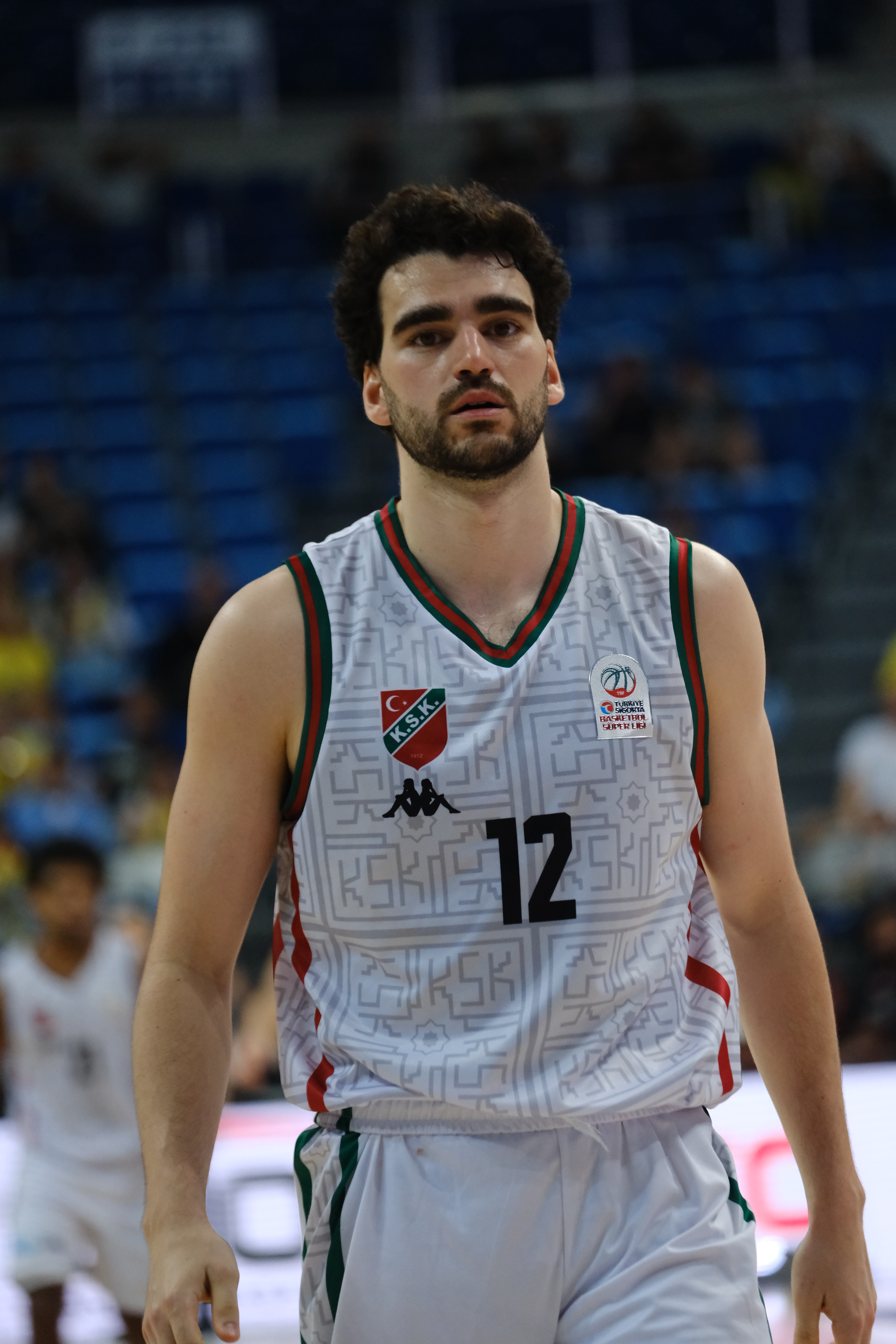
- Maxhuni with Karşıyaka in 2025

No. 5 – Pizza Bulls Bordo Bandırma
- Position: Point guard
- League: BSL

Personal information
- Born: 21 March 1998 (age 28) Hyvinkää, Finland
- Listed height: 1.88 m (6 ft 2 in)

Career information
- High school: Helsinki Basketball Academy (Helsinki, Finland)
- College: Long Beach State (2017–2019)
- NBA draft: 2020: undrafted
- Playing career: 2014–present

Career history
- 2014–2017: HBA-Märsky
- 2019–2020: CB Gran Canaria Claret SAD
- 2020–2021: BC Pärnu
- 2021–2022: Heroes Den Bosch
- 2022–2023: Crailsheim Merlins
- 2023–2024: ESSM Le Portel
- 2024–2025: SIG Strasbourg
- 2025: → Scafati
- 2025: → Karşıyaka
- 2025–2026: BCM Gravelines-Dunkerque
- 2026–present: Bandırma Bordo Basketbol

Career highlights
- BNXT Dutch champion (2022); KML All-Star Five (2021); Finnish Koripallon I-divisioona MVP (2017)

Edon Maxhuni (born 21 March 1998) is a Finnish professional basketball player for Pizza Bulls Bordo Bandırma of the Basketbol Süper Ligi (BSL). He is also part of the Finland national team

== Youth career ==
Maxhuni started playing basketball in a youth team of his hometown club Hyvinkään Ponteva before joining Helsingin NMKY in 2012. Later he was trained at the Helsinki Basketball Academy of the Finnish Basketball Association, and played in the second-tier Koripallon I-divisioona with the academy team HBA-Märsky. At the end of the 2016–17 season, Maxhuni was named the MVP of the Finnish second-tier league.

== College career ==
He left Finland in 2017, to study and play basketball at Long Beach State University in California, United States. Until 2019, the point guard played a total of 67 games for the college team, averaging 6.7 points per game.

== Professional career ==
=== CB Canaria Claret SAD ===
In the 2019/20 season, he was under contract with the Spanish third-division LEB Plata team CB Gran Canaria Claret SAD, playing in 24 league games and averaging 13.3 points per game.

=== Pärnu Sadam ===
Maxhuni signed with Estonian club Pärnu Sadam for the 2020–21 season where he became the Estonian vice-champion. In 2021, he was also named in the All-KML Team in Estonian Korvpalli Meistriliiga.

=== Heroes Den Bosch ===
In the 2021–22 season, Maxhuni played for the Heroes Den Bosch in the BNXT League and the FIBA Europe Cup, and in 2022, as the team's top scorer, won the Dutch championship title.

=== Crailsheim Merlins ===
In September 2022, Maxhuni accepted an offer from Crailsheim Merlins of the Basketball Bundesliga and the FIBA Europe Cup. During the season, he averaged 11.8 points and 3.9 assists per game.

=== Le Portel ===
On 8 October 2023, Maxhuni signed with ESSM Le Portel of the French LNB Pro A on a short contract as an injury replacement, with an option to extend. Since his arrival, Le Portel managed to change their trajectory and won seven out of ten games played, after having started the season with five losses and only one win. On 22 December 2023, his contract was extended for the rest of the ongoing 2023–24 season. At the end of the season, Maxhuni helped Le Portel to qualify for the LNB Elite Playoffs, for the first time since 2017. He finished his first season in French league averaging 10.9 points and 3.7 assists per game.

=== SIG Strasbourg ===
On 18 July 2024, Maxhuni signed with fellow French team SIG Strasbourg on a two-year deal.

==== Scafati ====
In January 2025, he joined Italian Scafati on a loan contract for the remainder of the season.

==== Karşıyaka ====
After Scafati's relegation was confirmed, on April 24, 2025, he signed with Karşıyaka Basket of the Basketbol Süper Ligi (BSL).

=== BCM Gravelines-Dunkerque ===
On August 7, 2025, Maxhuni signed with French team BCM Gravelines-Dunkerque.

=== Bandırma Bordo ===
On September 20, 2026, he signed with Bandırma Bordo Basketbol of the Basketbol Süper Ligi (BSL).

== National team career ==
Maxhuni received an offer to play for the Kosovo national basketball team but declined, since he was a Finnish youth national player at the time. He participated in events such as the 2014 FIBA U16 EuroBasket and the FIBA U18 EuroBasket in 2015 and 2016.

Since 2020, Maxhuni has been part of the Finland national basketball team. During the EuroBasket 2022, he averaged 8.9 points per game in seven tournament matches. Maxhuni was named in the Finland squad in the 2023 FIBA World Cup, averaging 7.2 points and 3.8 assists per game in five matches. Maxhuni played also in the 2024 FIBA Olympic qualifying tournament, averaging 12.7 points and 4.7 assists in three games against Bahamas, Poland and Spain. As of 7 July 2024, Maxhuni has played 53 official games with the senior national team.

== Personal life ==
Maxhuni's parents are ethnic Albanians from Mitrovica, Kosovo, who moved to Finland in 1992. His father, Besim Maxhuni, played basketball for Trepça and Prishtina, and later became a coach, currently coaching Raiders Basket in the Koripallon I-divisioona in Finnish second-tier. His grandfather Hysni Maxhuni is a well-known Kosovan football coach.

== Career statistics ==
Legend
GP	Games played	GS	Games started	MPG	Minutes per game
FG%	Field goal percentage	3P%	3-point field goal percentage	FT%	Free throw percentage
RPG	Rebounds per game	APG	Assists per game	SPG	Steals per game
BPG	Blocks per game	PPG	Points per game	**Bold**	Career high

=== Domestic leagues ===
Year	Team	League	GP	MPG	FG%	3P%	FT%	RPG	APG	SPG	BPG	PPG
2013–14	(Finland) HBA-Märsky	I-divisioona	7	21.3	.262	.103	.857	1.7	1.4	1.0	–	6.1
2014–15	(Finland) HBA-Märsky	I-divisioona	19	25.3	.486	.376	.818	2.8	2.4	1.1	.1	17.9
2015–16	(Finland) HBA-Märsky	I-divisioona	24	28.9	.431	.401	.786	2.6	3.5	.7	–	18.9
2016–17	(Finland) HBA-Märsky	I-divisioona	27	32.2	.451	.345	.842	2.7	3.7	1.0	.1	23.8
2019–20	(Spain) Gran Canaria B	LEB Plata	24	22.7	.413	.294	.849	2.2	3.3	.6	.1	13.3
2020–21	(Estonia) Pärnu Sadam	KML	6	21.8	.492	.533	.952	1.3	3.8	.7	–	16.0
2020–21	(Estonia) Pärnu Sadam	LEBL	23	29.1	.420	.390	.907	1.8	5.0	1.1	–	17.3
2021–22	(Netherlands) Heroes Den Bosch	BNXT	27	27.2	.441	.397	.872	2.3	5.0	1.2	–	13.6
2022–23	(Germany) Crailsheim Merlins	BBL	33	22.3	.399	.329	.892	1.3	3.9	.7	–	11.8
2023–24	(France) Le Portel	LNB Élite	26	28.2	.391	.396	.865	1.4	3.7	.8	–	10.9
2024–25	(France) SIG Strasbourg	LNB Élite	14	23.8	.358	.388	.838	1.4	3.2	.6	–	11.1
2024–25	(Italy) Scafati	LBA	10	21.4	.414	.390	.875	1.2	2.2	.2	–	11.6
2024–25	(Turkey) Karşıyaka	TBSL	4	27.3	.417	.556	.500	2.0	2.5	1.0	–	14.0

=== College ===
Year	Team	GP	GS	MPG	FG%	3P%	FT%	RPG	APG	SPG	BPG	PPG
2017–18	Long Beach State	33	**15**	**17.3**	.385	.386	**.939**	**1.7**	1.0	**.4**	–	6.2
2018–19	Long Beach State	**34**	10	17.0	**.386**	**.408**	.875	.9	**1.1**	.2	–	**7.2**
Career		67	25	17.1	.386	.399	.904	1.3	1.0	.3	–	6.7

=== National team ===
Team	Tournament	Pos.	GP	PPG	RPG	APG
Finland	EuroBasket 2022	7th	7	8.9	1.9	3.9
Finland	2023 FIBA World Cup	21st	5	7.2	0.8	3.8
Finland	EuroBasket 2025	4th	9	7.7	0.9	2.4
