= Hugo Toom =

Estonian basketball player

No. 44 – Astoria Bydgoszcz
- Position: Small forward
- League: PLK

Personal information
- Born: 25 October 2002 (age 24) Tallinn, Estonia
- Listed height: 2.00 m (6 ft 7 in)
- Listed weight: 103 kg (227 lb)

Career history
- 2017–2019: Viimsi
- 2017–2019: →Viimsi/Kesklinn
- 2019–2020: Audentes
- 2020–2022: BC Pärnu
- 2022–2026: BC Kalev
- 2026–present: Astoria Bydgoszcz

Career highlights
- 4x Estonian League champion (2022, 2023, 2024, 2025); 3× Estonian Cup winner (2022, 2024, 2025); Latvian–Estonian League All-Star Five (2026); 3× KML All-Star Five (2023, 2025, 2026); Estonian Cup MVP (2022); KML Best Young Player (2021)

Hugo Toom (born 25 October 2002) is an Estonian professional basketball player for Astoria Bydgoszcz of the Polish Basketball League (PLK). Standing at 2.00 m (6 ft 7 in), he plays at the small forward position.

== Professional career ==
On 22 July 2020, Toom signed with Pärnu Sadam of the Estonian-Latvian Basketball League. At the conclusion of the 2020–21 season, he was named the KML Best Young Player. Toom spent most of the 2021–22 season injured, as Pärnu Sadam claimed its first Estonian League championship title.

On 23 June 2022, Toom signed with BC Kalev/Cramo on a two-year contract.

On November 8, 2026, he signed with Astoria Bydgoszcz of the Polish Basketball League (PLK).

== National team career ==
Toom made his debut for the Estonian national team on 11 November 2022, in a 2023 FIBA Basketball World Cup qualifier against Sweden.

== Awards and accomplishments ==
- Estonian League champion: 2022, 2023
- Estonian Cup MVP: 2022
- Estonian League Best Young Player: 2021

== Career statistics ==
Legend
GP	Games played	GS	Games started	MPG	Minutes per game
FG%	Field-goal percentage	3P%	3-point field-goal percentage	FT%	Free-throw percentage
RPG	Rebounds per game	APG	Assists per game	SPG	Steals per game
BPG	Blocks per game	PPG	Points per game	PIR	Performance index rating
**Bold**	Career high

=== Domestic leagues ===
Season	Team	League	GP	MPG	FG%	3P%	FT%	RPG	APG	SPG	BPG	PPG
2022–23	(Estonia) BC Kalev	LEBL	28	20.3	.439	.256	.633	3.3	1.0	.4	.7	10.0
2023–24	(Estonia) BC Kalev	LEBL	10	22.5	.372	.167	.717	3.2	1.4	.6	.3	9.9
