= 2021–22 KML season =

Estonian basketball championships

PAF Korvpalli Meistriliiga^{1}
- Season: 2021–22
- Duration: 1 October 2021 – 24 April 2022 (regular season); 26 April 2022 – 26 May 2022 (Play-offs)
- Teams: 8

Regular season
- Top seed: BC Kalev/Cramo

Finals
- Champions: Pärnu Sadam
- Runners-up: Tartu Ülikool Maks & Moorits
- Third place: Kalev/Cramo
- Fourth place: TalTech/Optibet
- ^{1}Sponsored league name, referring to PAF.

The 2021–22 Korvpalli Meistriliiga (KML) season, also known as PAF Korvpalli Meistriliiga for sponsorship reasons, was the 96th season of the top-tier basketball league in Estonia. The regular season began on 1 October 2021 and finished on 24 April 2022. The play-offs started on 26 April and finished on 26 May with Pärnu Sadam winning their first KML title.

== Teams ==
=== Venues and locations ===
Location of teams in 2021–22 Korvpalli Meistriliiga

Team	Home city	Arena	Capacity
AVIS UTILITAS Rapla	Rapla	Sadolin Sports Hall	958
BC Kalev/Cramo	Tallinn	Kalev Sports Hall	1,700
KK Viimsi/Sportland	Haabneeme	Forus Sports Centre	500
Pärnu Sadam	Pärnu	Pärnu Sports Hall	1,820
Rakvere Tarvas	Rakvere	Rakvere Sports Hall	2,747
Tallinna Kalev	Tallinn	Nord Cramo Sports Hall	980
Tallinna Kalev	Tallinn	Sõle Sports Centre	153
TalTech/OPTIBET	Tallinn	TalTech Sports Hall	1,000
Tartu Ülikool Maks & Moorits	Tartu	University of Tartu Sports Hall	2,600

=== Personnel and sponsorship ===
Team	Head coach	Captain	Kit manufacturer	Shirt sponsor
AVIS UTILITAS Rapla	(Spain) Lluís Riera	(Estonia) Sven Kaldre	Spalding	Hepa
BC Kalev/Cramo	(Latvia) Roberts Štelmahers	(Estonia) Martin Dorbek	Nike	Unibet
KK Viimsi/Sportland	(Estonia) Valdo Lips	(Estonia) Rain Veideman	Nike	Sportland
Pärnu Sadam	(Estonia) Heiko Rannula	(Estonia) Mihkel Kirves	Nike	Betsafe
Rakvere Tarvas	(Estonia) Martin Müürsepp	(Estonia) Sten Saaremäel	Spalding	Rakvere
Tallinna Kalev	(Estonia) Brett Nõmm	(Estonia) Mario Paiste	Nike	Tallinn
TalTech/OPTIBET	(Estonia) Alar Varrak	(Estonia) Tanel Sokk	Nike	
Tartu Ülikool Maks & Moorits	(Latvia) Nikolajs Mazurs	(Lithuania) Adomas Drungilas	Spalding	Maks & Moorits

=== Coaching changes ===
Team	2020–21 season	2021–22 season
Off-season
AVIS UTILITAS Rapla	(Estonia) Toomas Annuk	(Spain) Lluís Riera
KK Viimsi/Sportland	(Estonia) Martin Toomas	(Estonia) Valdo Lips
Rakvere Tarvas	(Latvia) Juris Umbraško	(Estonia) Martin Müürsepp
Tallinna Kalev	(Estonia) Valdo Lips	(Estonia) Brett Nõmm
TalTech/OPTIBET	(Estonia) Kris Killing	(Estonia) Alar Varrak
In-season
Tartu Ülikool Maks & Moorits	(Estonia) Toomas Kandimaa	(Latvia) Nikolajs Mazurs

== Regular season ==
In the regular season, teams played against each other once, with all results from the regular season of the 2021–22 Estonian-Latvian Basketball League being carried over.

=== League table ===
Pos	Team	Pld	W	L	PF	PA	PD	PCT	Qualification
1	BC Kalev/Cramo	33	28	5	2824	2174	+650	.848	Qualification to semifinals
2	TalTech/OPTIBET	33	22	11	2701	2528	+173	.667	Qualification to quarterfinals
3	KK Viimsi/Sportland	33	21	12	2609	2575	+34	.636	Qualification to quarterfinals
4	Pärnu Sadam	33	20	13	2762	2541	+221	.606	Qualification to quarterfinals
5	AVIS UTILITAS Rapla	33	14	19	2687	2770	−83	.424	Qualification to quarterfinals
6	Tartu Ülikool Maks & Moorits	33	14	19	2521	2630	−109	.424	Qualification to quarterfinals
7	Tallinna Kalev	33	7	26	2323	2921	−598	.212	Qualification to quarterfinals
8	Rakvere Tarvas	33	5	28	2403	2970	−567	.152	

Source: Korvpalli Meistriliiga

=== Results ===
Home \ Away	RAP	KAL	VMS	PÄR	TRV	TLK	TCH	TRT
AVIS UTILITAS Rapla	—	—	66–88	—	79–69	—	—	77–76
BC Kalev/Cramo	85–78	—	—	—	95–60	108–77	—	—
KK Viimsi/Sportland	—	71–85	—	92–85	—	—	77–62	—
Pärnu Sadam	79–72	64–91	—	—	—	107–76	90–73	—
Rakvere Tarvas	—	—	82–93	62–109	—	—	—	89–98
Tallinna Kalev	84–64	—	87–81	—	88–69	—	—	80–92
TalTech/OPTIBET	89–87	78–84	—	—	93–72	74–68	—	84–80
Tartu Ülikool Maks & Moorits	—	58–87	83–87	89–91	—	—	—	—

Source: Korvpalli Meistriliiga
Legend: Blue = home team win; Red = away team win.

== Playoffs ==
Playoffs series are best-of-five. The first team to win three games wins the series.

Quarterfinals
1	Kalev/Cramo
none
4	Pärnu Sadam	3
5	Avis Utilitas Rapla	1
2	TalTech/Optibet	3
7	Tallinna Kalev	1
3	Viimsi/Sportland	1
6	Tartu Ülikool Maks & Moorits	3

Semifinals
1	Kalev/Cramo	2
4	Pärnu Sadam	3
2	TalTech/Optibet	0
6	Tartu Ülikool Maks & Moorits	3

Finals
4	Pärnu Sadam	3
6	Tartu Ülikool Maks & Moorits	0
Third place
1	Kalev/Cramo	3
2	TalTech/Optibet	0

== See also ==
- 2021–22 Estonian-Latvian Basketball League
- 2021–22 VTB United League
- 2021–22 Basketball Champions League
- 2021–22 FIBA Europe Cup
