= Leemet Böckler =

Estonian professional basketball player

No. 11 – Górnik Wałbrzych
- Position: Shooting guard
- League: PLK

Personal information
- Born: 7 April 2001 (age 25) Tallinn, Estonia
- Listed height: 1.98 m (6 ft 6 in)
- Listed weight: 98 kg (216 lb)

Career information
- College: Saint Mary's (2020–2022)
- NBA draft: 2023: undrafted
- Playing career: 2018–present

Career history
- 2018–2019: Tallinna Kalev
- 2019–2020: TalTech
- 2022–2023: Tartu Ülikool
- 2023–2025: Kalev
- 2025–2026: Krosno
- 2026–present: Górnik Wałbrzych

Career highlights
- 2× Estonian League champion (2024, 2025); 2× Estonian Cup winner (2024, 2025)

Leemet Böckler (né Loik; born 7 April 2001) is an Estonian professional basketball player for Górnik Wałbrzych of the Polish Basketball League (PLK). Standing at 1.98 m (6 ft 5 in), he plays at the shooting guard position. Böckler played college basketball for the Saint Mary's Gaels.

== Professional career ==
After returning from America Böckler joined Tartu Ülikool. He finished the Korvpalli Meistriliiga season in second place and the Estonian-Latvian Basketball League 2022–23 season in third place.

For the 2023–24 season he signed a contract with BC Kalev. Kalev finished the Estonian-Latvian Basketball League as a runner-up and became champions of Korvpalli Meistriliiga 2023–24 season. Böckler extended his contract with Kalev for the 2024–25 season.

On June 12, 2025, he signed with Miasto Szkła Krosno of the Polish Basketball League (PLK).

On June 1, 2026, he signed with Górnik Wałbrzych of the Polish Basketball League (PLK).

== Career statistics ==
Legend
GP	Games played	GS	Games started	MPG	Minutes per game
FG%	Field-goal percentage	3P%	3-point field-goal percentage	FT%	Free-throw percentage
RPG	Rebounds per game	APG	Assists per game	SPG	Steals per game
BPG	Blocks per game	PPG	Points per game	PIR	Performance index rating
**Bold**	Career high

=== Domestic leagues ===
Season	Team	League	GP	MPG	FG%	3P%	FT%	RPG	APG	SPG	BPG	PPG
2018–19	(Estonia) Tallinna Kalev	LEBL	26	21.8	.420	.410	.820	3.1	1.1	.9	.5	7.4
2019–20	(Estonia) TalTech	LEBL	26	22.5	.439	.405	.957	3.4	2.0	1.0	.7	13.5
2022–23	(Estonia) Tartu Ülikool	LEBL	26	24.1	.401	.361	.763	3.7	2.0	.5	.5	9.9
2023–24	(Estonia) BC Kalev	LEBL	36	20.3	.473	.383	.852	4.0	1.5	.6	.3	8.8

=== College ===
Year	Team	GP	GS	MPG	FG%	3P%	FT%	RPG	APG	SPG	BPG	PPG
2020–21	Saint Mary's	8	0	**11.0**	**.441**	**.423**	**1.000**	**1.5**	.1	.1	**.3**	**5.5**
2021–22	Saint Mary's	**12**	0	4.0	.409	.385	-	.8	**.3**	**.2**	.0	1.9
Career		20	0	6.8	.429	.410	1.000	1.1	.2	.2	.1	3.4
