= Robert Valge =

Estonian basketball player

No. 2 – Tartu Ülikool
- Position: Shooting guard
- League: Korvpalli Meistriliiga; Latvian–Estonian Basketball League

Personal information
- Born: 20 April 1997 (age 29) Tallinn, Estonia
- Listed height: 1.92 m (6 ft 4 in)
- Listed weight: 82 kg (181 lb)

Career history
- 2014–2016: BC Pärnu
- 2016–2017: Palencia
- 2016–2017: →Baloncesto Venta de Baños
- 2017–2019: San Pablo Burgos
- 2017: →Plasencia Extremadura
- 2017–2019: →Grupo de Automoción Santiago
- 2019–2020: Tartu Ülikool
- 2020–2025: BC Pärnu
- 2025–present: Tartu Ülikool

Career highlights
- Estonian League champion (2026); Estonian Cup winner (2026); KML All-Star Five (2022); Latvian–Estonian League All-Star Five (2022)

Robert Valge (born 20 April 1997) is an Estonian professional basketball player who plays for Tartu Ülikool of the Latvian-Estonian Basketball League. He is a 1.92 m (6 ft 4 in) tall shooting guard.

== Professional career ==
Valge began playing basketball with BC Pärnu in the Estonian League. He moved to Spain in 2016 and played one season for Palencia of the LEB Oro league and their Liga EBA affiliate team Baloncesto Venta de Baños. In 2017 Valge signed with Liga ACB team San Pablo Burgos, but played mostly for their Liga EBA affiliate team Grupo de Automoción Santiago. In 2017 he spent a three-month loan spell in LEB Plata team Plasencia Extremadura. In 2019 he moved back to native Estonia to play for University of Tartu basketball team.

== Career statistics ==
Legend
GP	Games played	GS	Games started	MPG	Minutes per game
FG%	Field-goal percentage	3P%	3-point field-goal percentage	FT%	Free-throw percentage
RPG	Rebounds per game	APG	Assists per game	SPG	Steals per game
BPG	Blocks per game	PPG	Points per game	PIR	Performance index rating
**Bold**	Career high

=== Domestic leagues ===
Season	Team	League	GP	MPG	FG%	3P%	FT%	RPG	APG	SPG	BPG	PPG
2014–15	BC Pärnu	KML	31	14.7	.370	.342	.471	.8	.7	.3	.1	4.7
2015–16	BC Pärnu	KML	33	25.0	.386	.292	.743	1.9	1.3	.6	.1	10.0
2016–17	Palencia	LEB Oro	15	1.4	.333	.500	1.000	.1	.0	.0	.0	.5
2016–17	Baloncesto Venta de Baños	Liga EBA	24	32.5	.531	.407	.728	2.8	1.9	1.0	.1	21.5
2017–18	Plasencia Extremadura	LEB Plata	13	14.8	.339	.303	.778	1.3	.5	.1	.1	4.4
2017–18	Grupo de Automoción Santiago	Liga EBA	16	29.2	.506	.296	.703	2.9	1.3	.9	.0	19.5
2018–19	San Pablo Burgos	Liga ACB	4	1.6	.333	.000	–	.0	.0	.3	.0	.5
2018–19	Grupo de Automoción Santiago	Liga EBA	26	31.5	.486	.361	.808	3.0	2.4	.9	.2	23.4
2019–20	University of Tartu	LEBL	21	33.2	.454	.407	.821	2.6	2.7	.9	.1	17.9

=== Estonia national team ===
Year	Tournament	National Team	GP	GS	MPG	FG%	3P%	FT%	RPG	APG	SPG	BPG	PPG
2013	2013 FIBA Europe Under-16 Championship Division B	Estonia U-16	9	9	37.6	.436	.333	.639	4.1	1.3	1.3	.1	18.2
2014	2014 FIBA Europe Under-18 Championship Division B	Estonia U-18	7	5	25.1	.444	.391	.500	2.4	1.4	.7	.6	12.3
2015	2015 FIBA Europe Under-18 Championship Division B	Estonia U-18	9	9	27.4	.422	.340	.619	1.6	1.0	.9	.3	14.2
