= Saimon Sutt =

Estonian basketball player

No. 10 – TalTech
- Position: Shooting guard
- League: Korvpalli Meistriliiga; Latvian-Estonian Basketball League European North Basketball League

Personal information
- Born: 12 April 1995 (age 31) Tartu, Estonia
- Listed height: 2.00 m (6 ft 7 in)
- Listed weight: 92 kg (203 lb)

Career information
- Playing career: 2009–present

Career history
- 2009–2010: Salva Tartu
- 2012–2016: Tartu Ülikool
- 2010–2011: →University of Tartu Juniors
- 2011–2016: →University of Tartu II
- 2016–2019: BC Pärnu
- 2019–2020: Oberwart Gunners
- 2020–2022: Rapla KK
- 2022: KR
- 2023–2024: BC Pärnu
- 2024–2025: Keila Basket
- 2025–present: TalTech

Career highlights
- Estonian League champion (2015); 2× Estonian Cup winner (2013, 2014)

Saimon Sutt (born 12 April 1995) is an Estonian professional basketball player who plays for TalTech of the Latvian-Estonian Basketball League. Standing at 2.00 m (6 ft 7 in), he plays at the small forward position.

== Professional career ==
Sutt began playing basketball with the youth teams of Salva Tartu, before moving to University of Tartu. He made his debut in the Korvpalli Meistriliiga (KML) in the 2012–13 season. In 2015, Sutt won his first KML championship.

On 20 July 2016, Sutt signed with BC Pärnu.

In September 2022, Sutt signed with KR of the Úrvalsdeild karla. He was released by the club in end of November after appearing in four games.

In January 2023 he rejoined BC Pärnu.

== National team career ==
Sutt made his debut for the Estonian national team on 13 September 2018, in a 2019 FIBA Basketball World Cup European qualifier against Germany.

== Awards and accomplishments ==
=== Professional career ===
University of Tartu

- Estonian League champion: 2015
- 2× Estonian Cup champion: 2013, 2014
