= Martin Dorbek =

Estonian professional basketball player

No. 22 – BC Kalev
- Position: Shooting guard
- League: Korvpalli Meistriliiga; Latvian–Estonian Basketball League

Personal information
- Born: 21 January 1991 (age 35) Tallinn, Estonia
- Listed height: 6 ft 4 in (1.93 m)
- Listed weight: 191 lb (87 kg)

Career information
- Playing career: 2008–present

Career history
- 2008–2009: Kuremaa
- 2009–present: BC Kalev
- 2010–2012: →Rakvere Tarvas (loan)
- 2012–2014: →Rapla (loan)

Career highlights
- 8× Estonian League champion (2016, 2017, 2018, 2019, 2021, 2023, 2024, 2025); 5× Estonian Cup (2015, 2016, 2020, 2024, 2025); Estonian League Best Defender (2013)
Medals
Men's basketball
Representing Estonia
FIBA Europe U-20 Championship Division B
| Silver medal – second place | 2011 Bosnia and Herzegovina | U20 Team |

Martin Dorbek (born 21 January 1991) is an Estonian professional basketball player. He is currently playing for BC Kalev. He comes from basketball family: father Allan Dorbek is a basketball coach, brothers Erik Dorbek and Karl-Peeter Dorbek are both Estonian champions. Another basketball player Gert Dorbek is Allan's uncle's descendant.

== Club career ==
Martin Dorbek started his basketball career in BC Kalev/Cramo youth system and went on to make his debut in Korvpalli Meistriliiga at the age of 17 with Kuremaa SK. After a season with bottom-finished club he rejoined BC Kalev/Cramo, but played only episodic role in their disappointing third place appearance in the 2009-2010 KML season. Since 2010 he has been playing for BC Rakvere Tarvas, with whom he reached the Estonian Cup and Baltic League Challenge Cup finals in 2011 and 2012, respectively and claimed his second KML bronze medal in addition to personal achievements as he was chosen to the All-KML Defensive teams two years in a row.

=== BC Kalev/Cramo ===
On 18 June 2012 it was announced that Dorbek will return from a loan spell and play for BC Kalev/Cramo.

== International career ==
In 2011, after successful breakthrough season he was included in the shortlist of Estonia national basketball team and also Estonian U20 team. With the latter, they managed to get promoted to the FIBA Europe Under-20 Championship A division, defeating Belgium U20 on their way to the final, only to lose to strong Georgian team.

== Honours ==
=== Club ===
- Korvpalli Meistriliiga: 2015–16, 2016–17, 2017–18, 2018–19
- Estonian Basketball Cup: 2015, 2016, 2020

=== Individual ===
- KML Best Defender: 2013

== Career statistics ==
=== Domestic leagues ===
| Season | Team | League | GP | MPG | FG% | 3P% | FT% | RPG | APG | SPG | BPG | PPG |
|---|---|---|---|---|---|---|---|---|---|---|---|---|
| 2008–09 | Kuremaa | KML | 9 | 26.7 | .413 | .304 | .714 | 2.7 | 2.2 | 1.4 | .1 | 6.3 |
| 2009–10 | Kalev/Cramo | KML | 12 | 9.3 | .111 | .125 | .750 | 1.3 | .3 | .6 | .0 | .8 |
| 2010–11 | Rakvere Tarvas | KML | 41 | 26.7 | .393 | .347 | .655 | 2.7 | 2.3 | 1.9 | .1 | 4.5 |
| 2011–12 | Rakvere Tarvas | KML | 34 | 28.1 | .386 | .308 | .712 | 2.8 | 3.4 | 1.9 | .0 | 8.1 |
| 2012–13 | TYCO Rapla | KML | 29 | 27.2 | .423 | .344 | .500 | 3.1 | 2.3 | 2.2 | .0 | 7.7 |
| 2013–14 | TYCO Rapla | KML | 33 | 28.3 | .399 | .277 | .686 | 4.6 | 2.6 | 2.3 | .1 | 8.4 |
| 2014–15 | Kalev/Cramo | KML | 25 | 21.0 | .423 | .321 | .888 | 3.4 | 3.6 | 2.0 | .0 | 6.7 |
| 2015–16 | Kalev/Cramo | KML | 28 | 22.6 | .443 | .327 | .812 | 2.6 | 2.3 | 1.8 | .1 | 5.5 |
| 2016–17 | Kalev/Cramo | KML | 25 | 19.0 | .507 | .435 | .400 | 2.4 | 2.0 | 1.4 | .0 | 7.2 |
| 2017–18 | Kalev/Cramo | KML | 31 | 23.6 | .493 | .394 | .607 | 2.7 | 2.3 | 1.6 | .1 | 8.8 |
