= Mihkel Kirves =

Estonian basketball player (born 1996)

No. 8 – BC Pärnu
- Position: Power forward / Center
- League: Korvpalli Meistriliiga; Estonian-Latvian Basketball League; Europe Cup

Personal information
- Born: 6 December 1996 (age 29) Tallinn, Estonia
- Listed height: 2.00 m (6 ft 7 in)
- Listed weight: 105 kg (231 lb)

Career information
- NBA draft: 2018: undrafted
- Playing career: 2012–present

Career history
- 2012–2019: BC Pärnu
- 2012–2014: → Pärnu II
- 2019–2020: Patrioti Levice
- 2019–2020: Brno
- 2020–2023: BC Pärnu
- 2023–2024: BC Kalev
- 2024: M Basket Mažeikiai
- 2024–2026: BC Jonava
- 2026–present: BC Pärnu

Career highlights
- 2× Estonian League champion (2022, 2024); Estonian Cup winner (2024); 2× KML All-Star Five (2022, 2023); 3× KML Best Defender (2017, 2018, 2019)

Mihkel Kirves (born 6 December 1996) is an Estonian professional basketball player for BC Pärnu of the Estonian Korvpalli Meistriliiga (KML). Standing at 2.00 m (6 ft 7 in), he plays at the small forward position.

== Professional career ==
Kirves debuted in the Korvpalli Meistriliiga (KML) in the 2012–13 season with BC Pärnu. He was named KML Best Defender in 2017 and 2018.

He left Estonia for the first time on June 30, 2019, when he signed with Levickí Patrioti of the Slovak Basketball League (SBL).

In January 2020, Kirves and Levickí Patrioti mutually decided to terminate his contract and he shortly joined Basket Brno of the National Basketball League.

Kirves returned to BC Pärnu in June 2020.

On August 1, 2023, he signed a one-year contract with BC Kalev of the Korvpalli Meistriliiga (KML). In early 2024 he injured his knee and had knee surgery, making him unfit to play till the end of the season.

On 9 July 2024, Kirves signed with M Basket Mažeikiai of the Lithuanian Basketball League (LKL).

His contract was terminated by mutual agreement with M Basket Mažeikiai and on October 9, 2024, he signed with CBet Jonava of the Lithuanian Basketball League for the rest of the season. Kirves re-signed with Jonava Hipocredit for the 2025–2026 season on August 7, 2025.

== National team career ==
Kirves made his debut for the Estonian national team on 13 September 2018, in a 2019 FIBA Basketball World Cup European qualifier against Germany, scoring 2 points in a 43–86 home defeat.

== Awards and accomplishments ==
=== Individual ===
- 2× Estonian League Best Defender: 2017, 2018
