= Rapla KK =

Estonian basketball club

Hepa Rapla
- Leagues: I liiga
- Founded: 2004; 22 years ago
- History: Rapla KK (2004–present)
- Arena: Sadolin Sports Hall
- Capacity: 958
- Location: Rapla, Estonia
- Team colors: White, Pink
- Team manager: Sven Kaldre
- Head coach: Kustas Põldoja
- Website: raplakk.ee
Home	Away

Rapla KK, also known as Hepa Rapla for sponsorship reasons, is a professional basketball team based in Rapla, Estonia. The team plays in the Saku I liiga. Their home arena is the Sadolin Sports Hall.

== History ==
The origins of the team can be traced back to Korvpalliklubi Rapla (Basketball Club Rapla), which was founded in 1996 as a division of the Rapla Sports School. Rapla Korvpallikool (Rapla Basketball School) was founded in 2004. In 2010, they moved to the newly built Sadolin Sports Hall and Rapla's first team joined the Korvpalli Meistriliiga (KML), the top tier of Estonian basketball. The team also joined the Challenge Cup competition of the Baltic Basketball League (BBL) for the 2011–12 season. TYCO Rapla reached the Estonian Cup final in 2012, but were defeated by BC Rakvere Tarvas.

Coached by Aivar Kuusmaa, the team finished third in the Estonian League in 2015 and 2016. AVIS UTILITAS Rapla made it to the KML Finals for the first time in 2017, but were swept in four games by defending champion BC Kalev/Cramo. They came third again in the 2017–18 season.

In 2018, the Estonian-Latvian Basketball League was formed. AVIS UTILITAS Rapla reached the playoffs in the league's inaugural season, where they lost to VEF Riga in the quarterfinals.

On 30 June 2025, Rapla announced that they will withdraw from the top flight and play in the I liiga.

== Sponsorship naming ==
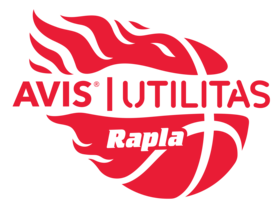
Rapla logo from 2017 to 2024

- Piimameister Otto/Rapla: 2010–2012
- TYCO Rapla: 2012–2015
- AVIS Rapla: 2015–2017
- AVIS UTILITAS Rapla: 2017–2024
- Utilitas Rapla: 2024–2025
- Hepa Rapla: 2025–present

== Home arenas ==
- Rapla Sports Hall (2008–2009)
- Alu Sports Hall (2009–2010)
- Sadolin Sports Hall (2010–present)

== Players ==
=== Current roster ===
Note: Flags indicate national team eligibility at FIBA-sanctioned events. Players may hold other non-FIBA nationalities not displayed.

Hepa Rapla roster
Players
Coaches

Pos.	No.	Nat.	Name	Ht.	Wt.	Age
PG	0	(United States)	McKissic, Brandon	1.85 m (6 ft 1 in)	85 kg (187 lb)	27 – 20 January 1999
PF	1	(United States)	McCreary, Jalyn	2.01 m (6 ft 7 in)	99 kg (218 lb)	25 – 19 September 2000
SG	3	(Estonia)	Jakk, Rasmus	1.92 m (6 ft 4 in)		20 – 12 December 2005
PG	4	(Estonia)	Laane, Rait-Riivo	1.79 m (5 ft 10 in)	78 kg (172 lb)	33 – 24 May 1993
SF	5	(Estonia)	Eelmäe, Hendrik (C)	1.98 m (6 ft 6 in)	95 kg (209 lb)	25 – 26 October 2000
SG	6	(Estonia)	Ratas, Jan Märten	1.95 m (6 ft 5 in)	75 kg (165 lb)	25 – 7 September 2001
PG	7	(Latvia)	Emīls Krūmiņš	1.85 m (6 ft 1 in)	78 kg (172 lb)	24 – 10 October 2001
SG	8	(Estonia)	Ruubel, Markus	1.88 m (6 ft 2 in)	82 kg (181 lb)	24 – 8 February 2002
C	11	(Canada)	Ezeagu, Kaosi	2.08 m (6 ft 10 in)		26 – 26 November 1999
SF	19	(Estonia)	Niits, Tormi	1.98 m (6 ft 6 in)	94 kg (207 lb)	28 – 19 May 1998
PF	22	(Estonia)	Kajupank, Indrek	2.00 m (6 ft 7 in)	98 kg (216 lb)	38 – 15 May 1988
PF	32	(Estonia)	Kilk, Karmo	1.94 m (6 ft 4 in)	88 kg (194 lb)	21 – 23 January 2005
SG	33	(Estonia)	Ruut, Marek	1.98 m (6 ft 6 in)	86 kg (190 lb)	28 – 2 April 1998

Head coach

- (Estonia) Indrek Ruut

Assistant coach(es)

- (Estonia) Kustas Põldoja

Legend

- (C) Team captain
- Injured

- Roster
Updated: 31 October 2023

=== Depth chart ===
Pos.	Starting 5	Bench 1	Bench 2
C	Kaosi Ezeagu
PF	Jalyn McCreary	Indrek Kajupank
SF	Tormi Niits	Hendrik Eelmäe
SG	Brandon McKissic	Jan Märten Ratas	Marek Ruut
PG	Emīls Krūmiņš	Rait-Riivo Laane	Markus Ruubel

== Head coaches ==
- (Estonia) Indrek Ruut 2008–2014, 2025–2026
- (Estonia) Aivar Kuusmaa 2014–2018
- (Estonia) Toomas Annuk 2019–2021
- (Spain) Lluís Riera 2021–2022
- (Croatia) Arnel Dedić 2022–2023
- (Estonia) Brett Nõmm 2023–2025
- (Estonia) Kustas Põldoja 2026–present

== Season by season ==
Season	Tier	Division	Pos.	Estonian Cup	Baltic competitions	
2008–09	3	II liiga	1st			
2009–10	2	I liiga	5th			
2010–11	1	KML	6th	Quarterfinalist		
2011–12	1	KML	4th	Quarterfinalist	BBL Challenge Cup	RS
2012–13	1	KML	4th	Runner-up	Baltic Basketball League	RS
2013–14	1	KML	7th	Quarterfinalist	Baltic Basketball League	RS
2014–15	1	KML	3rd	Quarterfinalist	Baltic Basketball League	EF
2015–16	1	KML	3rd	Second round	Baltic Basketball League	EF
2016–17	1	KML	2nd	Quarterfinalist	Baltic Basketball League	EF
2017–18	1	KML	3rd		Baltic Basketball League	QF
2018–19	1	KML	6th		Estonian-Latvian Basketball League	7th
2019–20	1	KML	2nd (Note: The season was cancelled due to the COVID-19 pandemic.)		Estonian-Latvian Basketball League	–
2020–21	1	KML	3rd	Quarterfinalist	Estonian-Latvian Basketball League	4th
2021–22	1	KML	6th	Quarterfinalist	Estonian-Latvian Basketball League	9th
2022–23	1	KML	5th	Quarterfinalist	Estonian-Latvian Basketball League	6th
2023–24	1	KML	3rd	Quarterfinalist	Estonian-Latvian Basketball League	10th
2024–25	1	KML	3rd	Fourth place	Estonian-Latvian Basketball League	10th
2025–26	2	I liiga	4th	Quarterfinalist		

== Trophies and awards ==
=== Trophies ===
- Estonian League

Runners-up (1): 2016–17

- Estonian Cup

Runners-up (1): 2012

=== Individual awards ===
KML Best Defender

- Martin Dorbek – 2013

KML Best Young Player

- Rait-Riivo Laane – 2012, 2013

KML Coach of the Year

- Aivar Kuusmaa – 2017

KML All-Star Five

- Heigo Erm – 2011
- Janar Soo – 2012
- Domagoj Bubalo – 2015
- Indrek Kajupank – 2016, 2017
- Martin Paasoja – 2017
- Thomas van der Mars – 2017
- Dominique Hawkins – 2018
- Roberts Freimanis – 2021
- Tormi Niits – 2024

Estonian-Latvian League All-Star Five

- Brandon Childress – 2021
