= Sadolin Sports Hall =

Sports venue in Rapla, Estonia

Sadolin Spordihoone
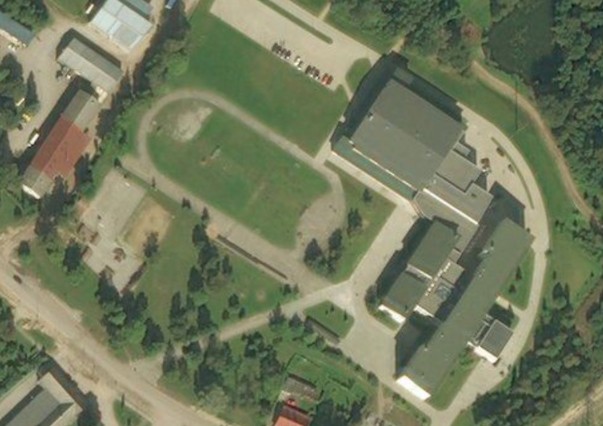
- Interactive map of Sadolin Spordihoone
- Location: Viljandi 69, Rapla, Estonia
- Coordinates: 58°59′53.06″N 24°48′48.03″E
- Owner: SA Rapla Spordirajatised
- Operator: SA Rapla Spordirajatised
- Capacity: Basketball: 958

Construction
- Opened: 2010

Tenant
- Rapla KK (KML) (2010–present)

Website
- Official website

The Sadolin Sports Hall (Estonian: Sadolin Spordihoone) is a multi-purpose indoor arena complex in Rapla. It was opened in 2010 and is the current home arena of the Estonian Basketball League team Rapla KK.
