= 2022 KML Playoffs =

Estonian national championships in basketball

KML Play-offs
- Season: 2022
- Dates: 26 April – 26 May
- Teams: 7

Finals
- Champions: Pärnu Sadam
- Runners-up: Tartu Ülikool Maks & Moorits
- Third place: Kalev/Cramo
- Fourth place: TalTech
- Finals MVP: (Latvia) Andris Misters

The 2022 KML Play-offs was the tournament to determine the Korvpalli Meistriliiga champions for the 2021–22 season. Regular season was spent in the Estonian-Latvian Basketball League, plus 1 round in the local league, before determining seeding for the play-offs. 7 of 8 teams that participated in the regular season qualified for the play-offs, which started with the quarterfinals. The play-offs began on 26 April 2022 and ended on 26 May. Pärnu Sadam won their first ever title.

== Format ==
Eight Estonian teams participated in the regular season, which was spent in two parts. First, all teams played in the Latvian-Estonian Basketball League and after played one more round only against Estonian teams. 7 out of 8 teams qualified for the play-offs. Winner of the regular season immediately qualified for the semi-finals, while teams that finished the regular season 2nd to 7th place started the play-offs with quarterfinals. Winners of all play-off rounds are determined in the series of best-of-five format.

== Teams ==
Location of the 22 KML play-offs

=== Venues and locations ===
Team	Home city	Arena	Capacity
(Estonia) Avis Utilitas Rapla	Rapla	Sadolin Sports Hall	1000
(Estonia) Kalev/Cramo	Tallinn	Kalev Sports Hall	1870
(Estonia) Kalev/Cramo	Tallinn	Saku Suurhall	7200
(Estonia) Pärnu Sadam	Pärnu	Pärnu Sports Hall	1820
(Estonia) Rakvere Tarvas	Rakvere	Rakvere Sports Hall	2747
(Estonia) Tallinna Kalev	Tallinn	Kalev Sports Hall	1870
(Estonia) TalTech	Tallinn	TalTech Sports Hall	1000
(Estonia) Tartu Ülikool Maks & Moorits	Tartu	University of Tartu Sports Hall	2600
(Estonia) Viimsi/Sportland	Viimsi	Karulaugu Spordikeskus	500

=== Personnel and kits ===
Team	Head coach	Captain	Kit manufacturer
(Estonia) Avis Utilitas Rapla	(Spain) Lluis Riera	(Estonia) Sven Kaldre	Spalding
(Estonia) Kalev/Cramo	(Latvia) Roberts Štelmahers	(Estonia) Martin Dorbek	Nike
(Estonia) Pärnu Sadam	(Estonia) Heiko Rannula	(Estonia) Mihkel Kirves	Nike
(Estonia) Rakvere Tarvas	(Estonia) Martin Müürsepp	(Estonia) Sten Saaremäel	Spalding
(Estonia) Tallinna Kalev	(Estonia) Brett Nõmm	(Estonia) Mario Paiste	Nike
(Estonia) TalTech	(Estonia) Alar Varrak	(Estonia) Oliver Metsalu	Nike
(Estonia) Tartu Ülikool Maks & Moorits	(Latvia) Nikolajs Mazurs	(Lithuania) Adomas Drungilas	Spalding
(Estonia) KK Viimsi	(Estonia) Valdo Lips	(Estonia) Rain Veideman	Nike

== Seeding ==
Pos	Team	Pld	W	L	PF	PA	PD	PCT	Qualification or relegation
1	Kalev/Cramo	33	28	5	2824	2174	+650	.848	Advance to semifinals
2	TalTech/Optibet	33	22	11	2701	2528	+173	.667	Advance to quarterfinals
3	Viimsi/Sportland	33	21	12	2609	2575	+34	.636	Advance to quarterfinals
4	Pärnu Sadam	33	20	13	2762	2541	+221	.606	Advance to quarterfinals
5	Avis Utilitas Rapla	33	14	19	2687	2770	−83	.424	Advance to quarterfinals
6	Tartu Ülikool Maks & Moorits	33	14	19	2521	2630	−109	.424	Advance to quarterfinals
7	Tallinna Kalev	33	7	26	2323	2921	−598	.212	Advance to quarterfinals
8	Rakvere Tarvas	33	5	28	2403	2970	−567	.152	

Updated to match(es) played on 24 March 2022. Source: basket.ee

== Play-off bracket ==
Quarterfinals
1	Kalev/Cramo
none
4	Pärnu Sadam	3
5	Avis Utilitas Rapla	1
2	TalTech/Optibet	3
7	Tallinna Kalev	1
3	Viimsi/Sportland	1
6	Tartu Ülikool Maks & Moorits	3

Semifinals
1	Kalev/Cramo	2
4	Pärnu Sadam	3
2	TalTech/Optibet	0
6	Tartu Ülikool Maks & Moorits	3

Finals
4	Pärnu Sadam	3
6	Tartu Ülikool Maks & Moorits	0
Third place
1	Kalev/Cramo	3
2	TalTech/Optibet	0

== Quarter-finals ==
Team 1	Series	Team 2	Game 1	Game 2	Game 3	Game 4
Pärnu Sadam	3–1	Avis Utilitaas Rapla	75–64	67–80	97–81	86–76
TalTech/Optibet	3–1	Tallinna Kalev	104–108 OT	110–63	76–71	83–75
Viimsi/Sportland	1–3	Tartu Ülikool Maks & Moorits	80–77	79–83	75–82	68–69

== Semi-finals ==
Team 1	Series	Team 2	Game 1	Game 2	Game 3	Game 4	Game 5
Kalev/Cramo	2–3	Pärnu Sadam	76–52	99–84	70–91	70–98	73–82
TalTech/Optibet	0–3	Tartu Ülikool Maks & Moorits	67–75	62–77	85–90		

=== Kalev/Cramo vs. Pärnu Sadam ===
7 May	Kalev/Cramo	76–52 (Series: 1–0)	Pärnu Sadam	Tallinn
17:00	Scoring by quarter: 16–11, 18–6, 23–20, 19–15
	Pts: Siliņš, Kitsing, Hermet 13; Rebs: Siliņš 8 Asts: Dorbek 8 PIR: Siliņš 18	Boxscore	Pts: Post 11; Rebs: Van Tamm 9 Asts: Gilbert, Misters, Post 2 PIR: Valeika, Van Tamm 13	Arena: Kalevi Spordihall; Attendance: 503; Referees: T. Suslov, M. Männiste, H. Laas

10 May	Pärnu Sadam	84–99 (Series: 0–2)	Kalev/Cramo	Pärnu
19:00	Scoring by quarter: 17–30, 26–27, 20–17, 21–25
	Pts: Kirves 22; Rebs: Kirves 9 Asts: Post 9 PIR: Kirves 31	Boxscore	Pts: Murphy 20; Rebs: Siliņš, Jackson 7 Asts: Dorbek 9 PIR: Siliņš, Murphy 22	Arena: Pärnu Spordihall; Attendance: 530; Referees: A. Halliko, R. Konks, A. Talisainen

14 May	Kalev/Cramo	70–91 (Series: 2–1)	Pärnu Sadam	Tallinn
17:00	Scoring by quarter: 16–24, 20–17, 12–30, 22–20
	Pts: Murphy 13; Rebs: Murphy 7 Asts: Dorbek, Jackson 3 PIR: Nurger 22	Boxscore	Pts: Gilbert, Van Tamm 18; Rebs: Van Tamm 14; Asts: Gilbert 11; PIR: Van Tamm 28	Arena: Kalevi Spordihall; Attendance: 531; Referees: T. Suslov, M. Männiste, R. Värv

16 May	Pärnu Sadam	98–70 (Series: 2–2)	Kalev/Cramo	Pärnu
19:00	Scoring by quarter: 20–21, 26–20, 26–12, 26–17
	Pts: Konontsuk 21; Rebs: Van Tamm 8 Asts: Post 9 PIR: Konontsuk 23	Boxscore	Pts: Hermet 18; Rebs: Siliņš 7 Asts: Dorbek 7 PIR: Hermet 22	Arena: Pärnu Spordihall; Attendance: 710; Referees: A. Halliko, A. Halliko, A. Talisainen

17 May	Kalev/Cramo	73–82 (Series: 2–3)	Pärnu Sadam	Tallinn
19:00	Scoring by quarter: 25–18, 16–18, 10–23, 22–23
	Pts: Hermet 17; Rebs: Hermet, Murphy 7 Asts: Dorbek, Jackson 5 PIR: Hermet 19	Boxscore	Pts: Konontsuk 22; Rebs: Gilbert, Van Tamm 7 Asts: Post 7 PIR: Post 27	Arena: Kalevi Spordihall; Attendance: 1023; Referees: A. Halliko, T. Suslov, H. Laas

=== TalTech/Optibet vs. Tartu Ülikool Maks & Moorits ===
8 May	TalTech/Optibet	67–75 (Series: 0–1)	Tartu Ülikool Maks & Moorits	Tallinn
17:00	Scoring by quarter: 23–28, 8–13, 10–16, 26–18
	Pts: Metsalu 23; Rebs: Küttis 5 Asts: Childress 6 PIR: Metsalu 26	Boxscore	Pts: Huggins 13; Rebs: Drungilas 7 Asts: Kovliar 7 PIR: Kovliar 25	Arena: TalTech Sports Hall; Attendance: 419; Referees: M. Männiste, R. Konks, A. Talisainen

11 May	Tartu Ülikool Maks & Moorits	77–62 (Series: 2–0)	TalTech/Optibet	Tartu
19:00	Scoring by quarter: 18–23, 26–9, 20–17, 13–13
	Pts: Huggins 32; Rebs: Wembi 9 Asts: Rosenthal, Kovliar, Huggins, Drungilas, Wembi 3 PIR: Huggins 31	Boxscore	Pts: Childress 16; Rebs: Metsalu 5 Asts: Childress 3 PIR: Childress 12	Arena: University of Tartu Sports Hall; Attendance: 1137; Referees: A. Halliko, T. Suslov, H. Laas

13 May	TalTech/Optibet	85–90 (Series: 0–3)	Tartu Ülikool Maks & Moorits	Tallinn
18:00	Scoring by quarter: 22–18, 18–25, 19–24, 26–23
	Pts: Metsalu 28; Rebs: Childress, Keedus 6 Asts: Childress, Sokk 8 PIR: Childress 35	Boxscore	Pts: Huggins 24; Rebs: Eelmäe 6 Asts: Huggins, Drungilas 4 PIR: Huggins, Drungilas 25	Arena: TalTech Sports Hall; Attendance: 537; Referees: R. Peerandi, M. Uuehendrik, R. Värv

== Bronze medal serie ==
Team 1	Series	Team 2	Game 1	Game 2	Game 3
Kalev/Cramo	3–0	TalTech/Optibet	85–75	77–63	79–68

19 May	Kalev/Cramo	85–75 (Series: 1–0)	TalTech/Optibet	Tallinn
19:00	Scoring by quarter: 20–10, 19–25, 27–25, 19–15
	Pts: Kitsing 198; Rebs: Hermet 8 Asts: Vītols 8 PIR: Kitsing 24	Boxscore	Pts: Childress 28; Rebs: Metsalu 8 Asts: Childress 5 PIR: Childress 32	Arena: Kalevi Spordihall; Attendance: 221; Referees: T. Suslov, R. Konks, R. Värv

22 May	TalTech/Optibet	63–77 (Series: 0–2)	Kalev/Cramo	Tallinn
17:00	Scoring by quarter: 21–24, 9–24, 19–11, 14–18
	Pts: Childress 28; Rebs: Metsalu 7 Asts: Metsalu 4 PIR: Childress 29	Boxscore	Pts: Kurbas 16; Rebs: Hermet 10; Asts: Jackson 6 PIR: Kurbas 19	Arena: TalTech Sports Hall; Attendance: 184; Referees: M. Männiste, R. Konks, H. Laas

24 May	Kalev/Cramo	79–68 (Series: 3–0)	TalTech/Optibet	Tallinn
19:00	Scoring by quarter: 19–17, 24–14, 15–18, 21–19
	Pts: Vītols 16; Rebs: Dorbek 6 Asts: Jackson 6 PIR: Nurger, Vītols 19	Boxscore	Pts: Metsalu 18; Rebs: Keedus 11; Asts: Metsalu 5 PIR: Keedus 18	Arena: Kalevi Spordihall; Attendance: 351; Referees: A. Halliko, R. Peerandi, R. Värv

== Final ==
Team 1	Series	Team 2	Game 1	Game 2	Game 3
Pärnu Sadam	3–0	Tartu Ülikool Maks & Moorits	93–88	69–68	73–60

20 May	Pärnu Sadam	93–88 (Series: 1–0)	Tartu Ülikool Maks & Moorits	Pärnu
19:00	Scoring by quarter: 31–19, 23–21, 17–26, 22–22
	Pts: Misters 20; Rebs: Valeika 10; Asts: Misters 7 PIR: Misters 25	Boxscore	Pts: Wembi 23; Rebs: Wembi 8 Asts: Rosenthal, Drungilas, Wembi 3 PIR: Wembi 33	Arena: Pärnu Spordihall; Attendance: 1410; Referees: A. Halliko, M. Männiste, H. Laas

23 May	Tartu Ülikool Maks & Moorits	68–69 (Series: 0–2)	Pärnu Sadam	Tartu
19:00	Scoring by quarter: 28–10, 12–18, 15–22, 13–19
	Pts: Huggins 28; Rebs: Wembi 11; Asts: Rosenthal, Drungilas 3 PIR: Huggins, Wembi 32	Boxscore	Pts: Kirves 17; Rebs: Kirves 13; Asts: Post 8 PIR: Kirves 28	Arena: University of Tartu Sports Hall; Attendance: 2038; Referees: R. Peerandi, M. Uuehendrik, R. Värv

26 May	Pärnu Sadam	73–60 (Series: 3–0)	Tartu Ülikool Maks & Moorits	Pärnu
19:00	Scoring by quarter: 23–20, 15–19, 18–15, 17–6
	Pts: Valge 18; Rebs: Valeika 9 Asts: Post 10; PIR: Konontsuk 22	Boxscore	Pts: Wembi 13; Rebs: Wembi 8 Asts: Kovliar 4 PIR: Wembi 25	Arena: Pärnu Spordihall; Attendance: 2010; Referees: A. Halliko, T. Suslov, R. Konks

== See also ==
- 2021–22 KML season
