= 2023–24 Latvian–Estonian Basketball League =

Paf Latvian–Estonian Basketball League^{1}
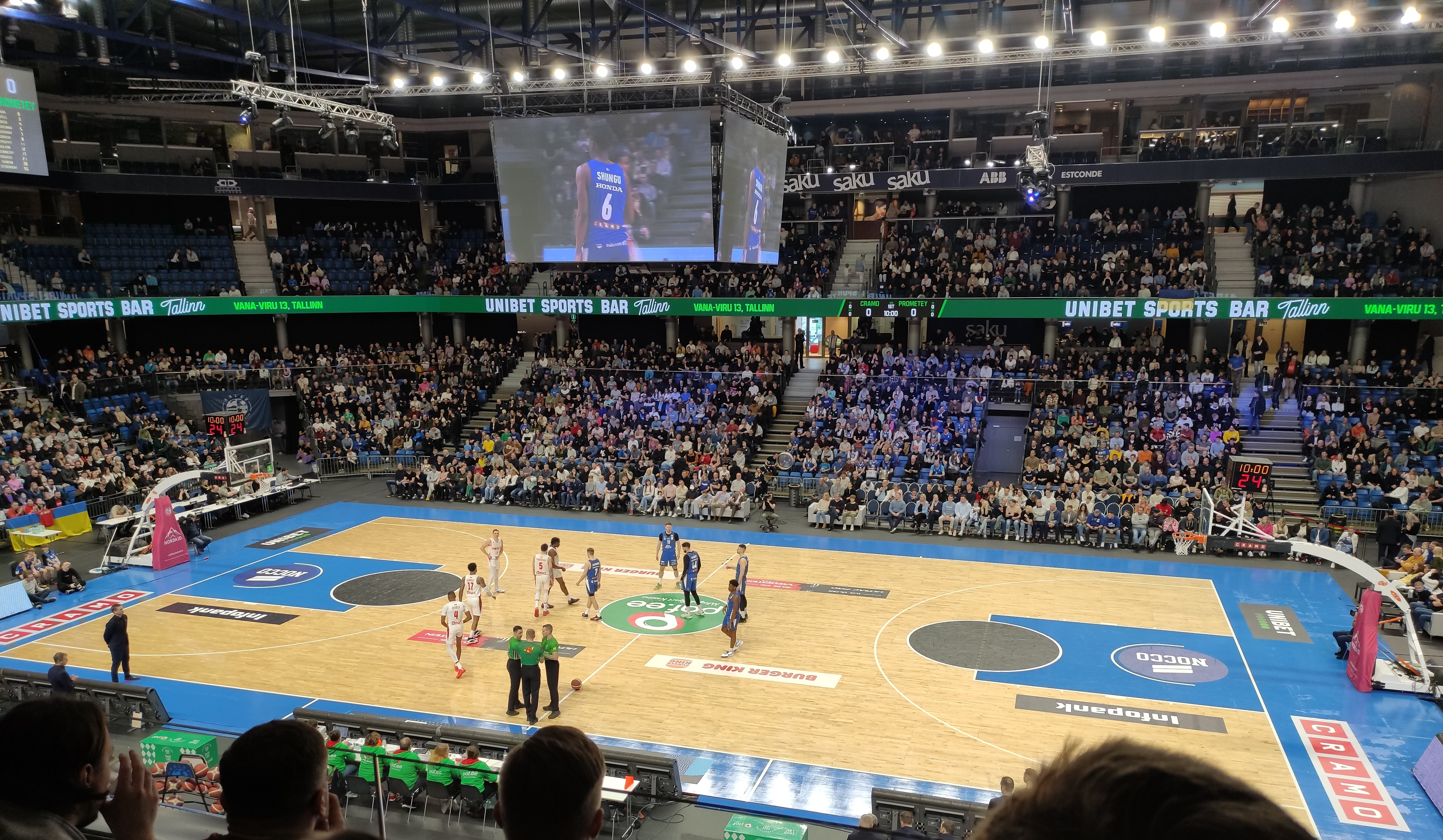
- Final game between Kalev and Prometey
- Season: 2023–24
- Duration: 21 September 2023 – 20 April 2024
- Games played: 240 + playoffs
- Teams: 16
- TV partner(s): Delfi, Inspira, Sportacentrs.com, TV4, Best4Sport TV, LTV7

Finals
- Champions: (Ukraine) BC Prometey
- Runners-up: (Estonia) BC Kalev/Cramo
- Third place: (Latvia) VEF Rīga
- Fourth place: (Latvia) BK Ventspils
- Finals MVP: (Puerto Rico) Gian Clavell

Statistical leaders
Points	(United States) Ishmael El-Amin	19.97
Rebounds	(Puerto Rico) Arnaldo Toro	12.12
Assists	(Estonia) Siim-Markus Post	8.00
Index Rating	(Ukraine) Artem Kovalov	+24.16

Records
- Biggest home win: BC Kalev/Cramo 106–51 BK Ogre (10 November 2023)
- Biggest away win: Tallinn Kalev/SNABB 52–110 BC Prometey (5 January 2024)
- Highest scoring: BK Ventspils 116–87 Keila Coolbet (12 January 2024)
- Winning streak: 24 games BC Kalev/Cramo
- Losing streak: 17 games Tallinn Kalev/SNABB
- Highest attendance: 5,908 BC Kalev/Cramo 80-65 BC Prometey (6 January 2024)
- ^{1} Sponsored league name, referring to Paf.

The 2023–24 Latvian–Estonian Basketball League, known as Paf Latvian–Estonian Basketball League for sponsorship reasons, was the sixth season of the Latvian–Estonian Basketball League, the premier basketball competition for men's teams in Latvia and Estonia.

== Change of play-off format ==
For the first time in league history play-off format changed. Quarterfinals are still to be played in the best-of-three series, however there will be no Final Four tournament anymore. Instead, semifinals are to be played in the best-of-three format. Bronze and gold medals will be played out in one game, host team being the one that was higher in the final standings of the regular season.

== Teams ==
A total of 16 teams are participating in the 2023–24 edition of the league, including the newly established Rīgas Zeļļi. However Rakvere Tarvas left the league. For the second consecutive season, the league is also joined by Ukrainian team BC Prometey, who are the defending champions. Estonian teams with games against each other started the season one week earlier, because of Latvian national team participated in the 2023 FIBA Basketball World Cup, and coaches from many Latvian teams were involved in the national team coaching staff.

=== Venues and locations ===
Location of teams in 2023–24 Latvian–Estonian Basketball League

Team	Home city	Arena	Capacity
(Estonia) AVIS UTILITAS Rapla	Rapla	Sadolin Sports Hall	958
(Estonia) BC Kalev/Cramo	Tallinn	Unibet Arena	7,200
(Estonia) BC Kalev/Cramo	Tallinn	Kalev Sports Hall	1,700
(Ukraine) BC Prometey	Riga	Arena Riga	11,200
(Ukraine) BC Prometey	Riga	Rimi Olympic Sports Center	830
(Latvia) BK Liepāja	Liepāja	Liepāja Olympic Center	2,542
(Latvia) BK Ogre	Ogre	Arēna Ogre	1,700
(Latvia) BK Ventspils	Ventspils	Ventspils Olympic Center	3,085
(Estonia) Keila Coolbet	Keila	Keila Health Center	800
(Latvia) Latvijas Universitāte	Riga	Rimi Olympic Sports Center	830
(Estonia) Pärnu Sadam	Pärnu	Pärnu Sports Hall	1,820
(Latvia) Rīgas Zeļļi	Riga	Arena Riga	11,200
(Latvia) Rīgas Zeļļi	Riga	Daugava Sports Hall	
(Latvia) Rīgas Zeļļi	Riga	Salaspils Sporta nams	
(Latvia) Rīgas Zeļļi	Riga	Mārupes Sporta centrs	
(Latvia) Rīgas Zeļļi	Riga	Sporta komplekss Cēsis	1,080
(Estonia) Tallinn Kalev/SNABB	Tallinn	Nord Cramo Sports Hall	980
(Estonia) TalTech/OPTIBET	Tallinn	TalTech Sports Hall	1,000
(Estonia) Tartu Ülikool Maks & Moorits	Tartu	University of Tartu Sports Hall	2,600
(Latvia) Valmiera GLASS VIA	Valmiera	Vidzeme Olympic Center	1,500
(Latvia) VEF Rīga	Riga	Rimi Olympic Sports Center	830
(Estonia) Viimsi	Haabneeme	Forus Sports Center	500

=== Personnel and sponsorship ===
Team	Head coach	Captain	Kit manufacturer	Shirt sponsor
(Estonia) AVIS UTILITAS Rapla	(Estonia) Brett Nõmm	(Estonia) Martin Paasoja	Spalding	Avis, Utilitas, Hepa
(Estonia) BC Kalev/Cramo	(Estonia) Heiko Rannula	(Estonia) Martin Dorbek	Nike	Unibet, Cramo
(Ukraine) BC Prometey	(Czech Republic) Ronen Ginzburg	(Ukraine) Illia Sydorov	Nike	DMart.
(Latvia) BK Liepāja	(Latvia) Artūrs Visockis-Rubenis	(Latvia) Kristaps Miglinieks	Nike	CleanR Grupa
(Latvia) BK Ogre	(Latvia) Uldis Švēde	(Latvia) Kristaps Dārgais	Nike	Steel
(Latvia) BK Ventspils	(Latvia) Gints Fogels	(Latvia) Artūrs Ausējs	Joma	Kurekss Ltd.
(Estonia) Keila Coolbet	(Estonia) Peep Pahv	(Lithuania) Denis Krestinin	Nike	Coolbet
(Latvia) Latvijas Universitāte	(Latvia) Gunārs Gailītis	(Latvia) Edvards Lucis	Nike	Evolution, University of Latvia
(Estonia) Pärnu Sadam	(Estonia) Gert Kullamäe	(United States) Troy Barnies	Nike	Betsafe, Port of Pärnu
(Latvia) Rīgas Zeļļi	(Latvia) Juris Umbraško	(Latvia) Uģis Pinete	Nike	Betsafe
(Estonia) Tallinn Kalev/SNABB	(Estonia) Kalle Klandorf	(Estonia) Mario Paiste	Nike	SNABB
(Estonia) TalTech/OPTIBET	(Estonia) Alar Varrak	(Estonia) Oliver Metsalu	Nike	Optibet
(Estonia) Tartu Ülikool Maks & Moorits	(Latvia) Gundars Vētra	(Estonia) Rain Veideman	Ballzy	Maks & Moorits
(Latvia) Valmiera Glass VIA	(Latvia) Nikolajs Mazurs	(Latvia) Edmunds Elksnis	Nike	Valmiera Glass
(Latvia) VEF Rīga	(Latvia) Jānis Gailītis	(Latvia) Dairis Bertāns	Adidas	LVBET
(Estonia) Viimsi	(Estonia) Valdo Lips	(Estonia) Oliver Suurorg	Nike	Viimsi

== Regular season ==
=== League table ===
Pos	Team	Pld	W	L	PF	PA	PD	PCT	Qualification
1	(Estonia) BC Kalev/Cramo	30	29	1	2597	2079	+518	.967	Qualification to playoffs
2	(Ukraine) BC Prometey	30	26	4	2688	2032	+656	.867	Qualification to playoffs
3	(Latvia) VEF Rīga	30	24	6	2569	2161	+408	.800	Qualification to playoffs
4	(Latvia) BK Ventspils	30	20	10	2737	2543	+194	.667	Qualification to playoffs
5	(Estonia) Tartu Ülikool Maks & Moorits	30	19	11	2262	2082	+180	.633	Qualification to playoffs
6	(Latvia) Rīgas Zeļļi	30	18	12	2372	2214	+158	.600	Qualification to playoffs
7	(Latvia) BK Ogre	30	17	13	2407	2314	+93	.567	Qualification to playoffs
8	(Estonia) Pärnu Sadam	30	15	15	2324	2314	+10	.500	Qualification to playoffs
9	(Estonia) TalTech/OPTIBET	30	14	16	2378	2422	−44	.467	
10	(Estonia) AVIS UTILITAS Rapla	30	12	18	2239	2337	−98	.400	
11	(Latvia) BK Liepāja	30	11	19	2347	2446	−99	.367	
12	(Estonia) Keila Coolbet	30	10	20	2373	2584	−211	.333	
13	(Latvia) Valmiera GLASS VIA	30	9	21	2232	2484	−252	.300	
14	(Latvia) Latvijas Universitāte	30	6	24	2059	2504	−445	.200	
15	(Estonia) Viimsi	30	6	24	2048	2551	−503	.200	
16	(Estonia) Tallinn Kalev/SNABB	30	4	26	2103	2668	−565	.133	

Source: EstLatBL.com

=== Results ===
Home \ Away	RAP	KAL	BCP	BKL	OGR	BKV	KEI	LAT	PAR	ZEL	TKL	TCH	TRT	VIA	VEF	VMS
AVIS UTILITAS Rapla	—	67–71	61–102	98–89	72–61	72–76	86–94	71–63	81–89	68–89	72–78	80–79	79–78	76–83	71–85	85–64
BC Kalev/Cramo	82–54	—	80–65	91–69	106–51	81–60	92–79	89–78	78–77	73–65	98–51	81–63	74–71	108–68	73–66	82–61
BC Prometey	90–66	103–72	—	103–70	76–85	86–77	113–59	81–47	101–74	92–79	107–62	101–71	93–71	91–77	70–66	106–61
BK Liepāja	72–65	90–93	70–83	—	75–61	70–90	99–88	92–70	75–65	84–81	87–63	68–81	78–84	83–74	78–85	73–76
BK Ogre	75–77	67–78	68–91	86–62	—	105–99	89–65	78–65	93–72	75–87	101–73	89–56	65–80	76–66	74–94	88–71
BK Ventspils	88–78	88–110	94–96	96–102	84–78	—	116–87	103–81	91–84	100–92	93–66	101–90	92–63	106–64	68–107	97–90
Keila Coolbet	75–86	71–115	74–89	97–89	80–71	93–103	—	95–72	88–93	71–78	83–74	81–86	80–73	77–80	72–77	82–80
Latvijas Universitāte	54–72	56–104	60–106	68–69	64–78	71–97	79–74	—	56–77	59–88	87–60	60–86	68–98	87–82	72–85	84–71
Pärnu Sadam	66–61	70–100	49–80	83–79	73–82	77–80	83–66	93–63	—	69–64	104–63	92–70	84–82	68–70	78–88	79–63
Rīgas Zeļļi	77–78	71–75	65–91	81–79	75–83	89–86	77–56	87–62	85–81	—	78–50	81–51	59–56	87–78	93–86	81–64
Tallinn Kalev/SNABB	76–82	66–84	52–110	85–77	88–100	80–94	91–101	75–83	75–82	64–89	—	73–82	63–77	87–79	66–92	56–69
TalTech/OPTIBET	86–79	64–67	24 Mar	89–68	90–93	100–98	83–72	73–81	75–77	72–89	105–74	—	83–87	99–81	80–78	96–59
Tartu Ülikool Maks & Moorits	71–61	63–77	20–0	78–63	82–76	83–88	77–73	90–71	88–78	63–56	87–71	65–73	—	93–71	74–72	76–24
Valmiera GLASS VIA	77–75	79–86	71–91	65–88	73–94	74–92	80–90	67–53	61–56	71–78	96–62	78–67	61–69	—	85–105	68–60
VEF Rīga	80–78	76–82	83–76	86–76	81–74	99–76	81–60	79–74	80–64	98–77	94–64	95–59	88–73	84–71	—	96–46
Viimsi	67–88	70–95	67–91	78–73	59–91	75–104	72–90	84–71	76–87	79–74	75–95	70–88	61–90	96–82	57–83	—

Source: EstLatBL.com
Legend: Blue = home team win; Red = away team win.
Matches with lighter background shading were decided after overtime.

== Playoffs ==
=== Quarterfinals ===
Team 1	Agg.	Team 2	1st leg	2nd leg	3rd leg
BC Kalev/Cramo (Estonia)	2–0	(Estonia) Pärnu Sadam	83–77	77-63	
BC Prometey (Ukraine)	2–0	(Latvia) BK Ogre	97–82	90-82	
VEF Rīga (Latvia)	2–0	(Latvia) Rīgas Zeļļi	87–72	94–87	
BK Ventspils (Latvia)	2–1	(Estonia) Tartu Ülikool Maks & Moorits	103–69	69–82	103–83

==== BC Kalev/Cramo vs. Pärnu Sadam ====
29 March 2024	BC Kalev/Cramo (Estonia)	83–77 (Series: 1–0)	(Estonia) Pärnu Sadam	Tallinn
19:00 (GMT)	Scoring by quarter: 13–30, 25–12, 25–18, 20–17
	Pts: Suarez 17; Rebs: Hermet 11; Asts: Böckler 3	Box Score	Pts: Valge 21; Rebs: Tamm 7 Asts: Post 9	Arena: Kalev Sports Hall; Attendance: 827; Referees: A. Halliko, M. Männiste, I. Kelement

1 April 2024	Pärnu Sadam (Estonia)	63–77 (Series: 0–2)	(Estonia) BC Kalev/Cramo	Pärnu
19:00 (GMT)	Scoring by quarter: 16–18, 19–18, 13–17, 15–24
	Pts: Valge 17; Rebs: Dijkstra 9 Asts: Post 10	Box Score	Pts: Suarez 20; Rebs: Suarez 11; Asts: 3 players 4	Arena: Pärnu Sports Hall; Attendance: 1,047; Referees: R. Peerandi, H. Laas, R. Kobin

==== BC Prometey vs. BK Ogre ====
30 March 2024	BC Prometey (Ukraine)	97–82 (Series: 1–0)	(Latvia) BK Ogre	Riga
17:00 (GMT)	Scoring by quarter: 20–20, 27–19, 28–21, 22–22
	Pts: March 18; Rebs: Balvín, March 9 Asts: Sydorov 5	Box Score	Pts: Misters 17; Rebs: Misters 7 Asts: Dārgais 6	Arena: Rimi Olympic Sports Center; Attendance: 316

3 April 2024	BK Ogre (Latvia)	82–90 (Series: 0-2)	(Ukraine) BC Prometey	Ogre
19:00 (GMT)	Scoring by quarter: 23–25, 19–22, 21–20, 19–23
	Pts: Dārgais 19; Rebs: Dārgais 13; Asts: Dārgais 6	Box Score	Pts: Balvín 16; Rebs: Balvín 8 Asts: March 4	Arena: Arēna Ogre; Attendance: 948; Referees: R.Helmšteins, A.Petrovs, M.Visočanskis

==== VEF Rīga vs. Rīgas Zeļļi ====
29 March 2024	VEF Rīga (Latvia)	87–72 (Series: 1–0)	(Latvia) Rīgas Zeļļi	Riga
19:00 (GMT)	Scoring by quarter: 21–15, 14–18, 20–20, 32–19
	Pts: Whittington 26; Rebs: Toro Barea, Whittington 11; Asts: Lottie 5	Box Score	Pts: Hunter 17; Rebs: Hunter 8 Asts: Viksne 5	Arena: Rimi Olympic Center; Attendance: 796

1 April	Rīgas Zeļļi (Latvia)	87–94 (Series: 0–2)	(Latvia) VEF Rīga	Riga
18:00 (GMT)	Scoring by quarter: 24–20, 19–25, 19–25, 25–24
	Pts: Skuja 32; Rebs: Kamaka Hepa 7 Asts: Skuja 9	Box Score	Pts: Pipes 26; Rebs: Toro Barea 7 Asts: Lottie, Whittington 4	Arena: Daugava Sports Hall; Attendance: 665

==== BK Ventspils vs. Tartu Ülikool Maks & Moorits ====
29 March 2024	BK Ventspils (Latvia)	103–69 (Series: 1–0)	(Estonia) Tartu Ülikool Maks & Moorits	Ventspils
17:00 (GMT)	Scoring by quarter: 27–12, 26–19, 17–20, 33–18
	Pts: Vasiljević 18; Rebs: Jaunzems 10; Asts: Birkāns 6	Box Score	Pts: Rosenthal 15; Rebs: Eelmäe 6 Asts: Rosenthal, Harris 4	Arena: Ventspils Olympic Center; Attendance: 810

3 April 2024	Tartu Ülikool Maks & Moorits (Estonia)	82–69 (Series: 1-1)	(Latvia) BK Ventspils	Tartu
19:00 (GMT)	Scoring by quarter: 18–19, 23–18, 24–18, 17–14
	Pts: Rosenthal 24; Rebs: Rozītis 10; Asts: Rosenthal 4	Box Score	Pts: El-Amin 17; Rebs: Francis 10; Asts: Birkāns 5	Arena: University of Tartu Sports Hall; Attendance: 756; Referees: O. Latisevs, I. Kitsing, M. Senkevics

5 April 2024	BK Ventspils (Latvia)	103–83 (Series: 2–1)	(Estonia) Tartu Ülikool Maks & Moorits	Ventspils
19:00 (GMT)	Scoring by quarter: 21–18, 25–14, 30–18, 27–23
	Pts: Jaunzems 35; Rebs: Vasiljević 10	Box Score	Pts: Kitsing 15; Rebs: Mālmanis 7 Asts: Rosenthal, Harris 6	Arena: Ventspils Olympic Center; Attendance: 1,230

=== Semifinals ===
Team 1	Agg.	Team 2	1st leg	2nd leg	3rd leg
BC Kalev/Cramo (Estonia)	2–1	(Latvia) BK Ventspils	91–65	70–85	84–73
BC Prometey (Ukraine)	2–0	(Latvia) VEF Rīga	76–66	87–66	

==== BC Kalev/Cramo vs. BK Ventspils ====
9 April 2024	BC Kalev/Cramo (Estonia)	91–65 (Series: 1–0)	(Latvia) BK Ventspils	Tallinn
19:30 (GMT)	Scoring by quarter: 30–21, 19–22, 17–7, 25-15
	Pts: Suarez, Shungu 20; Rebs: Suarez 10; Asts: Kaukiainen 5	Box Score	Pts: Jaunzems, Zaķis 15; Rebs: Jaunzems 12; Asts: Jaunzems 5	Arena: Kalev Sports Hall; Attendance: 1,003; Referees: A. Aunkrogers, M. Männiste, E. Tukiss

12 April 2024	BK Ventspils (Latvia)	85–70 (Series: 1-1)	(Estonia) BC Kalev/Cramo	Ventspils
19:00 (GMT)	Scoring by quarter: 21-15, 28-18, 15-18, 21-19
	Pts: Ausējs 21; Rebs: Vasiljevic 11; Asts: Birkāns 6	Box Score	Pts: Hermet 17; Rebs: Suarez 14; Asts: 4 players 2	Arena: Ventspils Olympic Center; Attendance: 1,080; Referees: R. Vark, R. Helmšteins, H. Laas

16 April 2024	BC Kalev/Cramo (Estonia)	84–73 (Series: 2–1)	(Latvia) BK Ventspils	Tallinn
19:30 (GMT)	Scoring by quarter: 13–16, 19–18, 26–18, 26–19
	Pts: Shungu 26; Rebs: Nurger, Suarez 7 Asts: Dorbek 7	Box Score	Pts: El-Amin 18; Rebs: Jaunzems 7 Asts: Jaunzems 5	Arena: Kalev Sports Hall; Attendance: 1,213; Referees: A. Halliko, R. Helmsteins, E. Tukiss

==== BC Prometey vs. VEF Rīga ====
10 April 2024	BC Prometey (Ukraine)	76–66 (Series: 1–0)	(Latvia) VEF Rīga	Riga
19:00 (GMT)	Scoring by quarter: 19–17, 22–18, 20–14, 15–17
	Pts: Sydorov, Odiase 15; Rebs: Kennedy 8 Asts: Clavell 6	Box Score	Pts: Pipes 23; Rebs: Toro Barea 10; Asts: Pipes 8	Arena: Rimi Olympic Sports Center; Attendance: 543

14 April 2024	VEF Rīga (Latvia)	66–87 (Series: 0–2)	(Ukraine) BC Prometey	Riga
19:00 (GMT)	Scoring by quarter: 19–15, 16-17, 7–25, 24–30
	Pts: Whittington 24; Rebs: Toro Barea 11; Asts: Pipes 4	Box Score	Pts: Tkachenko 15; Rebs: Odiase 7 Asts: Sanon 4	Arena: Rimi Olympic Sports Center; Attendance: 1,038

=== Third place game ===
19 April 2024	VEF Rīga (Latvia)	84–76	(Latvia) BK Ventspils	Riga
19:00 (GMT)	Scoring by quarter: 25–22, 18–17, 19–17, 22–20
	Pts: Pipes 25; Rebs: Toro Barea 17; Asts: Blūms 6	Box Score	Pts: Ausējs 26; Rebs: 3 players, 5 Asts: El-Amin 5	Arena: Rimi Olympic Sports Center; Attendance: 917

=== Final ===
20 April 2024	BC Kalev/Cramo (Estonia)	83–91	(Ukraine) BC Prometey	Tallinn
19:30 (GMT)	Scoring by quarter: 25-29, 26-14, 9-23, 23-25
	Pts: Hermet 27; Rebs: Hermet 9 Asts: Shungu 8	Box Score	Pts: Clavell 26; Rebs: Kennedy 12; Asts: Sanon 6	Arena: Unibet Arena; Attendance: 3,847; Referees: R.Peerandi, K.Konstantinovs, G.Saliņš

== Bracket ==
Quarter-finals
1	(Estonia) Kalev/Cramo	2
8	(Estonia) Pärnu Sadam	0
4	(Latvia) BK Ventspils	2
5	(Estonia) Tartu Ülikool Maks & Moorits	1
2	(Ukraine) BC Prometey	2
7	(Latvia) BK Ogre	0
3	(Latvia) VEF Rīga	2
6	(Latvia) Rīgas Zeļļi	0

Semi-finals
1	(Estonia) Kalev/Cramo	2
4	(Latvia) BK Ventspils	1
2	(Ukraine) BC Prometey	2
3	(Latvia) VEF Rīga	0

Finals
1	(Estonia) Kalev/Cramo	83
2	(Ukraine) BC Prometey	91
Third place
3	(Latvia) VEF Rīga	84
4	(Latvia) BK Ventspils	76

== Awards ==
=== MVP of the Month ===
Month	Player	Team	Ref.
2023
October	(Estonia) Kasper Suurorg	(Estonia) TalTech/OPTIBET	
November	(Latvia) Linards Jaunzems	(Latvia) BK Ventspils	
December	(Estonia) Märt Rosenthal	(Estonia) Tartu Ülikool Maks & Moorits	
2024
January	(United States) Ishmael El-Amin	(Latvia) BK Ventspils	
February	(Estonia) Siim-Markus Post	(Estonia) Pärnu Sadam	
March	(Puerto Rico) Arnaldo Toro Barea	(Latvia) VEF Rīga	

=== Final MVP ===
(Puerto Rico) Gian Clavell ( (Ukraine) BC Prometey)

=== All-Finals Team ===
- (United States) Ronald March ( (Ukraine) BC Prometey)
- (United States) Ben Shungu ( (Estonia) Kalev/Cramo)
- (Estonia) Kregor Hermet ( (Estonia) Kalev/Cramo)
- (Puerto Rico) Arnaldo Toro ( (Latvia) VEF Rīga)
- (Czech Republic) Ondřej Balvín ( (Ukraine) BC Prometey)

== Statistics ==
As of 20 April 2024.

=== Points ===
Rank	Name	Team	PPG
1.	(United States) Ishmael El-Amin	(Latvia) BK Ventspils	20.0
2.	(Ukraine) Artem Kovalov	(Estonia) KK Viimsi	18.3
3.	(Estonia) Märt Rosenthal	(Estonia) Tartu Ülikool Maks & Moorits	18.1
4.	(Estonia) Kasper Suurorg	(Estonia) TalTech/Optibet	17.8
5.	(Latvia) Linards Jaunzems	(Latvia) BK Ventspils	16.1

=== Rebounds ===
Rank	Name	Team	RPG
1.	(Puerto Rico) Arnaldo Toro	(Latvia) VEF Rīga	12.1
2.	(Latvia) Kristaps Dārgais	(Latvia) BK Ogre	9.8
3.	(Ukraine) Artem Kovalov	(Estonia) KK Viimsi	9.3
4.	(Latvia) Guntis Sīpoliņš	(Latvia) Valmiera Glass VIA	8.6
5.	(United States) James Moore	(Estonia) Kalev/SNABB	8.3

=== Assists ===
Rank	Name	Team	APG
1.	(Estonia) Siim-Markus Post	(Estonia) Pärnu Sadam	8.0
2.	(Estonia) Oliver Suurorg	(Estonia) KK Viimsi	5.8
3.	(Latvia) Valters Briedis	(Latvia) Latvijas Universitāte	5.4
4.	(United States) Jaizec Lottie	(Latvia) VEF Rīga	5.3
5.	(Estonia) Rait-Riivo Laane	(Estonia) AVIS Utilitas Rapla	5.2

== Clubs in European competitions ==
Team	Competition	Progress
(Ukraine) BC Prometey	EuroCup	Quarterfinals
(Latvia) VEF Rīga	Champions League	Regular season
(Estonia) BC Kalev/Cramo	Champions League	Qualifying
(Estonia) BC Kalev/Cramo	FIBA Europe Cup	Regular season
(Estonia) Pärnu Sadam	FIBA Europe Cup	Qualifying

== See also ==
- 2024 KML Playoffs
- 2024 LBL Play-offs
