= Arnaldo Toro =

Puerto Rican basketball player (born 1997)

Arnaldo Toro Barea
Iwate Big Bulls
- Position: Power forward / center
- League: B.League

Personal information
- Born: October 28, 1997 (age 29) Mayagüez, Puerto Rico
- Listed height: 6 ft 8 in (2.03 m)
- Listed weight: 248 lb (112 kg)

Career information
- High school: St. Benedict's Preparatory School (Newark, New Jersey)
- College: George Washington (2016–2020); St. John's (2020–2021)
- NBA draft: 2021: undrafted
- Playing career: 2021–present

Career history
- 2021–2022: BC Nokia
- 2022: Cariduros de Fajardo
- 2022–2023: Landstede Hammers
- 2023–2024: VEF Rīga
- 2024: Santeros de Aguada
- 2024–2025: Juventus Utena
- 2025: VEF Rīga
- 2025–2026: Szombathely Falco
- 2026–present: Iwate Big Bulls

Career highlights
- Latvian–Estonian Basketball League All-Final Four Team (2024); Korisliiga best rebounder (2022); BNXT League best rebounder (2023); Latvian Basketball Cup winner (2024); LBL champion (2024); LBL MVP (2024)
Medals
Men's basketball
Representing Puerto Rico
Central American and Caribbean Games
Bronze medal – third place	2023 San Salvador	Team

Arnaldo Toro Barea (born October 28, 1997) is a Puerto Rican professional basketball player for the Iwate Big Bulls of the Japanese B.League. He played college basketball for George Washington University and St. John's. He also represents the senior Puerto Rican national team. Standing at a height of 6 ft 8 in (2.03 m), he plays the power forward and center positions.

== Professional career ==
=== VEF Rīga (2023–2024) ===
On October 5, 2023, Toro signed with VEF Rīga in Latvian-Estonian Basketball League and Basketball Champions League.

=== Juventus Utena (2024–2025) ===
On August 6, 2024, Toro signed a one-year deal with Juventus Utena of the Lithuanian Basketball League (LKL). He was released by the team on April 14, 2025.

== National team ==
Toro represented Puerto Rico in the 2014 FIBA Under-17 World Championship, where he was the best rebounder and averaged double-double. He represented Puerto Rico national team the 2023 FIBA Basketball World Cup. He was also part of the team that helped Puerto Rico qualify for the 2024 Summer Olympics after defeating both Italy in the semifinals and Lithuania in the final of one of four 2024 FIBA Men's Olympic Qualifying Tournaments. Toro won a bronze medal with his national team at the 2023 Central American and Caribbean Games held in San Salvador, El Salvador.
