= Ben Shungu =

American basketball player (born 1997)

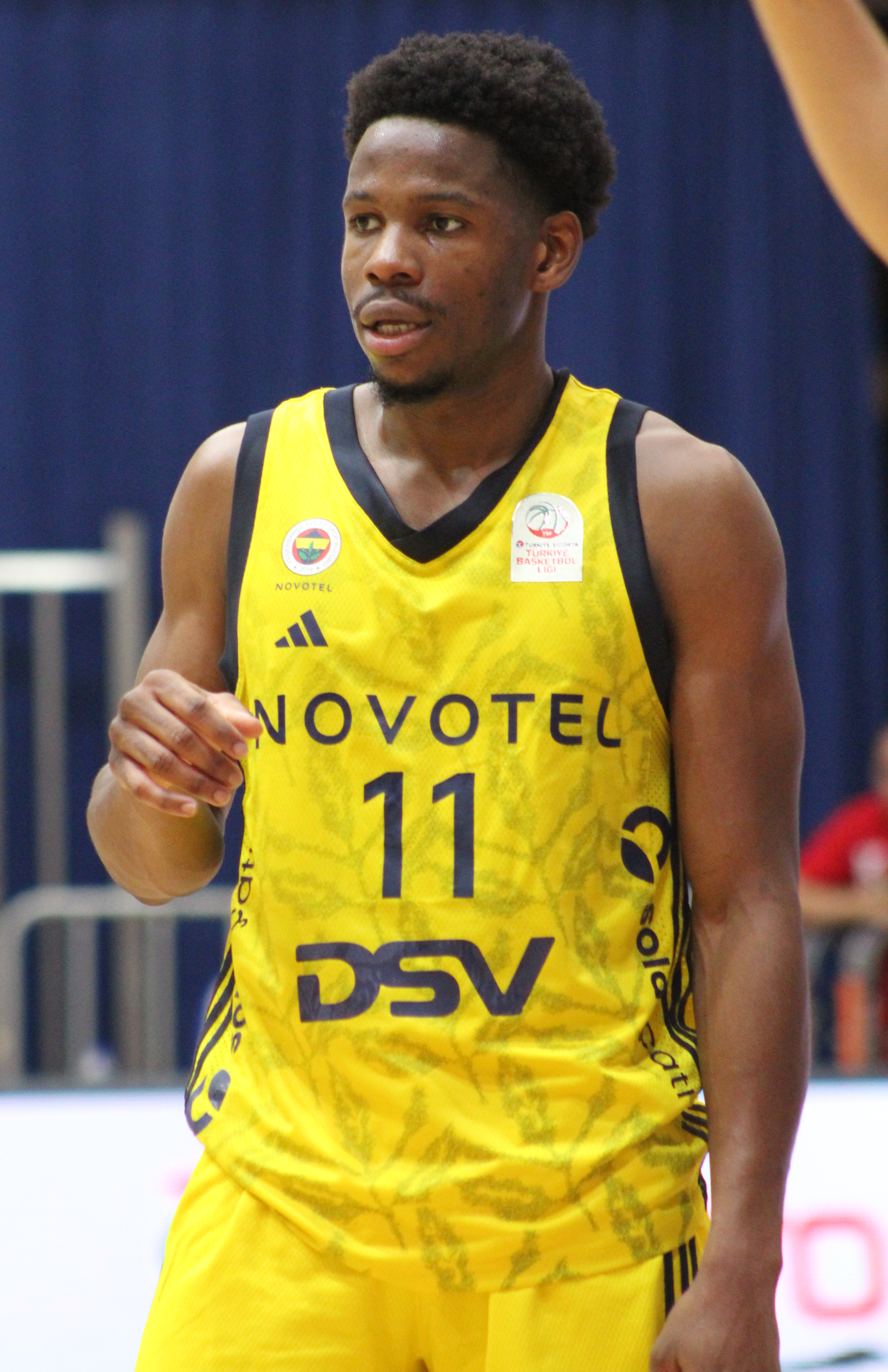
- Shungu with Fenerbahçe in 2024

No. 2 – Rīgas Zeļļi
- Position: Point guard
- League: LEBL

Personal information
- Born: October 4, 1997 (age 28) South Burlington, Vermont, U.S.
- Listed height: 6 ft 3 in (1.91 m)
- Listed weight: 200 lb (91 kg)

Career information
- High school: Rice Memorial (South Burlington, Vermont)
- College: Vermont (2017–2022)
- NBA draft: 2022: undrafted
- Playing career: 2022–present

Career history
- 2022–2023: Riesen Ludwigsburg
- 2023: Karlsruhe Lions
- 2023–2024: Giants Düsseldorf
- 2024: BC Kalev
- 2024–2025: Fenerbahçe Koleji
- 2025: Hapoel Afula
- 2025–2026: Legia Warsaw
- 2026–present: Rīgas Zeļļi

Career highlights
- Estonian League champion (2024); Estonian League Finals MVP (2024); Estonian Cup Champion (2024); Latvian–Estonian League All-Star Five (2024); 2× Vermont Gatorade Player of the Year (2015, 2016)

Ben Shungu (born October 4, 1997) is an American professional basketball player for Rīgas Zeļļi of the Latvian–Estonian Basketball League (LEBL). He played college basketball for the Vermont Catamounts.

== Professional career ==
In 2022, after graduating from Vermont, Shungu signed his first pro contract with Riesen Ludwigsburg in the German Basketball Bundesliga. In the middle of the rookie season, he transferred to Karlsruhe Lions. Next season he started with Giants Düsseldorf in the same German 2nd League. In January, 2024, Shungu signed for Kalev/Cramo.

After winning Estonian Championship and Finals MVP he signed for the Fenerbahçe Koleji in the Turkish 2nd League. In 31 games he recorded very impressive stats: 16.6ppg, 4.8rpg, 5.7apg and 1.0spg. He was also voted League Player of the Week (2 times) but late in the season joined Hapoel Afula.

On July 6, 2025, Shungu signed with Legia Warsaw.

On January 15, 2026, he signed with Miasto Szkła Krosno of the Polish Basketball League (PLK).
