= 2024 KML Playoffs =

Estonian national championships in basketball

PAF Korvpalli Meistriliiga^{1}
- Season: 2023–24
- Duration: 23 April – 28 May
- Games played: 30
- Teams: 8

Finals
- Champions: BC Kalev/Cramo (14th title)
- Runners-up: Tartu Ülikool Maks & Moorits
- Third place: AVIS UTILITAS Rapla
- Fourth place: Pärnu Sadam
- Finals MVP: (United States) Ben Shungu

Statistical leaders
| Points | (Latvia) Kārlis Žunda | 17.0 |
| Rebounds | (United States) Tydus Verhoeven | 9.33 |
| Assists | (Estonia) Siim-Markus Post | 7.69 |

Records
- Biggest home win: BC Kalev/Cramo 106–51 AVIS UTILITAS Rapla (8 May 2024)
- Biggest away win: AVIS UTILITAS Rapla 66–110 BC Kalev/Cramo (10 May 2024)
- Highest attendance: 2,338 Tartu Ülikool Maks & Moorits 61–82 BC Kalev/Cramo (25 May 2024)
- ^{1} Sponsored league name, referring to PAF.

The 2024 KML Playoffs was the Estonian–Latvian Basketball League postseason tournament held to determine the 2023–24 champions of the Korvpalli Meistriliiga (KML). The playoffs began on 23 April 2024 and ended on 28 May with BC Kalev/Cramo defeating Tartu Ülikool Maks & Moorits in the finals.

== Qualified teams ==
The club rankings were determined by the results of the 2023–24 Estonian-Latvian Basketball League regular season.

| Pos | Team | Pld | W | L | PF | PA | PD | PCT | Qualification |
|---|---|---|---|---|---|---|---|---|---|
| 1 | BC Kalev/Cramo | 30 | 29 | 1 | 2597 | 2079 | +518 | .967 | Qualification to playoffs |
| 2 | Tartu Ülikool Maks & Moorits | 30 | 19 | 11 | 2262 | 2082 | +180 | .633 | Qualification to playoffs |
| 3 | Pärnu Sadam | 30 | 15 | 15 | 2324 | 2314 | +10 | .500 | Qualification to playoffs |
| 4 | TalTech/OPTIBET | 30 | 14 | 16 | 2378 | 2422 | −44 | .467 | Qualification to playoffs |
| 5 | AVIS UTILITAS Rapla | 30 | 12 | 18 | 2239 | 2337 | −98 | .400 | Qualification to playoffs |
| 6 | Keila Coolbet | 30 | 10 | 20 | 2373 | 2584 | −211 | .333 | Qualification to playoffs |
| 7 | Viimsi | 30 | 6 | 24 | 2048 | 2551 | −503 | .200 | Qualification to playoffs |
| 8 | Tallinna Kalev/SNABB | 30 | 4 | 26 | 2103 | 2668 | −565 | .133 | Qualification to playoffs |

Source: basket.ee

== Bracket ==
Quarterfinals
1 | BC Kalev/Cramo | 3
8 | Tallinna Kalev/SNABB | 0
4 | TalTech/OPTIBET | 2
5 | AVIS UTILITAS Rapla | 3
2 | Tartu Ülikool Maks & Moorits | 3
7 | Viimsi | 0
3 | Pärnu Sadam | 3
6 | Keila Coolbet | 2

Semifinals
1 | BC Kalev/Cramo | 3
5 | AVIS UTILITAS Rapla | 0
2 | Tartu Ülikool Maks & Moorits | 3
3 | Pärnu Sadam | 1

Finals
1 | BC Kalev/Cramo | 3
2 | Tartu Ülikool Maks & Moorits | 0
Third place
3 | Pärnu Sadam | 1
5 | AVIS UTILITAS Rapla | 3

== Quarterfinals ==
=== BC Kalev/Cramo vs. Tallinna Kalev/SNABB ===
| 23 April 2024 | BC Kalev/Cramo | 97–49 (Series: 1–0) | Tallinna Kalev/SNABB | Tallinn |
| 19:00 (GMT) | Scoring by quarter: 18–10, 23–13, 25–13, 31–13 |
| | Pts: Kurbas, Shephard 17; Rebs: Dorbek 10; Asts: Dorbek 12 | Box Score | Pts: Jaakson, Paiste 12; Rebs: Hardy 5 Asts: Jaakson, Hardy 3 | Arena: Kalev Sports Hall; Attendance: 402; Referees: Ivo Kitsing, Rauno Kobin, Indrek Kelement |

| 26 April 2024 | Tallinna Kalev/SNABB | 70–75 (Series: 0–2) | BC Kalev/Cramo | Tallinn |
| 19:00 (GMT) | Scoring by quarter: 19–24, 15–21, 21–16, 15–14 |
| | Pts: Hardy 17; Rebs: Keedus 6 Asts: Paiste 4 | Box Score | Pts: Jurkatamm 16; Rebs: Böckler, Hermet 9 Asts: Kaukiainen 6 | Arena: Nord Sports Hall; Attendance: 92; Referees: Hendrik Laas, Risto Visnapuu, Egert Tiidor |

| 29 April 2024 | BC Kalev/Cramo | 86–59 (Series: 3–0) | Tallinna Kalev/SNABB | Tallinn |
| 19:00 (GMT) | Scoring by quarter: 19–11, 26–23, 14–5, 27–20 |
| | Pts: Suárez 14; Rebs: Böckler 7 Asts: Shungu 9 | Box Score | Pts: Campbell 20; Rebs: Hardy 5 Asts: Hardy 3 | Arena: Kalev Sports Hall; Attendance: 361; Referees: Mihkel Männiste, Ranno Konks, Indrek Kelement |

=== Tartu Ülikool Maks & Moorits vs. Viimsi ===
| 24 April 2024 | Tartu Ülikool Maks & Moorits | 105–65 (Series: 1–0) | Viimsi | Tartu |
| 19:00 (GMT) | Scoring by quarter: 22–24, 29–10, 27–11, 27–20 |
| | Pts: Veideman 21; Rebs: Mālmanis 8 Asts: three players 4 | Box Score | Pts: Hint 18; Rebs: Verhoeven 12; Asts: Verhoeven 5 | Arena: University of Tartu Sports Hall; Attendance: 766; Referees: Mart Uuehendrik, Ivo Kitsing, Egert Tiidor |

| 26 April 2024 | Viimsi | 77–85 (Series: 0–2) | Tartu Ülikool Maks & Moorits | Viimsi |
| 19:00 (GMT) | Scoring by quarter: 16–21, 15–21, 24–24, 22–19 |
| | Pts: Vaaks 18; Rebs: Verhoeven 7 Asts: Hint 5 | Box Score | Pts: Mālmanis 16; Rebs: Rozītis 9 Asts: Harris 7 | Arena: Forus Sports Center; Attendance: 483; Referees: Rainis Värv, Ranno Konks, Aleksei Mohov |

| 29 April 2024 | Tartu Ülikool Maks & Moorits | 72–65 (Series: 3–0) | Viimsi | Tartu |
| 19:00 (GMT) | Scoring by quarter: 15–18, 25–15, 10–10, 22–22 |
| | Pts: Mālmanis 22; Rebs: Mālmanis 15; Asts: three players 3 | Box Score | Pts: Vaaks 26; Rebs: Verhoeven 9 Asts: three players 3 | Arena: University of Tartu Sports Hall; Attendance: 724; Referees: Mart Uuehendrik, Rauno Kobin, Risto Visnapuu |

=== Pärnu Sadam vs. Keila Coolbet ===
| 24 April 2024 | Pärnu Sadam | 79–71 (Series: 1–0) | Keila Coolbet | Pärnu |
| 19:00 (GMT) | Scoring by quarter: 22–20, 19–9, 22–21, 16–21 |
| | Pts: Dijkstra 25; Rebs: Post 13; Asts: Post 9 | Box Score | Pts: Kasemets 23; Rebs: Krestinin 9 Asts: Johnson 6 | Arena: Pärnu Sports Hall; Attendance: 849; Referees: Mihkel Männiste, Hendrik Laas, Aleksei Mohov |

| 26 April 2024 | Keila Coolbet | 93–69 (Series: 1–1) | Pärnu Sadam | Keila |
| 19:30 (GMT) | Scoring by quarter: 22–18, 24–19, 27–20, 20–12 |
| | Pts: Žunda 23; Rebs: Krestinin 11; Asts: Johnson 5 | Box Score | Pts: Barnies 11; Rebs: Jonāts 5 Asts: Post 5 | Arena: Keila Health Center; Attendance: 719; Referees: Aare Halliko, Mart Uuehendrik, Indrek Kelement |

| 28 April 2024 | Pärnu Sadam | 60–53 (Series: 2–1) | Keila Coolbet | Pärnu |
| 17:00 (GMT) | Scoring by quarter: 14–11, 13–7, 12–20, 21–15 |
| | Pts: Post 13; Rebs: Post 8 Asts: Post 5 | Box Score | Pts: Žunda 23; Rebs: Kasemets 10; Asts: Johnson 3 | Arena: Pärnu Sports Hall; Attendance: 820; Referees: Rainis Värv, Ivo Kitsing, Risto Visnapuu |

| 1 May 2024 | Keila Coolbet | 80–79(OT) (Series: 2–2) | Pärnu Sadam | Keila |
| 19:30 (GMT) | Scoring by quarter: 11–13, 25–14, 20–18, 10–21, Overtime: 14–13 |
| | Pts: Kasemets, Žunda 18; Rebs: Kasemets 10; Asts: Johnson 9 | Box Score | Pts: Tamm 15; Rebs: Tamm 8 Asts: Post 7 | Arena: Keila Health Center; Attendance: 865; Referees: Aare Halliko, Aleksei Mohov, Ranno Konks |

| 2 May 2024 | Pärnu Sadam | 87–67 (Series: 3–2) | Keila Coolbet | Pärnu |
| 19:00 (GMT) | Scoring by quarter: 18–17, 17–9, 27–19, 25–22 |
| | Pts: Dijkstra 20; Rebs: Barnies 10; Asts: Post 9 | Box Score | Pts: Serheyev 17; Rebs: Serheyev 6 Asts: Johnson 8 | Arena: Pärnu Sports Hall; Attendance: 1,312; Referees: Mihkel Männiste, Rainis Värv, Hendrik Laas |

=== TalTech/OPTIBET vs. AVIS UTILITAS Rapla ===
| 25 April 2024 | TalTech/OPTIBET | 82–75(OT) (Series: 1–0) | AVIS UTILITAS Rapla | Tallinn |
| 18:30 (GMT) | Scoring by quarter: 21–20, 13–14, 12–9, 20–23, Overtime: 16–9 |
| | Pts: Ilves 19; Rebs: Ilves 12; Asts: Metsalu 5 | Box Score | Pts: Paasoja, Hunter 15; Rebs: Niits 10; Asts: Paasoja, Hunter 5 | Arena: TalTech Sports Hall; Attendance: 839; Referees: Aare Halliko, Rainis Värv, Ranno Konks |

| 27 April 2024 | AVIS UTILITAS Rapla | 77–76 (Series: 1–1) | TalTech/OPTIBET | Rapla |
| 17:00 (GMT) | Scoring by quarter: 19–26, 21–21, 16–16, 21–13 |
| | Pts: Hunter, Pope 14; Rebs: Niits 14; Asts: Hunter 5 | Box Score | Pts: Suurorg 18; Rebs: Metsalu 10; Asts: Metsalu 4 | Arena: Sadolin Sports Hall; Attendance: 882; Referees: Mihkel Männiste, Ivo Kitsing, Rauno Kobin |

| 29 April 2024 | TalTech/OPTIBET | 92–85 (Series: 2–1) | AVIS UTILITAS Rapla | Tallinn |
| 18:30 (GMT) | Scoring by quarter: 21–15, 20–26, 24–23, 27–21 |
| | Pts: Ilves 16; Rebs: Kuuba 9 Asts: Pehka 8 | Box Score | Pts: Paasoja, Hunter 21; Rebs: Niits 7 Asts: Paasoja 5 | Arena: TalTech Sports Hall; Attendance: 814; Referees: Aare Halliko, Hendrik Laas, Aleksei Mohov |

| 2 May 2024 | AVIS UTILITAS Rapla | 80–74 (Series: 2–2) | TalTech/OPTIBET | Rapla |
| 19:00 (GMT) | Scoring by quarter: 18–18, 21–21, 18–15, 23–20 |
| | Pts: Hunter 26; Rebs: Pope 10; Asts: Paasoja 5 | Box Score | Pts: Suurorg 21; Rebs: Ilves 7 Asts: Ilves 6 | Arena: Sadolin Sports Hall; Attendance: 601; Referees: Aare Halliko, Mart Uuehendrik, Ranno Konks |

| 5 May 2024 | TalTech/OPTIBET | 80–81 (Series: 2–3) | AVIS UTILITAS Rapla | Tallinn |
| 17:00 (GMT) | Scoring by quarter: 24–14, 8–23, 26–21, 22–23 |
| | Pts: Metsalu 27; Rebs: Kuuba 10; Asts: Pehka 6 | Box Score | Pts: Paasoja, Hunter 21; Rebs: Niits 15; Asts: Hunter 4 | Arena: TalTech Sports Hall; Attendance: 1,123; Referees: Aare Halliko, Mihkel Männiste, Ivo Kitsing |

== Semifinals ==
=== BC Kalev/Cramo vs. AVIS UTILITAS Rapla ===
| 8 May 2024 | BC Kalev/Cramo | 106–51 (Series: 1–0) | AVIS UTILITAS Rapla | Tallinn |
| 19:30 (GMT) | Scoring by quarter: 26–10, 34–18, 19–10, 27–13 |
| | Pts: Suárez 21; Rebs: Nurger 7 Asts: Jurkatamm, Kaukiainen 8 | Box Score | Pts: Shevchenko, Hunter 9 Rebs: Tomić 8 Asts: Hunter 4 | Arena: Kalev Sports Hall; Attendance: 632; Referees: Hendrik Laas, Rainis Värv, Aleksei Mohov |

| 10 May 2024 | AVIS UTILITAS Rapla | 66–110 (Series: 0–2) | BC Kalev/Cramo | Rapla |
| 19:00 (GMT) | Scoring by quarter: 11–27, 16–22, 20–31, 19–30 |
| | Pts: Paasoja 15; Rebs: Tomić 6 Asts: Paasoja 5 | Box Score | Pts: Suárez 20; Rebs: Jurkatamm 10; Asts: Jurkatamm | Arena: Sadolin Sports Hall; Attendance: 528; Referees: Aare Halliko, Ivo Kitsing, Risto Visnapuu |

| 12 May 2024 | BC Kalev/Cramo | 87–56 (Series: 3–0) | AVIS UTILITAS Rapla | Tallinn |
| 18:00 (GMT) | Scoring by quarter: 21–21, 25–10, 26–8, 15–17 |
| | Pts: Suárez 21; Rebs: Suárez 10; Asts: Shungu 10 | Box Score | Pts: Niits 21; Rebs: Tomić 9 Asts: Niits, Paasoja 4 | Arena: Kalev Sports Hall; Attendance: 363; Referees: Mihkel Männiste, Hendrik Laas, Ranno Konks |

=== Tartu Ülikool Maks & Moorits vs. Pärnu Sadam ===
| 7 May 2024 | Tartu Ülikool Maks & Moorits | 80–77 (Series: 1–0) | Pärnu Sadam | Tartu |
| 19:00 (GMT) | Scoring by quarter: 22–20, 22–15, 17–18, 19–24 |
| | Pts: Rosenthal, Rozītis 16; Rebs: Rozītis 14; Asts: Harris 12 | Box Score | Pts: Post 18; Rebs: Tamm 8 Asts: Post 10 | Arena: University of Tartu Sports Hall; Attendance: 1,126; Referees: Mihkel Männiste, Mart Uuehendrik, Risto Visnapuu |

| 9 May 2024 | Pärnu Sadam | 78–86 (Series: 0–2) | Tartu Ülikool Maks & Moorits | Pärnu |
| 19:00 (GMT) | Scoring by quarter: 19–17, 22–22, 23–22, 14–25 |
| | Pts: Post 22; Rebs: Tamm 5 Asts: Post 13 | Box Score | Pts: Rosenthal 22; Rebs: Eelmäe 8 Asts: Rosenthal 6 | Arena: Pärnu Sports Hall; Attendance: 1,211; Referees: Rainis Värv, Ivo Kitsing, Ranno Konks |

| 11 May 2024 | Tartu Ülikool Maks & Moorits | 75–78 (Series: 2–1) | Pärnu Sadam | Tartu |
| 19:00 (GMT) | Scoring by quarter: 21–24, 15–25, 21–12, 18–17 |
| | Pts: Rosenthal 23; Rebs: Rozītis 9 Asts: Rosenthal, Harris 4 | Box Score | Pts: Post 19; Rebs: Jonāts 10; Asts: Post 12 | Arena: University of Tartu Sports Hall; Attendance: 1,361; Referees: Aare Halliko, Mart Uuehendrik, Aleksei Mohov |

| 13 May 2024 | Pärnu Sadam | 63–71 (Series: 1–3) | Tartu Ülikool Maks & Moorits | Pärnu |
| 19:00 (GMT) | Scoring by quarter: 11–16, 23–23, 11–21, 18–10 |
| | Pts: Tamm 19; Rebs: Barnies 7 Asts: Post 7 | Box Score | Pts: Märt Rosenthal 27; Rebs: Mālmanis 13; Asts: Harris 8 | Arena: Pärnu Sports Hall; Attendance: 1,368; Referees: Mihkel Männiste, Hendrik Laas, Aleksei Mohov |

== Third place games ==
=== Pärnu Sadam vs. AVIS UTILITAS Rapla ===
| 17 May 2024 | Pärnu Sadam | 59–68 (Series: 0–1) | AVIS UTILITAS Rapla | Pärnu |
| 19:00 (GMT) | Scoring by quarter: 12–12, 23–22, 19–19, 5–15 |
| | Pts: Alston 18; Rebs: Dijkstra 7 Asts: Post 5 | Box Score | Pts: Niits 15; Rebs: Niits 12; Asts: Paasoja, Hunter 7 | Arena: Pärnu Sports Hall; Attendance: 712; Referees: Aare Halliko, Ivo Kitsing, Ranno Konks |

| 21 May 2024 | AVIS UTILITAS Rapla | 55–65 (Series: 1–1) | Pärnu Sadam | Rapla |
| 19:00 (GMT) | Scoring by quarter: 21–16, 10–17, 7–13, 17–19 |
| | Pts: Hunter 14; Rebs: Niits 11; Asts: Paasoja, Hunter 4 | Box Score | Pts: Alston 14; Rebs: Barnies 13; Asts: Post 6 | Arena: Sadolin Sports Hall; Attendance: 703; Referees: Mihkel Männiste, Rainis Värv, Aleksei Mohov |

| 23 May 2024 | Pärnu Sadam | 65–68 (Series: 1–2) | AVIS UTILITAS Rapla | Pärnu |
| 19:00 (GMT) | Scoring by quarter: 12–8, 8–21, 26–21, 19–18 |
| | Pts: Post 22; Rebs: Post 9 Asts: Post 9 | Box Score | Pts: Hunter 17; Rebs: Shevchenko 8 Asts: Hunter 6 | Arena: Pärnu Sports Hall; Attendance: 780; Referees: Mart Uuehendrik, Hendrik Laas, Ranno Konks |

| 25 May 2024 | AVIS UTILITAS Rapla | 82–66 (Series: 3–1) | Pärnu Sadam | Rapla |
| 17:00 (GMT) | Scoring by quarter: 28–18, 15–12, 26–21, 13–15 |
| | Pts: Shevchenko 21; Rebs: Tomić 9 Asts: Paasoja 11 | Box Score | Pts: Post, Aav 12; Rebs: Valge 5 Asts: Post 3 | Arena: Sadolin Sports Hall; Attendance: 607; Referees: Aare Halliko, Mart Uuehendrik, Aleksei Mohov |

== Finals ==
=== BC Kalev/Cramo vs. Tartu Ülikool Maks & Moorits ===
| 22 May 2024 | BC Kalev/Cramo | 73–67 (Series: 1–0) | Tartu Ülikool Maks & Moorits | Tallinn |
| 19:30 (GMT) | Scoring by quarter: 19–17, 17–15, 14–22, 23–13 |
| | Pts: Shungu 16; Rebs: Nurger, Shungu 8 Asts: Kaukiainen 4 | Box Score | Pts: Rosenthal, Kitsing 12; Rebs: Mālmanis 7 Asts: Harris 5 | Arena: Kalev Sports Hall; Attendance: 1,214; Referees: Aare Halliko, Mihkel Männiste, Indrek Kelement |

| 25 May 2024 | Tartu Ülikool Maks & Moorits | 61–82 (Series: 0–2) | BC Kalev/Cramo | Tartu |
| 19:00 (GMT) | Scoring by quarter: 15–15, 11–20, 23–27, 12–20 |
| | Pts: Rosenthal 12; Rebs: Rosenthal, Rozītis 7 Asts: Harris 5 | Box Score | Pts: Jurkatamm 17; Rebs: Hermet 10; Asts: Shungu 5 | Arena: University of Tartu Sports Hall; Attendance: 2,338; Referees: Ivo Kitsing, Hendrik Laas, Rainis Värv |

| 28 May 2024 | BC Kalev/Cramo | 79–61 (Series: 3–0) | Tartu Ülikool Maks & Moorits | Tallinn |
| 19:30 (GMT) | Scoring by quarter: 18–17, 17–10, 22–14, 22–20 |
| | Pts: Shungu 23; Rebs: Hermet 10; Asts: Suárez 4 | Box Score | Pts: Rosenthal 10; Rebs: Rosenthal 13; Asts: three players 3 | Arena: Tondiraba Sports Center; Attendance: 1,811; Referees: Mihkel Männiste, Aleksei Mohov, Ranno Konks |

== Awards ==
=== KML Finals MVP ===
| Player | Club | Ref. |
|---|---|---|
| (United States) Ben Shungu | (Estonia) BC Kalev/Cramo | |

=== All-KML Team ===
| Position | Player | Team |
|---|---|---|
| PG | (Estonia) Siim-Markus Post | Pärnu Sadam |
| SG | (Estonia) Mikk Jurkatamm | BC Kalev/Cramo |
| SG | (Estonia) Märt Rosenthal | Tartu Ülikool Maks & Moorits |
| SF | (Estonia) Tormi Niits | AVIS UTILITAS Rapla |
| C | (Chile) Manny Suárez | BC Kalev/Cramo |

== Attendances ==
=== Average attendances ===
| Pos | Team | Total | High | Low | Average |
|---|---|---|---|---|---|
| 1 | Tartu Ülikool Maks & Moorits | 6,315 | 2,338 | 724 | 1,263 |
| 2 | Pärnu Sadam | 7,052 | 1,368 | 712 | 1,007 |
| 3 | TalTech/OPTIBET | 2,276 | 1,123 | 814 | 925 |
| 4 | BC Kalev/Cramo | 4,783 | 1,811 | 361 | 797 |
| 5 | Keila Coolbet | 1,584 | 865 | 719 | 792 |
| 6 | AVIS UTILITAS Rapla | 3,321 | 882 | 528 | 664 |
| 7 | Viimsi | 483 | 483 | 483 | 483 |
| 8 | BC Tallinna Kalev/SNABB | 92 | 92 | 92 | 92 |
| | League total | 25,906 | 2,338 | 92 | 753 |

Source: basket.ee

== Statistics ==
=== Points ===
| Rank | Name | Team | Games | Points | PPG |
|---|---|---|---|---|---|
| 1 | (Latvia) Kārlis Žunda | Keila Coolbet | 5 | 85 | 17.00 |
| 2 | (Estonia) Kristen Kasemets | Keila Coolbet | 5 | 84 | 16.80 |
| 3 | (Estonia) Stefan Vaaks | Viimsi | 3 | 49 | 16.33 |

=== Rebounds ===
| Rank | Name | Team | Games | Rebounds | RPG |
|---|---|---|---|---|---|
| 1 | (United States) Tydus Verhoeven | Viimsi | 3 | 28 | 9.33 |
| 2 | (Estonia) Tormi Niits | AVIS UTILITAS Rapla | 12 | 102 | 8.50 |
| 3 | (Latvia) Dāvis Rozītis | Tartu Ülikool Maks & Moorits | 10 | 76 | 7.60 |

=== Assists ===
| Rank | Name | Team | Games | Assists | APG |
|---|---|---|---|---|---|
| 1 | (Estonia) Siim-Markus Post | Pärnu Sadam | 13 | 100 | 7.69 |
| 2 | (United States) Kevin Johnson | Keila Coolbet | 5 | 31 | 6.20 |
| 3 | (United States) Devin Lee Harris | Tartu Ülikool Maks & Moorits | 10 | 55 | 5.50 |

== See also ==
- 2023–24 Latvian–Estonian Basketball League
