= Linards Jaunzems =

Latvian basketball player

No. 23 – KR
- Position: Small forward / power forward
- League: Úrvalsdeild karla

Personal information
- Born: October 3, 1995 (age 31) Bauska, Latvia
- Listed height: 6 ft 7 in (2.01 m)
- Listed weight: 216 lb (98 kg)

Career information
- Playing career: 2014–present

Career history
- 2014–2019: Latvijas Universitāte
- 2019–2020: BK Ventspils
- 2020–2021: Pärnu Sadam
- 2021–2024: BK Ventspils
- 2024–present: KR

Career highlights
- LBL MVP (2024)
Medals
Men's basketball
Representing Latvia
Summer Universiade
Bronze medal – third place	2017 Taipei	Team competition

Linards Jaunzems (born October 3, 1995) is a Latvian professional basketball player who currently plays for KR. He is 2.00 m (6 ft 6.75 in) and can play small forward and power forward positions.

== Professional career ==
For the 2023–2024 season, he was named the MVP of the Latvijas Basketbola līga (LBL) after averaging 16.5 points and 7.7 rebounds per game.

In September 2024, Jaunzems signed with KR of the Icelandic Úrvalsdeild karla.

== National team career ==
Jaunzems has represented Latvia in 2015 FIBA Europe Under-20 Championship.
