= Mikk Jurkatamm =

Estonian professional basketball player

No. 7 – Victoria Libertas Pesaro
- Position: Shooting guard
- League: Serie A2

Personal information
- Born: 18 September 2000 (age 26) Tallinn, Estonia
- Listed height: 1.96 m (6 ft 5 in)
- Listed weight: 81 kg (179 lb)

Career information
- Playing career: 2018–present

Career history
- 2018: Virtus Bologna
- 2018–2020: Basket Ravenna
- 2021: Benedetto XIV Cento
- 2021–2022: TalTech
- 2022–2023: Treviso Basket
- 2023–2024: BC Kalev
- 2024–2026: Scandone Avellino
- 2026–present: Victoria Libertas Pesaro

Career highlights
- Estonian League champion (2024); KML All-Star Five (2024); Estonian Cup winner (2024)

Mikk Jurkatamm (born 18 September 2000) is an Estonian professional basketball player for Victoria Libertas Pesaro of the Italian Serie A2. He also represents the Estonian national team. Standing at 1.96 m (6 ft 5 in), he plays at the shooting guard position.
