= P.J. Pipes =

American basketball player

Shawn O'Neal Pipes
No. 2 – Bosna
- Position: Point guard
- League: ABA League; EuroCup

Personal information
- Born: March 20, 1999 (age 27) Woodridge, Illinois, U.S.
- Listed height: 6 ft 2 in (1.88 m)
- Listed weight: 190 lb (86 kg)

Career information
- High school: Lemont High School (Lemont, Illinois)
- College: Green Bay (2017-21); Santa Clara (2021–2022)
- NBA draft: 2022: undrafted
- Playing career: 2022–present

Career history
- 2022–2023: USK Praha
- 2023-2024: Legia Warsaw
- 2024: VEF Rīga
- 2024–2025: Bursaspor
- 2025: Anwil Włocławek
- 2025–2026: Büyükçekmece
- 2026–present: Bosna

Career highlights
- Latvian Basketball Cup winner (2024); LBL champion (2024)

Shawn O'Neal Pipes Jr. (born March 20, 1999) also known as P.J. Pipes, is an American professional basketball player for Bosna of the ABA League and the EuroCup. He played college basketball for the Green Bay Phoenix and the Santa Clara Broncos. Standing at a height of 6 ft 2 in (1.88 m), Pipes plays the point guard position.

== Professional career ==
After graduating from Santa Clara, Pipes started his pro career in Czech Republic, playing for historic team USK Praha. In 2023, Pipes signed for Legia Warsaw and for the first time played in international club competition as well.

After leaving Legia mid-season, he signed with VEF Rīga.

On July 8, 2024, he signed with Bursaspor of the Basketbol Süper Ligi (BSL).

On February 1, 2025, he signed with Anwil Włocławek of the Polish Basketball League (PLK).

On August 19, 2025, he signed with ONVO Büyükçekmece of the Basketbol Süper Ligi (BSL).
