= Artūras Valeika =

Lithuanian basketball player (born 1985)

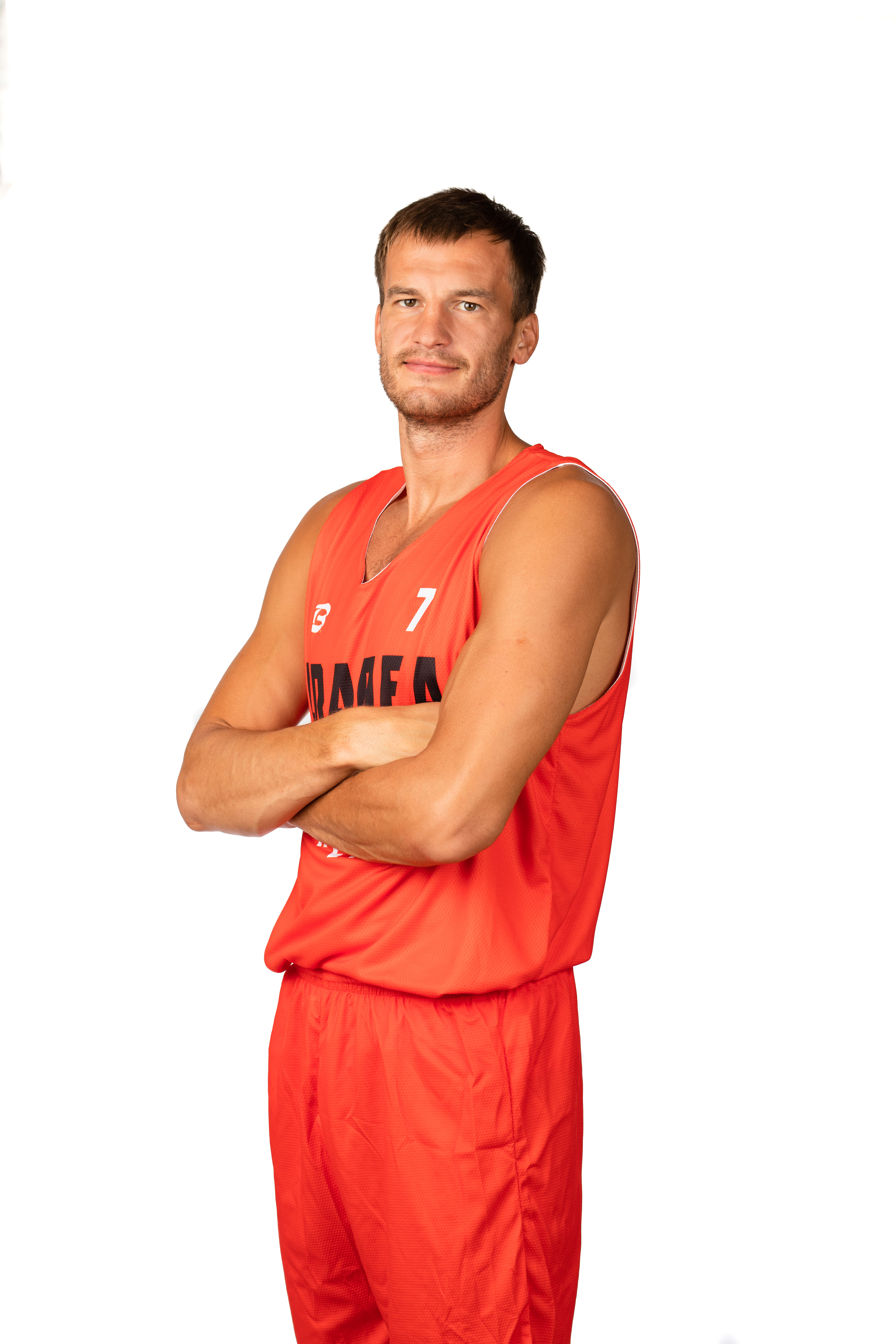
- Artūras Valeika, in CSM Oradea uniform - 2020

Free agent
- Position: Power forward

Personal information
- Born: 11 August 1985 (age 41) Vilnius, Lithuanian SSR, Soviet Union
- Listed height: 2.06 m (6 ft 9 in)
- Listed weight: 100 kg (220 lb)

Career information
- College: Midland (2004–2006); Weber State (2006–2008)
- NBA draft: 2008: undrafted
- Playing career: 2008–present

Career history
- 2008–2009: Eisbären Bremerhaven
- 2009–2010: SK Valmiera
- 2010: BC Alytus
- 2010–2011: Perlas Vilnius
- 2011: SK Valmiera
- 2011: Cáceres Ciudad del Baloncesto
- 2011–2012: Neptūnas Klaipėda
- 2012–2014: Rūdupis Prienai / TonyBet Prienai
- 2014–2016: Lietuvos rytas Vilnius
- 2015–2016: →Lietkabelis Panevėžys
- 2016–2017: Vytautas Prienai-Birštonas
- 2017–2021: CSM Oradea
- 2021-2022: Pärnu Sadam
- 2022-2023: CBet Jonava

Career highlights
- Romanian SuperCup Champion (2020); Liga Națională Champion (2019,2020); LKL All-Star (2014); First-team All-Big Sky (2008)

Artūras Valeika (born 11 August 1985) is a Lithuanian professional basketball player for CBet Jonava of the Lithuanian Basketball League. He is 2 times champion in Romania with CSM Oradea, and one time SuperCup winner with the ”Red Lions”.

Born in Vilnius, Lithuanian SSR, Soviet Union, Valeika started his career in 2003 playing for Vilnius SSK-Nord/LB Draudimas which was playing in the second Lithuanian league LKAL. He spent four years playing college basketball in the United States, first at Midland College and then at Weber State University. He averaged 10.2 rebounds per game during his senior season (2007–08), which led the Big Sky Conference. Valeika also played for the U20 Lithuanian National Team in 2005.

After he finished his studies, Artūras returned to Europe and joined Eisbären Bremerhaven basketball club playing in Germany. However, there he didn't show good performance and after season Valeika headed to Latvia playing for SK Valmiera. After a good season he decided to come back and play in his homeland. However, he wasn't successful to settle in 2010-2011 club and migrated through many clubs. He started the season playing for BC Alytus, however in October he decided to leave that club and joined BC Perlas. This time he played there until January and then returned to SK Valmiera after one season. Still unhappy being there, he joined Spanish club Cáceres 2016, where he finished the 2010–2011 season. In summer 2011, Valeika signed a contract with Lithuanian club BC Neptūnas. After two solid seasons in BC Prienai, he signed with BC Lietuvos rytas in the summer of 2014. After a season with Rytas, he was loaned to BC Lietkabelis.

== Statistics ==
=== College Statistics ===
Season Averages
Season	Team	G	PTS	REB	AST	STL	BLK	FG%	3P%	FT%	MIN	TO
2006–07	Weber State Wildcats	32	8.0	6.5	1.0	0.7	0.5	.579	.348	.670	26.6	1.8
2007–08	Weber State Wildcats	30	9.9	10.2	1.2	0.8	1.2	.489	.371	.701	29.8	2.1
Totals:		62	8.9	8.3	1.1	0.7	0.8	.528	.364	.686	28.2	2.0
