= Kamari Murphy =

American basketball player

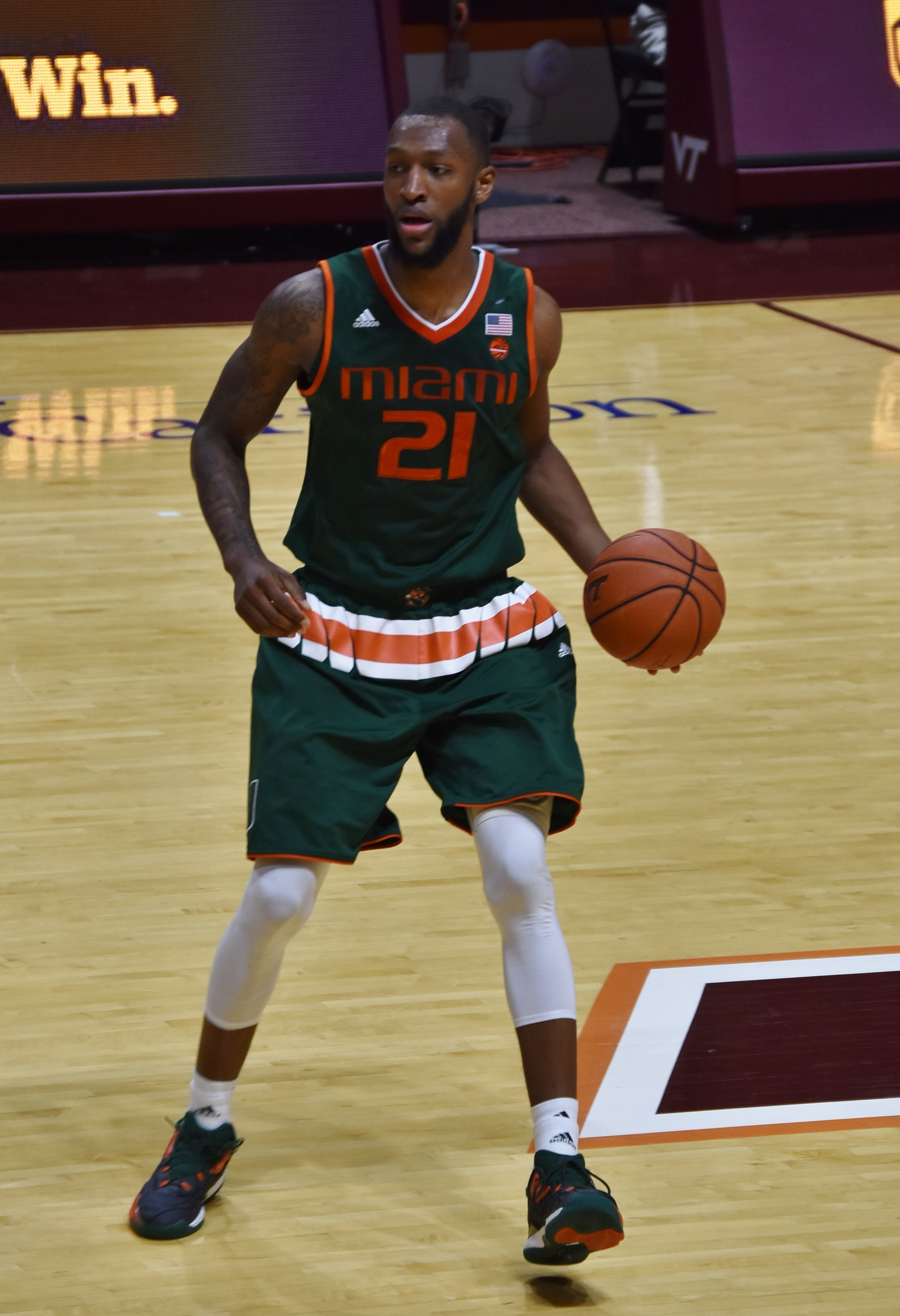

Free agent
- Position: Power forward

Personal information
- Born: December 14, 1993 (age 32)
- Listed height: 6 ft 9 in (2.06 m)
- Listed weight: 218 lb (99 kg)

Career information
- High school: Abraham Lincoln (Brooklyn, New York); IMG Academy (Bradenton, Florida)
- College: Oklahoma State (2012–2014); Miami (Florida) (2015–2017)
- NBA draft: 2017: undrafted
- Playing career: 2017–present

Career history
- 2017–2019: Long Island Nets
- 2019–2020: Rasta Vechta
- 2020–2021: Fraport Skyliners
- 2021–2022: Kalev/Cramo
- 2022–2023: GTK Gliwice
- 2023–2024: Scaligera Verona
- 2024–2025: Zastal Zielona Góra
- Stats at Basketball Reference

Kamari Michael Murphy (born December 14, 1993) is an American professional basketball player who last played for Zastal Zielona Góra of the Polish Basketball League (PLK). He played college basketball for Oklahoma State and Miami (Fla.).

== Early life ==
Murphy grew up in East New York, Brooklyn and began playing basketball at the age of nine after his stepfather forced him to stop playing video games. Murphy played high school basketball at Abraham Lincoln High School in Brooklyn, New York alongside Isaiah Whitehead. Murphy had 14 points, 16 rebounds and four blocks in a 56–54 win over Cardozo High School in the 2011 PSAL tournament semifinals. Murphy was ranked the No. 6 prospect in New York by HoopScoop in 2011. He played at IMG Academy as a postgraduate. He considered Miami for college, but was dissuaded because of the 2011 University of Miami athletics scandal involving booster Nevin Shapiro, and ultimately committed to Oklahoma State.

== College career ==
As a freshman at Oklahoma State, Murphy started 15 games and averaged 3.8 points and 3.9 rebounds per game. Murphy averaged 6.1 points and 6.3 rebounds per game as a sophomore. However, he felt he was not "being used properly," and decided to transfer to the Miami Hurricanes, sitting out the 2014–15 season as a redshirt. As a junior, Murphy averaged 5.6 points and 6.0 rebounds per game. On December 3, 2016, Murphy had a career-high 14 points and pulled down 10 rebounds to help Miami defeat Wofford 74–57 in the HoopHall Miami Invitational and was selected as its most valuable player. Murphy started all 33 games as a senior, averaging 7.1 points, 7.3 rebounds and 0.7 blocks per game and posting four double-doubles.

== Professional career ==
After going undrafted in the 2017 NBA draft, Murphy signed a summer league deal with the Brooklyn Nets. He signed with the Nets in October 2017 but was waived before the season. He subsequently joined the G League Long Island Nets, contributing 21 points and 14 rebounds in his first game. Murphy signed with B.C. Oostende of the Belgian league in August 2018, but never joined the team due to an injury. He instead returned to Long Island. Murphy missed three games in February 2019 due to hip soreness. On February 27, Murphy posted 16 points, 10 rebounds, two blocks and one assist in a win over the Delaware Blue Coats. He averaged 8.7 points and 6.4 rebounds per game during the 2018–19 season. In July 2019, Murphy signed with Rasta Vechta of the German Basketball Bundesliga. On October 15, Murphy scored 15 points in a 89–76 win over Anwil Wloclawek. Due to the coronavirus pandemic, Murphy cancelled his contract with the club on March 23, 2020.

On September 26, 2020, he signed a 1+1 deal with the Fraport Skyliners. On August 1, 2021, he signed with Kalev/Cramo in the Latvian–Estonian Basketball League.

On July 22, 2022, he has signed with GTK Gliwice of the Polish Basketball League (PLK).

On July 17, 2024, he signed with Zastal Zielona Góra of the Polish Basketball League (PLK).
