= Andris Misters =

Latvian basketball player

BK Ogre
- Position: Shooting guard
- League: Latvian-Estonian Basketball League

Personal information
- Born: April 8, 1992 (age 34) Dobele, Latvia
- Listed height: 6 ft 5 in (1.96 m)
- Listed weight: 201 lb (91 kg)

Career information
- High school: St.Benedict's Prep (Newark, New Jersey)
- College: Southeastern Oklahoma State (2012–2013); Western Texas (2013–2014); Jacksonville (2014–2017)
- NBA draft: 2017: undrafted
- Playing career: 2017–present

Career history
- 2017–2019: VEF Rīga
- 2019–2021: Melilla Baloncesto
- 2021–2022: Pärnu Sadam
- 2022–2023: CSM Ploiești
- 2023-2024: M Basket Mažeikiai
- 2024-present: BK Ogre

Career highlights
- LBL champion (2019); KML champion (2022); KML Finals MVP (2022); NJCAA Academic All-American (2014)
Medals
Men's basketball
Representing Latvia
FIBA Europe Under-18 Championship
Bronze medal – third place	2010 Lithuania	U-18 Team

Andris Misters (born April 8, 1992) is a Latvian professional basketball player for BK Ogre of the Latvian-Estonian Basketball League. He plays as shooting guard.

== Background ==
Misters has represented the Latvian national team in four European youth championships.

Misters was once considered one of the top Latvian prospects for players born in 1992 and was invited to Fiva-Star Camp in Serbia in 2007. Overcame two major knee injuries (ACLs), first right after highschool, second before the college senior year, to pursue a professional basketball career.

In August 2017, he went on a try-out for Latvian champions VEF Riga and later signed a contract.
