= Brandon Childress (basketball) =

American basketball player

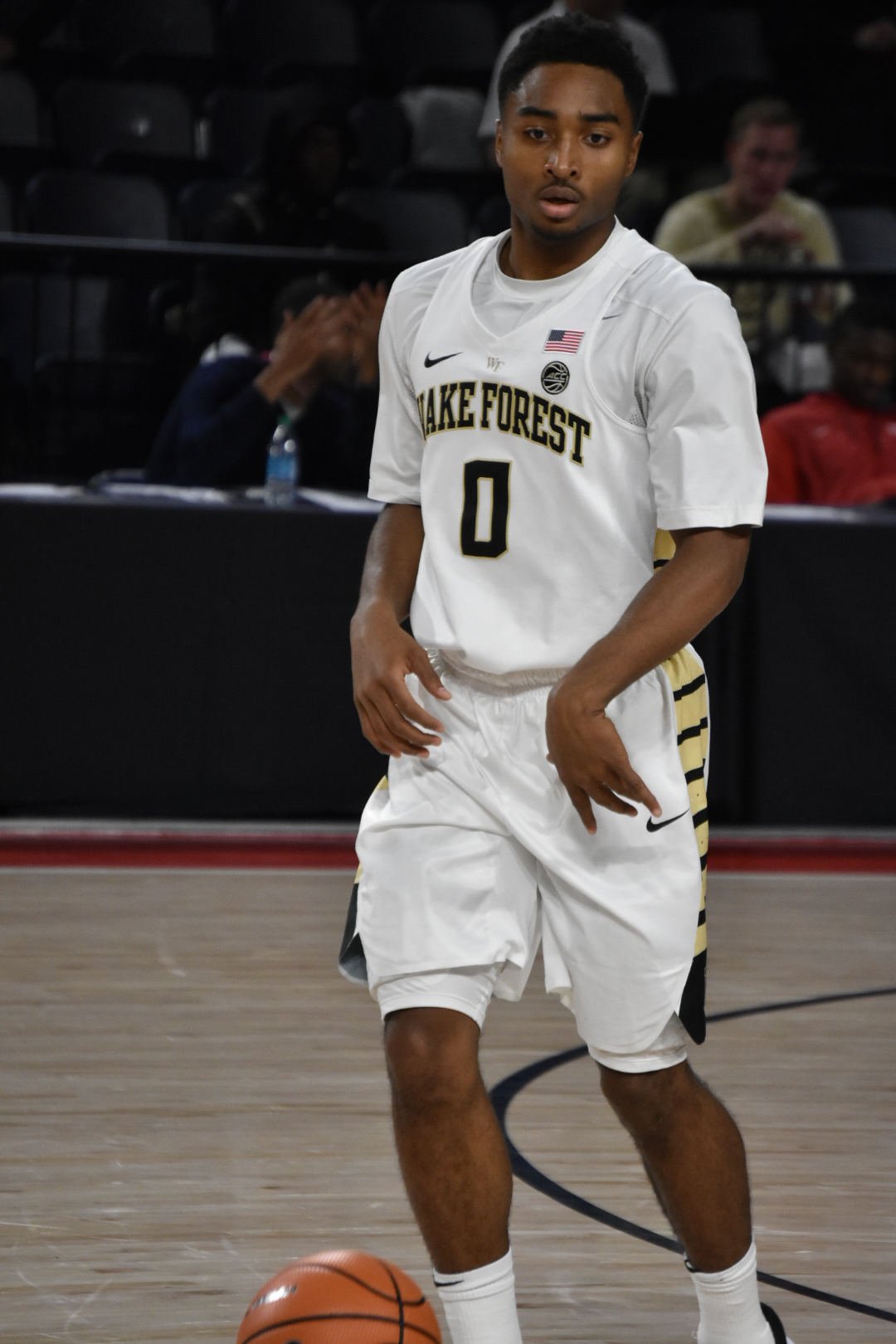
- Childress with Wake Forest in 2017

No. 0 – Obradoiro CAB
- Position: Point guard
- League: Liga ACB

Personal information
- Born: August 31, 1997 (age 29) Detroit, Michigan, U.S.
- Listed height: 6 ft 0 in (1.83 m)
- Listed weight: 195 lb (88 kg)

Career information
- High school: East Forsyth (Kernersville, North Carolina); Wesleyan Christian Academy (High Point, North Carolina)
- College: Wake Forest (2016–2020)
- NBA draft: 2020: undrafted
- Playing career: 2020–present

Career history
- 2020: Iraklis
- 2021: AVIS UTILITAS Rapla
- 2022: TalTech
- 2022–2023: Medi Bayreuth
- 2023–2024: Hakro Merlins Crailsheim
- 2024: Marineros de Puerto Plata
- 2024–2025: CBet Jonava
- 2025–2026: Bursaspor
- 2026–present: Obradoiro

Career highlights
- All-LKL Team (2025)

Brandon Reginald Childress (born August 31, 1997) is an American professional basketball player for Obradoiro of the Liga ACB. He played college basketball for the Wake Forest Demon Deacons.

== Early life ==
Childress was born in Detroit, Michigan, where his father was playing for the Detroit Pistons. In his childhood, his family moved to Prince George's County, Maryland. Childress first took interest in football and started playing basketball at age nine. In his first two years of high school, he played basketball for East Forsyth High School in Kernersville, North Carolina. He was a teammate of Riley LaRue, the son of former NBA player Rusty LaRue. Childress came off the bench as a freshman but became a key player as a sophomore, leading his team to the Frank Spencer Holiday Classic title. For his junior season, he transferred to Wesleyan Christian Academy in High Point, North Carolina, where he played alongside Harry Giles, one of the top recruits in the nation. As a senior, Childress was an NCISAA 3A All-State selection. He chose to play college basketball for Wake Forest over offers from Charlotte, East Carolina and Tulsa among others.

== College career ==
As a freshman at Wake Forest, Childress averaged 6.6 points and 2.2 assists per game. On January 23, 2018, he scored a sophomore season-high 18 points, 16 of which came in the second half, in an 84–70 loss to fourth-ranked Duke. As a sophomore, Childress averaged 9.1 points and 3.6 assists per game. He became his team's starting point guard in his junior season, with the departure of Bryant Crawford. On January 5, 2019, Childress scored a season-high 28 points, shooting 7-of-10 from three-point range, in a 92–79 loss to Georgia Tech. Two weeks later, he scored 28 points for a second time in an 87–71 loss to Virginia Tech. Childress averaged 14.7 points and four assists per game as a junior, leading Wake Forest in scoring, assists and steals. On December 7, 2019, he scored a career-high 30 points in a 91–82 loss to NC State. On February 25, 2020, Childress hit the game-tying three-pointer at the end of regulation and scored 13 of his 17 points during two overtimes in a 113–101 upset of Duke, Wake Forest's first win against the Blue Devils in almost six years. As a senior, Childress averaged 15.6 points and 4.6 assists per game, leading his team in scoring, assists and steals, and was an All-Atlantic Coast Conference (ACC) Honorable Mention selection.

== Professional career ==
After going undrafted on the 2020 NBA draft, Childress signed with Iraklis of the Greek Basket League on July 24, 2020. He left the team in December. In February 2021 he signed with AVIS UTILITAS Rapla in Latvian-Estonian Basketball League and helped the team to win bronze in Estonian Championship. In February 2022 he signed with another Estonian team TalTech/Optibet. On June 21, 2022, Childress signed with Medi Bayreuth of the German Basketball Bundesliga. In October 2023 he signed with another Basketball Bundesliga team, Hakro Merlins Crailsheim.

On October 26, 2024, Childress joined the Sioux Falls Skyforce of the NBA G League after being selected in the 2024 NBA G League draft. However, he was waived on November 7.

On December 22, 2024, Childress signed with CBet Jonava of the Lithuanian Basketball League (LKL).

On July 24, 2025, he signed with Bursaspor Basketbol of the Basketbol Süper Ligi (BSL).

On July 26, 2026, he signed with Obradoiro of the Liga ACB.

== Career statistics ==
Legend
GP	Games played	GS	Games started	MPG	Minutes per game
FG%	Field goal percentage	3P%	3-point field goal percentage	FT%	Free throw percentage
RPG	Rebounds per game	APG	Assists per game	SPG	Steals per game
BPG	Blocks per game	PPG	Points per game	**Bold**	Career high

=== College ===
Year	Team	GP	GS	MPG	FG%	3P%	FT%	RPG	APG	SPG	BPG	PPG
2016–17	Wake Forest	**33**	0	21.5	.356	.351	.774	2.2	2.2	.8	.0	6.6
2017–18	Wake Forest	30	5	26.2	.379	**.379**	**.838**	2.7	3.6	1.0	.0	9.1
2018–19	Wake Forest	31	**30**	**36.4**	.383	.368	.796	**3.8**	4.0	**1.5**	.0	14.7
2019–20	Wake Forest	30	**30**	35.4	**.404**	.325	.809	3.0	**4.6**	1.2	.0	**15.6**
Career		124	65	29.7	.385	.355	.803	2.9	3.6	1.1	.0	11.4

== Personal life ==
His father, Randolph Childress, was a standout basketball player at Wake Forest and competed professionally for 16 years, with stints in the NBA. Randolph is now an assistant coach for Wake Forest. Childress and his father are the highest scoring father-son duo in ACC history and the sixth to score at least 3,000 points for the same NCAA Division I school.
