= Donovan Jackson =

American football player (born 2002)

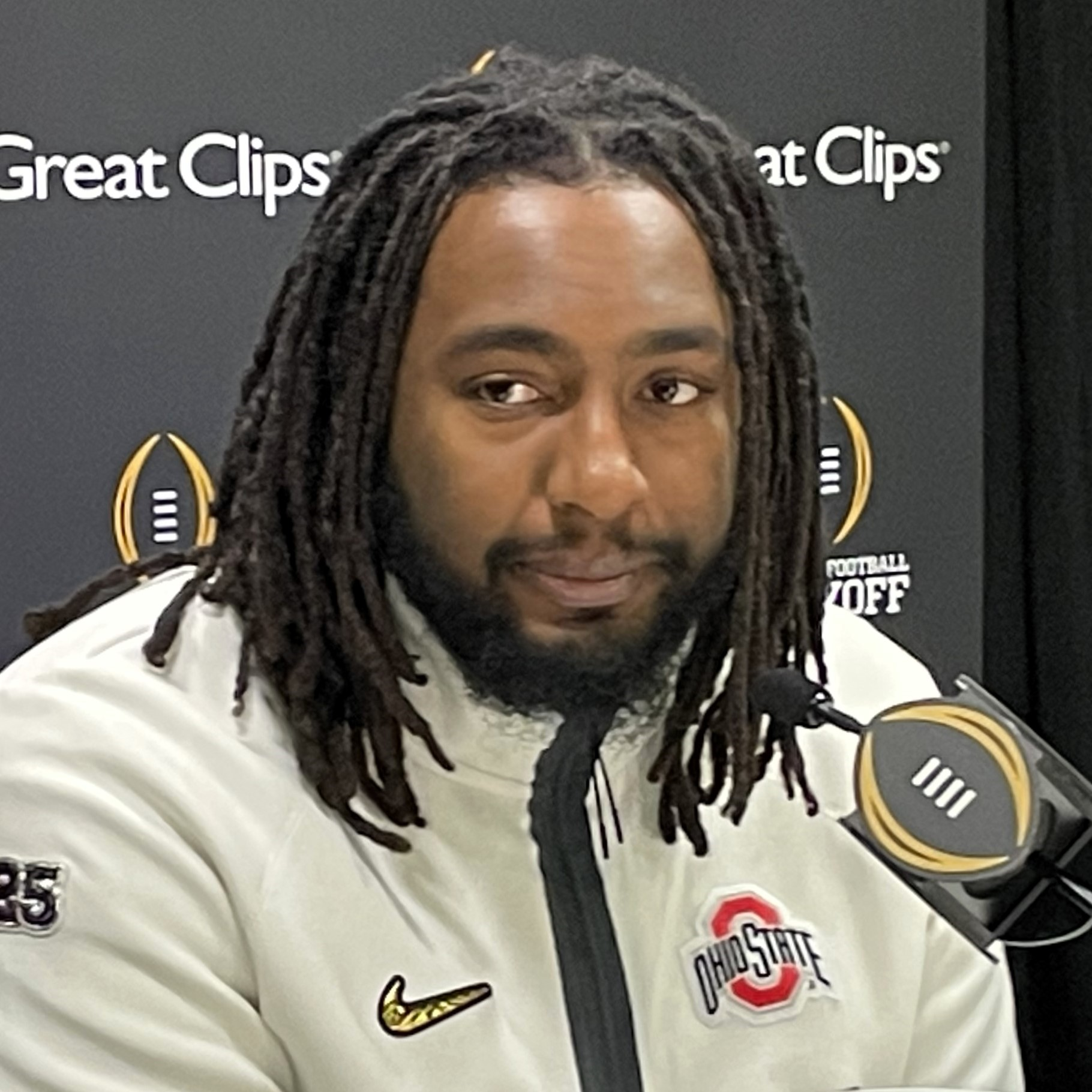
- Jackson with the Ohio State Buckeyes in 2025

No. 74 – Minnesota Vikings
- Position: Guard
- Roster status: Injured reserve

Personal information
- Born: December 4, 2002 (age 23); Houston, Texas, U.S.
- Listed height: 6 ft 4 in (1.93 m)
- Listed weight: 324 lb (147 kg)

Career information
- High school: Episcopal (Bellaire, Texas)
- College: Ohio State (2021–2024)
- NFL draft: 2025: 1st round, 24th overall pick

Career history
- Minnesota Vikings (2025–present)

Awards and highlights
- CFP national champion (2024); First-team All-American (2024); 3× First-team All-Big Ten (2022–2024)

Career NFL statistics as of 2026
- Games played: 18
- Games started: 18
- Stats at Pro Football Reference

Donovan Jackson (born December 4, 2002) is an American professional football guard for the Minnesota Vikings of the National Football League (NFL). He played college football for the Ohio State Buckeyes, winning the 2024 national championship prior to being selected by the Vikings in the first round of the 2025 NFL draft.

== Early life ==
Jackson was born on December 4, 2002, in Houston, Texas and attended Episcopal High School in Bellaire, Texas. He was rated a five-star recruit and committed to play college football at Ohio State over offers from Georgia, Stanford, Texas, and Texas A&M.

== College career ==
Jackson played in all 13 of the Buckeyes' games during his freshman season. He was named a starter at guard going into his sophomore year. Jackson was named first-team All-Big Ten at the end of the season.

== Professional career ==
Pre-draft measurables
Height	Weight	Arm length	Hand span	Wingspan	20-yard shuttle	Vertical jump	Broad jump	Bench press
6 ft 3 5/8 in (1.92 m)	315 lb (143 kg)	33 1/2 in (0.85 m)	9 7/8 in (0.25 m)	6 ft 11 3/4 in (2.13 m)	4.60 s	32.5 in (0.83 m)	8 ft 11 in (2.72 m)	32 reps
All values from NFL Combine/Pro Day

Jackson was selected by the Minnesota Vikings with the 24th overall pick in the first round of the 2025 NFL draft.

On October 6, 2026, Jackson was placed on the Vikings injured reserve list after he suffered a torn meniscus against the Miami Dolphins in Week 4.
