= Kregor Hermet =

Estonian basketball player

No. 13 – JDA Dijon
- Position: Power forward / center
- League: LNB Élite

Personal information
- Born: 9 June 1997 (age 29) Tallinn, Estonia
- Listed height: 2.05 m (6 ft 9 in)
- Listed weight: 98 kg (216 lb)

Career information
- Playing career: 2013–present

Career history
- 2013–2016: Audentes
- 2014–2015: →Kohila
- 2016–2018: Força Lleida
- 2018–2020: Tartu Ülikool
- 2020–2022: BC Kalev
- 2022: Start Lublin
- 2023–2026: BC Kalev
- 2026–present: JDA Dijon

Career highlights
- 3× Estonian League champion (2023, 2024, 2025); Latvian–Estonian League All-Star Five (2024); 3× Estonian Cup winner (2020, 2024, 2025); Latvian–Estonian League champion (2021); Estonian Cup MVP (2020)

Kregor Hermet (born 9 June 1997) is an Estonian professional basketball player for JDA Dijon of the LNB Élite. He is a 2.05 m (6 ft 9 in) tall power forward and center. Hermet also represents the Estonian national basketball team internationally.

== Professional career ==
Hermet began playing basketball with Audentes.

On 1 September 2016, Hermet signed with Força Lleida. On 24 April 2017, he signed a three-year extension. In July 2020 he signed with Kalev/Cramo.

On 13 June 2022 he signed with Start Lublin of the PLK. He left the team at the end of the year because of an injury, having only played in 8 games total.

In January 2023 Hermet went back to Kalev/Cramo and signed a one-and-a-half-year deal. Hermet left Kalev in 2026 after the beginning of the year and joined French team JDA Dijon Basket of the LNB Élite.

== National team career ==
Hermet made his debut for the senior Estonian national team in the 2019 FIBA Basketball World Cup pre-qualifiers.

Hermet was part of the Estonian national team at the EuroBasket 2025, averaging 3.8 points per game.

== Career statistics ==
Legend
GP	Games played	GS	Games started	MPG	Minutes per game
FG%	Field-goal percentage	3P%	3-point field-goal percentage	FT%	Free-throw percentage
RPG	Rebounds per game	APG	Assists per game	SPG	Steals per game
BPG	Blocks per game	PPG	Points per game	PIR	Performance index rating
**Bold**	Career high

=== Domestic leagues ===
Season	Team	League	GP	MPG	FG%	3P%	FT%	RPG	APG	SPG	BPG	PPG
2014–15	(Estonia) Kohila	I Liiga	14	20.9	.526	.200	.724	4.2	.9	.7	.4	10.2
2015–16	(Estonia) Audentes	KML	29	24.7	.500	.100	.732	4.9	.8	.7	.0	11.6
2016–17	(Spain) Força Lleida	LEB Oro	22	8.2	.340	.267	.706	1.2	.1	.3	.0	2.3
2017–18	(Spain) Força Lleida	LEB Oro	32	16.8	.460	.362	.818	3.0	.6	.3	.1	5.1
2018–19	(Estonia) Tartu Ülikool	LEBL	29	27.6	.468	.317	.795	5.6	1.2	.8	.2	16.3
2019–20	(Estonia) Tartu Ülikool	LEBL	20	30.5	.481	.435	.657	5.7	1.4	1.0	.3	17.3
2022–23	(Poland) Start Lublin	PLK	8	18.8	.310	.182	.571	3.4	.5	.4	.4	5.5
2022–23	(Estonia) BC Kalev	LEBL	8	18.4	.453	.333	.5	3.4	1.6	.5	.1	8.4
2023–24	(Estonia) BC Kalev	LEBL	31	22.4	.492	.362	.793	5.3	1.8	.6	.2	10.8
2024–25	(Estonia) BC Kalev	LEBL	30	21.9	.551	.292	.756	5.0	1.6	.8	.3	11.5

=== Estonia national team ===
Year	Tournament	National Team	GP	GS	MPG	FG%	3P%	FT%	RPG	APG	SPG	BPG	PPG
2013	2013 FIBA Europe Under-16 Championship Division B	Estonia U-16	9		19.5	.457	.500	.400	3.4	.7	.9	.0	5.2
2015	2015 FIBA Europe Under-18 Championship Division B	Estonia U-18	9		15.2	.521	.111	.500	4.2	.3	.3	.3	6.0
2016	2016 FIBA Europe Under-20 Championship Division B	Estonia U-20	6		21.1	.424	.417	.842	4.8	.5	1.2	1.3	11.8
2017	2019 Basketball World Cup Pre-Qualifiers	Estonia	3		6.2	.833	.500	-	1.0	.0	.0	.0	3.7
2018–19	2019 Basketball World Cup Qualification	Estonia	6		4.2	.833	1.000	1.000	.2	.2	.3	.0	2.5
2020	EuroBasket 2022 qualification	Estonia	2		12.5	.417	.000	-	1.5	.5	.0	.5	5.0
