= Jaizec Lottie =

American basketball player

No. 4 – Start Lublin
- Position: Point guard
- League: PLK

Personal information
- Born: February 16, 1998 (age 28) Aurora, Colorado, U.S.
- Listed height: 6 ft 2 in (1.88 m)
- Listed weight: 190 lb (86 kg)

Career information
- High school: Cherokee Trail (Aurora, Colorado)
- College: Little Rock (2017-20); Flagler (2020–2022)
- NBA draft: 2022: undrafted
- Playing career: 2022–present

Career history
- 2022–2023: BBC Monthey
- 2023: Givova Scafati
- 2023–2024: VEF Rīga
- 2024–2025: Hamburg Towers
- 2025–2026: CSM Oradea
- 2026–present: Start Lublin

Career highlights
- Latvian Basketball Cup winner (2024); LBL champion (2024)

Jaizec Lottie (born February 16, 1998) is an American professional basketball player for Start Lublin of the Polish Basketball League (PLK). Standing at a height of 6 ft 2 in (1.88 m), he plays the point guard position.

== Professional career ==
After graduating, Lottie signed his first pro contract in Switzerland to become the starting point guard for team BBC Monthey-Chablais. In the summer of 2023, Jaizec played for Portland Trail Blazers in NBA Summer League.

On July 23, 2023, Lottie signed with Givova Scafati in Lega Basket Serie A. After appearing in 4 games, he left Scafati and joined VEF Rīga.

On July 17, 2024, he signed with Hamburg Towers of the Basketball Bundesliga.

On July 27, 2026, he signed with Start Lublin of the Polish Basketball League (PLK).
