= Buriadia =

Buriadia Temporal range: Carboniferous to Permian 359.2–251 Ma

Scientific classification
- Kingdom: Plantae
- Clade: Tracheophytes
- Clade: Gymnospermae
- Division: Pinophyta
- Class: Pinopsida
- Order: †Voltziales
- Family: †Buriadiaceae
- Genus: †Buriadia; A.C.Seward & B.Sahni

Species
- Buriadia florinii Maithy, 1970; Buriadia fragilis Maithy, 1969; Buriadia heterophylla (Brongniart, 1828); Buriadia sewardii Sahni, 1928

Genus of conifers

Buriadia is a genus that existed from the Carboniferous to the Permian. Buriadia were vascular plants that reproduced by seed. The type species is Buriadia heterophylla.

== Location ==
In Paleorrota geopark, located in Brazil, were found rare branches of the genus Buriadia, are in the Rio Bonito Formation and date from Sakmarian in the Permian.
