= Rapla =

Town in Estonia

- Town
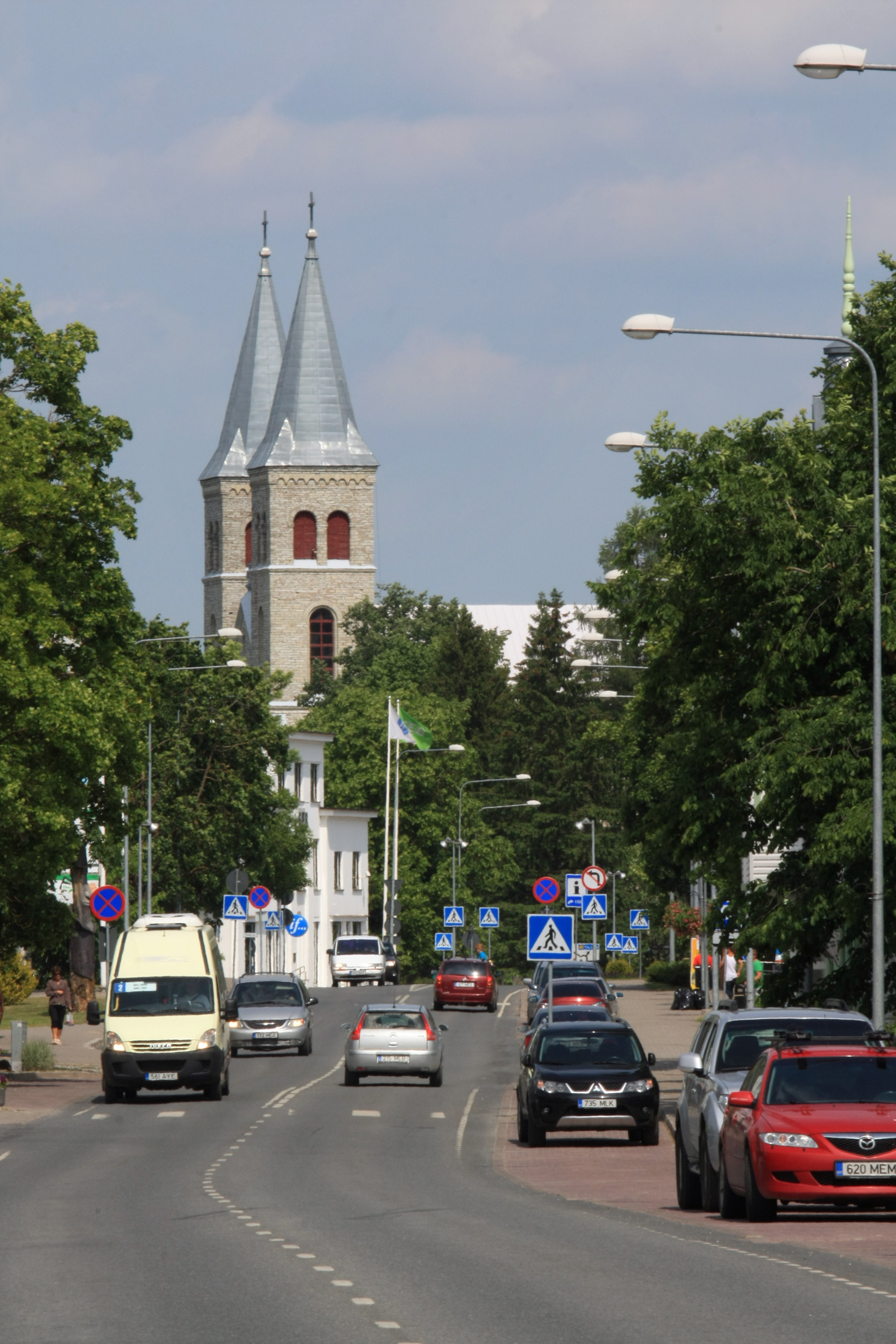
- Centre of Rapla, the church in the background.

- Location in Estonia
- Coordinates: 58°59′40″N 24°48′04″E
- Country: Estonia
- County: Rapla County
- Municipality: Rapla Parish
- Elevation: 67 m (220 ft)

Population (2026)
  - Total: 5,209
  - Rank: 21st
- Time zone: UTC+2 (EET)
  - Summer (DST): UTC+3 (EEST)
- Postal code: 79511

Drone video of Rapla and its octagonal KEK house in Estonia 2021

Rapla (German: Rappel (the name Rappel was also used in other languages in the past) is a town in north-central Estonia, the capital of Rapla County and the centre of Rapla Parish.

Rapla's population was 5,209 in 2026.

== History ==
The oldest records date back to 1241 in the Danish Census Book, when it was said that it was a small village with 8 acres of cultivated fields. By the end of the 13th century, the village centre was firmly established. At around the same time, a Cistercian monastery was built.

Rapla's ambitious period of fast growth began only in the late 19th century. In 1866, a pharmacy was built, in 1868 a school, and in 1888 a hospital. In 1898, a brick factory was opened, and in 1900, a railway line was built between Rapla and Viljandi. The old stone church was demolished in the late 19th century and a new one was built in a Romanesque style, one of the purest examples of this style in all of Estonia.

In 1913, Rapla consisted of around 20 stone and 60 wooden houses. During this time period, a number of social societies were established, such as the Volunteer Fire Company, the Song and Music Society, the Society of Agriculture, a Mutual Fire Insurance Company, a Consumer Association, and the Deposit Insurance Fund.

It has a railway station on the Tallinn–Viljandi railway line operated by Elron. In 1931, a narrow gauge railway from Rapla to Virtsu opened and remained in use until 1968.

Rapla received town rights in 1993.

== Demographics ==
Ethnicity	1934 (Note: Data for 'Rapla borough' and 'Rapla railway station' has been summed for convenience)		1959		1970		1979		1989		2000		2011		2021	
Ethnicity	amount	%	amount	%	amount	%	amount	%	amount	%	amount	%	amount	%	amount	%
Estonians	975	98.1	2462	80.1	3998	91.0	5070	90.6	5647	90.0	5387	93.6	4981	95.8	5022	95.6
Russians	8	0.80	-	-	210	4.78	345	6.16	391	6.24	233	4.05	139	2.67	106	2.02
Ukrainians	-	-	-	-	21	0.48	32	0.57	40	0.64	33	0.57	17	0.33	19	0.36
Belarusians	-	-	-	-	26	0.59	22	0.39	21	0.33	11	0.19	4	0.08	3	0.06
Finns	-	-	-	-	75	1.71	72	1.29	89	1.42	39	0.68	25	0.48	25	0.48
Jews	-	-	-	-	0	0.00	3	0.05	2	0.03	2	0.03	1	0.02	3	0.06
Latvians	3	0.30	-	-	2	0.05	4	0.07	1	0.02	2	0.03	2	0.04	8	0.15
Germans	5	0.50	-	-	-	-	32	0.57	41	0.65	9	0.16	8	0.15	8	0.15
Tatars	-	-	-	-	-	-	1	0.02	0	0.00	0	0.00	0	0.00	0	0.00
Poles	-	-	-	-	-	-	3	0.05	1	0.02	2	0.03	0	0.00	3	0.06
Lithuanians	-	-	-	-	16	0.36	6	0.11	6	0.10	6	0.10	1	0.02	0	0.00
unknown	0	0.00	0	0.00	0	0.00	0	0.00	0	0.00	10	0.17	2	0.04	19	0.36
other	3	0.30	611	19.9	43	0.98	9	0.16	32	0.51	24	0.42	22	0.42	37	0.70
Total	994	100	3073	100	4391	100	5599	100	6271	100	5758	100	5202	100	5254	99.9

== Gallery ==
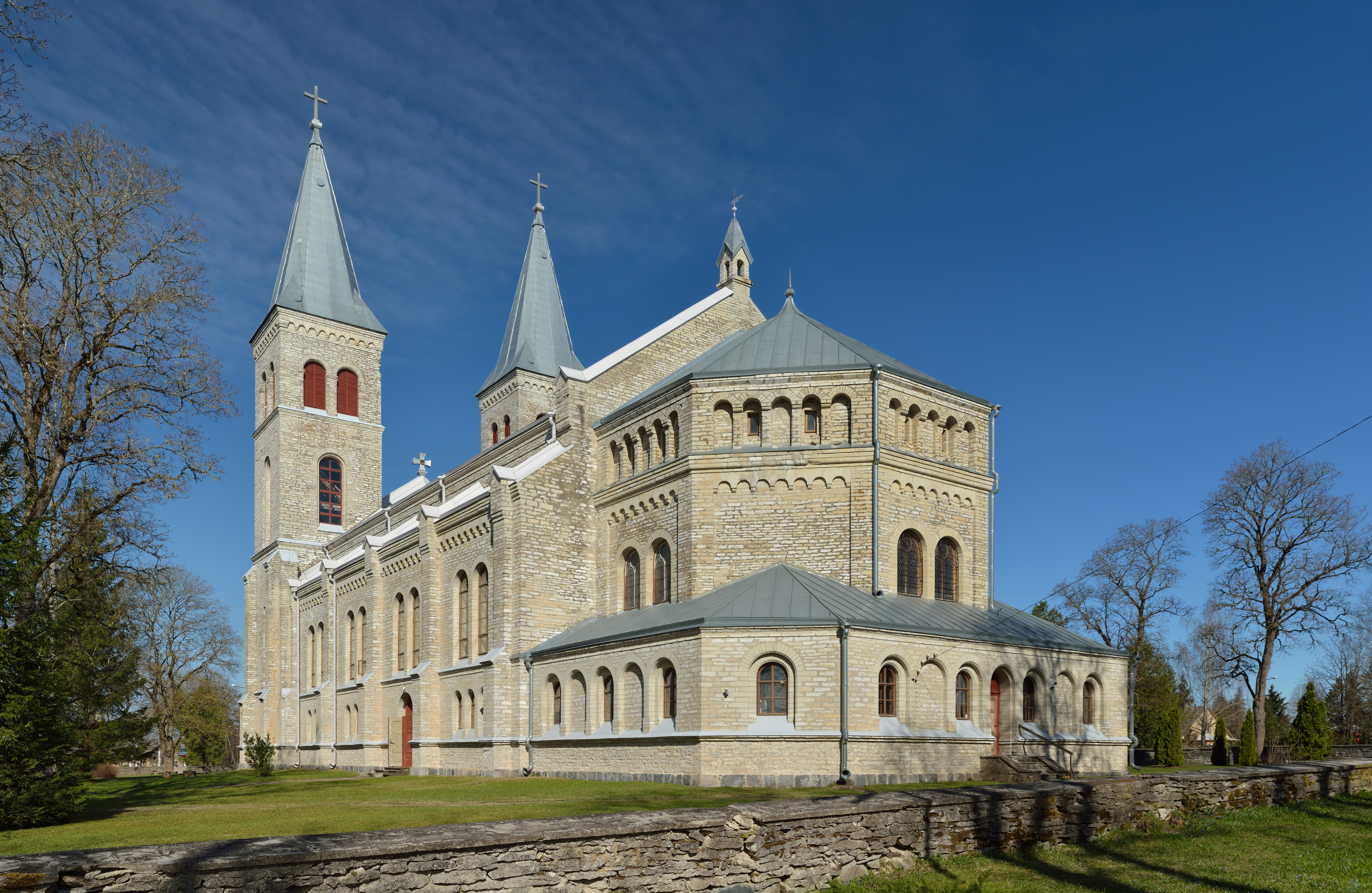
Rapla Maria Magdalena Lutheran Church

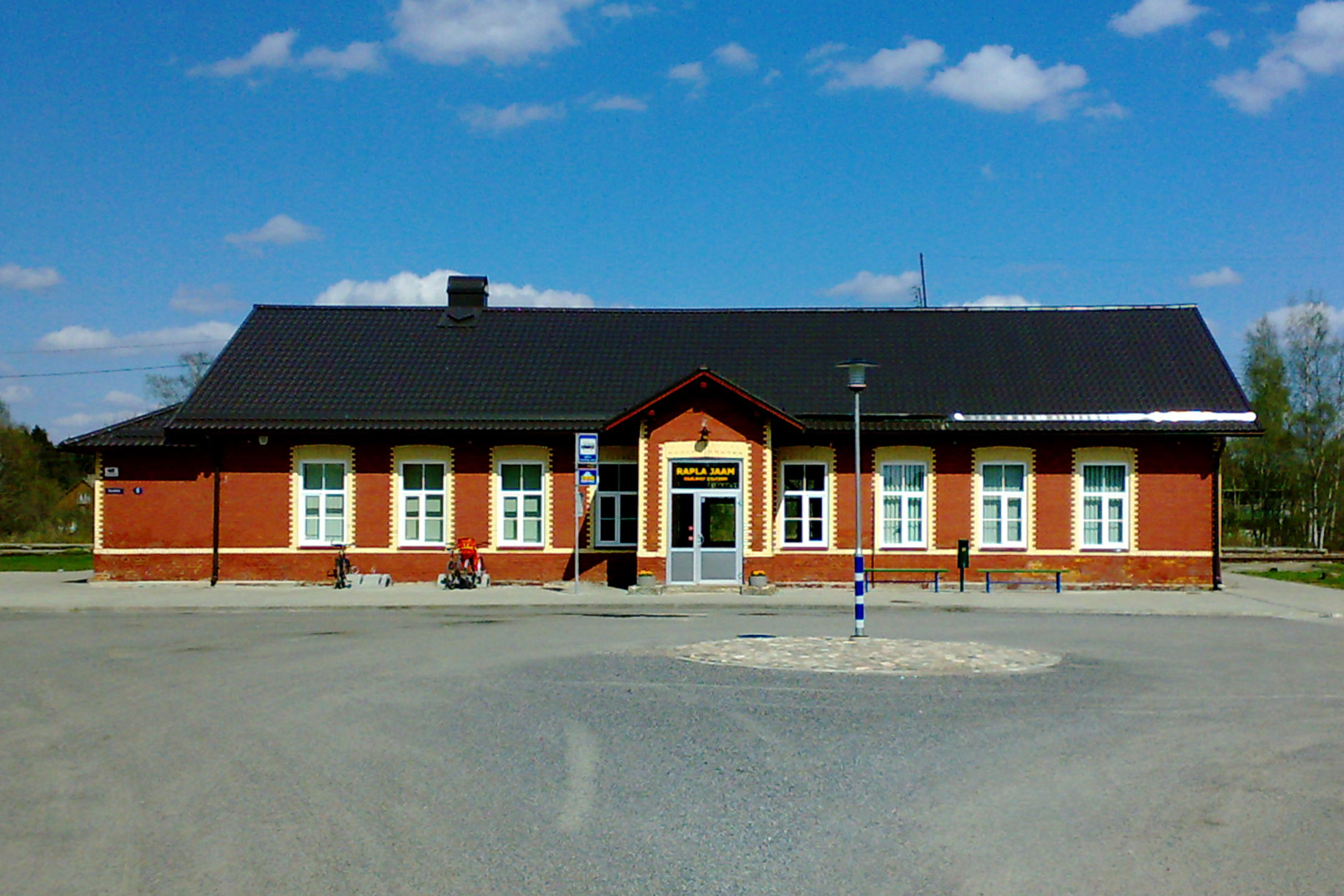
Rapla railway station

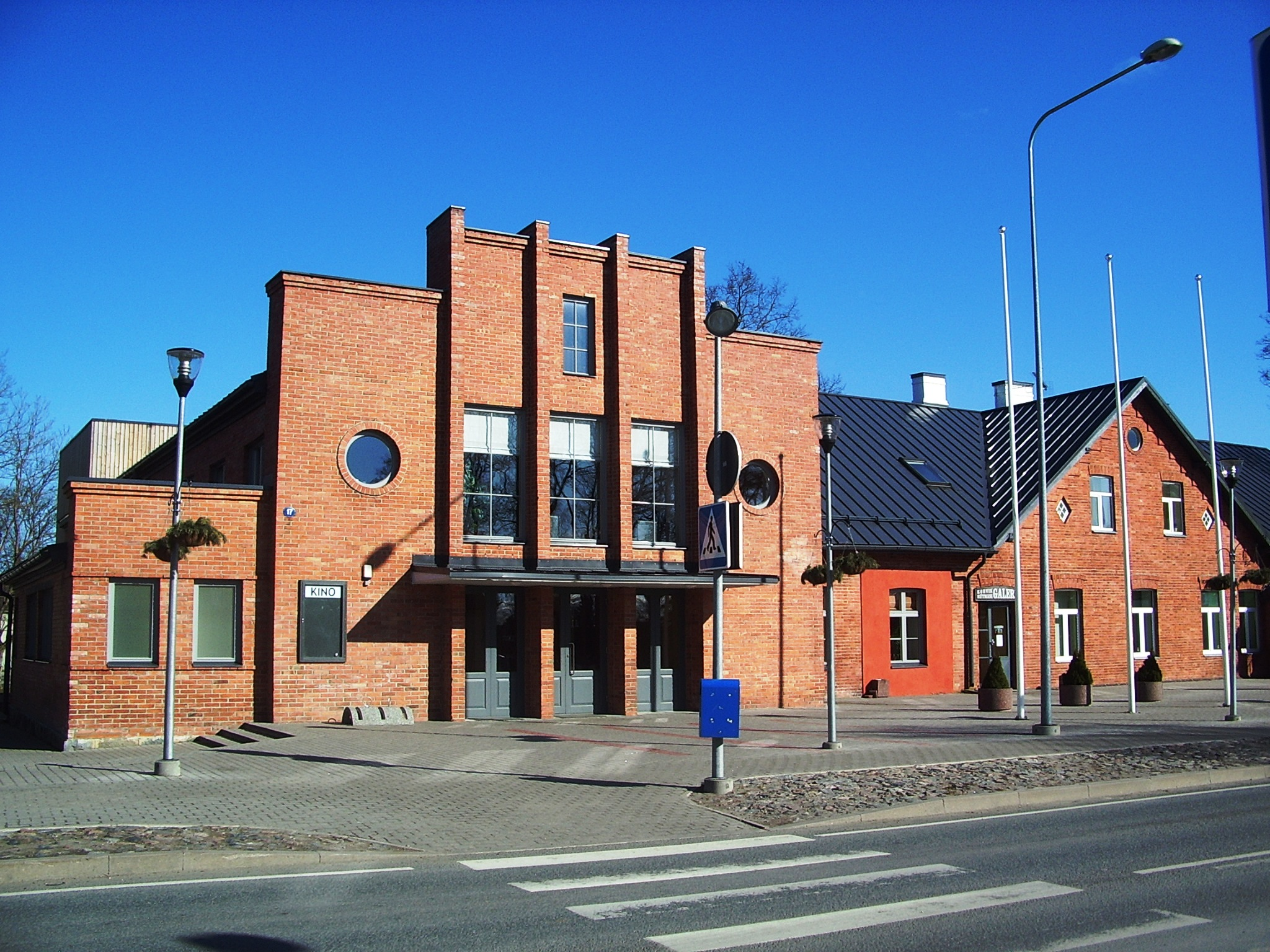
Rapla cultural centre

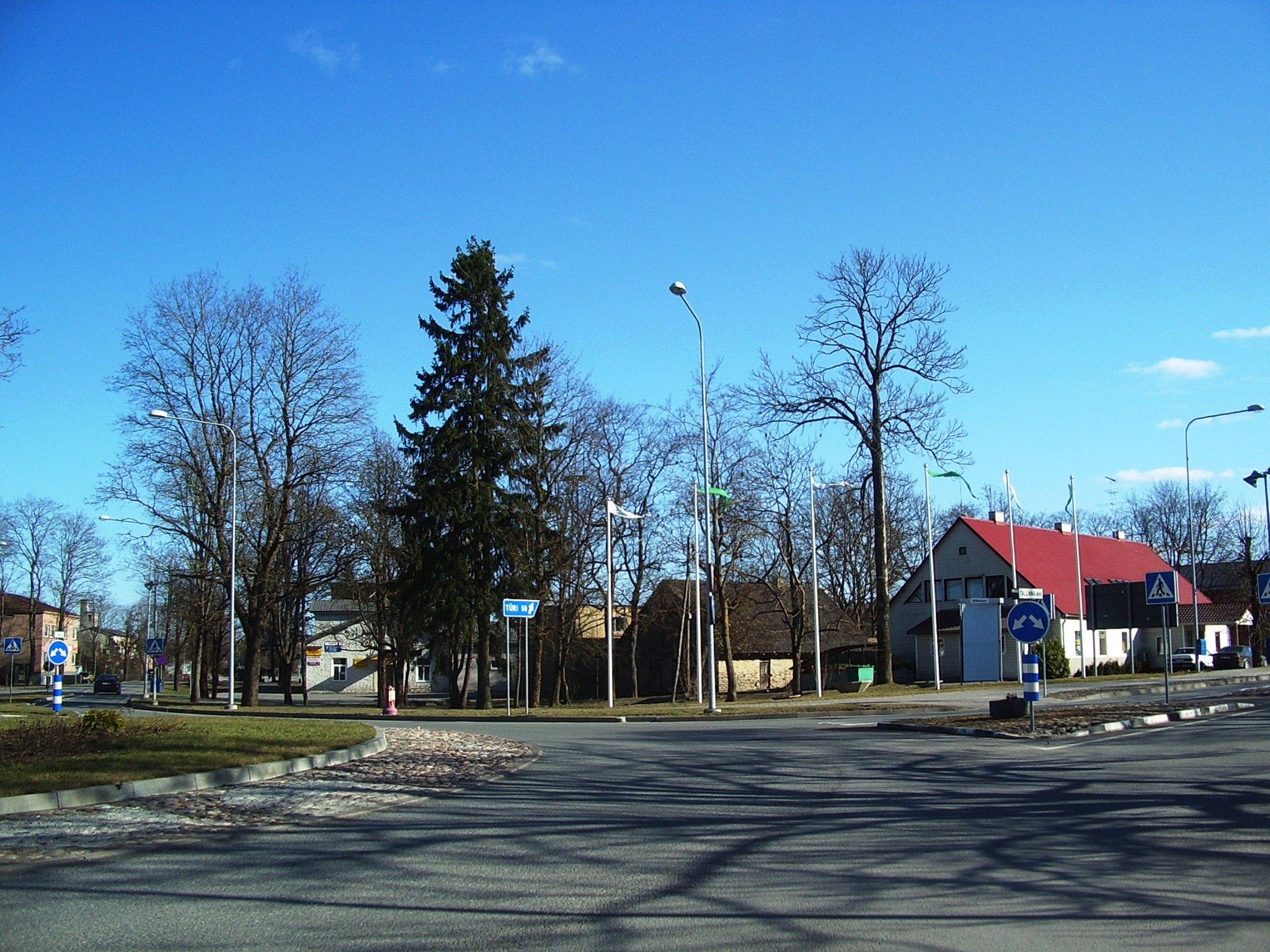
Central square of Rapla

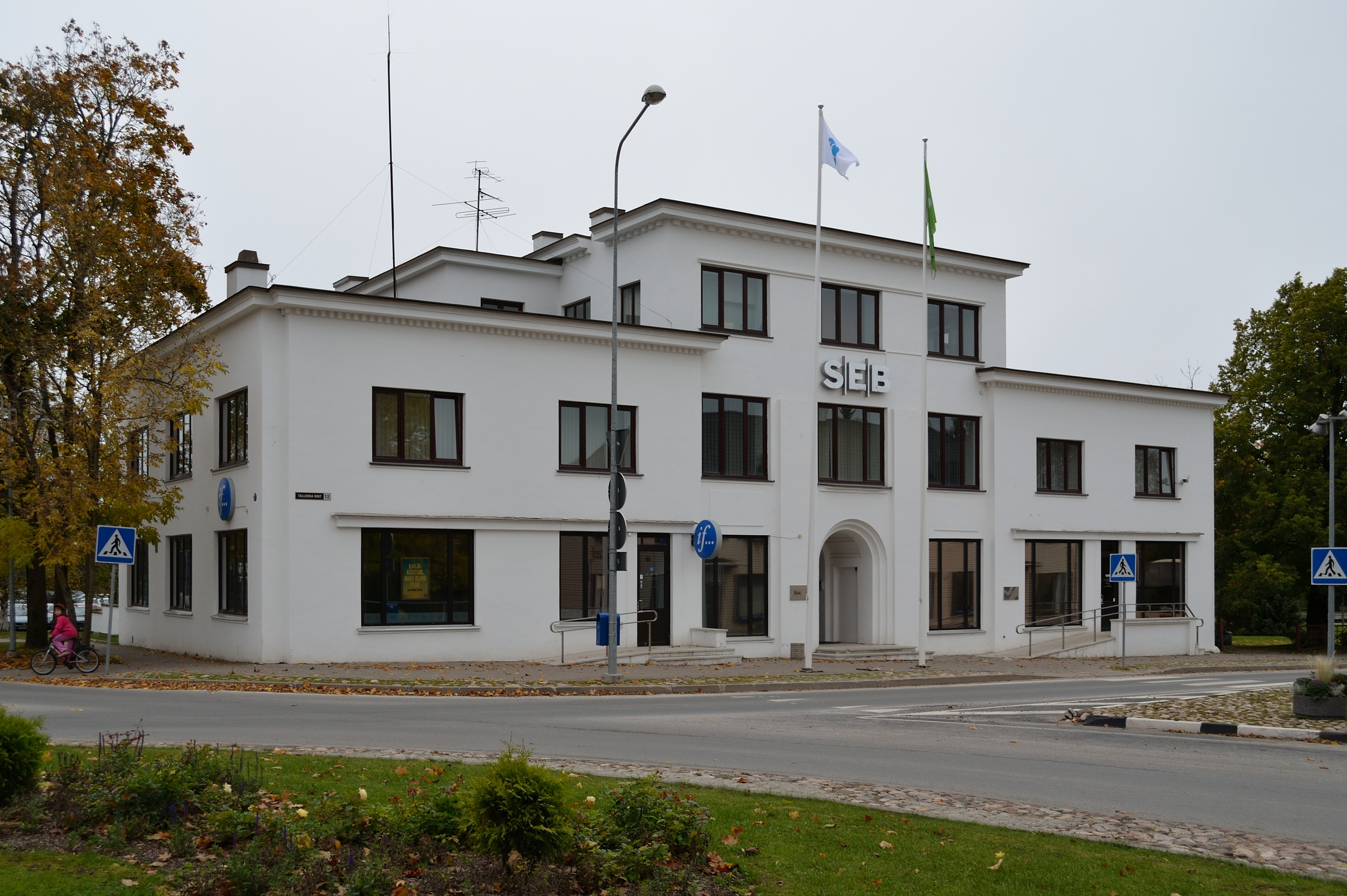
Bank in Rapla

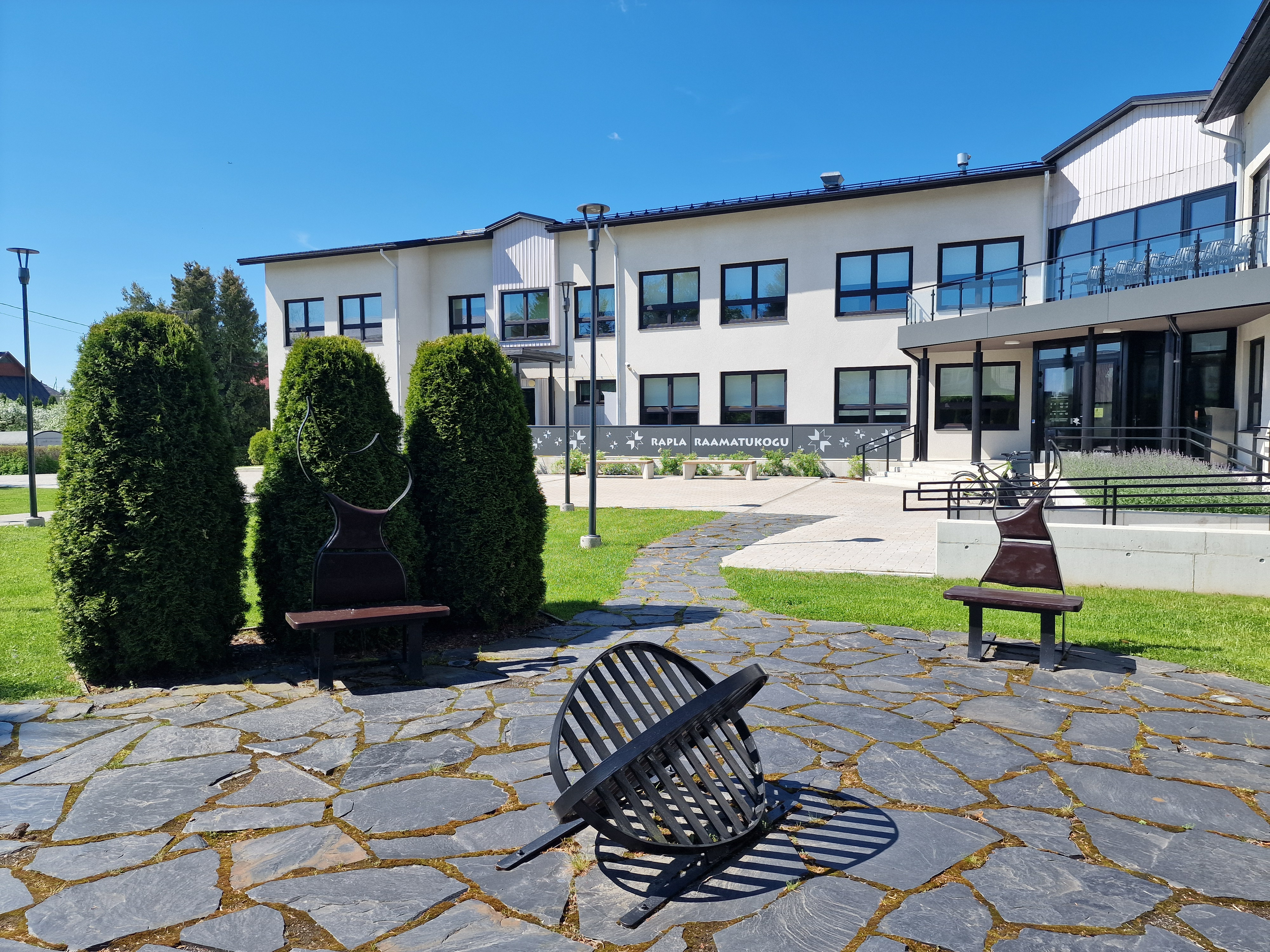
Public library

== Notable people ==
- Einar Soone (born 1947), prelate, suffragan bishop to the Archbishop of Tallinn
- Helle Meri (1949–2024), actress and the First Lady of Estonia, 1992 to 2001, as the wife of Lennart Meri
- Urve Tiidus (born 1954), politician, Mayor of Kuressaare & Minister of Culture, 2013 to 2015
- Eve Pormeister (born 1956) a Germanist, literary scholar, critic and cultural mediator.
- Anne Veski (born 1956), pop singer.
- Lea Dali Lion (1974–2021), singer, musician and songwriter; soloist in the band Blacky, 1998 to 2013.
- Piret Laurimaa (born 1971), actress.
- Kristiina Ehin (born 1977), poet, translator, singer and songwriter.
- Rene Kokk (born 1980), politician, Minister of the Environment, 2019 to 2020.
- Märt Avandi (born 1981), actor and comedian, worked in the Estonian Drama Theatre, 2009 to 2014.
- Mikk Jürjens (born 1987), actor; singer and TV presenter.

== See also ==
- Cheleutochroa (Acritarch from the Rapla borehole)
