= Quadrisporites =

Quadrisporites Temporal range: Permian

Scientific classification
- Domain: Eukaryota
- (unranked): †Acritarcha
- Genus: †Quadrisporites; J.P.F. Hennelly, 1959

Species
- Quadrisporites acanthifer Cramer & Díez, 1976; Quadrisporites horridus (Hennelly); Quadrisporites lobatus (Tiwari & Navale); Quadrisporites variabilis (Cramer, 1966) Jardine et al., 1971

Genus of algae (fossil)

Quadrisporites is an extinct genus of acritarchs. The species Q. horridus was located in outcrop Morro do Papaléo in the town of Mariana Pimentel in Brazil, the geopark Paleorrota. The outcrop is in the Rio Bonito Formation and date of Sakmarian in the Permian.
