= Portalites =

Portalites Temporal range: Permian

Scientific classification
- Domain: Eukaryota
- (unranked): †Acritarcha
- Genus: †Portalites; Hemer & P.W. Nygreen, 1967

Species
- Portalites. baculus (1988); Portalites confertus (1967) type species; Portalites gondwanensis (1968)

Extinct genus of microfossil organisms

Portalites is an extinct genus of acritarchs. The species Portalites gondwanensis was located in outcrop Morro do Papaléo in the town of Mariana Pimentel in Brazil, the geopark Paleorrota. The outcrop is in the Rio Bonito Formation and date from Sakmarian in the Permian.
