= Tetraporina =

Tetraporina Temporal range: Permian

Scientific classification
- Domain: Eukaryota
- (unranked): †Acritarcha
- Genus: †Tetraporina; S.N. Naumova, 1939

Genus of microorganisms

Tetraporina is an extinct genus of algae. The genus of undefined species were found in outcrop Morro do Papaléo in the town of Mariana Pimentel in Brazil, the geopark Paleorrota, on Rio Bonito Formation. The outcrop date Sakmarian in Permian.
