= Buriadiaceae =

Buriadiaceae Temporal range: Carboniferous to Permian 359.2–251 Ma

Scientific classification
- Kingdom: Plantae
- Clade: Tracheophytes
- Clade: Gymnospermae
- Division: Pinophyta
- Class: Pinopsida
- Order: †Voltziales
- Family: †Buriadiaceae; S.Archang.

Genera
- Buriadia; Coricladus

Family of conifers

Buriadiaceae is a family of conifers that existed in the Carboniferous to Permian geologic periods.
