= Large ornamented Ediacaran microfossil =

Microscopic acritarchs, usually over 100 μm in diameter, common in Esiacaran sediments

Large ornamented Ediacaran microfossils are microscopic acritarchs, usually over 100 μm in diameter, which are common in sediments of the Ediacaran period, 635 to 538.8 million years ago. They largely disappear from the Ediacaran period fossil record before 560 million years ago, roughly coeval with the origin of the Ediacara biota. They differ from Palaeozoic microfossils in many respects; they are larger, often have internal contents, have a differently-constructed cell wall, and differ in shape.

== Affinity ==
The affinity of large ornamented Ediacaran microfossils is a matter of current research.

Like the resting cysts of some animals, these microfossils have three layers in their cell walls. If large ornamented Ediacaran microfossils represent animal resting stages, this would be consistent with frequent periods of oceanic anoxia in the Ediacaran period, which disappear in the Cambrian period.

They are much larger than any known dinoflagellate, and dinoflagellate biomarkers are absent in the Ediacaran period.

Green alga-related spores and cysts are generally differently or un-ornamented, and an order of magnitude smaller in diameter.

== Role of spines ==
In the Ediacaran period, predatory (cell-ingesting) organisms were just evolving. It has been suggested that the spines evolved as a defence to predation, although this argument loses weight if predation began earlier. Further, many predators are unaffected by spines, with the cyst alone providing sufficient protection from digestion.
