= Coricladus =

Coricladus Temporal range: Permian

Scientific classification
- Kingdom: Plantae
- Division: Pinophyta
- Class: Pinopsida
- Order: †Voltziales
- Genus: †Coricladus JasperI, BrancoI, Guerra-Sommer (2005)

Species
- †C. quiteriensis

Genus of conifers

The extinct genus Coricladus of conifers was originally defined by André Jasper, Fresia Ricardi-Branco, and Margot Guerra-Sommer in 2005. The species Coricladus quiteriensis is the type species. The species is named in honor of the place where it was found, the Quitéria outcrop in the city of Pantano Grande in the geopark Paleorrota in Brazil. The outcrop is in the Rio Bonito Formation and dates from the Sakmarian in the Permian.

== Definition ==
Like any plant conifer, Coricladus was a vascular plant, which reproduced via seeds. The classification of its order and family is still very uncertain.
