= Coryphidium =

Coryphidium Temporal range: Early Ordovician (Arenig)

Scientific classification
- (unranked): †Acritarcha
- Genus: †Coryphidium; M.Vavrdová, 1972

Species
- †Coryphidium bohemicum Vavrdová, 1972; †Coryphidium elegans F.H.Cramer, Allam, Kanes, & Diez, 1974; †Coryphidium sichuanense F.Wang & Q.Chen C

Genus of Acritarcha

Coryphidium is an extinct genus of acritarchs.

C. elegans is from the Tremadocian, the lower age of the Ordovocian of Morocco.
