= Korilophyton =

Korilophyton Temporal range: Cambrian

Scientific classification
- Domain: Eukaryota
- (unranked): †Acritarcha
- Genus: †Korilophyton; Voronova in Voronova & Radionova, 1976

Type species
- Epiphyton inopinatum Voronova, 1969

Species
- †Korilophyton angustum Voronova in Voronova & Radionova, 1976; †Korilophyton inopinatum (Voronova) Voronova in Voronova & Radionova, 1976

Genus of branching Cambrian acritarchs of presumed algal affinity

Korilophyton is a genus of branching Cambrian acritarchs of presumed algal affinity.
