= Lea Dali Lion =

Estonian singer and musician (1974–2021)

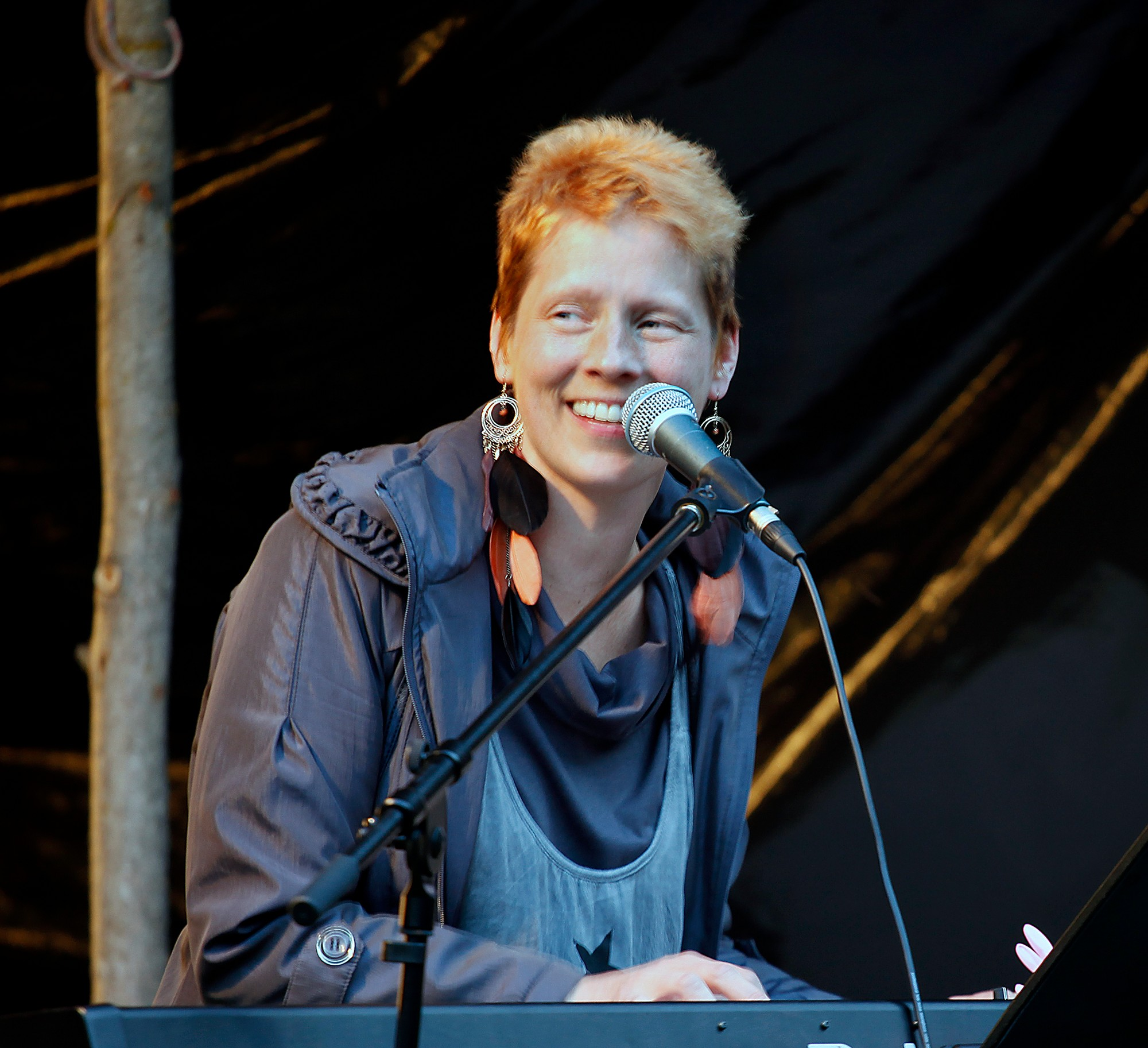
- Lea Dali Lion in 2014

Background information
- Also known as: Lea Liitmaa
- Born: Lea Teemets; 28 February 1974; Rapla, then part of Estonian SSR, Soviet Union
- Died: 21 April 2021 (aged 47) Tallinn, Estonia
- Occupation: Vocalist
- Instrument: Vocals

Lea Dali Lion (born Lea Teemets, formerly Lea Liitmaa until 2014; 28 February 1974 – 21 April 2021) was an Estonian singer, musician and songwriter.

== Career ==
Lion was the soloist of the Estonian band Blacky, founded in 1998, until the breakup of the band in 2013. In 2002, Lea Liitmaa and Jaagup Kreem took 9th place in the Estonian Eurovision premiere show "Eurolaul" with the song "What if I Fell". In 2007, she was on the front page of Playboy Estonia magazine. In the same year, she released her solo album "Love". In 2014, she performed in the second season of the TV show Laula mu laulu; in the seventh part, her songs were performed by Tõnis Mägi, Eda-Ines Etti, Birgit Õigemeel, Jaagup Kreem, Jarek Kasar and Ott Lepland. In 2015, she published a book, Draw Light. It's the Beginning of Everything New, describing her fight against breast cancer. In connection with this, she also changed her name to Lea Dali Lion in 2014.

== Personal life and death ==
From 2000 to 2006, she was married to guitarist Elmar Liitmaa. Lion had three children.

Lion was diagnosed with breast cancer in 2014. She died on 21 April 2021, in Tallinn after contracting COVID-19.
