= Philippe Louis Voltz =

French mining engineer, metallurgist, geologist and fossil collector (1785–1840)

Philippe-Louis Voltz (15 August 1785 – 6 February 1840) was a French mining engineer, metallurgist, and geologist. He examined fossils in relation to stratigraphy and, with his knowledge of languages, took part in the interchange of ideas between French and German geologists.

Voltz was born in Strasbourg where his father David ran a cafe. He went to the École polytechnique in 1803 and the École des Mines in 1805 before joining the mine establishments in Belgium and in the Alsace region. He studied steel making in England and Germany and worked on blast furnaces in France. From 1830 he gave lectures in geology at Strasbourg where he influenced many future geologists including Jules Thurmann and Amanz Gressly. Along with Armand Dufrénoy (1792-1857), he was also involved in arranging the geological collections with a stratigraphic focus at the Strasbourg Academy and brought together numerous fossil plants, some described by his student Wilhelm Philippe Schimper. He became an inspector of mines in 1836.

He was awarded the Legion of Honour in 1831. Fluent in German, Voltz corresponded with German geologists and was made a member of the Leopoldina Academy in 1833. He organized a special meeting of the French Geological Society in Strasbourg in 1834 with attendance from both French and foreign geologists. He was a founding member of the Société d’Historie Naturelle de Strasbourg. The Triassic conifer genus Voltzia was named in his honour in 1828 by Adolphe Brongniart. The mineral voltzite was named after him by Joseph Jean Baptiste Xavier Fournet in 1833.
