= Cephalonyx =

- Line drawing reconstruction of the species Cephalonyx sibiriens

Scientific classification
- Domain: Eukaryota
- (unranked): †Acritarcha
- Genus: †Cephalonyx; Weiss, 1984

Extinct genus of eukaryotes

Cephalonyx is a genus of filamentous acritarchs known from the Precambrian and early Cambrian (and possibly other times).
