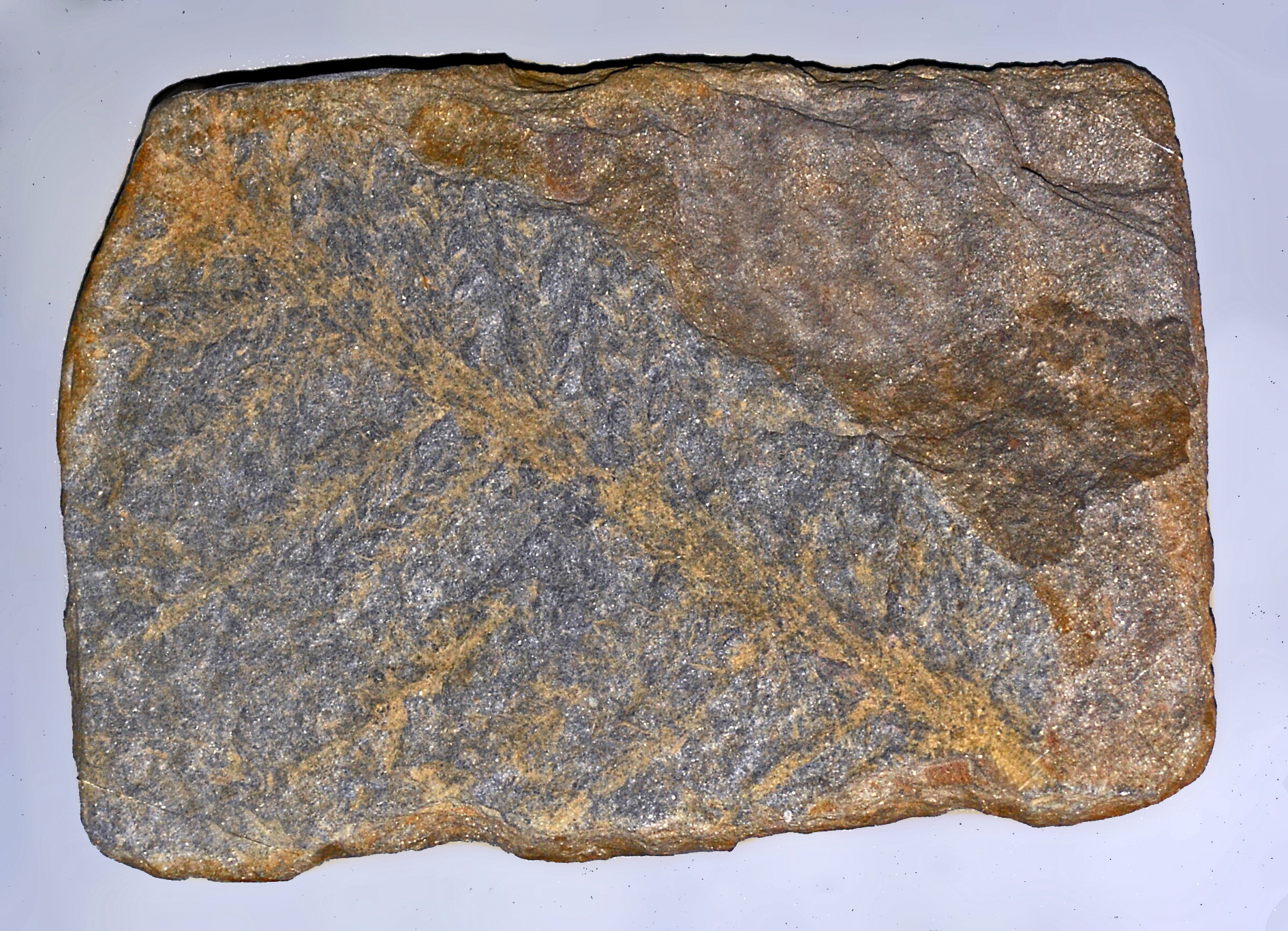
- Fossil of Utrechtia piniformis

Scientific classification
- Kingdom: Plantae
- Clade: Tracheophytes
- Clade: Gymnospermae
- Division: Pinophyta
- Class: Pinopsida
- Order: †Voltziales
- Family: †Utrechtiaceae; Mapes & G. W. Rothwell

= Utrechtiaceae =

Extinct family of conifers

Utrechtiaceae is an extinct family of trees related to modern conifers. This family dates back to the late Carboniferous and Early Permian.

== Description ==
They were forest trees with almost horizontal standing leafy lateral shoots and with vertical tribes. They were generally small trees. At least with Utrechtia piniformis the side shoots are in whorls.

Like other Voltzialean plants, they had compact ovulate cones bearing bilateral bract-scale complexes. The leaves are scale-like, arranged spirally and only a few millimeters long.

== Genera ==
Utrechtiaceae includes the following selected genera:

- Carpentiera Nemejc & Augusta, 1934
- Czatkalostrobus L.I.Savizkaja, 1975
- Dvinostrobus A.V.Gomankov & S.V.Meyen, 1986
- Ernestiodendron Florin, 1934
- Lebachia R.Florin, 1938
- Macdonaldodendron H.J.Falcon-Lang, F.Kurzawe & S.G.Lucas, 2014
- Moyliostrobus C.N.Miller & J.T.Brown, 1973
- Ortiseia R.Florin, 1964
- Utrechtia G.W.Rothwell & G.Mapes, 2003
- Walchia Sternberg, 1825
- Walchianthus Florin, 1940
- Walchiostrobus Florin, 1940

== See also ==
- Data related to Voltziales at Wikispecies
