= Granomarginata =

Granomarginata Temporal range: Cambrian

Scientific classification
- Domain: Eukaryota
- (unranked): †Acritarcha
- Genus: †Granomarginata; S.N.Naumova, 1960

Extinct genus of organisms

Granomarginata is a genus of spherical Cambrian acritarchs interpreted as a phytoplankton.
