= Kawizophyllum =

Kawizophyllum Temporal range: Permian

Scientific classification
- Kingdom: Plantae
- Genus: Kawizophyllum

Species
- K. dunpathriensis †, Kapoor 1979

Extinct genus of plants

Kawizophyllum is an extinct genus of plants that lived in the Permian.

== Location ==
In Brazil, the fossil of species indefinite of the genus Kawizophyllum, was located on outcrop Morro Papaléo in the city of Mariana Pimentel. They are in the geopark Paleorrota in Rio Bonito Formation and date from Sakmarian at Permian.

The species K. dunpathriensis was also located in India.
