= Shuiyousphaeridium =

Shuiyousphaeridium Temporal range: 1800-540 Ma

Scientific classification
- Domain: Eukaryota
- (unranked): †Acritarcha
- Genus: †Shuiyousphaeridium; Yan, 1993

Species
- Shuiyousphaeridium macroreticulatum; Shuiyousphaeridium membraniferum

Shuiyousphaeridium is an extinct genus of acritarch discovered in 1993. Dated to 1.8Ga, it represents one of the earliest fossil eukaryote taxa. It is found in the Changcheng System and the Ruyang Group of China.
