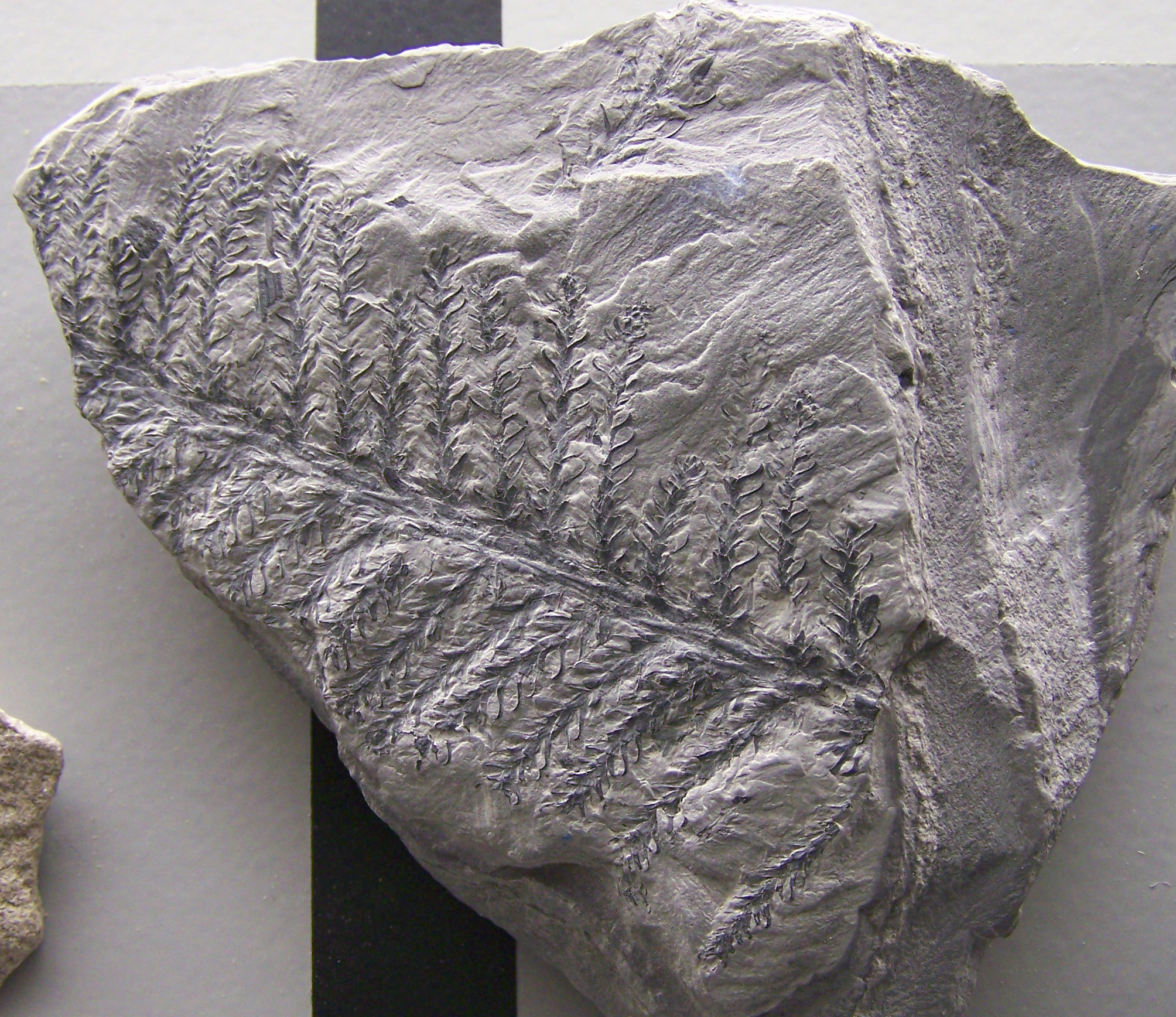
- Walchia piniformis

Scientific classification
- Kingdom: Plantae
- Clade: Tracheophytes
- Clade: Gymnosperms
- Division: Pinophyta
- Class: Pinopsida
- Order: †Voltziales
- Family: †Utrechtiaceae
- Genus: †Walchia; Sternberg

Species
- Walchia garnettensis; Walchia hypnoides; Walchia piniformis

= Walchia =

Walchia Temporal range: ~310–290 Ma

Extinct genus of conifers

Walchia is a primitive fossil conifer found in upper Pennsylvanian (Carboniferous) and lower Permian (about 310-290 Mya) rocks of Europe and North America. A forest of in-situ Walchia tree-stumps is located on the Northumberland Strait coast at Brule, Nova Scotia.

Besides the Walchia forest, fallen tree trunks, and leaflet impressions, the forest, fossil-rich layer contains numerous, 4-legged, tetrapod fossil trackways.

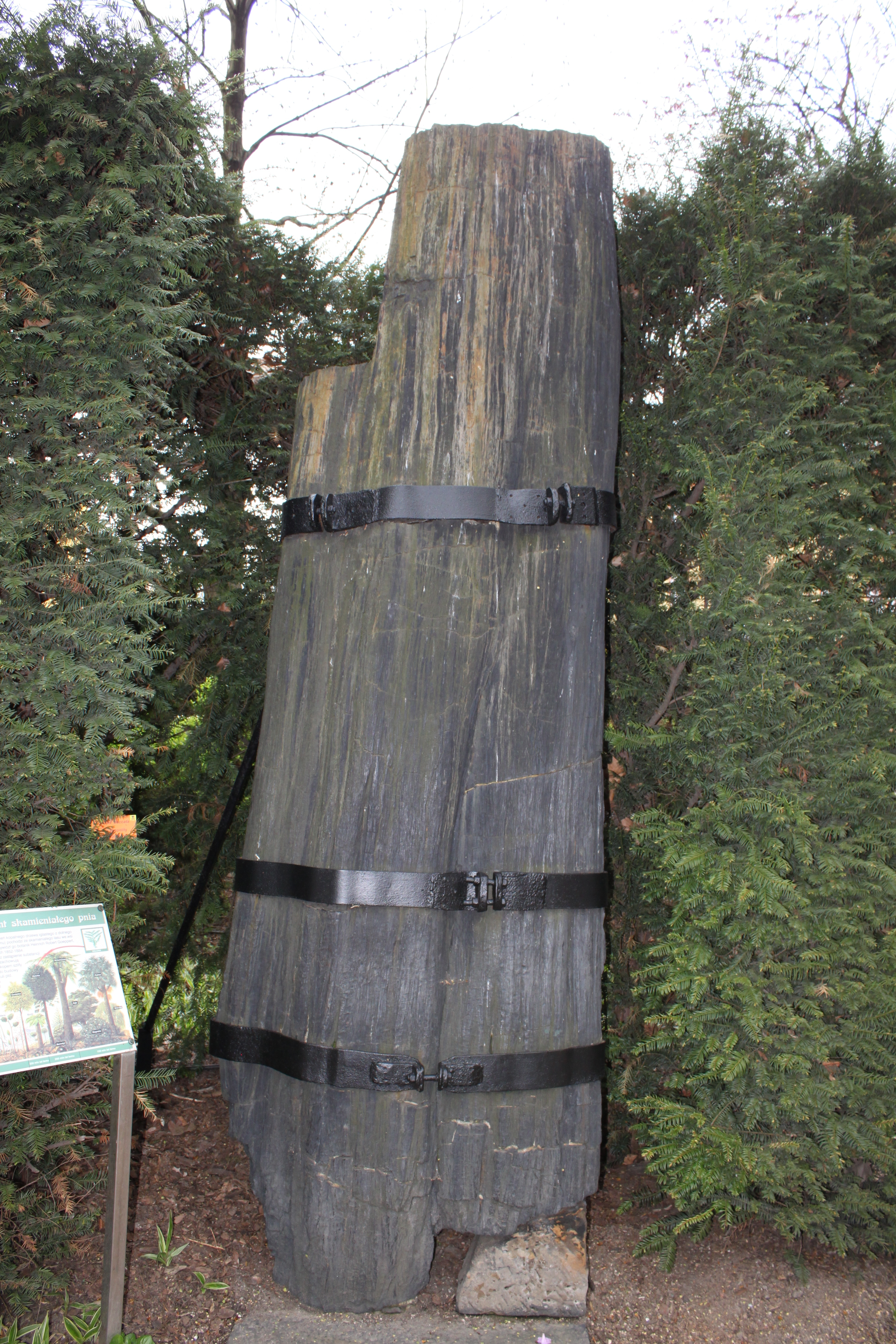
Walchia trunk

== Individual species ==
Walchia hypnoides: from the schists of Lodeve; also copper slates of the Zechstein in Mansfeld.

== Monuran trackways ==
At the same time period of 290 mya, another species was making fossil trackways, now preserved in New Mexico; Walchia leaflets are found in the same fossil layers. The Monuran trackways were made by Permian, wingless insects called monurans, (meaning "one-tail"); the insects' means of locomotion was hopping, then walking.

These 290 mya layers contain footprints of the large Dimetrodon, large/small raindrop impact marks, and also these fossil trackways of insects.
