= Ceratophyton =

Ceratophyton Temporal range: Cambrian

Scientific classification
- Domain: Eukaryota
- Kingdom: Animalia
- Phylum: incertae sedis
- Genus: †Ceratophyton; Kiryanov, 1979

Species
- C. circufuntum Zang in Gravestock et al. 2001; C. duplicum Paskevicienè 1980; C. dumufuntum Zang in Gravestock et al. 2001; C. spinuconum Zang in Gravestock et al. 2001; C. vernicosum Kiryanov 1979 (type); = C. groetlingboensis Hagenfeldt, 1989; = Veryhachium trisentium Zang 2001

Extinct genus of Cambrian organisms

Ceratophyton is a genus of Cambrian acritarch, around 100–200 μm in length, produced by a eukaryotic (metazoan?) organism.

== Affinity ==
Ceratophyton has been interpreted as an originally chitinous component of a metazoan. An arthropod relationship has been proposed, although on a more conservative view it is difficult to provide confident classification beyond saying that they are fragments of a eukaryote. Particular species, however, show promising similarity to the sclerites of modern priapulid worms.

== Species ==
=== C. vernicosum ===
This species, the type, comprises a single unornamented cone. This species occurs in platform settings in western Russia in the Lontova and Lyukati horizons, first occurring in the local base of the 'Cambrian'. In Poland it occurs from the base of the Cambrian (Platysolenites zone) to the Schmidtiellus zone.

It has been reported from the middle Cambrian of Belgium, although these specimens are short on diagnostic features.

It also occurs below the T. pedum zone, indicating the presence of the producer in the Ediacaran period.

=== C. circufuntum ===
This species is represented by single cones that have rings around their bases.

=== C. duplicum ===
This taxon has a double wall, resembling a pair of stacked cones; it may represent a taphomorph of C. vernicosum.

=== C. dumufuntum ===
This single cone has short conical spines, which occur on its basal region. This species is known from the mid-to-late Atdabanian siltstones of the Ouldburra formation of Australia.

=== C. spinuconum ===
This species again comprises a single cone; it has spines and processes along both margins.

== Differences from other taxa ==
Ceratophyton differs from the taxon Veryhachium in having a basal opening.
