= Cheleutochroa =

Cheleutochroa Temporal range: 463.8–445.6 Ma

Scientific classification
- (unranked): †Acritarcha
- Genus: †Cheleutochroa; Alfred R. Loeblich Jr and Helen Tappan, 1978

Species
- Cheleutochroa beechenbankensis Richards & Mullins, 2003; Cheleutochroa diaphorosa Turner, 1984; Cheleutochroa differta Uutela & Tynni, 1991; Cheleutochroa elegans Uutela & Tynni, 1991; Cheleutochroa gymnobrachiata Loeblich & Tappan, 1978; Cheleutochroa homoia Turner, 1984; Cheleutochroa meionia Turner, 1984; Cheleutochroa oculata Uutela & Tynni, 1991; Cheleutochroa ramosa Uutela & Tynni, 1991; Cheleutochroa rugosa Uutela & Tynni, 1991; Cheleutochroa tuberculosa Uutela & Tynni, 1991; Cheleutochroa venosa Uutela & Tynni, 1991; Cheleutochroa venosior Uutela & Tynni, 1991

Fossil genus of acritarchs

Cheleutochroa is an extinct genus of acritarchs from the Ordovician.

C. elegans was recovered from Rapla borehole in Estonia.
