= Calcitarch =

Calcitarchs Temporal range: Devonian–Pliocene

Scientific classification
- Kingdom: incertae sedis
- (unranked): †Calcitarcha; Versteegh et al., 2009

Genera
- See text.

Synonyms
- Bonetocardiellidae Masters & Scott, 1978; Calcisphaeridae Reitlinger, 1960 (in use in Foraminifera, alternative treatment); Calcisphaerulidae Bonet, 1956; Pithonellidae Keller, 1946 (in this treatment) (=Pithonellaceae); calcispheres (vernacular)

Group of calcareous microfossils

Calcitarchs, formal group name Calcitarcha, are hollow, essentially spherical, calcareous walled microfossils of unknown taxonomic affinity, ranging in size from around 60–500 microns, although some smaller forms are also known. The term was erected by G.J.M. Versteegh et al. in 2009 as a parallel to the organic walled microfossil group acritarchs which are similarly of unknown taxonomic affinity, and likewise most likely represent a collection of forms of variable origin united only by general morphological appearance plus the chemical composition of their walls. Most of the taxa included have also been referred to as calcispheres, however that term is more loosely defined and also contains some taxa that can be linked more definitively with "parent" taxonomic groups and have accordingly been moved elsewhere. Calcitarchs occur mainly in Palaeozoic and Mesozoic rocks, with a small number extending to the Cenozoic. As defined by Versteegh et al., the group includes the pithonellids (pithonelloids), which according to some workers are considered calcareous cysts of dinoflagellates, but which in Versteegh et al.'s opinion lack sufficient dinoflagellate-like characters to be definitively assigned there. Per the 2009 proposal of the group, and in parallel with the situation proposed for acritarchs, nomenclature for its members is governed by the botanical nomenclatural Code (ICNafp).

== Background ==
Rocks prepared for the study of calcareous-walled microfossils typically yield larger forms such as ostracods and foraminifera, and small forms (nannofossils) typically less than 30 microns in diameter (including isolated plates of coccolithophores, although the more rarely found intact cells can be up to 100 microns across). In between these size ranges, calcified spherical structures (presumed to represent fossil life forms) are sometimes also encountered, either as entire 3-D objects or in thin sections as prepared for microscopic study, which have historically been referred to as "calcispheres". Some of these have since been assigned to specific taxonomic groups such as dinoflagellates or charophytes, but a residue remains of uncertain taxonomic affinity. As with an equivalent collection of organic-walled, hollow forms that have been assigned the name "acritarchs" (Evitt, 1963), in 2009 G.J.M. Versteegh et al. proposed the formal group "calcitarchs" (Calcitarcha) to hold these calcareous-walled forms of no other known definite taxonomic affinity. As with the acritarchs, it is suggested that as future taxonomic associations become clarified (definitive), selected forms might be moved out of the Calcitarcha into wherever their more appropriate taxonomic location might be, leaving the group for forms that have no other definitive placement at the time in question.

== Etymology ==
The etymology of the name is given in Versteegh et al. as from Greek chalíki 'pebble' and arché 'origin'.

== Definition ==
Versteegh et al. provide the following diagnosis for the formal group Calcitarcha:

Diagnosis. Microfossils of unknown and probably varied biological affinities originally consisting of a central cavity enclosed by a wall of single or multiple layers and of calcium carbonate composition; symmetry, shape, structure, and ornamentation varied; central cavity closed or communicating with the exterior by varied means, for example: pores, a slit like or irregular rupture, a circular or angular opening (the pylome).
Remarks. The Calcitarcha, as defined here, are almost certainly a polyphyletic group of calcareous microfossils. Some may be calcareous cysts of dinoflagellates that lack the minimum of morphological features, which are required for a positive identification.

In erecting the group, Versteegh et al. recommended that, as with the acritarchs, calcitarch nomenclature be governed by the International Code of Botanical Nomenclature (currently the International Code of Nomenclature for algae, fungi, and plants or ICNafp).

== History of study ==
The first descriptions of organisms now assigned to the Calcitarcha were made by Kaufmann (in Heer, 1865), who described from thin sections the species Lagena ovalis, L. sphaerica plus the supposed new genus and species Oligostegina laevigata, all initially ascribed to Foraminifera. Subsequently Lorenz, 1902 created the genus Pithonella for Kaufmann's Lagena ovalis, with Pithonella ovalis as the type; L. sphaerica was also moved there later by Zügel, 1994. Over 80 species names are now known to have been erected in Pithonella, with about 20 currently accepted. Kaufmann's Oligostegina was to prove problematic; J.J. Galloway, in his 1933 "Manual of Foraminifera" synonymised it with Pithonella and then used Oligostegina as the senior name, leading to confusion in the subsequent literature, with limestones containing extensive Pithonella being sometimes still known as "Oligostegina limestones", however as subsequently noted by Colom, 1955, the two genera have nothing obvious in common, and in fact Colom proposes that the Kaufmann's (perfunctory) type illustration of Oligostegina is nothing more than a glancing section of a portion of a Globigerina (foraminifer).

Next, in another paper which has been the source of subsequent confusion, in 1880 W.C. Williamson described six small taxa from Wales plus a larger one from the United States under the new generic name Calcisphaera, although he did not indicate a type species. At least one of these, C. laevis, appears to be a calcisphere (calcitarch), the others are mostly miscellanea probably including radiolarians, while the larger, US form C. robusta appears to represent the gyrogonite (spore) of a fossil charophyte. Subsequently Miller, 1889, writing for a US audience, designated C. robusta as the type, which technically makes Calcisphaera a genus of fossil charophytes, although this has been disputed by e.g. Peck and Morales, 1966, who consider Miller's type species designation invalid and prefer to view C. laevis (as "first mentioned species") as the type, as previously indicated by H. Andrews, however Andrews himself cautioned against his statements being viewed as formal taxonomic designations (refer that work). For algal workers the situation seems to be presently resolved in favour of the C. robusta as type/charophyte designation (e.g. per AlgaeBase, 2026). Confusingly, the genus is also claimed by foraminiferal workers, for example Vachard (2016) treats Calcisphaera as the type genus of family "Calcisphaeridae Williamson, 1881 emend. Vachard and Téllez-Giron, 1986", and superfamily Calcisphaeroidea nov., which "could belong to Parathuramminida". As at 2026, the World Foraminifera Database recognises Calcisphaeridae as an accepted family within order Parathuramminida (Forminifera), however without Calcisphaera itself, a situation that is internally inconsistent. By contrast, Loeblich & Tappan, 1988 exclude Calcisphaera from Foraminifera, listing it as a calcisphere, while Mamet, 2006, accepts Calcisphaera as a valid calcisphere (=calcitarch) genus, stating (p. 332): "After a period of taxonomic instability, the genus is now stabilized and the type designation by Andrews (1955) [i.e., C. laevis] is now generally accepted."

Subsequently, genera presently considered calcitarchs have been described by Wetzel, 1933; Deflandre & Dangeard, 1938; Derville, 1950; Klumpp, 1953; Reitlinger, 1957; Stradner, 1961; Conil & Lys, 1964, 1968; plus others (see list below). Of particular note, Odin (2007 onwards) described a number of new genera of microproblematica that he called "gilanielles", believing them to represent most probably a new group of rhizopod protist (thus described in zoological nomenclature), but which have all been designated as Calcitarcha by Versteegh et al.

== Pithonella and allies: calcitarchs or dinoflagellates? ==
Whether or not Pithonella and allies (forms with "pithonelloid" wall structures) should be treated as calcitarchs or dinoflagellates is problematic. In DINOFLAJ3 (Williams et al., 2017), Pithonella is treated as a "provisional dinoflagellate" genus questionably assigned to the dinoflagellate family Peridiniaceae, subfamily Calciodinelloideae, (Note: Williams et al. list Thoracosphaera separately, in family Thoracosphaeraceae, order Thoracosphales, but do not place Pithonella there.) with the comment:

Keupp in Keupp and Mutterlose (1984) included in Pithonella forms of unknown affinity only; forms which are demonstrably dinoflagellates were included in Obliquipithonella and Orthopithonella. However, Willems (1995a, p.61) considered Pithonella to represent calcareous dinoflagellate cysts. Wendler et al. (2013, p.1098) considered that Pithonella has probable affiliation with dinoflagellates, although they confusingly listed the genus under both Calcitarcha (see Versteegh et al., 2009) and Division Dinoflagellata; for the present we provisionally retain it as a dinoflagellate.

while AlgaeBase (2026) (content also ported to WoRMS, the World Register of Marine Species) lists Pithonella in the dinoflagellate order Thoracosphaerales, family Thoracosphaeraceae, as does Nannotax 3 which uses the hierarchy "Dinophytes -> Thoracosphaeraceae -> Pithonellid -> Pithonella". However, Elbrächter et al., 2008, were careful to keep "Thoracosphaeraceae" and "calcareous microfossils exhibiting the pithonelloid cyst wall type" slightly separate (their list 2), stating "We include the taxonomic names assigned to the Pithonellaceae, but acknowledge the controversial discussion whether they were dinoflagellates, or not" (p. 1298). Versteegh et al. include the pithonelloid forms in Calcitarcha, stating: "Pithonelloids are conventionally regarded as calcareous dinoflagellate cysts and fit in the same size range, but their inclusion in the dinoflagellates is not strictly proven and therefore a matter of debate (Keupp and Kienel 1994 vs Streng et al. 2004).", and (since these authors are responsible for the formal definition of the group), that concept is followed here. Later work by Wendler et al. (2013) provides additional descriptive information for several Pithonella species and expanded on perceived homologies with dinoflagellates, but in summary could only note "The genus Pithonella represents calcareous cystforming microorganisms (this study) having probable affiliation with dinoflagellates." (p. 1098). Since "probable" is not definitive, it does appear best at this time to follow Versteegh et al.'s categorization as Calcitarcha, which explicitly states "Some may be calcareous cysts of dinoflagellates that lack the minimum of morphological features, which are required for a positive identification" (refer group diagnosis as reproduced above).

== Subgroups ==
Versteegh et al. distinguish two apparent subgroups within Calcitarcha (not including all calcitarch genera), namely "pithonelloid taxa" generally similar to Pithonella, and "gilianelloid taxa" which appear generally similar to Gilianella. The "gilianelloid" forms were previously given their own informal name "gilianelles" by Odin, 2007 before being incorporated into their treatment of the newly defined group Calcitarcha by Versteegh et al.

== Stratigraphic occurrence ==
From Table 1 in Versteegh et al., 2009 (modified version reproduced below) the earliest known calcitarch genera are Radiina, Radiosphaera and Sinothoracosphaera from the Devonian period and Pachysphaerina, Polyderma and Quasipolyderma from the Carboniferous, with the latest being Bachmayerella from the Miocene and Bolboforma which extends into the Pliocene. Many of the remainder, in particular those identified as the pithonelloid and gilianelloid subgroups, occur in rocks of the Cretaceous period.

== Calcitarch genera ==
There are around 53 accepted genera; the following list is from the Interim Register of Marine and Nonmarine Genera (IRMNG) as at May 2026, with the addition of Calcisphaera (presently treated as a charophyte in IRMNG). Information on stratigraphic range, also affiliation of selected taxa ([G] indicates gilianelloid forms, [P] indicates pithonelloid forms), is given from Versteegh et al., 2009 plus more recent sources as appropriate.

- Aquilegiella Odin, 2008 (Cretaceous) [G]
- Asterosphaerella Villain, 1975 (Cretaceous) (listed as a foraminifer in World Foraminifera database, June 2026)
- Aturella Odin, 2008 (Cretaceous) [G]
- Azymella Odin, 2008 (Cretaceous) [G]
- Bachmayerella Rögl & Franz, 1979 (Miocene)
- Barnesiella Trejo, 1983 (Cretaceous) - not Barnesiella Sakamoto, Lan & Benno, 2007, a bacterium
- Bolboforma Daniels & Spiegler, 1974 (Eocene–Pliocene)
- Bonetocardiella Dufour, 1968 (Cretaceous) [P] - includes Bonetiella Trejo, 1983
- Burocratus Trejo, 1983 (Cretaceous) [P]
- Caccabella Odin, 2008 (Cretaceous) [G]
- ? Calcisphaera Williamson, 1880 (Carboniferous). This genus may or may not be a calcitarch depending on which species is selected as the type - refer above discussion. If the type species designation C. robusta is treated as valid in Charophyta, other "calcitarch" Calcisphaera species (example: C. laevis) would require a new generic name. (The genus name Granulosphaera Derville, 1931 might be one contender if validly published, see e.g. Mamet, 2006, p. 330.)
- Chonesphaera Klumpp, 1953 (Eocene)
- Cimicellus Odin, 2008 (Cretaceous)
- Convictorella Odin, 2009 (Cretaceous)
- Coraliella Odin, 2008 (Cretaceous) [G]
- Corbella Odin, 2008 (Cretaceous) [G]
- Corniculum Odin, 2008 (Cretaceous) [G]
- Coronadinium Willems in Williams et al., 1998 (Cretaceous) [G] - includes Amphora Willems, 1994
- Favolithora Stradner, 1961
- Gildaella Trejo, 1983 (Jurassic)
- Gilianella Odin, 2007 (Cretaceous) [G]
- Globulella Odin, 2008 (Cretaceous)
- Lentodinella Kienel, 1994 (Cretaceous) [P]
- Lucernellus Odin, 2008 (Cretaceous)
- Navarrella Trejo, 1983 (Cretaceous) [P] - misspelled ("Navarella") in Versteegh et al.
- Nannoconoides Trejo, 1983 (Cretaceous)
- Numismella Odin, 2008 (Cretaceous) [G]
- Obbella Odin, 2008 (Cretaceous) [G]
- Orculiella Odin, 2008 (Cretaceous) [G]
- Pachysphaerina Conil & Lys, 1968 (Carboniferous) (originally Pachysphaera) (listed as a foraminifer in World Foraminifera database, June 2026)
- Palaeocancellus Derville, 1952 (Carboniferous) (originally Cancellus) (Note: name not in Versteegh et al., added from Mamet, 2006) (listed as a foraminifer in World Foraminifera database, June 2026)
- Pennigerella Odin, 2008 (Cretaceous) [G]
- Pilella Odin, 2008 (Cretaceous)
- Piperella Odin, 2008 (Cretaceous) - not Piperella Mayer, 1903 (Amphipoda) (zool.), a synonym of Caprellinoides, or Piperella (Presl ex Reichenbach) Spach, 1840 (Magnoliopsia) (bot.), a synonym of Micromeria
- Pithonella Lorenz, 1902 (Cretaceous) [P] - includes Andriella Bolli, 1974; Cadosinella Vogler, 1941; Calcisphaerula Bonet, 1956; Wallia H. Keupp, 1990
- Pleurozonaria Wetzel, 1933 (Cretaceous) [P]
- Pocillella Odin, 2008 (Cretaceous) [G]
- Polyderma Derville, 1950 (Carboniferous) (listed as a foraminifer in World Foraminifera database, June 2026)
- Praecalcisphaerula Trejo, 1983 (Cretaceous) [P]
- Pseudopithonella Trejo, 1983 (Cretaceous) - not Pseudopithonella Versteegh, 1993, a fossil dinoflagellate
- Quasipolyderma Conil & Lys, 1964 (Carboniferous) (listed as a foraminifer in World Foraminifera database, June 2026)
- Radiina Reitlinger, 1957 (Devonian)
- Radiosphaera Reitlinger, 1957 (Devonian) (listed as a foraminifer in World Foraminifera database, June 2026)
- Risserella Trejo, 1983 (Cretaceous) [P]
- Schizosphaerella Deflandre & Dangeard, 1938 (Jurassic) - includes Nannopatina Stradner, 1961
- Scutellella Odin, 2008 (Cretaceous) [G]
- Septiareata Kienel, 1994 (Cretaceous) [P]
- Sinothoracosphaera Hou, Tian, Chen, Xuan, Liu & Bo, 1991 (Devonian)
- Stomiosporella Trejo, 1983 (Cretaceous)
- Tercensella Odin, 2008 (Cretaceous) [G]
- Tetratropis Willems, 1990 (Cretaceous) [G]
- Tubellus Odin, 2009 (Cretaceous)- originally Tubella Odin, 2008, an invalid name (junior homonym)
- Vasculum Odin, 2008 (Cretaceous) - not Vasculum White, 1889, a fossil mollusc (zool.)
- Zugelia Özdikmen, 2009 (Cretaceous) [P] - originally Normandia Zügel, 1994, an invalid name (junior homonym)

The Carboniferous Mendipsia Conil & Longerstaey in Conil et al., 1980, treated as Calcitarcha in Versteegh et al., is instead treated as a foraminifer in family Tuberitinidae by Vachard, 2016.

The Devonian Moravosphaera Langer, 1997, treated as Calcitarcha in Versteegh et al., is treated as a fossil charophyte in Feist et al., 2018.

Septiareata Kienel, 1994 is treated as Calcitarcha in Verseegh, calcareous dinoflagellate (?) in Williams et al., 2017, but questionable per sources cited in Williams et al.

Bonetiella Trejo, 1983, listed as an accepted genus in Versteegh et al., is treated as a synonym of Bonetocardiella by Elbrächter et al., 2008.

Wallia H. Keupp, 1990, listed as an accepted genus in Versteegh et al., is treated as a synonym of Pithonella by Wendler et al., 2013.

== Alternative treatment ==
As at June 2026, the World Foraminifera Database recognises the family Calcisphaeridae Reitlinger, 1960 in superfamily Calcisphaeroidea Reitlinger, 1960 nom. transl. Vachard, 2016, with the following genera: Asterosphaera Reitlinger, 1957; Asterosphaerella Villain, 1975; Pachysphaerina Conil & Lys, 1968; Pachythurammina Vachard, 1977; Palaeocancellus Derville, 1952; Polyderma Derville, 1951; Quasipolyderma Conil & Lys, 1964; and Radiosphaera Reitlinger, 1957. Of these, Asterosphaerella, Pachysphaerina, Polyderma, Quasipolyderma and Radiosphaera are included in the list of calcitarch genera presented here, based on the papers of Versteegh et al. and others; the remainder have not been further investigated at this time. As noted above, Calcisphaera, which should be the type of this family, is not included, being listed elsewhere (within the World Register of Marine Species consortium of affiliated databases) as a charophyte.

== See also ==
- Acritarch
- Microfossil
