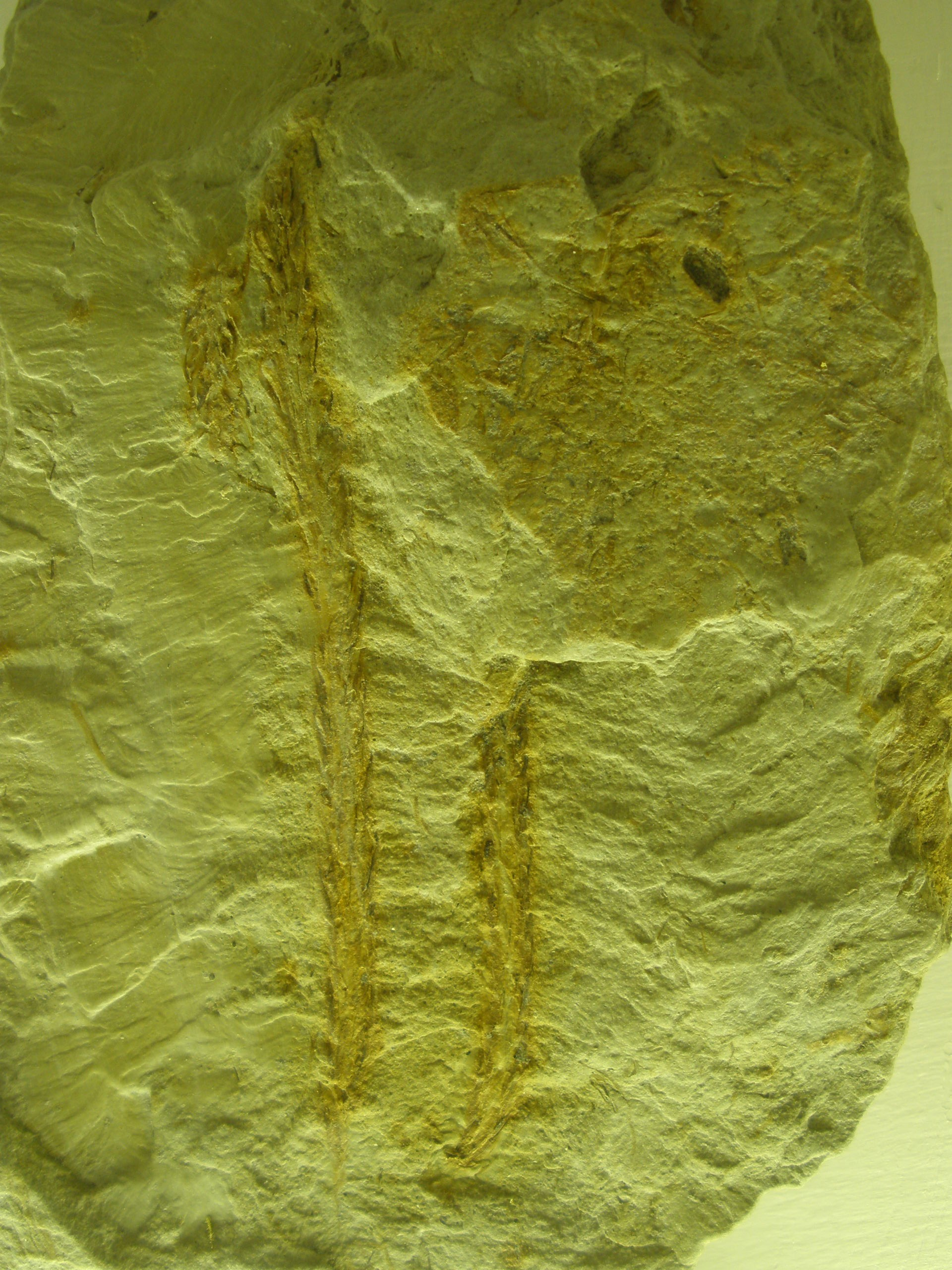
- Voltzia heterophylla

Scientific classification
- Kingdom: Plantae
- Clade: Tracheophytes
- Clade: Gymnospermae
- Division: Pinophyta
- Class: Pinopsida
- Order: †Voltziales; Andreanszky 1954

Families
- See text

= Voltziales =

Voltziales Temporal range: Late Carboniferous–Late Cretaceous

Extinct order of conifers

Voltziales is an extinct order of conifers. The group contains the ancestral lineages from which modern conifer groups emerged. Voltzialean conifers are divided into two informal groups, the primitive "walchian conifers" like Walchia, where the ovuliferous cone is composed of radial shoots and the more advanced "voltzian voltziales", also known as "transitional conifers" where the cone is composed of fertile scales with sessile seeds, like those of modern conifers. Walchian conifers generally grew as small trees. The earliest walchian conifers are known from the Middle Pennsylvanian (Moscovian). The youngest walchian conifers are known from the Late Permian. The earliest "voltzian voltziales" are known from the late Early Permian (Kungurian). Modern conifer lineages emerged from voltzialean ancestors from the Late Permian to Jurassic. Voltzialean conifers outside modern groups such as Krassilovia/Podozamites survived into the Cretaceous, before becoming extinct. The genus Voltzia was named in honour of the French geologist Philippe Louis Voltz.

== Taxonomy ==
- Utrechtiaceae
- Thucydiaceae
- Voltziaceae
- Emporiaceae
- Majonicaceae
- Ullmanniaceae
- Bartheliaceae
- Ferugliocladaceae
- Buriadiaceae
- Krassiloviaceae

== List of genera ==
- Voltzia
- Heidiphyllum
