= Rio Bonito Formation =

Geological formation in South America

- Stratigraphic range: Sakmarian-Artinskian
- Type: Geological formation
- Unit of: Guata Group, Paraná Basin
- Underlies: Irati Formation (Paraná Basin); Palermo Formation (Pelotas Basin)
- Overlies: Itararé Group (Paraná Basin); Pelotas Batholith & Dom Feliciano Belt (Pelotas Basin)

Lithology
- Primary: Sandstone

Location
- Coordinates: 25.3°S 50.5°W
- Approximate paleocoordinates: 45.7°S 29.4°W
- Region: São Paulo, Paraná, Santa Catarina, Rio Grande do Sul and Uruguay
- Country: Brazil; Uruguay
- Rio Bonito Formation (Brazil)

The Rio Bonito Formation is a geological formation of the Paraná and Pelotas Basins of Permian age. It is represented by a succession of cyclic sedimentary packages of sandstones, siltstones and shales which bear extensive deposits of coal that has been extracted since the 19th century. The Rio Bonito Formation was deposited in a coastal environment, formed by rivers, deltas, bays and estuaries with tidal plains, barrier islands and shallow marine platform, at a time when the Paraná Basin was a large gulf of the ancient supercontinent Gondwana. This gulf was open to the southwest, to the old ocean Panthalassa. The Rio Bonito Formation outcrops occur mainly in the eastern border of the Paraná Basin, in a narrow band in the states of São Paulo, Paraná, Santa Catarina, Rio Grande do Sul and Uruguay. The Rio Bonito Formation belongs to the second-order stratigraphic supersequence called Gondwana I.

== Glossopteris flora ==
The Glossopteris flora is characteristic of fossil sequences of the Gondwana supercontinent; it developed and became the dominant flora of the southern Permian to early Triassic, and became extinct at the end of that period. This flora is not only the main fossil content of the Rio Bonito Formation coals, the coal extracted as in Australia and South Africa's first work to record the occurrence of horizons megaflora associated with coal seams within a paleogeographic approach and palaeoclimatic in the Paraná Basin, was the study by White in 1908. This allowed a large correlation between Gondwana coal deposits in southern Brazil and those registered in South Africa, Australia, India and Antarctica, including showing that the latter has been in latitude near the south pole less than today, allowing the occurrence of an extensive flora.

=== Fossil content ===
Among others, the following fossil flora have been recovered from the formation:

- Araucarites
- Asterotheca
- Cordaites
- Coricladus
- Glossopteris
- Kawizophyllum
- Pecopteris
- Phyllotheca
- Samaropsis
- Sphenopteris
- Voltzia
